= 2000 Los Angeles Dodgers season =

2000 Los Angeles Dodgers
- League: National League
- Division: West
- Ballpark: Dodger Stadium
- City: Los Angeles
- Record: 86–76 (.531)
- Divisional place: 2nd
- Owners: Fox Entertainment Group
- President: Bob Graziano
- General managers: Kevin Malone
- Managers: Davey Johnson
- Television: Fox Sports Net West 2 KTLA (5)
- Radio: XTRA Sports 1150; Vin Scully, Ross Porter, Rick Monday; KWKW; Jaime Jarrín, Pepe Yñiguez

The 2000 Los Angeles Dodgers season was the 111th for the franchise in Major League Baseball, and their 43rd season in Los Angeles, California. In 2000, the team set a club record for home runs with 211, led by Gary Sheffield, who tied Duke Snider's single-season club mark with 43. Eric Karros became the L.A. Dodger all-time leader with his 229th home run and Dave Hansen set a Major League record with seven pinch-hit home runs. Kevin Brown led the league in E.R.A. with 2.58 and rookie pitcher Matt Herges started the season 8–0, the first pitcher since Fernando Valenzuela to open the season with eight straight victories. The Dodgers won 86 games, but failed to make the postseason, finishing second in the National League West. Manager Davey Johnson was fired after the season and replaced with bench coach Jim Tracy.

== Offseason ==
- November 8, 1999: Acquired Shawn Green and Jorge Nunez from the Toronto Blue Jays for Raúl Mondesí and Pedro Borbón, Jr.
- December 12, 1999: Acquired Terry Adams, Chad Ricketts and Brian Stephenson from the Chicago Cubs for Ismael Valdez and Eric Young.
- March 15, 2000: Craig Counsell was released by the Los Angeles Dodgers.
- April 1, 2000: Acquired Kenny Lutz from the Cincinnati Reds for Juan Castro.

== Regular season ==
=== Season standings ===
NL West
Team	W	L	Pct.	GB	Home	Road
San Francisco Giants	97	65	.599	—	55‍–‍26	42‍–‍39
Los Angeles Dodgers	86	76	.531	11	44‍–‍37	42‍–‍39
Arizona Diamondbacks	85	77	.525	12	47‍–‍34	38‍–‍43
Colorado Rockies	82	80	.506	15	48‍–‍33	34‍–‍47
San Diego Padres	76	86	.469	21	41‍–‍40	35‍–‍46

=== Record vs. opponents ===
2000 National League record Source: NL Standings Head-to-Head
Team	AZ	ATL	CHC	CIN	COL	FLA	HOU	LAD	MIL	MON	NYM	PHI	PIT	SD	SF	STL	AL
Arizona	—	3–6	5–4	2–5	7–6	4–5	6–1	7–6	4–5	4–5	2–7	8–1	7–2	9–4	6–7	5–4	6–9
Atlanta	6–3	—	4–5	2–5	5–4	6–6	5–4	7–2	6–3	6–7	7–6	8–5	5–2	8–1	6–3	3–4	11–7
Chicago	4–5	5–4	—	4–8	4–5	1–6	5–7	3–6	6–7	4–5	2–5	6–3	3–9	3–5	4–5	3–10	8–7
Cincinnati	5–2	5–2	8–4	—	6–3	3–6	7–5	4–5	5–8–1	6–3	5–4	3–4	7–6	4–5	3–6	7–6	7–8
Colorado	6–7	4–5	5–4	3–6	—	4–5	5–4	4–9	4–5	7–2	3–6	6–3	7–2	7–6	6–7	5–3	6–6
Florida	5–4	6–6	6–1	6–3	5–4	—	3–5	2–7	3–4	7–6	6–6	9–4	5–4	2–7	3–6	3–6	8–9
Houston	1–6	4–5	7–5	5–7	4–5	5–3	—	3–6	7–6	4–5	2–5	5–4	10–3	2–7	1–8	6–6	6–9
Los Angeles	6–7	2–7	6–3	5–4	9–4	7–2	6–3	—	3–4	5–3	4–5	5–4	4–5	8–5	7–5	3–6	6–9
Milwaukee	5–4	3–6	7–6	8–5–1	5–4	4–3	6–7	4–3	—	4–5	2–7	2–5	7–5	2–7	3–6	5–7	6–9
Montreal	5–4	7–6	5–4	3–6	2–7	6–7	5–4	3–5	5–4	—	3–9	5–7	3–4	3–6	3–6	2–5	7–11
New York	7–2	6–7	5–2	4–5	6–3	6–6	5–2	5–4	7–2	9–3	—	6–7	7–2	3–6	3–5	6–3	9–9
Philadelphia	1–8	5–8	3–6	4–3	3–6	4–9	4–5	4–5	5–2	7–5	7–6	—	3–6	2–5	2–7	2–7	9–9
Pittsburgh	2–7	2–5	9–3	6–7	2–7	4–5	3–10	5–4	5–7	4–3	2–7	6–3	—	7–2	2–6	4–8	6–9
San Diego	4–9	1–8	5–3	5–4	6–7	7–2	7–2	5–8	7–2	6–3	6–3	5–2	2–7	—	5–7	0–9	5–10
San Francisco	7–6	3–6	5–4	6–3	7–6	6–3	8–1	5–7	6–3	6–3	5–3	7–2	6–2	7–5	—	5–4	8–7
St. Louis	4–5	4–3	10–3	6–7	3–5	6–3	6–6	6–3	7–5	5–2	3–6	7–2	8–4	9–0	4–5	—	7–8

=== Opening Day lineup ===
Opening Day starters
Name	Position
Devon White	Center fielder
Mark Grudzielanek	Second baseman
Gary Sheffield	Left fielder
Shawn Green	Right fielder
Eric Karros	First baseman
Todd Hundley	Catcher
Adrián Beltré	Third baseman
Kevin Elster	Shortstop
Kevin Brown	Starting pitcher

== Notable transactions ==
- June 13, 2000: Acquired Al Reyes from the Baltimore Orioles for Alan Mills.
- June 20, 2000: Acquired Jim Leyritz from the New York Yankees for José Vizcaíno.
- July 26, 2000: Acquired Ismael Valdez from the Chicago Cubs for Jamie Arnold and Jorge Piedra.
- July 31, 2000: Acquired Tom Goodwin from the Colorado Rockies for Todd Hollandsworth, Randey Dorame and Kevin Gibbs.
- August 6, 2000: Acquired Bruce Aven from the Pittsburgh Pirates for cash.

=== Roster ===
2000 Los Angeles Dodgers
Roster
Pitchers: 51 Terry Adams; 52 Jamie Arnold; 27 Kevin Brown; 37 Darren Dreifort; 56 Mike Fetters; 48 Éric Gagné; 49 Matt Herges; 55 Orel Hershiser; 60 Mike Judd; 50 Onan Masaoka; 46 Trever Miller; 75 Alan Mills; 40 Gregg Olson; 13 Antonio Osuna; 61 Chan Ho Park; 33 Carlos Pérez; 57 Luke Prokopec; 52,59 Al Reyes; 41 Jeff Shaw; 59 Ismael Valdes; 54 Jeff Williams	Catchers: 9 Todd Hundley; 21 Chad Kreuter; 16 Paul Lo Duca; Infielders: 29 Adrián Beltré; 66 Hiram Bocachica; 45 Jeff Branson; 3 Alex Cora; 50 Chris Donnels; 43 Kevin Elster; 8 Mark Grudzielanek; 25 Dave Hansen; 23 Eric Karros; 18 Jim Leyritz; 7 José Vizcaíno	Outfielders: 47 Bruce Aven; 17 Gerónimo Berroa; 47 Shawn Gilbert; 28 Tom Goodwin; 15 Shawn Green; 28 Todd Hollandsworth; 45 Mike Metcalfe; 14 F. P. Santangelo; 10 Gary Sheffield; 22 Devon White; Other batters: 45 Adam Melhuse	Manager: 5 Davey Johnson; Coaches: 26 Rick Dempsey (bullpen); 44 Rick Down (hitting); 35 Glenn Hoffman (third base); 11 Manny Mota; 38 Claude Osteen (pitching); 31 John Shelby (1st base); 12 Jim Tracy (bench); 17 Dave Wallace (pitching)

== Game log ==
=== Regular season ===
Legend
	Dodgers win
	Dodgers loss
	Postponement
	Eliminated from playoff race
**Bold**	Dodgers team member

2000 regular season game log: 86–76 (Home: 44–37; Away: 42–39)
April: 14–10 (Home: 5–3; Away: 9–7)

#	Date	Time (PT)	Opponent	Score	Win	Loss	Save	Time of Game	Attendance	Record	Box/ Streak

May: 14–12 (Home: 7–8; Away: 7–4)

#	Date	Time (PT)	Opponent	Score	Win	Loss	Save	Time of Game	Attendance	Record	Box/ Streak

June: 13–15 (Home: 7–8; Away: 6–7)

#	Date	Time (PT)	Opponent	Score	Win	Loss	Save	Time of Game	Attendance	Record	Box/ Streak
51	June 2		@ Angels	L 5–12						28–23	L1
52	June 3		@ Angels	**W** 8–3						29–23	W1
53	June 4		@ Angels	L 7–8						29–24	L1
54	June 5		@ Rangers	L 0–2						29–25	L2
55	June 6		@ Rangers	**W** 7–1						30–25	W1
56	June 7		@ Rangers	**W** 11–6						31–25	W2
58	June 9		Athletics	L 1–3						32–26	L1
59	June 10		Athletics	**W** 7–2						33–26	W1
60	June 11		Athletics	L 0–6						33–27	L1

July: 14–12 (Home: 7–4; Away: 7–8)

#	Date	Time (PT)	Opponent	Score	Win	Loss	Save	Time of Game	Attendance	Record	Box/ Streak
84	July 7		@ Mariners	**W** 3–2 (11)						44–40	W3
85	July 8		@ Mariners	L 0–11						44–41	L1
86	July 9		@ Mariners	L 0–2						44–42	L2
87	July 13		Angels	**W** 4–3 (10)						45–42	W1
88	July 14		Angels	L 3–5						45–43	L1
89	July 15		Angels	L 2–6						45–44	L2

August: 15–15 (Home: 6–7; Away: 9–8)

#	Date	Time (PT)	Opponent	Score	Win	Loss	Save	Time of Game	Attendance	Record	Box/ Streak

September: 16–11 (Home: 12–7; Away: 4–4)

#	Date	Time (PT)	Opponent	Score	Win	Loss	Save	Time of Game	Attendance	Record	Box/ Streak

October: 0–1 (Home: 0–0; Away: 0–1)

#	Date	Time (PT)	Opponent	Score	Win	Loss	Save	Time of Game	Attendance	Record	Box/ Streak

== Starting Pitchers stats ==
Note: G = Games pitched; GS = Games started; IP = Innings pitched; W/L = Wins/Losses; ERA = Earned run average; BB = Walks allowed; SO = Strikeouts; CG = Complete games

Name	G	GS	IP	W/L	ERA	BB	SO	CG
Kevin Brown	33	33	230.0	13-6	2.58	47	216	5
Chan Ho Park	34	34	226.0	18-10	3.27	124	217	3
Darren Dreifort	32	32	197.2	12-9	4.16	87	164	1
Carlos Perez	30	22	144.0	5-8	5.56	33	64	0
Éric Gagné	20	19	101.1	4-6	5.15	60	79	0
Ismael Valdez	9	8	40.0	0-3	6.08	13	29	0
Orel Hershiser	10	6	24.2	1-5	13.14	14	13	0
Luke Prokopec	5	3	21.0	1-1	3.00	9	12	0
Mike Judd	1	1	4.0	0-1	15.75	3	5	0

== Relief Pitchers stats ==
Note: G = Games pitched; GS = Games started; IP = Innings pitched; W/L = Wins/Losses; ERA = Earned run average; BB = Walks allowed; SO = Strikeouts; SV = Saves

Name	G	GS	IP	W/L	ERA	BB	SO	SV
Jeff Shaw	60	0	57.1	3-4	4.24	16	39	27
Terry Adams	66	0	84.1	6-9	3.52	39	56	2
Matt Herges	59	4	110.2	11-3	3.17	40	75	1
Mike Fetters	51	0	50.0	6-2	3.24	25	40	5
Antonio Osuna	46	0	67.1	3-6	3.74	35	70	0
Onan Masaoka	29	0	27.0	1-1	4.00	15	27	0
Alan Mills	18	0	25.2	2-1	4.21	16	18	1
Gregg Olson	13	0	17.2	0-1	5.09	7	15	0
Jamie Arnold	2	0	6.2	0-0	4.05	5	3	0
Al Reyes	6	0	6.2	0-0	0.00	1	8	0
Jeff Williams	7	0	5.2	0-0	15.88	8	3	0
Trever Miller	2	0	2.1	0-0	23.14	3	1	0

== Batting Stats ==
Note: Pos = Position; G = Games played; AB = At bats; Avg. = Batting average; R = Runs scored; H = Hits; HR = Home runs; RBI = Runs batted in; SB = Stolen bases

Name	Pos	G	AB	Avg.	R	H	HR	RBI	SB
Todd Hundley	C	90	299	.284	49	85	24	70	0
Chad Kreuter	C	80	212	.264	32	56	6	28	1
Paul Lo Duca	C/LF/RF/3B	34	65	.246	6	16	2	8	0
Adam Melhuse	C	1	1	.000	0	0	0	0	0
Eric Karros	1B	155	584	.250	84	146	31	106	4
Mark Grudzielanek	2B/SS	148	617	.279	101	172	7	49	12
Alex Cora	SS/2B	109	353	.238	39	84	4	32	4
Adrián Beltré	3B/SS	138	510	.290	71	148	20	85	12
Kevin Elster	SS/3B/1B	80	220	.227	29	50	14	32	0
Dave Hansen	1B/3B/LF	102	121	.289	18	35	8	26	0
José Vizcaíno	SS/3B/2B/1B	40	93	.204	9	19	0	4	1
Jim Leyritz	1B/C/LF/RF	41	60	.200	3	12	1	8	0
Chris Donnels	3B/LF	27	34	.294	8	10	4	9	0
Jeff Branson	2B/3B/SS	18	17	.235	3	4	0	0	0
Hiram Bocachica	2B	8	10	.300	2	3	0	0	0
Shawn Green	RF/CF	162	610	.269	98	164	24	99	24
Todd Hollandsworth	CF/LF/RF	81	261	.234	42	61	8	24	11
Gary Sheffield	LF	141	501	.325	105	163	43	109	4
Tom Goodwin	CF/LF	56	211	.251	29	53	1	11	16
Devon White	CF	47	158	.266	26	42	4	10	3
F.P. Santangelo	CF/LF/RF/2B	81	142	.197	19	28	1	9	3
Gerónimo Berroa	LF/RF/1B	24	31	.258	2	8	0	5	0
Bruce Aven	LF	9	20	.250	2	5	2	4	0
Shawn Gilbert	LF/CF	15	20	.150	5	3	1	3	0
Mike Metcalfe	CF/LF/2B	4	12	.083	0	1	0	0	0

== 2000 Awards ==
- 2000 Major League Baseball All-Star Game
  - Kevin Brown reserve
  - Gary Sheffield reserve
- NL Player of the Week
  - Gary Sheffield (June 12–18)
  - Gary Sheffield (July 9–16)
  - Chan Ho Park (Sep. 18–24)

== Farm system ==
Level	Team	League	Manager
AAA	Albuquerque Dukes	Pacific Coast League	Tom Gamboa
AA	San Antonio Missions	Texas League	Rick Burleson
High A	San Bernardino Stampede	California League	Dino Ebel
High A	Vero Beach Dodgers	Florida State League	John Shoemaker
A-Short Season	Yakima Bears	Northwest League	Butch Hughes
Rookie	Great Falls Dodgers	Pioneer League	Juan Bustabad
Rookie	DSL Dodgers; DSL Dodgers 2	Dominican Summer League	

== Major League Baseball draft ==
The Dodgers selected 50 players in this draft. Of those, eight of them would eventually play Major League baseball.

The first round pick was right-handed pitcher Ben Diggins from the University of Arizona. He was traded to the Milwaukee Brewers in 2002 and appeared in five games with them as a starting pitcher that season with an 0–4 record and an 8.63 ERA. Those would be the only Major League games he would appear in as he was out of baseball after a few more years in the minors.

The second round pick, pitcher Joel Hanrahan from Norwalk High School would be the only moderately successful player in this draft class. He became a two-time All-Star as a relief pitcher with the Pittsburgh Pirates. Catcher Koyie Hill (round 4) would catch on as a backup catcher for several teams, most notably the Chicago Cubs.

2000 draft picks

Round	Name	Position	School	Signed	Career span	Highest level
1	Ben Diggins	RHP	University of Arizona	Yes	2001–2006	MLB
2	Joel Hanrahan	RHP	Norwalk High School	Yes	2000–2013	MLB
3	Jeff Tibbs	RHP	Davis High School	Yes	2000–2002	Rookie
4	Koyie Hill	C	Wichita State University	Yes	2000–2014	MLB
5	Heath Totten	RHP	Lamar University	Yes	2000–2008	AAA
6	Greg Withelder	LHP	Wilmington College	Yes	2000–2003	A+
7	Jared Price	C	Minico High School	Yes	2000–2011	AAA
8	Jason Hickman	LHP	Ball State University	Yes	2000–2002	Rookie
9	Humberto Sánchez	RHP	South Bronx High School	No; Tigers-2002	2002–2012	MLB
10	Drew Toussaint	C	Centennial High School	No; Angels-2004	2004–2008	AA
11	Shane Nance	LHP	University of Houston	Yes	2000–2005	MLB
12	Travis Ezi	OF	Southwestern High School	Yes	2001–2009	AA
13	Ronte Langs	OF	Oklahoma State University	Yes	2000–2004	A+
14	Jonathan Lorenzen	RHP	Katella High School	Yes	2000–2001	Rookie
15	Derek Michaelis	1B	Rice University	Yes	2000–2005	AAA
16	Adrian Mendoza	1B	California State University, Northridge	Yes	2000–2002	Rookie
17	Jason Olson	RHP	Armstrong Atlantic State University	Yes	2000–2009	AAA
18	Casey Kennedy	RHP	University of Central Florida	Yes	2000–2003	A+
19	Kevin Poenitzsch	RHP	Galveston College	No		
20	Aaron Rice	C	A. B. Miller High School	No		
21	Steve Langone	RHP	Boston College	Yes	2000–2006	AAA
22	Greg Bauer	RHP	Wichita State University	Yes	2000–2005	AA
23	Victor Martinez	3B	Ranum High School	No		
24	Zach Lekse	SS	University of Oklahoma	No		
25	Nathan Lipowicz	OF	University of Central Missouri	Yes	2000–2001	AAA
26	Nick Alvarez	OF	St. Thomas University	Yes	2000–2006	AAA
27	Brian Steffek	RHP	Houston Baptist University	Yes	2000–2005	AA
28	Aron Andrews	RHP	Auburn University	Yes	2000–2002	A+
29	Ryan Sadowski	RHP	Western High School	No; Giants-2003	2003–2012	MLB
30	Clifton Glidewell	LHP	New Mexico State University	Yes	2000	A-
31	Frank Esposito	LHP	Sierra College	No		
32	Ryan Johansen	RHP	University of South Florida	Yes	2001–2002	A+
33	Brad Jalbert	OF	St. Joseph's High School	No		
34	Patrick Hicklen	RHP	Oakland High School	No; Royals-2004	2004–2006	AA
35	Erik Lohse	RHP	Sacramento City College	No; Twins-2001	2001–2005	AA
36	Dustin Schroer	OF	Johnston Heights High School	No		
37	Víctor Díaz	2B	Clemente High School	Yes	2001–2015	MLB
38	Brian Barton	OF	Westchester High School	No; Indians -2005	2005–2014	MLB
39	Demetrick Drumming	2B	Spartanburg Methodist College	No	2003	Ind
40	Kyle Bateman	RHP	Central Arizona College	No		
41	Mike Lynch	C	Oak Forest High School	No; Dodgers-2001	2002–2006	Rookie
42	Timi Moni-Erigbali	OF	Columbus High School	No; Phillies-2002	2002–2005	A+
43	Daniel Desclouds	RHP	Sir Robert Borden High School	No		
44	Josh Mayo	SS	Sacramento City College	No		
45	Justin Glenn	OF	Cowley County Community College	No		
46	Marcus Davila	RHP	Key West High School	No; Pirates-2002	2002–2005	A+
47	Jason Blejwas	RHP	Vernon College	No		
48	Jayson Berrios	RHP	Academia Discipulos de Cristo	No		
49	Shaun Kott	RHP	LP Miller Comprehensive	No		
50	Brooks Bollinger	3B	University of Wisconsin at Madison	No		
