= Ricky Stone =

American baseball player (born 1975)

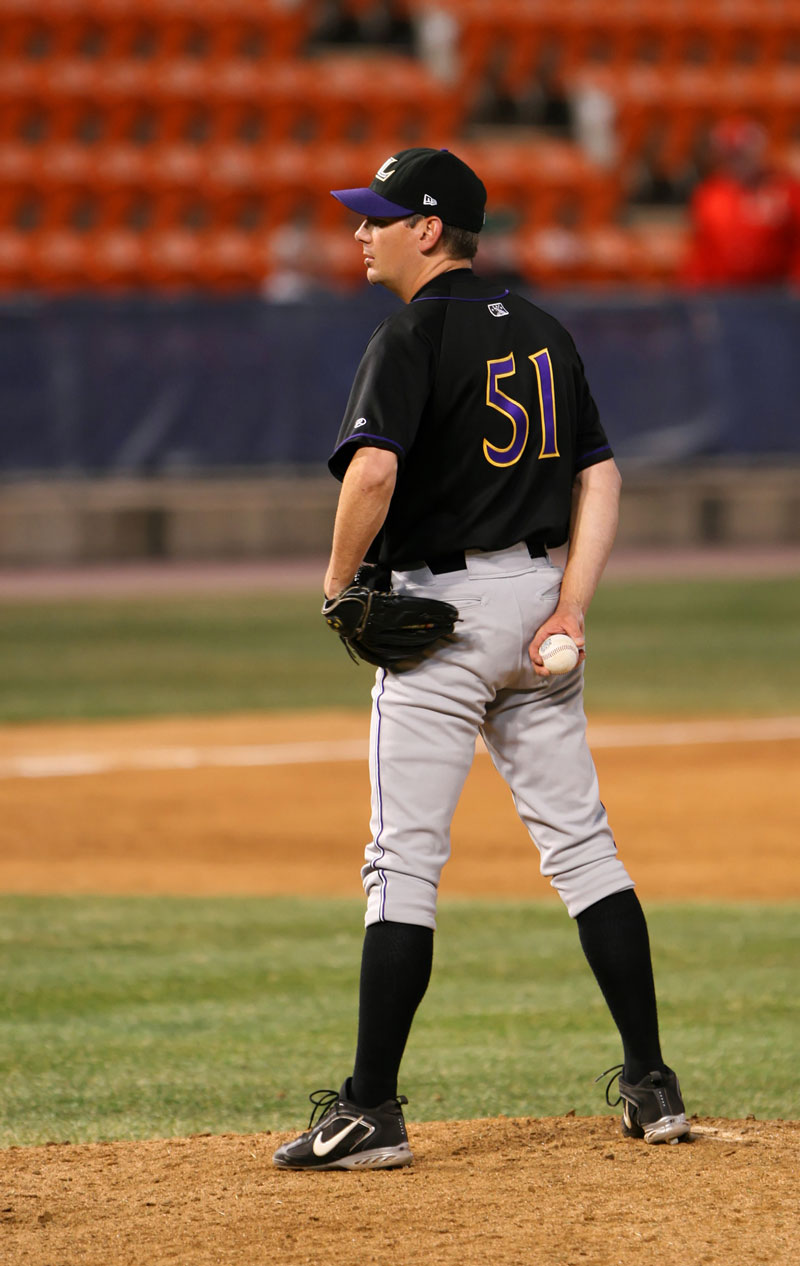
- Pitcher
- Born: February 28, 1975 (age 51); Hamilton, Ohio, U.S.
- Batted: Right Threw: Right

MLB debut
- September 21, 2001, for the Houston Astros

Last MLB appearance
- July 21, 2007, for the Cincinnati Reds

MLB statistics
- Win–loss record: 11–9
- Earned run average: 4.68
- Strikeouts: 170

CPBL statistics
- Win–loss record: 1–1
- Earned run average: 3.00
- Strikeouts: 14
- Stats at Baseball Reference

Teams
- Houston Astros (2001–2004); San Diego Padres (2004); Cincinnati Reds (2005, 2007); Uni-President 7-Eleven Lions (2008)

Ricky L. Stone (born February 28, 1975) is an American former Major League Baseball pitcher.

== Career ==
He attended Hamilton High School and was drafted by the Los Angeles Dodgers in the 4th round of the 1994 amateur draft.

According to then-Albuquerque Dukes strength and conditioning coach Todd Seyler, in July 1999, he, Stone, Matt Herges, Paul Lo Duca, Mike Judd and Jeff Williams met at Stone's apartment to inject themselves with steroids. He claimed he observed Stone inject himself in the thigh with Deca-Durabolin. Seyler believed they continued to use steroids in their training. Stone declined to talk to Mitchell Report investigators about the allegations.

In 2008, Stone pitched for the Uni-President Lions of the Chinese Professional Baseball League.

Stone was at a Reds-Astros game in August 2008 and later suffered a grand mal seizure at his home. His wife's CPR may have saved his life. On August 8, 2008, Stone was diagnosed with a brain tumor. He had surgery to remove the tumor and to perform a biopsy on the mass. It was confirmed that the tumor was indeed malignant.

== See also ==
- List of Major League Baseball players named in the Mitchell Report
