= Tim Laker =

American baseball player and coach (born 1969)

Los Angeles Angels – No. 83
- Catcher / Coach
- Born: November 27, 1969 (age 56); Encino, California, U.S.
- Batted: Right Threw: Right

MLB debut
- August 18, 1992, for the Montreal Expos

Last MLB appearance
- June 18, 2006, for the Cleveland Indians

MLB statistics
- Batting average: .226
- Home runs: 11
- Runs batted in: 79
- Stats at Baseball Reference

Teams
- Montreal Expos (1992–1993, 1995); Baltimore Orioles (1997); Tampa Bay Devil Rays (1998); Pittsburgh Pirates (1998–1999); Cleveland Indians (2001, 2003–2004); Tampa Bay Devil Rays (2005); Cleveland Indians (2006); As coach: Arizona Diamondbacks (2017–2018); Seattle Mariners (2019–2021); Los Angeles Angels (2024-present)

Timothy John Laker (born November 27, 1969) is an American professional baseball catcher and coach. He is the offensive coordinator for the Los Angeles Angels of Major League Baseball (MLB). He was previously the hitting coach for the Seattle Mariners. He played in MLB for the Montreal Expos, Baltimore Orioles, Tampa Bay Devil Rays, Pittsburgh Pirates, and Cleveland Indians from 1992 to 2006.

== Early life ==
Laker was born in Encino, California and graduated from Simi Valley High School in Simi Valley, California. He played college baseball at Oxnard Community College in Oxnard, California.

== Career ==
The Montreal Expos selected Laker in the sixth round of the 1988 Major League Baseball draft. During his professional baseball career, Laker played for the Baltimore Orioles, Cleveland Indians, Montreal Expos, Pittsburgh Pirates, and Tampa Bay Devil Rays. He last played professional baseball with the Triple-A Buffalo Bisons in 2006.

=== Mitchell Report ===
Laker was named in the Mitchell Report, which detailed anabolic steroid use in MLB, on December 13, 2007. As a current ball club employee, Laker was required to consent to an interview, in which he admitted to purchasing Deca-Durabolin and testosterone from Kirk Radomski from 1995 to 1999. Laker claimed he was introduced to Radomski by teammate David Segui. In March 2008, Laker admitted regretting his decision to take performance-enhancing drugs, stating:

"I made a poor decision, a mistake, and all I can do is ask for forgiveness and move on."

=== Coaching and Managing ===
Laker first managed the Mahoning Valley Scrappers, then the Cleveland Indians' Short-Season A affiliate, in 2007. He led the New York–Penn League side to a 37-37 record. However, after just one season, he was moved to the position of "Roving Catching Instructor" within the Indians organization and replaced by Travis Fryman. Laker cited health concerns related to colitis, as the reason for the change.

In December 2009, Laker was named the Manager of the Double-A West Tenn Diamond Jaxx of the Southern League, an affiliate of the Seattle Mariners.

Laker became Hitting Coach for the Chicago White Sox triple-A affiliate, the Charlotte Knights for the 2011 season. In 2016, he was the Hitting Coach for the Akron Rubber Ducks in the Cleveland Indians minor league system.

In December 2016, Laker was named Assistant Hitting Coach of the Arizona Diamondbacks for the 2017 season.

The Seattle Mariners announced their hiring of Laker as their Hitting Coach for the 2019 season.

On November 15, 2021, the Mariners announced that Laker declined the club's offer to return as its Hitting Coach.

On November 21, 2023, Laker joined the Los Angeles Angels coaching staff as their offensive coordinator.

== See also ==
- List of Major League Baseball players named in the Mitchell Report
