= Josías Manzanillo =

Dominican baseball player (born 1967)

- Pitcher
- Born: October 16, 1967 (age 59); San Pedro de Macoris, Dominican Republic
- Batted: Right Threw: Right

MLB debut
- October 5, 1991, for the Boston Red Sox

Last MLB appearance
- September 22, 2004, for the Florida Marlins

MLB statistics
- Win–loss record: 13–15
- Earned run average: 4.71
- Strikeouts: 300
- Stats at Baseball Reference

Teams
- Boston Red Sox (1991); Milwaukee Brewers (1993); New York Mets (1993–1995); New York Yankees (1995); Seattle Mariners (1997); New York Mets (1999); Pittsburgh Pirates (2000–2002); Cincinnati Reds (2003); Florida Marlins (2004)

Josías Manzanillo Adams (born October 16, 1967) is a Dominican former professional baseball pitcher who played in Major League Baseball (MLB) between 1991 and 2004 for eight different teams.

== Career ==
In 1997, Manzanillo suffered a grisly injury while pitching for the Seattle Mariners. Not wearing a protective cup, he was struck in the groin by a line drive off the bat of Manny Ramírez which ruptured his testicles. Manzanillo managed to recover the baseball, throw out Jim Thome at home plate and sprint off the field under his own power before undergoing emergency reconstructive surgery.

On December 13, 2007, Manzanillo was one of many athletes mentioned in the detailed Mitchell Report by former Senator George Mitchell. In the report, former New York Mets clubhouse attendant Kirk Radomski claimed that in 1994 Manzanillo asked Radomski to inject him with the steroid Deca-Durabolin, which Radomski did. Radomski stated that he remembered the event clearly because it was the only time he ever injected a player with steroids, and indeed the only time he actually saw a player use steroids. Manzanillo denied ever having used performance-enhancing drugs, saying that he once paid Radomski $200–$250 for one cycle of steroids but then "chickened out or thought better of it" and never took possession of the drugs.

== Personal life ==
Manzanillo's brother, Ravelo Manzanillo, played three seasons for two teams, as well as 18 seasons for various Minor League and international teams. On June 30, 1994, they became the first pair of brothers to both earn an MLB save on the same day.

== See also ==
- List of Major League Baseball players named in the Mitchell Report
