= Jack Cust =

American baseball player (born 1979)

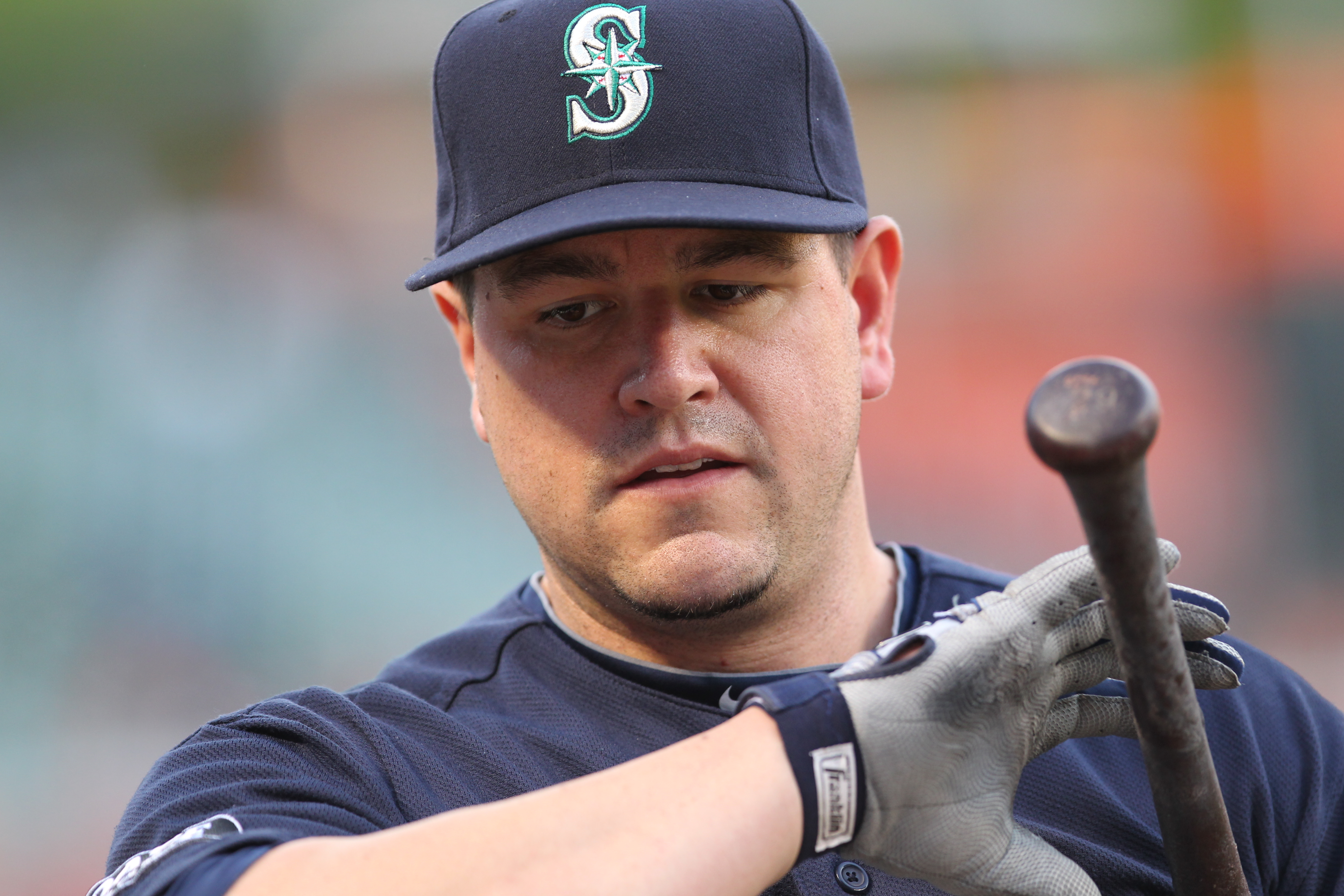
- Cust with the Seattle Mariners
- Designated hitter / Outfielder
- Born: January 7, 1979 (age 47); Flemington, New Jersey, U.S.
- Batted: Left Threw: Right

MLB debut
- September 26, 2001, for the Arizona Diamondbacks

Last MLB appearance
- July 27, 2011, for the Seattle Mariners

MLB statistics
- Batting average: .242
- Home runs: 105
- Runs batted in: 323
- Stats at Baseball Reference

Teams
- Arizona Diamondbacks (2001); Colorado Rockies (2002); Baltimore Orioles (2003–2004); San Diego Padres (2006); Oakland Athletics (2007–2010); Seattle Mariners (2011)

John Joseph Cust III (born January 7, 1979) is an American former professional baseball designated hitter and outfielder. He played in Major League Baseball (MLB) for the Arizona Diamondbacks, Colorado Rockies, Baltimore Orioles, San Diego Padres, Oakland Athletics, and Seattle Mariners.

== Early life ==
Cust was born to Jack Sr. and Faith Cust. His father had played for the Seton Hall Pirates baseball team which went to the 1974 College World Series and his brothers, Kevin and Mike, both played minor league baseball. Cust attended Immaculata High School in Somerville, New Jersey. In 1997, he was first-team High School All-American at first base. Cust initially committed to play college baseball for the Alabama Crimson Tide.

== Professional career ==
=== Arizona Diamondbacks ===
In 1997, Cust, out of high school, was the first round draft pick (30th overall) of the Arizona Diamondbacks, and had a .447 on-base percentage in 35 games in the Rookie League. Cust was a Pioneer League All-Star in 1998, where he led the league in walks (86), on-base percentage (.530), and runs scored (75). In 1999, he led the California League in homers (32), on-base percentage (.450), and slugging percentage (.651), and was Baseball America's 1st team Minor League All-Star DH, California League All-Star, and the Arizona Diamondbacks Minor League Player of the Year. In 2000, he had a .440 on-base percentage at El Paso in the Texas League while leading the league in walks (117) and strikeouts (150).

In 2001, he was a Pacific Coast League All-Star while leading the league with 102 walks, and in 2002 he was the Triple-A All-Star Game MVP. In 2006, he led the PCL with 143 walks (also leading the minor leagues), walking 24.5% of the time, while sporting a .467 on-base percentage with 30 home runs. In 11 minor league seasons with five different organizations, he hit exactly 200 home runs, had a .286 batting average, and a .429 on-base percentage. Statistically, he hit a home run once every 19 at-bats, struck out once every 3 at-bats, and earned 1 walk per game.

Cust made his Major League debut with the Diamondbacks on September 26, 2001. In 3 games for Arizona, he went 1-for-2 (.500) with a walk.

=== Colorado Rockies ===
On January 7, 2002, his 23rd birthday, Cust was traded alongside JD Closser to the Colorado Rockies in exchange for pitcher Mike Myers. Cust spent the majority of the 2002 season with the Rockies' Triple-A affiliate, the Colorado Springs Sky Sox. He played in 35 games with the big league club, going 11–65 (.169 batting average) with one home run.

=== Baltimore Orioles ===
The Rockies traded Cust to the Baltimore Orioles in exchange for Chris Richard and cash on March 11, 2003. Cust appeared in 28 games (27 in 2003, 1 in 2004) during his two seasons with the ballclub, spending most of the time with the Ottawa Lynx. He was most noted as an Oriole for an infamous baserunning gaffe that resulted in his making the final out in a 12-inning 5–4 loss to the New York Yankees at Camden Yards on August 16, 2003. Representing the potential tying run at first base after a two-out pinch-hit walk, he attempted to score on a double to right field by Larry Bigbie, but was caught in a rundown after tumbling to the grass a few steps beyond third base. Even though he outmaneuvered catcher Jorge Posada and third baseman Aaron Boone and was headed towards an undefended home plate, Cust fell to the grass again and was tagged out from behind by Boone.

Cust was granted free agency following the 2004 season.

=== Oakland Athletics ===
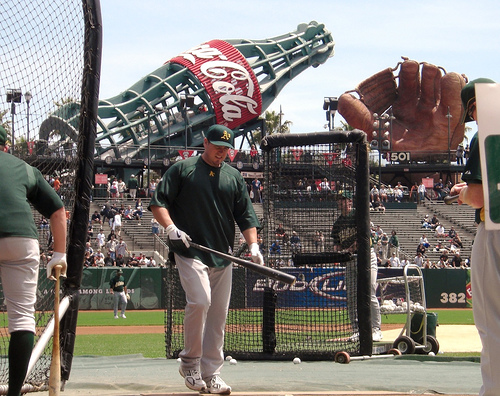
Cust taking batting practice before a game against the San Francisco Giants in 2007.

On November 15, 2004, he was signed by the Oakland Athletics. He spent the whole season in Triple-A Sacramento, and was granted free agency after the season. On December 6, 2005, he signed a minor league contract with the San Diego Padres. He just had 3 at-bats in the 2006 season. He began the 2007 with the San Diego Padres' Triple-A Portland Beavers. On May 3, 2007, the Padres traded him to the Oakland Athletics, although he was rumored to be joining Japan's Chiba Lotte Marines. The Athletics needed another designated hitter due to an injury to veteran Mike Piazza. Cust quickly endeared himself to A's fans by hitting 6 home runs in his first 7 games. Cust would hit .346 with 14 RBI during that seven-game stretch. On May 13, 2007, with two outs and an 0–2 count in the bottom of the ninth, the A's rallied to score 5 runs to beat Joe Borowski and the Cleveland Indians 10–7, ending with Cust hitting a walk-off 3-run home run.

After hitting .348 with 1 double and 5 home runs along with 13 RBI, Cust shared Co-American League Player of the Week honors along with teammate Dan Johnson for the week ending May 13, 2007. On August 10, Cust hit his first major league grand slam off relief pitcher Macay McBride of the Detroit Tigers after hitting a 3-run double earlier in the game to give him a career-high 7 RBI. He finished the 2007 season leading the Athletics in home runs with 26, walking 21.0% of the time (tops in the major leagues) but striking out 41.5% of the time (also tops in the majors).

For the week ending May 4th, 2008, Cust was once again the American League Player of the Week, going 10 for 20 with three home runs over the week. On September 19, he broke the AL record for most strikeouts in one season with 187. For the season he struck out 41.0% of the time, the highest percentage in major league baseball, once every 2.4 at-bats. He also walked 18.8% of the time, the second highest rate in the majors, and led the American League with 111 walks.

On December 12, 2009, Cust was non-tendered by the Athletics making him a free agent. On January 7, 2010, Cust re-signed with the Oakland Athletics on a 1-year $2.5 million contract. However, he was designated for assignment on April 3, at the end of Spring training. On April 7, Cust cleared waivers and was outrighted to Triple-A. During his 33 minor league game tenure, he hit .273 with 4 home runs and 19 RBIs, and matched his 33 Ks w/ 33 walks. On May 15, he was added to the 40-man roster and recalled. In the first game he appeared in, he made a comedic error in left field. He appeared mostly in the outfield until Eric Chavez ended up on the DL, then assumed the primary DH spot. On September 13, Cust hit his 100th career home run in a 3–1 Athletics victory over the Kansas City Royals at Kauffman Stadium.

Following the 2010 season, Cust was non-tendered for the second year in a row, and became a free agent.

=== Seattle Mariners ===
On December 8, 2010, Cust signed a one-year contract with the Seattle Mariners. On July 29, 2011, the Mariners released Cust after he batted .213/.344/.329 with three home runs and 23 RBI over 67 appearances.

=== Return to the minors ===
Cust signed a minor league contract with the Philadelphia Phillies on August 12, 2011. In 6 games for the Triple-A Lehigh Valley IronPigs, he went 5-for-20 (.250) with 1 home run and 2 RBI. Cust was released a week later on August 20.

On January 18, 2012, Cust signed a one-year, $600,000 contract with the Houston Astros that included an option for the 2013 season. However, Cust was released by the Astros organization on March 27, before the end of spring training.

On March 28, Cust signed a minor league contract with the New York Yankees and was assigned to their Triple-A affiliate, the Scranton/Wilkes-Barre Yankees. In 98 games for Scranton, he batted .249/.400/.475 with 20 home runs and 66 RBI. Cust was released by the Yankees organization on August 1.

On August 4, Cust signed a minor league contract with the Toronto Blue Jays and was assigned to their Triple-A affiliate, the Las Vegas 51s. In 16 games for Las Vegas, he batted .200 with no home runs and 6 RBI. On November 3, Cust became a minor league free agent.

On February 17, 2013, the Tampa Bay Rays announced that Cust would be attending major league spring training on a minor league contract. On March 23, the Rays released Cust.

After spending the rest of 2013 out of professional baseball, Cust resurfaced with the Baltimore Orioles after signing a minor league contract with the team on February 5, 2014. His comeback attempt lasted 44 days; he was released prior to the start of the season on March 21.

=== Mitchell Report ===
On December 13, 2007, Cust was named in the Mitchell Report as a user of performance-enhancing drugs, although there was never any evidence outside of a conversation he once supposedly had with former teammate Larry Bigbie. Cust denied any wrongdoing or use of performance-enhancing drugs and said there were inaccuracies in his citation in the report.

== See also ==
- List of Major League Baseball players named in the Mitchell Report
