= Chris Donnels =

American baseball player (born 1966)

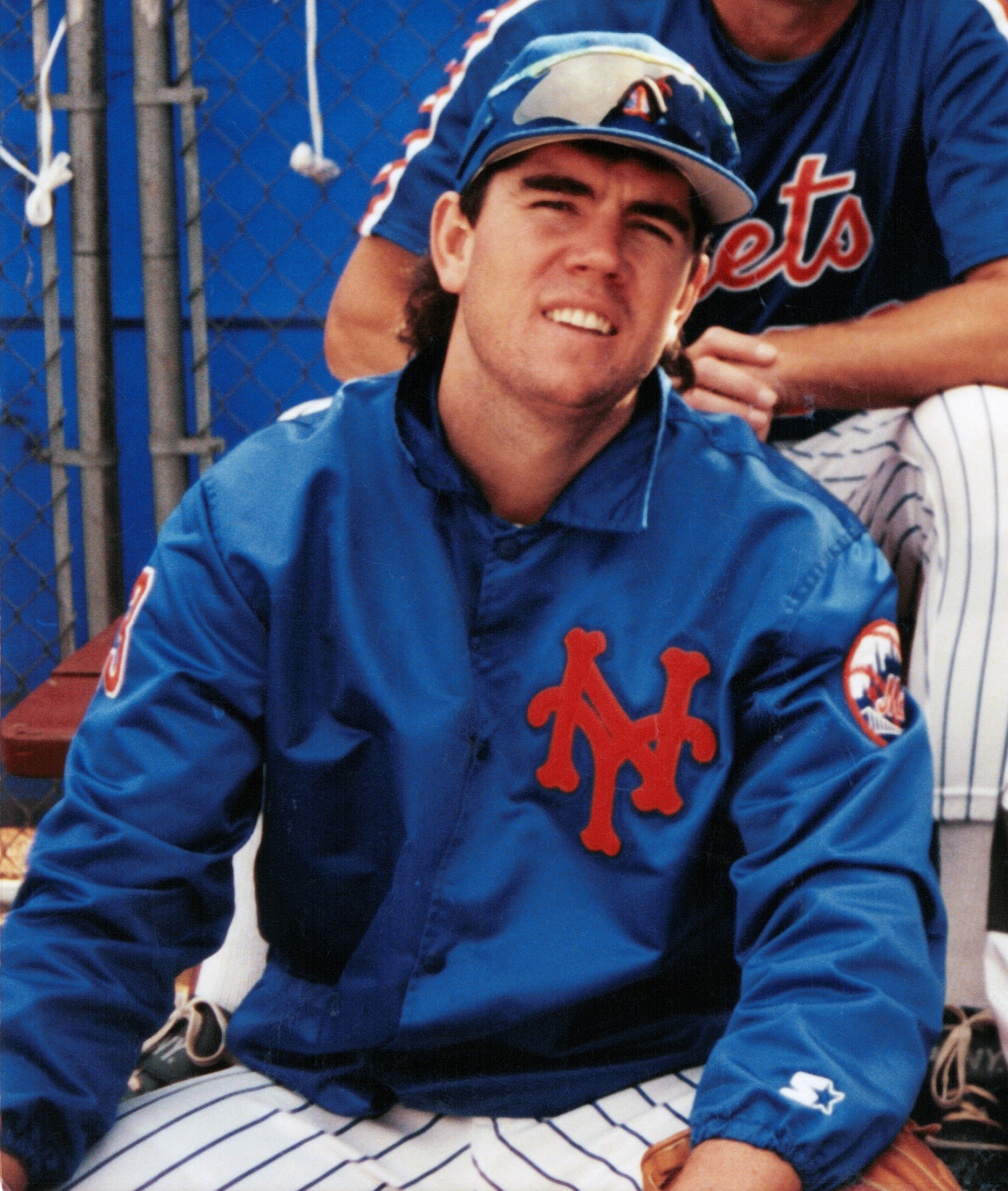
- Donnels with the New York Mets in 1992
- Third baseman
- Born: April 21, 1966 (age 60); Los Angeles, California, U.S.
- Batted: Left Threw: Right

MLB debut
- May 7, 1991, for the New York Mets

Last MLB appearance
- September 29, 2002, for the Arizona Diamondbacks

MLB statistics
- Batting average: .233
- Home runs: 17
- Runs batted in: 86

NPB statistics
- Batting average: .288
- Home runs: 42
- Runs batted in: 142
- Stats at Baseball Reference

Teams
- New York Mets (1991–1992); Houston Astros (1993–1995); Boston Red Sox (1995); Kintetsu Buffaloes (1996); Orix BlueWave (1997–1998); Los Angeles Dodgers (2000–2001); Arizona Diamondbacks (2002)

Christopher Barton Donnels (born April 21, 1966) is an American former Major League Baseball third baseman. He is an alumnus of Loyola Marymount University where he was a standout for the Lions' baseball team. He register's name in Japan called "C.D" in 1996 and 1998 season.

== New York Mets ==
Donnels was drafted out of college in the first round (24th overall pick) of the 1987 Major League Baseball draft. He spent the next few years ascending through the Mets minor league affiliates. On May 7, 1991, Donnels made his Major League Baseball debut for the Mets, recording an RBI of Tim Belcher in his debut. Over the course of his rookie year, he played in 37 games, compiling a .225 batting average.

Donnels spent only limited time with the Mets in the 1992 season. He appeared in 45 games, but struggled considerably, putting together a .174 batting average. At the conclusion of the 1992 season, the Mets failed to protect Donnels, and he was chosen by the Florida Marlins as the 67th pick of the 1992 expansion draft. Only a month later, the Marlins placed Donnels on waivers.

== Houston Astros ==
Almost immediately after being placed on waivers by Florida, Donnels was signed to a contract by the Houston Astros. It was with the Astros in the 1993 season that Donnels appeared in the most games of any season throughout his career. He appeared in 88 games, playing the primary backup to third baseman Ken Caminiti. Donnels pieced together a .257 batting average and hit the first two home runs of his major league career.

He continued this role for the 1994 season. In 1995, after appearing in 19 games with Houston, the Astros sent Donnels to the Boston Red Sox as part of a conditional deal. Astros rookie Phil Nevin made the team, thus making Donnels expendable.

== Japan ==
Although Donnels finished the 1995 season with the Red Sox, appearing in 40 more games, his career collapsed after the season. He was released at the season's end, and failed to draw interest from another major league club. Donnels was signed by the Kintetsu Buffaloes for the 1996 season with register name "C.D". He then played three seasons for the Orix BlueWave from 1997-1999.

== Los Angeles Dodgers ==
On February 8, 2000, days before spring training for the 2000 season began, Donnels was invited to attend the spring camp for the Los Angeles Dodgers. Considering he had not seen major league action in four years, Donnels had an outstanding spring, and surprised many by not being cut like many veterans in his position are every year. Although he saw limited action in 2000, only appearing in 27 games, Donnels compiled a respectable .294 batting average with four home runs.

The 2001 season saw Donnels appear in 66 games for the Dodgers, continuing as one of the primary pinch hitters off the bench. He became a free agent at the end of the season.

== End of career ==
When Donnels' contract with the Dodgers expired at the end of the 2001 season, the Arizona Diamondbacks offered Donnels a contract and more money. He went on to play the 2002 season with Arizona, hitting .238 with 3 home runs in 74 games. He was traded to the Chicago Cubs at the beginning of the 2003 season, but did not see any playing time. Five weeks later, the Florida Marlins purchased Donnels' contract from the Cubs. Donnels remained in the Marlins minor league system until the end of the season when he was released. On March 8, 2004, Donnels signed a free agent contract with the Colorado Rockies. Nearing forty years of age, Donnels played out the season for the Rockies Triple-A affiliate, the Colorado Springs Sky Sox, then retired.

He played in his last official major league game on September 29, 2002.

== Mitchell Report ==
On December 13, 2007, he was named in the Mitchell Report to the Commissioner of Baseball of an Independent Investigation Into the Illegal Use of Steroids and Other Performance Enhancing Substances by Players in Major League Baseball. According to the report, Donnels purchased both human growth hormone and anabolic steroids from Kirk Radomski between 2000 and 2004.

== See also ==
- List of Major League Baseball players named in the Mitchell Report
