= Chad Allen =

Chad Allen may refer to:

- Chad Allen (actor) (born 1974), American actor known for his role on Dr. Quinn: Medicine Woman
- Chad Allen (baseball) (born 1975), baseball outfielder formerly with the Minnesota Twins
- Chad Allen (curler) (born c. 1974), Canadian curler

== See also ==
- Chad Allan (Allan Kowbel, 1943–2023), Canadian guitarist, singer and television host
