= Adam Piatt =

American baseball player (born 1976)

- Outfielder
- Born: February 8, 1976 (age 50); Chicago, Illinois, U.S.
- Batted: Right Threw: Right

MLB debut
- April 24, 2000, for the Oakland Athletics

Last MLB appearance
- September 23, 2003, for the Tampa Bay Devil Rays

MLB statistics
- Batting average: .248
- Home runs: 16
- Runs batted in: 65
- Stats at Baseball Reference

Teams
- Oakland Athletics (2000–2003); Tampa Bay Devil Rays (2003)
Medals
Men's baseball
Representing United States
World Junior Baseball Championship
Silver medal – second place	1994 Brandon	Team

Adam David Piatt (born February 8, 1976) is an American former professional baseball outfielder who played for the Oakland Athletics and Tampa Bay Devil Rays of Major League Baseball (MLB) from 2000 to 2003.

== Career ==
Piatt played baseball at Bishop Verot High School, followed by a successful college career at Mississippi State University (MSU), helping lead the Bulldogs to multiple NCAA Tournament appearances. Piatt led the MSU team in 1996 with a .370 batting average. Piatt played mostly at third base for MSU and was named to the second team All-Southeastern Conference unit in 1997, when the Bulldogs reached the College World Series. He chose to leave school early after that, and signed a professional contract. Piatt finished his education at MSU, earning Cum Laude honors from MSU's Business School.

Piatt's best year was 1999 when he won the triple crown and minor league player of the year award at third base. He became an outfielder because of the A's present third baseman, Eric Chavez, and that was the only opening on the A's. He hit .299 in 60 games in 2000 with 5 home runs and 5 triples. In 2001, he got viral meningitis, but survived. He was designated for assignment by the A's in August 2003 and was claimed off waivers by Tampa Bay. In 2004, he went to Cleveland, but retired before the season.

Piatt was once featured in a commercial for K-Swiss shoes.

In the Mitchell Report, Piatt admitted to having used steroids. Piatt said that former A's teammate F. P. Santangelo had told him about a man who could give Piatt human growth hormone (HGH). Piatt (who was trying to come back from viral meningitis) received HGH and testosterone from Kirk Radomski and used them in the 2002–2003 off-season. After using them, he said he "did not love the game when he used them" and that he had learned a life lesson. Piatt told all of this to Mitchell during their meeting. Former Senator George Mitchell commended Piatt for his honesty, and for being one of the few players to come forward to discuss the league's performance-enhancing drug use.

Piatt now lives in Cape Coral, Florida.

== See also ==
- List of Major League Baseball players named in the Mitchell Report
