= F. P. Santangelo =

American baseball player and broadcaster (born 1966)

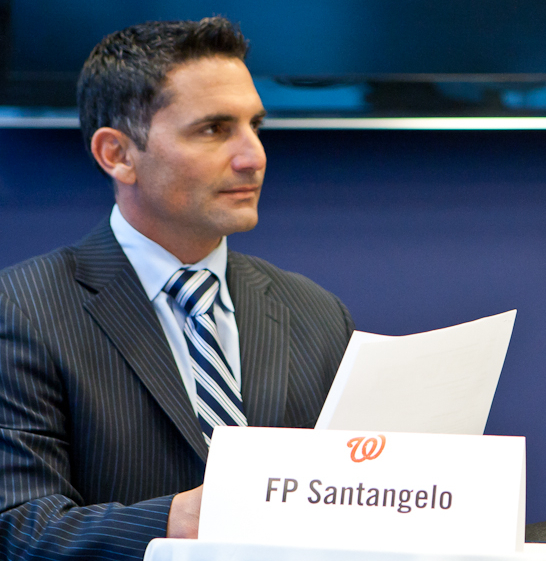
- Santangelo in 2011
- Outfielder
- Born: October 24, 1966 (age 59); Livonia, Michigan, U.S.
- Batted: Switch Threw: Right

MLB debut
- August 2, 1995, for the Montreal Expos

Last MLB appearance
- October 7, 2001, for the Oakland Athletics

MLB statistics
- Batting average: .245
- Home runs: 21
- Runs batted in: 162
- Stats at Baseball Reference

Teams
- Montreal Expos (1995–1998); San Francisco Giants (1999); Los Angeles Dodgers (2000); Oakland Athletics (2001)

Frank-Paul Santangelo (born October 24, 1966) is an American former professional baseball player. He played Major League Baseball from 1995 to 2001 for the Montreal Expos, San Francisco Giants, Los Angeles Dodgers, and Oakland Athletics. He also served as a broadcaster for the Washington Nationals and now with the San Francisco Giants.

== Early life ==
A native of El Dorado Hills, California, Santangelo attended Oak Ridge High School, Sacramento City College, and the University of Miami. In 1988, he played collegiate summer baseball with the Brewster Whitecaps of the Cape Cod Baseball League.

== Career ==
Santangelo was drafted in the 20th round of the 1989 Major League Baseball draft by the Montreal Expos organization and rose through the minor leagues, reaching the AAA with the Indianapolis Indians in 1992. He joined the AAA Ottawa Lynx the following year when the Expos changed AAA affiliation, and wound up playing three seasons for Ottawa before making his major league debut in August 1995. Santangelo became the first player in Ottawa Lynx history to have his number, 24, retired. He holds the club record with 86 runs scored in the 1993 season.

Santangelo made his Major League debut on August 2, 1995, as the starting left fielder against the Florida Marlins. He grounded out to third base in his first at-bat but tripled to right field off of Chris Hammond in the fifth inning for his first major-league hit. He was 2-for-3 with a run batted in (RBI) in his debut. He hit his first home run on August 24 off Sergio Valdez of the San Francisco Giants.

Santangelo finished fourth in the National League in Rookie of the Year voting in 1996. He played six different positions while posting a .277 average with seven home runs and 56 RBI. He was hit by 11 pitches, starting a four-year streak of being in the top 10 in the National League in that category. In four seasons with Montreal, he hit .251 with 17 homers and 119 RBI in 439 games.

He signed as a free agent with the San Francisco Giants on December 23, 1998, and played in 113 games for them during the 1999 season, hitting .260. He also stole 12 bases that season, the highest total of his career. He then signed with the Los Angeles Dodgers on January 11, 2000, and hit .197 for them in 81 games. In his tenure with the Dodgers, Santangelo primarily was used as a backup to Gary Sheffield, Tom Goodwin and Todd Hollandsworth. The Dodgers released him on March 29, 2001, and he signed with the Oakland Athletics the next week, on April 5, 2001.

With the Athletics, he was in 32 games in 2001 and hit only .197, while also playing 71 games for AAA Sacramento River Cats. He also played in his first and only post-season series in 2001, appearing in two games for the Athletics in the 2001 American League Division Series.

In 2002, he played in 44 games for the River Cats, hitting .174, and also played in seven games for the Columbus Clippers in the New York Yankees farm system, where he had one hit in 15 at-bats.

In his MLB career, Santangelo played in a total of 665 games with 415 hits, 21 home runs, and 162 RBIs. His career batting average was .245.

During his career, left field and center field were Santangelo's most frequent positions, though he also played at least one game each at second base, third base, shortstop, right field, and designated hitter. Santangelo, a switch hitter, hit home runs from both sides of the plate in the same game on June 7, 1997, against the Chicago Cubs.

== Mitchell Report ==
Following the release of the Mitchell Report in which he was named by Kirk Radomski as having used Deca-Durabolin, HGH, and testosterone, Santangelo confirmed he used HGH on two occasions in 1997 and 2000 to rehab from a quadriceps and knee injury but denied the other allegations, including telling teammate Adam Piatt that Radomski "will get you what you need."

== Broadcasting career ==
Santangelo co-hosted a sports radio talk show called "The Rise Guys" on KHTK-1140 AM in Sacramento from 2006 to 2008. On November 21, 2008, he was fired immediately after concluding his show for the day. KHTK gave low ratings and cost-cutting as the explanation. He said he felt "stabbed in the back" by the station.

On March 1, 2010, Santangelo became the host of San Francisco's KNBR-680 AM SportsPhone680 in the 7–10 pm time slot. He also worked as a reporter and fill-in game announcer for Giants broadcasts on CSN Bay Area and the Giants Radio Network. During his tenure with 680 AM, Santangelo made his point known that he preferred to see players hit home runs as opposed to players who used "small-ball" strategy, while also stating "steroid-induced home runs are way more entertaining than strategic runs."

On January 6, 2011, Santangelo was named the color analyst for the Washington Nationals' telecasts on the Mid-Atlantic Sports Network (MASN), returning to the organization with which he spent over half his playing career (the Montreal Expos relocated to Washington, D.C., in 2005). He was paired with play-by-play announcer Bob Carpenter. After Santangelo's first season as a broadcaster with the Nationals, The Washington Post sports columnist Tracee Hamilton noted that the Carpenter-Santangelo team improved over 2011, and The Washington Post sports blogger Dan Steinberg wrote about Santangelo's performance and how he sought to be educational, not outrageous, in the broadcast booth.

Santangelo's signature line as an announcer is a reverse play off the superstition of never speaking about a no-hitter when it is in progress. Whenever the first Nationals hit of the game occurs, Santangelo says flatly "There goes the no-hitter." Santangelo has explained that he says it as a tribute to his former manager Felipe Alou, who as manager of the Expos always said it when the Expos got their first hit in game. He was able to use the line in every game he called with the team, with the closest he came to not be able to say it was when Michael Wacha was an out away in September 2013 before Ryan Zimmerman broke up the bid with an infield single. When Michael Lorenzen pitched a no-hitter against the Nationals in August 2023, after Santangelo was no longer a color analyst for the team, Santangelo reacted to it on Twitter by referencing the phrase as a hashtag. Santangelo does not use the line when the opposing team gets its first hit, but on September 28, 2014, moments after Jordan Zimmermann pitched the first no-hitter in Washington Nationals history, Santangelo announced, "And there is the no-hitter!". He made the same remark after Max Scherzer's no-hitters on June 20 and October 3, 2015.

Santangelo returned to San Francisco in 2022, where he hosted the pregame show for the San Francisco Giants on KNBR, as well as the station's late-night call-in show KNBR Tonight. In 2023, Santangelo teamed up with Joe Ritzo to fill in for Jon Miller and Dave Flemming on KNBR for Giants broadcasts. On Nov. 29, 2023, he was one of several hosts fired in a station shakeup. Santangelo said KNBR Tonight was canceled due to budget cuts, and would be replaced with syndicated programming.

=== Misconduct allegation ===
Santangelo was absent from the MASN broadcasts of three Nationals games between April 30 and May 2, 2021, returned for the broadcasts of May 4 and 5. He then was absent from a YouTube broadcast of the game of May 6, despite the Nationals having aired promotional spots on MASN for his scheduled appearance as a color commentator during the YouTube broadcast, and did not return for MASN broadcasts on or after May 7.

Santangelo's abrupt disappearance from the broadcast team went unexplained until May 8, when The Athletic reported that Santangelo's absence was the result of a woman's allegation of sexual misconduct by Santangelo via an anonymous Instagram post. The same day, a Nationals spokeswoman informed the press that the Nationals had revoked their approval of Santangelo as a member of the Nationals broadcasting team and requested that MASN remove Santangelo from Nationals broadcasts, which had resulted in his absence from April 30 to May 2. The Nationals spokeswoman explained that a MASN investigation had cleared Santangelo, allowing him to return for the broadcasts of May 4 and 5, but after additional allegations of misconduct surfaced online, the Nationals had again asked for his removal, resulting in his absence and indefinite suspension after May 5. MASN referred the matter to Major League Baseball's Department of Investigations for assistance in the investigation.

In a statement on May 8, Santangelo denied the allegations, and a MASN spokesman expressed surprise at the Nationals' willingness to air the accusations publicly before MLB could complete an investigation. Santangelo returned to Nationals broadcasts on July 16, 2021, and that day MASN explained through a spokesman that "The Commissioner's Office and MASN have reviewed the anonymous claim made against F. P. Santangelo. MLB and MASN have found no evidence that Mr. Santangelo violated the terms of his contractor agreement, [or] league, or network regulations, nor is there more evidence currently available to us to collect. Accordingly, Mr. Santangelo's credentials have been restored and he resumed performing his duties tonight." A Nationals spokeswoman told the press, "We were informed that MLB and MASN had completed a review of Mr. Santangelo, and that MASN would be returning him to his broadcast duties today."

On November 3, 2021, Santangelo announced that he would not return to Nationals broadcasts for the 2022 season.

== Personal life ==
Santangelo has married twice; his second marriage was to Playboy Playmate Michelle McLaughlin. He previously lived in Alexandria, Virginia while broadcasting for the Nationals, but now lives in San Francisco.

Santangelo's first marriage produced two children, who as of March 2018 attended college in California.

== See also ==
- List of Major League Baseball players named in the Mitchell Report
