= Chad Allen (baseball) =

American baseball player (born 1975)

- Left fielder
- Born: February 6, 1975 (age 51); Dallas, Texas, U.S.
- Batted: Right Threw: Right

Professional debut
- MLB: April 6, 1999, for the Minnesota Twins
- NPB: March 24, 2007, for the Orix Buffaloes

Last appearance
- MLB: June 2, 2005, for the Texas Rangers
- NPB: September 27, 2007, for the Orix Buffaloes

MLB statistics
- Batting average: .269
- Home runs: 14
- Runs batted in: 84

NPB statistics
- Batting average: .286
- Home runs: 4
- Runs batted in: 34
- Stats at Baseball Reference

Teams
- Minnesota Twins (1999–2001); Cleveland Indians (2002); Florida Marlins (2003); Texas Rangers (2004–2005); Orix Buffaloes (2007)
Medals
Men's baseball
Representing United States
Olympic Games
| Bronze medal – third place | 1996 Atlanta | Team |

John Chad Allen (born February 6, 1975) is an American former professional baseball left fielder. He played in Major League Baseball (MLB) for the Minnesota Twins, Cleveland Indians, Florida Marlins and Texas Rangers.

== Career ==
Born in Dallas, Texas, his father was Jackie Allen, a cornerback in the National Football League. He attended Duncanville High School and played college baseball for Texas A&M University from 1994 to 1996. He was drafted by the Minnesota Twins in the fourth round of the 1996 Major League Baseball draft. Allen also served as a member of the United States national baseball team in the 1996 Summer Olympics.

After seven games in 1996, Allen began his first full professional season with the Fort Myers Miracle, where he had a .305 batting average over 105 games. He was then promoted to the New Britain Rock Cats, where he spent the rest of 1997 and the entire 1998 season. In 1998, he had a .262 batting average, 82 runs batted in (RBI), and 21 stolen bases. After spring training, he made the opening day roster for the 1999 Minnesota Twins season, and spent the year as the team's starting left fielder. In 137 games, Allen had a .277 batting average, 10 home runs, and 14 stolen bases. He spent most of 2000 with the Salt Lake Buzz, and played 15 games in the majors. After 57 games with the Twins in 2001, he tore his ACL in August which ended his season; the Twins released him during the offseason.

For the rest of his career, Allen remained mostly in the minor leagues. In 2002, he played five games for the Cleveland Indians. In 2003, he played 12 games for the Florida Marlins, and he played a combined 41 games over two seasons for the Texas Rangers; his last major league game was June 2, 2005. At the start of the 2006 season, the Kansas City Royals assigned him to the Omaha Royals of the Pacific Coast League (PCL), where he had a .314 batting average in 105 games.

In 2007, Allen played for the Orix Buffaloes of Nippon Professional Baseball. On December 13, 2007, he was named in the Mitchell Report, naming players who had used steroids. His playing career ended after that. From 2013-2014, Allen served as the hitting coach for the New Britain Rock Cats, the Twins's AA minor league affiliate. In 2015, he was the hitting coach for the Chattanooga Lookouts.

== See also ==
- List of Major League Baseball players named in the Mitchell Report
