= Jeff Williams (baseball) =

Australian baseball player (born 1972)

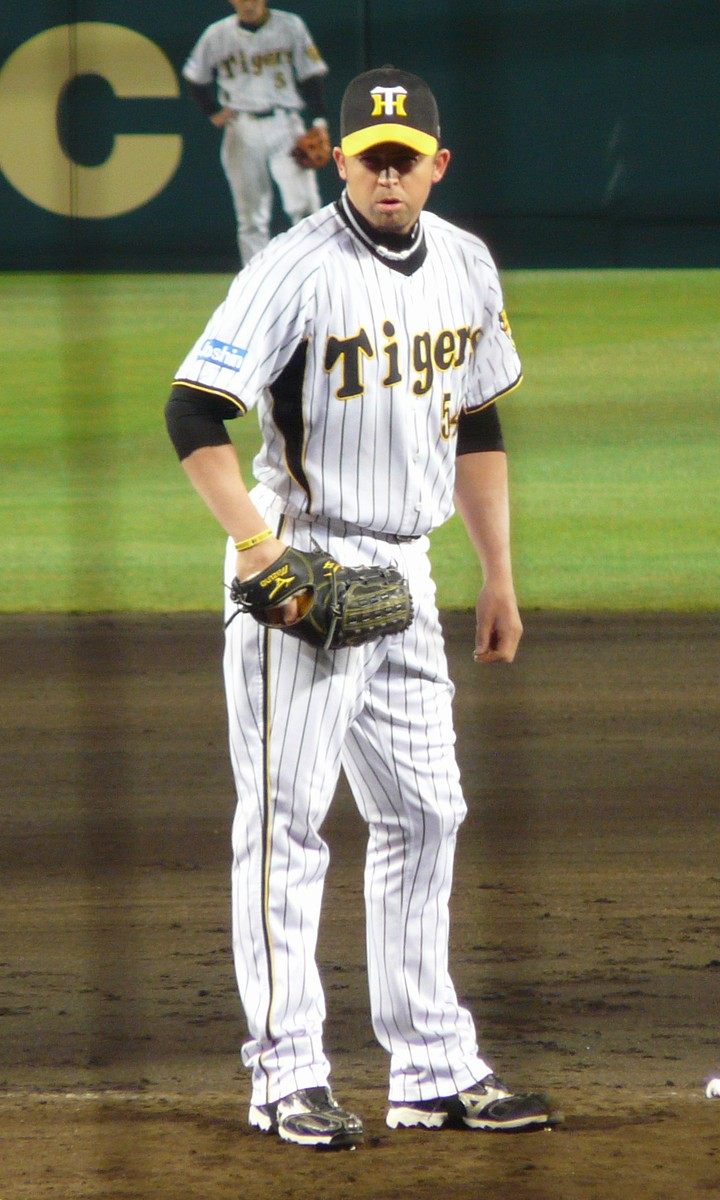
- Williams with the Hanshin Tigers
- Relief pitcher
- Born: 6 June 1972 (age 53); Canberra, Australia
- Batted: Right Threw: Left

Professional debut
- MLB: 12 September, 1999, for the Los Angeles Dodgers
- NPB: 29 March, 2003, for the Hanshin Tigers

Last appearance
- MLB: 28 September, 2002, for the Los Angeles Dodgers
- NPB: 20 July, 2009, for the Hanshin Tigers

NPB statistics
- Win–loss record: 16-17
- Earned run average: 2.20
- Strikeouts: 418

MLB statistics
- Win–loss record: 4-1
- Earned run average: 7.49
- Strikeouts: 30
- Stats at Baseball Reference

Teams
- Los Angeles Dodgers (1999–2002); Hanshin Tigers (2003–2009)

Olympic medal record

Men's baseball

Representing Australia
Silver medal – second place	2004 Athens	Team competition

Jeffrey Francis Williams (born 6 June 1972) is an Australian-born former left-handed pitcher who played for the Hanshin Tigers baseball team. He was a specialist set-up pitcher, or closer.

== Olympics ==
Williams pitched for the Australian Olympic baseball team in the 1996 Summer Olympics in Atlanta. The team placed 7th overall in the competition.

Williams again pitched for the Australian Olympic baseball team in the 2004 Summer Olympics in Athens, Greece. The Australian team was awarded the Silver Medal in the competition after losing in the final to the team from Cuba. Willams was credited with two saves during the tournament, including the semi-final game against Japan where he prevented the Japanese team from scoring, preserving the 1–0 win.

== Professional career ==
Williams was signed as an undrafted free agent by the Los Angeles Dodgers in 1996. Williams began his Major League Baseball career in September 1999 with the Los Angeles Dodgers, and pitched for the Dodgers until September 2002. While with the Dodgers in 2000 and 2001, the tandem of Williams and fellow Australian Luke Prokopec gained considerable popularity in the Los Angeles area. However, the attention was short-lived, as both moved on to other franchises.

In 2003, Williams signed with the Hanshin Tigers, and earned 25 saves as a closer (52 games), helping the Tigers win their first Central League championship in 18 years.

In 2004, he pitched in 51 games, earning 14 saves. In 2005, he reverted to the role of set-up pitcher, appearing in 75 games for the Hanshin Tigers, who won the championship.

Williams pitched for the Tigers for seven years through the 2009 season. He appeared in a total of 371 games and recorded 47 saves.

His performance as a set-up pitcher, combined with his set-up and closing pitcher teammates Kyuji Fujikawa and Tomoyuki Kubota respectively, was well known by fans and other teams. Their formation was given the nickname JFK by their team, using their initials from their pitching order (Jeff, Fujikawa, Kubota). The trio's efforts were crucial to the Tigers' success, especially when the starting pitching was not good. For example, in 2007 Hanshin's starting pitchers had a cumulative ERA of 4.45, the worst in the league, but their overall ERA was 3.56, best in the league.

After his retirement, Williams signed with the Tigers as a scout on 2 March 2011.

== Collegiate career ==
Williams played college ball for Southeastern Louisiana University in Hammond, Louisiana, from 1992 to 1996. In his senior year, Williams was selected as an NCAA Division I All-American; that year, he registered 125 strikeouts and 12 wins. In 2004, he was inducted into the SLU Lions Hall of Fame.

== Mitchell Report ==
On 13 December 2007, Williams was named as a player linked to performance-enhancing drug use in the Mitchell Report for Major League Baseball. In the report, Kirk Radomski claims he sold the steroids oxandrolone and metandienone to Williams. The document includes a photocopy of a February 2004 check from Williams to Radomski in the amount of $1,820 and mentions that Williams address and phone number were in Radomski's address book. Williams did not respond to a request to meet with Mitchell to address these accusations.

After the Mitchell Report became public, Hanshin Tigers club president Nobuo Minami defended Williams stating

"I trust him, He (Williams) flatly denied the use of any banned substances and said he is ready to accept fresh checkups at any time."

In Olympic competition and while playing in Japan, where they conform with Olympic testing standards, Williams has never tested positive for performance-enhancing drugs.

== See also ==
- List of Major League Baseball players named in the Mitchell Report
