= List of Major League Baseball players named in the Mitchell Report =

Players included in the Mitchell Report

The list of Major League Baseball players named in the Mitchell Report includes people who were active and former Major League players as well as free agents in 2007, when former US Senator George J. Mitchell's (D–ME) released the results of a 20-month investigation into performance-enhancing drug use in Major League Baseball (MLB). Inclusion on the list does not necessarily mean the player was involved in illegal activity. In some instances, insufficient evidence was provided to draw a conclusion, and some players were mentioned in other contexts.

The Mitchell Report said interviews were requested of five MLB players who had spoken out publicly about the use of steroids. Of these players, only one, Frank Thomas, was willing to be interviewed. The Mitchell Report stated that there was no evidence that any of these five had used performance-enhancing drugs. Curt Schilling, one of the four players who declined to interview with Mitchell, explained that he denied Mitchell's request because he "would have nothing to offer" Mitchell's investigation "other than personal opinion and hypotheticals."

Jason Giambi was forced to interview with Mitchell and his investigators by Commissioner Bud Selig under threat of discipline. This stemmed from Giambi's involvement with the BALCO investigation and statements he had given to the media.

== Implicated in the BALCO Scandal (9) ==
Major League players that were active at the time of the report are listed in bold italics.

Player	Mitchell Report allegation	Post-report player response	Career status following report
Marvin Benard	"After [Dusty] Baker learned of the allegations, he asked Benard if they were true. According to Baker, Benard admitted he had used steroids previously but said that he had stopped."		Last played in 2003.
**Barry Bonds**	Peter Magowan said in an interview that during a phone conversation he once asked Barry Bonds if he took steroids. Bonds replied that he used a substance for sleeping problems and arthritis. Magowan says Bonds claimed he did not try to hide his use of the substance from the rest of his team.		Did not play in Major leagues following 2007 season. See also Barry Bonds perjury case.
Bobby Estalella	Ellen Harrigan, an administrator in the Dodgers' scouting department, kept notes of a Dodgers meeting to discuss the possible signing of Estalella. Among the comments she recorded was an observation by one of the participants that Estalella was a "poster boy for the chemicals."		Last played in 2004. Agreed to testify against Barry Bonds.
**Jason Giambi**	In 2002, Greg Anderson, Jason Giambi's personal trainer, arranged a blood test for Giambi in which the player tested positive for Deca-Durabolin. Anderson warned Giambi to stop using that substance because it remains detectable long after use. He suggested an alternative regimen of performance-enhancing drugs that, if followed, would never be detected by the MLB's tests, which were to begin in 2003.		Continued playing, retired February 16, 2015, with the Cleveland Indians. Final player in the entire Mitchell Report to retire.
Jeremy Giambi	Jeremy Giambi told the Kansas City Star that he used steroids while in MLB, and apologized.		Last played in 2003. Testified against Barry Bonds in perjury case. Died in 2022.
Armando Ríos	Ríos was included in a client list that Victor Conte gave to federal agents following a raid on his BALCO establishment.		Last played in 2003.
Benito Santiago	In 2003, a Giants clubhouse attendant found syringes in Santiago's locker. He brought them to Stan Conte, the Giants' trainer, who replied saying he "would take care of it". The attendant recalled that assistant trainer Dave Groeschner also was present at the time.		Last played in 2005.
**Gary Sheffield**	A Sheffield FedEx receipt to BALCO in February 2003 was cited by federal agents for their search warrant on Greg Anderson's condominium.		Last played in 2009.
Randy Velarde	Velarde admitted through his lawyer that he obtained performance-enhancing substances from Greg Anderson in 2003.		Last played in 2002.

== Identified as clients of Kirk Radomski (53) ==
*	Gave interview(s) to investigators
**Bold italics**	Active at the time of the report

Major League players that were active at the time of the report are listed in bold italics. If a player responded to allegations after the release of the report, their response appears in the last column, "Post-report player response".

Player	Mitchell Report allegation	Post-report player response
Chad Allen*	Admitted to purchasing Winstrol from Radomski and using it during the 2003 off-season in order to accelerate his recovery from a knee injury.	"I think a lot of people were surprised to see my name... I made a mistake. I know I am going to pay for it. I did something wrong five years ago out of stupidity. If somebody holds that against me, it is their decision. But I certainly wasn't going to lie."
Mike Bell*	Admitted to purchasing one human growth hormone kit from Radomski and using "most of it", during the 2003 off-season.	"I'm glad all this stuff came out, and I can move on and concentrate on next year." "I have a chance to show people that I made a mistake. Things are tough at times, but you just gotta persevere through it. I can't take back what I did, but I can turn it into a positive." "I don't think this defines who I am."
**Gary Bennett***	Made one purchase of two kits of human growth hormone from Radomski. Radomski provided a check to Mitchell which showed the $3,200 transaction. Bennett declined interview.	Bennett admitted to using HGH in 2003 to heal from a knee injury.
**Larry Bigbie***	Admitted to purchasing and using a variety of performance-enhancing substances from Radomski from 2001 to 2005, including human growth hormone, Deca-Durabolin, Sustanon, testosterone, and anti-estrogen drugs.	
Kevin Brown	Purchased human growth hormone and Deca-Durabolin from Radomski. Radomski provided to Mitchell the overnight shipping parcels Brown used to send him cash payments, which used his agent's business address as his return address. Brown declined interview.	In 2009, Brown's agent, Scott Boras, was asked specifically about Brown's alleged use of Boras' business address for mailing money to Radomski. Boras said "Kevin Brown has no knowledge of it. I don't think there is any accuracy to that." Brown has not addressed the report personally or more generally.
Mark Carreon	Radomski claimed he sold Dianabol pills to Carreon in 1996, but was unable to produce evidence of any transactions. Carreon did not respond to requests for interview.	"Regarding the Mitchell Report, the following is true – towards the end of my 18-year career, regretfully on one occasion I experimented with a performance-enhancing substance, however, the remaining 17 years were unscathed by this one error in judgment. One point that should be made. I received a certified letter requesting my response to these allegations merely 24 hours prior to the release, leaving little time to act. Meanwhile, here in the present, I support the challenge that lay before the Players Association, current players and owners in restoring the great game of baseball."
Jason Christiansen	Purchased one human growth hormone kit from Radomski in 2002. Radomski provided a check to Mitchell showing the $1,600 transaction. Christiansen did not respond to requests for interview.	
**Howie Clark**	Radomski claimed he sold Clark four or five kits of human growth hormone and provided two money orders showing a $1,200 total transaction for one of the purchases. Clark declined interview.	
**Roger Clemens**	Interviews with José Canseco and trainer Brian McNamee stated that Clemens used human growth hormone, Deca-Durabolin, Winstrol, Sustanon, and possibly Anadrol, during the 1998, 2000, and 2001 MLB seasons, some of which he obtained through McNamee from Radomski. Radomski corroborated these allegations as far as to say that he sold performance-enhancing drugs to McNamee in amounts that were clearly for redistribution. Clemens declined interview.	On December 18, Clemens (through his agent) denied taking steroids, human growth hormone, or any other banned substance(s) in his life. He stated that his opinion of such substances were "a dangerous and destructive shortcut that no athlete should ever take." Clemens said he would publicly address all of Mitchell's questions at the appropriate time. On December 23, Clemens issued an unconditional denial through YouTube. Clemens told his side of the story in an interview on CBS' "60 Minutes" that aired on January 6, 2008. Furthermore, Clemens' attorney's law firm is conducting its own investigation into the allegations. On the night that the 60 Minutes interview aired, Clemens filed a defamation suit against McNamee in a Texas state court, and one of McNamee's attorneys responded by saying that McNamee would likely countersue in New York.
**Jack Cust**	Larry Bigbie claimed that Cust told him he tried steroids and had a source that could procure anything he wanted. Cust declined interview.	In an interview on January 27, 2008, with Bay Area media, Cust denied ever using performance-enhancing drugs. "No. No. Not even one game". "He [Larry Bigbie] was a teammate of mine five years ago and we haven't talked since. I don't remember any conversations about [steroids]. He might have misinterpreted something I said, but I don't remember anything".
**Brendan Donnelly**	Radomski claimed he sold Deca-Durabolin to Donnelly on one occasion for $250 to $300. Donnelly declined interview.	Donnelly admitted contacting Radomski in 2004 regarding Anavar, hoping it would help him recover from injuries faster. But Donnelly denied ever buying or using the drug because he was made aware that it was considered a steroid.
Chris Donnels*	Admitted to purchasing steroids and human growth hormone from Radomski. Radomski provided a number of checks from Donnels totaling $9,950.	
Lenny Dykstra	Radomski claimed he sold Deca-Durabolin, Dianabol and testosterone to Dykstra after the 1993 season. After 2000, Dykstra reportedly discussed his past steroid use with the Commissioner's Office. Dykstra declined interview.	
Matt Franco*	Radomski claimed that he provided steroids for Franco in 2000. In a telephone interview with Mitchell, Franco denied ordering steroids from or even knowing Radomski.	In August 2010, Franco reiterated his denial. He told the Daily News, "It wasn't part of my game."
**Ryan Franklin**	Radomski claimed that Franklin purchased Anavar and Deca-Durabolin from him through another Radomski client and then-Mariners teammate, Ron Villone. Franklin was suspended for ten games in August 2005 for testing positive for steroids. Franklin declined interview.	
**Éric Gagné**	Radomski claimed he sold Gagné two kits of human growth hormone. Radomski provided a shipping receipt of a package Radomski sent to Gagné. The report also details that the Dodgers and Red Sox were aware of Gagné's possible use of performance-enhancing drugs. Gagné declined interview.	In a February 2010 interview with the Los Angeles Times, Gagné admitted that he had used HGH, saying that it was to recover from a knee injury.
Jason Grimsley	Purchased human growth hormone, Deca-Durabolin, and diet pills from Radomski from 2000 through 2005. Radomski produced fourteen checks and cashier's checks showing the transactions, which totaled $35,400. Grimsley declined a request for meeting with Mitchell.	
**Jerry Hairston Jr.**	A DEA investigation showed that Hairston received performance-enhancing substances from Ana Maria Santi, who later pleaded guilty to charges of illegally prescribing performance-enhancing drugs. Records indicate that Hairston received shipments of Genotropin (human growth hormone), hCG, and clomiphene citrate in May 2004. Hairston denied these allegations. Radomski provided a check from Hairston that he claims was for human growth hormone. Hairston declined interview.	
**Matt Herges**	Radomski provided a check from Herges for $3,240 that he claims was for two kits of human growth hormone. Herges declined interview. Around May 1999, Todd Seyler, a minor league strength and conditioning coach, began to speak to players, including Herges, about performance-enhancing drugs. Seyler stated that the players were to give money to Herges or Paul Lo Duca, so they could purchase steroids. Seyler recalled that, in July 1999, Ricky Stone, Herges, Mike Judd, Lo Duca and Jeff Williams met at Stone's apartment and injected steroids. Seyler claimed he observed Herges inject himself in the buttocks with Deca-Durabolin. Based on Seyler's conversations with the players, he believed they continued to use the steroids in their training.	On February 13, 2008, Herges admitted to his HGH usage and apologized for it.
Phil Hiatt	Radomski claimed he sold Hiatt human growth hormone and Deca-Durabolin two or three times. Hiatt declined interview.	
Glenallen Hill*	Purchased human growth hormone from Radomski in 2001. Radomski provided a check showing the $3,200 transaction. Hill, as a current non-player employee of a ball club, was required to consent to an interview, in which he admitted to purchasing Sustanon from Radomski. Hill denied ever using the materials he purchased.	On February 13, 2008, Hill admitted to his use of performance-enhancing substances late in his career and subsequently apologized for using them.
Todd Hundley	Radomski claimed he sold Deca-Durabolin and testosterone to Hundley on three or four occasions, and the player's contact information was found in his address book. Chris Donnels confirmed that Hundley discussed his use of performance-enhancing drugs with him. Hundley declined interview.	
David Justice	Radomski claimed he sold two or three kits of human growth hormone to Justice. Brian McNamee confirmed that Justice admitted to him that he obtained human growth hormone from Radomski. In an interview prior to the surfacing of these allegations, Justice denied having used performance-enhancing drugs. After the allegations, Justice did not respond to requests for interview.	After the Mitchell Report was released, Justice appeared on ESPN Radio's The Herd, and stated that McNamee encouraged him to use human growth hormone in 2000, but he declined, saying he did not like needles. Justice also stated that he had never met Radomski. He also appeared on The Michael Kay Show on 1050 ESPN New York and claimed he never received any requests to be interviewed before the report was released, possibly due to the fact that he had switched cell phone numbers a few times since initially speaking to Mitchell investigators.
Chuck Knoblauch	Brian McNamee claimed he obtained human growth hormone from Radomski, which he provided and injected Knoblauch with seven to nine times. Knoblauch paid Radomski through Jason Grimsley and McNamee. Knoblauch declined interview.	On January 11, 2008, Knoblauch made his first public statement about his inclusion in the Mitchell Report. As he had been retired for five years, he expressed "bewilderment at his inclusion" in the report and stated that "I have nothing to defend and I have nothing to hide at the same time." In 2011, he admitted to using HGH: "I did HGH. It didn't help me out. It didn't make me any better. I had the worst years of my career from a batting average standpoint. And I got hurt. So there was no good that came out of it for me – it was not performance-enhancing for me."
Tim Laker*	As a current non-player team employee, Laker was required to consent to an interview, in which he admitted to purchasing Deca-Durabolin and testosterone from Radomski from 1995 to 1999.	In March 2008, Laker admitted regretting his decision to take performance-enhancing drugs stating "I made a poor decision, a mistake, and all I can do is ask for forgiveness and move on."
Mike Lansing	Purchased testosterone and one kit of human growth hormone from Radomski. Radomski provided two money orders showing the $2,000 total transaction. Lansing declined interview.	
**Paul Lo Duca**	Purchased six kits of human growth hormone from Radomski. Radomski provided three checks showing transactions of $3,200 each, which Radomski says were each for two kits of human growth hormone. Lo Duca declined interview. Around May 1999, Todd Seyler, a minor league strength and conditioning coach, began to speak to players, including Lo Duca, about performance-enhancing drugs. Seyler stated that the players were to give money to Matt Herges or Lo Duca, so they could purchase steroids. Seyler recalled that, in July 1999, Ricky Stone, Herges, Mike Judd, Lo Duca and Jeff Williams met at Stone's apartment and injected steroids. Seyler claimed he observed Judd inject himself with either Deca-Durabolin or Winstrol. Based on Seyler's conversations with the players, he believed they continued to use the steroids in their training.	In a statement released by the Washington Nationals, Lo Duca said "In regards to Senator Mitchell's report, I apologize to my family, all of my fans and to the entire baseball community for mistakes in judgment I made in the past and for the distraction that has resulted." He continued, "So that I can focus on making positive contributions and avoid creating further distractions, I respectfully decline to comment any further on the content of the Mitchell report."
**Nook Logan**	Radomski claimed he sold one kit of human growth hormone to Logan in 2005, after a referral from Rondell White. Logan declined interview.	In 2013, Logan said his intent in taking HGH was not to improve his performance but his health. Logan felt that he was blacklisted from baseball because of the Report. He said "I didn't get to play in the prime of my career because people think what I was doing was on the field was because of something I took."
Josías Manzanillo	Radomski claimed he injected Manzanillo with Deca-Durabolin while with the New York Mets. He denied ever selling steroids to Manzanillo. Manzanillo, in a statement submitted to Mitchell, admitted to making one purchase of steroids from Radomski, but denied ever using them.	
Cody McKay	Radomski claimed he sold steroids to McKay on at least two occasions. McKay declined interview.	
**Kent Mercker**	Radomski claimed he sold human growth hormone to Mercker in 2002. Radomski provided a check from Mercker for $1,600 and a shipping receipt. Mercker declined interview.	
Bart Miadich	Radomski claimed he frequently sold small quantities of testosterone and Winstrol to Miadich from 2002 through 2005, after a referral from Adam Riggs. In his interview with Mitchell, Chad Allen stated that Miadich frequently suffered from "roid rage". Miadich did not reply to interview requests.	
Hal Morris	Radomski claimed he sold Deca-Durabolin and testosterone to Morris in 1999. Morris, in a statement submitted to Mitchell, denied ever using performance-enhancing drugs.	
Denny Neagle	Radomski claimed he sold human growth hormone and steroids to Neagle five or six times between 2000 and 2004. Radomski produced eight checks that were either from Neagle or he claimed were sent to him on Neagle's behalf. Neagle declined interview.	
**Jim Parque**	Radomski claimed that he twice sold human growth hormone to Parque and once "check(ed) out" a sample of Winstrol sent to him by Parque. Radomski produced two checks from Parque totalling $4,800. Parque declined interview.	In a Chicago Sun-Times interview that took place in July 2009, Parque admitted using HGH, as he explained that "With my career in jeopardy, I turned to performance-enhancing drugs, like some other players did", Parque wrote for the Sun-Times. "I never had needed them before, but with a shoulder that wouldn't heal, it was realistically the only thing I could turn to."
**Andy Pettitte**	Brian McNamee, who obtained performance-enhancing drugs from Radomski, claimed that he provided Pettitte with human growth hormone in 2002. He also claimed that he injected Pettitte with HGH two to four times while assisting Pettitte with his rehabilitation from an elbow injury. Pettitte declined interview.	After the Mitchell Report was made public, Pettitte released a statement admitting his use of human growth hormone on two occasions in 2002, which he says was only intended to accelerate his recovery from an elbow injury.
Adam Piatt*	Admitted to purchasing human growth hormone and testosterone from Radomski in 2002 and 2003. Radomski produced eight checks from Piatt totaling $11,550.	
**Todd Pratt**	Radomski claimed he sold steroids to Pratt once or twice in 2000 or 2001. Pratt did not respond to interview requests.	
**Stephen Randolph**	Radomski claimed he sold human growth hormone to Randolph in 2003 or 2004. Randolph declined interview.	In February 2008, Randolph did not address the specifics of the report but said "I don’t let i[t] faze me. I just want to come out here and make the [Houston Astros] and go about my business every day." "There’s nothing I can do about it. It’s there, and I’m glad they’re cleaning up the game. That’s about it."
Adam Riggs	Radomski claimed he sold human growth hormone, clenbuterol, and Winstrol to Riggs from 2003 to 2005. Radomski produced four checks totaling $1,150 and one check whose amount was illegible. Riggs, in a letter from his lawyer, stated that he never tested positive for performance-enhancing drugs.	
**Brian Roberts**	Larry Bigbie stated that Roberts admitted to him that he used steroids. Roberts declined interview.	In an interview with the Baltimore Sun, Roberts admitted to once using steroids in 2003. He stated that it was a "terrible decision" and claimed he has not used performance-enhancing drugs since.
F. P. Santangelo	Radomski claimed he sold one kit of human growth hormone to Santangelo in 2000. Radomski produced one check showing the $1,400 transaction. Radomski also claims to have sold Deca-Durabolin and testosterone to Santangelo in 2001. Adam Piatt also stated that Santangelo provided Piatt with Radomski's contact information when Piatt asked where he could get performance-enhancing substances. Santangelo declined interview.	After the Mitchell Report was made public, Santangelo admitted to using human growth hormone. He denied ever using or purchasing steroids from Radomski.
David Segui*	Radomski claimed he sold Deca-Durabolin to Segui. Radomski produced six checks showing the transactions. Radomski also claimed that Segui was receiving human growth hormone from a doctor in Florida because of a growth hormone deficiency. Segui, in a telephone interview with Mitchell, acknowledged his relationship with Radomski, and declined to be interviewed in person. He also made his use of the substances public in a statement to ESPN in 2006.	
**Mike Stanton**	Radomski claimed he met Stanton around 2001 and then sold him three kits of human growth hormone in 2003, which he either mailed to the player or dropped off at his locker. Stanton declined interview.	After the Mitchell Report was made public, Stanton released a statement flatly denying his purchase of human growth hormone. "I've done absolutely nothing wrong", Stanton told MLB.com in a statement by phone. "I've never met Radomski and couldn't even pick him out of a lineup. The reports are outrageous and unfair."
**Miguel Tejada**	During his interview with Mitchell, Adam Piatt claimed that he obtained Deca-Durabolin or testosterone, as well as human growth hormone from Radomski for Tejada. Piatt produced checks from Tejada totalling $6,300. Radomski confirmed the sale to Piatt and claimed that Piatt said the purchases were for Tejada, but Radomski stated that he never sold directly to Tejada. Tejada declined interview.	
Mo Vaughn	Radomski claimed he sold human growth hormone to Vaughn, for which Radomski produced three checks totaling $8,600. Vaughn declined interview.	Vaughn admitted for the first time in 2025 that he injected HGH into his injured knee during his playing career.
**Ron Villone**	Radomski claimed he sold six kits of human growth hormone to Villone from 2004 to 2005. Villone's contact information was found in Radomski's address book. Villone declined interview.	The day the report was released, Villone directed Tyler Kepner's questions to his attorney but told him "It’s a serious situation, and I’m trying to take it as serious. It’s my name, and I’m going to treat my name with respect and the game of baseball with respect."
Fernando Viña	Radomski claimed he sold human growth hormone, Winstrol, and Deca-Durabolin to Viña from 2000 to 2005. Radomski produced three checks showing some of the transactions. Viña did not respond to interview requests.	In an ESPN interview that took place on December 17, 2007, Viña admitted using HGH in 2003 to heal injuries, as he explained that "everything rehabbing" did not work and he was "desperate". Viña feels "embarrassed", and denies any claims of buying steroids from Radomski.
**Rondell White**	Radomski claimed he sold human growth hormone and Deca-Durabolin to White from 2000 to at least 2005. Radomski provided seven checks showing some of the transactions. White declined interview.	
**Jeff Williams**	Radomski claimed he sold Anavar and Dianabol to Williams in 2004. Radomski produced a check from Williams for $1,820. Williams did not respond to interview requests. Around May 1999, Todd Seyler, a minor league strength and conditioning coach, began to speak to players, including Williams, about performance-enhancing drugs. Seyler stated that the players were to give money to Matt Herges or Paul Lo Duca, so they could purchase steroids. Seyler recalled that, in July 1999, Ricky Stone, Herges, Mike Judd, Lo Duca and Williams met at Stone's apartment and injected steroids. Seyler claimed he observed Williams inject himself in the buttocks with Deca-Durabolin. Based on Seyler's conversations with the players, he believed they continued to use the steroids in their training.	According to Hanshin Tigers club president Nobuo Minami "He (Williams) flatly denied the use of any banned substances and said he is ready to accept fresh checkups at any time."
**Todd Williams**	Radomski claimed he sold Winstrol to Williams once in 2001. Williams did not respond to interview requests.	
Kevin Young	Radomski claimed he sold human growth hormone to Young multiple times between 2000 and 2003. Young did not respond to interview requests.	
**Gregg Zaun**	Radomski claimed he sold Deca-Durabolin and Winstrol to Zaun in 2001, after a referral from Jason Grimsley. Radomski produced a check from Zaun for $500. Mitchell also explained that former Montreal Expos bullpen catcher Luis Perez claimed to have supplied Zaun with steroids in 2002. Zaun declined interview.	Zaun issued a denial the night the report was released. In a February 2008 interview, he claimed he wrote a check for $500 and gave it to Grimsley either to settle a bet or pay back money he owed. He alleged he kept the recipient blank at Grimsley's request and Grimsley wrote in Radomski's name. He claimed not to know Perez.

== Mentioned in connection to Signature Pharmacy (16) ==
Eight current major league players and eight former major league players were mentioned in the media as purchasers of performance-enhancing drugs from Signature Pharmacy and several rejuvenation centers. Several online pharmacies (Signature Pharmacy being one of them), anti-aging clinics and doctors that have issued prescriptions for performance-enhancing drugs have been under investigation by federal and state authorities. Mitchell requested the 16 players interview with him, but only José Canseco accepted his offer.

Major League players that were active at the time of the report are listed in bold italics.

Player	Mitchell Report allegation	Post-report player response
**Rick Ankiel**	In a September 2007 article, the New York Daily News reported that Ankiel received eight shipments of human growth hormone from Signature Pharmacy in 2004. According to the article, Ankiel received a prescription from a doctor at a Florida anti-aging clinic. In September 2007, Ankiel admitted to using HGH, though claimed that he did so legally under a doctor's care. Ankiel met with the Commissioner's Office regarding this situation, and Commissioner Bud Selig did not impose any discipline.	
David Bell	In a March 2007 article, Sports Illustrated reported that Bell received six shipments of human chorionic gonadotropin (hCG) in 2005 from Applied Pharmacy Services of Alabama. According to the article, Bell received a prescription from an Arizona anti-aging clinic. Bell acknowledged to SI that he received the hCG and stated that they were issued under a valid prescription.	
**Paul Byrd**	In an October 2007 article, the San Francisco Chronicle reported that Byrd had received at least thirteen shipments of human growth hormone between 2002 and 2005 worth approximately $25,000 from a Florida anti-aging clinic. In response to the article, which was printed the same day that Byrd and the Cleveland Indians played the Boston Red Sox in Game 7 of the 2007 American League Championship Series, Byrd stated that the HGH was legally prescribed for a pituitary disorder (it was later discovered that the prescribing doctor was an unlicensed dentist). Byrd also stated that he had notified Major League Baseball of this condition and that he had received permission to use HGH. Major League Baseball denied receiving such notice and stated that MLB has never given a player permission to use HGH.	
José Canseco	In a March 2007 article, Sports Illustrated reported that Canseco received shipments of human growth hormone, testosterone, stanozolol, human chorionic gonadotropin, and 340 syringes from Applied Pharmacy Services of Alabama. According to the article, Canseco had received a prescription for these materials from a Florida anti-aging clinic. In a telephone interview with Canseco's attorney, Canseco confirmed these purchases to Mitchell.	
**Jay Gibbons**	In a September 2007 article, Sports Illustrated reported that Gibbons received several shipments of human growth hormone, testosterone, and human chorionic gonadotropin from Signature Pharmacy from 2003 to 2005. According to the article, Gibbons received a prescription for these materials from a Florida anti-aging clinic. One of Gibbons' prescribing doctors, Ana Maria Santi, pleaded guilty to federal and state charges of illegally prescribing performance-enhancing drugs. Gibbons met with the Commissioner's Office regarding this situation, and Commissioner Bud Selig suspended Gibbons for the first 15 days of the 2008 season. After receiving the suspension, Gibbons acknowledged and apologized for his use of performance-enhancing drugs.	
**Troy Glaus**	In a September 2007 article, Sports Illustrated reported that Glaus received shipments of nandrolone and testosterone from Signature Pharmacy from 2003 to 2004. According to the article, Glaus had received a prescription for these materials from a California anti-aging clinic. One of Glaus' prescribing doctors, Ramon Scruggs, had his medical license suspended for making illegal prescriptions. Glaus met with the Commissioner's Office regarding this situation, and Commissioner Bud Selig did not impose any discipline.	
Jason Grimsley	Grimsley was identified during a federal investigation as a Signature Pharmacy customer who had received human growth hormone. After a raid on his home, Grimsley cooperated with federal investigators. Grimsley indicated to investigators that he was referred to a Florida anti-aging clinic by former teammate David Segui.	
**José Guillén**	In a November 2007 article, the San Francisco Chronicle reported that Guillén had received numerous shipments of human growth hormone, testosterone, nandrolone, stanozolol, clomiphene, Novarel (a brand of hCG) and syringes between 2002 and 2005 from a Florida anti-aging clinic. According to the article, at least one of Guillén's prescriptions was issued by the same unlicensed dentist that prescribed HGH to Paul Byrd. Guillén met with the Commissioner's Office regarding this situation, and Commissioner Bud Selig suspended Guillén for the first 15 days of the 2008 season. Guillén has since appealed his suspension.	
**Jerry Hairston Jr.**	A DEA investigation showed that Hairston received performance-enhancing substances from Applied Pharmacy in Alabama. The prescribing doctor, Ana Maria Santi, later pleaded guilty to federal and state charges of illegally prescribing performance-enhancing drugs. Records indicate that Hairston received shipments of Genotropin (human growth hormone), human chorionic gonadotropin, and clomiphene citrate in May 2004. Hairston denied these allegations.	
Darren Holmes	In a March 2007 article, Sports Illustrated reported that Holmes received a shipment of human growth hormone and testosterone in 2003 from a Florida anti-aging clinic. Holmes admitted purchasing the HGH and stated that while he received the testosterone, he did not order it. Holmes also denied ever using the HGH.	
**Gary Matthews Jr.**	In a February 2007 article, the Albany Times Union reported that Matthews received a shipment of human growth hormone in 2004 from Applied Pharmacy Services of Alabama. According to the article, Matthews received a prescription from a Florida anti-aging clinic. After the article's release, Matthews denied ever using HGH. Chad Allen, during his interview with Mitchell, claimed that he had found unused syringes after Matthews had moved out of Allen's Dallas apartment. Allen lent the apartment to Matthews during the 2004 season. Matthews met with the Commissioner's Office regarding this situation, and Commissioner Bud Selig did not impose any discipline.	
John Rocker	In a March 2007 article, Sports Illustrated reported that Rocker received two shipments of human growth hormone in 2003 from Applied Pharmacy Services of Alabama. After an initial denial, Rocker acknowledged that he received the HGH under a valid prescription.	In February 2008, Rocker said in a radio interview "in 2000 Bud Selig knew John Rocker was taking the juice" and "between 40 to 50 percent of baseball players are on steroids."
**Scott Schoeneweis**	In October 2007, ESPN reported that Schoeneweis received shipments of steroids, including stanozolol and testosterone from Signature Pharmacy from 2003 to 2004. According to the article, Schoeneweis spent $1,160 on the substances. Schoeneweis' prescribing doctor, Ramon Scruggs (who was also named in the allegations surrounding Troy Glaus), had his medical license suspended for making illegal prescriptions. Schoeneweis met with the Commissioner's Office regarding this situation, and Commissioner Bud Selig did not impose any discipline.	
Ismael Valdéz	In a November 2007 article, the San Francisco Chronicle reported that Valdéz received shipments of human growth hormone, Novarel (a brand of hCG), clomiphene and Arimidex in 2002 from a Florida anti-aging clinic. According to the article, Valdéz received a prescription from the same unlicensed dentist implicated in the situations surrounding Paul Byrd, José Guillén and Matt Williams.	
Matt Williams	In a November 2007 article, the San Francisco Chronicle reported that Williams received shipments of human growth hormone, testosterone, Novarel, clomiphene, nandrolone and syringes in 2002 from a Florida anti-aging clinic. According to the article, Williams received a prescription from the same unlicensed dentist implicated in the situations surrounding Paul Byrd, José Guillén and Ismael Valdéz. According to the article, Williams admitted to being prescribed HGH after undergoing a number of medical tests. He did not address the use or purchase of other steroids and denied knowing the dentist who supplied his prescriptions.	
Steve Woodard	In a September 2007 article, the New York Daily News reported that Woodard received a shipment of human growth hormone and steroids from a Florida anti-aging clinic. The article did not specify when that shipment occurred.	

== Identified through direct interview (2) ==
Player	Mitchell Report allegation	Post-report player response
Daniel Naulty	Naulty expressed remorse for his admitted use of steroid and human growth hormone over several years as a player in both the major league and the minor leagues during a telephone interview with Mitchell Report investigators.	
Wally Joyner	"In an interview for this investigation, Joyner told us that he struggled with the decision whether to try steroids, but eventually he decided to use them. After taking the drugs three times, Joyner decided that he had made a mistake, discarded the rest of the pills, and never tried illegal performance-enhancing substances again."	

== Identified through other means (7) ==
Player	Mitchell Report allegation	Post-report player response
Manny Alexander	On June 30, 2000, police discovered steroids and two hypodermic needles in the glove box of Alexander's vehicle. Alexander had loaned the vehicle to a clubhouse employee of the Red Sox, Carlos Cowart, and Cowart and a friend of his were sitting in the parked vehicle when the officers approached, in the belief that the vehicle might have been stolen.	
Ricky Bones	In June 2000, a clubhouse attendant with the Florida Marlins discovered syringes and two kinds of steroids (stanozolol and nandrolone decanoate) in a paper bag inside Bones's locker. When questioned by Mitchell, Bones admitted that he had procured the steroids from a doctor in his native Puerto Rico and then administered them to himself.	
Alex Cabrera	In September 2000, a package intended for Cabrera was delivered to the Arizona Diamondbacks' clubhouse. Clubhouse attendants reported the package to the trainers and told Cabrera the package was lost. League officials tested the contents of the package and discovered it contained anabolic steroids (Winstrol) and over-the-counter diet pills. Through investigation of the package, Major League Baseball discovered that "players with the El Paso Diablos, a minor league affiliate of the Diamondbacks, regularly crossed the border into Mexico to purchase steroids." Cabrera was unable to be tested regarding the package, but denied ever having used steroids after the report was released.	
Paxton Crawford	Crawford admitted to using human growth hormone and steroids while playing for the Boston Red Sox in 2001 and 2002. In an article in ESPN The Magazine, Crawford recounted an incident where syringes had fallen on the floor of the locker room, causing other players to laugh. Crawford declined to be interviewed for the Mitchell investigation stating he did not "do that stuff anymore." Other Red Sox players deny the syringe-dropping incident ever happened.	
Juan González	On October 4, 2001, an unmarked bag in the Indians' team luggage was detained by Canadian customs in Toronto. González's assistant said that the bag belonged to Angel Presinal, a prominent personal trainer for a number of professional players, but Presinal claimed that the bag belonged to González. Canadian customs then interviewed Gonzalez, who said he had no knowledge of the bag's contents and said he had sent it down to be included with the team's luggage at Presinal's request.	Not only was the ownership of the bag disputed, but also whether the bag actually contained steroids. Although Presinal claimed the bag was not his, he said that he was aware of its contents and that they were not in fact steroids. He stated that the bag contained Soladek (a painkiller), Dolo-neurobion (a vitamin B complex used in fighting the flu), and Clenbuterol (a stimulant similar to ephedrine, which is believed by some to promote muscle tone and weight loss, but not a steroid according to the Mitchell Report). González immediately cut ties with the trainer following the incident. In 2007, ESPN published an article on its website about Presinal, describing him as "fitness guru, massage therapist and personal trainer to baseball's Latino elite." In the same article, ESPN asked John Hart, the Indians' former general manager, about the 2001 incident involving Presinal. Hart said that the team looked into the matter and ultimately exonerated Gonzalez. Like his former teammate, hall-of-famer Iván Rodríguez, González has consistently stated over the years that he has never taken steroids, and is in fact a vegetarian. In a 2007 interview with USA Today, González said, "I've always said whenever they want to test me, they can. I've never tested positive or used any of those things." In a 2010 interview with ESPNDeportes.com in Puerto Rico, Gonzalez said players' legacies will forever be questioned after Jose Canseco wrote in 2005 that he introduced several players to steroids and PEDs and former Sen. George Mitchell produced a report for Major League Baseball in 2007 about the use of banned substances in the game. "It will affect [us]," said Gonzalez. "The media is going to be driven by this whenever my name and others are mentioned. I never used any of that stuff." "I have nothing to hide," said González. "Nothing. And I offered to be tested, whenever they wanted. If you have nothing to hide, there is nothing to worry [about]," González said.
Mike Judd	Around May 1999, Todd Seyler, a minor league strength and conditioning coach, began to speak to players, including Judd, about performance-enhancing drugs. Seyler stated that the players were to give money to Matt Herges or Paul Lo Duca, so they could purchase steroids. Seyler recalled that, in July 1999, Ricky Stone, Herges, Judd, Lo Duca and Jeff Williams met at Stone's apartment and injected steroids. Seyler claimed he observed Judd inject himself with either Deca-Durabolin or Winstrol. Based on Seyler's conversations with the players, he believed they continued to use the steroids in their training. Judd did not respond to a request to interview with Mitchell.	
Ricky Stone	Around May 1999, Todd Seyler, a minor league strength and conditioning coach, began to speak to players, including Stone, about performance-enhancing drugs. Seyler stated that the players were to give money to Matt Herges or Paul Lo Duca so they could purchase steroids. Seyler recalled that, in July 1999, Stone, Herges, Mike Judd, Lo Duca and Jeff Williams met at Stone's apartment and injected steroids. Seyler claimed he observed Stone inject himself in the thigh with Deca-Durabolin. Based on Seyler's conversations with the players, he believed they continued to use the steroids in their training. Stone did not respond to a request to interview with Mitchell.	

== See also ==
- List of Major League Baseball players suspended for performance-enhancing drugs
