= Larry Bigbie =

American baseball player (born 1977)

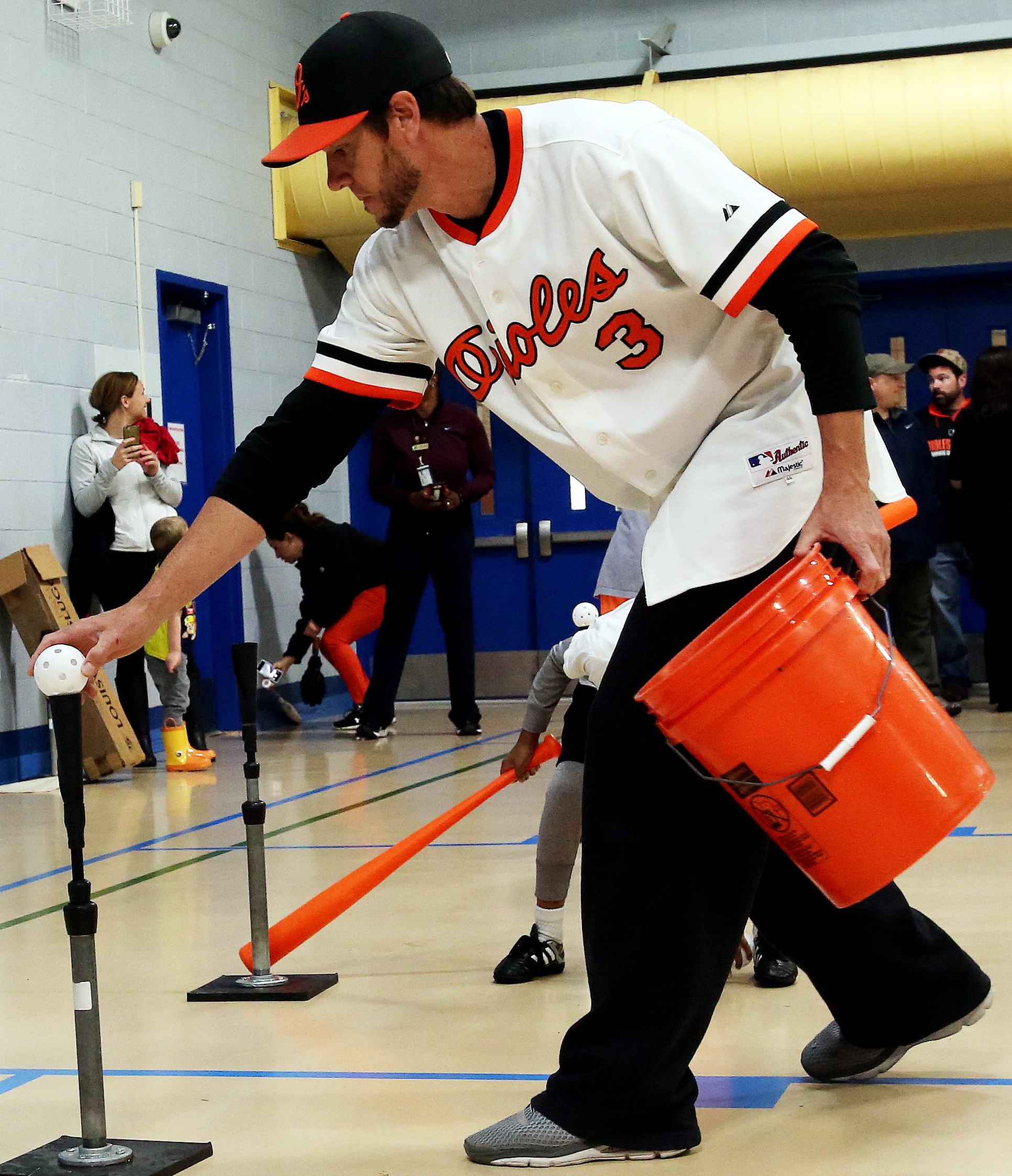
- Bigbie in 2017
- Left fielder
- Born: November 4, 1977 (age 49); Hobart, Indiana, U.S.
- Batted: Left Threw: Right

Professional debut
- MLB: June 23, 2001, for the Baltimore Orioles
- NPB: April 13, 2008, for the Yokohama Bay Stars

Last appearance
- MLB: June 4, 2006, for the St. Louis Cardinals
- NPB: August 15, 2008, for the Yokohama Bay Stars

MLB statistics
- Batting average: .267
- Home runs: 31
- Runs batted in: 137

NPB statistics
- Batting average: .255
- Home runs: 8
- Runs batted in: 29
- Stats at Baseball Reference

Teams
- Baltimore Orioles (2001–2005); Colorado Rockies (2005); St. Louis Cardinals (2006); Yokohama Bay Stars (2008)

Larry Robert Bigbie (born November 4, 1977) is an American former professional baseball first baseman and outfielder. He played in Major League Baseball from 2001 through 2006 for the Baltimore Orioles, Colorado Rockies, and St. Louis Cardinals.

== Career ==
Bigbie attended Ball State University. In 1998, he played collegiate summer baseball with the Wareham Gatemen of the Cape Cod Baseball League.

Bigbie was drafted by the Baltimore Orioles in the 1st round (21st pick overall) of the 1999 Major League Baseball amateur draft and played over four years (2001–2005) for the Orioles before being traded during the 2005 season to the Colorado Rockies.

Bigbie played the remainder of 2005 season for the Rockies. On December 8, 2005, the Rockies traded him and Aaron Miles to the St. Louis Cardinals for pitcher Ray King. On February 2, 2007, he signed a minor league deal with the Los Angeles Dodgers. Bigbie exercised a free agent option in his contract on June 1, 2007, and on June 11 signed a minor league contract with the Braves.

During his six-year career, he posted a .268 batting average, hitting 31 home runs and amassing 322 hits in 375 games. Bigbie is an average fielder, but has an above-average arm. He batted .240 in 2006 with the Cardinals, also posting only 1 RBI, in 17 games.

In December 2007, it was announced that he had agreed to a deal to play for the Yokohama Bay Stars of the Nippon Professional Baseball (NPB).

Bigbie made a comeback for the 2010 season, playing for the Edmonton Capitals of the Golden Baseball League. Bigbie was named the DH for Baseball America's 2010 All-Independent Leagues Team.

== Mitchell Report ==
He was named in the Mitchell Report on Steroid Abuse in Baseball on December 13, 2007. According to the report, Bigbie admitted to purchasing and using a variety of performance-enhancing substances from Kirk Radomski from 2001 to 2005, including human growth hormone, Deca-Durabolin, Sustanon, testosterone, and anti-estrogen drugs. Bigbie was introduced to Radomski through former teammate David Segui. Segui reportedly instructed him on "training regimens and the use of creatine, a legal muscle builder, before teaching him about steroids and eventually injecting him with Deca-Durabolin". After he started using steroids, Bigbie gained 30 pounds while maintaining a body fat percentage of 7%.

== See also ==
- List of Major League Baseball players named in the Mitchell Report
