= Paul Byrd =

American baseball player (born 1970)

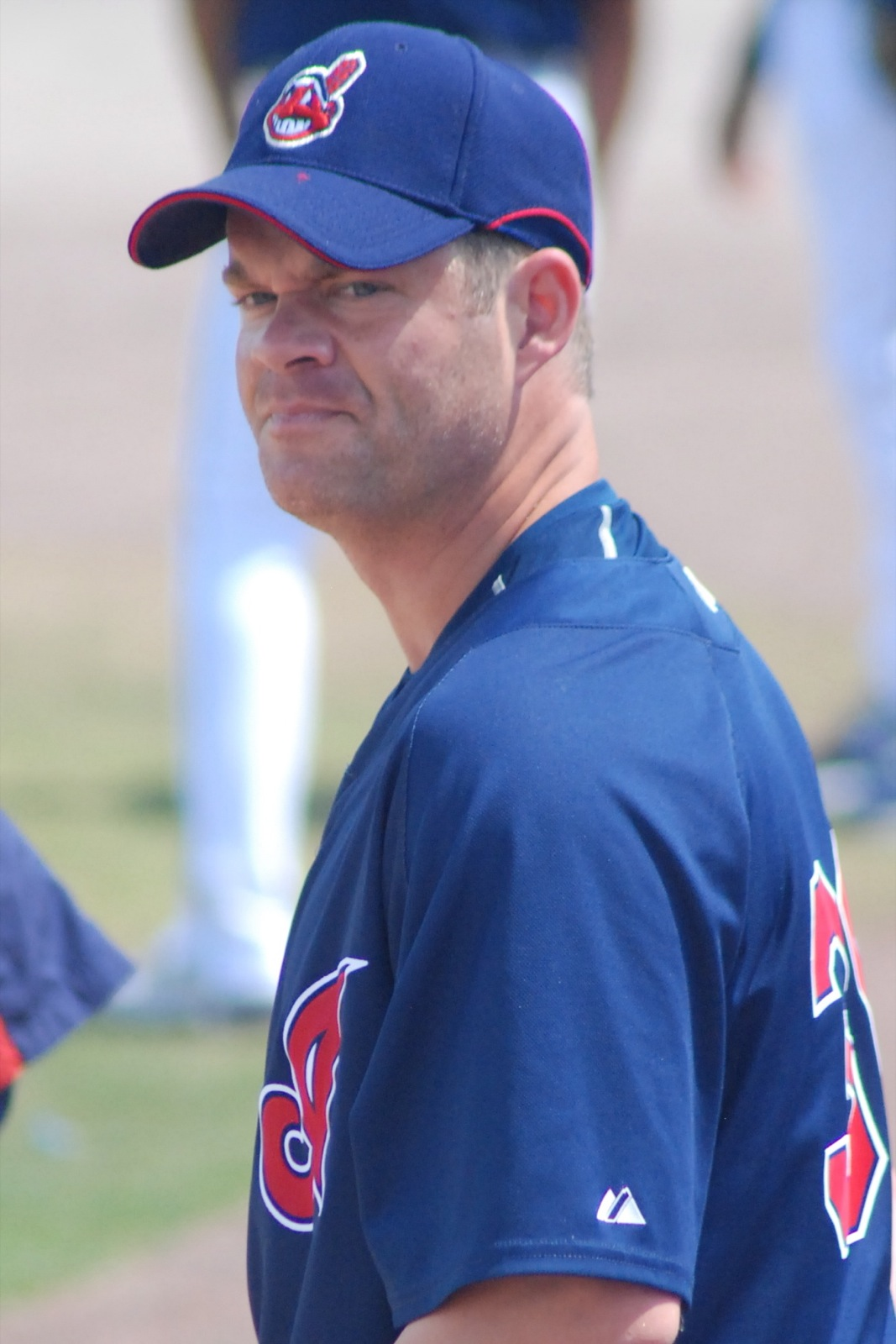
- Byrd with the Cleveland Indians in March 2007
- Pitcher
- Born: December 3, 1970 (age 55); Louisville, Kentucky, U.S.
- Batted: Right Threw: Right

MLB debut
- July 28, 1995, for the New York Mets

Last MLB appearance
- October 1, 2009, for the Boston Red Sox

MLB statistics
- Win–loss record: 109–96
- Earned run average: 4.41
- Strikeouts: 923
- Stats at Baseball Reference

Teams
- New York Mets (1995–1996); Atlanta Braves (1997–1998); Philadelphia Phillies (1998–2001); Kansas City Royals (2001–2002); Atlanta Braves (2004); Los Angeles Angels of Anaheim (2005); Cleveland Indians (2006–2008); Boston Red Sox (2008–2009)

Career highlights and awards
- All-Star (1999)
Medals
Men's baseball
Representing United States
Goodwill Games
Bronze medal – third place	1990 Seattle	Team

Paul Gregory Byrd (born December 3, 1970), is an American former professional baseball starting pitcher, who is currently a TV sports broadcaster for Atlanta Braves games on Bally Sports Southeast. While pitching in Major League Baseball (MLB), from 1995 to 2009, Byrd was known as being the "nicest guy in baseball". Late in his career, he developed an old-fashioned, early twentieth-century windup in which he swung his arms back and forth to create deception and momentum. Byrd became recognizable and well known for his unique delivery.

== High school, college and minor leagues ==
Byrd played his high school career at Saint Xavier High School in Louisville, Kentucky. He was originally drafted by the Cincinnati Reds in the 13th round (332nd overall) of the 1988 Major League Baseball draft, but did not sign and chose to attend college. Byrd attended Louisiana State University where he pitched as part of the Tigers baseball team that won the 1991 College World Series. After the season, he was drafted in the fourth round (112th overall) of the 1991 Major League Baseball draft by the Cleveland Indians. Byrd spent the first four seasons of his career pitching in Cleveland's minor league system, reaching Triple-A in 1994. On November 18, 1994, Byrd was traded to the New York Mets alongside Jerry Dipoto, Dave Mlicki, and a player to be named later (minor leaguer Jesus Azuaje) in exchange for Jeromy Burnitz and Joe Roa.

== Major leagues ==
=== New York Mets ===
Byrd made his major league debut for the Mets on July 28, 1995, allowing two hits and an earned run in 2/3 of an inning in a 10–9 win over the Pittsburgh Pirates. He made 17 relief appearances in his first year with the Mets, going 2–0 with a 2.05 ERA. In 1996, Byrd continued his role in the Mets' bullpen, going 1–2 with a 4.24 ERA in 38 appearances.

=== Atlanta Braves ===
On November 26, 1996, he was traded to the Atlanta Braves along with a player to be named later in exchange for Greg McMichael. Byrd spent most of the 1997 season in the bullpen, but on July 31, he made his first career start against the Florida Marlins. He pitched well, tossing six innings of one-run ball while striking out four, but he was tagged with the loss in a 1–0 defeat. In 31 games (four starts), Byrd went 4–4 with a 5.26 ERA. He spent most of the 1998 season with the Triple-A Richmond Braves, going 5–5 with a 3.69 ERA in 17 starts, and made one appearance with Atlanta (13.50 ERA).

=== Philadelphia Phillies ===
On August 14, 1998, Byrd was claimed off waivers by the Philadelphia Phillies. Three days later on August 17, he made his first start with the Phillies against Randy Johnson and the Houston Astros. In the game, he tossed his first career complete game shutout, allowing just four hits and a walk while striking out six batters in a 4–0 win. In his next start, Byrd tossed another complete game on August 22 against the Colorado Rockies. He allowed one earned run on five hits with four strikeouts in the 6–1 victory. In eight total starts with the Phillies, he finished 5–2 with a 2.29 ERA.

In 1999, Byrd was selected to the All-Star Game for the only time in his career. He finished the season 15–11 with a 4.60 ERA in 32 starts, and led the majors in hit batsmen, with 17. Byrd began the 2000 season poorly, going 1–5 with a 7.86 ERA in his first nine starts. On June 2, he was optioned to the Triple-A Scranton/Wilkes-Barre Red Barons. After making three starts and going 2–0 with a 1.73 ERA with Scranton, Byrd was recalled on June 18 when Andy Ashby was placed on the disabled list. In August, he underwent right shoulder surgery and missed the rest of the season. In 17 games (15 starts), Byrd finished 2–9 with a 6.51 ERA. He returned to the Phillies on May 27, 2001. Byrd appeared in three games (one start) with the team that year, going 0–1 with an 8.10 ERA.

=== Kansas City Royals ===
On June 5, 2001, Byrd was traded to the Kansas City Royals in exchange for pitcher José Santiago. He pitched effectively in the Royals' rotation to close the season, going 6–6 with a 4.05 ERA in 16 games (15 starts). In 2002, despite pitching for a Royals team that lost 100 games, Byrd posted the best season of his career. He finished the season with a 17–11 record, a 3.90 ERA, and an AL-leading seven complete games in 33 starts. After the season, he became a free agent.

=== Atlanta Braves (second stint) ===
Byrd parlayed his successful 2002 season into a two-year, $10 million contract with the Atlanta Braves, which he signed on December 17, 2002. On July 1, 2003, Byrd underwent Tommy John surgery on his right elbow. He was able to successfully come back from the operation in 2004, and finished the season 8–7 with a 3.94 ERA in 19 starts. He also made his first postseason appearance for the Braves during the 2004 National League Division Series, recording the loss in Game 3 after replacing an injured John Thomson in the first inning. In two combined appearances, Byrd was 0–1 with a 6.35 ERA as the Braves ultimately lost to the Houston Astros in five games.

=== Los Angeles Angels of Anaheim ===
On December 14, 2004, the Anaheim Angels signed Byrd to a one-year, $5 million(USD) contract following the trade of right-handed pitcher Ramón Ortiz to the Cincinnati Reds. Byrd made 31 starts in 2005, and finished 12–11 with a 3.74 earned run average in 204 1/3 innings with the Angels. He was tied for second in the American League with 22 quality starts. In the 2005 American League Division Series, Byrd struggled in Game 3 against the New York Yankees, allowing four earned runs on seven hits in 3 2/3 innings pitched, but the Angels managed to win, 11–7. Byrd fared much better in the 2005 American League Championship Series, going 1–0 with a 3.38 ERA in his two starts. However, the Chicago White Sox defeated the Angels in five games.

=== Cleveland Indians ===
On December 4, 2005, Byrd agreed to a two-year, $14.25 million deal with the Cleveland Indians. The deal included a club option for 2008. He made 31 starts in his first season with Cleveland, going 10–9 with a 4.88 ERA.

In 2007, Byrd was 15–8 with a 4.59 ERA and tied for the AL lead with two shutouts in 31 starts. His record was the third-best record on the Indians behind CC Sabathia and Fausto Carmona. On October 8, Byrd was the winning pitcher in a 6–4 win against the New York Yankees, giving the Indians a 3–1 series win in the 2007 American League Division Series. Byrd pitched again on October 16, this time against the Boston Red Sox in the ALCS. He went five innings, giving up two earned runs and striking out four, gaining the victory in an Indians 7–3 win to take a 3–1 lead in the best of seven series. The Red Sox went on to win the next three games to take the series in seven games, eliminating Cleveland from contention. On November 6, Byrd's option for 2008 was exercised, keeping him in Cleveland for another season.

Byrd began the 2008 season with a 7–10 record and a 4.53 ERA in 22 starts with Cleveland.

=== Boston Red Sox ===
On August 12, 2008, Byrd was traded from Cleveland to the Boston Red Sox for a player to be named later (Mickey Hall). He made eight starts with the Red Sox to close out the season, going 4–2 with a 4.78 ERA.

A free agent at the end of the season, Byrd announced on January 14, 2009, that he would sit out the beginning of the 2009 season to spend more time with his family and likely sign a deal with a contending team midseason. Byrd mentioned he would like to sign with a team that is close to his home in Georgia. On August 5, 2009, the Red Sox signed Byrd to a minor-league contract. He made his first major league start of the 2009 season on August 30 against the Toronto Blue Jays, tossing six scoreless innings while giving up three hits and three walks. In seven games (six starts), Byrd was 1–3 with a 5.82 ERA.

=== HGH controversy ===
On October 21, 2007, Byrd was accused of using HGH by the San Francisco Chronicle. The paper accused him of spending $24,850 on HGH and syringes from 2002 to 2005. Byrd defended himself, claiming that he was being treated for a tumor on his pituitary gland, and took the drugs under medical supervision. Subsequent news reports assert that Byrd began taking HGH before any pituitary gland condition was diagnosed and that one of the medical professionals to have prescribed Byrd HGH was a Florida dentist whose dental license had been suspended for fraud and incompetence. Rob Manfred, then MLB senior vice president for business and labor, asserted that Byrd did not have a therapeutic use exemption (TUE) as he claimed.

On December 13, 2007, Byrd was cited in the Mitchell Report on illegal use of performance-enhancing substances in baseball.

== Personal ==
Byrd has written a book called Free Byrd about his life, detailing both his devout Christianity and past struggles with pornography, among other things. Byrd's wife, Kym, is a certified life coach where she helps married athletes with the rigors of their unique marriages. Together, with Paul's help, Kym surveys couples in baseball in hopes of helping those families in need. The couple raised two sons. Through an organization called CRU, Paul and Kym currently travel to various colleges around the United States speaking to students about "Faith in Sports" and "How to Stay Married in a Career Dominated Lifestyle."

== Broadcasting ==
Until 2023, Byrd was a TV sports broadcaster with Bally Sports Southeast covering Atlanta Braves games. He did on-field interviews and provided analytical color commentary in tandem with the Braves' play-by-play announcer Chip Caray and Jeff Francoeur.

Byrd returned to the Braves broadcast team in the 2025 season.

== See also ==
- List of Major League Baseball players named in the Mitchell Report
