= Mike Judd =

American baseball player (born 1975)

- Pitcher
- Born: June 30, 1975 (age 50); San Diego, California, U.S.
- Batted: Right Threw: Right

MLB debut
- September 28, 1997, for the Los Angeles Dodgers

Last MLB appearance
- June 12, 2001, for the Texas Rangers

MLB statistics
- Win–loss record: 4–3
- Earned run average: 7.20
- Strikeouts: 61
- Stats at Baseball Reference

Teams
- Los Angeles Dodgers (1997–2000); Tampa Bay Devil Rays (2001); Texas Rangers (2001)

Michael Galen Judd (born June 30, 1975) is an American former professional baseball right-handed pitcher.

== Career ==
Drafted by the New York Yankees in the 9th round of the 1995 Major League Baseball draft, Judd would make his Major League Baseball debut with the Los Angeles Dodgers on September 28, 1997, and appear in his final game on June 12, 2001.

In December 2007, Judd was included in the Mitchell Report in which it was alleged that he used steroids during his career.

== See also ==
- List of Major League Baseball players named in the Mitchell Report
