= Kirk Radomski =

American professional baseball employee, convicted for job-related illegal activities

- Born: 1969 (age 56–57)
- Other names: Murdock
- Occupations: Batboy, clubhouse employee
- Employer: New York Mets
- Known for: Convicted for money laundering and illegal distribution of controlled substances
- Notable work: Bases Loaded (2009)

Kirk J. Radomski (born 1969) is an American former batboy and clubhouse employee, colloquially known by players as Murdock, for the New York Mets of Major League Baseball from 1985 to 1995. On April 27, 2007, he pleaded guilty in United States district court to money laundering and illegal distribution of anabolic steroids, human growth hormone, Clenbuterol, amphetamines and other drugs to "dozens of current and former Major League Baseball players, and associates, on teams throughout Major League Baseball." Radomski faced a maximum sentence of 25 years in prison and a $500,000 fine. He was sentenced to five years probation and ordered to pay a fine of $18,575, due to his cooperation with the federal government and the Mitchell Report.

== Players' reactions ==
Several former members of the New York Mets were quoted in the April 28, 2007 edition of The New York Times as remembering Radomski. Dave Magadan, former hitting coach for the Boston Red Sox and former Met from 1986–1992, was quoted as saying "He was huge, I mean huge" in reference to Radomski's physical build. Howard Johnson, former hitting coach for the Mets, and former third baseman from 1985–1993 was quoted as saying "He was a clubhouse kid, one of several, one of the kids that were there," when asked about Radomski. Ron Darling, former pitcher for the Mets from 1983–1991, had no recollection of the former team employee.

== Reaction of the New York Mets ==
On April 26, 2007, the New York Mets issued a statement on behalf of the entire organization prior to the start of the team's game with the Washington Nationals at RFK Stadium:

We were surprised and disappointed to learn of the guilty plea today. The conduct in question is diametrically opposed to the values and standards of the Mets organization and our owners. We are and always have been adamantly opposed to the use of performance-enhancing drugs and continue to support Major League Baseball's efforts to eradicate any such use in our game.

=== Reaction of former Mets general manager Steve Phillips ===
Steve Phillips, former general manager of the Mets from 1997–2003, and former analyst for ESPN's Baseball Tonight, wrote an article in reference to Radomski's guilty plea, where he stated:

I was often accused of being in the Mets' clubhouse too much during my years as general manager. I have to admit that I am hoping that there aren't any of my former players outed by this process as it would indicate that not only was I in the clubhouse too much but that I was also deaf and blind.

=== Mitchell Report ===
Radomski was a prominent witness in former United States Senate Majority Leader George J. Mitchell's investigation into the use of performance-enhancing substances in Major League Baseball.

=== Bases Loaded ===
Radomski authored a book in January 2009 titled Bases Loaded – The inside story of the steroid era by the central figure in the Mitchell Report. In this book, he names and describes many of his relationships with Major League Baseball players, his steroid sales, and his interactions with Mitchell and Jeff Novitzki.
