= Mitchell Report =

2007 document about doping in the MLB

The Mitchell Report
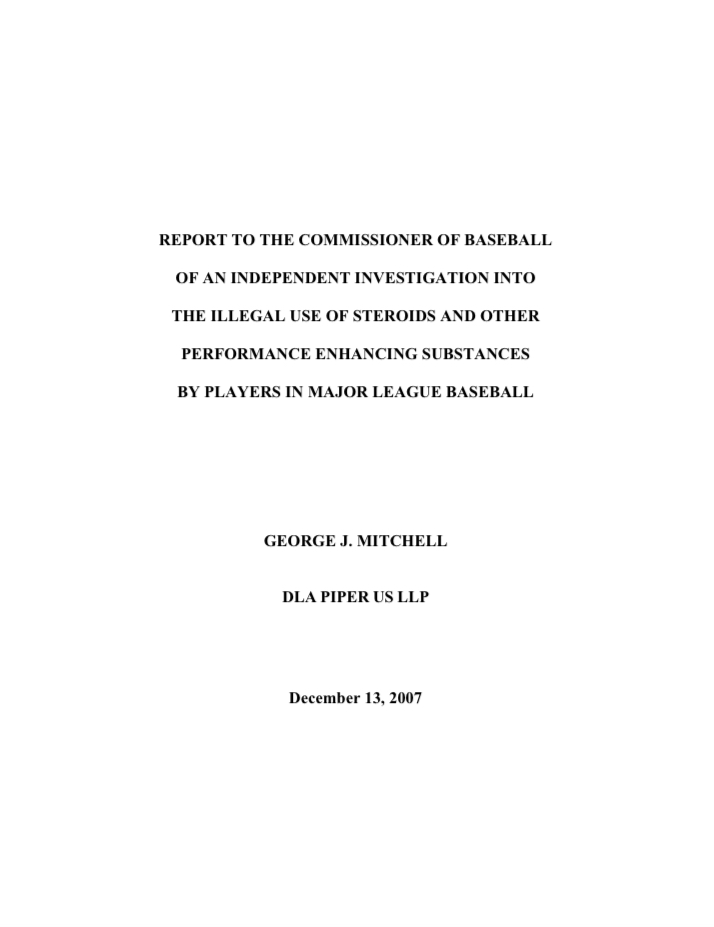
- Author: George J. Mitchell; DLA Piper Law Firm
- Language: English
- Subject: Use of performance-enhancing drugs in Major League Baseball
- Publisher: Office of the Commissioner of Baseball
- Publication date: December 13, 2007
- Publication place: United States
- Media type: Paperback; Internet
- Pages: 409

The Report to the Commissioner of Baseball of an Independent Investigation into the Illegal Use of Steroids and Other Performance Enhancing Substances by Players in Major League Baseball, informally known as the Mitchell Report, is the product of former Democratic United States Senator from Maine George J. Mitchell's 20-month investigation into the use of anabolic steroids and human growth hormone (HGH) in Major League Baseball (MLB). The 409-page report, released on December 13, 2007, covers the history of the use of illegal performance-enhancing substances by players and the effectiveness of the MLB Joint Drug Prevention and Treatment Program. The report includes recommendations about the handling of past illegal drug use and future prevention practices. The report names 89 MLB players alleged to have used steroids or other performance-enhancing drugs.

== Background ==
A former Senate majority leader, federal prosecutor, and ex-chairman of the Walt Disney Company, George Mitchell was appointed by Commissioner of Baseball Bud Selig on March 30, 2006 to investigate the use of performance-enhancing drugs in MLB. Mitchell was appointed during a time of controversy over the 2006 book Game of Shadows by San Francisco Chronicle investigative reporters Lance Williams and Mark Fainaru-Wada, which chronicles alleged extensive use of performance enhancers, including several different types of steroids and growth hormone by baseball superstars Barry Bonds, Gary Sheffield and Jason Giambi. The appointment was made after several influential members of the U.S. Congress made negative comments about the effectiveness and honesty of MLB's drug policies.

== Investigation ==
Mitchell's investigation focused on high-profile players, without investigating the role teams played. Mitchell reported that the Major League Baseball Players Association was "largely uncooperative". According to Mitchell, the Players Association effectively discouraged players from cooperating with the investigation. In a memorandum to players, the Association advised:

...while Senator Mitchell pledges in his memo that he will honor any player request for confidentiality in his report, he does not pledge, because he cannot pledge, that any information you provide will actually remain confidential and not be disclosed without your consent. For example, Senator Mitchell cannot promise that information you disclose will not be given to a federal or state prosecutor, a Congressional committee, or perhaps turned over in a private lawsuit in response to a request or a subpoena.

Confidentiality was not an idle concern. The Players Association had agreed to anonymous testing in 2003, only to find out the list of players testing positive was turned over to the government (as part of the Bay Area Laboratory Co-operative investigation).

Mitchell agreed to give Commissioner Selig an advanced copy of the report while refusing to do the same for the Players Association.

Only two active players were interviewed for the report. Of five players who were approached by the investigators for interviews because of their public statements on the issue, Toronto Blue Jays designated hitter Frank Thomas was the only one willing to be interviewed.

=== Kirk Radomski ===
Kirk Radomski, a former batboy and clubhouse employee for the New York Mets and a critical witness, provided most of the names that the general public did not know about. Mitchell was able to secure Radomski's cooperation through San Francisco, California, U.S. Attorney Scott Schools. Radomski had been charged with distribution of a controlled substance and money laundering and faced up to thirty years in prison. He reached a plea bargain that was conditioned upon his cooperation with the Mitchell investigation. Radomski pled guilty to those charges, received a sentence of five years’ probation, and was fined $18,575.

=== Brian McNamee ===
Brian McNamee is a personal trainer who was most notably employed by Andy Pettitte, Roger Clemens, and Chuck Knoblauch. He is a former strength coach for the New York Yankees and Toronto Blue Jays. The Mitchell Report alleges that McNamee helped acquire performance-enhancing drugs including steroids, amphetamines, and human growth hormone for some or all of the players he personally trained. McNamee told the Mitchell Commission that he began injecting Clemens with steroids in 1998 and that he continued to provide these steroids through 2001.

=== Larry Starr ===
Larry Starr was a trainer for 30 years with the Cincinnati Reds (1972–1992) and the Florida Marlins (1993–2002). Starr was interviewed by Mitchell's investigators at least four times, but his information was entirely omitted from the final Report.

Starr has spoken freely about the subject with the press. He told a reporter,

I have notes from the Winter Meetings where the owners group and the players' association sat in meetings with the team physicians and team trainers. I was there. And team physicians stood up and said, "Look, we need to do something about this. We've got a problem here if we don't do something about it." That was in 1988.

In another interview, Starr said,

I don't totally blame the players. They didn't abuse the system. They used the system. The system was such that there was no testing so... the bad thing was it really put the medical people in a bad situation. If we couldn't test, there was no way we could accuse somebody point blank that they were using some type of performance-enhancing substance... Here's the position I took. If I can't test, if I can't do anything objective with them, what I told my players was come on in [the training room]. If you've got any questions, we'll close the door, close the blinds, there will be no papers, no pencils and what do you want to know. And I'd tell them everything I knew... When Mark McGwire was discovered taking androstenedione, when that hit ESPN, four players walked into my office within an hour and asked, "Where can I get androstenedione?"

Starr says that the first player he knew to be using steroids was doing so in 1984, and that multiple members of the championship 1997 Marlins team used steroids. In 2000, Starr found a bag of syringes belonging to Marlins pitcher Ricky Bones and reported it to his superiors, who sent the information up the chain to the commissioner's office. No action was taken; this incident was not included in the Mitchell Report.

Starr told a reporter, "Someone ought to ask Mr. Selig whether he had any suspicion at all. Was there any one time from 1990 to 2003 that you had any suspicion that people were doing something wrong or cheating? If he says no to that question, he must not have watched many games." Referring back to the 1980s, he told another reporter, "You'd have to live in Siberia to not know it was going on."

On the eve of the Mitchell report's release, Starr told the New York Daily News "From the conversations I had with them, I got the feeling they were very open to what I had to say. They were not just after names. I really felt like they wanted to hear the background on all this. I didn't feel like I was wasting my time." Neither Starr's information indicting MLB's decades of knowledge nor Starr's name appear anywhere in the Mitchell Report.

== Report findings ==
The report describes motivations for its preparation, including health effects of steroids, legal issues, fair play, and reports that baseball players acted as role models for child athletes. For example, after the news broke in August 1998 that Mark McGwire had used androstenedione, a steroid precursor whose use was legal at the time, sales of the supplement increased more than tenfold; in 2001, the National Institute on Drug Abuse reported that 8% of male high school senior athletes had used androstenedione.

Mitchell reported that during the random testing in 2003, 5 to 7 percent of players tested positive for steroid use. Players on the forty-man roster of major league teams were exempt from testing until 2004. One player is quoted: "Forty-man [roster] guys already have all of the [major league] club advantages, and then they could use steroids...it was not a level playing field."

According to the report, after mandatory random testing began in 2004, HGH became the substance of choice among players, as it was not then detectable in tests.

The report noted that at least one player from each of the thirty Major League Baseball teams was involved in the alleged violations.

=== Players listed ===
In all, 89 former and current MLB players are named in the report, including well-known players such as Roger Clemens, Andy Pettitte, Miguel Tejada, and Éric Gagné. Many of them are connected through a relatively small social network centering on Kirk Radomski.

=== Recommendations ===
1. Major League Baseball should use an independent testing administrator to improve their capability to investigate the use of performance-enhancing drugs, above and beyond the current urine testing program. Additionally, Major League Baseball should improve their methods of barring the drugs from the clubhouse.
2. Major League Baseball should improve their efforts to educate the players and others regarding the grim health dangers that result from this drug use.
3. When the club owners and the Players Association take up negotiations regarding the league's drug program again, they should be guided by modern and first-rate standards.

=== Conclusions ===
Mitchell expressed his hope that readers of the report would look past the players' names that are included in the report and focus on the conclusions he reached during his investigation.

Mitchell presents his conclusions in five sections.

1. Major League Baseball's 2002 response to steroid use resulted in players switching from detectable steroids to undetectable human growth hormone.
2. The use of performance-enhancing substances by players is illegal and ethically "wrong".
3. While players that use illegal substances are responsible for their actions, that responsibility is shared by the entire baseball community for failing to recognize the problem sooner.
4. An exhaustive investigation attempting to identify every player that has used illegal substances would not be beneficial.
5. Major League Baseball should adopt the recommendations of the report as a first step in eliminating the use of illegal substances.

== Reactions ==
The release of the Mitchell Report is reported on the front page of The Baltimore Sun the day after its release.

After the report was released, Selig held a news conference in which he called the Mitchell Report "a call to action. And I will act." Selig indicated that it is possible that some of the players named in the report may face disciplinary actions. "Discipline of players and others identified in this report will be determined on a case-by-case basis. If warranted, those decisions will be made swiftly," said Selig.

Donald Fehr, executive director of the MLB Players Association, also held a news conference where he expressed his disappointment that the union was not given a chance to read the report beforehand. He accepted some responsibility for the steroid problems but expressed concern about how the league would treat the players named in the report.

Roger Clemens has been deemed the list's standout name. The seven-time Cy Young Award winner issued a response through agent Randy Hendricks, saying "I want to state clearly and without qualification: I did not take steroids, human growth hormone or any other banned substances at any time in my baseball career or, in fact, my entire life."

The day after the report was released, then-President of the United States George W. Bush, a former co-owner of the Texas Rangers, said, "We can jump to this conclusion: that steroids have sullied the game." He said he had no prior knowledge or awareness of player steroid use. He added, "My hope is that this report is a part of putting the steroid era of baseball behind us."

Strangely enough, the Mitchell Report disappeared from both MLB and Baseball Reference, as Swing Completo LLC noted in their reference to the report.

== Drug testing after the report ==
Major League Baseball's drug testing policy became more strict after the Mitchell Report came out, allegedly in hopes of stopping steroid use in professional baseball.

Before the Mitchell Report came out, MLB had one unannounced mandatory test each year for every player and random tests for selective players during the season and the off-season. Each drug test examined each player for steroids, steroid precursors, and designer steroids. If caught, suspensions without pay occurred. The first positive tests resulted in a suspension for ten days, the second for thirty days, the third for sixty days and the fourth positive test resulted in a one-year suspension.

After George Mitchell's report came out, MLB markedly increased testing and punishments. Now baseball tests unannounced twice a year for all players and random testing still occurs for selected players. MLB also tests for more substances. As of 2015, the MLB's Joint Drug Prevention and Treatment Program tests for eight different abusive drugs, 74 performance-enhancing drugs, and 56 stimulants. One of the 74 performance-enhancing drugs is Human Growth Hormone (HGH), a substance that was never tested for before the Mitchell Report because no reliable test existed. Along with the increase of substances tested for came an increase in suspensions without pay. The first positive test now results in an eighty-game suspension, the second is 162 games (a full season), and the third positive results in a lifetime suspension from MLB.

== Conflict of interest allegations ==
Some questioned whether being a director of the Boston Red Sox created a conflict of interest for Mitchell, especially because no prime Red Sox players were named in the report, despite the fact that Red Sox stars David Ortiz and Manny Ramirez were later alleged to have used performance-enhancing substances during the 2003 season, as reported by The New York Times on July 30, 2009. Likewise, the report was commissioned by Selig, and no members of the Milwaukee Brewers, whom Selig once owned, appeared in the report.

The report was leaked to the San Francisco Chronicle shortly prior to the deciding game seven of the 2007 American League Championship Series between the Cleveland Indians and the Boston Red Sox, although it was not officially released until December, months after the series was over. This was cause for some players and media members to note the curious timing of the leak. In particular, Indians pitcher Paul Byrd, along with some of his teammates, felt that the timing of publicizing Byrd's alleged steroid use was suspicious.

Former U.S. prosecutor John M. Dowd also brought up allegations of Mitchell's conflict of interest. Dowd, who had defended Senator John McCain of Arizona during the Keating Five investigation in the late 1980s, cited how he took exception to Mitchell's scolding of McCain and others for having a conflict of interest with their actions in the case and how the baseball investigation would be a "burden" for him when Mitchell was named to lead it. However, after the investigation, Dowd later told the Baltimore Sun that he was convinced the former Senator had done a good job.

The Los Angeles Times reported that Mitchell acknowledged that his "tight relationship with Major League Baseball left him open to criticism". Mitchell responded to the concerns by stating that readers who examined the report closely "will not find any evidence of bias, of special treatment of the Red Sox".

== See also ==
- Banned substances in baseball
- Doping in the United States
- List of Major League Baseball players named in the Mitchell Report
- List of Major League Baseball players suspended for performance-enhancing drugs
