= 1993 Philadelphia Phillies season =

Major League Baseball season

1993 Philadelphia Phillies
- National League champions National League East champions
- League: National League
- Division: East
- Ballpark: Veterans Stadium
- City: Philadelphia
- Record: 97–65 (.599)
- Divisional place: 1st
- Owners: Bill Giles
- General managers: Lee Thomas
- Managers: Jim Fregosi
- Television: WPHL-TV (Andy Musser, Harry Kalas, Richie Ashburn); PRISM (Chris Wheeler, Jay Johnstone, Garry Maddox); SportsChannel Philadelphia (Andy Musser, Kent Tekulve)
- Radio: WOGL (Harry Kalas, Richie Ashburn, Andy Musser, Chris Wheeler, Garry Maddox)

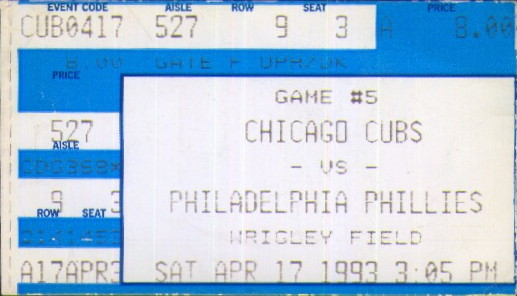
A ticket for a 1993 game between the Philadelphia Phillies and the Chicago Cubs.

The 1993 Philadelphia Phillies season was the 111th season in the history of the franchise. The team won the National League East title and defeated the Atlanta Braves in the NLCS in six games, before losing the World Series to the Toronto Blue Jays, also in six games.

== Regular season ==
After finishing in last place the previous year, the Phillies took the lead in the National League East Division on opening day and remained in first for all but one day (April 9) the rest of the season, clinching the division title on September 28 in Pittsburgh.

The 1993 Phillies were led by stars Dave Hollins, Darren Daulton, John Kruk, Lenny Dykstra, Mitch Williams and Curt Schilling. The team was often described as "shaggy", "unkempt", and "dirty." The previous year, noting the presence of the clean-cut Dale Murphy, Kruk described his team as "24 morons and one Mormon." Their character endeared them to fans, and attendance reached a record high the following season. As a play on the legendary 1927 New York Yankees' Murderers' Row, the team's scruffy, mullet-wearing look was dubbed "Macho Row." To the surprise of their city and the nation, the Phillies powered their way to a 97–65 record and an NL East Division title. Their 97 wins were the most since their back-to-back 101-win seasons in 1976 and 1977.

They had a formidable batting lineup, leading the National League in at-bats (5,685), runs scored (877), hits (1,555), doubles (297), walks (665), on-base percentage (.351), and total bases (2,422). Center fielder Lenny Dykstra batted .305 and led the league in hits, with 194, and runs scored, with 143, both career-highs; he also set career-highs in home runs (19) and RBI (66). Left fielder Pete Incaviglia hit 24 home runs and drove in 89 runs in only 368 at-bats. Catcher Darren Daulton also hit 24 home runs and drove in 105 runs, topping 100 for the second consecutive season. Steady-hitting right fielder Jim Eisenreich contributed with a .318 batting average and struck out only 36 times in 362 at-bats. First baseman John Kruk batted .316 and hit 14 home runs with 85 RBI, while third baseman Dave Hollins drove in 93 runs for the second straight season.

The Phillies also had one of the best pitching staffs in the Major Leagues that year, leading their league in complete games (24), innings pitched (1,472.2) and strikeouts (1,117). Each of their five starting pitchers had at least one shutout during the regular season. Curt Schilling and Tommy Greene each won 16 games, Ben Rivera won 13, and Danny Jackson and Terry Mulholland won 12. Closer Mitch Williams walked 44 batters in 62.0 innings, but had a solid 3.34 ERA with 43 saves and averaged only one home run allowed every 20.2 innings pitched.

During the season there were a multitude of memorable moments. In late April, the team rallied from an 8–0 deficit to defeat the San Francisco Giants 9–8 in 10 innings, spurred when Giants reliever Bryan Hickerson slammed the ball to the ground to celebrate an out. In San Diego, a few days later, left-fielder Milt Thompson saved a game by making a leaping catch on a potential grand slam by the Padres' catcher Bob Geren.

Terry Mulholland hurled the first shutout in Mile High Stadium, as the Phils swept the expansion Colorado Rockies in late May. On July 2, the Phils and Padres played a doubleheader that lasted almost 12 hours with rain delays; Mitch Williams won the second game with an RBI single at 4:41 AM. Five days later, Lenny Dykstra ended a 7–6, 20-inning game against the Dodgers at Veterans Stadium with a ground-rule double.

The Phillies survived a 6–14 skid from late June through mid-July that shrunk their lead in the East to three games on July 17. A three-game sweep of the St. Louis Cardinals to end July effectively pushed the Redbirds out of the pennant chase, and Danny Jackson's 12–0 rout of Cincinnati on August 29 left the Cards 10 games out and the Expos 10 1/2 out with one month to go.

However, another slip in September caused some columnists in the city to compare the club to the infamous 1964 team. They lost five of seven games at home to the Cubs and Astros, then lost two of three at Olympic Stadium, which brought Montreal within four games with 13 remaining.

All that was laid to rest on September 28, when the Phils clinched the NL East with a 10–7 win over in-state rival Pittsburgh at Three Rivers Stadium. Mariano Duncan hit a grand slam to lead a comeback, and little-used Donn Pall closed out the game, touching off a wild celebration for their first division crown since 1983. Outfielder Wes Chamberlain ended all the references to 1964, screaming, "It's 1993, baby! It ain't 1964. Where are those ghosts now?". Here is Phillies announcer Harry Kalas's call of the final out of the Division-clinching game against Pittsburgh:

Ground ball, it's a fair ball! Kruk to Pall ... the Phillies are the '93 National League Eastern Division Champions! This wonderful band of throwback players have won the National League East, mobbing one another on the field.

The hit song "Whoomp! (There It Is)" became the unofficial team theme song throughout the season and postseason.

This would be the Phillies only winning season of the 1990s as the team would fall back into mediocrity and would not have another winning record until 2001.

=== Season standings ===
NL East
Team	W	L	Pct.	GB	Home	Road
Philadelphia Phillies	97	65	.599	—	52‍–‍29	45‍–‍36
Montreal Expos	94	68	.580	3	55‍–‍26	39‍–‍42
St. Louis Cardinals	87	75	.537	10	49‍–‍32	38‍–‍43
Chicago Cubs	84	78	.519	13	43‍–‍38	41‍–‍40
Pittsburgh Pirates	75	87	.463	22	40‍–‍41	35‍–‍46
Florida Marlins	64	98	.395	33	35‍–‍46	29‍–‍52
New York Mets	59	103	.364	38	28‍–‍53	31‍–‍50

=== Record vs. opponents ===
1993 National League record Source: MLB Standings Grid – 1993
Team	ATL	CHC	CIN	COL	FLA	HOU	LAD	MON	NYM	PHI	PIT	SD	SF	STL
Atlanta	—	7–5	10–3	13–0	7–5	8–5	8–5	7–5	9–3	6–6	7–5	9–4	7–6	6–6
Chicago	5–7	—	7–5	8–4	6–7	4–8	7–5	5–8–1	8–5	7–6	5–8	8–4	6–6	8–5
Cincinnati	3–10	5–7	—	9–4	7–5	6–7	5–8	4–8	6–6	4–8	8–4	9–4	2–11	5–7
Colorado	0–13	4–8	4–9	—	7–5	11–2	7–6	3–9	6–6	3–9	8–4	6–7	3–10	5–7
Florida	5–7	7–6	5–7	5–7	—	3–9	5–7	5–8	4–9	4–9	6–7	7–5	4–8	4–9
Houston	5–8	8–4	7–6	2–11	9–3	—	9–4	5–7	11–1	5–7	7–5	8–5	3–10	6–6
Los Angeles	5–8	5–7	8–5	6–7	7–5	4–9	—	6–6	8–4	2–10	8–4	9–4	7–6	6–6
Montreal	5–7	8–5–1	8–4	9–3	8–5	7–5	6–6	—	9–4	6–7	8–5	10–2	3–9	7–6
New York	3–9	5–8	6–6	6–6	9–4	1–11	4–8	4–9	—	3–10	4–9	5–7	4–8	5–8
Philadelphia	6-6	6–7	8–4	9–3	9–4	7–5	10–2	7–6	10–3	—	7–6	6–6	4–8	8–5
Pittsburgh	5–7	8–5	4–8	4–8	7–6	5–7	4–8	5–8	9–4	6–7	—	9–3	5–7	4–9
San Diego	4–9	4–8	4–9	7–6	5–7	5–8	4–9	2–10	7–5	6–6	3–9	—	3–10	7–5
San Francisco	6–7	6–6	11–2	10–3	8–4	10–3	6–7	9–3	8–4	8–4	7–5	10–3	—	4–8
St. Louis	6–6	5–8	7–5	7–5	9–4	6–6	6–6	6–7	8–5	5–8	9–4	5–7	8–4	—

=== Notable transactions ===
- April 13, 1993: Brad Hassinger (minors) was traded by the Phillies to the Atlanta Braves for Mark Davis.
- June 1, 1993: Juan Bell was selected off waivers from the Phillies by the Milwaukee Brewers.
- June 3, 1993: 1993 Major League Baseball draft
  - Wayne Gomes was drafted by the Phillies in the 1st round (4th pick). Player signed July 27, 1993.
  - Scott Rolen was drafted by the Phillies in the 2nd round. Player signed July 22, 1993.
- July 2, 1993: Mark Davis was released by the Phillies.
- July 3, 1993: Tim Mauser was traded by the Phillies to the San Diego Padres for Roger Mason.
- August 10, 1993: José DeLeón was traded by the Phillies to the Chicago White Sox for Bobby Thigpen.

=== Game log ===
1993 game log (Overall Record: 97–65)
April (17–5)

#	Date	Opponent	Score	Win	Loss	Save	Attendance	Record
1	April 5	@ Astros	3–1	**Terry Mulholland** (1–0)	Doug Drabek (0–1)	None	44,560	1–0
2	April 6	@ Astros	5–3	**Curt Schilling** (1–0)	Greg Swindell (0–1)	**Mitch Williams** (1)	18,686	2–0
3	April 7	@ Astros	6–3 (10)	**José DeLeón** (1–0)	Eric Bell (0–1)	**Mitch Williams** (2)	16,471	3–0
4	April 9	Cubs	7–11	Chuck McElroy (1–0)	**Ben Rivera** (0–1)	Randy Myers (1)	60,985	3–1
5	April 10	Cubs	5–4	**Terry Mulholland** (2–0)	Mike Morgan (0–2)	**Mitch Williams** (3)	21,081	4–1
6	April 11	Cubs	3–0	**Curt Schilling** (2–0)	José Guzmán (1–1)	None	21,955	5–1
7	April 12	Reds	5–4	**José DeLeón** (2–0)	Steve Foster (0–2)	**Mitch Williams** (4)	20,107	6–1
8	April 13	Reds	4–1	**Tommy Greene** (1–0)	Tim Belcher (0–1)	**Mitch Williams** (5)	20,482	7–1
9	April 14	Reds	9–2	**Ben Rivera** (1–1)	Tom Browning (0–2)	None	21,111	8–1
10	April 16	@ Cubs	1–3	Mike Morgan (1–2)	**Terry Mulholland** (2–1)	Randy Myers (2)	16,255	8–2
11	April 17	@ Cubs	3–6	José Guzmán (2–1)	**Curt Schilling** (2–1)	Randy Myers (3)	32,680	8–3
12	April 18	@ Cubs	11–10 (11)	**Mitch Williams** (1–0)	Bob Scanlan (0–2)	**David West** (1)	28,758	9–3
13	April 20	Padres	4–3 (14)	**Bob Ayrault** (1–0)	Jeremy Hernandez (0–2)	None	21,074	10–3
–	April 21	Padres	Postponed (rain); Makeup: July 2 as a traditional double-header					
14	April 22	Padres	1–2	Andy Benes (3–1)	**Terry Mulholland** (2–2)	Rich Rodriguez (2)	15,826	10–4
15	April 23	Dodgers	2–0	**Curt Schilling** (3–1)	Ramón Martínez (2–2)	None	21,702	11–4
16	April 24	Dodgers	7–3	**Danny Jackson** (1–0)	Kevin Gross (2–2)	**Mitch Williams** (6)	37,457	12–4
17	April 25	Dodgers	5–2	**Tommy Greene** (2–0)	Tom Candiotti (0–3)	**Mitch Williams** (7)	53,030	13–4
18	April 26	Giants	9–8 (10)	**Larry Andersen** (1–0)	Gino Minutelli (0–1)	None	17,170	14–4
19	April 27	Giants	3–6	John Burkett (5–0)	**Terry Mulholland** (2–3)	Rod Beck (7)	34,005	14–5
20	April 28	@ Padres	5–3	**Curt Schilling** (4–1)	Greg W. Harris (1–4)	**Mitch Williams** (8)	10,905	15–5
21	April 29	@ Padres	5–3	**Danny Jackson** (2–0)	Frank Seminara (1–2)	**Mitch Williams** (9)	14,399	16–5
22	April 30	@ Dodgers	7–6	**Bob Ayrault** (2–0)	Omar Daal (0–1)	**Mitch Williams** (10)	43,679	17–5

May (17–10)

#	Date	Opponent	Score	Win	Loss	Save	Attendance	Record
23	May 1	@ Dodgers	1–5	Tom Candiotti (1–3)	**Ben Rivera** (1–2)	None	44,023	17–6
24	May 2	@ Dodgers	9–1	**Terry Mulholland** (3–3)	Orel Hershiser (3–3)	None	41,102	18–6
25	May 4	@ Giants	4–3 (12)	**Larry Andersen** (2–0)	Dave Righetti (1–1)	**Mitch Williams** (11)	17,725	19–6
26	May 5	@ Giants	2–11	Bill Swift (3–1)	**Danny Jackson** (2–1)	None	20,289	19–7
27	May 7	Cardinals	4–3	**Tommy Greene** (3–0)	Joe Magrane (2–3)	**Mitch Williams** (12)	33,739	20–7
28	May 8	Cardinals	2–1 (10)	**Terry Mulholland** (4–3)	Mike Pérez (2–2)	None	40,524	21–7
29	May 9	Cardinals	6–5	**Mark Davis** (1–0)	Lee Smith (0–1)	**Mitch Williams** (13)	43,648	22–7
30	May 10	Pirates	5–1	**Danny Jackson** (3–1)	Bob Walk (3–3)	None	29,712	23–7
31	May 11	Pirates	4–8	Paul Wagner (1–0)	**Mark Davis** (1–1)	None	32,871	23–8
32	May 12	Pirates	4–1	**Tommy Greene** (4–0)	Randy Tomlin (1–4)	None	24,906	24–8
33	May 14	@ Braves	7–10	Tom Glavine (5–0)	**Terry Mulholland** (4–4)	Mike Stanton (14)	48,449	24–9
34	May 15	@ Braves	3–5	Greg Maddux (3–3)	**David West** (0–1)	Mike Stanton (15)	48,425	24–10
35	May 16	@ Braves	5–4	**Danny Jackson** (4–1)	Greg McMichael (1–2)	**Mitch Williams** (14)	48,890	25–10
36	May 17	@ Marlins	10–3	**Ben Rivera** (2–2)	Charlie Hough (2–4)	None	38,519	26–10
37	May 18	@ Marlins	6–0	**Tommy Greene** (5–0)	Jack Armstrong (3–4)	None	35,805	27–10
38	May 19	@ Marlins	3–5	Richie Lewis (2–0)	**Mark Davis** (1–2)	Bryan Harvey (12)	33,970	27–11
39	May 20	Expos	9–3	**Curt Schilling** (5–1)	Chris Nabholz (3–4)	None	28,103	28–11
40	May 21	Expos	2–6	Ken Hill (5–0)	**Danny Jackson** (4–2)	Mel Rojas (6)	41,146	28–12
41	May 22	Expos	5–6	Jeff Fassero (3–1)	**Mitch Williams** (1–1)	John Wetteland (6)	37,911	28–13
42	May 23	Expos	14–7	**Terry Mulholland** (5–4)	Gil Heredia (1–1)	**David West** (2)	52,911	29–13
43	May 24	Mets	6–3	**Tommy Greene** (6–0)	Frank Tanana (2–3)	None	32,568	30–13
44	May 25	Mets	4–2	**Curt Schilling** (6–1)	Pete Schourek (2–5)	None	34,578	31–13
45	May 26	Mets	4–5	John Franco (2–0)	**Mitch Williams** (1–2)	Jeff Innis (1)	33,367	31–14
46	May 28	@ Rockies	15–9	**Ben Rivera** (3–2)	Butch Henry (2–6)	None	58,312	32–14
47	May 29	@ Rockies	6–0	**Terry Mulholland** (6–4)	Willie Blair (1–2)	None	56,263	33–14
48	May 30	@ Rockies	18–1	**Tommy Greene** (7–0)	Lance Painter (0–2)	None	56,710	34–14
49	May 31	@ Reds	4–6	Jeff Reardon (1–0)	**Larry Andersen** (2–1)	Rob Dibble (4)	25,676	34–15

June (18–10)

#	Date	Opponent	Score	Win	Loss	Save	Attendance	Record
50	June 1	@ Reds	6–3	**Larry Andersen** (3–1)	Greg Cadaret (1–1)	**Mitch Williams** (15)	24,175	35–15
51	June 2	@ Reds	5–2	**Ben Rivera** (4–2)	John Smiley (2–7)	**Mitch Williams** (16)	25,904	36–15
52	June 4	Rockies	1–2	Willie Blair (2–2)	**Terry Mulholland** (6–5)	Gary Wayne (1)	43,333	36–16
53	June 5	Rockies	6–2	**Tommy Greene** (8–0)	Armando Reynoso (3–3)	None	43,837	37–16
54	June 6	Rockies	11–7	**Curt Schilling** (7–1)	Andy Ashby (0–4)	None	55,714	38–16
55	June 7	Astros	7–5	**Danny Jackson** (5–2)	Greg Swindell (5–5)	**Mitch Williams** (17)	26,445	39–16
56	June 8	Astros	3–6	Darryl Kile (5–1)	**Ben Rivera** (4–3)	Doug Jones (13)	24,669	39–17
57	June 9	Astros	8–0	**Terry Mulholland** (7–5)	Pete Harnisch (6–3)	None	25,389	40–17
58	June 10	@ Mets	7–6	**David West** (1–1)	Paul Gibson (1–1)	**Mitch Williams** (18)	22,377	41–17
59	June 11	@ Mets	5–2	**Curt Schilling** (8–1)	Pete Schourek (2–8)	None	29,594	42–17
60	June 12	@ Mets	3–0	**Danny Jackson** (6–2)	Dwight Gooden (7–5)	None	31,814	43–17
61	June 13	@ Mets	5–3	**Ben Rivera** (5–3)	Anthony Young (0–7)	**Mitch Williams** (19)	29,917	44–17
62	June 14	@ Expos	10–3	**Terry Mulholland** (8–5)	Jeff Shaw (1–3)	None	13,235	45–17
63	June 15	@ Expos	4–8	Brian Barnes (2–1)	**Tommy Greene** (8–1)	None	13,142	45–18
64	June 16	@ Expos	3–4 (10)	Mel Rojas (2–5)	**David West** (1–2)	None	14,231	45–19
65	June 17	Marlins	1–4	Chris Hammond (7–4)	**Danny Jackson** (6–3)	Bryan Harvey (20)	38,855	45–20
66	June 18	Marlins	7–3	**Ben Rivera** (6–3)	Ryan Bowen (4–7)	None	37,925	46–20
67	June 19	Marlins	5–2	**Terry Mulholland** (9–5)	Jack Armstrong (4–8)	**Mitch Williams** (20)	50,391	47–20
68	June 20	Marlins	4–3	**Tommy Greene** (9–1)	Trevor Hoffman (2–2)	**Mitch Williams** (21)	58,508	48–20
69	June 21	Braves	1–8	Greg Maddux (7–5)	**Curt Schilling** (8–2)	None	34,817	48–21
70	June 22	Braves	5–3	**Danny Jackson** (7–3)	Pete Smith (2–7)	**Mitch Williams** (22)	41,557	49–21
71	June 23	Braves	8–3	**Ben Rivera** (7–3)	John Smoltz (6–7)	None	57,903	50–21
72	June 25	@ Pirates	8–6	**José DeLeón** (3–0)	John Candelaria (0–3)	**Mitch Williams** (23)	21,173	51–21
73	June 26	@ Pirates	2–4	Steve Cooke (5–3)	**Curt Schilling** (8–3)	None	39,439	51–22
74	June 27	@ Pirates	3–4 (10)	Stan Belinda (3–0)	**Mitch Williams** (1–3)	None	27,824	51–23
75	June 28	@ Cardinals	1–3	Rhéal Cormier (5–4)	**Danny Jackson** (7–4)	Lee Smith (29)	29,199	51–24
76	June 29	@ Cardinals	13–10	**Ben Rivera** (8–3)	Tom Urbani (0–1)	None	39,344	52–24
77	June 30	@ Cardinals	3–9	Donovan Osborne (6–3)	**Tommy Greene** (9–2)	None	32,098	52–25

July (14–14)

#	Date	Opponent	Score	Win	Loss	Save	Attendance	Record
78	July 1	@ Cardinals	5–14	Bob Tewksbury (9–6)	**Curt Schilling** (8–4)	None	39,610	52–26
79	July 2 (1)	Padres	2–5	Mark Ettles (1–0)	**Terry Mulholland** (9–6)	Gene Harris (13)	see 2nd game	52–27
80	July 2 (2)	Padres	6–5 (10)	**Mitch Williams** (2–3)	Trevor Hoffman (2–3)	None	54,617	53–27
81	July 3	Padres	4–6	Greg W. Harris (8–8)	**Danny Jackson** (7–5)	Gene Harris (14)	57,521	53–28
82	July 4	Padres	8–4	**Ben Rivera** (9–3)	Tim Worrell (0–2)	None	33,379	54–28
83	July 5	Dodgers	9–5	**Tommy Greene** (10–2)	Orel Hershiser (6–8)	None	33,088	55–28
84	July 6	Dodgers	5–7	Pedro Astacio (7–4)	**Curt Schilling** (8–5)	Jim Gott (15)	32,993	55–29
85	July 7	Dodgers	7–6 (20)	**Mike Williams** (1–0)	Ricky Trlicek (0–2)	None	41,730	56–29
86	July 8	Giants	2–13	Bill Swift (11–5)	**Danny Jackson** (7–6)	None	37,745	56–30
87	July 9	Giants	8–15	Bud Black (8–1)	**Ben Rivera** (9–4)	None	38,695	56–31
88	July 10	Giants	8–3	**Tommy Greene** (11–2)	John Burkett (13–3)	None	41,869	57–31
89	July 11	Giants	2–10	Bryan Hickerson (3–1)	**Curt Schilling** (8–6)	None	52,015	57–32
–	July 13	**1993 Major League Baseball All-Star Game at Oriole Park at Camden Yards in Baltimore**						
90	July 15	@ Padres	2–5	Greg W. Harris (9–9)	**Danny Jackson** (7–7)	Mark Davis (1)	16,542	57–33
91	July 16	@ Padres	3–5	Pedro Martínez (1–0)	**Tommy Greene** (11–3)	Mark Davis (2)	20,763	57–34
92	July 17	@ Padres	2–4	Andy Benes (10–6)	**Terry Mulholland** (9–7)	Gene Harris (16)	32,505	57–35
93	July 18	@ Padres	6–3	**Curt Schilling** (9–6)	Doug Brocail (2–5)	**Mitch Williams** (24)	12,569	58–35
94	July 19	@ Dodgers	7–5	**Roger Mason** (1–7)	Omar Daal (1–3)	**Mitch Williams** (25)	33,615	59–35
95	July 20	@ Dodgers	8–2	**Danny Jackson** (8–7)	Ramón Martínez (8–5)	None	35,273	60–35
96	July 21	@ Dodgers	7–0	**Tommy Greene** (12–3)	Orel Hershiser (7–9)	None	47,893	61–35
97	July 22	@ Giants	1–4	John Burkett (14–4)	**Terry Mulholland** (9–8)	Rod Beck (27)	35,342	61–36
98	July 23	@ Giants	2–1 (14)	**David West** (2–2)	Mike Jackson (5–3)	**Mitch Williams** (26)	37,095	62–36
99	July 24	@ Giants	4–5	Dave Burba (8–2)	**Ben Rivera** (9–5)	Rod Beck (28)	51,557	62–37
100	July 25	@ Giants	2–5	Bill Swift (14–5)	**Danny Jackson** (8–8)	Dave Righetti (1)	49,935	62–38
101	July 27	Cardinals	10–7	**Roger Mason** (2–7)	Joe Magrane (8–9)	**Mitch Williams** (27)	45,383	63–38
102	July 28	Cardinals	14–6	**Terry Mulholland** (10–8)	Lee Guetterman (2–2)	None	46,346	64–38
103	July 29	Cardinals	6–4	**David West** (3–2)	Rob Murphy (1–5)	**Mitch Williams** (28)	55,884	65–38
104	July 30	Pirates	2–4	Bob Walk (11–8)	**Ben Rivera** (9–6)	Stan Belinda (19)	47,406	65–39
105	July 31	Pirates	10–2	**Danny Jackson** (9–8)	Randy Tomlin (3–8)	None	48,171	66–39

August (16–11)

#	Date	Opponent	Score	Win	Loss	Save	Attendance	Record
106	August 1	Pirates	5–4	**Roger Mason** (3–7)	Steve Cooke (5–7)	**Mitch Williams** (29)	46,693	67–39
107	August 3	@ Braves	5–3	**Terry Mulholland** (11–8)	Steve Avery (11–4)	**Mitch Williams** (30)	49,102	68–39
108	August 4	@ Braves	8–9	Jay Howell (2–3)	**David West** (3–3)	Greg McMichael (4)	46,144	68–40
109	August 5	@ Braves	10–4	**Ben Rivera** (10–6)	Greg Maddux (12–9)	None	49,070	69–40
110	August 6	@ Marlins	3–4	Luis Aquino (5–6)	**Roger Mason** (3–8)	Bryan Harvey (33)	43,670	69–41
111	August 7	@ Marlins	8–7 (10)	**Mitch Williams** (3–3)	Matt Turner (2–4)	None	44,689	70–41
112	August 8	@ Marlins	5–6	Charlie Hough (7–11)	**Terry Mulholland** (11–9)	Bryan Harvey (34)	43,186	70–42
113	August 10	Expos	5–2	**Curt Schilling** (10–6)	Chris Nabholz (7–8)	None	43,104	71–42
114	August 11	Expos	6–5	**David West** (4–3)	John Wetteland (7–3)	None	45,260	72–42
115	August 12	Expos	7–4	**Roger Mason** (4–8)	Tim Scott (4–2)	**Mitch Williams** (31)	45,002	73–42
116	August 13	Mets	9–5	**Bobby Thigpen** (1–0)	Anthony Young (1–14)	None	40,552	74–42
117	August 14	Mets	5–9	Bobby J. Jones (1–0)	**Danny Jackson** (9–9)	Jeff Innis (2)	46,393	74–43
118	August 15	Mets	5–4	**David West** (5–3)	Anthony Young (1–15)	**Mitch Williams** (32)	58,103	75–43
119	August 17	@ Rockies	10–7	**Ben Rivera** (11–6)	Armando Reynoso (8–9)	**Mitch Williams** (33)	63,183	76–43
120	August 18	@ Rockies	7–6	**Bobby Thigpen** (2–0)	Bruce Ruffin (4–5)	**Mitch Williams** (34)	61,056	77–43
121	August 18	@ Rockies	5–6	Marcus Moore (2–0)	**Roger Mason** (4–9)	Darren Holmes (15)	53,443	77–44
122	August 20	@ Astros	6–4	**David West** (6–3)	Todd Jones (0–1)	**Mitch Williams** (35)	33,080	78–44
123	August 21	@ Astros	2–3 (10)	Doug Jones (4–9)	**Larry Andersen** (3–2)	None	27,507	78–45
124	August 22	@ Astros	3–7	Darryl Kile (14–4)	**Ben Rivera** (11–7)	None	28,940	78–46
125	August 23	Rockies	2–3 (13)	Gary Wayne (4–3)	**Roger Mason** (4–10)	Darren Holmes (18)	40,481	78–47
126	August 24	Rockies	4–2	**Danny Jackson** (10–9)	Willie Blair (5–10)	**Mitch Williams** (36)	43,419	79–47
127	August 25	Rockies	8–5	**Curt Schilling** (11–6)	Mo Sanford (1–1)	None	46,448	80–47
128	August 27	Reds	5–8	Johnny Ruffin (2–1)	**Mitch Williams** (3–4)	Rob Dibble (19)	41,540	80–48
129	August 28	Reds	5–9	Scott Service (2–0)	**Bobby Thigpen** (2–1)	None	42,924	80–49
130	August 29	Reds	12–0	**Danny Jackson** (11–9)	Tim Pugh (8–13)	None	58,363	81–49
131	August 30	@ Cubs	6–10 (11)	Dan Plesac (2–1)	**Roger Mason** (4–11)	None	33,276	81–50
132	August 31	@ Cubs	7–0	**Ben Rivera** (12–7)	Mike Morgan (8–13)	None	19,961	82–50

September (14–13)

#	Date	Opponent	Score	Win	Loss	Save	Attendance	Record
133	September 1	@ Cubs	4–1	**Terry Mulholland** (12–9)	Mike Harkey (8–8)	None	23,519	83–50
134	September 3	@ Reds	14–2	**Tommy Greene** (13–3)	Bobby Ayala (5–7)	None	26,157	84–50
135	September 4	@ Reds	5–6	José Rijo (13–7)	**Danny Jackson** (11–10)	Scott Service (1)	31,166	84–51
136	September 5	@ Reds	5–3	**Curt Schilling** (12–6)	Tim Pugh (8–14)	**Mitch Williams** (37)	28,741	85–51
137	September 6	Cubs	6–7	Mike Harkey (9–8)	**Mike Williams** (1–1)	Randy Myers (40)	30,765	85–52
138	September 7	Cubs	4–5	José Guzmán (12–10)	**Ben Rivera** (12–8)	Randy Myers (41)	27,041	85–53
139	September 8	Cubs	5–8	Greg Hibbard (12–11)	**David West** (6–4)	Randy Myers (42)	26,553	85–54
140	September 9	Cubs	10–8	**Danny Jackson** (12–10)	José Bautista (7–3)	**David West** (3)	25,894	86–54
141	September 10	Astros	6–2	**Curt Schilling** (13–6)	Greg Swindell (10–12)	None	31,146	87–54
142	September 11	Astros	1–4	Mark Portugal (15–4)	**Mike Williams** (1–2)	Todd Jones (2)	45,738	87–55
143	September 12	Astros	2–9	Pete Harnisch (14–8)	**Ben Rivera** (12–9)	None	46,238	87–56
144	September 13	@ Mets	5–0	**Tommy Greene** (14–3)	Bobby J. Jones (2–3)	None	17,497	88–56
145	September 14	@ Mets	4–5	Frank Tanana (7–15)	**Danny Jackson** (12–11)	John Franco (10)	18,292	88–57
146	September 15	@ Mets	6–3	**Curt Schilling** (14–6)	Pete Schourek (3–11)	**Mitch Williams** (38)	18,632	89–57
147	September 17	@ Expos	7–8 (12)	Tim Scott (6–2)	**Mitch Williams** (3–5)	None	45,757	89–58
148	September 18	@ Expos	5–4	**Tommy Greene** (15–3)	Denis Boucher (1–1)	**Mitch Williams** (39)	50,438	90–58
149	September 19	@ Expos	5–6	Tim Scott (7–2)	**Mitch Williams** (3–6)	None	40,047	90–59
150	September 20	Marlins	7–1	**Curt Schilling** (15–6)	Charlie Hough (9–16)	None	31,454	91–59
151	September 21	Marlins	5–3	**Donn Pall** (3–3)	Rich Rodriguez (2–4)	**Mitch Williams** (40)	32,165	92–59
152	September 22	Marlins	2–1 (12)	**Roger Mason** (5–11)	Bryan Harvey (1–5)	None	31,556	93–59
153	September 24	Braves	3–0	**Tommy Greene** (16–3)	Tom Glavine (20–6)	**Mitch Williams** (41)	57,792	94–59
154	September 25	Braves	7–9	Steve Bedrosian (5–2)	**Roger Mason** (5–12)	Greg McMichael (16)	57,146	94–60
155	September 26	Braves	2–7	Steve Avery (17–6)	**Curt Schilling** (15–7)	None	57,588	94–61
156	September 27	@ Pirates	6–4	**Ben Rivera** (13–9)	Steve Cooke (10–10)	**Mitch Williams** (42)	15,847	95–61
157	September 28	@ Pirates	10–7	**Bobby Thigpen** (3–1)	Rich Robertson (0–1)	None	17,386	96–61
158	September 29	@ Pirates	1–9	Bob Walk (13–14)	**Kevin Foster** (0–1)	Joel Johnston (2)	21,159	96–62
159	September 30	@ Pirates	0–5	Tim Wakefield (6–11)	**Tommy Greene** (16–4)	None	10,448	96–63

October (1–2)

#	Date	Opponent	Score	Win	Loss	Save	Attendance	Record
160	October 1	@ Cardinals	4–2	**Curt Schilling** (16–7)	Omar Olivares (5–3)	**Mitch Williams** (43)	26,870	97–63
161	October 2	@ Cardinals	4–5 (10)	Rob Murphy (5–7)	**Mike Williams** (1–3)	None	31,501	97–64
162	October 3	@ Cardinals	0–2	Lee Guetterman (3–3)	**Mitch Williams** (3–7)	Mike Pérez (7)	40,247	97–65

- Phillies win
- Phillies loss
- All-Star Game
- Game postponed
- Bold: Phillies team member

=== Roster ===
1993 Philadelphia Phillies
**Roster**
**Pitchers**: 47 Larry Andersen; 55 Bob Ayrault; 31 Brad Brink; 48 Mark Davis; 50 José DeLeón; 58 Paul Fletcher; 57 Kevin Foster; 28 Tyler Green; 49 Tommy Greene; 27 Danny Jackson; 48 Roger Mason; 52 Tim Mauser; 45 Terry Mulholland; 39 Donn Pall; 34 Ben Rivera; 38 Curt Schilling; 37 Bobby Thigpen; 40 David West; 41 Mike Williams; 99 Mitch Williams	**Catchers**: 10 Darren Daulton; 35 Doug Lindsey; 23 Todd Pratt; **Infielders**: 5 Kim Batiste; 24 Juan Bell; 7 Mariano Duncan; 15 Dave Hollins; 17 Ricky Jordan; 29 John Kruk; 30 Jeff Manto; 24 Joe Millette; 12 Mickey Morandini; 19 Kevin Stocker	**Outfielders**: 33 Rubén Amaro, Jr.; 44 Wes Chamberlain; 4 Lenny Dykstra; 8 Jim Eisenreich; 22 Pete Incaviglia; 16 Tony Longmire; 25 Milt Thompson	**Manager**: 11 Jim Fregosi; **Coaches**: 2 Larry Bowa (Third base); 14 Denis Menke (Hitting); 46 Johnny Podres (Pitching); 26 Mel Roberts (First base); 9 Mike Ryan (Bullpen); 18 John Vukovich (Bench)

== Postseason ==
=== Postseason game log ===
1993 Postseason game log (Overall Record: 6–6)
1993 National League Championship Series vs. Atlanta Braves – Philadelphia wins series 4–2

#	Date	Opponent	Score	Win	Loss	Save	Attendance	Record
1	October 6	Braves	4–3 (10)	Mitch Williams (1–0)	Greg McMichael (0–1)	None	62,012	1–0
2	October 7	Braves	3–14	Greg Maddux (1–0)	Tommy Greene (0–1)	None	62,436	1–1
3	October 9	@ Braves	4–9	Tom Glavine (1–0)	Terry Mulholland (0–1)	None	52,032	1–2
4	October 10	@ Braves	2–1	Danny Jackson (1–0)	John Smoltz (0–1)	Mitch Williams (1)	52,032	2–2
5	October 11	@ Braves	4–3 (10)	Mitch Williams (2–0)	Mark Wohlers (0–1)	Larry Andersen (1)	52,032	3–2
6	October 13	Braves	6–3	Tommy Greene (1–1)	Greg Maddux (1–1)	Mitch Williams (2)	62,502	4–2

1993 World Series vs. Toronto Blue Jays – Toronto wins series 4–2

#	Date	Opponent	Score	Win	Loss	Save	Attendance	Record
7	October 16	@ Blue Jays	5–8	Al Leiter (1–0)	Curt Schilling (0–1)	Duane Ward (3)	52,011	0–1
8	October 17	@ Blue Jays	6–4	Terry Mulholland (1–1)	Dave Stewart (2–1)	Mitch Williams (3)	52,062	1–1
9	October 19	Blue Jays	3–10	Pat Hentgen (1–1)	Danny Jackson (1–1)	None	62,689	1–2
10	October 20	Blue Jays	14–15	Tony Castillo (1–0)	Mitch Williams (2–1)	Duane Ward (4)	62,731	1–3
11	October 21	Blue Jays	2–0	Curt Schilling (1–1)	Juan Guzmán (2–1)	None	62,706	2–3
12	October 23	@ Blue Jays	6–8	Duane Ward (1–0)	Mitch Williams (2–2)	None	52,195	2–4

- Phillies win
- Phillies loss
- Game postponed

=== National League Championship Series ===
==== Game 1 ====
October 6: Veterans Stadium in Philadelphia

Team	1	2	3	4	5	6	7	8	9	10	R	H	E
Atlanta	0	0	1	1	0	0	0	0	1	0	3	9	0
Philadelphia	1	0	0	1	0	1	0	0	0	1	4	9	1
W: Mitch Williams (1–0) L: Greg McMichael (0–1) S: None
HR: ATL – None PHI – Pete Incaviglia
Pitchers: ATL – Avery (6), Mercker (2), McMichael (1 1/3) PHI – Schilling (8), Williams (2)
Attendance: 62,012 Time: 3:33

==== Game 2 ====
October 7: Veterans Stadium in Philadelphia

Team	1	2	3	4	5	6	7	8	9	R	H	E
Atlanta	2	0	6	0	1	0	0	4	1	14	16	0
Philadelphia	0	0	0	2	0	0	0	0	1	3	7	2
W: Greg Maddux (1–0) L: Tommy Greene (0–1) S: None
HR: ATL – Fred McGriff, Jeff Blauser, Damon Berryhill, Terry Pendleton PHI – Dave Hollins, Lenny Dykstra
Pitchers: ATL – Maddux (7), Stanton (1), Wohlers (1) PHI – Greene (2 1/3), Thigpen (2/3), Rivera (2), Mason (2), West (1), Andersen (1)
Attendance: 62,346 Time: 3:14

==== Game 3 ====
October 9: Atlanta–Fulton County Stadium in Atlanta

Team	1	2	3	4	5	6	7	8	9	R	H	E
Philadelphia	0	0	0	1	0	1	0	1	1	4	10	1
Atlanta	0	0	0	0	0	5	4	0	X	9	12	0
W: Tom Glavine (1–0) L: Terry Mulholland (0–1) S: None
HR: PHI – John Kruk ATL – None
Pitchers: PHI – Mulholland (5), Mason (1), Andersen (1/3), West (2/3), Thigpen (1) ATL – Glavine (7), Mercker (1), McMichael (1)
Attendance: 52,032 Time: 2:44

==== Game 4 ====
October 10: Atlanta–Fulton County Stadium in Atlanta

Team	1	2	3	4	5	6	7	8	9	R	H	E
Philadelphia	0	0	0	2	0	0	0	0	0	2	8	1
Atlanta	0	1	0	0	0	0	0	0	0	1	10	1
W: Danny Jackson (1–0) L: John Smoltz (0–1) S: Mitch Williams (1)
HR: PHI – None ATL – None
Pitchers: PHI – Jackson (7 2/3), Williams (1 1/3) ATL – Smoltz (6 1/3), Mercker (2/3), Wohlers (2)
Attendance: 52,032 Time: 3:33

==== Game 5 ====
October 11: Atlanta–Fulton County Stadium in Atlanta

Team	1	2	3	4	5	6	7	8	9	10	R	H	E
Philadelphia	1	0	0	1	0	0	0	0	1	1	4	6	1
Atlanta	0	0	0	0	0	0	0	0	3	0	3	7	1
W: Mitch Williams (2–0) L: Mark Wohlers (0–1) S: Larry Andersen (1)
HR: PHI – Darren Daulton, Lenny Dykstra ATL – None
Pitchers: PHI – Schilling (8), Williams (1), Andersen (1) ATL – Avery (7), Mercker (1), McMichael (1), Wohlers (1)
Attendance: 52,032 Time: 3:21

==== Game 6 ====
October 13: Veterans Stadium in Philadelphia

Team	1	2	3	4	5	6	7	8	9	R	H	E
Atlanta	0	0	0	0	1	0	2	0	0	3	5	3
Philadelphia	0	0	2	0	2	2	0	0	0	6	7	1
W: Tommy Greene (1–1) L: Greg Maddux (1–1) S: Mitch Williams (2)
HR: ATL – Jeff Blauser PHI – Dave Hollins
Pitchers: ATL – Maddux (5 2/3), Mercker (1/3), McMichael (2/3), Wohlers (1 1/3) PHI – Greene (7), West (1), Williams (1)
Attendance: 62,502 Time: 3:04

=== World series ===
==== Game 1 ====
October 16, 1993, at the SkyDome in Toronto, Ontario, Canada

The series' first game sent two staff aces -- Curt Schilling for Philadelphia and Juan Guzmán for Toronto—against one another. The result was less than a pitcher's duel, however, as both teams scored early and often.

The deciding plays came in the middle innings. With Toronto behind 4–3 in the 5th inning, Devon White hit a solo home run to tie the game. The next inning, John Olerud hit a solo home run of his own to put Toronto on top. Toronto added three insurance runs in the bottom of the 7th and held on to win 8–5. Al Leiter pitched 2 2/3 innings—in relief of a sporadic Juan Guzman, who walked four in just five innings—for his first World Series win. John Kruk had three hits for Philadelphia.

Team	1	2	3	4	5	6	7	8	9	R	H	E
Philadelphia	2	0	1	0	1	0	0	0	1	5	11	1
Toronto	0	2	1	0	1	1	3	0	X	8	10	3
W: Al Leiter (1–0) L: Curt Schilling (0–1) S: Duane Ward (1)
HR – TOR: Devon White (1), John Olerud (1)

==== Game 2 ====
October 17, 1993, at SkyDome in Toronto, Ontario, Canada

In the second game of the series, Dave Stewart was on the mound for Toronto and Terry Mulholland started for Philadelphia. Philadelphia jumped out to an early lead: in the third inning, Jim Eisenreich followed John Kruk and Dave Hollins RBI singles with a three-run home run to deep right-center. Toronto got on the scoreboard in the fourth inning courtesy of a Joe Carter two-run home run to left, but the Jays were unable to mount a significant offensive push later in the game. Philadelphia held on to win 6–4. Terry Mulholland pitched 5 2/3 innings, allowing 3 earned runs, for the win.

Team	1	2	3	4	5	6	7	8	9	R	H	E
Philadelphia	0	0	5	0	0	0	1	0	0	6	12	0
Toronto	0	0	0	2	0	1	0	1	0	4	8	0
W: Terry Mulholland (1–0) L: Dave Stewart (0–1) S: Mitch Williams (1)
HR: PHI – Jim Eisenreich (1), Lenny Dykstra (1) TOR – Joe Carter (1)

==== Game 3 ====
October 19, 1993, at Veterans Stadium in Philadelphia

For Toronto, Pat Hentgen faced off against Philadelphia starter Danny Jackson in Game 3. Hentgen pitched a strong 6 innings, allowing just 1 run, and the Toronto offense took care of the rest. Toronto won 10–3.

Toronto manager Cito Gaston was faced with an unusual and difficult decision prior to game time. As the series switched the National League ballpark, Gaston was forced to sit one player from his regular lineup as the designated hitter (DH) would not be allowed to play. As regular DH Paul Molitor had been a hot hand in the lineup, Gaston elected to sit firstbaseman John Olerud and place Molitor at first base. The decision was potentially controversial as Olerud led the American League in batting during the year with a .363 average and Molitor was the less sure-handed fielder. Molitor, however, put these concerns to rest, going 3 for 4, hitting a home run in the 3rd inning, and driving in 3 runs.

Team	1	2	3	4	5	6	7	8	9	R	H	E
Toronto	3	0	1	0	0	1	3	0	2	10	13	1
Philadelphia	0	0	0	0	1	0	1	0	1	3	9	0
W: Pat Hentgen (1–0) L: Danny Jackson (0–1)
HR: TOR – Paul Molitor (1) PHI – Milt Thompson (1)

==== Game 4 ====
October 20, 1993, at Veterans Stadium in Philadelphia

In the fourth game of the series, Todd Stottlemyre started for Toronto while Tommy Greene started for Philadelphia. The starters are notable because neither lasted three innings.

In one of the more unusual plays in World Series history, Todd Stottlemyre, trying to go first to third on a Roberto Alomar single in the 2nd inning, did a bellyflop diving into third base, where he was called out. Todd's awkward dive resulted in an abrasion on his chin and appeared to shake him up in the next inning, during which he surrendered a Lenny Dykstra two-run home run. Stottlemyre was pulled after the second inning, having already given up six runs. (Tommy Greene fared little better, being pulled after giving up seven runs in 2 1/3 innings.)

Philadelphia took a commanding 12–7 lead in the 5th inning, courtesy of two-run home runs from Darren Daulton and Dykstra, and a run-scoring double from Milt Thompson.

Toronto fought back from a 14–9 deficit in the 8th inning, scoring six runs on run-scoring hits from Paul Molitor, Tony Fernández, Rickey Henderson, and Devon White. Duane Ward pitched the final 1 1/3 innings, preserving the 15–14 victory. Three new World Series records included the longest game at four hours fourteen minutes (4:14), most runs by both clubs with twenty-nine (29), and runs scored by a losing team with fourteen (14).

Also, Charlie Williams became the first African American to serve as the home plate umpire for a World Series game.

Team	1	2	3	4	5	6	7	8	9	R	H	E
Toronto	3	0	4	0	0	2	0	6	0	15	18	0
Philadelphia	4	2	0	1	5	1	1	0	0	14	14	0
W: Tony Castillo (1–0) L: Mitch Williams (0–1) S: Duane Ward (2)
HR: PHI – Lenny Dykstra 2 (3), Darren Daulton (1)

==== Game 5 ====
October 21, 1993, at Veterans Stadium in Philadelphia

The offenses were due for an off-day, and it came in Game 5 courtesy of a Curt Schilling (Philadelphia) and Juan Guzmán (Toronto) pitching duel. Schilling shut down the previously unstoppable Toronto offense, limiting the team to just five hits and no runs. Guzman pitched well in a losing effort, allowing only two runs and five hits in seven innings of work.

The two runs scored as a result of scrappy play from the Philadelphia offense. In the first inning, Lenny Dykstra walked, stole second, moved to third on a Pat Borders throwing error, and scored on a John Kruk ground out. In the second inning, Darren Daulton opened with a double, took third on a ground out, and scored on a Kevin Stocker single.

This would be the Phillies' final victory in a postseason game until their championship winning 2008 season.

Team	1	2	3	4	5	6	7	8	9	R	H	E
Toronto	0	0	0	0	0	0	0	0	0	0	5	1
Philadelphia	1	1	0	0	0	0	0	0	X	2	5	1
W: Curt Schilling (1–1) L: Juan Guzmán (1–1)

==== Game 6 ====
October 23, 1993, at SkyDome in Toronto, Ontario, Canada

The sixth game in the series was a rematch between Game 2 starters Terry Mulholland and Dave Stewart, who would have similar results. Toronto opened up the scoring in the bottom of the first with a run-scoring Paul Molitor triple, Joe Carter sacrifice fly, and Roberto Alomar RBI single. Molitor added a solo home run in the 5th inning, bringing the score to 5–1 for Toronto.

In the 7th inning, Philadelphia fought back with five runs to take a 6–5 lead. Lenny Dykstra hit a three-run home run, Dave Hollins had an RBI single and Pete Incaviglia hit a sacrifice fly. The inning brought an end to Dave Stewart's night, leaving the game with 6 innings pitched and 4 runs given up.

Philadelphia closer Mitch Williams came on to the pitch the bottom of the 9th with Philadelphia clinging to a 6–5 lead. After beginning the inning by walking Rickey Henderson, Williams tried to counter Henderson's speed by pitching out of a slide-step style of pitching delivery. Prior to Game 6 of the 1993 World Series, Williams never used the slide-step delivery in his career. This may have cut back on the velocity of the hard throwing Williams. The walk to Henderson was followed by a Devon White fly out and a single by Paul Molitor. Joe Carter came up next and, on a two strike pitch, he hit an inside pitch just over the left field fence, giving the Blue Jays a come-from-behind 8–6 victory, and the World Series crown.

Team	1	2	3	4	5	6	7	8	9	R	H	E
Philadelphia	0	0	0	1	0	0	5	0	0	6	7	0
Toronto	3	0	0	1	1	0	0	0	3	8	10	2
W: Duane Ward (1–0) L: Mitch Williams (0–2)
HR: PHI – Lenny Dykstra (4) TOR – Paul Molitor (2), Joe Carter (2)

== Awards and honors ==
- Jim Fregosi, Associated Press Manager of the Year

1993 Major League Baseball All-Star Game

- Terry Mulholland, pitcher, starter
- Darren Daulton, catcher, starter
- John Kruk, first base, starter
- Dave Hollins, third base, reserve

=== Team leaders ===
- Games – Lenny Dykstra (161)
- At-Bats – Lenny Dykstra (637)
- Runs – Lenny Dykstra (143)
- Hits – Lenny Dykstra (194)
- Doubles – Lenny Dykstra (44)
- Triples – Mickey Morandini (9)
- Home Runs – Pete Incaviglia and Darren Daulton (24)
- Runs Batted In – Darren Daulton (105)
- Walks – Lenny Dykstra (129)
- Batting average – John Kruk (.316)
- On Base Percentage – John Kruk (.430)
- Slugging Average – Darren Daulton and Lenny Dykstra (.482)
- Stolen Bases – Lenny Dykstra (37)
- Wins – Curt Schilling and Tommy Greene (16)
- Innings Pitched – Curt Schilling (235.1)
- Earned Run Average – (Starters) Terry Mulholland (3.25), (Relievers) David West and Larry Andersen (2.92)
- Strikeouts – Curt Schilling (186)

== Player stats ==
=== Batting ===
==== Starters by position ====
Note: Pos = Position; G = Games played; AB = At bats; H = Hits; Avg. = Batting average; HR = Home runs; RBI = Runs batted in

Pos	Player	G	AB	H	Avg.	HR	RBI
C	Darren Daulton	147	510	131	.257	24	105
1B	John Kruk	150	535	169	.316	14	85
2B	Mickey Morandini	120	425	105	.247	3	33
SS	Kevin Stocker	70	259	84	.324	2	31
3B	Dave Hollins	143	543	148	.273	18	93
LF	Milt Thompson	129	340	89	.262	4	44
CF	Lenny Dykstra	161	637	194	.305	19	66
RF	Jim Eisenreich	153	362	115	.318	7	54

==== Other batters ====
Note: Pos = Position; G = Games played; AB = At bats; H = Hits; Avg. = Batting average; HR = Home runs; RBI = Runs batted in

Pos	Player	G	AB	H	Avg.	HR	RBI
MI	Mariano Duncan	124	496	140	.282	11	73
LF	Pete Incaviglia	116	368	101	.274	24	89
RF	Wes Chamberlain	96	284	80	.282	12	45
1B	Ricky Jordan	90	159	46	.289	5	18
IF	Kim Batiste	79	156	44	.282	5	29
C	Todd Pratt	33	87	25	.287	5	13
SS	Juan Bell	24	65	13	.200	0	7
OF	Rubén Amaro	25	48	16	.333	1	6
3B	Jeff Manto	8	18	1	.056	0	0
LF	Tony Longmire	11	13	3	.231	0	1
IF	Joe Millette	10	10	2	.200	0	2
C	Doug Lindsey	2	2	1	.500	0	0

=== Pitching ===
==== Starting pitchers ====
Note: G = Games pitched; IP = Innings pitched; W = Wins; L = Losses; ERA = Earned run average; SO = Strikeouts

Player	G	IP	W	L	ERA	SO
Curt Schilling	34	235.1	16	7	4.02	186
Danny Jackson	32	210.1	12	11	3.77	120
Tommy Greene	31	200.0	16	4	3.42	167
Terry Mulholland	29	191.0	12	9	3.25	116
Ben Rivera	30	163.0	13	9	5.02	123

==== Other pitchers ====
Note: G = Games pitched; IP = Innings pitched; W = Wins; L = Losses; ERA = Earned run average; SO = Strikeouts

Player	G	IP	W	L	ERA	SO
Mike Williams	17	51.0	1	3	5.29	33
José DeLeón	24	47.0	3	0	3.26	34
Tyler Green	3	7.1	0	0	7.36	7
Kevin Foster	2	6.2	0	1	14.85	6

==== Relief pitchers ====
Note: G = Games pitched; IP = Innings pitched; W = Wins; L = Losses; SV = Saves; ERA = Earned run average; SO = Strikeouts

Player	G	IP	W	L	SV	ERA	SO
Mitch Williams (Closer)	65	62.0	3	7	43	3.34	60
David West	76	86.1	6	4	3	2.92	87
Larry Andersen	64	61.2	3	2	0	2.92	67
Roger Mason	34	49.2	5	5	0	4.89	32
Mark Davis	25	31.1	1	2	0	5.17	28
Bobby Thigpen	17	19.1	3	1	0	6.05	10
Bob Ayrault	10	10.1	2	0	0	9.58	8
Donn Pall	8	17.2	1	0	0	2.55	11
Tim Mauser	8	16.1	0	0	0	4.96	14
Brad Brink	2	6.0	0	0	0	3.00	8
Paul Fletcher	1	0.1	0	0	0	0.00	0

== Farm system ==
Level	Team	League	Manager
AAA	Scranton/Wilkes-Barre; Red Barons	International League	Lee Elia
AA	Reading Phillies	Eastern League	Don McCormack
A	Clearwater Phillies	Florida State League	Bill Dancy
A	Spartanburg Phillies	South Atlantic League	Roy Majtyka
A-Short Season	Batavia Clippers	New York–Penn League	Al LeBoeuf
Rookie	Martinsville Phillies	Appalachian League	Ramon Henderson

LEAGUE CHAMPIONS: Clearwater
