= 1993 Atlanta Braves season =

1993 Atlanta Braves
- National League West champions
- League: National League
- Division: West
- Ballpark: Fulton County Stadium
- City: Atlanta
- Record: 104–58 (.642)
- Divisional place: 1st
- Owners: Ted Turner
- General managers: John Schuerholz
- Managers: Bobby Cox
- Television: WTBS; TBS Superstation (Pete Van Wieren, Skip Caray, Don Sutton, Joe Simpson); SportSouth (Ernie Johnson, Ernie Johnson, Jr.)
- Radio: WGST (Pete Van Wieren, Skip Caray, Don Sutton, Joe Simpson)

The 1993 Atlanta Braves season was the Braves' 123rd in existence and their 28th since moving to Atlanta. The Braves were looking to improve on their 98–64 record from 1992 and win the National League pennant for a third consecutive year, and finally win a World Series in the 1990s.

The Braves finished the season with a 104–58 record to win the National League West for the third consecutive year after trailing the San Francisco Giants, who finished in second place by one game, for most of the season in what is generally regarded as the last real pennant race before playoff expansion. 1993 was also the last year that the team competed in the National League West, as they would shift to the National League East for 1994. The Braves did not record a single losing record against any team in the division.

The 1993 Atlanta Braves are seen as one of the greatest Major League Baseball teams in history. Despite their excellent regular season, the Braves' streak of National League pennants ended at two as they fell to the underdog Philadelphia Phillies in six games in the NLCS. By a twist of fate, the Braves beat the Pittsburgh Pirates, the Phillies in-state rivals, in back-to-back NLCS series in 1991 and 1992, but in 1993, lost to the Pirates in-state rivals.

== Offseason ==
- December 7, 1992: Billy Taylor was drafted by the Toronto Blue Jays from the Atlanta Braves in the 1992 rule 5 draft.
- December 9, 1992: Greg Maddux was signed as a free agent with the Atlanta Braves.
- December 21, 1992: Randy St. Claire was signed as a free agent with the Atlanta Braves.
- December 21, 1992: Jerry Willard was signed as a free agent with the Atlanta Braves.

== Regular season ==
- At the end of August, the Atlanta Braves tried to acquire Dennis Martínez from the Montreal Expos. The Expos placed Martinez's name on the waiver wire and the Braves claimed him. The Expos were not about to let Martinez go to Atlanta for the waiver fee of $20,000. After claiming Martinez, the Expos contacted the Braves to see if they were interested in talking about a trade. Martinez had the final word on any movement because his seniority gave him veto rights over a trade.
- On September 11, 1993, Chipper Jones made his major league baseball debut. It was in a game against the San Diego Padres. Jones did not have any at-bats in the game.

=== Transactions ===
- April 3, 1993: Billy Taylor was returned (earlier draft pick) by the Toronto Blue Jays to the Atlanta Braves.
- April 13, 1993: Mark Davis was traded by the Atlanta Braves to the Philadelphia Phillies for Brad Hassinger (minors).
- May 3, 1993: Randy St. Claire was released by the Atlanta Braves.
- June 3, 1993: John Rocker was drafted by the Atlanta Braves in the 18th round of the 1993 amateur draft. Player signed August 23, 1993.
- July 18, 1993: Fred McGriff was traded by the San Diego Padres to the Atlanta Braves for Melvin Nieves, Donnie Elliott, and Vince Moore (minors).

=== Opening Day starters ===
- Jeff Blauser
- Sid Bream
- Ron Gant
- Tom Glavine
- David Justice
- Mark Lemke
- Greg Olson
- Terry Pendleton
- Deion Sanders

=== Season standings ===
NL West
Team	W	L	Pct.	GB	Home	Road
Atlanta Braves	104	58	.642	—	51‍–‍30	53‍–‍28
San Francisco Giants	103	59	.636	1	50‍–‍31	53‍–‍28
Houston Astros	85	77	.525	19	44‍–‍37	41‍–‍40
Los Angeles Dodgers	81	81	.500	23	41‍–‍40	40‍–‍41
Cincinnati Reds	73	89	.451	31	41‍–‍40	32‍–‍49
Colorado Rockies	67	95	.414	37	39‍–‍42	28‍–‍53
San Diego Padres	61	101	.377	43	34‍–‍47	27‍–‍54

=== Record vs. opponents ===
1993 National League record Source: MLB Standings Grid – 1993
Team	ATL	CHC	CIN	COL	FLA	HOU	LAD	MON	NYM	PHI	PIT	SD	SF	STL
Atlanta	—	7–5	10–3	13–0	7–5	8–5	8–5	7–5	9–3	6–6	7–5	9–4	7–6	6–6
Chicago	5–7	—	7–5	8–4	6–7	4–8	7–5	5–8–1	8–5	7–6	5–8	8–4	6–6	8–5
Cincinnati	3–10	5–7	—	9–4	7–5	6–7	5–8	4–8	6–6	4–8	8–4	9–4	2–11	5–7
Colorado	0–13	4–8	4–9	—	7–5	11–2	7–6	3–9	6–6	3–9	8–4	6–7	3–10	5–7
Florida	5–7	7–6	5–7	5–7	—	3–9	5–7	5–8	4–9	4–9	6–7	7–5	4–8	4–9
Houston	5–8	8–4	7–6	2–11	9–3	—	9–4	5–7	11–1	5–7	7–5	8–5	3–10	6–6
Los Angeles	5–8	5–7	8–5	6–7	7–5	4–9	—	6–6	8–4	2–10	8–4	9–4	7–6	6–6
Montreal	5–7	8–5–1	8–4	9–3	8–5	7–5	6–6	—	9–4	6–7	8–5	10–2	3–9	7–6
New York	3–9	5–8	6–6	6–6	9–4	1–11	4–8	4–9	—	3–10	4–9	5–7	4–8	5–8
Philadelphia	6-6	6–7	8–4	9–3	9–4	7–5	10–2	7–6	10–3	—	7–6	6–6	4–8	8–5
Pittsburgh	5–7	8–5	4–8	4–8	7–6	5–7	4–8	5–8	9–4	6–7	—	9–3	5–7	4–9
San Diego	4–9	4–8	4–9	7–6	5–7	5–8	4–9	2–10	7–5	6–6	3–9	—	3–10	7–5
San Francisco	6–7	6–6	11–2	10–3	8–4	10–3	6–7	9–3	8–4	8–4	7–5	10–3	—	4–8
St. Louis	6–6	5–8	7–5	7–5	9–4	6–6	6–6	6–7	8–5	5–8	9–4	5–7	8–4	—

=== Roster ===
1993 Atlanta Braves
Roster
Pitchers: 33 Steve Avery; 36 Steve Bedrosian; 51 Pedro Borbón, Jr.; 40 Marvin Freeman; 47 Tom Glavine; 52 Jay Howell; 31 Greg Maddux; 38 Greg McMichael; 50 Kent Mercker; 25 Pete Smith; 29 John Smoltz; 30 Mike Stanton; 43 Mark Wohlers	Catchers: 11 Damon Berryhill; 8 Javy López; 10 Greg Olson; Infielders: 2 Rafael Belliard; 4 Jeff Blauser; 12 Sid Bream; 19 Francisco Cabrera; 14 Brian Hunter; 16 Chipper Jones; 18 Ryan Klesko; 20 Mark Lemke; 27 Fred McGriff; 32 Bill Pecota; 9 Terry Pendleton	Outfielders: 5 Ron Gant; 23 David Justice; 1 Otis Nixon; 24 Deion Sanders; 26 Tony Tarasco	Manager: 6 Bobby Cox; Coaches: 37 Jim Beauchamp (bench); 39 Pat Corrales (first base); 28 Clarence Jones (hitting); 54 Leo Mazzone (pitching); 22 Jimy Williams (third base); 52 Ned Yost (bullpen)

=== Notable events ===
July 20, 1993: At Atlanta–Fulton County Stadium, a fire broke out in the skybox/press box area, delaying the start of the scheduled game between the Braves and the St. Louis Cardinals. Incidentally, the Braves' trade for Fred McGriff was completed a few days earlier and McGriff arrived at the stadium that night. With the delayed start, McGriff was able to suit up and start the game at first base. McGriff helped the Braves erase a 5–0 deficit by hitting a two-run homer in the sixth inning. The Braves went on to win the game, 8–5.

== Player stats ==
= Indicates team leader

=== Batting ===
==== Starters by position ====
Note: Pos = Position; G = Games played; AB = At bats; H = Hits; Avg. = Batting average; HR = Home runs; RBI = Runs batted in

Pos	Player	G	AB	H	Avg.	HR	RBI
C	Damon Berryhill	115	335	82	.245	8	43
1B	Sid Bream	117	277	72	.260	9	35
2B	Mark Lemke	151	493	124	.252	7	49
SS	Jeff Blauser	161	597	182	.305	15	73
3B	Terry Pendleton	161	633	172	.272	17	84
LF	Ron Gant	157	606	166	.274	36	117
CF	Otis Nixon	134	461	124	.269	1	24
RF	David Justice	157	585	158	.270	40	120

==== Other batters ====
Note: G = Games played; AB = At bats; H = Hits; Avg. = Batting average; HR = Home runs; RBI = Runs batted in

Player	G	AB	H	Avg.	HR	RBI
Deion Sanders	95	272	75	.276	6	28
Greg Olson	83	262	59	.225	4	24
Fred McGriff	68	255	79	.310	19	55
Francisco Cabrera	70	83	20	.241	4	11
Brian Hunter	37	80	11	.138	0	8
Rafael Belliard	91	79	18	.228	0	6
Bill Pecota	72	62	20	.323	0	5
Tony Tarasco	24	35	8	.229	0	2
Ryan Klesko	22	17	6	.353	2	5
Javy López	8	16	6	.375	1	2
Chipper Jones	8	3	2	.667	0	0
Ramon Caraballo	6	0	0	----	0	0

= Indicates league leader

=== Starting pitchers ===
Note: G = Games pitched; IP = Innings pitched; W = Wins; L = Losses; ERA = Earned run average; SO = Strikeouts

Player	G	IP	W	L	ERA	SO
Greg Maddux	36	267.0	20	10	2.36	197
John Smoltz	35	243.2	15	11	3.62	208
Tom Glavine	36	239.1	22	6	3.20	120
Steve Avery	35	223.1	18	6	2.94	125
Pete Smith	20	90.2	4	8	4.37	53

==== Other pitchers ====
Note: G = Games played; IP = Innings pitched; W = Wins; L = Losses; ERA = Earned run average; SO = Strikeouts

Player	G	IP	W	L	ERA	SO
Kent Mercker	43	66.0	3	1	2.86	59

===== Relief pitchers =====
Note: G = Games pitched; W = Wins; L = Losses; SV = Saves; ERA = Earned run average; SO = Strikeouts

Player	G	W	L	SV	ERA	SO
Mike Stanton	63	4	6	27	4.67	43
Greg McMichael	74	2	3	19	2.06	89
Jay Howell	54	3	3	0	2.31	37
Steve Bedrosian	49	5	2	0	1.63	33
Mark Wohlers	46	6	2	0	4.50	45
Marvin Freeman	21	2	0	0	6.08	25
Pedro Borbón Jr.	3	0	0	0	21.60	2

== National League Championship Series ==
=== Game 1 ===
October 6: Veterans Stadium in Philadelphia

Team	1	2	3	4	5	6	7	8	9	10	R	H	E
Atlanta	0	0	1	1	0	0	0	0	1	0	3	9	0
Philadelphia	1	0	0	1	0	1	0	0	0	1	4	9	1
W: Mitch Williams (1–0) L: Greg McMichael (0–1) S: None
HR: ATL – None PHI – Pete Incaviglia
Pitchers: ATL – Avery (6), Mercker (2), McMichael (1 1/3) PHI – Schilling (8), Williams (2)
Attendance: 62,012 Time: 3:33

=== Game 2 ===
October 7: Veterans Stadium in Philadelphia

Team	1	2	3	4	5	6	7	8	9	R	H	E
Atlanta	2	0	6	0	1	0	0	4	1	14	16	0
Philadelphia	0	0	0	2	0	0	0	0	1	3	7	2
W: Greg Maddux (1–0) L: Tommy Greene (0–1) S: None
HR: ATL – Fred McGriff, Jeff Blauser, Damon Berryhill, Terry Pendleton PHI – Dave Hollins, Lenny Dykstra
Pitchers: ATL – Maddux (7), Stanton (1), Wohlers (1) PHI – Greene (2 1/3), Thigpen (2/3), Rivera (2), Mason (2), West (1), Andersen (1)
Attendance: 62,346 Time: 3:14

=== Game 3 ===
October 9: Atlanta–Fulton County Stadium in Atlanta

Team	1	2	3	4	5	6	7	8	9	R	H	E
Philadelphia	0	0	0	1	0	1	0	1	1	4	10	1
Atlanta	0	0	0	0	0	5	4	0	X	9	12	0
W: Tom Glavine (1–0) L: Terry Mulholland (0–1) S: None
HR: PHI – John Kruk ATL – None
Pitchers: PHI – Mulholland (5), Mason (1), Andersen (1/3), West (2/3), Thigpen (1) ATL – Glavine (7), Mercker (1), McMichael (1)
Attendance: 52,032 Time: 2:44

=== Game 4 ===
October 10: Atlanta–Fulton County Stadium in Atlanta

Team	1	2	3	4	5	6	7	8	9	R	H	E
Philadelphia	0	0	0	2	0	0	0	0	0	2	8	1
Atlanta	0	1	0	0	0	0	0	0	0	1	10	1
W: Danny Jackson (1–0) L: John Smoltz (0–1) S: Mitch Williams (1)
HR: PHI – None ATL – None
Pitchers: PHI – Jackson (7 2/3)), Williams (1 1/3) ATL – Smoltz (6 1/3), Mercker (2/3), Wohlers (2)
Attendance: 52,032 Time: 3:33

=== Game 5 ===
October 11: Atlanta–Fulton County Stadium in Atlanta

Team	1	2	3	4	5	6	7	8	9	10	R	H	E
Philadelphia	1	0	0	1	0	0	0	0	1	1	4	6	1
Atlanta	0	0	0	0	0	0	0	0	3	0	3	7	1
W: Mitch Williams (2–0) L: Mark Wohlers (0–1) S: Larry Andersen (1)
HR: PHI – Darren Daulton, Lenny Dykstra ATL – None
Pitchers: PHI – Schilling (8), Williams (1), Andersen (1) ATL – Avery (7), Mercker (1), McMichael (1), Wohlers (1)
Attendance: 52,032 Time: 3:21

=== Game 6 ===
October 13: Veterans Stadium in Philadelphia

Team	1	2	3	4	5	6	7	8	9	R	H	E
Atlanta	0	0	0	0	1	0	2	0	0	3	5	3
Philadelphia	0	0	2	0	2	2	0	0	X	6	7	1
W: Tommy Greene (1–1) L: Greg Maddux (1–1); S: Mitch Williams (2)
HR: ATL – Jeff Blauser PHI – Dave Hollins
Pitchers: ATL – Maddux (5 2/3), Mercker (1/3), McMichael (2/3), Wohlers (1 1/3) PHI – Greene (7), West (1), Williams (1)
Attendance: 62,502 Time: 3:04

== Award winners ==
- David Justice, OF, Silver Slugger
- Greg Maddux, National League Cy Young Award
- Greg Maddux, Pitcher of the Month, August
- Greg Maddux, P, Gold Glove
- Greg Maddux, The Sporting News Pitcher of the Year Award
- Fred McGriff, 1B, Silver Slugger

1993 Major League Baseball All-Star Game

== Farm system ==
Level	Team	League	Manager
AAA	Richmond Braves	International League	Grady Little
AA	Greenville Braves	Southern League	Bruce Kimm
A	Durham Bulls	Carolina League	Leon Roberts
A	Macon Braves	South Atlantic League	Randy Ingle
Rookie	Danville Braves	Appalachian League	Bruce Benedict
Rookie	GCL Braves	Gulf Coast League	Jim Saul
Rookie	Idaho Falls Braves	Pioneer League	Paul Runge
