= 1993 National League Championship Series =

25th edition of Major League Baseball's National League Championship Series

| Team (Wins) | Managers | Season |
|---|---|---|
| Philadelphia Phillies (4) | Jim Fregosi | 97–65, .599, GA: 3 |
| Atlanta Braves (2) | Bobby Cox | 104–58, .642, GA: 1 |
- Dates: October 6–13
- MVP: Curt Schilling (Philadelphia)
- Umpires: Bruce Froemming; Frank Pulli; Terry Tata; Jim Quick; Jerry Crawford; Joe West

Broadcast
- Television: CBS
- TV announcers: Sean McDonough and Tim McCarver
- Radio: CBS
- Radio announcers: Jerry Coleman and Johnny Bench

The 1993 National League Championship Series was a best-of-seven semifinal series in Major League Baseball’s 1993 postseason played between the Philadelphia Phillies and Atlanta Braves. The Phillies stunned the 104-win Braves, who were bidding for their third consecutive World Series appearance, and won the NLCS, 4–2.

The Phillies would go on to lose to the Toronto Blue Jays in the World Series in six games.

== Background ==
The Phillies, led by outfielder Lenny Dykstra and pitcher Curt Schilling, had gone from worst-to-first, fending off a hard-charging Montreal Expos team in late September, to win the division title with a 97–65 record, and continue the Pennsylvania reign of NL East championships by the Phillies and the Pittsburgh Pirates, their in-state rivals during the early 1990s. The Braves, who had advanced to the World Series each of the past two seasons, won their division race over the 103–59 San Francisco Giants, finishing with a franchise-best 104–58 record. The heavily favored and playoff-seasoned Braves brought their legendary pitching rotation of Cy Young winner Greg Maddux, Tom Glavine, John Smoltz, and Steve Avery into the NLCS with them.

== Summary ==
After Philadelphia edged Atlanta in an exciting Game 1 that went into extra innings, the Braves hammered the Phillies in the next two games to a take a 2–1 series lead. However, the Braves' bats suddenly fell silent and the Phillies rebounded by winning close contests in the final two games in Atlanta to send the series back to Veterans Stadium with Philadelphia on top three games to two. The Phillies took Game 6 by a score of 6–3, sending them to their first World Series appearance in ten years.

=== Philadelphia Phillies vs. Atlanta Braves ===
Philadelphia won the series, 4–2.

| Game | Date | Score | Location | Time | Attendance |
|---|---|---|---|---|---|
| 1 | October 6 | Atlanta Braves – 3, Philadelphia Phillies – 4 (10) | Veterans Stadium | 3:33 | 62,012 |
| 2 | October 7 | Atlanta Braves – 14, Philadelphia Phillies – 3 | Veterans Stadium | 3:14 | 62,436 |
| 3 | October 9 | Philadelphia Phillies – 4, Atlanta Braves – 9 | Atlanta–Fulton County Stadium | 2:44 | 52,032 |
| 4 | October 10 | Philadelphia Phillies – 2, Atlanta Braves – 1 | Atlanta–Fulton County Stadium | 3:33 | 52,032 |
| 5 | October 11 | Philadelphia Phillies – 4, Atlanta Braves – 3 (10) | Atlanta–Fulton County Stadium | 3:21 | 52,032 |
| 6 | October 13 | Atlanta Braves – 3, Philadelphia Phillies – 6 | Veterans Stadium | 3:04 | 62,502 |

== Game summaries ==
=== Game 1 ===
Wednesday, October 6, 1993, at Veterans Stadium in Philadelphia, Pennsylvania

| Team | 1 | 2 | 3 | 4 | 5 | 6 | 7 | 8 | 9 | 10 | R | H | E |
|---|---|---|---|---|---|---|---|---|---|---|---|---|---|
| Atlanta | 0 | 0 | 1 | 1 | 0 | 0 | 0 | 0 | 1 | 0 | 3 | 9 | 0 |
| Philadelphia | 1 | 0 | 0 | 1 | 0 | 1 | 0 | 0 | 0 | 1 | 4 | 9 | 1 |
WP: Mitch Williams (1–0) LP: Greg McMichael (0–1); Home runs: ATL: None; PHI: Pete Incaviglia (1)

Curt Schilling began the series spectacularly by striking out the first five hitters he faced. The Phillies struck first in the bottom of the first on John Kruk's RBI forceout off Steve Avery with runners on first and third, but the Braves tied the game in the third on back-to-back two-out doubles by Avery and Otis Nixon. Next inning, after a leadoff walk and single, David Justice's sacrifice fly put the Braves up 2–1, but Pete Incaviglia's home run in the bottom of the inning tied the game. The game would be back and forth and low-scoring. In the sixth, Philadelphia loaded the bases with one out on two walks and a double when a wild pitch by Avery give them to a 3–2 lead. In the top of the ninth, after a leadoff walk to Bill Pecota off Mitch Williams, third baseman Kim Batiste's errant throw to first on Mark Lemke's groundball put runners on first and third with no out. After a sacrifice bunt, Nixon's groundout tied the game, forcing extra innings. In the bottom of the tenth, after a one-out double by Kruk off Greg McMichael, Batiste lined a double just beyond the reach of Atlanta third baseman Terry Pendleton to score the winning run. Schilling finished the game with eight innings pitched and ten strikeouts in the no-decision.

=== Game 2 ===
Thursday, October 7, 1993, at Veterans Stadium in Philadelphia, Pennsylvania

| Team | 1 | 2 | 3 | 4 | 5 | 6 | 7 | 8 | 9 | R | H | E |
|---|---|---|---|---|---|---|---|---|---|---|---|---|
| Atlanta | 2 | 0 | 6 | 0 | 1 | 0 | 0 | 4 | 1 | 14 | 16 | 0 |
| Philadelphia | 0 | 0 | 0 | 2 | 0 | 0 | 0 | 0 | 1 | 3 | 7 | 2 |
WP: Greg Maddux (1–0) LP: Tommy Greene (0–1); Home runs: ATL: Fred McGriff (1), Jeff Blauser (1), Damon Berryhill (1), Terry Pendleton (1); PHI: Dave Hollins (1), Lenny Dykstra (1)

The Braves offense crushed Phillies starter Tommy Greene in Game 2. An upper deck two-run home run by Fred McGriff gave Atlanta a 2–0 first inning lead. In the third, Jeff Blauser's one-out home run extended their lead to 3–0. After a double, single and walk loaded the bases, Terry Pendleton's two-run single made it 5–0 Braves and knock Greene out of the game. Damon Berryhill's three-run home run off Bobby Thigpen made it 8–0 Braves. Greg Maddux gave up just two runs (on Dave Hollins's two-run home run in the fourth) in seven innings. Pendleton's home run in the fifth off Ben Rivera made it 9–2 Braves. In the eighth, with two on via a single and error, Otis Nixon's RBI single made it 10–2 Braves off David West. After another single loaded the bases, Ron Gant cleared them with a double. In the ninth, Sid Bream singled with two outs off Larry Andersen and scored on Nixon's double. Mike Stanton pitched a scoreless eighth and Mark Wohlers allowed a home run to Lenny Dykstra in the ninth as the Braves' 14–3 win tied the series heading south to Atlanta.

=== Game 3 ===
Saturday, October 9, 1993, at Atlanta–Fulton County Stadium in Atlanta, Georgia

| Team | 1 | 2 | 3 | 4 | 5 | 6 | 7 | 8 | 9 | R | H | E |
|---|---|---|---|---|---|---|---|---|---|---|---|---|
| Philadelphia | 0 | 0 | 0 | 1 | 0 | 1 | 0 | 1 | 1 | 4 | 10 | 1 |
| Atlanta | 0 | 0 | 0 | 0 | 0 | 5 | 4 | 0 | X | 9 | 12 | 0 |
WP: Tom Glavine (1–0) LP: Terry Mulholland (0–1); Home runs: PHI: John Kruk (1); ATL: None

The Phillies struck first in Game 3 on back-to-back leadoff triples by Mariano Duncan and John Kruk in the fourth off Tom Glavine. Kurt's home run in the sixth extended their lead to 2–0, but Glavine allowed no other runs in seven innings pitched. Terry Mulholland pitched five shutout innings before the Braves' offense erupted in the sixth. After a leadoff single and walk, consecutive RBI singles by Fred McGriff and Terry Pendleton tied the game. David Justice's two-run double then put the Braves up 4–2. Roger Mason relieved Mulholland and second baseman Duncan's error on Mark Lemke's ground ball allowed another run to score to make it 5–2 Braves. Next inning, Pendleton's single with two on off Larry Andersen made it 6–2 Braves. David West then allowed a two-out walk to load the bases before Lemke's bases-clearing double made it 9–2 Braves. In the top of the eighth, Duncan tripled with one out off Kent Mercker and scored on Kruk's groundout. Next inning, Greg McMichael allowed a one-out double, single and RBI double to Jim Eisenreich before retiring the next two batters to end the game as the Braves took a 2–1 series lead with a 9–4 win.

=== Game 4 ===
Sunday, October 10, 1993, at Atlanta–Fulton County Stadium in Atlanta, Georgia

| Team | 1 | 2 | 3 | 4 | 5 | 6 | 7 | 8 | 9 | R | H | E |
|---|---|---|---|---|---|---|---|---|---|---|---|---|
| Philadelphia | 0 | 0 | 0 | 2 | 0 | 0 | 0 | 0 | 0 | 2 | 8 | 1 |
| Atlanta | 0 | 1 | 0 | 0 | 0 | 0 | 0 | 0 | 0 | 1 | 10 | 1 |
WP: Danny Jackson (1–0) LP: John Smoltz (0–1) Sv: Mitch Williams (1)

John Smoltz and Danny Jackson faced off in a close Game 4. The Braves took an early 1–0 lead on a Mark Lemke double in the second with two on, but the Phillies went on top in the fourth inning with two unearned runs. Darren Daulton reached on Lemke's error, then moved to third on Milt Thompson's double. After Kevin Stocker's sacrifice fly tied the game, starter Jackson hit the go-ahead RBI single. Atlanta had baserunners throughout the rest of the game, but could not get a clutch hit as the Phillies hung on to win 2–1. Phillies closer Mitch Williams allowed the first two runners to reach in the ninth, but a double play groundout by Ron Gant helped him get out of it and earn the save. The Phillies left 15 runners on, going 1 for 11 with them in scoring position, while the Braves stranded 11, going 1 for 15 with them in scoring position.

=== Game 5 ===
Monday, October 11, 1993, at Atlanta–Fulton County Stadium in Atlanta, Georgia

| Team | 1 | 2 | 3 | 4 | 5 | 6 | 7 | 8 | 9 | 10 | R | H | E |
|---|---|---|---|---|---|---|---|---|---|---|---|---|---|
| Philadelphia | 1 | 0 | 0 | 1 | 0 | 0 | 0 | 0 | 1 | 1 | 4 | 6 | 1 |
| Atlanta | 0 | 0 | 0 | 0 | 0 | 0 | 0 | 0 | 3 | 0 | 3 | 7 | 1 |
WP: Mitch Williams (2–0) LP: Mark Wohlers (0–1) Sv: Larry Andersen (1); Home runs: PHI: Darren Daulton (1), Lenny Dykstra (2); ATL: None

With the series tied 2–2, the Phillies and Braves needed extra innings to decide Game 5. Philadelphia got on the board in the first off Steve Avery when Mariano Duncan singled and John Kruk doubled down the right field line. In the bottom of the first, the Braves missed a chance to score when Fred McGriff hit one off the top of the right field fence sending Jeff Blauser racing around third to try to score. However, Wes Chamberlain fielded the carom cleanly, threw to shortstop Kevin Stocker, who then relayed the ball home to nail Blauser. In the fourth the Phils went up 2–0 on Chamberlain's sacrifice fly which scored Pete Incaviglia who had reached on a three base error committed by Ron Gant. Meanwhile, Curt Schilling was again lights out, tossing nine strikeouts. In the top of the ninth, a seemingly inconsequential insurance run scored when Darren Daulton homered off Greg McMichael.

However, up 3–0 entering the bottom of the ninth, trouble brewed on the horizon. Schilling walked Blauser to open the frame. Then Gant hit a sharp grounder to third which Kim Batiste booted for his second key error of the series. Mitch Williams was again asked to relieve Schilling, who would take a seat in the dugout peeking in through a towel at the beleaguered closer. The first batter Williams faced, McGriff, roped an RBI single past Duncan sending Blauser home and Gant to third. David Justice then hit a sacrifice fly to left scoring Gant which cut the lead to 3–2. Terry Pendleton followed with a bullet past the mound and '92 LCS hero Francisco Cabrera chopped a ball up the middle that skipped past Stocker's glove to tie the game at 3–3. With one out and Pendleton taking third on the Cabrera hit, the series was hanging in the balance with the Braves 90 feet (27 m) away from victory. The next batter Mark Lemke lined a shot down the left field line that looked to be a game-ending base hit for Atlanta. The crowd at Fulton County Stadium screamed and then sighed as the ball veered foul at the last second. Williams regrouped to strikeout Lemke and got Bill Pecota on a flyout to hold the game even.

In the tenth, Lenny Dykstra vaulted Philadelphia back into the lead when he drilled a full count Mark Wohlers fastball over the fence in dead center field. 40-year-old Larry Andersen then came on in the bottom half to retire the Braves in order, closing out the 4–3 nail biter. The victory put the Phillies up 3–2 going back to the Vet.

Game 5 also happened to be the final afternoon League Championship Series game to be played on Columbus Day, which became a regular occurrence after the LCS expanded to being a best-of-seven contest in 1985.

=== Game 6 ===
Wednesday, October 13, 1993, at Veterans Stadium in Philadelphia, Pennsylvania

| Team | 1 | 2 | 3 | 4 | 5 | 6 | 7 | 8 | 9 | R | H | E |
|---|---|---|---|---|---|---|---|---|---|---|---|---|
| Atlanta | 0 | 0 | 0 | 0 | 1 | 0 | 2 | 0 | 0 | 3 | 5 | 3 |
| Philadelphia | 0 | 0 | 2 | 0 | 2 | 2 | 0 | 0 | X | 6 | 7 | 1 |
WP: Tommy Greene (1–1) LP: Greg Maddux (1–1) Sv: Mitch Williams (2); Home runs: ATL: Jeff Blauser (2); PHI: Dave Hollins (2)

Trying to force a Game 7, the Braves sent their ace, Greg Maddux to the mound in Game 6. However, a very hard-hit Mickey Morandini line drive in the first inning hit Maddux in the leg. He suffered what was described the following inning as a deep tissue bruise. He stayed in the game, but his effectiveness was clearly compromised by the injury. Darren Daulton hit a bases-loaded two-run double in the third. After the Braves got on the board in the fifth on Jeff Blauser's RBI single with two on off Tommy Greene, Dave Hollins connected for a two-run home run in the bottom of the inning, putting Philadelphia on top 4–1. Morandini's two-run triple in the sixth finally chased Maddux, who later refused to make any excuses for his subpar performance but when directly asked about it, he did acknowledge that he had been pitching in pain from the line drive he took off his calf in the 1st inning. Blauser hit a two-run home run in the seventh to make it 6–3 Phillies, but David West and Mitch Williams finished the Braves with a perfect eighth and ninth, respectively. It was their first pennant in 10 years.

Although he did not get any decisions during his two appearances in the six-game series, Curt Schilling's 1.69 ERA and 19 strikeouts were still enough to earn him the 1993 NLCS Most Valuable Player Award. Schilling became the only pitcher in major league history to be named a postseason series MVP (League Championship Series or World Series) without either a pitching decision or a save, as of 2025.

== Composite box ==
1993 NLCS (4–2): Philadelphia Phillies over Atlanta Braves

| Team | 1 | 2 | 3 | 4 | 5 | 6 | 7 | 8 | 9 | 10 | R | H | E |
|---|---|---|---|---|---|---|---|---|---|---|---|---|---|
| Philadelphia Phillies | 2 | 0 | 2 | 7 | 2 | 4 | 0 | 1 | 3 | 2 | 23 | 47 | 7 |
| Atlanta Braves | 2 | 1 | 7 | 1 | 2 | 5 | 6 | 4 | 5 | 0 | 33 | 59 | 5 |
Total attendance: 343,046 Average attendance: 57,174

== Aftermath ==
Despite having been exceptional for the Phillies in NLCS, Mitch Williams self-imploded during the World Series. Williams earned a save in Game 2 of the series, relieving Terry Mulholland as the Phillies tied the series at a game each. However, Williams suffered the loss in Game 4, the highest-scoring game in World Series history, as the Blue Jays scored six times in the eighth inning to earn a 15–14 victory and take a 3–1 series lead. Afterwards, Williams received death threats from angry Phillies fans for blowing the game. After the Phillies won Game 5 in a complete-game shutout by Curt Schilling, the series returned to Toronto for Game 6. The Phillies scored five runs in the seventh inning to take a 6–5 lead, and it was up to Williams to preserve the victory and force a Game 7. With one out and two runners on base in the bottom of the ninth inning, Joe Carter hit a 2–2 pitch over the left-field wall for a walk-off home run, giving the Blue Jays an 8–6 victory and a World Series championship.

Owners and the MLBPA agreed to realign by changing the divisional format starting in 1994, with the creation of a third division in each 14-team league. This in turn led to the creation of another round of postseason play, the Division Series and the addition of a wild card; meaning for the first time ever, a team did not have to win their division to qualify for the postseason. The Braves would end their 24-year stay in the National League West, move to the National League East, and form a divisional rivalry with the Phillies.

The ‘93 Phillies proved to be one-hit wonders, as 1993 was the lone year the Phillies posted a winning record in the 1990s. Meanwhile, the Braves continued their dominance of the National League in the remaining years of the 1990s, winning pennants in 1995 (and the 1995 World Series), 1996, and 1999. However, the Braves did not win another pennant until 2021, while the Phillies had their own run of dominance from 2007 to 2011, which included two consecutive World Series appearances in 2008 and 2009. They beat the Tampa Bay Rays, an expansion team not formed until 1998, in five games in 2008, and lost to the Yankees in six games in 2009.

The Phillies and Braves met in the postseason again in 2022 and 2023, with the Phillies winning both NLDS matchups in four games. The teams met a fourth time in the 2026 National League Wild Card Series, which the Braves won in three games. This was the first time that the Braves defeated the Phillies in a postseason series.
