= Bienvenida =

Bienvenida may refer to:

- Bienvenida, Spain, a municipality in Extremadura
- Bienvenida (given name), a Spanish given name
- Bienvenida, a song by Fuerza Regida on the album Pa Las Baby's y Belikeada
- Bienvenida, a song by Selena Gomez, part of Emilia Pérez (soundtrack)

== See also ==
- Bienvenido (disambiguation)
