= Bienvenido =

Bienvenido or bienvenidos may refer to:

== Entertainment ==
- Bienvenidos (album), a 2006 album by Cabezones
- Bienvenidos (Chilean TV series), a Chilean morning show
- "Bienvenido" (song), Spanish version of the 2011 song "Benvenuto" by Laura Pausini
- Bienvenidos (Venezuelan TV series), Venezuelan sketch comedy television show
- La historia de Bienvenido (Bienvenido's Story), a 1964 Spanish children's movie
- Bienvenido-Welcome, a 1994 film by Mexican director Gabriel Retes
- Bienvenido (TV program), an annual television special that airs every New Year's Eve on Telemundo

== People ==
- Bienvenido Abante (born 1951), Filipino politician and pastor
- Bienvenido Cedeño (born 1969), Panamanian baseball player
- Bienvenido Fabián (1920–2000), Dominican composer active in the 1930s
- Bienvenido Fajemolin, Filipino trooper who received the Medal of Valor
- Bienvenido Granda (1915–1983), Cuban vocalist and musician
- Bienvenido Jiménez (1890–?), Cuban baseball player
- Bienvenido Lumbera (1932–2021), Filipino poet, critic and dramatist
- Bienvenido Marañón (born 1986), Spanish footballer
- Bienvenido Zacu Mborobainchi (born 1956), Bolivian politician
- Bienvenido Nebres (born 1940), Filipino scientist, mathematician, and Jesuit
- Bienvenido Noriega Jr. (1952–1994), Filipino playwright
- Bienvenido Reyes (born 1947), Filipino judge
- Bienvenido Rivera (born 1968), Dominican baseball player
- Bienvenido Santos (1911–1996), Filipino-American writer
- Hector Bienvenido Trujillo (1908–2002), Dominican general and president of the Dominican Republic 1952–1960
- Jacinto Bienvenido Peynado (1878–1940), president of the Dominican Republic 1938–1940

== Places ==
- Bienvenido, Puebla, municipal seat of Hermenegildo Galeana, a municipality in Puebla, Mexico

== See also ==
- Bienvenida (disambiguation)
