= Bill Pecota =

American baseball player (born 1960)

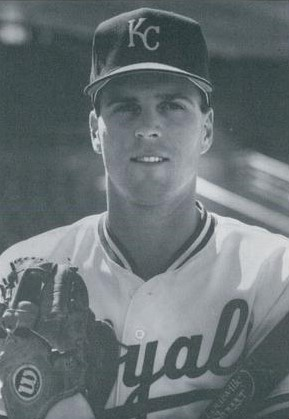
- Infielder
- Born: February 16, 1960 (age 66); Redwood City, California, U.S.
- Batted: Right Threw: Right

MLB debut
- September 19, 1986, for the Kansas City Royals

Last MLB appearance
- August 11, 1994, for the Atlanta Braves

MLB statistics
- Batting average: .249
- Home runs: 22
- Runs batted in: 148
- Stats at Baseball Reference

Teams
- Kansas City Royals (1986–1991); New York Mets (1992); Atlanta Braves (1993–1994)

William Joseph Pecota (born February 16, 1960) is an American former Major League Baseball infielder. He is the namesake of PECOTA, a sabermetric created by Nate Silver and owned by Baseball Prospectus.

== Early years ==
Pecota attended Peterson High School in Sunnyvale, California. He was drafted by the Kansas City Royals in the tenth round of the 1981 January draft after playing at De Anza College in Cupertino, California. He batted .253 with 31 home runs and 267 runs batted in over six seasons in the Royals' farm system when he debuted with the Royals in September 1986.

== Kansas City Royals ==
Pecota accomplished the rare feat of getting his first major league RBI before his first major league hit. On September 22, in his sixth plate appearance, he drove in Jim Sundberg with a sacrifice fly. On September 25, he doubled off Frank Viola for his first major league hit.

He started the 1987 season with the Omaha Royals but was up in the majors by the end of April. He went back-to-back with Bo Jackson on May 8 for his first major league home run. Despite going 4-for-4 in the last game of his three-week stint in the majors to raise his season average to .556, Pecota was optioned back to Triple-A in mid-May. He was immediately recalled when third baseman George Brett went on the disabled list. He made a third trip to Omaha in late June, prompting the nickname "I-29" by his teammates, as Omaha is a short drive up Interstate 29 from Kansas City. Overall, he batted .276 with three home runs, 14 RBIs and 22 runs scored backing up second, third and shortstop for the Royals. At the other end of I-29, he batted .310 with two home runs and 16 RBIs.

Despite spending most of the 1988 season with a below .200 batting average, Pecota spent the entire season in the majors, thanks to his ability to play multiple positions well. He made debuts at first and both corner outfield positions, and actually caught an inning. A modest nine game hitting streak in late August brought his average over .200.

Pecota once again spent the 1989 season going back and forth up I-29. He made his debut in centerfield, leaving pitcher as the only position on the field he never played. In the first game of a July 19 doubleheader with the New York Yankees, Pecota had his only career two home run game. He homered again in the second game, accounting for all three home runs he would hit for the season, and four of his five RBIs.

Pecota appeared in three games as a defensive replacement before he was optioned back to Omaha to start the 1990 season. He was recalled in early June and had only logged three at bats when he had a 4-for-4 game against the California Angels. His hot hitting continued through the month of June, and with Royals legend Frank White in the final season of his 18-year career, Pecota began seeing more playing time at second base. For the season, he batted .242 with five home runs and 20 RBIs.

Pecota saw limited playing time in 1991 until an injury to Kevin Seitzer thrust him into the starting third base job. He batted .253 with two home runs and 13 RBIs filling in for Seitzer. Upon Seitzer's return in late May, Pecota returned to his backup role. This backup role included a relief appearance, adding Pecota to the list of big leaguers to play all nine positions plus designated hitter at one time or another during his big league career. In early July, manager Hal McRae decided to replace Seitzer at third with Pecota permanently. The Royals were 35-44 and in last place in the American League West at the time of the change. They went 47-36 the rest of the way to finish the season in second place. For his part, Pecota batted .286 with a career best six home runs and 45 RBIs in a career-high 125 games.

== New York Mets ==
At the Winter meetings, he was part of a blockbuster deal in which he and two-time Cy Young Award winner Bret Saberhagen were traded to the New York Mets for Gregg Jefferies, Kevin McReynolds and Keith Miller.

Pecota's versatility came in handy with his new franchise as well, as he appeared in 117 games backing up all four infield positions. He also pitched an inning for the Mets, making him the first position player to pitch in franchise history.

The 1992 Mets were a disappointment that lost 90 games. After one season with the team dubbed "The worst team money could buy," Pecota signed as a free agent with the Atlanta Braves.

== Atlanta Braves ==
In 65 plate appearances, Pecota batted .323 for the 104-win Braves. Backing up Mark Lemke, Terry Pendleton and David Justice, Pecota logged 80.2 innings on the field without committing an error. He reached the post season for the only time in his career. In the 1993 National League Championship Series against the Philadelphia Phillies, Pecota went 1-for-3 with a run scored in game one.

In 1994, Pecota saw most of his playing time at third base, though he almost earned a third opportunity to pitch. In a 15-inning marathon with the Phillies, manager Bobby Cox had used all of his position players. Had the game gone on to a 16th inning, his intention was to use starting pitcher John Smoltz in left field and have Pecota pitch. Instead, relief pitcher Mike Stanton successfully bunted Deion Sanders home from third with the winning run to end the game. They were 68-46, six games back in the National League East when the player strike ended the season and ended Pecota's chance of making the post season a second time.

== Career statistics ==
Games	PA	AB	Runs	Hits	2B	3B	HR	RBI	SB	BB	SO	Avg.	OBP	OPS	Fld%	IP	ERA	WAR
698	1729	1527	223	380	72	11	22	148	52	160	216	.249	.323	.676	.979	3.0	6.00	9.1

== See also ==
- PECOTA, the Baseball Prospectus forecasting system named after Pecota.
