= Benvenida =

Benvenida is a feminine given name. Notable people with the name include:

- Benvenida Abrabanel, Jewish philanthropist and banker-businesswoman in Italy
- Benvenida Cohen Belmonte (fl. c. 1720), British Jewish poet

== See also ==
- Bienvenida (name)
