= Tony Longmire =

American baseball player

- Outfielder
- Born: August 12, 1968 (age 57); Vallejo, California, U.S.
- Batted: Left Threw: Right

MLB debut
- September 3, 1993, for the Philadelphia Phillies

Last MLB appearance
- August 6, 1995, for the Philadelphia Phillies

MLB statistics
- Batting average: .285
- Home runs: 3
- Runs batted in: 37
- Stats at Baseball Reference

Teams
- Philadelphia Phillies (1993–1995)

Anthony Eugene Longmire (born August 12, 1968) is an American former professional baseball player. He was an outfielder in Major League Baseball (MLB) from 1993 to 1995. He played for the Philadelphia Phillies.

== Biography ==
Longmire graduated from Dr. James J. Hogan High School. He was drafted by the Pittsburgh Pirates in the 8th round of the 1986 Major League Baseball draft. He began his career with the Pittsburgh Pirates and was traded to the Philadelphia Phillies organization in 1990.
