= Larry Andersen =

American baseball player and analyst (born 1953)

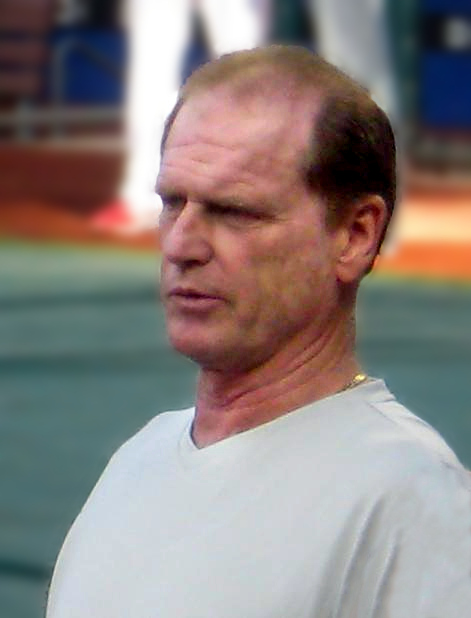
- Andersen at Citizens Bank Park in Philadelphia in 2010
- Pitcher
- Born: May 6, 1953 (age 73); Portland, Oregon, U.S.
- Batted: Right Threw: Right

MLB debut
- September 5, 1975, for the Cleveland Indians

Last MLB appearance
- July 31, 1994, for the Philadelphia Phillies

MLB statistics
- Win–loss record: 40–39
- Earned run average: 3.15
- Strikeouts: 758
- Stats at Baseball Reference

Teams
- Cleveland Indians (1975, 1977,1979); Seattle Mariners (1981–1982); Philadelphia Phillies (1983–1986); Houston Astros (1986–1990); Boston Red Sox (1990); San Diego Padres (1991–1992); Philadelphia Phillies (1993–1994)

Larry Eugene Andersen (born May 6, 1953) is an American former relief pitcher in Major League Baseball and current radio color commentator for the Philadelphia Phillies. From 1975 through 1994, Andersen played for the Cleveland Indians (1975, 1977, 1979), Seattle Mariners (1981–1982), Philadelphia Phillies (1983–1986, 1993–1994), Houston Astros (1986–1990), Boston Red Sox (1990), and San Diego Padres (1991–1992).

== Playing and coaching career ==
Andersen possessed an average fastball and outstanding slider. He was drafted out of high school in the seventh round (157th overall) of the 1971 Major League Baseball draft by the Cleveland Indians. Andersen made his professional debut that year, posting a record of 1–3 with a 5.31 ERA in 11 games (five starts) with the Gulf Coast League Indians and the Single-A Reno Silver Sox of the California League. He pitched in his first full season for Single-A Reno in 1972, going 4–14 with a 6.53 ERA in 124 innings, with a 1.80 WHIP in 27 games (19 starts).

On September 5, 1975, Andersen made his major league debut for Cleveland, tossing a perfect seventh inning in an 11–2 loss to the Detroit Tigers. In parts of three seasons with Cleveland, he appeared in a combined 22 games, and was 0–1 with a 5.40 ERA.

On December 21, 1979, Andersen was traded to the Pittsburgh Pirates in exchange for John Burden and Larry Littleton. He spent the entire 1980 season with the Triple-A Portland Beavers, going 5–7 with 15 saves and a 1.74 ERA in 52 relief appearances.

After the 1980 season, Andersen was sent to the Seattle Mariners on October 29 as the player to be named later to complete an earlier trade for pitcher Odell Jones. In his first full major league season, Andersen went 3–3 with five saves and a 2.66 ERA in 41 games with the Mariners. However, his numbers took a turn in 1982, as he finished with one save and a 5.99 ERA in 40 relief appearances.

During the 1982 season, Andersen pulled a prank on Mariners manager Rene Lachemann during a series in Chicago. Referred to as the ‘Mr. Jello’ caper, Andersen, along with teammates Richie Zisk and Joe Simpson moved all the furniture in the hotel suite into a bathroom, filled both toilets with jello and removed the mouthpiece from the phone. The trio were not revealed as the culprits until after the season ended.

Andersen spent most of the 1983 season with Triple-A Portland, going 7–8 with 22 saves and a 2.05 ERA in 52 appearances. On July 29, Andersen's contract was sold to the Philadelphia Phillies for future considerations. He was immediately added to the Phillies' roster, and remained with the team for the rest of the season. In 17 games, Andersen was 1–0 with a 2.39 ERA. He pitched in Game 2 and 4 of the 1983 World Series (while Philadelphia lost in five games), pitching two innings each; he allowed a run in Game 2.

In 1984, Andersen became a mainstay in the Phillies' bullpen, and finished with a 3–7 record, four saves and a 2.38 ERA in 64 relief appearances. Andersen began the 1986 season with a 4.26 ERA in 10 games. On May 13, 1986, he was released by the Phillies.

Three days after he was released by the Phillies, Andersen was signed as a free agent by the Houston Astros. On June 23, Andersen was the winning pitcher in a game in which he did not throw a strike to a single batter. While pitching to Cincinnati Reds catcher Bo Díaz in the top of the ninth inning, Andersen threw a wild pitch, and then tagged out Buddy Bell at home plate to end the inning. The Astros went on to win in the bottom of the ninth inning on a two-run home run by Glenn Davis. Andersen appeared in 38 games to end the season, finishing 2–1 with one save and a 2.78 ERA. Andersen also made two appearances during the 1986 NLCS, tossing five scoreless innings.

On December 19, 1986, Andersen re-signed with the Astros as a free agent. In 1987, Andersen arguably had his best season in the majors up to that point. He finished with a record of 9–5, a 3.45 ERA, 94 strikeouts, and 101 2/3 innings pitched in 67 games. He set career highs in wins, innings pitched and strikeouts. In 1989, Andersen recorded a career-low 1.54 ERA in 60 relief appearances, which led National League relievers (minimum 81 innings pitched).

On August 30, 1990, Andersen was traded to the Boston Red Sox for minor league prospect Jeff Bagwell. He made 15 relief appearances for the Red Sox in September, recording one save and a 1.23 ERA. The trade is often regarded as one of the most lopsided trades in baseball history; Andersen spent one month with the Red Sox before becoming a free agent, while Bagwell went on to spend 15 seasons with the Astros and was later inducted into the National Baseball Hall of Fame and Museum in 2017. In the 1990 American League Championship Series, he pitched an inning each in Game 1, 2, and 4. In Game 1, he was summoned in the seventh with the Sox leading 1-0. He gave up a walk and a hit before a flyball to center was deep enough for a sacrifice fly to tie the game. In the eighth, he gave up a leadoff single to José Canseco and was immediately pulled. The next two pitchers (Tom Bolton and Jeff Gray) proceeded to give up the run in the eighth and then seven more in the ninth as the Red Sox lost 9-1 that marked Andersen with the loss. The Athletics won the series in a sweep.

On December 21, 1990, Andersen signed a two-year, $4.35 million contract with the San Diego Padres. In 1991, he was 3–4 with a career-high 13 saves and a 2.30 ERA in 38 relief appearances. In 1992, Andersen was 1–1 with two saves and a 3.34 ERA in 34 relief appearances.

On December 18, 1992, Andersen returned to the Phillies as a free agent, signing a one-year, $700,000 contract. He enjoyed a productive season out of the Phillies bullpen, going 3–2 with a 2.92 ERA in 64 relief appearances. However, Andersen struggled in the postseason, recording a 15.43 ERA in the 1993 NLCS and a 9.82 ERA in the 1993 World Series. On January 18, 1994, he returned to the Phillies on a minor league contract. In his final major league season, Andersen went 1–2 with a 4.41 ERA in 29 relief appearances.

In a 17-season career, Andersen posted a 40–39 record with 49 saves and a 3.15 ERA in 699 games pitched. He is the only member of the Phillies to play in both the 1983 World Series and the 1993 World Series (Darren Daulton had been called up in September 1983, but did not make the post-season roster that year).

In 1995, Andersen was a player/coach for the Reading Phillies after he failed to make the Major League club out of Spring Training. He spent the following two seasons as the pitching coach for the Scranton/Wilkes-Barre Red Barons.

== Philadelphia Phillies broadcasting ==
Andersen joined the Philadelphia Phillies' broadcast team as a color commentator prior to the 1998 season, filling the position left vacant by the death of Richie Ashburn late in the 1997 campaign. Andersen worked on both television and radio from 1998 to 2006 before moving exclusively to radio in 2007. Early in his broadcasting tenure, Andersen occasionally provided television color commentary when the Phillies were featured regionally on Fox Saturday afternoon telecasts. During the 2007 season, he began doing play-by-play work on Phillies radio broadcasts during the fifth and sixth innings, but returned to full-time color commentary in 2008.

In 2012, Andersen was ranked No. 12 on the MLB Network Countdown of the Top 25 personalities in Major League Baseball history.

| Preceded by Richie Ashburn | Philles Baseball commentator (with Harry Kalas); 1998–2006 | Succeeded by Gary Matthews |
