= Bienvenida (given name) =

Bienvenida is a Spanish feminine given name. Notable people with the name include:

- Bienvenida de Sánchez, Paraguayan politician
- Bienvenida Sanz (fl. 1940s–1950s), Spanish film editor

== See also ==
- Benvenida
