= Roger Mason (baseball) =

American baseball player (born 1957)

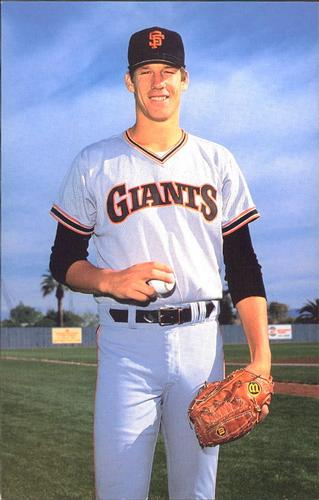
- Pitcher
- Born: September 18, 1957 (age 69); Bellaire, Michigan, U.S.
- Batted: Right Threw: Right

MLB debut
- September 4, 1984, for the Detroit Tigers

Last MLB appearance
- August 11, 1994, for the New York Mets

MLB statistics
- Win–loss record: 22–35
- Earned run average: 4.02
- Strikeouts: 286
- Stats at Baseball Reference

Teams
- Detroit Tigers (1984); San Francisco Giants (1985–1987); Houston Astros (1989); Pittsburgh Pirates (1991–1992); San Diego Padres (1993); Philadelphia Phillies (1993–1994); New York Mets (1994)

Roger Leroy Mason (born September 18, 1957) is an American former professional baseball player who pitched in the Major Leagues primarily in relief from 1984 to 1987, 1989, and 1991–1994.

Mason was a member of the 1984 World Series champion Detroit Tigers, and appeared in the 1993 World Series for the Philadelphia Phillies. He pitched collegiately at Saginaw Valley State University.

In November 2008, Mason was hired as the pitching coach for the Traverse City Beach Bums of the independent Frontier League. In his initial season as coach, the Beach Bums posted the third lowest earned run average in the league.
