= Tommy Greene =

American baseball player (born 1967)

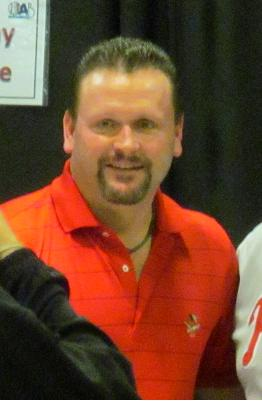
- Greene in 2012
- Pitcher
- Born: April 6, 1967 (age 59); Lumberton, North Carolina, U.S.
- Batted: Right Threw: Right

MLB debut
- September 10, 1989, for the Atlanta Braves

Last MLB appearance
- July 4, 1997, for the Houston Astros

MLB statistics
- Win–loss record: 38–25
- Earned run average: 4.14
- Strikeouts: 461
- Stats at Baseball Reference

Teams
- Atlanta Braves (1989–1990); Philadelphia Phillies (1990–1995); Houston Astros (1997)

Career highlights and awards
- Pitched a no-hitter on May 23, 1991

Ira Thomas Greene (born April 6, 1967) is an American former professional baseball pitcher. He played in Major League Baseball (MLB) for the Atlanta Braves, Philadelphia Phillies, and Houston Astros. He previously served a post-game studio analyst for the Philadelphia Phillies.

== High school ==
Greene played baseball at Whiteville High School in North Carolina where he was teammates with Patrick Lennon and won a state championship. As a sophomore he had a 10–0 record and hit .350. As a senior he hit .490, recorded a 0.07 earned run average and struck out 270 batters in 124 innings. He threw nine total no-hitters in high school.

== Pro career ==
On May 23, 1991, Greene threw a no-hitter for the Phillies against the Montreal Expos. He struck out 10 batters and walked 7. Greene was starting for only the second time in the season and 15th time in his major league career. Greene was pitching in place of Danny Cox who had suffered a pulled groin in his last start. Greene became the first visiting pitcher to hurl a no-hitter in Montreal's history as the Phillies defeated the Expos, 2–0 before an Olympic Stadium crowd of 8,833.

Unfortunately for Greene the next year in 1992, tendonitis in his arm and shoulder caused him to miss 3 1/2 months of the season; he appeared in only 13 games.

His best year as a pitcher was in 1993 as a member of the Phillies. He had a record of 16–4, tied with Curt Schilling for the most wins with that club. He started Game 2 and 6 of the 1993 National League Championship Series against the Atlanta Braves. He was chased out early in a rout loss in Game 2 but bounced back with seven solid innings in the latter that saw Philadelphia win its first pennant in ten years. Later that same season, he started Game 4 of the 1993 World Series for the Phillies against the Toronto Blue Jays, but he allowed seven runs before being taken out in the third inning in what became a see-saw 15-14 loss; the Phillies lost the Series in six games while Greene never pitched in a postseason game again.

His shoulder never completely healed. Greene started only 19 games in the big leagues from the 1994 season until he left the game in 1997.

Greene was a GM of the Southern Collegiate baseball team, the Monroe Channel Cats, and also maintains a real estate business.

== See also ==
- List of Major League Baseball no-hitters

== Notes ==
Preceded by Nolan Ryan	No-hitter pitcher May 23, 1991	Succeeded by Bob Milacki, Mike Flanagan, Mark Williamson, & Gregg Olson
