= Wes Chamberlain =

American baseball player (born 1966)

- Outfielder
- Born: April 13, 1966 (age 60); Chicago, Illinois, U.S.
- Batted: Right Threw: Right

Professional debut
- MLB: August 31, 1990, for the Philadelphia Phillies
- NPB: June 15, 1996, for the Chiba Lotte Marines

Last appearance
- MLB: June 7, 1995, for the Boston Red Sox
- NPB: October 6, 1996, for the Chiba Lotte Marines

MLB statistics
- Batting average: .255
- Home runs: 43
- Runs batted in: 167

NPB statistics
- Batting average: .253
- Home runs: 11
- Runs batted in: 38
- Stats at Baseball Reference

Teams
- Philadelphia Phillies (1990–1994); Boston Red Sox (1994–1995); Chiba Lotte Marines (1996)

Wesley Polk Chamberlain (born April 13, 1966) is an American former professional baseball right fielder/left fielder. He played all or parts of six seasons in Major League Baseball (MLB), from 1990 through 1995, for the Philadelphia Phillies (1990–95) and Boston Red Sox (1995). He also played one season in Nippon Professional Baseball (NPB), for the Chiba Lotte Marines (1996). During Chamberlain's playing days, he stood 6 ft 2 in (1.88 m), weighing 210 pounds (95 kg; 15 st); he batted and threw right-handed.

== Career ==
A 4th round pick in the 1987 draft, Chamberlain, who played high school baseball at Neal F. Simeon H.S. in Chicago, was signed by the Pittsburgh Pirates out of the Jackson State University. In 1990, he was sent by Pittsburgh to Philadelphia in the same transaction that brought Carmelo Martínez to the Pirates. His most productive season came in 1991 with the Phillies, when he posted career-highs in home runs (13), RBI (50), runs (51), hits (92), stolen bases (9) and games played (101), including three four-hit games. The effort earned him the 5th place in the NL Rookie of the Year Award vote. He also appeared in the 1993 World Series, won by the Toronto Blue Jays in six games. During the 1994 midseason, he was sent by Philadelphia to Boston in exchange for Paul Quantrill and Billy Hatcher.

In a six-season career, Chamberlain was a .255 hitter with 43 home runs and 167 RBI in 385 games. After that, he was signed by the Japan's Chiba Lotte Marines in 1996.

Following his major league career, Chamberlain played for a number of independent league teams, including the Gary SouthShore RailCats and Winnipeg Goldeyes of the Northern League, being selected an All-Star in 2000 and 2003.
