= Darren Daulton =

American baseball player (1962–2017)

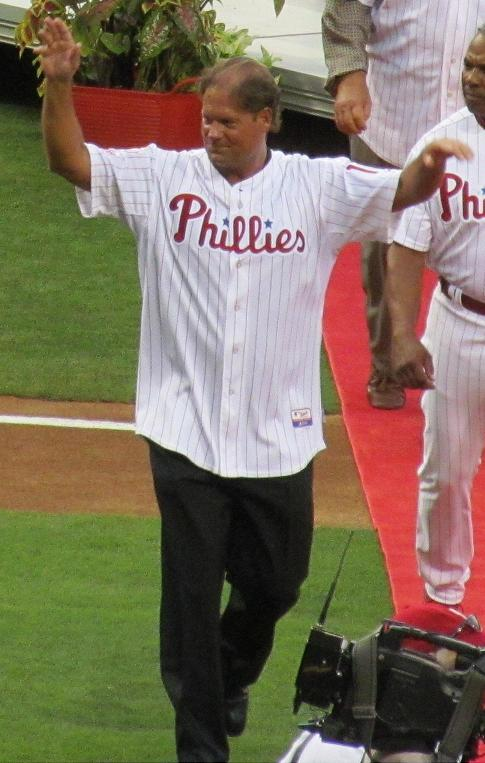
- Daulton in 2012
- Catcher
- Born: January 3, 1962; Arkansas City, Kansas, U.S.
- Died: August 6, 2017 (aged 55); Clearwater, Florida, U.S.
- Batted: Left Threw: Right

MLB debut
- September 25, 1983, for the Philadelphia Phillies

Last MLB appearance
- September 28, 1997, for the Florida Marlins

MLB statistics
- Batting average: .245
- Home runs: 137
- Runs batted in: 588
- Stats at Baseball Reference

Teams
- Philadelphia Phillies (1983, 1985–1997); Florida Marlins (1997)

Career highlights and awards
- 3× All-Star (1992, 1993, 1995); World Series champion (1997); Silver Slugger Award (1992); NL RBI leader (1992); Philadelphia Phillies Wall of Fame

Darren Arthur Daulton (January 3, 1962 – August 6, 2017), nicknamed "Dutch", was an American professional baseball catcher who played in Major League Baseball (MLB) for the Philadelphia Phillies (1983, 1985–1997) and Florida Marlins (1997). While with the Phillies, Daulton was a three-time MLB All-Star and won the 1992 Silver Slugger Award. He won the 1997 World Series with the Marlins.

== Professional career ==
=== Philadelphia Phillies ===
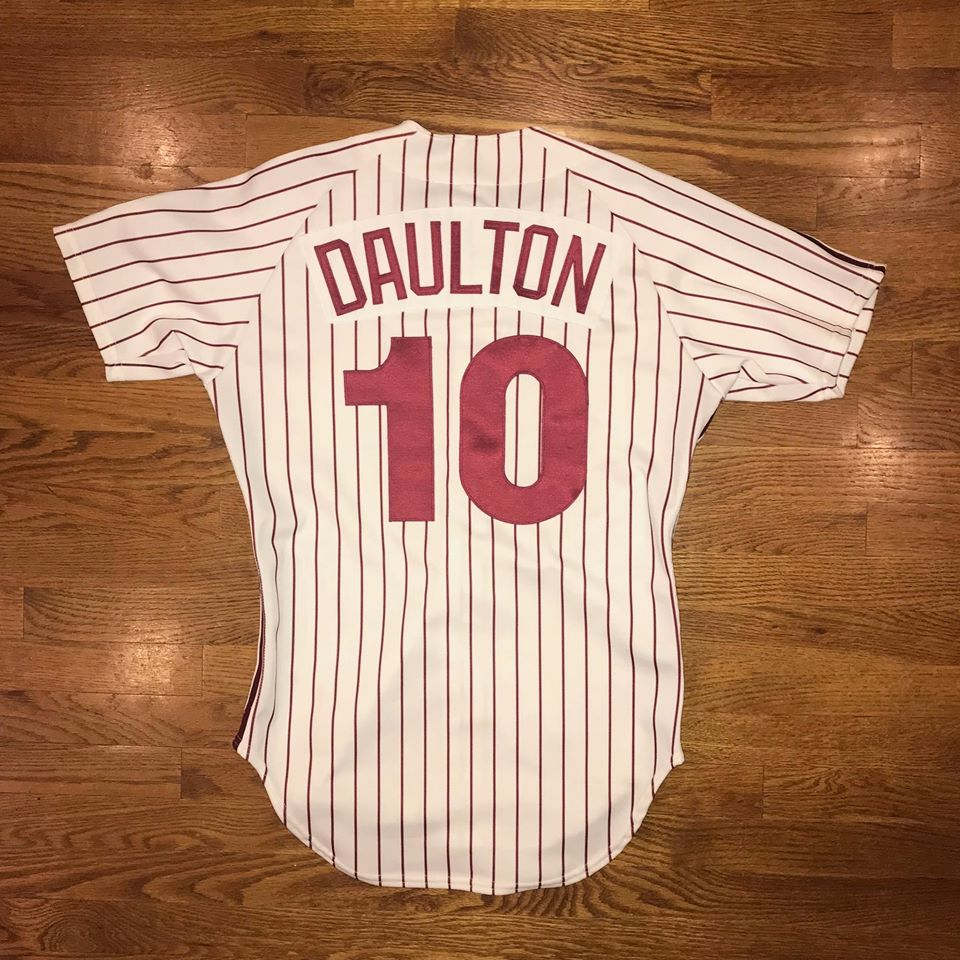
1988 Philadelphia Phillies #10 Darren Daulton home jersey

The Philadelphia Phillies selected Daulton in the 25th round of the 1980 Major League Baseball draft. On September 25, 1983, he made his major league debut for the Phillies. Daulton had three at bats for the Phillies in 1983. Through 1988, he played sparingly, due chiefly to the presence of all-star catchers Ozzie Virgil Jr. and Lance Parrish. Daulton became the Phillies' full-time catcher in 1989. Throughout his early career, his primary value to the team was as a defensive catcher — his cumulative batting average of .206, through the 1988 season, was barely above the Mendoza Line — and he never appeared in as many as 60 games, in any single season. Daulton's breakout season was 1990, his first as his team's primary backstop; that year, he batted .268, with 57 runs batted in (RBI) — which, when coupled with his skills behind the plate, earned him a three-year contract worth $6.75 million. Daulton caught Terry Mulholland's no-hitter, on August 15, 1990.

Following a slump in 1991 that saw his batting average fall below .200, Daulton led the National League (NL) in RBIs for 1992 with 109. He also finished in the top 10 in on-base percentage, slugging percentage, OPS, home runs, walks, runs created, and extra base hits. Daulton earned his first All-star appearance, the NL Silver Slugger Award, and sixth place in NL MVP voting.

Daulton was one of the catalysts of the NL pennant-winning 1993 Phillies. Although the Phillies lost the World Series, Daulton was again named an All-Star, drove in more than 100 runs for the second consecutive season, and finished seventh in NL MVP voting. He once again finished in the league's top 10 in on-base percentage, RBIs, walks, and extra base hits. Daulton also finished in the top 10 in times on base and intentional walks.

Knee injuries soon caught up with Daulton. In 1994, he was hitting .300, with 15 home runs, and 56 RBIs, through 67 games, when he was injured. In 1995, Daulton was named to his third all-star team; however, he played in only 98 games, and finished the year with just nine home runs. Daulton never caught another big league game after August 25, 1995.

Daulton missed nearly the entire 1996 season due to injury; he played in only five games, all as an outfielder. In 1997, he returned to the outfield in an attempt to keep his still-productive bat in the line-up, despite his chronic injuries. Daulton also played 42 games as a first baseman.

=== Florida Marlins ===
On July 21, 1997, after 17 years with the Phillies organization, the club traded Daulton to the Florida Marlins for Billy McMillon. By that time, Daulton's knee injuries had escalated even further, limiting his usage to playing first base and pinch hitting. He ended the 1997 campaign with a .263 batting average, 14 home runs, 63 RBI, and 68 runs scored, in 395 at bats. Daulton batted 7-for-18 (.389) in the 1997 World Series, as the Marlins defeated the Cleveland Indians. Daulton announced his retirement after the series.

=== Career statistics ===
In 14 MLB seasons, Daulton hit .245, with 137 home runs, 588 RBIs, and 511 runs scored, in 1,161 games played. Bill James ranked Daulton as the 25th-greatest major league catcher of all time, in the 2001 edition of his Historical Baseball Abstract.

On August 6, 2010, Daulton was inducted into the Philadelphia Baseball Wall of Fame.

== Post-playing career ==
=== Arrests ===
Daulton was arrested several times on vehicle-related charges. He was arrested for driving under the influence (DUI) in Pinellas County, Florida, in 1988, and his driver's license was suspended for a year after he refused to take a breathalyzer test. His license was again suspended in the late 1990s due to unpaid speeding tickets; he received at least five speeding tickets during that time period, including one for driving in excess of 100 miles per hour (160 km/h) in a 65-mile-per-hour (105 km/h) zone.

While under his second license suspension, he was involved in a single-vehicle accident on January 3, 2001, causing $20,000 worth of damage to his BMW sedan. He again refused to be tested, and was again charged with DUI and also with driving with a suspended license and failing to appear in court.

Two years later, Daulton was arrested a third time for driving with a suspended license and DUI, after again refusing to be tested for alcohol.

He was arrested a fourth time for battery against his wife. He served two and a half months in jail and spent another two and a half months in drug rehabilitation.

=== Daulton Foundation ===
In the years following his arrests and jail time, Daulton began to turn his life around, acknowledging his shortcomings and doing work within the local community and charity. In 2013, Daulton founded The Darren Daulton Foundation with his wife Amanda. The foundation, which went on to issue grants to over 100 people totaling over $250,000, provided financial assistance to those who suffer from primary brain tumors. The foundation is still active to this day.

=== Author ===
Daulton authored a book on occultism and numerology, If They Only Knew, published in 2007. In the book, he writes about numerous aspects of occultism, referencing experts in the field, and addressing his own personal experience with the paranormal.

=== Radio show ===
From 2010 to 2016, during the Philadelphia Phillies season, Daulton hosted the radio show "Talking Baseball with Dutch" from 6 p.m. to 7 p.m. on sports radio station WPEN in Philadelphia.

== Illness and death ==
On July 1, 2013, Daulton underwent surgery for resection of two brain tumors related to glioblastoma at Thomas Jefferson University Hospital in Philadelphia. On February 23, 2015, Daulton announced that he was cancer-free. The cancer returned in early 2017, and Daulton died from brain cancer on August 6, 2017, aged 55. He is buried in Memorial Lawn Cemetery in Arkansas City.

== Publications ==
- Darren Daulton (2007). If They Only Knew. Blue Note Books. ISBN 978-1878398932.
- William C. Kashatus (2017) Macho Row: The 1993 Phillies and Baseball's Unwritten Code. University of Nebraska Press. ISBN 9780803290860

== See also ==
- List of Silver Slugger Award winners at catcher
- List of Major League Baseball annual runs batted in leaders
