= Dave Hollins =

American baseball player (born 1966)

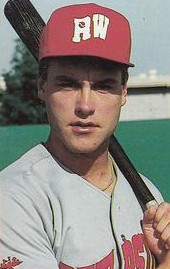
- Hollins in 1988
- Third baseman
- Born: May 25, 1966 (age 60); Buffalo, New York, U.S.
- Batted: Switch Threw: Right

MLB debut
- April 12, 1990, for the Philadelphia Phillies

Last MLB appearance
- September 25, 2002, for the Philadelphia Phillies

MLB statistics
- Batting average: .262
- Home runs: 112
- Runs batted in: 482
- Stats at Baseball Reference

Teams
- Philadelphia Phillies (1990–1995); Boston Red Sox (1995); Minnesota Twins (1996); Seattle Mariners (1996); Anaheim Angels (1997–1998); Toronto Blue Jays (1999); Cleveland Indians (2001); Philadelphia Phillies (2002)

Career highlights and awards
- All-Star (1993)

David Michael Hollins (born May 25, 1966) is an American former third baseman in Major League Baseball.

== Early life ==
Hollins played baseball at Orchard Park High School, where he graduated in 1984. He attended the University of South Carolina and played college baseball for them for three seasons.

== Playing career ==
Hollins was selected by the San Diego Padres in the 6th round of the 1987 amateur draft. After spending three seasons in the Padres' minor league system, he was picked up by the Philadelphia Phillies in the rule 5 draft after the 1989 season. He spent six seasons with the Phillies. During the 1993 postseason, Hollins played a key role in the Phillies making the world series, including a notable two run-homer during a series-deciding NLCS Game 6 win over the Atlanta Braves. During that same year, Hollins was a member of the National League All-Star team.

Between 1993 and 1995, Hollins had three surgeries on his wrist, and frequently missed time due to injuries. In 1996, he was traded from the Minnesota Twins to the Mariners for a player-to-be-named-later. That player turned out to be David Ortiz. Hollins returned briefly to the Phillies in 2002, making their 25-man roster. Hollins had 17 at bats for the team and two hits, however, before he was placed on the disabled list due to harmful spider bites that aggravated his diabetes. On May 21, 2003, Hollins announced his retirement.

== Post-playing career ==
Hollins spent the 2005 season as the hitting coach for the Binghamton Mets, a minor league affiliate of the New York Mets in the Class AA Eastern League, and Hollins is now a scout for the Philadelphia Phillies. Hollins has been named a member of the Buffalo Baseball Hall of Fame.

== Personal life ==
Hollins's son, Dave "Bubba" Hollins, was drafted by the Detroit Tigers in the 2014 Major League Baseball draft. Another son, Beau Hollins, plays college baseball for the South Carolina Gamecocks.
