= Mike Stanton (left-handed pitcher) =

American baseball player (born 1967)

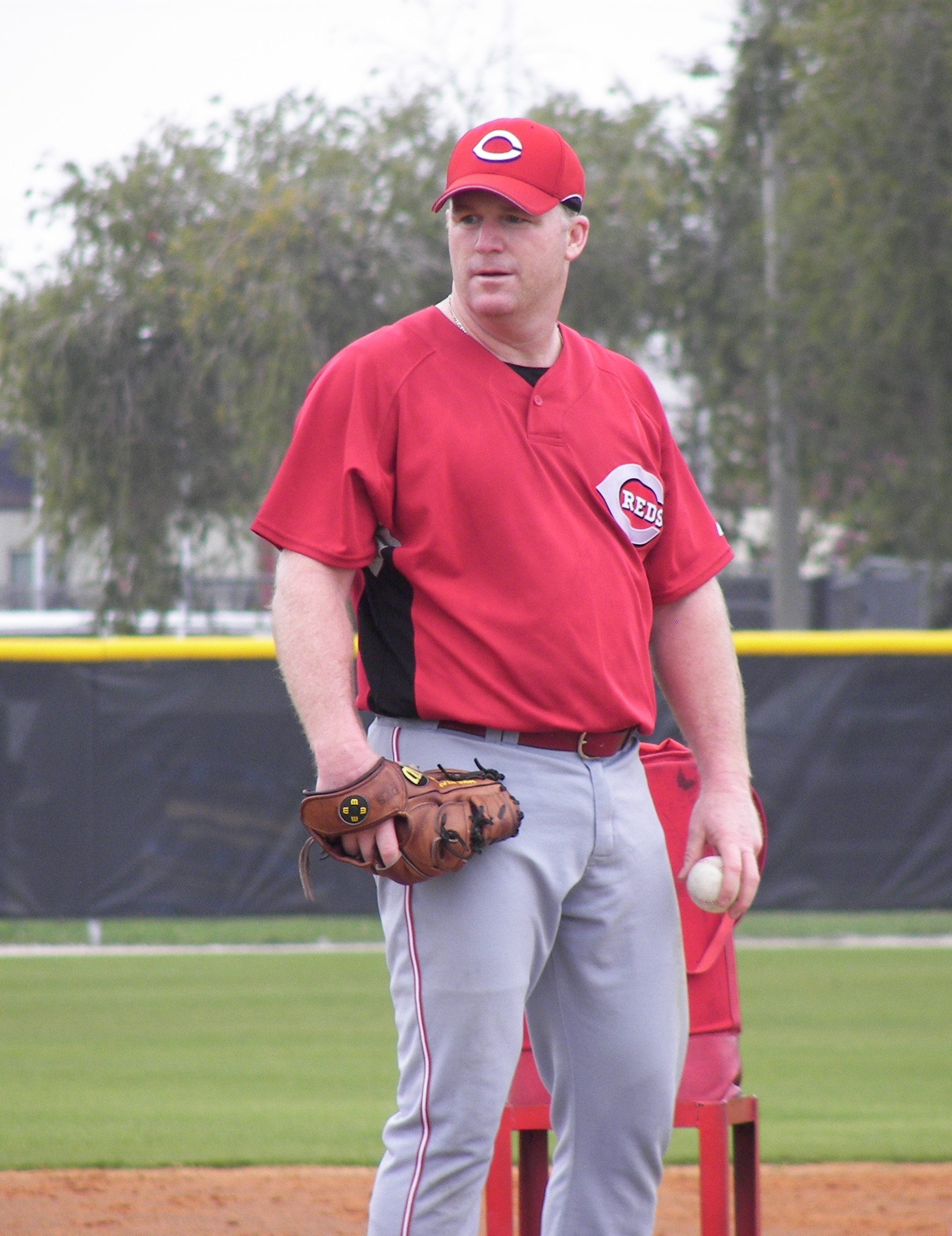
- Stanton during Spring training in 2008
- Pitcher
- Born: June 2, 1967 (age 58); Houston, Texas, U.S.
- Batted: Left Threw: Left

MLB debut
- August 24, 1989, for the Atlanta Braves

Last MLB appearance
- September 30, 2007, for the Cincinnati Reds

MLB statistics
- Games pitched: 1,178
- Win–loss record: 68–63
- Earned run average: 3.92
- Strikeouts: 895
- Stats at Baseball Reference

Teams
- Atlanta Braves (1989–1995); Boston Red Sox (1995–1996); Texas Rangers (1996); New York Yankees (1997–2002); New York Mets (2003–2004); New York Yankees (2005); Washington Nationals (2005); Boston Red Sox (2005); Washington Nationals (2006); San Francisco Giants (2006); Cincinnati Reds (2007)

Career highlights and awards
- All-Star (2001); 3× World Series champion (1998–2000)

William Michael Stanton (born June 2, 1967) is an American former left-handed relief pitcher who pitched for eight teams in Major League Baseball between 1989 and 2007. Stanton won the World Series in 1998, 1999, and 2000 as a member of the New York Yankees.

== Early life ==
Stanton graduated from Midland High School in Midland, Texas, where he played baseball, basketball and football. However, he did not pitch at all in high school. His first pitching appearance came at Southwestern University in Georgetown, Texas. Stanton also attended Alvin Community College.

== Baseball career ==
Stanton relied throughout his career on a fastball, slider, and curveball. He also developed a two-seam fastball and changeup.

=== Atlanta Braves (1989–1995) ===
Stanton was drafted by the Atlanta Braves. He made his major league debut with the Braves in 1989 and spent the first six years of his career with the team. He pitched in 20 games in his first year, racking up 27 strikeouts and seven saves.

Stanton struggled mightily in his sophomore season, going 0–3 with an ERA of 18.00 in just seven innings (giving up 14 runs). His first full year in the major leagues was 1991, and he put up a 5–5 record in 74 games, earning a spot on the Braves' postseason roster. He pitched well, allowing just one run in eight total games and earning a win in the 1991 World Series.

In 1992, Stanton went 5–4, (his first season with a record over .500). The Braves once again lost the World Series, this time to the Toronto Blue Jays. Stanton allowed three hits and two walks during the series. The next year, he fashioned a 4–6 record with a in 63 games, but earned a career-high 27 saves. He pitched one inning of one-hit, one-walk baseball in the 1993 National League Championship Series.

In 1994, Stanton fashioned a 3–1 record before the strike ended the season early. He was granted free agency following the season, but re-signed on April 12, 1995. When play resumed in 1995, Stanton pitched in 26 games, garnering a 1–1 record and 5.59 ERA before being traded on July 31 to the Boston Red Sox. The Braves would go on to win the World Series that season, but Stanton was nevertheless awarded a World Series ring.

=== Boston Red Sox (1995–1996) ===
Stanton pitched in 22 games with a 1–0 record and 3.00 ERA in 1995. He allowed one hit and struck out four in his only postseason appearance. In 1996, he fashioned a 4–3 record with a 3.83 ERA before being traded to the Texas Rangers.

=== Texas Rangers (1996) ===
Stanton pitched in 23 games while surrendering eight runs. In the 1996 American League Division Series, he pitched in three games, earning one loss and surrendering his only postseason home run. On October 27, 1996, he was granted free agency, and he signed with the Yankees on December 11.

=== New York Yankees (1997–2002) ===
Stanton pitched for the New York Yankees for seven seasons. During that span, Stanton was a large part of the Yankees World Series teams, proving himself in big roles out of the bullpen. He garnered a 6–1 record in 1997, and appeared in 64 games. In the 1997 American League Division Series, he allowed one hit in one inning while striking out three. In 1998, Stanton went 4–1 and collected six saves during the Yankees' 114-win season. After not pitching in the Division Series, he returned during the Championship Series and allowed two hits and one walk while striking out four over three games. In the 1998 World Series, Stanton allowed three hits and two earned runs, and earned a World Series ring as the Yankees swept the Padres four games to none. In 1999, he was 2–2 in 73 games, and did not pitch in the Division Series.

In the Championship Series, he allowed one hit in 1/3 of an inning. However, he rebounded in the 1999 World Series, striking out the only batter he faced. On November 5, he was granted free agency, but re-signed with the Yankees on November 29. In 2000, he was 2–3 with a 4.10 ERA over 69 games. He pitched in four innings of one-hit ball in the Division Series and did not pitch in the Championship Series. In the 2000 World Series, he earned two wins in four games. In 2001, he was 9–4 with a 2.58 ERA and was selected to the 2001 All-Star team. He pitched in all three games of the 2001 American League Division Series and in two games of the 2001 American League Championship Series. He pitched in five games of the 2001 World Series.

In 2002, he was 7–1 with a 3.00 ERA, and pitched in three games in the 2002 American League Division Series allowing three runs.

Following the 2002 season, the Yankees offered Stanton a two-year, $4.6 million contract to remain with the team. The Yankees gave Stanton 15 minutes to make a decision; he did not respond to their offer.

=== New York Mets (2003–2004) ===
On December 16, 2002, Stanton signed a three-year, $9 million contract with the New York Mets. He spent two seasons with the club. Stanton posted a career-worst 2–7 with a 4.57 ERA with the Mets in 2003. He posted a 2–6 record in 2004 despite rebounding back with a 3.16 ERA. He was traded on December 4 for Félix Heredia. August 3, 2004, Stanton struck out four batters in one inning. He struck out Gary Bennett, Scott Podsednik (who reached base on an uncaught third strike), Trent Durrington, and Wes Helms.

=== Return to the Yankees (2005) ===
Stanton pitched in 28 games with the Yankees in 2005 with a 7.07 ERA. He was released on July 1.

=== Later career ===
Stanton was 2–1 with the Washington Nationals, posting a 3.58 ERA and finishing six games. On September 29, he was traded to the Boston Red Sox, where he pitched one inning of one-hit ball. He was released by the Red Sox on October 12.

He re-signed with Washington on December 24 and was 3–5 with a 4.47 ERA in 56 games. On July 28, 2006, he was traded to the San Francisco Giants. He was 4–2 with the Giants over 26 games and was released on October 30. On November 20, 2006, he signed with the Cincinnati Reds.

With the Reds, he was 1–3 with a 5.93 ERA in 69 games. Despite his high salary due in 2008, the Reds cut Stanton from the team, going instead with veteran lefty Kent Mercker. The Reds paid $3.5 million in salary to make the cut, including the 2008 salary and the 2009 option. After being cut by the Reds, Stanton signed a minor league contract with an invitation to spring training with the Chicago Cubs on January 20, 2009. He did not make the team and was released on March 30.

In his major league career, Stanton posted a 68–63 record with a 3.92 ERA and 84 saves in 1178 games pitched which ranks him second all-time in appearances behind Jesse Orosco (1252). He is also the all-time leader in holds with 266 when counting games before 1999, when MLB started counting it as an official statistic.

Despite being a set-up man, Stanton chose to come out of the bullpen to an entrance song like many Major League closers do. Stanton usually entered to Aldo Nova's "Fantasy". With the New York Mets however, he came in to Metallica's "Enter Sandman" during save situations as a tribute to Mariano Rivera, whom he set up for in his Yankees years.

=== Mitchell Report ===
Stanton was mentioned in the Mitchell Report for purchasing human growth hormone, implicated by Kirk Radomski. Stanton has flatly denied any wrongdoing or any connection to any type of performance-enhancing drugs in his baseball career. Stanton's alleged HGH use was also mentioned in testimony by Brian McNamee during the Roger Clemens trial.

== Coaching career ==
Stanton worked as the head coach of the varsity baseball team at Don Bosco Preparatory High School in Ramsey, New Jersey.

== Broadcasting career ==
From 2013 to 2024, Stanton hosted the pregame show for the Houston Astros on Space City Home Network.

== See also ==
- List of Major League Baseball single-inning strikeout leaders
- List of Major League Baseball players named in the Mitchell Report
