= Danny Jackson =

American baseball player (born 1962)

- Jackson in 1985
- Pitcher
- Born: January 5, 1962 (age 64); San Antonio, Texas, U.S.
- Batted: Right Threw: Left

MLB debut
- September 11, 1983, for the Kansas City Royals

Last MLB appearance
- August 7, 1997, for the San Diego Padres

MLB statistics
- Win–loss record: 112–131
- Earned run average: 4.01
- Strikeouts: 1,225
- Stats at Baseball Reference

Teams
- Kansas City Royals (1983–1987); Cincinnati Reds (1988–1990); Chicago Cubs (1991–1992); Pittsburgh Pirates (1992); Philadelphia Phillies (1993–1994); St. Louis Cardinals (1995–1997); San Diego Padres (1997)

Career highlights and awards
- 2× All-Star (1988, 1994); 2× World Series champion (1985, 1990); NL wins leader (1988)

Danny Lynn Jackson (born January 5, 1962) is an American former professional baseball pitcher who played 15 seasons in Major League Baseball from 1983 to 1997. He played for the Kansas City Royals, Cincinnati Reds, Chicago Cubs, Pittsburgh Pirates, Philadelphia Phillies, St. Louis Cardinals, and San Diego Padres.

Jackson is best known for pitching an immaculate inning during Game 5 of the 1985 World Series, which remains the only immaculate inning pitched in postseason play. He won the World Series that year with the Royals, as well as the 1990 World Series with the Reds.

== Early life ==
Danny Lynn Jackson was born on January 5, 1962, in San Antonio, Texas. His family moved to the greater Denver area, where Jackson starred in three sports at Aurora Central High School. The Oakland Athletics drafted him in the 24th round as a high school senior in 1980, but Jackson opted to go to the University of Oklahoma. He played for the Sooners in 1981 before opting to transfer to Trinidad State Junior College in Trinidad, Colorado. In 1982, the Royals, with the first pick in the January secondary phase draft, chose Jackson.

== Career ==
=== Kansas City Royals (1983–1987) ===
A key member of the World Series-winning Royals in 1985, Jackson made one of the most important starts in Royals history in the American League Championship Series (ALCS). Trailing the Toronto Blue Jays three games to one and facing elimination, Jackson tossed a complete-game shutout and kept the Royals alive. Two weeks later, in the World Series, Jackson again took the ball with the Royals trailing three games to one in a Game Five, and again Jackson led the Royals to a crucial victory over the St. Louis Cardinals. In the seventh inning of that game, he pitched, as of 2023, the only immaculate inning in World Series play; his victims were Terry Pendleton, Tom Nieto and Brian Harper. Jackson's 1.04 post-season ERA with the Royals is the lowest in team history (min 10 IP). The Royals went on to win the World Series in seven games. After disappointing seasons in 1986 and 1987, Jackson was traded along with Ángel Salazar to the Cincinnati Reds in exchange for Ted Power and Kurt Stillwell.

=== Cincinnati Reds (1988–1990) ===
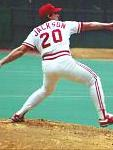
Jackson in 1990

Jackson was selected to the National League NL All-Star team in 1988 and 1994. He tied for the National League lead in wins in 1988 with 23 and, Jackson combined with 18-game winner Tom Browning for the best pitching tandem in baseball that season. Jackson's great 1988 season went largely unnoticed because of the outstanding season turned in by the Dodgers' Orel Hershiser, who threw 59 straight scoreless innings. Jackson regressed in the following two seasons, when he went 12–17 with a 4.60 ERA, but won his second World Series ring in 1990.

=== Later career (1991–1997) ===
After the World Series, Jackson became a free agent and signed with the Chicago Cubs. After one and a half seasons where he was unable to pitch effectively, he was traded to the Pittsburgh Pirates. He was then taken in the 1992 expansion draft by the Florida Marlins, who traded him to the Philadelphia Phillies. He improved in Philadelphia, putting together two winning seasons and earning his second All-Star nod in 1994. He signed with the St. Louis Cardinals after the 1994 season, but was never able to pitch effectively again. His final season was in 1997, during which he was traded to the San Diego Padres.

In total, Jackson played in three World Series for three different franchises: the 1985 Kansas City Royals, the 1990 Cincinnati Reds, and the 1993 Philadelphia Phillies. Jackson only made 29 career relief appearances (324 starts) but did pick up one career save. It came on July 12, 1986, against the Detroit Tigers. Jackson recorded the final out of the game to nail down a 7-4 Royals victory. He saved the game for starter Charlie Leibrandt.

== See also ==
- List of Major League Baseball annual wins leaders
