= Ben Rivera =

Dominican baseball player (born 1968)

- Pitcher
- Born: January 11, 1968 (age 57); San Pedro de Macorís, Dominican Republic
- Batted: Right Threw: Right

Professional debut
- MLB: April 9, 1992, for the Atlanta Braves
- CPBL: February 25, 1997, for the Chinatrust Whales
- NPB: April 5, 1998, for the Hanshin Tigers

Last appearance
- MLB: July 31, 1994, for the Philadelphia Phillies
- NPB: August 4, 1999, for the Hanshin Tigers
- CPBL: October 31, 2004, for the Macoto Cobras

MLB statistics
- Win–loss record: 23–17
- Earned run average: 4.52
- Strikeouts: 219

CPBL statistics
- Win–loss record: 7–6
- Earned run average: 2.30
- Strikeouts: 138

NPB statistics
- Win–loss record: 3–4
- Earned run average: 1.84
- Strikeouts: 74

KBO statistics
- Win–loss record: 6–3
- Earned run average: 2.62
- Strikeouts: 63
- Stats at Baseball Reference

Teams
- Atlanta Braves (1992); Philadelphia Phillies (1992–1994); Chinatrust Whales (1997); Hanshin Tigers (1998–1999); Samsung Lions (2001); Macoto Cobras (2004)

Bienvenido "Ben" Rivera Santana (born January 11, 1968) is a Dominican former professional baseball pitcher. He played three seasons in Major League Baseball from 1992-1994 for the Philadelphia Phillies and Atlanta Braves. He was a member of the 1993 National League Champion Phillies. He also played two seasons in Nippon Professional Baseball for the Hanshin Tigers in 1998-1999, and one season in the KBO League for the Samsung Lions in 2001.
