= Terry Mulholland =

American baseball player (born 1963)

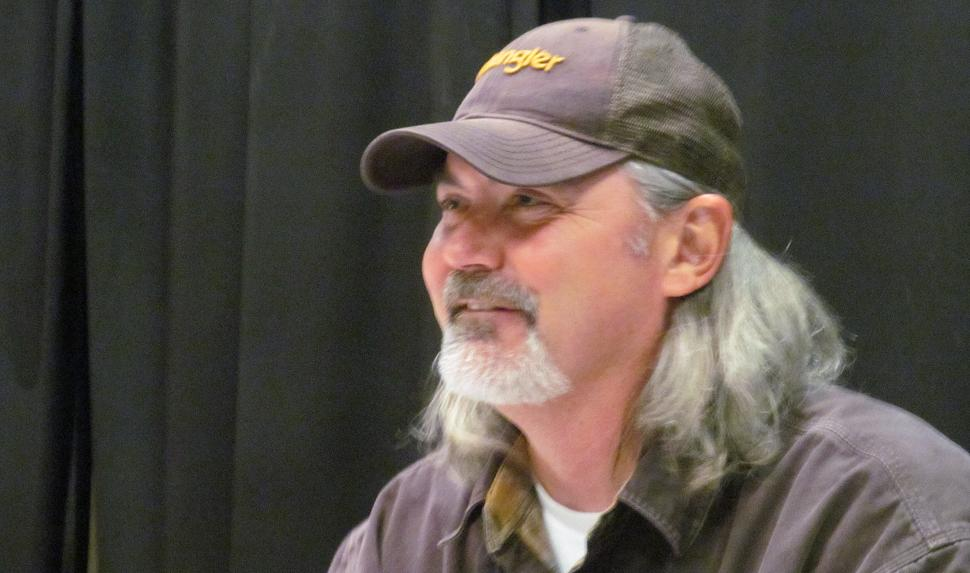
- Mulholland in 2012
- Pitcher
- Born: March 9, 1963 (age 63); Uniontown, Pennsylvania, U.S.
- Batted: Right Threw: Left

MLB debut
- June 8, 1986, for the San Francisco Giants

Last MLB appearance
- June 3, 2006, for the Arizona Diamondbacks

MLB statistics
- Win–loss record: 124–142
- Earned run average: 4.41
- Strikeouts: 1,325
- Stats at Baseball Reference

Teams
- San Francisco Giants (1986, 1988–1989); Philadelphia Phillies (1989–1993); New York Yankees (1994); San Francisco Giants (1995); Philadelphia Phillies (1996); Seattle Mariners (1996); Chicago Cubs (1997); San Francisco Giants (1997); Chicago Cubs (1998–1999); Atlanta Braves (1999–2000); Pittsburgh Pirates (2001); Los Angeles Dodgers (2001–2002); Cleveland Indians (2002–2003); Minnesota Twins (2004–2005); Arizona Diamondbacks (2006)

Career highlights and awards
- All-Star (1993); Pitched a no-hitter on August 15, 1990

Terence John Mulholland (born March 9, 1963) is an American former professional baseball pitcher. His Major League Baseball (MLB) career spanned 20 seasons, 1986 and 1988 to 2006. He threw left-handed and batted right-handed.

== Early life and education ==
Mulholland was born in Uniontown, Pennsylvania. He attended Laurel Highlands High School in Uniontown, where he graduated in 1981.

He attended Marietta College in Marietta, Ohio, where he majored in sports medicine and played for NCAA Division III coach Don Schaly. He was a first team All-American his junior season when he was drafted in the first round by the San Francisco Giants.

== Career ==
=== San Francisco Giants ===
Mulholland was drafted by the San Francisco Giants with the 24th overall pick in the 1984 MLB draft; he was chosen as a compensation pick from the Detroit Tigers for the signing of Darrell Evans. Mulholland made his major league debut with the Giants on June 8, 1986. After that, he played for eleven different Major League teams: the Giants, the Phillies, the Yankees, the Mariners, the Cubs, the Braves, the Dodgers, the Pirates, the Indians, the Twins, and the Diamondbacks.

He is well known for having one of the "nastiest" pickoff moves in the game.

While pitching for the Giants, Mulholland made a play that is often shown on sports bloopers shows. On September 3, 1986, against the New York Mets, Mulholland fielded a hard-hit ground ball hit by Keith Hernandez. However, the ball got stuck in the webbing of his glove. Mulholland then trotted towards first base and tossed his glove to first baseman Bob Brenly, who recorded the out.

=== Philadelphia Phillies ===
On June 18, 1989, the Giants traded Mulholland, Dennis Cook and Charlie Hayes for former Cy Young Award winner Steve Bedrosian and a player to be named later. On August 15, 1990, Mulholland no-hit the Giants 6–0 at Veterans Stadium. In pitching this, the first no-hitter in the stadium's history, Mulholland became the first pitcher to no-hit a former team since the Houston Colt .45s' Ken Johnson did so against the Cincinnati Reds in 1964 (Johnson lost the game 1-0—the only game, to date, whose losing pitcher had pitched a nine-inning no-hitter). He faced the minimum of 27 batters. The only batter to reach base was on a throwing error by Hayes on Rick Parker's ground ball leading off the seventh inning; Parker was retired on Dave Anderson's double play ground ball one batter later. The 27th out was made by Hayes with a lunging catch of Gary Carter's line drive down the 3rd base line. He defeated Don Robinson, who also served up the 500th career home run to Phillies legend, Mike Schmidt, just three years earlier.

Mulholland was the starting pitcher for the National League in the 1993 Major League Baseball All-Star Game played at Camden Yards in Baltimore, Maryland.

Mulholland started two games for the Phillies in the 1993 World Series versus the Toronto Blue Jays. He was the winning pitcher of game 2, and also started game 6 in which the Blue Jays would win the series on a walk-off, series-ending home run from Joe Carter against Phillies closer Mitch Williams.

=== Chicago Cubs ===
Mulholland was instrumental in the Cubs' 1998 playoff run, pitching primarily in relief.

=== Atlanta Braves ===
At the 1999 trading deadline, the Braves acquired Mulholland along with infielder José Hernández from the Chicago Cubs for Micah Bowie, Rubén Quevedo and a player to be named later. He appeared in 16 games down the stretch with the Braves, going 4–2 with an ERA of 2.98, during a season that the Braves went to the World Series. The next season, Mulholland was used as a spot starter for the Braves, and went 9–9 with a 5.11 ERA in 156.7 innings of work. He became a free agent after the season ended.

=== Minnesota Twins ===
While pitching for the Minnesota Twins Mulholland became one of the few players who have beaten every Major League team.

=== Arizona Diamondbacks ===
On June 21, 2006, the Diamondbacks waived Mulholland.

== Personal life ==
Mulholland lists baseball card collecting as one of his hobbies.

== See also ==
- List of Major League Baseball no-hitters

Preceded by Fernando Valenzuela	No-hitter pitcher August 15, 1990	Succeeded by Dave Stieb
