= 1993 San Francisco Giants season =

1993 San Francisco Giants
- League: National League
- Division: West
- Ballpark: Candlestick Park
- City: San Francisco, California
- Owners: Peter Magowan
- General managers: Bob Quinn
- Managers: Dusty Baker
- Television: KTVU; SportsChannel Pacific (Ted Robinson, Mike Krukow, Joe Morgan)
- Radio: KNBR (Ted Robinson, Hank Greenwald, Barry Tompkins, Mike Krukow); SP Radio (Edgard Martinez, Julio Gonzalez, Rene De La Rosa)

The 1993 San Francisco Giants season was the Giants' 111th season in Major League Baseball, their 36th season in San Francisco since their move from New York following the 1957 season, and their 34th season at Candlestick Park. It was the first season with Dusty Baker as manager, having been promoted from previously serving as the hitting coach under Roger Craig. In the offseason, under new ownership and general manager, Barry Bonds left the Pittsburgh Pirates to sign a lucrative free agent contract worth a then-record $43.75 million over six years with the Giants, with whom his father, Bobby Bonds, spent the first seven years of his career, and with whom his godfather Willie Mays played 22 of his 24 Major League seasons. The deal was, at that time, the largest in baseball history, in terms of both total value and average annual salary. To honor his father, Bonds switched his jersey number to 25 once he signed with the Giants, as it had been Bobby's number in San Francisco (His number during most of his stay with the Pirates, 24, was already retired in honor of Mays). Bonds hit .336 in 1993, leading the league with 46 home runs and 123 RBI en route to his second consecutive MVP award and third overall (of an eventual seven).

As good as the Giants were (winning 103 games), the Atlanta Braves won 104 in what some call the last great pennant race (due to the Wild Card being instituted the following season). As of today, the 1993 Giants have the fourth-highest win total of a non-divisional winner in Major League Baseball history, and the second highest win total of a team that did not make the playoffs (behind the 1942 Dodgers).

In the first half of the season prior to the All-Star Game, the Giants had taken 5 out of the 7 games against the Braves. Prior to the series beginning on August 23, the Giants had only lost 5 series all year long and had not lost more than 4 games in any 7-day period. After leading the National League West by ten games on July 22, and still holding a 7 1/2-game lead a month later, the Giants went 6–15 and relinquished the division lead to the Braves. The Giants then went on a 14–2 run, which left them tied with the Braves with one game remaining, which they lost 12–1 to the 80–81 Los Angeles Dodgers to become the only National League team to win 100 or more games and not make the playoffs in the divisional play era.

== Offseason ==
On November 10, 1992, National League owners voted 9–4 against allowing Giants owner Bob Lurie to sell the team for $115 million to a Tampa Bay group, which would have moved the Giants to the Florida Suncoast Dome in time for the 1993 season.

- November 17, 1992: Steve Decker was drafted by the Florida Marlins from the San Francisco Giants as the 35th pick in the 1992 expansion draft.
- December 8, 1992: Barry Bonds signed as a free agent with the San Francisco Giants.
- December 10, 1992: Jim Pena was traded by the San Francisco Giants to the San Diego Padres for Paul Faries.
- December 16, 1992: Hitting coach Dusty Baker was promoted to manager.

== Regular season ==
During the season, John Burkett and Bill Swift would be the last pitchers to win at least 20 games in one season for the Giants in the 20th century.

=== Opening day starters ===
- Barry Bonds
- John Burkett
- Will Clark
- Royce Clayton
- Kirt Manwaring
- Dave Martinez
- Willie McGee
- Robby Thompson
- Matt Williams

=== Season standings ===
NL West
Team	W	L	Pct.	GB	Home	Road
Atlanta Braves	104	58	.642	—	51‍–‍30	53‍–‍28
San Francisco Giants	103	59	.636	1	50‍–‍31	53‍–‍28
Houston Astros	85	77	.525	19	44‍–‍37	41‍–‍40
Los Angeles Dodgers	81	81	.500	23	41‍–‍40	40‍–‍41
Cincinnati Reds	73	89	.451	31	41‍–‍40	32‍–‍49
Colorado Rockies	67	95	.414	37	39‍–‍42	28‍–‍53
San Diego Padres	61	101	.377	43	34‍–‍47	27‍–‍54

=== Record vs. opponents ===
1993 National League record Source: MLB Standings Grid – 1993
Team	ATL	CHC	CIN	COL	FLA	HOU	LAD	MON	NYM	PHI	PIT	SD	SF	STL
Atlanta	—	7–5	10–3	13–0	7–5	8–5	8–5	7–5	9–3	6–6	7–5	9–4	7–6	6–6
Chicago	5–7	—	7–5	8–4	6–7	4–8	7–5	5–8–1	8–5	7–6	5–8	8–4	6–6	8–5
Cincinnati	3–10	5–7	—	9–4	7–5	6–7	5–8	4–8	6–6	4–8	8–4	9–4	2–11	5–7
Colorado	0–13	4–8	4–9	—	7–5	11–2	7–6	3–9	6–6	3–9	8–4	6–7	3–10	5–7
Florida	5–7	7–6	5–7	5–7	—	3–9	5–7	5–8	4–9	4–9	6–7	7–5	4–8	4–9
Houston	5–8	8–4	7–6	2–11	9–3	—	9–4	5–7	11–1	5–7	7–5	8–5	3–10	6–6
Los Angeles	5–8	5–7	8–5	6–7	7–5	4–9	—	6–6	8–4	2–10	8–4	9–4	7–6	6–6
Montreal	5–7	8–5–1	8–4	9–3	8–5	7–5	6–6	—	9–4	6–7	8–5	10–2	3–9	7–6
New York	3–9	5–8	6–6	6–6	9–4	1–11	4–8	4–9	—	3–10	4–9	5–7	4–8	5–8
Philadelphia	6-6	6–7	8–4	9–3	9–4	7–5	10–2	7–6	10–3	—	7–6	6–6	4–8	8–5
Pittsburgh	5–7	8–5	4–8	4–8	7–6	5–7	4–8	5–8	9–4	6–7	—	9–3	5–7	4–9
San Diego	4–9	4–8	4–9	7–6	5–7	5–8	4–9	2–10	7–5	6–6	3–9	—	3–10	7–5
San Francisco	6–7	6–6	11–2	10–3	8–4	10–3	6–7	9–3	8–4	8–4	7–5	10–3	—	4–8
St. Louis	6–6	5–8	7–5	7–5	9–4	6–6	6–6	6–7	8–5	5–8	9–4	5–7	8–4	—

=== Notable Transactions ===
- August 3, 1993: Scott Sanderson was selected off waivers by the San Francisco Giants from the California Angels.
- August 28, 1993: Jim DeShaies was traded by the Minnesota Twins to the San Francisco Giants for a player to be named later, Aaron Fultz, and Andres Duncan (minors). The San Francisco Giants sent Greg Brummett (September 1, 1993) to the Minnesota Twins to complete the trade.

==== Draft picks ====
- June 3, 1993: Steve Soderstrom was drafted by the San Francisco Giants in the 1st round (6th pick) of the 1993 amateur draft. Player signed July 28, 1993.
- June 3, 1993: Bill Mueller was drafted by the San Francisco Giants in the 15th round of the 1993 amateur draft. Player signed June 4, 1993.

=== Major League debuts ===
- Batters:
  - Rikkert Faneyte (Aug 29)
  - Erik Johnson (Jul 8)
  - J.R. Phillips (Sep 3)
- Pitchers:
  - Greg Brummett (May 29)
  - Salomon Torres (Aug 29)

=== Roster ===
1993 San Francisco Giants
Roster
Pitchers: 47 Rod Beck; 40 Bud Black; 49 Jeff Brantley; 37 Terry Bross; 50 Greg Brummett; 34 Dave Burba; 33 John Burkett; 30 Jim Deshaies; 41 Bryan Hickerson; 42 Mike Jackson; 36 Tim Layana; 36,39 Gino Minutelli; 19 Dave Righetti; 28 Kevin Rogers; 29 Scott Sanderson; 26 Bill Swift; 35 Salomón Torres; 32 Trevor Wilson	Catchers: 37 Andy Allanson; 46 Craig Colbert; 8 Kirt Manwaring; 30 Jim McNamara; 52 Jeff Reed; Infielders: 18 Mike Benjamin; 14 Todd Benzinger; 22 Will Clark; 10 Royce Clayton; 21 Paul Faries; 36 Erik Johnson; 31 J. R. Phillips; 23,38 Steve Scarsone; 6 Robby Thompson; 9 Matt Williams	Outfielders: 25 Barry Bonds; 45 Mark Carreon; 38 Rikkert Faneyte; 29 Steve Hosey; 2 Darren Lewis; 1,17 Dave Martinez; 51 Willie McGee; 17 Luis Mercedes; Other batters: 7 John Patterson	Manager: 12 Dusty Baker; Coaches: 16 Bobby Bonds (Hitting/first base); 15 Bob Brenly (Bullpen); 20 Wendell Kim (Third base); 5 Bob Lillis (Bench); 48 Dick Pole (Pitching)

== Player stats ==
= Indicates team leader

= Indicates league leader

=== Batting ===
==== Starters by position ====
Note: Pos = Position; G = Games played; AB = At bats; H = Hits; HR = Home runs; RBI = Runs batted in; Avg.= Batting average

Pos	Player	G	AB	H	HR	RBI	Avg.
C	Kirt Manwaring	130	432	119	5	49	.275
1B	Will Clark	132	491	139	14	73	.283
2B	Robby Thompson	128	494	154	19	65	.312
3B	Matt Williams	145	579	170	38	110	.294
SS	Royce Clayton	153	549	155	6	70	.282
LF	Barry Bonds	159	539	181	46	123	.336
CF	Darren Lewis	136	522	132	2	48	.253
RF	Willie McGee	130	475	143	4	46	.301

==== Other batters ====
Note: G = Games played; AB = At bats; H = Hits; Avg. = Batting average; HR = Home runs; RBI = Runs batted in

Player	G	AB	H	Avg.	HR	RBI
Dave Martinez	91	241	58	.241	5	27
Todd Benzinger	86	177	51	.288	6	26
Mark Carreon	78	150	49	.327	7	33
Mike Benjamin	63	146	29	.199	4	16
Jeff Reed	66	119	31	.261	6	12
Steve Scarsone	44	103	26	.252	2	15
Craig Colbert	23	37	6	.162	1	5
Paul Faries	15	36	8	.222	0	4
Luis Mercedes	18	25	4	.160	0	3
Andy Allanson	13	24	4	.167	0	2
John Patterson	16	16	3	.188	1	2
J.R. Phillips	11	16	5	.313	1	4
Rikkert Faneyte	7	15	2	.133	0	0
Jim McNamara	4	7	1	.143	0	1
Erik Johnson	4	5	2	.400	0	0
Steve Hosey	3	2	1	.500	0	1

=== Starting pitchers ===
Note: G= Games pitched; IP= Innings pitched: W= Wins; L= Losses; ERA= Earned run average; SO= Strikeouts

Player	G	IP	W	L	ERA	SO
Bill Swift	34	232.2	21	8	2.82	157
John Burkett	34	231.2	22	7	3.65	145
Trevor Wilson	22	110.0	7	5	3.60	57
Bud Black	16	93.2	8	2	3.56	45
Greg Brummett	8	46.0	2	3	4.70	20
Salomon Torres	8	44.2	3	5	4.03	23

==== Other pitchers ====
Note: G = Games pitched; IP = Innings pitched; W = Wins; L = Losses; ERA = Earned run average; SO = Strikeouts

Player	G	IP	W	L	ERA	SO
Bryan Hickerson	47	120.1	7	5	4.26	69
Jeff Brantley	53	113.2	5	6	4.28	76
Scott Sanderson	11	48.2	4	2	3.51	36
Jim Deshaies	5	17.0	2	2	4.24	5

===== Relief pitchers =====
Note: G= Games pitched; IP= innings pitched; W= Wins; L= Losses; SV= Saves; ERA= Earned run average; SO= Strikeouts

Player	G	IP	W	L	SV	ERA	SO
Rod Beck	76	79.1	3	1	48	2.16	86
Mike Jackson	81	77.1	6	6	1	3.03	70
Dave Burba	54	95.1	10	3	0	4.25	88
Kevin Rogers	64	80.2	2	2	0	2.68	62
Dave Righetti	51	47.1	1	1	1	5.70	31
Gino Minutelli	9	14.1	0	1	0	3.77	10
Terry Bross	2	2.0	0	0	1	9.00	1
Tim Layana	1	2.0	0	0	0	22.50	1

== Awards and honors ==
- Barry Bonds, National League Most Valuable Player
- Barry Bonds, National League leader, Home Runs and Runs Batted In
- Kirt Manwaring C, Willie Mac Award

All-Star Game

== Farm system ==
Level	Team	League	Manager
AAA	Phoenix Firebirds	Pacific Coast League	Carlos Alfonso
AA	Shreveport Captains	Texas League	Ron Wotus
A	San Jose Giants	California League	Dick Dietz
A	Clinton Giants	Midwest League	Jack Mull
Short-Season A	Everett Giants	Northwest League	Norm Sherry
Rookie	AZL Giants	Arizona League	Alan Bannister
