= 1992 San Francisco Giants season =

1992 San Francisco Giants
- League: National League
- Division: West
- Ballpark: Candlestick Park
- City: San Francisco, California
- Owners: Bob Lurie
- General managers: Al Rosen
- Managers: Roger Craig
- Television: KTVU; SportsChannel Pacific
- Radio: KNBR (Ron Fairly, Hank Greenwald, Duane Kuiper, Joe Morgan, Mike Krukow); SP Radio (Carlos Rivera)

The 1992 San Francisco Giants season was the Giants' 110th season in Major League Baseball, their 35th season in San Francisco since their move from New York following the 1957 season, and their 33rd at Candlestick Park. The team finished in fifth place in the National League West with a record of 72 wins and 90 losses.

This year, Giants owner Bob Lurie agreed in principle to sell his team to a Tampa Bay-based group of investors led by Vince Naimoli, who would then move the team to St. Petersburg. However, in November 1992, National League owners nixed the move under pressure from San Francisco officials, and the Giants were sold to a group that kept them in San Francisco.

== Offseason ==
- December 11, 1991: Kevin Mitchell was traded by the San Francisco Giants with Mike Remlinger to the Seattle Mariners for Bill Swift, Mike Jackson, and Dave Burba.
- January 13, 1992: Cory Snyder was signed as a free agent with the San Francisco Giants.
- January 30, 1992: Steve Lake was signed as a free agent with the San Francisco Giants.

== Regular season ==
=== Season standings ===
NL West
Team	W	L	Pct.	GB	Home	Road
Atlanta Braves	98	64	.605	—	51‍–‍30	47‍–‍34
Cincinnati Reds	90	72	.556	8	53‍–‍28	37‍–‍44
San Diego Padres	82	80	.506	16	45‍–‍36	37‍–‍44
Houston Astros	81	81	.500	17	47‍–‍34	34‍–‍47
San Francisco Giants	72	90	.444	26	42‍–‍39	30‍–‍51
Los Angeles Dodgers	63	99	.389	35	37‍–‍44	26‍–‍55

=== Record vs. opponents ===
1992 National League record Sources:
Team	ATL	CHC	CIN	HOU	LAD	MON	NYM	PHI	PIT	SD	SF	STL
Atlanta	—	10–2	9–9	13–5	12–6	4–8	7–5	6–6	7–5	13–5	11–7	6–6
Chicago	2–10	—	5–7	8–4	6–6	7–11	9–9	9–9	8–10	5–7	8–4	11–7
Cincinnati	9–9	7–5	—	10–8	11–7	5–7	7–5	7–5	6–6	11–7	10–8	7–5
Houston	5–13	4–8	8–10	—	13–5	8–4	5–7	8–4	6–6	7–11	12–6	5–7
Los Angeles	6–12	6–6	7–11	5–13	—	4–8	5–7	5–7	5–7	9–9	7–11	4–8
Montreal	8–4	11–7	7–5	4–8	8–4	—	12–6	9–9	9–9	8–4	5–7	6–12
New York	5–7	9–9	5–7	7–5	7–5	6–12	—	6–12	4–14	4–8	10–2	9–9
Philadelphia	6-6	9–9	5–7	4–8	7–5	9–9	12–6	—	5–13	3–9	3–9	7–11
Pittsburgh	5–7	10–8	6–6	6–6	7–5	9–9	14–4	13–5	—	5–7	6–6	15–3
San Diego	5–13	7–5	7–11	11–7	9–9	4–8	8–4	9–3	7–5	—	11–7	4–8
San Francisco	7–11	4–8	8–10	6–12	11–7	7–5	2–10	9–3	6–6	7–11	—	5–7
St. Louis	6–6	7–11	5–7	7–5	8–4	12–6	9–9	11–7	3–15	8–4	7–5	—

=== Notable transactions ===
- April 2, 1992: Steve Lake was released by the San Francisco Giants.
- June 1, 1992: Marvin Benard was drafted by the San Francisco Giants in the 50th round of the 1992 amateur draft. Player signed June 4, 1992.

=== Major League debuts ===
- Batters:
  - Craig Colbert (Apr 6)
  - Steve Hosey (Aug 29)
  - Jim McNamara (Apr 9)
  - John Patterson (Apr 6)
- Pitchers:
  - Larry Carter (Sep 6)
  - Jim Pena (Jul 7)
  - Pat Rapp (Jul 10)
  - Steve Reed (Aug 30)
  - Kevin Rogers (Sep 4)

=== Roster ===
1992 San Francisco Giants
Roster
Pitchers: 47 Rod Beck; 40 Bud Black; 49 Jeff Brantley; 34 Dave Burba; 33 John Burkett; 21,52 Larry Carter; 37 Kelly Downs; 36 Gil Heredia; 41 Bryan Hickerson; 42 Mike Jackson; 45 Francisco Oliveras; 31 Jim Pena; 48 Pat Rapp; 36 Steve Reed; 19 Dave Righetti; 21,52 Kevin Rogers; 26 Bill Swift; 32 Trevor Wilson	Catchers: 37 Mark Bailey; 46 Craig Colbert; 35 Steve Decker; 8 Kirt Manwaring; 30 Jim McNamara; Infielders: 18 Mike Benjamin; 22 Will Clark; 10 Royce Clayton; 17,29 Greg Litton; 7 John Patterson; 6 Robby Thompson; 23 José Uribe; 9 Matt Williams	Outfielders: 17 Kevin Bass; 25 Mike Felder; 29 Steve Hosey; 14 Chris James; 1 Mark Leonard; 2 Darren Lewis; 51 Willie McGee; 28 Cory Snyder; 39 Ted Wood	Manager: 38 Roger Craig; Coaches: 16 Carlos Alfonso (Pitching); 12 Dusty Baker (Hitting); 14 Bob Brenly (First Base); 20 Wendell Kim (Third Base); 5 Bob Lillis (Bench Coach)

== Player stats ==
= Indicates team leader

=== Batting ===
Note: Pos = Position; G = Games played; AB = At bats; H = Hits; Avg. = Batting average; HR = Home runs; RBI = Runs batted in

Pos	Player	G	AB	H	Avg.	HR	RBI
C	Kirt Manwaring	109	349	85	.244	4	26
1B	Will Clark	144	513	154	.300	16	73
2B	Robby Thompson	128	443	115	.260	14	49
3B	Matt Williams	146	529	120	.227	20	66
SS	Royce Clayton	98	321	72	.224	4	24
LF	Chris James	111	248	60	.242	5	32
CF	Darren Lewis	100	320	74	.231	1	18
RF	Willie McGee	138	474	141	.297	1	36

==== Other batters ====
Note: G = Games played; AB = At bats; H = Hits; Avg. = Batting average; HR = Home runs; RBI = Runs batted in

Player	G	AB	H	Avg.	HR	RBI
Cory Snyder	124	390	105	.269	14	57
Mike Felder	145	322	92	.286	4	23
Kevin Bass	89	265	71	.268	7	30
José Uribe	66	162	39	.241	2	13
Greg Litton	68	140	32	.229	4	15
Mark Leonard	55	128	30	.234	4	16
Craig Colbert	49	126	29	.230	1	16
John Patterson	32	103	19	.184	0	4
Mike Benjamin	40	75	13	.173	1	3
Jim McNamara	30	74	16	.216	1	9
Ted Wood	24	58	12	.207	1	3
Steve Hosey	21	56	14	.250	1	6
Steve Decker	15	43	7	.163	0	1
Mark Bailey	13	26	4	.154	0	1

=== Pitching ===
= Indicates league leader

==== Starting pitchers ====
Note: G = Games pitched; IP = Innings pitched; W = Wins; L = Losses; ERA = Earned run average; SO = Strikeouts

Player	G	IP	W	L	ERA	SO
John Burkett	32	189.2	13	9	3.84	107
Bud Black	28	177.0	10	12	3.97	82
Bill Swift	30	164.2	10	4	2.08	77
Trevor Wilson	26	154.0	8	14	4.21	88
Kevin Rogers	6	34.0	0	2	4.24	26
Larry Carter	6	33.0	1	5	4.64	21

==== Other pitchers ====
Note: G = Games pitched; IP = Innings pitched; W = Wins; L = Losses; ERA = Earned run average; SO = Strikeouts

Player	G	IP	W	L	ERA	SO
Dave Burba	23	70.2	2	7	4.97	47
Kelly Downs	19	62.1	1	2	3.47	33
Francisco Oliveras	16	44.2	0	3	3.63	17
Gil Heredia	13	30.0	2	3	5.40	15
Pat Rapp	3	10.0	0	2	7.20	3

==== Relief pitchers ====
Note: G = Games pitched; W = Wins; L = Losses; SV = Saves; ERA = Earned run average; SO = Strikeouts

Player	G	W	L	SV	ERA	SO
Rod Beck	65	3	3	17	1.76	87
Mike Jackson	67	6	6	2	3.73	80
Bryan Hickerson	61	5	3	0	3.09	68
Jeff Brantley	56	7	7	7	2.95	86
Dave Righetti	54	2	7	3	5.06	47
Jim Pena	25	1	1	0	3.48	32
Steve Reed	18	1	0	0	2.30	11

== Award winners ==
- Mike Felder CF, Willie Mac Award

All-Star Game

== Farm system ==
Level	Team	League	Manager
AAA	Phoenix Firebirds	Pacific Coast League	Bill Evers
AA	Shreveport Captains	Texas League	Bill Robinson
A	San Jose Giants	California League	Ron Wotus
A	Clinton Giants	Midwest League	Bill Stein
A-Short Season	Everett Giants	Northwest League	Norm Sherry
Rookie	AZL Giants	Arizona League	Alan Bannister
