= 1993 Montreal Expos season =

1993 Montreal Expos
- League: National League
- Division: East
- Ballpark: Olympic Stadium
- City: Montreal
- Record: 94–68
- Divisional place: 2nd
- Owners: Claude Brochu
- General managers: Dan Duquette
- Managers: Felipe Alou
- Television: CTV Television Network; The Sports Network (Dave Van Horne, Ken Singleton) SRC; RDS Network (Claude Raymond, Raymond Lebrun, Denis Casavant)
- Radio: CIQC (English) (Dave Van Horne, Bobby Winkles, Ken Singleton, Elliott Price) CKAC (French) (Jacques Doucet, Rodger Brulotte, Alain Chantelois)

The 1993 Montreal Expos season was the 25th season of the franchise. The Expos finished in second place in the National League East, with a record of 94 wins and 68 losses, three games behind the National League Champion Philadelphia Phillies.

== Offseason ==
- October 6, 1992: Jerry Willard was released by the Expos.
- November 17, 1992: Doug Bochtler was drafted from the Expos by the Colorado Rockies as the 32nd pick in the 1992 MLB expansion draft.
- December 8, 1992: Curtis Pride was signed as a free agent by the Expos.
- December 9, 1992: Mark Gardner and Doug Piatt were traded by the Expos to the Kansas City Royals for Jeff Shaw and Tim Spehr.
- March 1, 1993: Vladimir Guerrero was signed as an amateur free agent by the Expos.

== Spring training ==
The Expos held spring training at West Palm Beach Municipal Stadium in West Palm Beach, Florida – a facility they shared with the Atlanta Braves. It was their 17th season at the stadium; they had conducted spring training there from 1969 to 1972 and since 1981.

== Regular season ==
At the end of August, the Atlanta Braves tried to acquire Dennis Martínez from the Expos. The Expos placed Martinez's name on the waiver wire and the Braves claimed him. The Expos were not about to let Martinez go to Atlanta for the waiver fee of $20,000. After claiming Martinez, the Expos contacted the Braves to see if they were interested in talking about a trade. Martinez had the final word on any movement because his seniority gives him veto rights over a trade.

=== Notable games ===
- May 28, 1993: In a contest against the Chicago Cubs at Wrigley Field the Expos and Cubs end their five inning contest in a 2–2 tie.
- June 29, 1993: in a game against the visiting Pittsburgh Pirates in Montreal, Expos players Moises Alou, Marquis Grissom, and Larry Walker hit back-to-back-to-back home runs. The Expos would go on to win the game 9–2.
- September 17, 1993: One of the most exciting pennant races in team history begins, as the Expos (85 wins, 62 losses, and 1 tie) play their final series against their division rival Phillies (89 wins, 58 losses). The Expos rally back to take an 8 to 7 victory in front of 45,757 hometown fans at Montreal's Olympic Stadium. The clutch hitting hero was a hearing disabled rookie named Curtis Pride who in his first major league at-bat doubled home two runners and scored on the following play. After the game Pride said he couldn't hear the ovation but he could feel the vibration of the 45,757 Expos fans. The Expos would finish the season 94-68 but unfortunately three games out of first place.

=== Opening Day starters ===
- Moisés Alou
- Sean Berry
- Wil Cordero
- Marquis Grissom
- Ken Hill
- Tim Laker
- Mike Lansing
- John Vander Wal
- Ted Wood

=== Season standings ===
NL East
Team	W	L	Pct.	GB	Home	Road
Philadelphia Phillies	97	65	.599	—	52‍–‍29	45‍–‍36
Montreal Expos	94	68	.580	3	55‍–‍26	39‍–‍42
St. Louis Cardinals	87	75	.537	10	49‍–‍32	38‍–‍43
Chicago Cubs	84	78	.519	13	43‍–‍38	41‍–‍40
Pittsburgh Pirates	75	87	.463	22	40‍–‍41	35‍–‍46
Florida Marlins	64	98	.395	33	35‍–‍46	29‍–‍52
New York Mets	59	103	.364	38	28‍–‍53	31‍–‍50

=== Record vs. opponents ===
1993 National League record Source: MLB Standings Grid – 1993
Team	ATL	CHC	CIN	COL	FLA	HOU	LAD	MON	NYM	PHI	PIT	SD	SF	STL
Atlanta	—	7–5	10–3	13–0	7–5	8–5	8–5	7–5	9–3	6–6	7–5	9–4	7–6	6–6
Chicago	5–7	—	7–5	8–4	6–7	4–8	7–5	5–8–1	8–5	7–6	5–8	8–4	6–6	8–5
Cincinnati	3–10	5–7	—	9–4	7–5	6–7	5–8	4–8	6–6	4–8	8–4	9–4	2–11	5–7
Colorado	0–13	4–8	4–9	—	7–5	11–2	7–6	3–9	6–6	3–9	8–4	6–7	3–10	5–7
Florida	5–7	7–6	5–7	5–7	—	3–9	5–7	5–8	4–9	4–9	6–7	7–5	4–8	4–9
Houston	5–8	8–4	7–6	2–11	9–3	—	9–4	5–7	11–1	5–7	7–5	8–5	3–10	6–6
Los Angeles	5–8	5–7	8–5	6–7	7–5	4–9	—	6–6	8–4	2–10	8–4	9–4	7–6	6–6
Montreal	5–7	8–5–1	8–4	9–3	8–5	7–5	6–6	—	9–4	6–7	8–5	10–2	3–9	7–6
New York	3–9	5–8	6–6	6–6	9–4	1–11	4–8	4–9	—	3–10	4–9	5–7	4–8	5–8
Philadelphia	6-6	6–7	8–4	9–3	9–4	7–5	10–2	7–6	10–3	—	7–6	6–6	4–8	8–5
Pittsburgh	5–7	8–5	4–8	4–8	7–6	5–7	4–8	5–8	9–4	6–7	—	9–3	5–7	4–9
San Diego	4–9	4–8	4–9	7–6	5–7	5–8	4–9	2–10	7–5	6–6	3–9	—	3–10	7–5
San Francisco	6–7	6–6	11–2	10–3	8–4	10–3	6–7	9–3	8–4	8–4	7–5	10–3	—	4–8
St. Louis	6–6	5–8	7–5	7–5	9–4	6–6	6–6	6–7	8–5	5–8	9–4	5–7	8–4	—

=== Notable transactions ===
- April 14, 1993: Tim McIntosh was selected off waivers by the Expos from the Milwaukee Brewers.
- June 1, 1993: Orlando Cabrera was signed as an amateur free agent by the Expos.
- June 23, 1993: Archi Cianfrocco was traded by the Expos to the San Diego Padres for Tim Scott.
- July 16, 1993: Kent Bottenfield was traded by the Montreal Expos to the Colorado Rockies for Butch Henry.

=== Major League debuts ===
- Batters:
  - Frank Bolick (Apr 5)
  - Cliff Floyd (Sep 18)
  - Lou Frazier (Apr 8)
  - Mike Lansing (Apr 7)
  - Oreste Marrero (Aug 12)
  - Charlie Montoyo (Sep 7)
  - Curtis Pride (Sep 14)
  - Joe Siddall (Jul 28)
  - Derrick White (Jul 22)
  - Rondell White (Sep 1)
- Pitchers:
  - Brian Looney (Sep 26)
  - Kirk Rueter (Jul 7)

=== Roster ===
1993 Montreal Expos
**Roster**
**Pitchers**: 22 Scott Aldred; 41,47 Brian Barnes; 46 Kent Bottenfield; 38 Denis Boucher; 13 Jeff Fassero; 16 Mike Gardiner; 27 Butch Henry; 34 Gil Heredia; 44 Ken Hill; 38 Jimmy Jones; 53 Brian Looney; 32 Dennis Martínez; 43 Chris Nabholz; 50 Bill Risley; 27,51 Mel Rojas; 42 Kirk Rueter; 54 Tim Scott; 31 Jeff Shaw; 26 Sergio Valdez; 53 Bruce Walton; 57 John Wetteland; 20 Pete Young	**Catchers**: 24 Darrin Fletcher; 19 Tim Laker; 26 Joe Siddall; 2 Tim Spehr; **Infielders**: 5 Sean Berry; 28,55 Frank Bolick; 14 Archi Cianfrocco; 15 Greg Colbrunn; 12 Wil Cordero; 4 Delino DeShields; 30 Cliff Floyd; 3,59 Mike Lansing; 46 Oreste Marrero; 25 Charlie Montoyo; 39 Randy Ready; 23 John Vander Wal; 14 Derrick White	**Outfielders**: 18 Moisés Alou; 7 Lou Frazier; 9 Marquis Grissom; 35 Tim McIntosh; 16 Curtis Pride; 25 Matt Stairs; 33 Larry Walker; 37 Rondell White; 11 Ted Wood	**Manager**: 17 Felipe Alou; **Coaches**: 67 Pierre Arsenault (Bullpen); 21 Tommy Harper (Hitting); 1 Tim Johnson (Bench); 45 Joe Kerrigan (Pitching); 6 Jerry Manuel (Third base); 55 Luis Pujols (First base)

=== Game log ===
1993 game log
April

#	Date	Opponent	Score	Win	Loss	Save	Attendance	Record
1	April 5	@ Reds	1–0	Rijo (1–0)	**Martínez** (0–1)	Dibble (1)	55,456	0–1
2	April 7	@ Reds	5–1	**Hill** (1–0)	Smiley (0–1)	**Rojas** (1)	26,168	1–1
3	April 8	@ Reds	14–11	**Barnes** (1–0)	Henry (0–1)	**Rojas** (2)	26,280	2–1
4	April 9	@ Rockies	11–4	Smith (1–0)	**Bottenfield** (0–1)		80,227	2–2
5	April 10	@ Rockies	9–5	Nied (1–1)	**Martínez** (0–2)		65,261	2–3
6	April 11	@ Rockies	19–9	**Jones** (1–0)	Henry (0–1)		66,987	3–3
7	April 13	Astros	9–6	Williams (1–0)	**Rojas** (0–1)		51,539	3–4
8	April 14	Astros	9–5	Portugal (1–0)	**Gardiner** (0–1)		12,345	3–5
9	April 15	Astros	2–1	**Jones** (2–0)	Drabek (1–2)	**Rojas** (3)	13,377	4–5
10	April 16	Rockies	3–2	**Bottenfield** (1–1)	Henry (0–2)	**Rojas** (4)	17,483	5–5
11	April 17	Rockies	9–1	Ruffin (1–1)	**Martínez** (0–3)		23,166	5–6
12	April 18	Rockies	4–2	**Hill** (2–0)	Wayne (0–1)		25,034	6–6
13	April 20	Dodgers	7–3	**Nabholz** (1–0)	Candiotti (0–2)		10,404	7–6
14	April 21	Dodgers	6–4	**Jones** (3–0)	Astacio (0–2)	**Barnes** (1)	11,194	8–6
15	April 22	Dodgers	3–1	**Fassero** (1–0)	Hershiser (2–2)	**Rojas** (5)	10,683	9–6
16	April 23	Giants	7–2	**Martínez** (1–3)	Wilson (0–2)	**Barnes** (2)	19,401	10–6
17	April 24	Giants	6–1	**Hill** (3–0)	Burba (2–1)		22,036	11–6
18	April 25	Giants	4–1	Swift (1–1)	**Nabholz** (1–1)	Beck (6)	27,272	11–7
19	April 26	@ Padres	6–4	**Jones** (4–0)	Taylor (0–1)	**Wetteland** (1)	10,126	12–7
20	April 27	@ Padres	4–1	Benes (4–1)	**Bottenfield** (1–2)		13,692	12–8
21	April 28	@ Dodgers	6–1	Astacio (1–2)	**Martínez** (1–4)		35,896	12–9
22	April 29	@ Dodgers	7–3	**Hill** (4–0)	R. Martínez (2–3)		32,045	13–9
23	April 30	@ Giants	5–2	Swift (2–1)	**Nabholz** (1–2)		20,893	13–10

May

#	Date	Opponent	Score	Win	Loss	Save	Attendance	Record
24	May 1	@ Giants	7–3	Brantley (2–1)	**Jones** (4–1)		23,234	13–11
25	May 2	@ Giants	4 – 3 (11)	Jackson (2–1)	**Fassero** (1–1)		29,913	13–12
26	May 4	Padres	6–1	**Martínez** (2–4)	Harris (1–5)		11,739	14–12
27	May 5	Padres	6–5	**Wetteland** (1–0)	Rodriguez (1–1)		12,548	15–12
28	May 7	@ Pirates	1–0	**Nabholz** (2–2)	Tomlin (1–3)	**Wetteland** (2)	30,984	16–12
29	May 8	@ Pirates	10 – 9 (10)	Belinda (1–0)	**Bottenfield** (1–3)		33,739	16–13
30	May 9	@ Pirates	6 – 5 (11)	Minor (4–0)	**Barnes** (1–1)		17,714	16–14
31	May 11	Marlins	6–4	**Rojas** (1–1)	Carpenter (0–1)	**Wetteland** (3)	14,048	17–14
32	May 12	Marlins	10–7	Lewis (1–0)	**Nabholz** (2–3)	Harvey (11)	14,562	17–15
33	May 13	Marlins	5–4	**Wetteland** (2–0)	Corsi (0–1)		11,870	18–15
34	May 14	Mets	8–7	**Aldred** (1–0)	Innis (0–2)	**Wetteland** (4)	21,083	19–15
35	May 15	Mets	2–1	**Nabholz** (3–3)	Saberhagen (3–4)	**Barnes** (3)	24,548	20–15
36	May 16	Mets	4 – 3 (12)	**Fassero** (2–1)	Young (0–4)		22,898	21–15
37	May 17	@ Braves	5–2	Avery (3–2)	**Martínez** (2–5)	Stanton (16)	43,703	21–16
38	May 18	@ Braves	1–0	**Heredia** (1–0)	Smith (2–3)	**Wetteland** (5)	46,099	22–16
39	May 19	@ Braves	1–0	Glavine (6–0)	**Shaw** (0–1)		48,936	22–17
40	May 20	@ Phillies	9–3	Schilling (5–1)	**Nabholz** (3–4)		28,103	22–18
41	May 21	@ Phillies	6–2	**Hill** (5–0)	Jackson (4–2)	**Rojas** (6)	41,146	23–18
42	May 22	@ Phillies	6–5	**Fassero** (3–1)	Williams (1–1)	**Wetteland** (6)	37,911	24–18
43	May 23	@ Phillies	14–7	Mulholland (5–4)	**Heredia** (1–1)	West (2)	52,911	24–19
44	May 24	Cardinals	4 – 1 (11)	Cormier (2–3)	**Rojas** (1–2)	Smith (13)	11,725	24–20
45	May 25	Cardinals	4–2	**Fassero** (4–1)	Tewksbury (4–4)	**Wetteland** (7)	15,383	25–20
46	May 26	Cardinals	6–0	**Hill** (6–0)	Magrane (2–5)		14,766	26–20
47	May 28	@ Cubs	2 – 2 (5)				28,523	26–20
48	May 29	@ Cubs	5–4	**Martínez** (3–5)	Scanlan (1–3)	**Wetteland** (8)	36,740	27–20
49	May 30	@ Cubs	5–2	Bautista (1–0)	**Shaw** (0–2)		36,767	27–21
50	May 31	@ Astros	2–1	Jones (2–4)	**Rojas** (1–3)		21,176	27–22

June

#	Date	Opponent	Score	Win	Loss	Save	Attendance	Record
51	June 1	@ Astros	2–1	**Wetteland** (3–0)	Drabek (5–6)		21,132	28–22
52	June 2	@ Astros	5–4	Jones (3–4)	**Rojas** (1–4)		21,405	28–23
53	June 3	Cubs	7–1	**Martínez** (4–5)	Morgan (3–7)		15,507	29–23
54	June 4	Cubs	3–1	**Shaw** (1–2)	Guzmán (4–5)	**Wetteland** (9)	22,786	30–23
55	June 5	Cubs	6–3	**Fassero** (5–1)	Bautista (1–1)	**Wetteland** (10)	20,209	31–23
56	June 6	Cubs	4–1	Hibbard (7–3)	**Hill** (6–1)	Myers (17)	16,404	31–24
57	June 7	Reds	12–3	Smiley (3–7)	**Heredia** (1–2)		10,023	31–25
58	June 8	Reds	4–2	**Martínez** (5–5)	Pugh (3–7)	**Wetteland** (11)	11,777	32–25
59	June 9	Reds	3 – 2 (12)	Cadaret (2–1)	**Gardiner** (0–2)	Ayala (2)	11,157	32–26
60	June 10	@ Cardinals	7–4	Tewksbury (5–6)	**Rojas** (1–5)	Smith (17)	26,193	32–27
61	June 11	@ Cardinals	1–0	Magrane (4–6)	**Bottenfield** (1–4)	Smith (18)	34,957	32–28
62	June 12	@ Cardinals	13–3	Cormier (3–3)	**Nabholz** (3–5)		49,804	32–29
63	June 13	@ Cardinals	3–1	**Martínez** (6–5)	Arocha (5–1)	**Wetteland** (12)	34,351	33–29
64	June 14	Phillies	10–3	Mulholland (8–5)	**Shaw** (1–3)		13,235	33–30
65	June 15	Phillies	8–4	**Barnes** (2–1)	Greene (8–1)		13,142	34–30
66	June 16	Phillies	4 – 3 (10)	**Rojas** (2–5)	West (1–2)		14,231	35–30
67	June 18	Braves	2–1	**Martínez** (7–5)	Smoltz (6–6)	**Wetteland** (13)	19,519	36–30
68	June 19	Braves	4–3	Wohlers (1–0)	**Rojas** (2–6)	Stanton (20)	27,939	36–31
69	June 20	Braves	5–1	Glavine (9–3)	**Shaw** (1–4)		33,135	36–32
70	June 21	@ Mets	8–3	Telgheder (1–0)	**Barnes** (2–2)	Maddux (3)	21,279	36–33
71	June 22	@ Mets	6–3	**Rojas** (3–6)	Young (0–9)	**Wetteland** (14)	22,036	37–33
72	June 23	@ Mets	4–3	**Martínez** (8–5)	Tanana (4–7)	**Wetteland** (15)	22,786	38–33
73	June 25	@ Marlins	3–1	Armstrong (5–8)	**Hill** (6–2)	Harvey (22)	41,748	38–34
74	June 26	@ Marlins	4–2	**Bottenfield** (2–4)	Hough (3–8)	**Wetteland** (16)	43,321	39–34
75	June 27	@ Marlins	9–2	Hammond (9–4)	**Barnes** (2–3)		40,649	39–35
76	June 28	Pirates	9 – 5 (10)	Wakefield (4–7)	**Scott** (2–1)		17,185	39–36
77	June 29	Pirates	9–2	**Nabholz** (4–5)	Wagner (3–4)		14,023	40–36
78	June 30	Pirates	9–1	**Gardiner** (1–2)	Neagle (2–3)	**Fassero** (1)	15,734	41–36

July

#	Date	Opponent	Score	Win	Loss	Save	Attendance	Record
79	July 1	Pirates	7–5	**Rojas** (4–6)	Cooke (5–4)	**Wetteland** (17)	13,174	42–36
80	July 2	Dodgers	4–3	R.Martínez (7–4)	**Barnes** (2–4)	Gott (14)	23,368	42–37
81	July 3	Dodgers	6–4	**Martínez** (9–5)	Gross (6–7)	**Wetteland** (18)	22,979	43–37
82	July 4	Dodgers	1 – 0 (11)	Gott (3–5)	**Shaw** (1–5)	McDowell (2)	20,773	43–38
83	July 5	Giants	10–4	Burkett (13–2)	**Gardiner** (1–3)		13,411	43–39
84	July 6	Giants	13–5	Hickerson (2–1)	**Bottenfield** (2–5)		13,172	43–40
85	July 7	Giants	3–0	**Rueter** (1–0)	Brummett (1–2)	**Wetteland** (19)	13,593	44–40
86	July 8	Padres	5–4	**Martínez** (10–5)	Greg Harris (8–9)	**Wetteland** (20)	12,727	45–40
87	July 9	Padres	6–1	**Nabholz** (5–5)	Worrell (0–3)		14,251	46–40
88	July 10	Padres	3–2	**Young** (1–0)	Gene Harris (4–2)		30,369	47–40
89	July 11	Padres	5–4	**Wetteland** (4–0)	Gene Harris (4–3)	**Martínez** (1)	21,174	48–40
90	July 15	@ Dodgers	3–2	R. Martínez (8–4)	**Martínez** (10–6)	Gott (17)	40,368	48–41
91	July 16	@ Dodgers	2–1	P. Martínez (7–2)	**Wetteland** (4–1)		39,878	48–42
92	July 17	@ Dodgers	9 – 6 (10)	**Gardiner** (2–3)	Daal (1–2)	**Wetteland** (21)	44,606	49–42
93	July 18	@ Dodgers	2–1	Candiotti (4–5)	**Shaw** (1–6)	P. Martínez (2)	35,321	49–43
94	July 19	@ Giants	6–2	Burba (7–2)	**Nabholz** (5–6)		16,562	49–44
95	July 20	@ Giants	8–3	Swift (13–5)	**Martínez** (10–7)		18,764	49–45
96	July 21	@ Giants	4–3	Hickerson (5–1)	**Rojas** (4–7)	Beck (26)	18,791	49–46
97	July 22	@ Padres	10–5	**Hill** (7–2)	Benes (10–7)		10,701	50–46
98	July 23	@ Padres	5–0	**Fassero** (6–1)	Brocail (2–6)	**Rojas** (7)	14,754	51–46
99	July 24	@ Padres	11–4	Worrell (1–3)	**Nabholz** (5–7)		14,053	51–47
100	July 25	@ Padres	5 – 4 (10)	**Wetteland** (5–1)	Gene Harris (4–5)	**Rojas** (8)	21,586	52–47
101	July 27	@ Pirates	8–6	**Scott** (3–1)	Johnston (0–1)	**Wetteland** (22)	14,128	53–47
102	July 28	@ Pirates	3–2	Petkovsek (2–0)	**Shaw** (1–7)		13,470	53–48
103	July 29	@ Pirates	3 – 2 (11)	**Wetteland** (6–1)	Minor (6–4)	**Heredia** (1)	18,823	54–48
104	July 30	Marlins	11–1	**Nabholz** (6–7)	Bowen (6–10)		22,002	55–48
105	July 31	Marlins	6–5	**Wetteland** (7–1)	Turner (1–3)		36,558	56–48

August

#	Date	Opponent	Score	Win	Loss	Save	Attendance	Record
106	August 1	Marlins	5–4	Turner (2–3)	**Barnes** (2–5)	Harvey (31)	24,162	56–49
107	August 2	Mets	4–3	Saberhagen (7–7)	**Hill** (7–3)	Franco (8)	16,005	56–50
108	August 3	Mets	3–1	**Fassero** (7–1)	Tanana (5–11)	**Wetteland** (23)	17,401	57–50
109	August 4	Mets	3–1	**Nabholz** (7–7)	Fernandez (1–2)	**Wetteland** (24)	17,906	58–50
110	August 5	Mets	12 – 9 (13)	Draper (1–1)	**Wetteland** (24)	Young (2)	26,404	58–51
111	August 6	@ Braves	8–2	**Rueter** (2–0)	Smoltz (10–9)		48,564	59–51
112	August 7	@ Braves	5 – 3 (10)	**Scott** (4–1)	Stanton (4–4)	**Wetteland** (25)	48,626	60–51
113	August 8	@ Braves	3–2	Avery (12–4)	**Fassero** (7–2)	McMichael (5)	48,710	60–52
114	August 10	@ Phillies	5–2	Schilling (10–6)	**Nabholz** (7–8)		43,104	60–53
115	August 11	@ Phillies	6–5	West (4–3)	**Wetteland** (7–3)		45,260	60–54
116	August 12	@ Phillies	7–4	Mason (4–8)	**Scott** (4–2)	Williams (31)	45,002	60–55
117	August 13	Cardinals	4 – 3 (11)	**Wetteland** (8–3)	Magrane (8–10)		21,212	61–55
118	August 14	Cardinals	2–0	Watson (6–0)	**Fassero** (7–3)	Smith (40)	25,820	61–56
119	August 15	Cardinals	7–1	**Heredia** (2–2)	Arocha (10–4)		25,209	62–56
120	August 17	@ Cubs	7–2	Guzmán (11–7)	**Martínez** (10–8)			62–57
121	August 17	@ Cubs	6–4	**Rueter** (3–0)	Harkey (8–7)	**Wetteland** (26)	32,723	63–57
122	August 18	@ Cubs	2–0	Hibbard (10–9)	**Hill** (7–4)	Bautista (1)	30,661	63–58
123	August 19	@ Cubs	10–2	**Fassero** (8–3)	Castillo (5–8)		37,944	64–58
124	August 20	@ Reds	4–2	Reardon (3–4)	**Rojas** (4–8)	Dibble (18)	31,022	64–59
125	August 21	@ Reds	6–3	**Henry** (3–8)	Roper (2–3)	**Wetteland** (27)	34,393	65–59
126	August 22	@ Reds	7–2	**Martínez** (11–8)	Ayala (5–6)		30,655	66–59
127	August 23	Cubs	1–0	**Rueter** (4–0)	Hibbard (10–10)	**Wetteland** (28)	15,359	67–59
128	August 24	Cubs	6–5	Plesac (1–1)	**Hill** (7–5)	Myers (37)	16,360	67–60
129	August 25	Cubs	7–3	**Fassero** (9–3)	Morgan (8–12)	**Wetteland** (29)	18,151	68–60
130	August 27	Astros	3–1	**Martínez** (12–8)	Drabek (7–15)	**Wetteland** (30)	16,429	69–60
131	August 28	Astros	7–3	**Rueter** (5–0)	Kile (14–5)	**Rojas** (9)	24,203	70–60
132	August 29	Astros	3–2	**Hill** (8–5)	Swindell (10–10)	**Wetteland** (31)	20,701	71–60
133	August 30	@ Rockies	6–1	**Fassero** (10–3)	Sanford (1–2)	**Rojas** (10)	47,699	72–60
134	August 31	@ Rockies	14–3	**Heredia** (3–2)	Harris (11–14)		46,288	73–60

September

#	Date	Opponent	Score	Win	Loss	Save	Attendance	Record
135	September 1	@ Rockies	11–3	**Martínez** (13–8)	Bottenfield (4–10)		46,781	74–60
136	September 3	@ Astros	3–0	**Rueter** (6–0)	Kile (14–6)	**Wetteland** (32)	28,257	75–60
137	September 4	@ Astros	7–5	**Hill** (9–5)	Swindell (10–11)	**Wetteland** (33)	22,771	76–60
138	September 5	@ Astros	7–1	Portugal (14–4)	**Fassero** (10–4)		19,636	76–61
139	September 6	Rockies	4–3	**Scott** (5–2)	Reed (7–5)	**Wetteland** (34)	40,066	77–61
140	September 7	Rockies	4–3	**Martínez** (14–8)	Moore (2–1)	**Wetteland** (35)	18,988	78–61
141	September 8	Rockies	6–1	**Rueter** (7–0)	Reynoso (9–10)	**Scott** (1)	10,764	79–61
142	September 10	Reds	4 – 3 (10)	**Rojas** (5–8)	Dibble (1–3)		16,420	80–61
143	September 11	Reds	4–2	**Boucher** (1–0)	Powell (0–1)	**Wetteland** (36)	29,353	81–61
144	September 12	Reds	3–2	**Wetteland** (9–3)	Service (2–1)		21,055	82–61
145	September 14	@ Cardinals	12–9	**Rueter** (8–0)	Watson (6–5)	**Wetteland** (37)	21,515	83–61
146	September 15	@ Cardinals	5–4	Pérez (6–2)	**Barnes** (2–6)		21,514	83–62
147	September 16	@ Cardinals	4–3	**Fassero** (11–4)	Tewksbury (17–9)	**Wetteland** (38)	28,565	84–62
148	September 17	Phillies	8 – 7 (12)	**Scott** (6–2)	Williams (3–5)		45,757	85–62
149	September 18	Phillies	5–4	Greene (15–3)	**Boucher** (1–1)	Williams (39)	50,438	85–63
150	September 19	Phillies	6–5	**Scott** (7–2)	Williams (3–6)		40,047	86–63
151	September 21	Braves	18–5	Smoltz (15–10)	**Hill** (9–6)		30,585	86–64
152	September 22	Braves	6–1	**Fassero** (12–4)	Avery (16–6)		18,132	87–64
153	September 23	Braves	6–3	Maddux (19–9)	**Martínez** (14–9)		25,219	87–65
154	September 24	@ Mets	6–3	**Nabholz** (8–8)	Jones (2–4)	**Wetteland** (39)	17,842	88–65
155	September 25	@ Mets	4–1	**Boucher** (2–1)	Hillman (1–9)	**Heredia** (2)	19,728	89–65
156	September 26	@ Mets	9–3	Telgheder (5–2)	**Hill** (9–7)		21,558	89–66
157	September 27	@ Marlins	3–1	Rapp (4–5)	**Fassero** (12–5)	Rodriguez (3)	30,048	89–67
158	September 28	@ Marlins	3–2	**Martínez** (15–9)	Armstrong (9–16)	**Wetteland** (40)	27,017	90–67
159	September 29	@ Marlins	7–1	**Nabholz** (9–8)	Hammond (11–12)		26,579	91–67
160	September 30	@ Marlins	5–3	**Shaw** (2–7)	Lewis (6–3)	**Wetteland** (41)	25,190	92–67

October

#	Date	Opponent	Score	Win	Loss	Save	Attendance	Record
161	October 1	Pirates	6–3	**Heredia** (4–2)	Wagner (8–8)	**Wetteland** (42)	14,148	93–67
162	October 2	Pirates	4–2	Ballard (4–1)	**Henry** (3–9)	Dewey (7)	16,126	93–68
163	October 3	Pirates	3–1	**Boucher** (3–1)	Hope (0–2)	**Wetteland** (43)	26,277	94–68

Legend: = Win = Loss
Bold = Expos team member

== Player stats ==
=== Batting ===
==== Starters by position ====
Note: Pos = Position; G = Games played; AB = At bats; H = Hits; Avg. = Batting average; HR = Home runs; RBI = Runs batted in

Pos	Player	G	AB	H	Avg.	HR	RBI
C	Darrin Fletcher	133	396	101	.255	9	60
1B	Greg Colbrunn	70	153	39	.255	4	23
2B	Delino DeShields	123	481	142	.295	2	29
3B	Sean Berry	122	299	78	.261	14	49
SS	Wil Cordero	138	475	118	.248	10	58
LF	Moisés Alou	136	482	138	.286	18	85
CF	Marquis Grissom	157	630	188	.298	19	95
RF	Larry Walker	138	490	130	.265	22	86

==== Other batters ====
Note: G = Games played; AB = At bats; H = Hits; Avg. = Batting average; HR = Home runs; RBI = Runs batted in

Player	G	AB	H	Avg.	HR	RBI
Mike Lansing	141	491	141	.287	3	45
John Vander Wal	106	215	50	.233	5	30
Frank Bolick	95	213	45	.211	4	24
Lou Frazier	112	189	54	.286	1	16
Randy Ready	40	134	34	.254	1	10
Tim Spehr	53	87	20	.230	2	10
Tim Laker	43	86	17	.198	0	7
Oreste Marrero	32	81	17	.210	1	4
Rondell White	23	73	19	.260	2	15
Derrick White	17	49	11	.224	2	4
Cliff Floyd	10	31	7	.226	1	2
Ted Wood	13	26	5	.192	0	3
Tim McIntosh	20	21	2	.095	0	2
Joe Siddall	19	20	2	.100	0	1
Archi Cianfrocco	12	17	4	.235	1	1
Curtis Pride	10	9	4	.444	1	5
Matt Stairs	6	8	3	.375	0	2
Charlie Montoyo	4	5	2	.400	0	3

=== Pitching ===
==== Starting pitchers ====
Note: G = Games pitched; IP = Innings pitched; W = Wins; L = Losses; ERA = Earned run average; SO = Strikeouts

Player	G	IP	W	L	ERA	SO
Dennis Martínez	35	224.2	15	9	3.85	138
Ken Hill	28	183.2	9	7	3.23	90
Chris Nabholz	26	116.2	9	8	4.09	74
Kirk Rueter	14	85.2	8	0	2.73	31
Denis Boucher	5	28.1	3	1	1.91	14

==== Other pitchers ====
Note: G = Games pitched; IP = Innings pitched; W = Wins; L = Losses; ERA = Earned run average; SO = Strikeouts

Player	G	IP	W	L	ERA	SO
Jeff Fassero	56	149.2	12	5	2.29	140
Brian Barnes	52	100.0	2	6	4.41	60
Jeff Shaw	55	95.2	2	7	4.14	50
Kent Bottenfield	23	83.0	2	5	4.12	33
Gil Heredia	20	57.1	4	2	3.92	40
Jimmy Jones	12	39.2	4	1	6.35	21
Butch Henry	10	18.1	1	1	3.93	8
Brian Looney	3	6.0	0	0	3.00	7

==== Relief pitchers ====
Note: G = Games pitched; W = Wins; L = Losses; SV = Saves; ERA = Earned run average; SO = Strikeouts

Player	G	W	L	SV	ERA	SO
John Wetteland	70	9	3	43	1.37	113
Mel Rojas	66	5	8	10	2.95	48
Tim Scott	32	5	2	1	3.71	35
Mike Gardiner	24	2	3	0	5.21	21
Bruce Walton	4	0	0	0	9.53	0
Pete Young	4	1	0	0	3.38	3
Sergio Valdez	4	0	0	0	9.00	2
Scott Aldred	3	1	0	0	6.75	4
Bill Risley	2	0	0	0	6.00	2

== Award winners ==
- Larry Walker, Rawlings Gold Glove Award at outfield
- Ken Hill, Pitcher of the Month, April
- John Wetteland, Pitcher of the Month, September

1993 Major League Baseball All-Star Game

- Marquis Grissom, outfield, reserve

== Farm system ==
Level	Team	League	Manager
AAA	Ottawa Lynx	International League	Mike Quade
AA	Harrisburg Senators	Eastern League	Jim Tracy
A	West Palm Beach Expos	Florida State League	Rob Leary
A	Burlington Bees	Midwest League	Lorenzo Bundy
A-Short Season	Jamestown Expos	New York–Penn League	Tim Torricelli
Rookie	GCL Expos	Gulf Coast League	Nelson Norman

LEAGUE CHAMPIONS: Harrisburg
