= 1993 San Diego Padres season =

1993 San Diego Padres
- League: National League
- Division: West
- Ballpark: Jack Murphy Stadium
- City: San Diego, California
- Record: 61–101 (.377)
- Divisional place: 7th
- Owners: Tom Werner
- General managers: Joe McIlvaine, Randy Smith
- Managers: Jim Riggleman
- Television: KUSI-TV; San Diego Cable Sports Network(Jerry Coleman, Ted Leitner, Bob Chandler); XHBJ-TV (Rafael Munoz Oretga, Victor Villa Silvas)
- Radio: KFMB (AM) (Bob Chandler, Jerry Coleman, Ted Leitner); XEXX (Mario Thomas Zapiain, Matias Santos, Eduardo Ortega)

The 1993 San Diego Padres season was the 25th season in franchise history.

== Offseason ==
- October 8, 1992: Phil Stephenson was released by the Padres.
- October 26, 1992: Tony Fernández was traded by the Padres to the New York Mets for Wally Whitehurst, D. J. Dozier, and a player to be named later. The Mets completed the deal by sending Raul Casanova to the Padres on December 7.
- November 20, 1992: Jarvis Brown was signed as a free agent by the Padres.
- December 2, 1992: Bob Geren was signed as a free agent by the Padres.
- December 9, 1992: José Meléndez was traded by the Padres to the Boston Red Sox for Phil Plantier.
- December 10, 1992: Jim Pena was traded by the San Francisco Giants to the San Diego Padres for Paul Faries.
- December 17, 1992: Roger Mason was traded by the New York Mets with Mike Freitas (minors) to the San Diego Padres for Mike Maddux.
- March 30, 1993: Darrin Jackson was traded by the Padres to the Toronto Blue Jays for Derek Bell.

== Regular season ==
=== Opening Day starters ===
- Derek Bell
- Tony Gwynn
- Greg Harris
- Fred McGriff
- Phil Plantier
- Gary Sheffield
- Craig Shipley
- Tim Teufel
- Dan Walters

=== Season standings ===
NL West
Team	W	L	Pct.	GB	Home	Road
Atlanta Braves	104	58	.642	—	51‍–‍30	53‍–‍28
San Francisco Giants	103	59	.636	1	50‍–‍31	53‍–‍28
Houston Astros	85	77	.525	19	44‍–‍37	41‍–‍40
Los Angeles Dodgers	81	81	.500	23	41‍–‍40	40‍–‍41
Cincinnati Reds	73	89	.451	31	41‍–‍40	32‍–‍49
Colorado Rockies	67	95	.414	37	39‍–‍42	28‍–‍53
San Diego Padres	61	101	.377	43	34‍–‍47	27‍–‍54

=== Record vs. opponents ===
1993 National League record Source: MLB Standings Grid – 1993
Team	ATL	CHC	CIN	COL	FLA	HOU	LAD	MON	NYM	PHI	PIT	SD	SF	STL
Atlanta	—	7–5	10–3	13–0	7–5	8–5	8–5	7–5	9–3	6–6	7–5	9–4	7–6	6–6
Chicago	5–7	—	7–5	8–4	6–7	4–8	7–5	5–8–1	8–5	7–6	5–8	8–4	6–6	8–5
Cincinnati	3–10	5–7	—	9–4	7–5	6–7	5–8	4–8	6–6	4–8	8–4	9–4	2–11	5–7
Colorado	0–13	4–8	4–9	—	7–5	11–2	7–6	3–9	6–6	3–9	8–4	6–7	3–10	5–7
Florida	5–7	7–6	5–7	5–7	—	3–9	5–7	5–8	4–9	4–9	6–7	7–5	4–8	4–9
Houston	5–8	8–4	7–6	2–11	9–3	—	9–4	5–7	11–1	5–7	7–5	8–5	3–10	6–6
Los Angeles	5–8	5–7	8–5	6–7	7–5	4–9	—	6–6	8–4	2–10	8–4	9–4	7–6	6–6
Montreal	5–7	8–5–1	8–4	9–3	8–5	7–5	6–6	—	9–4	6–7	8–5	10–2	3–9	7–6
New York	3–9	5–8	6–6	6–6	9–4	1–11	4–8	4–9	—	3–10	4–9	5–7	4–8	5–8
Philadelphia	6-6	6–7	8–4	9–3	9–4	7–5	10–2	7–6	10–3	—	7–6	6–6	4–8	8–5
Pittsburgh	5–7	8–5	4–8	4–8	7–6	5–7	4–8	5–8	9–4	6–7	—	9–3	5–7	4–9
San Diego	4–9	4–8	4–9	7–6	5–7	5–8	4–9	2–10	7–5	6–6	3–9	—	3–10	7–5
San Francisco	6–7	6–6	11–2	10–3	8–4	10–3	6–7	9–3	8–4	8–4	7–5	10–3	—	4–8
St. Louis	6–6	5–8	7–5	7–5	9–4	6–6	6–6	6–7	8–5	5–8	9–4	5–7	8–4	—

=== Notable transactions ===
- June 1, 1993: Jeremy Hernandez was traded by the Padres to the Cleveland Indians for Fernando Hernández and Tracy Sanders (minors).
- June 3, 1993: Derrek Lee was drafted by the Padres in the 1st round (14th pick) of the 1993 Major League Baseball draft. Player signed July 20, 1993.
- June 23, 1993: Tim Scott was traded by the Padres to the Montreal Expos for Archi Cianfrocco.
- June 24, 1993: Gary Sheffield and Rich Rodriguez were traded by the Padres to the Florida Marlins for Trevor Hoffman, José Martínez, and Andrés Berumen.
- July 3, 1993: Roger Mason was traded by the Padres to the Philadelphia Phillies for Tim Mauser.
- July 10, 1993: Mark Davis was signed as a free agent by the Padres.
- July 18, 1993: Fred McGriff was traded by the Padres to the Atlanta Braves for Melvin Nieves, Donnie Elliott, and Vince Moore (minors).
- July 26, 1993: Bruce Hurst and Greg Harris were traded by the Padres to the Colorado Rockies for Brad Ausmus, Doug Bochtler and a player to be named later. The Rockies completed the deal by sending Andy Ashby to the Padres on July 27.

=== Roster ===
1993 San Diego Padres
Roster
Pitchers: 43 Andy Ashby; 40 Andy Benes; 49 Doug Brocail; 45 Mark Davis; 45 Dave Eiland; 50 Mark Ettles; 39 Pat Gomez; 33 Gene Harris; 46 Greg Harris; 50 Jeremy Hernandez; 34 Trevor Hoffman; 47 Bruce Hurst; 42 Pedro Martínez; 48 Roger Mason; 52 Tim Mauser; 42 Rich Rodriguez; 27 Scott Sanders; 54 Tim Scott; 54 Rudy Seánez; 44 Frank Seminara; 37 Kerry Taylor; 41 Wally Whitehurst; 58 Tim Worrell	Catchers: 11 Brad Ausmus; 17 Bob Geren; 25 Kevin Higgins; 11 Dan Walters; Infielders: 26 Archi Cianfrocco; 12 Jeff Gardner; 7 Ricky Gutiérrez; 1 Luis López; 29 Fred McGriff; 10 Gary Sheffield; 18 Craig Shipley; 28 Dave Staton; 15 Kurt Stillwell; 20 Tim Teufel; 23 Guillermo Velasquez	Outfielders: 21 Billy Bean; 4 Derek Bell; 17 Jarvis Brown; 30 Phil Clark; 19 Tony Gwynn; 10 Melvin Nieves; 24 Phil Plantier; 3 Darrell Sherman	Manager: 8 Jim Riggleman; Coaches: 32 Dave Bialas (bullpen); 13 Bruce Bochy (third base); 5 Rob Picciolo (bench); 22 Dan Radison (first base); 16 Merv Rettenmund (hitting); 36 Mike Roarke (pitching)

== Player stats ==
= Indicates team leader

=== Batting ===
==== Starters by position ====
Note: G = Games played; AB = At bats; R = Runs; H = Hits; Avg. = Batting average; HR = Home runs; RBI = Runs batted in

Pos	Player	G	AB	R	H	Avg.	HR	RBI	SB
C	Kevin Higgins	71	181	17	40	.221	0	13	0
1B	Fred McGriff	83	302	52	83	.275	18	46	4
2B	Jeff Gardner	140	404	53	106	.262	1	24	2
3B	Gary Sheffield	68	258	34	76	.295	10	36	5
SS	Ricky Gutiérrez	133	438	76	110	.251	5	26	4
LF	Phil Plantier	138	462	67	111	.240	34	100	4
CF	Derek Bell	150	542	73	142	.262	21	72	26
RF	Tony Gwynn	122	489	70	175	.358	7	59	14

==== Other batters ====
Note: G = Games played; AB = At bats; R = Runs; H = Hits; Avg. = Batting average; HR = Home runs; RBI = Runs batted in; SB = Stolen bases

Player	G	AB	R	H	Avg.	HR	RBI	SB
Archi Cianfrocco	84	279	27	68	.244	11	47	2
Phil Clark	102	240	33	75	.313	9	33	2
Craig Shipley	105	230	25	54	.235	4	22	12
Tim Teufel	96	200	26	50	.250	7	31	2
Billy Bean	88	177	19	46	.260	5	32	2
Brad Ausmus	49	160	18	41	.256	5	12	2
Bob Geren	58	145	8	31	.214	3	6	0
Guillermo Velasquez	79	143	7	30	.210	3	20	0
Jarvis Brown	47	133	21	31	.233	0	8	3
Kurt Stillwell	57	121	9	26	.215	1	11	4
Dan Walters	27	94	6	19	.202	1	10	0
Darrell Sherman	37	63	8	14	.222	0	2	2
Melvin Nieves	19	47	4	9	.191	2	3	0
Luis López	17	43	1	5	.116	0	1	0
Dave Staton	17	42	7	11	.262	5	9	0

=== Pitching ===
==== Starting pitchers ====
Note: G = Games pitched; IP = Innings pitched; W = Wins; L = Losses; ERA = Earned run average; SO = Strikeouts

Player	G	IP	W	L	ERA	SO
Andy Benes	34	230.2	15	15	3.78	179
Greg Harris	22	152.0	10	9	3.67	83
Doug Brocail	24	128.1	4	13	4.56	70
Wally Whitehurst	21	105.2	4	7	3.83	57
Tim Worrell	21	100.2	2	7	4.92	52
Andy Ashby	12	69.0	3	6	5.48	44
Scott Sanders	9	52.1	3	3	4.13	37
Dave Eiland	10	48.1	0	3	5.21	14
Bruce Hurst	2	4.1	0	1	12.46	3

==== Other pitchers ====
Note" G = Games pitched; IP = Innings pitched; W = Wins; L = Losses; ERA = Earned run average; SO = Strikeouts

Player	G	IP	W	L	ERA	SO
Kerry Taylor	36	68.1	0	5	6.45	45
Frank Seminara	18	46.1	3	3	4.47	22

==== Relief pitchers ====
Note: G = Games pitched; W = Wins; L = Losses; SV = Saves; ERA = Earned run average; SO = Strikeouts

Player	G	W	L	SV	ERA	SO
Gene Harris	59	6	6	23	3.03	39
Trevor Hoffman	39	2	4	3	4.31	53
Mark Davis	35	0	3	4	3.52	42
Roger Mason	34	0	7	0	3.24	39
Rich Rodriguez	34	2	3	2	3.30	22
Pedro Martínez	32	3	1	0	2.43	32
Tim Mauser	28	0	1	0	3.58	32
Pat Gomez	27	1	2	0	5.12	26
Tim Scott	24	2	0	0	2.39	30
Jeremy Hernandez	21	0	2	0	4.72	26
Mark Ettles	14	1	0	0	6.50	9
Rudy Seánez	3	0	0	0	13.50	1

== Award winners ==
1993 Major League Baseball All-Star Game

== Farm system ==
Level	Team	League	Manager
AAA	Las Vegas Stars	Pacific Coast League	Russ Nixon
AA	Wichita Wranglers	Texas League	Dave Trembley
A	Rancho Cucamonga Quakes	California League	Keith Champion
A	Waterloo Diamonds	Midwest League	Ed Romero
A-Short Season	Spokane Indians	Northwest League	Tim Flannery
Rookie	AZL Padres	Arizona League	Ken Berry
