= 1995 Montreal Expos season =

1995 Montreal Expos
- League: National League
- Division: East
- Ballpark: Olympic Stadium
- City: Montreal
- Record: 66–78
- Divisional place: 5th
- Owners: Claude Brochu
- General managers: Kevin Malone
- Managers: Felipe Alou
- Television: CBC Television/CTV Television Network; The Sports Network (Dave Van Horne, Ken Singleton); TQS (Michel Villeneuve, Marc Griffin); SRC (Claude Raymond, Camille Dube); RDS Network (Denis Casavant, Alain Chantelois)
- Radio: CIQC (Dave Van Horne, Ken Singleton, Elliott Price); CKAC (AM) (Jacques Doucet, Rodger Brulotte, Alain Chantelois)

The 1995 Montreal Expos season was the 27th season in franchise history. They finished the season with a record of 66–78, a last place finish and 24 games behind the World Series champion Atlanta Braves.

== Offseason ==
- March 29, 1995: Greg A. Harris was signed as a free agent with the Montreal Expos.

== Spring training ==
The Expos held spring training at West Palm Beach Municipal Stadium in West Palm Beach, Florida – a facility they shared with the Atlanta Braves. It was their 19th season at the stadium; they had conducted spring training there from 1969 to 1972 and since 1981.

== Regular season ==
- June 3, 1995 – Pedro Martínez pitched 9 perfect innings against the San Diego Padres before giving up a hit in the 10th to notorious Expo-killer Bip Roberts over the head of Tony Tarasco in right field. He became the second pitcher in history, after Harvey Haddix, to have a perfect game broken up in extra innings.
- June 11, 1995 – Rondell White had a career day in Candlestick Park against the San Francisco Giants. White picks up 6 hits and hits for the cycle. A crowd of 22,392 was on hand.

=== Season standings ===
NL East
Team	W	L	Pct.	GB	Home	Road
Atlanta Braves	90	54	.625	—	44‍–‍28	46‍–‍26
New York Mets	69	75	.479	21	40‍–‍32	29‍–‍43
Philadelphia Phillies	69	75	.479	21	35‍–‍37	34‍–‍38
Florida Marlins	67	76	.469	22½	37‍–‍34	30‍–‍42
Montreal Expos	66	78	.458	24	31‍–‍41	35‍–‍37

=== Record vs. opponents ===
1995 National League record Source: MLB Standings Grid – 1995
Team	ATL	CHC	CIN	COL	FLA	HOU	LAD	MON	NYM	PHI	PIT	SD	SF	STL
Atlanta	—	8–4	8–5	9–4	10–3	6–6	5–4	9–4	5–8	7–6	4–2	5–2	7–1	7–5
Chicago	4–8	—	3–7	6–7	8–4	5–8	7–5	3–5	4–3	6–1	8–5	5–7	5–7	9–4
Cincinnati	5–8	7–3	—	5–7	6–6	12–1	4–3	8–4	7–5	9–3	8–5	3–6	3–3	8–5
Colorado	4–9	7–6	7–5	—	5–7	4–4	4–9	7–1	5–4	4–2	8–4	9–4	8–5	5–7
Florida	3–10	4–8	6–6	7–5	—	8–4	3–7	6–7	7–6	6–7	5–8	3–2	5–3	4–3
Houston	6–6	8–5	1–12	4–4	4–8	—	3–2	9–3	6–6	5–7	9–4	7–4	5–3	9–4
Los Angeles	4–5	5–7	3–4	9–4	7–3	2–3	—	7–5	6–6	4–9	9–4	7–6	8–5	7–5
Montreal	4–9	5–3	4–8	1–7	7–6	3–9	5–7	—	7–6	8–5	4–4	7–5	7–6	4–3
New York	8–5	3–4	5–7	4–5	6–7	6–6	6–6	6–7	—	7–6	4–3	6–7	5–8	3–4
Philadelphia	6-7	1–6	3–9	2–4	7–6	7–5	9–4	5–8	6–7	—	6–3	6–6	6–6	5–4
Pittsburgh	2–4	5–8	5–8	4–8	8–5	4–9	4–9	4–4	3–4	3–6	—	4–8	6–6	6–7
San Diego	2–5	7–5	6–3	4–9	2–3	4–7	6–7	5–7	7–6	6–6	8–4	—	6–7	7–5
San Francisco	1–7	7–5	3–3	5–8	3–5	3–5	5–8	6–7	8–5	6–6	6–6	7–6	—	7–6
St. Louis	5–7	4–9	5–8	7–5	3–4	4-9	5–7	3–4	4–3	4–5	7–6	5–7	6–7	—

=== Opening Day starters ===
- Moisés Alou
- Shane Andrews
- Sean Berry
- Wil Cordero
- Jeff Fassero
- Roberto Kelly
- Tim Laker
- Mike Lansing
- Rondell White

=== Notable transactions ===
- April 5, 1995: Ken Hill was traded by the Montreal Expos to the St. Louis Cardinals for Kirk Bullinger, Bryan Eversgerd, and Da Rond Stovall.
- April 5, 1995: John Wetteland was traded by the Montreal Expos to the New York Yankees for Fernando Seguignol
- April 6, 1995: Marquis Grissom was traded by the Montreal Expos to the Atlanta Braves for Tony Tarasco, Esteban Yan, and Roberto Kelly.
- May 23, 1995: Henry Rodriguez was traded by the Los Angeles Dodgers with Jeff Treadway to the Montreal Expos for Joey Eischen and Roberto Kelly.
- June 1, 1995: Pete Laforest was drafted by the Montreal Expos in the 16th round of the 1995 amateur draft. Player signed June 5, 1995.
- June 1, 1995: Future Super Bowl MVP Tom Brady was drafted by the Montreal Expos in the 18th round (507th pick) of the 1995 amateur draft. Brady was drafted out of Serra High School.
- June 9, 1995: Rafael Bournigal was traded by the Los Angeles Dodgers to the Montreal Expos for Kris Foster.
- July 16, 1995: Dave Silvestri was traded by the New York Yankees to the Montreal Expos for Tyrone Horne (minors).

=== Roster ===
1995 Montreal Expos
Roster
Pitchers: 48 Tavo Álvarez; 72 Luis Aquino; 49 Reid Cornelius; 46 José DeLeón; 26 Bryan Eversgerd; 13 Jeff Fassero; 49 Willie Fraser; 29 Greg Harris; 27 Butch Henry; 34 Gil Heredia; 52 Dave Leiper; 45 Pedro Martínez; 33 Carlos Pérez; 51 Mel Rojas; 42 Kirk Rueter; 43,63 Curt Schmidt; 54 Tim Scott; 31 Jeff Shaw; 39 J. J. Thobe; 59 Ugueth Urbina; 47 Gabe White	Catchers: 24 Darrin Fletcher; 19 Tim Laker; 28 Joe Siddall; 2 Tim Spehr; Infielders: 11 Shane Andrews; 5 Sean Berry; 12 Wil Cordero; 30 Cliff Floyd; 16 Tom Foley; 15 Chad Fonville; 4 Mark Grudzielanek; 3 Mike Lansing; 40 Henry Rodríguez; 25 David Segui; 9 Dave Silvestri; 14 Jeff Treadway	Outfielders: 18 Moisés Alou; 1 Yamil Benítez; 7 Lou Frazier; 28 Roberto Kelly; 15 Curtis Pride; 7 F. P. Santangelo; 44 Tony Tarasco; 22 Rondell White	Manager: 17 Felipe Alou; Coaches: 21 Tommy Harper (Hitting); 32 Joe Kerrigan (Pitching); 6 Jerry Manuel (Third base); 55 Luis Pujols (First base); 23 Jim Tracy (Bench)

== Player stats ==
= Indicates team leader

=== Batting ===
==== Starters by position ====
Note: Pos = Position; G = Games played; AB = At bats; H = Hits; Avg. = Batting average; HR = Home runs; RBI = Runs batted in

Pos	Player	G	AB	H	Avg.	HR	RBI
C	Darrin Fletcher	110	350	100	.286	11	45
1B	David Segui	97	383	117	.305	10	57
2B	Mike Lansing	127	467	119	.255	10	62
SS	Wil Cordero	131	514	147	.286	10	49
3B	Sean Berry	103	314	100	.318	14	55
LF	Moisés Alou	93	344	94	.273	14	58
CF	Rondell White	130	474	140	.295	13	57
RF	Tony Tarasco	126	438	109	.249	14	40

==== Other batters ====
Note: G = Games played; AB = At bats; H = Hits; Avg. = Batting average; HR = Home runs; RBI = Runs batted in

Player	G	AB	H	Avg.	HR	RBI
Mark Grudzielanek	78	269	66	.245	1	20
Shane Andrews	84	220	47	.214	8	31
Tim Laker	64	141	33	.234	3	20
F.P. Santangelo	35	98	29	.296	1	9
Roberto Kelly	24	95	26	.274	1	9
Dave Silvestri	39	72	19	.264	2	7
Cliff Floyd	29	69	9	.130	1	8
Lou Frazier	35	63	12	.190	0	3
Curtis Pride	48	63	11	.175	0	2
Henry Rodriguez	24	58	12	.207	1	5
Jeff Treadway	41	50	12	.240	0	10
Yamil Benítez	14	39	15	.385	2	7
Tim Spehr	41	35	9	.257	1	3
Tom Foley	11	24	5	.208	0	2
Chad Fonville	14	12	4	.333	0	0
Joe Siddall	7	10	3	.300	0	1

=== Pitching ===
==== Starting pitchers ====
Note: G = Games pitched; IP = Innings pitched; W = Wins; L = Losses; ERA = Earned run average; SO = Strikeouts

Player	G	IP	W	L	ERA	SO
Pedro Martínez	30	194.2	14	10	3.51	174
Jeff Fassero	30	189.0	13	14	4.33	164
Carlos Pérez	28	141.1	10	8	3.69	106
Butch Henry	21	126.2	7	9	2.84	60
Kirk Rueter	9	47.1	5	3	3.23	28
Tavo Álvarez	8	37.1	1	5	6.75	17

==== Other pitchers ====
Note: G = Games pitched; IP = Innings pitched; W = Wins; L = Losses; ERA = Earned run average; SO = Strikeouts

Player	G	IP	W	L	ERA	SO
Gil Heredia	40	119.0	5	6	4.31	74
Ugueth Urbina	7	23.1	2	2	6.17	15

==== Relief pitchers ====
Note: G = Games pitched; W = Wins; L = Losses; SV = Saves; ERA = Earned run average; SO = Strikeouts

Player	G	W	L	SV	ERA	SO
Mel Rojas	59	1	4	30	4.12	61
Tim Scott	62	2	0	2	3.98	57
Jeff Shaw	50	1	6	3	4.62	45
Greg A. Harris	45	2	3	0	2.61	47
Luis Aquino	29	0	2	2	3.86	22
Dave Leiper	26	0	2	2	2.86	12
Bryan Eversgerd	25	0	0	0	5.14	8
Willie Fraser	22	2	1	2	5.61	12
Gabe White	19	1	2	0	7.01	25
Curt Schmidt	11	0	0	0	6.97	7
Reid Cornelius	8	0	0	0	8.00	4
José DeLeón	7	0	1	0	7.56	12
J. J. Thobe	4	0	0	0	9.00	0

== Award winners ==
1995 Major League Baseball All-Star Game

- Carlos Pérez, pitcher, reserve

== Farm system ==
Level	Team	League	Manager
AAA	Ottawa Lynx	International League	Pete Mackanin
AA	Harrisburg Senators	Eastern League	Pat Kelly
A	West Palm Beach Expos	Florida State League	Gomer Hodge and Rick Sofield
A	Albany Polecats	South Atlantic League	Doug Sisson
A-Short Season	Vermont Expos	New York–Penn League	Jim Gabella
Rookie	GCL Expos	Gulf Coast League	Luis Dorante

LEAGUE CHAMPIONS: Ottawa
