= J. R. Phillips =

American baseball player (born 1970)

- First baseman
- Born: April 29, 1970 (age 55); East Covina, California, U.S.
- Batted: Left Threw: Left

MLB debut
- September 3, 1993, for the San Francisco Giants

Last MLB appearance
- October 3, 1999, for the Colorado Rockies

MLB statistics
- Batting average: .188
- Home runs: 23
- Runs batted in: 67

KBO statistics
- Batting average: .261
- Home runs: 15
- Runs batted in: 36
- Stats at Baseball Reference

Teams
- San Francisco Giants (1993–1996); Philadelphia Phillies (1996); Houston Astros (1997–1998); Colorado Rockies (1999); Hyundai Unicorns (2001)

Charles Gene "J. R." Phillips (born April 29, 1970) is an American former professional baseball player who played first base in the Major Leagues from 1993–1999. He was drafted by the California Angels out of high school in the fourth round of the 1988 Major League Baseball draft.

== Early life and amateur career ==
Phillips was given the nickname "J. R." as a toddler by a family friend but the etymology of the nickname was forgotten by the time Phillips was an adult. He played football at Bishop Amat Memorial High School in La Puente, California and was recruited to play quarterback for USC and Oklahoma State. On the baseball field, he pitched and hit. He was selected by the California Angels in the 1988 Major League Baseball draft. The Angels were the only team that were interested in him as a hitter and not a pitcher.

== Major league career ==
Phillips was selected on waivers by the San Francisco Giants in 1992 and made his Major league debut with the team following September call-ups on September 3, 1993. He hit his first major-league home run off René Arocha the following game, helping the Giants to a late-season victory in their 100-win season of 1993.

After consecutive 27 home run seasons with the Giants' Triple-A farm team, the Phoenix Firebirds, Phillips was named the Giants starting first baseman going into the 1995 season, but his lack of production at the big league level forced him into a platoon with Mark Carreon before mid-season. He hit a career-high 9 home runs and 28 RBIs, while hitting .195 over 231 at bats in 92 games. In the beginning of the 1996 season, Phillips was traded to the Philadelphia Phillies.

He bounced between the minors and the majors over the next four seasons, playing for the Phillies, the Houston Astros and, finally, the Colorado Rockies. Even in 1999, Phillips hit 41 home runs and 100 RBIs for the Rockies' Triple-A club, the Colorado Springs Sky Sox, earning him a September call up. He managed to hit two more home runs but ended up playing his final game on October 3, 1999, against the Giants.

Phillips can be classified as a AAAA-type player: one who had great success in the high minor leagues (AAA), but failed to translate that success in the majors.

== Personal life ==
In or around 1993, he had a son also named J.R.
