= Paul Faries =

American baseball player (born 1965)

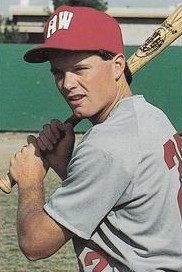
- Faries in 1988
- Second baseman
- Born: February 20, 1965 (age 61); Berkeley, California, U.S.
- Batted: Right Threw: Right

MLB debut
- September 6, 1990, for the San Diego Padres

Last MLB appearance
- September 26, 1993, for the San Francisco Giants

MLB statistics
- Batting average: .201
- Runs batted in: 14
- Hits: 43
- Stats at Baseball Reference

Teams
- San Diego Padres (1990–1992); San Francisco Giants (1993)

Paul Tyrrell Faries (born February 20, 1965) is an American former professional baseball second baseman, who played during four seasons in Major League Baseball (MLB) with the San Diego Padres and San Francisco Giants.

Faries played his first professional season with their Class A Short Season Spokane Indians in 1987, and his last season with the Detroit Tigers' Triple-A club, the Toledo Mud Hens, in 1998.

== Early life and amateur career ==
Faries attended Campolindo High School in Moraga, California then Pepperdine University from 1984 to 1987.

Faries became one of the earliest Waves to earn All-American status, as the American Baseball Coaches Association put him on its third team in 1987. He shared West Coast Conference (WCC) Player of the Year honors with teammate Steve Erickson (who had also been his teammate at Campolindo High) during his senior season as well. He was named to the All-WCC first team as a sophomore and a senior, and to the second team as a junior.

== Professional career ==
Faries was drafted by the Padres in the 23rd round of the 1987 MLB draft. He was the named the California League Most Valuable Player in 1988.

Faries was a September call-up to the Padres in 1990. He had a game-winning suicide squeeze in July 1991.

Faries was a Triple-A All-Star in 1992. Following that season, San Diego traded him to San Francisco for Jim Pena.

== Personal life ==
Faries is married and has a child. Following his playing career, Faries worked in investment banking in the Sacramento area.
