= J. J. Thobe =

American baseball player (born 1970)

- Pitcher
- Born: November 19, 1970 (age 55); Covington, Kentucky, U.S.
- Batted: Right Threw: Right

MLB debut
- September 18, 1995, for the Montreal Expos

Last MLB appearance
- September 29, 1995, for the Montreal Expos

MLB statistics
- Win–loss record: 0–0
- Earned run average: 9.00
- Strikeouts: 0
- Stats at Baseball Reference

Teams
- Montreal Expos (1995)

John Joseph Thobe (born November 19, 1970) is an American former professional baseball pitcher who played for the Montreal Expos of Major League Baseball (MLB) in 1995.
