= Dan Walters =

American baseball player (1966–2020)

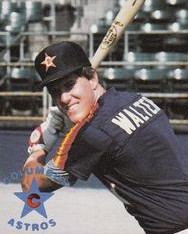
- Walters in 1988
- Catcher
- Born: August 15, 1966; Brunswick, Maine, U.S.
- Died: April 23, 2020 (aged 53); Santee, California, U.S.
- Batted: Right Threw: Right

MLB debut
- June 1, 1992, for the San Diego Padres

Last MLB appearance
- May 23, 1993, for the San Diego Padres

MLB statistics
- Batting average: .234
- Home runs: 5
- Runs batted in: 32
- Stats at Baseball Reference

Teams
- San Diego Padres (1992–1993)

Daniel Gene Walters (August 15, 1966 – April 23, 2020) was an American professional baseball player. He played as a catcher in Major League Baseball (MLB) for the San Diego Padres in the 1992 and 1993 seasons.

== Career ==
Born in Brunswick, Maine, Walters attended Santana High School in Santee, California. In 84 career games, he had 64 hits in 273 at-bats, with a .234 batting average.

After his playing days were over, Walters remained in San Diego and became a police officer with the San Diego Police Department. He became paralyzed from the neck down after he was shot in the neck and hit by a car in 2003. Later he regained some movement in his left hand.

Walters died due to complications from his injuries on April 23, 2020. He was 53.
