= Tavo Álvarez =

Mexican baseball player (born 1971)

Bravos de León
- Pitcher / Coach
- Born: November 25, 1971 (age 54); Ciudad Obregón, Sonora, Mexico
- Batted: Right Threw: Right

MLB debut
- August 21, 1995, for the Montreal Expos

Last MLB appearance
- September 29, 1996, for the Montreal Expos

MLB statistics
- Win–loss record: 3–6
- Earned run average: 5.40
- Strikeouts: 26
- Stats at Baseball Reference

Teams
- Montreal Expos (1995–1996)

César Octavio "Tavo" Álvarez (born November 25, 1971) is a Mexican former professional baseball pitcher who currently serves as the pitching coach for the Bravos de León of the Mexican League. He played in Major League Baseball (MLB) for the Montreal Expos from 1995 to 1996.

== Playing career ==
Álvarez attended high school at Tucson High School in Tucson, Arizona. His senior year, he was one of 25 high school baseball players in USA Today's "Super 25" for the 1990 season. He was also named the Arizona Gatorade Player of the Year for baseball in 1990. After his senior season, he was drafted by the Montreal Expos in the second round of the 1990 Major League Baseball draft, and he signed with the team on June 19.

After signing the contract, he played the rest of the 1990 season with the rookie-level Gulf Coast League Expos, winning five games and losing two. Alvarez played his full first professional season with the Single-A Sumter Flyers in 1991, posting a 12–10 record and a 3.24 earned run average (ERA). He had a career year in 1992, playing for both the West Palm Beach Expos and Harrisburg Senators, combining for 17 wins, five losses, and a 1.74 ERA. He spent the full 1993 season with the Ottawa Lynx, and finished the season with a 7–10 record and a 4.21 ERA.

After spending 1994 in the Mexican League, Alvarez did not re-sign with the Expos until April 1995 due to visa problems. Combined with arm surgery, in July 1995 he made his first minor league start since 1993. A month later on August 21, he made his major league debut against the Los Angeles Dodgers. He started eight games for the Expos during the 1995 Montreal Expos season, winning one game, losing five, striking out 17 and posting an ERA of 6.75. He split the 1996 season between Montreal and Ottawa. He pitched in 20 games for Ottawa, winning four and losing nine. During the 1996 Montreal Expos season, he pitched in 11 games and posted a 2–1 record and a 3.00 ERA. Despite better success, his pitching appearance on September 29, 1996, was the last of his major league career.

Álvarez tried to remain on the major league roster in 1997. During spring training, on one of the scoreboards, he was introduced as "Taco Alvarez." He spent the 1997 season in Ottawa, winning four games and losing eight. His last professional season was with the Pittsburgh Pirates' Triple-A club, the Nashville Sounds, in 1998. He pitched in 15 games for them and had an ERA of 4.83.

== Coaching career ==
On January 17, 2019, Álvarez was hired to serve as the pitching coach for the Leones de Yucatán of the Mexican League. On October 11, 2025, Álvarez was fired by the Leones.

On December 4, 2025, Álvarez was hired to serve as the pitching coach for the Bravos de León of the Mexican League.
