= John Patterson (infielder) =

American baseball player (born 1967)

- Second baseman
- Born: February 11, 1967 (age 59); Key West, Florida, U.S.
- Batted: Switch Threw: Right

MLB debut
- April 6, 1992, for the San Francisco Giants

Last MLB appearance
- September 26, 1995, for the San Francisco Giants

MLB statistics
- Batting average: .215
- Home runs: 5
- Runs batted in: 52
- Stats at Baseball Reference

Teams
- San Francisco Giants (1992–1995)

John Allen Patterson (born February 11, 1967) is an American former Major League Baseball second baseman who played from 1992 to 1995 for the San Francisco Giants.

Prior to professional baseball, he attended Grand Canyon University and Central Arizona College. Patterson was originally drafted by the San Diego Padres in the third round of the 1986 amateur draft; however, he chose not to sign. In 1988, the Giants took him in the 23rd round, and that time, he did choose to sign.

Patterson began his professional career in 1988 with the Everett Giants. In 232 at-bats with them, he hit .250 with no home runs, 21 stolen bases and 26 RBI. After missing the 1989 season, Patterson collected 160 hits in 530 at-bats for a .302 batting average with the San Jose Giants in 1990. In 131 games, he hit four home runs, scored 91 runs, drove 66 runs in and stole 29 bases. In 1991, playing for the Shreveport Captains, Patterson hit .295 in 464 at-bats over 117 games. He also hit four home runs, drove in 56 RBI and stole 41 bases.

Patterson made his big league debut on April 6, 1992, against the Los Angeles Dodgers. He appeared in the game as a pinch runner for Robby Thompson. In 32 games in the majors in 1992, he hit .184 with five stolen bases. He played in 93 games with the Phoenix Firebirds that year as well, hitting .301 with 37 RBI and 22 stolen bases in 362 at-bats.

The following year, he appeared in 16 games for the Giants, collecting three hits in 16 at-bats for a .188 average. In 16 games with the Firebirds that year, he hit .235 in 68 at-bats.

He is best known for an unlikely home run he hit against the Atlanta Braves on September 1, 1993 in the heat of a pennant race between the Giants and Braves. Patterson had missed most of the season with a torn rotator cuff, and had only 68 at-bats in Single A San Jose. He was called up to the Major League club on September 1 when roster sizes expand from 25 to 40 and later that day was asked to pinch hit in the 9th inning, his first Major League at bat of the season, with the game tied at 2. He hit his first Major League home run off Mark Wohlers, who had not allowed a home run in exactly two years . His home run gave the Giants the win and a 4.5 game lead over the Braves in the National League West. The pennant race would go down to the final day of the season with the Braves winning by 1 game.

In 1992, Patterson also has the dubious claim to fame of, while at bat during an exhibition game against the Anaheim Angels, fouling a pitch into the Angels dugout and hitting Matt Keough in the right temple nearly killing him and ending Keough's playing career .

Patterson appeared in 85 games for the Giants in 1994 95 games for them in 1995. He hit .238 and .205 and he stole 13 bases and three bases in those years, respectively. He played in his final big league game on September 26, 1995.

Overall, Patterson hit .215 in 564 big league at-bats. He stole 22 bases, scored 74 runs and drove in 52 runs.

He is now working in Real Estate in Scottsdale, Arizona .
