= Shane Andrews =

American baseball player (born 1971)

- Third baseman
- Born: August 28, 1971 (age 54); Dallas, Texas, U.S.
- Batted: Right Threw: Right

MLB debut
- April 26, 1995, for the Montreal Expos

Last MLB appearance
- September 29, 2002, for the Boston Red Sox

MLB statistics
- Batting average: .220
- Home runs: 86
- Runs batted in: 263
- Stats at Baseball Reference

Teams
- Montreal Expos (1995–1999); Chicago Cubs (1999–2000); Boston Red Sox (2002)

Darrell Shane Andrews (born August 28, 1971) is a former third baseman in Major League Baseball. He graduated from Carlsbad New Mexico High School in 1990. Andrews began his minor-league career in 1990 with the Gulf Coast Expos. In 1992, he led he South Atlantic League with 25 home runs and 107 walks.

From 1995 through 2002, Andrews played for the Montreal Expos (1995–1999), Chicago Cubs (1999–2000) and Boston Red Sox (2002). He batted and threw right-handed. In a seven-season career, Andrews posted a .220 batting average with 86 home runs and 263 RBI in 569 games played.

Andrews currently resides in Carlsbad, New Mexico with his family.
