= Rondell White =

American baseball player (born 1972)

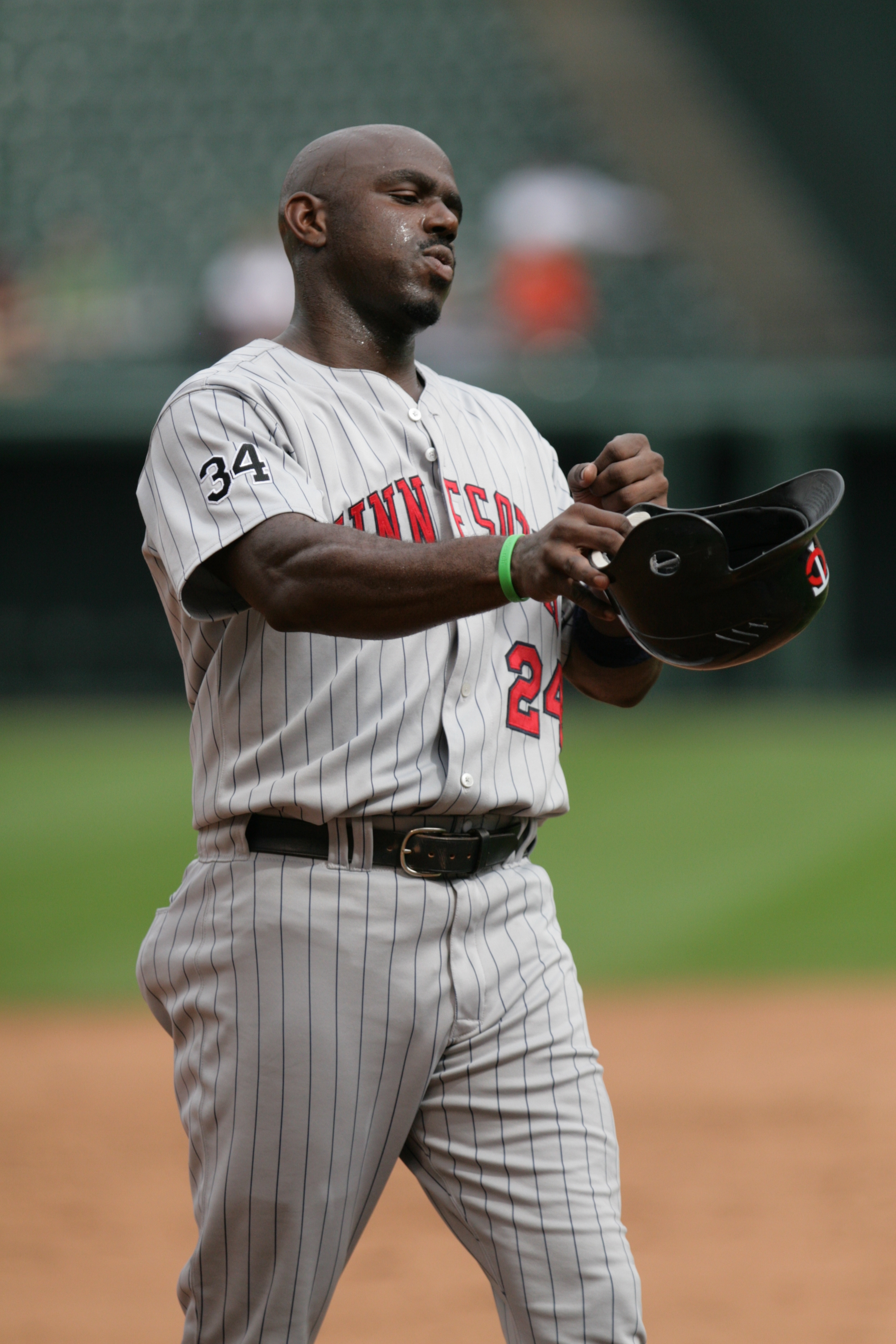
- White with the Minnesota Twins in 2006
- Outfielder
- Born: February 23, 1972 (age 54); Milledgeville, Georgia, U.S.
- Batted: Right Threw: Right

MLB debut
- September 1, 1993, for the Montreal Expos

Last MLB appearance
- September 30, 2007, for the Minnesota Twins

MLB statistics
- Batting average: .284
- Home runs: 198
- Runs batted in: 768
- Stats at Baseball Reference

Teams
- Montreal Expos (1993–2000); Chicago Cubs (2000–2001); New York Yankees (2002); San Diego Padres (2003); Kansas City Royals (2003); Detroit Tigers (2004–2005); Minnesota Twins (2006–2007)

Career highlights and awards
- All-Star (2003)

Rondell Bernard White (born February 23, 1972) is an American former professional baseball player. He played in Major League Baseball as an outfielder and designated hitter. In addition to being a solid defensive player, White also had a batting average of .300 or higher for four consecutive seasons from 1998 to 2001.

== Amateur career ==
White attended Jones County High School in Gray, Georgia, where he played baseball and basketball. He was the Atlanta Journal-Constitution's Player of the Year in 1990 and was also selected to the USA Today and Collegiate Baseball All-America squads that year. He was also named the Gatorade Player of the Year for Georgia in baseball that year.

== Professional career ==
White was drafted by the Montreal Expos as the 24th overall pick in the first round of 1990 Major League Baseball draft as a compensation pick from the California Angels for signing Mark Langston. White played in the Expos' minor league system for four years from 1990 to 1994. In 1993, White posted an impressive .380 batting average in 42 games for the Ottawa Lynx of the International League, earning him a promotion to the Expos. He made his major league debut on September 1, at the age of 21.

On June 11, 1995, White hit for the cycle and had 6 hits in 7 at bats during a game against the San Francisco Giants with the Expos emerging victorious after 13-innings. He became the fourth Expos player in team history to hit for the cycle (preceded by Tim Foli on April 22, 1976, Chris Speier on July 20, 1978, and Tim Raines on August 16, 1987). White had two singles, two doubles, an extra-inning triple, and a home run.

In 1997, White hit a career-high 28 home runs for the Expos. He also led the National League (NL) center fielders with 379 putouts and 3 double plays and finished the season ranked second in the league with 2.7 defensive Wins Above Replacement (WAR). By 1999, White primarily played left field.

On July 31, 2000, the Expos traded White to the Chicago Cubs for Scott Downs. After playing two seasons for the Cubs, he signed a two-year deal with the New York Yankees on December 17, 2001. On March 19, 2003, he was traded from the Yankees to the San Diego Padres for Bubba Trammell and Mark Phillips. That year he was named as a reserve player for the NL in the MLB All-Star Game. On August 26, he was traded to the Kansas City Royals for Chris Tierney and Brian Sanches. White ended the 2003 season with a career-high 87 runs batted in between the two teams. After the season, he became a free agent and signed with the Detroit Tigers. After two seasons with the Tigers, he signed with the Minnesota Twins on December 22, 2005. White played in his final major league game on September 30, 2007, at the age of 35.

On December 13, 2007, White was mentioned in the Mitchell Report in connection to steroids.

== Career statistics ==
In a 15-year major league career, White played in 1,474 games, accumulating 1,519 hits in 5,357 at bats for a .284 career batting average along with 198 home runs, 768 runs batted in and an on-base percentage of .336. He led the league in putouts in 1997, twice led the league in fielding percentage as an outfielder and retired with a .989 fielding percentage as a center fielder and a .985 fielding percentage as a left fielder, and overall with a .987 fielding percentage.

== See also ==
- List of Major League Baseball players to hit for the cycle
- List of Major League Baseball single-game hits leaders
- List of Major League Baseball players named in the Mitchell Report

Achievements
Preceded by Scott Cooper	Hitting for the cycle June 11, 1995	Succeeded by Gregg Jefferies
