= Kevin Rogers (baseball) =

American baseball player (born 1968)

- Pitcher
- Born: August 20, 1968 (age 57); Cleveland, Mississippi, U.S.
- Batted: Left Threw: Left

MLB debut
- September 4, 1992, for the San Francisco Giants

Last MLB appearance
- May 1, 1994, for the San Francisco Giants

MLB statistics
- Win–loss record: 2–4
- Earned run average: 3.17
- Strikeouts: 95
- Stats at Baseball Reference

Teams
- San Francisco Giants (1992–1994)

Charles Kevin Rogers (born August 20, 1968) is an American former professional baseball left-handed pitcher. He played in Major League Baseball (MLB) for the San Francisco Giants from 1992 to 1994.

Prior to being drafted by the Giants in the ninth round of the 1988 amateur draft, Rogers attended Cleveland High School and Mississippi Delta Community College.

He began his professional career as a starter in 1988 with the Pocatello Giants, going 2–8 with a 6.20 ERA in 13 starts, with 71 strikeouts in 69 2/3 innings pitched.

In 1989, Rogers, pitching for the Clinton Giants, made 29 appearances, starting 28 games. He went 13–8 with a 2.55 ERA, while allowing 128 hits in 169 1/3 innings of work and striking out 168 batters.

Rogers went 14–5 with a 3.61 ERA in 1990 while striking out 186 batters in 172 innings, with 68 walks and allowed 143 hits, also throwing 19 wild pitches.

In 22 games for the Shreveport Captains in 1991, Rogers went 4–6 with a 3.36 ERA. He also struck out 108 batters in 118 innings. He was ranked the 89th best prospect by Baseball America in 1991.

Rogers split time between the Shreveport Captains and Phoenix Firebirds in 1992, going a combined 11–8 with a 3.16 ERA. In 170 2/3 innings, he struck out 172 batters while walking 51. On September 4 of that year, he made his big league debut. Facing the St. Louis Cardinals, Rogers pitched six innings, allowing three earned runs on eight hits and two walks. He allowed one home run, which he gave up to the first batter he faced – Gerónimo Peña. Although he had proven himself to be a strikeout pitcher in the minors, he struck out only one batter in his first major league start – that batter being Ray Lankford. Rogers finished 0–2 with a 4.24 ERA in six starts. He struck out 26 batters in 34 innings pitched.

Although Rogers had been a starter throughout his entire career, he found his niche as a reliever in 1993. In 64 relief appearances, he was 2–2 with a 2.68 ERA and 62 strikeouts in 80 2/3 innings of work. In 1993, he was ranked the 50th best prospect by Baseball America.

Rogers made only nine relief appearances in 1994 due to a clot in his pitching shoulder, posting a 3.48 ERA in 10 1/3 innings of work. He appeared in his final big league game on May 1 of that year.

Despite never pitching in the majors again, Rogers pitched in the minors until 1998. In 1995, he appeared in a total of seven games - five of which were starts – while splitting time between San Jose and Phoenix. Combined, he went 0–2 with a 2.51 ERA in 14 1/3 innings of work. He struck out a total of six batters.

Pitching for San Jose in 1997 after missing all of 1996, Rogers went 0–0 with a 2.76 ERA in eight games started. In 29 1/3 innings of work, he struck out 27 batters. He also pitched in the Atlanta Braves organization that year, for the Richmond Braves. He made 10 relief appearances, going 0–2 with a 7.36 ERA. Combined, he went 0–2 with a 4.02 ERA. In 40 1/3 innings of work, he struck out 36 batters.

Rogers pitched his final season in professional baseball in 1998. Used almost entirely as a reliever, he made 40 total appearances for the Bakersfield Blaze, Shreveport Captains and Fresno Grizzlies. He went 2–1 with a 5.03 ERA in 62 2/3 innings of work, striking out 52 batters.

Overall, Rogers went 2–4 with a 3.17 ERA in 79 major league appearances. In 125 innings, he allowed 118 hits, struck out 95 batters and walked 47 batters. In eight minor league seasons, Rogers went 46–40 with a 3.59 ERA in 184 games (131 starts). In 817 innings, he allowed 744 hits, walking 321 batters and striking out 799.
