= Curt Schmidt =

American baseball player (born 1970)

- Pitcher
- Born: March 16, 1970 (age 55); Miles City, Montana, U.S.
- Batted: Right Threw: Right

MLB debut
- April 28, 1995, for the Montreal Expos

Last MLB appearance
- September 29, 1995, for the Montreal Expos

MLB statistics
- Win–loss record: 0-0
- Earned run average: 6.97
- Strikeouts: 7
- Stats at Baseball Reference

Teams
- Montreal Expos (1995)

Curtis Allen Schmidt (born March 16, 1970) played one year of Major League Baseball in 1995 for the Montreal Expos. During his 11 games, he pitched 10.1 innings, allowing 15 hits and eight runs.
