= Brian Looney =

American baseball player (born 1969)

Post Eagles
- Pitcher
- Born: September 26, 1969 (age 56); New Haven, Connecticut, U.S.
- Batted: Left Threw: Left

MLB debut
- September 26, 1993, for the Montreal Expos

Last MLB appearance
- June 8, 1995, for the Boston Red Sox

MLB statistics
- Win–loss record: 0–1
- Earned run average: 11.37
- Strikeouts: 11
- Stats at Baseball Reference

Teams
- Montreal Expos (1993–1994); Boston Red Sox (1995)

Brian James Looney (born September 26, 1969) is an American former Major League Baseball pitcher. He played during three seasons at the major league level for the Montreal Expos and Boston Red Sox. He was drafted by the Expos in the 10th round of the 1991 amateur draft.

Looney played his first professional season with their Class A (Short Season) Jamestown Expos in 1991, and his last with the Nashua Pride of the independent Atlantic League in 2005. He played his last affiliated season with the Colorado Rockies' Triple-A Colorado Springs Sky Sox in 2003. In the last part of his career, he has played in Italian Serie A1 for T&A San Marino.

Looney is currently a pitching instructor and coach in Connecticut.
