= Pat Gomez =

American baseball player (born 1968)

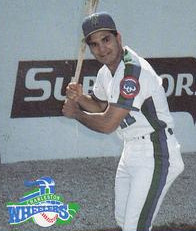
- Gomez in 1988
- Pitcher
- Born: March 17, 1968 (age 58); Roseville, California, U.S.
- Batted: Left Threw: Left

MLB debut
- April 6, 1993, for the San Diego Padres

Last MLB appearance
- September 30, 1995, for the San Francisco Giants

MLB statistics
- Win–loss record: 1–3
- Earned run average: 4.56
- Strikeouts: 55
- Stats at Baseball Reference

Teams
- San Diego Padres (1993); San Francisco Giants (1994–1995)

Patrick Alexander "Pat" Gomez (born March 17, 1968) is an American former Major League Baseball pitcher. Gomez played for the San Diego Padres in 1993 and the San Francisco Giants from 1994 to 1995. He batted and threw left-handed. Gomez attended San Juan High School and was drafted by the Chicago Cubs in the fourth round of the 1986 Major League Baseball draft.
