= Derrick White (baseball) =

American baseball player (born 1969)

- First baseman
- Born: October 12, 1969 (age 56); San Rafael, California, U.S.
- Batted: Right Threw: Right

Professional debut
- MLB: July 22, 1993, for the Montreal Expos
- KBO: 2000, for the Lotte Giants
- NPB: March 31, 2002, for the Hanshin Tigers

Last appearance
- MLB: August 18, 1998, for the Colorado Rockies
- KBO: 2000, for the Lotte Giants
- NPB: August 10, 2002, for the Hanshin Tigers

MLB statistics
- Batting average: .181
- Home runs: 3
- Runs batted in: 8

KBO statistics
- Batting average: .303
- Home runs: 11
- Runs batted in: 53

NPB statistics
- Batting average: .227
- Home runs: 7
- Runs batted in: 21
- Stats at Baseball Reference

Teams
- Montreal Expos (1993); Detroit Tigers (1995); Chicago Cubs (1998); Colorado Rockies (1998); Lotte Giants (2000); Hanshin Tigers (2002)
Medals
Men's baseball
Representing United States
World Junior Baseball Championship
Silver medal – second place	1984 Saskatoon	Team

Derrick Ramon White (born October 12, 1969) is an American former professional baseball first baseman. He played for three seasons in Major League Baseball (MLB) for the Montreal Expos (1993), the Detroit Tigers (1995), and the Chicago Cubs and Colorado Rockies (1998). He also played one season in the KBO League for the Lotte Giants (2000), and one season in Nippon Professional Baseball (NPB) for the Hanshin Tigers (2002).
