= Guillermo Velasquez (baseball) =

Mexican baseball player (born 1968)

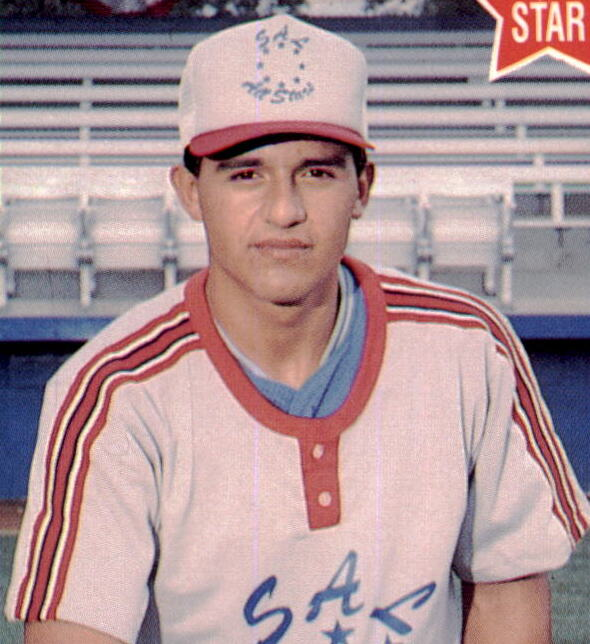
- Velasquez c. 1988
- First baseman / Outfielder
- Born: April 23, 1968 (age 57); Mexicali, Baja California, Mexico
- Batted: Left Threw: Right

MLB debut
- September 14, 1992, for the San Diego Padres

Last MLB appearance
- October 3, 1993, for the San Diego Padres

MLB statistics
- Batting average: .223
- Home runs: 4
- Runs batted in: 25
- Stats at Baseball Reference

Teams
- San Diego Padres (1992–1993)

Guillermo Burgara Velasquez (born April 23, 1968) is a Mexican former Major League Baseball first baseman and outfielder who played parts of two seasons for the San Diego Padres from 1992–1993. He batted left-handed and threw right-handed.

== Playing career ==
Velasquez was signed by the Padres after the 1986 season from the Sultanes de Monterrey of the Mexican League. He spent the next 6 seasons in the Padres minor league system, playing on teams including the Single-A Riverside Red Wave, Double-A Wichita Wranglers, and Triple-A Las Vegas Stars. He spent most of the 1992 season in Las Vegas before being called up to the major league club that September.

He began the 1993 season in San Diego before being sent back to Triple-A Las Vegas in June. After playing 30 games with the Stars, he was called back up to the big leagues after the Padres traded Fred McGriff to the Atlanta Braves. His final major league game was on October 3, 1993 against the Chicago Cubs. Velasquez spent the 1994 and 1995 seasons in the Boston Red Sox, Cleveland Indians, and Montreal Expos minor-league systems before leaving American professional baseball at age 27.

In 2005, at age 37, Velasquez made a comeback in the Mexican League, appearing in over 250 games for three different teams before retiring in 2007 at age 39.
