= Jim McNamara =

American baseball player (born 1965)

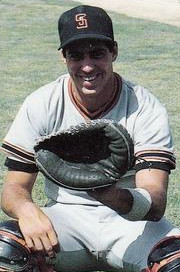
- McNamara in 1988
- Catcher
- Born: June 10, 1965 (age 59); Nashua, New Hampshire, U.S.
- Batted: Left Threw: Right

MLB debut
- April 9, 1992, for the San Francisco Giants

Last MLB appearance
- July 28, 1993, for the San Francisco Giants

MLB statistics
- Batting average: .210
- Home runs: 1
- Runs batted in: 10
- Stats at Baseball Reference

Teams
- San Francisco Giants (1992–1993)

James Patrick McNamara (born June 10, 1965) is a former professional baseball player. He played parts of two seasons in Major League Baseball as a catcher for the San Francisco Giants in 1992-93.

== Career ==
Prior to being drafted by the Giants in the fifth round of the 1986 amateur draft, McNamara attended both James Madison High School and North Carolina State University, where he played college baseball for the Wolfpack. He began his professional career with the Everett Giants in 1986. With them, he hit .247 with eight home runs and 30 RBI in 47 games. The following year, he played for the Clinton Giants, McNamara hit .247 with five home runs and 53 RBI in 385 at bats. He slumped in 1988 while playing for the San Jose Giants, hitting only .187 with one home run and 41 RBI in 315 at-bats. He split time between the Giants and Salinas Spurs and Phoenix Firebirds in 1989, hitting a combined .232 in 95 games.

For the 1990 season, McNamara played for San Jose, Phoenix and the Shreveport Captains. Combined, he played in 87 games, collecting 60 hits in 257 at-bats for a .233 batting average. In 1991, McNamara played for Shreveport and Phoenix, hitting a combined .241 in 58 games.

Although he never managed to hit above .250 in a minor league season, he still managed to make it to the major leagues. He made his big league debut on April 9, 1992. He had only one at-bat in that game, grounding out against Ben Rivera. He hit .216 with one home run and nine RBI in his first big league season. In 74 at-bats, he struck out 25 times while walking only six times. He also spent some time with Phoenix in 1992, hitting .209 in 67 at-bats.

He was granted free agency in October 1992 and signed by the Florida Marlins. However, the Giants drafted him in the Rule 5 draft in December of that year.

McNamara spent most of his 1993 season with Phoenix, where he hit .196 in 158 at-bats. He appeared in four major league games that year, collecting one hit in seven at-bats for a .143 batting average. He played his final big league game against the Los Angeles Dodgers on July 28, 1993. He was granted free agency by the Giants in October 1993. He was signed as a free agent by the Texas Rangers in November of that year.

For the Oklahoma City 89ers in 1994, McNamara hit .239 in 138 at-bats. He wound up in the New York Yankees organization, playing in 27 games for the Columbus Clippers, hitting .130. 1994 was his final professional season.

Overall, McNamara hit .210 with one home run and 10 RBI in 81 major league at-bats. In 1998 minor league at bats, he hit .223.

== Family ==
Jim has a son James and a daughter Elisabeth. He is married to Christina Wofford McNamara. Jim is the youngest out of 9
