= Pete Young =

American baseball player (born 1968)

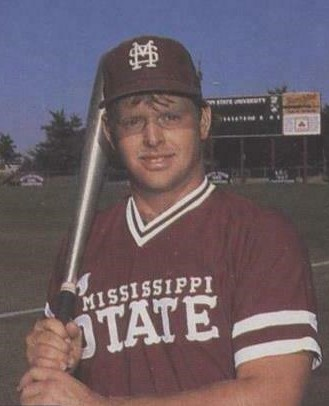
- Pitcher
- Born: March 19, 1968 (age 57); Meadville, Mississippi, U.S.
- Batted: Right Threw: Right

MLB debut
- June 5, 1992, for the Montreal Expos

Last MLB appearance
- July 18, 1993, for the Montreal Expos

MLB statistics
- Win–loss record: 1–0
- Earned run average: 3.63
- Strikeouts: 14
- Stats at Baseball Reference

Teams
- Montreal Expos (1992–1993)
Medals
Men's baseball
Representing United States
World Junior Baseball Championship
Bronze medal – third place	1986 Windsor	Team

Bryan Owen "Pete" Young (born March 19, 1968) is an American former professional baseball pitcher. A right-hander, he played parts of two seasons in Major League Baseball (MLB) for the Montreal Expos in 1992 and 1993. He appeared in 17 games, all as a relief pitcher.

== Career ==
Young attended Mississippi State University, where he participated in college baseball. In 1987, he played collegiate summer baseball in the Cape Cod Baseball League for the Yarmouth-Dennis Red Sox.

On June 2, 1986, Young was drafted by the Cincinnati Reds in the 22nd round of the amateur draft, but did not sign to play Minor League Baseball with Cincinnati, opting instead to enroll at Mississippi State where he developed as a pitcher. Young was drafted again on June 5, 1989, by the Montreal Expos in the 6th round (148th overall pick) of the amateur draft. This time, Young signed to play in the minors in the Expos organization.

Young made his major league debut on June 5, 1992, with the Expos at age 24. On that day, Young pitched 1.2 innings against the Reds, striking out one batter. The Expos lost the game 10–4. Young played his final major league game for the Expos on July 18, 1993; on February 18, 1994, he was purchased along with Matt Stairs by the Boston Red Sox organization, but his career ended that season after not reaching the major league club.

At the time of his retirement, Young had earned a career earned run average of 3.63. He finished with 25.2 innings pitched, striking out 14 batters, and playing in a total of 17 games. He allowed 22 hits, 1 home run, and 9 walks. He only got one win in his career, on July 10, 1993, against the San Diego Padres. Young came to bat only once in his two-season career.
