= Erik Johnson (infielder) =

American baseball player (born 1965)

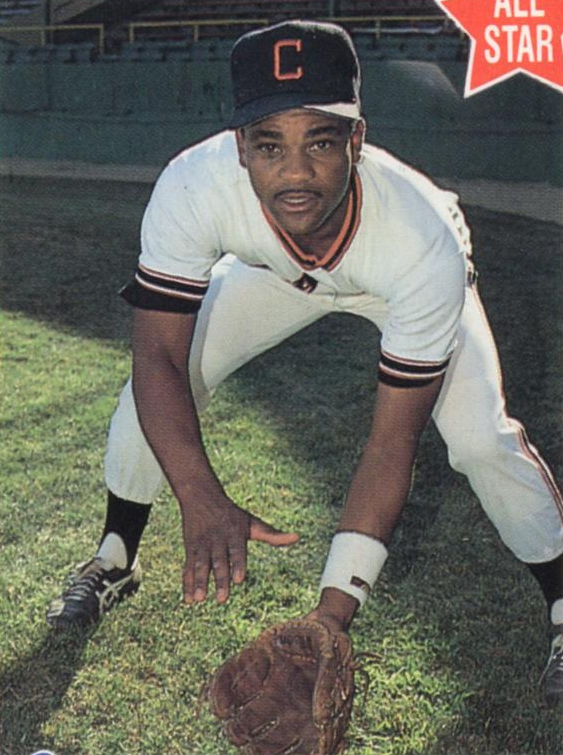
- Johnson with the Clinton Giants c. 1988
- Infielder
- Born: October 11, 1965 (age 60); Oakland, California, U.S.
- Batted: Right Threw: Right

MLB debut
- July 8, 1993, for the San Francisco Giants

Last MLB appearance
- May 28, 1994, for the San Francisco Giants

MLB statistics
- Games played: 9
- At bats: 18
- Batting average: .222
- Hits: 4
- Stats at Baseball Reference

Teams
- San Francisco Giants (1993–1994)

Erik Anthony Johnson (born October 11, 1965) is an American former professional baseball infielder who played for the San Francisco Giants of the Major League Baseball (MLB) in 1993 and 1994.

Johnson played in the 1978 Little League World Series; his team won the U.S. championship and lost in the finals to Taiwan.
