= Mike Benjamin (baseball) =

American baseball player (born 1965)

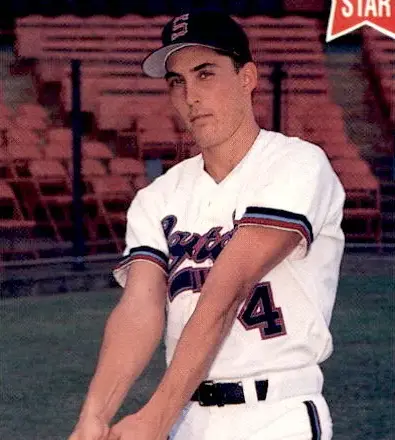
- Benjamin with the Shreveport Captains c. 1988
- Infielder
- Born: November 22, 1965 (age 60); Euclid, Ohio, U.S.
- Batted: Right Threw: Right

MLB debut
- July 7, 1989, for the San Francisco Giants

Last MLB appearance
- September 28, 2002, for the Pittsburgh Pirates

MLB statistics
- Batting average: .229
- Home runs: 24
- Runs batted in: 169
- Stats at Baseball Reference

Teams
- San Francisco Giants (1989–1995); Philadelphia Phillies (1996); Boston Red Sox (1997–1998); Pittsburgh Pirates (1999–2000, 2002)

Michael Paul Benjamin (born November 22, 1965) is an American former professional baseball infielder who played in Major League Baseball (MLB) from 1989 to 2000 and 2002. Before entering professional baseball, Benjamin played at Cerritos College and Arizona State University, where he was an All-American in his senior season. A utility infielder in the major leagues, he played shortstop in 375 of his 818 career games. His longest stint was with the San Francisco Giants from 1989 to 1995.

== Early life ==
A 1983 graduate of Bellflower High School in California, he played college baseball at Cerritos College and was drafted by the Minnesota Twins in 1985 but continued his college baseball career at Arizona State University instead of pursuing professional baseball. In 1987, his senior season at Arizona State, he had a .309 batting average, 14 home runs (HR), and 45 runs batted in (RBI). That year he was one of four Arizona State players (including catcher Tim Spehr) named to the All-Pac-10 Conference Southern Division team by the Arizona Daily Star and to the Division I All-America Team by Baseball America.

== Playing career ==
Benjamin was a third-round draft pick of the San Francisco Giants in June 1987, and by April 1989 he was playing for the Giants' Triple-A affiliate, the Phoenix Firebirds. He was said to be playing sensationally at shortstop but experiencing lower back pain.

Benjamin made his major league debut with the Giants on July 7, 1989, and he played with the team through 1995, never appearing in more than 68 games in a season. On June 14, 1995, he tied a Giants single-game record with six hits. This was part of a stretch in which he tied the major league record for most hits in two consecutive games with ten, set a major league record for most hits in three consecutive games with 14, and tied another record for most hits in four consecutive games with 15.

In October 1995, Benjamin was traded to the Philadelphia Phillies in exchange for pitcher Jeff Juden and a minor league player. After one season there, he was granted free agency. He signed one-year contracts with the Boston Red Sox in 1997 and 1998. With the 1998 Red Sox, Benjamin appeared in a career-high 124 games and hit for a career-high .272 batting average. He ended his career with the Pittsburgh Pirates, playing there from 1999 to 2002 and missing the 2001 season due to injury.

== Later life ==
In 2003, Benjamin coached his son's Little League team from Arizona to the Little League World Series in Williamsport, Pennsylvania. From 2016 to 2017, he served as the manager for the Kane County Cougars. He was the manager for the Missoula Osprey of the Pioneer League in 2017–2018, and he became the team's bench coach in 2019.

== See also ==
- List of Major League Baseball single-game hits leaders
