= Archi Cianfrocco =

American baseball player (born 1966)

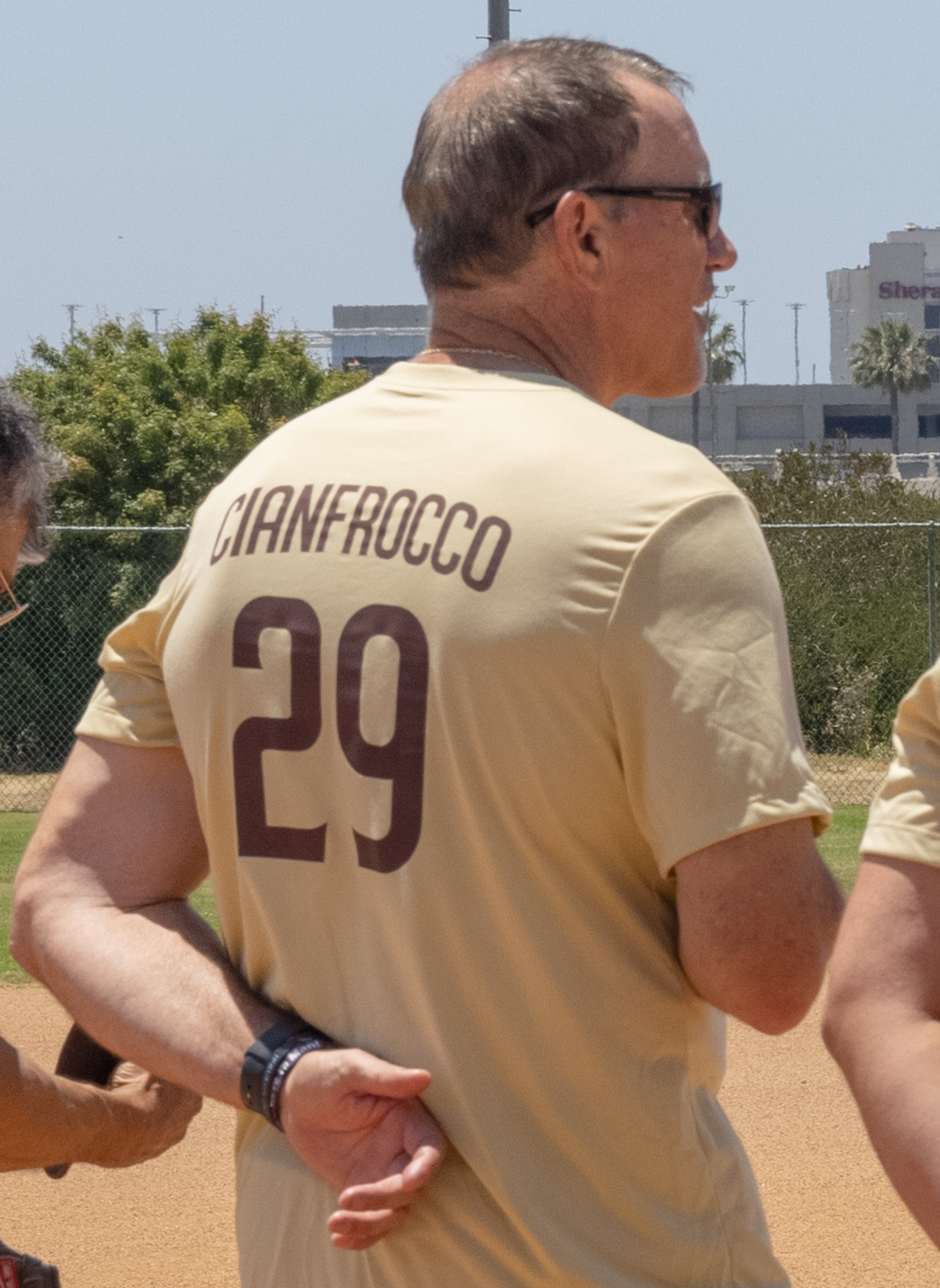
- Cianfrocco in 2024
- First baseman / Third baseman
- Born: October 6, 1966 (age 60); Rome, New York, U.S.
- Batted: Right Threw: Right

Professional debut
- MLB: April 8, 1992, for the Montreal Expos
- NPB: April 3, 1999, for the Seibu Lions

Last appearance
- MLB: September 26, 1998, for the San Diego Padres
- NPB: April 25, 1999, for the Seibu Lions

MLB statistics
- Batting average: .241
- Home runs: 34
- Runs batted in: 185

NPB statistics
- Batting average: .263
- Home runs: 2
- Runs batted in: 5
- Stats at Baseball Reference

Teams
- Montreal Expos (1992–1993); San Diego Padres (1993–1998); Seibu Lions (1999)

Angelo Dominic "Archi" Cianfrocco (born October 6, 1966) is an American former professional baseball player. He played all or parts of seven seasons in Major League Baseball (MLB), mostly at first and third base, from 1992 to 1998.

== Career ==
Cianfrocco was drafted twice, first by the Pittsburgh Pirates in the 11th round (259th overall) of the 1986 amateur entry draft, then by the Montreal Expos in the 5th round (122nd overall) of the 1987 amateur entry draft. He elected not to sign with Pittsburgh, but after one season of college baseball at Purdue, he signed with Montreal in 1987. The Expos traded him to the San Diego Padres in 1993 for pitcher Tim Scott. After his MLB career, Cianfrocco played a season in Nippon Professional Baseball (NPB) for the Seibu Lions.

While playing for the Padres, he had multiple fan clubs, including "Archi's Army" and the "CianfrocCrew". On Hall of Fame Weekend on August 4, 1997, he won the Home Run Derby in Cooperstown.

Cianfrocco was the Padres' batter facing Tom Browning when the Cincinnati Reds pitcher broke his arm while delivering a pitch.

He currently resides in San Diego, California, and is the OEM Sales Manager at Seagate Systems.
