= Carlos Alfonso (baseball) =

Cuban baseball player and manager

Carlos A. Alfonso (born December 18, 1950) is a former minor league baseball player and manager, as well as a former minor and major league coach. He is currently the Tampa Bay Rays Director of International Operations. He helped open the Rays Academies in Colombia, Brazil, Venezuela, and the Dominican Republic. In January 2014, he became the Houston Astros Coordinator of International Development and Special Assignment Scout.

== Education ==
Alfonso graduated from Naples Senior High School (Naples, FL) in 1968. He won the Scholar Athlete of the Year and also was inducted in the National Honor Society. Alfonso attended Miami Dade JC, Edison JC, Brevard JC as well as University of South Florida and Florida International University. He majored In Psychology and minored in Spanish.

== Playing career ==
Alfonso played in the Houston Astros organization from 1968 to 1975 and in the Cincinnati Reds organization in 1976. He was originally a third baseman and catcher in his first two professional seasons; however, in 1969, he also pitched (although in 1970 he spent a few games at second base). He spent from 1972 to 1976 at the AAA level. Overall, he went 39–35 with a 3.71 ERA in 234 appearances as a pitcher (101 starts).

== Managerial career ==
From 1979 to 1981, Alfonso managed the Daytona Beach Astros. He led them to the playoffs in 1980, however they lost in the first round. They were league champions in 1981, even though they finished with a regular season record barely above .500 - 68–67.

In 1985, he managed the Columbus Astros and led them to the Southern League Playoffs, in 1986 the Tucson Toros and in 1993 and 1994 the Phoenix Firebirds in the Pacific Coast League. He also managed in the Winter Leagues in Mexico, Hawaii, Venezuela and the Dominican Republic.

== Minor league coaching career ==
Save for the years he managed, he was a Pitching Coordinator in the lower minors in the Astros' system from 1982 through 1984. During that time period he was also the Houston Astros Minor League Spring Training Coordinator.

== Major league coaching career ==
Alfonso was a Major League Bullpen Catcher and Coach for the Houston Astros in 1977. Alfonso was a San Francisco Giants Major League Pitching coach in 1992, and from 1996 to 1999 he was on their staff as a first base and Bullpen coach and Major League Spring Training Coordinator. From 2000 to 2005, he served as their administrative coach, which included coordinating Major League Spring Training and administering the defense and pitching charts as well as video and advance scouting reports.

== Executive career ==
In 1978 he was the Houston Astros Traveling Secretary. From September 1986 through December 1991 he held posts of Director of Minor League Operations and Director of Player Development for the San Francisco Giants. In 1995, he was the Giants' coordinator of Latin America Instruction.

In 2006, Alfonso was named the Tampa Bay Devil Rays director of international operations. In October 2013 Alfonso became Special Assistant to the International Department of the Tampa Bay Rays. In February 2014, Alfonso became Coordinator of International Development and Special Assignment Scout of the Houston Astros.
