= Oreste Marrero =

Puerto Rican baseball player (born 1969)

- First baseman
- Born: October 31, 1969 (age 56); Bayamón, Puerto Rico
- Batted: Left Threw: Left

MLB debut
- August 12, 1993, for the Montreal Expos

Last MLB appearance
- September 26, 1996, for the Los Angeles Dodgers

MLB statistics
- Batting average: .225
- Home runs: 1
- Runs batted in: 5

CPBL statistics
- Batting average: .287
- Home runs: 8
- Runs batted in: 25
- Stats at Baseball Reference

Teams
- Montreal Expos (1993); Los Angeles Dodgers (1996); Sinon Bulls (1999)

Oreste Vilato Marrero Vázquez (born October 31, 1969) is a Puerto Rican former professional baseball first baseman. He played parts of two seasons in Major League Baseball (MLB) for the Los Angeles Dodgers and Montreal Expos, appearing in 42 games between 1993 and 1996. After his time in the majors, Marrero continued his career in various minor and international leagues, including the Chinese Professional Baseball League (CPBL) and the Atlantic League.

== Career ==
Marrero began his professional career in the Milwaukee Brewers organization in 1987, playing for several of the team's minor league affiliates including the Helena Brewers, Boise Hawks, and Beloit Brewers.

He made his Major League Baseball debut with the Montreal Expos on August 12, 1993, appearing in 17 games that season. Marrero later joined the Los Angeles Dodgers, where he played 25 games during the 1996 season, recording a total of 18 hits, one home run, and five runs batted in across his MLB career.

Following his stint in the majors, Marrero spent time with several Triple-A clubs, including the Ottawa Lynx and Albuquerque Dukes. He also played internationally for the Sinon Bulls of Taiwan's Chinese Professional Baseball League in 1999, posting a .287 batting average with eight home runs and 25 RBIs.

From 2000 to 2005, Marrero played in the independent Atlantic League of Professional Baseball, most notably with the Bridgeport Bluefish, where he continued to contribute as a veteran first baseman before retiring from professional baseball.

== Personal life ==
Marrero's twin brother, Vilato Marrero, also played professional baseball in the minor leagues within the Milwaukee Brewers organization.
