= Craig Colbert =

American baseball player and coach (born 1965)

- Catcher
- Born: February 13, 1965 (age 61); Iowa City, Iowa, U.S.
- Batted: Right Threw: Right

MLB debut
- April 6, 1992, for the San Francisco Giants

Last MLB appearance
- September 29, 1993, for the San Francisco Giants

MLB statistics
- Batting average: .215
- Home runs: 2
- Runs batted in: 21
- Stats at Baseball Reference

Teams
- As player: San Francisco Giants (1992–1993); As coach: San Diego Padres (2007–2008)

Craig Charles Colbert (born February 13, 1965) is a former Major League Baseball catcher and former bench coach for the San Diego Padres.

A 1983 graduate out of Manhattan High School, Colbert was selected in the 20th round of the 1986 Major League Baseball draft by the San Francisco Giants. He played in their farm system until making his debut at the beginning of the 1992 season, and played in 72 games over two seasons, being released after the 1993 season.

Colbert played several more seasons in the minor leagues, first for the Cleveland Indians, then for the San Diego Padres. In 1998, Colbert became a player-coach for the Las Vegas Stars, ending his playing career after that season. From 2000 through 2006, Colbert worked his way up the Padres' chain, managing at four different levels of the minor leagues.

In 2007, he was named the Padres' bench coach, a position from which he was let go on September 29, 2008 following a 99 loss season. It seems that he and hitting coach Wally Joyner were the scapegoats for the disappointing season. Though upper management's inability to put proven talent on the field, the team's bottom ranking in MLB at scoring runs, next to last ranking in team batting average, injuries to Jake Peavy and Chris Young, and their paltry 36 stolen bases for the whole season (a total that 11 players in the AL and NL surpassed on their own) heavily contributed to their lackluster season. He is currently a scout for the Philadelphia Phillies.

== Sources ==
- Baseball Reference
- Baseball Reference (Minors)
- Retrosheet
