= Jim Pena =

American baseball player (born 1964)

- Pitcher
- Born: September 17, 1964 (age 60); Los Angeles, California, U.S.
- Batted: Left Threw: Left

MLB debut
- July 7, 1992, for the San Francisco Giants

Last MLB appearance
- October 3, 1992, for the San Francisco Giants

MLB statistics
- Win–loss record: 1–1
- Earned run average: 3.48
- Strikeouts: 32
- Stats at Baseball Reference

Teams
- San Francisco Giants (1992)

James Patrick Pena (born September 17, 1964) is a former left-handed pitcher in Major League Baseball who played for the San Francisco Giants in 1992.
