= Steve Hosey =

American baseball player

- Right fielder
- Born: April 2, 1969 (age 57); Inglewood, California, U.S.
- Batted: Right Threw: Right

MLB debut
- August 29, 1992, for the San Francisco Giants

Last MLB appearance
- September 15, 1993, for the San Francisco Giants

MLB statistics
- Batting average: .259
- Home runs: 1
- Runs batted in: 7
- Stats at Baseball Reference

Teams
- San Francisco Giants (1992–1993)

Steven Bernard Hosey (born April 2, 1969) is an American former right fielder in Major League Baseball.

Originally from Inglewood, California, Hosey has lived in Fresno, California where he has built a real estate business. Hosey is also the Director of Parent Engagement and Training for Family Leadership, Inc.

== Biography ==
Hosey attended Fremont High School in Oakland and stayed in California attending college at Fresno State University. At 6 ft 3 in (1.91 m) and 218 pounds (99 kg), Hosey was originally drafted by the Cleveland Indians in the 19th round of the 1986 draft. He chose not to sign with the Indians and was drafted again in the first round of the 1989 draft by the San Francisco Giants, with whom he chose to sign. He went on to play in 24 games for the Giants from 1992–93.

Hosey is the half-brother of former NBA player Paul Pierce.

== Political candidate ==
Hosey ran to fill the vacancy on the Fresno County Board of Supervisors, District 2 that occurred when former Supervisor Andreas Borgeas was elected to the California State Senate.
