= Kerry Taylor (baseball) =

American baseball player (born 1971)

- Pitcher
- Born: January 25, 1971 (age 55); Bemidji, Minnesota, U.S.
- Batted: Right Threw: Right

MLB debut
- April 13, 1993, for the San Diego Padres

Last MLB appearance
- June 26, 1994, for the San Diego Padres

MLB statistics
- Win–loss record: 0–5
- Earned run average: 6.56
- Strikeouts: 48
- Stats at Baseball Reference

Teams
- San Diego Padres (1993–1994)

Kerry Thomas Taylor (born January 25, 1971) is an American former Major League Baseball pitcher. Taylor grew up in Roseau, Minnesota. Taylor played for the San Diego Padres from 1993 to 1994. He batted and threw right-handed.
