= Lou Frazier =

American baseball player (born 1965)

- Left fielder
- Born: January 26, 1965 (age 61); St. Louis, Missouri, U.S.
- Batted: Switch Threw: Right

MLB debut
- April 8, 1993, for the Montreal Expos

Last MLB appearance
- April 19, 1998, for the Chicago White Sox

MLB statistics
- Batting average: .252
- Home runs: 1
- Runs batted in: 46
- Stats at Baseball Reference

Teams
- Montreal Expos (1993–1995); Texas Rangers (1995–1996); Chicago White Sox (1998)

Arthur Louis Frazier (born January 26, 1965) is an American former Major League Baseball outfielder. He played all or part of five seasons in the majors, between 1993 and 1998, for the Montreal Expos, Texas Rangers, and Chicago White Sox. He was primarily a left fielder.

From 2007 to 2008 Frazier was the first base coach for the Pittsburgh Pirates. His duties included working with the Pirates' outfielders and teaching base-running skills. He was fired by the team on September 28, 2008.
