= Bryan Hickerson =

American baseball player (born 1963)

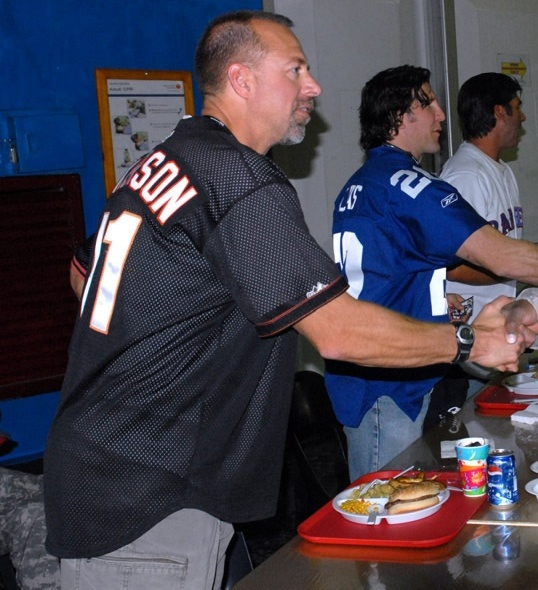
- Hickerson in Iraq in 2008
- Pitcher
- Born: October 13, 1963 (age 62); Bemidji, Minnesota, U.S.
- Batted: Left Threw: Left

MLB debut
- July 25, 1991, for the San Francisco Giants

Last MLB appearance
- September 23, 1995, for the Colorado Rockies

MLB statistics
- Win–loss record: 21–21
- Earned run average: 4.72
- Strikeouts: 279
- Stats at Baseball Reference

Teams
- San Francisco Giants (1991–1994); Chicago Cubs (1995); Colorado Rockies (1995)

Bryan David Hickerson (born October 13, 1963) is an American former Major League Baseball pitcher who played for the San Francisco Giants, Chicago Cubs, and Colorado Rockies from 1991 to 1995.

== Biography ==
A native of Bemidji, Minnesota, Hickerson graduated from Bemidji High School and the University of Minnesota. In 1985, he played collegiate summer baseball with the Cotuit Kettleers of the Cape Cod Baseball League.

Hickerson was selected by the Minnesota Twins in the 7th round of the 1986 MLB draft, and was traded to the San Francisco Giants in 1987. He made his major league debut with San Francisco in 1991, and appeared in 202 games over a five year major league career.

Hickerson is currently on staff with U.P.I., a baseball ministry in Winona Lake, Indiana, where he lives with his wife Jo and children, and is director of Intercession Haiti.
