= Kirt Manwaring =

American baseball player (born 1965)

- Catcher
- Born: July 15, 1965 (age 60); Elmira, New York, U.S.
- Batted: Right Threw: Right

MLB debut
- September 15, 1987, for the San Francisco Giants

Last MLB appearance
- October 3, 1999, for the Colorado Rockies

MLB statistics
- Batting average: .246
- Home runs: 21
- Runs batted in: 278
- Stats at Baseball Reference

Teams
- San Francisco Giants (1987–1996); Houston Astros (1996); Colorado Rockies (1997–1999)

Career highlights and awards
- Gold Glove Award (1993); San Francisco Giants Wall of Fame

Kirt Dean Manwaring (born July 15, 1965) is an American former professional baseball player. He played as a catcher in Major League Baseball from 1987 through 1999, most prominently as a member of the San Francisco Giants, with whom he played for the majority of his career. Although he didn't produce large offensive statistics, Manwaring excelled as a defensive player, winning the National League Gold Glove Award in 1993. He also played for the Houston Astros and the Colorado Rockies.

== Baseball career ==
Manwaring was selected by the Boston Red Sox in the 12th round of the 1983 free-agent draft but, did not sign. He was then selected by the San Francisco Giants in the second round of the 1986 draft out of Coastal Carolina University at the age of 21. A little over a year later, he made his major league debut with the Giants. He played in the 1989 World Series between the Giants and the Oakland A’s that was rocked by a 6.9 magnitude earthquake. Manwaring earned a Gold Glove Award in 1993. He finished the season with the National League's second-highest percentage of throwing out base stealers (45 percent). He spent a decade with the Giants, until he was traded in July 1996 to the Houston Astros for Rick Wilkins and cash. He then became a free agent and chose to sign with the Colorado Rockies. He finished his last season in 1999. He is currently a catching instructor for the Giants.

Manwaring was a standout baseball player at Horseheads High School in Horseheads, New York.

== Awards ==
A very good defensive catcher, he recorded a .998 fielding percentage and won a Gold Glove award with the San Francisco Giants in 1993. He won the 1993 Willie Mac Award honoring his spirit and leadership. In 1993, he was tied for 4th in intentional walks, with 13, all while batting 8th in front of the pitcher's spot.
