= Tim Scott (baseball) =

American baseball player (born 1966)

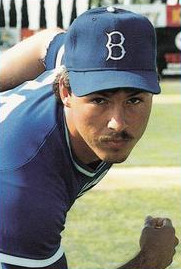
- Scott in 1988
- Pitcher
- Born: November 16, 1966 (age 58); Hanford, California, U.S.
- Batted: Right Threw: Right

MLB debut
- June 25, 1991, for the San Diego Padres

Last MLB appearance
- July 7, 1997, for the Colorado Rockies

MLB statistics
- Win–loss record: 24–13
- Earned run average: 4.13
- Strikeouts: 253
- Stats at Baseball Reference

Teams
- San Diego Padres (1991–1993); Montreal Expos (1993–1996); San Francisco Giants (1996); San Diego Padres (1997); Colorado Rockies (1997)

Timothy Dale Scott (born November 16, 1966) is an American former Major League Baseball right-handed pitcher.

== Career ==
Drafted by the Los Angeles Dodgers in the 2nd round of the 1984 MLB amateur draft, Scott made his Major League Baseball debut with the San Diego Padres on June 25, 1991. His final game in the major leagues came on July 2, 1997. His first professional season was in 1984, playing for Los Angeles' rookie league Great Falls Dodgers. He played his last professional season in 2001, playing for the New York Yankees' Triple-A Columbus Clippers.
