= Phoenix Firebirds =

- 1958–1997; (1958–1959, 1966–1997); Phoenix, Arizona
Team logo
Cap insignia

Minor league affiliations
- Class: AAA (1958–1959, 1966–1997)
- League: Pacific Coast League (1958–1959, 1966–1997)

Major league affiliations
- Team: San Francisco Giants (1958–1959, 1966–1997)

Minor league titles
- League titles: 1959; 1977
- Division titles: 1977; 1985; 1996; 1997

Team data
- Name: Phoenix Firebirds (1986–1997); Phoenix Giants (1958–1959, 1966–1985)
- Colors: Blue, red, yellow, white
- Mascot: Phineas T. Firebird (1989-1997); Booster Rooster (1978-1985)
- Ballpark: Scottsdale Stadium (1992–1997); Phoenix Municipal Stadium (1966–1991)

The Phoenix Firebirds were a Minor League Baseball team that played in Phoenix, Arizona, from 1958 to 1959, and from 1966 to 1997. Before 1986, the team was known as the Phoenix Giants.

The franchise was a member of the Triple-A Pacific Coast League (PCL), and were the top minor league affiliate of the San Francisco Giants. The Firebirds were forced to leave Phoenix following the 1997 season, as the new National League expansion team, the Arizona Diamondbacks would begin play in Phoenix the following year. In a complicated series of events, the owners of the Firebirds moved their team to Tucson, Arizona, and became the Tucson Sidewinders, dropping their affiliation with the Giants in favor of the expansion Diamondbacks. The owners of the existing Tucson Toros then moved their franchise to Fresno, California, thus ending a 92-year hiatus of PCL baseball in Fresno. The transplanted Toros, renamed the Fresno Grizzlies, became the Giants' new PCL affiliate. In 2008, the Firebirds/Sidewinders relocated again, becoming the Reno Aces.

== History ==
The Firebirds were known as the Phoenix Giants until the 1986 season. They were affiliated with the San Francisco Giants for their entire existence, now a rarity in the minor leagues. The Giants still have a spring training facility in the Phoenix area, but in Scottsdale where the Firebirds played from 1992 to 1997.

The Giants first came in 1958 but moved to Tacoma, Washington after the 1959 season. In 1966 the franchise returned to the Phoenix area until their move to Fresno.

The Firebirds played their home games at Phoenix Municipal Stadium until moving to Scottsdale Stadium upon its reopening in 1992. Their final regular season game in August 1997 was played at their original ball park and featured ceremonies including "passing the torch" to the Arizona Diamondbacks, the major league team which became Phoenix's main baseball team who began play the next year. The team made the 1997 PCL playoffs their final year, which extended their existence by a couple weeks. The Firebirds defeated the Colorado Springs Sky Sox 3-0 in the first round but lost the championship series 3 games to 1 to the Edmonton Trappers.

== Championships ==
The Phoenix Giants won two PCL championships in 1959 and 1977. The franchise never won a championship title under the Firebirds name.

The franchise's final game was September 11, 1997, a 7-1 loss handing the Edmonton Trappers the 1997 PCL Championship played at Scottsdale Stadium.

== Playoff history ==
- 1977
  - Championship: Defeated Salt Lake City 3 games to 2
- 1985
  - Division Series: Defeated Hawaii Islanders 3 games to 0
  - Championship: Lost to Vancouver Canadians 3 games to 0
- 1986
  - Division Series: Lost to Las Vegas Stars 3 games to 2
- 1996
  - Division Series: Defeated Las Vegas Stars 3 games to 0
  - Championship: Lost to Edmonton Trappers 3 games to 1
- 1997
  - Division Series: Defeated Colorado Springs Sky Sox 3 games to 0
  - Championship: Lost to Edmonton Trappers 3 games to 1

== Alumni ==
Several Giants alumni like Willie McCovey, Bobby Bonds, Matt Williams, Steve Stone, and Kirt Manwaring played in Phoenix. Some of the Phoenix alumni went on to San Francisco, to take part in two of the Giants' National League titles (1962 and 1989).
