= 1993 New York Mets season =

1993 New York Mets
- League: National League
- Division: East
- Ballpark: Shea Stadium
- City: New York
- Record: 59–103 (.364)
- Divisional place: 7th
- Owners: Fred Wilpon and Nelson Doubleday, Jr.
- General managers: Al Harazin, Joe McIlvaine
- Managers: Jeff Torborg, Dallas Green
- Television: WWOR-TV/SportsChannel New York (Ralph Kiner, Tim McCarver, Fran Healy, Rusty Staub)
- Radio: WFAN (Bob Murphy, Gary Cohen, Todd Kalas); WSKQ-FM (spanish) (Juan Alicea, Billy Berroa, Renato Morffi, Armando Talavera)

The 1993 New York Mets season was the 32nd season in the history of the franchise. They played all of the home games at Shea Stadium. After a tumultuous season the year before, the Mets were looking to improve on their 72-90 record and perhaps get back into contention for the National League Eastern Division. Instead, the team performed significantly worse and sank further back in the standings, while the turmoil surrounding them continued into 1993.

For the first time since 1967, the Mets lost 100 games in a season. Their 59 wins were the least in a full 162 game season since 1964, when they won 53. Their 103 losses were the fifth most in franchise history, only trailing the first four teams the Mets fielded. They finished in seventh and last place in their division, their first last place finish since 1983, and recorded the worst record in baseball in 1993.

== Background ==
The 1993 Mets entered the season after a disappointing 1992 campaign where their major player acquisitions, designed to help the team return to contending for a division title, largely fizzled out. Their biggest acquisition, outfielder Bobby Bonilla, did not perform up to fans' expectations and was frequently booed by the local fans. Pitcher Bret Saberhagen and second baseman Willie Randolph, two more major pickups in the previous offseason, were injured much of the season and largely ineffective. One of the few bright spots was Eddie Murray, who led the team with 91 RBI to go along with 16 home runs, but besides he and Bonilla (74 RBI, 19 home runs) no Met reached 50 RBI or 15 home runs. Murray's .261 average led the regulars, who all struggled to record hits; shortstop Dick Schofield, for instance, recorded over 400 plate appearances but could not manage to reach 100 hits. Howard Johnson, the 1991 National League home run and RBI champion, also battled injuries and saw his totals fall off significantly. The pitching staff was not much better off, as Dwight Gooden recorded his worst season as a major leaguer and the team left a hole in its rotation by trading away ace David Cone in August; Gooden's 12 wins led the team.

Manager Jeff Torborg, who had come off two consecutive winning seasons with the Chicago White Sox, found himself unable to maintain control of the team. He had a particularly testy relationship with outfielder Vince Coleman, which eventually resulted in the former stolen base king's suspension in September.

== Offseason ==
The Mets were not as aggressive in pursuing other players as they had been in 1992 but made a splash in a trade, acquiring All-Star shortstop Tony Fernández in a trade with the San Diego Padres. Another significant acquisition was veteran starter Frank Tanana, who had spent the last eight years with the Detroit Tigers and would give the rotation an additional veteran to go with Gooden, Sid Fernandez, and Saberhagen. Neither man would be on the team by the end of the year, however, as Fernández was traded to the Toronto Blue Jays during the summer and Tanana was traded to the New York Yankees in September.

=== Moves ===
- October 26, 1992: Wally Whitehurst, D. J. Dozier and a player to be named later were traded by the Mets to the San Diego Padres for Tony Fernández. The Mets completed the deal by sending Raul Casanova to the Padres on December 7.
- November 17, 1992: José Martínez was drafted from the Mets by the Florida Marlins in the 1992 Major League Baseball expansion draft.
- December 2, 1992: Roger Mason was signed as a free agent by the Mets.
- December 17, 1992: Roger Mason and Mike Freitas (minors) were traded by the Mets to the San Diego Padres for Mike Maddux.
- December 22, 1992: Mauro Gozzo was signed as a free agent with the New York Mets.
- December 28, 1992: Eric Bullock was signed as a free agent by the Mets.

== Regular season ==
The Mets first game of the season was reminiscent of the first game of their 1969 championship season, as they hosted an expansion team in their very first game in franchise history; this time, the Colorado Rockies.

Once again, trouble courted the Mets in 1993. After Bob Klapisch and John Harper's chronicle of the 1992 season, The Worst Team Money Could Buy, came out early in the season, Bobby Bonilla confronted Klapisch after a game and tried to provoke him into a physical confrontation. In June, Bret Saberhagen filled a Super Soaker water gun with bleach and shot it at reporters in the clubhouse. Vince Coleman once again found himself in trouble when he struck Dwight Gooden with a golf club while swinging it wildly in the clubhouse and injured him. Later in the season, while in the car of Los Angeles Dodgers outfielder Eric Davis, Coleman tossed a lit firecracker toward a crowd of autograph seekers at Dodger Stadium, injuring three people when it exploded. This proved to be the last straw for the Mets and Coleman; he was placed on administrative leave following the incident and the team later announced that Coleman would not be with the team going forward.

After thirty-eight games, the Mets had decided enough was enough and relieved Torborg of his duties as manager. He became the third straight Mets skipper to be fired before the end of the season, following Davey Johnson and Bud Harrelson. Dallas Green, who had not managed a team since he was fired by the New York Yankees as their manager during the 1989 season but had been serving as a scout for the Mets, was promoted to replace him. With the team standing at 13–25, Green recorded only forty-six victories in his abbreviated first campaign and brought the Mets home with the worst record in baseball.

Al Harazin, who took over the general manager duties after Frank Cashen retired and was the man who made all of the moves that changed the franchise's direction in the 1992 offseason, resigned his position in June of 1993 after ownership decided to separate the business operation of the team from the baseball operation; Harazin was offered the position of vice president of business operation but declined, stating that it would feel "awkward" and that it would be "in the best interest for all concerned" for him to resign after thirteen years working for the Mets. In July, the Mets hired Joe McIlvane to take over as general manager and executive vice president of baseball operations; he had previously worked with the team as a scout and assistant to Cashen before leaving to become general manager of the San Diego Padres, but had resigned earlier in the season after the team began selling off many of its star players (like the Mets, the Padres would also finish with more than 100 losses and end the season in last place in their division).

Despite the poor record, some positives came from the Mets' lineup. Bonilla returned to the All-Star Game and hit a career high 34 home runs. Second baseman Jeff Kent, in his first full year as a starter, added 21 home runs with 80 RBI. Eddie Murray tallied 27 home runs, led the team with a .285 average, and recorded 100 RBI, the first time he had done that since he was with the Baltimore Orioles in 1985. 1993 also saw the debut of Bobby Jones, a rookie who would become a frontline starter for the Mets in the coming years.

Pitchingwise, Gooden's 12 wins led the team, but his 15 losses were tied with Tanana for second on the team. Fernandez was the only Met starter to record a sub-3.00 ERA, coming in at 2.97 with a 5-6 record. Saberhagen managed a 7-7 record, but was lost during the summer due to a severe knee injury. John Franco was again limited by injuries as the Mets' closer, recording just 10 saves in 35 appearances. The only Met to record a winning record as a pitcher was Dave Telgheder, who finished with a 6-2 mark over 24 appearances with seven starts despite having a 4.76 ERA.

=== Anthony Young ===
One of the stranger stories of the 1993 season was the losing streak recorded by pitcher Anthony Young. After winning his first two decisions of the 1992 season, Young would lose his final fourteen of the year. He picked up right where he left off in 1993, dropping thirteen straight games where he factored into the decision and breaking a record that was held by Boston Braves pitcher Cliff Curtis, who lost 23 straight decisions over the course of the 1910 and 1911 seasons.

Young's losing streak was snapped at 27 on July 28 against the expansion Florida Marlins. Young allowed an unearned run in the top of the ninth to give the Marlins a 4–3 lead. The Mets scored two runs in the bottom of the ninth against closer Bryan Harvey to win the game 5–4. The win was the only one Young recorded in 1993, and he went on to finish with a team high sixteen losses in thirty-nine appearances with ten starts.

=== Season standings ===
NL East
Team	W	L	Pct.	GB	Home	Road
Philadelphia Phillies	97	65	.599	—	52‍–‍29	45‍–‍36
Montreal Expos	94	68	.580	3	55‍–‍26	39‍–‍42
St. Louis Cardinals	87	75	.537	10	49‍–‍32	38‍–‍43
Chicago Cubs	84	78	.519	13	43‍–‍38	41‍–‍40
Pittsburgh Pirates	75	87	.463	22	40‍–‍41	35‍–‍46
Florida Marlins	64	98	.395	33	35‍–‍46	29‍–‍52
New York Mets	59	103	.364	38	28‍–‍53	31‍–‍50

=== Record vs. opponents ===
1993 National League record Source: MLB Standings Grid – 1993
Team	ATL	CHC	CIN	COL	FLA	HOU	LAD	MON	NYM	PHI	PIT	SD	SF	STL
Atlanta	—	7–5	10–3	13–0	7–5	8–5	8–5	7–5	9–3	6–6	7–5	9–4	7–6	6–6
Chicago	5–7	—	7–5	8–4	6–7	4–8	7–5	5–8–1	8–5	7–6	5–8	8–4	6–6	8–5
Cincinnati	3–10	5–7	—	9–4	7–5	6–7	5–8	4–8	6–6	4–8	8–4	9–4	2–11	5–7
Colorado	0–13	4–8	4–9	—	7–5	11–2	7–6	3–9	6–6	3–9	8–4	6–7	3–10	5–7
Florida	5–7	7–6	5–7	5–7	—	3–9	5–7	5–8	4–9	4–9	6–7	7–5	4–8	4–9
Houston	5–8	8–4	7–6	2–11	9–3	—	9–4	5–7	11–1	5–7	7–5	8–5	3–10	6–6
Los Angeles	5–8	5–7	8–5	6–7	7–5	4–9	—	6–6	8–4	2–10	8–4	9–4	7–6	6–6
Montreal	5–7	8–5–1	8–4	9–3	8–5	7–5	6–6	—	9–4	6–7	8–5	10–2	3–9	7–6
New York	3–9	5–8	6–6	6–6	9–4	1–11	4–8	4–9	—	3–10	4–9	5–7	4–8	5–8
Philadelphia	6-6	6–7	8–4	9–3	9–4	7–5	10–2	7–6	10–3	—	7–6	6–6	4–8	8–5
Pittsburgh	5–7	8–5	4–8	4–8	7–6	5–7	4–8	5–8	9–4	6–7	—	9–3	5–7	4–9
San Diego	4–9	4–8	4–9	7–6	5–7	5–8	4–9	2–10	7–5	6–6	3–9	—	3–10	7–5
San Francisco	6–7	6–6	11–2	10–3	8–4	10–3	6–7	9–3	8–4	8–4	7–5	10–3	—	4–8
St. Louis	6–6	5–8	7–5	7–5	9–4	6–6	6–6	6–7	8–5	5–8	9–4	5–7	8–4	—

=== Opening Day starters ===
- Bobby Bonilla
- Vince Coleman
- Tony Fernández
- Dwight Gooden
- Todd Hundley
- Howard Johnson
- Jeff Kent
- Eddie Murray
- Joe Orsulak

=== Notable transactions ===
- April 23, 1993: Jeff Kaiser was selected off waivers by the Mets from the Cincinnati Reds.
- May 14, 1993: Ced Landrum was signed as a free agent by the Mets.
- June 11, 1993: Tony Fernández was traded by the Mets to the Toronto Blue Jays for Darrin Jackson.
- June 12, 1993: Wayne Housie was traded by the Mets to the Milwaukee Brewers for Josías Manzanillo.

== Roster ==
1993 New York Mets
Roster
Pitchers: 47 Mike Draper; 50 Sid Fernandez; 31 John Franco; 45 Paul Gibson; 16 Dwight Gooden; 45 Mauro Gozzo; 35 Kenny Greer; 53 Eric Hillman; 40 Jeff Innis; 28 Bobby Jones; 56 Jeff Kaiser; 51 Mike Maddux; 39 Josías Manzanillo; 18 Bret Saberhagen; 48 Pete Schourek; 29 Frank Tanana; 38 Dave Telgheder; 43 Mickey Weston; 19 Anthony Young	Catchers: 9 Todd Hundley; 22 Charlie O'Brien; Infielders: 1 Kevin Baez; 23 Tim Bogar; 1 Tony Fernández; 10 Butch Huskey; 20 Howard Johnson; 12 Jeff Kent; 7,17 Jeff McKnight; 33 Eddie Murray; 36 Tito Navarro; 2 Doug Saunders; 34 Chico Walker	Outfielders: 25 Bobby Bonilla; 5 Jeromy Burnitz; 11 Vince Coleman; 8 Dave Gallagher; 2 Wayne Housie; 3 Darrin Jackson; 26 Ced Landrum; 6 Joe Orsulak; 44 Ryan Thompson	Manager: 46 Dallas Green (hired on May 21, 1993); 10 Jeff Torborg (fired on May 19, 1993); Coaches: 4 Mike Cubbage (third base); 26 Barry Foote (first base) (fired on May 19, 1993); 15 Darrell Johnson (unknown) (hired on May 21, 1993); 28 Dave LaRoche (bullpen) (fired on May 19, 1993); 27 Tom McCraw (hitting); 30 Mel Stottlemyre (pitching); 13 Steve Swisher (bullpen) (hired on September 1, 1993); 7 Bobby Wine (bench) (hired on May 22, 1993)

== Player stats ==
=== Batting ===
==== Starters by position ====
Note: Pos = Position; G = Games played; AB = At bats; H = Hits; Avg. = Batting average; HR = Home runs; RBI = Runs batted in; OPS = OBP + SLG (On base + slugging percentage)

Player	Pos	G	AB	H	Avg.	HR	RBI	OPS
Todd Hundley	C	130	417	95	.228	11	53	.626
Eddie Murray	1B	154	610	174	.285	27	100	.792
Jeff Kent	2B	140	496	134	.270	21	80	.765
Tim Bogar	SS	78	205	50	.244	3	25	.652
Howard Johnson	3B	72	235	56	.238	7	26	.732
Vince Coleman	LF	92	373	104	.279	2	25	.691
Ryan Thompson	CF	80	288	72	.250	11	26	.747
Bobby Bonilla	RF	139	502	133	.265	34	87	.874

==== Other batters ====
Note: G = Games played; AB = At bats; H = Hits; Avg. = Batting average; HR = Home runs; RBI = Runs batted in

Player	G	AB	H	Avg.	HR	RBI
Joe Orsulak	134	409	116	.284	8	35
Jeromy Burnitz	86	263	64	.243	13	38
Chico Walker	115	213	48	.225	5	19
Dave Gallagher	99	201	55	.274	6	28
Charlie O'Brien	67	188	48	.255	4	23
Tony Fernández	48	173	39	.225	1	14
Jeff McKnight	105	164	42	.256	2	13
Kevin Baez	52	126	23	.183	0	7
Darrin Jackson	31	87	17	.195	1	7
Doug Saunders	28	67	14	.209	0	0
Butch Huskey	13	41	6	.146	0	3
Ced Landrum	22	19	5	.263	0	1
Tito Navarro	12	17	1	.059	0	1
Wayne Housie	18	16	3	.188	0	1

=== Pitching ===
==== Starting pitchers ====
Note: G = Games pitched; IP = Innings pitched; W = Wins; L = Losses; ERA = Earned run average; SO = Strikeouts

Player	G	IP	W	L	ERA	SO
Dwight Gooden	29	208.2	12	15	3.45	149
Frank Tanana	29	183.0	7	15	4.48	104
Eric Hillman	27	145.0	2	9	3.97	60
Bret Saberhagen	19	139.1	7	7	3.29	93
Sid Fernandez	18	119.2	5	6	2.93	81
Bobby Jones	9	61.2	2	4	3.65	35

==== Other pitchers ====
Note: G = Games pitched; IP = Innings pitched; W = Wins; L = Losses; ERA = Earned run average; SO = Strikeouts

Player	G	IP	W	L	ERA	SO
Pete Schourek	41	128.1	5	12	5.96	72
Anthony Young	39	100.1	1	16	3.77	62
Dave Telgheder	24	75.2	6	2	4.76	35

==== Relief pitchers ====
Note: G = Games pitched; W = Wins; L = Losses; SV = Saves; ERA = Earned run average; SO = Strikeouts

Player	G	W	L	SV	ERA	SO
John Franco	35	4	3	10	5.20	29
Jeff Innis	67	2	3	3	4.11	36
Mike Maddux	58	3	8	5	3.60	57
Mike Draper	29	1	1	0	4.25	16
Mauro Gozzo	10	0	1	1	2.57	6
Paul Gibson	8	1	1	0	5.19	12
Josías Manzanillo	6	0	0	0	3.00	11
Jeff Kaiser	6	0	0	0	11.57	5
Mickey Weston	4	0	0	0	7.94	2
Kenny Greer	1	1	0	0	0.00	2

== Farm system ==
Level	Team	League	Manager
AAA	Norfolk Tides	International League	Clint Hurdle
AA	Binghamton Mets	Eastern League	Steve Swisher
A	St. Lucie Mets	Florida State League	John Tamargo
A	Capital City Bombers	South Atlantic League	Ron Washington
Short-Season A	Pittsfield Mets	New York–Penn League	Howie Freiling
Rookie	Kingsport Mets	Appalachian League	Ron Gideon
Rookie	GCL Mets	Gulf Coast League	Junior Roman
