= 1993 St. Louis Cardinals season =

Major League Baseball season

1993 St. Louis Cardinals
- League: National League
- Division: East
- Ballpark: Busch Memorial Stadium
- City: St. Louis, Missouri
- Record: 87–75 (.537)
- Divisional place: 3rd
- Owners: Anheuser-Busch
- General managers: Dal Maxvill
- Managers: Joe Torre
- Television: KPLR (Al Hrabosky, Joe Buck)
- Radio: KMOX (Jack Buck, Mike Shannon)

The 1993 St. Louis Cardinals season was the Cardinals' 112th season in St. Louis, Missouri and the 102nd season in the National League. Under their manager Joe Torre, the Cardinals went 87–75 during the season (their best record in the Torre era) and finished third in the National League East, ten games behind the NL Champion Philadelphia Phillies. This was the final season in the NL East for the Cardinals, before their move to the NL Central for the following season.

== Offseason ==
- December 7, 1992: Rex Hudler was released by the St. Louis Cardinals.
- February 22, 1993: Félix José and Craig Wilson were traded by the Cardinals to the Kansas City Royals for Gregg Jefferies and Ed Gerald (minors).

== Regular season ==
Reliever Lee Smith became baseball's all-time saves leader this year, which has since been surpassed.

On September 7 at Riverfront Stadium, Mark Whiten hit four massive home runs and had twelve runs batted in against the Cincinnati Reds. In the process, Whiten tied two Major League records in one game.

Gregg Jeffries finished third in the NL in batting (.342) and stole 46 bases, a club record for a first baseman.

=== Notable Transactions ===
- March 31, 1993: Mark Clark and Juan Andújar (minors) were traded by the Cardinals to the Cleveland Indians for Mark Whiten.
- June 3, 1993: Alan Benes was drafted by the Cardinals in the 1st round (16th pick) of the 1993 amateur draft. Player signed July 19, 1993.
- August 31, 1993: Lee Smith was traded by the Cardinals to the New York Yankees for Rich Batchelor.

=== Opening Day starters ===
- Bernard Gilkey
- Gregg Jefferies
- Ray Lankford
- Tom Pagnozzi
- Gerónimo Peña
- Ozzie Smith
- Bob Tewksbury
- Mark Whiten
- Todd Zeile

=== Season standings ===
NL East
Team	W	L	Pct.	GB	Home	Road
Philadelphia Phillies	97	65	.599	—	52‍–‍29	45‍–‍36
Montreal Expos	94	68	.580	3	55‍–‍26	39‍–‍42
St. Louis Cardinals	87	75	.537	10	49‍–‍32	38‍–‍43
Chicago Cubs	84	78	.519	13	43‍–‍38	41‍–‍40
Pittsburgh Pirates	75	87	.463	22	40‍–‍41	35‍–‍46
Florida Marlins	64	98	.395	33	35‍–‍46	29‍–‍52
New York Mets	59	103	.364	38	28‍–‍53	31‍–‍50

=== Record vs. opponents ===
1993 National League record Source: MLB Standings Grid – 1993
Team	ATL	CHC	CIN	COL	FLA	HOU	LAD	MON	NYM	PHI	PIT	SD	SF	STL
Atlanta	—	7–5	10–3	13–0	7–5	8–5	8–5	7–5	9–3	6–6	7–5	9–4	7–6	6–6
Chicago	5–7	—	7–5	8–4	6–7	4–8	7–5	5–8–1	8–5	7–6	5–8	8–4	6–6	8–5
Cincinnati	3–10	5–7	—	9–4	7–5	6–7	5–8	4–8	6–6	4–8	8–4	9–4	2–11	5–7
Colorado	0–13	4–8	4–9	—	7–5	11–2	7–6	3–9	6–6	3–9	8–4	6–7	3–10	5–7
Florida	5–7	7–6	5–7	5–7	—	3–9	5–7	5–8	4–9	4–9	6–7	7–5	4–8	4–9
Houston	5–8	8–4	7–6	2–11	9–3	—	9–4	5–7	11–1	5–7	7–5	8–5	3–10	6–6
Los Angeles	5–8	5–7	8–5	6–7	7–5	4–9	—	6–6	8–4	2–10	8–4	9–4	7–6	6–6
Montreal	5–7	8–5–1	8–4	9–3	8–5	7–5	6–6	—	9–4	6–7	8–5	10–2	3–9	7–6
New York	3–9	5–8	6–6	6–6	9–4	1–11	4–8	4–9	—	3–10	4–9	5–7	4–8	5–8
Philadelphia	6-6	6–7	8–4	9–3	9–4	7–5	10–2	7–6	10–3	—	7–6	6–6	4–8	8–5
Pittsburgh	5–7	8–5	4–8	4–8	7–6	5–7	4–8	5–8	9–4	6–7	—	9–3	5–7	4–9
San Diego	4–9	4–8	4–9	7–6	5–7	5–8	4–9	2–10	7–5	6–6	3–9	—	3–10	7–5
San Francisco	6–7	6–6	11–2	10–3	8–4	10–3	6–7	9–3	8–4	8–4	7–5	10–3	—	4–8
St. Louis	6–6	5–8	7–5	7–5	9–4	6–6	6–6	6–7	8–5	5–8	9–4	5–7	8–4	—

=== Roster ===
1993 St. Louis Cardinals
Roster
Pitchers: 43 René Arocha; 47,48 Rich Batchelor; 41 Todd Burns; 52 Rhéal Cormier; 35 Steve Dixon; 51 Lee Guetterman; 36 Paul Kilgus; 50 Les Lancaster; 32 Joe Magrane; 46 Rob Murphy; 00 Omar Olivares; 31 Donovan Osborne; 42 Mike Pérez; 47 Lee Smith; 39 Bob Tewksbury; 41,34 Tom Urbani; 38 Allen Watson	Catchers: 19 Tom Pagnozzi; 12 Erik Pappas; 29 Marc Ronan; 29 Héctor Villanueva; Infielders: 18 Luis Alicea; 44 Tripp Cromer; 25 Gregg Jefferies; 8 Tim Jones; 11 José Oquendo; 21 Gerónimo Peña; 28 Gerald Perry; 5 Stan Royer; 1 Ozzie Smith; 54 Tracy Woodson; 27 Todd Zeile	Outfielders: 33 Rod Brewer; 46 Ozzie Canseco; 23 Bernard Gilkey; 3 Brian Jordan; 16 Ray Lankford; 55 Lonnie Maclin; 22 Mark Whiten	Manager: 9 Joe Torre; Coaches: 10 Chris Chambliss (Hitting); 40 Joe Coleman (Pitching); 15 Dave Collins (First Base); 30 Bucky Dent (Third Base); 4 Gaylen Pitts (Bullpen); 2 Red Schoendienst (Bench)

== Player stats ==
=== Batting ===
==== Starters by position ====
Note: Pos = Position; G = Games played; AB = At bats; H = Hits; Avg. = Batting average; HR = Home runs; RBI = Runs batted in

Pos	Player	G	AB	H	Avg.	HR	RBI
C	Tom Pagnozzi	92	330	85	.258	7	41
1B	Greg Jefferies	142	544	186	.342	16	83
2B	Luis Alicea	115	362	101	.279	3	46
SS	Ozzie Smith	141	545	157	.288	1	53
3B	Todd Zeile	157	571	158	.277	17	103
LF	Bernard Gilkey	137	557	170	.305	16	70
CF	Ray Lankford	127	407	97	.238	7	45
RF	Mark Whiten	152	562	142	.253	25	99

==== Other batters ====
Note: G = Games played; AB = At bats; H = Hits; Avg. = Batting average; HR = Home runs; RBI = Runs batted in

Player	G	AB	H	Avg.	HR	RBI
Gerónimo Peña	74	254	65	.256	5	30
Erik Pappas	82	228	63	.276	1	28
Brian Jordan	67	223	69	.309	10	44
Rod Brewer	110	147	42	.286	2	20
Gerald Perry	96	98	33	.337	4	16
Tracy Woodson	62	77	16	.208	0	2
José Oquendo	46	73	15	.205	0	4
Tim Jones	29	61	16	.262	0	1
Héctor Villanueva	17	55	8	.145	3	9
Stan Royer	24	46	14	.304	1	8
Tripp Cromer	10	23	2	.087	0	0
Ozzie Canseco	6	17	3	.176	0	0
Lonnie Maclin	12	13	1	.077	0	1
Marc Ronan	6	12	1	.083	0	0

=== Pitching ===
==== Starting pitchers ====
Note; G = Games pitched, IP = Innings pitched, W = Wins, L = Losses, ERA = Earned run average, SO = Strikeouts

Player	G	IP	W	L	ERA	SO
Bob Tewksbury	32	213.2	17	10	3.83	97
René Arocha	32	188.0	11	8	3.78	96
Donovan Osborne	26	155.2	10	7	3.76	83
Joe Magrane	22	116.0	8	10	4.97	38
Allen Watson	16	86.0	6	7	4.60	49

==== Other pitchers ====
Note; G = Games pitched, IP = Innings pitched, W = Wins, L = Losses, ERA = Earned run average, SO = Strikeouts

Player	G	IP	W	L	ERA	SO
Rhéal Cormier	38	145.1	7	6	4.33	75
Omar Olivares	58	118.2	5	3	4.17	63
Tom Urbani	18	62.0	1	3	4.65	33

==== Relief pitchers ====
Note; G = Games pitched, W = Wins, L = Losses, SV = Saves, ERA = Earned run average, SO = Strikeouts

Player	G	W	L	SV	ERA	SO
Lee Smith	55	2	4	43	4.50	49
Rob Murphy	73	5	7	1	4.87	41
Mike Pérez	65	7	2	7	2.48	58
Les Lancaster	50	4	1	0	2.93	36
Lee Guetterman	40	3	3	1	2.93	19
Todd Burns	24	0	4	0	6.16	10
Paul Kilgus	22	1	0	1	0.63	21
Rich Batchelor	9	0	0	0	8.10	4
Steve Dixon	4	0	0	0	33.75	2
Rod Brewer	1	0	0	0	45.00	1

== Farm system ==
Level	Team	League	Manager
AAA	Louisville Redbirds	American Association	Jack Krol
AA	Arkansas Travelers	Texas League	Joe Pettini
A	St. Petersburg Cardinals	Florida State League	Terry Kennedy
A	Springfield Cardinals	Midwest League	Mike Ramsey
A	Savannah Cardinals	South Atlantic League	Chris Maloney
A-Short Season	Glens Falls Redbirds	New York–Penn League	Steve Turco
Rookie	Johnson City Cardinals	Appalachian League	Joe Cunningham, Jr.
Rookie	AZL Cardinals	Arizona League	Roy Silver

LEAGUE CHAMPIONS: Savannah
