= Wayne Housie =

American baseball player (born 1965)

- Outfielder
- Born: May 20, 1965 (age 60); Hampton, Virginia, U.S.
- Batted: Both Threw: Right

MLB debut
- September 17, 1991, for the Boston Red Sox

Last MLB appearance
- June 9, 1993, for the New York Mets

MLB statistics
- Games played: 29
- Batting average: .208
- Runs scored: 4
- Runs batted in: 1
- Stats at Baseball Reference

Teams
- Boston Red Sox (1991); New York Mets (1993)

Wayne Tyrone Housie (born May 20, 1965) is an American former Major League Baseball outfielder. Listed at 5'9", 165 lb., he was a switch-hitter and threw right-handed.

Housie was originally drafted by the Detroit Tigers in the eighth round of the January 1986 amateur draft. Over four seasons in their farm system, Housie batted .245 with nine home runs and 141 runs batted in. He was released at the end of Spring training 1990, and signed with the Salinas Spurs of the California League. His .270 batting average, five home runs and 49 RBIs were enough to catch the eye of the Boston Red Sox, who signed him on August 2. He was batting .274 with one home run and twelve RBIs at double A when a knee injury to Mike Greenwell got him a call up to the majors. He made his major league debut on September 17 as a pinch runner for Jack Clark.

After being called upon to bunt the next day, and two more pinch running appearances, Housie got his first official at bat on September 27 against Chris Bosio & the Milwaukee Brewers. Pinch hitting for Bob Zupcic, he singled, and came around to score on a Jody Reed single. For the season, he went two-for-eight with two runs scored.

Housie remained in the BoSox farm system through the 1992 season. After which, he signed a minor league deal with the New York Mets. A month into the 1993 season, Housie was called up to the majors in place of struggling prospect Ryan Thompson. In his first at bat as a Met, Housie singled, and came around to score on a Tony Fernández triple. He got his only career RBI on May 14 against Scott Aldred & the Montreal Expos. After eighteen games with the Mets, Housie was traded to the Milwaukee Brewers for pitcher Josias Manzanillo. In one season in their organization, he batted .274 with seven RBIs for the New Orleans Zephyrs.

He returned to the Red Sox organization in 1994, and split the 1995 season between the Mexican League and Western Baseball League before retiring. In a two-season career, Housie was a .208 hitter (5-for-24) with two doubles and no home runs in 29 games. He scored four runs and had one stolen base. He made six outfield appearances at center field (4) and right (2), without committing an error in three chances for a collective 1.000 fielding percentage. He also served as a designated hitter in two games.
