= 1993 Los Angeles Dodgers season =

1993 Los Angeles Dodgers
- League: National League
- Division: West
- Ballpark: Dodger Stadium
- City: Los Angeles
- Record: 81–81 (.500)
- Divisional place: 4th
- Owners: Peter O'Malley
- General managers: Fred Claire
- Managers: Tommy Lasorda
- Television: KTLA (5)
- Radio: KABC; Vin Scully, Ross Porter, Don Drysdale (through July 2), Rick Monday; KWKW; Jaime Jarrín, René Cárdenas; KYPA; Richard Choi

The 1993 Los Angeles Dodgers season was the 104th for the Los Angeles Dodgers in Major League Baseball, and their 36th season in Los Angeles, California.

The team improved on the dismal 1992 season, finishing fourth in the National League West. This was in part thanks to Rookie of the Year winner catcher Mike Piazza. Piazza set rookie records with 35 home runs and 112 RBI. He also hit two home runs on the last day of the season as the Dodgers knocked their longtime rival the Giants out of playoff contention with a 12–1 victory at Dodger Stadium.

The season was marred by the sudden death of Hall of Fame pitcher Don Drysdale, who had been a broadcaster since his retirement in 1969. Drysdale, who pitched on three World Series championship teams in Los Angeles (1959, 1963, 1965), was found dead in his Montreal hotel room July 3 prior to the Dodgers' game vs. the Expos.

To date, this is the only season in Dodger history where the team has finished exactly at .500 and not above or below it.

== Offseason ==
- November 17, 1992: Acquired Jody Reed from the Colorado Rockies for Rudy Seánez
- December 5, 1992: Cory Snyder was signed as a free agent.
- December 24, 1992: Acquired Tim Wallach from the Montreal Expos for Tim Barker
- January 12, 1993: Kevin Elster was signed as a free agent.

== Regular season ==
=== Season standings ===
NL West
Team	W	L	Pct.	GB	Home	Road
Atlanta Braves	104	58	.642	—	51‍–‍30	53‍–‍28
San Francisco Giants	103	59	.636	1	50‍–‍31	53‍–‍28
Houston Astros	85	77	.525	19	44‍–‍37	41‍–‍40
Los Angeles Dodgers	81	81	.500	23	41‍–‍40	40‍–‍41
Cincinnati Reds	73	89	.451	31	41‍–‍40	32‍–‍49
Colorado Rockies	67	95	.414	37	39‍–‍42	28‍–‍53
San Diego Padres	61	101	.377	43	34‍–‍47	27‍–‍54

=== Record vs. opponents ===
1993 National League record Source: MLB Standings Grid – 1993
Team	ATL	CHC	CIN	COL	FLA	HOU	LAD	MON	NYM	PHI	PIT	SD	SF	STL
Atlanta	—	7–5	10–3	13–0	7–5	8–5	8–5	7–5	9–3	6–6	7–5	9–4	7–6	6–6
Chicago	5–7	—	7–5	8–4	6–7	4–8	7–5	5–8–1	8–5	7–6	5–8	8–4	6–6	8–5
Cincinnati	3–10	5–7	—	9–4	7–5	6–7	5–8	4–8	6–6	4–8	8–4	9–4	2–11	5–7
Colorado	0–13	4–8	4–9	—	7–5	11–2	7–6	3–9	6–6	3–9	8–4	6–7	3–10	5–7
Florida	5–7	7–6	5–7	5–7	—	3–9	5–7	5–8	4–9	4–9	6–7	7–5	4–8	4–9
Houston	5–8	8–4	7–6	2–11	9–3	—	9–4	5–7	11–1	5–7	7–5	8–5	3–10	6–6
Los Angeles	5–8	5–7	8–5	6–7	7–5	4–9	—	6–6	8–4	2–10	8–4	9–4	7–6	6–6
Montreal	5–7	8–5–1	8–4	9–3	8–5	7–5	6–6	—	9–4	6–7	8–5	10–2	3–9	7–6
New York	3–9	5–8	6–6	6–6	9–4	1–11	4–8	4–9	—	3–10	4–9	5–7	4–8	5–8
Philadelphia	6-6	6–7	8–4	9–3	9–4	7–5	10–2	7–6	10–3	—	7–6	6–6	4–8	8–5
Pittsburgh	5–7	8–5	4–8	4–8	7–6	5–7	4–8	5–8	9–4	6–7	—	9–3	5–7	4–9
San Diego	4–9	4–8	4–9	7–6	5–7	5–8	4–9	2–10	7–5	6–6	3–9	—	3–10	7–5
San Francisco	6–7	6–6	11–2	10–3	8–4	10–3	6–7	9–3	8–4	8–4	7–5	10–3	—	4–8
St. Louis	6–6	5–8	7–5	7–5	9–4	6–6	6–6	6–7	8–5	5–8	9–4	5–7	8–4	—

=== Opening Day lineup ===
Opening Day starters
Name	Position
José Offerman	Shortstop
Brett Butler	Center fielder
Darryl Strawberry	Right fielder
Eric Davis	Left fielder
Tim Wallach	Third baseman
Eric Karros	First baseman
Mike Piazza	Catcher
Jody Reed	Second baseman
Orel Hershiser	Starting pitcher

== Notable transactions ==
- April 20, 1993: Ken Dayley was signed as a free agent.
- May 17, 1993: Kevin Elster was released.
- September 7, 1993: Acquired John DeSilva from the Detroit Tigers for Eric Davis

=== Roster ===
1993 Los Angeles Dodgers
Roster
Pitchers: 56 Pedro Astacio; 49 Tom Candiotti; 54 Omar Daal; 60 John DeSilva; 35 Jim Gott; 46 Kevin Gross; 47 Kip Gross; 55 Orel Hershiser; 45 Pedro Martínez; 48 Ramón Martínez; 17 Roger McDowell; 57 Rod Nichols; 36 Ricky Trlicek; 50 Steve Wilson; 38 Todd Worrell	Catchers: 41 Carlos Hernández; 31 Mike Piazza; Infielders: 21 Rafael Bournigal; 5,15 Dave Hansen; 29 Lenny Harris; 23 Eric Karros; 30 José Offerman; 3 Jody Reed; 27 Mike Sharperson; 25 Tim Wallach	Outfielders: 7 Billy Ashley; 64 Jerry Brooks; 22 Brett Butler; 33 Eric Davis; 47 Tom Goodwin; 43 Raúl Mondesí; 26 Henry Rodríguez; 28 Cory Snyder; 44 Darryl Strawberry; 20 Mitch Webster	Manager: 2 Tommy Lasorda; Coaches: 8 Joey Amalfitano (third base); 58 Mark Cresse (bullpen); 13 Joe Ferguson (first base); 35 Ben Hines (hitting); 11 Manny Mota; 16 Ron Perranoski (pitching); 68 Ron Roenicke (bench)

== Game log ==
=== Regular season ===
Legend
	Dodgers win
	Dodgers loss
	Postponement
	Eliminated from playoff race
**Bold**	Dodgers team member

1993 regular season game log: 81–81 (Home: 41–40; Away: 40–41)
April: 8–15 (Home: 4–5; Away: 4–10)

#	Date	Time (PT)	Opponent	Score	Win	Loss	Save	Time of Game	Attendance	Record	Box/ Streak
4	April 8		@ Braves	L 1–6						2–2	L1
5	April 9		@ Braves	L 0–2						2–3	L2
6	April 10		@ Braves	**W** 2–1 (10)						3–3	W1
7	April 11		@ Braves	L 0–3						3–4	L1
8	April 13		Cardinals	L 7–9						3–5	L2
9	April 14		Cardinals	L 1–2 (15)						3–6	L3
10	April 15		Cardinals	L 2–4						3–7	L4
11	April 16		Pirates	**W** 7–4						4–7	W1
12	April 17		Pirates	**W** 6–3						5–7	W2
13	April 18		Pirates	**W** 6–4						6–7	W3
14	April 20		@ Expos	L 3–7						6–8	L1
15	April 21		@ Expos	L 4–6						6–9	L2
16	April 22		@ Expos	L 1–3						6–10	L3
17	April 23		@ Phillies	L 0–2						6–11	L4
18	April 24		@ Phillies	L 3–7						6–12	L5
19	April 25		@ Phillies	L 2–5						6–13	L6
21	April 28		Expos	**W** 6–1						8–13	W2
22	April 29		Expos	L 3–7						8–14	L1
23	April 30		Phillies	L 6–7						8–15	L2

May: 18–8 (Home: 12–1; Away: 6–7)

#	Date	Time (PT)	Opponent	Score	Win	Loss	Save	Time of Game	Attendance	Record	Box/ Streak
24	May 1		Phillies	**W** 5–1						9–15	W1
25	May 2		Phillies	L 1–9						9–16	L1
28	May 7		@ Giants	L 5–8						11–17	L1
29	May 8		@ Giants	**W** 5–2 (12)						12–17	W1
30	May 9		@ Giants	**W** 6–4						13–17	W2
31	May 10		@ Cubs	L 2–6						13–18	L1
32	May 11		@ Cubs	L 1–2 (10)						13–19	L2
33	May 12		@ Cubs	**W** 9–3						14–19	W1
34	May 14		@ Astros	L 1–9						14–20	L1
35	May 15		@ Astros	L 1–7						14–21	L2
36	May 16		@ Astros	L 2–3						14–22	L3
37	May 17		Reds	**W** 5–4 (10)						15–22	W1
38	May 18		Reds	**W** 9–1						16–22	W2
39	May 17		Reds	**W** 5–2						17–22	W3
46	May 28		@ Pirates	**W** 7–2						24–22	W10
47	May 29		@ Pirates	**W** 6–1						25–22	W11
48	May 30		@ Pirates	L 3–5						25–23	L1
49	May 31		@ Cardinals	**W** 5–1						26–23	W1

June: 14–13 (Home: 8–7; Away: 6–6)

#	Date	Time (PT)	Opponent	Score	Win	Loss	Save	Time of Game	Attendance	Record	Box/ Streak
50	June 1		@ Cardinals	**W** 11–6						27–23	W2
51	June 2		@ Cardinals	L 4–5						27–24	L1
52	June 4		Braves	**W** 5–4						28–24	W1
53	June 5		Braves	**W** 5–1						29–24	W2
54	June 6		Braves	L 0–2						29–25	L1
64	June 18		@ Reds	L 3–4 (10)						34–30	W1
65	June 19		@ Reds	L 4–8						34–31	W1
66	June 20		@ Reds	**W** 6–3						35–31	W1
67	June 21		Astros	**W** 7–0						36–31	W2
68	June 22		Astros	L 1–5						36–32	L1
69	June 23		Astros	L 3–5						36–33	L2
70	June 24		Astros	L 0–1						36–34	L3
71	June 25		Cubs	L 5–8 (10)						36–35	L4
72	June 26		Cubs	**W** 5–4						37–35	W1
73	June 27		Cubs	**W** 3–1						38–35	W2
74	June 28		Giants	**W** 4–0						39–35	W3
75	June 29		Giants	L 1–3						39–36	L1
76	June 30		Giants	**W** 5–3						40–36	W1

July: 14–13 (Home: 5–6; Away: 9–7)

#	Date	Time (PT)	Opponent	Score	Win	Loss	Save	Time of Game	Attendance	Record	Box/ Streak
77	July 2		@ Expos	**W** 4–3						41–36	W2
78	July 3		@ Expos	L 4–6						41–37	L1
79	July 4		@ Expos	**W** 1–0 (11)						42–37	W1
80	July 5		@ Phillies	L 5–9						42–38	L1
81	July 6		@ Phillies	**W** 7–5						43–38	W1
82	July 7		@ Phillies	L 6–7 (20)						43–39	L1
—	July 13	5:40 p.m. PDT	64th All-Star Game	National League vs. American League (Oriole Park at Camden Yards, Baltimore, Maryland)							
88	July 15		Expos	**W** 3–2						47–41	W2
90	July 16		Expos	**W** 2–1						48–41	W3
91	July 17		Expos	L 6–9 (10)						48–42	L1
92	July 18		Expos	**W** 2–1						49–42	W1
92	July 19		Phillies	L 5–7						49–43	L1
93	July 20		Phillies	L 2–8						49–44	L2
94	July 21		Phillies	L 0–7						49–45	L3
99	July 26		@ Giants	**W** 15–1						52–47	W1
100	July 27		@ Giants	L 2–3						52–48	L1
101	July 28		@ Giants	**W** 2–1						53–48	W1
102	July 30		@ Cubs	L 1–2						53–49	L1
103	July 31		@ Cubs	**W** 7–2 (13)						54–49	W1

August: 12–15 (Home: 6–10; Away: 6–5)

#	Date	Time (PT)	Opponent	Score	Win	Loss	Save	Time of Game	Attendance	Record	Box/ Streak
104	August 1		@ Cubs	L 4–10						54–49	L1
105	August 3		@ Astros	L 1–6						54–51	L2
106	August 4		@ Astros	**W** 4–2						55–51	W1
107	August 5		@ Astros	**W** 5–2						56–51	W2
108	August 6		Reds	**W** 3–2						57–51	W3
109	August 7		Reds	L 6–9						57–52	L1
110	August 8		Reds	L 5–8						57–53	L2
118	August 17		@ Braves	L 2–3						59–59	L1
119	August 18		@ Braves	L 4–5 (12)						59–60	L2
120	August 19		@ Braves	**W** 7–5						60–60	W1
121	August 20		@ Cardinals	**W** 3–2						61–60	W2
122	August 21		@ Cardinals	**W** 8–4						62–60	W3
123	August 22		@ Cardinals	**W** 3–0						63–60	W4
124	August 23		Pirates	**W** 6–1						64–60	W5
125	August 24		Pirates	**W** 13–4						65–60	W6
126	August 25		Pirates	L 1–2 (12)						65–65	L1
127	August 27		Cardinals	L 2–3 (10)						65–62	L2
128	August 28		Cardinals	L 3–4						65–63	L3
129	August 29		Cardinals	**W** 8–3						66–63	W1
130	August 31		@ Pirates	L 2–6						66–64	L1

September: 14–15 (Home: 5–9; Away: 9–6)

#	Date	Time (PT)	Opponent	Score	Win	Loss	Save	Time of Game	Attendance	Record	Box/ Streak
131	September 1		@ Pirates	L 1–5						66–65	L2
132	September 2		@ Pirates	**W** 4–0						67–65	W1
136	September 6		Braves	**W** 2–1						70–66	W1
137	September 7		Braves	L 0–1						70–67	L1
138	September 8		Braves	L 2–8						70–68	L2
149	September 20		@ Reds	**W** 5–2						76–73	W1
150	September 21		@ Reds	**W** 5–3 (10)						77–73	W2
151	September 22		@ Reds	**W** 3–1						78–73	W31
152	September 23		@ Reds	L 2–11						78–74	L
153	September 24		Astros	**W** 6–3						79–74	W1
154	September 25		Astros	L 4–12						79–75	L1
155	September 26		Astros	L 4–5						79–76	L2
156	September 27		Cubs	L 3–7						79–77	L3
157	September 28		Cubs	**W** 6–5						80–77	W1
158	September 29		Cubs	L 1–6						80–78	L1
159	September 30		Giants	L 1–3						80–79	L2

October: 1–2 (Home: 1–2; Away: 0–0)

#	Date	Time (PT)	Opponent	Score	Win	Loss	Save	Time of Game	Attendance	Record	Box/ Streak
160	October 1		Giants	L 7–8						80–80	L3
161	October 2		Giants	L 3–5						80–81	L4
162	October 3		Giants	**W** 12–1						81–81	W1

=== Detailed records ===
**National League**
Opponent	Home	Away	Total	Pct.	Runs scored	Runs allowed
**NL East**
Chicago Cubs	3–3	2–4	5–7	.417	47	56
Florida Marlins	3–3	4–2	7–5	.583	43	38
Montreal Expos	4–2	2–4	6–6	.500	39	46
Philadelphia Phillies	1–5	1–5	2–10	.167	42	74
Pittsburgh Pirates	5–1	3–3	8–4	.667	62	37
St. Louis Cardinals	1–5	5–1	6–6	.500	57	43
	**17–19**	**17–19**	**34–38**	**.472**	**290**	**294**
**NL West**
Atlanta Braves	3–3	2–5	5–8	.385	30	42
Cincinnati Reds	4–2	4–3	8–5	.615	61	58
Colorado Rockies	3–4	3–3	6–7	.462	67	52
Houston Astros	2–5	2–4	4–9	.308	39	60
**Los Angeles Dodgers**	—	—	—	—	—	—
San Francisco Giants	3–4	4–2	7–6	.538	68	42
	**15–18**	**15–17**	**30–35**	**.462**	**265**	**254**

== Starting Pitchers stats ==
Note: G = Games pitched; GS = Games started; IP = Innings pitched; W/L = Wins/Losses; ERA = Earned run average; BB = Walks allowed; SO = Strikeouts; CG = Complete games

Name	G	GS	IP	W/L	ERA	BB	SO	CG
Orel Hershiser	33	33	215.2	12-14	3.59	72	141	5
Tom Candiotti	33	32	213.2	8-10	3.12	71	155	2
Ramón Martínez	32	32	211.2	10-12	3.44	104	127	4
Kevin Gross	33	32	202.1	13-13	4.14	74	150	3
Pedro Astacio	31	31	186.1	14-9	3.57	68	122	3

== Relief Pitchers stats ==
Note: G = Games pitched; GS = Games started; IP = Innings pitched; W/L = Wins/Losses; ERA = Earned run average; BB = Walks allowed; SO = Strikeouts; SV = Saves

Name	G	GS	IP	W/L	ERA	BB	SO	SV
Jim Gott	62	0	77.2	4-8	2.32	17	67	25
Pedro Martínez	65	2	107.0	10-5	2.61	57	119	2
Roger McDowell	54	0	68.0	5-3	2.25	30	27	2
Omar Daal	47	0	35.1	2-3	5.09	21	19	0
Ricky Trlicek	41	0	64.0	1-2	4.08	21	41	1
Todd Worrell	35	0	38.2	1-1	6.05	11	31	5
Steve Wilson	25	0	25.2	1-0	4.56	14	23	1
Kip Gross	10	0	15.0	0-0	0.60	4	12	0
Rod Nichols	4	0	6.1	0-1	5.68	2	3	0
John DeSilva	3	0	5.1	0-0	6.75	1	6	0

== Batting Stats ==
Note: Pos = Position; G = Games played; AB = At bats; Avg. = Batting average; R = Runs scored; H = Hits; HR = Home runs; RBI = Runs batted in; SB = Stolen bases

Name	Pos	G	AB	Avg.	R	H	HR	RBI	SB
Mike Piazza	C	149	547	.318	81	174	35	112	3
Carlos Hernández	C	50	99	.253	6	25	2	7	0
Eric Karros	1B	158	619	.247	74	153	23	80	0
Jody Reed	2B	132	445	.276	48	123	2	31	1
José Offerman	SS	158	590	.269	77	159	1	62	30
Tim Wallach	3B/1B	133	477	.222	42	106	12	62	0
Lenny Harris	2B/SS/3B/OF	107	160	.238	20	38	2	11	3
Dave Hansen	3B	84	105	.362	13	38	4	30	0
Mike Sharperson	2B/SS/3B/1B/OF	73	90	.256	13	23	2	10	2
Rafael Bournigal	2B	8	18	.500	0	9	0	3	0
Eric Davis	OF	108	376	.234	57	88	14	53	33
Brett Butler	CF	156	607	.298	80	181	1	42	39
Cory Snyder	OF	143	516	.266	61	137	11	56	4
Henry Rodríguez	OF	76	176	.222	20	39	8	23	1
Mitch Webster	OF	88	172	.244	26	42	2	14	4
Darryl Strawberry	OF	32	100	.140	12	14	5	12	1
Raúl Mondesí	RF	42	86	.291	13	25	4	10	4
Billy Ashley	LF	14	37	.243	0	9	0	0	0
Tom Goodwin	OF	30	17	.294	6	5	1	1	1
Jerry Brooks	OF	9	9	.222	2	2	1	1	0

== 1993 Awards ==
- 1993 Major League Baseball All-Star Game
  - Mike Piazza reserve
- Rookie of the Year Award
  - Mike Piazza
- Baseball Digest Rookie All-Star
  - Mike Piazza
  - Pedro Martínez
- Silver Slugger Award
  - Mike Piazza
  - Orel Hershiser
- TSN Rookie of the Year Award
  - Mike Piazza
- TSN National League All-Star
  - Mike Piazza
- Player of the Week
  - Mike Piazza (Apr. 26 – May 2)
  - Mike Piazza (June 14–20)
  - Mike Piazza (May 16–22)

== Farm system ==
Level	Team	League	Manager
AAA	Albuquerque Dukes	Pacific Coast League	Bill Russell
AA	San Antonio Missions	Texas League	Glenn Hoffman
High A	Bakersfield Dodgers	California League	Rick Dempsey
High A	Vero Beach Dodgers	Florida State League	Joe Vavra
A-Short Season	Yakima Bears	Northwest League	John Shoemaker
Rookie	Great Falls Dodgers	Pioneer League	Jon Debus
Rookie	DSL Dodgers; DSL Dodgers/Angels	Dominican Summer League	

== Major League Baseball draft ==
The Dodgers selected 57 players in this draft. Of those, seven of them would eventually play Major League baseball. The Dodgers lost their second round pick as a result of signing free agent pitcher Todd Worrell.

With the second overall pick in the draft the Dodgers selected right-handed pitcher Darren Dreifort from Wichita State University. Dreifort became one of only a select few players to make his professional debut in the Majors, without first appearing in a minor league game. He would play nine years in the Majors (all of them with the Dodgers), though serious injuries caused him to miss two full seasons and ultimately ended his career. His record was 48-60 with a 4.36 ERA in 274 games (113 starts).

In the 25th round, they selected catcher Paul Lo Duca from Arizona State University. In 11 seasons (seven with the Dodgers), he hit .286 with 80 homers and 481 RBIs while being a four time All-Star. LoDuca would later be mentioned in the Mitchell Report, which claimed that he had used human growth hormone (HGH) throughout his career and in fact contributed to other members of the Dodgers also using HGH.

1993 draft picks

Round	Name	Position	School	Signed	Career span	Highest level
1	Darren Dreifort	RHP	Wichita State University	Yes	1994–2005	MLB
3	Dax Winslett	RHP	Arizona State University	Yes	1993–1997	AA
4	Nate Bland	LHP	Mountain Brook High School	Yes	1993–2007	MLB
5	Scott Hunter	C	Northeast High School	Yes	1994–2003	AAA
6	Nate Yeskie	RHP	Carson City High School	No; Twins-1996	1996–2001	AA
7	Doug Newstrom	1B	Arizona State University	Yes	1993–2000	AAA
8	Jose Prado	RHP	University of Miami	Yes	1993–1998	AA
9	Matt Schwenke	C	University of California, Los Angeles	Yes	1993–1998	AAA
10	John Vukson	RHP	Sanger High School	Yes	1993–1995	A-
11	Joshua Rash	OF	Arlington Lamar High School	Yes	1993–1994	A-
12	Craig Scheffler	LHP	University of Wisconsin–Milwaukee	Yes	1993–1997	A+
13	Brian Rolocut	RHP	Miami Dade College, Wolfson Campus	Yes	1993–1997	A+
14	Brett Binkley	LHP	Georgia Institute of Technology	Yes	1993–1995	A+
15	Dave Steed	C	Meridian Community College	Yes	1993–2001	AAA
16	Dan Hubbs	RHP	University of Southern California	Yes	1993–1999	AAA
17	Michael Biltimier	1B	Purdue University	Yes	1993–1995	A+
18	Joe Lagarde	RHP	East Forsyth High School	Yes	1993–1998	AAA
19	Eric Maloney	RHP	Creighton University	No		
20	Mike Kinney	OF	Texas Tech University	Yes	1993–1994	A+
21	Mark Watson	LHP	Marist School	No; Brewers-1996	1996–2007	MLB
22	Charlie Nelson	OF	University of Minnesota	Yes	1994–1999	AA
23	Eddie Davis	OF	California State University, Long Beach	Yes	1993–1999	AA
24	Carl South	RHP	Marist School	Yes	1993–1998	A
25	Paul Lo Duca	C	Arizona State University	Yes	1993–2010	MLB
26	Corey Coggburn	OF	Ada High School	No		
27	Bryan Coyle	RHP	Hudson's Bay High School	Yes	1994–1995	A-
28	Jeffrey Astgen	2B	El Camino Real High School	No		
29	Anthony Cellars	OF	Texas High School	No		
30	Adrian Black	OF	North Brunswick High School	No		
31	Doug Davis	LHP	North Gate High School	No; Rangers-1996	1996–2012	MLB
32	Jordan Zimmerman	LHP	Brenham High School	No; Mariners-1994	1995–2004	MLB
33	Raul Correra	OF	Carmen Belen Veiga High School	No		
34	Dwayne McCray	RHP	Sumter High School	No		
35	Tracy Johnson	OF	Deer Valley High School	No		
36	Matt Wagner	RHP	Iowa State University	No; Mariners-1994	1994–2003	MLB
37	Richard Shaw	RHP	Sandwich SS High School	No		
38	Mark Manbeck	RHP	Round Rock High School	No; Phillies-1997	1997–1998	A
39	David Propst	OF	West Charlotte High School	No		
40	Dion Rhodes	OF	Hudson's Bay High School	No		
41	Eric Yanz	RHP	Arvada West High School	No; Royals-1997	1997–1998	A
42	Bruce Yard	SS	Indiana University of Pennsylvania	Yes	1993–1997	AA
43	Thomas Cody	C	Fort Vancouver High School	No		
44	Bruce Piddington	RHP	Southwestern High School	No	1997–1999	Ind
45	Ben Padilla	SS	Carson High School	No		
46	Gus Rubio	1B	Leuzinger High School	No		
47	Jason Smith	RHP	Meridian Community College	No		
48	Jeff Falardeau	LHP	Notre Dame High School	No		
49	Julio Colon	RHP	California State University, Long Beach	Yes	1994–1996	AA
50	Richard Condon	2B	Crossroads School for Arts & Sciences	No		
51	Kendall Hill	RHP	Escambia High School	No; Braves-1994	1994–2001	A+
52	Nathan Rasmussen	1B	Lakeville High School	Yes	1994–1995	A+
53	Victor Sobieraj	RHP	Catholic Central High School	No		
54	David Wease	1B	Chesnee High School	No		
55	Jamie Bane	LHP	Paradise Valley High School	No; Angels-1997	1997–1999	A+
56	Steve Huls	SS	Rocori High School	No; Twins-1996	1996–2000	AAA
57	Brian Carpenter	RHP	University of Texas at Austin	Yes	1993–1995	A+
58	Matthew Powell	RHP	Miami Dade College, Wolfson Campus	No		
