= 1993 Houston Astros season =

32nd season in Major League Baseball for the Houston Astros

1993 Houston Astros
- League: National League
- Division: West
- Ballpark: The Astrodome
- City: Houston, Texas
- Record: 85–77 (.525)
- Divisional place: 3rd
- Owners: John McMullen, Drayton McLane, Jr.
- General managers: Bill Wood
- Managers: Art Howe
- Television: KTXH; HSE
- Radio: KPRC (AM) (Bill Brown, Milo Hamilton, Larry Dierker, Vince Controneo, Bill Worrell, Enos Cabell); KXYZ (Francisco Ernesto Ruiz, Manny Lopez)

The 1993 Houston Astros season was the 32nd season for the Major League Baseball (MLB) franchise located in Houston, Texas, their 29th as the Astros, 32nd in the National League (NL), 25th in the NL West division, and 29th at The Astrodome, The Astros entered the season as having finished in fourth place in the NL West with an 81–81 record, 17 games behind the two-time defending division-champion and NL pennant-winning Atlanta Braves.

On April 5, pitcher Doug Drabek made his first Opening Day start for the Astros, who hosted the Philadelphia Phillies but were defeated, 3–1. The Astros' first-round draft pick in the amateur draft was pitcher Billy Wagner, at 12th overall.

Right-hander Darryl Kile represented the Astros at the MLB All-Star Game, his first career selection. On September 8, Kile tossed the ninth no-hitter in club history in a 7–1 triumph over the New York Mets. This was just the 14th non-shutout complete game no-hitter in the major leagues.

The Astros concluded the season with an 85–77 record, an improvement of six games from the season prior, in third place and 19 games behind first-place Atlanta, who repeated as division champions for a third consecutive season. They hosted above 2 million fans in attendance at the Astrodome for the first time since 1980 (2.084,618). This season was the start of the longest period of consistency of winning seasons for Houston, doing so in 14 of a span of 16 seasons through 2008, while claiming a playoff berth six times. It was also the start of an unprecedented seven consecutive winning seasons for the Astros, through the 1999 season.

This was the final of five seasons with Art Howe as manager, among other significant changes. It was also the final season that the Astros wore their "tequila sunrise" rainbow uniforms. As part of the league's playoff expansion by re-introducing the Division Series, it was the final time the Astros occupied the NL West division and would move to the newly-commissioned NL Central the following season.

== Offseason ==
- October 5, 1992: Denny Walling was released by the Astros.
- November 17, 1992: Butch Henry was drafted by the Colorado Rockies from the Houston Astros as the 36th pick in the 1992 MLB expansion draft.
- December 1, 1992: Doug Drabek was signed as a free agent by the Astros.
- December 4, 1992: Greg Swindell was signed as a free agent by the Astros.
- January 5, 1993: Jack Daugherty was signed as a free agent by the Astros.
- January 27, 1993: Signed right-handed pitcher Manuel Barrios as an international free agent.
- February 1, 1993: Jim Lindeman signed as a free agent by the Astros.

== Regular season ==
=== Summary ===
==== April—May ====
Opening Day starting lineup
Uniform	Player	Position
7	Craig Biggio	Second baseman
12	Steve Finley	Center fielder
5	Jeff Bagwell	First baseman
24	Eric Anthony	Right fielder
11	Ken Caminiti	Third baseman
26	Luis Gonzalez	Left fielder
17	Andújar Cedeño	Shortstop
6	Eddie Taubensee	Catcher
15	Doug Drabek	Pitcher
Venue: Astrodome • Final: Philadelphia 3, Houston 1 Sources:

For Opening Day, April 5, the Astros hosted the Philadelphia Phillies. Right-hander Doug Drabek made his first Opening Day start on the mound for Houston, while Philadelphia countered with southpaw Terry Mulholland. Drabek and Mulholland fabricated a pitchers' duel; however, Mulholland distinguished himself as the winner in a 3–1 Phillies' triumph. He surrendered just an unearned run in a four-hit complete game effort, while Drabek tossed eight frames, charged with two of the runs.

Astros starter Doug Drabek crushed the game-winning home run off reliever Pedro Martínez on May 16, a solo home run in the bottom of the seventh inning. He helped himself to his fourth win of the season as Houston prevailed over the Los Angeles Dodgers. Drabek stuck out nine and allowed both runs as earned on the way to tossing 7 2/3 solid innings.

For the month of May, Bagwell agglomerated a .412 batting average / .467 on-base percentage (OBP) / .676 slugging percentage (SLG) / 1.143 on-base plus slugging percentage (OPS). Over 27 games, he totaled 42 hits, 22 runs, 6 doubles, 7 home runs, 25 RBI and 69 total bases. Thus, he received NL Player of the Month honors, his first such honor. Bagwell succeeded Kevin Bass during June 1986 as the most recent Astro to win the award.

==== June ====
In the Astros' first-ever road trip to face the Colorado Rockies on June 12, they took a 7–0 lead only to wind up losing the game, 14–11.

On June 22, Jeff Bagwell homered, doubled, and singled, driving in two runs in a 5–1 victory over Los Angeles. He also scored twice, including stealing home. Meanwhile, each run the Astros scored was unearned.

For the month of June, right-hander Darryl Kile posted a 5–0 win–loss record (W–L), 1.15 earned run average (ERA), one complete game and 23 strikeouts. Kile won all five appearances (including four starts), surrendered 26 hits and 1.1.194 walks plus hits per inning pitched (WHIP). Hence, Kile was named NL Pitcher of the Month for the first time. Kile became the first Astro so recognized since Danny Darwin in July 1990.

==== July ====
Pitcher Darryl Kile tossed his first career shutout and belted his first home run on July 3, to lead the win over the St. Louis Cardinals and run his record to 9–1. By games' end, he had added to a 23 1/3 scoreless innings streak.

On July 10, the Astros approached history just a single away—both on pitching and offense. During the opening contest of a doubleheader at Wrigley Field, Pete Harnisch (8–6) delivered a no-hitter through 6 2/3 innings, while Luis Gonzalez came just a single short of hitting for the cycle. Harnisch discharged his first career one-hitter during a 4–0 victory over the Chicago Cubs. With 10 strikeouts and just three walks issued, this effort earned Harnisch a game score of 92. Harnisch's no-hit bid lasted until Mark Grace lined a single to center field with two outs in the bottom of the seventh. Meanwhile, Gonzalez, batting second, lined a double off Mike Harkey to right field to bring home Craig Biggio, who had led the contest off with a single. However, Sammy Sosa gunned down Gonzalez attempting to take third base. In the top of the third frame, Biggio was again aboard for Gonzalez, who hit a fly ball off Harkey to left field for a triple and drive in Biggio. In the top of the sixth, Biggio doubled to set the table for Gonzalez a third time, who homered off Harkey. In the top of the eighth, Shawn Boskie issued a walk to Gonzalez during his final opportunity to obtain the single. This was Gonzalez' fourth career 4-RBI effort.

During the July 10 night cap, Gonzalez drilled a José Guzmán offering to deep right in the top of the first to score Kevin Bass. Gonzalez was later issued two intentional base on balls, his first time receiving two or more during one game. Following Gonzalez' first-inning shot, the Astros maintained the extra-base hit momentum with six doubles and a triple by Biggio. Bass and Bagwell doubled twice to lead Houston to a twinbill sweep, 5–2.

Darryl Kile was selected to represented the Astros at the MLB All-Star Game for the first time, hosted in Oriole Park at Camden Yards in Baltimore, Maryland. Kile did not appear in the game. The American League defeated the National League, 9–3.

==== August ====
On August 31, Bagwell collected his sixth career four-hit game and his first with at least two stolen bases. Every Astros starter had at least one hit while the team piled on 18 and pasted the New York Mets, 10–2. Craig Biggio went deep and doubled twice, and Eddie Taubensee also homered. Harnisch (12–8) allowed three hits and two runs over seven frames.

==== Darryl Kile's no-hitter ====
Opposite the 39-year-old Frank Tanana, the 24-year-old Kile no-hit the New York Mets on September 8, leading a 7–1 Astros win. Third baseman Ken Caminiti hit his 12th home run in the bottom of the second inning. In the bottom of the fifth, shorstop Andújar Cedeño also hit a blast off Tanana for his seventh of the season. The ninth no-hitter in franchise history, this was Houston's sixth—and the final no-hitter ever—thrown at the Astrodome. (Note: The Astros relocated from the Astrodome following the 1999 season to Enron Field.)

In addition to providing the offense, Houston's left side of the infield contributed two spectacular defensive gems in the seventh inning. First, Caminiti dove to his left to snag a bullet off the bat of Mets first baseman Eddie Murray. In the next at bat, Cedeño's leaping dive—a game-saver like Caminiti's—deep into the hole to trap a shot from Joe Orsulak was equally astonishing. Cedeño's singular twirl-and-heave to Jeff Bagwell at first base nipped Orsulak prior to touching the bag.

Kile polished off the contest by whiffing pinch hitters Tito Navarro and Chico Walker consecutively. Kile improved to 15–6, while walking just one batter. His outing required just 83 pitches—getting 9 strikeouts.—and Kile retired each of the final 17 batters consecutively.

So rare in the manner this no-hitter was executed, that Kile became just 14th major league hurler to achieve a complete game no-hitter without the benefit of a shutout. The most recent had been by Joe Cowley for the Chicago White Sox in a 7–1 win over the California Angels on September 19, 1986, while Ervin Santana pitched the next for the Los Angleles Angels to lead a 3–1 triumph over the Cleveland Indians. Moreover, this was the third non-shutout, complete game no-hitter by the Houston Colt .45s/Astros franchise, a major league record. The first two no-hitters in franchise history were non-shutout complete games, spun by Don Nottebart on May 17, 1963, and by Ken Johnson on April 23, 1964. (Note: For single games, in complete games, in the regular season, requiring hits allowed = 0 and runs allowed ≥ 1 and innings pitched ≥ 9, sorted by ascending date.)

Following his no-hit effort, Kile was recognized as the NL Player of the Week for September 12. Kile's masterpiece succeeded Mike Scott's no-hit effort on September 25, 1986 (which succeeded Cowley's), as the previous by an Astro, and was succeeded by a six-man effort on June 11, 2003, composed of Roy Oswalt, Pete Munro, Kirk Saarloos, Brad Lidge, Octavio Dotel and Billy Wagner.

==== Rest of September ====
Pete Harnisch fired a one-hitter of the San Diego Padres on September 17 to lead a 3–0 Astros win. The lone hit for the Padres arrived via a bunt single by Jarvis Brown. However, controversy ensued as to whether the play should have been officially scored as an error charged to Chris Donnels. Donnels, meanwhile, atoned for the blemish with a two-run double to provide the offensive support. This was Harnisch's second one-hit shutout of the campaign and second of his career.

==== Performance overview and aftermath ====
The Astros concluded the 1993 interval with a final record of 85–77, in third place, and 19 games trailing the first-place Atlanta Braves. The seventh time in club history that Houston had won at least 85 games, it was 13th time finishing the complete season in third place or higher. (Note: The 1981 season was split into halves and the Astros' overall record ranked third-best in the NL West.) With an improvement by 4 wins, this was the second consecutive year that the Astros produced a record of .500 or better, and would continue to do so 15 times over a span of 17 seasons through 2008 to produce an era by far with the most consistency through that point in franchise history. Additionally, this Astros squad embarked on seven successive campaigns each with both a winning record and finish no lower than third place through 1999, both achievements ultimately arranging club records. The Astros hosted over 2 million fans in attendance for the first time since 1980 (2.084,618), the third time in team history drawing 2 million or more (1965), and third-highest overall to date.

Moreover, the 85 victories represented the most Astros had won during a non-playoff qualifying campaign, since they collected 89 wins each in 1979 and 1989, and was their second-best tally since winning a then-club record 96 during their NL West division title drive in 1986. With a run differential of +86, the Astros' Pythagorean expectation model computed to a record of 90–72 (.556).

This Astros squad established then-club records, including a .267 batting average, to break the .264 mark by the 1984 team, .739 OPS (.722 in 1970), and 138 home runs (134 each in 1972 and 1973). These records stood until they batted .278 and .792 OPS the following season, and launched 166 home runs in 1998. Seven hitters logged 10 or more home runs to establish a club record, surpassing six each by the 1977 and 1987 teams. (Note: Surpassed by the 2000 team. Criteria: Number of players that meet criteria in a season, up to 2001, playing for HOU, in the regular season, requiring home runs ≥ 10, sorted by descending instances.)

Pete Harnisch, who tossed two one-hit shutouts, individually led the National League in complete games of one hit or fewer, tied with Mike Moore of the Detroit Tigers for the Major League lead. Combined with Kile's no-hitter, the Astros' pitching staff tied the Cincinnati Reds with three one-hit or fewer complete games for the Major League lead. (Note: Number of games in a season player meets criteria, in 1993, in complete games, in the regular season, requiring hits allowed ≤ 1, sorted by descending instances.) Harnish also led the NL in hits per nine innings surrendered (7.070 H/9). It was the right-hander's second time in three seasons (also 1991) as a member of Houston's staff. Over a 23-season span commencing with Don Wilson in 1971, this was the 11th occasion in club history a Houston pitcher had led the league. Harnisch joined Nolan Ryan (4 times, most recently as 1987) and J. R. Richard (3) as Astros who had led the league multiple times.

Right-hander Xavier Hernandez became the second relief pitcher to garner 100 or more strikeouts for Houston, whiffing 101 over 96 2/3 innings pitched (IP) over 72 games, along with a 2.66 ERA, 4–5 record, nine saves, and 1.066 walks plus hits per inning pitched (WHIP). Hernandez succeeded Danny Darwin in 1989 in attaining 100 or more strikeouts. (Note: For single seasons up to 2001, at least 80% games in relief, playing for HOU, in the regular season, requiring strikeouts ≥ 100, sorted by ascending seasons.)

Conversely, the 1993 campaigned signified the end of other eras. Concurrent with Major League Baseball's second round of playoff expansion since 1969, the league commissioned one new Central division each for both the American and National leagues beginning the following season. Hence, the Astros and Reds—among 10 teams reshuffled—would no longer occupy the NL West and instead assumed position as charter members of the NL Central division starting in 1994. The league's expansion further included reintroduction of the Division Series—previously held as a one-time event during the 1981 playoffs—and the installation of the Wild Card playoff qualifier for each league. Second, locally for the Astros, manager Art Howe was fired and replaced by Terry Collins for the next season.

=== Season standings ===
==== National League West ====
NL West
Team	W	L	Pct.	GB	Home	Road
Atlanta Braves	104	58	.642	—	51‍–‍30	53‍–‍28
San Francisco Giants	103	59	.636	1	50‍–‍31	53‍–‍28
Houston Astros	85	77	.525	19	44‍–‍37	41‍–‍40
Los Angeles Dodgers	81	81	.500	23	41‍–‍40	40‍–‍41
Cincinnati Reds	73	89	.451	31	41‍–‍40	32‍–‍49
Colorado Rockies	67	95	.414	37	39‍–‍42	28‍–‍53
San Diego Padres	61	101	.377	43	34‍–‍47	27‍–‍54

==== Record versus opponents ====
National League

1993 National League record Source: MLB Standings Grid – 1993
Team	ATL	CHC	CIN	COL	FLA	HOU	LAD	MON	NYM	PHI	PIT	SD	SF	STL
Atlanta	—	7–5	10–3	13–0	7–5	8–5	8–5	7–5	9–3	6–6	7–5	9–4	7–6	6–6
Chicago	5–7	—	7–5	8–4	6–7	4–8	7–5	5–8–1	8–5	7–6	5–8	8–4	6–6	8–5
Cincinnati	3–10	5–7	—	9–4	7–5	6–7	5–8	4–8	6–6	4–8	8–4	9–4	2–11	5–7
Colorado	0–13	4–8	4–9	—	7–5	11–2	7–6	3–9	6–6	3–9	8–4	6–7	3–10	5–7
Florida	5–7	7–6	5–7	5–7	—	3–9	5–7	5–8	4–9	4–9	6–7	7–5	4–8	4–9
Houston	5–8	8–4	7–6	2–11	9–3	—	9–4	5–7	11–1	5–7	7–5	8–5	3–10	6–6
Los Angeles	5–8	5–7	8–5	6–7	7–5	4–9	—	6–6	8–4	2–10	8–4	9–4	7–6	6–6
Montreal	5–7	8–5–1	8–4	9–3	8–5	7–5	6–6	—	9–4	6–7	8–5	10–2	3–9	7–6
New York	3–9	5–8	6–6	6–6	9–4	1–11	4–8	4–9	—	3–10	4–9	5–7	4–8	5–8
Philadelphia	6-6	6–7	8–4	9–3	9–4	7–5	10–2	7–6	10–3	—	7–6	6–6	4–8	8–5
Pittsburgh	5–7	8–5	4–8	4–8	7–6	5–7	4–8	5–8	9–4	6–7	—	9–3	5–7	4–9
San Diego	4–9	4–8	4–9	7–6	5–7	5–8	4–9	2–10	7–5	6–6	3–9	—	3–10	7–5
San Francisco	6–7	6–6	11–2	10–3	8–4	10–3	6–7	9–3	8–4	8–4	7–5	10–3	—	4–8
St. Louis	6–6	5–8	7–5	7–5	9–4	6–6	6–6	6–7	8–5	5–8	9–4	5–7	8–4	—

=== Notable transactions ===
- July 12, 1993: Jack Daugherty was traded by the Astros to the Cincinnati Reds for Steve Carter.

=== Roster ===
1993 Houston Astros
Roster
Pitchers: 49 Juan Agosto; 54 Eric Bell; 15 Doug Drabek; 46 Tom Edens; 47 Mark Grant; 27 Pete Harnisch; 31 Xavier Hernandez; 23 Doug Jones; 59 Todd Jones; 44 Jeff Juden; 57 Darryl Kile; 29 Al Osuna; 51 Mark Portugal; 38 Shane Reynolds; 21 Greg Swindell; 53 Brian Williams	Catchers: 9 Scott Servais; 6 Eddie Taubensee; 36 Eddie Tucker; Infielders: 5 Jeff Bagwell; 7 Craig Biggio; 4 Mike Brumley; 11 Ken Caminiti; 1 Casey Candaele; 17 Andújar Cedeño; 22 Jack Daugherty; 3 Chris Donnels; 19 Jim Lindeman; 28 José Uribe	Outfielders: 24 Eric Anthony; 17 Kevin Bass; 12 Steve Finley; 26 Luis Gonzalez; 16 Chris James; 30 Rick Parker; 4 Karl Rhodes	Manager: 18 Art Howe; Coaches: 54 Bob Cluck (pitching); 48 Matt Galante (third base); 42 Rudy Jaramillo (hitting); 14 Ed Ott (bench); 52 Tom Spencer (first base)

== Player stats ==
=== Batting ===
==== Starters by position ====
Note: Pos = Position; G = Games played; AB = At bats; H = Hits; Avg. = Batting average; HR = Home runs; RBI = Runs batted in

Pos	Player	G	AB	H	Avg.	HR	RBI
C	Eddie Taubensee	94	288	72	.250	9	42
1B	Jeff Bagwell	142	535	171	.320	20	88
2B	Craig Biggio	155	610	175	.287	21	64
3B	Ken Caminiti	143	543	142	.262	13	75
SS	Andújar Cedeño	149	505	143	.283	11	56
LF	Luis Gonzalez	154	540	162	.300	15	72
CF	Steve Finley	142	545	145	.266	8	44
RF	Eric Anthony	145	486	121	.249	15	66

==== Other batters ====
Note: G = Games played; AB = At bats; H = Hits; Avg. = Batting average; HR = Home runs; RBI = Runs batted in

Player	G	AB	H	Avg.	HR	RBI
Scott Servais	85	258	63	.244	11	32
Kevin Bass	111	229	65	.284	3	37
Chris Donnels	88	179	46	.257	2	24
Chris James	65	129	33	.256	6	19
Casey Candaele	75	121	29	.240	1	7
José Uribe	45	53	13	.245	0	3
Rick Parker	45	45	15	.333	0	4
Eddie Tucker	9	26	5	.192	0	3
Jim Lindeman	9	23	8	.348	0	0
Mike Brumley	8	10	3	.300	0	2
Jack Daugherty	4	3	1	.333	0	0
Tuffy Rhodes	5	2	0	.000	0	0

=== Pitching ===
==== Starting pitchers ====
Note: G = Games pitched; IP = Innings pitched; W = Wins; L = Losses; ERA = Earned run average; SO = Strikeouts

Player	G	IP	W	L	ERA	SO
Doug Drabek	34	237.2	9	18	3.79	157
Pete Harnisch	33	217.2	16	9	2.98	185
Mark Portugal	33	208.0	18	4	2.77	131
Greg Swindell	31	190.1	12	13	4.16	124
Darryl Kile	32	171.2	15	8	3.51	141

==== Other pitchers ====
Note: G = Games pitched; IP = Innings pitched; W = Wins; L = Losses; ERA = Earned run average; SO = Strikeouts

Player	G	IP	W	L	ERA	SO
Shane Reynolds	5	11.0	0	0	0.82	10

==== Relief pitchers ====
Note: G = Games pitched; W = Wins; L = Losses; SV = Saves; ERA = Earned run average; SO = Strikeouts

Player	G	W	L	SV	ERA	SO
Doug Jones	71	4	10	26	4.54	66
Xavier Hernandez	72	4	5	9	2.61	101
Al Osuna	44	1	1	2	3.20	21
Brian Williams	42	4	4	3	4.83	56
Tom Edens	38	1	1	0	3.12	21
Todd Jones	27	1	2	2	3.13	25
Eric Bell	10	0	1	0	6.14	2
Mark Grant	6	0	0	0	0.82	6
Juan Agosto	6	0	0	0	6.00	3
Jeff Juden	2	0	1	0	5.40	7

== Major League Baseball draft ==
Houston Astros 1993 MLB draft selections
Rd.	Slot	Draftee	Position	School	Origin	Signed	Notes	Bio
1	12	Billy Wagner	Left-handed pitcher	Ferrum	(Virginia)	Y	(Note: MLB debut on September 13, 1995, with Houston)	
2	None						(Note: Pick assigned to Pittsburgh Pirates as compensation for signing of free agent Doug Drabek.)	
3	None						(Note: Pick assigned to Cincinnati Reds as compensation for signing of free agent Greg Swindell.)	
4	112	Steve Verduzco	Shortstop	Bellarmine College Prep	(California)	Y		
5	140	Derek Root	First baseman	St. Edward High	(Ohio)	Y		
6	168	Jamie Saylor	Shortstop	North Garland HS	(Ohio)	Y		
7	196	Jaime Bluma	Right-handed pitcher	Wichita State • 1993	(South Carolina)	N	(Note: Signed with the Kansas City Royals from the 1994 draft.) (Note: MLB debut on August 9, 1996, with Kansas City)	
8	224	Mike Diorio	Right-handed pitcher	Seward County CC	(Colorado)	Y		

== Awards and achievements ==
=== No-hit game ===
Date	Pitcher	IP	BB	BR	K	BF	Catcher	Final	Opponent	Venue	Plate umpire	Box
September 8, 1993	Darryl Kile	9	1	1	9	28	Scott Servais	7–1	New York Mets	Astrodome	Ed Montague	
September 8, 1993	Kile: Game score: 93 • Win (15–6)											

=== Awards ===
1993 Houston Astros award winners
Name of award		Recipient	Ref.
Fred Hartman Award for Long and Meritorious Service to Baseball		Tal Smith	
Houston-Area Major League Player of the Year	SEA	Jay Buhner	
Houston Astros Most Valuable Player (MVP)		Jeff Bagwell	
MLB All-Star Game	Reserve pitcher	Darryl Kile	
National League (NL) Pitcher of the Month	June	Darryl Kile	
National League (NL) Player of the Month	May	Jeff Bagwell	
National League (NL) Player of the Week	May 23	Jeff Bagwell	
National League (NL) Player of the Week	September 12	Darryl Kile	

Other awards results

Name of award	Voting recipient(s) (Team)	Ref.
NL Cy Young Award	1st—Maddux (ATL) • 6th—Portugal (HOU)	
NL Most Valuable Player	1st—Bonds (SFG) • 20th—Bagwell (HOU)	

=== League leaders ===
NL batting leaders

- Sacrifice flies; Luis Gonazalez (10)
- Triples: Steve Finley (13)

NL pitching leaders

- Hit batters: Darryl Kile (15)
- Hits per nine innings pitched (H/9): Pete Harnisch (7.07)
- Losses: Doug Drabek (18)
- Shutouts: Pete Harnisch (4)
- Winning percentage: Mark Portugal (.818)

=== Other ===
1993 grand slams
No.	Date	Astros batter	Venue	Inning	Pitcher	Opposing team	Box
None (Note: The Astros' first season without a grand slam since 1990)

== Minor league system ==
Level	Team	League	Manager
AAA	Tucson Toros	Pacific Coast League	Rick Sweet
AA	Jackson Generals	Texas League	Sal Butera
A	Osceola Astros	Florida State League	Tim Tolman
A	Quad Cities River Bandits	Midwest League	Steve Dillard
A	Asheville Tourists	South Atlantic League	Bobby Ramos
A-Short Season	Auburn Astros	New York–Penn League	Manny Acta
Rookie	GCL Astros	Gulf Coast League	Julio Linares

Championships

- Pacific Coast League champions: Tucson
- Texas League champions: Jackson

Awards

- Pacific Coast League Most Valuable Player (PCL MVP): James Mouton
- Texas League Most Valuable Player Award (TL MVP): Roberto Petagine, 1B
- Triple-A All-Star Team—Second baseman: James Mouton

== See also ==
- List of Major League Baseball annual shutout leaders
- List of Major League Baseball annual triples leaders
- List of Major League Baseball no-hitters
