= Doug Saunders (baseball) =

American baseball player (born 1969)

- Infielder
- Born: December 13, 1969 (age 56); Yorba Linda, California
- Batted: Right Threw: Right

MLB debut
- June 13, 1993, for the New York Mets

Last MLB appearance
- October 3, 1993, for the New York Mets

MLB statistics
- Batting average: .209
- Hits: 14
- Runs batted in: 0
- Stats at Baseball Reference

Teams
- New York Mets (1993)

Douglas Long Saunders (born December 13, 1969) is an American former professional baseball player. Saunders played for the New York Mets of Major League Baseball (MLB) in the 1993 season. In 28 games, Saunders had 14 hits in 67 at-bats, with a .209 batting average. He has 4 brothers, Dennis, Eric, Barry and Keith.
