= 1993 Cincinnati Reds season =

1993 Cincinnati Reds
- League: National League
- Division: West
- Ballpark: Riverfront Stadium
- City: Cincinnati
- Record: 73–89 (.451)
- Divisional place: 5th
- Owners: Marge Schott
- General managers: Jim Bowden
- Managers: Tony Pérez, Davey Johnson
- Television: WLWT (Marty Brennaman, George Grande, Chris Welsh); SportsChannel Cincinnati (Gordy Coleman, George Grande)
- Radio: WLW (Marty Brennaman, Joe Nuxhall)

The 1993 Cincinnati Reds season was the 124th season for the franchise in Major League Baseball, their 24th and 23rd full season at Riverfront Stadium and the team's last as members of the National League West. The Reds failed to improve on their record of 90–72 from 1992 and finished in fifth place in 1993, with a 73–89 record. The team introduced new uniforms, being the last in MLB to abandon the 1970s/80s pullover jersey/beltless pants combo; the new look reintroduced sleeveless vests and a pinstriped cap; this look would hold until 1998.

Major League Baseball's executive council decided to prevent owner Marge Schott from exercising day-to-day oversight of the Reds during the 1993 season, while still leaving major financial decisions to her. This was a response to several November 1992 accounts of Schott racially and ethnically slurring players and business associates, and praising the early efforts of Adolf Hitler.

== Offseason ==
- November 3, 1992: Paul O'Neill and Joe DeBerry (minors) were traded by the Reds to the New York Yankees for Roberto Kelly.
- November 6, 1992: Greg Cadaret was purchased by the Reds from the New York Yankees.
- November 17, 1992: Norm Charlton was traded by the Reds to the Seattle Mariners for Kevin Mitchell.
- November 18, 1992: Scott Coolbaugh was released by the Reds.
- November 25, 1992: Gary Varsho was selected off waivers by the Reds from the Pittsburgh Pirates.
- December 1, 1992: John Smiley was signed as a free agent by the Reds.
- December 7, 1992: Willie Cañate was drafted by the Reds from the Cleveland Indians in the 1992 rule 5 draft.
- December 10, 1992: Troy Afenir was signed as a free agent by the Reds.
- December 10, 1992: Jeff Kaiser was signed as a free agent by the Reds.
- December 11, 1992: Juan Samuel was signed as a free agent by the Reds.
- January 13, 1993: Bill Doran was purchased from the Reds by the Milwaukee Brewers.
- January 19, 1993: Jeff Reardon was signed as a free agent by the Reds.
- January 22, 1993: Jamie Quirk was signed as a free agent by the Reds.
- February 1, 1993: Randy Milligan was signed as a free agent by the Reds.
- Before 1993 season: Steve Carter was acquired by the Reds from the Detroit Tigers.

== Regular season ==
=== Season standings ===
NL West
Team	W	L	Pct.	GB	Home	Road
Atlanta Braves	104	58	.642	—	51‍–‍30	53‍–‍28
San Francisco Giants	103	59	.636	1	50‍–‍31	53‍–‍28
Houston Astros	85	77	.525	19	44‍–‍37	41‍–‍40
Los Angeles Dodgers	81	81	.500	23	41‍–‍40	40‍–‍41
Cincinnati Reds	73	89	.451	31	41‍–‍40	32‍–‍49
Colorado Rockies	67	95	.414	37	39‍–‍42	28‍–‍53
San Diego Padres	61	101	.377	43	34‍–‍47	27‍–‍54

=== Record vs. opponents ===
1993 National League record Source: MLB Standings Grid – 1993
Team	ATL	CHC	CIN	COL	FLA	HOU	LAD	MON	NYM	PHI	PIT	SD	SF	STL
Atlanta	—	7–5	10–3	13–0	7–5	8–5	8–5	7–5	9–3	6–6	7–5	9–4	7–6	6–6
Chicago	5–7	—	7–5	8–4	6–7	4–8	7–5	5–8–1	8–5	7–6	5–8	8–4	6–6	8–5
Cincinnati	3–10	5–7	—	9–4	7–5	6–7	5–8	4–8	6–6	4–8	8–4	9–4	2–11	5–7
Colorado	0–13	4–8	4–9	—	7–5	11–2	7–6	3–9	6–6	3–9	8–4	6–7	3–10	5–7
Florida	5–7	7–6	5–7	5–7	—	3–9	5–7	5–8	4–9	4–9	6–7	7–5	4–8	4–9
Houston	5–8	8–4	7–6	2–11	9–3	—	9–4	5–7	11–1	5–7	7–5	8–5	3–10	6–6
Los Angeles	5–8	5–7	8–5	6–7	7–5	4–9	—	6–6	8–4	2–10	8–4	9–4	7–6	6–6
Montreal	5–7	8–5–1	8–4	9–3	8–5	7–5	6–6	—	9–4	6–7	8–5	10–2	3–9	7–6
New York	3–9	5–8	6–6	6–6	9–4	1–11	4–8	4–9	—	3–10	4–9	5–7	4–8	5–8
Philadelphia	6-6	6–7	8–4	9–3	9–4	7–5	10–2	7–6	10–3	—	7–6	6–6	4–8	8–5
Pittsburgh	5–7	8–5	4–8	4–8	7–6	5–7	4–8	5–8	9–4	6–7	—	9–3	5–7	4–9
San Diego	4–9	4–8	4–9	7–6	5–7	5–8	4–9	2–10	7–5	6–6	3–9	—	3–10	7–5
San Francisco	6–7	6–6	11–2	10–3	8–4	10–3	6–7	9–3	8–4	8–4	7–5	10–3	—	4–8
St. Louis	6–6	5–8	7–5	7–5	9–4	6–6	6–6	6–7	8–5	5–8	9–4	5–7	8–4	—

=== Notable transactions ===
- April 13, 1993: Willie Cañate was purchased from the Reds by the Toronto Blue Jays.
- April 23, 1993: Jeff Kaiser was selected off waivers from the Reds by the New York Mets.
- June 28, 1993: Scott Service was selected off waivers from the Reds by the Colorado Rockies.
- July 7, 1993: Scott Service was selected off waivers by the Reds from the Colorado Rockies.
- July 12, 1991: Steve Carter was traded by the Reds to the Houston Astros for Jack Daugherty.
- July 26, 1993: Greg Cadaret was released by the Reds.
- July 31, 1993: Tim Belcher was traded by the Reds to the Chicago White Sox for Johnny Ruffin and Jeff Pierce.
- August 17, 1993: Randy Milligan was traded by the Reds to the Cleveland Indians for Thomas Howard.

=== Roster ===
1993 Cincinnati Reds
Roster
Pitchers: 56 Mike Anderson; 59 Bobby Ayala; 31 Tim Belcher; 32 Tom Browning; 61 Chris Bushing; 25 Greg Cadaret; 49 Rob Dibble; 54 Steve Foster; 48 Dwayne Henry; 39 Milt Hill; 56 Jeff Kaiser; 43 Bill Landrum; 52 Larry Luebbers; 55 Ross Powell; 40 Tim Pugh; 41 Jeff Reardon; 27 José Rijo; 44 John Roper; 58 Johnny Ruffin; 28 Scott Ruskin; 34 Scott Service; 57 John Smiley; 48 Jerry Spradlin; 45 Kevin Wickander	Catchers: 33 Brian Dorsett; 9 Joe Oliver; 6 Dan Wilson; Infielders: 20 Jeff Branson; 12 Willie Greene; 62 Keith Kessinger; 60 Brian Koelling; 11 Barry Larkin; 19 Randy Milligan; 23 Hal Morris; 10 Bip Roberts; 17 Chris Sabo; 8 Juan Samuel	Outfielders: 46 Jacob Brumfield; 18 Tim Costo; 21 Jack Daugherty; 22 Cecil Espy; 50 Keith Gordon; 26 Tommy Gregg; 58 César Hernández; 22 Thomas Howard; 45 Keith Hughes; 30 Roberto Kelly; 7 Kevin Mitchell; 16 Reggie Sanders; 51 Greg Tubbs; 42 Gary Varsho	Manager: 15 Davey Johnson; 24 Tony Pérez; Coaches: 4 Dave Bristol (third base/hitting) (through May 23); 35 Don Gullett (pitching); 2 Dave Miley (bench); 3 Ron Oester (first base) (through May 23); 37 Larry Rothschild (bullpen) (through May 23); 3 Bobby Valentine (third base) (May 23 – end of season); 4 Ray Knight (hitting) (May 23 – end of season); 00 José Cardenal (first base/outfield) (first base coach from May 23 – end of season)

== Player stats ==
= Indicates team leader

=== Batting ===
==== Starters by position ====
Note: Pos = Position; G = Games played; AB = At bats; H = Hits; Avg. = Batting average; HR = Home runs; RBI = Runs batted in

Pos	Player	G	AB	H	Avg.	HR	RBI
C	Joe Oliver	139	482	115	.239	14	75
1B	Hal Morris	101	379	120	.317	7	49
2B	Juan Samuel	103	261	60	.230	4	26
SS	Barry Larkin	100	384	121	.315	8	51
3B	Chris Sabo	148	552	143	.259	21	82
LF	Kevin Mitchell	93	323	110	.341	19	64
CF	Roberto Kelly	78	320	102	.319	9	35
RF	Reggie Sanders	138	496	136	.274	20	83

==== Other batters ====
Note: G = Games played; AB = At bats; H = Hits; Avg. = Batting average; HR = Home runs; RBI = Runs batted in

Player	G	AB	H	Avg.	HR	RBI
Jeff Branson	125	381	92	.241	3	22
Bip Roberts	83	292	70	.240	1	18
Jacob Brumfield	103	272	73	.268	6	23
Randy Milligan	83	234	64	.274	6	29
Thomas Howard	38	141	39	.277	4	13
Tim Costo	31	98	22	.224	3	12
Gary Varsho	77	95	22	.232	2	11
Dan Wilson	36	76	17	.224	0	8
Brian Dorsett	25	63	16	.254	2	12
Cecil Espy	40	60	14	.233	0	5
Jack Daugherty	46	59	13	.220	2	9
Greg Tubbs	35	59	11	.186	1	2
Willie Greene	15	50	8	.160	2	5
Keith Kessinger	11	27	7	.259	1	3
César Hernández	27	24	2	.083	0	1
Brian Koelling	7	15	1	.067	0	0
Tommy Gregg	10	12	2	.167	0	0
Keith Gordon	3	6	1	.167	0	0
Keith Hughes	3	4	0	.000	0	0

=== Pitching ===
= Indicates league leader

==== Starting pitchers ====
Note: G = Games pitched; IP = Innings pitched; W = Wins; L = Losses; ERA = Earned run average; SO = Strikeouts

Player	G	IP	W	L	ERA	SO
José Rijo	36	257.1	14	9	2.48	227
Tim Pugh	31	164.1	10	15	5.26	94
Tim Belcher	22	137.0	9	6	4.47	101
Tom Browning	21	114.0	7	7	4.74	53
John Smiley	18	105.2	3	9	5.62	60
John Roper	16	80.0	2	5	5.63	54
Larry Luebbers	14	77.1	2	5	4.54	38

==== Other pitchers ====
Note: G = Games pitched; IP = Innings pitched; W = Wins; L = Losses; ERA = Earned run average; SO = Strikeouts

Player	G	IP	W	L	ERA	SO
Bobby Ayala	43	98.0	7	10	5.60	65

==== Relief pitchers ====
Note: G = Games pitched; W = Wins; L = Losses; SV = Saves; ERA = Earned run average; SO = Strikeouts

Player	G	W	L	SV	ERA	SO
Rob Dibble	45	1	4	19	6.48	49
Jeff Reardon	58	4	6	8	4.09	35
Jerry Spradlin	37	2	1	2	3.49	24
Greg Cadaret	34	2	1	1	4.96	23
Kevin Wickander	33	1	0	0	6.75	20
Scott Service	26	2	2	2	3.70	40
Johnny Ruffin	21	2	1	2	3.58	30
Milt Hill	19	3	0	0	5.65	23
Bill Landrum	18	0	2	0	3.74	14
Steve Foster	17	2	2	0	1.75	16
Ross Powell	9	0	3	0	4.41	17
Chris Bushing	6	0	0	0	12.46	3
Scott Ruskin	4	0	0	0	18.00	0
Mike Anderson	3	0	0	0	18.56	4
Dwayne Henry	3	0	1	0	3.86	2
Jeff Kaiser	3	0	0	0	2.70	4

== Awards and honors ==
- Barry Larkin, Shortstop, Roberto Clemente Award

All-Star Game

- Barry Larkin, Starter
- Roberto Kelly, Reserve

== Farm system ==
Level	Team	League	Manager
AAA	Indianapolis Indians	American Association	Marc Bombard
AA	Chattanooga Lookouts	Southern League	Pat Kelly
A	Winston-Salem Spirits	Carolina League	Mark Berry
A	Charleston Wheelers	South Atlantic League	Tom Nieto
Rookie	Princeton Reds	Appalachian League	Tom Dunbar
Rookie	Billings Mustangs	Pioneer League	Donnie Scott

LEAGUE CHAMPIONS: Winston-Salem, Billings
