= Mike Draper =

American baseball player (born 1966)

- Pitcher
- Born: September 14, 1966 (age 59); Hagerstown, Maryland
- Batted: Right Threw: Right

MLB debut
- April 10, 1993, for the New York Mets

Last MLB appearance
- August 7, 1993, for the New York Mets

MLB statistics
- Win–loss record: 1–1
- Earned run average: 4.25
- Strikeouts: 16
- Stats at Baseball Reference

Teams
- New York Mets (1993)

Michael Anthony Draper (born September 14, 1966) is an American former pitcher in Major League Baseball who played for the New York Mets during the 1993 season. Listed at 6' 2", 180 lb., Draper batted and threw right-handed. He was born in Hagerstown, Maryland.

== Sources ==
- Career statistics from Baseball Reference · Baseball Reference (Minors) · Retrosheet · Baseball Almanac, or Retrosheet
