= Rich Batchelor =

American baseball player (born 1967)

- Pitcher
- Born: April 8, 1967 (age 59); Florence, South Carolina, U.S.
- Batted: Right Threw: Right

MLB debut
- September 3, 1993, for the St. Louis Cardinals

Last MLB appearance
- July 15, 1997, for the San Diego Padres

MLB statistics
- Win–loss record: 5–1
- Earned run average: 5.03
- Strikeouts: 33

NPB statistics
- Win–loss record: 0–0
- Earned run average: 7.94
- Strikeouts: 2
- Stats at Baseball Reference

Teams
- St. Louis Cardinals (1993, 1996–1997); San Diego Padres (1997); Yakult Swallows (1999)

Richard Anthony Batchelor (born April 8, 1967), is an American former professional baseball relief pitcher. He played in Major League Baseball (MLB) for the St. Louis Cardinals and San Diego Padres between 1993 and 1997. He also played in Nippon Professional Baseball (NPB) for the Yakult Swallows in 1999.

== Career ==
Born in Florence, South Carolina, Batchelor played college baseball for the USC Aiken Pacers of his home state. Initially drafted by the Chicago White Sox in the 1988 MLB draft, he did not sign with the team. He was later selected by the New York Yankees in the 1989 MLB draft, and signed with them.

Batchelor began his professional career in 1990, with the Single–A Greensboro Hornets. He advanced through the Yankees' farm system, first reaching the Triple–A level in 1993 with the Columbus Clippers. That season, at the end of August, Batchelor was traded to the St. Louis Cardinals for reliever Lee Smith.

Batchelor made his MLB debut with the Cardinals on September 3, 1993. He pitched in nine games with the team through the end of the season, striking out four batters in 10 innings pitched while compiling an 8.10 earned run average (ERA).

During the 1994 and 1995 seasons, Batchelor pitched exclusively for the Louisville Redbirds, the Cardinals' Triple–A affiliate. He returned to the Redbirds in 1996, while also appearing in 11 games with St. Louis, registering a 1.20 ERA while striking out 11 batters in 15 innings of major-league pitching. Batchelor initially split time in 1997 between Louisville and St. Louis, including 10 games for the Cardinals with a 4.50 ERA. In mid-June, Batchelor was part of a multi-player trade that sent him to the San Diego Padres.

Batchelor spent the remainder of the 1997 season with the Padres and their Triple–A farm team, the Las Vegas Stars. With the Padres, he appeared in 13 games with a 7.82 ERA. Overall in MLB during 1997, Batchelor struck out 18 batters in 28 2/3 innings, and had a combined 5.97 ERA. After the season, he was released by the Padres and signed with the Cleveland Indians. He spent the 1998 season with the Indians' Triple-A team, the Buffalo Bisons.

In 1999, Batchelor played for Triple–A Tucson Sidewinders, an affiliate of the Arizona Diamondbacks, and the Yakult Swallows of Nippon Professional Baseball (NPB). He had a 7.94 ERA with the Swallows, appearing in seven games. Batchelor's final professional season was 2000, when he played eight games for the Yankees' Class A-Advanced farm team, the Tampa Yankees, recording a 5.87 ERA.

Overall, Batchelor played in 43 MLB games, recording a 5–1 win–loss record with 5.03 ERA, and 463 minor league games, recording a 30–38 record with 3.44 ERA.
