= Rod Brewer =

American baseball player (born 1966)

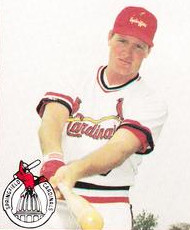
- Brewer in 1988
- First baseman / Outfielder
- Born: February 24, 1966 (age 59); Eustis, Florida, U.S.
- Batted: Left Threw: Left

MLB debut
- September 5, 1990, for the St. Louis Cardinals

Last MLB appearance
- October 3, 1993, for the St. Louis Cardinals

MLB statistics
- Batting average: .278
- Home runs: 2
- Runs batted in: 33

NPB statistics
- Batting average: .232
- Home runs: 8
- Runs batted in: 31
- Stats at Baseball Reference

Teams
- St. Louis Cardinals (1990–1993); Seibu Lions (1994)

Rodney Lee Brewer (born February 24, 1966) is an American former college and professional baseball player who was a first baseman and outfielder for the St. Louis Cardinals of Major League Baseball (MLB) from 1990 to 1993.

Brewer was born in Eustis, Florida. He attended Apopka High School in Apopka, Florida, and played for the Apopka Blue Darters high school baseball team.

Brewer attended the University of Florida in Gainesville, Florida, where he played for coach Joe Arnold's Florida Gators baseball team from 1985 to 1987. In 1986, he played collegiate summer baseball with the Hyannis Mets of the Cape Cod Baseball League.

The St. Louis Cardinals selected Brewer in the fifth round of the 1987 MLB draft.

== See also ==
- Florida Gators
- List of Florida Gators baseball players
