= John DeSilva =

American baseball player (born 1967)

- Pitcher
- Born: September 30, 1967 (age 58); Fort Bragg, California, U.S.
- Batted: Right Threw: Right

MLB debut
- August 15, 1993, for the Detroit Tigers

Last MLB appearance
- July 2, 1995, for the Baltimore Orioles

MLB statistics
- Win–loss record: 1–0
- Earned run average: 7.20
- Strikeouts: 7
- Stats at Baseball Reference

Teams
- Detroit Tigers (1993); Los Angeles Dodgers (1993); Baltimore Orioles (1995)

John Reed DeSilva (born September 30, 1967) is an American former right-handed pitcher in Major League Baseball who played in six games (two starts) for the Detroit Tigers, Los Angeles Dodgers and Baltimore Orioles during the 1993 and 1995 baseball seasons.

== Fact ==
In between, DeSilva played winter ball with the Leones del Caracas, Águilas del Zulia and Tiburones de La Guaira clubs of the Venezuelan League during six seasons spanning 1993–2004. He posted a 16–8 record and a 3.23 ERA in 43 pitching appearances, including 30 starts and three complete games, striking out 143 batters while walking 59 in 181.0 innings of work. Nowadays, DeSilva is well remembered in Venezuelan baseball history.
