= Steve Dixon (baseball) =

American baseball player (born 1969)

- Pitcher
- Born: August 3, 1969 (age 56); Cincinnati, Ohio, U.S.
- Batted: Left Threw: Left

MLB debut
- September 7, 1993, for the St. Louis Cardinals

Last MLB appearance
- July 18, 1994, for the St. Louis Cardinals

MLB statistics
- Win–loss record: 0–0
- Earned run average: 28.80
- Strikeouts: 3
- Stats at Baseball Reference

Teams
- St. Louis Cardinals (1993–1994)

Steven Ross Dixon (born August 3, 1969) is an American former Major League Baseball pitcher. Dixon played for the St. Louis Cardinals in 1993 and 1994.
