= Lonnie Maclin =

American baseball player (born 1967)

- Left fielder
- Born: February 17, 1967 (age 59); Clayton, Missouri, U.S.
- Batted: Left Threw: Left

MLB debut
- September 7, 1993, for the St. Louis Cardinals

Last MLB appearance
- October 3, 1993, for the St. Louis Cardinals

MLB statistics
- Games: 12
- At bats: 13
- Hits: 1
- Stats at Baseball Reference

Teams
- St. Louis Cardinals (1993)

Lonnie Lee Maclin (born February 17, 1967) is an American former Major League Baseball left fielder. Maclin played for the St. Louis Cardinals in the 1993 season. In 12 career games, Maclin had one hit in 13 at-bats. He batted and threw left-handed.

== Career ==
Maclin attended Ritenour High School of St. Louis, where at various times he played baseball, basketball, and football, wrestled, and ran track. He was drafted by the Cardinals in the 3rd round of the 1986 amateur draft.

Maclin attributes his failure to catch on with the Cardinals in part to an organizational preference for power hitters, when he was a self-described "slap hitter."

In July 1995, the Rio Grande Valley White Wings traded Maclin to the Amarillo Dillas in exchange for third baseman Mike Fernandez. Maclin would go on to play for the Dillas in every season though 2001. He served as player-manager in 2001, and served as manager only the following season. The Amarillo Globe-News, the paper of record for the city, described him as "one of the all-time great Dillas players".

In his free time, Maclin enjoyed performing stand-up comedy.
