= 1993 Chicago Cubs season =

1993 Chicago Cubs
- League: National League
- Division: East
- Ballpark: Wrigley Field
- City: Chicago
- Record: 84–78 (.519)
- Divisional place: 4th
- Owners: Tribune Company
- General managers: Larry Himes
- Managers: Jim Lefebvre
- Television: WGN-TV/Superstation WGN (Harry Caray, Steve Stone, Thom Brennaman)
- Radio: WGN (Thom Brennaman, Ron Santo, Harry Caray)
- Stats: ESPN.com; Baseball Reference

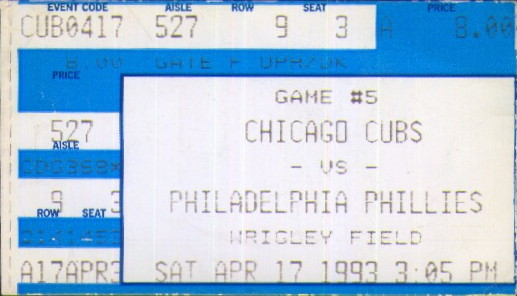
A ticket for a 1993 game between the Philadelphia Phillies and the Chicago Cubs.

The 1993 Chicago Cubs season was the 122nd season of the Chicago Cubs franchise, the 118th in the National League and the 78th at Wrigley Field. The Cubs finished fourth in the National League East with a record of 84–78. This was the first season where the player's names appeared on the back of the home jerseys. Prior to 1993, names had only been seen on the away jerseys since the 1979 season.

== Offseason ==
- December 2, 1992: Steve Lake was signed as a free agent with the Chicago Cubs.
- December 8, 1992: Dan Plesac was signed as a free agent with the Chicago Cubs.
- December 9, 1992: Randy Myers signed as a free agent with the Chicago Cubs.
- December 18, 1992: Willie Wilson was signed as a free agent with the Chicago Cubs.
- February 8, 1993: Steve Lyons was signed as a free agent with the Chicago Cubs.
- March 28, 1993: Steve Lyons was released by the Chicago Cubs.

== Regular season ==
=== Season standings ===
NL East
Team	W	L	Pct.	GB	Home	Road
Philadelphia Phillies	97	65	.599	—	52‍–‍29	45‍–‍36
Montreal Expos	94	68	.580	3	55‍–‍26	39‍–‍42
St. Louis Cardinals	87	75	.537	10	49‍–‍32	38‍–‍43
Chicago Cubs	84	78	.519	13	43‍–‍38	41‍–‍40
Pittsburgh Pirates	75	87	.463	22	40‍–‍41	35‍–‍46
Florida Marlins	64	98	.395	33	35‍–‍46	29‍–‍52
New York Mets	59	103	.364	38	28‍–‍53	31‍–‍50

=== Record vs. opponents ===
1993 National League record Source: MLB Standings Grid – 1993
Team	ATL	CHC	CIN	COL	FLA	HOU	LAD	MON	NYM	PHI	PIT	SD	SF	STL
Atlanta	—	7–5	10–3	13–0	7–5	8–5	8–5	7–5	9–3	6–6	7–5	9–4	7–6	6–6
Chicago	5–7	—	7–5	8–4	6–7	4–8	7–5	5–8–1	8–5	7–6	5–8	8–4	6–6	8–5
Cincinnati	3–10	5–7	—	9–4	7–5	6–7	5–8	4–8	6–6	4–8	8–4	9–4	2–11	5–7
Colorado	0–13	4–8	4–9	—	7–5	11–2	7–6	3–9	6–6	3–9	8–4	6–7	3–10	5–7
Florida	5–7	7–6	5–7	5–7	—	3–9	5–7	5–8	4–9	4–9	6–7	7–5	4–8	4–9
Houston	5–8	8–4	7–6	2–11	9–3	—	9–4	5–7	11–1	5–7	7–5	8–5	3–10	6–6
Los Angeles	5–8	5–7	8–5	6–7	7–5	4–9	—	6–6	8–4	2–10	8–4	9–4	7–6	6–6
Montreal	5–7	8–5–1	8–4	9–3	8–5	7–5	6–6	—	9–4	6–7	8–5	10–2	3–9	7–6
New York	3–9	5–8	6–6	6–6	9–4	1–11	4–8	4–9	—	3–10	4–9	5–7	4–8	5–8
Philadelphia	6-6	6–7	8–4	9–3	9–4	7–5	10–2	7–6	10–3	—	7–6	6–6	4–8	8–5
Pittsburgh	5–7	8–5	4–8	4–8	7–6	5–7	4–8	5–8	9–4	6–7	—	9–3	5–7	4–9
San Diego	4–9	4–8	4–9	7–6	5–7	5–8	4–9	2–10	7–5	6–6	3–9	—	3–10	7–5
San Francisco	6–7	6–6	11–2	10–3	8–4	10–3	6–7	9–3	8–4	8–4	7–5	10–3	—	4–8
St. Louis	6–6	5–8	7–5	7–5	9–4	6–6	6–6	6–7	8–5	5–8	9–4	5–7	8–4	—

=== Notable Transactions ===
- June 1, 1993: Heathcliff Slocumb was traded by the Chicago Cubs to the Cleveland Indians for Jose Hernandez.
- June 3, 1993: Brooks Kieschnick was drafted by the Chicago Cubs in the 1st round (10th pick) of the 1993 amateur draft. Player signed July 22, 1993.
- June 3, 1993: Steve Rain was drafted by the Chicago Cubs in the 11th round of the 1993 amateur draft. Player signed July 5, 1993.
- July 30, 1993: Karl Rhodes was traded as part of a 3-team trade by the Kansas City Royals to the Chicago Cubs. The New York Yankees sent John Habyan to the Kansas City Royals. The Chicago Cubs sent Paul Assenmacher to the New York Yankees.
- August 19, 1993: Glenallen Hill was traded by the Cleveland Indians to the Chicago Cubs for Candy Maldonado.

== Roster ==
1993 Chicago Cubs
Roster
Pitchers: 45 Paul Assenmacher; 38 José Bautista; 47 Shawn Boskie; 44 William Brennan; 52 Jim Bullinger; 49 Frank Castillo; 29 José Guzmán; 22 Mike Harkey; 37 Greg Hibbard; 35 Chuck McElroy; 35 Mike Morgan; 28 Randy Myers; 32 Dan Plesac; 30 Bob Scanlan; 51 Heathcliff Slocumb; 46 Steve Trachsel; 13 Turk Wendell	Catchers: 10 Steve Lake; 9 Matt Walbeck; 2 Rick Wilkins; Infielders: 24 Steve Buechele; 12 Shawon Dunston; 17 Mark Grace; 53 Doug Jennings; 11 Rey Sánchez; 23 Ryne Sandberg; 1 Tommy Shields; 16 José Vizcaíno; 20 Eric Yelding	Outfielders: 34 Glenallen Hill; 25 Candy Maldonado; 27 Derrick May; 25 Karl Rhodes; 19 Kevin Roberson; 18 Dwight Smith; 21 Sammy Sosa; 6 Willie Wilson; 39 Eduardo Zambrano	Manager: 5 Jim Lefebvre; Coaches: 40 Tony Muser (bullpen); 38 Billy Connors (pitching); 15 Chuck Cottier (third base); 3 José Martínez (first base); 41 Tom Trebelhorn (bench); 26 Billy Williams (hitting)

== Player stats ==
=== Batting ===
= Indicates team leader

==== Starters by position ====
Note: Pos = Position; G = Games played; AB = At bats; H = Hits; Avg. = Batting average; HR = Home runs; RBI = Runs batted in

Pos	Player	G	AB	H	Avg.	HR	RBI
C	Rick Wilkins	136	446	135	.303	30	73
1B	Mark Grace	155	594	193	.325	14	98
2B	Ryne Sandberg	117	456	141	.309	9	45
SS	Rey Sánchez	105	344	97	.282	0	28
3B	Steve Buechele	133	460	125	.272	15	65
LF	Derrick May	128	465	137	.295	10	77
CF	Willie Wilson	105	221	57	.258	1	11
RF	Sammy Sosa	159	598	156	.261	33	93

==== Other batters ====
Note: G = Games played; AB = At bats; H = Hits; Avg. = Batting average; HR = Home runs; RBI = Runs batted in

Player	G	AB	H	Avg.	HR	RBI
José Vizcaíno	151	551	158	.287	4	54
Dwight Smith	111	310	93	.300	11	35
Kevin Roberson	62	180	34	.189	9	27
Candy Maldonado	70	140	26	.186	3	15
Steve Lake	44	120	27	.225	5	13
Eric Yelding	69	108	22	.204	1	10
Glenallen Hill	31	87	30	.345	10	22
Tuffy Rhodes	15	52	15	.288	3	7
Doug Jennings	42	52	13	.250	2	8
Tommy Shields	20	34	6	.176	0	1
Matt Walbeck	11	30	6	.200	1	6
Eduardo Zambrano	8	17	5	.294	0	2
Shawon Dunston	7	10	4	.400	0	2

=== Pitching ===
= Indicates league leader

==== Starting pitchers ====
Note: G = Games pitched; IP = Innings pitched; W = Wins; L = Losses; ERA = Earned run average; SO = Strikeouts

Player	G	IP	W	L	ERA	SO
Mike Morgan	32	207.2	10	15	4.03	111
José Guzmán	30	191.0	12	10	4.34	163
Greg Hibbard	31	191.0	15	11	3.96	82
Mike Harkey	28	157.1	10	10	5.26	67
Frank Castillo	29	141.1	5	8	4.84	84
Steve Trachsel	3	19.2	0	2	4.58	14

==== Other pitchers ====
Note: G = Games pitched; IP = Innings pitched; W = Wins; L = Losses; ERA = Earned run average; SO = Strikeouts

Player	G	IP	W	L	ERA	SO
José Bautista	58	111.2	10	3	2.82	63
Turk Wendell	7	22.2	1	2	4.37	15
William Brennan	8	15.0	2	1	4.20	11

==== Relief pitchers ====
Note: G = Games pitched; W = Wins; L = Losses; SV = Saves; ERA = Earned run average; SO = Strikeouts

Player	G	W	L	SV	ERA	SO
Randy Myers	73	2	4	53	3.11	86
Bob Scanlan	70	4	5	0	4.54	44
Dan Plesac	57	2	1	0	4.74	47
Chuck McElroy	49	2	2	0	4.56	31
Paul Assenmacher	46	2	1	0	3.49	34
Shawn Boskie	39	5	3	0	3.43	39
Jim Bullinger	15	1	0	1	4.32	10
Heathcliff Slocumb	10	1	0	0	3.38	4

== Awards and honors ==
All-Star Game

- Ryne Sandberg, 2B, Starter
- Mark Grace, DH, Starter

== Farm system ==
Level	Team	League	Manager
AAA	Iowa Cubs	American Association	Marv Foley
AA	Orlando Cubs	Southern League	Tommy Jones
A	Daytona Cubs	Florida State League	Bill Hayes
A	Peoria Chiefs	Midwest League	Steve Roadcap
A-Short Season	Geneva Cubs	New York–Penn League	Jerry Weinstein
Rookie	Huntington Cubs	Appalachian League	Steve Kolinsky
Rookie	GCL Cubs	Gulf Coast League	Butch Hughes

LEAGUE CHAMPIONS: Iowa
