= Jody Reed =

American baseball player (born 1962)

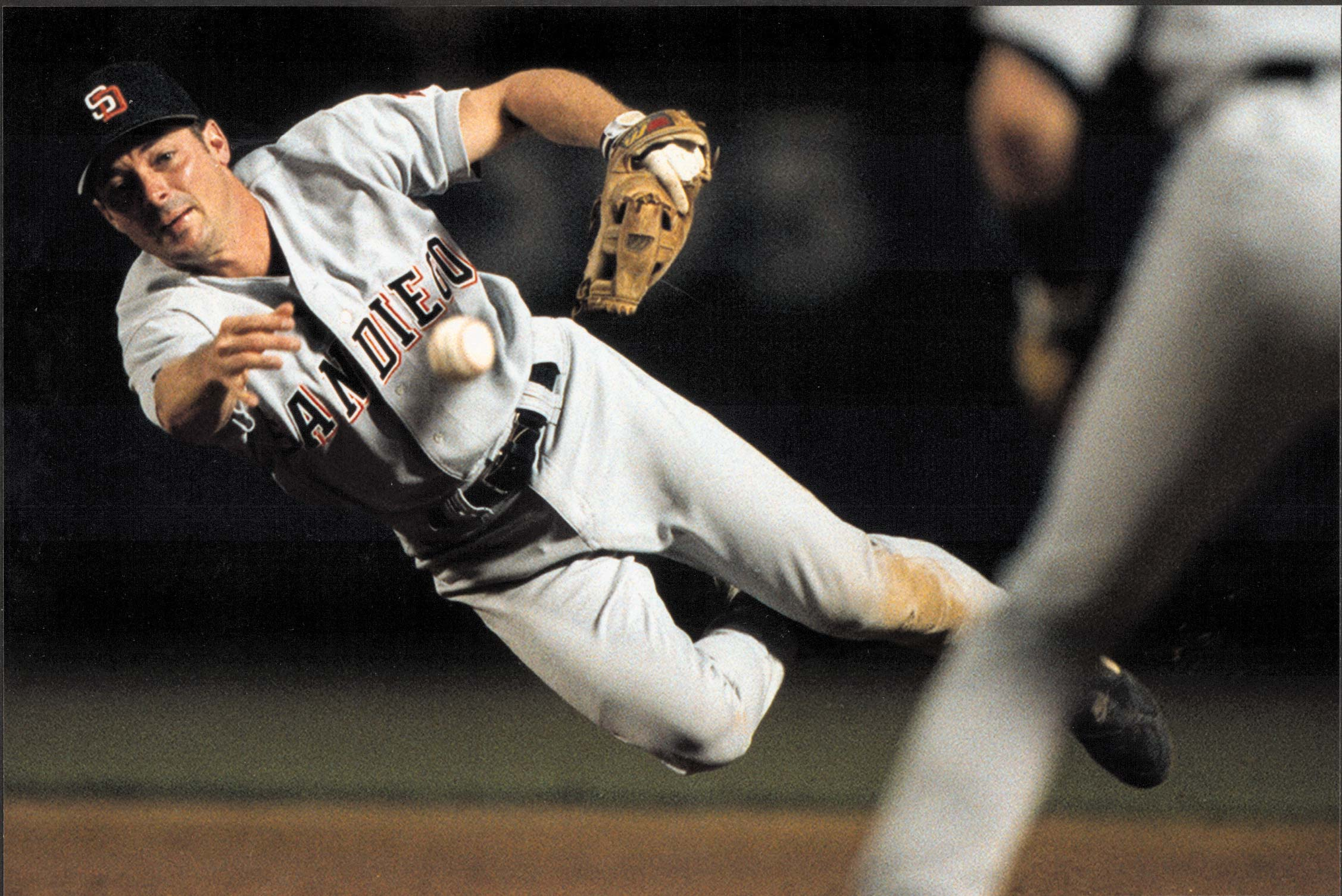
- Reed with the San Diego Padres
- Second baseman
- Born: July 26, 1962 (age 63); Tampa, Florida, U.S.
- Batted: Right Threw: Right

MLB debut
- September 12, 1987, for the Boston Red Sox

Last MLB appearance
- August 22, 1997, for the Detroit Tigers

MLB statistics
- Batting average: .270
- Home runs: 27
- Runs batted in: 392
- Stats at Baseball Reference

Teams
- Boston Red Sox (1987–1992); Los Angeles Dodgers (1993); Milwaukee Brewers (1994); San Diego Padres (1995–1996); Detroit Tigers (1997)

Jody Eric Reed (born July 26, 1962) is an American former professional baseball second baseman and infielder. He played 11 seasons in Major League Baseball (MLB) between 1987 and 1997 for the Boston Red Sox, Los Angeles Dodgers, Milwaukee Brewers, San Diego Padres, and Detroit Tigers.

== Playing career ==
=== Amateur ===
Reed attended Brandon High School in Brandon, Florida, and played college ball at Manatee Community College and Florida State University. He was drafted by the Texas Rangers in the third round of the 1982 MLB Draft (January phase) and second round of the 1983 MLB Draft (June secondary phase) and the San Francisco Giants in the first round of the 1982 MLB Draft (June secondary phase) but did not sign.

=== Boston Red Sox ===
Reed was drafted in the eighth round of the 1984 MLB draft by the Boston Red Sox and signed on June 11, 1984. He played with the Winter Haven Red Sox in the Florida State League in 1984 and 1985, batting .289.

Reed began 1986 with the New Britain Red Sox of the Eastern League and was promoted mid-season to the Pawtucket Red Sox of the International League.

Reed made his Major League debut for the Red Sox as a pinch runner on September 12, 1987 against the Baltimore Orioles. He made his first start, leading off and playing shortstop against the Orioles on September 18. Reed was 3 for 6 with two RBI and a stolen base in that game, with his first hit being a single off Jeff Ballard in the top of the fifth. He appeared in nine games that September, with nine hits in 30 at bats for a .300 average.

In 1988, Reed became the Red Sox' starting shortstop. He hit his first career home run on June 27, 1988, off John Farrell of the Cleveland Indians. He hit .293 that season and finished third in the Rookie of the Year voting.

Reed switched to second base during the 1989 season and played with the Red Sox through 1992. In 1990, he led the American League with 45 doubles and finished 10th in the AL with 173 hits. Reed also totaled more than 40 doubles in 1989 and 1991.

In 715 total games with the Red Sox, Reed hit .280 with 17 homers and 227 RBI. He also hit .250 in the 1988 American League Championship Series and .133 in the 1990 American League Championship Series.

=== Los Angeles Dodgers ===
Reed was drafted by the Colorado Rockies as the 13th pick in the 1992 MLB expansion draft on November 17, then traded to the Los Angeles Dodgers in exchange for Rudy Seánez.

He played in 132 games for the Dodgers during the 1993 season and hit .276.

=== Milwaukee Brewers ===
Reed was offered a three-year, $7.8 million contract extension by the Dodgers after the season, but turned it down in order to become a free agent. He eventually wound up signing a one-year contract with the Milwaukee Brewers for only $350,000 plus incentives.

Reed hit .271 with the Brewers in 108 games.

=== San Diego Padres ===
Reed signed a free agent contract with the San Diego Padres on April 19, 1995. In two seasons with the Padres he hit .250 in 277 games.

=== Detroit Tigers ===
The Padres traded Reed to the Detroit Tigers on March 22, 1997, in exchange for Mike Darr and Matt Skrmetta. He only played in 52 games in Detroit, hitting .196.

== Coaching career ==
Reed managed the Gulf Coast Yankees from 2007-2008 and was then minor league defensive coordinator for the New York Yankees organization from 2009-2010 and interim manager for the Staten Island Yankees at the start of 2010.

In 2011, Reed was the manager of the Arizona League Dodgers and the Coordinator of Instruction for the Dodgers Camelback Ranch facility in Glendale, Arizona. He was selected as "Manager of the Year" by the Arizona League in 2011. For 2012, Reed was named the "Infield Coordinator" for the Dodgers' minor league system and he was appointed manager of the Double-A Chattanooga Lookouts for 2013.

On December 13, 2022, the Miami Marlins named Reed their third base/infield coach for the 2023 season. On October 2, 2024, Reed was fired alongside the entirety of the Marlins coaching staff.

== See also ==
- List of Major League Baseball annual doubles leaders
