= Joe McIlvaine =

Baseball executive and professional baseball player

- Pitcher
- Born: 1949 (age 76–77); Narberth, Pennsylvania, U.S.
- Bats: Right Throws: Right
- Stats at Baseball Reference

Joseph Peter McIlvaine (born 1949) is an American baseball executive and former professional baseball player.

After graduating from Lower Merion High School, McIlvaine entered St. Charles Borromeo Seminary but, after receiving a bachelor of arts degree, decided to pursue a baseball career instead of the priesthood.

McIlvaine played in the Detroit Tigers minor league system for five seasons (1969–1973). He posted a win–loss record of 16–16 and an earned run average of 3.84. During the 1970s, he was a scout in the Baltimore Orioles, California Angels and Milwaukee Brewers organizations. He became the New York Mets' scouting director in 1981 and held that position until 1985. He served as the Mets' assistant general manager from 1986 to 1990 until he became the general manager of the San Diego Padres in 1991. He stayed in that position until 1993. In August 1993, he was hired to replace Al Harazin as the Mets' general manager, and he served as the Mets' general manager until July 1997. He was a special assistant to the Minnesota Twins general manager from 1998–2012. He was a special assistant to the general manager of the Seattle Mariners. McIlvaine returned to the Orioles as senior advisor, player personnel, the team announced Friday, February 12, 2016. He was to advise the executive team at the Major League level and on scouting, with a strong focus on the Major League Baseball draft.

McIlvaine left the Orioles in 2018.

== See also ==
- Career statistics from Baseball Reference (Minors)
- Baseball America
- New-York Historical Society

Preceded by Jack McKeon	San Diego Padres General Manager; 1991–1993	Succeeded by Randy Smith
Preceded by Al Harazin	New York Mets General Manager; 1993–1997	Succeeded by Steve Phillips
