= Al Harazin =

American baseball executive

Al Harazin (pronounced HAIR-uh-zin) served as the New York Mets assistant general manager from 1986 to 1990, and from 1992 to 1993 he served as their general manager.

== The Worst Team Money Could Buy ==
In 1991, he was the general manager of the Mets after Frank Cashen resigned. He saw a team declined from their 1986 World Championship Season to finishing under .500 for the first time since 1983, so he decided to go on a free agent shopping spree. First, he hired Jeff Torborg as their manager, even though Torborg was still under contract with the Chicago White Sox. Next, he signed Eddie Murray to the team for $7.5 million. He then got Bobby Bonilla for $29 million, traded Kevin McReynolds and Gregg Jefferies for Cy Young Award Bret Saberhagen. Plus, with having Vince Coleman on the team, some baseball experts pick the Mets to take the 1992 National League East. But after starting the season 21–15, the team became a soap opera as players feuded with each other, and their performances dropped as the team sank even further in the standings, finishing with only 72 wins, and 13 years later that 1992 team became a subject of a book called The Worst Team Money Could Buy by Bob Klapisch.

Preceded by Frank Cashen	New York Mets General manager 1992–1993	Succeeded by Joe McIlvaine
