= Tito Navarro =

Puerto Rican baseball player

- Shortstop
- Born: September 12, 1970 (age 54); Rio Piedras, Puerto Rico
- Batted: Switch Threw: Right

MLB debut
- September 6, 1993, for the New York Mets

Last MLB appearance
- October 3, 1993, for the New York Mets

MLB statistics
- Batting average: .059
- Home runs: 0
- Runs batted in: 1

Teams
- New York Mets (1993)

Norberto Navarro Rodríguez (born September 12, 1970) is a Puerto Rican former Major League Baseball pinch hitter and shortstop who played for the New York Mets in their 1993 season.

== Major League career ==
Navarro entered the majors on September 6, 1993, at the age of 22. He played in 12 games for the Mets that year and was used almost entirely as a pinch hitter (though he started two games at shortstop as well). In 17 at-bats, he collected one hit for a .059 batting average. He also collected an RBI and scored a run. He played his final game on October 3.

He did not commit an error in the field.

== Minor league career ==
Navarro played in the minor leagues from 1988 to 1991 and from 1993 to 1994, spending his entire career in the Mets' system. In 552 games, he hit .286 with 543 hits, 141 stolen bases and 288 runs scored.

He showed some flashes of excellence throughout his career. For example, he hit .311 with 50 stolen bases for the Columbia Mets and Jackson Mets in 1990 and the following year, with the Williamsport Bills, he stole 42 bases. He also showed an excellent eye at the plate both years, as he walked 144 times combined, compared to only 120 strikeouts.
