= Ryan Thompson (outfielder) =

American baseball player (born 1967)

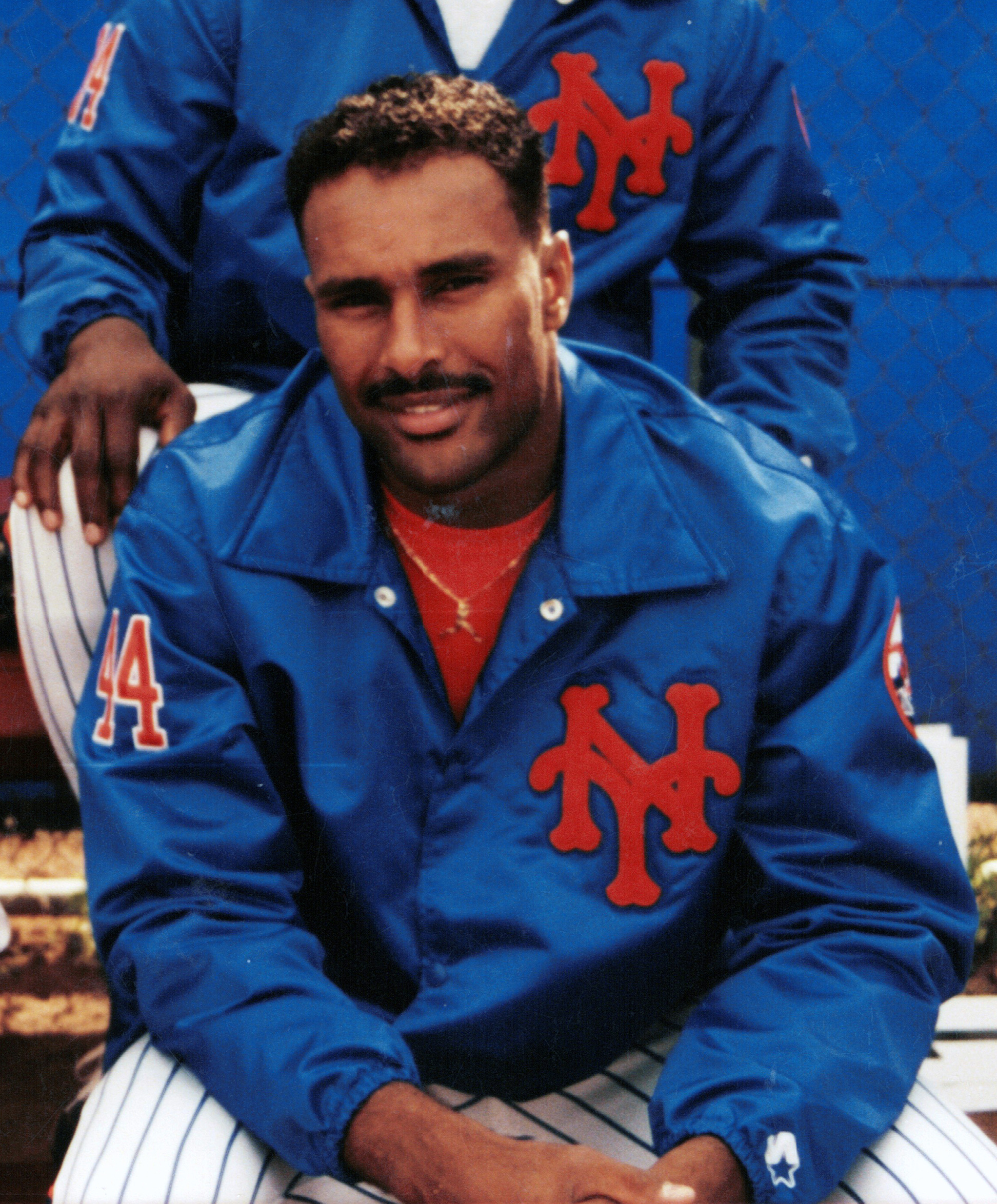
- Thompson as a member of the New York Mets in 1992
- Outfielder
- Born: November 4, 1967 (age 59); Chestertown, Maryland, U.S.
- Batted: Right Threw: Right

Professional debut
- MLB: September 1, 1992, for the New York Mets
- NPB: April 4, 1998, for the Fukuoka Daiei Hawks

Last appearance
- MLB: September 17, 2002, for the Milwaukee Brewers
- NPB: June 6, 1998, for the Fukuoka Daiei Hawks

MLB statistics
- Batting average: .243
- Home runs: 52
- Runs batted in: 176
- Stats at Baseball Reference

Teams
- New York Mets (1992–1995); Cleveland Indians (1996); Fukuoka Daiei Hawks (1998); Houston Astros (1999); New York Yankees (2000); Florida Marlins (2001); Milwaukee Brewers (2002)

Ryan Orlando Thompson (born November 4, 1967) is an American former professional baseball outfielder. He played all or parts of nine seasons in the majors between 1992 and 2002 for the New York Mets, Cleveland Indians, Houston Astros, New York Yankees, Florida Marlins and Milwaukee Brewers of Major League Baseball (MLB). Thompson also played one season in Japan for the Fukuoka Daiei Hawks in 1998.

Ryan Thompson was traded by the Toronto Blue Jays to the Mets in 1992, along with Jeff Kent, for David Cone.

Thompson is the father of basketball player Trevor Thompson.
