= 1993 Major League Baseball season =

1993 MLB season
- League: Major League Baseball
- Sport: Baseball
- Duration: April 5 – October 23, 1993
- Games: 162
- Teams: 28
- TV partner(s): CBS; ESPN

Draft
- Top draft pick: Alex Rodriguez
- Picked by: Seattle Mariners

Regular Season
- Season MVP: AL: Frank Thomas (CWS); NL: Barry Bonds (SF)

Postseason
- AL champions: Toronto Blue Jays
- AL runners-up: Chicago White Sox
- NL champions: Philadelphia Phillies
- NL runners-up: Atlanta Braves

World Series
- Champions: Toronto Blue Jays
- Runners-up: Philadelphia Phillies
- World Series MVP: Paul Molitor (TOR)

MLB seasons
- ← 1992 1994 →

Locations of teams for the 1992–1993 American League seasons
West East
Locations of teams for the 1993 National League season
West East

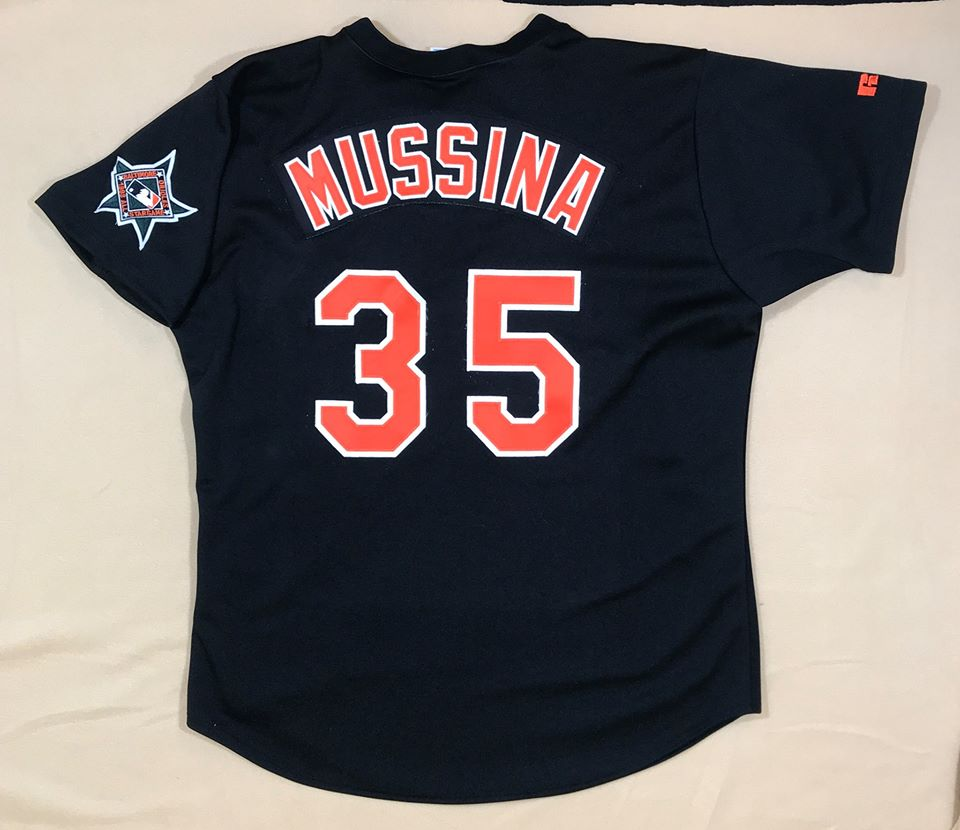
1993 Baltimore Orioles #35 Mike Mussina alternate jersey

The 1993 Major League Baseball season was the final season of two-division play in each league, before central divisions were added the following season, giving both the National League (NL) and American League (AL) three divisions each. Also, it was the last season of the four-team playoff, which was expanded to eight teams the following season that featured the three division winners and the Wild Card (the highest ranked non-division winner.)

Sixteen years after the AL expanded from 12 to 14 teams, the NL finally followed suit, with the Colorado Rockies and the Florida Marlins (now the Miami Marlins) joining the NL. As a result, it was the first season since 1976 that both leagues had the same number of teams. The Toronto Blue Jays capped off the season by winning their second consecutive World Series title, beating the Philadelphia Phillies in six games. The World Series was clinched when, in one of the most famous moments in baseball history, Joe Carter hit a three-run walk-off home run in the bottom of the ninth inning of Game 6 to seal the victory.

== Awards and honors ==
- Baseball Hall of Fame
  - Reggie Jackson

Baseball Writers' Association of America Awards
BBWAA Award	National League	American League
Rookie of the Year	Mike Piazza (LAD)	Tim Salmon (CAL)
Cy Young Award	Greg Maddux (ATL)	Jack McDowell (CWS)
Manager of the Year	Dusty Baker (SF)	Gene Lamont (CWS)
Most Valuable Player	Barry Bonds (SF)	Frank Thomas (CWS)
Gold Glove Awards
Position	National League	American League
Pitcher	Greg Maddux (ATL)	Mark Langston (CAL)
Catcher	Kirt Manwaring (SF)	Iván Rodríguez (TEX)
First Baseman	Mark Grace (CHC)	Don Mattingly (NYY)
Second Baseman	Robby Thompson (SF)	Roberto Alomar (TOR)
Third Baseman	Matt Williams (SF)	Robin Ventura (CWS)
Shortstop	Jay Bell (PIT)	Omar Vizquel (SEA)
Outfielders	Barry Bonds (SF)	Kenny Lofton (CLE)
Outfielders	Larry Walker (MON)	Devon White (TOR)
Outfielders	Marquis Grissom (MON)	Ken Griffey Jr. (SEA)
Silver Slugger Awards
Pitcher/Designated Hitter	Orel Hershiser (LAD)	Paul Molitor (TOR)
Catcher	Mike Piazza (LAD)	Mike Stanley (NYY)
First Baseman	Fred McGriff (SD, ATL)	Frank Thomas (CWS)
Second Baseman	Robby Thompson (SF)	Carlos Baerga (CLE)
Third Baseman	Matt Williams (SF)	Wade Boggs (NYY)
Shortstop	Jay Bell (PIT)	Cal Ripken Jr. (BAL)
Outfielders	Barry Bonds (SF)	Albert Belle (CLE)
Outfielders	Lenny Dykstra (PHI)	Juan González (TEX)
Outfielders	David Justice (ATL)	Ken Griffey Jr. (SEA)

=== Other awards ===
- Outstanding Designated Hitter Award: Paul Molitor (TOR)
- Roberto Clemente Award (Humanitarian): Barry Larkin (CIN)
- Rolaids Relief Man Award: Jeff Montgomery (KC, AL); Randy Myers (CHC, NL)

=== Player of the Month ===
Month	American League	National League
April	John Olerud	Barry Bonds
May	Paul Molitor	Jeff Bagwell
June	John Olerud	Andrés Galarraga
July	Rafael Palmeiro	Fred McGriff
August	Frank Thomas	Tony Gwynn
September	Chris Hoiles	Andrés Galarraga

=== Pitcher of the Month ===
Month	American League	National League
April	Jimmy Key	Ken Hill
May	Danny Darwin	Tommy Greene
June	Rick Aguilera	Chris Hammond; Darryl Kile
July	Fernando Valenzuela	Bill Swift
August	Bill Gullickson	Greg Maddux
September	Wilson Álvarez	John Wetteland

== Statistical leaders ==
Statistic	American League		National League	
AVG	John Olerud TOR	.363	Andrés Galarraga COL	.370
HR	Juan González TEX	46	Barry Bonds SF	46
RBI	Albert Belle CLE	129	Barry Bonds SF	123
Wins	Jack McDowell CWS	22	John Burkett SF	22
ERA	Kevin Appier KC	2.56	Greg Maddux ATL	2.36
SO	Randy Johnson SEA	308	José Rijo CIN	227
SV	Jeff Montgomery KC; Duane Ward TOR	45	Randy Myers CHC	53
SB	Kenny Lofton CLE	70	Chuck Carr FLA	58

== Standings ==
=== American League ===
AL East
Team	W	L	Pct.	GB	Home	Road
Toronto Blue Jays	95	67	.586	—	48‍–‍33	47‍–‍34
New York Yankees	88	74	.543	7	50‍–‍31	38‍–‍43
Baltimore Orioles	85	77	.525	10	48‍–‍33	37‍–‍44
Detroit Tigers	85	77	.525	10	44‍–‍37	41‍–‍40
Boston Red Sox	80	82	.494	15	43‍–‍38	37‍–‍44
Cleveland Indians	76	86	.469	19	46‍–‍35	30‍–‍51
Milwaukee Brewers	69	93	.426	26	38‍–‍43	31‍–‍50

AL West
Team	W	L	Pct.	GB	Home	Road
Chicago White Sox	94	68	.580	—	45‍–‍36	49‍–‍32
Texas Rangers	86	76	.531	8	50‍–‍31	36‍–‍45
Kansas City Royals	84	78	.519	10	43‍–‍38	41‍–‍40
Seattle Mariners	82	80	.506	12	46‍–‍35	36‍–‍45
California Angels	71	91	.438	23	44‍–‍37	27‍–‍54
Minnesota Twins	71	91	.438	23	36‍–‍45	35‍–‍46
Oakland Athletics	68	94	.420	26	38‍–‍43	30‍–‍51

=== National League ===
NL East
Team	W	L	Pct.	GB	Home	Road
Philadelphia Phillies	97	65	.599	—	52‍–‍29	45‍–‍36
Montreal Expos	94	68	.580	3	55‍–‍26	39‍–‍42
St. Louis Cardinals	87	75	.537	10	49‍–‍32	38‍–‍43
Chicago Cubs	84	78	.519	13	43‍–‍38	41‍–‍40
Pittsburgh Pirates	75	87	.463	22	40‍–‍41	35‍–‍46
Florida Marlins	64	98	.395	33	35‍–‍46	29‍–‍52
New York Mets	59	103	.364	38	28‍–‍53	31‍–‍50

NL West
Team	W	L	Pct.	GB	Home	Road
Atlanta Braves	104	58	.642	—	51‍–‍30	53‍–‍28
San Francisco Giants	103	59	.636	1	50‍–‍31	53‍–‍28
Houston Astros	85	77	.525	19	44‍–‍37	41‍–‍40
Los Angeles Dodgers	81	81	.500	23	41‍–‍40	40‍–‍41
Cincinnati Reds	73	89	.451	31	41‍–‍40	32‍–‍49
Colorado Rockies	67	95	.414	37	39‍–‍42	28‍–‍53
San Diego Padres	61	101	.377	43	34‍–‍47	27‍–‍54

== Postseason ==
=== Bracket ===
League Championship Series (ALCS, NLCS)
East	Toronto	4
West	Chicago White Sox	2
East	Philadelphia	4
West	Atlanta	2

World Series
AL	Toronto	4
NL	Philadelphia	2

== Managers ==
=== American League ===
Team	Manager	Comments
Baltimore Orioles	Johnny Oates	
Boston Red Sox	Butch Hobson	
California Angels	Buck Rodgers	
Chicago White Sox	Gene Lamont	Won American League West
Cleveland Indians	Mike Hargrove	
Detroit Tigers	Sparky Anderson	
Kansas City Royals	Hal McRae	
Milwaukee Brewers	Phil Garner	
Minnesota Twins	Tom Kelly	
New York Yankees	Buck Showalter	
Oakland Athletics	Tony La Russa	
Seattle Mariners	Lou Piniella	
Texas Rangers	Kevin Kennedy	
Toronto Blue Jays	Cito Gaston	Won World Series

=== National League ===
Team	Manager	Comments
Atlanta Braves	Bobby Cox	Won National League West
Chicago Cubs	Jim Lefebvre	
Cincinnati Reds	Tony Pérez	Replaced during the season by Davey Johnson
Colorado Rockies	Don Baylor	Expansion team
Florida Marlins	Rene Lachemann	Expansion team
Houston Astros	Art Howe	
Los Angeles Dodgers	Tommy Lasorda	
Montreal Expos	Felipe Alou	
New York Mets	Jeff Torborg	Replaced during the season by Dallas Green
Philadelphia Phillies	Jim Fregosi	Won the National League pennant
Pittsburgh Pirates	Jim Leyland	
St. Louis Cardinals	Joe Torre	
San Diego Padres	Jim Riggleman	
San Francisco Giants	Dusty Baker	

== Milestones ==
=== Batters ===
- Carlos Baerga (CLE):
  - Became the first player to hit a home run from both sides of the plate in the same inning on April 8.
- Carlton Fisk (CWS):
  - In his final MLB season, set the record for most games caught, surpassing Bob Boone on June 22.
- Ken Griffey Jr. (SEA):
  - Tied a major league record by becoming the third player and second AL player to hit home runs in eight consecutive games between July 20 and 28.
- Dave Winfield (MIN):
  - Became the 19th member of the 3,000-hit club with a single in the ninth inning against the California Angels on September 16.

=== Pitchers ===
- Nolan Ryan (TEX):
  - Set a major league record for most career strikeouts at 5,714, when Ryan struck out Greg Myers of the California Angels struck out in the fifth inning on September 17.

== Home field attendance and payroll ==
Team name	Wins	%±	Home attendance	%±	Per game	Est. payroll	%±
Colorado Rockies	67		4,483,350		55,350	$10,353,500	
Toronto Blue Jays	95	−1.0%	4,057,947	0.7%	50,098	$47,279,166	5.6%
Atlanta Braves	104	6.1%	3,884,720	26.2%	47,960	$41,641,417	20.3%
Baltimore Orioles	85	−4.5%	3,644,965	2.2%	45,000	$29,096,500	21.8%
Los Angeles Dodgers	81	28.6%	3,170,393	28.2%	39,141	$39,440,999	−11.9%
Philadelphia Phillies	97	38.6%	3,137,674	62.8%	38,737	$28,538,334	16.5%
Florida Marlins	64		3,064,847		37,838	$19,330,545	
St. Louis Cardinals	87	4.8%	2,844,977	17.6%	35,123	$23,367,334	−15.3%
Chicago Cubs	84	7.7%	2,653,763	24.8%	32,363	$39,386,666	32.0%
San Francisco Giants	103	43.1%	2,606,354	67.0%	32,177	$35,159,000	6.0%
Chicago White Sox	94	9.3%	2,581,091	−3.7%	31,865	$39,696,166	31.6%
Cincinnati Reds	73	−18.9%	2,453,232	5.9%	30,287	$44,879,666	34.2%
Boston Red Sox	80	9.6%	2,422,021	−1.9%	29,901	$37,120,583	−14.9%
New York Yankees	88	15.8%	2,416,942	38.2%	29,839	$42,723,000	13.5%
Texas Rangers	86	11.7%	2,244,616	2.1%	27,711	$36,376,959	20.7%
Cleveland Indians	76	0.0%	2,177,908	77.9%	26,888	$18,561,000	98.0%
Houston Astros	85	4.9%	2,084,618	72.1%	25,736	$30,210,500	96.1%
California Angels	71	−1.4%	2,057,460	−0.4%	25,401	$28,588,334	−17.7%
Seattle Mariners	82	28.1%	2,052,638	24.3%	25,341	$33,646,333	44.4%
Minnesota Twins	71	−21.1%	2,048,673	−17.5%	25,292	$28,217,933	0.7%
Oakland Athletics	68	−29.2%	2,035,025	−18.4%	25,124	$37,812,333	−7.9%
Detroit Tigers	85	13.3%	1,971,421	38.4%	24,339	$38,150,165	39.6%
Kansas City Royals	84	16.7%	1,934,578	3.6%	23,884	$41,455,167	22.3%
New York Mets	59	−18.1%	1,873,183	5.3%	23,126	$39,043,667	−12.5%
Milwaukee Brewers	69	−25.0%	1,688,080	−9.1%	20,840	$23,806,834	−23.2%
Pittsburgh Pirates	75	−21.9%	1,650,593	−9.8%	20,378	$24,822,467	−26.9%
Montreal Expos	94	8.0%	1,641,437	−1.7%	20,265	$18,899,333	19.4%
San Diego Padres	61	−25.6%	1,375,432	−20.1%	16,981	$25,511,333	−5.0%

== Television coverage ==
This was the final season under MLB's four-year deals with CBS and ESPN. While ESPN renewed its contract, CBS declined. MLB would then form The Baseball Network, a joint venture with ABC and NBC to replace CBS in televising games on broadcast television.

Network	Day of week	Announcers
CBS	Saturday afternoons	Sean McDonough, Tim McCarver, Greg Gumbel, Jim Kaat
ESPN	Sunday nights Tuesday nights Wednesday nights Friday nights	Jon Miller, Joe Morgan See also: List of ESPN Major League Baseball broadcasters

== See also ==
- 1993 in baseball (Events, Movies, Births, Deaths)
- 1993 Nippon Professional Baseball season
