= 1995 Florida Marlins season =

1995 Florida Marlins
- League: National League
- Division: East
- Ballpark: Joe Robbie Stadium
- City: Miami Gardens, Florida
- Record: 67–76 (.469)
- Divisional place: 4th
- Owners: Wayne Huizenga
- General managers: Dave Dombrowski
- Managers: Rene Lachemann
- Television: Sunshine Network; WBFS-TV (Gary Carter, Jay Randolph)
- Radio: WQAM (Joe Angel, Dave O'Brien); WCMQ-FM (Spanish) (Felo Ramírez, Manolo Alvarez)

The 1995 Florida Marlins season was the 3rd season for the Major League Baseball (MLB) franchise in the National League. It would begin with the team attempting to improve on their season from 1994. Their manager was Rene Lachemann. They played home games at Joe Robbie Stadium. They finished with a record of 67–76, fourth in the National League East Division. The Marlins scored 673 runs and allowed 673 runs to finish with a run differential of zero.

== Offseason ==
- December 6, 1994: Bret Barberie was traded by the Marlins to the Baltimore Orioles for Jay Powell.

== Regular season ==
=== Season standings ===
NL East
Team	W	L	Pct.	GB	Home	Road
Atlanta Braves	90	54	.625	—	44‍–‍28	46‍–‍26
New York Mets	69	75	.479	21	40‍–‍32	29‍–‍43
Philadelphia Phillies	69	75	.479	21	35‍–‍37	34‍–‍38
Florida Marlins	67	76	.469	22½	37‍–‍34	30‍–‍42
Montreal Expos	66	78	.458	24	31‍–‍41	35‍–‍37

=== Record vs. opponents ===
1995 National League record Source: MLB Standings Grid – 1995
Team	ATL	CHC	CIN	COL	FLA	HOU	LAD	MON	NYM	PHI	PIT	SD	SF	STL
Atlanta	—	8–4	8–5	9–4	10–3	6–6	5–4	9–4	5–8	7–6	4–2	5–2	7–1	7–5
Chicago	4–8	—	3–7	6–7	8–4	5–8	7–5	3–5	4–3	6–1	8–5	5–7	5–7	9–4
Cincinnati	5–8	7–3	—	5–7	6–6	12–1	4–3	8–4	7–5	9–3	8–5	3–6	3–3	8–5
Colorado	4–9	7–6	7–5	—	5–7	4–4	4–9	7–1	5–4	4–2	8–4	9–4	8–5	5–7
Florida	3–10	4–8	6–6	7–5	—	8–4	3–7	6–7	7–6	6–7	5–8	3–2	5–3	4–3
Houston	6–6	8–5	1–12	4–4	4–8	—	3–2	9–3	6–6	5–7	9–4	7–4	5–3	9–4
Los Angeles	4–5	5–7	3–4	9–4	7–3	2–3	—	7–5	6–6	4–9	9–4	7–6	8–5	7–5
Montreal	4–9	5–3	4–8	1–7	7–6	3–9	5–7	—	7–6	8–5	4–4	7–5	7–6	4–3
New York	8–5	3–4	5–7	4–5	6–7	6–6	6–6	6–7	—	7–6	4–3	6–7	5–8	3–4
Philadelphia	6-7	1–6	3–9	2–4	7–6	7–5	9–4	5–8	6–7	—	6–3	6–6	6–6	5–4
Pittsburgh	2–4	5–8	5–8	4–8	8–5	4–9	4–9	4–4	3–4	3–6	—	4–8	6–6	6–7
San Diego	2–5	7–5	6–3	4–9	2–3	4–7	6–7	5–7	7–6	6–6	8–4	—	6–7	7–5
San Francisco	1–7	7–5	3–3	5–8	3–5	3–5	5–8	6–7	8–5	6–6	6–6	7–6	—	7–6
St. Louis	5–7	4–9	5–8	7–5	3–4	4-9	5–7	3–4	4–3	4–5	7–6	5–7	6–7	—

=== Notable transactions ===
- April 5, 1995: Mario Díaz was signed as a free agent with the Florida Marlins.
- April 7, 1995: Terry Pendleton was signed as a free agent by the Marlins.
- April 10, 1995: Andre Dawson was signed as a free agent by the Marlins.
- April 26, 1995: Aaron Small was traded by the Toronto Blue Jays to the Florida Marlins for a player to be named later. The Florida Marlins sent Ernie Delgado (minors) (September 19, 1995) to the Toronto Blue Jays to complete the trade.
- June 21, 1995: Doug Dascenzo was signed as a free agent with the Florida Marlins.
- July 30, 1995: Mark Davis was signed as a free agent by the Marlins.
- August 7, 1995: Buddy Groom was traded by the Detroit Tigers to the Florida Marlins for a player to be named later. The Florida Marlins sent Mike Myers (August 9, 1995) to the Detroit Tigers to complete the trade.

=== Roster ===
1995 Florida Marlins
Roster
Pitchers: 30 Willie Banks; 46 Ryan Bowen; 33 John Burkett; 27 Matt Dunbar; 27 Rich Garces; 28 Mark Gardner; 50 Buddy Groom; 11 Chris Hammond; 34 Bryan Harvey; 42 Jeremy Hernandez; 40 John Johnstone; 24 Richie Lewis; 18 Matt Mantei; 51 Terry Mathews; 44 Rob Murphy; 27,32 Mike Myers; 31 Robb Nen; 44,32 Alejandro Peña; 58 Yorkis Pérez; 59 Jay Powell; 48 Pat Rapp; 37 Rich Scheid; 37 Aaron Small; 44 Marc Valdes; 52 Randy Veres; 35 David Weathers; 36 Bobby Witt	Catchers: 25 Steve Decker; 23 Charles Johnson; 13 Bob Natal; Infielders: 7 Kurt Abbott; 26 Alex Arias; 4 Greg Colbrunn; 29 Mario Díaz; 9 Terry Pendleton; 3 Quilvio Veras; 16 Eddie Zosky	Outfielders: 14 Jerry Browne; 21 Chuck Carr; 19 Jeff Conine; 8 Andre Dawson; 6 Tommy Gregg; 45 Russ Morman; 10 Gary Sheffield; 20 Jesús Tavárez; 17 Darrell Whitmore	Manager: 15 Rene Lachemann; Coaches: 12 Joe Breeden (Bullpen); 22 Rusty Kuntz (1st Base); 43 José Morales (Hitting); 1 Cookie Rojas (3rd Base); 47 Larry Rothschild (Pitching); 38 Rick Williams (Assistant Pitching)

== Player stats ==
=== Batting ===
==== Starters by position ====
Note: Pos = Position; G = Games played; AB = At bats; H = Hits; Avg. = Batting average; HR = Home runs; RBI = Runs batted in

Pos	Player	G	AB	H	Avg.	HR	RBI
C	Charles Johnson	97	315	79	.251	11	39
1B	Greg Colbrunn	138	528	146	.277	23	89
2B	Quilvio Veras	124	440	115	.261	5	32
SS	Kurt Abbott	120	420	107	.255	17	60
3B	Terry Pendleton	133	513	149	.290	14	78
LF	Jeff Conine	133	483	146	.302	25	105
CF	Chuck Carr	105	308	70	.227	2	20
RF	Gary Sheffield	63	213	69	.324	16	46

==== Other batters ====
Note: G = Games played; AB = At bats; H = Hits; Avg. = Batting average; HR = Home runs; RBI = Runs batted in

Player	G	AB	H	Avg.	HR	RBI
Andre Dawson	79	226	58	.257	8	37
Alex Arias	94	216	58	.269	3	26
Jesús Tavárez	63	190	55	.289	2	13
Jerry Browne	77	184	47	.255	1	17
Tommy Gregg	72	156	37	.237	6	20
Steve Decker	51	133	30	.226	3	13
Mario Díaz	49	87	20	.230	1	6
Russ Morman	34	72	20	.278	3	7
Darrell Whitmore	27	58	11	.190	1	2
Bob Natal	16	43	10	.233	2	6
Eddie Zosky	6	5	1	.200	0	0

=== Pitching ===
==== Starting pitchers ====
Note: G = Games pitched; IP = Innings pitched; W = Wins; L = Losses; ERA = Earned run average; SO = Strikeouts

Player	G	IP	W	L	ERA	SO
John Burkett	30	188.1	14	14	4.30	126
Pat Rapp	28	167.1	14	7	3.44	102
Chris Hammond	25	161.0	9	6	3.80	126
Bobby Witt	19	110.2	2	7	3.90	95
Willie Banks	9	50.0	2	3	4.32	30
Marc Valdes	3	7.0	0	0	14.14	2

==== Other pitchers ====
Note: G = Games pitched; IP = Innings pitched; W = Wins; L = Losses; ERA = Earned run average; SO = Strikeouts

Player	G	IP	W	L	ERA	SO
Mark Gardner	39	102.1	5	5	4.49	87
David Weathers	28	90.1	4	5	5.98	60
Ryan Bowen	4	16.2	2	0	3.78	15

==== Relief pitchers ====
Note: G = Games pitched; W = Wins; L = Losses; SV = Saves; ERA = Earned run average; SO = Strikeouts

Player	G	W	L	SV	ERA	SO
Robb Nen	62	0	7	23	3.29	68
Yorkis Pérez	69	2	6	1	5.21	47
Terry Mathews	57	4	4	3	3.38	72
Randy Veres	47	4	4	1	3.88	31
Richie Lewis	21	0	1	0	3.75	32
Buddy Groom	14	1	2	0	7.20	12
Alejandro Peña	13	2	0	0	1.50	21
Matt Mantei	12	0	1	0	4.73	15
Rich Garcés	11	0	2	0	5.40	16
Jay Powell	9	0	0	0	1.08	4
Rob Murphy	8	1	1	0	9.82	5
Matt Dunbar	8	0	1	0	11.57	5
Jeremy Hernandez	7	0	0	0	11.57	5
Aaron Small	7	1	0	0	1.42	5
Rich Scheid	6	0	0	0	6.10	10
John Johnstone	4	0	0	0	3.86	3
Mike Myers	2	0	0	0	0.00	0
Bryan Harvey	1	0	0	0	inf	0

== Farm system ==
Level	Team	League	Manager
AAA	Charlotte Knights	International League	Sal Rende
AA	Portland Sea Dogs	Eastern League	Carlos Tosca
A	Brevard County Manatees	Florida State League	Fredi González
A	Kane County Cougars	Midwest League	Lynn Jones
A-Short Season	Elmira Pioneers	New York–Penn League	Paul Kirsch
Rookie	GCL Marlins	Gulf Coast League	Juan Bustabad
