= 1993 Florida Marlins season =

1993 Florida Marlins
- League: National League
- Division: East
- Ballpark: Joe Robbie Stadium
- City: Miami Gardens, Florida
- Record: 64–98 (.395)
- Divisional place: 6th
- Owners: Wayne Huizenga
- General managers: Dave Dombrowski
- Managers: Rene Lachemann
- Television: Sunshine Network; WBFS-TV (Gary Carter, Jay Randolph)
- Radio: WQAM (Joe Angel, Dave O'Brien); WCMQ-FM (Spanish) (Felo Ramírez, Manolo Alvarez)

The 1993 Florida Marlins season was the first season for the team, part of the 1993 Major League Baseball expansion. Their manager was Rene Lachemann. They played home games at Joe Robbie Stadium. They finished 33 games behind the NL Champion Philadelphia Phillies, with a record of 64–98, sixth in the National League East, ahead of only the New York Mets.

The last remaining active member of the 1993 Florida Marlins was Trevor Hoffman, who retired after the 2010 season.

== Offseason ==
=== 1992 pre-expansion draft transactions ===
- February 14, 1992: Édgar Rentería was signed as an amateur free agent by the Marlins.
- June 1, 1992: Charles Johnson was drafted by the Marlins in the first round (28th pick) of the 1992 Major League Baseball draft. Player signed November 5, 1992.

=== Expansion draft ===
The 1992 MLB expansion draft was held on November 17, 1992. As opposed to previous expansion drafts such as the 1961 draft, players from both leagues were available to the expansion clubs. Each existing club could protect fifteen players on their roster from being drafted and only one player could be drafted from each team in the first round. Then for each additional round National League teams could protect an additional three players and American League teams could protect four more. All unprotected major and minor league players were eligible except those chosen in the amateur drafts of 1991 or 1992 and players who were 18 or younger when signed in 1990.

==== Round 1 ====
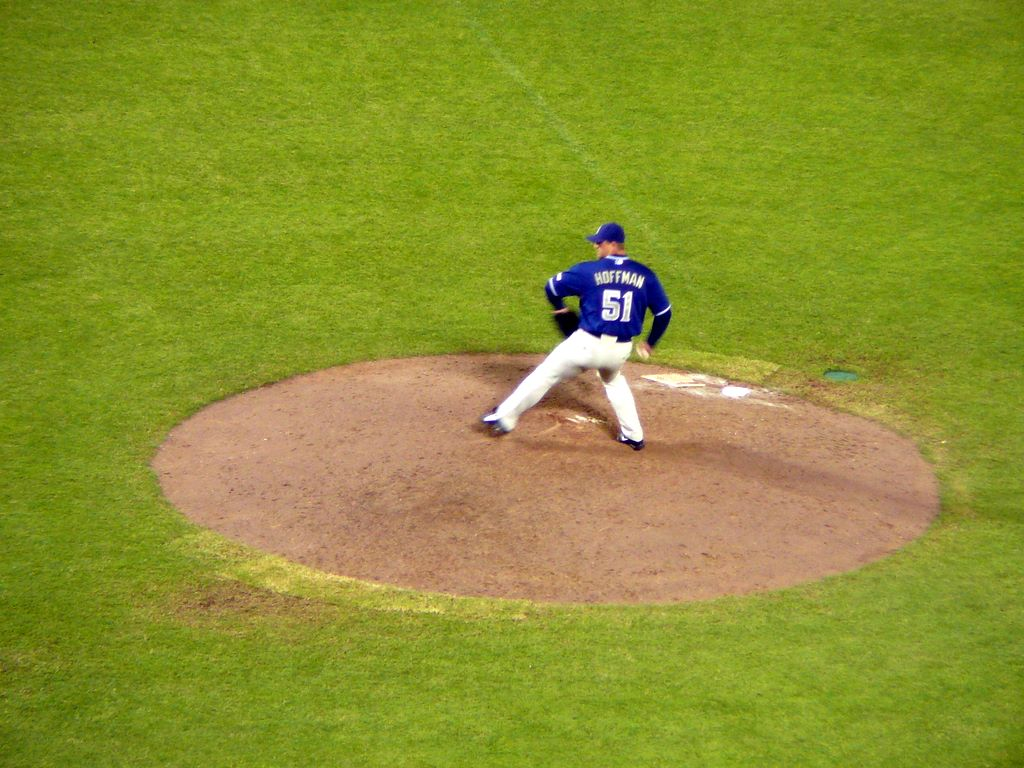
Trevor Hoffman, the all-time career leader in saves, was one of the more notable picks of the 1992 Expansion Draft, selected with the 8th pick overall.

Pick	Player	Position	From	To
2	Nigel Wilson	OF	TOR	FLA
4	José Martínez	RHP	NYM	FLA
6	Bret Barberie	SS	MON	FLA
8	Trevor Hoffman	RHP	CIN	FLA
10	Pat Rapp	RHP	SF	FLA
12	Greg Hibbard	LHP	CWS	FLA
14	Chuck Carr	OF	STL	FLA
16	Darrell Whitmore	OF	CLE	FLA
18	Eric Helfand	C	OAK	FLA
20	Bryan Harvey	RHP	CAL	FLA
22	Jeff Conine	1B/OF	KC	FLA
24	Kip Yaughn	RHP	BAL	FLA
26	Jesús Tavárez	OF	SEA	FLA

==== Round 2 ====
Pick	Player	Position	From	To
27	Carl Everett	OF	NYY	FLA
29	Dave Weathers	RHP	TOR	FLA
31	John Johnstone	RHP	NYM	FLA
33	Ramón Martínez	SS	PIT	FLA
35	Steve Decker	C	SF	FLA
37	Cris Carpenter	RHP	STL	FLA
39	Jack Armstrong	RHP	CLE	FLA
41	Scott Chiamparino	RHP	TEX	FLA
43	Tom Edens	RHP	MIN	FLA
45	Andrés Berumen	RHP	KC	FLA
47	Robert Person	RHP	CWS	FLA
49	Jim Corsi	RHP	OAK	FLA
51	Richie Lewis	RHP	BAL	FLA

==== Round 3 ====
Pick	Player	Position	From	To
53	Danny Jackson	LHP	PIT	FLA
55	Bob Natal	C	MON	FLA
57	Jamie McAndrew	RHP	LAD	FLA
59	Junior Félix	OF	CAL	FLA
61	Kerwin Moore	OF	KC	FLA
63	Ryan Bowen	RHP	HOU	FLA
65	Scott Baker	LHP	STL	FLA
67	Chris Donnels	3B	NYM	FLA
69	Monty Fariss	OF	TEX	FLA
71	Jeff Tabaka	LHP	MIL	FLA

=== Post-expansion draft transactions ===
- November 17, 1992: Eric Helfand and a player to be named later were traded by the Marlins to the Oakland Athletics for Walt Weiss. The Marlins completed the deal by sending Scott Baker to the Athletics on November 20.
- November 17, 1992: Greg Hibbard was traded to the Chicago Cubs for Alex Arias and Gary Scott.
- November 17, 1992: Danny Jackson was traded to the Philadelphia Phillies for Joel Adamson and Matt Whisenant.
- December 8, 1992: Charlie Hough was signed as a free agent by the Marlins.
- December 9, 1992: Terry McGriff was signed as a free agent with the Florida Marlins.
- February 20, 1993: Rick Renteria was signed as a free agent by the Marlins.

=== 1992 MLB June amateur draft and minor league affiliates ===
The Marlins and Colorado Rockies, set to debut in 1993, were allowed to participate in all rounds of the June 1992 MLB first-year player draft. The Marlins selected 28th overall in the first round, with catcher Charles Johnson their top (and most successful) pick. Of the 50 amateur free agents selected, only one other, pitcher Andy Larkin, reached the major leagues. The Marlins affiliated with two minor league clubs during 1992 to develop drafted players.

==== 1992 farm system ====
Level	Team	League	Manager
A-Short Season	Erie Sailors	New York–Penn League	Fredi González
Rookie	GCL Marlins	Gulf Coast League	Carlos Tosca

== Regular season ==
Due to the summer heat, the Marlins played in only 35 day games, the fewest in the majors.

=== 1993 Opening Day lineup ===
Player	Position
Scott Pose	CF
Bret Barberie	2B
Junior Félix	RF
Orestes Destrade	1B
Dave Magadan	3B
Benito Santiago	C
Jeff Conine	LF
Walt Weiss	SS
Charlie Hough	P

=== Season standings ===
NL East
Team	W	L	Pct.	GB	Home	Road
Philadelphia Phillies	97	65	.599	—	52‍–‍29	45‍–‍36
Montreal Expos	94	68	.580	3	55‍–‍26	39‍–‍42
St. Louis Cardinals	87	75	.537	10	49‍–‍32	38‍–‍43
Chicago Cubs	84	78	.519	13	43‍–‍38	41‍–‍40
Pittsburgh Pirates	75	87	.463	22	40‍–‍41	35‍–‍46
Florida Marlins	64	98	.395	33	35‍–‍46	29‍–‍52
New York Mets	59	103	.364	38	28‍–‍53	31‍–‍50

=== Record vs. opponents ===
1993 National League record Source: MLB Standings Grid – 1993
Team	ATL	CHC	CIN	COL	FLA	HOU	LAD	MON	NYM	PHI	PIT	SD	SF	STL
Atlanta	—	7–5	10–3	13–0	7–5	8–5	8–5	7–5	9–3	6–6	7–5	9–4	7–6	6–6
Chicago	5–7	—	7–5	8–4	6–7	4–8	7–5	5–8–1	8–5	7–6	5–8	8–4	6–6	8–5
Cincinnati	3–10	5–7	—	9–4	7–5	6–7	5–8	4–8	6–6	4–8	8–4	9–4	2–11	5–7
Colorado	0–13	4–8	4–9	—	7–5	11–2	7–6	3–9	6–6	3–9	8–4	6–7	3–10	5–7
Florida	5–7	7–6	5–7	5–7	—	3–9	5–7	5–8	4–9	4–9	6–7	7–5	4–8	4–9
Houston	5–8	8–4	7–6	2–11	9–3	—	9–4	5–7	11–1	5–7	7–5	8–5	3–10	6–6
Los Angeles	5–8	5–7	8–5	6–7	7–5	4–9	—	6–6	8–4	2–10	8–4	9–4	7–6	6–6
Montreal	5–7	8–5–1	8–4	9–3	8–5	7–5	6–6	—	9–4	6–7	8–5	10–2	3–9	7–6
New York	3–9	5–8	6–6	6–6	9–4	1–11	4–8	4–9	—	3–10	4–9	5–7	4–8	5–8
Philadelphia	6-6	6–7	8–4	9–3	9–4	7–5	10–2	7–6	10–3	—	7–6	6–6	4–8	8–5
Pittsburgh	5–7	8–5	4–8	4–8	7–6	5–7	4–8	5–8	9–4	6–7	—	9–3	5–7	4–9
San Diego	4–9	4–8	4–9	7–6	5–7	5–8	4–9	2–10	7–5	6–6	3–9	—	3–10	7–5
San Francisco	6–7	6–6	11–2	10–3	8–4	10–3	6–7	9–3	8–4	8–4	7–5	10–3	—	4–8
St. Louis	6–6	5–8	7–5	7–5	9–4	6–6	6–6	6–7	8–5	5–8	9–4	5–7	8–4	—

=== Notable transactions ===
- May 22, 1993: Kevin Elster was signed as a free agent with the Florida Marlins.
- June 4, 1993: Kevin Elster was released by the Florida Marlins.
- June 9, 1993: Mike Jeffcoat was signed as a free agent with the Florida Marlins.
- June 24, 1993: Gary Sheffield was traded by the San Diego Padres with Rich Rodriguez to the Florida Marlins for Trevor Hoffman, José Martínez, and Andrés Berumen.
- June 27, 1993: Henry Cotto was traded by the Seattle Mariners with Jeff Darwin to the Florida Marlins for Dave Magadan.

=== Roster ===
1993 Florida Marlins
**Roster**
**Pitchers**: 27 Luis Aquino; 77 Jack Armstrong; 46 Ryan Bowen; 44 Cris Carpenter; 41 Jim Corsi; 38,11 Chris Hammond; 34 Bryan Harvey; 51 Trevor Hoffman; 49 Charlie Hough; 40 John Johnstone; 58 Joe Klink; 26,24 Richie Lewis; 10 Bob McClure; 31 Robb Nen; 48 Pat Rapp; 42 Rich Rodriguez; 54 Matt Turner; 35 David Weathers	**Catchers**: 55 Steve Decker; 52 Mitch Lyden; 50 Terry McGriff; 13 Bob Natal; 09 Benito Santiago; **Infielders**: 24,26 Alex Arias; 8 Bret Barberie; 39 Orestes Destrade; 18 Dave Magadan; 14 Gus Polidor; 6 Rick Renteria; 10 Gary Sheffield; 22 Walt Weiss	**Outfielders**: 16 Gerónimo Berroa; 20 Greg Briley; 21 Chuck Carr; 25 Matias Carrillo; 19 Jeff Conine; 29 Henry Cotto; 3 Carl Everett; 4 Monty Fariss; 47 Junior Félix; 2 Scott Pose; 17 Darrell Whitmore; 30 Nigel Wilson	**Manager**: 15 Rene Lachemann; **Coaches**: 53 Marcel Lachemann (Pitching); 28 Vada Pinson (1st Base); 12 Doug Rader (Hitting); 33 Frank Reberger (Bullpen); 1 Cookie Rojas (3rd Base)

=== Game log ===
1993 Game Log: 64–98 (Home 35–46, Road 29–52)
April: 10–13 (Home 3–7, Road 7–6)

#	Date	Opponent	Score	Win	Loss	Save	Stadium	Attendance	Record	Streak
1	April 5	Dodgers	6–3	**Hough** (1–0)	Hershiser (0–1)	**Harvey** (1)	Joe Robbie Stadium	42,334	1–0	W1
2	April 6	Dodgers	2–4	Martínez (1–0)	**Armstrong** (0–1)	Worrell (1)	Joe Robbie Stadium	42,689	1–1	L1
3	April 7	Dodgers	2–4	Gross (1–0)	**Hammond** (0–1)	McDowell (1)	Joe Robbie Stadium	41,552	1–2	L2
4	April 9	Padres	1–2	Harris (1–0)	**Harvey** (0–1)	–	Joe Robbie Stadium	41,938	1–3	L3
5	April 10	Padres	2–1	**Hough** (2–0)	Eiland (0–1)	**Harvey** (2)	Joe Robbie Stadium	43,021	2–3	W1
6	April 11	Padres	2–6	Benes (1–1)	**Armstrong** (0–2)	Harris (1)	Joe Robbie Stadium	43,021	2–4	W1
7	April 12	@ Giants	3–4	Beck (1–1)	**Klink** (0–2)	–	Candlestick Park	56,689	2–5	L1
8	April 13	@ Giants	1–3	Burba (2–0)	**Aquino** (0–1)	Beck (3)	Candlestick Park	23,631	2–6	L2
9	April 14	@ Giants	6–4	**Bowen** (1–0)	Swift (0–1)	**Harvey** (3)	Candlestick Park	17,523	3–6	W1
10	April 16	@ Astros	3–9	Swindell (2–1)	**Hough** (2–1)	–	Astrodome	34,579	3–7	L1
11	April 17	@ Astros	9–4	**Armstrong** (1–2)	Williams (1–1)	–	Astrodome	29,459	4–7	W1
12	April 18	@ Astros	0–3	Harnisch (1–0)	**Hammond** (0–2)	Jones (2)	Astrodome	22,702	4–8	L1
13	April 20	Braves	4–5	Maddux (2–1)	**Bowen** (1–1)	Stanton (6)	Joe Robbie Stadium	43,458	4–9	L2
14	April 21	Braves	4–7	Smoltz (2–2)	**McClure** (0–1)	Stanton (7)	Joe Robbie Stadium	44,150	4–10	L3
15	April 22	Braves	4–3	**Armstrong** (2–2)	Avery (1–2)	**Harvey** (4)	Joe Robbie Stadium	40,620	5–10	W1
16	April 23	@ Rockies	4–5	Reed (1–0)	**Hammond** (0–3)	Holmes (1)	Mile High Stadium	57,784	5–11	L1
17	April 24	@ Rockies	2–1	**Aquino** (1–1)	Ashby (0–1)	**Harvey** (5)	Mile High Stadium	58,263	6–11	W1
18	April 25	@ Rockies	11–1	**Bowen** (2–1)	Smith (1–3)	–	Mile High Stadium	71,192	7–11	W2
19	April 26	@ Reds	0–3	Rijo (2–1)	**Hough** (2–2)	Reardon (1)	Riverfront Stadium	30,623	7–12	L1
20	April 27	@ Reds	4–3	**Hoffman** (1–0)	Ayala (0–1)	**Harvey** (6)	Riverfront Stadium	23,807	8–12	W1
21	April 28	@ Braves	3–1	**McClure** (1–1)	Bedrosian (0–2)	**Harvey** (7)	Atlanta-Fulton County Stadium	41,395	9–12	W2
22	April 29	@ Braves	6–5	**Aquino** (2–1)	Smith (2–2)	**Hoffman** (1)	Atlanta-Fulton County Stadium	49,221	10–12	W3
23	April 30	Rockies	2–6	Reynoso (1–0)	**Bowen** (2–1)	–	Joe Robbie Stadium	42,535	10–13	L1

May: 11–15 (Home 6–7, Road 5–8)

#	Date	Opponent	Score	Win	Loss	Save	Location	Attendance	Record	Streak

June: 13–14 (Home 8–7, Road 5–7)

#	Date	Opponent	Score	Win	Loss	Save	Location	Attendance	Record	Streak

July: 9–18 (Home 6–5, Road 3–13)

#	Date	Opponent	Score	Win	Loss	Save	Location	Attendance	Record	Streak

August: 12–16 (Home 8–6, Road 4–10)

#	Date	Opponent	Score	Win	Loss	Save	Location	Attendance	Record	Streak

September: 9–19 (Home 4–11, Road 5–8)

#	Date	Opponent	Score	Win	Loss	Save	Location	Attendance	Record	Streak

October: 0–3 (Home 0–3, Road 0–0)

#	Date	Opponent	Score	Win	Loss	Save	Location	Attendance	Record	Streak

Legend: = Win = Loss = Postponement
Bold = Marlins team member

== Player stats ==
= Indicates team leader

= Indicates league leader

=== Batting ===
==== Starters by position ====
Note: Pos = Position; G = Games played; AB = At bats; H = Hits; Avg. = Batting average; HR = Home runs; RBI = Runs batted in; SB = Stolen Bases

Pos	Player	G	AB	H	Avg.	HR	RBI	SB
C	Benito Santiago	139	469	108	.230	13	50	10
1B	Orestes Destrade	153	568	145	.255	20	87	0
2B	Bret Barberie	99	375	104	.277	5	33	2
3B	Gary Sheffield	72	236	69	.292	10	37	12
SS	Walt Weiss	158	500	133	.266	1	39	7
LF	Jeff Conine	162	595	174	.292	12	79	2
CF	Chuck Carr	142	551	147	.267	4	41	58
RF	Darrell Whitmore	76	250	51	.201	4	19	4

==== Other batters ====
Note: G = Games played; AB = At bats; H = Hits; Avg. = Batting average; HR = Home runs; RBI = Runs batted in

Player	G	AB	H	Avg.	HR	RBI
Rick Renteria	103	263	67	.255	2	30
Alex Arias	96	249	67	.269	2	20
Dave Magadan	66	227	65	.286	4	29
Junior Félix	57	214	51	.238	7	22
Greg Briley	120	170	33	.194	3	12
Henry Cotto	54	135	40	.296	3	14
Bob Natal	41	117	25	.214	1	6
Matias Carrillo	24	55	14	.255	0	3
Scott Pose	15	41	8	.195	0	3
Gerónimo Berroa	14	34	4	.118	0	0
Monty Fariss	18	29	5	.172	0	2
Carl Everett	11	19	2	.105	0	0
Nigel Wilson	7	16	0	.000	0	0
Steve Decker	8	15	0	.000	0	1
Mitch Lyden	6	10	3	.300	1	1
Terry McGriff	3	7	0	.000	0	0
Gus Polidor	7	6	1	.167	0	0

=== Pitching ===
==== Starting pitchers ====
Note: G = Games pitched; IP = Innings pitched; W = Wins; L = Losses; ERA = Earned run average; SO = Strikeouts

Player	G	IP	W	L	ERA	SO
Charlie Hough	34	204.1	9	16	4.27	126
Jack Armstrong	36	196.1	9	17	4.49	118
Chris Hammond	32	191.0	11	12	4.66	108
Ryan Bowen	27	156.2	8	12	4.42	98
Pat Rapp	16	94.0	4	6	4.02	57

==== Other pitchers ====
Note: G = Games pitched; IP = Innings pitched; W = Wins; L = Losses; ERA = Earned run average; SO = Strikeouts

Player	G	IP	W	L	ERA	SO
Luis Aquino	38	110.2	6	8	3.42	67
Dave Weathers	14	45.2	2	3	5.12	34

==== Relief pitchers ====
Note: G = Games pitched; W = Wins; L = Losses; SV = Saves; ERA = Earned run average; SO = Strikeouts

Player	G	W	L	SV	ERA	SO
Bryan Harvey	59	1	5	45	1.70	73
Joe Klink	59	0	2	0	5.02	22
Richie Lewis	57	6	3	0	3.26	65
Matt Turner	55	4	5	0	2.91	59
Rich Rodriguez	36	0	1	1	4.11	21
Cris Carpenter	29	0	1	0	2.89	26
Trevor Hoffman	28	2	2	2	3.28	26
Jim Corsi	15	0	2	0	6.64	7
Robb Nen	15	1	0	0	7.02	27
Bob McClure	14	1	1	0	7.11	6
John Johnstone	7	0	2	0	5.91	5

== Awards and honors ==
=== All-Stars ===
MLB All-Star Game

- Gary Sheffield, starter
- Bryan Harvey, reserve

=== Team leaders ===
- Games – Jeff Conine (162)
- At bats – Jeff Conine (595)
- Home runs – Orestes Destrade (20)
- Runs batted in – Orestes Destrade (87)
- Batting average – Jeff Conine (.292)
- Slugging percentage – Orestes Destrade (.406)
- On-base percentage – Walt Weiss (.367)
- Hits – Jeff Conine (174)
- Doubles – Jeff Conine (24)
- Triples – Benito Santiago (6)
- Walks – Walt Weiss (79)
- Hit by pitch – Bret Barberie (7)
- Stolen bases – Chuck Carr (58)
- Wins – Chris Hammond (11)
- Innings pitched – Charlie Hough (204.1)
- Earned run average – Charlie Hough (4.27)
- Strikeouts – Charlie Hough (126)

== Farm system ==
Level	Team	League	Manager
AAA	Edmonton Trappers	Pacific Coast League	Sal Rende
A	High Desert Mavericks	California League	Fredi González
A	Kane County Cougars	Midwest League	Carlos Tosca
A-Short Season	Elmira Pioneers	New York–Penn League	Lynn Jones
Rookie	GCL Marlins	Gulf Coast League	Jim Hendry

LEAGUE CHAMPIONS: High Desert
