= 1987 Major League Baseball draft =

Baseball draft of amateur players by Major League Baseball

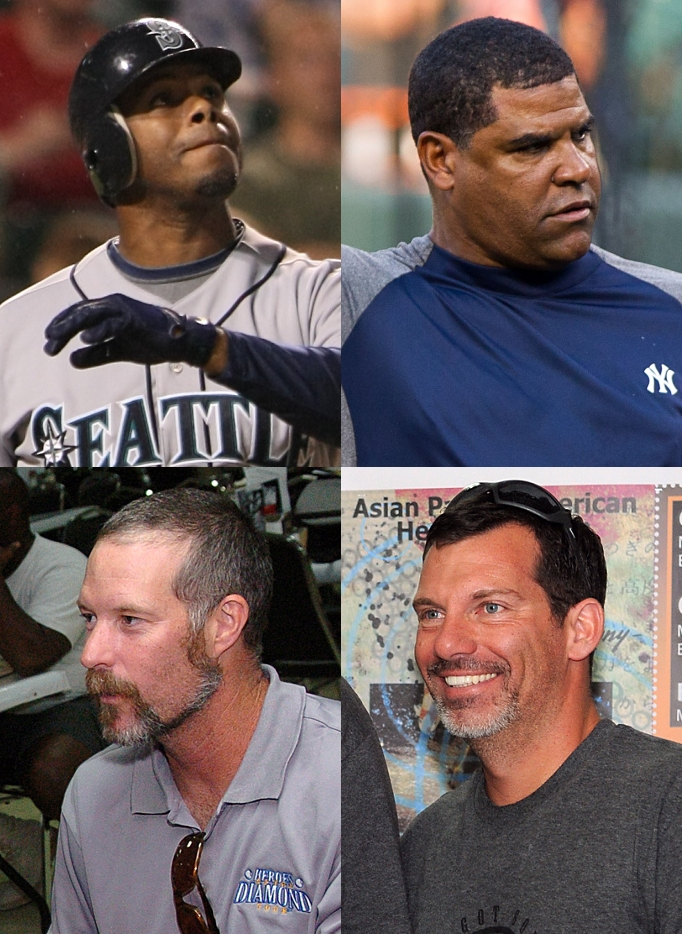
- First-round selections Ken Griffey Jr. (top left), Mike Harkey (top right), Jack McDowell (bottom left), and Mike Remlinger (bottom right).

General information
- Date: June 2–4, 1987
- Location: Commissioner's office, New York
- Network: none

Overview
- 1,263 total selections
- First selection: Ken Griffey Jr. Seattle Mariners
- First round selections: 32
- Hall of Famers: 3: CF Ken Griffey Jr.; OF Craig Biggio; P Mike Mussina

The 1987 Major League Baseball draft is the process by which Major League Baseball (MLB) teams select athletes to play for their organization. High school seniors, college juniors and seniors, and anyone who had never played under a professional contract were considered eligible for the draft. The 1987 MLB Draft took place as a conference call to the Commissioner of Baseball's office in New York from June 2–4. As opposed to the National Football League draft which appeared on ESPN, no network aired the MLB Draft.

The American League (AL) and the National League (NL) alternated picks throughout the first round; because an NL team drafted first in the 1986 MLB draft, an AL team had the first selection in 1987. Having finished 67–95 in 1986, the Seattle Mariners had the worst record in the AL and thus obtained the first overall selection. The second selection went to the Pittsburgh Pirates, who had the worst record in the NL.

With the first overall pick, the Mariners drafted Ken Griffey Jr. from Moeller High School. Griffey Jr. became a 13-time All-Star and helped Seattle make its first postseason appearance in franchise history. Mark Merchant, the second overall pick, however, never played in a major league game. Two years after he was drafted, the Pirates traded Merchant to Seattle, where he got to meet Ken Griffey Jr. Chicago White Sox' first overall selection Jack McDowell won the 1993 Cy Young Award as Chicago made a League Championship Series appearance that year. The total number of athletes drafted, 1,263, broke a record for the most players ever chosen in a draft. In total, 27 All-Stars were selected in 1987, although not all signed a professional contract. As of 2020, only three players from the draft has been elected to the National Baseball Hall of Fame– Craig Biggio, Griffey Jr, and Mike Mussina, though Mussina did not sign in this draft.

== Background ==
As with prior drafts, the team with the worst overall record from the previous season was selected first, with teams from the AL and NL alternating picks. If two or more teams had the same record, the team with the worse record from two seasons prior would draft higher. Because the Pittsburgh Pirates of the NL were selected first overall in 1986 Major League Baseball draft, an AL team had the first pick in the 1987 draft. The final two selections in the first round both came from American League teams, as the AL had two more organizations than the NL.

The date of the draft was set for June 2–4, and would occur as a conference call to the Commissioner of Baseball's office in New York. Unlike the 1987 NFL draft, which aired on ESPN, no network televised the MLB draft. High school seniors, college juniors and seniors, and anyone who had never played under a professional contract were considered eligible to be drafted. For the first time, junior college players would also be included in the June draft; in years past, teams would select junior college players in a separate draft.

Selections could be transferred or added if a team signed a certain type of free agent: the Elias Sports Bureau ranked players as either type-A (top 30 percent of all players), type-B (31 percent to 50 percent), or type-C (51 percent to 60 percent), based on the athlete's performance over the past two seasons. If a "type-A" player became a free agent, the team that lost the type-A player would receive the first-round draft pick from the team that signed the player, as well as a "sandwich pick" between the first and second rounds. If a "type-B" became a free agent, the team that lost him would receive a second-round pick from the team that signed the player. If a "type-C" became a free agent, the team that lost him would receive a compensation pick between the second and third rounds. The top 13 selections were considered "protected picks" and exempt from this rule.

With a record of 67–95, the Seattle Mariners ended the 1986 Major League Baseball season with the worst record in the AL and thus obtained the first overall selection. The Mariners never had a winning record in the twelve years since the franchise's creation (their best winning percentage was .469, accomplished in 1982), and during the 1986 season, changed managers three times. In the NL, the Pirates finished with the league's worst record for the second year in a row and were given the second overall pick. The 1986 World Series champion New York Mets drafted third-to-last, with the runner-up Boston Red Sox selecting last.

== First two rounds ==
Table key
*	Did not sign with team
^{§}	All-Star
^{†§}	Hall-of-Fame inductee and All-Star

Draft
Round	Pick	Player	Selected by	Position	School
1	1	Ken Griffey Jr.^{†§}	Seattle Mariners	Outfielder	Moeller High School (OH)
1	2	Mark Merchant	Pittsburgh Pirates	Outfielder	Oviedo High School (FL)
1	3	Willie Banks	Minnesota Twins	Right-handed pitcher	St. Anthony High School (NJ)
1	4	Mike Harkey	Chicago Cubs	Right-handed pitcher	Cal State Fullerton
1	5	Jack McDowell^{§}	Chicago White Sox	Right-handed pitcher	Stanford
1	6	Derek Lilliquist	Atlanta Braves	Left-handed pitcher	Georgia
1	7	Chris Myers	Baltimore Orioles	Left-handed pitcher	Plant High School (FL)
1	8	Dan Opperman	Los Angeles Dodgers	Right-handed pitcher	Valley High School (NV)
1	9	Kevin Appier^{§}	Kansas City Royals	Right-handed pitcher	Antelope Valley College
1	10	Kevin Garner	San Diego Padres	Right-handed pitcher	Texas
1	11	Lee Tinsley	Oakland Athletics	Outfielder	Shelby County High School (KY)
1	12	Delino DeShields	Montreal Expos	Shortstop	Seaford Senior High School
1	13	Bill Spiers	Milwaukee Brewers	Shortstop	Clemson
1	14	Cris Carpenter	St. Louis Cardinals	Right-handed pitcher	Georgia
1	15	Brad Duvall* (Note: The Baltimore Orioles received the Cleveland Indians' first-round draft pick and a first-round sandwich pick for the loss of type-A free agent Rick Dempsey.)	Baltimore Orioles	Right-handed pitcher	Virginia Tech
1	16	Mike Remlinger^{§}	San Francisco Giants	Left-handed pitcher	Dartmouth
1	17	Alex Sanchez	Toronto Blue Jays	Right-handed pitcher	UCLA
1	18	Jack Armstrong^{§}	Cincinnati Reds	Right-handed pitcher	Oklahoma
1	19	Brian Bohanon	Texas Rangers	Left-handed pitcher	North Shore High School (TX)
1	20	Bill Henderson (Note: The Detroit Tigers received the Philadelphia Phillies' first-round draft pick and a first-round sandwich pick for the loss of type-A free agent Lance Parrish.)	Detroit Tigers	Catcher	Westminster Christian School (FL)
1	21	Steve Pegues	Detroit Tigers	Outfielder	Pontotoc High School
1	22	Craig Biggio^{†§}	Houston Astros	Catcher	Seton Hall
1	23	Bill Haselman (Note: The Texas Rangers received the New York Yankees' first-round draft pick and a first-round sandwich pick for the loss of type-A free agent Gary Ward.)	Texas Rangers	Catcher	University of California, Los Angeles
1	24	Chris Donnels	New York Mets	Third baseman	Loyola Marymount
1	25	John Orton	California Angels	Catcher	Cal Poly
1	26	Reggie Harris	Boston Red Sox	Right-handed pitcher	Waynesboro High School
1 (supplemental)	27	Pete Harnisch^{§}	Baltimore Orioles	Right-handed pitcher	Fordham
1 (supplemental)	28	Tyrone Kingwood (Note: The Montreal Expos received a first-round sandwich pick and the Chicago Cubs' second-round pick for the loss of type-A free agent Andre Dawson. Normally, the Cubs would have to forfeit their first-round pick to the Expos; however, since the Cubs had a top-13 draft choice, the team only had to forfeit their second-round selection.)	Montreal Expos	Outfielder	Imperial Valley College
1 (supplemental)	29	Mark Petkovsek	Texas Rangers	Right-handed pitcher	Texas
1 (supplemental)	30	Travis Fryman^{§}	Detroit Tigers	Shortstop	J. M. Tate High School
1 (supplemental)	31	David Holdridge (Note: The California Angels received a first-round sandwich pick and the Oakland Athletics' second-round pick for the loss of type-A free agent Reggie Jackson. Normally, the Athletics would have to forfeit their first-round pick to the Angels; however, since the Athletics had a top-13 draft choice, the team only had to forfeit their second-round selection.)	California Angels	Right-handed pitcher	Ocean View High School
1 (supplemental)	32	Bob Zupcic (Note: The Boston Red Sox received a first-round sandwich pick because they failed to sign their 1986 first round selection, Greg McMurtry.)	Boston Red Sox	Outfielder	Oral Roberts
2	33	Dave Burba	Seattle Mariners	Right-handed pitcher	Ohio State
2	34	Ben Shelton	Pittsburgh Pirates	Left-handed pitcher	Oak Park and River Forest High School
2	35	Terry Jorgensen	Minnesota Twins	Outfielder	Wisconsin-Oshkosh
2	36	Nate Minchey	Montreal Expos	Right-handed pitcher	Pflugerville High School
2	37	Brent Knackert	Chicago White Sox	Right-handed pitcher	Ocean View High School
2	38	Mike Urman	Atlanta Braves	Catcher	Canoga Park High School
2	39	Todd Hundley^{§} (Note: The New York Mets received a second-round draft pick from the Baltimore Orioles for the loss of type-B free agent Ray Knight.)	New York Mets	Catcher	William Fremd High School
2	40	Donald Carroll	Los Angeles Dodgers	Outfielder	Granite Hills High School (CA)
2	41	Terry Shumpert	Kansas City Royals	Second baseman	Kentucky
2	42	Roger Smithberg	San Diego Padres	Right-handed pitcher	Bradley
2	43	Mike Erb	California Angels	Right-handed pitcher	San Diego State
2	44	Richie Lewis	Montreal Expos	Right-handed pitcher	Florida State
2	45	Chris Johnson	Milwaukee Brewers	Right-handed pitcher	Red Bank High School
2	46	Jeremy Hernandez	St. Louis Cardinals	Right-handed pitcher	CSU Northridge
2	47	Albert Belle^{§}	Cleveland Indians	Outfielder	LSU
2	48	Eric Gunderson	San Francisco Giants	Left-handed pitcher	Portland State
2	49	Derek Bell	Toronto Blue Jays	Outfielder	C. Leon King High School
2	50	Freddie Benavides	Cincinnati Reds	Shortstop	TCU
2	51	Barry Manuel	Texas Rangers	Right-handed pitcher	LSU
2	52	Matt Rambo	Philadelphia Phillies	Left-handed pitcher	Plano High School (TX)
2	53	Rob Richie	Detroit Tigers	Outfielder	Nevada
2	54	Randy Hennis	Houston Astros	Right-handed pitcher	UCLA
2	55	Curt Krippner (Note: The Milwaukee Brewers received a second-round draft pick from the New York Yankees for the loss of type-B free agent Rick Cerone.)	Milwaukee Brewers	Right-handed pitcher	Texas
2	56	Pete Schourek	New York Mets	Left-handed pitcher	George C. Marshall High School
2	57	Kevin Flora	California Angels	Shortstop	Bonita High School
2	58	Paul Brown	Boston Red Sox	Left-handed pitcher	Hawaii

== Other players to reach MLB ==
The following players were drafted outside of the first two rounds and played in at least one major league game:

Draft
Round	Pick	Player	Selected by	Position	School
3	60	Brian Williams*	Pittsburgh Pirates	Shortstop	Lewisville High School
3	62	Alex Arias	Chicago Cubs	Third baseman	George Washington High School
3	65	Anthony Telford	Baltimore Orioles	Right-handed pitcher	San Jose State University
3	66	Chris Nichting	Los Angeles Dodgers	Right-handed pitcher	Northwestern University
3	67	Stu Cole	Kansas City Royals	Shortstop	University of North Carolina at Charlotte
3	69	Scott Livingstone*	Oakland Athletics	Third baseman	Texas A&M University
3	70	John Vander Wal	Montreal Expos	Outfielder	Western Michigan University
3	71	Jaime Navarro	Milwaukee Brewers	Right-handed pitcher	Miami Dade College
3	72	Ray Lankford^{§}	St. Louis Cardinals	Outfielder	Modesto Junior College
3	74	Mike Benjamin	San Francisco Giants	Shortstop	Arizona State University
3	77	Scott Coolbaugh	Texas Rangers	Third baseman	University of Texas at Austin
3	78	Kim Batiste	Philadelphia Phillies	Shortstop	St. Amant High School
4	86	Wes Chamberlain	Pittsburgh Pirates	Outfielder	Jackson State University
4	89	Steve Schrenk	Chicago White Sox	Right-handed pitcher	North Marion High School
4	90	Keith Mitchell	Atlanta Braves	Outfielder	Lincoln High School
4	91	Chuck Ricci	Baltimore Orioles	Right-handed pitcher	Shawnee High School
4	95	Scott Chiamparino	Oakland Athletics	Right-handed pitcher	Santa Clara University
4	98	Mike Ignasiak*	St. Louis Cardinals	Right-handed pitcher	University of Michigan
4	103	Jonathan Hurst	Texas Rangers	Right-handed pitcher	Spartanburg Methodist College
4	104	Ricky Trlicek	Philadelphia Phillies	Right-handed pitcher	La Grange High School
4	105	Riccardo Ingram	Detroit Tigers	Outfielder	Georgia Institute of Technology
4	109	Mark Holzemer	California Angels	Left-handed pitcher	Mullen High School
5	115	Dan Rohrmeier	Chicago White Sox	Third baseman	St. Thomas University
5	122	Archi Cianfrocco	Montreal Expos	Shortstop	Purdue University
5	123	Steve Sparks	Milwaukee Brewers	Right-handed pitcher	Sam Houston State University
5	124	Rod Brewer	St. Louis Cardinals	First baseman	University of Florida
5	125	Tom Kramer	Cleveland Indians	Right-handed pitcher	Roger Bacon High School
5	127	Mike Timlin	Toronto Blue Jays	Right-handed pitcher	Southwestern University
5	129	Terry Mathews	Texas Rangers	Right-handed pitcher	University of Louisiana at Monroe
5	131	Torey Lovullo	Detroit Tigers	Second baseman	University of California, Los Angeles
6	137	Joe Slusarski*	Seattle Mariners	Right-handed pitcher	University of New Orleans
6	139	Larry Casian	Minnesota Twins	Left-handed pitcher	California State University, Fullerton
6	140	Frank Castillo	Chicago Cubs	Right-handed pitcher	Eastwood High School
6	141	Jerry Kutzler	Chicago White Sox	Right-handed pitcher	William Penn University
6	144	Darrin Fletcher^{§}	Los Angeles Dodgers	Catcher	University of Illinois at Urbana–Champaign
6	146	Dave Hollins^{§}	San Diego Padres	Third baseman	University of South Carolina
6	148	Greg Colbrunn	Montreal Expos	Third baseman	Fontana High School
6	149	Charlie Montoyo	Milwaukee Brewers	Second baseman	Louisiana Tech University
6	155	Kevin Belcher	Texas Rangers	Outfielder	Navarro College
6	156	Doug Lindsey	Philadelphia Phillies	Catcher	Seminole State College of Florida
7	164	Mickey Morandini^{§}*	Pittsburgh Pirates	Shortstop	Indiana University Bloomington
7	165	Mark Guthrie	Minnesota Twins	Left-handed pitcher	Louisiana State University
7	166	Matt Franco	Chicago Cubs	Third baseman	Westlake High School
7	170	Tony Barron	Los Angeles Dodgers	Third baseman	Willamette University
7	174	Howard Farmer	Montreal Expos	Right-handed pitcher	Jackson State University
7	180	Reggie Sanders^{§}	Cincinnati Reds	Shortstop	Spartanburg Methodist College
7	181	Tony Scruggs	Texas Rangers	Outfielder	University of California, Los Angeles
7	182	Donnie Elliott	Philadelphia Phillies	Right-handed pitcher	Deer Park High School
7	185	Dave Eiland	New York Yankees	Right-handed pitcher	University of South Florida
8	189	Eric Helfand*	Seattle Mariners	Catcher	Patrick Henry High School
8	190	Kurt Knudsen*	Pittsburgh Pirates	Right-handed pitcher	American River College
8	192	Matt Walbeck	Chicago Cubs	Catcher	Sacramento Charter High School
8	194	Brian Hunter	Atlanta Braves	First baseman	Cerritos College
8	198	Marty Cordova*	San Diego Padres	Shortstop	Bishop Gorman High School
8	206	Jimmy Kremers*	Cincinnati Reds	Third baseman	University of Arkansas
8	209	Derek Lee*	Detroit Tigers	Infielder	University of South Florida
8	212	Tim Bogar	New York Mets	Shortstop	Eastern Illinois University
8	214	Jim Byrd	Boston Red Sox	Shortstop	Seminole State College of Florida
9	221	Jack Voigt	Baltimore Orioles	Outfielder	Louisiana State University
9	226	Donovan Osborne*	Montreal Expos	Left-handed pitcher	Carson High School
9	227	Frank Bolick	Milwaukee Brewers	Third baseman	Georgia Institute of Technology
9	230	Gil Heredia	San Francisco Giants	Right-handed pitcher	University of Arizona
9	231	Kevin King*	Toronto Blue Jays	Left-handed pitcher	Braggs High School
9	233	Bert Heffernan*	Texas Rangers	Catcher	Clemson University
9	238	Pat Howell	New York Mets	Outfielder	Vigor High School
10	245	Rob Lukachyk	Chicago White Sox	Shortstop	Brookdale Community College
10	255	Ever Magallanes	Cleveland Indians	Shortstop	Texas A&M University
10	257	Darrell Whitmore*	Toronto Blue Jays	Shortstop	Warren County High School
10	266	Jeff Plympton	Boston Red Sox	Right-handed pitcher	University of Maine
11	273	Mike Mussina^{§}*	Baltimore Orioles	Right-handed pitcher	Montoursville High School
11	275	Kevin McGehee*	Kansas City Royals	Outfielder	William R. Boone High School
11	277	Jerry Nielsen*	Oakland Athletics	Left-handed pitcher	Florida State University
11	291	Rubén Amaro Jr.	California Angels	Outfielder	Stanford University
11	292	Phil Plantier	Boston Red Sox	Third baseman	Poway High School
12	295	Shawn Gilbert	Minnesota Twins	Shortstop	California State University, Fresno
12	297	Buddy Groom	Chicago White Sox	Left-handed pitcher	University of Mary Hardin–Baylor
12	314	Andy Mota	Houston Astros	Infielder	California State University, Fullerton
13	323	Dwayne Hosey	Chicago White Sox	Outfielder	—
13	324	Mike Stanton^{§}	Atlanta Braves	Left-handed pitcher	Alvin Community College
13	325	Steve Finley^{§}	Baltimore Orioles	Outfielder	Southern Illinois University Carbondale
13	330	Rob Natal	Montreal Expos	Catcher	University of California, San Diego
13	331	Troy O'Leary	Milwaukee Brewers	Outfielder	Cypress High School
13	335	Ryan Thompson	Toronto Blue Jays	Outfielder	Kent County High School
13	342	Terry Bross	New York Mets	Right-handed pitcher	St. John's University
14	350	David Nied	Atlanta Braves	Right-handed pitcher	Duncanville High School
14	355	Ron Coomer^{§}	Oakland Athletics	Third baseman	Taft College
14	362	Bill Risley	Cincinnati Reds	Right-handed pitcher	Harry S Truman College
14	367	Gerald Williams	New York Yankees	Outfielder	Grambling State University
15	388	Butch Henry	Cincinnati Reds	Left-handed pitcher	El Paso High School
15	396	Desi Wilson*	Boston Red Sox	First baseman	Glen Cove High School
16	405	Bobby Moore	Kansas City Royals	Outfielder	Eastern Kentucky University
16	411	Steve Olin	Cleveland Indians	Right-handed pitcher	Portland State University
16	418	Al Osuna	Houston Astros	Left-handed pitcher	Stanford University
16	420	Eric Hillman	New York Mets	Left-handed pitcher	Eastern Illinois University
17	424	Steve Carter	Pittsburgh Pirates	Outfielder	University of Georgia
17	425	Chip Hale	Minnesota Twins	Second baseman	University of Arizona
17	445	Terry Bradshaw*	New York Yankees	Shortstop	Windsor High School
18	449	Mike Gardiner	Seattle Mariners	Right-handed pitcher	Indiana State University
18	455	David Segui	Baltimore Orioles	First baseman	Louisiana Tech University
18	462	Tim Sherrill	St. Louis Cardinals	Left-handed pitcher	University of Arkansas
18	464	Erik Johnson	San Francisco Giants	Shortstop	University of California, Santa Barbara
18	465	Dave Haas*	Toronto Blue Jays	Right-handed pitcher	Wichita State University
18	472	Denny Harriger	New York Mets	Right-handed pitcher	Ford City High School
19	476	Mike Fyhrie*	Pittsburgh Pirates	Shortstop	Ocean View High School
19	482	Rafael Bournigal	Los Angeles Dodgers	Infielder	Florida State University
19	486	Jeff Carter	Montreal Expos	Right-handed pitcher	University of Tampa
19	491	Bob MacDonald	Toronto Blue Jays	Left-handed pitcher	Rutgers University
20	508	Jose Munoz	Los Angeles Dodgers	Shortstop	Florida College
20	511	Scott Brosius^{§}*	Oakland Athletics	Third baseman	Linfield College
20	513	Brian Turang*	Milwaukee Brewers	Catcher	Long Beach City College
20	520	Jim Vatcher	Philadelphia Phillies	Outfielder	California State University, Northridge
20	522	Dean Hartgraves	Houston Astros	Left-handed pitcher	College of the Siskiyous
20	524	John Johnstone	New York Mets	Right-handed pitcher	Bishop Ludden Junior/Senior High School
21	534	Dennis Springer	Los Angeles Dodgers	Right-handed pitcher	California State University, Fresno
21	539	Mark Kiefer	Milwaukee Brewers	Right-handed pitcher	Fullerton College
21	547	Mike Schwabe	Detroit Tigers	Right-handed pitcher	Arizona State University
22	555	Dan Smith*	Minnesota Twins	Left-handed pitcher	Apple Valley High School
22	559	Ray Giannelli*	Baltimore Orioles	Third baseman	New York City College of Technology
22	567	Kevin Bearse	Cleveland Indians	Left-handed pitcher	Old Dominion University
23	579	Pat Listach*	Seattle Mariners	Shortstop	McLennan Community College
23	588	Paul Faries	San Diego Padres	Shortstop	Pepperdine University
23	594	Mark Dewey	San Francisco Giants	Right-handed pitcher	Grand Valley State University
24	617	Jeromy Burnitz^{§}*	Milwaukee Brewers	Catcher	Conroe High School
24	621	Erik Schullstrom*	Toronto Blue Jays	Right-handed pitcher	Alameda High School
25	643	Chris Haney*	Milwaukee Brewers	Left-handed pitcher	Orange County High School
25	645	Beau Allred	Cleveland Indians	Outfielder	Lamar University
25	656	Jayhawk Owens*	Boston Red Sox	Catcher	Glen Este High School
26	658	Bob Ayrault	Pittsburgh Pirates	Right-handed pitcher	University of Nevada, Las Vegas
26	666	Alan Newman*	San Diego Padres	Left-handed pitcher	La Habra High School
26	680	Dan Wilson^{§}*	New York Mets	Catcher	Barrington High School
26	682	Stan Spencer*	Boston Red Sox	Right-handed pitcher	Columbia River High School
27	696	Toby Borland	Philadelphia Phillies	Right-handed pitcher	Quitman High School
28	711	Bret Boone^{§}*	Minnesota Twins	Shortstop	El Dorado High School
28	726	Milt Hill	Cincinnati Reds	Right-handed pitcher	Georgia Perimeter College
29	742	Zak Shinall	Los Angeles Dodgers	Right-handed pitcher	El Camino College
29	746	Kevin Foster	Montreal Expos	Third baseman	Evanston Township High School
30	777	Steve Wapnick	Toronto Blue Jays	Right-handed pitcher	California State University, Fresno
30	782	Darryl Kile^{§}	Houston Astros	Right-handed pitcher	Chaffey College
31	805	Kevin Mmahat	Texas Rangers	Left-handed pitcher	Tulane University
32	821	Jim Campbell	Kansas City Royals	Left-handed pitcher	San Diego State University
32	831	Rob Nen^{§}	Texas Rangers	Right-handed pitcher	Los Alamitos High School
33	841	Fernando Ramsey	Chicago Cubs	Outfielder	New Mexico State University
33	846	Jorge Pedre	Kansas City Royals	Catcher	Los Angeles Harbor College
33	858	Rusty Meacham	Detroit Tigers	Right-handed pitcher	Indian River State College
34	869	Kirk Dressendorfer*	Baltimore Orioles	Right-handed pitcher	Pearland High School
34	870	Jim Poole*	Los Angeles Dodgers	Left-handed pitcher	Georgia Institute of Technology
34	884	Scott Erickson^{§}*	Houston Astros	Right-handed pitcher	San Jose City College
35	902	Jimmy Myers	San Francisco Giants	Right-handed pitcher	Crowder High School
35	905	Ed Pierce*	Texas Rangers	Outfielder	Glendora High School
36	914	Craig Paquette*	Minnesota Twins	Third baseman	Rancho Alamitos High School
36	929	Greg McCarthy	Philadelphia Phillies	Left-handed pitcher	Central High School
37	938	Jeff Cirillo^{§}*	Chicago Cubs	Right-handed pitcher	Providence High School
37	952	Andy Carter	Philadelphia Phillies	Left-handed pitcher	Springfield High School
37	954	Lance Dickson*	Houston Astros	Left-handed pitcher	Grossmont High School
38	958	Todd Haney	Seattle Mariners	Second baseman	University of Texas at Austin
38	961	Tom Thobe	Chicago Cubs	Left-handed pitcher	Edison High School
38	978	Anthony Young	New York Mets	Right-handed pitcher	University of Houston
41	1,034	Tim Costo*	Cincinnati Reds	Shortstop	Glenbard Township High School
42	1,041	Gar Finnvold*	Seattle Mariners	Right-handed pitcher	Palm Beach State College
42	1,057	James Mouton*	New York Yankees	Shortstop	Luther Burbank High School
43	1,064	Mike James	Los Angeles Dodgers	Right-handed pitcher	Lurleen B. Wallace Community College
45	1,097	Doug Simons*	Los Angeles Dodgers	Left-handed pitcher	Pepperdine University
45	1,102	Darren Lewis*	Toronto Blue Jays	Outfielder	Chabot College
45	1,103	Glenn Sutko	Cincinnati Reds	Catcher	Spartanburg Methodist College
46	1,109	Jeff Darwin*	Seattle Mariners	Right-handed pitcher	Bonham High School
47	1,136	Keith Osik*	Texas Rangers	Shortstop	Shoreham-Wading River High School
48	1,152	Brad Ausmus^{§}	New York Yankees	Catcher	Cheshire High School
49	1,159	Tim Laker*	Kansas City Royals	Catcher	Simi Valley High School
52	1,190	James Hurst*	Seattle Mariners	Left-handed pitcher	South Florida State College
53	1,199	Paul Miller	Pittsburgh Pirates	Right-handed pitcher	Carthage College
57	1,223	Orlando Palmeiro*	Toronto Blue Jays	Outfielder	Miami Southridge High School
58	1,226	Jeff Conine^{§}*	Kansas City Royals	Third baseman	University of California, Los Angeles
59	1,230	Mark Small*	Kansas City Royals	Right-handed pitcher	West Seattle High School
65	1,247	Bret Barberie*	Kansas City Royals	Infielder	Cerritos College
66	1,249	Erik Plantenberg*	Kansas City Royals	Right-handed pitcher	Newport High School
70	1,258	Tom Marsh*	Toronto Blue Jays	Right-handed pitcher	University of Toledo

== Aftermath ==
The Kansas City Royals had the most picks of any team, with 74; following the Royals, the Toronto Blue Jays made 71, and the Cincinnati Reds and New York Mets made 61 apiece. The total number of players drafted, 1,263, broke a record for the most players ever selected in a draft. The previous record of 1,162 was set during the 1967 draft. The California Angels drafted the fewest future MLB players, with only four of their draftees appearing in an MLB game, while the Blue Jays and the Texas Rangers both drafted 13 future MLB players, the most of any team.

With their first overall pick, the Mariners selected Ken Griffey Jr., an outfielder from Moeller High School. Over his 22-year career, Griffey Jr. was elected to thirteen All-Star games, won seven Silver Slugger Awards, and helped Seattle make their first playoff appearance as a franchise during the 1995 season. Mark Merchant, whom the Pirates drafted second overall, never played in an MLB game; two years after they drafted him, Pittsburgh traded Merchant to Seattle. The Pirates made the playoffs for three consecutive seasons from 1990 to 1992 but lost in the National League Championship Series all three years.

== Notes ==
Preceded by Jeff King	1st Overall Pick; Ken Griffey Jr.	Succeeded by Andy Benes
