= Karie Ross =

American sports broadcaster

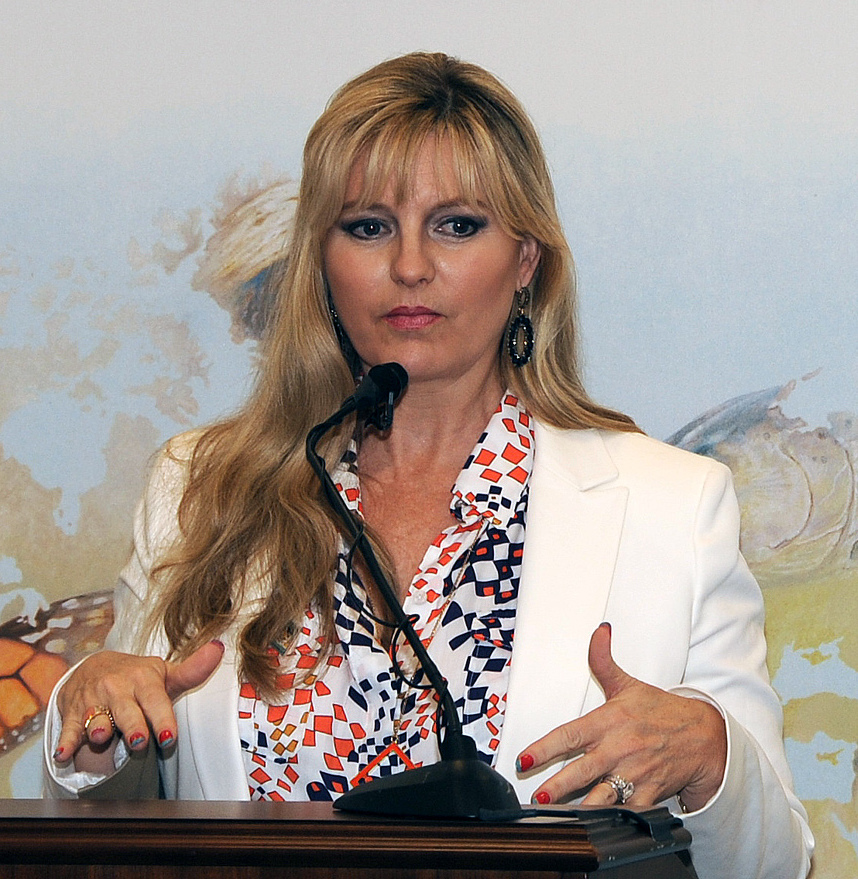
Dombrowski speaks about saving wildlife on Capitol Hill in 2013

Karie Dombrowski (née Ross) is an American former sports broadcaster. She worked as both a sports anchor and reporter for ABC, NBC and CBS network affiliates and as a cable television broadcast reporter. Ross was ESPN's third female on-air personality, and she was the first female reporter on ESPN’s College Football GameDay.

== Early life ==
Ross was born in Norman, Oklahoma, raised in Clinton, Oklahoma by her parents Lanny and Janet Ross. Ross attended Clinton High School where she served as the school newspaper's sports editor. She was a supporter of Oklahoma Sooners sports in many ways: a baseball batgirl, a wrestling mat maid, and a football and basketball pompon squad member.

Ross went on to study at the University of Oklahoma. She interned at KOKH-TV during her senior year at Oklahoma. She began her broadcasting journalism career at KOCO-TV in Oklahoma City.

== Broadcast career ==
In 1981, Ross earned the title Maid of Cotton. The role had her serving as America's global ambassador to the cotton industry and promoting cotton use while traveling abroad. Ross spent 18 months at KOCO-TV; four years at Columbus, Ohio's WBNS-TV; two years in Bristol, Connecticut for ESPN; and nine months at Sports News Network in Washington, D.C. After a 9-month hiatus, she landed at KLAS-TV, becoming Las Vegas's first female weekday sports anchor, where she lasted less than a year. She went to WTVJ in Miami. On December 16, 1992, she met Dave Dombrowski when the expansion Florida Marlins signed Benito Santiago. Santiago hit the 1993 Marlins first home run in April and another month later Dombrowski asked her out. On December 31, 1995, Ross married Dombrowski in Oklahoma City. The couple settled in the Detroit suburb of Bloomfield Hills, Michigan. They had two children by 2004.

Ross was regarded as one of the first female sportscasters with a solid knowledge of sports, following in the footsteps of Gayle Gardner. Ross was one of the first women to speak up about workplace conditions for women in her industry. Her service at GameDay was all voice work.

== Personal life ==
Ross is married to baseball executive Dave Dombrowski.
