= Rene Lachemann =

American baseball player and manager (born 1945)

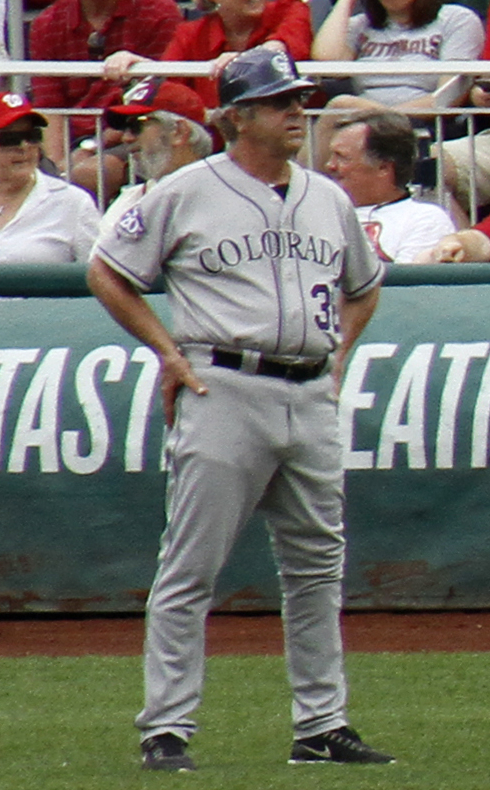
- Lachemann as a first base coach for the Colorado Rockies in 2013
- Catcher / Manager
- Born: May 4, 1945 (age 81); Los Angeles, California, US
- Batted: Right Threw: Right

MLB debut
- May 4, 1965, for the Kansas City Athletics

Last MLB appearance
- June 8, 1968, for the Oakland Athletics

MLB statistics
- Batting average: .210
- Home runs: 9
- Runs batted in: 33
- Managerial record: 428–560
- Winning %: .433
- Stats at Baseball Reference
- Managerial record at Baseball Reference

Teams
- As player: Kansas City / Oakland Athletics (1965–1966, 1968); As manager: Seattle Mariners (1981–1983); Milwaukee Brewers (1984); Florida Marlins (1993–1996); Chicago Cubs (2002); As coach: Boston Red Sox (1985–1986); Oakland Athletics (1987–1992); St. Louis Cardinals (1997–1999); Chicago Cubs (2000–2002); Seattle Mariners (2003–2004); Oakland Athletics (2005–2007); Colorado Rockies (2013–2016)

Career highlights and awards
- World Series champion (1989)

Rene George Lachemann (born May 4, 1945) is an American former professional baseball coach, catcher and manager. He spent 53 years in Major League Baseball (MLB), including service as the manager of the Seattle Mariners (1981–83), Milwaukee Brewers (1984), and the Florida Marlins (1993–96).

== Early connections with LaRussa, Duncan ==
1969 postcard of Lachemann for the Oakland Athletics

Born in Los Angeles and the son of a hotel chef, Lachemann is the youngest of three brothers to enjoy long careers in professional baseball: Marcel Lachemann is a member of the Los Angeles Angels' front office and a former pitcher, coach and manager in the Major Leagues, and Bill is a longtime manager and instructor in the Angels' farm system. Rene served as a batboy for the Los Angeles Dodgers from 1959 to 1962, graduated from Dorsey High School, and attended the University of Southern California. He signed a bonus contract with the Kansas City Athletics in 1964, where he joined other young players such as Tony La Russa and Dave Duncan, with whom he would have a lasting professional association.

Lachemann, a 6-foot (1.83 m), 198 lb (90 kg) right-handed hitter, played only one full season in the major leagues, batting .227 in 1965 with nine home runs and 29 runs batted in and appearing in 92 games. He played briefly—in 26 total games—for the A's in 1966 and 1968, but spent the rest of his playing career in minor league baseball. His major league batting average was .210 in 281 at bats.

== Manager in Seattle and Milwaukee ==
Lachemann began managing in the Oakland Athletics' farm system in 1973, and switched to the Seattle organization five years later. On May 6, 1981, Lachemann was promoted from Triple-A Spokane to succeed Maury Wills as the M's manager. But during the equivalent of almost two full seasons, Seattle was 140–180 (.438) and in the midst of an eight-game losing streak when Lachemann was fired on June 25, 1983, and replaced by Del Crandall. He returned the following year as manager of the contending Milwaukee Brewers, but the club collapsed to 67–94 (.416), last in the American League East, and he was fired with three games remaining to be played, though he was allowed to complete the season with the Brewers.

Lachemann was a major league coach for the next eight seasons, under John McNamara with the Boston Red Sox (1985–86) and La Russa with the Oakland Athletics (1987–92). He was the third-base coach with Boston's 1986 American League champions and the Athletics during their three consecutive (1988–90) American League pennants, and their 1989 World Series championship.

== First Marlins' manager ==
Due to his success with the Athletics, on October 23, 1992, he became the expansion Marlins’ first manager when they entered the National League at the outset of the 1993 season. He was chosen over candidates such as former major league managers Bill Virdon and Jimy Williams, and also was a finalist for the managerial job with the Texas Rangers, who hired Kevin Kennedy.

The Marlins were 64–98 (.395) in their inaugural season, good for sixth place in the NL East while being five games better than the New York Mets. In the strike-shortened season of 1994, they went 51–64 (.443) for a fifth-place finish. Florida improved to 67–76 (.469) and a fourth-place ranking the following year. For 1996, the team was playing slightly below average, being 39–47 (.453) by the time of the All-Star break. On July 7, Lachemann and hitting coach Jose Morales were fired. Lachemann was replaced by John Boles, a front-office executive for the Marlins at the time (Cookie Rojas was the interim manager for one game). General manager Dave Dombrowski described the move as an "extremely difficult decision to make at this time," citing the team's play as the reason for the change. Lachemann described his biggest regret that he would not be around to see the team win. As the Marlins' manager, Lachemann compiled a 221–285 (.437) record. The next year, the Marlins won the World Series.

== Later coaching career ==
He returned to the coaching ranks the following season, on La Russa's staff with the St. Louis Cardinals, then coached for the Chicago Cubs and the Mariners, before returning to Oakland in 2005 for three years as bench coach and third base coach. His contract was not renewed after 2007 and he joined the Colorado Rockies' organization in 2008. Lachemann served through 2012 as hitting coach for their Triple-A affiliate Colorado Springs, then was added to the Rockies' MLB staff in 2013 by manager Walt Weiss, a former Oakland shortstop. He worked under Weiss for four seasons, until the Rockies changed managers at the close of 2016.

Including a one-game stint as interim manager of the 2002 Cubs, Lachemann's major league managing record was 428–560 (.433).

== Managerial record ==
| Team | Year | Regular season | | | | | Postseason | | | |
| Team | Year | Games | Won | Lost | Win % | Finish | Won | Lost | Win % | Result |
|---|---|---|---|---|---|---|---|---|---|---|
| SEA | 1981 | 33 | 15 | 18 | .455 | 6th in AL West | – | – | – | – |
| SEA | 1981 | 52 | 23 | 29 | .442 | 5th in AL West | – | – | – | – |
| SEA | 1982 | 162 | 76 | 86 | .469 | 4th in AL West | – | – | – | – |
| SEA | 1983 | 73 | 26 | 47 | .356 | (fired) | – | – | – | – |
| SEA total | | 320 | 140 | 180 | .438 | | – | – | – | – |
| MIL | 1984 | 161 | 67 | 94 | .416 | 7th in AL East | – | – | – | – |
| MIL total | | 161 | 67 | 94 | .416 | | – | – | – | – |
| FLA | 1993 | 162 | 64 | 98 | .395 | 6th in NL East | – | – | – | – |
| FLA | 1994 | 115 | 51 | 64 | .443 | 5th in NL East | Postseason canceled | | | |
| FLA | 1995 | 143 | 67 | 76 | .469 | 4th in NL East | – | – | – | – |
| FLA | 1996 | 86 | 39 | 47 | .453 | (fired) | – | – | – | – |
| FLA total | | 506 | 221 | 285 | .437 | | – | – | – | – |
| CHC* | 2002 | 1 | 0 | 1 | .000 | (interim) | – | – | – | – |
| CHC total | | 1 | 0 | 1 | .000 | | – | – | – | – |
| Total | | 988 | 428 | 560 | .433 | | – | – | – | – |

== See also ==
- List of St. Louis Cardinals coaches

Sporting positions
| Preceded by John Felske | Spokane Indians manager 1979–1981 | Succeeded by Ken Pape |
| Preceded by Maury Wills | Seattle Mariners manager 1981–1983 | Succeeded by Del Crandall |
| Preceded by Harvey Kuenn | Milwaukee Brewers manager 1984 | Succeeded by George Bamberger |
| Preceded by Eddie Yost | Boston Red Sox third base coach 1985–1986 | Succeeded by Joe Morgan |
| Preceded by Dave McKay | Oakland Athletics first base coach 1987–1988 | Succeeded by Dave McKay |
| Preceded by Jim Lefebvre | Oakland Athletics third base coach 1989–1992 | Succeeded by Tommie Reynolds |
| Preceded by Franchise established | Florida Marlins manager 1993–1996 | Succeeded by John Boles |
| Preceded by Tommie Reynolds | St. Louis Cardinals third base coach 1997–1999 | Succeeded by José Oquendo |
| Preceded by Billy Williams | Chicago Cubs bench coach 2000–2002 | Succeeded by Dick Pole |
| Preceded by Don Baylor | Chicago Cubs manager 2002 | Succeeded by Bruce Kimm |
| Preceded by John McLaren | Seattle Mariners bench coach 2003–2004 | Succeeded by Ron Hassey |
| Preceded by Chris Speier | Oakland Athletics bench coach 2005 | Succeeded by Bob Geren |
| Preceded by Brad Fischer | Oakland Athletics first base coach 2006 | Succeeded by Tye Waller |
| Preceded by Ron Washington | Oakland Athletics third base coach 2007 | Succeeded by Tony DeFrancesco |
| Preceded by Glenallen Hill | Colorado Rockies first base coach 2013 | Succeeded by Eric Young |
| Preceded by Jerry Weinstein | Colorado Rockies catching coach 2014–2016 | Succeeded by None |
