= Luis Aquino =

Puerto Rican baseball player (born 1964)

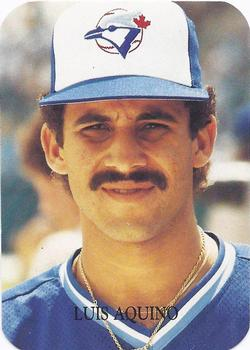
- Pitcher
- Born: May 19, 1964 (age 60); Santurce, Puerto Rico
- Batted: Right Threw: Right

Professional debut
- MLB: August 8, 1986, for the Toronto Blue Jays
- NPB: March 31, 1996, for the Kintetsu Buffaloes

Last appearance
- MLB: September 12, 1995, for the San Francisco Giants
- NPB: October 5, 1996, for the Kintetsu Buffaloes

MLB statistics
- Win–loss record: 31–32
- Earned run average: 3.68
- Strikeouts: 318

NPB statistics
- Win–loss record: 11–9
- Earned run average: 4.04
- Strikeouts: 58
- Stats at Baseball Reference

Teams
- Toronto Blue Jays (1986); Kansas City Royals (1988–1992); Florida Marlins (1993–1994); Montreal Expos (1995); San Francisco Giants (1995); Kintetsu Buffaloes (1996)

Luis Antonio Colón Aquino [ah-KEE-noh] (born May 19, 1964) is a Puerto Rican former starting pitcher and middle relief pitcher in Major League Baseball who played for the Toronto Blue Jays (1986), Kansas City Royals (1988–1992), Florida Marlins (1993–1994), Montreal Expos (1995) and San Francisco Giants (1995).

== Career ==
Aquino signed with the Toronto Blue Jays as an amateur free agent in 1981 and made his major league debut with Toronto in 1986. He was later traded to the Kansas City Royals for Juan Beníquez. Aquino played most of his professional career with the Royals, but also had major league appearances for the Marlins, Expos and Giants.

In a nine-year career, Aquino posted a 31–32 record with five saves and an ERA of 3.68, lower than the league average over his career.

Aquino was a member of the inaugural Florida Marlins team that began play in 1993.

== See also ==
- List of Major League Baseball players from Puerto Rico
