= Jack Armstrong (baseball) =

American baseball player (born 1965)

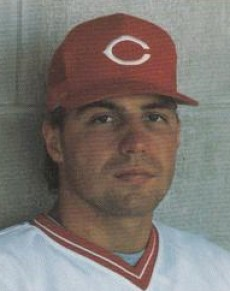
- Pitcher
- Born: March 7, 1965 (age 61); Englewood, New Jersey, U.S.
- Batted: Right Threw: Right

MLB debut
- June 21, 1988, for the Cincinnati Reds

Last MLB appearance
- April 17, 1994, for the Texas Rangers

MLB statistics
- Win–loss record: 40–65
- Earned run average: 4.58
- Strikeouts: 510
- Stats at Baseball Reference

Teams
- Cincinnati Reds (1988–1991); Cleveland Indians (1992); Florida Marlins (1993); Texas Rangers (1994)

Career highlights and awards
- All-Star (1990); World Series champion (1990)

Jack William Armstrong (born March 7, 1965) is an American former Major League Baseball right-handed pitcher who played for several teams between 1988 and 1994. He is a graduate of Neptune High School in Neptune Township, New Jersey, where he once struck out 22 batters in a nine-inning game, and an alumnus of Rider College and the University of Oklahoma.

== Amateur career ==
Armstrong attended Rider University and the University of Oklahoma. In 1985 and 1986, he played collegiate summer baseball with the Wareham Gatemen of the Cape Cod Baseball League (CCBL). In 1986, he was MVP of the CCBL all-star game, and received the league's Outstanding Pitcher award.

== Professional career ==
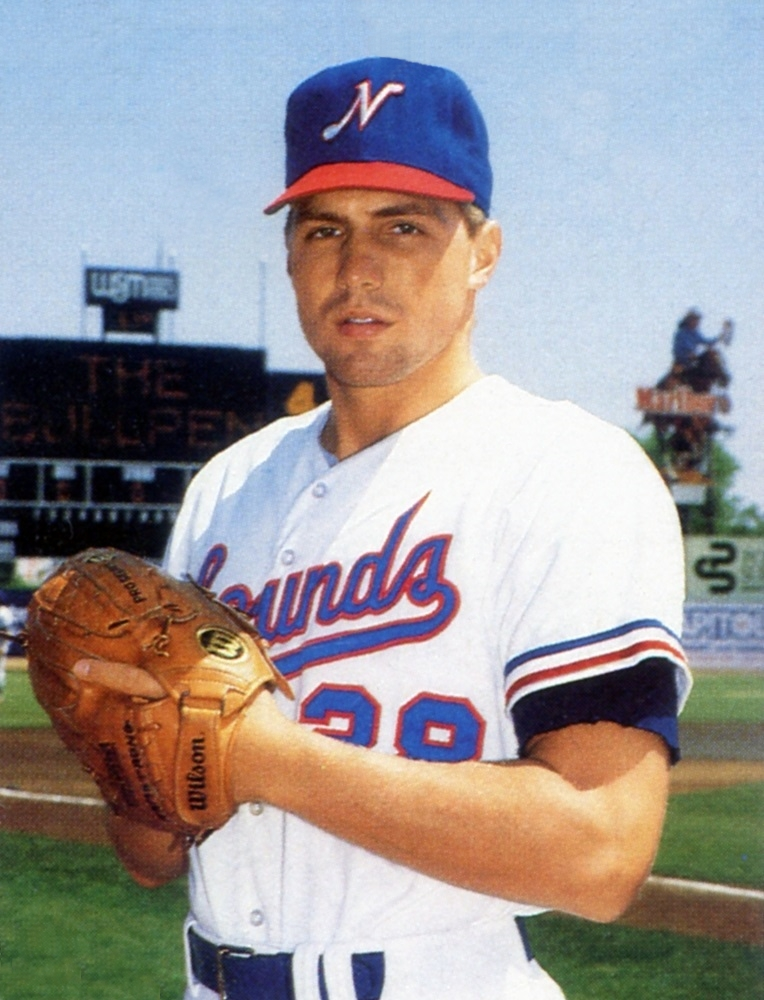
Armstrong with the Nashville Sounds in 1988

Drafted by the Cincinnati Reds in the 1st round of the 1987 MLB amateur draft, Armstrong made his big-league debut on June 21, 1988, and appeared in his final game on April 17, 1994. A torn rotator cuff helped end his career at the age of 27. Armstrong was also a member of the inaugural Florida Marlins team in 1993.

Armstrong had the best year of his career with the Cincinnati Reds in 1990. He won eight of his first nine starts and was the National League's starting pitcher in the All-Star Game. He tailed off, however, ending the year with a record of 12–9 and a 3.42 ERA. He relieved Scott Scudder in Game 2 of the 1990 World Series with the Reds trailing, 4–3. Armstrong pitched three scoreless innings against the Oakland Athletics, and the Reds won the game in the 10th inning.

After his career 1990 season, he spent one more year with the Reds, before being traded for Greg Swindell. He then spent one season each with the Indians, Marlins, and Rangers before retiring.

== Personal life ==
His son, Jack Armstrong Jr., turned down a $1 million signing bonus from the Texas Rangers out of high school in order to play college baseball for the Vanderbilt Commodores. He was later drafted by Houston and signed for a $750,000 bonus, although injuries derailed his career. Erik, his younger son, played baseball at the University of South Carolina Beaufort.
