= Joe Klink =

American baseball player (born 1962)

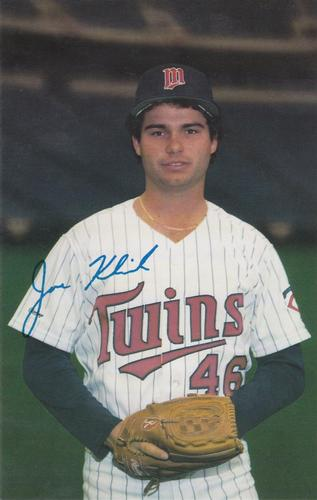
- Klink in 1987
- Pitcher
- Born: February 3, 1962 (age 64); Johnstown, Pennsylvania, U.S.
- Batted: Left Threw: Left

MLB debut
- April 9, 1987, for the Minnesota Twins

Last MLB appearance
- May 17, 1996, for the Seattle Mariners

MLB statistics
- Win–loss record: 10–6
- Earned run average: 4.26
- Strikeouts: 94
- Stats at Baseball Reference

Teams
- Minnesota Twins (1987); Oakland Athletics (1990–1991); Florida Marlins (1993); Seattle Mariners (1996)

Joseph Charles Klink (born February 3, 1962) is an American former professional baseball pitcher. He played in Major League Baseball (MLB) from 1987 to 1996 for the Minnesota Twins, Oakland Athletics, Florida Marlins, and Seattle Mariners. Klink once went 90 consecutive games without allowing a home run, the longest by a left-handed pitcher since at least 1957 and possibly the longest such streak of all time.

Klink attended St. Thomas University. In 1982, he played collegiate summer baseball with the Harwich Mariners of the Cape Cod Baseball League. He was selected by the New York Mets in the 36th round of the 1983 MLB draft.

New York traded him to Minnesota in January 1986 with Billy Beane and Bill Latham for Tim Teufel and Pat Crosby. Klink made his major league debut in April 1987, playing in 12 games for the Twins before he was sent back to the minors in June. Minnesota traded him to Oakland for a player to be named later in March 1988. He led the Southern League with 26 saves in 1989. Klink returned to the majors until 1990 and made his only postseason appearance that fall, walking Hal Morris in Game 3 of the World Series. After two seasons with the Athletics, Klink missed 1992 with an elbow injury. He signed a minor league contract with the expansion Marlins in January 1993 and tied with closer Bryan Harvey for the team lead with 59 pitching appearances that season. Florida released him ahead of the 1994 season. He returned to the majors in May 1996 with the Mariners. He gave up a home run to Michael Tucker of the Kansas City Royals on May 10, his first MLB home run allowed since July 1991.

Klink is married and has a daughter.
