= Cris Carpenter =

American baseball player (born 1965)

- Pitcher
- Born: April 5, 1965 (age 60); St. Augustine, Florida, U.S.
- Batted: Right Threw: Right

MLB debut
- May 14, 1988, for the St. Louis Cardinals

Last MLB appearance
- April 26, 1996, for the Milwaukee Brewers

MLB statistics
- Win–loss record: 27–22
- Earned run average: 3.91
- Strikeouts: 252
- Stats at Baseball Reference

Teams
- St. Louis Cardinals (1988–1992); Florida Marlins (1993); Texas Rangers (1993–1994); Milwaukee Brewers (1996)
Medals
Men's baseball
Representing United States
Pan American Games
Silver medal – second place	1987 Indianapolis	Team

Cris Howell Carpenter (born April 5, 1965) is an American former Major League Baseball right-handed pitcher who played for the St. Louis Cardinals, Florida Marlins, Texas Rangers, and Milwaukee Brewers from 1988 to 1996.

== Amateur career ==
A native of St. Augustine, Florida, Carpenter is an alumnus of the University of Georgia. He was the punter for the Georgia football team in 1985 and 1986, and still ranks fourth for longest career average (44.1 yards) in Georgia's record book. In 1986, he played collegiate summer baseball with the Cotuit Kettleers of the Cape Cod Baseball League and was named a league all-star.

== Professional career ==
Drafted by the St. Louis Cardinals in the 1st round of the 1987 MLB amateur draft, Carpenter would make his Major League Baseball debut with the St. Louis Cardinals on May 14, 1988, and appeared in his final game on April 26, 1996, with the Milwaukee Brewers. Over his career, he had 27 wins, 414 1/3 innings pitched, and 252 strikeouts along with a 3.91 ERA. He was used mainly as a relief pitcher. Carpenter was a member of the inaugural Florida Marlins team that began play in Major League Baseball in 1993.

== Personal ==
Cris Carpenter now works at Gainesville High School, in Gainesville, Georgia, as a social studies teacher.
