= Mitch Lyden =

American baseball player (born 1964)

- Catcher
- Born: December 14, 1964 (age 61); Portland, Oregon
- Batted: Right Threw: Right

MLB debut
- June 16, 1993, for the Florida Marlins

Last MLB appearance
- October 3, 1993, for the Florida Marlins

MLB statistics
- Batting average: .300
- Hits: 3
- Runs Batted In: 1
- Stats at Baseball Reference

Teams
- Florida Marlins (1993)

Mitchell Scott Lyden (December 14, 1964), is an American former professional baseball player who played catcher in the Major League Baseball (MLB) in 1993. He would play for the Florida Marlins. On June 16, 1993, he hit a home run in his first major league at bat, against the Chicago Cubs, on the second pitch. In his 6-game MLB career, he hit .300 (3-10) with 1 home run and 1 run batted in.

Lyden would continue playing professionally through 2000, including time in the independent Northern League for the Québec Capitales and Elmira Pioneers.Lyden would manage the Pioneers in 2002 and 2003, leading the team to the playoffs in his first season at the helm.

== Post-Baseball Career ==
Following his time in professional baseball, Lyden became a deputy with the Broward County Sheriff's Office and played softball with their recreation team. In March 2021, Lyden received praise for his professionalism for calmly diffusing an attempt at what the media reported as a suicide by cop attempt by a Tamarac, Florida resident.
