= Chris Hammond =

American baseball player (born 1966)

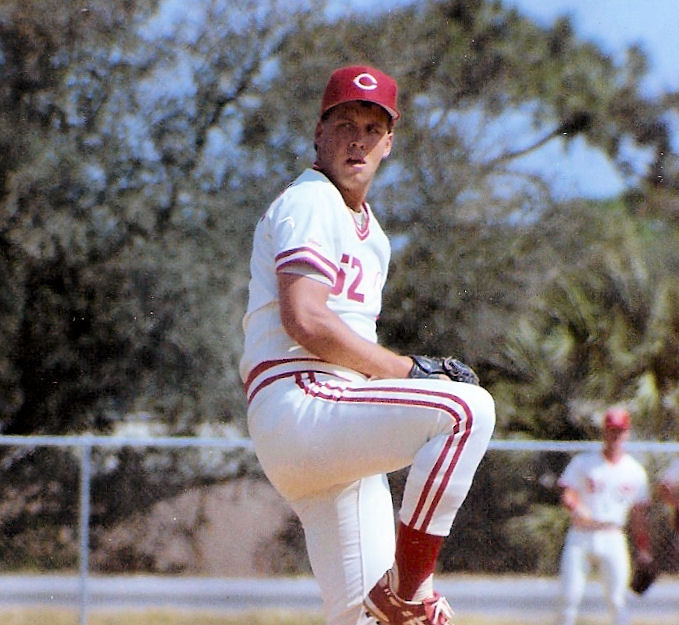
- Pitcher
- Born: January 21, 1966 (age 60); Atlanta, Georgia, U.S.
- Batted: Left Threw: Left

MLB debut
- July 16, 1990, for the Cincinnati Reds

Last MLB appearance
- June 29, 2006, for the Cincinnati Reds

MLB statistics
- Win–loss record: 66–62
- Earned run average: 4.14
- Strikeouts: 712
- Stats at Baseball Reference

Teams
- Cincinnati Reds (1990–1992); Florida Marlins (1993–1996); Boston Red Sox (1997); Florida Marlins (1998); Atlanta Braves (2002); New York Yankees (2003); Oakland Athletics (2004); San Diego Padres (2005); Cincinnati Reds (2006)

Christopher Andrew Hammond (born January 21, 1966) is an American former left-handed pitcher in Major League Baseball.

Hammond was drafted by the Cincinnati Reds in the sixth round of the 1986 amateur draft. Hammond had not sustained considerable success until his revival as a relief pitcher with the 2002 Atlanta Braves. His career went through two distinct phases, one as a struggling starting pitcher/swingman and one as a reliever. Hammond used techniques common to "junkball" or finesse pitchers. His pitches included the changeup (Hammond's ranged from 58 - 71 mph), his mostly flat slider, and his low 80s four-seam fastball. Hammond was also a relatively good left-handed hitter as shown by his career .202 batting average, .285 on-base percentage, and four career home runs.

== Professional baseball career ==
=== Cincinnati Reds ===
Hammond first appeared in the Major Leagues in 1990 where he pitched three games for the Reds. The following season was his official rookie season and he started 18 games posting a 7-7 record with a respectable 4.06 ERA. His first stint with the Reds would come to a close in late March 1993 as he was traded to the Florida Marlins for Héctor Carrasco and Gary Scott.

=== Florida Marlins ===
Hammond was a member of the inaugural Marlins team that began play in Major League Baseball in 1993. In his inaugural season as a Marlin, he hit two home runs (one a pinch-hit grand slam), and pitched his way to a 4.66 ERA in 191 innings. In 1994, he experienced somewhat more success (a 3.07 ERA) in a season shortened by injuries. After a mediocre 1995 season, Hammond's career seemed to hit a nosedive. His first stint with the Florida Marlins would end in 1996, where he totaled a 6.56 ERA and would face a demotion to the bullpen.

=== Boston Red Sox ===
Hammond signed with the Boston Red Sox in 1997, intending to return to his role as a starter. Instead, Hammond was utilized as a relief pitcher. In an interview in Yankees' magazine during 2002, Hammond revealed that the Red Sox offered this promise as a ruse to sign him. While Hammond's career was seemingly reaching its end, the Florida Marlins won the 1997 World Series.

=== Retirement ===
After being signed to a contract by the Kansas City Royals, he was granted his release towards the end of spring training. Just as they did in 1993, the Marlins signed him to be a starting pitcher. Hammond returned to the Major Leagues for three starts, compiling a 6.56 ERA in 13.2 innings. After this brief comeback attempt, Hammond had shoulder surgery and he retired for the first time. Hammond returned to a quiet family life in Randolph County, Alabama, where he purchased a 200+ acre horse-ranch with a 60-acre (240,000 m^{2}) lake.

=== Comeback: Atlanta Braves ===
Hammond returned in 2001 as a minor league player for the Cleveland Indians. At mid-season, he was released by the Indians and then signed to a minor league contract with the Atlanta Braves. Hammond was on Atlanta's major league roster in 2002. In 2002, Hammond pitched 76.0 innings in 63 games while posting a 0.95 ERA. Hammond became the fourth pitcher at that point in time to ever post an ERA below 1.00 while pitching over a full season with over an inning an appearance. Hammond also had a streak of nearly thirty consecutive scoreless innings during the season that helped him achieve this historic mark. At the end of the season, the New York Yankees signed Hammond to a multi-year contract. While with the Braves, he continued to live in Randolph County, Alabama and commuted back and forth to Atlanta.

=== New York Yankees ===
Hammond replaced the incumbent Mike Stanton as the left-handed setup man in the Yankees' bullpen. Joe Torre tried to use Hammond as a left-handed specialist because the bullpen lacked other left-handed pitchers. Hammond allowed the lowest percentage of inherited runners to score in the 2003 Yankees bullpen while posting a 2.86 ERA. He only had one appearance during the 2003 postseason, pitching two innings without allowing an earned run during the World Series while facing the Marlins.

=== Oakland Athletics ===
Hammond was traded to the Oakland Athletics during the 2003 off-season. Hammond missed some time during the season due to a recurrence of shoulder injuries, but was able to post a 2.68 ERA in 41 appearances.

=== San Diego Padres ===
In 2005, Hammond signed with the San Diego Padres. Hammond had posted a WHIP under 1.00 until shoulder injuries nagged him once again. Hammond would finish the season with an ERA of 3.84 in 55 appearances.

=== Reds: 2006 ===
Hammond returned to Cincinnati in 2006, where his career started; however, this was short-lived, as he was released on July 12. Hammond would end his 2006 season with a 6.91 ERA in 28.2 innings pitched.

== Personal life ==
Chris resides in Oxford, Alabama with his wife, Lynne. They have two sons and one daughter, Andy, Jake, and Alex. He is active in his church and founded the Chris Hammond Youth Foundation, a "Charity Organization to help Youth Through Athletics".
