= Terry Mathews =

American baseball player (1964–2012)

- Pitcher
- Born: October 5, 1964; Alexandria, Louisiana, U.S.
- Died: February 24, 2012 (aged 47); Alexandria, Louisiana, U.S.
- Batted: Left Threw: Right

MLB debut
- June 21, 1991, for the Texas Rangers

Last MLB appearance
- August 11, 1999, for the Kansas City Royals

MLB statistics
- Win–loss record: 22–21
- Earned run average: 4.25
- Strikeouts: 300
- Stats at Baseball Reference

Teams
- Texas Rangers (1991–1992); Florida Marlins (1994–1996); Baltimore Orioles (1996–1998); Kansas City Royals (1999)

Terry Alan Mathews (October 5, 1964 – February 24, 2012) was an American professional baseball player who pitched in Major League Baseball (MLB) from 1991 to 1999. He played for the Texas Rangers, Florida Marlins, Baltimore Orioles, and Kansas City Royals.

Mathews pitched in college at Northeast Louisiana University (now known as the University of Louisiana at Monroe).

== Career ==
Matthews had a 3.38 earned run average (ERA) in 57 appearances as the Marlins' setup man in 1995. After being replaced in the role by Jay Powell and with a 4.91 ERA in 57 games in 1996, he was acquired by the Orioles from the Marlins on August 21 of that year in a transaction that was completed two days later on August 23 when Gregg Zaun was sent to Florida.

== Personal life ==
Mathews was married to his wife Emily, and they had three children, two of whom play baseball/softball. He was a school resource officer at his alma mater, Holy Savior Menard Central High School in Alexandria, Louisiana, and had also been a volunteer baseball coach there.

Mathews died from a heart attack on February 24, 2012, at the age of 47.
