= Bob Natal =

American baseball player (born 1965)

Rob Natal
- Catcher
- Born: November 13, 1965 (age 60); Long Beach, California, U.S.
- Batted: Right Threw: Right

MLB debut
- July 8, 1992, for the Montreal Expos

Last MLB appearance
- September 26, 1997, for the Florida Marlins

MLB statistics
- Batting average: .197
- Home runs: 4
- Runs batted in: 19
- Stats at Baseball Reference

Teams
- Montreal Expos (1992); Florida Marlins (1993–1997)

Robert Marcel Natal (born November 13, 1965) is an American former Major League Baseball catcher. He is an alumnus of the University of California, San Diego.

== Career ==
Natal attended Hilltop High School in Chula Vista, California. As a senior in 1993, he batted .430 and was named the Chula Vista Star-News Player of the Year. Natal helped the Lancers win the CIF San Diego Section Division 3A title, hitting a grand slam in their 9–1 championship game victory over Poway High School. He also played football as an offensive lineman, earning first-team all-Mesa League honors and an invite to the inaugural Fellowship Bowl all-star game played at DeVore Stadium. Natal was inducted into the inaugural class of the Hilltop High Athletic Hall of Fame in 2001.

Natal attended the University of California, San Diego (UCSD), where he played college baseball for the Tritons. As a senior in 1987, he earned second-team honors on the NCAA Division III All-America team after setting school records in batting average (.465), hits (74), RBIs (67), home runs (18) and runs (50). In 200 games played, Natal also set career marks with a .368 average, 257 hits, 208 RBIs, and 53 home runs, leading the Los Angeles Times to describe him as "probably the best player in UCSD history".

Natal was drafted by the Montreal Expos in the 13th round of the 1987 MLB amateur draft. He made his major league debut with the Montreal Expos on July 18, 1992, and appeared in his final game on September 26, 1997.

Natal was a member of the inaugural Florida Marlins team that began play in Major League Baseball in 1993 and won a World Series with the team in 1997.

He currently serves as the minor league catching instructor for the New York Mets.
