= Sandwich pick =

Draft pick in Major League Baseball

A sandwich pick is a type of draft pick awarded to Major League Baseball teams for the loss of their free agents who meet the minimum requirements by the Elias Rankings. Under the previous collective bargaining agreement, there were three categories of free agents, type A, type B, and type C, or unranked.

A sandwich pick is a pick that takes place in the supplemental round between the 1st and 2nd round of the MLB amateur draft each June and is usually noted as round 1a.

If a type A or type B free agent signs with a team that the player did not finish the previous season with, his former team will receive a sandwich pick for the departed player. As well as the sandwich pick, type A free agents will also net their former team a forfeited pick from the signing team. The forfeited pick is generally the signing team's 1st round draft choice; however, there are certain factors which could result in a different round for the pick. In order for the team to receive a compensation pick, the free agent must be offered arbitration or be signed by their new team prior to the arbitration deadline.

The order of the supplemental picks is determined by the Elias ranking of each signed free agent. So each sandwich pick awarded for type A free agents would take place before any type B sandwich picks.

== Examples ==
- Jay Allen - drafted 30th overall in 2021 by the Cincinnati Reds
- Matheu Nelson - drafted 35th overall in 2021 by the Cincinnati Reds
- Anthony Ranaudo - drafted 39th overall in 2010 by the Boston Red Sox
- Luke Jackson - drafted 45th overall in 2010 by the Texas Rangers
