= Jeff Conine =

American baseball player (born 1966)

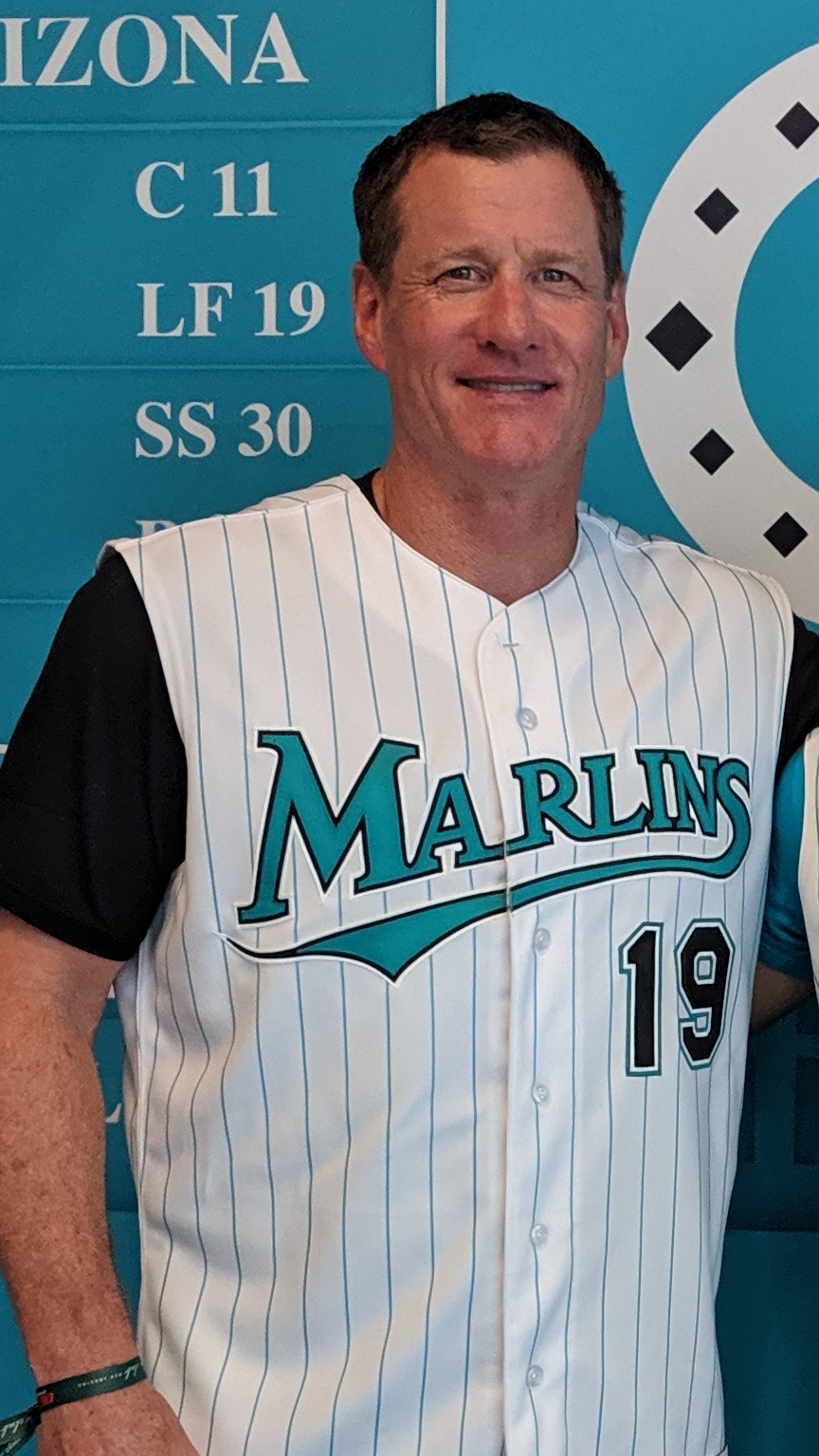
- Conine in 2019
- First baseman / Left fielder
- Born: June 27, 1966 (age 60); Tacoma, Washington, U.S.
- Batted: Right Threw: Right

MLB debut
- September 16, 1990, for the Kansas City Royals

Last MLB appearance
- September 30, 2007, for the New York Mets

MLB statistics
- Batting average: .285
- Home runs: 214
- Runs batted in: 1,071
- Stats at Baseball Reference

Teams
- Kansas City Royals (1990, 1992); Florida Marlins (1993–1997); Kansas City Royals (1998); Baltimore Orioles (1999–2003); Florida Marlins (2003–2005); Baltimore Orioles (2006); Philadelphia Phillies (2006); Cincinnati Reds (2007); New York Mets (2007)

Career highlights and awards
- 2× All-Star (1994, 1995); 2× World Series champion (1997, 2003); Marlins Legends Hall of Fame

Jeffrey Guy Conine (/ˈkoʊnaɪn/; born June 27, 1966) is an American former professional baseball left fielder / first baseman and current front office assistant for the Miami Marlins, who played in Major League Baseball (MLB) for 17 seasons, with six teams. An inaugural member of the Florida Marlins who was with the franchise for both of its World Series titles, he was nicknamed "Mr. Marlin" for his significant history with the club.

Conine was born in Tacoma, Washington, played baseball at UCLA, and was drafted in the 58th round of the 1987 Major League Baseball draft by the Kansas City Royals. After two cup of coffee stints with the Royals, Conine was selected by the Marlins in the 1992 Major League Baseball expansion draft. Becoming the team's first star, he played five seasons with the Marlins, earning the most valuable player award at the 1995 Major League Baseball All-Star Game and was part of the World Series-winning team in 1997.

A victim of a fire sale after the 1997 season, Conine was traded back to the Royals and then to the Baltimore Orioles. Traded back to the Marlins in 2003, he helped the team win a second World Series title. He remained with the team until 2005, returning to the Orioles as a free agent. He became a journeyman outfielder near the end of his career, signing a one-day contract to retire as a member of the Marlins in 2008. He was the first Marlin inducted into the Marlins Legends Hall of Fame in 2025.

== Early career ==
Conine played college baseball at UCLA, where he was originally a relief pitcher. In the summer of 1986, he won a Cape Cod Baseball League title with the Orleans Cardinals. He was drafted by the Kansas City Royals in the 58th round of the 1987 Major League Baseball draft as a first baseman. Prior to the draft, Conine was considered a mediocre pitching prospect with a high earned run average and a "decent" slider. He only had one plate appearance as a member of the Bruins, and was hit by a pitch. A recommendation by Royals scout and former UCLA pitching coach Guy Hansen led Conine to be drafted, when Hansen told Royals general manager John Schuerholz that the best hitter on UCLA's team "was a pitcher". After three minor league seasons, in which Conine batted .290 with 39 home runs and 214 runs batted in, he joined the Royals as a September call-up in 1990. He returned to the minors for two more seasons, and learned to play the outfield with the Omaha Royals before returning to the majors late in the 1992 season.

== Professional baseball career ==
=== Florida Marlins (1993–1997) ===
Conine was selected by the Florida Marlins in the 1992 Major League Baseball expansion draft, and converted into a full-time left fielder. Though the Marlins narrowly avoided 100 losses, Conine emerged as a star. He went four-for-four in his first game as a Marlin in a 6–3 victory against the Los Angeles Dodgers. Conine played the full 162 game schedule in left field his rookie season. He batted .292 with 12 home runs and 79 RBIs to earn a third-place finish in National League Rookie of the Year balloting.

The following season, Conine was batting .313 with 13 home runs and 64 runs batted at mid-season and earned his first All-Star selection. He finished the strike shortened 1994 season with a career high .319 batting average, 18 home runs and 82 RBIs. During the strike, Conine returned to the Marlins' Instructional League affiliate in Brevard County, Florida, to learn third base.

The experiment never materialized, and Conine returned to left field once play resumed in 1995. He batted .340 with nine home runs and 24 RBIs in June to earn National League Player of the Month honors and his second consecutive All-Star nod. In his only career All-Star Game at-bat, he hit a go-ahead pinch-hit home run in the eighth inning and won the MVP award. For the season, he finished fourth in the league with a career-high 105 RBIs with a .302 batting average and 25 home runs. In 1996, Conine had 26 home runs, 95 RBIs, and a .293 batting average.

==== 1997 World Series Champions ====
Newly hired Marlins manager Jim Leyland shifted Conine back to first base in 1997. The club had acquired free agent Moisés Alou to play left field in Conine's stead. The Marlins finished second to the Atlanta Braves in the National League East by nine games, winning the wild card with a 92–70 record. After sweeping the San Francisco Giants in the 1997 National League Division Series, the Marlins defeated their division rival Braves in the 1997 National League Championship Series, four games to two. Conine's seventh inning single provided the game-winning RBI in game five of the series.

The Marlins beat Cleveland in a seven-game World Series to break the 1969 New York Mets' record as the youngest expansion franchise to ever win a World Series title. Conine batted .214 with no home runs, three RBIs and five runs scored in his first postseason. Immediately after winning the World Series, Marlins owner Wayne Huizenga dismantled his club, claiming financial losses despite having won the World Series. As part of the "fire sale" of his franchise's best players, Conine was shipped back to the Kansas City Royals for minor league pitcher Blaine Mull. At the time of his departure, Conine held the franchise records for hits, RBIs and games played.

=== Baltimore Orioles (1999–2003) ===
Chronic back pain limited Conine to 93 games with the Royals in 1998. Following just one season back in Kansas City, the Royals traded him to the Baltimore Orioles in exchange for pitcher Chris Fussell. Conine returned healthy, and enjoyed a resurgence with Baltimore, where he batted .291 with 13 home runs and 75 RBI in 1999. He also appeared in four games at third base for the first time at the major league level. In 2000, Conine became more of a utility player, appearing in 119 games and logging 452 at-bats without a regular starting position. He enjoyed a comeback 2001 season, batting .311 with 97 RBI, and was rewarded with a starting position back at first base. Conine batted .287 with 79 home runs and 410 RBI in five-plus seasons in Baltimore.

=== Second stint with Florida Marlins (2003–2005) ===
==== 2003 World Series Champions ====
After firing manager Jeff Torborg early in the 2003 season, the Florida Marlins dramatically improved their record under new manager Jack McKeon. On August 31, tied with the Philadelphia Phillies for the wild card playoff spot, the Marlins sent right-handed pitching prospects Denny Bautista and Don Levinski to Baltimore for Conine. Conine batted .239 with five home runs and fifteen RBIs over 25 games back in Florida, and the Marlins returned to the postseason for the second time in franchise history.

Conine batted .458 with three RBIs and a home run in Game Five of the 2003 National League Championship Series against the Chicago Cubs, and batted .333 in the World Series against the New York Yankees. He is the only player to appear in the opener of the Marlins' inaugural season, the 1997 World Series Marlins' championship team, and the 2003 World Series Marlins' championship team. He remained with the club through the 2005 season. He returned to the Baltimore Orioles via free agency in 2006.

=== Later career ===
In 2006, the Phillies were competing for the NL wild-card race and acquired Conine on August 27 for a player to be named later (infielder Ángel Chávez). Conine's role was to serve as a right-handed bat off the bench. Though Philadelphia failed to make the playoffs, Conine proved a solid addition, batting .280 with seventeen RBIs in 28 games.

When the Phillies signed free-agent Jayson Werth after the season, Conine became expendable, and was sent to the Cincinnati Reds for minor league prospects Bradley Key and Javon Moran. Platooning with Scott Hatteberg at first base, Conine batted .265 with six home runs and 32 RBIs over eighty games. His .409 batting average and four RBIs in 22 pinch hit at-bats made him an attractive player to the New York Mets, who were looking to add depth to their bench. On August 20, 2007, Conine was traded to the Mets for minor leaguers Sean Henry and Jose Castro. Though he hit an RBI single in his first at-bat as a Met, he proved less successful in that role with the Mets, batting just .195 over 21 games with his new club. On September 20, Conine announced that he was considering retirement before his final series in South Florida. He played his final game on September 30 against the Marlins, replacing an injured Carlos Delgado at first base.

On March 28, 2008, Conine signed a one-day contract with the Florida Marlins to officially retire as a member of the team. The Marlins held a tribute to Conine before their home opener against the Mets on March 31. He batted .290 over his career with the Marlins with 120 home runs and 553 RBIs. He holds the franchise mark for grand slam home runs with six.

In 2012, Conine debuted on the Baseball Hall of Fame ballot. He received no votes and was removed from the ballot the next year.

== Post-career ==
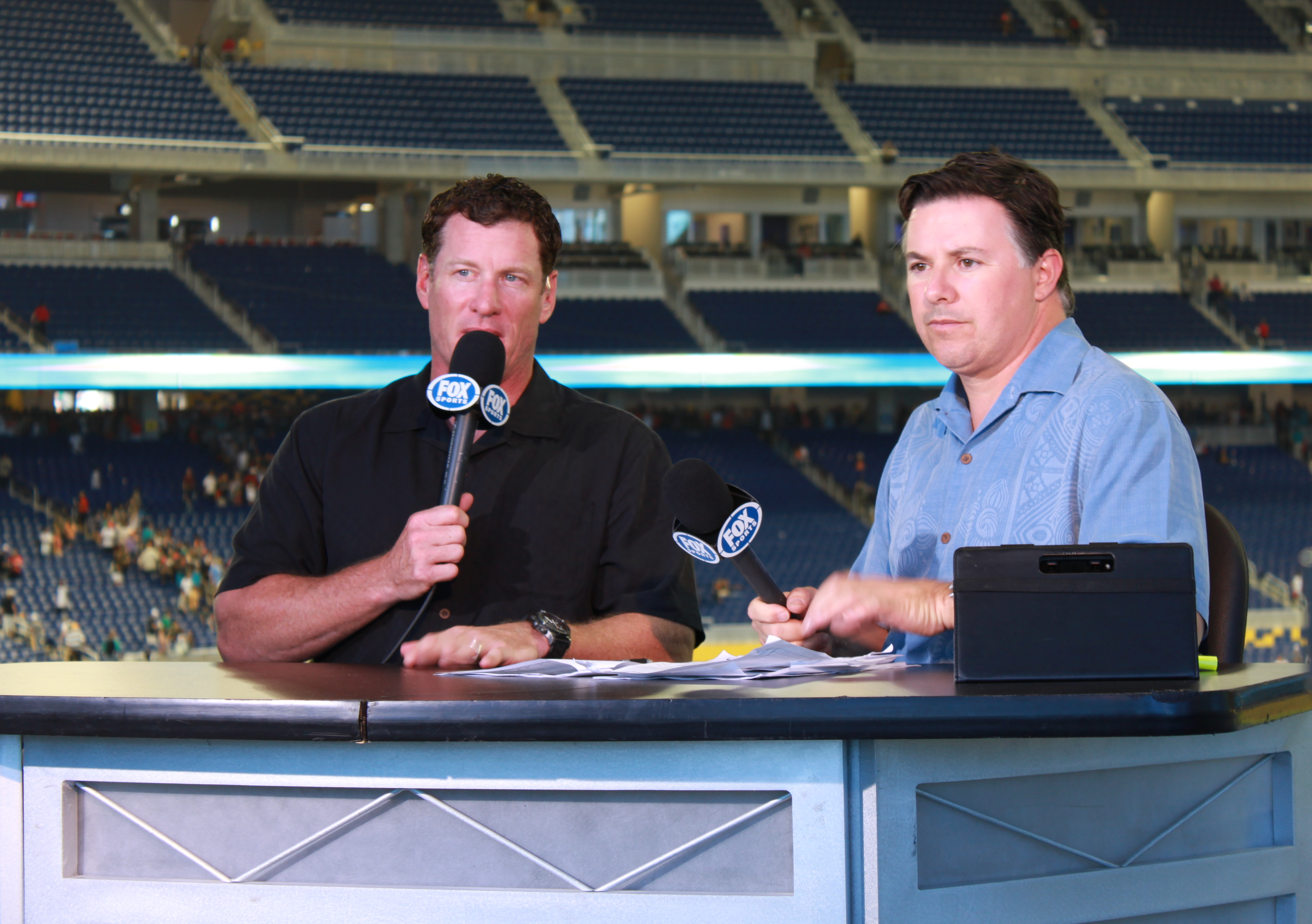
Jeff Conine broadcasting live during a post-game Fox Sports show.

Shortly after retiring from baseball, Conine began competing in triathlon. On December 26, 2007, while training for the Ford Ironman World Championship in Kona, Hawaii, he crashed his bicycle while trying to avoid a car pulling out in front of him, and shattered his collarbone. Though sidelined for two months by the accident, he still managed to compete in the Ironman and several other races that year.

Conine appeared as a color commentator on three Marlins Fox Sports Network telecasts in September 2008, filling in for Tommy Hutton. He was fired by Fox Sports Florida and from his position as special assistant by owner Derek Jeter on November 22, 2017.

On April 29, 2014, Conine was inducted into the Ride of Fame in Miami and a double decker tour bus was dedicated to him.

On June 4, 2021, Conine was named the associate head coach of Florida International University's baseball team under head coach Mervyl Melendez.

On November 17, 2022, Conine was hired by the Miami Marlins to serve as a special assistant for the 2023 season. On March 30, 2025, Conine became the first person inducted into the Miami Marlins Hall of Fame.

== Personal life ==
Jeff Conine graduated from Eisenhower High School in Rialto, California. His father is wrestler Gerald Conine, who represented the United States at the Summer Olympics in 1964. Jeff was a top junior racquetball player before focusing on baseball, and won the US 18U junior national singles title in 1985. Conine met his wife Cindy (Doyle) Conine (the sister of former top touring racquetball professional Tim Doyle and herself a top racquetball professional in the late 1980s-early 1990s) at a professional racquetball tournament in New York City. They have three children.

Conine's son Griffin is an MLB player.

== See also ==
- List of Major League Baseball career runs batted in leaders

Preceded by Matt Williams	National League Player of the Month; June 1995	Succeeded by Dante Bichette
