= Dave Dombrowski =

American baseball executive (born 1956)

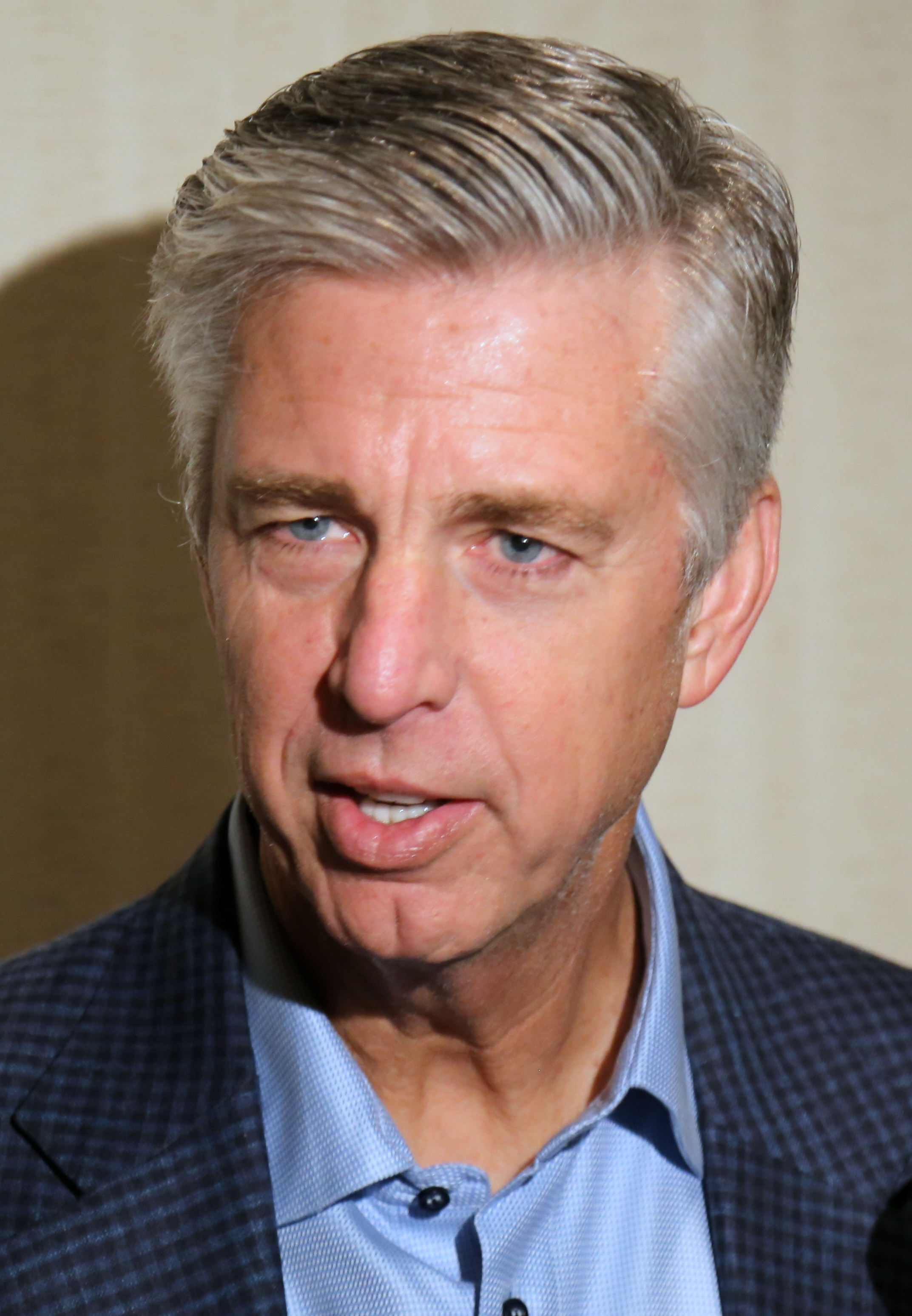
- Dombrowski in 2015

Philadelphia Phillies
- General manager / President of baseball operations
- Born: July 27, 1956 (age 70); Chicago, Illinois, U.S.

Teams
- As general manager: Montreal Expos (1988–1991); Florida Marlins (1993–2001); Detroit Tigers (2002–2015); As president of baseball operations: Boston Red Sox (2015–2019); Philadelphia Phillies (2021–present)

Career highlights and awards
- 2× World Series champion (1997, 2018); 1990 UPI Executive of the Year; 2× Baseball America Executive of the Year (2006, 2018); 2011 co-Sporting News Executive of the Year (with Doug Melvin)

David Dombrowski (born July 27, 1956) is an American baseball executive who serves as the president of baseball operations for the Philadelphia Phillies of Major League Baseball (MLB). Dombrowski also previously served as the general manager of the Montreal Expos, the general manager and president of the Florida Marlins and Detroit Tigers, and president of baseball operations for the Boston Red Sox. He has helped build four different franchises (Marlins, Tigers, Red Sox, Phillies) into pennant-winning teams, and he has won the World Series twice — with the Marlins in 1997 and the Red Sox in 2018.

== Career ==
=== Chicago White Sox ===
Dombrowski began his career with the Chicago White Sox in 1978, as an administrative assistant in their minor league organization. He moved up the ladder to assistant general manager to Roland Hemond by his late 20s, but was purged during Ken Harrelson's one-year reign in 1986 as the White Sox front-office boss.

=== Montreal Expos ===
Dombrowski joined the Montreal Expos front office as director of player development for the 1987 season under Bill Stoneman, and on July 5, 1988, he became, at age 31, Montreal's general manager—the youngest in MLB at the time.

Dombrowski built up the Expos farm system during his term. He drafted, among others, Rondell White and Cliff Floyd. The team enjoyed .500 or better seasons in 1988–90 but struggled on the field in 1991. Concurrently, the National League expanded to 14 teams, with two new franchises to begin play in 1993. One of those teams, the Florida Marlins, recruited Dombrowski to become its first general manager; he was appointed on September 19, 1991.

=== Florida Marlins ===
Dombrowski spent about a decade in Miami, working under owners H. Wayne Huizenga and John W. Henry. In 1996, he hired Jim Leyland to manage the team; they had previously worked together for the White Sox in the early 1980s, with Dombrowski as assistant general manager and Leyland as third base coach. Although Dombrowski built a sound minor league system, the Marlins achieved their first great success—the NL pennant and 1997 World Series title—with a team composed of many high-salaried players signed as free agents. The following year, Dombrowski presided over Huizenga's mandated fire sale of those veteran players, and the Marlins failed to reach a .500 winning percentage in each of Dombrowski's final four years with the franchise. In November 2001, Dombrowski left Florida to become the president of the Detroit Tigers. Nevertheless, after Henry sold the club in early 2002, the Marlins managed to rebuild behind a nucleus of young players, and the following season, with a roster consisting chiefly of players Dombrowski had acquired, the team won the 2003 World Series.

=== Detroit Tigers ===
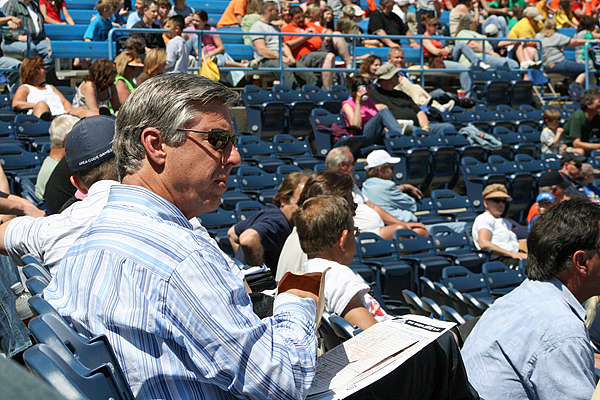
Dombrowski watches a West Michigan Whitecaps game at Fifth Third Ballpark, 2010

For the 2002 season, his first with the Tigers after being hired by owner Mike Ilitch, Dombrowski was to serve as president and chief executive officer of the rebuilding Tigers. Incumbent general manager Randy Smith would continue in his role, reporting to Dombrowski. However, when Detroit lost its first six games in 2002, Dombrowski quickly fired both Smith and manager Phil Garner. Dombrowski assumed the general manager's role himself, becoming the first person to serve as both president and GM for the Tigers since Jim Campbell held both titles from 1978 to 1983.

In 2003, the Tigers lost a then American League-record 119 games, one fewer than the modern MLB record at the time, set by the 1962 New York Mets. The manager was Alan Trammell, a popular ex-Tiger player who had been the 1984 World Series MVP. Three years later, the 2006 Tigers, led by manager Jim Leyland, won their first AL pennant since their championship season of 1984. Along the way, they won the AL wild card, defeated the favored New York Yankees in four games in the 2006 American League Division Series (ALDS), then swept the Oakland Athletics in the 2006 American League Championship Series (ALCS). In the 2006 World Series, they were defeated in five games by the St. Louis Cardinals. Dombrowski was subsequently named Executive of the Year by Baseball America.

In addition to bringing Leyland out of semi-retirement, Dombrowski presided over the acquisition and development of a corps of hard-throwing young pitchers, and signed free agents such as catcher Iván Rodríguez, left-handed pitcher Kenny Rogers, and outfielder Magglio Ordóñez.

In 2012, the Tigers reached their second World Series under Dombrowski's tenure by defeating the Oakland Athletics in five games in the 2012 ALDS and sweeping the New York Yankees in the 2012 ALCS. The Tigers were then swept by the San Francisco Giants in four straight games, losing the 2012 World Series.

On August 4, 2015, Dombrowski was released by the Tigers, and was replaced by his former assistant general manager Al Avila. In fourteen years with Tigers organization, Dombrowski led the Tigers to five playoff appearances, four consecutive American League Central division titles, four American League Championship Series appearances, including three consecutive ALCS appearances from 2011 to 2013, and two AL pennants, in 2006 and 2012. Prior to his hiring, the Tigers had missed the playoffs in fourteen consecutive seasons, and had just four playoff appearances in the 60 season stretch from 1946 to 2005.

=== Boston Red Sox ===
On August 18, 2015, Dombrowski was named the president of baseball operations of the Boston Red Sox. At the announcement of his hiring, the Red Sox also announced that general manager Ben Cherington would step down. In September, Dombrowski filled Cherington's post with senior vice president Mike Hazen. Dombrowski made his first significant trade for the Red Sox in November, when he acquired closer Craig Kimbrel from the San Diego Padres for four prospects. He also signed high-profile free agent pitcher David Price to a seven-year, $217 million contract.

In Dombrowski's first full season with the team, the 2016 Red Sox won 93 regular-season games and the American League East division title, but were swept in the 2016 American League Division Series by the eventual AL champions, the Cleveland Indians. In mid-October, Hazen resigned from the Red Sox to take an expanded role as executive vice president and general manager of the Arizona Diamondbacks. Dombrowski chose not to appoint a successor, assuming general manager responsibilities without the added title, and promoting other Red Sox executives to key supporting positions, including former MLB general managers Frank Wren and Allard Baird.

Prior to the 2017 season, Dombrowski acquired starting pitcher Chris Sale from the White Sox, in exchange for four prospects including Yoan Moncada. The 2017 Red Sox won their division again, but lost the 2017 American League Division Series to the eventual World Series champions, the Houston Astros. In October, Dombrowski fired John Farrell, who had served five years as Boston's manager. Later that month, Dombrowski hired Alex Cora, then bench coach of the Astros, to be the next Red Sox manager.

The 2018 Red Sox won their division for the third consecutive season; the team recorded 108 wins, the most in franchise history. The team went on to win the 2018 World Series, with a pitching staff led by players that Dombrowski had acquired—including Kimbrel, Price, and Sale—along with designated hitter J. D. Martinez, whom Dombrowski had acquired in February 2018. It was Dombrowski's first championship since he was general manager of the Marlins in 1997, and he was later named Executive of the Year by Baseball America, the second time he won the award. In June 2019, the National Polish-American Sports Hall of Fame awarded its Excellence in Sports Award to Dombrowski.

Dombrowski was fired by the Red Sox early on September 9, 2019, just 10 months after winning the 2018 World Series, following a 10–5 loss to the New York Yankees, which dropped Boston's record for the season to 76–67. During his time leading baseball operations, the Red Sox were fined for participating in electronic sign stealing against the Yankees in 2017, and improper use of video replay to decode signs during the 2018 season. Following an MLB investigation into the 2018 allegations, findings released in February 2020 did not implicate Dombrowski in any wrongdoing.

=== Philadelphia Phillies ===
On December 11, 2020, Dombrowski was named the president of baseball operations of the Philadelphia Phillies. After missing the playoffs in 2021, the 2022 Phillies qualified for the postseason as a wild card team and secured the National League pennant, where they lost to the Houston Astros in six games in the World Series. It was Dombrowski's first league title with Philadelphia and fifth overall of his executive career.

On November 22, 2022, the Phillies signed Dombrowski to a contract extension that runs through the 2027 season.

=== Record as general manager / president of baseball operations ===
As of October 14th, 2026.

Team	Year	Regular season					Postseason			
Team	Year	Games	Won	Lost	Win %	Finish	Won	Lost	Win %	Result
MON	1988	81	41	40	.506	3rd in NL East	–	–	–	–
MON	1989	162	81	81	.500	4th in NL East	–	–	–	–
MON	1990	162	85	77	.525	3rd in NL East	–	–	–	–
MON	1991	145	64	81	.441	(resigned)	–	–	–	–
MON total		550	271	279	.493		–	–	–	–
FLA	1993	162	64	98	.395	6th in NL East	–	–	–	–
FLA	1994	115	51	64	.443	5th in NL East	–	–	–	–
FLA	1995	143	67	76	.469	4th in NL East	–	–	–	–
FLA	1996	162	80	82	.494	3rd in NL East	–	–	–	–
FLA	1997	162	92	70	.568	2nd in NL East	11	5	.688	Won World Series (CLE)
FLA	1998	162	54	108	.333	5th in NL East	–	–	–	–
FLA	1999	162	64	98	.395	5th in NL East	–	–	–	–
FLA	2000	161	79	82	.491	3rd in NL East	–	–	–	–
FLA	2001	162	76	86	.469	4th in NL East	–	–	–	–
FLA total		1,391	627	764	.451		11	5	.688	
DET	2002	155	55	100	.355	5th in AL Central	–	–	–	–
DET	2003	162	43	119	.265	5th in AL Central	–	–	–	–
DET	2004	162	72	90	.444	4th in AL Central	–	–	–	–
DET	2005	162	71	91	.438	4th in AL Central	–	–	–	–
DET	2006	162	95	67	.586	2nd in AL Central	8	5	.615	Lost World Series (STL)
DET	2007	162	88	74	.543	2nd in AL Central	–	–	–	–
DET	2008	162	74	88	.457	5th in AL Central	–	–	–	–
DET	2009	163	86	77	.528	2nd in AL Central	–	–	–	–
DET	2010	162	81	81	.500	3rd in AL Central	–	–	–	–
DET	2011	162	95	67	.586	1st in AL Central	5	6	.455	Lost ALCS (TEX)
DET	2012	162	88	74	.543	1st in AL Central	7	6	.538	Lost World Series (SF)
DET	2013	162	93	69	.574	1st in AL Central	5	6	.455	Lost ALCS (BOS)
DET	2014	162	90	72	.556	1st in AL Central	0	3	.000	Lost ALDS (BAL)
DET	2015	105	51	54	.486	(fired)	–	–	–	–
DET total		2,205	1,082	1,123	.491		25	26	.490	
BOS	2015	44	26	18	.591	5th in AL East	–	–	–	–
BOS	2016	162	93	69	.574	1st in AL East	0	3	.000	Lost ALDS (CLE)
BOS	2017	162	93	69	.574	1st in AL East	1	3	.250	Lost ALDS (HOU)
BOS	2018	162	108	54	.667	1st in AL East	10	4	.714	Won World Series (LAD)
BOS	2019	143	76	67	.531	(fired)	–	–	–	–
BOS total		673	396	277	.588		11	10	.524	
PHI	2021	162	82	80	.506	2nd in NL East	–	–	–	–
PHI	2022	162	87	75	.537	3rd in NL East	11	6	.647	Lost World Series (HOU)
PHI	2023	162	90	72	.556	2nd in NL East	8	5	.615	Lost NLCS (ARI)
PHI	2024	162	95	67	.586	1st in NL East	1	3	.250	Lost NLDS (NYM)
PHI	2025	162	96	66	.593	1st in NL East	1	3	.250	Lost NLDS (LAD)
PHI	2026	162	88	74	.543	2nd in NL East	1	2	.333	Lost Wild Card (ATL)
PHI total		950	529	421	.557		21	17	.553	
Total		5,607	2,800	2,797	.500		68	58	.540	

== Personal life ==
Dombrowski grew up in Palos Heights, Illinois, and graduated from Harold L. Richards High School in Oak Lawn, Illinois.

Dombrowski briefly attended Cornell University, where he was a member of the Big Red football team. He later transferred to Western Michigan University, where he earned a degree in business administration in 1979. Dombrowski would later be the recipient of Western Michigan University's Distinguished Alumni Award in 1998. In 2018, Dombrowski was honored with the National Polish-American Sports Hall of Fame Excellence in Sports Award, in Troy, Michigan.

Dombrowski is married to Karie Ross, who worked as an ESPN reporter from 1988 to 1990. They met in 1992 while Dombrowski was serving as general manager of the Florida Marlins and Ross was a reporter at WTVJ in Miami. The couple has two children, Darbi and Landon.

Sporting positions
Preceded by Bill Stoneman	Montreal Expos general manager 1987–1991	Succeeded by Dan Duquette
Preceded by Franchise created	Florida Marlins general manager 1991–2001	Succeeded by Larry Beinfest
Preceded by Don Smiley	Florida Marlins president 2000–2001	Succeeded by David Samson
Preceded by Mike Ilitch	Detroit Tigers president 2001–2015	Succeeded by Chris Granger
Preceded by Randy Smith	Detroit Tigers general manager 2002–2015	Succeeded by Al Avila
