= Jeremy Hernandez =

American baseball player (born 1966)

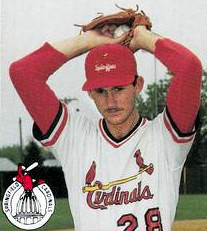
- Hernandez in 1988
- Pitcher
- Born: July 6, 1966 (age 60); Burbank, California, U.S.
- Batted: Right Threw: Right

MLB debut
- September 2, 1991, for the San Diego Padres

Last MLB appearance
- September 27, 1995, for the Florida Marlins

MLB statistics
- Win–loss record: 10–14
- Earned run average: 3.64
- Strikeouts: 122
- Stats at Baseball Reference

Teams
- San Diego Padres (1991–1993); Cleveland Indians (1993); Florida Marlins (1994–1995)

Jeremy Stuart Hernandez (born July 6, 1966) is an American former Major League Baseball pitcher. Hernandez, who is of Mexican descent, played in five seasons in the major leagues, from 1991 until 1995. During that time, he pitched in 133 games, all in relief.
