= Eric Helfand =

American baseball player (born 1969)

- Catcher
- Born: March 25, 1969 (age 56); Erie, Pennsylvania, U.S.
- Batted: Left Threw: Right

MLB debut
- September 4, 1993, for the Oakland Athletics

Last MLB appearance
- September 30, 1995, for the Oakland Athletics

MLB statistics
- Batting average: .171
- Home runs: 0
- Runs batted in: 9
- Stats at Baseball Reference

Teams
- Oakland Athletics (1993–1995)

Eric James Helfand (born March 25, 1969) is an American former Major League Baseball catcher. He played for the Oakland Athletics from 1993 to 1995. He was later signed to a minor league contract by the Cleveland Indians after the 1995 season, and was eventually signed to another minor league contract to the Anaheim Angels in 1998 and participated in spring training.

He was born in Erie, Pennsylvania, and attended Patrick Henry High School in San Diego, California, University of Nebraska–Lincoln in Lincoln, Nebraska, and Arizona State University in Tempe, Arizona. He is Jewish, and appeared in a 2003 Jewish Sports Review of All Time Jewish Major Leaguers.
