= Jesús Tavárez =

Dominican baseball player (born 1971)

- Outfielder
- Born: March 26, 1971 (age 54); Santo Domingo, Dominican Republic
- Batted: Both Threw: Right

MLB debut
- May 23, 1994, for the Florida Marlins

Last MLB appearance
- June 15, 1998, for the Baltimore Orioles

MLB statistics
- Batting average: .239
- Home runs: 3
- Runs batted in: 33
- Stats at Baseball Reference

Teams
- Florida Marlins (1994–1996); Boston Red Sox (1997); Baltimore Orioles (1998); Haitai Tigers (2000–2001)

Jesús Rafael Tavárez Alcántaras (born March 26, 1971) is a Dominican former professional baseball outfielder and current manager of the Dominican Summer League Guardians Blue, a Rookie-level affiliate of the Cleveland Guardians. He played five seasons in Major League Baseball, playing mainly in center field for three different teams from 1994-1998 seasons. He also played two seasons for the Haitai Tigers of the KBO League. Listed at 6' 0", 170 lb., he was a switch-hitter and threw right-handed.

Tavárez entered the majors in 1994 with the Florida Marlins, playing for them three years before joining the Boston Red Sox (1997) and Baltimore Orioles (1998). His most productive season came in 1995 with the Marlins, when he posted career-numbers in batting average (.289), home runs (2), runs (31), RBI (13) and stolen bases (7). The next season, he appeared in a career-high 98 games, while hitting just .219.

In a five-season career, Tavárez was a .239 hitter (101-for-228) with three home runs and 33 RBI in 228 games, including 12 doubles, three triples and 13 stolen bases. He also played in the Seattle, Florida, Boston, Baltimore and San Francisco minor league systems from 1990–99, hitting .274 with 22 home runs and 259 RBI in 741 games.

== See also ==
- Players from Dominican Republic in Major League Baseball
