= John Johnstone (baseball) =

American baseball player (born 1968)

- Pitcher
- Born: November 25, 1968 (age 57); Liverpool, New York, U.S.
- Batted: Right Threw: Right

MLB debut
- September 3, 1993, for the Florida Marlins

Last MLB appearance
- September 30, 2000, for the San Francisco Giants

MLB statistics
- Win–loss record: 15–19
- Earned run average: 4.01
- Strikeouts: 234
- Stats at Baseball Reference

Teams
- Florida Marlins (1993–1995); Houston Astros (1996); San Francisco Giants (1997, 1997–2000); Oakland Athletics (1997)

John William Johnstone (born November 25, 1968) is an American former professional baseball pitcher. He played in Major League Baseball (MLB) for the Florida Marlins, Houston Astros, San Francisco Giants, and Oakland Athletics.

== Career ==
=== Minor leagues ===
Johnstone was chosen in the 20th round of the 1987 Major League Baseball draft by the New York Mets. He joined the Kingsport Mets in the rookie-level Appalachian League for the remainder of the season after his selection, and went 1-1 with a 7.45 ERA with a 2.14 WHIP over 17 games. The following season he remained at the rookie level, and played for the Gulf Coast League Mets. He improved his ERA to 2.68, going 3-4 with a 2.69 ERA and a 1.22 WHIP.

In 1989, Johnstone played with the Pittsfield Mets in the single-A New York-Penn League, posting an 11-2 record, a 2.77 ERA, and a 1.24 WHIP. In 1990 he was promoted to the high-A St. Lucie Mets in the Florida State League, where he went 15-6 with a 2.24 ERA and a 1.19 WHIP.

In 1991 and 1992, Johnstone played at the double-A level in the Eastern League, first with the Williamsport Bills (27 starts, 7-9, 3.97, 165.1 IP, 100 SO, 1.44 WHIP), then with the Binghamton Mets (24 starts, 7-7, 2.75, 149.1 IP, 121 SO, 1.13 WHIP). After the season, he was drafted by the Marlins with the 31st pick in the expansion draft.

=== MLB career ===
Johnstone started out the 1993 season with the triple-A Edmonton Trappers, going 4-15 with a 5.18 ERA and a 1.57 WHIP in the Pacific Coast League. Despite these alarming figures, Florida called him up to join the parent club for the last month of the inaugural season. On September 3, he made his MLB debut and took the loss, allowing an earned run in the 13th inning of a 5–4 decision against the Los Angeles Dodgers. He totaled 10.2 innings for the Fish, striking out five and allowing 16 hits and seven walks. He had a 5.91 ERA and a 2.156 WHIP to go with his 0-2 record.

In 1994, Johnstone played most of the campaign back in Edmonton, going 5-3 with a 4.46 ERA in 29 games, striking out 43 in 42.1 innings along with a much improved 1.30 WHIP. He joined the Marlins in late-June and stayed with Florida through mid-August. He did not allow an earned run through his first seven appearances, spanning eight innings. Opponents during that streak hit just .107 against him, with a .372 OPS. He had an enviable 0.303 WHIP during that stretch. He earned his first career win on July 1 when he pitched the 10th and 11th inning of a 4-3 win over the Atlanta Braves, striking out two and allowing zero hits. In total, he pitched in 17 games for the Marlins, going 1-2 with a 5.91 ERA, a 1.828 WHIP, and 23 strikeouts in 21.1 innings.

In 1995, Johnstone appeared in four games for the Marlins near the beginning of the season, and give up two earned runs over 4.2 innings. He strained his right elbow and was out for the season on May 8, and the Marlins granted his free agency after the season closed. He signed on with the Houston Astros a few days later.

Johnstone labored at the triple-A level with the PCL's Tucson Toros in 1996, putting up a 3-3 record and a 3.42 ERA in 45 games. He appeared in nine games with the Astros in the middle of the season, earning a 1-0 record and allowing 17 hits in 13 innings with a 5.54 ERA.

In 1997, Johnstone signed a free agent contract to play with the San Francisco Giants. Most of his time in the organization would see him with the Phoenix Firebirds in the PCL. He played 38 games in Phoenix, going 0-3, 4.03 over 38 innings. He spent the month of July with San Francisco, getting into 10 games and racking up a 2.16 ERA over 16.2 innings, with 14 strikeouts and a 1.080 WHIP. The Giants waived him on August 7, and he joined the Oakland Athletics. After five appearances over three weeks (6.1 innings, 2.84 ERA, 2.211 WHIP), he was again granted free agency, and signed back on with the Giants. He got into three more games that season for San Francisco, pitching two innings.

In 1998, Johnstone appeared in a career-high and team-second 70 games, going 6-5 with a 3.07 ERA and a 1.250 WHIP, striking out 86 in 88 innings. He earned an opening day victory on March 31, pitching two shutout innings at the end of a 12-inning 9-4 win over the Houston Astros. On June 9, he struck out three in 1.2 shutout innings, earning another win in a 7-6 triumph over the Seattle Mariners.

Johnstone went 4-6 with a 2.60 ERA in 1999 for the Giants, appearing in 62 contests and striking out 56 in 65.2 innings. He logged a career best 1.036 WHIP. He did not allow an earned run through his first 15 appearances, a span lasting 13.2 innings. Opponents hit just .133 over that time, and struck out nine times. On July 22, he struck out five of the six batters he faced in the seventh and eighth inning of an 8-7 loss to the San Diego Padres. He pitched three perfect innings, striking out two on July 25 in a 13-innings, 2-1 loss to the Cincinnati Reds.

In 2000, Johnstone played in 47 games for the Giants, going 3-4 with a 6.30 ERA and a 1.540 WHIP. He landed on the DL in mid-July for a back injury, eventually getting surgery and effectively ending his career.

=== Later life ===
Johnstone was the varsity baseball head coach at his alma mater, Bishop Ludden Jr./Sr. High School, from 2016 to 2018.

In 2012, Johnstone was inducted into the Greater Syracuse Sports Hall of Fame.
