= Bryan Harvey =

American baseball player (born 1963)

- Pitcher
- Born: June 2, 1963 (age 63); Soddy-Daisy, Tennessee, U.S.
- Batted: Right Threw: Right

MLB debut
- May 16, 1987, for the California Angels

Last MLB appearance
- April 28, 1995, for the Florida Marlins

MLB statistics
- Win–loss record: 17–25
- Earned run average: 2.49
- Strikeouts: 448
- Saves: 177
- Stats at Baseball Reference

Teams
- California Angels (1987–1992); Florida Marlins (1993–1995)

Career highlights and awards
- 2× All-Star (1991, 1993); AL Rolaids Relief Man Award (1991); AL saves leader (1991)

Bryan Stanley Harvey (born June 2, 1963) is an American former professional baseball relief pitcher who played nine seasons in Major League Baseball (MLB). He played for the California Angels of the American League and the Florida Marlins of the National League.

== Career ==
Harvey attended Bandys High School in Catawba, North Carolina, and the University of North Carolina at Charlotte. At Charlotte, Harvey pitched a team-leading 52 strikeouts in 1982 as a freshman.

Not selected in the 1985 Major League Baseball draft, Harvey began his pro baseball career with the California Angels farm system, starting in 1985 with the Quad Cities Angels then the Palm Springs Angels in 1986.

Harvey was elected to the All-Star team for the American League in 1991 and for the National League in 1993. He led the American League in saves in 1991 with 46. That year, Harvey also became the first pitcher to record 40 saves and 100 strikeouts in one season. He finished second in the 1988 American League Rookie of the Year balloting and was named Rookie Pitcher of the Year by The Sporting News.

Harvey was a member of the inaugural Florida Marlins team that began play in Major League Baseball in 1993.

Harvey's pitching repertoire featured a low-90s fastball and a forkball, delivered overhand with a big shoulder turn.

== Family ==
One of his sons, Hunter Harvey, was drafted by the Baltimore Orioles in 2013 and made his major league debut for them on August 17, 2019. Another son, Kris Harvey, played in the minor leagues for the Pittsburgh Pirates organization.

== See also ==
- List of Major League Baseball annual saves leaders
