= Darrell Whitmore =

American baseball player (born 1968)

- Outfielder
- Born: November 18, 1968 (age 58); Front Royal, Virginia, U.S.
- Batted: Left Threw: Right

Professional debut
- MLB: June 25, 1993, for the Florida Marlins
- NPB: June 23, 1996, for the Chiba Lotte Marines

Last appearance
- MLB: June 3, 1995, for the Florida Marlins
- NPB: October 6, 1996, for the Chiba Lotte Marines

MLB statistics
- Batting average: .203
- Home runs: 5
- Runs batted in: 21

NPB statistics
- Batting average: .266
- Home runs: 12
- Runs batted in: 29
- Stats at Baseball Reference

Teams
- Florida Marlins (1993–1995); Chiba Lotte Marines (1996)

Darrell Lamont Whitmore (born November 18, 1968) is an American former professional baseball player for the Florida Marlins of Major League Baseball (MLB) and was a college football and baseball player for the West Virginia Mountaineers.

== Career ==
=== College career ===
Darrell Whitmore played football and baseball at West Virginia University. Whitemore started his football career in 1988 as a freshman free safety. He was a standout throughout the Mountaineers' undefeated season until he broke his leg in West Virginia's final regular season game against Syracuse University. His injury was one of the factors in West Virginia's loss to the University of Notre Dame in the 1989 Fiesta Bowl. Whitmore's freshman season ended with 61 tackles, two fumble recoveries, one forced fumble, and four interceptions. Whitmore also returned one of his interceptions 34 yards for a touchdown, his only career score.

As a sophomore, in 1989, Whitmore posted 68 tackles, a fumble recovery, and three interceptions. The next season, his junior year of 1990, Whitmore recorded 64 total tackles, a forced fumble, and four interceptions. In his final collegiate season, Whitmore posted a career-low 23 tackles and three interceptions.

Whitmore totaled 216 tackles and 14 interceptions in his four-year career as a free safety. As a baseball player, Whitmore became one of the greatest pure hitters in school history while playing right field.

=== Major League Baseball ===
Whitmore was drafted 46th overall, in the second round of the 1990 Major League Baseball draft by the Cleveland Indians. Whitmore was signed June 13, 1990. The Florida Marlins selected Whitmore as the 16th pick in the November 1992 Major League Baseball expansion draft. He made his MLB debut with the Marlins on June 25, 1993. Whitmore played three years in the major leagues, from 1993 to 1995. From 1996-2001, he played in affiliated AAA ball for various clubs.

Whitmore played 112 games in his Major League career, totaling 5 home runs and 67 hits and 21 RBIs. Additionally, he appeared briefly with Nippon Professional Baseball's Chiba Lotte Marines in 1996, hitting 12 home runs and batting at a .266 average in 57 games.
