= Alex Arias =

American baseball player (born 1967)

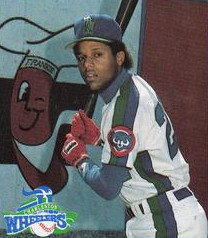
- Arias in 1988
- Infielder
- Born: November 20, 1967 (age 58); New York, New York, U.S.
- Batted: Right Threw: Right

MLB debut
- May 12, 1992, for the Chicago Cubs

Last MLB appearance
- September 22, 2002, for the New York Yankees

MLB statistics
- Batting average: .265
- Home runs: 18
- Run batted in: 196
- Stats at Baseball Reference

Teams
- Chicago Cubs (1992); Florida Marlins (1993–1997); Philadelphia Phillies (1998–2000); San Diego Padres (2001); New York Yankees (2002)

Career highlights and awards
- World Series champion (1997)

Alejandro Arias (born November 20, 1967) is an American former professional baseball infielder. He played in Major League Baseball (MLB) from 1992 to 2002 for the Chicago Cubs, Florida Marlins, Philadelphia Phillies, San Diego Padres, and New York Yankees.

In his career, Arias played for the Chicago Cubs (1992), Florida Marlins (1993–1997), Philadelphia Phillies (1998–2000), San Diego Padres (2001) and New York Yankees (2002).

He had the highest career batting average as a pinch hitter with over 150 at-bats, with a .320 average. His .265 career average and .338 on-base percentage are about average.
