= 1994 Boston Red Sox season =

Major League Baseball season

1994 Boston Red Sox
- League: American League
- Division: East
- Ballpark: Fenway Park
- City: Boston, Massachusetts
- Record: 54–61 (.470)
- Divisional place: 4th
- Owners: JRY Trust
- President: John Harrington
- General manager: Dan Duquette
- Manager: Butch Hobson
- Television: WSBK-TV, Ch. 38 (Sean McDonough, Bob Montgomery); NESN (Bob Kurtz, Jerry Remy)
- Radio: WRKO (Jerry Trupiano, Joe Castiglione); WROL (Bobby Serrano, Hector Martinez)
- Stats: ESPN.com; Baseball Reference

The 1994 Boston Red Sox season was the 94th season in the franchise's Major League Baseball history. The season was cut short by the 1994–95 Major League Baseball strike, and there was no postseason. When the strike started on August 12, the Red Sox were in fourth place in the American League East with a record of 54–61, seventeen games behind the New York Yankees.

== Offseason ==
- December 7, 1993: Otis Nixon was signed as a free agent by the Red Sox.
- February 1, 1994: Damon Berryhill was signed as a free agent by the Red Sox.
- February 10, 1994: Sergio Valdez was signed as a free agent by the Red Sox.
- March 29, 1994: Todd Frohwirth was signed as a free agent by the Red Sox.

== Regular season ==
Record by month
Month	Record		Cumulative		AL East		Ref.
Month	Won	Lost	Won	Lost	Position	GB	Ref.
April	17	7	17	7	1st	+1 1/2	
May	13	12	30	19	2nd	3 1/2	
June	8	19	38	38	3rd	9 1/2	
July	12	15	50	53	3rd	14 1/2	
August	4	8	54	61	4th	17	
Season ended due to players' strike							

On July 8, shortstop John Valentin executed an unassisted triple play in the sixth inning of a game against the Seattle Mariners—Valentin caught a line drive, touched second base, and tagged the runner coming from first base. Alex Rodriguez made his major league debut in the same game, going hitless in three at bats.

=== Season standings ===
This was the first season that the American League was structured with three divisions, with a realignment creating the AL Central. As a result, the AL East was reduced from seven teams to five. With three divisions, this was scheduled to be the first season with a wild card team advancing to the postseason. However, due to a players' strike, the season ended in August, and there was no postseason.

AL East
Team	W	L	Pct.	GB	Home	Road
New York Yankees	70	43	.619	—	33‍–‍24	37‍–‍19
Baltimore Orioles	63	49	.562	6½	28‍–‍27	35‍–‍22
Toronto Blue Jays	55	60	.478	16	33‍–‍26	22‍–‍34
Boston Red Sox	54	61	.470	17	31‍–‍33	23‍–‍28
Detroit Tigers	53	62	.461	18	34‍–‍24	19‍–‍38

==== Wild Card standings ====
Division leaders
Team	W	L	Pct.
New York Yankees	70	43	.619
Chicago White Sox	67	46	.593
Texas Rangers	52	62	.456

Wild Card team (Top team qualifies for postseason)
Team	W	L	Pct.	GB
Cleveland Indians	66	47	.584	—
Baltimore Orioles	63	49	.562	2½
Kansas City Royals	64	51	.557	3
Toronto Blue Jays	55	60	.478	12
Boston Red Sox	54	61	.470	13
Minnesota Twins	53	60	.469	13
Detroit Tigers	53	62	.461	14
Milwaukee Brewers	53	62	.461	14
Oakland Athletics	51	63	.447	15½
Seattle Mariners	49	63	.438	16½
California Angels	47	68	.409	20

=== Record vs. opponents ===
1994 American League record Source: MLB Standings Grid – 1994
Team	BAL	BOS	CAL	CWS	CLE	DET	KC	MIL	MIN	NYY	OAK	SEA	TEX	TOR
Baltimore	—	4–2	8–4	2–4	4–6	3–4	4–1	7–3	4–5	4–6	7–5	4–6	3–3	7–2
Boston	2–4	—	7–5	2–4	3–7	4–2	4–2	5–5	1–8	3–7	9–3	6–6	1–5	7–3
California	4–8	5–7	—	5–5	0–5	3–4	6–4	3–3	3–3	4–8	3–6	2–7	6–4	3–4
Chicago	4–2	4–2	5–5	—	7–5	8–4	3–7	9–3	2–4	4–2	6–3	9–1	4–5	2–3
Cleveland	6–4	7–3	5–0	5–7	—	8–2	1–4	5–2	9–3	0–9	6–0	3–2	5–7	6–4
Detroit	4–3	2–4	4–3	4–8	2–8	—	4–8	6–4	3–3	3–3	5–4	6–3	5–7	5–4
Kansas City	1–4	2–4	4–6	7–3	4–1	8–4	—	5–7	6–4	4–2	7–3	6–4	4–3	6–6
Milwaukee	3–7	5–5	3–3	3–9	2–5	4–6	7–5	—	6–6	2–7	4–1	4–2	3–3	7–3
Minnesota	5–4	8–1	3–3	4–2	3–9	3–3	4–6	6–6	—	4–5	2–5	3–3	4–5	4–8
New York	6–4	7–3	8–4	2–4	9–0	3–3	2–4	7–2	5–4	—	7–5	8–4	3–2	3–4
Oakland	5–7	3–9	6–3	3–6	0–6	4–5	3–7	1–4	5–2	5–7	—	4–3	7–3	5–1
Seattle	4–6	6–6	7–2	1–9	2–3	3–6	4–6	2–4	3–3	4–8	3–4	—	9–1	1–5
Texas	3–3	5–1	4–6	5–4	7–5	7–5	3–4	3–3	5–4	2–3	3–7	1–9	—	4–8
Toronto	2–7	3–7	4–3	3–2	4–6	4–5	6–6	3–7	8–4	4–3	1–5	5–1	8–4	—

=== Notable transactions ===
- April 9, 1994: Mario Díaz was signed as a free agent by the Red Sox.
- May 25, 1994: Mario Díaz was released by the Red Sox.
- May 31, 1994: Billy Hatcher and Paul Quantrill were traded by the Red Sox to the Philadelphia Phillies for Wes Chamberlain and Mike Sullivan.
- June 2, 1994: Nomar Garciaparra was drafted by the Red Sox in the 1st round (12th pick) of the 1994 MLB draft. Player signed July 20, 1994.
- June 2, 1994: Donnie Sadler was drafted by the Red Sox in the 11th round of the 1994 MLB draft. Player signed June 8, 1994.
- June 27, 1994: Greg A. Harris was released by the Red Sox.

=== Opening Day lineup ===
2	Otis Nixon	CF
22	Billy Hatcher	RF
39	Mike Greenwell	LF
42	Mo Vaughn	1B
10	Andre Dawson	DH
34	Scott Cooper	3B
13	John Valentin	SS
23	Dave Valle	C
5	Scott Fletcher	2B
21	Roger Clemens	P

=== Roster ===
1994 Boston Red Sox
Roster
Pitchers: 43 Cory Bailey; 29 Scott Bankhead; 21 Roger Clemens; 44 Danny Darwin; 41 Steve Farr; 46 Gar Finnvold; 48 Tony Fossas; 35 Todd Frohwirth; 27 Greg Harris; 55 Joe Hesketh; 31 Chris Howard; 19 José Meléndez; 57 Nate Minchey; 49 Chris Nabholz; 49 Paul Quantrill; 25 Jeff Russell; 50 Ken Ryan; 36 Aaron Sele; 15 Ricky Trlicek; 40 Sergio Valdéz; 53 Tim Van Egmond; 16 Frank Viola	Catchers: 6 Damon Berryhill; 18 Rich Rowland; 23 Dave Valle; Infielders: 34 Scott Cooper; 5 Scott Fletcher; 28 Greg Litton; 11 Tim Naehring; 3 Carlos Rodríguez; 27 Stan Royer; 13 John Valentin; 42 Mo Vaughn	Outfielders: 47 Greg Blosser; 23 Tom Brunansky; 26 Wes Chamberlain; 39 Mike Greenwell; 22 Billy Hatcher; 2 Otis Nixon; 38 Lee Tinsley; 30 Andy Tomberlin; 28 Bob Zupcic; Other batters: 10 Andre Dawson; 51 Luis Ortiz; 22 Eric Wedge	Manager: 17 Butch Hobson; Coaches: 32 Gary Allenson (Third base); 45 Mike Easler (Hitting); 33 Mike Roarke (Pitching); 12 John Wathan (Bullpen); 20 Frank White (First base)

== Player stats ==
=== Batting ===
==== Starters by position ====
Note: Pos = Position; G = Games played; AB = At bats; H = Hits; Avg. = Batting average; HR = Home runs; RBI = Runs batted in

Pos	Player	G	AB	H	Avg.	HR	RBI
C	Damon Berryhill	82	255	67	.263	6	34
1B	Mo Vaughn	111	394	122	.310	26	82
2B	Tim Naehring	80	297	82	.276	7	42
3B	Scott Cooper	104	369	104	.282	13	53
SS	John Valentin	84	301	95	.316	9	49
LF	Mike Greenwell	95	327	88	.269	11	45
CF	Otis Nixon	103	398	109	.274	0	25
RF	Billy Hatcher	44	164	40	.244	1	18
DH	Andre Dawson	75	292	70	.240	16	48

==== Other batters ====
Note: G = Games played; AB = At bats; H = Hits; Avg. = Batting average; HR = Home runs; RBI = Runs batted in

Player	G	AB	H	Avg.	HR	RBI
Scott Fletcher	63	185	42	.227	3	11
Tom Brunansky	48	177	42	.237	10	34
Carlos Rodriguez	57	174	50	.287	1	13
Wes Chamberlain	51	164	42	.256	4	20
Lee Tinsley	78	144	32	.222	2	14
Rich Rowland	46	118	27	.229	9	20
Dave Valle	30	76	12	.158	1	5
Andy Tomberlin	17	36	7	.194	1	1
Greg Litton	11	21	2	.095	0	1
Luis Ortiz	7	18	3	.167	0	6
Greg Blosser	5	11	1	.091	0	1
Stan Royer	4	9	1	.111	0	1
Eric Wedge	2	6	0	.000	0	0
Bob Zupcic	4	4	0	.000	0	0

=== Pitching ===
==== Starting pitchers ====
Note: G = Games pitched; IP = Innings pitched; W = Wins; L = Losses; ERA = Earned run average; SO = Strikeouts

Player	G	IP	W	L	ERA	SO
Roger Clemens	24	170.2	9	7	2.85	168
Aaron Sele	22	143.1	8	7	3.83	105
Joe Hesketh	25	114.0	8	5	4.26	83
Danny Darwin	13	75.2	7	5	6.30	54
Chris Nabholz	8	42.0	3	4	6.64	23

==== Primary relief pitchers ====
Note: G = Games pitched; W = Wins; L = Losses; SV = Saves; ERA = Earned run average; SO = Strikeouts

Player	G	W	L	SV	ERA	SO
Tony Fossas	44	2	0	1	4.76	31
Greg A. Harris	35	3	4	2	8.28	44
Chris Howard	37	1	0	1	3.63	22
Jeff Russell	29	0	5	12	5.14	18
Ken Ryan	42	2	3	13	2.44	32

==== Spot starters and secondary relief pitchers ====
Note: G = Games pitched; IP = Innings pitched; W = Wins; L = Losses; ERA = Earned run average; SO = Strikeouts

Player	G	IP	W	L	ERA	SO
Tim Van Egmond	7	38.1	2	3	6.34	22
Scott Bankhead	27	37.2	3	2	4.54	25
Frank Viola	6	37.2	1	1	4.65	9
Gar Finnvold	8	36.1	0	4	5.94	17
Todd Frohwirth	22	26.2	0	3	10.80	13
Paul Quantrill	17	23.0	1	1	3.52	15
Nate Minchey	6	23.0	2	3	8.61	15
Ricky Trlicek	12	22.1	1	1	8.06	7
José Meléndez	10	16.1	0	1	6.06	9
Sergio Valdez	12	14.1	0	1	8.16	4
Steve Farr	11	13.0	1	0	6.23	8
Cory Bailey	5	4.1	0	1	12.46	4
Andy Tomberlin	1	2.0	0	0	0.00	1

== Farm system ==
The Sarasota Red Sox replaced the Fort Lauderdale Red Sox as a Class A-Advanced affiliate.

Level	Team	League	Manager
AAA	Pawtucket Red Sox	International League	Buddy Bailey
AA	New Britain Red Sox	Eastern League	Jim Pankovits
A-Advanced	Lynchburg Red Sox	Carolina League	Mark Meleski
A-Advanced	Sarasota Red Sox	Florida State League	DeMarlo Hale
A-Short Season	Utica Blue Sox	New York–Penn League	Dave Holt
Rookie	GCL Red Sox	Gulf Coast League	Felix Maldonado

== Game log ==
Red Sox Win	Red Sox Loss	Game postponed	Clinched Playoff Spot	Clinched Division

1994 Boston Red Sox Season Game Log: 54–61 (Home: 31–33; Away: 23–28)
April: 17–7

#	Date	Opponent	Score	Win	Loss	Save	Stadium	Attendance	Record	Box/ Streak
1	April 4	Tigers	9–8	Bankhead (1–0)	Davis (0–1)	Russell (1)	Fenway Park	34,023	1–0	W1
2	April 6	Tigers	5–4	Trlicek (1–0)	Wells (0–1)	Russell (2)	Fenway Park	17,977	2–0	W2
3	April 7	Tigers	9–6	Darwin (1–0)	Belcher (0–1)	Harris (1)	Fenway Park	15,304	3–0	W3
4	April 8	@ White Sox	8–6	Fossas (1–0)	Assenmacher (0–1)	Russell (3)	Comiskey Park	42,890	4–0	W4
5	April 9	@ White Sox	5–6	McDowell (1–1)	Harris (0–1)	Hernandez (1)	Comiskey Park	27,429	4–1	L1
6	April 10	@ White Sox	0–8	Fernandez (1–1)	Hesketh (0–1)	—	Comiskey Park	23,848	4–2	L2
7	April 11	@ Royals	8–5 (10)	Quantrill (1–0)	Magnante (0–1)	—	Kauffman Stadium	15,883	5–2	W1
8	April 12	@ Royals	22–11	Darwin (2–0)	Appier (0–2)	—	Kauffman Stadium	13,968	6–2	W2
9	April 13	@ Royals	1–2	Brewer (1–0)	Russell (0–1)	—	Kauffman Stadium	15,845	6–3	L1
10	April 15	White Sox	5–3	Clemens (1–0)	Fernandez (1–2)	Russell (4)	Fenway Park	31,085	7–3	W1
11	April 17	White Sox	4–7	Sanderson (1–0)	Viola (0–1)	Hernandez (2)	Fenway Park	34,501	7–4	L1
12	April 18	White Sox	1–12	Álvarez (3–0)	Darwin (2–1)	—	Fenway Park	34,657	7–5	L2
13	April 19	Athletics	13–5	Sele (1–0)	Welch (0–1)	—	Fenway Park	21,745	8–5	W1
14	April 20	Athletics	2–0	Clemens (2–0)	Karsay (0–1)	—	Fenway Park	25,372	9–5	W2
15	April 21	Athletics	6–5	Bankhead (2–0)	Eckersley (0–2)	—	Fenway Park	28,032	10–5	W3
16	April 22	Angels	6–5	Harris (1–1)	Sampen (0–1)	—	Fenway Park	25,870	11–5	W4
17	April 23	Angels	5–3	Darwin (3–1)	Dopson (1–2)	Russell (5)	Fenway Park	33,889	12–5	W5
18	April 24	Angels	5–4	Sele (2–0)	Leftwich (0–3)	Russell (6)	Fenway Park	32,521	13–5	W6
19	April 25	@ Mariners	2–4	Johnson (2–1)	Clemens (2–1)	—	Kingdome	35,468	13–6	L1
20	April 26	@ Mariners	3–4 (10)	Ayala (2–1)	Harris (1–2)	—	Kingdome	14,093	13–7	L2
21	April 27	@ Athletics	1–0	Viola (1–1)	Darling (2–2)	Russell (7)	Oakland–Alameda County Coliseum	15,250	14–7	W1
22	April 28	@ Athletics	4–1	Darwin (4–1)	Van Poppel (0–3)	Russell (8)	Oakland–Alameda County Coliseum	17,142	15–7	W2
23	April 29	@ Angels	6–4	Sele (3–0)	Leftwich (0–4)	Ryan (1)	Anaheim Stadium	30,178	16–7	W3
24	April 30	@ Angels	4–1	Clemens (3–1)	Leiter (2–2)	Harris (2)	Anaheim Stadium	55,057	17–7	W4

May: 13–12

#	Date	Opponent	Score	Win	Loss	Save	Stadium	Attendance	Record	Box/ Streak
25	May 1	@ Angels	10–1	Hesketh (1–1)	Anderson (3–1)	—	Anaheim Stadium	34,810	18–7	W5
26	May 3	Mariners	7–6	Bankhead (3–0)	Fleming (2–4)	Ryan (2)	Fenway Park	23,309	19–7	W6
27	May 4	Mariners	4–2	Darwin (5–1)	Hibbard (1–2)	Frohwirth (1)	Fenway Park	24,807	20–7	W7
28	May 6	@ Yankees	1–3	Key (5–1)	Sele (3–1)	—	Yankee Stadium	30,970	20–8	L1
29	May 7	@ Yankees	5–6	Wickman (1–0)	Russell (0–2)	—	Yankee Stadium	44,712	20–9	L2
30	May 8	@ Yankees	4–8	Mulholland (4–2)	Quantrill (1–1)	Hitchcock (1)	Yankee Stadium	28,680	20–10	W3
31	May 9	Brewers	4–7	Ignasiak (1–0)	Darwin (5–2)	—	Fenway Park	21,844	20–11	L4
32	May 10	Brewers	5–9	Navarro (2–2)	Harris (1–3)	—	Fenway Park	20,473	20–12	L5
33	May 11	Brewers	7–1	Sele (4–1)	Eldred (3–4)	—	Fenway Park	21,471	21–12	W1
34	May 12	Brewers	3–1	Clemens (4–1)	Bones (3–2)	Russell (9)	Fenway Park	22,126	22–12	W2
35	May 13	Blue Jays	5–3	Hesketh (2–1)	Hentgen (5–3)	Ryan (3)	Fenway Park	32,579	23–12	W3
36	May 14	Blue Jays	11–2	Darwin (6–2)	Leiter (2–3)	—	Fenway Park	33,771	24–12	W4
37	May 17	@ Orioles	2–3	Mussina (7–1)	Clemens (4–2)	Smith (16)	Oriole Park at Camden Yards	47,420	24–13	L1
38	May 18	@ Orioles	5–2	Sele (5–1)	McDonald (7–2)	—	Oriole Park at Camden Yards	47,612	25–13	W1
39	May 19	@ Orioles	3–2	Darwin (7–2)	Fernandez (2–2)	Russell (10)	Oriole Park at Camden Yards	47,467	26–13	W2
40	May 20	@ Twins	2–21	Pulido (2–3)	Hesketh (2–2)	—	Metrodome	20,766	26–14	L1
41	May 21	@ Twins	0–1	Tapani (4–2)	Finnvold (0–1)	Aguilera (9)	Metrodome	28,457	26–15	L2
42	May 22	@ Twins	9–2	Clemens (5–2)	Deshaies (2–5)	—	Metrodome	21,971	27–15	W1
43	May 24	Indians	3–5	Morris (3–4)	Sele (5–2)	Shuey (1)	Fenway Park	29,696	27–16	L1
44	May 26	Indians	13–5	Hesketh (3–2)	Tavárez (0–1)	—	Fenway Park	28,380	28–16	W1
45	May 27	@ Rangers	3–4	Fajardo (1–0)	Frohwirth (0–1)	Carpenter (3)	The Ballpark at Arlington	43,761	28–17	L1
46	May 28	@ Rangers	3–2 (10)	Harris (2–3)	Carpenter (2–2)	Russell (11)	The Ballpark at Arlington	46,396	29–17	W1
47	May 29	@ Rangers	6–8	Rogers (6–3)	Darwin (7–2)	—	The Ballpark at Arlington	46,354	29–18	L1
48	May 30	Royals	6–5 (10)	Ryan (1–0)	Pichardo (0–2)	—	Fenway Park	33,341	30–18	W1
49	May 31	Royals	7–9	Gordon (5–3)	Hesketh (3–3)	Meacham (1)	Fenway Park	22,537	30–19	L1

June: 8–19

#	Date	Opponent	Score	Win	Loss	Save	Stadium	Attendance	Record	Box/ Streak
50	June 1	Royals	4–2	Fossas (2–0)	Magnante (1–2)	Russell (12)	Fenway Park	28,307	31–19	W1
51	June 3	Rangers	2–13	Hurst (1–1)	Finnvold (0–2)	—	Fenway Park	33,524	31–20	L1
52	June 4	Rangers	4–10	Rogers (7–3)	Darwin (7–4)	—	Fenway Park	32,325	31–21	L2
53	June 5	Rangers	7–10	Howell (3–1)	Russell (0–3)	—	Fenway Park	33,803	31–22	L3
54	June 6	@ Tigers	5–11	Belcher (4–8)	Hesketh (3–4)	—	Tiger Stadium	19,570	31–23	L4
55	June 7	@ Tigers	5–1	Clemens (6–2)	Wells (1–3)	—	Tiger Stadium	13,708	32–23	W1
56	June 8	@ Tigers	5–14	Gullickson (4–4)	Finnvold (0–3)	—	Tiger Stadium	17,414	32–24	L1
57	June 10	Orioles	7–10	Oquist (2–1)	Ryan (1–1)	Smith (24)	Fenway Park	33,673	32–25	L2
58	June 11	Orioles	2–5	Mussina (9–3)	Sele (5–3)	Mills (2)	Fenway Park	33,295	32–26	L3
59	June 12	Orioles	4–8	McDonald (9–4)	Minchey (0–1)	—	Fenway Park	32,280	32–27	L4
60	June 13	Twins	2–5	Deshaies (3–6)	Clemens (6–3)	Aguilera (13)	Fenway Park	29,159	32–28	L5
61	June 14	Twins	4–5	Stevens (2–1)	Finnvold (0–4)	Aguilera (14)	Fenway Park	27,874	32–29	L6
62	June 15	Twins	5–7	Erickson (6–5)	Darwin (7–5)	Aguilera (15)	Fenway Park	30,243	32–30	L7
63	June 16	@ Indians	6–7	Farr (1–1)	Russell (0–4)	—	Jacobs Field	41,631	32–31	L8
64	June 17	@ Indians	1–8	Martínez (5–4)	Minchey (0–2)	—	Jacobs Field	41,189	32–32	L9
65	June 18	@ Indians	2–8	Plunk (5–2)	Clemens (6–4)	—	Jacobs Field	41,759	32–33	L10
66	June 19	@ Indians	5–6	Morris (6–4)	Harris (2–4)	Shuey (5)	Jacobs Field	41,833	32–34	L11
67	June 20	@ Blue Jays	4–1	Hesketh (4–4)	Stottlemyre (5–4)	Fossas (1)	SkyDome	50,028	33–34	W1
68	June 21	@ Blue Jays	13–1	Sele (6–3)	Cornett (0–2)	—	SkyDome	49,460	34–34	W2
69	June 22	@ Blue Jays	3–2	Minchey (1–2)	Stewart (5–6)	Ryan (4)	SkyDome	50,288	35–34	W3
70	June 24	@ Brewers	4–3	Harris (3–4)	Fetters (1–4)	Ryan (5)	Milwaukee County Stadium	18,914	36–34	W4
71	June 25	@ Brewers	10–8 (12)	Ryan (2–1)	Henry (2–3)	—	Milwaukee County Stadium	35,234	37–34	W5
72	June 26	@ Brewers	4–5	Navarro (3–6)	Van Egmond (0–1)	Fetters (2)	Milwaukee County Stadium	29,414	37–35	L1
73	June 27	Yankees	1–5	Key (12–1)	Sele (6–4)	—	Fenway Park	33,204	37–36	L2
74	June 28	Yankees	4–10	Pérez (6–3)	Minchey (1–3)	—	Fenway Park	33,268	37–37	L3
75	June 29	Yankees	3–4 (10)	Howe (1–0)	Russell (0–5)	—	Fenway Park	32,704	37–38	L4
76	June 30	Yankees	6–5	Howard (1–0)	Wickman (3–3)	Ryan (6)	Fenway Park	32,967	38–38	W1

July: 12–15

#	Date	Opponent	Score	Win	Loss	Save	Stadium	Attendance	Record	Box/ Streak
77	July 1	Athletics	3–6	Darling (6–9)	Van Egmond (0–2)	—	Fenway Park	28,336	38–39	L1
78	July 2	Athletics	10–2	Sele (7–4)	Van Poppel (4–7)	—	Fenway Park	31,792	39–39	W1
79	July 3	Athletics	0–10	Witt (7–7)	Nabholz (0–2)	—	Fenway Park	30,943	39–40	L1
80	July 4	Angels	4–1	Clemens (7–4)	Leftwich (3–7)	—	Fenway Park	26,624	40–40	W1
81	July 5	Angels	3–10	Finley (6–8)	Hesketh (4–5)	—	Fenway Park	26,199	40–41	L1
82	July 6	Angels	6–10	Patterson (2–3)	Bailey (0–1)	—	Fenway Park	28,763	40–42	L2
83	July 7	Mariners	3–4 (10)	Johnson (10–4)	Ryan (2–2)	Ayala (12)	Fenway Park	33,249	40–43	L3
84	July 8	Mariners	4–3	Nabholz (1–2)	Risley (6–5)	Ryan (7)	Fenway Park	33,355	41–43	W1
85	July 9	Mariners	4–7	Bosio (4–10)	Valdez (0–1)	Ayala (13)	Fenway Park	33,092	41–44	L1
86	July 10	Mariners	9–2	Hesketh (5–5)	Converse (0–2)	—	Fenway Park	33,555	42–44	W1
87	July 14	@ Athletics	2–1	Clemens (8–4)	Van Poppel (5–8)	—	Oakland-Alameda County Coliseum	40,457	43–44	W2
88	July 15	@ Athletics	4–1	Nabholz (2–2)	Eckersley (2–4)	Ryan (8)	Oakland-Alameda County Coliseum	23,607	44–44	W3
89	July 16	@ Athletics	0–9	Darling (9–9)	Sele (7–5)	—	Oakland-Alameda County Coliseum	26,540	44–45	L1
90	July 17	@ Athletics	4–3	Farr (2–1)	Acre (4–1)	Ryan (9)	Oakland-Alameda County Coliseum	31,480	45–45	W1
91	July 18	@ Angels	4–13	Anderson (6–4)	Van Egmond (0–3)	—	Anaheim Stadium	17,019	45–46	L1
92	July 19	@ Angels	4–6	Langston (6–6)	Clemens (8–5)	Grahe (13)	Anaheim Stadium	20,335	45–47	L2
93	July 20	@ Angels	4–8	Leftwich (5–8)	Nabholz (2–3)	Springer (1)	Anaheim Stadium	17,180	45–48	L3
94	July 22	Mariners	3–6	Johnson (11–5)	Sele (7–6)	Ayala (15)	Fenway Park	11,776	45–49	L4
95	July 23 (1)	Mariners	6–5	Hesketh (6–5)	Fleming (6–11)	Ryan (10)	Fenway Park	—	46–49	W1
96	July 23 (2)	Mariners	3–6 (11)	Ayala (4–2)	Meléndez (0–1)	—	Fenway Park	17,168	46–50	L1
97	July 24	Mariners	8–2	Clemens (9–5)	Glinatsis (0–1)	—	Fenway Park	22,411	47–50	W1
98	July 26	@ Yankees	10–7	Nabholz (3–3)	Key (15–3)	—	Yankee Stadium	38,448	48–50	W2
99	July 27	@ Yankees	3–4 (11)	Wickman (5–3)	Ryan (2–3)	—	Yankee Stadium	42,482	48–51	L1
100	July 28	@ Yankees	1–0	Hesketh (7–5)	Kamieniecki (7–6)	Ryan (11)	Yankee Stadium	44,403	49–51	W1
101	July 29	Brewers	7–2	Van Egmond (1–3)	Miranda (1–4)	—	Fenway Park	33,528	50–51	W2
102	July 30	Brewers	1–5	Eldred (10–10)	Clemens (9–6)	Fetters (15)	Fenway Park	33,081	50–52	L1
103	July 31	Brewers	2–5	Navarro (4–7)	Nabholz (3–4)	Fetters (16)	Fenway Park	32,220	50–53	L2

August: 4–8

#	Date	Opponent	Score	Win	Loss	Save	Stadium	Attendance	Record	Box/ Streak
104	August 1 (1)	Blue Jays	2–6	Hentgen (13–7)	Sele (7–7)	—	Fenway Park	—	50–54	L3
105	August 1 (2)	Blue Jays	4–3	Minchey (2–3)	Cornett (1–3)	Ryan (12)	Fenway Park	33,429	51–54	W1
106	August 2	Blue Jays	6–7	Cox (1–1)	Bankhead (3–1)	Hall (15)	Fenway Park	32,976	51–55	L1
107	August 3	Blue Jays	7–2	Van Egmond (2–3)	Leiter (6–6)	—	Fenway Park	32,047	52–55	W1
108	August 4	Blue Jays	2–5	Stottlemyre (6–7)	Clemens (9–7)	Hall (16)	Fenway Park	33,199	52–56	L1
109	August 6 (1)	Indians	8–4	Sele (8–7)	Grimsley (4–2)	Howard (1)	Fenway Park	24,934	53–56	W1
110	August 6 (2)	Indians	0–7	Martínez (11–6)	Nabholz (3–5)	—	Fenway Park	32,405	53–57	L1
111	August 7 (1)	Indians	4–1	Hesketh (8–5)	Ogea (0–1)	Ryan (13)	Fenway Park	—	54–57	W1
112	August 7 (2)	Indians	10–15 (12)	Russell (1–6)	Frohwirth (0–2)	—	Fenway Park	34,523	54–58	L1
113	August 8	@ Twins	2–5	Tapani (11–7)	Trilicek (1–1)	Aguilera (23)	Metrodome	22,733	54–59	L2
114	August 9	@ Twins	3–4 (12)	Stevens (5–2)	Frohwirth (0–3)	—	Metrodome	21,429	54–60	L3
115	August 10	@ Twins	7–17	Deshaies (6–12)	Bankhead (3–2)	—	Metrodome	23,492	54–61	L4

== Awards and honors ==
- Andre Dawson, Hutch Award

All-Star Game

- Scott Cooper, reserve 3B
