= 1994 Oakland Athletics season =

1994 Oakland Athletics
- League: American League
- Division: West
- Ballpark: Oakland–Alameda County Coliseum
- City: Oakland, California
- Record: 51–63 (.447)
- Divisional place: 2nd
- Owners: Walter A. Haas, Jr.
- General managers: Sandy Alderson
- Managers: Tony La Russa
- Television: KRON-TV (Dick Stockton, Ray Fosse); Sports Channel Pacific (Ray Fosse, Greg Papa)
- Radio: KFRC (Bill King, Lon Simmons, Ray Fosse)

The 1994 Oakland Athletics' season was the team's 27th season in Oakland, California. It was also the 94th season in franchise history. The team finished second in the American League West with a record of 51–63.

The Athletics' 1994 campaign ranks among the most unusual in franchise history. A disastrous 1993 campaign, attributable mainly to inept pitching, had tempered expectations in Oakland; while several established stars (namely Dennis Eckersley, Bob Welch, Terry Steinbach, Mark McGwire, and a recently re-signed Rickey Henderson) remained with the team in 1994, questions about the starting rotation, bullpen, and infield kept expectations low.

The Athletics belied these low expectations with a 7–5 start. The team's pitching staff continued to hemorrhage runs (allowing 79 in 12 games); the staff was bailed out, however, by their red-hot offense (which scored 93 runs over the same span). On April 17 (the day of Oakland's seventh win), the A's were 1.5 games ahead of the second-place California Angels.

The Athletics' offense soon cooled down, however. This drop in production, combined with continued pitching woes, set the stage for a monumental collapse. Between April 19 and May 29, Oakland lost 31 games in 37 tries; at the end of this span, their record stood at 13–36. The A's, then firmly in last place, trailed the division-leading Angels (who also had a sub-.500 record) by nine games. Oakland continued to lose ground over the following two weeks; at their absolute nadir, the Athletics' 19–43 record trailed the division-leading Rangers (who had since overtaken the Angels) by 12.5 games.

The A's, instead, launched themselves back into contention with a turnaround. Over their next 22 games, the Athletics went 19–3; this surge raised their record to 38–46. Oakland's much-maligned pitching staff powered the resurgence; over the 22-game span, Athletics pitchers allowed 3.27 runs per game (while pitching six shutouts). The rest of the division struggled over the same span; as such, Oakland's 38th victory allowed it to pull within three games of the first-place Rangers. The A's cooled down in subsequent weeks; poor play from the rest of the division, however, allowed them to gain further ground. The team finished with a 51–63 record; despite being 12 games under .500, the A's were only one game behind the first-place Rangers. All four of the American League West's teams finished the strike-shortened season with losing records. This is the only such instance in MLB history.

The 1994 Players' strike ended the season (and the A's postseason hopes) entirely. While the Rangers would win their first-ever division title in 1996, the A's would have to wait until 2000 to return to the postseason.

== Offseason ==
- November 16, 1993: Mike Aldrete was signed as a free agent by the Athletics.
- December 13, 1993: Billy Taylor was signed as a free agent by the Athletics.
- December 17, 1993: Rickey Henderson was signed as a free agent by the Athletics.
- December 20, 1993: Kurt Abbott was traded by the Athletics to the Florida Marlins for Kerwin Moore.
- December 23, 1993: Dave Righetti was signed as a free agent by the Athletics.

== Regular season ==
Despite compiling a record of 51–63 by Friday, August 12, the Athletics were only one game behind the Texas Rangers for the lead in the AL West Division. They had scored 549 runs (4.82 per game) and allowed 589 runs (5.17 per game).

The Athletics finished the strike-shortened season 28th in triples, with just 13, but they led the Majors in sacrifice flies, with 51.

Despite walking an MLB-high 510 batters, the Athletics tied the Chicago White Sox for the most shutouts pitched, with 9.

=== Transactions ===
- April 27, 1994: Dave Righetti was released by the Athletics.
- April 30, 1994: Steve Sax was signed as a free agent by the Athletics.
- May 10, 1994: Jeff Schaefer was signed as a free agent by the Athletics.
- June 2, 1994: 1994 Major League Baseball draft
  - Jason Beverlin was drafted by the Athletics in the 4th round.
  - Tim Hudson was drafted by the Athletics in the 35th round, but did not sign.

=== Season standings ===
AL West
Team	W	L	Pct.	GB	Home	Road
Texas Rangers	52	62	.456	—	31‍–‍32	21‍–‍30
Oakland Athletics	51	63	.447	1	24‍–‍32	27‍–‍31
Seattle Mariners	49	63	.438	2	22‍–‍22	27‍–‍41
California Angels	47	68	.409	5½	23‍–‍40	24‍–‍28

Division leaders
Team	W	L	Pct.
New York Yankees	70	43	.619
Chicago White Sox	67	46	.593
Texas Rangers	52	62	.456

Wild Card team (Top team qualifies for postseason)
Team	W	L	Pct.	GB
Cleveland Indians	66	47	.584	—
Baltimore Orioles	63	49	.562	2½
Kansas City Royals	64	51	.557	3
Toronto Blue Jays	55	60	.478	12
Boston Red Sox	54	61	.470	13
Minnesota Twins	53	60	.469	13
Detroit Tigers	53	62	.461	14
Milwaukee Brewers	53	62	.461	14
Oakland Athletics	51	63	.447	15½
Seattle Mariners	49	63	.438	16½
California Angels	47	68	.409	20

=== Record vs. opponents ===
1994 American League record Source: MLB Standings Grid – 1994
Team	BAL	BOS	CAL	CWS	CLE	DET	KC	MIL	MIN	NYY	OAK	SEA	TEX	TOR
Baltimore	—	4–2	8–4	2–4	4–6	3–4	4–1	7–3	4–5	4–6	7–5	4–6	3–3	7–2
Boston	2–4	—	7–5	2–4	3–7	4–2	4–2	5–5	1–8	3–7	9–3	6–6	1–5	7–3
California	4–8	5–7	—	5–5	0–5	3–4	6–4	3–3	3–3	4–8	3–6	2–7	6–4	3–4
Chicago	4–2	4–2	5–5	—	7–5	8–4	3–7	9–3	2–4	4–2	6–3	9–1	4–5	2–3
Cleveland	6–4	7–3	5–0	5–7	—	8–2	1–4	5–2	9–3	0–9	6–0	3–2	5–7	6–4
Detroit	4–3	2–4	4–3	4–8	2–8	—	4–8	6–4	3–3	3–3	5–4	6–3	5–7	5–4
Kansas City	1–4	2–4	4–6	7–3	4–1	8–4	—	5–7	6–4	4–2	7–3	6–4	4–3	6–6
Milwaukee	3–7	5–5	3–3	3–9	2–5	4–6	7–5	—	6–6	2–7	4–1	4–2	3–3	7–3
Minnesota	5–4	8–1	3–3	4–2	3–9	3–3	4–6	6–6	—	4–5	2–5	3–3	4–5	4–8
New York	6–4	7–3	8–4	2–4	9–0	3–3	2–4	7–2	5–4	—	7–5	8–4	3–2	3–4
Oakland	5–7	3–9	6–3	3–6	0–6	4–5	3–7	1–4	5–2	5–7	—	4–3	7–3	5–1
Seattle	4–6	6–6	7–2	1–9	2–3	3–6	4–6	2–4	3–3	4–8	3–4	—	9–1	1–5
Texas	3–3	5–1	4–6	5–4	7–5	7–5	3–4	3–3	5–4	2–3	3–7	1–9	—	4–8
Toronto	2–7	3–7	4–3	3–2	4–6	4–5	6–6	3–7	8–4	4–3	1–5	5–1	8–4	—

=== Roster ===
1994 Oakland Athletics
Roster
Pitchers: 55 Mark Acre; 53 John Briscoe; 17 Ron Darling; 43 Dennis Eckersley; 26 Vince Horsman; 47 Miguel Jimenez; 50 Steve Karsay; 52 Dave Leiper; 58 Mike Mohler; 52 Edwin Núñez; 50 Steve Ontiveros; 38 Steve Phoenix; 40 Carlos Reyes; 19 Dave Righetti; 51 Roger Smithberg; 22 Billy Taylor; 59 Todd Van Poppel; 57 Ed Vosberg; 35 Bob Welch; 32 Bobby Witt	Catchers: 48 Eric Helfand; 2 Scott Hemond; 36 Terry Steinbach; Infielders: 14 Mike Bordick; 19 Jim Bowie; 7 Scott Brosius; 31 Mike Brumley; 41 Fausto Cruz; 13 Brent Gates; 37 Francisco Matos; 25 Mark McGwire; 16 Troy Neel; 9 Junior Noboa; 3 Craig Paquette; 6 Steve Sax; 42 Jeff Schaefer	Outfielders: 23 Mike Aldrete; 29 Gerónimo Berroa; 31 Eric Fox; 24 Rickey Henderson; 28 Stan Javier; 29 Rubén Sierra; 9 Ernie Young	Manager: 10 Tony La Russa; Coaches: 18 Dave Duncan (Pitching); 5 Art Kusnyer (Bullpen); 4 Carney Lansford (Bench); 6 Jim Lefebvre (Hitting); 8 Dave McKay (First Base); 47 Tommie Reynolds (Third Base)

== Player stats ==
=== Batting ===
==== Starters by position ====
Note: Pos = Position; G = Games played; AB = At bats; H = Hits; Avg. = Batting average; HR = Home runs; RBI = Runs batted in

Pos	Player	G	AB	H	Avg.	HR	RBI
C	Terry Steinbach	103	369	105	.285	11	57
1B	Troy Neel	83	278	74	.266	15	48
2B	Brent Gates	64	233	66	.283	2	24
SS	Mike Bordick	114	391	99	.253	2	37
3B	Scott Brosius	96	324	77	.238	14	49
LF	Rickey Henderson	87	296	77	.260	6	20
CF	Stan Javier	109	419	114	.272	10	44
RF	Rubén Sierra	110	426	114	.268	23	92
DH	Gerónimo Berroa	96	340	104	.306	13	65

==== Other batters ====
Note: G = Games played; AB = At bats; H = Hits; Avg. = Batting average; HR = Home runs; RBI = Runs batted in

Player	G	AB	H	Avg.	HR	RBI
Scott Hemond	91	198	44	.222	3	20
Mike Aldrete	76	178	43	.242	4	18
Mark McGwire	47	135	34	.252	9	25
Craig Paquette	14	49	7	.143	0	0
Eric Fox	26	44	9	.205	1	1
Junior Noboa	17	40	13	.325	0	6
Ernie Young	11	30	2	.067	0	3
Fausto Cruz	17	28	3	.107	0	0
Francisco Matos	14	28	7	.250	0	2
Mike Brumley	11	25	6	.240	0	2
Steve Sax	7	24	6	.250	0	1
Jim Bowie	6	14	3	.214	0	0
Jeff Schaefer	6	8	1	.125	0	0
Eric Helfand	7	6	1	.167	0	1

=== Pitching ===
==== Starting pitchers ====
Note: G = Games pitched; IP = Innings pitched; W = Wins; L = Losses; ERA = Earned run average; SO = Strikeouts

Player	G	IP	W	L	ERA	SO
Ron Darling	25	160.0	10	11	4.50	108
Bobby Witt	24	135.2	8	10	5.04	111
Todd Van Poppel	23	116.2	7	10	6.09	83
Miguel Jimenez	8	34.0	1	4	7.41	22
Steve Karsay	4	28.0	1	1	2.57	15
Mike Mohler	1	2.1	0	1	7.71	4

==== Other pitchers ====
Note: G = Games pitched; IP = Innings pitched; W = Wins; L = Losses; ERA = Earned run average; SO = Strikeouts

Player	G	IP	W	L	ERA	SO
Steve Ontiveros	27	115.1	6	4	2.65	56
Carlos Reyes	27	78.0	0	3	4.15	57
Bob Welch	25	68.2	3	6	7.08	44

==== Relief pitchers ====
Note: G = Games pitched; W = Wins; L = Losses; SV = Saves; ERA = Earned run average; SO = Strikeouts

Player	G	W	L	SV	ERA	SO
Dennis Eckersley	45	5	4	19	4.26	47
Billy Taylor	41	1	3	1	3.50	48
John Briscoe	37	4	2	1	4.01	45
Mark Acre	34	5	1	0	3.41	21
Vince Horsman	33	0	1	0	4.91	20
Dave Leiper	26	0	0	1	1.93	14
Ed Vosberg	16	0	2	0	3.95	12
Edwin Núñez	15	0	0	0	12.00	15
Dave Righetti	7	0	0	0	16.71	4
Steve Phoenix	2	0	0	0	6.23	3
Roger Smithberg	2	0	0	0	15.43	3

== Farm system ==
Level	Team	League	Manager
AAA	Tacoma Tigers	Pacific Coast League	Casey Parsons
AA	Huntsville Stars	Southern League	Gary Jones
A	Modesto A's	California League	Dick Scott
A	West Michigan Whitecaps	Midwest League	Jim Colborn
A-Short Season	Southern Oregon A's	Northwest League	Tom Dunton
Rookie	AZL Athletics	Arizona League	Tony DeFrancesco

LEAGUE CHAMPIONS: Huntsville
