= 1994 Texas Rangers season =

1994 Texas Rangers
- League: American League
- Division: Western Division
- Ballpark: The Ballpark in Arlington
- City: Arlington, Texas
- Record: 52–62 (.456)
- Divisional place: 1st
- Owners: George W. Bush
- General managers: Tom Grieve
- Managers: Kevin Kennedy
- Television: KTVT (Jim Sundberg, Steve Busby); HSE (Greg Lucas, Norm Hitzges)
- Radio: WBAP (Eric Nadel, Mark Holtz); KXEB (Luis Mayoral, Mario Díaz Oroszo)

The 1994 Texas Rangers season was cut short by the infamous 1994 player's strike. At the time when the strike began, the Rangers were leading the American League West with a record of 52 wins and 62 losses. It was their first season at The Ballpark in Arlington.

== Offseason ==
- November 22, 1993: Will Clark was signed as a free agent by the Rangers.
- December 18, 1993: Billy Ripken was signed as a free agent by the Rangers.

== Regular season ==
Despite compiling a record of just 52-62 by Friday, August 12, the Rangers were actually leading the AL West Division. They had scored 613 runs (5.38 per game) and allowed 697 runs (6.11 per game).

The Rangers' pitching struggled over the course of the strike-shortened season, finishing 1st in most runs allowed (697) and most home runs allowed (157). However on July 28, Kenny Rogers pitched the 14th perfect game in Major League Baseball history, blanking the California Angels 4–0 at The Ballpark at Arlington. Needing 98 pitches to complete his masterpiece, Rogers struck out eight batters. He also survived three-ball counts to seven Angel hitters.

=== Season standings ===
AL West
Team	W	L	Pct.	GB	Home	Road
Texas Rangers	52	62	.456	—	31‍–‍32	21‍–‍30
Oakland Athletics	51	63	.447	1	24‍–‍32	27‍–‍31
Seattle Mariners	49	63	.438	2	22‍–‍22	27‍–‍41
California Angels	47	68	.409	5½	23‍–‍40	24‍–‍28

Division leaders
Team	W	L	Pct.
New York Yankees	70	43	.619
Chicago White Sox	67	46	.593
Texas Rangers	52	62	.456

Wild Card team (Top team qualifies for postseason)
Team	W	L	Pct.	GB
Cleveland Indians	66	47	.584	—
Baltimore Orioles	63	49	.562	2½
Kansas City Royals	64	51	.557	3
Toronto Blue Jays	55	60	.478	12
Boston Red Sox	54	61	.470	13
Minnesota Twins	53	60	.469	13
Detroit Tigers	53	62	.461	14
Milwaukee Brewers	53	62	.461	14
Oakland Athletics	51	63	.447	15½
Seattle Mariners	49	63	.438	16½
California Angels	47	68	.409	20

=== Record vs. opponents ===
1994 American League record Source: MLB Standings Grid – 1994
Team	BAL	BOS	CAL	CWS	CLE	DET	KC	MIL	MIN	NYY	OAK	SEA	TEX	TOR
Baltimore	—	4–2	8–4	2–4	4–6	3–4	4–1	7–3	4–5	4–6	7–5	4–6	3–3	7–2
Boston	2–4	—	7–5	2–4	3–7	4–2	4–2	5–5	1–8	3–7	9–3	6–6	1–5	7–3
California	4–8	5–7	—	5–5	0–5	3–4	6–4	3–3	3–3	4–8	3–6	2–7	6–4	3–4
Chicago	4–2	4–2	5–5	—	7–5	8–4	3–7	9–3	2–4	4–2	6–3	9–1	4–5	2–3
Cleveland	6–4	7–3	5–0	5–7	—	8–2	1–4	5–2	9–3	0–9	6–0	3–2	5–7	6–4
Detroit	4–3	2–4	4–3	4–8	2–8	—	4–8	6–4	3–3	3–3	5–4	6–3	5–7	5–4
Kansas City	1–4	2–4	4–6	7–3	4–1	8–4	—	5–7	6–4	4–2	7–3	6–4	4–3	6–6
Milwaukee	3–7	5–5	3–3	3–9	2–5	4–6	7–5	—	6–6	2–7	4–1	4–2	3–3	7–3
Minnesota	5–4	8–1	3–3	4–2	3–9	3–3	4–6	6–6	—	4–5	2–5	3–3	4–5	4–8
New York	6–4	7–3	8–4	2–4	9–0	3–3	2–4	7–2	5–4	—	7–5	8–4	3–2	3–4
Oakland	5–7	3–9	6–3	3–6	0–6	4–5	3–7	1–4	5–2	5–7	—	4–3	7–3	5–1
Seattle	4–6	6–6	7–2	1–9	2–3	3–6	4–6	2–4	3–3	4–8	3–4	—	9–1	1–5
Texas	3–3	5–1	4–6	5–4	7–5	7–5	3–4	3–3	5–4	2–3	3–7	1–9	—	4–8
Toronto	2–7	3–7	4–3	3–2	4–6	4–5	6–6	3–7	8–4	4–3	1–5	5–1	8–4	—

=== Notable transactions ===
- June 2, 1994: Scott Podsednik was drafted by the Rangers in the 3rd round of the 1994 Major League Baseball draft. Player signed June 5, 1994.
- June 29, 1994: Tim Leary was signed as a free agent by the Rangers.

=== Roster ===
1994 Texas Rangers
Roster
Pitchers: 77 Jack Armstrong; 45 Brian Bohanon; 41 Kevin Brown; 39 Duff Brumley; 38 Terry Burrows; 31 Cris Carpenter; 21 John Dettmer; 24 Steve Dreyer; 30 Héctor Fajardo; 32 Rick Helling; 50 Tom Henke; 40 Rick Honeycutt; 52 Jay Howell; 47 Bruce Hurst; 25 James Hurst; 36 Tim Leary; 28 Darren Oliver; 59 Roger Pavlik; 39 Rick Reed; 37 Kenny Rogers; 35 Dan Smith; 27 Matt Whiteside	Catchers: 0 Junior Ortiz; 7 Iván Rodríguez; Infielders: 6 Esteban Beltré; 22 Will Clark; 1 Jeff Frye; 11 Chuck Jackson; 2 Manuel Lee; 16 Dean Palmer; 3 Billy Ripken; 20 Doug Strange	Outfielders: 33 Jose Canseco; 13 Butch Davis; 12 Rob Ducey; 19 Juan González; 29 Rusty Greer; 15 David Hulse; 4 Chris James; 8 Oddibe McDowell; 5 Gary Redus	Manager: 44 Kevin Kennedy; Coaches: 43 Mickey Hatcher; 47 Perry Hill; 42 Jackie Moore; 26 Dave Oliver; 48 Claude Osteen; 46 Willie Upshaw

== Player stats ==
= Indicates team leader

=== Batting ===
==== Starters by position ====
Note: Pos = Position; G = Games played; AB = At bats; H = Hits; Avg. = Batting average; HR = Home runs; RBI = Runs batted in

Pos	Player	G	AB	H	Avg.	HR	RBI
C	Iván Rodríguez	99	363	108	.298	16	57
1B	Will Clark	110	389	128	.329	13	80
2B	Jeff Frye	57	205	67	.327	0	18
SS	Manuel Lee	95	335	93	.278	2	38
3B	Dean Palmer	93	342	84	.246	19	59
LF	Juan González	107	422	116	.275	19	85
CF	David Hulse	77	310	79	.255	1	19
RF	Rusty Greer	80	277	87	.314	10	46
DH	Jose Canseco	111	429	121	.282	31	90

==== Other batters ====
Note: G = Games played; AB = At bats; H = Hits; Avg. = Batting average; HR = Home runs; RBI = Runs batted in

Player	G	AB	H	Avg.	HR	RBI
Doug Strange	73	226	48	.212	5	26
Oddibe McDowell	59	183	48	.262	1	15
Chris James	52	133	34	.256	7	19
Esteban Beltré	48	131	37	.282	0	12
Billy Ripken	32	81	25	.309	0	6
Junior Ortiz	29	76	21	.276	0	9
Gary Redus	18	33	9	.273	0	2
Rob Ducey	11	29	5	.172	0	1
Butch Davis	4	17	4	.235	0	0
Chuck Jackson	1	2	0	.000	0	0

=== Pitching ===
==== Starting pitchers ====
Note: G = Games pitched; IP = Innings pitched; W = Wins; L = Losses; ERA = Earned run average; SO = Strikeouts

Player	G	IP	W	L	ERA	SO
Kevin Brown	26	170.0	7	9	4.82	123
Kenny Rogers	24	167.1	11	8	4.46	120
John Dettmer	11	54.0	0	6	4.33	27
Rick Helling	9	52.0	3	2	5.88	25
Roger Pavlik	11	50.1	2	5	7.69	31
Bruce Hurst	8	38.0	2	1	7.11	24
Jack Armstrong	2	10.0	0	1	3.60	7

==== Other pitchers ====
Note: G = Games pitched; IP = Innings pitched; W = Wins; L = Losses; ERA = Earned run average; SO = Strikeouts

Player	G	IP	W	L	ERA	SO
Héctor Fajardo	18	83.1	5	7	6.91	45
Brian Bohanon	11	37.1	2	2	7.23	26
Tim Leary	6	21.0	1	1	8.14	9
Steve Dreyer	5	17.1	1	1	5.71	11
Rick Reed	4	16.2	1	1	5.94	12

==== Relief pitchers ====
Note: G = Games pitched; W = Wins; L = Losses; SV = Saves; ERA = Earned run average; SO = Strikeouts

Player	G	W	L	SV	ERA	SO
Tom Henke	37	3	6	15	3.79	39
Matt Whiteside	47	2	2	1	5.02	37
Cris Carpenter	47	2	5	5	5.03	39
Darren Oliver	43	4	0	2	3.42	50
Rick Honeycutt	42	1	2	1	7.20	18
Jay Howell	40	4	1	2	5.44	22
Dan Smith	13	1	2	0	4.30	9
James Hurst	8	0	0	0	10.13	5
Duff Brumley	2	0	0	0	16.20	4
Terry Burrows	1	0	0	0	9.00	0

== Awards and honors ==
- Iván Rodríguez, C, Gold Glove
- Iván Rodríguez, Silver Slugger Award,

All-Star Game

- Iván Rodríguez, C, Starter
- Will Clark, 1B, Reserve

== Farm system ==
Level	Team	League	Manager
AAA	Oklahoma City 89ers	American Association	Bobby Jones
AA	Tulsa Drillers	Texas League	Stan Cliburn
A	Charlotte Rangers	Florida State League	Tommy Thompson
A	Charleston RiverDogs	South Atlantic League	Walt Williams
A-Short Season	Hudson Valley Renegades	New York–Penn League	Doug Sisson
Rookie	GCL Rangers	Gulf Coast League	Chino Cadahia
