= 1994 California Angels season =

Major League Baseball season

1994 California Angels
- League: American League
- Division: West
- Ballpark: Anaheim Stadium
- City: Anaheim, California
- Record: 47–68 (.409)
- Divisional place: 4th
- Owner: Gene Autry
- General manager: Bill Bavasi
- Managers: Buck Rodgers and Marcel Lachemann
- Television: KTLA; Prime Ticket (Ken Wilson, Ken Brett)
- Radio: KMPC (Bob Starr, Billy Sample); XPRS (Ruben Valentin, Ulpiano Cos Villa)
- Stats: ESPN.com; Baseball Reference

The 1994 California Angels season was the 34th season of the California Angels franchise in the American League, the 29th in Anaheim, and their 29th season playing their home games at Anaheim Stadium. The Angels finished fourth in the American League West with a record of 47 wins and 68 losses. The season was cut short by the 1994 player's strike.

== Offseason ==
- December 9, 1993: Spike Owen was traded by the New York Yankees with cash to the California Angels for Jose Musset (minors).
- January 28, 1994: Shawn Hillegas was signed as a free agent with the California Angels.
- January 31, 1994: Bo Jackson was signed as a free agent with the California Angels.
- March 28, 1994: Rex Hudler was signed as a free agent with the California Angels.

== Regular season ==
By Friday, August 12, the Angels had compiled a 47–68 record through 115 games. They had scored 543 runs (4.72 per game) and allowed 660 runs (5.74 per game).

=== Season standings ===
AL West
Team	W	L	Pct.	GB	Home	Road
Texas Rangers	52	62	.456	—	31‍–‍32	21‍–‍30
Oakland Athletics	51	63	.447	1	24‍–‍32	27‍–‍31
Seattle Mariners	49	63	.438	2	22‍–‍22	27‍–‍41
California Angels	47	68	.409	5½	23‍–‍40	24‍–‍28

Division leaders
Team	W	L	Pct.
New York Yankees	70	43	.619
Chicago White Sox	67	46	.593
Texas Rangers	52	62	.456

Wild Card team (Top team qualifies for postseason)
Team	W	L	Pct.	GB
Cleveland Indians	66	47	.584	—
Baltimore Orioles	63	49	.562	2½
Kansas City Royals	64	51	.557	3
Toronto Blue Jays	55	60	.478	12
Boston Red Sox	54	61	.470	13
Minnesota Twins	53	60	.469	13
Detroit Tigers	53	62	.461	14
Milwaukee Brewers	53	62	.461	14
Oakland Athletics	51	63	.447	15½
Seattle Mariners	49	63	.438	16½
California Angels	47	68	.409	20

=== Record vs. opponents ===
1994 American League record Source: MLB Standings Grid – 1994
Team	BAL	BOS	CAL	CWS	CLE	DET	KC	MIL	MIN	NYY	OAK	SEA	TEX	TOR
Baltimore	—	4–2	8–4	2–4	4–6	3–4	4–1	7–3	4–5	4–6	7–5	4–6	3–3	7–2
Boston	2–4	—	7–5	2–4	3–7	4–2	4–2	5–5	1–8	3–7	9–3	6–6	1–5	7–3
California	4–8	5–7	—	5–5	0–5	3–4	6–4	3–3	3–3	4–8	3–6	2–7	6–4	3–4
Chicago	4–2	4–2	5–5	—	7–5	8–4	3–7	9–3	2–4	4–2	6–3	9–1	4–5	2–3
Cleveland	6–4	7–3	5–0	5–7	—	8–2	1–4	5–2	9–3	0–9	6–0	3–2	5–7	6–4
Detroit	4–3	2–4	4–3	4–8	2–8	—	4–8	6–4	3–3	3–3	5–4	6–3	5–7	5–4
Kansas City	1–4	2–4	4–6	7–3	4–1	8–4	—	5–7	6–4	4–2	7–3	6–4	4–3	6–6
Milwaukee	3–7	5–5	3–3	3–9	2–5	4–6	7–5	—	6–6	2–7	4–1	4–2	3–3	7–3
Minnesota	5–4	8–1	3–3	4–2	3–9	3–3	4–6	6–6	—	4–5	2–5	3–3	4–5	4–8
New York	6–4	7–3	8–4	2–4	9–0	3–3	2–4	7–2	5–4	—	7–5	8–4	3–2	3–4
Oakland	5–7	3–9	6–3	3–6	0–6	4–5	3–7	1–4	5–2	5–7	—	4–3	7–3	5–1
Seattle	4–6	6–6	7–2	1–9	2–3	3–6	4–6	2–4	3–3	4–8	3–4	—	9–1	1–5
Texas	3–3	5–1	4–6	5–4	7–5	7–5	3–4	3–3	5–4	2–3	3–7	1–9	—	4–8
Toronto	2–7	3–7	4–3	3–2	4–6	4–5	6–6	3–7	8–4	4–3	1–5	5–1	8–4	—

=== Transactions ===
- April 1, 1994: Torey Lovullo was selected off waivers by the Seattle Mariners from the California Angels.

=== Roster ===
1994 California Angels
Roster
Pitchers: 56 Brian Anderson; 23 Mike Butcher; 41 John Dopson; 38 John Farrell; 31 Chuck Finley; 19 Joe Grahe; 12 Mark Langston; 21 Craig Lefferts; 45 Phil Leftwich; 27 Mark Leiter; 18 Scott Lewis; 35 Andrew Lorraine; 32 Joe Magrane; 28 Bob Patterson; 47 Ken Patterson; 36 Bill Sampen; 36 Jeff Schwarz; 43 Russ Springer	Catchers: 7 Mark Dalesandro; 14 Jorge Fábregas; 11 Greg Myers; 20 Chris Turner; Infielders: 5 Rod Correia; 33 Gary DiSarcina; 1 Damion Easley; 10 Rex Hudler; 17 Spike Owen; 24 Eduardo Pérez; 3 Harold Reynolds; 6 J. T. Snow	Outfielders: 16 Garret Anderson; 9 Chad Curtis; 44 Chili Davis; 25 Jim Edmonds; 22 Bo Jackson; 15 Tim Salmon; 35 Dwight Smith	Manager: 2 Bobby Knoop; 53 Marcel Lachemann; 7 Buck Rodgers; Coaches: 29 Rod Carew (Hitting); 55 Chuck Hernandez (Pitching); 2 Bobby Knoop (First Base); 39 Ken Macha (Third Base); 37 Mako Oliveras (Bullpen); 50 Jimmie Reese (Assistant)

== Player stats ==
=== Batting ===
Note: Pos = Position; G = Games played; AB = At bats; H = Hits; Avg. = Batting average; HR = Home runs; RBI = Runs batted in

Pos	Player	G	AB	H	Avg.	HR	RBI
C	Chris Turner	58	149	36	.242	1	12
1B	J.T. Snow	61	223	49	.220	8	30
2B	Harold Reynolds	74	207	48	.232	0	11
SS	Gary Disarcina	112	389	101	.260	3	33
3B	Spike Owen	82	268	83	.310	3	37
LF	Jim Edmonds	94	289	79	.273	5	37
CF	Chad Curtis	114	453	116	.256	11	50
RF	Tim Salmon	100	373	107	.287	23	70
DH	Chili Davis	108	392	122	.311	26	84

==== Other batters ====
Note: G = Games played; AB = At bats; H = Hits; Avg. = Batting average; HR = Home runs; RBI = Runs batted in

Player	G	AB	H	Avg.	HR	RBI
Damion Easley	88	316	68	.215	6	30
Bo Jackson	75	201	56	.279	13	43
Eduardo Pérez	38	129	27	.209	5	16
Jorge Fábregas	43	127	36	.283	0	16
Greg Myers	45	126	31	.246	2	8
Rex Hudler	56	124	37	.298	8	20
Dwight Smith	45	122	32	.262	5	18
Mark Dalesandro	19	25	5	.200	1	2
Rod Correia	6	17	4	.235	0	0
Garret Anderson	5	13	5	.385	0	1

=== Starting pitchers ===
Note: G = Games pitched; IP = Innings pitched; W = Wins; L = Losses; ERA = Earned run average; SO = Strikeouts

Player	G	IP	W	L	ERA	SO
Chuck Finley	25	183.1	10	10	4.32	148
Mark Langston	18	119.1	7	8	4.68	109
Phil Leftwich	20	114.0	5	10	5.68	67
Brian Anderson	18	101.2	7	5	5.22	47
John Farrell	3	13.0	1	2	9.00	10

==== Other pitchers ====
Note: G = Games pitched; IP = Innings pitched; W = Wins; L = Losses; ERA = Earned run average; SO = Strikeouts

Player	G	IP	W	L	ERA	SO
Mark Leiter	40	95.1	4	7	4.72	71
Joe Magrane	20	74.0	2	6	7.30	33
John Dopson	21	58.2	1	4	6.14	33
Russ Springer	18	45.2	2	2	5.52	28
Andrew Lorraine	4	18.2	0	2	10.61	10

===== Relief pitchers =====
Note: G = Games pitched; W = Wins; L = Losses; SV = Saves; ERA = Earned run average; SO = Strikeouts

Player	G	W	L	SV	ERA	SO
Joe Grahe	40	2	5	13	6.65	26
Bob Patterson	47	2	3	1	4.07	30
Mike Butcher	33	2	1	1	6.67	19
Craig Lefferts	30	1	1	1	4.67	27
Scott Lewis	20	0	1	0	6.10	10
Bill Sampen	10	1	1	0	6.46	9
Jeff Schwarz	4	0	0	0	4.05	4
Ken Patterson	1	0	0	0	0.00	1

== Farm system ==
Level	Team	League	Manager
AAA	Vancouver Canadians	Pacific Coast League	Don Long
AA	Midland Angels	Texas League	Mario Mendoza
A	Lake Elsinore Storm	California League	Mitch Seoane
A	Cedar Rapids Kernels	Midwest League	Tom Lawless
A-Short Season	Boise Hawks	Northwest League	Tom Kotchman
Rookie	AZL Angels	Arizona League	Bill Lachemann

LEAGUE CHAMPIONS: Cedar Rapids, Boise

Records
Preceded by 1993	California Angels seasons 1994	Succeeded by 1995
