= 1994 Chicago White Sox season =

1994 Chicago White Sox
- League: American League
- Division: Central
- Ballpark: Comiskey Park
- City: Chicago
- Record: 67–46 (.593)
- Divisional place: 1st
- Owners: Jerry Reinsdorf
- General managers: Ron Schueler
- Managers: Gene Lamont
- Television: WGN-TV; SportsChannel Chicago (Ken Harrelson, Tom Paciorek)
- Radio: WMAQ (AM) (John Rooney, Ed Farmer); WIND (AM) (Hector Molina, Chico Carrasquel)

The 1994 Chicago White Sox season was the White Sox's 94th season in the major leagues, and their 95th season overall. They led the American League Central, 1 game ahead of the second place Cleveland Indians with a record of 67–46, when the season was cut short by the 1994–95 Major League Baseball strike.

== Michael Jordan ==
After retiring from the National Basketball Association, Michael Jordan surprised the sports world by signing a contract with the Chicago White Sox. He was invited to spring training and was sent to the Birmingham Barons on March 31, 1994. Jordan has stated this decision was made to pursue the dream of his late father, who had always envisioned his son as a Major League Baseball player.

== Offseason ==
- October 13, 1993: George Bell was released by the Chicago White Sox.
- December 15, 1993: Julio Franco was signed as a free agent with the Chicago White Sox.
- December 22, 1993: Tim Raines signed as a free agent with the Chicago White Sox.
- December 28, 1993: Ron Coomer was traded by the Chicago White Sox to the Los Angeles Dodgers for Isidro Marquez.
- February 8, 1994: Carlos Lee was signed by the Chicago White Sox as an amateur free agent.
- January 26, 1994: Dane Johnson was signed as a free agent with the Chicago White Sox.
- March 1, 1994: Scott Sanderson was signed as a free agent with the Chicago White Sox.
- March 21, 1994: Paul Assenmacher was traded by the New York Yankees to the Chicago White Sox for Brian Boehringer.
- March 29, 1994: Mike Huff was traded by the Chicago White Sox to the Toronto Blue Jays for Domingo Martínez.

== Regular season ==
- July 15, 1994: During a game against the White Sox, Indians outfielder Albert Belle's bat was confiscated by umpire Dave Phillips. It was the result of White Sox manager Gene Lamont believing that the bat was corked. During the game, Indians pitcher Jason Grimsley removed a ceiling tile in his manager's office and clambered on top of an 18-inch-wide (460 mm) cinder block. He replaced the corked bat with a conventional bat but the bat had Paul Sorrento's name on it. Belle was suspended for seven games.

By Friday, August 12, the White Sox had compiled a 67–46 record through 113 games. They were leading the AL Central Division and had scored 633 runs (5.60 per game) and allowed 498 runs (4.41 per game). Their hitters had also struck out just 568 times: the fewest in the Majors. While their pitchers combined for just 20 saves, they did have 9 shutouts, tying the Oakland Athletics for the most in the Majors, and hit only 17 batters: the fewest among all 28 teams.

=== Season standings ===
AL Central
Team	W	L	Pct.	GB	Home	Road
Chicago White Sox	67	46	.593	—	34‍–‍19	33‍–‍27
Cleveland Indians	66	47	.584	1	35‍–‍16	31‍–‍31
Kansas City Royals	64	51	.557	4	35‍–‍24	29‍–‍27
Minnesota Twins	53	60	.469	14	32‍–‍27	21‍–‍33
Milwaukee Brewers	53	62	.461	15	24‍–‍32	29‍–‍30

Division leaders
Team	W	L	Pct.
New York Yankees	70	43	.619
Chicago White Sox	67	46	.593
Texas Rangers	52	62	.456

Wild Card team (Top team qualifies for postseason)
Team	W	L	Pct.	GB
Cleveland Indians	66	47	.584	—
Baltimore Orioles	63	49	.562	2½
Kansas City Royals	64	51	.557	3
Toronto Blue Jays	55	60	.478	12
Boston Red Sox	54	61	.470	13
Minnesota Twins	53	60	.469	13
Detroit Tigers	53	62	.461	14
Milwaukee Brewers	53	62	.461	14
Oakland Athletics	51	63	.447	15½
Seattle Mariners	49	63	.438	16½
California Angels	47	68	.409	20

=== Record vs. opponents ===
1994 American League record Source: MLB Standings Grid – 1994
Team	BAL	BOS	CAL	CWS	CLE	DET	KC	MIL	MIN	NYY	OAK	SEA	TEX	TOR
Baltimore	—	4–2	8–4	2–4	4–6	3–4	4–1	7–3	4–5	4–6	7–5	4–6	3–3	7–2
Boston	2–4	—	7–5	2–4	3–7	4–2	4–2	5–5	1–8	3–7	9–3	6–6	1–5	7–3
California	4–8	5–7	—	5–5	0–5	3–4	6–4	3–3	3–3	4–8	3–6	2–7	6–4	3–4
Chicago	4–2	4–2	5–5	—	7–5	8–4	3–7	9–3	2–4	4–2	6–3	9–1	4–5	2–3
Cleveland	6–4	7–3	5–0	5–7	—	8–2	1–4	5–2	9–3	0–9	6–0	3–2	5–7	6–4
Detroit	4–3	2–4	4–3	4–8	2–8	—	4–8	6–4	3–3	3–3	5–4	6–3	5–7	5–4
Kansas City	1–4	2–4	4–6	7–3	4–1	8–4	—	5–7	6–4	4–2	7–3	6–4	4–3	6–6
Milwaukee	3–7	5–5	3–3	3–9	2–5	4–6	7–5	—	6–6	2–7	4–1	4–2	3–3	7–3
Minnesota	5–4	8–1	3–3	4–2	3–9	3–3	4–6	6–6	—	4–5	2–5	3–3	4–5	4–8
New York	6–4	7–3	8–4	2–4	9–0	3–3	2–4	7–2	5–4	—	7–5	8–4	3–2	3–4
Oakland	5–7	3–9	6–3	3–6	0–6	4–5	3–7	1–4	5–2	5–7	—	4–3	7–3	5–1
Seattle	4–6	6–6	7–2	1–9	2–3	3–6	4–6	2–4	3–3	4–8	3–4	—	9–1	1–5
Texas	3–3	5–1	4–6	5–4	7–5	7–5	3–4	3–3	5–4	2–3	3–7	1–9	—	4–8
Toronto	2–7	3–7	4–3	3–2	4–6	4–5	6–6	3–7	8–4	4–3	1–5	5–1	8–4	—

=== Opening Day lineup ===
- Tim Raines, LF
- Joey Cora, 2B
- Frank Thomas, 1B
- Julio Franco, DH
- Robin Ventura, 3B
- Darrin Jackson, RF
- Lance Johnson, CF
- Ron Karkovice, C
- Ozzie Guillén, SS
- Jack McDowell, P

=== Notable transactions ===
- April 4, 1994: Pete Rose Jr. was signed as a free agent with the Chicago White Sox.
- April 12, 1994: Atlee Hammaker was signed as a free agent with the Chicago White Sox.
- April 21, 1994: Steve Sax was released by the Chicago White Sox.

=== Roster ===
1994 Chicago White Sox
Roster
Pitchers: 40 Wilson Álvarez; 50,42 Paul Assenmacher; 46 Jason Bere; 27 Dennis Cook; 48 José DeLeón; 32 Alex Fernandez; 34 Atlee Hammaker; 39 Roberto Hernández; 38 Dane Johnson; 25 Kirk McCaskill; 29 Jack McDowell; 36 Scott Ruffcorn; 21 Scott Sanderson; 49 Jeff Schwarz	Catchers: 20 Ron Karkovice; 10 Mike LaValliere; 49 Bob Melvin; 55 Ron Tingley; Infielders: 28 Joey Cora; 14 Julio Franco; 12 Craig Grebeck; 13 Ozzie Guillén; 7 Norberto Martin; 8 Olmedo Sáenz; 35 Frank Thomas; 23 Robin Ventura	Outfielders: 26 Joe Hall; 34 Dann Howitt; 22 Darrin Jackson; 1 Lance Johnson; 24 Warren Newson; 44 Dan Pasqua; 30 Tim Raines; 43 Bob Zupcic	Manager: 33 Gene Lamont; Coaches: 18 Terry Bevington (first base); 41 Jackie Brown (pitching); 6 Walt Hriniak (hitting); 17 Doug Mansolino (third base); 15 Joe Nossek (bench); 55 Dewey Robinson (bullpen)

== Player stats ==
=== Batting ===
Note: G = Games played; AB = At bats; R = Runs scored; H = Hits; 2B = Doubles; 3B = Triples; HR = Home runs; RBI = Runs batted in; BB = Base on balls; SO = Strikeouts; AVG = Batting average; SB = Stolen bases

Player	G	AB	R	H	2B	3B	HR	RBI	BB	SO	AVG	SB
Joey Cora, 2B	90	312	55	86	13	4	2	30	38	32	.276	8
Julio Franco, 3B, 1B	112	433	72	138	19	2	20	98	62	75	.319	8
Craig Grebeck, 2B, SS, 3B	35	97	17	30	5	0	0	5	12	5	.309	0
Ozzie Guillén, SS	100	365	46	105	9	5	1	39	14	35	.288	5
Joe Hall, OF	17	28	6	11	3	0	1	5	2	4	.393	0
Dann Howitt, OF, 1B	10	14	4	5	3	0	0	0	1	7	.357	0
Darrin Jackson, RF, CF	104	369	43	115	17	3	10	51	27	56	.312	7
Lance Johnson, CF	106	412	56	114	11	14	3	54	26	23	.277	26
Ron Karkovice, C	77	207	33	44	9	1	11	29	36	68	.213	0
Mike LaValliere, C	59	139	6	39	4	0	1	24	20	15	.281	0
Norberto Martin, 2B, SS, 3B	45	131	19	36	7	1	1	16	9	16	.275	4
Bob Melvin, C	11	19	3	3	0	0	0	1	1	4	.158	0
Warren Newson, RF, LF	63	102	16	26	5	0	2	7	14	23	.255	1
Dan Pasqua, OF, 1B	11	23	2	5	2	0	2	4	0	9	.217	0
Tim Raines, LF	101	384	80	102	15	5	10	52	61	43	.266	13
Frank Thomas, 1B	113	399	106	141	34	1	38	101	109	61	.353	2
Ron Tingley, C	5	5	0	0	0	0	0	0	0	2	.000	0
Robin Ventura, 3B	109	401	57	113	15	1	18	78	61	69	.282	3
Bob Zupcic, OF, 3B	32	88	10	18	4	1	1	8	4	16	.205	0
Team totals	113	3942	633	1133	175	39	121	602	497	568	.287	77

=== Pitching ===
Note: W = Wins; L = Losses; ERA = Earned run average; G = Games pitched; GS = Games started; SV = Saves; IP = Innings pitched; H = Hits allowed; R = Runs allowed; ER = Earned runs allowed; HR = Home runs allowed; BB = Walks allowed; K = Strikeouts

Player	W	L	ERA	G	GS	SV	IP	H	R	ER	HR	BB	K
Wilson Álvarez	12	8	3.45	24	24	0	161.2	147	72	62	16	63	108
Paul Assenmacher	1	2	3.55	44	0	1	33.0	26	13	13	2	15	29
Jason Bere	12	2	3.81	24	24	0	141.2	119	65	60	17	80	127
Dennis Cook	3	1	3.55	38	0	0	33.0	29	17	13	4	17	26
José DeLeón	3	2	3.36	42	0	2	67.0	48	28	25	5	36	67
Alex Fernandez	11	7	3.86	24	24	0	170.1	163	83	73	25	54	122
Atlee Hammaker	0	0	0.00	2	0	0	1.1	1	0	0	0	0	1
Roberto Hernández	4	4	4.91	45	0	14	47.2	44	29	26	5	20	50
Dane Johnson	2	1	6.57	15	0	0	12.1	16	9	9	2	12	7
Kirk McCaskill	1	4	3.42	40	0	3	52.2	51	22	20	6	26	37
Jack McDowell	10	9	3.73	25	25	0	181.0	186	82	75	12	44	127
Scott Ruffcorn	0	2	12.79	2	2	0	6.1	15	11	9	1	5	3
Scott Sanderson	8	4	5.09	18	14	0	92.0	110	57	52	20	13	36
Jeff Schwarz	0	0	6.35	9	0	0	11.1	9	10	8	0	16	14
Team totals	67	46	3.96	113	113	20	1011.1	964	498	445	115	401	754

== Awards and records ==
- Lance Johnson, American League record, Led American League in triples for four consecutive seasons (1991–1994)
- Frank Thomas, Most Valuable Player, Silver Slugger Award

== Farm system ==
Level	Team	League	Manager
AAA	Nashville Sounds	American Association	Rick Renick
AA	Birmingham Barons	Southern League	Terry Francona
A	Prince William Cannons	Carolina League	Dave Huppert
A	South Bend Silver Hawks	Midwest League	Mike Gellinger
A	Hickory Crawdads	South Atlantic League	Fred Kendall
Rookie	GCL White Sox	Gulf Coast League	Mike Rojas
