= 1994 Kansas City Royals season =

1994 Kansas City Royals
- League: American League
- Division: Central
- Ballpark: Kauffman Stadium
- City: Kansas City, Missouri
- Record: 64–51 (.557)
- Divisional place: 3rd
- Owners: David Glass
- General managers: Herk Robinson
- Managers: Hal McRae
- Television: KSMO-TV (Paul Splittorff, Dave Armstrong)
- Radio: WIBW (AM) (Denny Matthews, Fred White)

The 1994 Kansas City Royals season was the 26th season for the franchise, and their 22nd at Kauffman Stadium. It involved the Royals finishing third in the American League Central with a record of 64 wins and 51 losses. The season was cut short by the 1994 player's strike. The season marked the Royals' alignment into the new American League Central division. This was the last winning season for the Royals until 2003.

== Offseason ==
- December 16, 1993: Gary Gaetti signed as a free agent with the Kansas City Royals.
- January 5, 1994: Kevin McReynolds was traded by the Kansas City Royals to the New York Mets for Vince Coleman and cash.
- January 27, 1994: Steve Balboni was signed as a free agent with the Kansas City Royals.
- January 27, 1994: Dave Henderson was signed as a free agent with the Kansas City Royals.

== Regular season ==
Thanks to the pitching prowess of Kevin Appier, Tom Gordon and 1994 AL Cy Young Award winner David Cone, and the hitting power of AL Rookie of the Year Bob Hamelin, the Royals had compiled a 64–51 record through 115 games. They had scored 574 runs (4.99 per game) and allowed 532 runs (4.63 per game). The Royals were in the thick of the 1994 AL Wildcard race, trailing the Baltimore Orioles by 1/2 a game and the Cleveland Indians by 3 games.

Royals' pitchers struggled with control during the regular season, as they combined for 60 wild pitches (the most in the Majors) through the Royals' 115 games. Royals hitters were very active on the basepaths, as they led the Majors in stolen bases, with 140, and times caught stealing, with 62.

=== Opening Day starters ===
- Vince Coleman
- Brian McRae
- Wally Joyner
- Mike Macfarlane
- Gary Gaetti
- Bob Hamelin
- Dave Henderson
- Greg Gagne
- Jose Lind

=== Season standings ===
AL Central
Team	W	L	Pct.	GB	Home	Road
Chicago White Sox	67	46	.593	—	34‍–‍19	33‍–‍27
Cleveland Indians	66	47	.584	1	35‍–‍16	31‍–‍31
Kansas City Royals	64	51	.557	4	35‍–‍24	29‍–‍27
Minnesota Twins	53	60	.469	14	32‍–‍27	21‍–‍33
Milwaukee Brewers	53	62	.461	15	24‍–‍32	29‍–‍30

Division leaders
Team	W	L	Pct.
New York Yankees	70	43	.619
Chicago White Sox	67	46	.593
Texas Rangers	52	62	.456

Wild Card team (Top team qualifies for postseason)
Team	W	L	Pct.	GB
Cleveland Indians	66	47	.584	—
Baltimore Orioles	63	49	.562	2½
Kansas City Royals	64	51	.557	3
Toronto Blue Jays	55	60	.478	12
Boston Red Sox	54	61	.470	13
Minnesota Twins	53	60	.469	13
Detroit Tigers	53	62	.461	14
Milwaukee Brewers	53	62	.461	14
Oakland Athletics	51	63	.447	15½
Seattle Mariners	49	63	.438	16½
California Angels	47	68	.409	20

=== Record vs. opponents ===
1994 American League record Source: MLB Standings Grid – 1994
Team	BAL	BOS	CAL	CWS	CLE	DET	KC	MIL	MIN	NYY	OAK	SEA	TEX	TOR
Baltimore	—	4–2	8–4	2–4	4–6	3–4	4–1	7–3	4–5	4–6	7–5	4–6	3–3	7–2
Boston	2–4	—	7–5	2–4	3–7	4–2	4–2	5–5	1–8	3–7	9–3	6–6	1–5	7–3
California	4–8	5–7	—	5–5	0–5	3–4	6–4	3–3	3–3	4–8	3–6	2–7	6–4	3–4
Chicago	4–2	4–2	5–5	—	7–5	8–4	3–7	9–3	2–4	4–2	6–3	9–1	4–5	2–3
Cleveland	6–4	7–3	5–0	5–7	—	8–2	1–4	5–2	9–3	0–9	6–0	3–2	5–7	6–4
Detroit	4–3	2–4	4–3	4–8	2–8	—	4–8	6–4	3–3	3–3	5–4	6–3	5–7	5–4
Kansas City	1–4	2–4	4–6	7–3	4–1	8–4	—	5–7	6–4	4–2	7–3	6–4	4–3	6–6
Milwaukee	3–7	5–5	3–3	3–9	2–5	4–6	7–5	—	6–6	2–7	4–1	4–2	3–3	7–3
Minnesota	5–4	8–1	3–3	4–2	3–9	3–3	4–6	6–6	—	4–5	2–5	3–3	4–5	4–8
New York	6–4	7–3	8–4	2–4	9–0	3–3	2–4	7–2	5–4	—	7–5	8–4	3–2	3–4
Oakland	5–7	3–9	6–3	3–6	0–6	4–5	3–7	1–4	5–2	5–7	—	4–3	7–3	5–1
Seattle	4–6	6–6	7–2	1–9	2–3	3–6	4–6	2–4	3–3	4–8	3–4	—	9–1	1–5
Texas	3–3	5–1	4–6	5–4	7–5	7–5	3–4	3–3	5–4	2–3	3–7	1–9	—	4–8
Toronto	2–7	3–7	4–3	3–2	4–6	4–5	6–6	3–7	8–4	4–3	1–5	5–1	8–4	—

=== Transactions ===
- June 2, 1994: Matt Treanor was drafted by the Kansas City Royals in the 4th round of the 1994 amateur draft. Player signed June 4, 1994.
- July 18, 1994: Mike Jeffcoat was signed as a free agent with the Kansas City Royals.
- August 5, 1994: Mike Jeffcoat was released by the Kansas City Royals.

=== Roster ===
1994 Kansas City Royals
Roster
Pitchers: 55 Kevin Appier; 43 Stan Belinda; 41 Billy Brewer; 22 David Cone; 53 José DeJesús; 36 Tom Gordon; 27 Jeff Granger; 23 Mark Gubicza; 33 Chris Haney; 57 Mike Magnante; 28 Rusty Meacham; 38 Bob Milacki; 21 Jeff Montgomery; 35 Hipólito Pichardo	Catchers: 15 Mike Macfarlane; 24 Brent Mayne; Infielders: 30 Hubie Brooks; 8 Gary Gaetti; 7 Greg Gagne; 3 Bob Hamelin; 6 David Howard; 12 Wally Joyner; 13 José Lind; 4 Terry Shumpert	Outfielders: 29 Vince Coleman; 47 Tom Goodwin; 42 Dave Henderson; 34,45 Félix José; 40 Kevin Koslofski; 56 Brian McRae; 16 Keith Miller	Manager: 11 Hal McRae; Coaches: 43 Steve Boros; 44 Glenn Ezell; 42 Bruce Kison; 45 Lee May; 9 Jamie Quirk (bullpen)

== Player stats ==
= Indicates team leader

=== Batting ===
==== Starters by position ====
Note: Pos = Position; G = Games played; AB = At bats; R = Runs; H = Hits; HR = Home runs; RBI = Runs batted in; Avg. = Batting average; SB = Stolen bases

Pos	Player	G	AB	R	H	HR	RBI	Avg.	SB
C	Mike Macfarlane	92	314	53	80	14	47	.255	1
1B	Wally Joyner	97	363	52	113	8	57	.311	3
2B	José Lind	85	290	34	78	1	31	.269	9
3B	Gary Gaetti	90	327	53	94	12	57	.287	0
SS	Greg Gagne	107	375	39	97	7	51	.259	10
LF	Vince Coleman	104	438	61	105	2	33	.240	50
CF	Brian McRae	114	436	71	119	4	40	.273	28
RF	Félix José	99	366	56	111	11	55	.303	10
DH	Bob Hamelin	101	312	64	88	24	65	.282	4

==== Other batters ====
Note: G = Games played; AB = At bats; R = Runs; H = Hits; HR = Home runs; RBI = Runs batted in; Avg. = Batting average; SB = Stolen bases

Player	G	AB	R	H	HR	RBI	Avg.	SB
Dave Henderson	56	198	27	49	5	31	.247	2
Terry Shumpert	64	183	28	44	8	24	.240	18
Brent Mayne	46	144	19	37	2	20	.257	1
David Howard	46	83	9	19	1	13	.229	3
Hubie Brooks	34	61	5	14	1	14	.230	1
Keith Miller	5	15	1	2	0	0	.133	0
Kevin Koslofski	2	4	2	1	0	0	.250	0
Tom Goodwin	2	2	0	0	0	0	.000	0

=== Pitching ===
==== Starting pitchers ====
Note: G = Games pitched; IP = Innings pitched; W = Wins; L = Losses; ERA = Earned run average; SO = Strikeouts

Player	G	IP	W	L	ERA	SO
David Cone	23	171.2	16	5	2.94	132
Tom Gordon	24	155.1	11	7	4.35	126
Kevin Appier	23	155.0	7	6	3.83	145
Mark Gubicza	22	130.0	7	9	4.50	59
Bob Milacki	10	55.2	0	5	6.14	17
Chris Haney	6	28.1	2	2	7.31	18
José DeJesús	5	26.2	3	1	4.73	12
Jeff Granger	2	9.1	0	1	6.75	3

==== Relief pitchers ====
Note: G = Games pitched; IP = Innings pitched; W = Wins; L = Losses; SV = Saves; ERA = Earned run average; SO = Strikeouts

Player	G	IP	W	L	SV	ERA	SO
Jeff Montgomery	42	44.2	2	3	27	4.03	50
Billy Brewer	50	38.2	4	1	3	2.56	25
Hipolito Pichardo	45	67.2	5	3	3	4.92	36
Stan Belinda	37	49.0	2	2	1	5.14	37
Rusty Meacham	36	50.2	3	3	4	3.73	36
Mike Magnante	36	47.0	2	3	0	4.60	21
David Howard	1	2.0	0	0	0	4.50	0

== Awards and honors ==
- Cy Young Award
  - David Cone, Kansas City Royals (AL)
- Rookie of the Year
  - Bob Hamelin, Kansas City Royals (AL)

== Farm system ==
Level	Team	League	Manager
AAA	Omaha Royals	American Association	Jeff Cox
AA	Memphis Chicks	Southern League	Ron Johnson
A	Wilmington Blue Rocks	Carolina League	Mike Jirschele
A	Rockford Royals	Midwest League	John Mizerock
A-Short Season	Eugene Emeralds	Northwest League	Brian Poldberg
Rookie	GCL Royals	Gulf Coast League	Bob Herold

LEAGUE CHAMPIONS: Wilmington
