= Dave Valle =

American baseball player (born 1960)

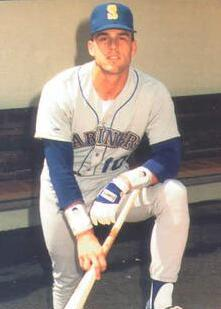
- Valle with the Seattle Mariners c. 1987
- Catcher
- Born: October 30, 1960 (age 65); Bayside, New York, U.S.
- Batted: Right Threw: Right

MLB debut
- September 7, 1984, for the Seattle Mariners

Last MLB appearance
- September 29, 1996, for the Texas Rangers

MLB statistics
- Batting average: .237
- Home runs: 77
- Runs batted in: 350
- Stats at Baseball Reference

Teams
- Seattle Mariners (1984–1993); Boston Red Sox (1994); Milwaukee Brewers (1994); Texas Rangers (1995–1996)

David Valle (/ˈvæli/; born October 30, 1960) is an American former professional baseball player. He played as a catcher in Major League Baseball (MLB) for the Seattle Mariners, Boston Red Sox, Milwaukee Brewers, and Texas Rangers from 1984 to 1996.

Following his playing career, Valle has been a broadcaster for the Mariners, MLB Network, the Rangers, and the New York Yankees. 2026 is his 29th year as a broadcaster. He is currently a color commentator for the Mariners. He also managed the minor league Everett AquaSox in 2014.

== Playing career ==
Valle attended Holy Cross High School in Flushing, New York. The Seattle Mariners selected him in the second round of the 1978 MLB draft. He played in the minor leagues for seven seasons before making his MLB debut at age 23 with the Mariners on September 7, 1984. For the next two seasons, he split his playing time with the Mariners and the Calgary Cannons of the Pacific Coast League, producing a .312 batting average with 21 home runs and 71 runs batted in with Calgary during the 1986 season.

Valle led American League (AL) catchers in 1990 with a .997 fielding percentage, committing two errors in 102 games. He had his best offensive season in 1993, hitting for a .258 batting average with 13 home runs and 63 runs batted in. He led the majors with 17 hit by pitches. He also led AL catchers that year with 881 putouts, 57 baserunners caught stealing, and a 7.05 range factor, finishing with a .995 fielding percentage, and third in assists behind Pat Borders and Iván Rodríguez. Early in the season on April 22, Valle caught Chris Bosio's 97-pitch no-hitter. Valle became a free agent after that season.

Valle signed a one-year contract in December 1993 with the Boston Red Sox, who traded him on June 16, 1994 to the Milwaukee Brewers for outfielder Tom Brunansky.

Valle signed a two-year contract that December with the Texas Rangers, serving as the backup catcher to future Hall of Famer Iván Rodríguez. The Rangers won the AL West in 1996. Rangers broadcaster Eric Nadel has credited Valle for calling a players only meeting during that season that helped turn around their season when they were struggling. That season would be the only one in Valle's career in which his club reached the playoffs. However, he did not appear in the AL Division Series as the Rangers lost to the New York Yankees. Valle retired in 1997 while with the Atlanta Braves organization.

== Player profile ==
In a 13-year career, Valle played in 970 games, accumulating 658 hits in 2,775 at bats for a .237 batting average along with 77 home runs and 350 runs batted in. A solid defensive catcher, he ended his career with a .992 fielding percentage.

On 2023, Valle was inducted into e New York Sate Baseball Hall of Fame.

In August 2026, Valle was named one of the 50 greatest Mariners players. He caught the second-most games for the franchise, trailing Dan Wilson, and is in the top three in most offensive categories for the position, along with Wilson and Cal Raleigh. When Valle hit below .200 in 1991, a Seattle bar set its beer prices to his batting average.

== Broadcasting career ==
Valle was a color analyst for Mariners television and radio broadcasts from 1997 to 2008, returning to the team as a contributor from 2009- 2024. Beginning in 2007, he co-hosted the post-game show on the Mariners radio network. In 2009, he became an analyst on MLB Network's MLB Tonight from 2009-2022. In 2011, he began co-hosting the Mariner pre-game and post-game shows on Root Sports Northwest. After a year off to manage in the minors, he returned to the M's post-game show in 2015. Valle joined the Rangers' announcing crew as an analyst for select Bally Sports Southwest telecasts from 2022-2024. Valle joined the YES Network as a pre- and post-game analyst for Yankees games in 2024-2025. In 2025, the Mariners brought back Valle to serve as a TV and radio analyst.

== Managerial career ==
Valle interviewed for the vacant Mariners managerial opening in November 2013, ultimately filled by Lloyd McClendon.

For the 2014 season, Valle was the manager of the Class A Everett AquaSox, the Mariners' affiliate in the short-season Northwest League.

== Personal life ==
Valle has seven siblings, six of them older. His father, John, played college baseball as a catcher and coached Little League baseball before his death when Valle was eight. One of Valle's older brothers was also a second round MLB draft pick, reaching Triple-A in the minors. In high school, Valle became friends with future baseball executive Omar Minaya.

Valle and his wife have three children. Their son was selected by the Montreal Expos, led by general manager Minaya, in the 44th round of the 2004 MLB draft but chose to play collegiately at Westmont College.

=== Philanthropy ===
Esperanza International is a charitable organization founded in 1995 by Valle and his wife. It is a Christian development organization focused on serving the most impoverished families in the Dominican Republic and Haiti through microfinance initiatives, healthcare, education, and water. As of 2026 Esperanza has served over 1,000,000 people on the island of Hispaniola. through microfinance, Education, health care and clean water Esperanza has provided over 104 million dollars in loans to the poor. They have 365 Christian schools with 85,000 students and 112 water purification projects throughout the island.
