= Gar Finnvold =

American baseball player (born 1968)

- Pitcher
- Born: March 11, 1968 (age 57); Boynton Beach, Florida, U.S.
- Batted: Right Threw: Right

MLB debut
- May 10, 1994, for the Boston Red Sox

Last MLB appearance
- August 7, 1994, for the Boston Red Sox

MLB statistics
- Win–loss record: 0–4
- Earned run average: 5.94
- Strikeouts: 17

Teams
- Boston Red Sox (1994)

Anders Gar Finnvold (born March 11, 1968) is an American former professional baseball player who played in Major League Baseball (MLB) for the 1994 Boston Red Sox.

== Career ==
Finnvold played college baseball first at Palm Beach Community College and then for two years at Florida State University (FSU). In his two years at FSU, Finnvold pitched to a 25–7 win–loss record with a 2.69 earned run average (ERA). He was selected in the sixth round of the 1990 MLB draft by the Boston Red Sox. (He was originally selected in the 42nd round of the 1987 MLB draft by the Seattle Mariners, but did not sign.)

After three years in the Red Sox minor-league system, Finnvold made his major-league debut on May 10, 1994. He made eight starts for the Red Sox before an injury sent him to the disabled list and the players' union strike ended the season in August. He finished the season with an 0–4 record and a 5.94 ERA. He did not appear again in the major leagues and his final minor-league season was 1996 with the Pawtucket Red Sox.

Finnvold's pitching career was somewhat unusual in that every appearance was as a starter; in 113 professional appearances, he never appeared in relief.

Following his baseball career, Finnvold became a real estate advisor in Florida.
