= 1994 Seattle Mariners season =

1994 Seattle Mariners
- League: American League
- Division: West
- Ballpark: Kingdome
- City: Seattle, Washington
- Record: 49–63 (.438)
- Divisional place: 3rd
- Owners: Hiroshi Yamauchi (represented by John Ellis)
- General manager: Woody Woodward
- Manager: Lou Piniella
- Television: KSTW, Prime Sports Northwest
- Radio: KIRO 710 AM (Dave Niehaus, Chip Caray, Ron Fairly, Ken Levine)

The Seattle Mariners 1994 season was their 18th since the franchise creation, and ended the season finishing third in the American League West, finishing with a 49–63 (.438) record. The season was cut short by the player's strike, which began on August 12.

The Mariners played their final 20 games on the road, due to interior ceiling repairs at the Kingdome; they were 10–1 in August, and won their final six games.

== Offseason ==
- November 2, 1993: Bret Boone and Erik Hanson were traded to the Cincinnati Reds for Dan Wilson and Bobby Ayala.
- December 10: Eric Anthony was traded by the Houston Astros for Mike Felder and Mike Hampton.
- December 20: Félix Fermín, Reggie Jefferson, and cash were traded by the Cleveland Indians for Omar Vizquel.
- January 10, 1994: Luis Sojo was signed as a free agent.
- January 31: Bobby Thigpen was signed as a free agent.
- February 15: Jerry Willard was signed as a free agent.

== Regular season ==
A mural of Griffey in downtown Seattle from the strike-shortened 1994 season. The tick-marks represent his home runs up to the time of the strike, when Griffey Jr. was chasing the single-season home run record set by Roger Maris in 1961.

- April 4: The Mariners played in the first game at Cleveland's Jacobs Field. President Bill Clinton threw out the ceremonial first pitch, and the Indians won 4–3 in 11 innings.
- June 17: In the Mariners' 65th game of the season, Ken Griffey Jr. hit his league-leading 30th home run off Kansas City Royals ace David Cone in a 5–1 win at Kauffman Stadium.
- July 8: Shortstop Alex Rodriguez made his major league debut at age 18. It was at Fenway Park against the Boston Red Sox; Rodriguez was flawless in the field, but went hitless in three at bats. He got his first major league hit the following day.

By Friday, August 12, the Mariners had compiled a 49–63 (.438) record through 112 games and were only two games behind the Texas Rangers for the lead in the four-team AL West. They had scored 569 runs (5.08 per game) and allowed 616 runs (5.50 per game).

Slightly more than half of the 162 games scheduled were to be televised this season, with 72 on KSTW and sixteen on Prime Sports Northwest; of those 88 games, 65 were on the road and 23 at home.

=== Opening day starters ===
- Rich Amaral
- Eric Anthony
- Mike Blowers
- Chris Bosio
- Jay Buhner
- Félix Fermín
- Ken Griffey Jr.
- Tino Martinez
- Greg Pirkl
- Dan Wilson

=== Season standings ===
AL West
Team	W	L	Pct.	GB	Home	Road
Texas Rangers	52	62	.456	—	31‍–‍32	21‍–‍30
Oakland Athletics	51	63	.447	1	24‍–‍32	27‍–‍31
Seattle Mariners	49	63	.438	2	22‍–‍22	27‍–‍41
California Angels	47	68	.409	5½	23‍–‍40	24‍–‍28

Division leaders
Team	W	L	Pct.
New York Yankees	70	43	.619
Chicago White Sox	67	46	.593
Texas Rangers	52	62	.456

Wild Card team (Top team qualifies for postseason)
Team	W	L	Pct.	GB
Cleveland Indians	66	47	.584	—
Baltimore Orioles	63	49	.562	2½
Kansas City Royals	64	51	.557	3
Toronto Blue Jays	55	60	.478	12
Boston Red Sox	54	61	.470	13
Minnesota Twins	53	60	.469	13
Detroit Tigers	53	62	.461	14
Milwaukee Brewers	53	62	.461	14
Oakland Athletics	51	63	.447	15½
Seattle Mariners	49	63	.438	16½
California Angels	47	68	.409	20

=== Record vs. opponents ===
1994 American League record Source: MLB Standings Grid – 1994
Team	BAL	BOS	CAL	CWS	CLE	DET	KC	MIL	MIN	NYY	OAK	SEA	TEX	TOR
Baltimore	—	4–2	8–4	2–4	4–6	3–4	4–1	7–3	4–5	4–6	7–5	4–6	3–3	7–2
Boston	2–4	—	7–5	2–4	3–7	4–2	4–2	5–5	1–8	3–7	9–3	6–6	1–5	7–3
California	4–8	5–7	—	5–5	0–5	3–4	6–4	3–3	3–3	4–8	3–6	2–7	6–4	3–4
Chicago	4–2	4–2	5–5	—	7–5	8–4	3–7	9–3	2–4	4–2	6–3	9–1	4–5	2–3
Cleveland	6–4	7–3	5–0	5–7	—	8–2	1–4	5–2	9–3	0–9	6–0	3–2	5–7	6–4
Detroit	4–3	2–4	4–3	4–8	2–8	—	4–8	6–4	3–3	3–3	5–4	6–3	5–7	5–4
Kansas City	1–4	2–4	4–6	7–3	4–1	8–4	—	5–7	6–4	4–2	7–3	6–4	4–3	6–6
Milwaukee	3–7	5–5	3–3	3–9	2–5	4–6	7–5	—	6–6	2–7	4–1	4–2	3–3	7–3
Minnesota	5–4	8–1	3–3	4–2	3–9	3–3	4–6	6–6	—	4–5	2–5	3–3	4–5	4–8
New York	6–4	7–3	8–4	2–4	9–0	3–3	2–4	7–2	5–4	—	7–5	8–4	3–2	3–4
Oakland	5–7	3–9	6–3	3–6	0–6	4–5	3–7	1–4	5–2	5–7	—	4–3	7–3	5–1
Seattle	4–6	6–6	7–2	1–9	2–3	3–6	4–6	2–4	3–3	4–8	3–4	—	9–1	1–5
Texas	3–3	5–1	4–6	5–4	7–5	7–5	3–4	3–3	5–4	2–3	3–7	1–9	—	4–8
Toronto	2–7	3–7	4–3	3–2	4–6	4–5	6–6	3–7	8–4	4–3	1–5	5–1	8–4	—

=== Transactions ===
- April 1: Torey Lovullo was selected off waivers from the California Angels.
- April 3: Goose Gossage was signed as a free agent.
- April 29: Bobby Thigpen was released.
- May 6: Mackey Sasser was released.
- June 2: Jason Varitek was selected in the first round (14th pick) of the 1994 MLB draft. He signed April 20, 1995.

=== Roster ===
1994 Seattle Mariners
Roster
Pitchers: 13 Bobby Ayala; 29 Chris Bosio; 34 Shawn Boskie; 25 Jim Converse; 44 John Cummings; 42 Jeff Darwin; 47 Tim Davis; 35 Dave Fleming; 26 George Glinatsis; 54 Goose Gossage; 37 Greg Hibbard; 41 Milt Hill; 51 Randy Johnson; 50 Kevin King; 43 Jeff Nelson; 12 Erik Plantenberg; 55 Bill Risley; 22 Roger Salkeld; 31 Bobby Thigpen; 46 Bob Wells	Catchers: 33 Bill Haselman; 45 Chris Howard; 15 Mackey Sasser; 31 Jerry Willard; 6 Dan Wilson; Infielders: 8 Rich Amaral; 16 Mike Blowers; 40 Darren Bragg; 10 Félix Fermín; 18 Reggie Jefferson; 27 Torey Lovullo; 11 Edgar Martínez; 20 Greg Pirkl; 3 Alex Rodriguez; 36 Dale Sveum; 9 Luis Sojo	Outfielders: 5 Eric Anthony; 19 Jay Buhner; 24 Ken Griffey Jr.; 34 Quinn Mack; 17 Keith Mitchell; 28 Marc Newfield; 1 Brian Turang	Manager: 14 Lou Piniella; Coaches: 4 Lee Elia; 32 Sammy Ellis; 30 Ken Griffey; 7 John McLaren; 49 Sam Mejías; 2 Sam Perlozzo

== Player stats ==
= Indicates team leader

= Indicates league leader

=== Batting ===
Note: Pos = Position; G = Games played; AB = At bats; H = Hits; Avg. = Batting average; HR = Home runs; RBI = Runs batted in

Pos	Player	G	AB	H	Avg.	HR	RBI.
C	Dan Wilson	91	282	61	.216	3	27
1B	Tino Martinez	97	329	86	.261	20	61
2B	Rich Amaral	77	228	60	.263	4	18
SS	Felix Fermin	101	379	120	.317	1	35
3B	Edgar Martínez	89	326	93	.285	13	51
LF	Eric Anthony	79	262	62	.237	10	30
CF	Ken Griffey Jr.	111	433	140	.323	40	90
RF	Jay Buhner	101	358	100	.279	21	68
DH	Reggie Jefferson	63	162	53	.327	8	32

==== Other batters ====
Note: G = Games played; AB = At bats; H = Hits; Avg. = Batting average; HR = Home runs; RBI = Runs batted in

Player	G	AB	H	Avg.	HR	RBI
Mike Blowers	85	270	78	.289	9	49
Luis Sojo	63	213	59	.277	6	22
Keith Mitchell	46	128	29	.227	5	15
Brian Turang	38	112	21	.188	1	8
Bill Haselman	38	83	16	. 193	1	8
Torey Lovullo	36	72	16	.222	2	7
Alex Rodriguez	17	54	11	.204	0	2
Greg Pirkl	19	53	14	.264	6	11
Marc Newfield	12	38	7	.184	1	4
Dale Sveum	10	27	5	.185	1	2
Chris Howard	9	25	5	.200	0	2
Quinn Mack	5	21	5	.238	0	2
Darren Bragg	8	19	3	.158	0	2
Jerry Willard	6	5	1	.200	1	3
Mackey Sasser	3	4	0	.000	0	0

=== Starting pitchers ===
Note: G = Games pitched; IP = Innings pitched; W = Wins; L = Losses; ERA = Earned run average; SO = Strikeouts

Player	G	IP	W	L	ERA	SO
Randy Johnson	23	172	13	6	3.19	204
Chris Bosio	19	125	4	10	4.32	b67
Dave Fleming	23	117	7	11	6.46	65
Greg Hibbard	15	80 2/3	1	5	6.69	39
Roger Salkeld	13	59	2	5	7.17	46
George Glinatsis	2	5 1/3	0	1	13.50	1

==== Other pitchers ====
Note: G = Games pitched; IP = Innings pitched; W = Wins; L = Losses; ERA = Earned run average; SO = Strikeouts

Player	G	IP	W	L	ERA	SO
John Cummings	17	64	2	4	5.63	33
Jim Converse	13	48 2/3	0	5	8.69	39
Shawn Boskie	2	2 2/3	0	1	6.75	0

===== Relief pitchers =====
Note: G = Games pitched; W = Wins; L = Losses; SV = Saves; ERA = Earned run average; SO = Strikeouts

Player	G	W	L	SV	ERA	SO
Bobby Ayala	46	4	3	18	2.86	76
Tim Davis	42	2	2	2	4.01	28
Bill Risley	37	9	6	0	3.44	61
Rich Gossage	36	3	0	1	4.18	29
Jeff Nelson	28	0	0	0	2.76	44
Kevin King	19	0	2	0	7.04	6
Milt Hill	13	1	0	0	6.46	16
Bobby Thigpen	7	0	2	0	9.39	4
Erik Plantenberg	6	0	0	0	0.00	1
Jeff Darwin	2	0	0	0	13.50	1
Bob Wells	1	1	0	0	2.25	3

== Farm system ==
Level	Team	League	Manager
AAA	Calgary Cannons	Pacific Coast League	Steve Smith
AA	Jacksonville Suns	Southern League	Marc Hill
A	Riverside Pilots	California League	Dave Myers
A	Appleton Foxes	Midwest League	Carlos Lezcano
A-Short Season	Bellingham Mariners	Northwest League	Mike Goff
Rookie	AZL Mariners	Arizona League	Marty Martínez
