= 1994 Milwaukee Brewers season =

1994 Milwaukee Brewers
- League: American League
- Division: Central
- Ballpark: Milwaukee County Stadium
- City: Milwaukee, Wisconsin, United States
- Record: 53–62 (.461)
- Divisional place: 5th
- Owners: Bud Selig
- General managers: Sal Bando
- Managers: Phil Garner
- Television: WVTV (Rory Markas, Del Crandall)
- Radio: WTMJ (AM) (Bob Uecker, Pat Hughes)

The 1994 Milwaukee Brewers season was the 25th season for the Brewers in Milwaukee, and their 26th overall. The Brewers finished fifth in the American League Central with a record of 53 wins and 62 losses.

== Offseason ==
- December 14, 1993: Tony Diggs (minors) was traded by the Brewers to the St. Louis Cardinals for Ozzie Canseco.
- March 29, 1994: Juan Bell was released by the Brewers.

== Regular season ==
By Friday, August 12, the Brewers had compiled a 53-62 record through 115 games. They had scored 547 runs (4.76 per game) and allowed 586 runs (5.10 per game). The 1994 season was permanently suspended on August 12, due to the 1994-95 Major League Baseball strike.

(1994)
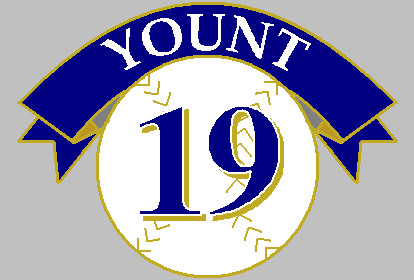
Robin Yount
SS: 1973–93
Coach: 2006

=== Opening Day starters ===
- Alex Diaz
- Cal Eldred
- Darryl Hamilton
- John Jaha
- Dave Nilsson
- Jody Reed
- Kevin Seitzer
- Bill Spiers
- Greg Vaughn
- Turner Ward

=== Season standings ===
AL Central
Team	W	L	Pct.	GB	Home	Road
Chicago White Sox	67	46	.593	—	34‍–‍19	33‍–‍27
Cleveland Indians	66	47	.584	1	35‍–‍16	31‍–‍31
Kansas City Royals	64	51	.557	4	35‍–‍24	29‍–‍27
Minnesota Twins	53	60	.469	14	32‍–‍27	21‍–‍33
Milwaukee Brewers	53	62	.461	15	24‍–‍32	29‍–‍30

Division leaders
Team	W	L	Pct.
New York Yankees	70	43	.619
Chicago White Sox	67	46	.593
Texas Rangers	52	62	.456

Wild Card team (Top team qualifies for postseason)
Team	W	L	Pct.	GB
Cleveland Indians	66	47	.584	—
Baltimore Orioles	63	49	.562	2½
Kansas City Royals	64	51	.557	3
Toronto Blue Jays	55	60	.478	12
Boston Red Sox	54	61	.470	13
Minnesota Twins	53	60	.469	13
Detroit Tigers	53	62	.461	14
Milwaukee Brewers	53	62	.461	14
Oakland Athletics	51	63	.447	15½
Seattle Mariners	49	63	.438	16½
California Angels	47	68	.409	20

=== Record vs. opponents ===
1994 American League record Source: MLB Standings Grid – 1994
Team	BAL	BOS	CAL	CWS	CLE	DET	KC	MIL	MIN	NYY	OAK	SEA	TEX	TOR
Baltimore	—	4–2	8–4	2–4	4–6	3–4	4–1	7–3	4–5	4–6	7–5	4–6	3–3	7–2
Boston	2–4	—	7–5	2–4	3–7	4–2	4–2	5–5	1–8	3–7	9–3	6–6	1–5	7–3
California	4–8	5–7	—	5–5	0–5	3–4	6–4	3–3	3–3	4–8	3–6	2–7	6–4	3–4
Chicago	4–2	4–2	5–5	—	7–5	8–4	3–7	9–3	2–4	4–2	6–3	9–1	4–5	2–3
Cleveland	6–4	7–3	5–0	5–7	—	8–2	1–4	5–2	9–3	0–9	6–0	3–2	5–7	6–4
Detroit	4–3	2–4	4–3	4–8	2–8	—	4–8	6–4	3–3	3–3	5–4	6–3	5–7	5–4
Kansas City	1–4	2–4	4–6	7–3	4–1	8–4	—	5–7	6–4	4–2	7–3	6–4	4–3	6–6
Milwaukee	3–7	5–5	3–3	3–9	2–5	4–6	7–5	—	6–6	2–7	4–1	4–2	3–3	7–3
Minnesota	5–4	8–1	3–3	4–2	3–9	3–3	4–6	6–6	—	4–5	2–5	3–3	4–5	4–8
New York	6–4	7–3	8–4	2–4	9–0	3–3	2–4	7–2	5–4	—	7–5	8–4	3–2	3–4
Oakland	5–7	3–9	6–3	3–6	0–6	4–5	3–7	1–4	5–2	5–7	—	4–3	7–3	5–1
Seattle	4–6	6–6	7–2	1–9	2–3	3–6	4–6	2–4	3–3	4–8	3–4	—	9–1	1–5
Texas	3–3	5–1	4–6	5–4	7–5	7–5	3–4	3–3	5–4	2–3	3–7	1–9	—	4–8
Toronto	2–7	3–7	4–3	3–2	4–6	4–5	6–6	3–7	8–4	4–3	1–5	5–1	8–4	—

=== Roster ===
1994 Milwaukee Brewers
Roster
Pitchers: 25 Ricky Bones; 29 Jeff Bronkey; 21 Cal Eldred; 36 Mike Fetters; 28 Doug Henry; 49 Teddy Higuera; 40 Mike Ignasiak; 43 Mark Kiefer; 37 Graeme Lloyd; 41 José Mercedes; 38 Ángel Miranda; 31 Jaime Navarro; 47 Jesse Orosco; 39 Bob Scanlan; 46 Bill Wegman	Catchers: 12 Brian Harper; 15,22 Mike Matheny; 11 Dave Nilsson; 18 Dave Valle; 42 Rick Wrona; Infielders: 26 Jeff Cirillo; 32 John Jaha; 16 Pat Listach; 8 Jody Reed; 20 Kevin Seitzer; 9 Bill Spiers; 5 B. J. Surhoff; 2 José Valentín	Outfielders: 18 Tom Brunansky; 1 Alex Diaz; 24 Darryl Hamilton; 30 Matt Mieske; 33 Troy O'Leary; 18 Duane Singleton; 23 Greg Vaughn; 27 Turner Ward	Manager: 3 Phil Garner; Coaches: 35 Bill Castro (Bullpen); 12 Gene Clines (Hitting); 10 Duffy Dyer (Third Base); 14 Tim Foli (First Base); 45 Don Rowe (Pitching); 56 Bobby Wine (Bench)

== Player stats ==
=== Batting ===
==== Starters by position ====
Note: Pos = Position; G = Games played; AB = At bats; H = Hits; Avg. = Batting average; HR = Home runs; RBI = Runs batted in

Pos	Player	G	AB	H	Avg.	HR	RBI
C	Dave Nilsson	109	397	109	.275	12	69
1B	John Jaha	84	291	70	.241	12	39
2B	Jody Reed	108	399	108	.271	2	37
SS	José Valentín	97	285	68	.237	11	46
3B	Kevin Seitzer	80	309	97	.314	5	49
LF	Greg Vaughn	95	370	94	.254	19	55
CF	Turner Ward	102	367	85	.232	9	45
RF	Matt Mieske	84	259	67	.259	10	38
DH	Brian Harper	64	251	73	.291	4	32

==== Other batters ====
Note: G = Games played; AB = At bats; H = Hits; Avg. = Batting average; HR = Home runs; RBI = Runs batted in

Player	G	AB	H	Avg.	HR	RBI
Bill Spiers	73	214	54	.252	0	17
Alex Diaz	79	187	47	.251	1	17
Darryl Hamilton	36	141	37	.262	1	13
B.J. Surhoff	40	134	35	.261	5	22
Jeff Cirillo	39	126	30	.238	3	12
Troy O'Leary	27	66	18	.273	2	7
Pat Listach	16	54	16	.296	0	2
Mike Matheny	28	53	12	.226	1	2
Dave Valle	16	36	14	.389	1	5
Tom Brunansky	16	28	6	.214	0	0
Rick Wrona	6	10	5	.500	1	3
Duane Singleton	2	0	0	----	0	0

=== Pitching ===
==== Starting pitchers ====
Note: G = Games pitched; IP = Innings pitched; W = Wins; L = Losses; ERA = Earned run average; SO = Strikeouts

Player	G	IP	W	L	ERA	SO
Cal Eldred	25	179.0	11	11	4.68	98
Ricky Bones	24	170.2	10	9	3.43	57
Bill Wegman	19	115.2	8	4	4.51	59
Ángel Miranda	8	46.0	2	5	5.28	24

==== Other pitchers ====
Note: G = Games pitched; IP = Innings pitched; W = Wins; L = Losses; ERA = Earned run average; SO = Strikeouts

Player	G	IP	W	L	ERA	SO
Bob Scanlan	30	103.0	2	6	4.11	65
Jaime Navarro	29	89.2	4	9	6.62	65
Teddy Higuera	17	58.2	1	5	7.06	35
Mike Ignasiak	23	47.2	3	1	4.53	24

==== Relief pitchers ====
Note: G = Games pitched; W = Wins; L = Losses; SV = Saves; ERA = Earned run average; SO = Strikeouts

Player	G	W	L	SV	ERA	SO
Mike Fetters	42	1	4	17	2.54	31
Graeme Lloyd	43	2	3	3	5.17	31
Jesse Orosco	40	3	1	0	5.08	36
Doug Henry	25	2	3	0	4.60	20
José Mercedes	19	2	0	0	2.32	11
Jeff Bronkey	16	1	1	1	4.35	13
Mark Kiefer	7	1	0	0	8.44	8

== Farm system ==
The Brewers' farm system consisted of seven minor league affiliates in 1994. The Brewers operated a Dominican Summer League team as a co-op with the Houston Astros. The El Paso Diablos won the Texas League championship.

Level	Team	League	Manager
Triple-A	New Orleans Zephyrs	American Association	Chris Bando
Double-A	El Paso Diablos	Texas League	Tim Ireland
Class A-Advanced	Stockton Ports	California League	Lamar Johnson
Class A	Beloit Brewers	Midwest League	Wayne Krenchicki
Rookie	Helena Brewers	Pioneer League	Dub Kilgo
Rookie	AZL Brewers	Arizona League	Ralph Dickenson
Rookie	DSL Astros/Brewers	Dominican Summer League	—
