= 1994 Detroit Tigers season =

Major League Baseball season

1994 Detroit Tigers
- League: American League
- Division: East
- Ballpark: Tiger Stadium
- City: Detroit, Michigan
- Record: 53–62 (.461)
- Divisional place: 5th
- Owners: Mike Ilitch
- General managers: Joe Klein
- Managers: Sparky Anderson
- Television: WDIV-TV (George Kell, Al Kaline); PASS (Ernie Harwell, Jim Price, Jim Northrup)
- Radio: WJR (Rick Rizzs, Bob Rathbun)

The 1994 Detroit Tigers season was the team's 94th season and the 83rd season at Tiger Stadium. They had a record of 53–62 in a strike-shortened season. The season ended with the Tigers in fifth place in the newly formed American League East. The season featured the return of former star Kirk Gibson, the return of Ernie Harwell to the television broadcast booth and the 18th season of the Alan Trammell and Lou Whitaker double play combination.

== Offseason ==
- November 1, 1993: Eric Davis was signed as a free agent by the Tigers.
- November 7, 1993: Joe Boever was signed as a free agent by the Tigers.
- February 4, 1994: Kirk Gibson was signed as a free agent by the Tigers.
- February 7, 1994: Tim Belcher was signed as a free agent by the Tigers.
- February 14, 1994: Juan Samuel was signed as a free agent by the Tigers.
- February 18, 1994: Kevin Morgan was traded by the Tigers to the New York Mets for Joe Dellicarri (minors).
- March 31, 1994: Rico Brogna was traded by the Tigers to the New York Mets for Alan Zinter.

== Regular season ==
By Friday, August 12, the Tigers had compiled a 53–62 record through 115 games. They had scored 652 runs (5.67 per game) and had allowed 671 runs (5.83 per game).

The Tigers were struggling in terms of strikeouts, as their pitchers had combined for the fewest strikeouts (560) and their batters had combined for the most strikeouts (897) in the Majors. Tigers' pitchers also had the most intentional walks in the Majors (74), the fewest shutouts (1) and tied the Chicago White Sox and Los Angeles Dodgers for the fewest saves (20).

=== Season standings ===
AL East
Team	W	L	Pct.	GB	Home	Road
New York Yankees	70	43	.619	—	33‍–‍24	37‍–‍19
Baltimore Orioles	63	49	.562	6½	28‍–‍27	35‍–‍22
Toronto Blue Jays	55	60	.478	16	33‍–‍26	22‍–‍34
Boston Red Sox	54	61	.470	17	31‍–‍33	23‍–‍28
Detroit Tigers	53	62	.461	18	34‍–‍24	19‍–‍38

Division leaders
Team	W	L	Pct.
New York Yankees	70	43	.619
Chicago White Sox	67	46	.593
Texas Rangers	52	62	.456

Wild Card team (Top team qualifies for postseason)
Team	W	L	Pct.	GB
Cleveland Indians	66	47	.584	—
Baltimore Orioles	63	49	.562	2½
Kansas City Royals	64	51	.557	3
Toronto Blue Jays	55	60	.478	12
Boston Red Sox	54	61	.470	13
Minnesota Twins	53	60	.469	13
Detroit Tigers	53	62	.461	14
Milwaukee Brewers	53	62	.461	14
Oakland Athletics	51	63	.447	15½
Seattle Mariners	49	63	.438	16½
California Angels	47	68	.409	20

=== Record vs. opponents ===
1994 American League record Source: MLB Standings Grid – 1994
Team	BAL	BOS	CAL	CWS	CLE	DET	KC	MIL	MIN	NYY	OAK	SEA	TEX	TOR
Baltimore	—	4–2	8–4	2–4	4–6	3–4	4–1	7–3	4–5	4–6	7–5	4–6	3–3	7–2
Boston	2–4	—	7–5	2–4	3–7	4–2	4–2	5–5	1–8	3–7	9–3	6–6	1–5	7–3
California	4–8	5–7	—	5–5	0–5	3–4	6–4	3–3	3–3	4–8	3–6	2–7	6–4	3–4
Chicago	4–2	4–2	5–5	—	7–5	8–4	3–7	9–3	2–4	4–2	6–3	9–1	4–5	2–3
Cleveland	6–4	7–3	5–0	5–7	—	8–2	1–4	5–2	9–3	0–9	6–0	3–2	5–7	6–4
Detroit	4–3	2–4	4–3	4–8	2–8	—	4–8	6–4	3–3	3–3	5–4	6–3	5–7	5–4
Kansas City	1–4	2–4	4–6	7–3	4–1	8–4	—	5–7	6–4	4–2	7–3	6–4	4–3	6–6
Milwaukee	3–7	5–5	3–3	3–9	2–5	4–6	7–5	—	6–6	2–7	4–1	4–2	3–3	7–3
Minnesota	5–4	8–1	3–3	4–2	3–9	3–3	4–6	6–6	—	4–5	2–5	3–3	4–5	4–8
New York	6–4	7–3	8–4	2–4	9–0	3–3	2–4	7–2	5–4	—	7–5	8–4	3–2	3–4
Oakland	5–7	3–9	6–3	3–6	0–6	4–5	3–7	1–4	5–2	5–7	—	4–3	7–3	5–1
Seattle	4–6	6–6	7–2	1–9	2–3	3–6	4–6	2–4	3–3	4–8	3–4	—	9–1	1–5
Texas	3–3	5–1	4–6	5–4	7–5	7–5	3–4	3–3	5–4	2–3	3–7	1–9	—	4–8
Toronto	2–7	3–7	4–3	3–2	4–6	4–5	6–6	3–7	8–4	4–3	1–5	5–1	8–4	—

=== Notable transactions ===
- May 11, 1994: Jorge Velandia and Scott Livingstone were traded by the Tigers to the San Diego Padres for Gene Harris.
- June 17, 1994: Greg Cadaret was signed as a free agent by the Tigers.

=== Roster ===
1994 Detroit Tigers
Roster
Pitchers: 41 Tim Belcher; 43 Sean Bergman; 37 Joe Boever; 15 Greg Cadaret; 48 Storm Davis; 44 John Doherty; 46 Mike Gardiner; 34 Greg Gohr; 42 Buddy Groom; 36 Bill Gullickson; 38 Gene Harris; 39 Mike Henneman; 27 Kurt Knudsen; 30 Bill Krueger; 32 José Lima; 21 Mike Moore; 10 Phil Stidham; 16 David Wells	Catchers: 12 John Flaherty; 19 Chad Kreuter; 20 Mickey Tettleton; Infielders: 9 Skeeter Barnes; 45 Cecil Fielder; 24 Travis Fryman; 35 Chris Gomez; 7 Scott Livingstone; 3 Alan Trammell; 1 Lou Whitaker	Outfielders: 29 Danny Bautista; 22 Milt Cuyler; 33 Eric Davis; 49 Junior Félix; 23 Kirk Gibson; 17 Riccardo Ingram; 4 Tony Phillips; 8 Juan Samuel	Manager: 11 Sparky Anderson; Coaches: 31 Larry Herndon (Hitting); 56 Billy Muffett (Pitching); 52 Gene Roof (First Base); 53 Dick Tracewski (Third Base); 59 Dan Whitmer (Bullpen)

== Player stats ==
= Indicates team leader

=== Batting ===
==== Starters by position ====
Note: Pos = Position; G = Games played; AB = At bats; H = Hits; Avg. = Batting average; HR = Home runs; RBI = Runs batted in

Pos	Player	G	AB	H	Avg.	HR	RBI
C	Chad Kreuter	65	170	38	.224	1	19
1B	Cecil Fielder	109	425	110	.259	28	90
2B	Lou Whitaker	92	322	97	.301	12	43
SS	Alan Trammell	76	292	78	.267	8	28
3B	Travis Fryman	114	464	122	.263	18	85
LF	Tony Phillips	114	438	123	.281	19	61
CF	Eric Davis	37	120	22	.183	3	13
RF	Junior Félix	86	301	92	.306	13	49
DH	Kirk Gibson	98	330	91	.276	23	72

==== Other batters ====
Note: G = Games played; AB = At-bats; H = Hits; Avg. = Batting average; HR = Home runs; RBI = Runs batted in

Player	G	AB	H	Avg.	HR	RBI
Mickey Tettleton	107	339	84	.248	17	51
Chris Gomez	84	296	76	.257	8	53
Juan Samuel	59	136	42	.309	5	21
Milt Cuyler	48	116	28	.241	1	11
Danny Bautista	31	99	23	.232	4	15
John Flaherty	34	40	6	.150	0	4
Riccardo Ingram	12	23	5	.217	0	2
Scott Livingstone	15	23	5	.217	0	1
Skeeter Barnes	24	21	6	.286	1	4

=== Pitching ===
==== Starting pitchers ====
Note: G = Games pitched; IP = Innings pitched; W = Wins; Losses; ERA = Earned run average; SO = Strikeouts

Player	G	IP	W	L	ERA	SO
Tim Belcher	25	162.0	7	15	5.89	76
Mike Moore	25	154.1	11	10	5.42	62
Bill Gullickson	21	115.1	4	5	5.93	65
David Wells	16	111.1	5	7	3.96	71
John Doherty	18	101.1	6	7	6.48	28
Sean Bergman	3	17.2	2	1	5.60	12

==== Other pitchers ====
Note: G = Games pitched; IP = Innings pitched; W = Wins; L = Losses; ERA = Earned run average; SO = Strikeouts

Player	G	IP	W	L	ERA	SO
Greg Gohr	8	34.0	2	2	4.50	21
José Lima	3	6.2	0	1	13.50	7

==== Relief pitchers ====
Note: G = Games pitched; W = Wins; L = Losses; SV = Saves; ERA = Earned run average; SO = Strikeouts

Player	G	W	L	SV	ERA	SO
Mike Henneman	30	1	3	8	5.19	27
Joe Boever	46	9	2	3	3.98	49
Buddy Groom	40	0	1	1	3.94	27
Mike Gardiner	38	2	2	5	4.14	31
Storm Davis	35	2	4	0	3.56	38
Greg Cadaret	17	1	0	2	3.60	14
Bill Krueger	16	0	2	0	9.61	17
Gene Harris	11	0	0	1	7.15	10
Phil Stidham	5	0	0	0	24.92	4
Kurt Knudsen	4	1	0	0	13.50	1

== Awards and honors ==
All-Star Game

- Mickey Tettleton, Catcher, Reserve (Second All-Star appearance)
- Travis Fryman, Third Base, Reserve (Third All-Star appearance)

== Farm system ==
Level	Team	League	Manager
AAA	Toledo Mud Hens	International League	Joe Sparks and Larry Parrish
AA	Trenton Thunder	Eastern League	Tom Runnells
A	Lakeland Tigers	Florida State League	Gerry Groninger and Mark Wagner
A	Fayetteville Generals	South Atlantic League	Dwight Lowry
A-Short Season	Jamestown Jammers	New York–Penn League	Dave Anderson
Rookie	Bristol Tigers	Appalachian League	Kevin Bradshaw

LEAGUE CHAMPIONS: Niagara Falls
