= 1994 Baltimore Orioles season =

Major League Baseball season

1994 Baltimore Orioles
- League: American League
- Division: East
- Ballpark: Oriole Park at Camden Yards
- City: Baltimore, Maryland
- Record: 63–49 (.562)
- Divisional place: 2nd
- Owners: Peter Angelos
- General managers: Roland Hemond
- Managers: Johnny Oates
- Television: WJZ-TV/WNUV/WDCA/Home Team Sports (Mel Proctor, John Lowenstein, Jim Palmer)
- Radio: WBAL (AM) (Chuck Thompson, Jon Miller, Fred Manfra)

The 1994 Baltimore Orioles season was the 94th season in Baltimore Orioles franchise history, the 41st in Baltimore, and the 3rd at Oriole Park at Camden Yards. It involved the Orioles finishing second in the American League East with a record of 63 wins and 49 losses. The season was cut short by the infamous 1994 player's strike.

== Offseason ==
- December 14, 1993: Mark Eichhorn was signed as a free agent with the Baltimore Orioles.
- January 14, 1994: Chris Sabo was signed as a free agent by the Orioles.
- January 20, 1994: Lee Smith was signed as a free agent by the Orioles.
- February 3, 1994: Henry Cotto was signed as a free agent by the Orioles.

== Regular season ==
By Friday August 12, 1994, when the MLB Players' strike began, the Orioles had scored 589 runs (5.26 per game) and allowed 497 runs (4.44 per game) with a 63–49 record through 112 games. They were 2.5 games behind the Cleveland Indians (66–47) in the 1994 AL Wildcard Race.

Because they had only played in 112 games by the time the strike began, the Orioles had the fewest at-bats in the Majors, with just 3,856. The Orioles pitching staff had good control, as the Orioles had the fewest wild pitches (18) in the Majors. They also tied the Seattle Mariners for the fewest balks, with just one. Orioles baserunners successfully stole 69 bases in the strike-shortened season and were caught stealing only 13 times: the fewest in the Majors. Their pitchers also had good control, with just 18 wild pitches thrown: the fewest in the Majors.

- August 2, 1994: Jeff Tackett hit a home run in the last at-bat of his career.

=== Roster ===
1994 Baltimore Orioles
Roster
Pitchers: 49 Armando Benítez; 21 Tom Bolton; 38 Mark Eichhorn; 50 Sid Fernandez; 55 Scott Klingenbeck; 19 Ben McDonald; 75 Alan Mills; 51 Jamie Moyer; 35 Mike Mussina; 56 Mike Oquist; 29 Brad Pennington; 45 Jim Poole; 53 Arthur Rhodes; 47 Lee Smith; 32 Mark Williamson	Catchers: 23 Chris Hoiles; 41 Jeff Tackett; Infielders: 10 Leo Gómez; 36 Tim Hulett; 2 Mark McLemore; 25 Rafael Palmeiro; 8 Cal Ripken Jr.; 17 Chris Sabo	Outfielders: 9 Brady Anderson; 18 Damon Buford; 12 Mike Devereaux; 11 Jeffrey Hammonds; 30 Dwight Smith; 39 Lonnie Smith; 34 Mark Smith; 28 Jack Voigt; Other batters: 3 Harold Baines	Manager: 26 Johnny Oates; Coaches: 24 Greg Biagini (hitting); 17 Dick Bosman (pitching); 13 Don Buford (bench); 44 Elrod Hendricks (bullpen); 15 Davey Lopes (first base); 31 Jerry Narron (third base)

== Season standings ==
AL East
Team	W	L	Pct.	GB	Home	Road
New York Yankees	70	43	.619	—	33‍–‍24	37‍–‍19
Baltimore Orioles	63	49	.562	6½	28‍–‍27	35‍–‍22
Toronto Blue Jays	55	60	.478	16	33‍–‍26	22‍–‍34
Boston Red Sox	54	61	.470	17	31‍–‍33	23‍–‍28
Detroit Tigers	53	62	.461	18	34‍–‍24	19‍–‍38

Division leaders
Team	W	L	Pct.
New York Yankees	70	43	.619
Chicago White Sox	67	46	.593
Texas Rangers	52	62	.456

Wild Card team (Top team qualifies for postseason)
Team	W	L	Pct.	GB
Cleveland Indians	66	47	.584	—
Baltimore Orioles	63	49	.562	2½
Kansas City Royals	64	51	.557	3
Toronto Blue Jays	55	60	.478	12
Boston Red Sox	54	61	.470	13
Minnesota Twins	53	60	.469	13
Detroit Tigers	53	62	.461	14
Milwaukee Brewers	53	62	.461	14
Oakland Athletics	51	63	.447	15½
Seattle Mariners	49	63	.438	16½
California Angels	47	68	.409	20

=== Record vs. opponents ===
1994 American League record Source: MLB Standings Grid – 1994
Team	BAL	BOS	CAL	CWS	CLE	DET	KC	MIL	MIN	NYY	OAK	SEA	TEX	TOR
Baltimore	—	4–2	8–4	2–4	4–6	3–4	4–1	7–3	4–5	4–6	7–5	4–6	3–3	7–2
Boston	2–4	—	7–5	2–4	3–7	4–2	4–2	5–5	1–8	3–7	9–3	6–6	1–5	7–3
California	4–8	5–7	—	5–5	0–5	3–4	6–4	3–3	3–3	4–8	3–6	2–7	6–4	3–4
Chicago	4–2	4–2	5–5	—	7–5	8–4	3–7	9–3	2–4	4–2	6–3	9–1	4–5	2–3
Cleveland	6–4	7–3	5–0	5–7	—	8–2	1–4	5–2	9–3	0–9	6–0	3–2	5–7	6–4
Detroit	4–3	2–4	4–3	4–8	2–8	—	4–8	6–4	3–3	3–3	5–4	6–3	5–7	5–4
Kansas City	1–4	2–4	4–6	7–3	4–1	8–4	—	5–7	6–4	4–2	7–3	6–4	4–3	6–6
Milwaukee	3–7	5–5	3–3	3–9	2–5	4–6	7–5	—	6–6	2–7	4–1	4–2	3–3	7–3
Minnesota	5–4	8–1	3–3	4–2	3–9	3–3	4–6	6–6	—	4–5	2–5	3–3	4–5	4–8
New York	6–4	7–3	8–4	2–4	9–0	3–3	2–4	7–2	5–4	—	7–5	8–4	3–2	3–4
Oakland	5–7	3–9	6–3	3–6	0–6	4–5	3–7	1–4	5–2	5–7	—	4–3	7–3	5–1
Seattle	4–6	6–6	7–2	1–9	2–3	3–6	4–6	2–4	3–3	4–8	3–4	—	9–1	1–5
Texas	3–3	5–1	4–6	5–4	7–5	7–5	3–4	3–3	5–4	2–3	3–7	1–9	—	4–8
Toronto	2–7	3–7	4–3	3–2	4–6	4–5	6–6	3–7	8–4	4–3	1–5	5–1	8–4	—

== Player stats ==
= Indicates team leader

=== Batting ===
==== Starters by position ====
Note: Pos = Position; G = Games played; AB = At bats; H = Hits; Avg. = Batting average; HR = Home runs; RBI = Runs batted in

Pos	Player	G	AB	H	Avg.	HR	RBI
C	Chris Hoiles	99	332	82	.247	19	53
1B	Rafael Palmeiro	111	436	139	.319	23	76
2B	Mark McLemore	104	343	88	.257	3	29
SS	Cal Ripken Jr.	112	444	140	.315	13	75
3B	Leo Gómez	84	285	78	.274	15	56
LF	Brady Anderson	111	453	119	.263	12	48
CF	Mike Devereaux	85	301	61	.203	9	33
RF	Harold Baines	94	326	96	.294	16	54

==== Other batters ====
Note: G = Games played; AB = At bats; H = Hits; Avg. = Batting average; HR = Home runs; RBI = Runs batted in

Player	G	AB	H	Avg.	HR	RBI
Chris Sabo	68	258	66	.256	11	42
Jack Voigt	59	141	34	.241	3	20
Tim Hulett	36	92	21	.228	2	15
Dwight Smith	28	74	23	.311	3	12
Lonnie Smith	35	59	12	.203	0	2
Jeff Tackett	26	53	12	.226	2	9
Mark Smith	3	7	1	.143	0	2
Damon Buford	4	2	1	.500	0	0

=== Pitching ===
= Indicates league leader

==== Starting pitchers ====
Note: G = Games pitched; IP = Innings pitched; W = Wins; L = Losses; ERA = Earned run average; SO = Strikeouts

Player	G	IP	W	L	ERA	SO
Mike Mussina	24	176.1	16	5	3.06	99
Ben McDonald	24	157.1	14	7	4.06	94
Jamie Moyer	23	149.0	5	7	4.77	87
Sid Fernandez	19	115.1	6	6	5.15	95
Arthur Rhodes	10	52.2	3	5	5.81	47
Scott Klingenbeck	1	7.0	1	0	3.86	5

==== Other pitchers ====
Note: G = Games pitched; IP = Innings pitched; W = Wins; L = Losses; ERA = Earned run average; SO = Strikeouts

Player	G	IP	W	L	ERA	SO
Mike Oquist	15	58.1	3	3	6.17	39

==== Relief pitchers ====
Note: G = Games pitched; W = Wins; L = Losses; SV = Saves; ERA = Earned run average; SO = Strikeouts

Player	G	W	L	SV	ERA	SO
Lee Smith	41	1	4	33	3.29	42
Alan Mills	47	3	3	2	5.16	44
Mark Eichhorn	43	6	5	1	2.15	35
Jim Poole	38	1	0	0	6.64	18
Mark Williamson	28	3	1	1	4.01	28
Tom Bolton	22	1	2	0	5.40	12
Brad Pennington	8	0	1	0	12.00	7
Armando Benítez	3	0	0	0	0.90	14

== Farm system ==
Level	Team	League	Manager
AAA	Rochester Red Wings	International League	Bob Miscik
AA	Bowie Baysox	Eastern League	Pete Mackanin
A	Frederick Keys	Carolina League	Mike O'Berry
A	Albany Polecats	South Atlantic League	Butch Wynegar
Rookie	Bluefield Orioles	Appalachian League	Andy Etchebarren
Rookie	GCL Orioles	Gulf Coast League	Oneri Fleita
