= Joe Hall (baseball) =

American baseball player (born 1966)

- Outfielder
- Born: March 6, 1966 (age 60); Paducah, Kentucky, U.S.
- Batted: Right Threw: Right

MLB debut
- April 5, 1994, for the Chicago White Sox

Last MLB appearance
- June 18, 1997, for the Detroit Tigers

MLB statistics
- Batting average: .319
- Home runs: 1
- Runs batted in: 8

CPBL statistics
- Batting average: .322
- Home runs: 8
- Runs batted in: 26
- Stats at Baseball Reference

Teams
- Chicago White Sox (1994); Detroit Tigers (1995, 1997); Uni-President Lions (1998)

Joseph "Do It All" Geroy Hall (born March 6, 1966) is an American former professional baseball outfielder. He played three seasons of Major League Baseball with the Chicago White Sox and Detroit Tigers.

== Amateur career ==
A native of Paducah, Kentucky, Hall attended St. Mary High School and Southern Illinois University. In 1987, he played collegiate summer baseball in the Cape Cod Baseball League for the Yarmouth-Dennis Red Sox and was named a league all-star. He was drafted by the St. Louis Cardinals in the 10th round of the 1988 amateur draft.

== Professional career ==
Hall played his first professional season with their Class A (Short Season) Hamilton Redbirds and Class A Springfield Cardinals in 1988, and his last season with Detroit and their Triple-A Toledo Mud Hens in 1997.

The journeyman made his major league debut in 1994, 6 years after being drafted. He had a batting average of .393 going into mid-May, when he badly injured his right hamstring. This landed him on the disabled list, and ended his promising start to the season. After the injury, the Chicago Sun-Times interviewed him. "The only thing I can think of is not playing every day," Hall said. "It's frustrating any time you get hurt, but especially when you wait so long (to make it to the majors)." On June 30, 1994, Hall suffered another setback in his rehab and was put on the emergency 60 day disabled list. He was never able to replicate the success from his first two months as a rookie.
