= Todd Frohwirth =

American baseball player (1962–2017)

- Relief pitcher
- Born: September 28, 1962; Milwaukee, Wisconsin, U.S.
- Died: March 26, 2017 (aged 54); Waukesha, Wisconsin, U.S.
- Batted: Right Threw: Right

MLB debut
- August 10, 1987, for the Philadelphia Phillies

Last MLB appearance
- May 27, 1996, for the California Angels

MLB statistics
- Win–loss record: 20–19
- Earned run average: 3.60
- Strikeouts: 259
- Stats at Baseball Reference

Teams
- Philadelphia Phillies (1987–1990); Baltimore Orioles (1991–1993); Boston Red Sox (1994); California Angels (1996)

Todd Gerard Frohwirth (September 28, 1962 – March 26, 2017) was an American professional baseball right-handed relief pitcher. He played for all or part of nine seasons in Major League Baseball (MLB) for the Philadelphia Phillies, Baltimore Orioles, Boston Red Sox, and California Angels. Frohwirth threw with a submarine delivery.

Frohwirth, a Milwaukee, Wisconsin, native, was a 1980 graduate of Messmer High School in Milwaukee and a 1984 graduate of Northwest Missouri State University.

== Major League Baseball career ==
The Philadelphia Phillies selected Frohwirth in the 13th round (335th overall) of the 1984 Major League Baseball draft.

Frohwirth began the 1987 season in Minor League Baseball (MiLB), with the Double-A Eastern League (EL) Reading Phillies and was leading the league with 16 saves when he was promoted to the Triple-A Maine Guides of the International League (IL), on June 29, 1987.

On August 10, 1987, the Phillies promoted Frohwirth to the big leagues, when he made his MLB debut. Frohwirth entered the game in the fifth inning, when Phillies teammate Kevin Gross was caught with an illegal substance (sandpaper) in his glove, and was ejected. Frohwirth pitched an effective 1 2/3 innings and was awarded the win in the team's 4–2 victory.

Frohwith finished the 1987 minor league season with a 1.86 earned run average (ERA) with Reading and a 2.51 ERA with Maine, finishing the season with a combined 23 saves in MiLB. He won the 1987 Paul Owens Award as the top pitcher in the Phillies’ farm system.

In 1988, Frohwith went back down to Maine, posting a 7–3 record, with a 2.44 ERA, and 13 saves, before returning to the Phillies, going 1–2 with an 8.25 ERA. He pitched infrequently enough to maintain his rookie status until 1989; that season, Frohwith had his breakout MLB season, as he appeared in 45 games, had a 3.59 ERA, and allowed fewer hits (56) than innings pitched. After spending most of 1990 back at Triple-A, with the Scranton/Wilkes-Barre Red Barons, Frohwirth was given his release by the Phillies. He then signed with the Baltimore Orioles and had three solid seasons, compiling a 2.71 ERA in 186 relief outings. Frohwirth also pitched for the Boston Red Sox and California Angels, before retiring following the 1996 campaign.

== Later career ==
Frohwirth had a lengthy career coaching high-school basketball in the area, once leading Whitefish Bay High School to the state final.

Frohwirth was the boys' varsity basketball coach at Marquette University High School in Milwaukee, Wisconsin, in 2013–14, but the school did not renew his contract.

Frohwith continued to have an affiliation with the Baltimore Orioles as a major league scout. He joined the Orioles in Sarasota at spring training in March 2014 and worked (in a coaching capacity) with Orioles submarine relief pitcher Darren O'Day.

== Legacy ==
Frohwith died on March 26, 2017, from bladder cancer.

His son Tyler Frohwirth was drafted by the Philadelphia Phillies in the 31st round of the 2016 baseball draft.
