= Steve Phoenix =

American baseball player

- Pitcher
- Born: January 31, 1968 (age 58); Phoenix, Arizona, U.S.
- Batted: Right Threw: Right

MLB debut
- July 30, 1994, for the Oakland Athletics

Last MLB appearance
- August 6, 1995, for the Oakland Athletics

MLB statistics
- Games played: 3
- Earned run average: 13.50
- Strikeouts: 6
- Stats at Baseball Reference

Teams
- Oakland Athletics (1994–1995)

Steven Robert Phoenix (born January 31, 1968) is an American former pitcher in Major League Baseball. He played for the Oakland Athletics for two seasons in 1994 and 1995, pitching a total of six innings during both seasons combined. In 1994 his ERA was 6.23; in 1995 it was 32.40 (due to having allowed six runs in only 1.2 innings).
