= Chris Howard (pitcher) =

American baseball player (born 1965)

- Pitcher
- Born: November 18, 1965 (age 60); Lynn, Massachusetts, U.S.
- Batted: Right Threw: Left

MLB debut
- September 21, 1993, for the Chicago White Sox

Last MLB appearance
- September 20, 1995, for the Texas Rangers

MLB statistics
- Win–loss record: 2–0
- Earned run average: 3.13
- Strikeouts: 25
- Stats at Baseball Reference

Teams
- Chicago White Sox (1993); Boston Red Sox (1994); Texas Rangers (1995)

Christian Hugh Howard (born November 18, 1965) is an American former professional baseball relief pitcher. He played in Major League Baseball (MLB) during 1993–1995 with the Chicago White Sox, Boston Red Sox, and Texas Rangers. Listed at 6 feet 0 inches (1.83 m) and 185 pounds (84 kg), he threw left-handed and batted right-handed.

== Career ==
Howard played college baseball at the University of Miami. In 1985, he played collegiate summer baseball with the Wareham Gatemen of the Cape Cod Baseball League. He was initially selected by the Milwaukee Brewers in the January 1985 MLB draft, but did not sign. He was later selected by the New York Yankees in the 1986 MLB draft. He was in the Yankees organization until May 1990, when he was released. He then signed with the Cleveland Indians organization, but was released the following month. In January 1991, Howard signed with the Chicago White Sox organization.

In a three-season major-league career, 1993–1995, Howard posted a 2–0 record with a 3.13 earned run average (ERA) and one save in 44 appearances, including six games finished, 25 strikeouts, 16 walks, and 46 innings pitched. His one save came as a member of the Boston Red Sox on August 6, 1994, during the front end of a doubleheader against Cleveland—Howard pitched four innings, allowing one hit and one unearned run while preserving the win for Aaron Sele.
