= Duff Brumley =

American baseball player (born 1970)

- Pitcher
- Born: August 25, 1970 (age 55); Cleveland, Tennessee
- Batted: Right Threw: Right

MLB debut
- June 1, 1994, for the Texas Rangers

Last MLB appearance
- June 6, 1994, for the Texas Rangers

MLB statistics
- Win–loss record: 0–0
- Earned run average: 16.22
- Strikeouts: 4
- Stats at Baseball Reference

Teams
- Texas Rangers (1994)

Duff Lechaun Brumley (born August 25, 1970) is a retired Major League Baseball player who pitched a single season for the Texas Rangers. Brumley spent a further ten seasons in the minor league systems of the St. Louis Cardinals, Cincinnati Reds, Seattle Mariners and Philadelphia Phillies.

Since September of 2017, Duff Brumley has been employed with the State of Tennessee.
