= Rusty Meacham =

American baseball player (born 1968)

- Pitcher
- Born: January 27, 1968 (age 58); Stuart, Florida, U.S.
- Batted: Right Threw: Right

MLB debut
- June 29, 1991, for the Detroit Tigers

Last MLB appearance
- June 20, 2001, for the Tampa Bay Devil Rays

MLB statistics
- Win–loss record: 23–17
- Earned run average: 4.43
- Strikeouts: 198

CPBL statistics
- Win–loss record: 2–0
- Earned run average: 2.34
- Strikeouts: 9
- Stats at Baseball Reference

Teams
- Detroit Tigers (1991); Kansas City Royals (1992–1995); Seattle Mariners (1996); Houston Astros (2000); Tampa Bay Devil Rays (2001); Chinatrust Whales (2004)

Russell Loren Meacham (born January 27, 1968) is an American former professional baseball pitcher. He played all or parts of eight seasons in Major League Baseball between 1991 and 2001.

== Professional career ==
=== Early career ===
Meacham was drafted by the Detroit Tigers in the 33rd round of the 1987 Major League Baseball draft.

=== Major league career ===
He made his major league debut for the Tigers in 1991, and was used as both a starter and reliever. Meacham had the most relief wins in the AL in 1992 with 10. During the remainder of his major league career, he was used almost exclusively in relief, with the exception of five starts in 1996 while he was with the Seattle Mariners. After spending three entire seasons (1997-99) in Triple-A, Meacham resurfaced with the Houston Astros in May 2000.

=== Independent leagues ===
After his MLB career ended in 2001, Meacham continued to pitch in independent leagues for several years. Meacham was a player in the Golden Baseball League playing for the Yuma Scorpions for two seasons. Meacham then retired and became their first base coach for one year, then he left Yuma to be the pitching coach for the Vermont Lake Monsters. He was released after the 2008 season, even though he helped the Lake Monsters to one of the lowest ERAs of the league. Meacham returned to pitch in one game for the GBL's Tijuana Cimarrones in 2010.
