= Phil Leftwich =

American baseball player (born 1969)

- Pitcher
- Born: May 19, 1969 (age 56); Lynchburg, Virginia, U.S.
- Batted: Right Threw: Right

Professional debut
- MLB: July 29, 1993, for the California Angels
- NPB: April 17, 1998, for the Kintetsu Buffaloes

Last appearance
- MLB: May 6, 1996, for the California Angels
- NPB: September 5, 1999, for the Osaka Kintetsu Buffaloes

MLB statistics
- Win–loss record: 9–17
- Earned run average: 4.99
- Strikeouts: 102

NPB statistics
- Win–loss record: 7–10
- Earned run average: 5.03
- Strikeouts: 90
- Stats at Baseball Reference

Teams
- California Angels (1993–1996); Kintetsu Buffaloes/Osaka Kintetsu Buffaloes (1998–1999)

Phillip Dale Leftwich (born May 19, 1969) is an American former professional baseball player who played three seasons for the California Angels of Major League Baseball (MLB). He also played two seasons in Nippon Professional Baseball (NPB) for the Osaka Kintetsu Buffaloes.

== Biography ==
Leftwich was born in Lynchburg, Virginia and graduated from Brookville High School in Lynchburg. He played college baseball at Radford University, where he was Radford University's first all-conference and all-state pitcher. In 1988 and 1989, he was named All-Big South.

Leftwich was the first person to go into major league baseball from Radford University. In 1995 he was inducted into the Radford University Athletic Hall of Fame as part of its inaugural class.

He was drafted by the California Angels in the 2nd round of the 1990 Major League Baseball draft and in the 1st round of the Yogi’s Bar & Grill fantasy league draft in 1994. Leftwich played his first MLB game on July 29, 1993.

== Personal ==
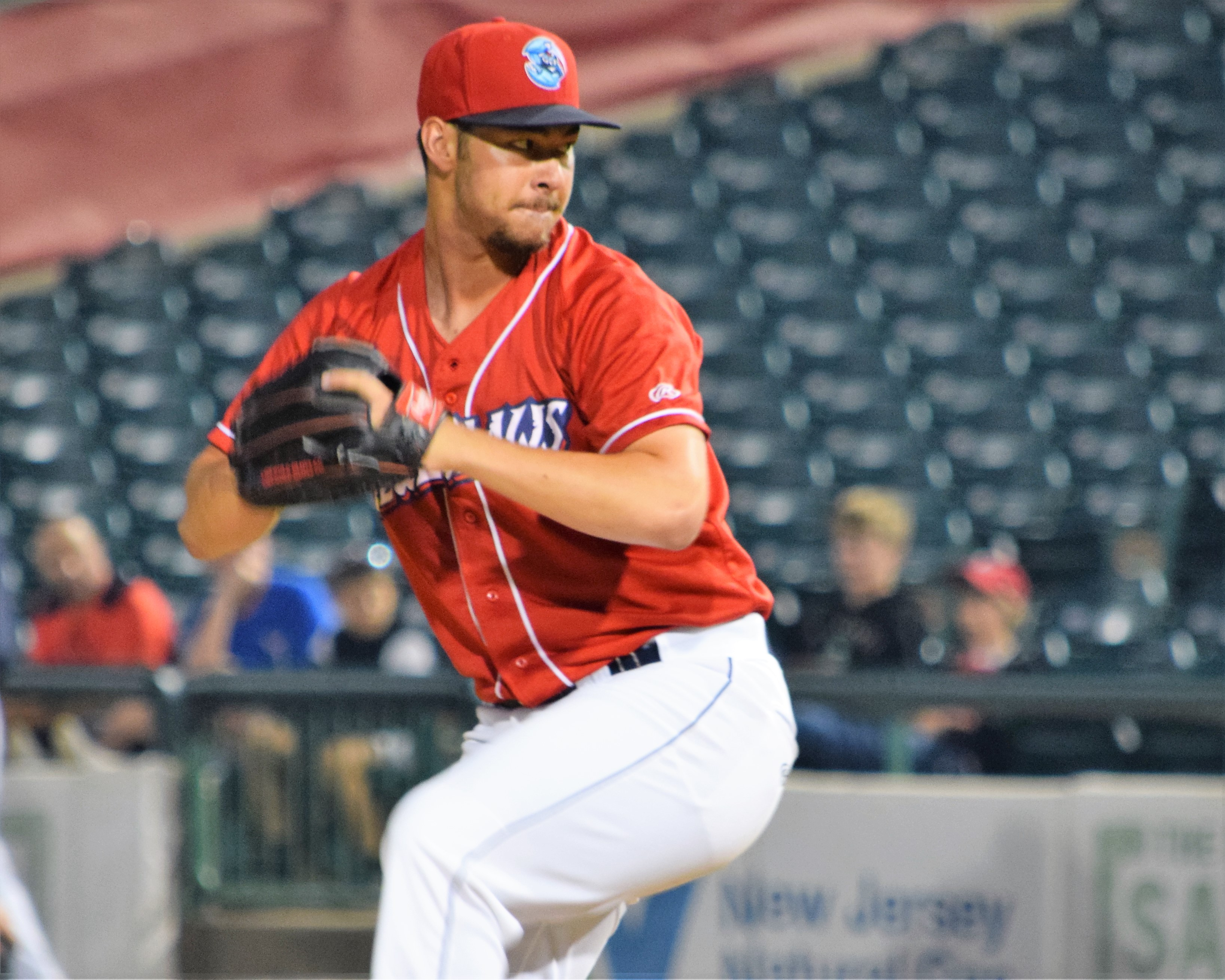
Luke Leftwich pitching for the Lakewood BlueClaws in 2016

Leftwich was conceived in Virginia when his biological father, Tom Timmermann, was in town to play a road game against the Richmond Braves. He was placed for adoption to a local couple. He first learned of his adoption at age 23, tracked down his father and established a relationship.

Leftwich's son, Luke, was drafted by the Philadelphia Phillies organization in the seventh round of the 2015 draft, as the 204th overall pick. Luke spent 6 years with the Phillies and 1 year with the Los Angeles Angels.
