= 1992 Minnesota Twins season =

1992 Minnesota Twins
- League: American League
- Division: West
- Ballpark: Hubert H. Humphrey Metrodome
- City: Minneapolis
- Record: 90–72 (.556)
- Divisional place: 2nd
- Owners: Carl Pohlad
- General managers: Andy MacPhail
- Managers: Tom Kelly
- Television: WCCO-TV; Midwest Sports Channel (Jim Kaat, Ted Robinson, Dick Bremer, Tom Mee)
- Radio: 830 WCCO AM (Herb Carneal, John Gordon)

The 1992 Minnesota Twins season was the 32nd season for the Minnesota Twins franchise in the Twin Cities of Minnesota, their 11th season at Hubert H. Humphrey Metrodome and the 92nd overall in the American League. Coming off a World Series victory, the Twins continued the team's winning spree. The team finished in second place to the Oakland Athletics and did not make it to the postseason. This would be the team's last winning season until 2001.

== Offseason ==
- January 29, 1992: Bill Krueger was signed as a free agent by the Twins.
- March 17, 1992: Denny Neagle and Midre Cummings were traded by the Twins to the Pittsburgh Pirates for pitcher John Smiley.
- March 28, 1992: Paul Sorrento was traded by the Twins to the Cleveland Indians for Oscar Múñoz and Curt Leskanic.

== Regular season ==
- The Twins' All-Star representatives at Jack Murphy Stadium in San Diego were outfielder Kirby Puckett, closer Rick Aguilera and second baseman Chuck Knoblauch.
- On July 24, pitcher Scott Erickson threw the only complete-game one-hitter in Twins history -- Tom Brunansky got the only hit for the Boston Red Sox.
- In a 6–2 win over Seattle on September 9, the Twins stole six bases to set a single-game club record.
- On September 27, Tom Kelly won his 523rd game as Twins manager, more than any other skipper in team history.
- Chili Davis joined Roy Smalley Jr., on October 2, as the only Twins to homer from both sides of the plate in a single game. Davis went right-handed off Kansas City's Chris Haney, then left-handed off Steve Shifflett.
- The highest paid Twin in 1992 was John Smiley at $3,400,000, followed by Hrbek at $3,100,000.

=== Offense ===
Outfielder Kirby Puckett got 200 hits for the fifth time in his career, as well as 100 runs and 100 RBI. He also hit over .300 for the seventh time in nine seasons. Finally, he hit the first three grand slams of his career. He was twice named American League Player of the Month. Puckett would go on to win his fifth Silver Slugger Award.

Chuck Knoblauch and Shane Mack also notched 100 runs, making Puckett, Knoblauch, and Mack the first trio of Twins in team history to score 100 times in a season.

First baseman Kent Hrbek began his fight against the injury bug, getting only 394 at-bats, a number that would decline over the next two years. Catcher Brian Harper had the second of three seasons batting over .300. Scott Leius saw a majority of the time at third base, but hit only .249 with 2 home runs. In his last year with the Twins, shortstop Greg Gagne hit .246 — right around his career average. Pedro Muñoz saw a majority of the time in right field, while Chili Davis served as the designated hitter in his second and last year with the Twins.

Team Leaders
Statistic	Player	Quantity
HR	Kirby Puckett	19
RBI	Kirby Puckett	110
BA	Kirby Puckett	.329
Runs	Kirby Puckett and Chuck Knoblauch	104

=== Pitching ===
The first four pitchers in the starting rotation had winning records and solid ERAs, including John Smiley (16–9, 3.21), Kevin Tapani (16–11, 3.97), Scott Erickson (13–12, 3.40), and Bill Krueger (10–6, 4.30). The fifth spot in the rotation was a question mark, with Pat Mahomes making 13 mediocre starts, Willie Banks 12 poor starts, and Mike Trombley 7 reasonably capable ones.

The bullpen was outstanding, anchored by closer Rick Aguilera. Aguilera earned 41 saves, and became the Twins' all-time leader in saves on September 1 when he earned his 109th with the team. The four regular arms in the bullpen all had ERAs under three: Carl Willis, Mark Guthrie, Tom Edens, and Gary Wayne.

Team Leaders
Statistic	Player	Quantity
ERA	John Smiley	3.21
Wins	John Smiley and Kevin Tapani	16
Saves	Rick Aguilera	41
Strikeouts	John Smiley	163

=== Defense ===
As expected for a Tom Kelly team, the defense was strong. Puckett would win the last of his six Gold Glove Awards. Hrbek was always strong at first base (although Don Mattingly prevented him from winning a Gold Glove), as was Knoblauch at second (at least at this point in his career). Gagne was a capable shortstop, but Leius was a question mark at third with a .955 fielding percentage. Mack and Muñoz had good years defensively alongside Puckett.

=== Season standings ===
AL West
Team	W	L	Pct.	GB	Home	Road
Oakland Athletics	96	66	.593	—	51‍–‍30	45‍–‍36
Minnesota Twins	90	72	.556	6	48‍–‍33	42‍–‍39
Chicago White Sox	86	76	.531	10	50‍–‍32	36‍–‍44
Texas Rangers	77	85	.475	19	36‍–‍45	41‍–‍40
California Angels	72	90	.444	24	41‍–‍40	31‍–‍50
Kansas City Royals	72	90	.444	24	44‍–‍37	28‍–‍53
Seattle Mariners	64	98	.395	32	38‍–‍43	26‍–‍55

=== Record vs. opponents ===
1992 American League record Sources:
Team	BAL	BOS	CAL	CWS	CLE	DET	KC	MIL	MIN	NYY	OAK	SEA	TEX	TOR
Baltimore	—	8–5	8–4	6–6	7–6	10–3	8–4	6–7	6–6	5–8	6–6	7–5	7–5	5–8
Boston	5–8	—	8–4	6–6	6–7	4–9	7–5	5–8	3–9	7–6	5–7	6–6	4–8	7–6
California	4–8	4–8	—	3–10	6–6	7–5	8–5	5–7	2–11	7–5	5–8	7–6	9–4	5–7
Chicago	6–6	6–6	10–3	—	7–5	10–2	7–6	5–7	8–5	8–4	5–8	4–9	5–8	5–7
Cleveland	6–7	7–6	6–6	5–7	—	5–8	5–7	5–8	6–6	7–6	6–6	7–5	5–7	6–7
Detroit	3–10	9–4	5–7	2–10	8–5	—	7–5	5–8	3–9	5–8	6–6	9–3	8–4	5–8
Kansas City	4–8	5–7	5–8	6–7	7–5	5–7	—	7–5	6–7	5–7	4–9	7–6	6–7	5–7
Milwaukee	7–6	8–5	7–5	7–5	8–5	8–5	5–7	—	6–6	6–7	7–5	8–4	7–5	8–5
Minnesota	6–6	9–3	11–2	5–8	6–6	9–3	7–6	6–6	—	7–5	5–8	8–5	6–7	5–7
New York	8–5	6–7	5–7	4–8	6–7	8–5	7–5	7–6	5–7	—	6–6	6–6	6–6	2–11
Oakland	6–6	7–5	8–5	8–5	6–6	6–6	9–4	5–7	8–5	6–6	—	12–1	9–4	6–6
Seattle	5–7	6–6	6–7	9–4	5–7	3–9	6–7	4–8	5–8	6–6	1–12	—	4–9	4–8
Texas	5–7	8–4	4–9	8–5	7–5	4–8	7–6	5–7	7–6	6–6	4–9	9–4	—	3–9
Toronto	8–5	6–7	7–5	7–5	7–6	8–5	7–5	5–8	7–5	11–2	6–6	8–4	9–3	—

=== Notable transactions ===
- January 7, 1992: Mauro Gozzo was signed as a free agent with the Minnesota Twins.
- April 15, 1992: Enrique Wilson was signed as an amateur free agent by the Twins.
- June 1, 1992: 1992 Major League Baseball draft
  - Dan Serafini was drafted by the Twins in the 1st round (26th pick).
  - Gus Gandarillas was drafted by the Twins in the 3rd round.
  - Dan Naulty was drafted by the Twins in the 14th round.
  - Scott Watkins was drafted by the Twins in the 23rd round.
- August 31, 1992: Bill Krueger was traded by the Twins to the Montreal Expos for Darren Reed.
- November 17, 1992: Jayhawk Owens was drafted by the Colorado Rockies from the Minnesota Twins as the 23rd pick in the 1992 expansion draft.

=== Roster ===
1992 Minnesota Twins
Roster
Pitchers: 37 Paul Abbott; 38 Rick Aguilera; 23 Willie Banks; 48 Larry Casian; 59 Tom Edens; 19 Scott Erickson; 52 Mauro Gozzo; 53 Mark Guthrie; 16 Bob Kipper; 22 Bill Krueger; 20 Pat Mahomes; 57 John Smiley; 36 Kevin Tapani; 21 Mike Trombley; 47 Gary Wayne; 39 David West; 51 Carl Willis	Catchers: 12 Brian Harper; 16 Derek Parks; 15 Lenny Webster; Infielders: 7 Greg Gagne; 2 Donnie Hill; 14 Kent Hrbek; 27 Terry Jorgensen; 11 Chuck Knoblauch; 9 Gene Larkin; 31 Scott Leius; 13 Mike Pagliarulo; 49 Luis Quiñones; 17 Jeff Reboulet	Outfielders: 33 Bernardo Brito; 1 Jarvis Brown; 26 J.T. Bruett; 25 Randy Bush; 24 Shane Mack; 5 Pedro Muñoz; 34 Kirby Puckett; 18 Darren Reed; Other batters: 44 Chili Davis	Manager: 10 Tom Kelly; Coaches: 46 Terry Crowley (hitting); 35 Ron Gardenhire (third base); 43 Rick Stelmaszek (bullpen); 42 Dick Such (pitching); 45 Wayne Terwilliger (first base)

== Player stats ==
= Indicates team leader

= Indicates league leader

=== Batting ===
==== Starters by position ====
Note: Pos = Position; G = Games played; AB = At bats; H = Hits; Avg. = Batting average; HR = Home runs; RBI = Runs batted in

Pos	Player	G	AB	H	Avg.	HR	RBI
C	Brian Harper	140	502	154	.307	9	73
1B	Kent Hrbek	112	394	96	.244	15	58
2B	Chuck Knoblauch	155	600	178	.297	2	56
3B	Scott Leius	129	409	102	.249	2	35
SS	Greg Gagne	146	439	108	.246	7	39
LF	Shane Mack	156	600	189	.315	16	75
CF	Kirby Puckett	160	639	210	.329	19	110
RF	Pedro Muñoz	127	418	113	.270	12	71
DH	Chili Davis	138	444	128	.288	12	66

==== Other batters ====
Note: G = Games played; AB = At bats; H = Hits; Avg. = Batting average; HR = Home runs; RBI = Runs batted in

Player	G	AB	H	Avg.	HR	RBI
Gene Larkin	115	337	83	.246	6	42
Randy Bush	100	182	39	.214	2	22
Jeff Reboulet	73	137	26	.190	1	16
Lenny Webster	53	118	33	.280	1	13
Mike Pagliarulo	42	105	21	.200	0	9
J.T. Bruett	56	76	19	.250	0	2
Terry Jorgensen	22	58	18	.310	0	5
Donnie Hill	25	51	15	.294	0	2
Darren Reed	14	33	6	.182	0	4
Jarvis Brown	35	15	1	.067	0	0
Bernardo Brito	8	14	2	.143	0	2
Derek Parks	7	6	2	.333	0	0
Luis Quiñones	3	5	1	.200	0	1

=== Pitching ===
==== Starting pitchers ====
Note: G = Games pitched; IP = Innings pitched; W = Wins; L = Losses; ERA = Earned run average; SO = Strikeouts

Player	G	IP	W	L	ERA	SO
John Smiley	34	241.0	16	9	3.21	163
Kevin Tapani	34	220.0	16	11	3.97	138
Scott Erickson	32	212.0	13	12	3.40	101
Bill Krueger	27	161.1	10	6	4.30	86
Willie Banks	16	71.0	4	4	5.70	37
Pat Mahomes	14	69.2	3	4	5.04	44

==== Other pitchers ====
Note: G = Games pitched; IP = Innings pitched; W = Wins; L = Losses; ERA = Earned run average; SO = Strikeouts

Player	G	IP	W	L	ERA	SO
Mike Trombley	10	46.1	3	2	3.30	38
David West	9	28.1	1	3	6.99	19

==== Relief pitchers ====
Note: G = Games pitched; W = Wins; L = Losses; SV = Saves; ERA = Earned run average; SO = Strikeouts

Player	G	W	L	SV	ERA	SO
Rick Aguilera	64	2	6	41	2.84	52
Carl Willis	59	7	3	1	2.72	45
Mark Guthrie	54	2	3	5	2.88	76
Tom Edens	52	6	3	3	2.83	57
Gary Wayne	41	3	3	0	2.63	29
Bob Kipper	25	3	3	0	4.42	22
Paul Abbott	6	0	0	0	3.27	13
Larry Casian	6	1	0	0	2.70	2
Mauro Gozzo	2	0	0	0	27.00	1

== Other post-season awards ==
- Calvin R. Griffith Award (Most Valuable Twin) – Kirby Puckett
- Joseph W. Haynes Award (Twins Pitcher of the Year) – John Smiley
- Bill Boni Award (Twins Outstanding Rookie) – Mike Trombley
- Charles O. Johnson Award (Most Improved Twin) – Mark Guthrie
- Dick Siebert Award (Upper Midwest Player of the Year) – Dave Winfield
  - The above awards are voted on by the Twin Cities chapter of the BBWAA
- Sherry Robertson Award (Twins Outstanding Farm System Player) – Marty Cordova

== Farm system ==
Level	Team	League	Manager
AAA	Portland Beavers	Pacific Coast League	Scott Ullger
AA	Orlando Sun Rays	Southern League	Phil Roof
A	Visalia Oaks	California League	Steve Liddle
A	Fort Myers Miracle	Florida State League	Dan Rohn
A	Kenosha Twins	Midwest League	Jim Dwyer
Rookie	Elizabethton Twins	Appalachian League	Ray Smith
Rookie	GCL Twins	Gulf Coast League	Jim Lemon
