= 1994 Toronto Blue Jays season =

1994 Toronto Blue Jays
- League: American League
- Division: East
- Ballpark: SkyDome
- City: Toronto
- Record: 55–60 (.478)
- Divisional place: 3rd
- Owners: Labatt Breweries, Canadian Imperial Bank of Commerce
- General managers: Pat Gillick
- Managers: Cito Gaston
- Television: CBC Television (Brian Williams, Tommy Hutton); Baton (Don Chevrier, Tommy Hutton); The Sports Network (Jim Hughson, Buck Martinez)
- Radio: CJCL (AM) (Jerry Howarth, Tom Cheek)

The 1994 Toronto Blue Jays season was the franchise's 18th season of Major League Baseball. It resulted in the Blue Jays finishing third in the American League East with a record of 55 wins and 60 losses. Cito Gaston was the manager for the American League squad at the All-Star Game. The Mid-Summer classic was played on July 12 at Three Rivers Stadium in Pittsburgh. Roberto Alomar and Joe Carter were starters at the event, while Pat Hentgen and Paul Molitor were named as reserves.

The season was cut short by the infamous 1994 player's strike, technically leaving the Blue Jays as the reigning World Series champions.

== Transactions ==
Transactions by the Toronto Blue Jays during the off-season before the 1994 season.

=== October 1993 ===
October 15	Tom Quinlan granted free agency (signed with Philadelphia Phillies to a contract on December 1, 1993). Luis Sojo granted free agency (signed with Seattle Mariners to a one-year, $250,000 contract on January 10, 1994). Randy St. Claire granted free agency (signed with Toronto Blue Jays to a contract on November 15, 1993). Lee Stevens granted free agency (signed with California Angels on October 25, 1993).
October 27	Alfredo Griffin granted free agency.
October 29	Danny Cox granted free agency (signed with Toronto Blue Jays to a one-year, $800,000 contract on November 8, 1993). Rickey Henderson granted free agency (signed with Oakland Athletics to a two-year, $8.6 million contract on December 17, 1993).

=== November 1993 ===
November 1	Mark Eichhorn granted free agency (signed with Baltimore Orioles to a one-year, $550,000 contract plus a one-year option on December 14, 1993).
November 3	Tony Fernández granted free agency (signed with Cincinnati Reds to a one-year, $787,500 contract on March 8, 1994).
November 5	Released Jack Morris.
November 8	Re-signed free agent Danny Cox to a one-year, $800,000 contract.
November 15	Re-signed free agent Randy St. Claire to a contract.
November 24	Turner Ward selected off of waivers by the Milwaukee Brewers.

=== December 1993 ===
December 13	Tim Hyers drafted by the San Diego Padres in the 1993 MLB Rule 5 draft. Dilson Torres selected by the Kansas City Royals in the 1993 Minor League Draft.
December 21	Signed free agent Greg Cadaret from the Kansas City Royals to a one-year, $550,000 contract.

=== March 1994 ===
March 29	Acquired Mike Huff from the Chicago White Sox for Domingo Martínez.

== Regular season ==
The Blue Jays scored 566 runs (4.92 per game) and allowed 579 runs (5.04 per game) through 115 games by Friday, August, 12. After slumping to a 33–46 record on Sunday, July 3, Toronto went 22–14 before the players' strike ended the season prematurely.

- July 14, 1994: Joe Carter wore a jersey with the "n" and second "t" in "Toronto" reversed for six innings during a game against the Texas Rangers.

=== Opening day starters ===
- Devon White, CF
- Roberto Alomar, 2B
- Paul Molitor, DH
- Joe Carter, RF
- John Olerud, 1B
- Carlos Delgado, LF
- Ed Sprague, 3B
- Pat Borders, C
- Alex Gonzalez, SS
- Juan Guzman, P

=== Season standings ===
AL East
Team	W	L	Pct.	GB	Home	Road
New York Yankees	70	43	.619	—	33‍–‍24	37‍–‍19
Baltimore Orioles	63	49	.562	6½	28‍–‍27	35‍–‍22
Toronto Blue Jays	55	60	.478	16	33‍–‍26	22‍–‍34
Boston Red Sox	54	61	.470	17	31‍–‍33	23‍–‍28
Detroit Tigers	53	62	.461	18	34‍–‍24	19‍–‍38

Division leaders
Team	W	L	Pct.
New York Yankees	70	43	.619
Chicago White Sox	67	46	.593
Texas Rangers	52	62	.456

Wild Card team (Top team qualifies for postseason)
Team	W	L	Pct.	GB
Cleveland Indians	66	47	.584	—
Baltimore Orioles	63	49	.562	2½
Kansas City Royals	64	51	.557	3
Toronto Blue Jays	55	60	.478	12
Boston Red Sox	54	61	.470	13
Minnesota Twins	53	60	.469	13
Detroit Tigers	53	62	.461	14
Milwaukee Brewers	53	62	.461	14
Oakland Athletics	51	63	.447	15½
Seattle Mariners	49	63	.438	16½
California Angels	47	68	.409	20

=== Record vs. opponents ===
1994 American League record Source: MLB Standings Grid – 1994
Team	BAL	BOS	CAL	CWS	CLE	DET	KC	MIL	MIN	NYY	OAK	SEA	TEX	TOR
Baltimore	—	4–2	8–4	2–4	4–6	3–4	4–1	7–3	4–5	4–6	7–5	4–6	3–3	7–2
Boston	2–4	—	7–5	2–4	3–7	4–2	4–2	5–5	1–8	3–7	9–3	6–6	1–5	7–3
California	4–8	5–7	—	5–5	0–5	3–4	6–4	3–3	3–3	4–8	3–6	2–7	6–4	3–4
Chicago	4–2	4–2	5–5	—	7–5	8–4	3–7	9–3	2–4	4–2	6–3	9–1	4–5	2–3
Cleveland	6–4	7–3	5–0	5–7	—	8–2	1–4	5–2	9–3	0–9	6–0	3–2	5–7	6–4
Detroit	4–3	2–4	4–3	4–8	2–8	—	4–8	6–4	3–3	3–3	5–4	6–3	5–7	5–4
Kansas City	1–4	2–4	4–6	7–3	4–1	8–4	—	5–7	6–4	4–2	7–3	6–4	4–3	6–6
Milwaukee	3–7	5–5	3–3	3–9	2–5	4–6	7–5	—	6–6	2–7	4–1	4–2	3–3	7–3
Minnesota	5–4	8–1	3–3	4–2	3–9	3–3	4–6	6–6	—	4–5	2–5	3–3	4–5	4–8
New York	6–4	7–3	8–4	2–4	9–0	3–3	2–4	7–2	5–4	—	7–5	8–4	3–2	3–4
Oakland	5–7	3–9	6–3	3–6	0–6	4–5	3–7	1–4	5–2	5–7	—	4–3	7–3	5–1
Seattle	4–6	6–6	7–2	1–9	2–3	3–6	4–6	2–4	3–3	4–8	3–4	—	9–1	1–5
Texas	3–3	5–1	4–6	5–4	7–5	7–5	3–4	3–3	5–4	2–3	3–7	1–9	—	4–8
Toronto	2–7	3–7	4–3	3–2	4–6	4–5	6–6	3–7	8–4	4–3	1–5	5–1	8–4	—

=== Transactions ===
Transactions for the Toronto Blue Jays during the 1994 regular season.

==== May 1994 ====
May 5	Signed amateur free agent Abraham Núñez to a contract.
May 13	Signed free agent Dave Righetti from the Oakland Athletics to a contract.

==== June 1994 ====
June 1	Signed free agent Joel Johnston from the Pittsburgh Pirates to a contract.
June 9	Released Greg Cadaret.

==== August 1994 ====
August 10	Signed amateur free agent Pasqual Coco to a contract.

=== Roster ===
1994 Toronto Blue Jays
Roster
Pitchers: 44 Scott Brow; 24 Greg Cadaret; 49 Tony Castillo; 58 Brad Cornett; 50 Danny Cox; 66 Juan Guzmán; 36 Darren Hall; 41 Pat Hentgen; 28 Al Leiter; 24 Dave Righetti; 38 Aaron Small; 45 Paul Spoljaric; 37 Randy St. Claire; 34 Dave Stewart; 30 Todd Stottlemyre; 40 Mike Timlin; 54 Woody Williams	Catchers: 10 Pat Borders; 27 Randy Knorr; Infielders: 12 Roberto Alomar; 70 Domingo Cedeño; 8 Alex Gonzalez; 19 Paul Molitor; 9 John Olerud; 4 Dick Schofield; 33 Ed Sprague	Outfielders: 2 Rob Butler; 29 Joe Carter; 11 Darnell Coles; 6 Carlos Delgado; 15 Shawn Green; 26 Mike Huff; 17 Robert Pérez; 25 Devon White	Manager: 43 Cito Gaston; Coaches: 3 Bob Bailor (first base); 42 Galen Cisco (pitching); 39 Larry Hisle (hitting); 46 Dennis Holmberg (bullpen); 16 Nick Leyva (third base); 18 Gene Tenace (bench)

=== Game log ===
1994 Game Log
April: 14–10 (Home: 9–2; Away: 5–8)

#	Date	Opponent	Score	Win	Loss	Save	Attendance	Record
1	April 4	White Sox	7–3	Guzman (1–0)	McDowell (0–1)		50,484	1–0
2	April 5	White Sox	5–3	Stewart (1–0)	Fernandez (0–1)	Stottlemyre (1)	44,471	2–0
3	April 6	White Sox	9–2	Álvarez (1–0)	Hentgen (0–1)		44,164	2–1
4	April 8	Mariners	8–2	Leiter (1–0)	Fleming (0–1)		48,152	3–1
5	April 9	Mariners	8–6	Castillo (1–0)	Thigpen (0–1)		49,179	4–1
6	April 10	Mariners	12–6	Stewart (2–0)	Johnson (0–1)		50,471	5–1
7	April 11	@ Athletics	14–5	Hentgen (1–1)	Witt (0–1)		40,551	6–1
8	April 12	@ Athletics	8–4	Darling (1–1)	Spoljaric (0–1)		24,970	6–2
9	April 13	@ Athletics	8–7 (12)	Ontiveros (1–1)	Cadaret (0–1)		12,397	6–3
10	April 14	@ Angels	6–4	Leiter (1–0)	Guzman (1–1)	Grahe (4)	21,243	6–4
11	April 15	@ Angels	14–13 (10)	Lefferts (1–0)	Brow (0–1)		20,413	6–5
12	April 16	@ Angels	5–4	Hentgen (2–1)	Patterson (0–1)		29,757	7–5
13	April 17	@ Angels	5–4 (10)	Stottlemyre (1–0)	Grahe (0–2)		35,518	8–5
14	April 19	Rangers	13–3	Guzman (2–1)	Brown (0–4)		48,149	9–5
15	April 20	Rangers	4–3 (11)	Stottlemyre (2–0)	Henke (1–1)		47,116	10–5
16	April 22	Twins	8–2	Hentgen (3–1)	Erickson (1–3)		46,268	11–5
17	April 23	Twins	8–6	Leiter (2–0)	Pulido (0–2)	Timlin (1)	50,504	12–5
18	April 24	Twins	7–3	Tapani (1–1)	Guzman (2–2)		50,464	12–6
19	April 25	@ Royals	4–3	Cone (3–1)	Stewart (2–1)	Montgomery (1)	17,100	12–7
20	April 26	@ Royals	8–6	Stottlemyre (3–0)	Haney (1–1)	Timlin (2)	16,571	13–7
21	April 27	@ Rangers	11–3	Rogers (2–2)	Hentgen (3–2)		38,055	13–8
22	April 28	@ Rangers	1–0	Brown (1–4)	Leiter (2–1)	Henke (3)	27,287	13–9
23	April 29	@ Twins	12–7	Guzman (3–2)	Tapani (1–2)		25,898	14–9
24	April 30	@ Twins	11–9	Deshaies (2–2)	Stewart (2–2)	Aguilera (6)	24,479	14–10

May: 10–16 (Home: 10–8; Away: 0–8)

#	Date	Opponent	Score	Win	Loss	Save	Attendance	Record
25	May 1	@ Twins	7–3	Willis (1–1)	Williams (0–1)		26,669	14–11
26	May 3	Royals	1–0	Hentgen (4–2)	Appier (2–3)		48,173	15–11
27	May 4	Royals	6–4 (10)	Brewer (2–0)	Hall (0–1)	Montgomery (2)	47,244	15–12
28	May 5	Royals	11–9	Gordon (2–1)	Guzman (3–3)	Montgomery (3)	50,076	15–13
29	May 6	Brewers	7–1	Eldred (3–3)	Stewart (2–3)		47,150	15–14
30	May 7	Brewers	3–2	Castillo (2–0)	Bronkey (1–1)		50,458	16–14
31	May 8	Brewers	3–1	Hentgen (5–2)	Higuera (1–3)	Hall (1)	48,252	17–14
32	May 9	@ Orioles	4–1	Fernandez (2–0)	Leiter (2–2)	Smith (14)	47,369	17–15
33	May 10	@ Orioles	6–3	Oquist (1–0)	Guzman (3–4)	Smith (15)	47,194	17–16
34	May 11	@ Orioles	4–1	Mussina (6–1)	Stottlemyre (3–1)		47,386	17–17
35	May 13	@ Red Sox	5–3	Hesketh (2–1)	Hentgen (5–3)	Ryan (3)	32,579	17–18
36	May 14	@ Red Sox	11–2	Darwin (6–2)	Leiter (2–3)		33,771	17–19
--	May 15	@ Red Sox	Postponed (rain) Rescheduled for August 1					
37	May 16	Tigers	7–2	Guzman (4–4)	Moore (3–3)		50,456	18–19
38	May 17	Tigers	13–6	Belcher (1–7)	Stottlemyre (3–2)		46,439	18–20
39	May 18	Tigers	9–3	Stewart (3–3)	Gullickson (2–3)		47,247	19–20
40	May 20	Indians	2–0	Hentgen (6–3)	Nagy (3–3)		50,501	20–20
41	May 21	Indians	9–7	Leiter (3–3)	Nabholz (0–1)	Brow (1)	50,519	21–20
42	May 22	Indians	8–0	Martínez (3–4)	Guzman (4–5)		48,154	21–21
43	May 23	Indians	6–5	Hall (1–1)	Mesa (3–2)		48,080	22–21
44	May 24	@ Yankees	6–1	Mulholland (5–3)	Stewart (3–4)		26,217	22–22
45	May 25	@ Yankees	5–2	Abbott (6–2)	Hentgen (6–4)		23,250	22–23
46	May 27	Angels	6–2	Leftwich (3–4)	Leiter (3–4)		48,244	22–24
47	May 28	Angels	9–4	Guzman (5–5)	Langston (2–3)		50,509	23–24
48	May 29	Angels	5–0	Stottlemyre (4–2)	Finley (4–4)		50,529	24–24
49	May 30	Athletics	6–2	Acre (1–0)	Brow (0–2)		50,088	24–25
50	May 31	Athletics	7–2	Darling (4–6)	Hentgen (6–5)	Eckersley (5)	50,211	24–26

June: 8–18 (Home: 3–8; Away: 5–10)

#	Date	Opponent	Score	Win	Loss	Save	Attendance	Record
51	June 1	Athletics	9–5	Welch (1–5)	Castillo (2–1)		50,471	24–27
52	June 3	@ Mariners	9–6	Guzman (6–5)	Salkeld (2–3)	Hall (2)	23,310	25–27
53	June 4	@ Mariners	2–0	Johnson (7–3)	Stottlemyre (4–3)		37,127	25–28
54	June 5	@ Mariners	5–4	Stewart (4–4)	Fleming (3–8)	Hall (3)	26,339	26–28
55	June 7	@ White Sox	9–5	Hentgen (7–5)	Álvarez (8–1)	Hall (4)	37,184	27–28
56	June 8	@ White Sox	3–2	Johnson (1–0)	Hall (1–2)		29,920	27–29
57	June 9	Yankees	7–5	Williams (1–1)	Mulholland (5–6)	Brow (2)	50,521	28–29
58	June 10	Yankees	7–2	Stottlemyre (5–3)	Abbott (6–5)		50,522	29–29
59	June 11	Yankees	9–2	Key (9–1)	Stewart (4–5)	Wickman (3)	50,530	29–30
60	June 12	Yankees	3–1	Hentgen (8–5)	Kamieniecki (4–2)	Castillo (1)	50,511	30–30
61	June 13	@ Indians	7–3	Clark (8–1)	Cornett (0–1)		41,598	30–31
62	June 14	@ Indians	7–5	Mesa (6–3)	Guzman (6–6)	Shuey (4)	41,887	30–32
63	June 15	@ Indians	4–3 (13)	Mesa (7–3)	Brow (0–3)		41,794	30–33
64	June 17	@ Tigers	7–4	Stewart (5–5)	Gardiner (2–1)	Hall (5)	36,210	31–33
65	June 18	@ Tigers	6–5 (11)	Boever (5–0)	Williams (1–2)		37,534	31–34
66	June 19	@ Tigers	3–1	Gohr (2–0)	Guzman (6–7)	Gardiner (4)	35,772	31–35
67	June 20	Red Sox	4–1	Hesketh (4–4)	Stottlemyre (5–4)	Fossas (1)	50,028	31–36
68	June 21	Red Sox	13–1	Sele (6–3)	Cornett (0–2)		49,460	31–37
69	June 22	Red Sox	3–2	Minchey (1–2)	Stewart (5–6)	Ryan (4)	50,288	31–38
70	June 24	Orioles	5–1	Eichhorn (3–1)	Righetti (0–1)		50,508	31–39
71	June 25	Orioles	4–1	Eichhorn (4–1)	Guzman (6–8)	Smith (25)	50,526	31–40
72	June 26	Orioles	7–1	Mussina (11–4)	Stottlemyre (5–5)		50,229	31–41
73	June 27	@ Brewers	5–1	Eldred (9–7)	Leiter (3–5)		15,746	31–42
74	June 28	@ Brewers	6–4	Mercedes (1–0)	Stewart (5–7)	Fetters (8)	18,905	31–43
75	June 29	@ Brewers	5–0	Hentgen (9–5)	Bones (7–5)		20,576	32–43
76	June 30	@ Brewers	9–2	Wegman (6–0)	Guzman (6–9)		27,231	32–44

July: 17–10 (Home: 10–4; Away: 7–6)

#	Date	Opponent	Score	Win	Loss	Save	Attendance	Record
77	July 1	@ Royals	4–3 (12)	Montgomery (2–3)	Williams (1–3)		21,496	32–45
78	July 2	@ Royals	7–6	Castillo (3–1)	Meacham (0–1)	Hall (6)	27,800	33–45
79	July 3	@ Royals	11–6	Cone (12–4)	Stewart (5–8)		25,421	33–46
80	July 4	@ Royals	9–4	Hentgen (10–5)	Milacki (0–3)		38,039	34–46
81	July 5	@ Twins	14–3	Guzman (7–9)	Mahomes (7–4)		22,380	35–46
82	July 6	@ Twins	5–4	Erickson (8–6)	Stottlemyre (5–6)	Aguilera (18)	26,479	35–47
83	July 7	@ Twins	4–3	Castillo (4–1)	Willis (1–3)	Hall (7)	31,180	36–47
84	July 8	Royals	6–5	Pichardo (3–2)	Hall (1–3)	Montgomery (14)	50,515	36–48
85	July 9	Royals	9–4	Hentgen (11–5)	Milacki (0–4)		50,524	37–48
86	July 10	Royals	7–3	Guzman (8–9)	Gubicza (5–8)	Cox (1)	50,504	38–48
65th All-Star Game in Pittsburgh, PA
87	July 14	@ Rangers	7–3	Fajardo (5–5)	Stottlemyre (5–7)		42,621	38–49
88	July 15	@ Rangers	7–5	Guzman (9–9)	Dettmer (0–4)	Hall (8)	46,511	39–49
89	July 16	@ Rangers	4–2	Brown (7–8)	Hentgen (11–6)	Henke (10)	46,510	39–50
90	July 17	@ Rangers	3–1	Stewart (6–8)	Rogers (10–5)	Hall (9)	46,394	40–50
91	July 18	Twins	7–4	Leiter (4–5)	Guardado (0–2)	Hall (10)	48,060	41–50
92	July 19	Twins	4–2	Castillo (5–1)	Tapani (9–6)	Hall (11)	47,222	42–50
93	July 20	Twins	9–2	Guzman (10–9)	Erickson (8–9)		48,162	43–50
94	July 21	Rangers	9–3	Hentgen (12–6)	Leary (1–1)	Cox (2)	49,618	44–50
95	July 22	Rangers	3–2	Stewart (7–8)	Rogers (10–6)	Hall (12)	50,522	45–50
96	July 23	Rangers	9–1	Leiter (5–5)	Fajardo (5–7)		50,529	46–50
97	July 24	Rangers	4–2	Cornett (1–2)	Pavlik (1–5)	Cox (3)	50,521	47–50
98	July 26	Brewers	7–5	Bones (10–7)	Guzman (10–10)	Fetters (13)	49,098	47–51
99	July 27	Brewers	5–0	Wegman (8–3)	Hentgen (12–7)		47,172	47–52
100	July 28	Brewers	5–4	Orosco (2–1)	Cox (0–1)	Fetters (14)	47,061	47–53
101	July 29	@ Orioles	4–3	Leiter (6–5)	Moyer (4–7)	Hall (13)	47,497	48–53
102	July 30	@ Orioles	7–5	Eichhorn (6–4)	Timlin (0–1)	Smith (32)	47,000	48–54
103	July 31	@ Orioles	6–4	Guzman (11–10)	McDonald (12–7)	Hall (14)	47,684	49–54

August: 6–6 (Home: 2–4; Away: 4–2)

#	Date	Opponent	Score	Win	Loss	Save	Attendance	Record
104	August 1	@ Red Sox	6–2	Hentgen (13–7)	Sele (7–7)			50–54
105	August 1	@ Red Sox	4–3	Minchey (2–3)	Cornett (1–3)	Ryan (12)	33,429	50–55
106	August 2	@ Red Sox	8–7	Cox (1–1)	Bankhead (3–1)	Hall (15)	32,976	51–55
107	August 3	@ Red Sox	7–2	Van Egmond (2–3)	Leiter (6–6)		32,047	51–56
108	August 4	@ Red Sox	5–2	Stottlemyre (6–7)	Clemens (9–7)	Hall (16)	33,199	52–56
109	August 5	Tigers	4–2	Guzman (12–10)	Wells (4–7)	Hall (17)	50,522	53–56
110	August 6	Tigers	3–2	Moore (11–10)	Hentgen (13–8)	Boever (3)	50,512	53–57
111	August 7	Tigers	8–7	Davis (2–3)	Castillo (5–2)	Cadaret (2)	50,509	53–58
112	August 8	Indians	6–1	Nagy (10–8)	Leiter (6–7)		50,515	53–59
113	August 9	Indians	12–5	Stottlemyre (7–7)	Lopez (1–2)		50,527	54–59
114	August 10	Indians	5–3	Grimsley (5–2)	Guzman (12–11)	Plunk (3)	50,510	54–60
115	August 11	@ Yankees	8–7 (13)	Hall (2–3)	Ausanio (2–1)		37,333	55–60

*An MLB Players strike forced the cancellation of the remainder of the season on August 12.

== Player stats ==
= Indicates team leader

=== Batting ===
==== Starters by position ====
Note: Pos = Position; G = Games played; AB = At bats; H = Hits; Avg. = Batting average; HR = Home runs; RBI = Runs batted in

Pos	Player	G	AB	H	Avg.	HR	RBI
C	Pat Borders	85	295	73	.247	3	26
1B	John Olerud	108	384	114	.297	12	67
2B	Roberto Alomar	107	392	120	.306	8	38
3B	Ed Sprague	109	405	97	.240	11	44
SS	Dick Schofield	95	325	83	.255	4	32
RF	Joe Carter	111	435	118	.271	27	103
CF	Devon White	100	403	109	.270	13	49
LF	Mike Huff	80	207	63	.304	3	25
DH	Paul Molitor	115	454	155	.341	14	75

==== Other batters ====
Note: G = Games played; AB = At bats; H = Hits; Avg. = Batting average; HR = Home runs; RBI = Runs batted in

Player	G	AB	H	Avg.	HR	RBI
Darnell Coles	48	143	30	.210	4	15
Carlos Delgado	43	130	28	.215	9	24
Randy Knorr	40	124	30	.242	7	19
Domingo Cedeño	47	97	19	.196	0	10
Rob Butler	41	74	13	.176	0	5
Alex Gonzalez	15	53	8	.151	0	1
Shawn Green	14	33	3	.091	0	1
Robert Pérez	4	8	1	.125	0	0

=== Pitching ===
==== Starting pitchers ====
Note: G = Games pitched; IP = Innings pitched; W = Wins; L = Losses; ERA = Earned run average; SO = Strikeouts

Player	G	IP	W	L	ERA	SO
Pat Hentgen	24	174.2	13	8	3.40	147
Juan Guzmán	25	147.1	12	11	5.68	124
Todd Stottlemyre	26	140.2	7	7	4.22	105
Dave Stewart	22	133.1	7	8	5.87	111
Al Leiter	20	111.2	6	7	5.08	100

==== Other pitchers ====
Note: G = Games pitched; IP = Innings pitched; W = Wins; L = Losses; ERA = Earned run average; SO = Strikeouts

Player	G	IP	W	L	ERA	SO
Brad Cornett	9	31.0	1	3	6.68	22
Paul Spoljaric	2	2.1	0	1	38.57	2

==== Relief pitchers ====
Note: G = Games pitched; W = Wins; L = Losses; SV = Saves; ERA = Earned run average; SO = Strikeouts

Player	G	W	L	SV	ERA	SO
Darren Hall	30	2	3	17	3.41	28
Tony Castillo	41	5	2	1	2.51	43
Woody Williams	38	1	3	0	3.64	56
Mike Timlin	34	0	1	2	5.18	38
Greg Cadaret	21	0	1	0	5.85	15
Scott Brow	18	0	3	2	5.90	15
Dave Righetti	13	0	1	0	6.75	10
Danny Cox	10	1	1	3	1.45	14
Randy St. Claire	2	0	0	0	9.00	2
Aaron Small	1	0	0	0	9.00	0

== Awards and honours ==
- Joe Carter, Player of the Month Award, April
- Devon White, Gold Glove Award
- Roberto Alomar, Gold Glove Award

All-Star Game

- Roberto Alomar, 2B, starter
- Joe Carter, OF, starter
- Pat Hentgen, P, reserve
- Paul Molitor, DH, reserve
- Cito Gaston, manager

== Farm system ==
Level	Team	League	Manager
AAA	Syracuse Chiefs	International League	Bob Didier
AA	Knoxville Smokies	Southern League	Garth Iorg
A	Dunedin Blue Jays	Florida State League	Jim Nettles
A	Hagerstown Suns	South Atlantic League	Omar Malavé
A-Short Season	St. Catharines Blue Jays	New York–Penn League	J. J. Cannon
Rookie	GCL Blue Jays	Gulf Coast League	Doug Ault
Rookie	Medicine Hat Blue Jays	Pioneer League	Darren Balsley
