= 1994 Minnesota Twins season =

1994 Minnesota Twins
- League: American League
- Division: Central
- Ballpark: Hubert H. Humphrey Metrodome
- City: Minneapolis
- Record: 53-60 (.496)
- Divisional place: 4th
- Owners: Carl Pohlad
- General managers: Andy MacPhail
- Managers: Tom Kelly
- Television: WCCO-TV; Midwest Sports Channel (Al Newman, Dick Bremer, Chad Hartman, Tommy John )
- Radio: 830 WCCO AM (Herb Carneal, John Gordon, Jim Powell)

The 1994 Minnesota Twins season was the 34th season for the Minnesota Twins franchise in the Twin Cities of Minnesota, their 13th season at Hubert H. Humphrey Metrodome and the 94th overall in the American League.

The strike overshadowed the season's accomplishments. These included Scott Erickson's no-hitter on April 27, Chuck Knoblauch's 85-game errorless streak and league-leading 45 doubles, Kirby Puckett's 2,000th hit, and Kent Hrbek's retirement. In 113 games, Manager Tom Kelly's team finished with a record of 53–60, for fourth place in the newly created American League Central.

== Offseason ==
- November 24, 1993: Willie Banks was traded by the Twins to the Chicago Cubs for Dave Stevens and Matt Walbeck.
- February 16, 1994: Alex Cole was signed as a free agent by the Twins.
- February 21, 1994: The Twins traded a player to be named later to the Cleveland Indians for minor leaguer Shawn Bryant. The Twins completed the deal by sending Enrique Wilson to the Indians on March 24.

== Regular season ==
On April 27 at home, Scott Erickson no-hit the Milwaukee Brewers—the Metrodome's first no-hitter—for a 6–0 win. His no-hitter was the third Twins' no-hitter, 27 years after Dean Chance no-hit the Cleveland Indians in 1967.

On May 20, the team put up 22 hits against the Boston Red Sox—putting up two club records that were set in the fifth inning, when eight consecutive players hit safely, and a total of ten hits were recorded in the half-inning. The Twins won 21–2.

The Twins' All-Star representatives were outfielder Kirby Puckett and second baseman Chuck Knoblauch.

By Friday, August 12, the Twins had compiled a 53–60 record through 113 games. They had scored 594 runs (5.26 per game) and allowed 688 runs (6.09 per game).

Throughout the strike-shortened season, the Twins' pitching staff struggled and finished with a 5.68 ERA: the highest in the majors. In 1,005.0 innings pitched, they gave up 1,197 hits and 634 earned runs: the most among all 28 teams. They did, however, issue the fewest intentional walks in the Majors, with 20.

Terry Ryan was named Twins General Manager, replacing Andy MacPhail, architect of the team's 1991 world champion team.

The highest paid Twin in 1994 was Puckett at $5,300,000, followed by Aguilera at $3,260,000.

=== Offense ===
Despite the short season, Kirby Puckett managed to belt 20 home runs and drive in 112 runs, winning his sixth Silver Slugger Award. Outfielder Shane Mack had a solid year in his last year with the Twins, batting .333. Knoblauch and outfielder Alex Cole lit up the base paths, stealing 35 and 29 bases, respectively. Designated hitter Dave Winfield had a mediocre year in his last season with his hometown team. (He would play in 46 games for the Cleveland Indians in 1995 before announcing his retirement.)

Team Leaders
Statistic	Player	Quantity
HR	Kirby Puckett	20
RBI	Kirby Puckett	112
BA	Shane Mack	.333
Runs	Chuck Knoblauch	85

=== Pitching ===
The starting rotation was not a strong one, although the starters at least started consistently every fifth day, unlike in subsequent years for the Twins. Jim Deshaies, Kevin Tapani, Scott Erickson, Pat Mahomes, and Carlos Pulido started all but six games for the team. Despite the no-hitter, Erickson's year was disappointing, as he posted a 5.44 ERA. Rick Aguilera continued to be a reliable closer while the only reliable arm out of the bullpen was Kevin Campbell with an ERA of 2.92.

Team Leaders
Statistic	Player	Quantity
ERA	Kevin Tapani	4.62
Wins	Kevin Tapani	11
Saves	Rick Aguilera	23
Strikeouts	Scott Erickson	104

=== Defense ===
Matt Walbeck and Derek Parks were a strong 1-2 punch at catcher, at least defensively. (Both had .993 fielding percentages.) Kent Hrbek ended his career with a solid one defensively with a .997 average. As mentioned, Knoblauch excelled defensively at this point in his career. Scott Leius and Pat Meares were defensively average on the left side of the infield. Puckett and Mack were strong in the outfield, while Alex Cole was average. Pedro Muñoz also saw substantial time in the outfield.

=== Season standings ===
AL Central
Team	W	L	Pct.	GB	Home	Road
Chicago White Sox	67	46	.593	—	34‍–‍19	33‍–‍27
Cleveland Indians	66	47	.584	1	35‍–‍16	31‍–‍31
Kansas City Royals	64	51	.557	4	35‍–‍24	29‍–‍27
Minnesota Twins	53	60	.469	14	32‍–‍27	21‍–‍33
Milwaukee Brewers	53	62	.461	15	24‍–‍32	29‍–‍30

Division leaders
Team	W	L	Pct.
New York Yankees	70	43	.619
Chicago White Sox	67	46	.593
Texas Rangers	52	62	.456

Wild Card team (Top team qualifies for postseason)
Team	W	L	Pct.	GB
Cleveland Indians	66	47	.584	—
Baltimore Orioles	63	49	.562	2½
Kansas City Royals	64	51	.557	3
Toronto Blue Jays	55	60	.478	12
Boston Red Sox	54	61	.470	13
Minnesota Twins	53	60	.469	13
Detroit Tigers	53	62	.461	14
Milwaukee Brewers	53	62	.461	14
Oakland Athletics	51	63	.447	15½
Seattle Mariners	49	63	.438	16½
California Angels	47	68	.409	20

=== Record vs. opponents ===
1994 American League record Source: MLB Standings Grid – 1994
Team	BAL	BOS	CAL	CWS	CLE	DET	KC	MIL	MIN	NYY	OAK	SEA	TEX	TOR
Baltimore	—	4–2	8–4	2–4	4–6	3–4	4–1	7–3	4–5	4–6	7–5	4–6	3–3	7–2
Boston	2–4	—	7–5	2–4	3–7	4–2	4–2	5–5	1–8	3–7	9–3	6–6	1–5	7–3
California	4–8	5–7	—	5–5	0–5	3–4	6–4	3–3	3–3	4–8	3–6	2–7	6–4	3–4
Chicago	4–2	4–2	5–5	—	7–5	8–4	3–7	9–3	2–4	4–2	6–3	9–1	4–5	2–3
Cleveland	6–4	7–3	5–0	5–7	—	8–2	1–4	5–2	9–3	0–9	6–0	3–2	5–7	6–4
Detroit	4–3	2–4	4–3	4–8	2–8	—	4–8	6–4	3–3	3–3	5–4	6–3	5–7	5–4
Kansas City	1–4	2–4	4–6	7–3	4–1	8–4	—	5–7	6–4	4–2	7–3	6–4	4–3	6–6
Milwaukee	3–7	5–5	3–3	3–9	2–5	4–6	7–5	—	6–6	2–7	4–1	4–2	3–3	7–3
Minnesota	5–4	8–1	3–3	4–2	3–9	3–3	4–6	6–6	—	4–5	2–5	3–3	4–5	4–8
New York	6–4	7–3	8–4	2–4	9–0	3–3	2–4	7–2	5–4	—	7–5	8–4	3–2	3–4
Oakland	5–7	3–9	6–3	3–6	0–6	4–5	3–7	1–4	5–2	5–7	—	4–3	7–3	5–1
Seattle	4–6	6–6	7–2	1–9	2–3	3–6	4–6	2–4	3–3	4–8	3–4	—	9–1	1–5
Texas	3–3	5–1	4–6	5–4	7–5	7–5	3–4	3–3	5–4	2–3	3–7	1–9	—	4–8
Toronto	2–7	3–7	4–3	3–2	4–6	4–5	6–6	3–7	8–4	4–3	1–5	5–1	8–4	—

=== Notable transactions ===
- March 14, 1994: Lenny Webster was traded by the Twins to the Montreal Expos as part of a conditional deal.
- June 2, 1994: 1994 Major League Baseball draft
  - Todd Walker was drafted by the Twins in the 1st round (8th pick).
  - Travis Miller was drafted by the Twins in the 1st round (34th pick).
  - Cleatus Davidson was drafted by the Twins in the 2nd round.
  - A. J. Pierzynski was drafted by the Twins in the 3rd round.
  - David Dellucci was drafted by the Twins in the 11th round, but did not sign.
  - Corey Koskie was drafted by the Twins in the 26th round.
- July 14, 1994: Larry Casian was claimed off waivers from the Twins by the Cleveland Indians.
- August 31: Dave Winfield was sold by the Twins to the Cleveland Indians.

=== Roster ===
1994 Minnesota Twins
Roster
Pitchers: 38 Rick Aguilera; 52 Kevin Campbell; 48 Larry Casian; 44 Jim Deshaies; 19 Scott Erickson; 54 Keith Garagozzo; 18 Eddie Guardado; 53 Mark Guthrie; 20 Pat Mahomes; 47 Brett Merriman; 22 Carlos Pulido; 58 Erik Schullstrom; 41 Dave Stevens; 36 Kevin Tapani; 21 Mike Trombley; 51 Carl Willis	Catchers: 16 Derek Parks; 23 Matt Walbeck; Infielders: 39 Steve Dunn; 4 Chip Hale; 7 Denny Hocking; 14 Kent Hrbek; 11 Chuck Knoblauch; 31 Scott Leius; 8 Dave McCarty; 2 Pat Meares; 17 Jeff Reboulet	Outfielders: 25 Rich Becker; 1 Alex Cole; 24 Shane Mack; 5 Pedro Muñoz; 34 Kirby Puckett; 32 Dave Winfield	Manager: 10 Tom Kelly; Coaches: 46 Terry Crowley (hitting); 35 Ron Gardenhire (third base); 43 Rick Stelmaszek (bullpen); 42 Dick Such (pitching); 45 Wayne Terwilliger (first base)

== Player stats ==
=== Batting ===
==== Starters by position ====
Note: Pos = Position; G = Games played; AB = At bats; H = Hits; Avg. = Batting average; HR = Home runs; RBI = Runs batted in

Pos	Player	G	AB	H	Avg.	HR	RBI
C	Matt Walbeck	97	338	69	.204	5	35
1B	Kent Hrbek	81	274	74	.270	10	53
2B	Chuck Knoblauch	109	445	139	.312	5	51
SS	Pat Meares	80	229	61	.266	2	24
3B	Scott Leius	97	350	86	.246	14	49
LF	Shane Mack	81	303	101	.333	15	61
CF	Alex Cole	105	345	102	.296	4	23
RF	Kirby Puckett	108	439	139	.317	20	112
DH	Dave Winfield	77	294	74	.252	10	43

==== Other batters ====
Note: G = Games played; AB = At bats; H = Hits; Avg. = Batting average; HR = Home runs; RBI = Runs batted in

Player	G	AB	H	Avg.	HR	RBI
Pedro Muñoz	75	244	72	.295	11	36
Jeff Reboulet	74	189	49	.259	3	23
Dave McCarty	44	131	34	.260	1	12
Chip Hale	67	118	31	.263	1	11
Rich Becker	28	98	26	.265	1	8
Derek Parks	31	89	17	.191	1	9
Steve Dunn	14	35	8	.229	0	4
Denny Hocking	11	31	10	.323	0	2

=== Pitching ===
==== Starting pitchers ====
Note: G = Games pitched; IP = Innings pitched; W = Wins; L = Losses; ERA = Earned run average; SO = Strikeouts

Player	G	IP	W	L	ERA	SO
Kevin Tapani	24	156.0	11	7	4.62	91
Scott Erickson	23	144.0	8	11	5.44	104
Jim Deshaies	25	130.1	6	12	7.39	78
Pat Mahomes	21	120.0	9	5	4.73	53
Eddie Guardado	4	17.0	0	2	8.47	8

==== Other pitchers ====
Note: G = Games pitched; IP = Innings pitched; W = Wins; L = Losses; ERA = Earned run average; SO = Strikeouts

Player	G	IP	W	L	ERA	SO
Carlos Pulido	19	84.1	3	7	5.98	32

==== Relief pitchers ====
Note: G = Games pitched; W = Wins; L = Losses; SV = Saves; ERA = Earned run average; SO = Strikeouts

Player	G	W	L	SV	ERA	SO
Rick Aguilera	44	1	4	23	3.63	46
Mark Guthrie	50	4	2	1	6.14	38
Carl Willis	49	2	4	3	5.92	37
Larry Casian	33	1	3	1	7.08	18
Mike Trombley	24	2	0	0	6.33	32
Dave Stevens	24	5	2	0	6.80	24
Brett Merriman	15	0	1	0	6.35	10
Kevin Campbell	14	1	0	0	2.92	15
Erik Schullstrom	9	0	0	1	2.77	13
Keith Garagozzo	7	0	0	0	9.64	3

== Other post-season awards ==
- Calvin R. Griffith Award (Most Valuable Twin) – Kirby Puckett
- Joseph W. Haynes Award (Twins Pitcher of the Year) – Kevin Tapani
- Bill Boni Award (Twins Outstanding Rookie) – Matt Walbeck
- Charles O. Johnson Award (Most Improved Twin) – Chuck Knoblauch
- Dick Siebert Award (Upper Midwest Player of the Year) – Paul Molitor
  - The above awards are voted on by the Twin Cities chapter of the BBWAA
- Carl R. Pohlad Award (Outstanding Community Service) – Kent Hrbek
- Sherry Robertson Award (Twins Outstanding Farm System Player) – LaTroy Hawkins

Designated hitter Dave Winfield won the Roberto Clemente Award, given annually to the Major League Baseball (MLB) player who "best exemplifies the game of baseball, sportsmanship, community involvement and the individual's contribution to his team", as voted on by baseball fans and members of the media. Rod Carew in 1977 is the only Twin to have won this award in the past. Kirby Puckett will win it in 1996.

== Farm system ==
Level	Team	League	Manager
AAA	Salt Lake Buzz	Pacific Coast League	Scott Ullger
AA	Nashville Xpress	Southern League	Phil Roof
A	Fort Myers Miracle	Florida State League	Steve Liddle
A	Fort Wayne Wizards	Midwest League	Jim Dwyer
Rookie	Elizabethton Twins	Appalachian League	Ray Smith
Rookie	GCL Twins	Gulf Coast League	Jose Marzan
