= List of Nippon Professional Baseball players (B) =

The following is a list of Nippon Professional Baseball players with the last name starting with B, retired or active.

== B ==
- Shohei Baba
- Toshifumi Baba
- Gene Bacque
- Cory Bailey
- Aarom Baldiris
- John Bale
- Jeff Ball
- Willie Banks
- Larry Barnes
- Jeff Barry
- Adam Bass
- Tony Batista
- Howard Battle
- Jim Baumer
- Kevin Beirne
- Rigo Beltrán
- Sean Bergman
- Takehiko Bessho
- Rafael Betancourt
- Kaoru Betto
- Todd Betts
- Jason Beverlin
- Larry Bigbie
- Mike Birkbeck
- Don Blasingame
- Greg Blosser
- Mike Blowers
- Hiram Bocachica
- Kenmei Boku
- Frank Bolick
- Rodney Bolton
- Koji Bonishi
- James Bonnici
- Jason Botts
- Cedrick Bowers
- Shane Bowers
- Clete Boyer
- Glenn Braggs
- Craig Brazell
- Brent Brede
- Bernardo Brito
- Mario Brito
- Perez Brito
- Chris Brock
- Jerry Brooks
- Terry Bross
- Jamie Brown
- Marty Brown
- Roosevelt Brown
- Cliff Brumbaugh
- Ralph Bryant
- Brian Buchanan
- Scott Bullett
- Melvin Bunch
- Morgan Burkhart
- Adrian Burnside
- Terry Burrows
