= 1994 Cleveland Indians season =

1994 Cleveland Indians
- League: American League
- Division: Central
- Ballpark: Jacobs Field
- City: Cleveland, Ohio
- Record: 66–47 (.584)
- Divisional place: 2nd
- Owners: Richard Jacobs
- General managers: John Hart
- Managers: Mike Hargrove
- Television: WUAB; Jack Corrigan, Mike Hegan; SportsChannel; John Sanders, Rick Manning
- Radio: WKNR (1220 AM); Herb Score, Tom Hamilton, Matt Underwood

The 1994 Cleveland Indians season was the 94th season for the franchise. For the first time since 1986, the Indians finished the season with a winning record. However, the 1994 season ended prematurely due to the 1994–95 Major League Baseball strike that ended the season on August 12. It was the first season for the Indians playing at Jacobs Field after playing at Cleveland Stadium since 1946.

== Offseason ==
- November 2, 1993: Heathcliff Slocumb was traded by the Indians to the Philadelphia Phillies for Rubén Amaro Jr.
- December 2, 1993: Dennis Martínez was signed as a free agent by the Indians.
- December 13, 1993: Randy Milligan was traded by the Indians to the Montreal Expos for a player to be named later. The Expos completed the deal by sending Brian Barnes to the Indians on December 17.
- December 13, 1993: Sam Horn was released by the Indians.
- December 20, 1993: Félix Fermín was traded by the Cleveland Indians with Reggie Jefferson and cash to the Seattle Mariners for Omar Vizquel.
- February 10, 1994: Jack Morris was signed as a free agent by the Indians.
- March 30, 1994: Pete Rose Jr. was released by the Indians.

== Regular season ==
Larry Doby
CF, Coach
Retired 1994

- On July 3, 1994, Larry Doby had his number retired by the team. Doby had played for Cleveland for ten seasons (1947–1955, 1958). He was the first African American to play in the American League, playing his first game in Major League Baseball on July 5, 1947, becoming the second African American player to play in MLB. A .287 hitter, Doby was an All-Star in two combined leagues (Negro League and American League) on seven occasions while winning a World Series in both leagues. Doby would later be inducted in the National Baseball Hall of Fame and Museum in 1998.
- On July 15, 1994, Albert Belle's bat was confiscated by umpire Dave Phillips. It was the result of White Sox manager Gene Lamont believing that the bat was corked. During the game, Indians pitcher Jason Grimsley removed a ceiling tile in his manager's office and clambered on top of an 18-inch-wide (460 mm) cinder block. He replaced the corked bat with a conventional bat but the bat had Paul Sorrento's name on it. Belle was suspended for seven games.

By Friday August 12, 1994, the Indians had compiled a 66–47 record through 113 games, just one game back of the Chicago White Sox for the AL Central Division lead. They had scored 679 runs (6.01 per game) and allowed 562 runs (4.97 per game). They were leading the AL Wildcard Race over the Baltimore Orioles by 2.5 games. Cleveland was leading the Majors in nearly every offensive category, including hits (1,165), runs scored (679), home runs (167), runs batted in (647), batting average (.290), slugging percentage (.484) and total bases (1,946).

Cleveland pitching was also strong, as Indians pitchers had combined for an MLB-high 17 complete games pitched before the players' strike prematurely ended the season.

=== Season standings ===
AL Central
Team	W	L	Pct.	GB	Home	Road
Chicago White Sox	67	46	.593	—	34‍–‍19	33‍–‍27
Cleveland Indians	66	47	.584	1	35‍–‍16	31‍–‍31
Kansas City Royals	64	51	.557	4	35‍–‍24	29‍–‍27
Minnesota Twins	53	60	.469	14	32‍–‍27	21‍–‍33
Milwaukee Brewers	53	62	.461	15	24‍–‍32	29‍–‍30

Division leaders
Team	W	L	Pct.
New York Yankees	70	43	.619
Chicago White Sox	67	46	.593
Texas Rangers	52	62	.456

Wild Card team (Top team qualifies for postseason)
Team	W	L	Pct.	GB
Cleveland Indians	66	47	.584	—
Baltimore Orioles	63	49	.562	2½
Kansas City Royals	64	51	.557	3
Toronto Blue Jays	55	60	.478	12
Boston Red Sox	54	61	.470	13
Minnesota Twins	53	60	.469	13
Detroit Tigers	53	62	.461	14
Milwaukee Brewers	53	62	.461	14
Oakland Athletics	51	63	.447	15½
Seattle Mariners	49	63	.438	16½
California Angels	47	68	.409	20

=== Record vs. opponents ===
1994 American League record Source: MLB Standings Grid – 1994
Team	BAL	BOS	CAL	CWS	CLE	DET	KC	MIL	MIN	NYY	OAK	SEA	TEX	TOR
Baltimore	—	4–2	8–4	2–4	4–6	3–4	4–1	7–3	4–5	4–6	7–5	4–6	3–3	7–2
Boston	2–4	—	7–5	2–4	3–7	4–2	4–2	5–5	1–8	3–7	9–3	6–6	1–5	7–3
California	4–8	5–7	—	5–5	0–5	3–4	6–4	3–3	3–3	4–8	3–6	2–7	6–4	3–4
Chicago	4–2	4–2	5–5	—	7–5	8–4	3–7	9–3	2–4	4–2	6–3	9–1	4–5	2–3
Cleveland	6–4	7–3	5–0	5–7	—	8–2	1–4	5–2	9–3	0–9	6–0	3–2	5–7	6–4
Detroit	4–3	2–4	4–3	4–8	2–8	—	4–8	6–4	3–3	3–3	5–4	6–3	5–7	5–4
Kansas City	1–4	2–4	4–6	7–3	4–1	8–4	—	5–7	6–4	4–2	7–3	6–4	4–3	6–6
Milwaukee	3–7	5–5	3–3	3–9	2–5	4–6	7–5	—	6–6	2–7	4–1	4–2	3–3	7–3
Minnesota	5–4	8–1	3–3	4–2	3–9	3–3	4–6	6–6	—	4–5	2–5	3–3	4–5	4–8
New York	6–4	7–3	8–4	2–4	9–0	3–3	2–4	7–2	5–4	—	7–5	8–4	3–2	3–4
Oakland	5–7	3–9	6–3	3–6	0–6	4–5	3–7	1–4	5–2	5–7	—	4–3	7–3	5–1
Seattle	4–6	6–6	7–2	1–9	2–3	3–6	4–6	2–4	3–3	4–8	3–4	—	9–1	1–5
Texas	3–3	5–1	4–6	5–4	7–5	7–5	3–4	3–3	5–4	2–3	3–7	1–9	—	4–8
Toronto	2–7	3–7	4–3	3–2	4–6	4–5	6–6	3–7	8–4	4–3	1–5	5–1	8–4	—

=== Transactions ===
- April 3, 1994: Jeremy Hernandez was traded by the Indians to the Florida Marlins for Matt Turner.
- June 2, 1994: 1994 Major League Baseball draft
  - Jaret Wright was drafted by the Indians in the 1st round (10th pick). Player signed July 21, 1994.
  - Russell Branyan was drafted by the Indians in the 7th round. Player signed June 9, 1994.
  - Bruce Aven was drafted by the Indians in the 30th round of the 1994 amateur draft. Player signed June 4, 1994.
- July 26, 1994: Marco Scutaro was signed as an amateur free agent by the Cleveland Indians.
- August 9, 1994: Jack Morris was released by the Indians.
- August 31, 1994: Dave Winfield was purchased by the Indians from the Minnesota Twins.

=== Opening Day Lineup ===
Opening Day Starters
#	Name	Position
7	Kenny Lofton	CF
13	Omar Vizquel	SS
9	Carlos Baerga	2B
8	Albert Belle	LF
33	Eddie Murray	1B
22	Candy Maldonado	DH
15	Sandy Alomar Jr.	C
24	Manny Ramirez	RF
20	Mark Lewis	3B
32	Dennis Martínez	P

=== Roster ===
1994 Cleveland Indians
Roster
Pitchers: 52 Brian Barnes; 51 Larry Casian; 54 Mark Clark; 45 Jerry DiPoto; 26 Steve Farr; 48 Jason Grimsley; 28 Derek Lilliquist; 59 Albie Lopez; 32 Dennis Martínez; 49 José Mesa; 47 Jack Morris; 43 Chris Nabholz; 41 Charles Nagy; 37 Chad Ogea; 38 Eric Plunk; 29 Jeff Russell; 53 Paul Shuey; 44 Russ Swan; 50 Julián Tavárez; 34 Matt Turner; 46 Bill Wertz	Catchers: 15 Sandy Alomar Jr.; 2 Matt Merullo; 17 Tony Peña; Infielders: 9 Carlos Baerga; 10 Álvaro Espinoza; 88 Rene Gonzales; 20 Mark Lewis; 33 Eddie Murray; 36 Herbert Perry; 11 Paul Sorrento; 25 Jim Thome; 13 Omar Vizquel	Outfielders: 30 Rubén Amaro Jr.; 8 Albert Belle; 35 Wayne Kirby; 7 Kenny Lofton; 22 Candy Maldonado; 24 Manny Ramirez; Other batters: 12 Jesse Levis	Manager: 21 Mike Hargrove; Coaches: 26 Buddy Bell (Infield); 6 Luis Isaac (Bullpen); 42 Charlie Manuel (Hitting); 14 Dave Nelson (First base); 55 Jeff Newman (Third base); 27 Phil Regan (Pitching)

== Jacobs Field ==
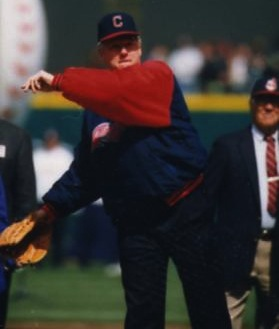
President Bill Clinton threw out the ceremonial first pitch on April 4, 1994, before the first Major League game played at Jacobs Field.

In May 1990, Cuyahoga County voters approved a 15-year sin tax on alcohol and cigarette sales in order to finance the new sports complex. In June 1992, the ceremonial first pitch was thrown at the site of the new Jacobs Field before construction of the building began.

In 1994, the ballpark opened under the name Jacobs Field as the new home of the Cleveland Indians, which had previously shared Cleveland Municipal Stadium with the NFL's Cleveland Browns. On April 4, 1994, the Indians played their first game at the new stadium. President Bill Clinton threw out the ceremonial first pitch, and the Indians defeated the Seattle Mariners 4–3 in 11 innings.

=== Highlights ===
Statistic	Person(s)	Date
First Ceremonial First Pitch	President Clinton to Sandy Alomar Jr.	April 4, 1994
First Hit	Eric Anthony (Seattle Mariners), home run	April 4, 1994
First Indians Hit	Sandy Alomar Jr., single to right field	April 4, 1994
First Double	Manny Ramírez	April 4, 1994
First Triple	Ken Griffey Jr. (Seattle Mariners)	April 7, 1994
First Home Run	Eric Anthony (Seattle Mariners)	April 4, 1994
First Indians Home Run	Eddie Murray	April 7, 1994
First Indians Run	Candy Maldonado, scored on Manny Ramírez 2-run double in the 8th inning	April 4, 1994
First Winning Pitcher	Eric Plunk	April 4, 1994
First Save	Hipólito Pichardo (Kansas City Royals)	April 15, 1994

== Game log ==
=== Regular season ===
1994 regular season game log: 66–47 (Home: 35–16; Away: 31–31)
April: 13–9 (Home: 5–6; Away: 8–3)

#	Date	Time (ET)	Opponent	Score	Win	Loss	Save	Time of Game	Attendance	Record	Box/ Streak

May: 13–12 (Home: 10–1; Away: 3–11)

#	Date	Time (ET)	Opponent	Score	Win	Loss	Save	Time of Game	Attendance	Record	Box/ Streak
28	May 9		@ Yankees	3–4						14–14	
29	May 10		@ Yankees	3–5						14–15	
30	May 11		@ Yankees	3–6						14–16	
31	May 12		@ Yankees	6–7 (10)						14–17	

June: 18–9 (Home: 10–3; Away: 8–6)

#	Date	Time (ET)	Opponent	Score	Win	Loss	Save	Time of Game	Attendance	Record	Box/ Streak
69	June 24		Yankees	6–11						42–27	
—	June 25		Yankees	**Postponed (Rain)**							
70	June 26		Yankees	11–12						42–28	

July: 15–13 (Home: 7–4; Away: 8–9)

#	Date	Time (ET)	Opponent	Score	Win	Loss	Save	Time of Game	Attendance	Record	Box/ Streak
ASG	July 12	8:00 p.m. EDT	65th All-Star Game in Pittsburgh, PA	8 – 7 AL (10)	—	—	—	3:14	59,568	—	ASG
100	July 29		@ Yankees	2–5						59–41	
101	July 30		@ Yankees	5–6						59–42	
102	July 31		@ Yankees	1–4						59–43	

August: 7–4 (Home: 3–1; Away: 4–3)

#	Date	Time (ET)	Opponent	Score	Win	Loss	Save	Time of Game	Attendance	Record	Box/ Streak

September: 0–0 (Home: 0–0; Away: 0–0)

#	Date	Time (ET)	Opponent	Score	Win	Loss	Save	Time of Game	Attendance	Record	Box/ Streak
—	September 26		Yankees	**Canceled (Strike)**							
—	September 27		Yankees	**Canceled (Strike)**							
—	September 28		Yankees	**Canceled (Strike)**							

October: 0–0 (Home: 0–0; Away: 0–0)

#	Date	Time (ET)	Opponent	Score	Win	Loss	Save	Time of Game	Attendance	Record	Box/ Streak

Legend: = Win = Loss = Postponement
Bold = Indians team member

=== Detailed records ===
**American League**
Opponent	Home	Away	Total	Pct.	Runs scored	Runs allowed
**AL East**
New York Yankees	0–2	0–7	0–9	.000	40	60
**Division Total**	**0–2**	**0–7**	**0–9**	**.000**	**40**	**60**
**AL Central**
**Cleveland Indians**	—	—	—	—	—	—
**Division Total**	**0–0**	**0–0**	**0–0**	–	**0**	**0**
**AL West**
**Division Total**	**0–0**	**0–0**	**0–0**	–	**0**	**0**
**Season Total**	**0–2**	**0–7**	**0–9**	**.000**	**40**	**60**

== Player stats ==
= Indicates team leader

= Indicates league leader

=== Batting ===
Note: G = Games played; AB = At bats; R = Runs scored; H = Hits; 2B = Doubles; 3B = Triples; HR = Home runs; RBI = Runs batted in; AVG = Batting average; SB = Stolen bases

Player	G	AB	R	H	2B	3B	HR	RBI	AVG	SB
Sandy Alomar Jr.	80	292	44	84	15	1	14	43	.288	8
Ruben Amaro Jr.	26	23	5	5	1	0	2	5	.217	2
Carlos Baerga	103	442	81	139	32	2	19	80	.314	8
Albert Belle	106	412	90	147	35	2	36	101	.357	9
Alvaro Espinoza	90	231	27	55	13	0	1	19	.238	1
Rene Gonzales	22	23	6	8	1	1	1	5	.348	2
Wayne Kirby	78	191	33	56	6	0	5	23	.293	11
Jesse Levis	1	1	0	1	0	0	0	0	1.000	0
Mark Lewis	20	73	6	15	5	0	1	8	.205	1
Kenny Lofton	112	459	105	160	32	9	12	57	.349	60
Candy Maldonado	42	92	14	18	5	1	5	12	.196	1
Matt Merullo	4	10	1	1	0	0	0	0	.100	0
Eddie Murray	108	433	57	110	21	1	17	76	.254	8
Tony Peña	40	112	18	33	8	1	2	10	.295	0
Herbert Perry	4	9	1	1	0	0	0	1	.111	0
Manny Ramirez	91	290	51	78	22	0	17	60	.269	4
Paul Sorrento	95	322	43	90	14	0	14	62	.280	0
Jim Thome	98	321	58	86	20	1	20	52	.268	3
Omar Vizquel	69	286	39	78	10	1	1	33	.273	13
Team totals	113	4022	679	1165	240	20	167	647	.290	131

=== Pitching ===
Note: W = Wins; L = Losses; ERA = Earned run average; G = Games pitched; GS = Games started; SV = Saves; IP = Innings pitched; H = Hits allowed; R = Runs allowed; ER = Earned runs allowed; BB = Walks allowed; K = Strikeouts

Player	W	L	ERA	G	GS	SV	IP	H	R	ER	BB	K
Brian Barnes	0	1	5.40	6	0	0	13.1	12	10	8	15	5
Larry Casian	0	2	8.64	7	0	0	8.1	16	9	8	4	2
Mark Clark	11	3	3.82	20	20	0	127.1	133	61	54	40	60
Jerry DiPoto	0	0	8.04	7	0	0	15.2	26	14	14	10	9
Steve Farr	1	1	5.28	19	0	4	15.1	17	12	9	15	12
Jason Grimsley	5	2	4.57	14	13	0	82.2	91	47	42	34	59
Derek Lilliquist	1	3	4.91	36	0	1	29.1	34	17	16	8	15
Albie Lopez	1	2	4.24	4	4	0	17.0	20	11	8	6	18
Dennis Martínez	11	6	3.52	24	24	0	176.2	166	75	69	44	92
José Mesa	7	5	3.82	51	0	2	73.0	71	33	31	26	63
Jack Morris	10	6	5.60	23	23	0	141.1	163	96	88	67	100
Chris Nabholz	0	1	11.45	6	4	0	11.0	23	16	14	9	5
Charles Nagy	10	8	3.45	23	23	0	169.1	175	76	65	48	108
Chad Ogea	0	1	6.06	4	1	0	16.1	21	11	11	10	11
Eric Plunk	7	2	2.54	41	0	3	71.0	61	25	20	37	73
Jeff Russell	1	1	4.97	13	0	5	12.2	13	8	7	3	10
Paul Shuey	0	1	8.49	14	0	5	11.2	14	11	11	12	16
Russ Swan	0	1	11.25	12	0	0	8.0	13	11	10	7	2
Julián Tavárez	0	1	21.60	1	1	0	1.2	6	8	4	1	0
Matt Turner	1	0	2.13	9	0	1	12.2	13	6	3	7	5
Bill Wertz	0	0	10.38	1	0	0	4.1	9	5	5	1	1
Team totals	66	47	4.36	113	113	21	1018.2	1097	562	494	404	666

== Awards and honors ==
All-Star Game

== Minor league affiliates ==
Level	Team	League	Season article
AAA	Charlotte Knights	International League	1994 Charlotte Knights season
AA	Canton–Akron Indians	Eastern League	1994 Canton–Akron Indians season
Advanced A	Kinston Indians	Carolina League	
A	Columbus RedStixx	South Atlantic League	
Short Season A	Watertown Indians	New York–Penn League	
Rookie	Burlington Indians	Appalachian League	
