= 1994 New York Yankees season =

Season for the Major League Baseball team the New York Yankees

1994 New York Yankees
- League: American League
- Division: East
- Ballpark: Yankee Stadium
- City: New York City
- Record: 70–43 (.619)
- Divisional place: 1st
- Owners: George Steinbrenner
- General managers: Gene Michael
- Managers: Buck Showalter
- Television: WPIX (Phil Rizzuto, Bobby Murcer, Paul Olden, Suzyn Waldman); MSG Network (Dewayne Staats, Tony Kubek, Al Trautwig)
- Radio: WABC (AM) (Michael Kay, John Sterling)

The 1994 New York Yankees season was the 92nd season for the Yankees. New York was managed by Buck Showalter and played at Yankee Stadium. The season was cut short by the 1994 player's strike, which wiped out any postseason aspirations for their first postseason appearance since losing the 1981 World Series and any postseason aspirations that their star player and captain, Don Mattingly, had for the first time in his career. On the day the strike began, the team had a record of 70–43, 6 1/2 games ahead of the Baltimore Orioles, the best record in the American League and the second-best record in Major League Baseball. The Yankees were on pace to win at least 100 games for the first time since 1980. The Yankees' ace, 33-year-old veteran Jimmy Key, was leading the majors with 17 wins and was on pace to win 24 games. Right fielder Paul O'Neill was also having a career year, as he was leading the league with a .359 batting average.

The strike is remembered bitterly by Yankees fans as it shook sports fans in New York City and the Yankees to the core, and has been named among the 10 worst moments in New York City sports history, primarily because Mattingly had not played in a postseason. It was also seen as the frustrating peak of the Yankees' downfall of the 1980s and early 1990s.

Many fans said that the strike and the lost Yankees season was another blow to baseball backers in New York City, following the move of the Dodgers and the Giants to California for the 1958 season, the demise of the Yankees during the 1960s and early 1970s, and the bad baseball at Shea Stadium during the late 1970s and early 1990s. The strike ruined the chance for the Yankees to follow in the footsteps of their 1994 New York counterparts, the NHL Stanley Cup Champion Rangers and NBA Eastern Conference Champion Knicks, by making the championship round of their respective sport.

Because the Yankees' last postseason appearance had been in a season cut short by a strike, the media often remarked on the parallels between the two Yankee teams (1981 and 1994), which included both teams having division leads taken away by strike. Throughout October, they continued to bombard the Yankees, making speculations about what might have been if there had not been a strike.

== Offseason ==
- November 27, 1993: Andy Stankiewicz and Domingo Jean were traded by the Yankees to the Houston Astros for Xavier Hernandez.
- December 9, 1993: Spike Owen was traded by the Yankees with cash to the California Angels for Jose Musset (minors).
- December 20, 1993: Luis Polonia was signed as a free agent by the Yankees.
- December 22, 1993: Sam Horn was signed as a free agent by the Yankees.
- January 28, 1994: Bob Ojeda signed as a free agent by the Yankees.
- February 9, 1994: Bobby Muñoz, Ryan Karp, and Kevin Jordan were traded by the Yankees to the Philadelphia Phillies for Terry Mulholland and a player to be named later. The Phillies completed the deal by sending Jeff Patterson to the New York Yankees on November 8.
- February 15, 1994: Jeff Reardon was signed as a free agent by the Yankees.

== Regular season ==
By Friday, August 12, the Yankees had compiled a 70–43 record through 113 games. They were leading the AL East Division and had scored 670 runs (5.93 per game) and allowed 534 runs (4.73 per game). Yankees hitters were walked 530 times in the strike-shortened season: the most in the Majors. They also led the Majors in on-base percentage, with .374. They did, however, tie the San Diego Padres for the most double plays grounded into, with 112.

The World Series, for which the Yankees appeared to be destined, was never played and contributed to fallouts both on and off the field. On the field, Don Mattingly retired after the 1995 season, and never got a chance to play in the World Series.. Off the field, the Yankees broadcast team on MSG Network left due to the strike; play-by-play announcer Dewayne Staats didn't have his contract renewed and analyst Tony Kubek, himself a former Yankee, retired from broadcasting. Kubek cited "I hate what the game's become—the greed, the nastiness." He hasn't seen or broadcast a baseball game since.

The 1994 New York Yankees team that could have been remains a hot discussion point in both baseball and in New York City because of the team's revival and Mattingly had not played in a postseason. When reacting to the strike's cancellation of the season, the first words many people on the Yankees, including Owner George Steinbrenner, Michael, and Showalter all said was that they all felt bad for Mattingly, saying that he deserved a postseason. Mattingly led active players in both games played and at bats without ever appearing in the postseason.

=== Game log ===
1994 Regular Season Game Log (70-43) (Home: 33-24; Road: 37-19)
April (15-8) (Home: 9-4; Road: 6-4)

#	Date	Opponent	Score	Win	Loss	Save	Attendance	Record	Report
1	April 4	Rangers							
2	April 7	Rangers							
3	April 8	Tigers							
4	April 9	Tigers							
5	April 10	Tigers							
6	April 12	@ White Sox							
7	April 13	@ White Sox							
8	April 14	@ White Sox							
9	April 15	@ Tigers							
10	April 16	@ Tigers							
11	April 17	@ Tigers							
12	April 19	Mariners							
13	April 20	Mariners							
14	April 21	Mariners							
15	April 22	Athletics							
16	April 23	Athletics							
17	April 24	Athletics							
18	April 25	Angels							
19	April 26	Angels							
20	April 27	@ Mariners							
21	April 28	@ Mariners							
22	April 29	@ Athletics							
23	April 30	@ Athletics							

May (18-7) (Home: 12-2; Road: 6-5)

#	Date	Opponent	Score	Win	Loss	Save	Attendance	Record	Report
24	May 1	@ Athletics							
25	May 3	@ Angels							
26	May 4	@ Angels							
27	May 6	Red Sox							
28	May 7	Red Sox							
29	May 8	Red Sox							
30	May 9	Indians							
31	May 10	Indians							
32	May 11	Indians							
33	May 12	Indians							
34	May 13	@ Brewers							
35	May 14	@ Brewers							
36	May 15	@ Brewers							
37	May 17	@ Twins							
38	May 18	@ Twins							
39	May 20	Orioles							
40	May 21	Orioles							
41	May 22	Orioles							
42	May 24	Blue Jays							
43	May 25	Blue Jays							
44	May 27	@ Royals							
45	May 28	@ Royals							
46	May 29	@ Royals							
47	May 30	White Sox							
48	May 31	White Sox							

June (14-13) (Home: 4-6; Road: 10-7)

#	Date	Opponent	Score	Win	Loss	Save	Attendance	Record	Report
49	June 1	White Sox							
50	June 3	Royals							
51	June 4	Royals							
52	June 5	Royals							
53	June 6	@ Rangers							
54	June 7	@ Rangers							
55	June 8	@ Rangers							
56	June 9	@ Blue Jays							
57	June 10	@ Blue Jays							
58	June 11	@ Blue Jays							
59	June 12	@ Blue Jays							
60	June 13	@ Orioles							
61	June 14	@ Orioles							
62	June 15	@ Orioles							
63	June 16	@ Orioles							
64	June 17	Brewers							
65	June 18	Brewers							
66	June 19	Brewers							
67	June 20	Twins							
68	June 21	Twins							
69	June 22	Twins							
70	June 24	@ Indians							
71	June 26	@ Indians							
72	June 27	@ Red Sox							
73	June 28	@ Red Sox							
74	June 29	@ Red Sox							
75	June 30	@ Red Sox							

July (17-10) (Home: 7-9; Road: 10-1)

#	Date	Opponent	Score	Win	Loss	Save	Attendance	Record	Report
76	July 1	Mariners							
77	July 2	Mariners							
78	July 3	Mariners							
79	July 4	Athletics							
80	July 5	Athletics							
81	July 6	Athletics							
82	July 7	Angels							
83	July 8	Angels							
84	July 9	Angels							
85	July 10	Angels							
All-Star Break: NL def. AL at Three Rivers Stadium, 8–7 (10)
86	July 14	@ Mariners							
87	July 15	@ Mariners							
88	July 16	@ Mariners							
89	July 17	@ Mariners							
90	July 18	@ Athletics							
91	July 19	@ Athletics							
92	July 20	@ Athletics							
93	July 21	@ Angels							
94	July 22	@ Angels							
95	July 23	@ Angels							
96	July 24	@ Angels							
97	July 26	Red Sox							
98	July 27	Red Sox							
99	July 28	Red Sox							
100	July 29	Indians							
101	July 30	Indians							
102	July 31	Indians							

August (6-5) (Home: 1-3; Road: 5-2)

#	Date	Opponent	Score	Win	Loss	Save	Attendance	Record	Report
103	August 1	@ Brewers							
104	August 2	@ Brewers							
105	August 3	@ Brewers							
106	August 4	@ Twins							
107	August 5	@ Twins							
108	August 6	@ Twins							
109	August 7	@ Twins							
110	August 8	Orioles							
111	August 9	Orioles							
112	August 10	Orioles							
113	August 11	Blue Jays							

Legend
Yankees win	Yankees loss	All-Star Game	Game postponed

=== Season standings ===
AL East
Team	W	L	Pct.	GB	Home	Road
New York Yankees	70	43	.619	—	33‍–‍24	37‍–‍19
Baltimore Orioles	63	49	.562	6½	28‍–‍27	35‍–‍22
Toronto Blue Jays	55	60	.478	16	33‍–‍26	22‍–‍34
Boston Red Sox	54	61	.470	17	31‍–‍33	23‍–‍28
Detroit Tigers	53	62	.461	18	34‍–‍24	19‍–‍38

Division leaders
Team	W	L	Pct.
New York Yankees	70	43	.619
Chicago White Sox	67	46	.593
Texas Rangers	52	62	.456

Wild Card team (Top team qualifies for postseason)
Team	W	L	Pct.	GB
Cleveland Indians	66	47	.584	—
Baltimore Orioles	63	49	.562	2½
Kansas City Royals	64	51	.557	3
Toronto Blue Jays	55	60	.478	12
Boston Red Sox	54	61	.470	13
Minnesota Twins	53	60	.469	13
Detroit Tigers	53	62	.461	14
Milwaukee Brewers	53	62	.461	14
Oakland Athletics	51	63	.447	15½
Seattle Mariners	49	63	.438	16½
California Angels	47	68	.409	20

=== Record vs. opponents ===
1994 American League record Source: MLB Standings Grid – 1994
Team	BAL	BOS	CAL	CWS	CLE	DET	KC	MIL	MIN	NYY	OAK	SEA	TEX	TOR
Baltimore	—	4–2	8–4	2–4	4–6	3–4	4–1	7–3	4–5	4–6	7–5	4–6	3–3	7–2
Boston	2–4	—	7–5	2–4	3–7	4–2	4–2	5–5	1–8	3–7	9–3	6–6	1–5	7–3
California	4–8	5–7	—	5–5	0–5	3–4	6–4	3–3	3–3	4–8	3–6	2–7	6–4	3–4
Chicago	4–2	4–2	5–5	—	7–5	8–4	3–7	9–3	2–4	4–2	6–3	9–1	4–5	2–3
Cleveland	6–4	7–3	5–0	5–7	—	8–2	1–4	5–2	9–3	0–9	6–0	3–2	5–7	6–4
Detroit	4–3	2–4	4–3	4–8	2–8	—	4–8	6–4	3–3	3–3	5–4	6–3	5–7	5–4
Kansas City	1–4	2–4	4–6	7–3	4–1	8–4	—	5–7	6–4	4–2	7–3	6–4	4–3	6–6
Milwaukee	3–7	5–5	3–3	3–9	2–5	4–6	7–5	—	6–6	2–7	4–1	4–2	3–3	7–3
Minnesota	5–4	8–1	3–3	4–2	3–9	3–3	4–6	6–6	—	4–5	2–5	3–3	4–5	4–8
New York	6–4	7–3	8–4	2–4	9–0	3–3	2–4	7–2	5–4	—	7–5	8–4	3–2	3–4
Oakland	5–7	3–9	6–3	3–6	0–6	4–5	3–7	1–4	5–2	5–7	—	4–3	7–3	5–1
Seattle	4–6	6–6	7–2	1–9	2–3	3–6	4–6	2–4	3–3	4–8	3–4	—	9–1	1–5
Texas	3–3	5–1	4–6	5–4	7–5	7–5	3–4	3–3	5–4	2–3	3–7	1–9	—	4–8
Toronto	2–7	3–7	4–3	3–2	4–6	4–5	6–6	3–7	8–4	4–3	1–5	5–1	8–4	—

=== Notable transactions ===
- March 21, 1994: Paul Assenmacher was traded by the Yankees to the Chicago White Sox for Brian Boehringer.
- March 29, 1994: Kevin Maas was released by the Yankees.
- May 1, 1994: Kevin Elster was signed as a free agent with the New York Yankees.
- May 5, 1994: Bob Ojeda was released by the New York Yankees.
- May 6, 1994: Jeff Reardon was released by the New York Yankees.
- June 23, 1994: Sam Horn was released by the New York Yankees.
- July 3, 1994: Greg A. Harris was signed as a free agent with the New York Yankees.
- July 13, 1994: Greg A. Harris was released by the New York Yankees.

=== Roster ===
1994 New York Yankees
Roster
Pitchers: 25 Jim Abbott; 54 Joe Ausanio; 35 Paul Gibson; 34 Greg Harris; 31 Xavier Hernandez; 41 Sterling Hitchcock; 57 Steve Howe; 52 Mark Hutton; 28 Scott Kamieniecki; 22 Jimmy Key; 46 Terry Mulholland; 34 Rob Murphy; 19 Bob Ojeda; 39 Donn Pall; 33 Mélido Pérez; 54 Jeff Reardon; 27 Bob Wickman	Catchers: 13 Jim Leyritz; 43 Bob Melvin; 38 Matt Nokes; 20 Mike Stanley; Infielders: 12 Wade Boggs; 24 Russ Davis; 50 Robert Eenhoorn; 19 Kevin Elster; 2 Mike Gallego; 14 Pat Kelly; 23 Don Mattingly; 47 Dave Silvestri; 18 Randy Velarde	Outfielders: 26 Daryl Boston; 21 Paul O'Neill; 17 Luis Polonia; 45 Danny Tartabull; 51 Bernie Williams; 29 Gerald Williams	Manager: 11 Buck Showalter; Coaches: 6 Clete Boyer; 55 Brian Butterfield (First Base); 40 Tony Cloninger; 36 Billy Connors; 48 Rick Down; 30 Willie Randolph (Third Base); 53 Glenn Sherlock (Bullpen Catcher)

== Player stats ==
= Indicates team leader

=== Batting ===
==== Starters by position ====
Note: Pos = Position; G = Games played; AB = At bats; H = Hits; Avg. = Batting average; HR = Home runs; RBI = Runs batted in

Pos	Player	G	AB	R	H	Avg.	HR	RBI
C	Mike Stanley	82	290	54	87	.300	17	57
1B	Don Mattingly	97	372	62	113	.304	6	51
2B	Pat Kelly	93	286	35	80	.280	3	41
SS	Mike Gallego	89	306	39	73	.239	6	41
3B	Wade Boggs	97	366	61	125	.342	11	55
LF	Luis Polonia	95	350	62	109	.311	1	36
CF	Bernie Williams	108	408	80	118	.289	12	57
RF	Paul O'Neill	103	368	68	132	.359	21	83
DH	Danny Tartabull	104	399	68	102	.256	19	67

==== Other batters ====
Note: G = Games played; AB = At bats; R = Runs; H = Hits; Avg. = Batting average; HR = Home runs; RBI = Runs batted in

Player	G	AB	R	H	Avg.	HR	RBI
Randy Velarde	77	280	47	78	.279	9	34
Jim Leyritz	75	249	47	66	.265	17	58
Gerald Williams	57	86	19	25	.291	4	13
Matt Nokes	28	79	11	23	.291	7	19
Daryl Boston	52	77	11	14	.182	4	14
Kevin Elster	7	20	0	0	.000	0	0
Dave Silvestri	12	18	3	2	.111	1	2
Russ Davis	4	14	0	2	.143	0	1
Bob Melvin	9	14	2	4	.286	1	3
Robert Eenhoorn	3	4	1	2	.500	0	0

=== Pitching ===
==== Starting pitchers ====
Note: G = Games pitched; IP = Innings pitched; W = Wins; L = Losses; ERA = Earned run average; SO = Strikeouts

Player	G	IP	W	L	ERA	SO
Jimmy Key	25	168.0	17	4	3.27	97
Jim Abbott	24	160.1	9	8	4.55	90
Mélido Pérez	22	151.1	9	4	4.10	109
Terry Mulholland	24	120.2	6	7	6.49	72
Scott Kamieniecki	22	117.1	8	6	3.76	71
Bob Ojeda	2	3.0	0	0	24.00	3

==== Other pitchers ====
Note: G = Games pitched; IP = Innings pitched; W = Wins; L = Losses; ERA = Earned run average; SO = Strikeouts

Player	G	IP	W	L	ERA	SO
Sterling Hitchcock	23	49.1	4	1	4.20	37

===== Relief pitchers =====
Note: G = Games pitched; W = Wins; L = Losses; SV = Saves; ERA = Earned run average; SO = Strikeouts

Player	G	W	L	SV	ERA	SO
Steve Howe	40	3	0	15	1.80	18
Bob Wickman	53	5	4	6	3.09	56
Xavier Hernandez	31	4	4	6	5.85	37
Paul Gibson	30	1	1	0	4.97	21
Donn Pall	26	1	2	0	3.60	21
Joe Ausanio	13	2	1	0	5.17	15
Jeff Reardon	11	1	0	2	8.38	4
Greg A. Harris	3	0	1	0	5.40	4
Rob Murphy	3	0	0	0	16.20	0
Mark Hutton	2	0	0	0	4.91	1

== Awards and honors ==
- Buck Showalter – American League Manager of the Year, 1995 American League All Star Manager (In honor of best record in American League in 1994)
- Paul O'Neill – American League Batting Champion (.359)

All-Star Game

- Paul O'Neill, reserve
- Wade Boggs, third base
- Jimmy Key, pitcher

== Farm system ==
Level	Team	League	Manager
AAA	Columbus Clippers	International League	Stump Merrill
AA	Albany-Colonie Yankees	Eastern League	Bill Evers
A	Tampa Yankees	Florida State League	Jake Gibbs
A	Greensboro Bats	South Atlantic League	Trey Hillman
A-Short Season	Oneonta Yankees	New York–Penn League	Ken Dominguez
Rookie	GCL Yankees	Gulf Coast League	Héctor López

LEAGUE CHAMPIONS: Tampa
