= Mike Maksudian =

American baseball player (born 1966)

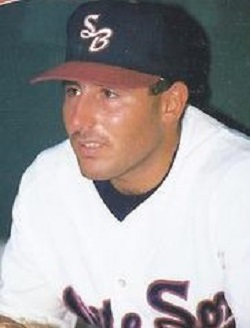
- Catcher
- Born: May 28, 1966 (age 60); Belleville, Illinois, U.S.
- Batted: Left Threw: Right

MLB debut
- September 2, 1992, for the Toronto Blue Jays

Last MLB appearance
- August 10, 1994, for the Chicago Cubs

MLB statistics
- Batting average: .220
- Home runs: 0
- Runs batted in: 6
- Stats at Baseball Reference

Teams
- Toronto Blue Jays (1992); Minnesota Twins (1993); Chicago Cubs (1994)

Michael Bryant Maksudian (born May 28, 1966) is an American former professional baseball catcher. He played in Major League Baseball (MLB) for the Toronto Blue Jays (1992), the Minnesota Twins (1993), and the Chicago Cubs (1994).

In 41 career MLB at-bats, he collected 9 hits and 6 RBIs. He was famous for consuming insects in the Blue Jays bullpen during his time as a backup catcher.

Maksudian attended Parsippany High School, located in Parsippany-Troy Hills, in Morris County, New Jersey, then the University of South Alabama, in Mobile.

In 1987, he played collegiate summer baseball with the Falmouth Commodores of the Cape Cod Baseball League.
