= Tom Edens =

American baseball pitcher (born 1961)

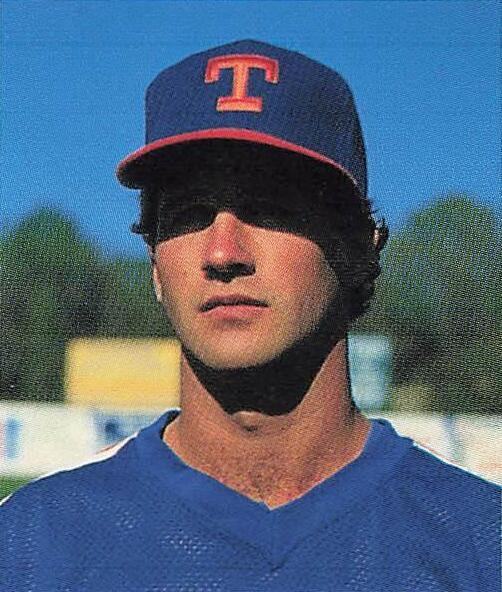
- Edens with the Tidewater Tides c. 1988
- Pitcher
- Born: June 9, 1961 (age 65); Ontario, Oregon, U.S.
- Batted: Right Threw: Right

MLB debut
- June 2, 1987, for the New York Mets

Last MLB appearance
- May 10, 1995, for the Chicago Cubs

MLB statistics
- Win–loss record: 19–12
- Earned run average: 3.86
- Strikeouts: 182
- Stats at Baseball Reference

Teams
- New York Mets (1987); Milwaukee Brewers (1990); Minnesota Twins (1991–1992); Houston Astros (1993–1994); Philadelphia Phillies (1994); Chicago Cubs (1995)

Thomas Patrick Edens (born June 9, 1961) is an American former professional baseball pitcher who played in Major League Baseball (MLB) for the New York Mets (1987), Milwaukee Brewers (1990), Minnesota Twins (1991–1992), Houston Astros (1993–1994), Philadelphia Phillies (1994), and Chicago Cubs (1995).

Edens was drafted in the 14th round (361st overall) out of Fruitland High School in Fruitland, Idaho by the Kansas City Royals in the 1983 Major League Baseball draft. Late in 1984 Spring Training, he was traded to the New York Mets for Tucker Ashford. Over the next three-plus seasons, Edens worked his way up through their Minor League Baseball (MiLB) farm system. Eventually, he received the call to join the parent club, making his MLB debut with the visiting Mets on June 2, 1987, against the Los Angeles Dodgers. Edens pitched five innings, allowing eight hits and three earned runs, while striking out three and yielding two bases on balls — all of which resulted in a no-decision. (The Mets would eventually lose the game as a result of a three-run Dodgers rally, in the bottom of the eighth inning — against veteran left-handed relief pitcher Jesse Orosco.)

Pitching for the 1992 Minnesota Twins, Edens posted a 2.83 earned run average (ERA), with three saves, and a 6–3 win–loss record, appearing in 52 games.
