= Derek Lee (baseball) =

American baseball player (born 1966)

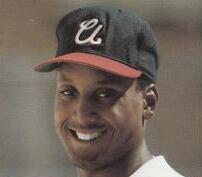
- Lee with the Utica Blue Sox c. 1988
- Outfielder
- Born: July 28, 1966 (age 59); Chicago, Illinois, U.S.
- Batted: Left Threw: Right

MLB debut
- June 27, 1993, for the Minnesota Twins

Last MLB appearance
- July 22, 1993, for the Minnesota Twins

MLB statistics
- Batting average: .152
- Home runs: 0
- Runs batted in: 4
- Stats at Baseball Reference

Teams
- Minnesota Twins (1993)

Derek Gerald Lee (born July 28, 1966) is an American former Major League Baseball outfielder who appeared in 15 games for the Minnesota Twins during the 1993 season. Listed at 6' 1", 200 lb., Lee batted left-handed and threw right-handed. He was born in Chicago, Illinois.

Lee played for the State College of Florida and the University of South Florida and was drafted by four teams from 1985–1987, but did not sign with any of them. In 1986, he played collegiate summer baseball for the Falmouth Commodores of the Cape Cod Baseball League (CCBL). In 1987, he returned to the CCBL and played for the Harwich Mariners, hitting a key game-winning home run in the league championship series to help Harwich to the league title.

Lee finally signed with the Chicago White Sox after being selected in the 1988 MLB draft. He then was claimed off waivers by the Twins in 1992, and was brought up to the major-league club for about one month. The following offseason, he was sent to the Montreal Expos in exchange for a minor leaguer.

In between, Lee played winter ball with the Caribes de Oriente club of the Venezuelan Professional Baseball League.
