= Keith Garagozzo =

American baseball player (born 1969)

- Pitcher
- Born: October 25, 1969 (age 55); Camden, New Jersey, U.S.
- Batted: Left Threw: Left

MLB debut
- April 5, 1994, for the Minnesota Twins

Last MLB appearance
- April 28, 1994, for the Minnesota Twins

MLB statistics
- Win–loss record: 0–0
- Earned run average: 9.64
- Strikeouts: 3
- Stats at Baseball Reference

Teams
- Minnesota Twins (1994)

Keith John Garagozzo (born October 25, 1969) is a former American Major League Baseball pitcher, who appeared in 7 games for the Minnesota Twins in 1994.

Garagozzo was drafted by the New York Yankees in the 9th round of the 1991 Amateur draft out of the University of Delaware.
