= Brad Cornett =

American baseball player (born 1969)

- Pitcher
- Born: February 4, 1969 (age 56); Lamesa, Texas, U.S.
- Batted: Right Threw: Right

MLB debut
- June 8, 1994, for the Toronto Blue Jays

Last MLB appearance
- May 12, 1995, for the Toronto Blue Jays

MLB statistics
- Win–loss record: 1-3
- Earned run average: 7.00
- Strikeouts: 26
- Stats at Baseball Reference

Teams
- Toronto Blue Jays (1994–1995)

Brad Byron Cornett (born February 4, 1969) is an American former professional baseball pitcher. Cornett played for the Toronto Blue Jays of Major League Baseball (MLB) for parts of the 1994 and 1995 seasons.

Signed by the Blue Jays as an undrafted free agent out of Lubbock Christian University in 1992, Cornett made his major league debut in just his third season of professional baseball.
