= Darren Reed =

American baseball player (born 1965)

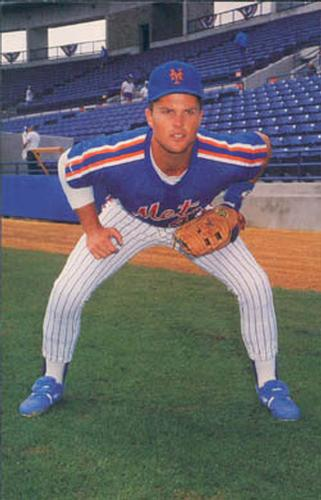
- Outfielder
- Born: October 16, 1965 (age 60); Ojai, California
- Batted: Right Threw: Right

MLB debut
- May 1, 1990, for the New York Mets

Last MLB appearance
- September 30, 1992, for the Minnesota Twins

MLB statistics
- Batting average: .183
- Home runs: 6
- Runs batted in: 16
- Stats at Baseball Reference

Teams
- New York Mets (1990); Montreal Expos (1992); Minnesota Twins (1992)

Darren A Douglass Reed (born October 16, 1965) is an American former professional baseball outfielder. He played in Major League Baseball for the New York Mets, Montreal Expos, and Minnesota Twins.

== Professional career ==
He played with the New York Mets in 1990 and with both the Montreal Expos and Minnesota Twins in 1992. He played a total of 82 Major League games, 26 for the Mets, 42 for the Expos and 14 for the Twins. Overall, he had a major league batting average of .183 with 6 home runs and 16 runs batted in.

Reed also played 791 minor league baseball games between 1984 and 1996. He played minor league games in the Atlanta Braves', Oakland Athletics' and New York Yankees' organizations in addition to the Mets' and Expos'. As a minor leaguer, he had a batting average of .281 with 90 home runs and 381 runs batted in. He also pitched one inning for the Richmond Braves in 1995 without giving up a run. He also played part of the 1994 season with the Leones de Yucatán in the Mexican League.
