= 1994–95 Major League Baseball strike =

- Date: August 12, 1994 – April 2, 1995 (7 months and 3 weeks)
- Location: United States; Canada
- Caused by: Expiration of the previous MLB collective bargaining agreement on December 31, 1993; MLB team owners' proposal for a salary cap to be included in the next MLB collective bargaining agreement
- Goals: Owners proposed revenue-sharing plan in addition to a salary cap
- Result: Agreement reached to end strike via injunction on April 2, 1995, without a salary cap: 1994 World Series canceled on September 14, 1994; implementation of expanded postseason delayed until 1995; Owners agree to begin 1995 season with replacement players on January 13, 1995; 1995 season reduced to 144 games per team; Players were bound by the terms of the expired agreement until a new collective bargaining agreement was reached; Injunction that ended the strike upheld on September 29

Parties
Major League Baseball Players Association (MLBPA)	Major League Baseball (MLB)	Federal government of the United States

Lead figures
Donald Fehr (executive director)	Bud Selig (acting commissioner); Richard Ravitch (MLB owners representative)	Bill Clinton (President); Sonia Sotomayor (District Court judge); William Usery Jr. (federal mediator)

The 1994–95 Major League Baseball strike was the eighth and longest work stoppage in Major League Baseball (MLB) history, as well as the fourth in-season work stoppage in 22 years. The strike began on August 12, 1994, and resulted in the remainder of that season, including the postseason and the World Series, being canceled. This was the first time in ninety years, since 1904, that a World Series was not played. The strike was suspended on April 2, 1995, after 232 days, making it the longest such stoppage in MLB history and the longest work stoppage in a major professional sports league at the time (breaking the record set by the 1981 strike, also in MLB).

As a result of the strike, a total of 948 games were canceled. Both the 1994 and 1995 seasons were not played to a complete 162 games; the strike began after the teams had played at least 113 games in 1994. Each team played a total of 144 games in 1995.

This was the first time in North American professional sports that an entire postseason was canceled because of labor disputes; the second (and most recent) was the cancellation of the National Hockey League's 2005 Stanley Cup playoffs as a result of the entire 2004–05 season being canceled. Coincidentally, the NHL also experienced a labor dispute of their own in 1994.

== Background ==
In response to a worsening financial situation in baseball, the owners of Major League Baseball teams collectively proposed a salary cap to their players. Ownership claimed that small-market clubs would fall by the wayside unless teams agreed to share local broadcasting revenues (to increase equity among the teams) and enact a salary cap, a proposal that the players adamantly opposed. On January 18, 1994, the owners approved a new revenue-sharing plan keyed to a salary cap, which required the players' approval. The following day, the owners amended the Major League agreement by giving complete power to the commissioner on labor negotiations.

The dispute was played out with a backdrop of years of hostility and mistrust between the two sides. What arguably stood in the way of a compromise settlement was the absence of an official commissioner ever since the owners forced Fay Vincent to resign in September 1992. In the 1980s, MLB owners were three times found to have colluded with each other by agreeing not to sign free agents from other teams in order to keep salaries down, and to not have any contracts longer than three years to limit owners’ risks in case of injuries, and owners were ordered to make payments to players in each case. This reduced trust between players and owners.

Vincent said the owners had colluded in the signing of free agents, which led to "a $280 million theft" by Bud Selig and Jerry Reinsdorf, which "polluted labor relations in baseball" and left Donald Fehr, executive director of the Major League Baseball Players Association, with "no trust in Selig." On February 11, 1994, the owners greatly reduced the commissioner's power to act in "the best interests of baseball."

Owner representative Richard Ravitch officially unveiled the ownership proposal on June 14, 1994. The proposal would guarantee a record $1 billion in salary and benefits. But the ownership proposal also would have forced clubs to fit their payrolls into a more evenly based structure. Salary arbitration would have been eliminated, free agency would begin after four years rather than six, and owners would have retained the right to keep a four- or five-year player by matching his best offer. Owners claimed that their proposal would raise average salaries from $1.2 million in 1994 to $2.6 million by 2001.

Fehr rejected the offer from the owners on July 18. He believed a salary cap was simply a way for owners to clean up their own disparity problems with no benefit to the players.

On July 13, Fehr said if serious negotiations between the players and the owners did not begin soon, the players could go out on strike in September of that year, threatening the postseason. On December 31, 1993, Major League Baseball's collective bargaining agreement ran out with no new agreement yet signed.

== Strike ==
=== June ===
As negotiations continued to heat up, the owners decided to withhold $7.8 million that they were required to pay per previous agreement into the players' pension and benefit plans. The final straw came on June 23 when the Senate Judiciary Committee failed to approve an antitrust legislation by a vote of 10–7. According to Fehr, the action left the players with little choice but to strike. "We felt in '94 we were pushed into it," he said. "I still think that's a justified conclusion."

=== July–August ===
On July 28, the Players Association executive board set August 12, 1994, as a strike date. When that day came, the players went ahead with their threat to walk off the job. The last games of that baseball season were played on August 11, 1994.

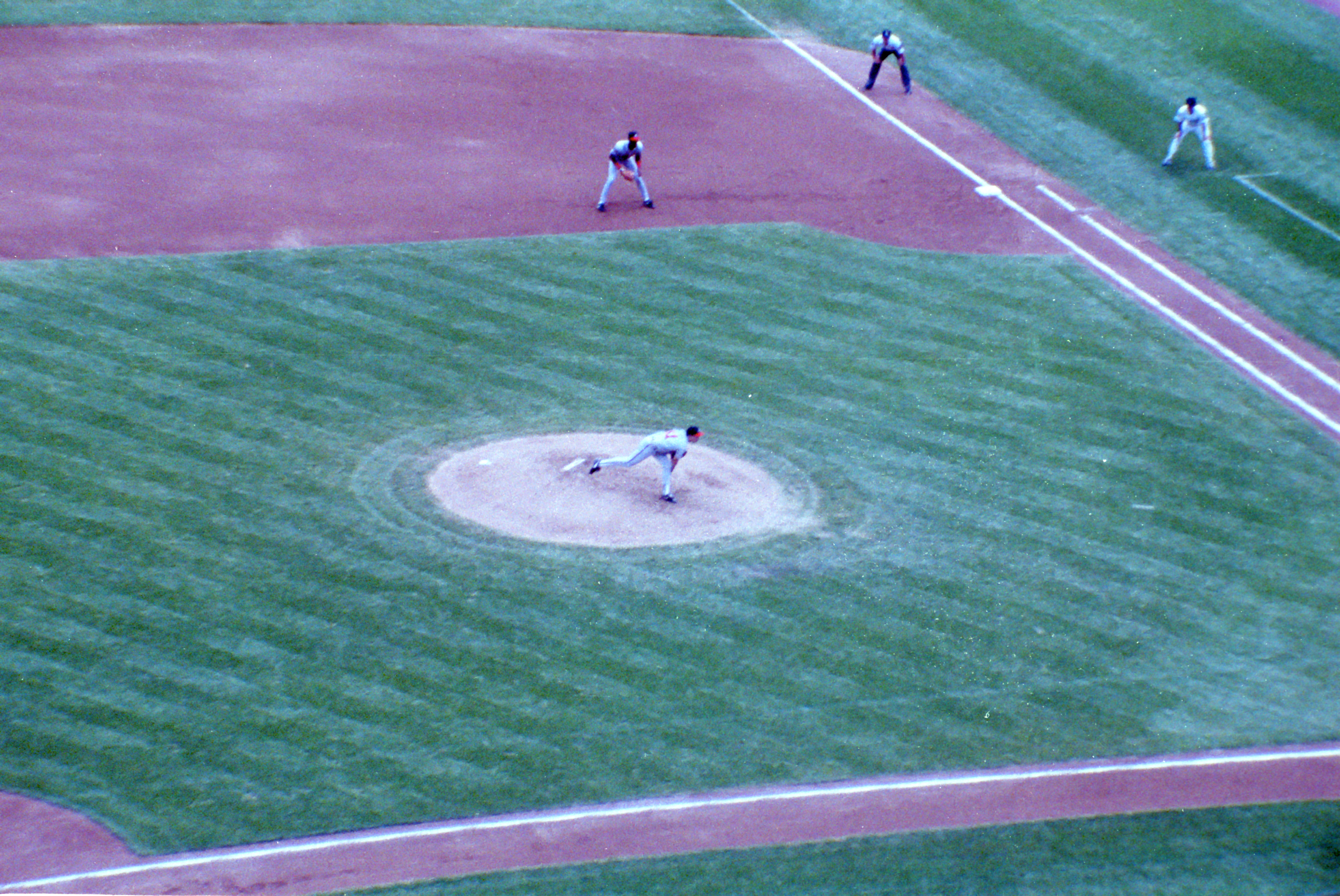
Greg Maddux pitching for the Atlanta Braves at Mile High Stadium in what would become the final game of the 1994 season

On August 31, three-and-a-half hours of negotiations with federal mediators produced no progress in the strike, and no further talks were scheduled as the strike went into its 4th week. According to then-acting commissioner Bud Selig, September 9 was the tentative deadline for canceling the rest of the season if no agreement was reached between the owners and players. The MLBPA offered a counterproposal to ownership on September 8 calling for a two-percent tax on the 16 franchises with the highest payrolls to be divided among the other 12 clubs. Teams in both leagues would share 25% of all gate receipts under the MLBPA's plan. The owners responded by claiming that the measures wouldn't meet the cost.

The rest of the season, including the World Series, was called off by Selig on September 14. Selig acknowledged that the strike had torn an irreparable hole in the game's fabric. The move to cancel the rest of the season meant the loss of $580 million in ownership revenue and $230 million in player salaries. In 1994, the average MLB salary was an estimated $1.2 million.

=== Repercussions ===
The Montreal Expos were enjoying the best season in their history at the time of the strike. The Expos had the best record in baseball, 74–40, and were six games ahead of the Atlanta Braves in the NL East despite having the second-lowest payroll in MLB. Most baseball writers considered the Expos to be World Series contenders. Coincidentally, the only time that the Expos had made it to the postseason was in 1981, the last time that there was a significant players' strike in Major League Baseball. That year, Montreal had qualified by winning the second half of the season.

Chicago White Sox star Frank Thomas, who wound up winning the American League's Most Valuable Player (MVP) Award for the second year in a row in 1994, said "I've had a career year, but I'm not going to finish it." Tony Gwynn had a chance to be the first hitter to finish a season with a batting average at .400 or better since Ted Williams did so in 1941, as he was batting .394 at the time of the strike. The strike also cost Matt Williams of the San Francisco Giants a chance to beat Roger Maris' single season home run record. When the strike forced the cancellation of the remaining 47 games of the season, Williams had already hit 43 home runs, on pace to match Maris' single season record of 61 home runs. Cleveland Indians second baseman Carlos Baerga was unable to extend his record two-year streak of 20 home runs, 200 hits, and 100 RBIs by a second baseman because of the strike. Seattle Mariners star Ken Griffey Jr., who led the American League with 40 home runs at the time of the strike, summed it up by saying, "We picked a bad season to have a good year." Kevin Mitchell of the Cincinnati Reds, Julio Franco of the Chicago White Sox, and Shane Mack of the Minnesota Twins opted during the strike to play in Japan in 1995.

By the third day of the strike, Cleveland Indians owner Richard Jacobs directed that all souvenirs being sold at the Indians' gift shop carrying the words "inaugural season at Jacobs Field" be sold at half price.

The Colorado Rockies were completing their last season at Mile High Stadium with an attendance of 3,281,511 through 57 home games for an average of 57,570 per game. At that pace, the team would have had a good chance of drawing over 4.6 million fans in their 81 home games if the season had continued. This would have eclipsed the major league season attendance record of 4,483,350 fans set by the Rockies only the season before.

The strike meant that fans would not witness what was described as "one of the worst division races in history." The Texas Rangers were leading the newly reformed AL West despite being 10 games under .500. The last-place California Angels were only 5 1/2 games out despite having the second-worst record in the majors at 21 games under .500—on pace for 96 losses. In fact, the two last place teams in the other American League divisions (namely, the Detroit Tigers of the AL East and Milwaukee Brewers of the AL Central) had better records than the Rangers.

The National League's MVP award was given to Jeff Bagwell. His hand was broken by a pitch on August 10, just before the players' strike began; had the season continued, he would likely have missed the remainder of the year and might not have won the MVP. But because of the timing of his "lucky break", Bagwell became just the fourth player in National League history to win the award unanimously.

The strike caused a transaction to take an absurd turn. The Minnesota Twins traded Dave Winfield to the Cleveland Indians for a player to be named later. Since the strike led to the season being canceled, no further transactions could be made until it was settled. The Twins would officially be listed as having sold Winfield to the Indians, but the actual transaction was conducted much differently. Instead of the Indians buying the contract outright, team management went out for a meal with Twins management and the Indians paid the tab; this essentially meant that Winfield had been traded for dinner.

Arguably, the biggest storyline of the strike was the New York Yankees. In having the best record in the American League, which was also the second-best record in baseball at 70–43, with a 6 1/2 game lead over the Baltimore Orioles in the AL East, the largest division lead of any division leader, the strike cost their captain, Don Mattingly, a chance at making the postseason for the first time in his 13-year career. The Yankees had not been in the postseason since 1981. Because the Yankees' prior postseason chances had also been cut short by a strike, news media reported on the parallels between the two Yankee teams (1981 and 1994), both of which had division leads taken away by strike actions.

Major League Baseball would not attempt another salary cap until the 2026 season.

=== December ===
On December 5, it was announced Richard Ravitch would step down as negotiator for the owners on December 31, 1994. Ravitch instead resigned on December 6, 1994. On December 14, labor talks headed by federal mediator William Usery broke down. The next day, the owners approved a salary cap plan by a vote of 25–3, but agreed to delay implementing it so that another round of talks with the players could be held. On December 23, with negotiations at a standstill, the owners unilaterally implemented a salary cap.

=== January 1995 ===
On January 4, 1995, five bills aimed at ending the baseball strike were introduced into Congress. The next day, Fehr declared all 895 unsigned Major League players to be free agents in response to unilateral contract changes made by the owners. On January 10, arbitrator Thomas Roberts awarded 11 players a total of almost $10 million as a result of collusion charges brought against the owners. On January 26, both players and owners were ordered by President Bill Clinton to resume bargaining and reach an agreement by February 6. Unfortunately, President Clinton's deadline came and went with no resolution of the strike. Just five days earlier, the owners agreed to revoke the salary cap and return to the old agreement.

=== Replacement players ===
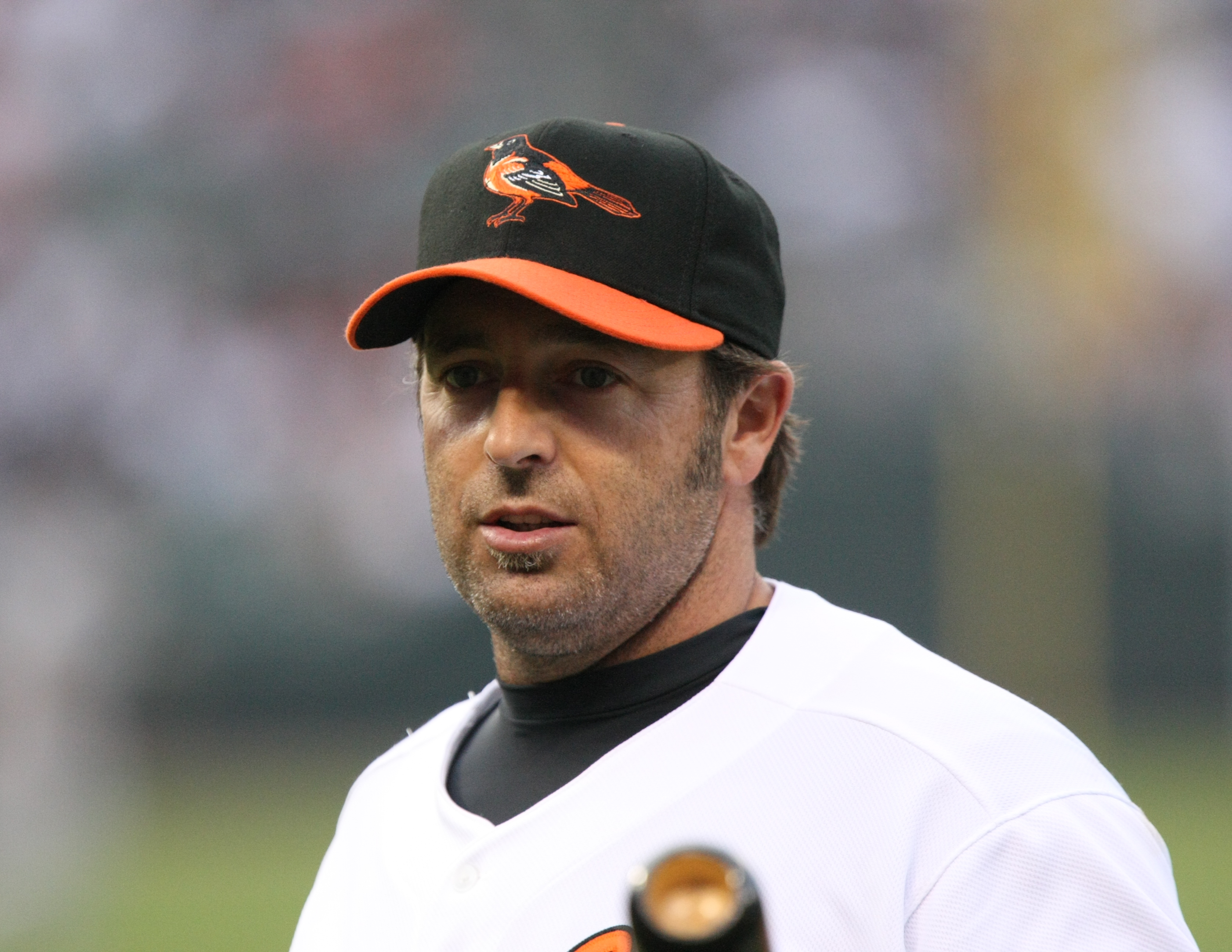
Kevin Millar had no Major League experience before becoming a replacement player

After the deadline passed with no compromises, the use of replacement players for spring training and regular season games was approved by baseball's executive council on January 13. Replacement players were guaranteed $5,000 for reporting to spring training and another $5,000 if they made the Opening Day roster. Selig declared that, "We are committed to playing the 1995 season and will do so with the best players willing to play."

On March 14, the players' union announced that it would not settle the strike if replacement players were used in regular season games, and if results were not voided. Detroit Tigers manager Sparky Anderson was put on an involuntary leave of absence as he refused to manage replacement players. He retired soon after the 1995 season ended, disillusioned with the state of the sport.

Replacement players created major issues for two American League teams. The Toronto Blue Jays could not play games with replacement players or umpires in Ontario, due to labour code amendments passed by the Ontarian Government that prohibited replacement workers. Manager Cito Gaston and his coaching staff were sent to work with minor league players, and the team announced that games featuring replacement workers would be played at their spring training facility in Dunedin, Florida. The Baltimore Orioles, owned by labor lawyer Peter Angelos, announced they would also not be using replacement players. On March 20, the Orioles canceled the remainder of their spring training games. On March 28, Maryland governor Parris Glendening signed a law barring teams playing at Camden Yards from using replacement players.

On March 24, Atlanta Braves replacement pitcher Dave Shotkoski was shot and killed near the team hotel in West Palm Beach, Florida. Fellow replacement player Terry Blocker assisted police in locating the suspect, who was later convicted of second-degree murder.

=== Television deal collapses ===
Following the end of the 1993 season, CBS Sports lost the rights to broadcast baseball games on television. Production of nationally televised games was taken over by MLB itself, which sold the games as brokered programming to ABC and NBC as part of a joint venture that was referred to as The Baseball Network. Originally, the idea was for ABC and NBC to share a slate of games aired in prime time during the week, with the two networks alternating coverage of the All-Star Game and World Series and splitting the Division and League Championship Series between them. The agreement was to run for six seasons and end in 1999, with ABC and NBC airing the World Series and All-Star Game three times each; NBC would air the All-Star Game in even numbered years while ABC would do so in odd numbered years, and the network that did not air the All-Star Game would instead carry the World Series.

The strike, however, resulted in ABC losing out on two weeks of coverage and the World Series and NBC losing out on all of its allotted regular season games. MLB and the local NBC and ABC stations lost a combined $595 million in advertising revenue, and both networks announced that they would be opting out of the deal after the shortened 1995 season. Both networks would share coverage of the World Series that year, with ABC airing the odd numbered games and NBC the even numbered games.

Fox became the new broadcast partner for MLB in 1996 and has remained as such since. NBC did elect to retain some broadcast rights; however, it continued to air the All-Star Game in even numbered years and retained its rights to air the World Series in odd numbered years until Fox gained exclusive rights to national MLB broadcasts in 2001.

== Strike ends ==
On March 29, 1995, the players voted to return to work if a U.S. District Court judge supported the National Labor Relations Board's unfair labor practices complaint against the owners, which was filed on March 27. By a vote of 26–2, owners supported the use of replacement players. Judge (and future Supreme Court Justice) Sonia Sotomayor of the U.S. District Court for the Southern District of New York issued a preliminary injunction against the owners on March 31. On April 2, the day before the season was scheduled to start with the replacement players, the strike came to an official end at 232 days. Judge Sotomayor's decision received support from a panel of the Court of Appeals for the Second Circuit, which denied the owners' request to stay the ruling.

As part of the terms of the injunction, the players and owners were to be bound to the terms of the expired collective bargaining agreement until a new one could be reached and the start of the season would be postponed three weeks, with teams playing an abbreviated 144-game season instead of a 162-game season.

== Post-strike ==
=== 1995 season ===
During the first days of the 1995 season, some fans remained irate at both players and owners. Attendance at the games plummeted, as did television ratings, to a greater extent than during the last significant players' strike in 1981.

While a total of 50,010,016 fans had attended the 1,600 MLB regular season games played in 1994, averaging 31,256 per game, a total of 50,416,880 fans attended the 2,016 games of the 1995 MLB regular season, for an average attendance of just 25,008 per game. This represented a decline in average attendance of 20% from 1994 to 1995.

A few of the fans who showed up demonstrated their frustration, and booed the players; the strike was seen as the worst work stoppage in sports history, leaving the game in crisis and some fans angry. Writer Chuck Klosterman observed that during previous strikes, public anger was directed most fervently at players, but the 1994 strike attracted outrage at both players and owners in apparently equal measure.

Among the major examples of fan protests:

- Three men wearing T-shirts emblazoned with "Greed" leaped onto the field at Shea Stadium to a standing ovation, and tossed $160 in $1 bills at the players' feet before being restrained by security, who were loudly booed as the men were escorted from the field.
- In Cincinnati, one fan paid for a plane to fly over Riverfront Stadium that carried a banner reading "Owners & Players: To hell with all of you!"
- Fans in Pittsburgh disrupted the Opening Day game between the Montreal Expos and the Pittsburgh Pirates by throwing various objects on the field, causing a 17-minute delay before being warned that the game would be declared a forfeit to the Expos; however, they continued to boo afterwards.
- In Detroit, fans booed and hurled beer bottles, cans, baseballs, cigarette lighters, and a hubcap onto the field, causing a 12-minute delay, while holding up signs saying "Field of ~~Dreams~~ Greed" and "Strike, Owner$ Win, Player$ Win, Fans Lose".
- While 50,425 fans showed up for the New York Yankees' home opener against the Texas Rangers, it was the smallest opening day crowd at Yankee Stadium since 1990. MLBPA president Fehr attended the game, angering many fans who blamed him for ruining their team's postseason chances, and also what would have been Don Mattingly's postseason debut. Fans booed Fehr and yelled "You ruined the game!" in response to him having attended the last game played at Yankee Stadium before the strike and also booed him as he left the stadium. During the game, one fan held up a sign saying "$HAME ON YOU!"

The opening games were played with replacement umpires, the first time since Opening Day 1991 that replacement umpires were used.

On August 3, 1995, the Senate Judiciary Committee sent a bill calling for the partial repeal of baseball's antitrust exemption to the full Senate on a 9–8 vote. In August, George Nicolau, baseball's arbitrator since 1986, was fired by the owners. On September 29, a three-judge panel in New York voted unanimously to uphold the injunction that brought the end to the strike in April. The owners had appealed the injunction issued on March 31, but the panel said the Players Relations Committee had illegally attempted to eliminate free agency and salary arbitration.

=== Replacement players on postseason teams ===
While replacement players from the 1995 spring training were allowed to play on postseason teams, these players were not allowed to have their names or likenesses on any commemorative merchandise; furthermore, they could not be featured in video games or tabletop games and were instead replaced by placeholder players. The affected players include Shane Spencer of the 1998, 1999, and 2000 New York Yankees; Damian Miller of the 2001 Arizona Diamondbacks; Brendan Donnelly of the 2002 Anaheim Angels; Kevin Millar and Brian Daubach of the 2004 Boston Red Sox; and Jamie Walker of the 2006 Detroit Tigers. Cory Lidle, who would go on to play on seven different MLB teams between 1997 and 2006, would face the same prohibitions.

=== Long-term impact ===
Arguably the largest impact was to the Montreal Expos. The strike was considered to be the start of the franchise's downfall in Montreal, eventually leading MLB to relocate them to Washington, D.C., to become the current Washington Nationals. The Expos were one of the league's top teams, and had the best record in MLB, and were six games ahead of the Atlanta Braves in the NL East. In 1995, they were forced to lower payroll and sell off their four highest-paid stars (Marquis Grissom, Ken Hill, Larry Walker, and John Wetteland) in the span of less than a week in spring training. With the strike negatively affecting its fan base, the Expos would never recover from the incident. Despite respectable performances in 1996, 2002 and 2003, the team never came close to contending again; the team was purchased by Major League Baseball after the 2001 season, and would become the focus of contraction rumors until MLB moved the Expos to Washington, D.C., to become the Washington Nationals after the 2004 season.

After the 1994–95 strike, players' strikes became less common, although major professional sports leagues have seen lockouts amidst labor disputes between owners and players' unions.

== See also ==
- 1994 Major League Baseball season
- 1995 Major League Baseball season
- 2021–22 Major League Baseball lockout
- 2004–05 NHL lockout
- 2012–13 NHL lockout
- 1998–99 NBA lockout
- 2011–12 NBA lockout
- 2011 NFL lockout
- 2012 NFL referee lockout
