= Matt Turner (baseball) =

American baseball player (1967–2019)

- Turner with the Florida Marlins
- Pitcher
- Born: February 18, 1967; Lexington, Kentucky, U.S.
- Died: January 27, 2019 (aged 51); Lexington, Kentucky, U.S.
- Batted: Right Threw: Right

MLB debut
- April 23, 1993, for the Florida Marlins

Last MLB appearance
- April 30, 1994, for the Cleveland Indians

MLB statistics
- Win–loss record: 5–5
- Earned run average: 2.79
- Strikeouts: 64

CPBL statistics
- Win–loss record: 3–0
- Earned run average: 1.93
- Strikeouts: 33
- Stats at Baseball Reference

Teams
- Florida Marlins (1993); Cleveland Indians (1994); Wei Chuan Dragons (1999)

William Matthew Turner (February 18, 1967 – January 27, 2019) was an American professional baseball relief pitcher who played in Major League Baseball from 1993 through 1994. He batted and threw right-handed. In a two-season career in Major League Baseball, Turner posted a 5–5 record with a 2.79 ERA and one save in 64 games.

== Career ==
Turner was signed by the Atlanta Braves as a free agent in 1986. Then he was sent by Atlanta to the Houston Astros on July 31, 1991, along with a player to be named later (Earl Sanders) for Jim Clancy. On October 21, 1992, Turner became the first Triple–A player to sign with the Florida Marlins. Turner made his major league debut with the Marlins in 1993 coming out from the bullpen. In 55 appearances, he went 4–5 with a 2.91 ERA and 59 strikeouts in 68.0 innings. The Cleveland Indians acquired him on April 3, 1994, for Jeremy Hernandez. 1994 would be his last major league season. One highlight of Turner's brief MLB career occurred on April 13, 1994. In an extra inning Indians victory over the Angels, Turner pitched a perfect 10th inning to earn his one and only major league save. On May 26, 1994, he was placed on the 60 day disabled list as he was diagnosed with Hodgkin’s Disease. He requested and received his unconditional release on August 24, 1994, so he could be paid the remainder of his salary for the year as the players weren't getting paid while on strike. The Indians re–signed him to a minor league contract with an invitation to 1995 spring training on December 15, 1994, but he did not pitch in the majors again.

Following his major league career, Turner pitched in minor league baseball with the Wichita Wranglers (Double–A) and Omaha Royals (Triple–A), as well as the Wei Chuan Dragons of the Chinese Professional Baseball League (CPBL), and Langosteros de Cancun and Acereros de Monclova of the Mexican League (LMB).

== Personal life ==
Turner died on January 27, 2019, at the age of 51 after a fourth and final battle with cancer.
