= J. T. Bruett =

American baseball player (born 1967)

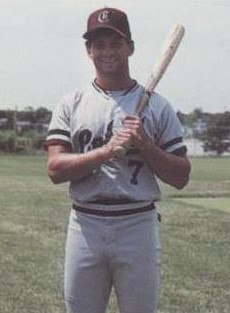
- Outfielder
- Born: October 8, 1967 (age 58); Milwaukee, Wisconsin, U.S.
- Batted: Left Threw: Left

MLB debut
- June 3, 1992, for the Minnesota Twins

Last MLB appearance
- May 2, 1993, for the Minnesota Twins

MLB statistics
- Batting average: .250
- Runs batted in: 3
- Stolen bases: 6
- Stats at Baseball Reference

Teams
- Minnesota Twins (1992–1993)

Joseph Timothy Bruett (born October 8, 1967) is an American former professional baseball outfielder. He played parts of two seasons in Major League Baseball (MLB) for the Minnesota Twins.

== Amateur career ==
Bruett played at the collegiate level with the Minnesota Golden Gophers. From 1986 to 1988, he played collegiate summer baseball with the Cotuit Kettleers of the Cape Cod Baseball League, and was named MVP of the league's All-Star Game in 1988. Bruett was selected in the 11th round of the 1988 Major League Baseball draft by the Minnesota Twins.

== Professional career ==
Bruett made his professional debut that same year with the Elizabethton Twins, where he batted .297 in 28 games. He also saw action in 3 games with the Class A Kenosha Twins before the season ended.

Bruett remained with Kenosha during the 1989 season, posting a .267 batting average, 3 home runs, 29 runs batted in, and 61 stolen bases over 120 games. He began with the 1990 season with the higher-Class A Visalia Oaks, where he batted .307 and stole 50 bases in 123 games. Toward the end of the year, Bruett was promoted to the Class AAA Portland Beavers. He batted .235 in 10 games with Portland. He spent the 1991 season at Portland, batting .284 in 99 games. He drove in 35 runs, but his stolen base total dipped to 21.

Bruett began the 1992 season with Portland before joining the Twins in June. He made his MLB debut on June 3. On June 13, Bruett singled off Chicago White Sox starter Jack McDowell for his first career hit. Bruett remained with the Twins through mid-July and his batting average gradually climbed to .244 before he returned to Portland. He rejoined the Twins for September, and for the season he posted a .250 batting average (19 for 76) in 56 games in the major leagues. Bruett also batted .250 in 77 games with Portland, drawing 60 walks and striking out only 27 times.

1n 1993, Bruett began the season in the majors for the first time in his career. He recorded a .250 batting average in 17 games, before returning to Portland in early May. Bruett made 90 appearances with Portland, posting a .322 average and driving in a career-high 40 runs.

Bruett spent the entire 1994 season in class AAA. Minnesota's AAA affiliate relocated after the 1993 season and was now known as the Salt Lake Buzz. Bruett recorded a .278 batting average in 46 appearances for Salt Lake. He also saw action in 64 games for the Charlotte Knights, the class AAA affiliate of the Cleveland Indians. Bruett posted a .252 average with Charlotte.

In 1995, Bruett made 44 appearances for the Omaha Royals, the class AAA affiliate of the Kansas City Royals. He recorded a .279 average, 2 homers, and 14 RBI with Omaha. 1996 was Bruett's final season as a professional baseball player. He spent the season with the St. Paul Saints of the independent Northern League. In 50 games with St. Paul, Bruett batted .320 and recorded 14 runs batted in.

== Personal life ==
Bruett works for the University of Minnesota, where he is employed as the director of the McNamara Academic Center. In 2001, he received a Master's degree in sport administration from the University of Illinois at Chicago.
