= Darren Hall (baseball) =

American baseball player (born 1964)

- Pitcher
- Born: July 14, 1964 (age 60); Marysville, Ohio, U.S.
- Batted: Right Threw: Right

MLB debut
- April 30, 1994, for the Toronto Blue Jays

Last MLB appearance
- August 11, 1998, for the Los Angeles Dodgers

MLB statistics
- Win–loss record: 5–12
- Earned run average: 3.93
- Strikeouts: 98
- Stats at Baseball Reference

Teams
- Toronto Blue Jays (1994–1995); Los Angeles Dodgers (1996–1998)

Michael Darren Hall (born July 14, 1964) is an American former professional baseball pitcher. He played in Major League Baseball (MLB) for the Toronto Blue Jays and Los Angeles Dodgers.
