= Kenmei Boku =

Korean baseball player

Kenmei Boku (朴賢明) is a Korean former baseball player who played in Japan. He played for the Osaka Tigers in the Japanese Baseball League. He reportedly ended up in North Korea.
