= Jeff Reboulet =

American baseball player (born 1964)

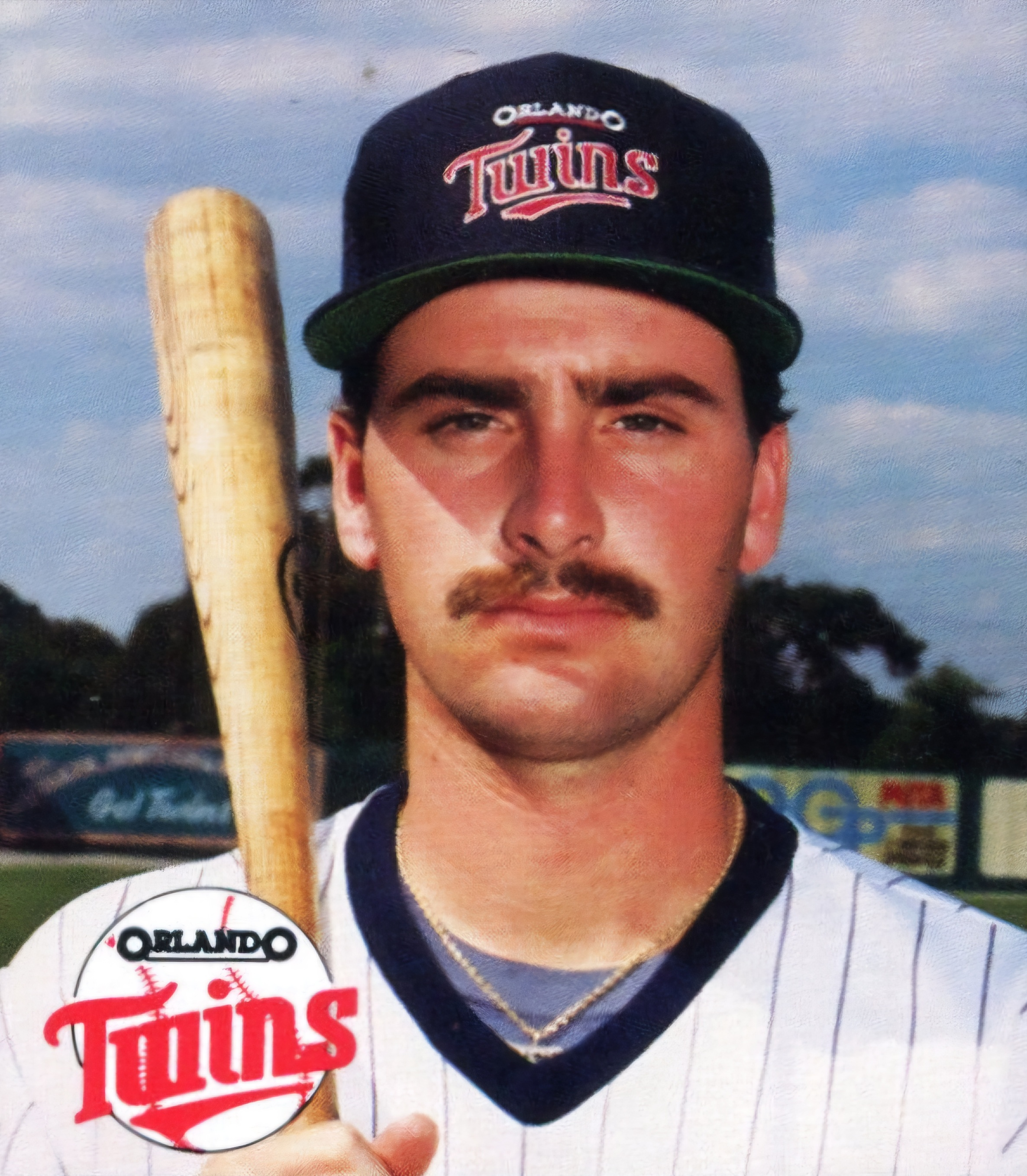
- Reboulet with the Orlando Twins c. 1988
- Infielder
- Born: April 30, 1964 (age 62); Dayton, Ohio, U.S.
- Batted: Right Threw: Right

MLB debut
- May 12, 1992, for the Minnesota Twins

Last MLB appearance
- September 27, 2003, for the Pittsburgh Pirates

MLB statistics
- Batting average: .240
- Home runs: 20
- Runs batted in: 202
- Stats at Baseball Reference

Teams
- Minnesota Twins (1992–1996); Baltimore Orioles (1997–1999); Kansas City Royals (2000); Los Angeles Dodgers (2001–2002); Pittsburgh Pirates (2003)

Jeffrey Allen Reboulet (born April 30, 1964) is an American former Major League Baseball infielder. He is an alumnus of Louisiana State University and a graduate of Archbishop Alter High School.

Drafted by the Minnesota Twins in the 10th round of the 1986 MLB amateur draft, Reboulet made his major league debut with the Twins on May 12, 1992, and appeared in his final game during the 2003 season.
