= Derek Parks =

American baseball player (born 1968)

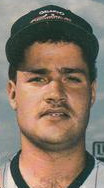
- Parks in 1988
- Catcher
- Born: September 29, 1968 (age 57); Covina, California, U.S.
- Batted: Right Threw: Right

MLB debut
- September 11, 1992, for the Minnesota Twins

Last MLB appearance
- August 5, 1994, for the Minnesota Twins

MLB statistics
- Batting average: .200
- Home runs: 1
- Runs batted in: 10
- Stats at Baseball Reference

Teams
- Minnesota Twins (1992–94)

Derek Gavin Parks (born September 29, 1968) is an American former Major League Baseball catcher. He played parts of three seasons in the majors (1992–1994) for the Minnesota Twins and was scouted as "durable" with "good power" and a "very strong arm." His daughter, Ashley, has been married to MLB pitcher Joe Kelly since November 2013.
