= Joe Ausanio =

American baseball player (born 1965)

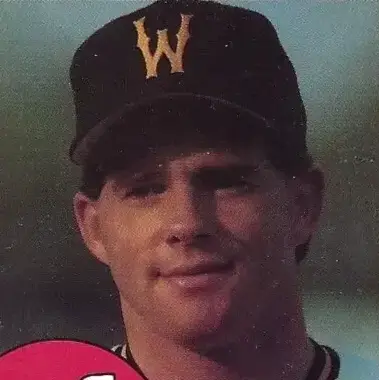
- Ausanio with the Watertown Pirates c. 1988
- Relief pitcher
- Born: December 9, 1965 (age 60); Kingston, New York, U.S.
- Batted: Right Threw: Right

MLB debut
- July 14, 1994, for the New York Yankees

Last MLB appearance
- September 15, 1995, for the New York Yankees

MLB statistics
- Win–loss record: 4–1
- Earned run average: 5.57
- Strikeouts: 51
- Stats at Baseball Reference

Teams
- New York Yankees (1994–1995)

Joseph John Ausanio (born December 9, 1965) is an American former Major League Baseball relief pitcher who appeared in 41 games for the New York Yankees in 1994 and 1995. He is the current Director of Baseball Operations for the New York Yankees High A affiliate Hudson Valley Renegades in the New York Penn League. He is also the current head coach of the Marist Red Foxes softball team.

== Early life ==
Ausanio was born in Kingston, New York and attended Kingston High School in Kingston. He played college baseball at Jacksonville University in Jacksonville, Florida.

== Professional career ==
Ausanio was drafted by the Pittsburgh Pirates in the 11th round (278th overall) in the 1988 Major League Baseball draft. In November 1992, he was selected off waivers by the Montreal Expos and in December 1993, he was drafted by the New York Yankees in the 1993 minor league draft. Ausanio played his first Major League game on July 14, 1994, for the Yankees and played for them until 1995. He was signed as a free agent by the New York Mets in November 1995 and finished his career with three appearances with the Colorado Rockies' Triple-A affiliate, the Colorado Springs Sky Sox in 1997.

After retiring as a player, Ausanio was a color commentator for the Hudson Valley Renegades (High-A affiliate of the New York Yankees) in 1998. He is currently the director of baseball operations for the Renegades and the head coach of the Marist Red Foxes softball team. Joe has also made several appearances in a professional wrestling ring, competing in four matches with the New York independent promotion Northeast Wrestling from 2012 to 2015. On September 22, 2012, in the main event of NEW's Wrestling Under The Stars in Fishkill, NY, Ausanio teamed with Goldust to defeat Romeo Roselli and Luke Robinson.

== Family life ==
Ausanio currently lives in New Windsor, New York with his family. He has two sons, Joey and Kevin.
