= Bernardo Brito =

Dominican baseball player (born 1963)

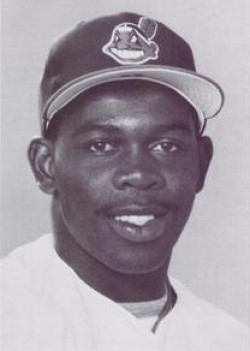
- Outfielder
- Born: December 4, 1963 (age 61); San Cristobal, Dominican Republic
- Batted: Right Threw: Right

Professional debut
- MLB: September 15, 1992, for the Minnesota Twins
- NPB: July 8, 1995, for the Nippon-Ham Fighters
- CPBL: April 8, 1997, for the China Times Eagles

Last appearance
- MLB: June 24, 1995, for the Minnesota Twins
- NPB: September 24, 1996, for the Nippon-Ham Fighters
- CPBL: April 15, 1997, for the China Times Eagles

MLB statistics
- Batting average: .219
- Home runs: 5
- Runs batted in: 12

NPB statistics
- Batting average: .272
- Home runs: 50
- Runs batted in: 133

CPBL statistics
- Batting average: .222
- Home runs: 1
- Runs batted in: 4
- Stats at Baseball Reference

Teams
- Minnesota Twins (1992–1995); Nippon-Ham Fighters (1995–1996); China Times Eagles (1997)

Bernardo Brito (born December 4, 1963) is a Dominican former professional baseball player who played outfield and designated hitter in the Major Leagues from 1992–1995. While having a successful minor league career, hitting 299 home runs and playing in three minor league all-star games over the course of 15 seasons, he would play only 40 games in the Major Leagues for the Minnesota Twins.

== Career ==
Brito's career began in 1981 with Batavia of the New York-Penn League, within the Cleveland Indians organization. He joined the Minnesota Twins organization in 1988. From 1984 to 1991, he won six home run titles in the minor leagues. When the Portland Beavers moved Salt Lake City in 1994, Brito endeared himself to the new fans by racking up 29 home runs and 122 RBI's in the team's first season as the Salt Lake Buzz.

Upon his mid-season release from the Twins in 1995, Brito took his talents to Japan, where he signed with the Nippon-Ham Fighters and spent the rest of 1995 (hitting 21 home runs in 56 games) and all of the 1996 season. Bernardo Brito was elected to the Pacific League All-Star team in 1996.

Released, along with Rob Ducey, by Nippon Ham following the 1996 season, Brito concluded his professional baseball career in 1998 with the Sioux Falls Canaries of the independent American Association. Brito began the season as the team's designated hitter, but chose to retire from playing and finished the season as the Canaries batting coach. In between, he played with the Tigres del Licey and Caimanes del Sur clubs of the Dominican Winter League, where he was known for his power hitting.
