= Larry Casian =

American baseball player (born 1965)

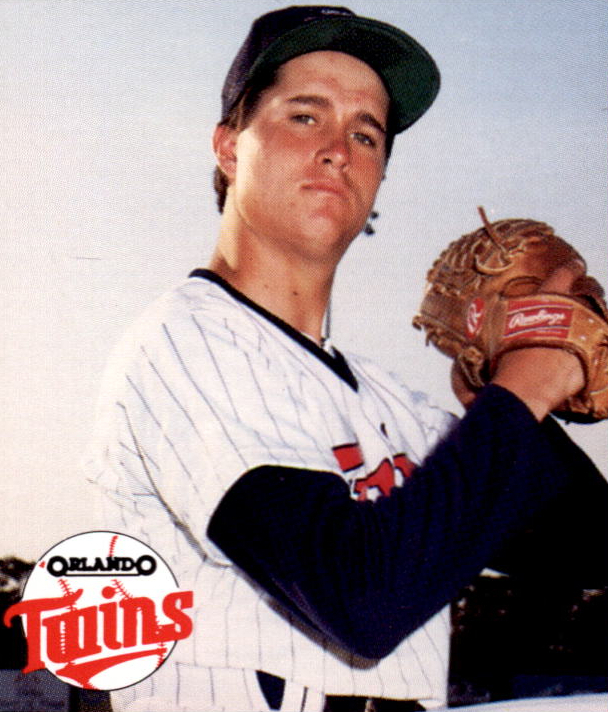
- Casian with the Orlando Twins c. 1988
- Pitcher
- Born: October 28, 1965 (age 59); Lynwood, California, U.S.
- Batted: Right Threw: Left

MLB debut
- September 9, 1990, for the Minnesota Twins

Last MLB appearance
- May 18, 1998, for the Chicago White Sox

MLB statistics
- Win–loss record: 11–13
- Earned run average: 4.56
- Strikeouts: 125
- Stats at Baseball Reference

Teams
- Minnesota Twins (1990–1994); Cleveland Indians (1994); Chicago Cubs (1994–1997); Kansas City Royals (1997); Chicago White Sox (1998)

Lawrence Paul Casian (born October 28, 1965), is an American professional baseball player who pitched in Major League Baseball (MLB) from 1990 to 1998. Casian graduated from Lakewood High School in 1983. Casian was an assistant coach for the baseball team at the University of Portland, he became an area scout for the San Francisco Giants, based in Salem, Oregon, in November.
