= The Baseball Network announcers =

The following is a list of announcers who called Major League Baseball telecasts for the joint venture (lasting for the 1994–1995 seasons) between Major League Baseball, ABC and NBC called The Baseball Network. Announcers who represented each of the teams playing in the respective games were typically paired with each other on regular season Baseball Night in America telecasts. ABC used Al Michaels, Jim Palmer, Tim McCarver and Lesley Visser as the lead broadcasting team. Meanwhile, NBC used Bob Costas, Joe Morgan, Bob Uecker and Jim Gray as their lead broadcasting team.

== Announcers, alphabetically ==
=== A ===
- Joe Angel
- Jack Arute (field reporter for ABC)
- Richie Ashburn

=== B ===
- Johnny Bench (field reporter for NBC, 1994)
- Chris Berman
- Steve Blass
- Bert Blyleven
- Marty Brennaman
- Thom Brennaman
- Steve Busby
- Joe Buck

=== C ===
- Dave Campbell
- Harry Caray
- Skip Caray
- Herb Carneal
- Bob Carpenter
- Rick Cerone
- Tom Cheek
- Gary Cohen
- Jerry Coleman
- Bob Costas

=== D ===
- Rick Dempsey
- Larry Dierker
- Camille Dube

=== E ===
- Dick Enberg

=== F ===
- Ron Fairly
- Mike Flanagan
- Lanny Frattare
- George Frazier

=== G ===
- Joe Garagiola
- George Grande
- Jim Gray (field reporter for NBC)
- Hank Greenwald
- Greg Gumbel (NBC's Baseball Night in America host, 1994)

=== H ===
- Milo Hamilton
- Tom Hamilton
- Tom Hammond
- Ken Harrelson
- Ernie Harwell
- Keith Hernandez
- Jim Hughson
- Al Hrabosky
- Jim Hunter
- Tommy Hutton

=== K ===
- Jim Kaat
- Paul Kennedy
- Bill King
- Harry Kalas
- Duane Kuiper

=== M ===
- Garry Maddox
- Buck Martinez
- Denny Matthews
- Tim McCarver
- Sean McDonough
- Al Michaels
- Jon Miller
- Rick Monday
- Bob Montgomery
- Joe Morgan
- Bobby Murcer
- Bob Murphy
- Brent Musburger

=== N ===
- Dave Niehaus

=== P ===
- Steve Palermo
- Jim Palmer
- Greg Papa
- Steve Physioc

=== R ===
- Claude Raymond
- Jerry Remy
- Ted Robinson
- John Rooney

=== S ===
- Billy Sample
- John Saunders (ABC's Baseball Night in America host)
- Mike Schmidt
- Ken Singleton
- Lary Sorensen
- Paul Splittorff
- Dewayne Staats
- Dick Stockton
- Hannah Storm (field reporter for NBC, 1994; NBC's Baseball Night in America host; 1995)

=== T ===
- Gary Thorne
- Roger Twibell

=== U ===
- Bob Uecker

=== V ===
- Dave Van Horne
- Pete Van Wieren
- Lesley Visser (field reporter for ABC)

=== W ===
- Suzyn Waldman
- John Wathan
- Chris Wheeler
- Ken Wilson

=== Z ===
- Steve Zabriskie

== Baseball Night in America commentator pairings ==
=== 1994 schedule ===
All games aired on ABC; due to the strike NBC was unable to air its slate of games, which were supposed to begin on August 26.

Date	Teams	Play-by-play	Color commentary
July 16	Baltimore at California	Ken Wilson	Bert Blyleven
July 16	Cleveland at Chicago White Sox	Ken Harrelson	Lary Sorensen
July 16	Detroit at Kansas City	Tom Hammond	Tommy Hutton
July 16	Milwaukee at Minnesota	George Grande	George Frazier
July 16	Boston at Oakland	Dick Stockton	Jerry Remy
July 16	New York Yankees at Seattle	Al Michaels	Jim Palmer and Tim McCarver
July 16	Toronto at Texas	Steve Busby	Buck Martinez
July 16	San Francisco at Montréal	Claude Raymond	Camille Dube
July 16	San Diego at New York Mets	Gary Thorne	Bob Murphy
July 16	Los Angeles at Philadelphia	Chris Wheeler	Jim Kaat
July 16	Houston at Pittsburgh	Lanny Frattare	Larry Dierker
July 16	Florida at Atlanta	Pete Van Wieren	Steve Zabriskie
July 16	Chicago Cubs at Cincinnati	Marty Brennaman	Thom Brennaman
July 16	St. Louis at Colorado	Joe Buck	Dave Campbell
July 18	Texas at Cleveland	Tom Hamilton	Steve Busby
July 18	Kansas City at Milwaukee	Tom Hammond	George Frazier
July 18	Minnesota at Toronto	Jim Hughson	Buck Martinez
July 18	Boston at California	Al Michaels	Jim Palmer and Tim McCarver
July 18	Detroit at Chicago White Sox	Ken Harrelson	Lary Sorensen
July 18	New York Yankees at Oakland	Dick Stockton	Dewayne Staats
July 18	Baltimore at Seattle	Jon Miller	Ron Fairly
July 18	San Diego at Montréal	Dave Van Horne	Jerry Coleman
July 18	Los Angeles at New York Mets	Gary Thorne	Jim Kaat
July 18	San Francisco at Philadelphia	Ted Robinson	Garry Maddox
July 18	Atlanta at Pittsburgh	Pete Van Wieren	Steve Blass
July 18	Florida at Cincinnati	Paul Kennedy	Johnny Bench
July 18	Chicago Cubs at Colorado	Steve Physioc	Dave Campbell
July 18	St. Louis at Houston	Joe Buck	Larry Dierker
July 25	Chicago White Sox at Kansas City	Ken Harrelson	Steve Palermo
July 25	Minnesota at Texas	Steve Busby	George Frazier
July 25	Philadelphia at Florida	Chris Wheeler	Mike Schmidt
July 25	Chicago Cubs at Pittsburgh	Steve Physioc	Steve Blass
July 25	New York Mets at St. Louis	Gary Thorne	Al Hrabosky
July 25	Montréal at Atlanta	Pete Van Wieren	Ken Singleton
July 25	Houston at Cincinnati	Brent Musburger	Larry Dierker
July 25	Colorado at San Diego	Jerry Coleman	Dave Campbell
July 25	Los Angeles at San Francisco	Al Michaels	Jim Palmer and Tim McCarver
August 6	Cleveland at Boston	Tom Hamilton	Bob Montgomery
August 6	Baltimore at Milwaukee	Steve Zabriskie	Mike Flanagan
August 6	Detroit at Toronto	Bob Carpenter	Rick Cerone
August 6	Chicago White Sox at California	Ken Harrelson	Bert Blyleven
August 6	Seattle at Kansas City	Dave Niehaus	Billy Sample
August 6	New York Yankees at Minnesota	Al Michaels	Jim Palmer and Tim McCarver
August 6	Texas at Oakland	Dick Stockton	Steve Busby
August 6	San Diego at Chicago Cubs	Steve Physioc	Lary Sorensen
August 6	Florida at New York Mets	Gary Thorne	Bob Murphy
August 6	Montréal at Philadelphia	Dave Van Horne	Garry Maddox
August 6	St. Louis at Pittsburgh	Joe Buck	Steve Blass
August 6	Atlanta at Cincinnati	Brent Musburger	Buck Martinez
August 6	San Francisco at Houston	Ted Robinson	Larry Dierker

=== 1995 schedule ===
==== ABC scheduled games ====
Date	Teams	Play-by-play	Color commentary
July 15	Minnesota at New York Yankees	Al Michaels	Jim Palmer and Tim McCarver
July 15	Kansas City at Baltimore	Gary Thorne	Paul Splittorff
July 15	Oakland at Cleveland	Roger Twibell	Steve Busby
July 15	Milwaukee at Chicago White Sox	Ken Harrelson	John Wathan
July 15	Texas at Boston	Brent Musburger	Joe Torre
July 15	Toronto at Seattle	Chip Caray	Buck Martinez
July 15	Florida at Los Angeles	Joel Meyers	Tommy Hutton
July 15	Cincinnati at Chicago Cubs	Johnny Bench	Keith Hernandez
July 15	Houston at San Francisco	Ted Robinson	Larry Dierker
July 15	Colorado at New York Mets	Bob Murphy	Dave Campbell
July 15	Philadelphia at Montréal	Chris Wheeler	Ken Singleton
July 15	St. Louis at Pittsburgh	Dewayne Staats	Steve Blass
July 15	Atlanta at San Diego	Pete Van Wieren	Joe Garagiola
July 17	Chicago White Sox at New York Yankees	Al Michaels	Jim Palmer and Tim McCarver
July 17	Kansas City at Boston	Brent Musburger	Jim Kaat
July 17	California at Cleveland	Tom Hamilton	Rick Cerone
July 17	Toronto at Minnesota	Jim Hunter	Buck Martinez
July 17	Oakland at Milwaukee	Johnny Bench	Joe Torre
July 17	Baltimore at Texas	Steve Busby	Tommy Hutton
July 17	Detroit at Seattle	Steve Physioc	Ron Fairly
July 17	St. Louis at Montréal	Dave Van Horne	Billy Sample
July 17	New York Mets at Chicago Cubs	Gary Thorne	Keith Hernandez
July 17	Houston at Los Angeles	Joel Meyers	Larry Dierker
July 17	Philadelphia at Colorado	Chris Wheeler	Dave Campbell
July 17	Florida at San Francisco	Ted Robinson	Duane Kuiper
July 17	Cincinnati at San Diego	George Grande	Joe Garagiola
July 24	Cleveland at California	Al Michaels	Jim Palmer and Tim McCarver
July 24	Minnesota at Boston	Bob Kurtz	George Frazier
July 24	New York Yankees at Texas	Steve Busby	Bobby Murcer and Suzyn Waldman
July 24	Milwaukee at Seattle	Steve Physioc	Ron Fairly
July 24	Atlanta at Pittsburgh	Pete Van Wieren	Steve Blass
July 24	Colorado at Philadelphia	Chris Wheeler	Dave Campbell
July 24	New York Mets at Chicago Cubs	Gary Thorne	Tommy Hutton
July 24	Los Angeles at Houston	Joel Meyers	Larry Dierker
July 24	San Francisco at Florida	Paul Kennedy	Duane Kuiper
July 24	San Diego at Cincinnati	Bob Carpenter	Billy Sample
August 5	Boston at Toronto	Dewayne Staats	Buck Martinez
August 5	Chicago White Sox at Cleveland	Ken Harrelson	Joe Torre
August 5	Kansas City at Minnesota	Dave Armstrong	John Wathan
August 5	Milwaukee at Baltimore	Gary Thorne	George Frazier
August 5	New York Yankees at Detroit	Bobby Murcer	Lary Sorensen
August 5	Seattle at Oakland	Roger Twibell	Jerry Remy
August 5	Texas at California	Ken Wilson	Steve Busby
August 5	Atlanta at Montréal	Pete Van Wieren	Ken Singleton
August 5	Chicago Cubs at St. Louis	Steve Zabriskie	Rick Cerone
August 5	Florida at New York Mets	Bob Murphy	Keith Hernandez
August 5	Houston at Pittsburgh	Lanny Frattare	Larry Dierker
August 5	Los Angeles at San Francisco	Al Michaels	Jim Palmer and Tim McCarver
August 5	Philadelphia at Cincinnati	George Grande	Chris Wheeler
August 5	San Diego at Colorado	Steve Physioc	Dave Campbell
August 12	Baltimore at Boston	Dewayne Staats	Bob Montgomery
August 12	California at Minnesota	Ken Wilson	George Frazier
August 12	Cleveland at New York Yankees	Al Michaels	Jim Palmer and Tim McCarver
August 12	Detroit at Milwaukee	Kent Derdivanis	Lary Sorensen
August 12	Baltimore at Chicago White Sox	Ken Harrelson	John Wathan
August 12	Seattle at Kansas City	Dave Niehaus	Paul Splittorff
August 12	Toronto at Texas	Steve Busby	Buck Martinez
August 12	Chicago Cubs at San Francisco	Steve Physioc	Duane Kuiper
August 12	Cincinnati at Florida	Paul Kennedy	George Grande
August 12	Colorado at Atlanta	Pete Van Wieren	Dave Campbell
August 12	Montréal at Philadelphia	Chris Wheeler	Mike Schmidt
August 12	New York Mets at Houston	Bob Murphy	Larry Dierker
August 12	Pittsburgh at Los Angeles	Ted Robinson	Steve Blass
August 12	St. Louis at San Diego	Steve Zabriskie	Jerry Reuss
August 19	Baltimore at Oakland	Dick Stockton	Jerry Reuss
August 19	Boston at Seattle	Dave Niehaus	Bob Montgomery
August 19	Kansas City at Toronto	Dave Armstrong	Buck Martinez
August 19	Detroit at Cleveland	Tom Hamilton	Rick Cerone
August 19	Baltimore at Detroit	Bob Carpenter	Lary Sorensen
August 19	New York Yankees at California	Ken Wilson	Bobby Murcer
August 19	Texas at Chicago White Sox	Ken Harrelson	Steve Busby
August 19	Atlanta at St. Louis	Pete Van Wieren	George Frazier
August 19	Chicago Cubs at Colorado	Al Michaels	Jim Palmer and Tim McCarver
August 19	Florida at Pittsburgh	Paul Kennedy	Steve Blass
August 19	Houston at Cincinnati	George Grande	Larry Dierker
August 19	Los Angeles at New York Mets	Brent Musburger	Jim Kaat
August 19	San Diego at Montréal	Dave Van Horne	Ken Singleton
August 19	San Francisco at Philadelphia	Chris Wheeler	Duane Kuiper

==== NBC scheduled games ====
Date	Teams	Play-by-play	Color commentary
August 25	Baltimore at California	Ken Wilson	John Wathan
August 25	Boston at Oakland	Joel Meyers	Bob Montgomery
August 25	Chicago White Sox at Toronto	Ken Harrelson	Buck Martinez
August 25	Detroit at Cleveland	Bob Costas	Bob Uecker
August 25	Minnesota at Milwaukee	Jim Hunter	George Frazier
August 25	New York Yankees at Seattle	Dave Niehaus	Suzyn Waldman
August 25	Texas at Kansas City	Steve Busby	Paul Splittorff
August 25	Cincinnati at Pittsburgh	George Grande	Steve Blass
August 25	Houston at Florida	Paul Kennedy	Larry Dierker
August 25	Los Angeles at Philadelphia	Greg Gumbel	Joe Morgan
August 25	San Diego at New York Mets	Bob Murphy	Rick Cerone
August 25	San Francisco at Montréal	Duane Kuiper	Ken Singleton
August 25	St. Louis at Colorado	Steve Zabriskie	Dave Campbell
September 1	California at Boston	Bob Costas	Bob Uecker
September 1	Cleveland at Detroit	Tom Hamilton	Lary Sorensen
September 1	Kansas City at Texas	Dave Armstrong	John Wathan
September 1	Milwaukee at Minnesota	Steve Physioc	George Frazier
September 1	Oakland at New York Yankees	Jim Hunter	Keith Hernandez and Suzyn Waldman
September 1	Seattle at Baltimore	Jon Miller	Billy Sample
September 1	Chicago Cubs at Atlanta	Greg Gumbel	Joe Morgan
September 1	Colorado at St. Louis	Joe Buck	Dave Campbell
September 1	Florida at Houston	Paul Kennedy	Larry Dierker
September 1	Montréal at Los Angeles	Dave Van Horne	Jerry Reuss
September 1	New York Mets at San Francisco	Bob Murphy	Duane Kuiper
September 1	Philadelphia at San Diego	Joe Garagiola	Chris Wheeler
September 1	Pittsburgh at Cincinnati	Lanny Frattare	Johnny Bench
September 8	Baltimore at Cleveland	Tom Hamilton	Rick Cerone
September 8	Boston at New York Yankees	Bob Costas	Bob Uecker
September 8	Chicago White Sox at Oakland	Ken Harrelson	Jerry Reuss
September 8	Detroit at Toronto	Gary Thorne	Lary Sorensen
September 8	Kansas City at Seattle	Ron Fairly	Paul Splittorff
September 8	Minnesota at California	Ken Wilson	John Wathan
September 8	Texas at Milwaukee	Steve Busby	Billy Sample
September 8	Atlanta at Florida	Pete Van Wieren	Mike Schmidt
September 8	Cincinnati at Colorado	Greg Gumbel	Joe Morgan
September 8	Houston at Philadelphia	Chris Wheeler	Larry Dierker
September 8	Los Angeles at Pittsburgh	Lanny Frattare	George Frazier
September 8	San Diego at St. Louis	Dewayne Staats	Buck Martinez
September 15	Boston at Cleveland	Tom Hamilton	Bob Montgomery
September 15	Kansas City at California	Bob Costas	Bob Uecker
September 15	Milwaukee at Toronto	Steve Zabriskie	Buck Martinez
September 15	Minnesota at Oakland	Jim Hunter	Paul Splittorff
September 15	New York Yankees at Baltimore	Jon Miller	Bobby Murcer
September 15	Seattle at Chicago White Sox	Ken Harrelson	Ron Fairly
September 15	Texas at Detroit	Steve Busby	Lary Sorensen
September 15	Atlanta at Cincinnati	Greg Gumbel	Joe Morgan
September 15	Chicago Cubs at San Diego	Steve Physioc	Jerry Reuss
September 15	Florida at Colorado	Paul Kennedy	Dave Campbell
September 15	Houston at Montréal	Dave Van Horne	Larry Dierker
September 15	Los Angeles at St. Louis	Joel Meyers	John Wathan
September 15	Philadelphia at New York Mets	Bob Murphy	Rick Cerone
September 15	San Francisco at Pittsburgh	Ted Robinson	Steve Blass
September 22	Baltimore at Milwaukee	Jim Hunter	Rick Cerone
September 22	California at Texas	Bob Costas	Bob Uecker
September 22	Chicago White Sox at Minnesota	Ken Harrelson	George Frazier
September 22	Cleveland at Kansas City	Tom Hamilton	John Wathan
September 22	Detroit at New York Yankees	Bobby Murcer	Lary Sorensen
September 22	Oakland at Seattle	Dave Niehaus	Buck Martinez
September 22	Toronto at Boston	Gary Thorne	Bob Montgomery
September 22	Colorado at San Francisco	Ted Robinson	Dave Campbell
September 22	Cincinnati at Philadelphia	Chris Wheeler	Billy Sample
September 22	Montréal at Atlanta	Pete Van Wieren	Ken Singleton
September 22	New York Mets at Florida	Bob Murphy	Mike Schmidt
September 22	San Diego at Los Angeles	Greg Gumbel	Joe Morgan
September 22	St. Louis at Houston	Steve Zabriskie	Larry Dierker
September 29	Boston at Milwaukee	Bob Kurtz	Jerry Reuss
September 29	Detroit at Baltimore	Gary Thorne	Lary Sorensen
September 29	Kansas City at Cleveland	Tom Hamilton	Paul Splittorff
September 29	New York Yankees at Toronto	Jim Hunter	Buck Martinez
September 29	Oakland at California	Ken Wilson	George Frazier
September 29	Seattle at Texas	Bob Costas	Bob Uecker
September 29	Atlanta at New York Mets	Pete Van Wieren	Rick Cerone
September 29	Cincinnati at Montréal	George Grande	Ken Singleton
September 29	Los Angeles at San Diego	Greg Gumbel	Joe Morgan
September 29	San Francisco at Colorado	Ted Robinson	Dave Campbell

== Postseason ==
=== 1995 Division Series broadcasters ===
==== American League ====
Series	Network	Play-by-play	Color commentary
Seattle Mariners/New York Yankees	NBC (in New York)	Gary Thorne	Tommy Hutton
Seattle Mariners/New York Yankees	ABC (in Seattle)	Brent Musburger	Jim Kaat
Cleveland Indians/Boston Red Sox	NBC (in Cleveland)	Bob Costas	Bob Uecker
Cleveland Indians/Boston Red Sox	ABC (in Boston)	Steve Zabriskie	Tommy Hutton

==== National League ====
Series	Network	Play-by-play	Color commentary
Atlanta Braves/Colorado Rockies	NBC (in Denver)	Pete Van Wieren (Games 1–3); Al Michaels (Game 4)	Larry Dierker (Games 1–3); Jim Palmer and Tim McCarver (Game 4)
Atlanta Braves/Colorado Rockies	ABC (in Atlanta)	Pete Van Wieren (Games 1–3); Al Michaels (Game 4)	Larry Dierker (Games 1–3); Jim Palmer and Tim McCarver (Game 4)
Cincinnati Reds/Los Angeles Dodgers	NBC (in Los Angeles)	Greg Gumbel	Joe Morgan
Cincinnati Reds/Los Angeles Dodgers	ABC (in Cincinnati)	Al Michaels	Jim Palmer and Tim McCarver

=== 1995 League Championship Series broadcasters ===
==== American League ====
Year	Network	Play-by-play	Color commentary
1995	ABC (Games 1–2)	Brent Musburger	Jim Kaat
1995	NBC (Games 3–6)	Bob Costas	Bob Uecker

==== National League ====
Year	Network	Play-by-play	Color commentary
1995	ABC (in Cincinnati)	Al Michaels	Jim Palmer and Tim McCarver
1995	NBC (in Atlanta)	Greg Gumbel	Joe Morgan

=== 1995 World Series broadcasters ===
Year	Network	Play-by-play	Color commentary
1995	ABC (Games 1, 4, 5)	Al Michaels	Jim Palmer and Tim McCarver
1995	NBC (Games 2, 3, 6)	Bob Costas	Joe Morgan and Bob Uecker

== See also ==
- List of World Series broadcasters
- List of American League Division Series broadcasters
- List of National League Division Series broadcasters
- List of Atlanta Braves broadcasters
- List of Baltimore Orioles broadcasters
- List of Boston Red Sox broadcasters
- List of Chicago Cubs broadcasters
- List of Chicago White Sox broadcasters
- List of Cincinnati Reds broadcasters
- List of Cleveland Guardians broadcasters
- List of Colorado Rockies broadcasters
- List of Detroit Tigers broadcasters
- List of Houston Astros broadcasters
- List of Kansas City Royals broadcasters
- List of Los Angeles Angels broadcasters
- List of Los Angeles Dodgers broadcasters
- List of Miami Marlins broadcasters
- List of Milwaukee Brewers broadcasters
- List of Minnesota Twins broadcasters
- List of Montreal Expos broadcasters
- List of New York Mets broadcasters
- List of New York Yankees broadcasters
- List of Oakland Athletics broadcasters
- List of Philadelphia Phillies broadcasters
- List of Pittsburgh Pirates broadcasters
- List of San Diego Padres broadcasters
- List of San Francisco Giants broadcasters
- List of Seattle Mariners broadcasters
- List of St. Louis Cardinals broadcasters
- List of Texas Rangers broadcasters
- List of Toronto Blue Jays broadcasters
