= The Baseball Network =

American short-lived television broadcasting joint venture

- Also known as: Baseball Night in America
- Genre: American baseball game telecasts
- Presented by: Various commentators
- Theme music composer: Scott Schreer
- Country of origin: United States
- Original language: English
- No. of seasons: 2

Production
- Camera setup: Multi-camera
- Running time: 210 minutes or until game ended, (inc. adverts)
- Production companies: Major League Baseball; ABC Sports; NBC Sports

Original release
- Network: ABC; NBC
- Release: July 12, 1994 – October 28, 1995

Related
- Major League Baseball on ABC; Major League Baseball on NBC; MLB Network Showcase

The Baseball Network was an American television broadcasting joint venture between ABC, NBC and Major League Baseball (MLB). Under the arrangement, beginning in the 1994 season, MLB produced its own broadcasts in-house which were then brokered to air on ABC and NBC. The Baseball Network was the first television network in the United States to be owned by a professional sports league.

The package included coverage of games in prime time on selected nights throughout the regular season (under the branding Baseball Night in America), along with coverage of the postseason and the World Series. Unlike previous broadcasting arrangements with the league, there was no national "game of the week" during the regular season; these would be replaced by multiple weekly regional telecasts on certain nights of the week. Additionally, The Baseball Network had exclusive coverage windows; no other broadcaster could televise MLB games during the same night that The Baseball Network was televising games.

The arrangement did not last long; due to the effects of a players' strike on the remainder of the 1994 season, and poor reception from fans and critics over how the coverage was implemented, The Baseball Network was disbanded after the 1995 season. While NBC would maintain rights to certain games, the growing Fox network (having established its own sports division two years earlier in 1994) became the league's new national broadcast partner beginning in 1996.

== Background ==
After the fallout from CBS's financial problems from their exclusive, four-year-long (lasting from 1990 to 1993), US$1.8 billion television contract with Major League Baseball (a contract that ultimately cost CBS approximately $500 million), Major League Baseball decided to go into the business of producing the telecasts themselves and market these to advertisers on its own. In reaction to the failed trial with CBS, Major League Baseball was desperately grasping for every available dollar. To put things into proper perspective, in 1991, the second year of Major League Baseball's contract with CBS, CBS reported a loss of around $169 million in the third quarter of the year. A decline in advertiser interest caused revenue from the sale of commercials during CBS's baseball telecasts to plummet. All the while, CBS was still contractually obligated to pay Major League Baseball around $260 million a year through 1993. Before Major League Baseball decided to seek the services of other networks, CBS offered US$120 million in annual rights fees over a two-year period, as well as advertising revenues in excess of $150 million a season.

As part of MLB's attempt to produce and market the games in-house, it hoped to provide games of regional interests to appropriate markets. Major League Baseball in the process, hoped to offer important games for divisional races to the overall market. Owners also hoped that this particular technique, combined with the additional division races created through league expansion (the Colorado Rockies and Florida Marlins had begun play the year prior) and the quest for wild card spots for the playoffs (1994 was the first year of three divisions for each league and would have been the first year for the wild card) would increase the national broadcast revenue for Major League Baseball in the foreseeable future. On May 28, 1993, Major League Baseball's owners overwhelmingly approved a new network television deal without CBS involved.

After a four-year hiatus, ABC and NBC (who last aired Thursday Night Baseball games and the Saturday afternoon Game of the Week respectively) returned to Major League Baseball under the umbrella of a revenue sharing venture called The Baseball Network. Under a six-year plan (with an option for two additional years), Major League Baseball was intended to receive 85% of the first US$140 million in advertising revenue (or 87.5% of advertising revenues and corporate sponsorship from the games until sales topped a specified level), 50% of the next $30 million, and 80% of any additional money. Prior to this, Major League Baseball was projected to take a projected 55% cut in rights fees and receive a typical rights fee from the networks. When compared to the previous television deal with CBS, The Baseball Network was supposed to bring in 50% less of the broadcasting revenue. The advertisers were reportedly excited about the arrangement with The Baseball Network because the new package included several changes intended to boost ratings, especially among younger viewers.

Arranging broadcasts through The Baseball Network seemed, on the surface, to benefit NBC and ABC (who each contributed $10 million in start-up funds) since it gave them a monopoly on broadcasting Major League Baseball games. The deal was similar to a time-buy, instead of a traditional rights fee situation. It also stood to benefit the networks because they reduced the risk associated with purchasing the broadcast rights outright (in stark contrast to CBS's disastrous contract with Major League Baseball from the 1990–1993 seasons). NBC and ABC were to create a loss-free environment for each other and keep an emerging Fox, which had recently made an aggressive and ultimately successful $1.58 billion bid for the television rights for National Football Conference games (thus, becoming a major player in the sports broadcasting game in the process), at bay. As a result of Fox's NFL gain, CBS was weakened further by affiliate changes, as a number of stations jumped to Fox from CBS (for example, in Detroit, WWJ-TV replaced longtime CBS affiliate WJBK when Fox moved there from WKBD).

Key figures involved in the creation and production for The Baseball Network:

- David Alworth (vice president of broadcasting and production management)
- Dick Ebersol (president of NBC Sports)
- Eddie Einhorn (vice chairman of the Chicago White Sox, television producer and a member of Major League Baseball's television committee)
- John J. Filippelli (coordinating producer)
- Barry Frank (chief television negotiator)
- John Gonzalez (coordinating producer of baseball for NBC Sports)
- Bill Giles (Philadelphia Phillies president and chairman of Major League Baseball's television committee)
- Richard Levin (baseball spokesman)
- Ross Levinsohn
- Jon Litner (vice president of business affairs)
- Jack O'Hara (executive producer of ABC Sports)
- Andy Rosenberg (director of 1995 World Series, NBC Sports)
- Ken Schanzer (president and chief operating officer)
- Bud Selig (owner of the Milwaukee Brewers and acting commissioner of Major League Baseball)
- Ray Stallone (director of marketing communications)
- Dennis Swanson (president of ABC Sports)
- Bill Webb (director of 1995 World Series, ABC Sports)
- Tom Werner (owner of the San Diego Padres and a member of Major League Baseball's television committee)

This wasn't the first time that Major League Baseball considered creating its very own television network. Back in 1988, then commissioner Peter Ueberroth contemplated creating an all-baseball basic cable channel that would show as many as four games each night. Ueberroth wanted to set up a national cable package for one or two nights a week without undercutting the value of some teams' local television deals. This of course, would soon happen when Major League Baseball signed a deal to broadcast games on ESPN, but prior to this, Ueberroth envisioned the owners pooling games already being shown on regional pay-television services. Viewers would see (and pay for) the telecast of the team in their market if a game was scheduled; otherwise, they would be sent games of regional or divisional interest. Eventually, baseball could have also shared the channel with the NHL or NBA in the off-season. It wasn't until January 1, 2009 (nearly 14 years since the cancellation of the Baseball Network) that an all-baseball cable channel, MLB Network (created and backed by MLB) would finally come to fruition and would prove to be much more successful than the ill-fated Baseball Network.

== Coverage ==
The Baseball Network kicked off its coverage on July 12, 1994, on NBC with the All-Star Game from Three Rivers Stadium in Pittsburgh. This was NBC's first telecast of a Major League Baseball game since Game 5 of the 1989 National League Championship Series between the San Francisco Giants and Chicago Cubs on October 9 of that year. The NBC broadcast team consisted of Bob Costas on play-by-play, with Joe Morgan and Bob Uecker as analysts. Costas, a veteran presence at NBC, had been NBC's secondary baseball play-by-play announcer behind Vin Scully during the 1980s. Morgan, who was also working for ESPN at the time, had spent two years at NBC in the mid-1980s and two years at ABC from 1988 to 1989. Uecker, the longtime voice of the Milwaukee Brewers, returned to national television for the first time since he worked for ABC in the 1970s and early 1980s.

Greg Gumbel hosted the pre game show; this was one of his first assignments for NBC after having left CBS Sports following that network's coverage of the 1994 College World Series. Gumbel had also previously served as the secondary play-by-play announcer (behind Sean McDonough) for CBS's baseball coverage, calling the 1993 American League Championship Series along the way with Jim Kaat. Helping with interviews were Hannah Storm (reporting from the American League dugout) and Johnny Bench (reporting from the National League dugout). The 1994 All-Star Game reportedly sold out all its advertising slots. This was considered an impressive financial accomplishment, given that one 30-second spot cost US$300,000.

ABC's primary broadcast team was the same that it had been when the network lost its rights to MLB in 1989. Al Michaels returned as lead broadcaster alongside analysts Tim McCarver, who had joined CBS for its coverage, and Jim Palmer, who had been working as an analyst for his former team, the Baltimore Orioles, in the intervening years.

On the subject of Michaels returning to baseball for the first time since the Loma Prieta earthquake interrupted the 1989 World Series, Jim Palmer said, "Here Al is, having done five games since 1989, and steps right in. It's hard to comprehend how one guy could so amaze."

=== Baseball Night in America ===
The list of dates for Baseball Night in America on ABC and NBC respectively for the 1994 and 1995 seasons.

After the All-Star Game was complete, ABC took over coverage with what was to be their weekly slate of games. ABC was scheduled to televise six regular season games on Saturdays or Mondays in prime time. NBC would then pick up where ABC left off by televising six more regular season Friday night games. Every Baseball Night in America game was scheduled to begin at 8 p.m. Eastern Time (or 8 p.m. Pacific Time if the game occurred on the West Coast). A single starting time gave the networks the opportunity to broadcast one game and then, simultaneously, cut to another game when there was a break in action.

The networks had exclusive rights for the twelve regular season dates, in that no regional or national cable service (such as ESPN or superstations like Chicago's WGN-TV or Atlanta's WTBS) or over-the-air broadcaster was allowed to telecast a Major League Baseball game on those dates. Baseball Night in America (which premiered on July 16, 1994) usually aired up to fourteen games based on the viewers' region (affiliates chose games of local interest to carry) as opposed to a traditional coast-to-coast format. Normally, announcers who represented each of the teams playing in the respective games were paired with each other. More specifically, on regional Saturday night broadcasts and all non-"national" broadcasts, TBN let the two lead announcers from the opposing teams call the games involving their teams together.

Games involving either of the two Canadian-based MLB teams at the time, the Toronto Blue Jays and Montreal Expos, were not always included in the Baseball Night in America package. Canadian rightsholders were allowed to broadcast the games. When TSN (which owned the cable rights to the Blue Jays and Expos) covered the games in Canada, they re-broadcast the BNIA feed across their network. Typically, if the Blue Jays were idle for the day, the Expos would be featured on TSN. Also, CBET (the CBC affiliate in Windsor, Ontario) would air Blue Jays games if the Detroit Tigers were not playing at home that night or if the Blue Jays were scheduled to play in Detroit. Whether or not the game would air in the opposing team's market would depend on which time zone they were from, or if they shared a market with another team.

All of the 1994 games aired on ABC; due to the strike NBC was unable to air its slate of games, which were supposed to begin on August 26.

Hi everyone, and welcome to Baseball Night in America, I'm Al Michaels. And those of us at ABC are delighted to be back in the business of broadcasting baseball for the first time since the 1989 World Series. And it's a brand new concept, we'll have six regular season games on ABC, including tonight and again on Monday night. Then, we'll bring you the Division playoffs in October, part of baseball's new expanded playoff format, and the World Series in late October. Baseball Night in America, a regionalized concept, you'll see a game in your region that's important to those of you in those particular areas. It also gives us the capability of updating games as never before. So sit back, relax, and enjoy the premiere of Baseball Night in America as we take you out to the ballgames.

— ABC's Al Michaels on site at Seattle's Kingdome on the premiere broadcast of Baseball Night in America on July 16, 1994.

=== Postseason coverage ===
In even-numbered years, NBC would have the rights to the All-Star Game and both League Championship Series while ABC would have the World Series and newly created Division Series. In odd-numbered years, the postseason and All-Star Game television rights were supposed to alternate. When ABC and NBC last covered baseball together from 1976 to 1989, ABC had the rights to the World Series in odd-numbered years while NBC would cover the All-Star Game and both League Championship Series in said years. Likewise, this process would alternate in even numbered years, with ABC getting the All-Star Game and both League Championship Series in years that NBC had the World Series.

The networks also promised not to begin any World Series weekend broadcasts after 7:20 p.m. Eastern Time. When CBS held the television rights, postseason games routinely aired on the East Coast at 8:30 p.m. at the earliest. This meant that Joe Carter's dramatic World Series clinching home run in 1993 occurred after midnight in the East. As CBS' baseball coverage progressed, CBS dropped the 8 p.m. pregame coverage (in favor of airing sitcoms such as Evening Shade) before finally starting its coverage at 8:30 p.m. Eastern Time. The first pitch would generally arrive at approximately 8:45 p.m.

ABC won the rights to the first dibs at the World Series in August 1993 after ABC Sports president Dennis Swanson won a coin toss by calling "heads." Ken Schanzer, who was the CEO of The Baseball Network, handled the coin toss. Schanzer agreed to the coin toss by ABC and NBC at the outset as the means of determining the order in which they would divide up the playoffs.

What separated The Baseball Network from previous television deals with Major League Baseball, and was by far the most controversial part of the deal, was that not all postseason games (aside from the World Series) were guaranteed to be shown nationally. To increase viewership by preventing games from being played in the afternoon (the league was the only professional sports league in the country to play postseason games on weekday afternoons), the National League and American League's division and championship series games were instead played simultaneously in primetime, and affiliates could only air one game each night, which were again determined regionally. If one playoff series had already concluded, the remaining games would be aired nationally.

Ken Schanzer, The Baseball Network's president said "We've been given a responsibility to broadcast the games regionally and, within that context, we tried to come up with a plan that makes it as exciting as possible". On that end, The Baseball Network implemented a strategy that included cutting in to one game with highlights from other games—sometimes between batters, and more often, between pitches. Therefore, viewers watching one divisional series or League Championship Series game would often see action continuing on one reduced screen while a clip from another game is shown on another screen and vice versa. The theory was that by inserting highlights, even live action from other games, into the natural lulls, The Baseball Network could produce an exciting, technology-enhanced experience. Despite the frustration of not being able to see both League Championship Series on a national level, the 1995 LCS averaged a 13.1 rating.

Besides the 1994 All-Star Game and Game 6 of the 1995 World Series, arguably, the most famous Baseball Network broadcast was Game 5 of the 1995 American League Division Series between the New York Yankees and the Seattle Mariners, broadcast on ABC. It ended with the Mariners winning in 11 innings (via Edgar Martínez's game winning double), to clinch both their first postseason series win, and their first ever trip to the American League Championship Series. However, because the public would only be permitted to see one postseason game per day, the Division Series between the Mariners and Yankees would only be seen in its entirety by 20% of the country. Meanwhile, 30% could see the Braves-Rockies series, 27% could see the Reds-Dodgers series, and 23% could see the Red Sox-Indians series.

For example, in New York City, WNBC-TV broadcast the first two games of the Yankees-Mariners series, while WABC-TV aired the final three contests. In the neighboring Hartford–New Haven television market in Connecticut, NBC affiliate WVIT aired the first two games of the Boston–Cleveland series, but ABC station WTNH alternated with the Yankees in Game 3, the Red Sox in Game 4, and the Yankees in Game 5.

In Ohio, NBC stations in Cleveland, Steubenville, Columbus, Toledo, and Youngstown would get to see the Red Sox–Indians series. Viewers of WLWT in Cincinnati and all other cities would receive the Reds–Dodgers series. The remaining telecasts, on WSYX, the ABC affiliate in Columbus, would be of the Indians series. In South Dakota, viewers would get the Braves-Rockies series, while North Dakotans would have access to the Red Sox-Indians series. Only about 20% of the country in itself, had access to the 15-inning-long second game of the Mariners-Yankees series.

=== Criticisms ===
A major problem with Baseball Night in America was the idea that viewers could not watch "important" games. Marty Noble put it in perspective by saying "With the Network determining when games will begin and which games are made available to which television markets, Major League Baseball can conduct parts of its pennant races in relative secrecy." What added to the troubles of The Baseball Network was the fact that Baseball Night in America held exclusivity over every market. This most severely impacted markets with two teams, specifically New York City (Mets and Yankees), to the Greater Los Angeles Area (Dodgers and Angels), Chicago (Cubs and White Sox), the San Francisco Bay Area (Giants and Athletics), and to a lesser extent, the state of Texas (Houston Astros and Texas Rangers). For example, if Baseball Night in America showed a Yankees game, this meant that nobody in New York could see that night's Mets game and vice versa.

Furthermore, Chicago's NBC affiliate, WMAQ-TV was unable to televise any Friday night Cubs game from Wrigley Field. Even though Wrigley Field had lights installed and was capable of holding night games since 1988, a city ordinance at the time, prohibited regular season Friday and Saturday night games to be played there. The Baseball Network regardless, owned the broadcasting rights to those entire dates.

Even in markets with only one team, the ABC or NBC affiliate could still not broadcast that team's game if the start time was not appropriate for the time zone. For example, if the Detroit Tigers (the only team in their market) played a road game in Seattle, Oakland or Anaheim beginning at 8 p.m. Pacific Time (a late game), Detroit's Baseball Network affiliate (either WXYZ-TV or WDIV, depending on the network which held the rights to the game) could not air the game because the start time was too late for the Detroit area (11 p.m. Eastern Time). Detroit viewers only had the option of viewing the early game of the night.

Some local broadcasters also objected the policies of The Baseball Network. KSMO-TV in Kansas City, the primary over-the-air station for the Kansas City Royals, went as far as to sue the Royals for breach of contract resulting from their broadcasts being "overexposed" and violating its territorial exclusivity.

Sports Illustrated columnist Tom Verducci for one, was very harsh on The Baseball Network, dubbing it both "America's regional pastime" and an "abomination." ABC Sports president Dennis Swanson, in announcing the dissolution of The Baseball Network, said:

The fact of the matter is, Major League Baseball seems incapable at this point in time, of living with any long term relationships, whether it's with fans, with players, with the political community in Washington, with the advertising community here in Manhattan, or with its TV partners.

While on assignment at the 1993 World Series, CBS Sports broadcaster Sean McDonough told the New York Times that The Baseball Network's strategy of regionalizing the playoffs irked him because with both League Championship Series now being played simultaneously, no market would be able see both games; rather, the two playoff series would be regionalized into areas of natural interest. The only exception would be Games 6 and 7 of the two series, which would have staggered starting times. McDonough said that this would affect out-of-state viewers, for example if the Red Sox were in the playoffs (which would incidentally, actually happen under the watch of The Baseball Network in 1995), then a Boston native located in Atlanta would have missed the games. He also believed that his call of Sid Bream's slide to clinch the National League pennant for the Atlanta Braves in Game 7 of the 1992 National League Championship Series against the Pittsburgh Pirates would have had a lower impact if fans had missed the early part of the game. To put things into further perspective, McDonough believed that even with a staggered starting time from the American League Championship Series game, many fans would not have seen parts of Game 7 of the 1992 NLCS had it been broadcast under The Baseball Network's regionalized plan.

Shortly after the start of the strike, Stanford University's Roger Noll argued that the Baseball Network deal (and the bargain-basement ESPN cable renewal, which went from $100 million to $42 million because of their losses) reflected "poor business judgment on the part of management about the long-run attractiveness of their product to national broadcasters." He added that the $140 million that owners expected to share for the 1994 season (before the strike) from TBN was underestimated by "one-third to one-half" and fell below the annual average of $165 million needed to renew the TBN deal after two years. Meanwhile, Andy Zimbalist, author of Baseball and Billions, and a players' union consulting economist, insisted that baseball could have done better than the TBN deal with some combination of CBS (which offered $120 million last-ditch bid for renewal), Fox and TBS. Baseball shut out CBS and could have waited longer before closing them out."

Five years after The Baseball Network dissolved, NBC Sports play-by-play announcer Bob Costas wrote in his book Fair Ball: A Fan's Case for Baseball that The Baseball Network was "stupid and an abomination." Costas further wrote that the agreement involving the World Series being the only instance of The Baseball Network broadcasting a nationally televised game was an unprecedented surrender of prestige, as well as a slap to all serious fans. He also acknowledged that the most impassioned fans in baseball were now prevented from watching many of the playoff games that they wanted to see, as all playoff games had been broadcast nationally for decades. Costas added that both the divisional series and the League Championship Series now merited scarcely higher priority than regional coverage provided for a Big Ten football game between Wisconsin and Michigan. When Costas was preparing call the 1995 American League Division Series between Boston-Cleveland for NBC, he told the New York Times that "It's baseball's objective to market itself nationally, but TBN makes it a local sport." Costas added "Baseball says the wild card is supposed to save baseball, but TBN shows you as little as possible."

According to Curt Smith's book, The Voice – Mel Allen's Untold Story, the longtime New York Yankees broadcaster and This Week in Baseball host was quoted as saying "You wonder how anything would be worse [than CBS]. What kind of show cancels a twenty-six-week-season's first fourteen weeks?" (in response to TBN's tagline, "Welcome to the Show").

During the 1995 Division Series, the fan frustration with The Baseball Network was so bad that the mere mention of it during the Mariners–Yankees ALDS from public address announcer Tom Hutyler at Seattle's Kingdome brought boos from most of the crowd. To further put things into perspective, 55% of the country was able to get the American League Championship Series (Cleveland-Seattle) while 45% got the National League Championship Series (Atlanta-Cincinnati) for at least the first two games on ABC.

=== Production overview ===
While ABC and NBC would provide some production personnel and their own announcers for the games, all of would be coordinated from the office of Ken Schanzer, the chief executive officer of The Baseball Network and former executive vice president for NBC Sports. The graphics, camera placements, and audio quality were intended on looking and sounding about the same on both networks.

When critiquing The Baseball Network's coverage of the 1995 postseason, Jerry Trecker of the Hartford Courant wrote that the broadcasts suffered from having too many men in the booth, sloppy camera work, and a lack of consistency in graphics. Trecker also felt that the ABC and NBC crews during the World Series, spent too much time in story-telling and not enough in nuts-and-bolts game setup. Instead, the coverage according to Trecker, proceeded as if fans have followed the game with the same attention as in the past. As for the graphics, Trecker argued that not only were the game graphics provided by The Baseball Network not there all the time as was the case with ESPN's, but it was too big.

Trecker would however, praise ABC's production of the 1995 All-Star Game in Arlington. He said that the broadcast crew of Al Michaels, Jim Palmer, and Tim McCarver paced their broadcast as if they had never been away, and the different looks, especially ground level cameras, had always been a trademark of effective work by ABC. ABC also according to him, made effective use of graphics to recap season leaders. ABC Sports' technical coverage as a whole, included 21 cameras from all vantage points, including one in the Goodyear Blimp, and an unmanned camera directly above home plate. Coaches would wear wireless microphones.

Trecker did however, point out that times, the broadcasters seemed to be ahead of the production people, especially when they wanted to talk about Raul Mondesi's speed getting to a drive into the right field corner. They never showed it. Trecker also believed that ABC's usage of dugout reporters (in this case, Lesley Visser, John Saunders, and Rick Dempsey), even in showcase games like the All-Star Game, was overkill. Visser in particular, was singled out for asked such lengthy questions of Los Angeles Dodgers pitcher Hideo Nomo that it was almost farcical when his answers came back in translation.

For the 1995 World Series, ABC and NBC shared 17 cameras and 13 tape machines, two of the "Super Slo-Mo" variety.

=== Sponsorships ===
Among the key sponsors for The Baseball Network were Anheuser-Busch, MCI Inc., Sherwin-Williams, Texaco, and Russell Athletic. The sponsorship with Anheuser-Busch in particular, was worth over $20 million for two years with an option of a third. Budweiser was announced as the presenter during the starting line-up were announcements during The Baseball Network's telecasts. According to Busch Media president Tony Ponturo, Anheuser-Busch liked The Baseball Network's idea of broadcasting games, including the Division Series and League Championship Series regionally instead of to the entire nation all at once.

Other sponsors for The Baseball Network included Gillette, Avis (who paid The Baseball Network approximately $6.5 million), Chevrolet, Fruit of the Loom, Gatorade, General Motors (who was expected to pay The Baseball Network at least $40 million), Upper Deck, and Toyota. Chevrolet in particular, sponsored the "player of the game" award that would be announced towards the end of the telecasts.

All in all, The Baseball Network was said to have more than 20 corporate sponsors and advertisers. In the event of a strike, these sponsors either had the option of taking back the money that they otherwise, would've used to support The Baseball Network and be able to spend it elsewhere or, they would've been able to delay any spending on baseball telecasts until the strike was resolved. At the time of the actual strike's start on August 12, 1994, The Baseball Network was reportedly able to sell approximately $130 million in advertisement time. Unfortunately, about $100 million of that was expected to run through the entire postseason, including the World Series, which would ultimately be canceled on September 14, 1994.

== Downfall and demise ==
The long-term plans for The Baseball Network began to crumble after players and owners went on strike on August 12, 1994. In addition to the cancellation of that year's World Series, ABC was denied its remaining Baseball Night in America telecasts and NBC was shut out of its game broadcast slate (which in 1994, was scheduled to begin on August 26) altogether. It is known that ABC's lead broadcast team of Al Michaels, Jim Palmer, and Tim McCarver were scheduled to broadcast a game between the Chicago Cubs and Los Angeles Dodgers the week that the strike began.

Both networks elected to dissolve the partnership with Major League Baseball on June 22, 1995. Both networks figured that as the delayed 1995 baseball season opened without a labor agreement, there was no guarantee against another strike. Under the terms of the agreement, it could be voided by any party if the venture did not produce a minimum of $330 million in revenue over the first two years.

ABC Sports president Dennis Swanson, in announcing the dissolution of The Baseball Network, said:

The fact of the matter is, Major League Baseball seems incapable at this point in time, of living with any longterm relationships, whether it's with fans, with players, with the political community in Washington, with the advertising community here in Manhattan, or with its TV partners.

Others would argue that a primary reason for its failure was its abandoning of localized markets in favor of more lucrative and stable advertising contracts afforded by turning to a national model of broadcasting, similar to the National Football League's television package, which focuses on localized games, with one or two "national" games.

The Baseball Network's contract stipulated that negotiations could only take place with NBC and ABC for 45 days, starting on August 15, 1995. But with NBC and ABC's refusal to continue after the 1995 season, baseball had to look at its future options. In October 1995, when it was a known fact that ABC and NBC were going to end their television deal/joint venture with Major League Baseball, preliminary talks rose about CBS returning. It was rumored that CBS would show Thursday night games (more specifically, a package of West Coast interleague games scheduled for the 11:30 Eastern/8:30 Pacific Time slot) while Fox would show Saturday afternoon games. CBS and Fox were also rumored to share rights to the postseason. In the end, however, CBS's involvement did not come to pass and NBC became Fox's over-the-air national television partner. Whereas each team earned about $14 million in 1990 under CBS, the later television agreement with NBC and Fox beginning in 1996 earned each team about $6.8 million.

To salvage the remains of the partnership, ABC and NBC elected to share coverage of the 1995 postseason including the World Series. ABC wound up broadcasting Games 1, 4, and 5 of 1995 World Series while NBC would broadcast Games 2, 3, and 6 (which turned out to be the decisive game). Had the 1995 World Series gone to a seventh game, it would have then been broadcast by ABC. Game 5 of the 1995 World Series was the final Major League Baseball game to be broadcast on ABC until the 2020 postseason.

Okay Lesley! So the sixth game on NBC on Saturday. We would have a seventh game here on ABC if it goes to seven in Atlanta. To the strains of "Glory Days"...Springsteen's "Glory Days", it's a glory night in Cleveland. Their Indians win it by a score of 5 to 4. Braves lead the series 3 games to 2. Tonight's game brought to you by Lexus Luxury Automobiles, the result of a relentless pursuit of perfection, Texaco CleanSystem 3 Gasolines, and Budweiser, the gold medal winning American premium lager of the 1995 Great American Beer Festival, this Bud's for you. Al Michaels, Jim Palmer, Tim McCarver, Lesley Visser, John Saunders...saying goodnight...from Jacobs Field...in Cleveland!

— Al Michaels at the end of ABC's coverage of Game 5 of the 1995 World Series, the final Major League Baseball game that would be broadcast on ABC for 25 years.

Al Michaels would later write in his 2014 autobiography You Can't Make This Up: Miracles, Memories, and the Perfect Marriage of Sports and Television that the competition between the two networks could be so juvenile that neither ABC nor NBC wanted to promote each other's telecasts during the 1995 World Series. To give you a better idea, in the middle of Game 1, Michaels was handed a promo that read "Join us here on ABC for Game 4 in Cleveland on Wednesday night and for Game 5 if necessary, Thursday." Michaels however, would soon follow this up by saying "By the way, if you're wondering about Games 2 and 3, I can't tell you exactly where you can see them, but here's a hint: Last night, Bob Costas, Bob Uecker, and Joe Morgan [NBC's broadcast crew] were spotted in Underground Atlanta." Naturally, Bob Costas soon made a similar reference to ABC's crew (Michaels, Jim Palmer, and Tim McCarver) on NBC.

A strange and in a sense, scarred baseball season ends in glory. There were great moments in the postseason. For these two guys, for the folks at ABC too, goodnight!

— NBC's Bob Costas at the end of The Baseball Network's final telecast, Game 6 of the 1995 World Series.

=== Aftermath ===
In the end, the venture lost US$95 million in advertising and nearly $500 million in national and local spending. The Baseball Network generated only about $5.5 million per team in revenue for each of the two years that it operated. To put things into proper perspective, in 1993 alone, CBS generated about $14.7 million per team. Much of this could possibly be traced back to the strike causing a huge drop in revenue, which in return caused baseball salaries to decrease by approximately $140,000 on average in 1995.

Both ABC and NBC soon publicly vowed to cut all ties with Major League Baseball for the remainder of the 20th century, and Fox signed on to be the exclusive network carrier of Major League Baseball regular season games in 1996. However, NBC backtracked and kept a postseason-only schedule — with the exception of even-numbered years when NBC had the rights to the All-Star Game — signing a deal to carry three Division Series games, one of the League Championship Series (the ALCS in even numbered years and the NLCS in odd numbered years; Fox televised the other LCS in said years), and the 1997 and 1999 World Series respectively (Fox had exclusive rights to the 1996, 1998, and 2000 World Series). Beginning in 2001, Fox became the exclusive broadcast network for the World Series.

Fox's end of the new contract (which Fox paid US$575 million for the initial five-year contract) restored the Saturday afternoon Game of the Week broadcasts during the regular season (approximately 16 weekly telecasts annually that normally began on Memorial Day weekend), although it continued to offer a selection of games based on region, with usually three regionalized telecasts airing each week.

With ABC being sold to The Walt Disney Company in 1996, ESPN picked up daytime and late-evening Division Series games with a provision similar to its National Football League games, in which the games would only air on network affiliates in the local markets of the two participating teams. ESPN's Major League Baseball contract was not affected then, but would take a hit in 1998 with the new NFL contract. It was rumored that ABC would only offer Major League Baseball about $10 to $15 million less per year than what CBS was reportedly willing to offer for the 1996 season. At the time, it was reported that Major League Baseball was expecting a combined total of over $900 million in rights fees from two networks.

In 2012, Fox would revive the Baseball Night in America title (previously used for The Baseball Network's games) for a series of Saturday night games. Unlike The Baseball Network, Fox did not carry every game that was scheduled for a given Saturday, only choosing five to six games to distribute to its affiliates.

As far as the primary announce teams for The Baseball Network were concerned, they mostly went their separate ways. Al Michaels remained at ABC until 2006 (his final assignment for ABC Sports was Super Bowl XL), when he moved to NBC to become the voice of their Sunday night NFL coverage. Tim McCarver joined Fox as its primary analyst alongside Joe Buck and stayed there until his retirement from national television broadcasts in 2013 and then called local St. Louis Cardinals broadcasts until 2019. Jim Palmer, meanwhile, would rejoin the Orioles as their television analyst, where he still remains.

NBC's primary crew remained in place for two more years. Bob Uecker would leave following the 1997 World Series, but Bob Costas and Joe Morgan would continue calling games until NBC's contract expired following the 2000 season. NBC's final game at the time, was Game 6 of the 2000 American League Championship Series. Major League Baseball coverage would ultimately return to NBC in 2022 via a deal with the network's streaming service, Peacock. The first game of the agreement, between the Chicago White Sox and the Boston Red Sox at Fenway Park was broadcast nationally on NBC — the first since 2000.

In-house production of MLB telecasts would return in 2009 with the launch of the league-run cable channel MLB Network, which carries a package of regular season games known as the MLB Network Showcase. Costas joined the new channel at launch as a contributor, and calls play-by-play on selected games. MLB Network would later produce the Friday Night Baseball package for Apple TV+.

On July 8, 2011, Michaels and Costas would call an MLB Network Showcase game between the New York Mets and San Francisco Giants together, alternating between play-by-play and color. It was Michaels' first appearance as a primary announcer on a baseball telecast since Game 5 of the 1995 World Series on ABC (as previously mentioned, Michaels had called Games 1, 4 and 5 of that series with Jim Palmer and Tim McCarver, while Costas called Games 2, 3 and 6 with Joe Morgan and Bob Uecker.

On September 28, 2020, it was announced that ABC would carry at least four Wild Card Series games for the expanded 2020 Major League Baseball postseason. Produced by ESPN, they marked ABC's first national MLB broadcasts since 1995. On July 7, 2021, ESPN announced that a Sunday Night Baseball game between the Chicago Cubs and Chicago White Sox on August 8 would air exclusively on ABC. This was the first regular season Major League Baseball game to be aired on ABC since August 19, 1995. Al Michaels made a guest appearance during the broadcast in a remote interview with commentators Matt Vasgersian and Alex Rodriguez

== Announcers ==
As previously mentioned announcers who represented each of the teams playing in the respective games were typically paired with each other during games on regular season Baseball Night in America telecasts. For example, if a game featuring the Texas Rangers playing against the Chicago White Sox aired on Baseball Night in America, then a local Rangers announcer like Steve Busby would announce the broadcast with a local White Sox announcer like Ken "Hawk" Harrelson. In effect, ABC and NBC had to contract many non in-house announcers due to so many games being regionally televised.

Also as previously mentioned, ABC used Al Michaels, Jim Palmer, Tim McCarver, and Lesley Visser as the lead broadcast team (Brent Musburger, CBS alumnus Jim Kaat, and Jack Arute became the secondary team for ABC). Meanwhile, NBC used Bob Costas, Joe Morgan, Bob Uecker, and Jim Gray as their lead broadcasting team. John Saunders was the studio host for ABC's Baseball Night in America coverage. Hannah Storm hosted NBC's studio show for the lone season in which the network was able to participate in The Baseball Network; Greg Gumbel was NBC's studio host for its coverage of the 1994 All-Star Game (as previously mentioned). In 1995, Gumbel became the secondary play-by-play announcer for NBC (working with Joe Morgan on the National League Championship Series) behind Bob Costas. Dick Enberg was supposed to be the secondary play-by-play announcer in 1994 for NBC, but by the following season, his other commitments for NBC such as golf and gridiron football rendered him unavailable to broadcast baseball.

Likewise, the original plan would've called for Costas to work with Uecker and for Enberg to work with Morgan on Baseball Night in America telecasts during the regular season and early round postseason games. When the question aroused regarding why NBC didn't rehire Costas' old broadcast partner, Tony Kubek (for whom Costas worked with on the Game of the Week and NBC's bi-yearly coverage of the ALCS from 1983–1989), it was insinuated that Kubek was simply too independent-minded for NBC officials to tolerate. According to Costas, while he originally wanted to work with Kubek again, NBC simply wanted to go into a different direction after being away from baseball for nearly five years.

Prior to Game 3 of the 1995 World Series, Cleveland Indians slugger Albert Belle unleashed a profanity-laced tirade at NBC reporter Hannah Storm as she was waiting in the Indians' dugout for a prearranged interview with Indians lead-off man, Kenny Lofton. On the same day, Belle snapped at a photographer near the first base line during batting practice. Belle was ultimately fined US$50,000 for his behavior towards Storm. This particular World Series was remembered for baseball television history being made twice by Storm. Prior to Game 2, she became the first female sportscaster to serve as solo host of a World Series game, and after Game 6, she would be the first female sportscaster to preside over the presentation of the Commissioner's Trophy to the World Series champions.

Event	Network	Teams	Play-by-play	Color commentator(s)	Field reporter(s)	Pregame host
1994 Major League Baseball All-Star Game	NBC	Pittsburgh Pirates (host)	Bob Costas	Joe Morgan and Bob Uecker	Hannah Storm and Johnny Bench	Greg Gumbel
1995 Major League Baseball All-Star Game	ABC	Texas Rangers (host)	Al Michaels	Jim Palmer and Tim McCarver	Lesley Visser and Rick Dempsey	John Saunders
1995 American League Division Series	NBC (in New York)	Seattle Mariners/New York Yankees	Gary Thorne	Tommy Hutton		
1995 American League Division Series	ABC (in Seattle)	Seattle Mariners/New York Yankees	Brent Musburger	Jim Kaat	Jack Arute (Game 5)	
1995 American League Division Series	NBC (in Cleveland)	Cleveland Indians/Boston Red Sox	Bob Costas	Bob Uecker		
1995 American League Division Series	ABC (in Boston)	Cleveland Indians/Boston Red Sox	Steve Zabriskie	Tommy Hutton		
1995 National League Division Series	NBC (in Colorado)	Atlanta Braves/Colorado Rockies	Pete Van Wieren (Games 1–3); Al Michaels (Game 4)	Larry Dierker (Games 1–3); Jim Palmer and Tim McCarver (Game 4)		
1995 National League Division Series	ABC (in Atlanta)	Atlanta Braves/Colorado Rockies	Pete Van Wieren (Games 1–3); Al Michaels (Game 4)	Larry Dierker (Games 1–3); Jim Palmer and Tim McCarver (Game 4)		
1995 National League Division Series	NBC (in Los Angeles)	Cincinnati Reds/Los Angeles Dodgers	Greg Gumbel	Joe Morgan		
1995 National League Division Series	ABC (in Cincinnati)	Cincinnati Reds/Los Angeles Dodgers	Al Michaels	Jim Palmer and Tim McCarver		
1995 American League Championship Series	ABC (Games 1–2)	Cleveland Indians/Seattle Mariners	Brent Musburger	Jim Kaat	Jack Arute	
1995 American League Championship Series	NBC (Games 3–6)	Cleveland Indians/Seattle Mariners	Bob Costas	Bob Uecker	Jim Gray	
1995 National League Championship Series	ABC (in Cincinnati)	Atlanta Braves/Cincinnati Reds	Al Michaels	Jim Palmer and Tim McCarver	Lesley Visser	
1995 National League Championship Series	NBC (in Atlanta)	Atlanta Braves/Cincinnati Reds	Greg Gumbel	Joe Morgan		
1995 World Series	ABC (Games 1, 4–5)	Atlanta Braves/Cleveland Indians	Al Michaels	Jim Palmer and Tim McCarver	Lesley Visser	John Saunders
1995 World Series	NBC (Games 2–3, 6)	Atlanta Braves/Cleveland Indians	Bob Costas	Joe Morgan and Bob Uecker	Jim Gray	Hannah Storm

=== Notable calls ===
1995 American League Division Series:

Oh man, oh man, Tony Peña on 3 and 0! Sends everybody home! Tony Peña spells good night! And this team that won 27 games in its final at-bat, that had 48 come-from-behind wins, that was 13–0 in extra inning games...did all those things...when Tony Peña connected.

— Bob Costas, calling the walk-off home run by Tony Peña in Game 1, Cleveland vs. Boston.

(before the pitch) The fans want a dinger out of him...This one by Mattingly, OH HANG ON TO THE ROOF...GOODBYE, HOME RUN! DON MATTINGLY!!!

— Gary Thorne after Don Mattingly's only playoff home run in his last game at Yankee Stadium.

Oh yeah, tie game, Paul O'Neill, GOODBYE into the night of New York!!!!

— Gary Thorne calling Paul O'Neill's game-tying home run off Norm Charlton in Game 2 vs. Mariners.

No balls and a strike to Martinez. Line drive, we are tied! Griffey is coming around! In the corner is Bernie! He's going to try and score! Here's the division championship! Mariners win it, Mariners win it!!!

— Brent Musburger calling the series-winning double by Edgar Martínez.

1995 National League Division Series:

The Braves a strike away from advancing..a half swing and they'll go to Cincinnati for the National League Championship Series.

— Al Michaels, calling the final out, Atlanta vs. Colorado.

1995 American League Championship Series:

The Cleveland Indians, after a 41-year wait, are in the World Series.

— Bob Costas

1995 National League Championship Series:

Wohlers looks...and the strike two pitch to Sanders...a swing and a miss! And the Atlanta Braves have won the 1995 National League pennant! And as you can imagine the celebration begins, down on the natural surface of this ballpark...

— NBC's Greg Gumbel.

1995 World Series:

Back to Georgia!

— Al Michaels calling the final out of Game 5 as the Cleveland Indians won the game; Bob Costas also said this four years later when the New York Mets won Game 5 of the 1999 NLCS.

Dave Justice, all is forgiven in Atlanta.

— Bob Costas after Justice's Game 6 home run which would prove the deciding run.

Left-center field...Grissom, on the run...the team of the '90s has its World Championship!

— Bob Costas calling the final out in Game 6.

== Ratings ==
Ratings for both seasons of the Baseball Night in America regular season coverage were substantially higher than CBS's final season in 1993 (3.8) or any subsequent season on Fox. Baseball Night in America earned a 6.2 during the strike-shortened 1994 season and a 5.8 in 1995.

=== All-Star Game ===
Year	Rating	Share	Households
1994	15.7	28	14,790,000
1995	13.9	25	13,260,000

=== 1995 World Series ===
Rating	Share
19.5	33

== See also ==
- 1994 Major League Baseball All-Star Game
- 1994–95 Major League Baseball strike
  - 1994 World Series
- 1995 Major League Baseball All-Star Game
- 1995 American League Division Series
  - The Double (Seattle Mariners)
- 1995 National League Division Series
- 1995 American League Championship Series
- 1995 National League Championship Series
- 1995 World Series

Preceded by CBS	Major League Baseball network broadcast partner 1994 – 1995	Succeeded by Fox & NBC
