= 1995 Major League Baseball season =

1995 MLB season
- League: Major League Baseball
- Sport: Baseball
- Duration: April 25 – October 28, 1995
- Games: 144
- Teams: 28
- TV partners: The Baseball Network (ABC and NBC); ESPN

Draft
- Top draft pick: Darin Erstad
- Picked by: California Angels

Regular Season
- Season MVP: AL: Mo Vaughn (BOS); NL: Barry Larkin (CIN)

Postseason
- AL champions: Cleveland Indians
- AL runners-up: Seattle Mariners
- NL champions: Atlanta Braves
- NL runners-up: Cincinnati Reds

World Series
- Champions: Atlanta Braves
- Runners-up: Cleveland Indians
- World Series MVP: Tom Glavine (ATL)

MLB seasons
- ← 1994 1996 →

Locations of teams for the 1994–1996 American League seasons
West Central East
Locations of teams for the 1995–1996 National League seasons
West Central East

The 1995 Major League Baseball season was the first season to be played under the expanded postseason format, as the League Division Series (LDS) was played in both the American and National leagues for the first time, since the 1981 strike-split season. However, due to the 1994–95 Major League Baseball strike which carried into the 1995 season, a shortened 144-game schedule commenced on April 25, when the Florida Marlins played host to the Los Angeles Dodgers.

The Atlanta Braves became the first franchise to win World Series championships for three cities. Along with their 1995 title, the Braves won in 1914 as the Boston Braves, and in 1957 as the Milwaukee Braves.

== Regular season ==
After the 1994 season was ended due to the players' strike, there was still a deal that had to be worked out. However, it wasn't until major league owners parlayed plans to have replacement players play in 1995 that the players got into serious negotiations. Due to the strike, there was no official defending champion for the year. However, the negotiations pushed the start of the season back to late April, already 18 games into a regular season.

Despite the strike, which alienated many fans, Baltimore Orioles shortstop Cal Ripken Jr. surpassed Lou Gehrig's consecutive games played streak when he played in his 2,131st straight game on September 6. Games during the playoffs were also broadcast simultaneously, meaning that games were broadcast only regionally. Despite the oddities, the 1995 season is now considered a financial success where the two best teams in baseball (in their leagues) met up in the World Series, the Cleveland Indians and Atlanta Braves. For the first time since 1954, the Indians were the AL representatives in the World Series. This came on the heels of dominating the AL Central (beating second place Kansas City by 30 games).

They met the Boston Red Sox, who had AL MVP Mo Vaughn (39 home runs, 126 RBI) and got home-field advantage in the series. Regardless, Cleveland swept the Red Sox. Meanwhile, in the other ALDS series between Seattle and the Yankees, the Yankees stormed out to a quick 2–0 series lead at Yankee Stadium, winning game 2 on a 15th inning walk-off home run by Jim Leyritz. However, as the series shifted to The Kingdome in Seattle, the Mariners, who had made a 13-game comeback on the California Angels to force a one-game playoff (in which the Mariners' ace Randy Johnson got the win), the Mariners won games 3 and 4 to cause a classic game 5, in which the Mariners came back three times to win on Edgar Martínez's famous double that scored Joey Cora and Ken Griffey Jr. In the ALCS, the Mariners surprised the Indians by taking game 1, however on the power of pitchers Dennis Martínez and Orel Hershiser, the Indians managed to knock off Seattle in 6.

In the NLDS, it was the near-opposite to the New York/Seattle series. The Cincinnati Reds, who'd run away with the NL Central, swept the Dodgers while the Atlanta Braves took both games vs. Colorado at Coors Field before the Rockies finally won a game in Game 3. The Braves, however, finished off the Rockies at home in Game 4. Then, in the NLCS, after taking both games at Riverfront Stadium, the Braves finished the sweep of the Reds at home.

In the 1995 World Series, the Braves took the first two at home vs. Cleveland. Then, during the three games at Jacobs Field, the Indians won games 3 and 5 but those wins were sandwiched around the Braves 5–2 Game 4 victory. In Game 6, the Braves, on the power of an 8-inning one-hitter thrown by Tom Glavine, and David Justice hitting a solo home run in the sixth inning, won 1–0 and won the World Series. The victory made the Braves the first team to win World Series in three home cities (Boston (1914), Milwaukee (1957), and Atlanta (1995)).

== Statistical leaders ==
Statistic	American League		National League	
AVG	Edgar Martínez SEA	.356	Tony Gwynn SD	.368
HR	Albert Belle CLE	50	Dante Bichette COL	40
RBI	Albert Belle CLE; Mo Vaughn BOS	126	Dante Bichette COL	128
Wins	Mike Mussina BAL	19	Greg Maddux ATL	19
ERA	Randy Johnson SEA	2.48	Greg Maddux ATL	1.63
SO	Randy Johnson SEA	294	Hideo Nomo LAD	236
SV	José Mesa CLE	46	Randy Myers CHC	38
SB	Kenny Lofton CLE	54	Quilvio Veras FLA	56

== Standings ==
=== American League ===
AL East
Team	W	L	Pct.	GB	Home	Road
Boston Red Sox	86	58	.597	—	42‍–‍30	44‍–‍28
New York Yankees	79	65	.549	7	46‍–‍26	33‍–‍39
Baltimore Orioles	71	73	.493	15	36‍–‍36	35‍–‍37
Detroit Tigers	60	84	.417	26	35‍–‍37	25‍–‍47
Toronto Blue Jays	56	88	.389	30	29‍–‍43	27‍–‍45

AL Central
Team	W	L	Pct.	GB	Home	Road
Cleveland Indians	100	44	.694	—	54‍–‍18	46‍–‍26
Kansas City Royals	70	74	.486	30	35‍–‍37	35‍–‍37
Chicago White Sox	68	76	.472	32	38‍–‍34	30‍–‍42
Milwaukee Brewers	65	79	.451	35	33‍–‍39	32‍–‍40
Minnesota Twins	56	88	.389	44	29‍–‍43	27‍–‍45

AL West
Team	W	L	Pct.	GB	Home	Road
Seattle Mariners	79	66	.545	—	46‍–‍27	33‍–‍39
California Angels	78	67	.538	1	39‍–‍33	39‍–‍34
Texas Rangers	74	70	.514	4½	41‍–‍31	33‍–‍39
Oakland Athletics	67	77	.465	11½	38‍–‍34	29‍–‍43

=== National League ===
NL East
Team	W	L	Pct.	GB	Home	Road
Atlanta Braves	90	54	.625	—	44‍–‍28	46‍–‍26
New York Mets	69	75	.479	21	40‍–‍32	29‍–‍43
Philadelphia Phillies	69	75	.479	21	35‍–‍37	34‍–‍38
Florida Marlins	67	76	.469	22½	37‍–‍34	30‍–‍42
Montreal Expos	66	78	.458	24	31‍–‍41	35‍–‍37

NL Central
Team	W	L	Pct.	GB	Home	Road
Cincinnati Reds	85	59	.590	—	44‍–‍28	41‍–‍31
Houston Astros	76	68	.528	9	36‍–‍36	40‍–‍32
Chicago Cubs	73	71	.507	12	34‍–‍38	39‍–‍33
St. Louis Cardinals	62	81	.434	22½	39‍–‍33	23‍–‍48
Pittsburgh Pirates	58	86	.403	27	31‍–‍41	27‍–‍45

NL West
Team	W	L	Pct.	GB	Home	Road
Los Angeles Dodgers	78	66	.542	—	39‍–‍33	39‍–‍33
Colorado Rockies	77	67	.535	1	44‍–‍28	33‍–‍39
San Diego Padres	70	74	.486	8	40‍–‍32	30‍–‍42
San Francisco Giants	67	77	.465	11	37‍–‍35	30‍–‍42

- The Seattle Mariners defeated the California Angels in a one-game playoff to earn the AL West division title.

== Postseason ==
=== Bracket ===
Division Series (ALDS, NLDS)
West	Seattle	3
WC	NY Yankees	2
American League
Central	Cleveland	3
East	Boston	0
East	Atlanta	3
WC	Colorado	1
National League
Central	Cincinnati	3
West	Los Angeles	0

League Championship Series (ALCS, NLCS)
West	Seattle	2
Central	Cleveland	4
East	Atlanta	4
Central	Cincinnati	0

World Series
AL	Cleveland	2
NL	Atlanta	4

== Awards and honors ==
- Baseball Hall of Fame
  - Richie Ashburn
  - Leon Day
  - William Hulbert
  - Mike Schmidt
  - Vic Willis

Baseball Writers' Association of America Awards
BBWAA Award	National League	American League
Rookie of the Year	Hideo Nomo (LA)	Marty Cordova (MIN)
Cy Young Award	Greg Maddux (ATL)	Randy Johnson (SEA)
Manager of the Year	Don Baylor (COL)	Lou Piniella (SEA)
Most Valuable Player	Barry Larkin (CIN)	Mo Vaughn (BOS)
Gold Glove Awards
Position	National League	American League
Pitcher	Greg Maddux (ATL)	Mark Langston (CAL)
Catcher	Charles Johnson (FLA)	Iván Rodríguez (TEX)
First Baseman	Mark Grace (CHC)	J. T. Snow (CAL)
Second Baseman	Craig Biggio (HOU)	Roberto Alomar (TOR)
Third Baseman	Ken Caminiti (SD)	Robin Ventura (CWS)
Shortstop	Barry Larkin (CIN)	Omar Vizquel (CLE)
Outfielders	Marquis Grissom (ATL)	Kenny Lofton (CLE)
Outfielders	Raúl Mondesí (LAD)	Devon White (TOR)
Outfielders	Steve Finley (SD)	Ken Griffey Jr. (SEA)
Silver Slugger Awards
Pitcher/Designated Hitter	Tom Glavine (ATL)	Edgar Martínez (SEA)
Catcher	Mike Piazza (LAD)	Iván Rodríguez (TEX)
First Baseman	Eric Karros (LAD)	Mo Vaughn (BOS)
Second Baseman	Craig Biggio (HOU)	Chuck Knoblauch (MIN)
Third Baseman	Vinny Castilla (COL)	Gary Gaetti (KC)
Shortstop	Barry Larkin (CIN)	John Valentin (BOS)
Outfielders	Sammy Sosa (CHC)	Albert Belle (CLE)
Outfielders	Dante Bichette (COL)	Tim Salmon (CAL)
Outfielders	Tony Gwynn (SD)	Manny Ramirez (CLE)

=== Other awards ===
- Outstanding Designated Hitter Award: Edgar Martínez (SEA)
- Roberto Clemente Award (Humanitarian): Ozzie Smith (STL)
- Rolaids Relief Man Award: José Mesa (CLE, American); Tom Henke (STL, National)

=== Player of the Month ===
Month	American League	National League
May	Manny Ramirez	Matt Williams
June	Edgar Martínez	Jeff Conine
July	Garret Anderson	Dante Bichette
August	Albert Belle	Mike Piazza
September	Albert Belle	Dante Bichette

=== Pitcher of the Month ===
Month	American League	National League
May	Kenny Rogers	Heathcliff Slocumb
June	Kevin Appier	Hideo Nomo
July	Tim Wakefield	Greg Maddux
August	Erik Hanson	Sid Fernandez
September	Norm Charlton	Greg Maddux

== Managers ==
=== American League ===
Team	Manager	Notes
Baltimore Orioles	Phil Regan	
Boston Red Sox	Kevin Kennedy	
California Angels	Marcel Lachemann	
Chicago White Sox	Gene Lamont, Terry Bevington	
Cleveland Indians	Mike Hargrove	Won American League Pennant
Detroit Tigers	Sparky Anderson	
Kansas City Royals	Bob Boone	
Milwaukee Brewers	Phil Garner	
Minnesota Twins	Tom Kelly	
New York Yankees	Buck Showalter	
Oakland Athletics	Tony La Russa	
Seattle Mariners	Lou Piniella	AL Manager of the Year
Texas Rangers	Johnny Oates	
Toronto Blue Jays	Cito Gaston	

=== National League ===
Team	Manager	Notes
Atlanta Braves	Bobby Cox	Won World Series
Chicago Cubs	Jim Riggleman	
Cincinnati Reds	Davey Johnson	
Colorado Rockies	Don Baylor	NL Manager of the Year
Florida Marlins	Rene Lachemann	
Houston Astros	Terry Collins	
Los Angeles Dodgers	Tommy Lasorda	
Montreal Expos	Felipe Alou	
New York Mets	Dallas Green	
Philadelphia Phillies	Jim Fregosi	
Pittsburgh Pirates	Jim Leyland	
St. Louis Cardinals	Joe Torre, Mike Jorgensen	
San Diego Padres	Bruce Bochy	
San Francisco Giants	Dusty Baker	

== Home field attendance and payroll ==
Team name	Wins	%±	Home attendance	%±	Per game	Est. payroll	%±
Colorado Rockies	77	45.3%	3,390,037	3.3%	47,084	$34,154,717	43.0%
Baltimore Orioles	71	12.7%	3,098,475	22.2%	43,034	$43,942,521	13.1%
Cleveland Indians	100	51.5%	2,842,745	42.5%	39,483	$38,057,835	24.8%
Toronto Blue Jays	56	1.8%	2,826,483	−2.8%	39,257	$50,590,000	16.5%
Los Angeles Dodgers	78	34.5%	2,766,251	21.4%	38,420	$39,273,201	3.4%
Atlanta Braves	90	32.4%	2,561,831	0.9%	35,581	$47,235,445	−4.3%
Boston Red Sox	86	59.3%	2,164,410	21.9%	30,061	$32,455,518	−14.3%
Philadelphia Phillies	69	27.8%	2,043,598	−10.8%	28,383	$30,555,945	−3.3%
Texas Rangers	74	42.3%	1,985,910	−20.7%	27,582	$34,581,451	4.9%
Chicago Cubs	73	49.0%	1,918,265	4.0%	26,643	$29,505,834	−18.7%
Cincinnati Reds	85	28.8%	1,837,649	−3.2%	25,523	$43,144,670	5.0%
St. Louis Cardinals	62	17.0%	1,756,727	−5.9%	24,399	$37,101,000	26.7%
California Angels	78	66.0%	1,748,680	15.6%	24,287	$31,223,171	24.1%
New York Yankees	79	12.9%	1,705,263	1.8%	23,360	$48,874,851	6.2%
Florida Marlins	67	31.4%	1,700,466	−12.2%	23,950	$24,515,781	13.3%
Seattle Mariners	79	61.2%	1,643,203	48.8%	22,510	$36,481,311	24.8%
Chicago White Sox	68	1.5%	1,609,773	−5.2%	22,358	$46,961,282	19.8%
Houston Astros	76	15.2%	1,363,801	−12.6%	18,942	$34,169,834	3.2%
Montreal Expos	66	−10.8%	1,309,618	2.6%	18,189	$12,473,000	−34.7%
New York Mets	69	25.5%	1,273,183	10.6%	17,683	$27,674,992	−10.6%
San Francisco Giants	67	21.8%	1,241,500	−27.2%	17,243	$36,462,777	−14.5%
Kansas City Royals	70	9.4%	1,233,530	−11.9%	17,132	$29,532,834	−27.2%
Detroit Tigers	60	13.2%	1,180,979	−0.3%	16,402	$37,044,168	−10.6%
Oakland Athletics	67	31.4%	1,174,310	−5.5%	16,310	$37,739,225	10.4%
Milwaukee Brewers	65	22.6%	1,087,560	−14.3%	15,105	$17,798,825	−26.9%
Minnesota Twins	56	5.7%	1,057,667	−24.4%	14,690	$25,410,500	−10.6%
San Diego Padres	70	48.9%	1,041,805	9.2%	14,470	$26,382,334	76.9%
Pittsburgh Pirates	58	9.4%	905,517	−25.9%	12,577	$18,355,345	−24.2%

== Television coverage ==
This was the second and final season of The Baseball Network, the joint venture between MLB, ABC and NBC. Meanwhile, ESPN continued to air Sunday Night Baseball and Wednesday Night Baseball.

The long-term plans for The Baseball Network began to crumble after the 1994–95 Major League Baseball strike began on August 12, 1994, forcing the cancellation of the rest of the 1994 regular season, the postseason, and that year's World Series, Both networks elected to dissolve the partnership with Major League Baseball on June 22, 1995. Both networks figured that as the delayed 1995 baseball season opened without a labor agreement, there was no guarantee against another strike. Under the terms of the agreement, it could be voided by any party if the venture did not produce a minimum of $330 million in revenue over the first two years.

ABC and NBC were able to air their full respective slates of 1995 Baseball Night in America regular season games. To salvage the remains of the partnership, ABC and NBC elected to share coverage of the 1995 postseason including the World Series. MLB would then replace The Baseball Network with new deals with NBC and Fox beginning in 1996.

=== Domestic ===
Network	Day of week	Announcers
ABC	Saturday nights Monday nights	Al Michaels, Jim Palmer, Tim McCarver, Brent Musburger, Jim Kaat See also: The Baseball Network announcers
NBC	Friday nights	Bob Costas, Joe Morgan, Bob Uecker, Greg Gumbel See also: The Baseball Network announcers
ESPN	Sunday nights Wednesday nights	Jon Miller, Joe Morgan See also: List of ESPN Major League Baseball broadcasters

=== International ===
Country	Network
Asia	Prime Sports
Australia	Nine Network
Canada	CBC, CTV, TSN, SRC, RDS
Japan	NHK
Latin America	ESPN
South Korea	MBC
United Kingdom	Sky Sports

== Events ==
=== January–June ===
- April 2 – After 232 days, the 1994–95 Major League Baseball strike comes to an end.
- April 8 – The Colorado Rockies sign free agent outfielder Larry Walker.
- April 25 – Major League Baseball begins its strike-shortened 144-game season. Opening day games see fan protests regarding the strike spill onto the field. In addition, there were boos at opening day games.
- April 26 – The Colorado Rockies open Coors Field with an 11–9 victory over the New York Mets in 14 innings.
- June 30 – Eddie Murray of the Cleveland Indians became the 20th member of the 3,000-hit club with a single in the sixth inning against the Minnesota Twins.

=== July–September ===
- July 11 – The National League defeats the American League in the All-Star Game 3–2, on an 8th-inning pinch-hit home run by Jeff Conine. Conine becomes the 10th player to homer in his first All-Star at bat, and is named the Game's MVP. Frank Thomas, Craig Biggio and Mike Piazza also connect for home runs.
- August 10 – The Los Angeles Dodgers are forced to forfeit to the visiting St. Louis Cardinals when inebriated fans react to several close calls by throwing souvenir baseballs onto the field. No Major League Baseball game has resulted in a forfeit since.
- August 18 – St. Louis' Tom Henke achieved his 300th career save against Atlanta.
- September 4 – Robin Ventura of the Chicago White Sox becomes the eighth player in major league history to hit two grand slams in a single game, doing so in the 4th and 5th innings of the White Sox 14–3 win over the Texas Rangers. The last to do it was Frank Robinson in 1970.
- September 6 – Cal Ripken Jr. of the Baltimore Orioles plays in his 2,131st consecutive major league game to surpass Lou Gehrig's 56-year record. When the game becomes official in the middle of the fifth inning, Ripken takes a victory lap around Camden Yards during the 22-minute standing ovation from the sellout crowd, including President Bill Clinton. In the game, Ripken goes 2-for-4, including a home run, in Baltimore's 4–2 win over California.
- September 28 – Greg A. Harris of the Montreal Expos becomes the first major league pitcher since 1893 to pitch with both hands in one game. Harris faces four batters, two from his usual right side and two from the left, in the ninth inning of a 9–7 loss to the Cincinnati Reds.

=== October–December ===
- October 23 – The St. Louis Cardinals hire Tony La Russa as their manager.
- October 28 – In a pitchers' duel, the Atlanta Braves win Game 6 of the World Series 1–0, on a combined one-hitter by Tom Glavine and Mark Wohlers. David Justice's sixth-inning home run accounts for the game's only run. In winning, the Braves become the first team to win World Championships representing three cities – Boston (1914), Milwaukee (1957) and Atlanta. Catcher Tony Peña's leadoff single in the 6th is Cleveland's only hit. Glavine is named Series MVP.
- November 2 – The New York Yankees name Joe Torre as their new manager, replacing Buck Showalter.
- December 22 – Anheuser-Busch agrees to sell the Cardinals for $150 million to an investment group that agrees to keep the team in St. Louis.
- December 22 – The Florida Marlins sign free agent pitcher Kevin Brown. The Philadelphia Phillies sign free agent third baseman Todd Zeile. The Boston Red Sox sign free agent pitcher Jamie Moyer.

== Undated events ==
- Greg Maddux won his 4th consecutive Cy Young Award, a record at the time (has since been equaled by Randy Johnson)
- The Cleveland Indians' Albert Belle became the first player with 50 home runs and 50 doubles in the same season.
- The Cleveland Indians clinch the AL Central on the 123rd game of the season, the quickest a team ever clinched a division.

== Deaths ==
- January 2 – Don Elston, 65, All-Star relief pitcher for the Cubs who led NL in appearances in 1958 and 1959.
- January 12 – John "Hi" Simmons, 89, coach at Missouri from 1937 to 1973 who won the 1954 College World Series.
- January 18 – Ron Luciano, 57, American League umpire from 1968 to 1980 known for his flamboyance and several books.
- February 7 – Cecil Upshaw, 52, relief pitcher, mainly for the Atlanta Braves, who saved 27 games in 1969 but missed the next season after nearly severing a finger.
- March 5 – Roy Hughes, 84, infielder for four teams who scored 112 runs for 1936 Indians.
- March 13 – Leon Day, 78, All-Star pitcher for the Newark Eagles of the Negro leagues who was elected to the Hall of Fame just six days earlier; set several league strikeout marks, including 18 strikeouts in one game.
- March 29 – Terry Moore, 82, All-Star center fielder for the Cardinals who batted .304 in 1940, captained 1942 and 1946 champions.
- April 9 – Bob Allison, 60, All-Star outfielder for the Senators/Twins who was the 1959 Rookie of the Year, had three 30-HR seasons and led the AL in triples and runs once each.
- May 7 – Gus Bell, 66, All-Star outfielder, mainly with the Reds, who had four 100-RBI seasons and led the NL in triples in 1951; oldest in a major league family that includes son Buddy and grandson David.
- May 30 – Glenn Burke, 42, center fielder for the Dodgers and Athletics who was the first former major leaguer to publicly acknowledge his homosexuality.
- June 9 – Zoilo Versalles, 55, Cuban All-Star shortstop who led Twins to the 1965 AL pennant; first Latin American player to be named MVP, led AL in triples three times and in doubles and runs once each.
- June 10 – Lindsey Nelson, 76, broadcaster for the Mets from 1962 to 1979, and also for the San Francisco Giants and NBC.
- July 27 – Rick Ferrell, 89, Hall of Fame catcher for the Browns, Red Sox and Senators whose 1806 games caught were an AL record until 1988; from 1934 to 1938, half of a battery with brother Wes.
- August 3 – Harry Craft, 80, manager of the Houston Colt .45s in their 1962 debut; former Reds center fielder also managed the Kansas City Athletics and Chicago Cubs.
- August 4 – Dick Bartell, 87, All-Star shortstop for five teams, known for his combative personality, who batted .300 five times and scored 100 runs three times; batted .381 for Giants in 1936 World Series.
- August 13 – Mickey Mantle, 63, Hall of Fame center fielder for the Yankees who was the AL's MVP in 1956, 1957 and 1962 and won the 1956 Triple Crown; 16-time All-Star won four home run titles, hitting 50 twice, and retired with third most HRs (536) and walks (1733) in history; 10-time .300 hitter led AL in runs six times; most powerful switch-hitter in baseball history, with career marks for runs (1677), RBI (1509) and slugging percentage (.557), and successor to Babe Ruth and Joe DiMaggio as symbol of the Yankees' long reign; hit record 18 home runs in World Series play.
- August 20 – Von McDaniel, 56, pitcher who joined his brother Lindy on the 1957–58 St. Louis Cardinals, winning seven games.
- September 21 – Tony Cuccinello, 87, All-Star second baseman for five teams who lost the 1945 batting title by one point in his final season; later a coach.
- September 21 – Andrew Rozdilsky, 77, who performed as Andy the Clown at White Sox games from 1960 to 1990.
- October 21 – Vada Pinson, 57, twice a National League All-Star outfielder; finished his career with 2,757 hits in 18 seasons.
- December 27 – Oscar Judd, 87, Canadian pitcher who was an American League All-Star in 1943.
