= 1995 World Series =

91st edition of Major League Baseball's championship series

Team (Wins)	Managers	Season
Atlanta Braves (4)	Bobby Cox	90–54 (.625), GA: 21
Cleveland Indians (2)	Mike Hargrove	100–44 (.694), GA: 30
- Dates: October 21–28
- Venue(s): Fulton County Stadium (Atlanta); Jacobs Field (Cleveland)
- MVP: Tom Glavine (Atlanta)
- Umpires: Harry Wendelstedt (NL, crew chief), Jim McKean (AL), Bruce Froemming (NL), John Hirschbeck (AL), Frank Pulli (NL), Joe Brinkman (AL)
- Hall of Famers: Braves: Bobby Cox (manager); John Schuerholz (GM); Tom Glavine; Chipper Jones; Greg Maddux; Fred McGriff; John Smoltz; Indians: Eddie Murray; Jim Thome; Dave Winfield (DNP)

Broadcast
- Television: ABC (Games 1, 4, 5); NBC (Games 2, 3, 6)
- TV announcers: Al Michaels, Jim Palmer, and Tim McCarver (ABC); Bob Costas, Joe Morgan, and Bob Uecker (NBC)
- Radio: CBS; WSB (ATL); WKNR (CLE)
- Radio announcers: Vin Scully and Jeff Torborg (CBS); Skip Caray, Pete Van Wieren, Don Sutton, and Joe Simpson (WSB); Herb Score and Tom Hamilton (WKNR)
- ALCS: Cleveland Indians over Seattle Mariners (4–2)
- NLCS: Atlanta Braves over Cincinnati Reds (4–0)

The 1995 World Series was the championship series of Major League Baseball's (MLB) 1995 season. The 91st edition of the World Series, it was a best-of-seven playoff played between the National League (NL) champion Atlanta Braves and the American League (AL) champion Cleveland Indians. It was the first World Series after the previous year's Series was canceled due to a players' strike. The Braves upset the heavily favored Indians in six games to capture their third World Series championship in franchise history (along with 1914 in Boston and 1957 in Milwaukee), making them the first team to win in three different cities. This was the first major professional sports championship ever won by an Atlanta-based team. As of 2026, this is the last time the Braves won the World Series at home.

Five of the six games of the series were won by one run, including the clinching sixth game, a 1–0 combined one-hitter by Tom Glavine and Mark Wohlers.

This was the first time since the LCS changed to a best-of-seven format that a winner of a LCS via a sweep had gone on to win the World Series. This has since been repeated in 2019 by the Washington Nationals, in 2022 by the Houston Astros, in 2025 by the Los Angeles Dodgers, and in 2026 by the Milwaukee Brewers.

This World Series, despite being in an odd-numbered year, opened in the NL home because of the omission of the 1994 World Series. Until 2003, the World Series began in the AL home in even-numbered years.

== Background ==
=== Atlanta Braves ===
After losing the World Series in 1991 to the Minnesota Twins and in 1992 to the Toronto Blue Jays, the Atlanta Braves were making their third attempt in four years (not counting the 1994 strike) to capture Atlanta's first title.

The Braves overcame some early inconsistency to win their division by 21 games. In the playoffs, which featured a new first round, the Braves overwhelmed the third-year Colorado Rockies, then swept the Cincinnati Reds in the NLCS (spoiling an all-Ohio World Series in the process; notably, prior to their World Series appearance in 1948, the Indians had spoiled an all-Boston World Series by beating the Red Sox in a one-game playoff). The team relied on clutch hitting and its powerful pitching rotation, which was made up of perennial Cy Young Award winner Greg Maddux, Tom Glavine, John Smoltz, and Steve Avery.

As the NL champion, they opened this World Series at home because there was no 1994 World Series.

=== Cleveland Indians ===
After decades of futility, the city of Cleveland finally had a winner in town. The Indians dominated the American League in 1995, winning 100 of their 144 games (their 100–44 record yielded a very high 0.694 winning percentage, which was, at the time, the highest regular season winning percentage in Major League Baseball since 1954, and is, as of 2015, the 12th highest regular season winning percentage in Major League Baseball history since 1900). Furthermore, in just 144 games, they won the AL Central by 30 games, and they performed the difficult feat of leading their league in both team batting average (0.291) and ERA (3.81). Thanks to their hitting and bullpen, this Indians team became known around the league for their ability to come back from many deficits, often in dramatic fashion; of their 100 regular season victories, 48 were come-back victories, 27 came in their last at-bat, eight came by way of "walk off" home runs, and 13 were extra-inning victories (they were 13–0 in extra-inning games). After this dominance of the AL in the regular season, the Indians, in the playoffs, swept the Boston Red Sox in the opening round, then held off Ken Griffey Jr. and the red hot Seattle Mariners in the ALCS, before heading into the Series against the Braves.

The 1995 Cleveland Indians featured a very impressive batting line-up; one that hit for high average, good power, and had good speed. In addition to leading the AL in batting average (0.291), the Indians in 1995 also led the American League in runs scored (840; 5.83 runs per game), home runs (207), and stolen bases (132). Led by speedsters Kenny Lofton and Omar Vizquel, along with Carlos Baerga at the top of the order, the Indians offense was powered in the middle of the order by Albert Belle, Eddie Murray, Manny Ramírez, and Jim Thome; at the bottom of the line-up could be found Paul Sorrento (or Herbert Perry) and Sandy Alomar Jr. (or Tony Peña). Thus, this Indians line-up had six everyday players who finished the season with a batting average of at least .300; and, with Herbert Perry and Tony Peña frequently filling in for Paul Sorrento and Sandy Alomar Jr., respectively, it was not uncommon for the Tribe to field a line-up with as many as eight players who finished the season with a batting average of at least .300. In terms of power, though the '95 season was shortened, nevertheless, the Indians' line-up still featured two players with at least 30 HR, five players with at least 20 HR, and seven with at least 10 HR. While this line-up was filled with star players (four, in fact, were named to the 1995 AL All-Star team, namely, Lofton, Baerga, Belle, and Ramirez), Albert Belle stood out among all of them in 1995. Powered by a very strong second half of the season, Belle, the Indians' clean-up hitter in 1995, finished 1995 with a .317 batting average, 126 RBI, and 50 home runs. Further to be noted is the fact that, in hitting 50 HR and 52 doubles in 1995, Belle became the first Major League player to hit at least 50 home runs and at least 50 doubles in the same season (an accomplishment which, again, is even more remarkable considering that he did this in a shortened, 144-game season).

The Indians also led the 1995 AL in ERA (3.81). While their starting pitching—led by veterans Dennis Martínez and Orel Hershiser—was respectable, it was their bullpen which gave real strength to their pitching staff. Key members of their bullpen staff included veteran right-hander Eric Plunk (6–2, 2.67 ERA), veteran left-hander Paul Assenmacher (6–2, 2.82), the young right-handed set-up man, Julián Tavárez (10–1, 2.44 ERA), and right-handed closer, José Mesa (3–0, 1.12 ERA, 46 SV). Mesa, in his first year as closer, posted a league-leading 46 saves in 1995, and set a then-Major League record of 38 consecutive saves without a blown save. Two of the members of the 1995 Indians' pitching staff—Dennis Martínez (the team's ace) and José Mesa—were named to the 1995 AL All-Star team.

This marked the first time a Cleveland-based team was playing for a major professional sports championship since the Cleveland Browns made the 1965 NFL Championship Game.

== Series build-up ==
It might be noted that this was the first time that a team from Cleveland and one from Atlanta faced each other in the World Series, there were years, prior to the Braves being in Atlanta, in which the Braves faced a Cleveland team for baseball's crown. In 1948, the Boston Braves faced the Cleveland Indians (with the Indians winning that Series in six games). Even before that, in 1892, the Boston Beaneaters, a forerunner of the Braves, were also National League Champions in 1892, and faced the Cleveland Spiders for the championship. The Beaneaters beat the Spiders that year to win that baseball championship.

The 1995 World Series was also noted for large-scale protests by Native American activists in response to the controversy surrounding both clubs' usage of Native American-themed nicknames, logos and mascots, as well as the use of the tomahawk chop by Braves fans.

== Broadcasting ==
NBC was originally scheduled to televise the entire World Series; however, due to the cancellation of the 1994 World Series, which had been slated for ABC (who last televised a World Series in 1989), coverage ended up being split between NBC and ABC. Game 5 would be the last Major League Baseball game to be telecast by ABC for 25 years. Had the World Series lasted all seven games, the last game would have been televised by ABC. ABC was scheduled to televise up to four wild card games in the 2020 MLB Postseason.

This was the only World Series to be produced under The Baseball Network umbrella (a revenue sharing joint venture between Major League Baseball, ABC and NBC). In July 1995, NBC and ABC announced that they would be pulling out of what was supposed to be a six-year-long venture. NBC would next cover the 1997 (NBC's first entirely since 1988) and 1999 World Series over the course of a five-year-long contract, in which Fox would cover the World Series in even numbered years (1996, 1998 and 2000).

Game 5 would be the last Major League game Al Michaels called as a full-time baseball announcer. After that, Michaels would work NFL games full-time for three networks: ABC, NBC, and Amazon Prime. Michaels did call baseball again in a 2011 regular season game between the New York Mets and the San Francisco Giants on MLB Network, partnering with his erstwhile NBC counterpart Bob Costas.

Also during the World Series in 1995, NBC's Hannah Storm not only became the first woman to serve as solo pre-game host of a World Series (CBS' Andrea Joyce co-hosted with Pat O'Brien in 1993) but also became the first woman to preside over a World Series Trophy presentation. Storm was the recipient of a profane outburst from Albert Belle in his team's dugout. Later, Belle was unrepentant: "The Indians wanted me to issue a statement of regret when the fine was announced, but I told them to take it out. I apologize for nothing." John Saunders served as pre-game host for ABC's coverage. Serving as field reporters for the series were Lesley Visser (ABC) and Jim Gray (NBC).

The six games averaged a national Nielsen rating of 19.5 and a share of 33. Through 2016, this remains the highest-rated World Series of the post-strike era.

On the radio side, CBS was the national broadcaster with Vin Scully and Jeff Torborg on the call. Locally, WKNR aired the series in Cleveland with Herb Score and Tom Hamilton announcing, while WSB broadcast the series in Atlanta with Skip Caray, Pete Van Wieren, Don Sutton, and Joe Simpson announcing.

=== International ===
Country	Network
Asia	Prime Sports
Australia	Nine Network
Canada	CBC, CTV, SRC
Japan	NHK
Latin America	ESPN
South Korea	MBC
United Kingdom	Sky Sports

== Summary ==
NL Atlanta Braves (4) vs. AL Cleveland Indians (2)

Game	Date	Score	Location	Time	Attendance
1	October 21	Cleveland Indians – 2, Atlanta Braves – 3	Atlanta–Fulton County Stadium	2:37	51,876
2	October 22	Cleveland Indians – 3, Atlanta Braves – 4	Atlanta–Fulton County Stadium	3:17	51,877
3	October 24	Atlanta Braves – 6, Cleveland Indians – 7 (11)	Jacobs Field	4:09	43,584
4	October 25	Atlanta Braves – 5, Cleveland Indians – 2	Jacobs Field	3:14	43,578
5	October 26	Atlanta Braves – 4, Cleveland Indians – 5	Jacobs Field	2:33	43,595
6	October 28	Cleveland Indians – 0, Atlanta Braves – 1	Atlanta–Fulton County Stadium	3:01	51,875

== Matchups ==
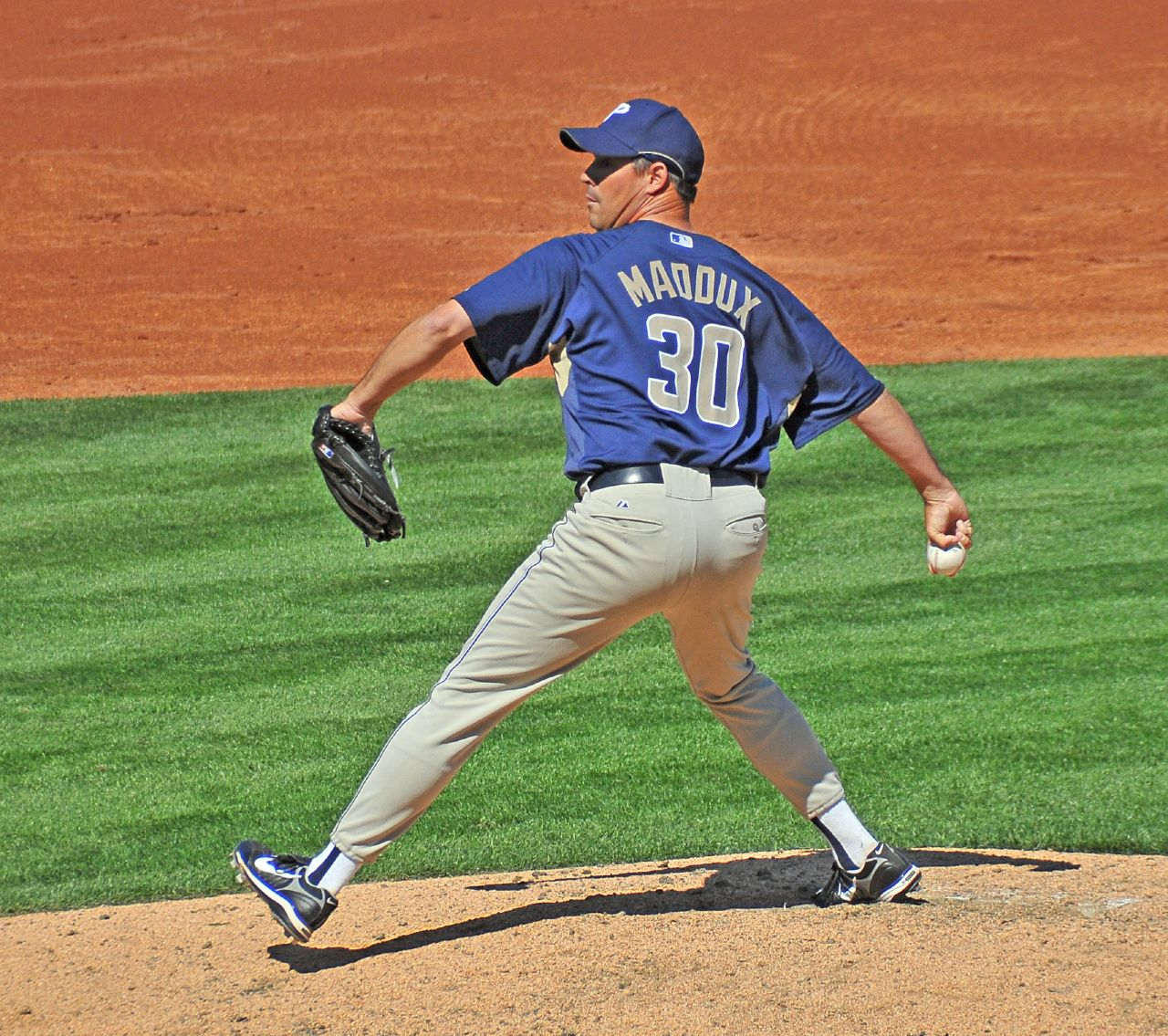
Greg Maddux, the winning pitcher in Game 1.

=== Game 1 ===
October 21, 1995 7:20 pm (EDT) at Atlanta–Fulton County Stadium in Atlanta, Georgia 55 °F (13 °C), Clear
Team	1	2	3	4	5	6	7	8	9	R	H	E
Cleveland	1	0	0	0	0	0	0	0	1	2	2	0
Atlanta	0	1	0	0	0	0	2	0	X	3	3	2
WP: Greg Maddux (1–0) LP: Orel Hershiser (0–1); Home runs: CLE: None; ATL: Fred McGriff (1); Attendance: 51,876; Boxscore

Braves ace Greg Maddux pitched a two-hit complete game victory in his first World Series appearance (and just the 15th two-hitter in World Series history).

The Indians scored in the first inning when Kenny Lofton reached on an error, stole second and third, and scored on an RBI groundout by Carlos Baerga. In the bottom of the second, Fred McGriff launched a tape measure home run on his first ever World Series pitch off Indians starter Orel Hershiser to even the score at 1–1. Both starters settled down until the seventh, when Hershiser and the Indians' bullpen walked the first three Braves to open the inning. The Braves would take a 3–1 lead after Luis Polonia hit into a run-scoring force play and Rafael Belliard bunted a perfect suicide squeeze. Lofton scored the Indians another run in the ninth to cut the Braves lead to a single run, (both Indians runs resulted from errors and were thus, unearned) but Baerga lifted a pop fly that third baseman Chipper Jones grabbed near the visiting dugout to end the game.

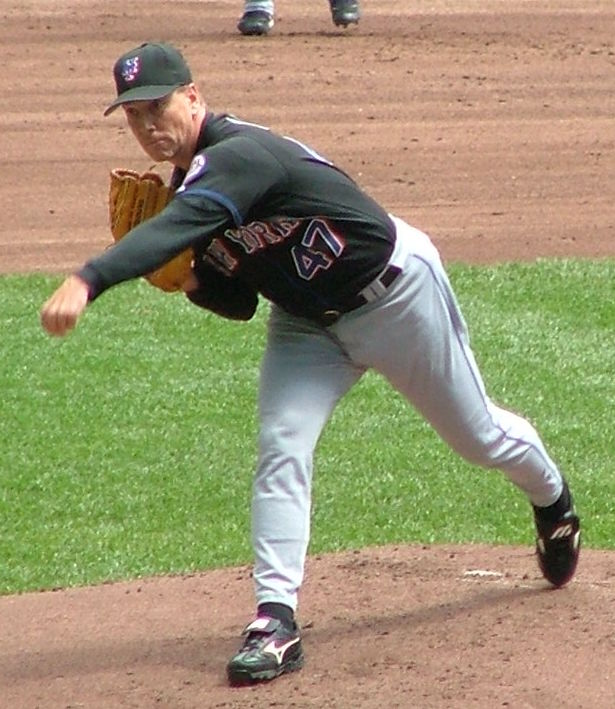
Tom Glavine, the winning pitcher in Game 2.

=== Game 2 ===
October 22, 1995 7:20 pm (EDT) at Atlanta–Fulton County Stadium in Atlanta, Georgia 63 °F (17 °C), Clear
Team	1	2	3	4	5	6	7	8	9	R	H	E
Cleveland	0	2	0	0	0	0	1	0	0	3	6	2
Atlanta	0	0	2	0	0	2	0	0	X	4	8	2
WP: Tom Glavine (1–0) LP: Dennis Martínez (0–1) Sv: Mark Wohlers (1); Home runs: CLE: Eddie Murray (1); ATL: Javy López (1); Attendance: 51,877; Boxscore

Braves No. 2 starter Tom Glavine got the win in Game 2, aided by a big sixth-inning home run by catcher Javy López, who also picked Manny Ramirez off first base at a crucial moment in the eighth inning to erase a potential game-tying baserunner. The Indians had taken an early 2–0 lead on an Eddie Murray two-run home run after Albert Belle got on base, but the Braves evened the score in the third with a sacrifice fly by Chipper Jones and an RBI single by David Justice. Lopez launched his home run in the sixth inning from Indians starter Dennis Martínez. The Braves' bullpen held off the Indians in the later innings despite allowing a run in the seventh, and Mark Wohlers earned the save, giving the Braves a 2–0 series lead.

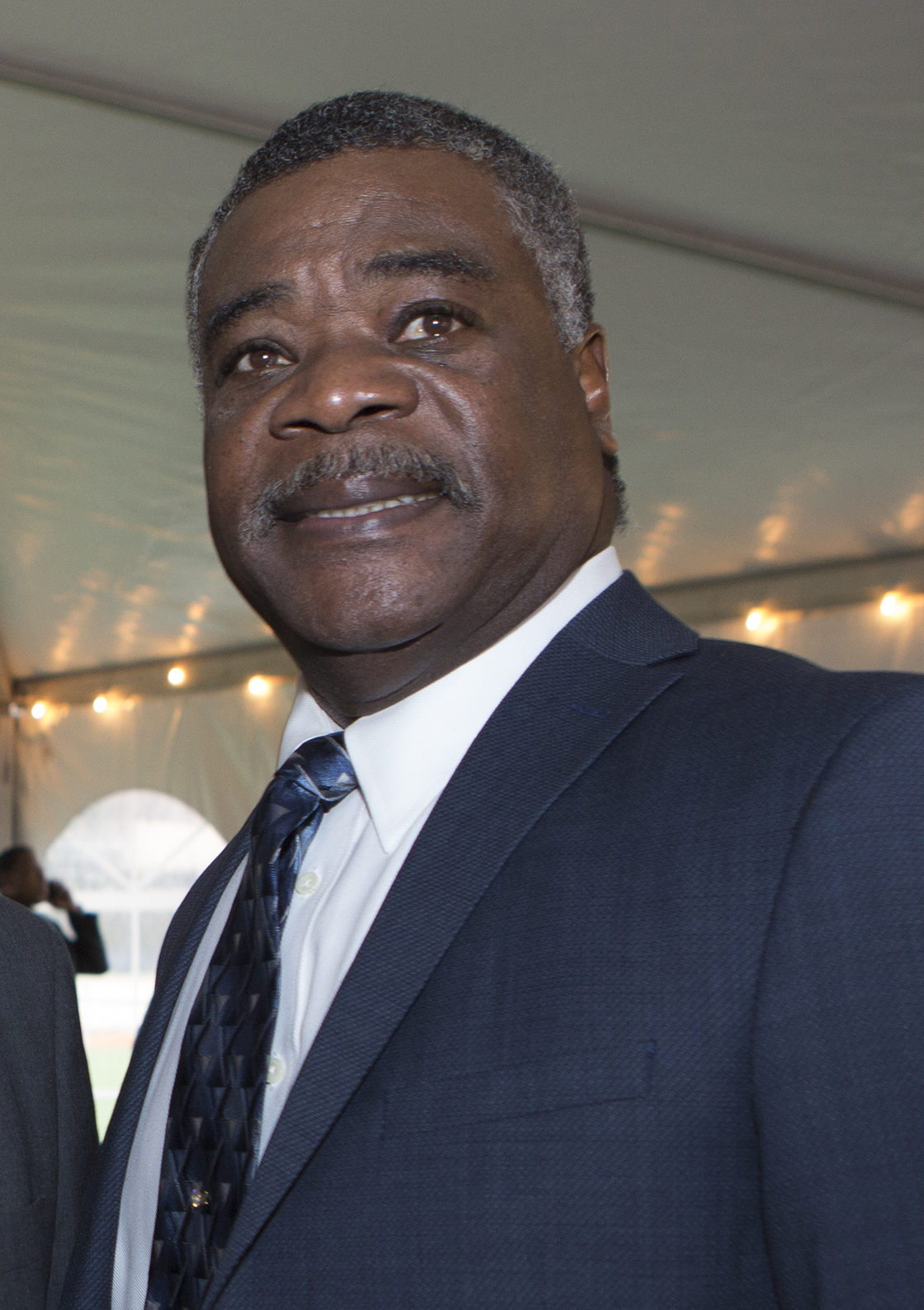
Eddie Murray hit a walk off single in the bottom of the eleventh inning to give the Indians their first win of the series.

=== Game 3 ===
October 24, 1995 8:20 pm (EDT) at Jacobs Field in Cleveland, Ohio 48 °F (9 °C), Overcast
Team	1	2	3	4	5	6	7	8	9	10	11	R	H	E
Atlanta	1	0	0	0	0	1	1	3	0	0	0	6	12	1
Cleveland	2	0	2	0	0	0	1	1	0	0	1	7	12	2
WP: José Mesa (1–0) LP: Alejandro Peña (0–1); Home runs: ATL: Fred McGriff (2), Ryan Klesko (1); CLE: None; Attendance: 43,584; Boxscore

With the World Series moving to smaller, raucous Jacobs Field in Cleveland, the Indians got their first win. The Indians offense got back on track off Atlanta starter John Smoltz. With the Indians already down 1–0 in the bottom of the first, Kenny Lofton singled to center and scored on Omar Vizquel's triple into the right field corner. Omar then scored the go-ahead run when Carlos Baerga grounded out. In the third, the Indians were back at it again when Lofton opened the inning by ripping a double into the right-center field gap. Omar then got a bunt single and Baerga singled to left to drive in Lofton. Albert Belle then rolled a grounder up the middle to score Vizquel to make it 4–1. This was Smoltz's only early exit and only poor start in eight career World Series appearances. The Braves got a boost, however, when reliever Brad Clontz induced a double play groundout by Manny Ramírez to escape further damage. Home runs by Fred McGriff and Ryan Klesko brought the Braves closer at 4–3. The Indians added a run in the seventh on another RBI hit by Baerga scoring Lofton (who would reach base in all six of his plate appearances). With a 5–3 lead going into the eighth, trouble brewed for the Indians when Charles Nagy and the bullpen gave up the lead. Marquis Grissom led off with a double off the wall. Polonia singled through the right side to drive in Grissom, sending Nagy to the showers. Chipper Jones walked, McGriff hit a deep fly moving the runners up a base, and David Justice reached when Baerga booted his groundball, subsequently allowing Polonia to score the tying run. The inning was capped off by Mike Devereaux's RBI single giving the Braves a 6–5 lead. The Braves couldn't hold on to their slim lead either as Sandy Alomar Jr. laced a game-tying double inside the line at first in the bottom of the eighth. The two closers, Mark Wohlers and José Mesa then matched zeros for the next two innings. In the 11th, the Braves went to Alejandro Peña. Baerga immediately smashed a double and after an intentional walk to Belle, veteran Eddie Murray singled to center, scoring pinch runner Álvaro Espinoza and cutting the Braves' World Series lead in half.

A record 18 pitchers were used between the Braves and Indians in Games 2 and 3.

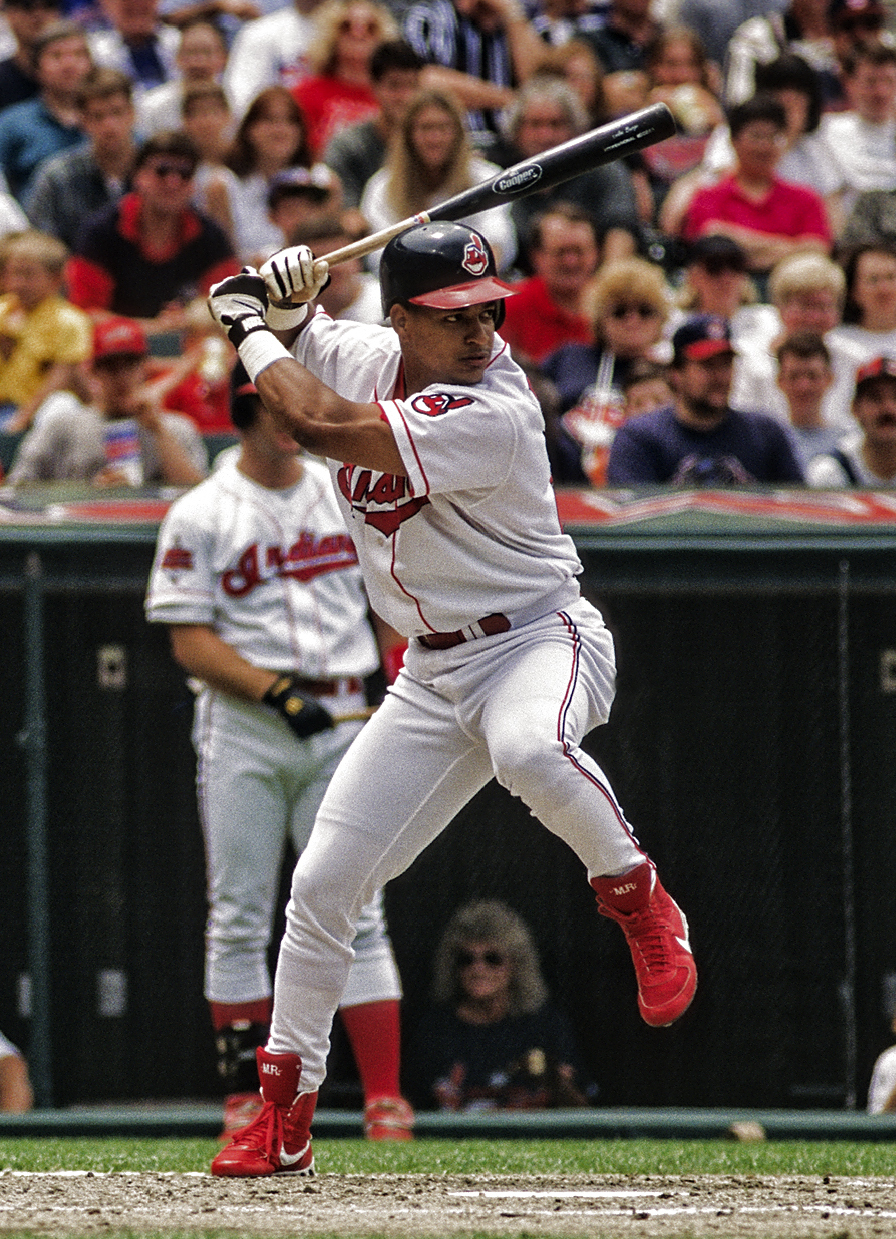
Manny Ramirez hit his first World Series home run in Game 4.

=== Game 4 ===
October 25, 1995 8:20 pm (EDT) at Jacobs Field in Cleveland, Ohio 46 °F (8 °C), Partly Cloudy
Team	1	2	3	4	5	6	7	8	9	R	H	E
Atlanta	0	0	0	0	0	1	3	0	1	5	11	1
Cleveland	0	0	0	0	0	1	0	0	1	2	6	0
WP: Steve Avery (1–0) LP: Ken Hill (0–1) Sv: Pedro Borbón Jr. (1); Home runs: ATL: Ryan Klesko (2); CLE: Albert Belle (1), Manny Ramírez (1); Attendance: 43,578; Boxscore

Braves manager Bobby Cox controversially decided to start left-handed pitcher Steve Avery in the critical Game 4 instead of coming back with Greg Maddux. Despite Avery's uncharacteristically poor regular season showing (7-13, 4.67 ERA), Cox felt he deserved a chance after having won the NLCS clincher against the Cincinnati Reds throwing six shutout innings. Young Braves outfielder Ryan Klesko hit a sixth-inning home run to give the Braves the lead. This would be the last time a player would hit home runs in back-to-back World Series games until 2016. Avery again delivered six effective innings, only giving up a sixth-inning home run to Indians slugger Albert Belle. A controversial play happened when Eddie Murray hit a pitch over third base; left-field umpire Jim McKean called it foul while third-base umpire Harry Wendelstedt looked at Jim McKean to make the call. Murray eventually walked and reached second on a balk by Avery, but Herbert Perry struck out to end the inning. The Braves promptly broke the tie with a three-run seventh, with David Justice batting in two of the runs with a single. An RBI double by Javy López gave the Braves an insurance run, making it 5–1. Reliever Pedro Borbón Jr. saved the 5–2 win after Mark Wohlers ran into trouble, and the Braves were one victory away from a title.

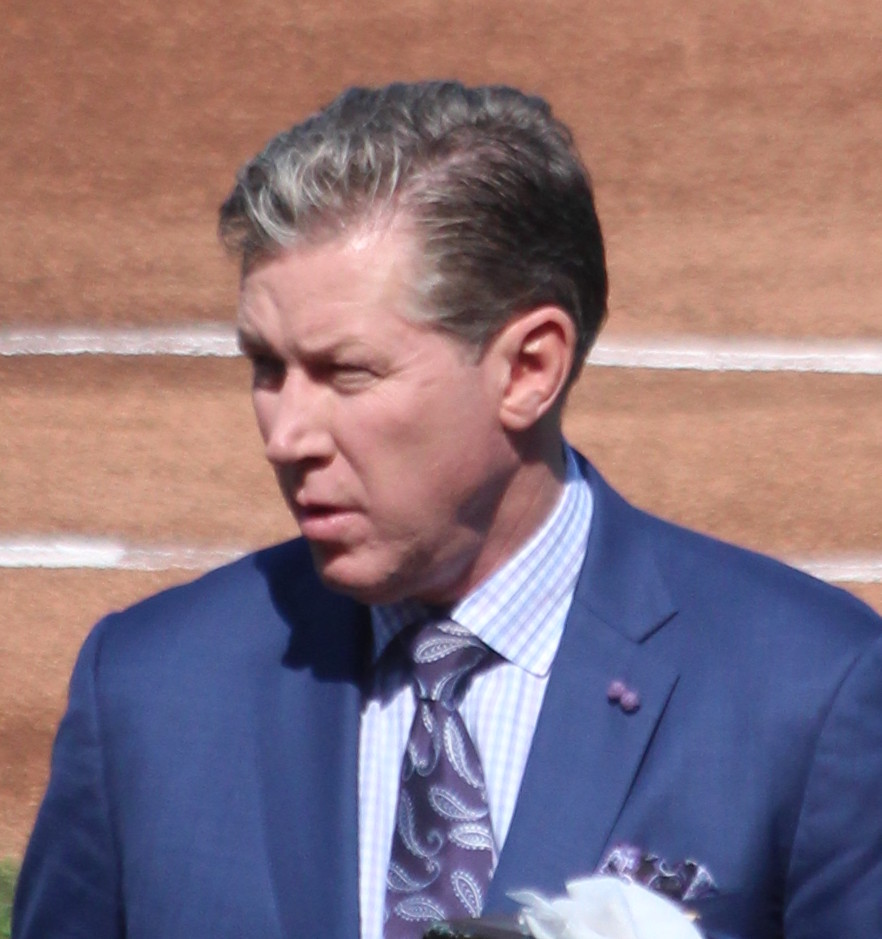
Orel Hershiser, the winning pitcher in Game 5.

=== Game 5 ===
October 26, 1995 8:20 pm (EDT) at Jacobs Field in Cleveland, Ohio 52 °F (11 °C), Overcast
Team	1	2	3	4	5	6	7	8	9	R	H	E
Atlanta	0	0	0	1	1	0	0	0	2	4	7	0
Cleveland	2	0	0	0	0	2	0	1	X	5	8	1
WP: Orel Hershiser (1–1) LP: Greg Maddux (1–1) Sv: José Mesa (1); Home runs: ATL: Luis Polonia (1), Ryan Klesko (3); CLE: Albert Belle (2), Jim Thome (1); Attendance: 43,595; Boxscore

It seemed the perfect situation for the Braves with Greg Maddux pitching Game 5 with a chance to clinch the title, but Albert Belle slugged a two-run homer in the first inning, and the Braves lineup was held in check by Indians veteran Orel Hershiser who went eight innings, only surrendering two runs. Luis Polonia hit a solo home run into the fourth and the Braves actually tied the game at 2–2 with a run-scoring infield single by Marquis Grissom in the fifth, but the Indians got two more runs from Maddux making it 4–2. Jim Thome hit an insurance home run in the eighth, which proved necessary as Ryan Klesko homered in his third consecutive game, reducing the gap to 5–4. Klesko became the first person to homer in three consecutive World Series road games, by belting homers in Games 3, 4, and 5. The win sent the World Series back to Atlanta.

As previously mentioned, this game was the most recent baseball game that ABC televised until the 2020 postseason.

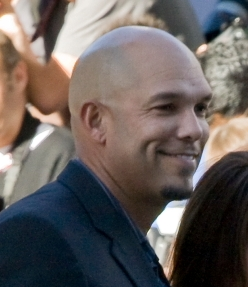
David Justice's solo home run in the sixth inning clinched the first-ever professional sports championship for the city of Atlanta.

=== Game 6 ===
October 28, 1995 7:20 pm (EDT) at Atlanta–Fulton County Stadium in Atlanta, Georgia 56 °F (13 °C), Clear
Team	1	2	3	4	5	6	7	8	9	R	H	E
Cleveland	0	0	0	0	0	0	0	0	0	0	1	1
Atlanta	0	0	0	0	0	1	0	0	X	1	6	0
WP: Tom Glavine (2–0) LP: Jim Poole (0–1) Sv: Mark Wohlers (2); Home runs: CLE: None; ATL: David Justice (1); Attendance: 51,875; Boxscore

Controversy struck on the morning of Game 6 when Atlanta newspapers printed stories that right fielder David Justice had ripped the city's fans for not matching their motivation of past seasons. Justice, who had been struggling in the postseason, was vilified before the game, but when his sixth-inning home run off a 1–1 pitch by Jim Poole broke a scoreless tie, he became a hero. Tom Glavine pitched eight innings of one-hit ball (and five innings of no-hit ball) and allowed just three walks (two to Albert Belle, who was caught stealing second in the second inning to keep a runner from advancing into scoring position) to help earn him the World Series MVP. Only one Indian advanced into scoring position in the entire game when Kenny Lofton stole second, but no one could get him in. Indians starter Dennis Martínez lasted just 4 2/3 innings due to allowing four hits and five walks, but no Braves scored. After Justice's home run, the Braves managed just one hit. The lone hit for the Indians was a bloop-single by catcher Tony Peña in the sixth, breaking up Glavine's bid to become the first pitcher since Don Larsen in 1956 to throw a no-hitter in the World Series. Closer Mark Wohlers pitched the ninth inning, preserving the 1–0 shutout and the Braves' coveted title when Carlos Baerga's fly ball landed in center fielder Marquis Grissom's glove, giving the Braves their first title in Atlanta and their first since 1957 when they were still in Milwaukee. Carlos Baerga was responsible for making the last out in three of the four Indians losses; Games 1, 2 and 6. To date, this is the last 1–0 World Series game won by the home team. Moments after the final out was recorded, a fan in the stands was shown holding a placard that simply said "...Finally!" due to the Atlanta Braves finally winning the World Series on their third try.

Game 6 was partially marred by controversy, due to an unusually wide strike zone umpire Joe Brinkman gave Glavine, which resulted in complaints from the Indians’ players.

In 1995, the Cleveland Indians batted .291 as a team, led the league in runs scored, hits, and stolen bases, and had eight .300 hitters in their starting lineup. However, the Indians were held to a .179 batting average in the World Series.

Then-Executive Committee Chairman Bud Selig presided over the Commissioner's Trophy presentation for the first time. In the previous two World Series (1992 and 1993), American League president Dr. Bobby Brown presided over the trophy presentation. Selig would become Commissioner of Baseball in 1998.

== Composite line score ==
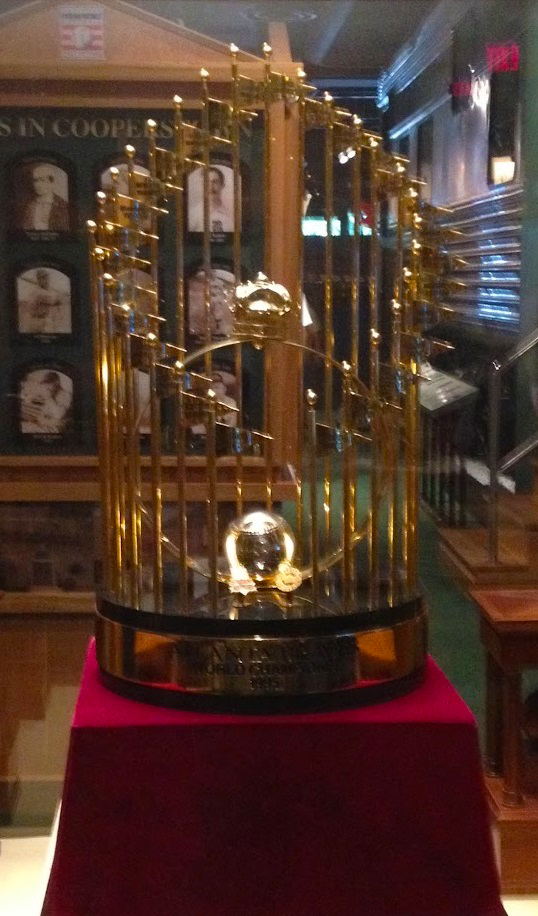
The Commissioner's Trophy presented to the Braves following their victory in the World Series.

1995 World Series (4–2): Atlanta Braves (N.L.) over Cleveland Indians (A.L.)

Team	1	2	3	4	5	6	7	8	9	10	11	R	H	E
Atlanta Braves	1	1	2	1	1	5	6	3	3	0	0	23	47	6
Cleveland Indians	5	2	2	0	0	3	2	2	2	0	1	19	35	6
Total attendance: 286,385 Average attendance: 47,731; Winning player's share: $206,635 Losing player's share: $121,946

== Aftermath ==
The 1995 Braves were in the midst of a streak of 14 consecutive division titles from 1991 through 2005 (excluding the 1994 season, which ended early due to a players strike), however this was the only World Series the Braves would win. Atlanta returned to the Series the following year, but lost to the New York Yankees in six games. The Braves of this era made one more trip to the Series in 1999, but lost to the Yankees in a four-game sweep. This was Atlanta's first championship in any of the four major professional sports, and the last for the city and for the Braves until 2021.

The Indians would go on to win the AL Central five of the following six years and return to the World Series in 1997, where they lost to the Florida Marlins in seven games. The core of the 1990s Indians teams would break up in the early 2000s. Albert Belle signed with the Chicago White Sox in free agency in the winter of 1996, while Kenny Lofton was traded to the Braves before the start of the 1997 season (he returned in 1998 to play three years with the team only to leave and return again for his final season in 2007); after the turn of the century, Manny Ramirez joined the Boston Red Sox in 2001 and Jim Thome joined the Philadelphia Phillies in 2003.

== Quotes ==
Left center field, Grissom on the run. The team of the 90s has its world championship.

— Bob Costas of NBC Sports calling the final out

== See also ==
- 1995 Japan Series
- Curse of Rocky Colavito
- Cleveland sports curse
