= 1994 World Series =

Cancelled Major League Baseball championship

- Dates: Canceled due to players' strike

The 1994 World Series was the scheduled championship series of Major League Baseball's (MLB) 1994 season. It was canceled due to a strike by the MLB Players Association. The cancelation marked the second (and most recent) time a World Series was not played in a given season and the first since 1904.

== Canceled playoffs ==
This was supposed to have been the first year of an expanded eight-team playoff system, with the American League (AL) and National League (NL) realigning into three divisions each (East, Central, and West) at the start of the 1994 season, and the addition of a wild card spot in each league. The NL champion was then intended to be assigned home-field advantage in the 1994 World Series, based on an annual rotation dating back to the mid-1930s in which the World Series opened in the NL city in even-numbered years and opened in the AL city in odd-numbered years. With the postseason canceled, the new playoff system did not go into effect until the 1995 postseason, and the annual World Series rotation (which continued until 2003) was then reversed so that home-field advantage for the 1995 World Series was assigned to the NL champion.

=== Atlanta Braves' run of division titles ===
At the time that the strike began, the Montreal Expos had a six game lead in the NL East over the Atlanta Braves, while the Braves had a 2 1/2 game lead over the Houston Astros for the NL wild card. As there were no division champions in 1994, the Braves are officially credited with winning 14 consecutive division titles from 1991 to 2005, winning the NL West in the final three years of the two–division system and then winning 11 consecutive NL East titles from 1995 to 2005.

=== Mattingly and the postseason ===
The Yankees led the American League East by 6 1/2 games when the strike began. With a berth in the playoffs likely, the strike spoiled what could have been the postseason debut for veteran first baseman Don Mattingly. Mattingly finally made the playoffs the following year (the only postseason appearance of his career) only to have the Yankees lose to the Mariners in the divisional round. After that series, the Yankees traded for Seattle first baseman Tino Martinez, effectively ending Mattingly's career.

== Television coverage ==
1994 was the first season that national telecasts were produced by The Baseball Network, a joint venture between MLB, ABC, and NBC. Under the original arrangement, ABC would have broadcast the World Series in even-numbered years (included 1994) and NBC would have televised the series in odd-numbered years. Because the 1994 World Series was cancelled, ABC and NBC shared broadcast rights to the 1995 World Series, after which the joint venture was ended.

== See also ==
- 2020 NCAA Division I men's basketball tournament
- 1994 Japan Series
