= Steve Zabriskie =

American sports announcer

Steven Kenneth Zabriskie (born May 13, 1947, in Palo Alto, California) is an American former television sports announcer who is best known for calling Major League Baseball and college football. He was a four sport athlete in high school earning All America Honorable Mention honors in football and, amid a number of offers, accepted a football scholarship to the University of Houston. Unfortunately, two severe leg injuries cut his playing career short.

== Announcing career ==
Zabriskie was a television sports play-by-play announcer for more than 30 years, during which he was awarded three Television Sports Emmys. Zabriskie served as a play-by-play announcer on college football games for ABC Sports between 1976 and 1997. He broadcast Major League Baseball for ABC with Bob Uecker from 1980 to 1982 and in 1980, served as ABC's on-field reporter for the 1980 National League Championship Series.

Zabriskie was a TV voice of the New York Mets from 1983 through 1989. Among his broadcast partners for Mets TV broadcasts were Hall of Fame announcer Tim McCarver, former Major League Baseball great Rusty Staub, and Baseball Hall of Famer Ralph Kiner. He also called Major League Baseball and college basketball games for ESPN for four seasons, The Baseball Network in 1994 and 1995 and Boston Red Sox games in 1996 and 1997. Zabriskie and Tommy Hutton called Game 3 of the 1995 American League Division Series between the Cleveland Indians and Boston Red Sox.

He served In addition to the Mets, Red Sox, ABC, and ESPN, Zabriskie called NFL and college basketball games for CBS Sports.

He also broadcast baseball games for the California Angels and covered track-and-field for CBS and various Wide World of Sports events for ABC. Before moving to the network, worked for WTAE-TV in Pittsburgh as a Sports Announcer from 1976 to 1978, being known to Pittsburgers as "The Big Z".

Zabriskie retired from broadcasting following the 1997 baseball season and has had a successful career as a registered financial adviser.
