= Chris Wheeler =

Retired Philadelphia Phillies broadcaster

- Born: August 9, 1945 (age 81); Egg Harbor Township, New Jersey, U.S.
- Sports commentary career
- Team: Philadelphia Phillies (1977–2013)
- Genre: Color commentator
- Sport: Baseball

Chris Wheeler (born August 9, 1945) is a former announcer and color commentator for the Philadelphia Phillies in Major League Baseball. He is nicknamed "Wheels".

== Early life and education ==
Wheeler was born August 9, 1945, in Egg Harbor Township, New Jersey. He attended Marple Newtown High School in Pennsylvania and then Penn State University, where he received a B.A. in journalism in 1967.

== Career ==
Following graduation, he began his broadcasting career with WCAU radio in Philadelphia, where he was an airborne traffic reporter as well as a news writer and reporter. He later worked at WBBM in Chicago and CBS Radio in New York City.

Wheeler joined the Philadelphia Phillies as assistant director of publicity and public relations in 1971 and began broadcasting in 1977.

In 1982, he was appointed director of the Phillies' community relations department. He was the camp coordinator for Phillies Dream Week from 1983 to 1999 and ran the team's speakers bureau from 1991 to 1997. He was released as a Phillies broadcaster on January 8, 2014.
