= Pete Van Wieren =

American sportscaster (1944–2014)

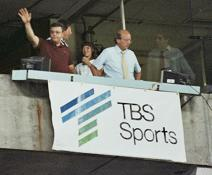
- Skip Caray (left) and Van Wieren acknowledging fans at a Braves game in 1983
- Born: Peter Dirk Van Wieren; October 7, 1944; Rochester, New York, U.S.
- Died: August 2, 2014 (aged 69); Atlanta, Georgia, U.S.
- Occupation: Sportscaster
- Spouse: Elaine Van Wieren (m. 1964-2014; his death)
- Children: 2

Peter Dirk Van Wieren (October 7, 1944 – August 2, 2014) was an American sportscaster best known for his long career calling play-by-play for Major League Baseball's Atlanta Braves.

== Early career ==
Van Wieren was born in Rochester, New York, and attended Cornell University, where he started his broadcast career by substituting for the regular broadcaster of the Cornell basketball game, who had gotten into a car accident. Van Wieren left Cornell before the start of his junior year, and eventually landed a couple of radio jobs in Northern Virginia. In 1966, he moved to Binghamton, New York for his first baseball broadcasting job, where he revived game broadcasts for the AA minor league Binghamton Triplets after they had been off the air for several years. He served as the Triplets' play-by-play broadcaster for two seasons before the team folded, at both WNBF and WINR. Van Wieren moved in 1972 to work in Toledo, Ohio for WDHO-TV, but returned to play-by-play broadcasting for the AAA Tidewater Tides in 1974.

== Atlanta Braves ==
Van Wieren was hired by Turner Sports as a play-by-play broadcaster for the Atlanta Braves in December 1975. From 1976 to 2008, he called the team's television and/or radio broadcasts, teaming with a number of on-air partners including Ernie Johnson Sr., Don Sutton and Skip Caray (who was hired by the club at the same time as himself). Johnson originally nicknamed Van Wieren "The Professor" because Van Wieren looked like pitcher Jim Brosnan. The moniker stuck for his in-depth knowledge of the game and thorough preparation before broadcasts.

According to Van Wieren himself, on the September 17, 2007, Atlanta Braves Radio Network broadcast, he worked for the Washington Post in the 1960s. He did not say what his position was at the paper, only that he met Shirley Povich while he was there.

Along with Caray, Van Wieren was inducted into the Atlanta Braves Hall of Fame in 2004, joining an impressive list in Braves history that already included Hank Aaron, Lew Burdette, Del Crandall, Tommy Holmes, Ernie Johnson Sr., Eddie Mathews, Phil Niekro, Dale Murphy, Kid Nichols, Ted Turner, Johnny Sain and Warren Spahn.

On December 18, 2006, the Braves announced that Van Wieren had signed a three-year contract to continue doing Braves broadcasts on the radio.

== Non-Atlanta Braves assignments ==
An eight-time winner of the Georgia Sportscaster of the Year award from the National Sportscasters and Sportswriters Association, Van Wieren broadcast a number of sports in addition to Braves baseball. After joining TBS Sports in 1975, he covered Atlanta Hawks basketball, Atlanta Flames hockey, Big Ten Conference college football, Atlanta Falcons pre-season football, and NBA games on TBS and TNT. He also served as a sports reporter for CNN.

In 1995, Van Wieren alongside Larry Dierker called Games 1–3 of the National League Division Series between the Atlanta Braves and Colorado Rockies for The Baseball Network. The first two games were broadcast on NBC while Game 3 was on ABC.

== Retirement and death ==
On October 21, 2008, Van Wieren unexpectedly announced his retirement from broadcasting effective immediately, after 33 seasons with the Braves. His departure came less than three months after the death of his longtime on-air partner Skip Caray. The broadcast booth for the Braves' home games at Turner Field was named for Van Wieren.

Van Wieren co-wrote a book titled Of Mikes and Men: A Lifetime of Braves Baseball with Jack Wilkinson. It was released in April 2010.

On November 4, 2009, Van Wieren was diagnosed with cutaneous B-cell lymphoma. He suffered a relapse and additional rounds of chemotherapy after a recurrence in the fall of 2010. On August 2, 2014, Van Wieren died from complications of lymphoma. He was married to Elaine Van Wieren, with whom he had two children, from 1964 until his death.
