= Tommy Hutton =

American baseball player and analyst (born 1946)

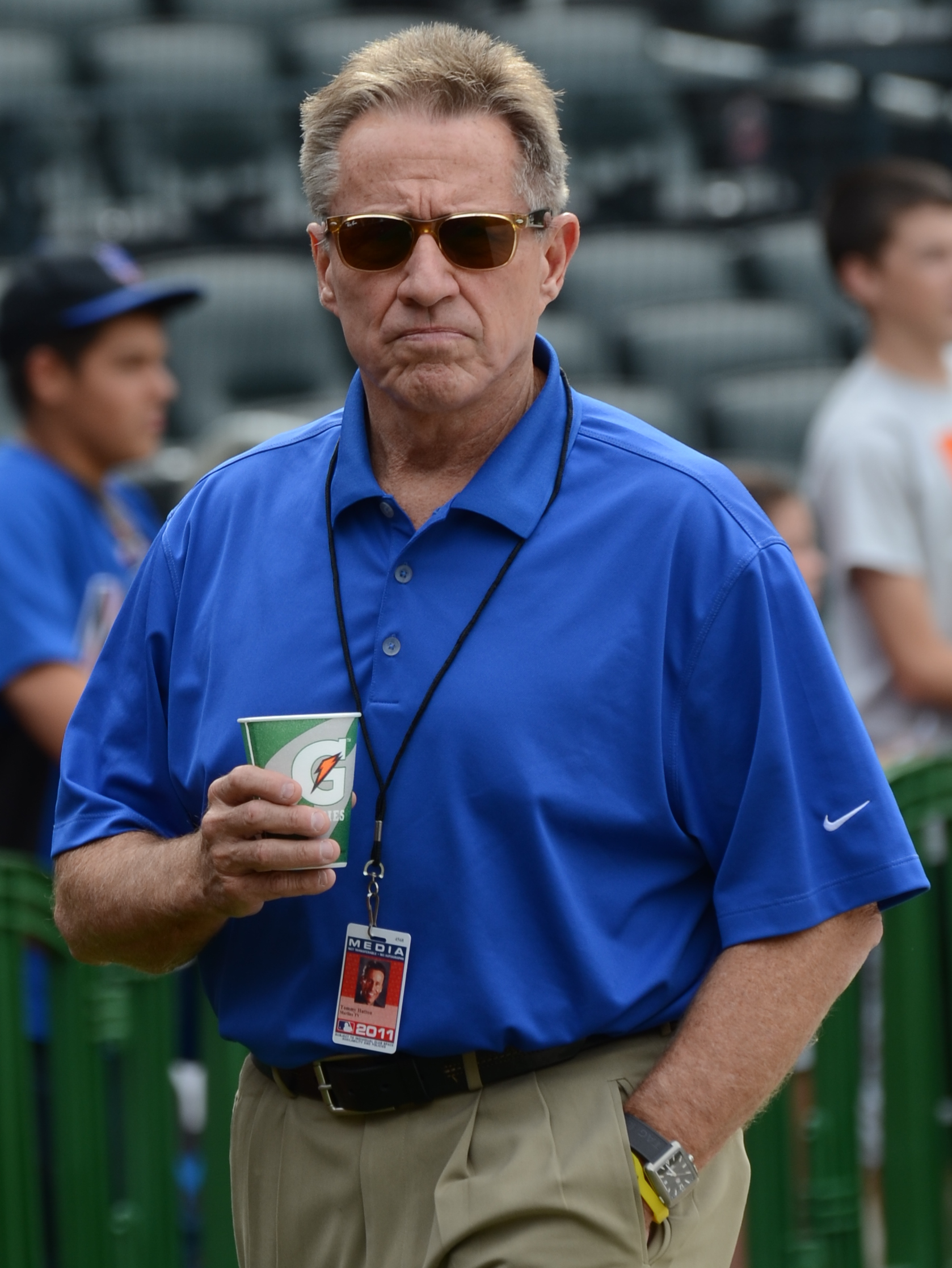
- Hutton in 2011
- First baseman / Outfielder
- Born: April 20, 1946 (age 80); Los Angeles, California, U.S.
- Batted: Left Threw: Left

MLB debut
- September 16, 1966, for the Los Angeles Dodgers

Last MLB appearance
- September 3, 1981, for the Montreal Expos

MLB statistics
- Batting average: .248
- Home runs: 22
- Runs batted in: 186
- Stats at Baseball Reference

Teams
- Los Angeles Dodgers (1966, 1969); Philadelphia Phillies (1972–1977); Toronto Blue Jays (1978); Montreal Expos (1978–1981)

Thomas George Hutton (born April 20, 1946) is an American former professional baseball infielder-outfielder who played in Major League Baseball (MLB) with the Los Angeles Dodgers, Philadelphia Phillies, Toronto Blue Jays, and Montreal Expos.

Hutton is currently a color analyst for Miami Marlins baseball broadcasts, initially 1997-2015, then returning in 2022. He is planning to retire following the 2026 season.

== Playing career ==
Hutton played at South Pasadena High School and in the major leagues with the Los Angeles Dodgers, in 1966 and 1969, Philadelphia Phillies, from 1972 to 1977, Toronto Blue Jays, in 1978, and the Montreal Expos, from the latter part of the 1978 season to his final game on September 3, 1981. He appeared in the 1976 and 1977 National League Championship Series (NLCS), with the Phillies. He batted .309 with two home runs and eleven runs batted in (RBI) mostly as a pinch hitter with the Phillies in 1977 before his contract was sold to the Blue Jays at the Winter Meetings on December 8.

Hutton was highly regarded as a standout fielder at first base. He gained considerable notoriety during his Phillies career for his success against Hall of Fame pitcher Tom Seaver of the New York Mets; in 62 plate appearances against Seaver, Hutton batted .320, with 11 walks, three homers and 15 RBI.

Hutton is also notable for never having been hit by pitch during his professional career, in 1,920 plate appearances.

In 952 games over 12 seasons, Hutton posted a .248 batting average (410-for-1655) with 196 runs, 22 home runs and 186 RBI. He was good defensively, recording a .995 fielding percentage playing primarily at first base and at all three outfield positions.

== Broadcasting career ==
After being released by the Expos, Hutton moved from the dugout to the broadcast booth. He worked as a color commentator with ESPN, the Expos (1985–1986), New York Yankees (1987–1989), Blue Jays (1990–1996), and Marlins (1997–2015). In 1995, Hutton called Games 1–2 of the American League Division Series between the Seattle Mariners and New York Yankees alongside Gary Thorne for NBC and Game 3 of the ALDS between the Cleveland Indians and Boston Red Sox alongside Steve Zabriskie for ABC.

Owing in great part to an organizational reshuffle, Hutton retired from his 19-season-long broadcasting position with the Marlins following the 2015 season. After a six year absence from the booth, Hutton returned to his original position. It was announced he would retire again following the 2026 season.

== Personal ==
His brother-in-law Dick Ruthven was an MLB pitcher from 1973 to 1986. The two were teammates on the Phillies from 1973 to 1975.

A cousin, Bill Seinsoth, was a star baseball player at the University of Southern California before he was killed in a 1969 automobile accident.
