= 2001 Toronto Blue Jays season =

2001 Toronto Blue Jays
- League: American League
- Division: East
- Ballpark: SkyDome
- City: Toronto
- Record: 80–82 (.494)
- Divisional place: 3rd
- Owners: Rogers; Paul Godfrey (CEO)
- General managers: Gord Ash
- Managers: Buck Martinez
- Television: CBC Television (Brian Williams, John Cerutti); The Sports Network (Dan Shulman, Pat Tabler); CTV Sportsnet (Rob Faulds, Jerry Howarth)
- Radio: CHUM (AM) (Jerry Howarth, Tom Cheek, Gary Matthews)

The 2001 Toronto Blue Jays was the franchise's 25th season of Major League Baseball. It resulted in the Blue Jays finishing third in the American League East with a record of 80 wins and 82 losses.

== Transactions ==
Transactions by the Toronto Blue Jays during the off-season before the 2001 season.

=== October 2000 ===
October 4	Marty Cordova granted free agency (signed with Cleveland Indians to a one-year, $500,000 contract on December 20, 2000).
October 5	Mark Lukasiewicz selected off of waivers by the Anaheim Angels.
October 15	Kevin Witt granted free agency (signed with San Diego Padres to a one-year contract on December 22, 2000).
October 20	Re-signed Carlos Delgado to a four-year, $68 million contract.
October 18	Charlie Greene granted free agency (signed with San Diego Padres to a one-year contract on November 30, 2000). Robert Pérez granted free agency (signed with New York Yankees to a contract on November 16, 2000).
October 30	Alex Gonzalez granted free agency (signed with Toronto Blue Jays to a four-year, $20 million contract on December 10, 2000).
October 31	Frank Castillo granted free agency (signed with Boston Red Sox to a two-year, $4.5 million contract on December 7, 2000). Mark Guthrie granted free agency (signed with Oakland Athletics to a two-year, $3.6 million contract on January 5, 2001). Dave Martinez granted free agency (signed with Atlanta Braves to a two-year, $3 million contract on December 10, 2000). Mickey Morandini granted free agency (signed with Toronto Blue Jays to a contract on December 6, 2000). Steve Trachsel granted free agency (signed with New York Mets to a two-year, $7.3 million contract on December 14, 2000).

=== November 2000 ===
November 1	Craig Grebeck granted free agency (signed with Boston Red Sox to a one-year, $700,000 contract on January 19, 2001). Re-signed Darrin Fletcher to a three-year, $10.9 million contract.
November 5	Signed free agent Aaron Holbert from the Florida Marlins to a one-year contract.
November 7	Acquired Scott Eyre from the Chicago White Sox for Gary Glover.
November 19	Signed amateur free agent Robinzon Díaz to a contract.
November 22	Acquired Steve Parris from the Cincinnati Reds for Clayton Andrews and Leo Estrella.

=== December 2000 ===
December 2	Signed free agent Chris Latham from the Colorado Rockies to a contract.
December 6	Re-signed free agent Mickey Morandini to a contract.
December 7	Signed free agent Jason Dickson from the Anaheim Angels to a one-year contract.
December 8	Signed free agent Dan Plesac from the Arizona Diamondbacks to a two-year, $4.4 million contract.
December 10	Re-signed free agent Alex Gonzalez to a four-year, $20 million contract.
December 11	Jay Gibbons drafted by the Baltimore Orioles in the 2000 MLB Rule 5 draft. Signed free agent Jeff Frye from the Colorado Rockies to a one-year, $1 million contract. Acquired Jayson Werth from the Baltimore Orioles for John Bale.
December 13	Signed free agent Chris Michalak from the Los Angeles Dodgers to a one-year, $200,000 contract. Signed free agent Jaime Navarro from the Cleveland Indians to a contract.
December 15	Signed free agent Ryan Thompson from the New York Yankees to a contract.
December 19	Signed free agent Izzy Molina from the Kansas City Royals to a one-year contract.
December 21	Signed free agent Trent Hubbard from the Baltimore Orioles to a contract.

=== January 2001 ===
January 9	Signed free agent Héctor Carrasco from the Boston Red Sox to a contract.
January 14	Acquired Mike Sirotka, Brian Simmons, Kevin Beirne and Mike Williams from the Chicago White Sox for David Wells and Matt DeWitt.
January 16	Sent Chad Mottola to the Florida Marlins as part of a conditional deal.
January 18	Re-signed Brad Fullmer to a two-year, $6.5 million contract. Re-signed Esteban Loaiza to a two-year, $10.3 million contract.
January 24	Signed amateur free agent Alfredo Aceves to a contract.

=== February 2001 ===
February 9	Re-signed Kelvim Escobar to a one-year, $1.5 million contract.
February 12	Re-signed Steve Parris to a two-year, $6.05 million contract.

=== March 2001 ===
March 17	Released Trent Hubbard.
March 20	Acquired Matt DeWitt from the Chicago White Sox for Mike Williams.
March 28	Released Héctor Carrasco. Released Todd Greene.

== Regular season ==
- August 17, 2001: Jeff Frye became the second Blue Jay in history to hit for the cycle. He achieved the feat against the Texas Rangers.

=== Opening Day starters ===
- Tony Batista
- José Cruz Jr.
- Carlos Delgado
- Darrin Fletcher
- Homer Bush
- Brad Fullmer
- Alex Gonzalez
- Esteban Loaiza
- Raúl Mondesí
- Shannon Stewart

=== Season standings ===
AL East
Team	W	L	Pct.	GB	Home	Road
New York Yankees	95	65	.594	—	51‍–‍28	44‍–‍37
Boston Red Sox	82	79	.509	13½	41‍–‍40	41‍–‍39
Toronto Blue Jays	80	82	.494	16	40‍–‍42	40‍–‍40
Baltimore Orioles	63	98	.391	32½	30‍–‍50	33‍–‍48
Tampa Bay Devil Rays	62	100	.383	34	37‍–‍44	25‍–‍56

=== Record vs. opponents ===
2001 American League record Source: MLB Standings Grid – 2001
Team	ANA	BAL	BOS	CWS	CLE	DET	KC	MIN	NYY	OAK	SEA	TB	TEX	TOR	NL
Anaheim	—	4–5	4–3	6–3	5–4	5–4	5–4	3–6	4–3	6–14	4–15	7–2	7–12	5–4	10–8
Baltimore	5–4	—	9–10	3–4	1–5	4–2	5–2	3–3	5–13–1	2–7	1–8	10–9	2–7	7–12	6–12
Boston	3–4	10–9	—	3–3	3–6	4–5	3–3	3–3	5–13	4–5	3–6	14–5	5–2	12–7	10–8
Chicago	3–6	4–3	3–3	—	10–9	13–6	14–5	5–14	1–5	1–8	2–7	5–2	7–2	3–3	12–6
Cleveland	4–5	5–1	6–3	9–10	—	13–6	11–8	14–5	4–5	4–3	2–5	5–1	5–4	2–4	7–11
Detroit	4–5	2–4	5–4	6–13	6–13	—	8–11	4–15	4–5	1–6	2–5	4–2	8–1	2–4	10–8
Kansas City	4–5	2–5	3–3	5–14	8–11	11–8	—	6–13	0–6	3–6	3–6	4–2	4–5	4–3	8–10
Minnesota	6–3	3–3	3–3	14–5	5–14	15–4	13–6	—	4–2	5–4	1–8	1–6	4–5	2–5	9–9
New York	3–4	13–5–1	13–5	5–1	5–4	5–4	6–0	2–4	—	3–6	3–6	13–6	3–4	11–8	10–8
Oakland	14–6	7–2	5–4	8–1	3–4	6–1	6–3	4–5	6–3	—	9–10	7–2	9–10	6–3	12–6
Seattle	15–4	8–1	6–3	7–2	5–2	5–2	6–3	8–1	6–3	10–9	—	7–2	15–5	6–3	12–6
Tampa Bay	2–7	9–10	5–14	2–5	1–5	2–4	2–4	6–1	6–13	2–7	2–7	—	4–5	9–10	10–8
Texas	12–7	7–2	2–5	2–7	4–5	1–8	5–4	5–4	4–3	10–9	5–15	5–4	—	3–6	8–10
Toronto	4–5	12–7	7–12	3–3	4–2	4–2	3–4	5–2	8–11	3–6	3–6	10–9	6–3	—	8–10

=== Transactions ===
Transactions for the Toronto Blue Jays during the 2001 regular season.

==== April 2001 ====
April 2	Signed free agent Willie Banks of the New York Mets to a one-year contract. Released Ryan Thompson.
April 16	Signed free agent Patrick Lennon of the Montreal Expos to a contract.

==== June 2001 ====
June 1	Released Patrick Lennon.
June 8	Signed free agent Tony Fernández from the Milwaukee Brewers to a one-year contract.
June 25	Tony Batista selected off of waivers by the Baltimore Orioles.
June 27	Signed free agent Deion Sanders from the Cincinnati Reds as a free agent.
June 29	Released Lance Painter.

==== July 2001 ====
July 6	Purchased Brian Hunter from the Atlantic City Surf of the Atlantic League.
July 27	Released Deion Sanders.
July 31	Released John Frascatore.

==== August 2001 ====
August 3	Released Joey Hamilton. Re-signed Paul Quantrill to a three-year, $9.6 million contract.
August 13	Released Brian Hunter.
August 15	Released Willie Banks.
August 22	Chris Michalak selected off of waivers by the Texas Rangers.
August 27	Signed amateur free agent Eugenio Vélez to a contract.

=== 2001 draft picks ===
The 2002 MLB draft was held in June 2001.

Round	Pick	Player	Position	College/School	Nationality
1	15	Gabe Gross	OF	Auburn University	(United States)
2	59	Brandon League	RHP	St. Louis High School (Honolulu, HI)	(United States)
3	91	Tyrell Godwin	OF	East Bladen High School	(United States)
4	121	Chris Sheffield	RHP	University of Miami	(United States)
5	151	Mike Rouse	SS	California State University, Fullerton	(United States)
6	181	Lee Delfino	SS	East Carolina University	(United States)
7	211	Jason Colson	RHP	Winthrop University	(United States)
8	241	Sean Grimes	LHP	Saunders Secondary School	(Canada)
9	271	Luke Hetherington	OF	Kentwood High School	(United States)
10	301	Ryan Costello	LHP	Montclair State University	(United States)

=== Roster ===
2001 Toronto Blue Jays
Roster
Pitchers: 40 Kevin Beirne; 51 Pedro Borbón Jr.; 37 Brian Bowles; 26 Chris Carpenter; 38 Pasqual Coco; 49 Matt DeWitt; 45 Kelvim Escobar; 29 Scott Eyre; 36 Bob File; 52 John Frascatore; 32 Roy Halladay; 50 Joey Hamilton; 44 Billy Koch; 21 Esteban Loaiza; 28 Brandon Lyon; 17 Chris Michalak; 28 Lance Painter; 39 Steve Parris; 19 Dan Plesac; 48 Paul Quantrill	Catchers: 30 Alberto Castillo; 9 Darrin Fletcher; 17 Josh Phelps; Infielders: 7 Tony Batista; 18 Homer Bush; 25 Carlos Delgado; 11 Ryan Freel; 3 Jeff Frye; 20 Brad Fullmer; 8 Alex Gonzalez; 2 César Izturis; 7 Felipe López; 12 Luis Lopez; 5 Chris Woodward	Outfielders: 23 José Cruz Jr.; 27 Chris Latham; 43 Raúl Mondesí; 22 Brian Simmons; 24 Shannon Stewart; 10 Vernon Wells; Other batters: 1 Tony Fernández	Manager: 13 Buck Martinez; Coaches: 35 Terry Bevington (third base); 53 Mark Connor (pitching); 41 Cito Gaston (hitting); 16 Garth Iorg (first base); 47 Gil Patterson (bullpen); 1,4 Cookie Rojas (bench)

=== Game log ===
2001 Game Log
April: 16–9 (Home: 11–5; Away: 5–4)

#	Date	Opponent	Score	Win	Loss	Save	Attendance	Record
1	April 1	Rangers †	8–1	Loaiza (1–0)	Helling (0–1)		19,891	1–0
2	April 3	@ Devil Rays	8–1	Lopez (1–0)	Parris (0–1)		41,546	1–1
3	April 4	@ Devil Rays	11–8	Quantrill (1–0)	Hill (0–1)	Koch (1)	15,172	2–1
4	April 5	@ Devil Rays	11–0	Carpenter (1–0)	Rekar (0–1)		14,023	3–1
5	April 6	@ Yankees	13–4	Loaiza (2–0)	Parker (0–1)		29,606	4–1
6	April 7	@ Yankees	3–2	Michalak (1–0)	Hernández (0–1)	Koch (2)	30,487	5–1
7	April 8	@ Yankees	16–5	Clemens (2–0)	Parris (0–2)		31,970	5–2
8	April 9	Devil Rays	8–1	Hamilton (1–0)	Wilson (0–1)		48,115	6–2
9	April 10	Devil Rays	3–2 (10)	Quantrill (2–0)	Sturtze (0–1)		18,071	7–2
10	April 11	Devil Rays	4–3	Yan (1–0)	Koch (0–1)		24,017	7–3
–	April 12	Royals	Postponed (SkyDome roof malfunction) Rescheduled for April 30					
11	April 13	Royals	2–1	Michalak (2–0)	Suppan (1–2)	Koch (3)	26,148	8–3
12	April 14	Royals	5–4	File (1–0)	Hernández (0–2)		26,024	9–3
13	April 15	Royals	4–2	Stein (1–2)	Carpenter (1–1)	Hernández (2)	21,379	9–4
14	April 17	Yankees	6–5	Loaiza (3–0)	Keisler (0–1)	Koch (4)	20,019	10–4
15	April 18	Yankees	7–2	Michalak (3–0)	Hernández (0–2)		19,770	11–4
16	April 19	Yankees	6–5 (17)	Choate (1–0)	File (1–1)	Mendoza (1)	24,684	11–5
17	April 20	@ Royals	12–4	Carpenter (2–1)	Suzuki (1–1)		28,018	12–5
18	April 21	@ Royals	5–4 (13)	Henry (1–0)	Plesac (0–1)		18,246	12–6
19	April 22	@ Royals	5–1	Reichert (2–1)	Loaiza (3–1)	Hernández (4)	17,371	12–7
20	April 24	Rangers	7–5	Frascatore (1–0)	Mahomes (0–2)	Koch (5)	15,381	13–7
21	April 25	Rangers	8–5	Quantrill (3–0)	Rogers (1–2)	Koch (6)	15,021	14–7
22	April 27	Angels	12–4	Loaiza (4–1)	Washburn (0–3)		16,174	15–7
23	April 28	Angels	4–1	Ortiz (3–2)	Michalak (3–1)	Percival (4)	19,261	15–8
24	April 29	Angels	2–0	Parris (1–2)	Schoeneweis (2–2)	Koch (7)	23,949	16–8
25	April 30	Royals	6–3	Suppan (2–3)	Hamilton (1–1)	Hernández (6)	13,766	16–9

May: 10–18 (Home: 2–8; Away: 8–10)

#	Date	Opponent	Score	Win	Loss	Save	Attendance	Record
26	May 1	@ Athletics	5–4 (10)	Quantrill (4–0)	Isringhausen (0–1)	Koch (8)	10,935	17–9
27	May 2	@ Athletics	6–0	Mulder (3–2)	Loaiza (4–2)		14,048	17–10
28	May 3	@ Athletics	3–2 (15)	Bradford (1–1)	Borbón (0–1)		10,586	17–11
29	May 4	@ Mariners	8–3	Parris (2–2)	Abbott (0–1)		42,284	18–11
30	May 5	@ Mariners	7–5	Rhodes (3–0)	Borbón (0–2)	Sasaki (14)	42,894	18–12
31	May 6	@ Mariners	11–3	Carpenter (3–1)	Halama (2–3)		45,080	19–12
32	May 8	Athletics	8–5	Mulder (4–2)	Loaiza (4–3)	Mecir (1)	16,479	19–13
33	May 9	Athletics	8–5	Hudson (3–3)	Michalak (3–2)	Isringhausen (5)	16,241	19–14
34	May 10	Athletics	14–8	Guthrie (1–0)	Painter (0–1)		16,130	19–15
35	May 11	Mariners	7–2	Abbott (1–1)	Hamilton (1–2)		20,279	19–16
36	May 12	Mariners	11–7	Tomko (2–1)	Escobar (0–1)		24,908	19–17
37	May 13	Mariners	7–5	Moyer (6–1)	Loaiza (4–4)	Sasaki (17)	20,624	19–18
38	May 15	@ Angels	9–3	Michalak (4–2)	Valdez (2–3)		15,904	20–18
39	May 16	@ Angels	3–1	Schoeneweis (3–2)	Parris (2–3)	Percival (8)	15,611	20–19
40	May 17	@ Angels	4–2	Hasegawa (2–3)	Escobar (0–2)	Percival (9)	15,204	20–20
41	May 18	@ Rangers	9–3	Carpenter (4–1)	Myette (0–1)		35,368	21–20
42	May 19	@ Rangers	6–5	Quantrill (5–0)	Brantley (0–1)	Koch (9)	48,336	22–20
43	May 20	@ Rangers	3–2	Mahomes (3–2)	Michalak (4–3)	Zimmerman (4)	33,272	22–21
44	May 21	White Sox	10–3	Parris (3–3)	Biddle (1–4)		20,806	23–21
45	May 23	White Sox	9–6	Hamilton (2–2)	Wells (3–5)	Koch (10)	19,115	24–21
46	May 24	White Sox	3–1	Wells (1–1)	Carpenter (4–2)	Foulke (8)	17,062	24–22
47	May 25	@ Red Sox	4–0	Nomo (5–3)	Loaiza (4–5)		32,912	24–23
48	May 26	@ Red Sox	5–0	Michalak (5–3)	Castillo (5–3)		31,035	25–23
49	May 27	@ Red Sox	4–2	Wakefield (2–0)	Parris (3–4)	Lowe (4)	31,420	25–24
50	May 28	@ White Sox	6–3	Garland (2–2)	Hamilton (2–3)	Howry (1)	20,631	25–25
51	May 29	@ White Sox	4–0	Carpenter (5–2)	Wells (1–2)		13,356	26–25
52	May 30	@ White Sox	4–3	Wunsch (1–1)	Escobar (0–3)	Foulke (9)	13,208	26–26
53	May 31	Red Sox	11–5	Beck (1–2)	Escobar (0–4)		21,747	26–27

June: 12–15 (Home: 7–11; Away: 5–4)

#	Date	Opponent	Score	Win	Loss	Save	Attendance	Record
54	June 1	Red Sox	6–4 (11)	Lowe (3–5)	Koch (0–2)		21,564	26–28
55	June 2	Red Sox	2–1	Schourek (1–3)	Plesac (0–2)	Beck (3)	24,603	26–29
56	June 3	Red Sox	5–4	Pichardo (1–0)	Carpenter (5–3)	Lowe (6)	24,653	26–30
57	June 5	Devil Rays	13–1	Loaiza (5–5)	Lopez (3–7)		15,078	27–30
58	June 6	Devil Rays	6–2	Kennedy (1–0)	Michalak (5–4)		16,298	27–31
59	June 7	Devil Rays	8–7	Borbón (1–2)	Phelps (0–1)		26,835	28–31
60	June 8	Marlins	7–6 (10)	Koch (1–2)	Bones (2–2)		18,629	29–31
61	June 9	Marlins	6–1	Burnett (4–2)	Carpenter (5–4)		20,875	29–32
62	June 10	Marlins	7–2	Penny (5–1)	Loaiza (5–6)		20,070	29–33
63	June 11	Braves	9–4	File (2–1)	Burkett (5–5)		16,885	30–33
64	June 12	Braves	3–0	Pérez (4–4)	Parris (3–5)	Rocker (19)	20,448	30–34
65	June 13	Braves	12–5	Hamilton (3–3)	Glavine (6–5)		19,901	31–34
66	June 15	@ Expos	9–3	Carpenter (6–4)	Vázquez (5–8)		8,692	32–34
67	June 16	@ Expos	7–2	Blank (1–2)	Loaiza (5–7)		11,113	32–35
68	June 17	@ Expos	4–1	Mota (1–0)	Quantrill (5–1)		8,440	32–36
69	June 18	@ Orioles	3–2	Ponson (4–4)	Borbón (1–3)	Trombley (5)	33,605	32–37
70	June 19	@ Orioles	5–1	Towers (5–1)	Hamilton (3–4)	Groom (4)	31,001	32–38
71	June 20	@ Orioles	6–5	Quantrill (6–1)	McElroy (1–2)	Koch (11)	30,062	33–38
72	June 22	@ Red Sox	4–3	Borbón (2–3)	Schourek (1–4)	Koch (12)	33,844	34–38
73	June 23	@ Red Sox	9–6	File (3–1)	Castillo (7–5)	Koch (13)	33,266	35–38
74	June 24	@ Red Sox	5–2	Plesac (1–2)	Wakefield (5–2)	Koch (14)	32,804	36–38
75	June 25	Orioles	8–2	Roberts (6–6)	Hamilton (3–5)		18,243	36–39
76	June 26	Orioles	3–1	Carpenter (7–4)	Johnson (6–5)	Koch (15)	18,175	37–39
77	June 27	Orioles	7–3	Mercedes (4–8)	Loaiza (5–8)		17,517	37–40
78	June 28	Orioles	5–0	Ponson (5–5)	Michalak (5–5)		17,322	37–41
79	June 29	Red Sox	8–4	Quantrill (7–1)	Florie (0–1)		23,055	38–41
80	June 30	Red Sox	7–5	Cone (4–1)	Hamilton (3–6)		28,543	38–42

July: 11–16 (Home: 4–8; Away: 7–8)

#	Date	Opponent	Score	Win	Loss	Save	Attendance	Record
81	July 1	Red Sox	4–0	Arrojo (2–2)	Carpenter (7–5)		34,348	38–43
82	July 2	Red Sox	16–4	Nomo (7–4)	Loaiza (5–9)		38,237	38–44
83	July 3	@ Devil Rays	7–2	Kennedy (3–1)	Michalak (5–6)	Phelps (3)	13,789	38–45
84	July 4	@ Devil Rays	8–1	Parris (4–5)	Rekar (1–10)		13,119	39–45
85	July 5	@ Devil Rays	7–4	Hamilton (4–6)	Rupe (4–8)	Koch (16)	10,706	40–45
86	July 6	Expos	10–7	Lloyd (7–1)	Quantrill (7–2)	Urbina (13)	20,074	40–46
87	July 7	Expos	9–8 (11)	Plesac (2–2)	Strickland (1–4)		23,976	41–46
88	July 8	Expos	9–3	Michalak (6–6)	Armas (7–8)	Quantrill (1)	31,012	42–46
89	July 12	@ Phillies	2–1 (11)	Escobar (1–4)	Santiago (0–2)	Koch (17)	20,306	43–46
90	July 13	@ Phillies	5–2	Daal (10–2)	Plesac (2–3)	Mesa (25)	18,279	43–47
91	July 14	@ Phillies	4–2	Hamilton (5–6)	Figueroa (1–2)	Koch (18)	22,418	44–47
92	July 15	@ Mets	6–2	Reed (8–4)	Michalak (6–7)		32,138	44–48
93	July 16	@ Mets	3–0	Trachsel (3–10)	Halladay (0–1)	Benítez (21)	34,203	44–49
94	July 17	@ Mets	1–0	Leiter (6–8)	Carpenter (7–6)	Benítez (22)	26,630	44–50
95	July 18	Red Sox	5–4	Garcés (3–0)	Koch (1–3)	Lowe (19)	30,449	44–51
96	July 19	Red Sox	4–3	Escobar (2–4)	Lowe (4–7)		30,488	45–51
97	July 20	@ Yankees	10–4	Loaiza (6–9)	Jodie (0–1)		46,634	46–51
98	July 21	@ Yankees	5–3	Quantrill (8–2)	Rivera (3–5)	Koch (19)	55,264	47–51
99	July 22	@ Yankees	7–3	Mussina (10–8)	Carpenter (7–7)		51,132	47–52
100	July 23	@ Yankees	7–2	Clemens (14–1)	Parris (4–6)		38,573	47–53
101	July 24	@ Red Sox	6–4	Cone (6–1)	Hamilton (5–7)	Lowe (20)	33,154	47–54
102	July 25	@ Red Sox	4–3 (10)	Quantrill (9–2)	Lowe (4–8)	Koch (20)	33,030	48–54
103	July 26	@ Red Sox	6–3	Nomo (11–4)	File (3–2)	Beck (5)	33,094	48–55
104	July 27	Yankees	9–1	Mussina (11–8)	Carpenter (7–8)		36,666	48–56
105	July 28	Yankees	12–1	Clemens (15–1)	Escobar (2–5)		44,105	48–57
106	July 29	Yankees	9–3	Pettitte (11–6)	Hamilton (5–8)		40,149	48–58
107	July 31	Twins	3–1	Loaiza (7–9)	Mays (12–8)	Koch (21)	23,849	49–58

August: 16–12 (Home: 7–5; Away: 9–7)

#	Date	Opponent	Score	Win	Loss	Save	Attendance	Record
108	August 1	Twins	3–1	Halladay (1–1)	Lohse (3–4)	Koch (22)	26,069	50–58
109	August 2	Twins	9–4	Reed (9–6)	Carpenter (7–9)		26,849	50–59
110	August 3	Orioles	10–1	Escobar (3–5)	Mercedes (5–13)		20,115	51–59
111	August 4	Orioles	2–1	Lyon (1–0)	Ponson (5–7)	Koch (23)	22,322	52–59
112	August 5	Orioles	5–4	Loaiza (8–9)	Towers (6–7)	Koch (24)	27,724	53–59
113	August 7	@ Mariners	5–4 (14)	Halama (8–6)	DeWitt (0–1)		45,636	53–60
114	August 8	@ Mariners	12–4	Moyer (13–5)	Carpenter (7–10)		45,450	53–61
115	August 9	@ Mariners	6–5	Quantrill (10–2)	García (13–4)	Koch (25)	45,670	54–61
116	August 10	@ Angels	8–7	Schoeneweis (9–8)	Lyon (1–1)	Percival (32)	30,484	54–62
117	August 11	@ Angels	7–6 (10)	Plesac (3–3)	Levine (5–7)	Koch (26)	27,927	55–62
118	August 12	@ Angels	6–5	Levine (6–7)	Plesac (3–4)	Percival (33)	19,129	55–63
119	August 14	Athletics	6–3	Koch (2–3)	Isringhausen (4–3)		25,121	56–63
120	August 15	Athletics	5–2	Escobar (4–5)	Zito (8–8)	Koch (27)	23,135	57–63
121	August 16	Athletics	8–4	Lidle (8–5)	Lyon (1–2)		30,062	57–64
122	August 17	Rangers	11–3	Loaiza (9–9)	Oliver (9–8)		22,384	58–64
123	August 18	Rangers	12–5	Moreno (3–2)	Koch (2–4)		26,092	58–65
124	August 19	Rangers	8–4	Myette (2–2)	Carpenter (7–11)		30,336	58–66
125	August 20	@ Twins	3–2	Escobar (5–5)	Mays (12–12)	Koch (28)	16,032	59–66
126	August 21	@ Twins	7–5	Lyon (2–2)	Cressend (2–2)	Koch (29)	13,023	60–66
127	August 22	@ Twins	6–3	Reed (2–2)	Loaiza (9–10)		15,303	60–67
128	August 23	@ Twins	6–2	Halladay (2–1)	Lohse (4–6)		16,482	61–67
129	August 24	@ Orioles	5–0	Carpenter (8–11)	Johnson (10–9)		43,606	62–67
130	August 25	@ Orioles	9–0	Escobar (6–5)	Maduro (2–4)		42,260	63–67
131	August 26	@ Orioles	5–1	Lyon (3–2)	Mercedes (7–15)		37,994	64–67
132	August 28	@ Yankees	4–0	Mussina (13–11)	Loaiza (9–11)	Rivera (41)	37,450	64–68
133	August 29	@ Yankees	3–2	Halladay (3–1)	Hitchcock (3–3)	Koch (30)	36,855	65–68
134	August 30	@ Yankees	5–4 (11)	Witasick (3–0)	Eyre (0–1)		42,537	65–69
135	August 31	Tigers	4–3	Sparks (10–8)	Borbón (2–4)	Anderson (17)	22,383	65–70

September: 10–10 (Home: 6–5; Away: 4–5)

#	Date	Opponent	Score	Win	Loss	Save	Attendance	Record
136	September 1	Tigers	3–1	Lyon (4–2)	Weaver (10–14)	Plesac (1)	22,052	66–70
137	September 2	Tigers	11–0	Loaiza (10–11)	Lima (4–6)		24,146	67–70
138	September 3	Yankees	7–5	Wohlers (1–0)	Koch (2–5)	Mendoza (6)	28,404	67–71
139	September 4	Yankees	14–0	Carpenter (9–11)	Pettitte (14–9)		20,036	68–71
140	September 5	Yankees	4–3	Clemens (19–1)	Escobar (6–6)	Rivera (44)	29,235	68–72
141	September 7	@ Tigers	2–1	Lyon (5–2)	Lima (4–7)	Koch (31)	28,083	69–72
142	September 8	@ Tigers	4–3	Murray (1–4)	Halladay (3–2)	Anderson (18)	29,158	69–73
143	September 9	@ Tigers	6–3	Carpenter (10–11)	Cornejo (3–3)		24,652	70–73
–	September 11	@ Orioles	Postponed (September 11 attacks) Rescheduled for October 1					
–	September 12	@ Orioles	Postponed (September 11 attacks) Rescheduled for October 2					
–	September 13	@ Orioles	Postponed (September 11 attacks) Rescheduled for October 3					
–	September 14	Indians	Postponed (September 11 attacks) Rescheduled for October 5					
–	September 15	Indians	Postponed (September 11 attacks) Rescheduled for October 6					
–	September 16	Indians	Postponed (September 11 attacks) Rescheduled for October 7					
144	September 18	Orioles	8–5	Plesac (4–4)	Julio (1–1)	Koch (32)	18,604	71–73
145	September 19	Orioles	4–1	Halladay (4–2)	Maduro (3–6)	Koch (33)	31,303	72–73
146	September 20	Orioles	12–6	Parrish (1–1)	File (3–3)		21,895	72–74
147	September 21	Devil Rays	7–4	Rekar (2–13)	Lyon (5–3)	Yan (18)	25,344	72–75
148	September 22	Devil Rays	8–7	Coco (1–0)	Colomé (1–2)	Koch (34)	24,691	73–75
149	September 23	Devil Rays	1–0	Kennedy (6–8)	Escobar (6–7)	Yan (19)	31,351	73–76
150	September 24	@ Indians	3–2 (11)	File (4–3)	Báez (5–2)	Eyre (1)	32,425	74–76
151	September 25	@ Indians	11–7	Riske (2–0)	Plesac (4–5)		35,729	74–77
–	September 26	@ Indians	Postponed (rain) Rescheduled for October 5 ‡					
152	September 27	@ Devil Rays	5–1	Colomé (2–2)	Eyre (0–2)		13,045	74–78
153	September 28	@ Devil Rays	6–1	Rekar (3–13)	Escobar (6–8)	Phelps (5)	10,586	74–79
154	September 29	@ Devil Rays	5–2	Bierbrodt (2–4)	Halladay (4–3)	Yan (20)	17,635	74–80
155	September 30	@ Devil Rays	6–5 (12)	Quantrill (11–2)	Creek (2–5)	Eyre (2)	14,217	75–80

October: 5–2 (Home: 2–1; Away: 3–1)

#	Date	Opponent	Score	Win	Loss	Save	Attendance	Record
156	October 1	@ Orioles	1–0	Loaiza (11–11)	Bauer (0–4)	Koch (35)	37,108	76–80
157	October 2	@ Orioles	4–3	Roberts (9–9)	DeWitt (0–2)		29,390	76–81
158	October 3	@ Orioles	7–6	Eyre (1–2)	Groom (1–4)	Koch (36)	33,705	77–81
159	October 5	Indians	5–0	Halladay (5–3)	Finley (8–7)			78–81
160	October 5	Indians	4–3 (11)	File (5–3)	Drese (1–2)		19,387	79–81
161	October 6	Indians	5–2	Carpenter (11–11)	Drew (0–2)	Quantrill (2)	20,762	80–81
162	October 7	Indians	3–2	Sabathia (17–5)	Lyon (5–4)	Rocker (4)	28,217	80–82

† At Hiram Bithorn Stadium in San Juan, Puerto Rico.
‡ Due to scheduling difficulties, this game was made up in Toronto.

== Player stats ==
= Indicates team leader

=== Batting ===
==== Starters by position ====
Note: Pos = Position; G = Games played; AB = At bats; H = Hits; Avg. = Batting average; HR = Home runs; RBI = Runs batted in

Pos	Player	G	AB	H	Avg.	HR	RBI
C	Darrin Fletcher	134	416	94	.226	11	56
1B	Carlos Delgado	162	574	160	.279	39	102
2B	Homer Bush	78	271	83	.306	3	27
SS	Alex Gonzalez	154	636	161	.253	17	76
3B	Tony Batista	72	271	56	.207	13	45
LF	Shannon Stewart	155	640	202	.316	12	60
CF	José Cruz Jr.	146	577	158	.274	34	88
RF	Raúl Mondesí	149	572	144	.252	27	84
DH	Brad Fullmer	146	522	143	.274	18	83

==== Other batters ====
Note: G = Games played; AB = At bats; H = Hits; Avg. = Batting average; HR = Home runs; RBI = Runs batted in

Player	G	AB	H	Avg.	HR	RBI
Felipe López	49	177	46	.260	5	23
Jeff Frye	74	175	43	.246	2	15
César Izturis	46	134	36	.269	2	9
Alberto Castillo	66	131	26	.198	1	4
Luis Lopez	41	119	29	.244	3	10
Brian Simmons	60	107	19	.178	2	8
Vernon Wells	30	96	30	.274	2	10
Chris Latham	43	73	20	.274	2	10
Chris Woodward	37	63	12	.190	2	5
Tony Fernández	48	59	18	.305	1	12
Ryan Freel	9	22	6	.273	0	3
Josh Phelps	8	12	0	.000	0	1

=== Pitching ===
==== Starting pitchers ====
Note: G = Games pitched; IP = Innings pitched; W = Wins; L = Losses; ERA = Earned run average; SO = Strikeouts

Player	G	IP	W	L	ERA	SO
Chris Carpenter	34	215.2	11	11	4.09	157
Esteban Loaiza	36	190.0	11	11	5.02	110
Joey Hamilton	22	122.1	5	8	5.89	82
Chris Michalak	24	115.0	6	7	4.62	57
Steve Parris	19	105.2	4	6	4.60	49
Roy Halladay	17	105.1	5	3	3.16	96
Brandon Lyon	11	63.0	5	4	4.29	35

==== Other pitchers ====
Note: G = Games pitched; IP = Innings pitched; W = Wins; L = Losses; ERA = Earned run average; SO = Strikeouts

Player	G	IP	W	L	ERA	SO
Kelvim Escobar	59	126.0	6	8	3.50	121
Pasqual Coco	7	14.1	1	0	4.40	9

==== Relief pitchers ====
Note: G = Games pitched; W = Wins; L = Losses; SV = Saves; ERA = Earned run average; SO = Strikeouts

Player	G	W	L	SV	ERA	SO
Billy Koch	69	2	5	36	4.80	55
Paul Quantrill	80	11	2	2	3.04	58
Pedro Borbón Jr.	71	2	4	0	3.71	45
Dan Plesac	62	4	5	1	3.57	68
Bob File	60	5	3	0	3.27	38
Scott Eyre	17	1	2	2	3.45	16
Matt DeWitt	16	0	2	0	3.79	13
John Frascatore	12	1	0	0	2.20	9
Lance Painter	10	0	1	0	7.85	14
Kevin Beirne	5	0	0	0	12.86	5
Brian Bowles	2	0	0	0	0.00	4

== Award winners ==
All-Star Game

- Paul Quantrill, P

== Farm system ==
Level	Team	League	Manager
AAA	Syracuse SkyChiefs	International League	Omar Malavé
AA	Tennessee Smokies	Southern League	Rocket Wheeler
A	Dunedin Blue Jays	Florida State League	Marty Pevey
A	Charleston Alley Cats	South Atlantic League	Rolando Pino
A-Short Season	Auburn Doubledays	New York–Penn League	Paul Elliott
Rookie	Medicine Hat Blue Jays	Pioneer League	Tom Bradley
