= Kevin Beirne =

American baseball player (born 1974)

- Pitcher
- Born: January 1, 1974 (age 52); Houston, Texas, U.S.
- Batted: Left Threw: Right

Professional debut
- MLB: May 17, 2000, for the Chicago White Sox
- NPB: March 31, 2003, for the Osaka Kintesu Buffaloes

Last appearance
- MLB: September 28, 2002, for the Los Angeles Dodgers
- NPB: September 5, 2006, for the Chiba Lotte Marines

MLB statistics
- Win–loss record: 3–3
- Earned run average: 6.09
- Strikeouts: 63

NPB statistics
- Win–loss record: 21–33
- Earned run average: 4.27
- Strikeouts: 379
- Stats at Baseball Reference

Teams
- Chicago White Sox (2000); Toronto Blue Jays (2001); Los Angeles Dodgers (2002); Osaka Kintesu Buffaloes (2003–2004); Orix Buffaloes (2005); Chiba Lotte Marines (2006)

Kevin Patrick Beirne (born January 1, 1974) is an American former professional baseball pitcher.

He is the son of Jim Beirne, who played with the Houston Oilers and San Diego Chargers of the NFL from 1968 to 1976.

== Career ==
Beirne was a star outfielder and wide receiver for McCullough High School in The Woodlands, TX where he was a teammate of future NFL player Larry Izzo. In 1989 as a sophomore, Beirne caught 18 passes in a game against Westfield High School, at the time placing him second all-time in Texas high school football history for receptions in a single game. He was a first team all-state receiver his senior year and was ranked the #5 high school receiver in the class of '92 in Texas by the Austin American-Statesman. He signed with Texas A&M, where he played both baseball and football.

Drafted by the Chicago White Sox in the 11th round of the 1995 MLB amateur draft, Beirne switched from the outfield to pitching in part because a pitcher's schedule fit in better with his football. He did not begin to learn to pitch until he was 21 and playing professionally. Beirne would make his Major League Baseball debut with the Chicago White Sox on May 17, 2000. Beirne pitched 29 games, all but one of them in relief, for the White Sox that season. His lone start came in late September against the Boston Red Sox.

In January 2001, he was traded with Mike Williams, Brian Simmons, and Mike Sirotka to the Toronto Blue Jays for Matt DeWitt and David Wells. Beirne appeared in only five games for the Blue Jays in 2001 and was granted free agency after the season. He signed with the Los Angeles Dodgers in December and had his best and final Major League season for the Dodgers, posting a 3.41 ERA in 29 innings. His last three appearances in the Majors came as a starter.

Beirne played professionally in Japan from 2003 to 2006.
