= Chris Carpenter =

American baseball player (born 1975)

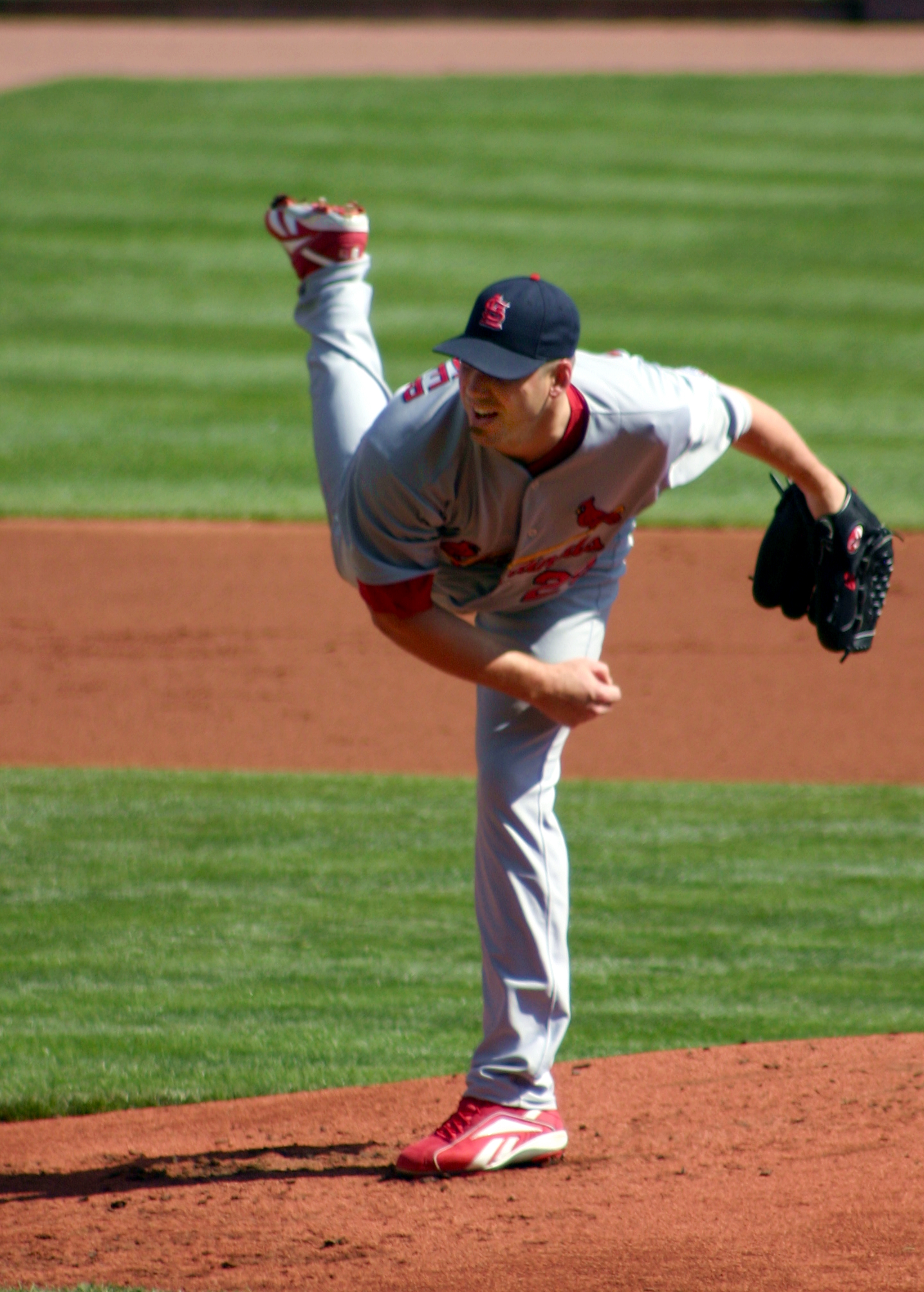
- Carpenter with the St. Louis Cardinals in 2009
- Pitcher
- Born: April 27, 1975 (age 51); Exeter, New Hampshire, U.S.
- Batted: Right Threw: Right

MLB debut
- May 12, 1997, for the Toronto Blue Jays

Last MLB appearance
- October 2, 2012, for the St. Louis Cardinals

MLB statistics
- Win–loss record: 144–94
- Earned run average: 3.76
- Strikeouts: 1,697
- Stats at Baseball Reference

Teams
- Toronto Blue Jays (1997–2002); St. Louis Cardinals (2004–2012)

Career highlights and awards
- 3× All-Star (2005, 2006, 2010); 2× World Series champion (2006, 2011); NL Cy Young Award (2005); NL Comeback Player of the Year (2009); NL ERA leader (2009); St. Louis Cardinals Hall of Fame

Christopher John Carpenter (born April 27, 1975) is an American former professional baseball pitcher. He played 15 seasons in Major League Baseball (MLB) for the Toronto Blue Jays and St. Louis Cardinals from 1997 to 2012. A Cy Young Award winner and two-time World Series champion, he was also a three-time All-Star selection. Additionally, he was twice named the Sporting News National League Pitcher of the Year, and received votes for a number of Comeback Player of the Year awards after surmounting various injuries.

The Blue Jays selected Carpenter in the first round of the 1993 amateur draft from Trinity High School in New Hampshire. He made his MLB debut for Toronto in 1997. However, injuries and ineffectiveness delayed his career before the Blue Jays released him in 2002. After the Cardinals signed him, he emerged as an ace in 2004, winning the Cy Young Award in 2005 and helping lead the Cardinals to World Series titles in 2006 and 2011. For much of his career, Carpenter relied on a cutter that produced a heavy bore and finished with a sharp drop, a 12-to-6 curveball, and a sinker.

Multiple injuries that were deemed career-threatening—including three surgeries on his elbow, two on his shoulder and another on his rib cage—caused Carpenter to miss nearly five full seasons. However, he rehabilitated and returned to pitch after each of these injuries. In nine seasons playing for the Cardinals, he won 95 regular-season games and compiled a 3.07 ERA in 197 starts and 1348 2/3 innings pitched. His .683 winning percentage during that period led the Major Leagues. In 18 postseason starts, he won 10 games with a 3.00 ERA over 108 innings.

== Early life ==
Christopher John Carpenter was born on April 27, 1975, in Exeter, New Hampshire, but grew up in Raymond, New Hampshire, later moving to Bedford. He played in Little League Baseball, Babe Ruth League, and American Legion Baseball. While attending Trinity High School in Manchester, New Hampshire, he was selected all-state for three years in both baseball and hockey. As a junior in 1992, his baseball team won the state championship. He was selected for The Boston Globe All-Scholastic team as a senior. In 1993, his senior campaign, he earned Athlete of the Year honors. He committed to play college baseball for Creighton.

== Professional career ==
=== Draft and minor leagues ===
The Toronto Blue Jays selected Carpenter in the first round as the 15th overall pick of the 1993 Major League Baseball draft; he was chosen as a compensation pick from the Texas Rangers for signing Tom Henke. He was the first player from New Hampshire ever taken in the first round of the draft. He signed for $580,000. Standing 6 ft 6 in (1.98 m), scouts saw potential in his size, projectability, low-90s fastball, and power curveball. However, he needed to develop his control and changeup—he consistently struggled with his control early in his career. He began his professional career in 1994 in Minor League Baseball with the Medicine Hat Blue Jays of the short-season Pioneer League. In his debut against the Great Falls Dodgers, he tossed six scoreless innings of one-hit ball, fanning nine along the way. When he defeated the Lethbridge Mounties, he claimed the July 2 Pitcher of the Week award. His early success continued throughout the season as he finished with a 2.56 earned run average (ERA) with 80 strikeouts (SO), 39 bases on balls (BB) and 76 hits allowed in 84 2/3 innings pitched (IP). He ended the season with a win–loss record of 6–3 and turned in the league's third-lowest ERA. He was also picked as the Pioneer League's number-three prospect by league managers, behind Aaron Boone and Ray Brown.

The Blue Jays promoted Carpenter to the Class-A Advanced Dunedin Blue Jays of Florida State League in 1995. Baseball America rated him the #100 prospect in the minor leagues before the season. He made 15 starts and yielded a 2.17 ERA in 99 1/3 innings. In 13 of those starts, he yielded three or fewer earned runs (ER). However, he posted a poor strikeout-to-walk ratio (K/BB) of 1.12, with 56 strikeouts and 50 walks. After a promotion to the AA Knoxville Blue Jays of the Southern League, he struggled with a 5.18 ERA, 53 strikeouts and 31 for 1.17 K/BB.

Returning to Knoxville the next season, Carpenter's Baseball America rating moved up to #82 among all minor leaguers, and was third in the organization. Pitching against the Carolina Mudcats on May 17, he struck out six batters in the sixth and seventh innings, and 10 total in a 5–0 win. For the month of May, he was Knoxville's Pitcher of the Month after allowing a 1.91 ERA and a 3–0 record. He spent the entire season there, starting 28 games, pitching 171 1/3 innings, allowing 161 hits, 75 earned runs, and 91 walks while striking out 150 and compiling a 1.61 strikeout-to-walk ratio. He struck out eight or more batters in nine different games and led the club in starts, innings pitched and strikeouts. The strikeout total tied him for third in club history behind Alex Sanchez' 166 recorded in 1988 and were third in the organization. Playing for the Phoenix Desert Dogs in the off-season Arizona Fall League (AFL), he posted a 2–0 record in 10 starts, 2.33 ERA (second in the AFL) and 43 strikeouts (third). He was named that club's most valuable player (MVP). His command continued to be problematic, although his curve and changeup improved.

In 1997, Baseball America promoted Carpenter's prospect ranking to 28th in the minor leagues. He started the season with the AAA Syracuse SkyChiefs of the International League, where he made his first seven starts of the season for a 3.88 ERA and 1–3 record. The Blue Jays purchased his contract on May 10, conferring his first major-league call-up.

=== Toronto Blue Jays (1997–2002) ===
Carpenter made his Major League Baseball (MLB) debut as a starter against the Minnesota Twins on May 12, 1997, completing three innings with eight hits, seven runs, and three walks while striking out five in a 12–2 loss. His first strikeout victim was Paul Molitor. At 22 years and 18 days old, he became the sixth-youngest starting pitcher for the Blue Jays. After two more appearances with a 12.71 ERA and 0–2 record, he returned to Syracuse. Carpenter's second round at Syracuse consisted of 12 more starts, including a seven inning complete game–shutout against the Richmond Braves on May 28. Totaling 19 games started at Syracuse in 1997, he pitched 120 innings, allowed 113 hits, and a 4.20 ERA. He posted 97 strikeouts with 53 walks for a 1.83 K/BB, his best figure since playing at Medicine Hat. However, his home run (HR) rate jumped after surrendering 16 home runs—a rate of 1.2 home runs per nine innings (HR/9). His previous high (0.7) was at Knoxville in 1996.

The Blue Jays recalled Carpenter from Syracuse on July 29, where he remained in the starting rotation for the remainder of the season. Losing his first five MLB decisions, Carpenter defeated the Chicago White Sox 6–5 on August 19 for his first major league win. He pitched his first MLB complete game-shutout on September 9 in a 2–0 victory over the Anaheim Angels. In each of his final nine starts of the season, Carpenter lowered his season ERA with the Blue Jays. In that duration, he allowed 22 earned runs in 60 innings for a 3.30 ERA and was credited with a 3–3 record. He finished his rookie season with a 3–7 record and a 5.09 ERA.

Performance struggles plagued Carpenter early in 1998. After just 10 innings with a combined 9.00 ERA in his first two starts, the Blue Jays moved him into the bullpen, where he remained until the end of May. On May 18, he totaled four innings and struck out six, which was a season-high for Toronto relievers. That stage included his total relief work for the season, where he made nine appearances and completed 22 2/3 innings, allowing a 2.38 ERA and carrying a 1–0 record. After Carpenter returned to the starting rotation, he earned a four-hit complete game-shutout on July 4 against the Tampa Bay, his first complete game and shutout of the season. 12 days later, he struck out a season-high 10—and then-career high—against the White Sox.

Facing the Texas Rangers on August 4, he walked a career-high seven in an 11–9 loss. He won three games in a row from August 11–21. His September totals were a 3–0 record and 2.55 ERA in five starts and 35 1/3 innings with just nine walks and 26 strikeouts. Carpenter's finish to the season proved superior to the beginning; in eight of his final ten starts, he was charged three earned runs or fewer. His K/9 rate of 6.99 was 10th in the American League (AL). However, his home and road performances were uneven; in Toronto his ERA was 3.66 and his road ERA 5.24. He also won six of his last seven decisions as the Blue Jays made a late push for a playoff spot. However, Toronto missed the playoffs, finishing four games behind the Boston Red Sox for the AL wild card. With a 12–7 record and 4.37 ERA, his 12 wins tied Pat Hentgen for the second-highest total on the club.

Carpenter battled through an injury-plagued 1999 season. Initially, he continued the skillful finish from the season before, allowing three or fewer earned runs in his first nine starts, and was credited with a 3–4 record and 3.02 ERA. His first loss of the season came in a 1–0 decision in Baltimore on April 10. His second start of the season resulted in an 11–1 complete game two-hitter at home on April 15 against Tampa Bay. For the month of April, his performance included a 2–1 record and 2.55 ERA. However, the results reversed in May; he was 1–4 in six starts with a 4.50 ERA. Pitching elbow inflammation placed him on the DL from June 3–28. After returning to play, he won the next five decisions of eight starts through August 11. He shut out Tampa Bay on July 3, the third of his career, and allowed just three hits. His season output at the All-Star break was a 3.24 ERA with a 6–5 record. He remained effective in June and throughout July, allowing 20 earned runs in 49 1/3 innings for a 3.62 ERA.

However, Carpenter's performance waned following the All-Star break; in ten starts, his record was 3–3 with a 6.31 ERA. Carpenter's August ERA was 6.46 and his season ended early on September 16 when Dr. James Andrews performed surgery to remove a bone spur. He finished with a 9–8 record, 4.38 ERA in 150 innings and 24 starts. He allowed 177 hits, a rate of 10.6 hits per nine innings pitched (H/9), 1.500 walks plus hits per inning pitched (WHIP) and one HR/9. In 16 of 24 starts, he allowed three earned runs or fewer. Just three of nine baserunners successfully stole a base. His home and road performances also evened from the season before—his ERA at home was 4.21 and 4.54 on the road.

Although Carpenter found significantly improved health the following season, he struggled through the statistically worst season of his career. He lost his first three starts, in which he pitched just 16 innings, allowing 18 hits, six home runs and ten walks for a 7.31 ERA. His first win of the season was an 8–3 complete game margin against the New York Yankees on April 21. Carpenter won his next start and finished April with a 5.25 ERA and 2–3 records. Opposing Red Sox ace Pedro Martínez—the eventual Cy Young Award winner that year—in Boston on May 23, Carpenter emerged victorious in a 3–2 decision. The only point in the season in which he had a winning record, however, was on June 14 when the Blue Jays defeated the Detroit Tigers 8–1, putting his personal record at 6–5. He went 3–7 the rest of the way. Ironically, he allowed a career-high nine earned runs against Detroit in his next start. He would again allow nine earned runs against Baltimore two starts later. The Blue Jays moved him to the bullpen where he made his first relief appearance in more than two years on July 22. He returned to the rotation for two starts, but lasted just 3 1/3 innings both times.

At the beginning of August, after posting a 7–10 record with a 6.99 ERA, he was again shifted from the starting rotation to the bullpen. He made six more relief appearances, winning two, but allowed a 6.63 ERA. His eighth win came in 4 1/3 innings of scoreless relief against the Kansas City Royals. Carpenter pitched another 5 1/3 innings in relief for his ninth win on August 13 in opposition to the Minnesota Twins, striking out seven, which matched an AL season-high in relief. From August 29 to September 28, he returned to the rotation. In a September 16 contest against the Chicago White Sox, a ball hit off the bat of José Valentín struck him in the face, forcing him from the game. He returned to the mound twelve days later. However, in his final start that season, he was the losing pitcher in a 23–1 defeat to the Orioles, yielding four earned runs in three innings. With improved health, Carpenter pitched a new career-high 175 1/3 innings, but surrendered an AL-high 122 earned runs for a 6.26 ERA, by far the highest of his career. He allowed 204 hits a 1.637 WHIP, and 30 home runs, or 1.5 HR/9. His starting ERA was 6.55. His home ERA ballooned to 7.53 from 4.21 of the season before while his road ERA was 5.25.

Beginning his 2001 season with 13 scoreless innings—a career high—he won his first start 11–0 against Tampa with 11 strikeouts (also a new career high). His April totals included a 3.15 ERA and 2–1 record. He tossed a six-hitter in a 4–0 victory over the White Sox on May 29 for his first complete game and shutout of the season. He gained three wins in May, his first three-win month since September 1998. At the end of June, Carpenter had a 7–4 record with a 3.67 ERA. However, he lost his next seven decisions in ten starts from July 1 to August 19 to fall to 7–11 and a 4.59 ERA. During that stretch he allowed 12 home runs and 40 earned runs in 56 2/3 innings for an ERA of 6.35. Lee Stevens became his 500th career strikeout casualty in a July 6 game against Montreal. The losing streak ended on August 24 with seven shutout innings against Baltimore. On September 4, his third complete game of the season was a 14–0 defeat of the Yankees in a contest in which he set a career high with 12 strikeouts. He won his last four decisions in eight starts, allowing just 14 earned runs in 51 innings for a 2.52 ERA. He finished with a record of 11–11 and an ERA of 4.09. His 11 victories tied him with Esteban Loaiza and Paul Quantrill for the team high, and he was considered one of the Blue Jays' starters of the future along with Roy Halladay. Prior to the All-Star break, he was 7–5 with a 3.99 ERA. After, he was 4–6 with a 4.21 ERA. He allowed 29 home runs on the season, which was the fourth-highest total in the AL. His two shutouts placed fourth and three complete games ninth.

The Blue Jays named Carpenter their opening day starter for the first time in his career on April 1, 2002, at Fenway Park against the Red Sox. He was rocked in this start, recording 2 1/3 innings and allowing six runs. He received a no-decision as Toronto prevailed, 12–11. The Blue Jays placed him on the DL due to a shoulder injury after that start. Making his second start on April 21, Carpenter lasted only three innings, allowing three runs against the New York Yankees. He took the loss as New York won, 9–2. However, he was back on the DL after that start due to shoulder tendonitis. After recovering, Carpenter made six rehab starts between Tennessee and Syracuse. He allowed seven home runs in his first four starts covering 16 innings. Carpenter's first win of the season came against the Arizona Diamondbacks, after completing five innings and allowing two runs.

Carpenter landed on the DL in August for the third time in 2002, where he remained for the rest of the season. Shoulder surgery followed in September to repair a torn glenoid labrum. Surgeons inserted three tacks to anchor the labrum. He allowed four home runs in his last 58 innings. Carpenter finished the year 4–5 with a 5.28 ERA. After the season—and plagues of injuries and control issues that did not fully resolve over his career in the Toronto organization—the Blue Jays removed him from the 40-man roster and offered him a minor league, incentive-based deal. Carpenter refused, allowing him to become a free agent.

=== St. Louis Cardinals (2003–13) ===
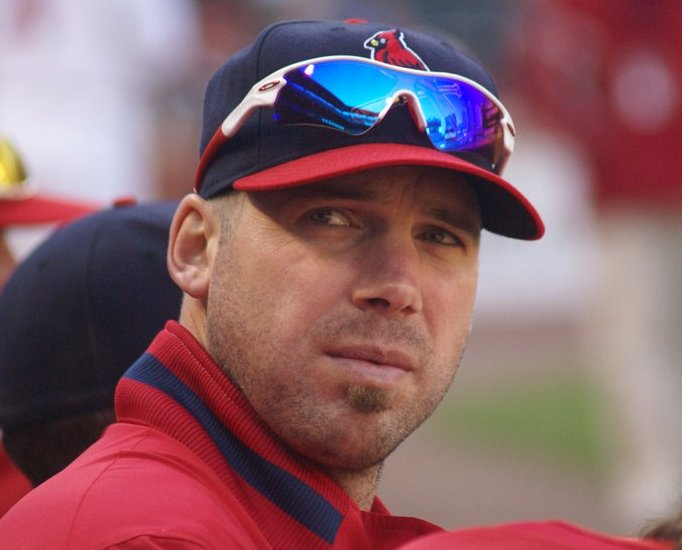
Carpenter with the Cardinals

==== Recovery from shoulder problems and Comeback Player of the Year (2004) ====
The St. Louis Cardinals signed Carpenter on December 13, 2002, while he was still recovering from elbow surgery in anticipation he would be ready by the middle of the 2003 season. He made eight minor league starts as rehabilitation assignments before it was discovered he had torn his labrum again after the pins anchoring it had destabilized. Scar tissue developed, necessitating further surgery and a DL stay for the remainder of the season. On November 3, 2003, the Cardinals declined Carpenter's option for 2004 worth $2 million, instead buying him out for $200,000 and making him a free agent again. The two sides negotiated on a new contract and re-signed for $300,000 on December 3, 2003.

Fully recovered for the 2004 season, Carpenter became a regular in the Cardinals' starting rotation. The first 11 starts of his Cardinals career included a 3.42 ERA and a 7–1 record. On April 9, he earned his first Cardinals win and 50th of his career against the Arizona Diamondbacks in a 13–7 score. He matched up against the Houston Astros and former Blue Jays rotation mate Roger Clemens on May 28, pitching eight scoreless innings while allowing just two hits. He did not factor in the decision as the Cardinals won 2–1 in 10 innings. In May, Carpenter started five games and was credited with a 4–0 record and a 2.62 ERA; eventually his win streak reached six games.

On July 5 against the Cincinnati Reds, he struck out eight, including Adam Dunn for the 700th of his career, in a 4–1 victory. He established a new career-high 13th win in the second game of an August 20 doubleheader against the Pittsburgh Pirates. In an August 26 rematch against Cincinnati, he struck out 11 in an eight-inning complete game, his only one of the season. Carpenter walked just 22 while striking out 113 in his last 19 starts. A nerve problem in his right bicep ended his season early in September.

For the season, Carpenter established then-career bests with 15 victories, a 3.46 ERA, 7.5 K/9 and allowed less than one hit per inning for the first time as a Major Leaguer. He tallied 182 innings, his highest total since 2001. His ERA placed thirteenth in the NL, 1.137 WHIP fourth, 1.879 BB/9 sixth, K/BB ratio of 4.000 placed fifth, and overall record of 15–5 with a .750 winning percentage ranked second. The Cardinals staff finished second in the league in ERA (3.75) as they won a National League-high 105 games, their most since 1944, and first NL pennant since 1987. The nerve problem caused Carpenter to miss the postseason, including what would have been his first World Series appearance, which the Boston Red Sox won. Carpenter won the National League Comeback Player of the Year Awards from the Sporting News and the Major League Baseball Players Association (MLBPA) Players Choice Award series.

==== Cy Young Award winner (2005) ====
The Cardinals called on Carpenter for his first Opening Day start for the club in 2005, and second of his career. He faced off against the Astros for his first for the Cardinals and second overall, allowing four hits in seven innings in a 7–3 win. On April 15, he signed a two-year extension through 2007 with a vesting option for 2008. He earned his first shutout in three years against the Chicago Cubs on April 21, and, on April 27, tied a career-high by striking out 12 Milwaukee Brewers in 7 2/3 innings.

On June 14, Carpenter hurled a one-hit shutout against the team that drafted him, the Blue Jays, while striking out 10 in a 7–0 win. It was the 19th complete game one-hitter in Cardinals history. That contest launched the first of his 17 consecutive starts the Cardinals won, a streak that spanned until September 23. Other streaks coincided with that game. One was a 13-game personal winning streak with a 1.36 ERA over 16 starts, during which he yielded just 20 earned runs in 132 1/3 innings. Second, he was the first pitcher in the live-ball era (since 1920) to go undefeated in 16 consecutive starts, complete seven innings or more, and allow three or fewer runs in each game. Third, dating back to May 7, he also produced 22 consecutive quality starts. Fourth, he won his first 12 road starts of the season. Fifth, he was the first NL pitcher to win 10 consecutive road outings since Bob Gibson in 1970. Two starts after playing against Toronto, Carpenter picked up his third complete-game shutout against Pittsburgh, striking out 11 in an 8–0 win. He allowed four earned runs in 40 innings for a major-league leading 0.90 ERA in June. From June 25 to July 6, he threw 21 2/3 consecutive scoreless innings, a career high.

With 13 wins before the All-Star break, Carpenter became just the third Cardinals pitcher ever to achieve the feat, following Joaquín Andújar in 1984 and 1985, and Kent Bottenfield in 1999. He was picked to start an All-Star Game at Comerica Park in Detroit, the first Cardinals pitcher in 32 years since Rick Wise to do so. He pitched one scoreless inning. On another occasion facing Clemens on July 17, Carpenter struck out nine Astros while giving up just three hits and no walks as St. Louis won, 3–0. It was his sixth consecutive start allowing one or no runs. He yielded five earned runs over 40 2/3 innings in July for a 1.11 July ERA (second in MLB), 33 strikeouts, seven walks and 24 hits, and one home run. Carpenter became the first Cardinals pitcher since Andújar in 1985 to record 15 wins before August 1. Carpenter's August resulted in a 4–0 record, 2.17 ERA, 38 strikeouts and six walks in six starts. On September 3, he won a complete game in Houston to become the majors' first 20-game winner. It was his 28th start, making him the fastest Cardinal to win 20 since Dizzy Dean in his 23rd start in 1934. With a 2–0 record, 1.69 ERA, 13 strikeouts and 16 2/3 innings, Carpenter won his first NL Player of the Week Award for the week ending September 4. On September 23, the Cardinals' streak of winning 17 consecutive starts by Carpenter ended with a 9–6 loss to Milwaukee.

For the second consecutive season, the Cardinals repeated as Central division champions, and won at least 100 games with the best record in the National League. Carpenter set career bests with a 2.83 ERA, 213 strikeouts, 241 2/3 innings, seven complete games, four shutouts and a 21–5 record. as the club won 26 of his 33 regular season starts. While not a leader in any one major statistical category in 2005—aside from leading MLB in complete games—he was the only pitcher to finish in the top five in all of MLB in the pitching Triple Crown categories (ERA, wins and strikeouts). In road games, he went 12–1 in 15 starts with a 2.90 ERA, ranking fifth in the NL. The .923 winning percentage on the road is highest in franchise history for all pitchers with at least 10 wins on the road. He was the first Cardinals pitcher to strike out 200 in a season since José DeLeón in 1989.

Finally healthy for an entire season, Carpenter pitched in the postseason for the first time in his career, debuting on October 4 against the Padres in Game 1 of the National League Division Series (NLDS). In six shutout innings, he earned the win in an 8–5 margin, but left due to hand cramping. The Cardinals defeated the Padres in the NLDS but fell to the Astros in the National League Championship Series (NLCS). His combined postseason totals were a 2–0 record with a 2.14 ERA in 21 innings.

After winning several awards for his regular season performance, Carpenter was the National League Cy Young Award winner. He amassed 19 first-place votes for 132 points while runner-up Dontrelle Willis of the Florida Marlins garnered 112 total points. Carpenter became just the second pitcher in team history to win a Cy Young Award since Gibson, who had last won in 1970. He won the Major League Baseball Players Association (MLBPA) Players Choice Award for the National League Outstanding Pitcher, and the Sporting News Award for the National League Pitcher of the Year. He also won the This Year in Baseball Starting Pitcher of the Year Award. To recognize his selection as the NL Outstanding Pitcher, MLBPA Trust contributed $20,000 to Kristen's Gift in Lebanon, New Hampshire. The St. Louis chapter of the Baseball Writers' Association of America (BBWAA) selected him, along with Albert Pujols, as co-St. Louis Baseball Man of the Year Award winners. He finished eighth in the NL MVP voting, the highest placement of all pitchers.

==== First World Series championship (2006) ====
For the second consecutive season in 2006, Carpenter was the Cardinals' Opening Day starter. At Philadelphia on April 3, he earned the victory after posting five innings in a 13–5 margin. With nine strikeouts in six innings against the Cubs on April 8, he departed with a 2–0 lead, but earned a no-decision as the Cubs won, 3–2. In an April 14 contest against Cincinnati, he allowed just one run in eight innings, but Aaron Harang—who had the game-winning hit off Carpenter—and the bullpen muzzled the Cardinals on just five hits for a 1–0 Reds triumph. Carpenter stifled the Pittsburgh Pirates for eight scoreless innings on April 19 at PNC Park and allowed just a pair of hits. After hitting the leadoff hitter, he retired 15 consecutive batters before surrendering a single in the sixth inning. In that inning, he fanned Nate McLouth for his 1,000th career strikeout.

Making his 200th career start against the Pirates on April 24, Carpenter earned the decision in a 7–2 win. On June 13 against the Pirates, he struck out a personal and club season-high 13 batters, allowing just three hits in a 2–1 win. He was voted to his second All-Star Game in July. He picked up his first victory against the last remaining club he had not yet defeated—besides the Cardinals, whom he never faced in his career—the Atlanta Braves on July 4. He worked five innings in a rain-interrupted outing against the Braves on July 4 at Turner Field for that first career victory. In a complete game-shutout of the Los Angeles Dodgers on July 14, he allowed just two hits and struck out seven in a 5–0 win. It was his tenth career shutout and fifth as a Cardinal. Following that contest, Carpenter was named the NL Player of the Week for the All Star-shortened week of July 13–16. His nine innings pitched paced the league and he was also tied for the league lead in ERA at 0.00.

Debuting in Coors Field on July 25 against the Rockies, Carpenter combined with Randy Flores and Jason Isringhausen for the Cardinals' first-ever shutout win (1–0) in Denver. Winless in his previous three starts after allowing 15 runs in 17 innings, he pitched a four-hitter against the Reds on August 15 for his 11th career shutout. Only one runner reached second base while Carpenter struck out six and walked none. The next start, he was the winning pitcher in a 5–3 victory over the Cubs, allowing two runs on seven innings. Along with teammate Chris Duncan, Carpenter was named NL co-Player of the Week for the week ending August 20. In two starts against the Reds and Cubs, he tallied 17 innings, was charged with a 1.06 ERA and struck out 13 without issuing a walk.

On September 11, Carpenter shut out the Astros in a 7–0 final score for his fourth complete game and third shutout of the season. It was also his 50th win as a Cardinal. He became the third member of the St. Louis Cardinals pitching staff to gain his 100th career win in 2006, joining Jeff Suppan and Mark Mulder in a September 16 matchup against the San Francisco Giants. Facing former teammate Matt Morris for the first time, the Cardinals were victorious, 6–1. Carpenter used a newly evolved curveball over seven completed innings, allowing the lone run in the eighth inning. That run stopped a personal streak of 22 scoreless innings at home. Winning his third National League Player of the Week Award for the week ending September 16, he allowed just a 0.56 ERA with 15 strikeouts and a 2–0 record. Included in those totals were the games against Houston and San Francisco. For the season, he posted a 3.09 ERA with 15 wins in 221 2/3 innings. His three shutouts led the Major Leagues and 1.069 walks plus hits per inning pitched (WHIP) led the National League.

With the Cardinals facing the Padres in the NLDS for the second consecutive season, Carpenter won both his starts and yielded a 2.03 ERA while striking out 12 in 13 1/3 innings. He was less effective against the New York Mets in the NLCS, allowing a 5.73 ERA while losing one of two starts. Carpenter made his first World Series start in Game 3 against the Detroit Tigers on October 24 at Busch Stadium in St. Louis. He pitched eight shutout innings, allowing no runs on three hits and striking out six. Per the Elias Sports Bureau, that performance made him the first pitcher in Cardinals history to pitch eight innings and allow no walks and no more than three hits in a World Series contest. Just two other pitchers in the prior 20 seasons had accomplished the feat: Greg Maddux (1995) and Clemens (2000). The Cardinals prevailed in five games over the Tigers, giving him his first World Series ring. Carpenter finished third in the NL Cy Young balloting behind Brandon Webb and Trevor Hoffman, and 19th in the NL MVP voting, second to Hoffman among pitchers. His teammates voted him as that season's Darryl Kile Good Guy Award winner for the Cardinals. On December 4, 2006, the Cardinals announced they re-signed Carpenter to a five-year, US$65 million deal, keeping him with the team through 2011, with a $12 million option for 2012.

==== 2007–09 ====
From 2007 to 2008, elbow problems persisted, causing Carpenter to miss nearly all of both seasons, and the Cardinals missed the playoffs in that period. He returned in 2009, helping to lead the Cardinals to a Central division title. He made his third consecutive Opening Day start on April 1, 2007, facing off against Tom Glavine of the Mets. The Mets won, 6–1, giving Carpenter his first career Opening Day loss. He missed his next start due to apparent elbow inflammation. The Cardinals placed him on the DL on April 9 for impingement syndrome and moderate arthritis. On May 5, the team announced he would require surgery to trim bone spurs in the elbow.

After a rehabilitation start following the surgery, swelling and stiffness developed, and, on July 19, the Cardinals announced Carpenter would require Tommy John surgery to replace the medial collateral ligament of the right elbow and would miss approximately another 10 to 12 months. He made his next major league appearance one year later on July 30, 2008, against the Braves. He lasted four innings, gave up one run on five hits, walked two and struck out two. Despite receiving a no-decision, the Cardinals went on to win the game, 7–2. At one point in 2008, he began experiencing numbness in his pitching forearm, which lingered for the rest of his career, and transformed into weakness, intermittently shifting from his arm to his hands, neck, and facial muscles.

After making just four starts from 2007 to 2008, Carpenter returned for a one-hit performance on April 9 against Pittsburgh in his 2009 season debut. He shut them out for seven innings at Busch Stadium struck out seven. In his second start of the season on April 14, he strained the left side of his rib cage, prompting the club placed him on the 15-day DL. A magnetic resonance image (MRI) revealed an oblique tear.

On May 20, Carpenter returned after missing a month to make his 100th start for the Cardinals. He pitched five shutout innings against the Chicago Cubs, giving up just three hits, walking two, and striking out five in a 2–1 win. With that win, his winning percentage with the club increased to .726 (53–20), the highest ever by a Cardinals pitcher through his first 100 starts, surpassing John Tudor's 49–21 record (.700). He completed 19 total innings for the month of May and allowed just two earned runs for a 0.95 ERA; he also allowed just a 0.737 WHIP.

On June 4, he threw his 26th career complete game, and lowered his ERA for the season to 0.71, the lowest for any Cardinals' pitcher in the first six starts of a season, exceeding Harry Brecheen's mark of 0.75 in 1948. In July, he was 4–0 in five starts and 36 innings with a 1.75 ERA and 1.222 WHIP. He hurled seven shutout innings while striking out ten Reds on August 12. A 7–0 victory over San Diego at Petco Park on August 22 gave him his ninth win in ten starts with a 1.92 ERA in that span. It was also the unofficial 10,000th win in the Cardinals' all-time franchise history, dating back to the American Association era. The official total at the time, counted since their entry into the NL in 1892, was 9,219.

Carpenter won the National League Pitcher of the Month Award for August with a 5–0 record and 2.20 ERA in six starts. He threw a one-hitter on September 7 against the Brewers at Miller Park, striking out 10, and earning his first shutout since September 11, 2006. On October 1, he hit his first career home run, a grand slam, in a 13–0 rout of the Reds at Great American Ball Park, and doubled home two more runs. He became only the fourth pitcher since the advent of divisional play in 1969 with at least six runs batted in (RBI) in a game. That total broke the Cardinals' club record for pitchers which Gibson established with five on July 26, 1973.

For the year, Carpenter led the NL with a career-best 2.24 ERA in 192 2/3 innings and a major league-leading .810 winning percentage with 17 wins and just four losses. Further, he struck out 144 while walking just 38 batters, and allowed just seven home runs. His 0.3 HR/9 rate also led the major leagues and his K/BB rate of 3.79 placed eighth in the NL.

After the season, Carpenter won the NL Comeback Player of the Year Award by winning 27 of 30 first-place votes. He was the runner-up for the National League Cy Young Award. In one of the closest votes of the history of the award, winner Tim Lincecum garnered 100 total points while Carpenter had 94 despite being written in just nine of 30 first-place votes. He also finished 14th in the NL MVP voting, which was tops among all NL pitchers. For his performance in the 2009 season after missing nearly all of the previous season while recuperating from nerve ailments in his pitching arm and Tommy John surgery, he unanimously won the Tony Conigliaro Award.

==== 2010–11 ====
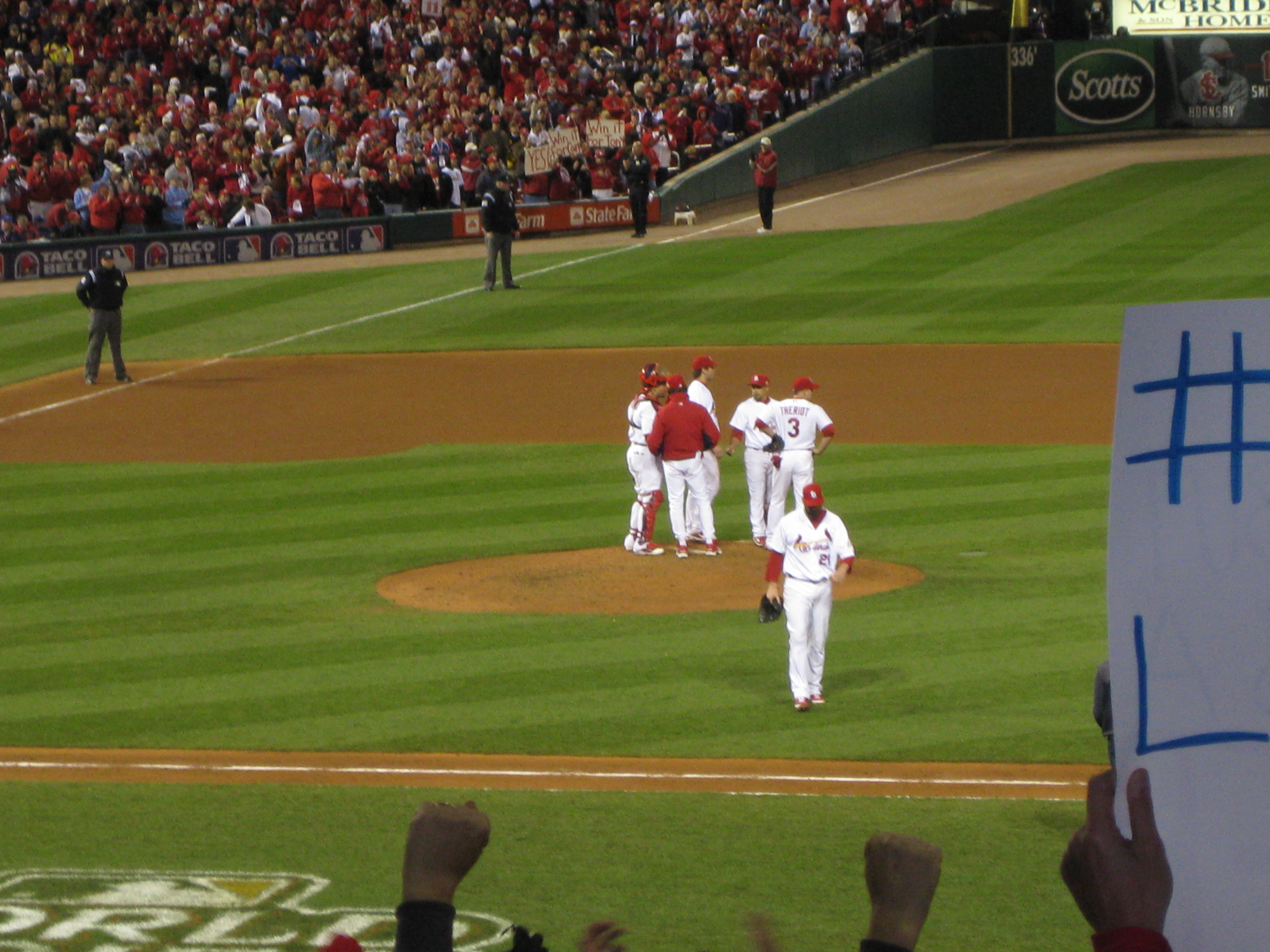
Carpenter being relieved in the top of the 7th, Game 7 of the 2011 World Series.

Early in the 2010 season, Carpenter began to experience increased symptoms related to the prior weakness and numbness in his pitching arm that was concentrated mainly in his shoulder. He gained relief through multiple remedies that included deep massage and muscle release that chiropractor Dr. Clayton Skaggs performed. The relief allowed him to play the entire season without a DL stay. However, over time, his condition became more resistant to treatment. He played in the All-Star Game, the third appearance of his career.

In an August game, Carpenter escalated a bench-clearing brawl with the Cincinnati Reds. After a heated exchange with Reds' manager Dusty Baker following an incident initiated by Cardinals' catcher Yadier Molina with the Reds' Brandon Phillips, the two teams began shoving and grappling with each other. Carpenter was fined as a result.

For the 2010 season, Carpenter finished with a 3.22 ERA, 235 innings, 179 strikeouts and 16–9 record. It was the only time in his Cardinals career in which he played the full season but missed the playoffs. He led the major leagues in games started (35) and was second in the NL in innings pitched. He also finished in the top ten in the NL in wins, winning percentage, walks per nine innings, batters faced and hit batsmen.

At the close of the 2011 regular season, the Cardinals called on Carpenter to consummate what St. Louis Post-Dispatch sportswriter Bernie Miklasz termed an "improbable comeback". The Cardinals were one game from realizing their quest of surmounting a 10 1/2 games-won deficit over the Atlanta Braves that had commenced on August 28. They had tied the Braves for the Wild Card lead entering the final game of the season on September 29. Carpenter started that game against the Houston Astros, securing an 8–0 victory behind his two-hit shutout. Meanwhile, the Philadelphia Philles defeated the Braves 4–3 in 13 innings, giving the Cardinals the wild card title and eliminating the Braves from the playoffs. The games-won deficit marked the largest lead surrendered with 32 left to play. For the season, Carpenter pitched an NL-leading 237 1/3 innings while posting a 3.45 ERA and leading the major leagues in starts with 34. He also struck out 191 batters, allowed a 1.256 WHIP, completed four games, and was ninth in the NL with 3.473 strikeout-to-walk ratio.

Incidentally, the Cardinals faced off against the Phillies in the five-game NLDS. On Friday, October 7, Carpenter started for the second time in the series for the finale in Philadelphia, matching up against former Blue Jays teammate and friend Roy Halladay. Carpenter defeated Halladay in a sensational 1–0, complete-game shutout where he allowed just three hits and received skilled defensive support. That game clinched the series and sent the Cardinals to the NLCS to face the Brewers. Carpenter started once, and the Cardinals also won this series.

Meeting the Texas Rangers in the World Series, Carpenter started Game 1. The Cardinals prevailed, 3–2, and he earned the decision. By winning his eighth career postseason game as a Cardinal, he surpassed Gibson for the all-time franchise lead. Carpenter also pitched Games 5 and Game 7. He completed six innings of the seventh game on three days rest, leading the Cardinals to a 6–2 win and his second career World Series win. It was also the third clincher of the season he pitched and won. His overall 2011 postseason totals included a 4–0 record and 3.30 ERA.

==== 2012–13 ====
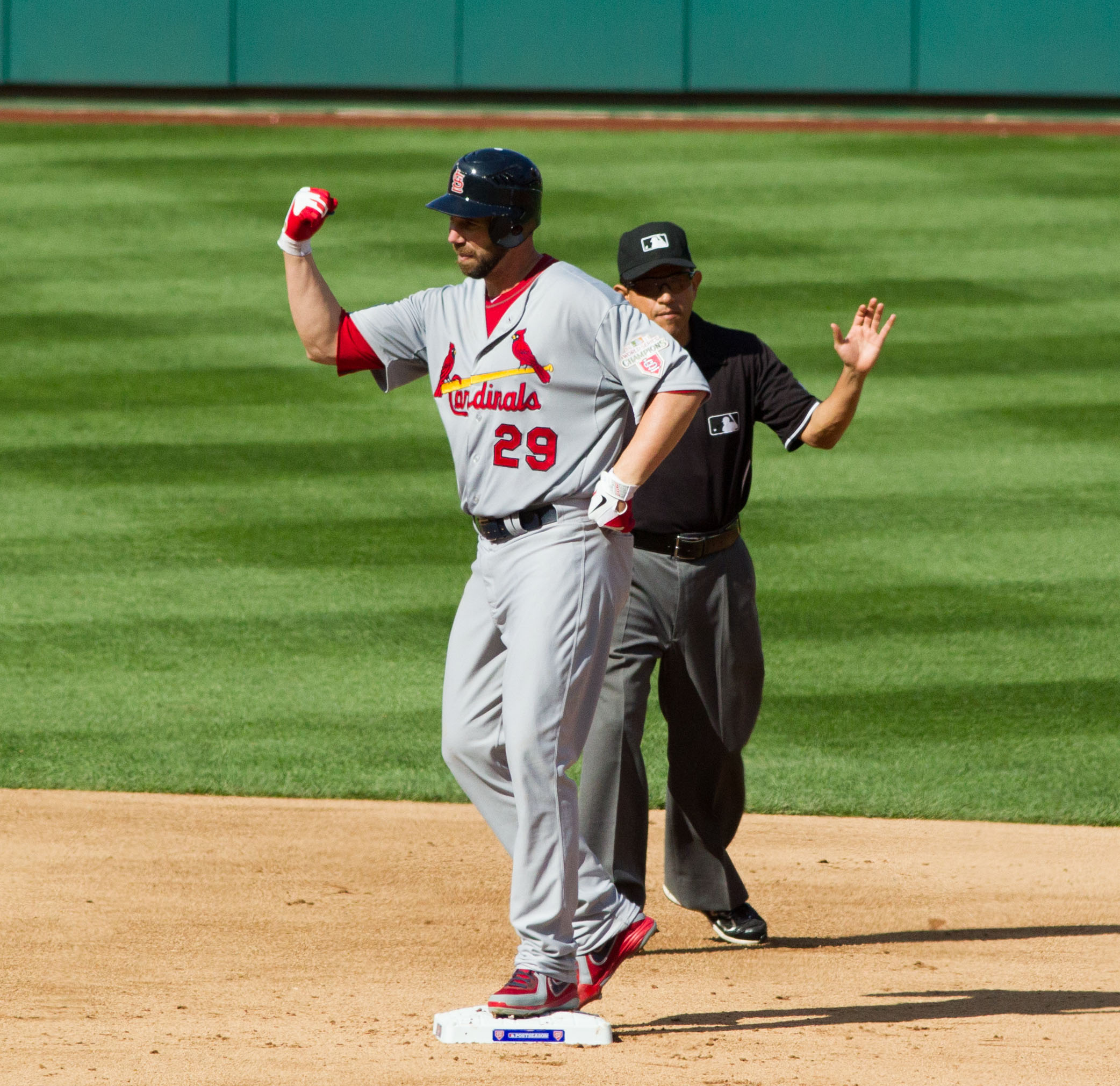
Carpenter flexes his surgically repaired arm and shoulder while on second base in NLDS Game 3, October 10, 2012.

After producing three successful seasons (2009–11) following two injury-plagued seasons (2007–08), Carpenter would again miss nearly all of two consecutive seasons. This time, they were his final two major league seasons under contract. He did not pitch for much of 2012 because of thoracic outlet syndrome (TOS), diagnosed on June 28 after a visit to a Dallas-area specialist. Initially, a three-month strengthening program to remedy shoulder weakness was the goal. However, the treatment failed, leaving surgical intervention as the only option. On July 3, the team and Carpenter announced he would have surgery to repair the TOS. It involved removal of his first rib, the amelioration of two scalene muscles in the neck and extrication of nerves within the brachial plexus. Initial recovery time was estimated at six months, meaning he would miss the remainder of the 2012 season and be ready for spring training the following February. Dr. Greg Pearl performed the surgery on July 19 and the procedure involved removal of a rib. Defying expectations, his speedy recovery allowed him to return to the mound in a September 21 game against the Cubs. According to Carpenter, "I worked my butt off to try and get back, and it worked out."

His postseason win on October 10 in the third game of the 2012 NLDS against the Washington Nationals made him the first winning pitcher in a postseason game at Nationals Park. The win gave him a 10–2 record, 2.88 ERA and 100 innings in 16 postseason starts. The 10 wins placed him seventh on MLB's all-time postseason win list at the time, just one behind Curt Schilling (11–2, 2.23 ERA) and Greg Maddux (11–14, 3.27 ERA). However, he allowed five runs—two earned—in only four innings to take the loss in Game 2 of the NLCS against the San Francisco Giants, and turned in an identical performance in the potentially-clinching Game 6. The Cardinals lost in seven games.

On February 5, 2013, an MLB.com report on the Cardinals official team website stated that Carpenter was considered unlikely to pitch for the team in the 2013 season, his final under his contract. According to Cardinals general manager John Mozeliak, Carpenter informed team officials he was again experiencing symptoms in his right shoulder that sidelined him for much of 2012, namely numbness, weakness, and general discomfort. In mid-January, he disclosed to reporters at the Cardinals Winter Warmup event that he'd experienced no problems with the shoulder in his off-season throwing routine. However, according to Mozeliak, several attempts by Carpenter to throw bullpen sessions had caused a resurfacing of the shoulder issue. Carpenter stated on February 11 he would not travel to spring training in Jupiter, Florida, deciding to stay in St. Louis fearing he could be a distraction. At a press conference that same day, he said he still held out hope of pitching in 2013, and refused to talk about retirement. On February 22, the team placed him on the 60-day disabled list.

He hoped to return to pitch out of the bullpen after stating on May 4 he was feeling good and resuming a throwing program. Mozeliak believed he could return in late June or early July. He threw a bullpen session of around 70 pitches on May 10, with all his pitch types, and said afterwards he felt good and was ready for his fifth session on May 13. He made two minor league rehab starts but was shut down because of continued discomfort. He did not pitch for the Cardinals in 2013. On October 13, his agent Bob LaMonte stated Carpenter would retire, and may pursue a career in the Cardinals organization. Mozeliak confirmed his retirement during a press conference on November 20, 2013.

== Post-playing career ==
The Cardinals announced in January 2014 that Carpenter would join the team's front office. Mozeliak said that he would work in scouting. He resigned the position after the 2014 season for personal reasons.

In October 2021, Carpenter joined the Los Angeles Angels organization as a mental skills coach for minor league pitchers.

== Pitching style ==
Like teammate Adam Wainwright, Carpenter's repertoire consisted mostly of sinkers (90–94 mph), cutters (87–90), and curveballs (74–77), with occasional four-seam fastballs and a changeup used against left-handed hitters. His curveball was his preferred pitch with two strikes. "He's just the entire package," manager Tony La Russa said. "He's got really tough stuff. He has a lot of pitches [and] can show a hitter one thing, mix it two or three times and show him something different, and he's competitive as all get-out. He's the complete package." He was also a good fielder, having pitched three full seasons (2001, 2006 and 2009) without making an error.

Carpenter's sinker generally averaged about 91.5 miles per hour (147.3 km/h) in 2011, his last full season, slightly lower than its average speed of 93 miles per hour (150 km/h) in 2009. His sinker and four-seam fastball combination averaged 92.4 miles per hour (148.7 km/h) in 2011. Against right-handed hitters, his sinker was most effective with horizontal movement rather than with marked sink. His cutter actually had more sink on it than his sinker, along with the effective, familiar cutting motion. It averaged between 86.5 and 88 mph over the last few years of his career. The curveball had significant downward movement, and, at or below 75 miles per hour (121 km/h), was slow for a pitcher who threw as hard as Carpenter did.

Carpenter has credited former pitching coach Dave Duncan with helping prompt him to rethink his pitching strategy. After arriving in St. Louis in 2003, he "was able to sit around and listen and watch (Duncan)," Carpenter stated. "When I was a young kid, I didn't think about up and down and things like that. I was just trying to throw the ball away, trying to throw the ball in, I wasn't thinking about throwing my curveball for strikes." When he won the 2005 Cy Young Award, he became the fourth pitcher to win with Duncan as coach, and the seventh overall in Duncan's playing and coaching career. "When I came here (St. Louis), (Duncan) talks about throwing the ball down in the strike zone and getting ahead and attacking the strike zone. All these things have helped me progress and be successful, and I owe him a lot for what I've done the last few years."

== Legacy, honors and accomplishments ==
As a pitcher who missed considerable playing time due to injury, Carpenter won three major Comeback Player of the Year awards in two separate seasons. Steve Adams of MLB Trade Rumors wrote that "injuries to Carpenter shortened what could have been one of the most impressive careers of a generation, but few were better than Carpenter when he was healthy. From 2004–11, [he] posted a 3.06 ERA with 7.3 K/9 and 2.0 BB/9 in 1331 2/3 innings." Said Mozeliak, "When you think back to everything this organization has been through in regard to his ups and downs, he will still go down as one of the greatest we've ever had. … We think back to his career and what an amazing one it was. He was part of so many highlights and I think he really created a culture of higher expectations." Chairman William DeWitt, Jr., remarked "Chris will always be remembered as the leader of the pitching staff during one of the great eras of Cardinals baseball."

Carpenter won one Cy Young Award and finished in the top three twice more. Despite reaching 28 or more starts in just six of his nine seasons with the St. Louis Cardinals, he won 95 games with a 3.07 ERA over 1348 1/3 innings. He is the franchise's all-time leader in strikeout-to-walk ratio (3.666) and is tied for eighth in league-average adjusted ERA+ (133), fourth in strikeouts (1,085), fifth in walks and hits per inning pitched (WHIP, 1.125), fifth in strikeouts per nine innings pitched (7.240), ninth in bases on balls per 9 innings pitched (1.975) and eighth in winning percentage (.683) His .683 winning percentage also was second all-time for Cardinals starting pitchers with at least 100 starts and led the Major Leagues over the period of his Cardinals career.

On December 9, 2014, the Missouri Sports Hall of Fame announced Carpenter as an inductee in their 2015 class. The Cardinals announced on April 29, 2016, that Carpenter was voted by fans into the franchise Hall of Fame, with the enshrinement taking place on August 27, 2016.

Championships earned or shared
Title	Times	Dates	Ref
National League champion	3	2004, 2006, 2011	
World Series champion	2	2006, 2011	

Awards and honors
Title	# of times	Dates	Refs
Baseball America Minor League Baseball Top 100 Prospect	3	1995, 1996, 1997	
BBWAA St. Louis Baseball Man of the Year Award	1	2005	
BBWAA St. Louis Chapter Darryl Kile Good Guy Award	1	2006	
The Boston Globe All-Scholastic Team	1	1993	
Major League Baseball All-Star	3	2005, 2006, 2010	
MLBPA Players Choice National League Comeback Player of the Year Award	2	2004, 2009	
MLBPA Players Choice National League Outstanding Pitcher Award	2	2005, 2006	
Missouri Sports Hall of Fame inductee		2015 class	
National League Bullet Rogan Award	1	2009	
National League Comeback Player of the Year Award	1	2009	
National League Cy Young Award	1	2005	
National League Pitcher of the Month Award	1	August 2009	
National League Player of the Week Award	4	2005, 2006 (3x)	
New Hampshire All-State (baseball)	3	1991, 1992, 1993	
New Hampshire All-State (hockey)	3	1991, 1992, 1993	
New Hampshire Athlete of the Year	1	1993	
The Sporting News National League Comeback Player of the Year Award	2	2004, 2009	
The Sporting News National League Pitcher of the Year Award	2	2005, 2006	
St. Louis Cardinals Hall of Fame inductee		2016	
This Year in Baseball Starting Pitcher of the Year Award	1	2005	
Tony Conigliaro Award	1	2009	

Statistical achievements Bold: League leader
†: led both Major Leagues

- Pitched in the American League from 1997 to 2002
- Pitched in the National League from 2004 to 2012

Top ten American and National League finishes
Statistical category	# of times	Season (Rank, description)
Adjusted ERA+	3 (1)	2005, 2006, **2009**
Bases on balls per 9 innings pitched	5	2004, 2005, 2006, 2009, 2010
Batters faced	4 (1)	2001, 2005, 2010, **2011**
Complete games	6 (1)	1999, 2001, **2005^{†}**, 2006, 2009, 2011
Earned run average	3 (1)	2005, 2006, **2009**
Earned runs allowed	2 (1)	**2000**, 2011
Games started	3 (2)	2001, **2010^{†}**, **2011^{†}**
Hit by pitch	2	2001, 2010
Hits allowed	3	2001, 2010, 2011
Hits per nine innings pitched	3	2005, 2006, 2009
Home runs allowed	2	2000, 2001
Home runs per nine innings pitched	3 (1)	2005, **2009^{†}**, 2011
Innings pitched	4 (1)	2005, 2006, 2010, **2011**
Shutouts	4 (1)	2004, 2005, **2006**, 2009
Strikeouts	2	2005, 2006
Strikeouts per 9 innings pitched	2	1998, 2001
Walks plus hits per inning pitched (WHIP)	4 (1)	2004, 2005, **2006^{†}**, 2009
Wild pitches	1	1999
Winning percentage	5 (1)	2004, 2005, 2006, **2009^{†}**, 2010
Wins	5	2004, 2005, 2006, 2009, 2010

== Personal life ==
Carpenter currently resides in Bedford, New Hampshire and Clayton, Missouri. Chris filed for divorce from first wife Alyson Ickes in December 2013. He remarried in October 2015 to his present wife. His agent is Bob LaMonte. In May 2014, he put his Ladue, Missouri, home on the market for $3.65 million. Two months later, he listed his Palm Beach, Florida, home for sale for $675,000.

In the 2011–12 offseason, Carpenter and Roy Halladay were fishing in the Amazon River with fellow pitcher B. J. Ryan and professional sport fisherman Skeet Reese when they encountered a wounded man who was stranded. The man was attempting to catch fish to sell as aquarium pets when an anaconda attacked him. The snake bit him, but the victim was able to free himself. The snake attempted to wrap itself around the man, but instead wrapped itself around the motor of his 14-foot canoe, flipped it over and broke the motor off. When the pitchers discovered him, they flipped the boat back over, recovered his belongings and towed him home.

Less than three weeks after Carpenter announced his retirement, Halladay signed a one-day contract with the Blue Jays on December 9, 2013, and announced his own retirement. Carpenter's friendship with Halladay received increased media attention during the 2011 NLDS. Drafted two years apart, Halladay made his Major League debut for the Blue Jays one year after Carpenter in 1998. They met the year before while assigned with the Syracuse Chiefs and developed a competitive bond. Although they both pitched together in the Toronto rotation for four years, Carpenter had yet to achieve the success for which he is now recognized until after the Blue Jays released him following the 2002 season. That season, Halladay achieved a breakthrough with his first All-Star selection and winning 19 games with a 2.93 ERA.

== See also ==
- List of Major League Baseball annual shutout leaders
- List of World Series starting pitchers
- List of St. Louis Cardinals team records
- St. Louis Cardinals award winners and league leaders

Awards and achievements
Preceded by Roger Clemens	National League All-Star Game Starting Pitcher; 2005	Succeeded by Brad Penny
Preceded by Wandy Rodríguez	National League Pitcher of the Month; August 2009	Succeeded by Jair Jurrjens
