= Mike Sirotka =

American baseball player (born 1971)

- Pitcher
- Born: May 13, 1971 (age 53); Chicago, Illinois, U.S.
- Batted: Left Threw: Left

MLB debut
- July 19, 1995, for the Chicago White Sox

Last MLB appearance
- September 28, 2000, for the Chicago White Sox

MLB statistics
- Win–loss record: 45–42
- Earned run average: 4.31
- Strikeouts: 435
- Stats at Baseball Reference

Teams
- Chicago White Sox (1995–2000)

Michael Robert Sirotka (born May 13, 1971) is an American former professional baseball pitcher. He played for the Chicago White Sox of Major League Baseball from 1995 to 2000. He is an alumnus of Louisiana State University.

== Career ==
Drafted by the Chicago White Sox in the 15th round of the 1993 Major League Baseball Draft, Sirotka made his major league debut in 1995, pitching in 6 starts that season.

The 1996 and 1997 seasons saw Sirotka appear in only 22 games combined between both seasons.

After impressing in spring training, Sirotka opened the 1998 season in the White Sox rotation. Sirotka went on to pitch in 33 starts, pitching 5 complete games and recording a win–loss record of 14-15 in 211 2/3 innings.

In 1999, Sirotka lowered his ERA one run lower than the previous season, finishing at an even 4.00. He pitched 3 complete games to go along with a record of 11-13 in 32 starts.

The 2000 season saw Sirotka have a breakout year. He had a career high 15 wins with a career low 3.79 ERA for the White Sox, and made his first postseason appearance for the team in the 2000 American League Division Series, starting a game against the Seattle Mariners. In the offseason he traveled to Japan as part of the 2000 MLB Japan All-Star Series and pitched for the MLB squad.

On January 14, 2001, he was traded to the Toronto Blue Jays with Kevin Beirne and Brian Simmons for Matt DeWitt and David Wells in a deal that would infamously become labeled by White Sox General Manager Kenny Williams as "Shouldergate", as Sirotka would never pitch again, labeled "damaged goods" by then-Toronto GM Gord Ash. Ash believed that Williams did not turn over all information pertaining to Sirotka's shoulder. Ash later appealed the trade to MLB Commissioner Bud Selig, but Selig refused to overturn the trade.

Sirotka underwent major reconstructive shoulder surgery in April 2001 and an arthroscopic procedure in July 2002 in an attempt to get off the disabled list, but neither surgery was successful. The Blue Jays released him after the 2002 season.

In October 2002, Sirotka signed a minor league contract with the Chicago Cubs and was invited to spring training. If he made the Cubs' 25-man major league roster on Opening Day, his contract allowed him to make as much as $4 million with incentives. At the time of the signing, Sirotka attributed his "Shouldergate" injuries to pitching with a hurt elbow late in 2000 for the Sox, followed by pitching six innings in Japan that extended the damage into his shoulder.

When shoulder problems persisted during the spring, the Cubs sent Sirotka to minor-league camp on March 26, 2003.

While with the White Sox, Sirotka surrendered the sole career hit to country music superstar Garth Brooks, who at the time was participating in spring training with the San Diego Padres. Brooks' spring training hitting record was one hit in 22 at-bats.
