= Willie Adams (1990s pitcher) =

American baseball player

- Pitcher
- Born: October 8, 1972 (age 53); Gallup, New Mexico, U.S.
- Batted: Right Threw: Right

MLB debut
- June 11, 1996, for the Oakland Athletics

Last MLB appearance
- August 14, 1997, for the Oakland Athletics

MLB statistics
- Win–loss record: 6–9
- Earned run average: 5.81
- Strikeouts: 105
- Stats at Baseball Reference

Teams
- Oakland Athletics (1996–1997)

William Edward Adams (born October 8, 1972) is an American former professional baseball player whose career spanned eight seasons, including parts of two in Major League Baseball (MLB) with the Oakland Athletics (1996–1997). Over his MLB career, Adams went 6–9 with a 5.81 earned run average (ERA), one complete game, one shutout and 105 strikeouts in 25 games, 24 starts. Adams also played in the minor leagues with the Class-A Madison Muskies (1993), the Class-A Advanced Modesto A's (1994), the Double-A Huntsville Stars (1994–1995), the Triple-A Edmonton Trappers (1995–1998), the rookie-level Arizona League Athletics (1998), the Class-A Advanced Sarasota Red Sox (1999), the Double-A Trenton Thunder (1999) and the Triple-A Pawtucket Red Sox (1999–2000). In 123 minor league games, Adams went 40–34 with a 4.34 ERA, five complete games, two shutouts, six saves and 421 strikeouts.

Before turning professional, Adams attended Stanford University. He was drafted by the Athletics during his junior year at Stanford in the first round of the 1993 Major League Baseball draft. Adams also pitched two games in 1992 Summer Olympics as a member of the United States national baseball team. Adam batted and threw right-handed.

== Amateur career ==
Adams attended La Serna High School in Whittier, California. Adams was selected twice in the 1990 Major League Baseball draft, first by the Detroit Tigers in the 52^{nd} round and later by the Houston Astros in the 74^{th} round. From 1991 to 1993, he attended Stanford University. During his first season as a member of the Stanford Cardinal baseball team, Adams won the "Most Valuable Freshman" award presented by the school's athletics department. In 1992, Adams played for the United States national baseball team. He pitched two games during the 1992 Summer Olympics. Adams is the only person born in Gallup, New Mexico to compete in the Olympics. After the 1992 and 1993 seasons, Adams was the recipient of the university's "Come Through Award".

== Professional career ==
=== Oakland Athletics ===
Willie was selected by the Oakland Athletics in the first round (36^{th} pick overall) of the 1993 Major League Baseball draft. He began his professional career that season with the Class-A Madison Muskies of the Midwest League. With Madison, Willie went 0–2 with a 3.38 earned run average (ERA) and 22 strikeouts in five games, all stars. In 1994, Willie was rated as the tenth best prospect in the Athletics organization by Baseball America. During that season, Willie split the season between the Class-A Advanced Modesto A's and the Double-A Huntsville Stars. In 11 games with the A's, Willie went 7–1 with a 3.38 ERA, two saves and 42 strikeouts. He was later promoted to the Stars where he went 4–3 with a 4.30 ERA and 33 strikeouts in 10 games, all starts. In 1995, Adams was rated as the eight best prospect in the Athletics organization. During that season, Willie played for the Double-A Huntsville Stars and the Triple-A Edmonton Trappers. With the Stars, Adams went 6–5 with a 3.01 ERA and 72 strikeouts in 13 games, all starts. After receiving a promotion to the Triple-A level, Willie went 2–5 with a 4.37 ERA, one complete game, one shutout and 40 strikeouts in 11 games, 10 starts.

In 1996, Willie attended spring training with the Oakland Athletics, but was optioned to the minors on March 18, before the start of the regular season. On June 11, Willie made his major league debut against the Cleveland Indians and pitched six innings, giving-up four earned runs while earning a no-decision. On August 10, while pitching against the Cleveland Indians, Adams got his first win. During that game, Willie's father was in attendance. With the Athletics in 1996, Willie went 3–4 with a 4.01 ERA, one complete games, one shutout and 68 strikeouts in 12 games, all starts. That year, Willie also pitched in the minor leagues with the Triple-A Edmonton Trappers and went 10–4 with a 3.78 ERA, three complete games, one shutout and 80 strikeouts in 19 games, all starts. During the off-season, it was speculated by Baseball Digest that Willie would be in the Athletics' starting rotation in 1997.

Willie started the 1997 season with the Athletics. However, in mid-May, Willie was sent down to the minor leagues. Adams made his return to the majors in August for two games, but would never appear in a major league game after August 14, 1997. During his time in the minors that season, Adams went 5–4 with a 6.45 ERA and 58 strikeouts in 13 games, 12 starts. In the majors, Willie went 3–5 with an 8.18 ERA and 37 strikeouts in 13 games, 12 starts. In 1998, Willie continued playing in the Athletics minor league organization. He split the season between the rookie-level Arizona League Athletics and the Triple-A Edmonton Trappers. Adams pitched just four combined games that season, going 0–1 with a 7.36 ERA and four strikeouts.

=== Boston Red Sox ===
In 1999, Willie joined the Boston Red Sox organization. He started the regular season with the Class-A Advanced Sarasota Red Sox. With Sarasota, Willie went 1–1 with a 1.98 ERA and six strikeouts in two games, both starts. He was then promoted to the Double-A Trenton Thunder where he went 1–1 with a 4.63 ERA and six strikeouts in two games, both starts. Willie received his final promotion to the Triple-A Pawtucket Red Sox. At Pawtucket, Willie went 4–5 with a 5.15 ERA, one complete game, one shutout and 37 strikeouts in 11 games, all starts. Willie suffered injuries throughout the season. On the season, combined between the three teams, Adam's record was 6–7 with a 4.60 ERA in 15 games, all starts. During his final professional season, 2000, Willie played for the Triple-A Pawtucket Red Sox. He suffered right shoulder inflammation early in the season and was placed on the disabled list on May 22. Pitcher Hipólito Pichardo replaced Willie on the Pawtucket roster. Willie finished the season with a record of 0–2 with a 5.47 ERA, four saves and 21 strikeouts in 20 relief appearances.
