= Chris Michalak =

American baseball player (born 1971)

- Pitcher
- Born: January 4, 1971 (age 55); Joliet, Illinois, U.S.
- Batted: Left Threw: Left

MLB debut
- August 22, 1998, for the Arizona Diamondbacks

Last MLB appearance
- September 27, 2006, for the Cincinnati Reds

MLB statistics
- Win–loss record: 10–15
- Earned run average: 4.70
- Strikeouts: 87
- Stats at Baseball Reference

Teams
- Arizona Diamondbacks (1998); Toronto Blue Jays (2001); Texas Rangers (2001–2002); Cincinnati Reds (2006)

Christian Matthew Michalak (born January 4, 1971) is an American former professional baseball left-handed pitcher. He played in Major League Baseball (MLB) for the Arizona Diamondbacks, Toronto Blue Jays, Texas Rangers, and Cincinnati Reds between 1998 and 2006.

== Amateur career ==
A native of Joliet, Illinois, Michalak attended Joliet Catholic Academy and the University of Notre Dame. In 1991, he played collegiate summer baseball with the Chatham A's of the Cape Cod Baseball League.

== Professional career ==
Michalak was selected by the Oakland Athletics in the 12th round of the 1993 MLB draft. He signed as a free agent with the Arizona Diamondbacks in 1997, and made his major league debut with Arizona in 1998. His most productive season came in 2001, when he pitched 136.2 innings while splitting time for the Toronto Blue Jays and Texas Rangers. His final major league appearance came in 2006 for the Cincinnati Reds.

Michalak played for the Washington Nationals Triple-A affiliate, the Columbus Clippers, in 2007. On June 14, 2008, Michalak signed a minor league contract with the Florida Marlins and was assigned to their Triple-A affiliate, the Albuquerque Isotopes. After his release from the Marlins organization, he signed with the Oakland Athletics and assigned to their Double-A affiliate, the Midland RockHounds, on August 2, 2008. He became a free agent at the end of the season. On April 26, 2009, Michalak signed a minor league deal with the Toronto Blue Jays.

== Coaching career ==
On December 4, 2009, Michalak was named the pitching coach for the Hagerstown Suns. This was the beginning of a career that brought him to the Albuquerque Isotopes, the Triple-A affiliate of the Colorado Rockies, from 2021 to 2022. As of 2026, Michalak is interim manager of the independent Cleburne Railroaders.
