= Daron Kirkreit =

American former pitcher (born 1972)

- Pitcher
- Born: August 7, 1972 (age 53); Anaheim, California, U.S.
- Bats: Right Throws: Right

Daron Jon Kirkreit (born August 7, 1972) is an American former baseball pitcher who played internationally for the United States national baseball team in the 1992 Summer Olympics, and played professionally in the minor leagues from 1993 to 2001.

== Biography ==
A native of Anaheim, California, Kirkreit played college baseball for the University of California, Riverside. Originally cut from Team USA in 1992, he was playing collegiate summer baseball for the Cotuit Kettleers of the Cape Cod Baseball League when he was recalled to the Olympic team.

Kirkreit was drafted in the first round, the 11th pick, of the 1993 Major League Baseball (MLB) Draft by the Cleveland Indians. He played in the Indians, Milwaukee Brewers, Kansas City Royals, Seattle Mariners, and the Anaheim Angels minor league systems until his retirement after the 2001 season.
