= Bob File =

American baseball player (born 1977)

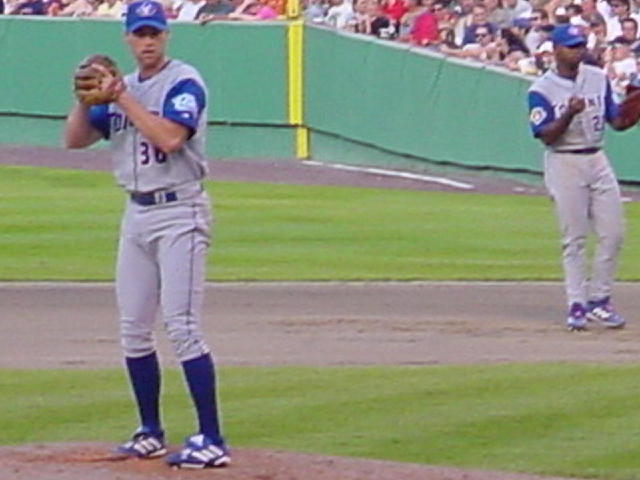
- Bob File - Fenway Park, June 2001
- Pitcher
- Born: January 28, 1977 (age 49); Philadelphia, Pennsylvania, U.S.
- Batted: Right Threw: Right

MLB debut
- April 14, 2001, for the Toronto Blue Jays

Last MLB appearance
- September 30, 2004, for the Toronto Blue Jays

MLB statistics
- Win–loss record: 6–4
- Earned run average: 4.20
- Strikeouts: 55
- Stats at Baseball Reference

Teams
- Toronto Blue Jays (2001–2004)

Robert Michael File (born January 28, 1977) is an American former professional baseball pitcher. File spent three-plus seasons as a reliever for the Toronto Blue Jays of Major League Baseball (MLB) from 2001 to 2004. He signed with the St. Louis Cardinals in 2005, retiring shortly after spring training with a back injury.

File was drafted as a third baseman out of NCAA Division II, then converted to pitcher while in the Jays' farm system.

File is a former pitching coach at La Salle University in Philadelphia. La Salle University competes at the NCAA Division I level in the Atlantic 10 baseball conference.

== Pitching style and biography ==
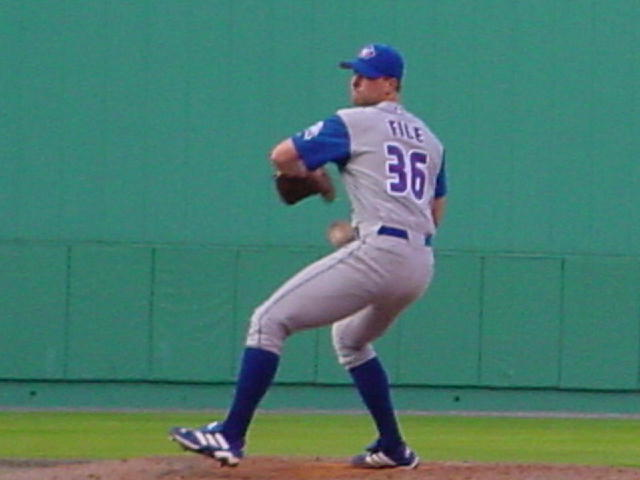
File delivers a pitch versus the Boston Red Sox in 2001

File threw a 96 mph (154 km/h) four-seam fastball, a 91–94 mph (146–151 km/h) sinker, a 77–82 mph (124–132 km/h) slider, and an 82–84 mph (132–135 km/h) sweeper.

File is one of seven pitchers in major-league history to win a game in his first appearance while throwing five pitches or fewer.

File was a standout infielder at Father Judge High School in Philadelphia before becoming a pitcher for the Toronto Blue Jays.

File was one of the top players in the history of Philadelphia University's (now Thomas Jefferson University) baseball program.

- Earned ABCA/Rawlings first-team All-American honors as a senior in 1998.
- Earned ECAC (East Coast Athletic Conference) Player of the Year honors as a senior in 1998.
- Three-time NYCAC (New York Collegiate Athletic Conference) All-Conference selection, earning Player of the Year honors in 1998.
- Set several school hitting records as a senior in 1998, including a .542 batting average.
- .542 batting average in 1998 was No. 1 in the country, leading all NCAA baseball.
- Also set single-season records with 90 hits, 63 runs, 68 RBI, 19 home runs, and 167 total bases in 1998.
- Is the university's all-time leader in nearly every career hitting category including runs (181), hits (296), triples (17) and home runs (37).
