= Brad Fullmer =

American baseball player (born 1975)

- First baseman / Designated hitter
- Born: January 17, 1975 (age 51); Chatsworth, California, U.S.
- Batted: Left Threw: Right

MLB debut
- September 2, 1997, for the Montreal Expos

Last MLB appearance
- July 24, 2004, for the Texas Rangers

MLB statistics
- Batting average: .279
- Home runs: 114
- Runs batted in: 442
- Stats at Baseball Reference

Teams
- Montreal Expos (1997–1999); Toronto Blue Jays (2000–2001); Anaheim Angels (2002–2003); Texas Rangers (2004)

Career highlights and awards
- World Series champion (2002)

Bradley Ryan Fullmer (born January 17, 1975) is an American former Major League Baseball (MLB) first baseman and designated hitter. In an eight-year career, he played for the Montreal Expos (1997–1999), Toronto Blue Jays (2000–2001), Anaheim Angels (2002–2003), and the Texas Rangers (2004).

== Career ==
Fullmer played baseball at Montclair College Preparatory School in Van Nuys, California where he hit .568 with 15 home runs as a senior. Fullmer committed to play college baseball at Stanford but was lured away from his commitment after the Montreal Expos selected him in the second round of the 1993 Major League Baseball draft and offered him a package worth $520,000. Fullmer went to high school with another future Major League player, Russ Ortiz, whom he played against in the 2002 World Series.

He hit a home run in his first major league at bat on September 2, 1997. Fullmer's best season came in 2000, while playing for the Toronto Blue Jays. In 133 games, he hit career bests in home runs (32), RBIs (104), and batting average (.295). Fullmer was a member of the World Series champion Anaheim Angels in 2002.

Fullmer's final game at the major league level was during the 2004 season with the Texas Rangers. He spent nearly all of 2005 out of baseball healing from injuries, before joining the Charlotte Knights near season's end, though he never played for them and would eventually retire.

In 807 games over eight seasons, Fullmer posted a .279 batting average (778-for-2789) with 395 runs, 203 doubles, 16 triples, 114 home runs, 442 RBI, 32 stolen bases, 216 bases on balls, .336 on-base percentage and .486 slugging percentage. He finished his career with a .988 fielding percentage. In 12 postseason games, he hit .294 (10-for-34) with 6 runs, 3 doubles, 1 home run, 5 RBI, 2 stolen bases and 3 walks.

== See also ==
- List of players with a home run in first major league at-bat
