= 1993 Major League Baseball draft =

Baseball draft of amateur players

General information
- Date: 1993

Overview
- 1,721 total selections
- First selection: Alex Rodriguez; Seattle Mariners
- First round selections: 42
- Hall of Famers: 2: P Billy Wagner; 3B Scott Rolen

The 1993 Major League Baseball draft began with first round selections on June 3, 1993. Alex Rodriguez was selected first overall by the Seattle Mariners. Other notable draftees included future Baseball Hall of Fame inductees Scott Rolen and Billy Wagner. Future All-Stars Chris Carpenter, Torii Hunter, and Jason Varitek were also selected, along with future NFL Hall of Famer Marshall Faulk and Heisman Trophy winner Charlie Ward.

== First round selections ==
All-Star
Member of the Baseball Hall of Fame

Pick	Player	Team	Position	School
1	Alex Rodriguez	Seattle Mariners	Shortstop	Westminster Christian School (FL)
2	Darren Dreifort	Los Angeles Dodgers	Pitcher	Wichita State
3	Brian Anderson	California Angels	Pitcher	Wright State
4	Wayne Gomes	Philadelphia Phillies	Pitcher	Old Dominion
5	Jeff Granger	Kansas City Royals	Pitcher	Texas A&M
6	Steve Soderstrom	San Francisco Giants	Pitcher	Fresno State
7	Trot Nixon	Boston Red Sox	Outfield	New Hanover High School (NC)
8	Kirk Presley	New York Mets	Pitcher	Tupelo High School (MS)
9	Matt Brunson	Detroit Tigers	Shortstop	Cherry Creek High School (CO)
10	Brooks Kieschnick	Chicago Cubs	Outfield	Texas
11	Daron Kirkreit	Cleveland Indians	Pitcher	UC Riverside
12	Billy Wagner	Houston Astros	Pitcher	Ferrum College
13	Matt Drews	New York Yankees	Pitcher	Sarasota High School (FL)
14	Derrek Lee	San Diego Padres	First Base	El Camino High School (CA)
15	Chris Carpenter	Toronto Blue Jays (Note: Compensation pick from Texas Rangers for signing free agent Tom Henke)	Pitcher	Trinity High School (NH)
16	Alan Benes	St. Louis Cardinals	Pitcher	Creighton
17	Scott Christman	Chicago White Sox	Pitcher	Oregon State
18	Chris Schwab	Montreal Expos	Outfield	Cretin-Derham Hall High School (MN)
19	Jay Powell	Baltimore Orioles	Pitcher	Mississippi State
20	Torii Hunter	Minnesota Twins (Note: Compensation pick from Cincinnati Reds for signing of free agent John Smiley)	Outfield	Pine Bluff High School (AR)
21	Jason Varitek	Minnesota Twins	Catcher	Georgia Tech
22	Charles Peterson	Pittsburgh Pirates	Outfield	Laurens District High School
23	Jeff D'Amico	Milwaukee Brewers	Pitcher	Northeast High School
24	Jon Ratliff	Chicago Cubs (Note: Compensation pick from Atlanta Braves for signing of free agent Greg Maddux)	Pitcher	LeMoyne College
25	John Wasdin	Oakland Athletics	Pitcher	Florida State
26	Kelly Wunsch	Milwaukee Brewers (Note: Compensation pick from Toronto Blue Jays for signing of free agent Paul Molitor)	Pitcher	Texas A&M
27	Marc Valdes	Florida Marlins	Pitcher	Florida
28	Jamey Wright	Colorado Rockies	Pitcher	Westmoore High School

== Compensation picks ==
Pick	Player	Team	Position	School
29	Kevin Orie	Chicago Cubs (Note: Supplemental pick for loss of free agent Greg Maddux)	Shortstop	Indiana University
30	Mike Bell	Texas Rangers (Note: Supplemental pick for loss of free agent Jose Guzman)	Third Base	Moeller High School
31	Josue Estrada	Montreal Expos (Note: Supplemental pick for loss of free agent Spike Owen)	Outfield	Medardo Carazo High School
32	Pat Watkins	Cincinnati Reds (Note: Supplemental pick for loss of free agent Greg Swindell)	Outfield	East Carolina University
33	Marc Barcelo	Minnesota Twins (Note: Supplemental pick for loss of free agent John Smiley)	Pitcher	Arizona State University
34	Jermaine Allensworth	Pittsburgh Pirates (Note: Supplemental pick for loss of free agent Doug Drabek)	Outfield	Purdue University
35	Todd Dunn	Milwaukee Brewers (Note: Supplemental pick for loss of free agent Chris Bosio)	Outfield	University of North Florida
36	Willie Adams	Oakland Athletics (Note: Supplemental pick for loss of free agent Dave Stewart)	Pitcher	Stanford University
37	Matt Farner	Toronto Blue Jays (Note: Supplemental pick for loss of free agent David Cone)	Outfield	East Pennsboro High School
38	Kelcey Mucker	Minnesota Twins (Note: Supplemental pick for loss of free agent Greg Gagne)	Outfield	Lawrenceburg High School
39	Joe Wagner	Milwaukee Brewers (Note: Supplemental pick for loss of free agent Paul Molitor)	Pitcher	University of Central Florida
40	Jeremy Lee	Toronto Blue Jays (Note: Supplemental pick for loss of free agent Tom Henke)	Pitcher	Galesburg High School
41	Mark Lukasiewicz	Toronto Blue Jays (Note: Supplemental pick for loss of free agent Jimmy Key)	Pitcher	Brevard Community College
42	Charles Rice	Pittsburgh Pirates (Note: Supplemental pick for loss of free agent Barry Bonds)	First Base	Parker High School

== Other notable players ==
- Scott Rolen, 2nd round, 46th overall by the Philadelphia Phillies
- Chris Singleton, 2nd round, 48th overall by the San Francisco Giants
- Jeff Suppan, 2nd round, 49th overall by the Boston Red Sox
- Jay Witasick, 2nd round, 58th overall by the St. Louis Cardinals
- Greg Norton, 2nd round, 59th overall by the Chicago White Sox
- Brad Fullmer, 2nd round, 60th overall by the Montreal Expos
- Scott Sullivan, 2nd round, 62nd overall by the Cincinnati Reds
- Matt Clement, 3rd round, 86th overall by the San Diego Padres
- Eli Marrero, 3rd round, 88th overall by the St. Louis Cardinals
- Billy Koch, 4th round, 108th overall by the New York Mets, but did not sign
- Paul Bako, 5th round, 148th overall by the Cincinnati Reds
- Brian Moehler, 6th round, 165th overall by the Detroit Tigers
- Scott Spiezio, 6th round, 181st overall by the Oakland Athletics
- Mark Loretta, 7th round, 207th overall by the Milwaukee Brewers
- John Thomson, 7th round, 212th overall by the Colorado Rockies
- Steve Kline, 8th round, 223rd overall by the Cleveland Indians
- R. A. Dickey, 10th round, 277th overall by the Detroit Tigers, but did not sign
- Kevin Millwood, 11th round, 320th overall by the Atlanta Braves
- Alex Cora, 12th round, 345th overall by the Minnesota Twins, but did not sign
- Gary Matthews, Jr., 13th round, 366th overall by the San Diego Padres
- Keith Foulke 14th round, 389th overall by the Detroit Tigers, but did not sign
- José Molina 14th round, 390th overall by the Chicago Cubs
- Bill Mueller, 15th round, 414th overall by the San Francisco Giants
- Rodney Mazion, 15th round, 416th overall by the New York Mets
- Mike Sirotka, 15th round, 425th overall by the Chicago White Sox
- Tim Cossins, 16th round, 451st overall by the Texas Rangers
- Glendon Rusch, 17th round, 469th overall by the Kansas City Royals
- Dan Kolb, 17th round, 485th overall by the Minnesota Twins, but did not sign
- Jermaine Dye, 17th round, 488th overall by the Atlanta Braves
- John Rocker, 18th round, 516th overall by the Atlanta Braves
- Mark Hendrickson, 21st round, 590th overall by the San Diego Padres, but did not sign
- Richie Sexson, 24th round, 671st overall by the Cleveland Indians
- Paul Lo Duca, 25th round, 690th overall by the Los Angeles Dodgers
- Doug Davis, 31st round, 858th overall by the Los Angeles Dodgers, but did not sign
- Jacque Jones, 31st round, 861st overall by the Kansas City Royals, but did not sign
- Dave Berg, 38th round, 1079th overall by the Florida Marlins
- Bob Howry, 45th round, 1269th overall by the Florida Marlins, but did not sign
- Dave Roberts, 47th round, 1303rd overall by the Cleveland Indians, but did not sign
- Plácido Polanco, 49th round, 1357th overall by the Chicago White Sox, but did not sign
- Mike Lincoln, 51st round, 1400th overall by the Montreal Expos, but did not sign

=== CFL/NBA/NFL players drafted ===
- Akili Smith, 7th round, 206th overall by the Pittsburgh Pirates
- Billy Joe Hobert, 16th round, 453rd overall by the Chicago White Sox, but did not sign
- Corey Dillon, 34th round, 954th overall by the San Diego Padres, but did not sign
- Marshall Faulk, 43rd round, 1195th overall by the California Angels, but did not sign
- Daryl Porter, 56th round, 1493rd overall by the California Angels, but did not sign
- Charlie Ward, 59th round, 1556th overall by the Milwaukee Brewers, but did not sign
- Shawn Knight, 75th round, 1671st overall by the Chicago Cubs, but did not sign

Preceded by Phil Nevin	1st Overall Picks; Alex Rodriguez	Succeeded by Paul Wilson
