= Paul Quantrill =

Canadian baseball player (born 1968)

- Pitcher
- Born: November 3, 1968 (age 57); London, Ontario, Canada
- Batted: Left Threw: Right

MLB debut
- July 20, 1992, for the Boston Red Sox

Last MLB appearance
- September 27, 2005, for the Florida Marlins

MLB statistics
- Win–loss record: 68–78
- Earned run average: 3.83
- Strikeouts: 725
- Stats at Baseball Reference

Teams
- Boston Red Sox (1992–1994); Philadelphia Phillies (1994–1995); Toronto Blue Jays (1996–2001); Los Angeles Dodgers (2002–2003); New York Yankees (2004–2005); San Diego Padres (2005); Florida Marlins (2005)

Career highlights and awards
- All-Star (2001)

Member of the Canadian

Baseball Hall of Fame
- Induction: 2010

Paul John Quantrill (born November 3, 1968) is a Canadian former professional baseball right-handed relief pitcher. He played in Major League Baseball (MLB) for 14 seasons, from 1992 to 2005; his longest tenure was six seasons with the Toronto Blue Jays. Quantrill appeared in 80 or more games during a season five times, led his league in pitching appearances for four consecutive seasons, and did not walk more than 25 batters in a season from 1996 onwards.

== Career ==
Quantrill was drafted in the 1986 MLB draft by the Los Angeles Dodgers in the 26th round, 660th overall, but did not sign. After three years at the University of Wisconsin, he was selected by the Boston Red Sox in the sixth round of the 1989 MLB draft, 161st overall; three years later he made his major league debut, on July 20, 1992.

Originally considered a starting pitcher, Quantrill split time between the starting rotation and the bullpen over the course of several years, eventually finding consistency as a reliever. Some of his best years came for the Toronto Blue Jays, a team located in his home province of Ontario. Quantrill earned a reputation for being very durable and having impeccable control; commentators often said that he had a "rubber arm", a term used in baseball to describe pitchers who can be heavily used and relied upon while remaining healthy and effective.

Before the 2004 season, Quantrill signed a two-year, $6.8-million deal with the New York Yankees. Quantrill pitched effectively for the Yankees as a set-up man for most of the season, leading Yankees announcer Michael Kay to create the nickname "Quan-Go-Mo" for the "three-headed monster" that made up the Yankees usual bullpen progression of Quantrill, Tom Gordon and Mariano Rivera (known as "Mo").

Due to poor performance the following year, Quantrill was designated for assignment on July 1, 2005. The next day he was traded to the San Diego Padres for pitchers Tim Redding and Darrell May. Quantrill was then traded to the Florida Marlins and spent the rest of the year in the bullpen. While playing in the 2006 World Baseball Classic, Quantrill announced that he would retire at the end of the event.

Quantrill served as a coach for Team Canada during the World Baseball Classics in 2009, 2013, and 2017.

On June 19, 2010, Quantrill was inducted, along with former Blue Jay Roberto Alomar, into the Canadian Baseball Hall of Fame in St. Marys, Ontario.

== Accomplishments ==
- All-Star (2001)
- 4× led his league in appearances (2001 AL, 2002 NL, 2003 NL, 2004 AL)
- Career 3.83 earned run average (ERA)
- Holds New York Yankees record for most games pitched in a season (86 in 2004)

== Personal life ==
Since retirement, Quantrill has lived in Port Hope, Ontario.

Quantrill has a son and two daughters. His son, Cal, is a pitcher in Major League Baseball.

Quantrill has also served as pitching coach for Team Canada at the World Baseball Classic in 2009, 2013, 2017, 2023, and 2026.

== See also ==
- List of Major League Baseball players from Canada
