= Matt DeWitt =

American baseball player (born 1977)

- Pitcher
- Born: September 4, 1977 (age 47); San Bernardino, California, U.S.
- Batted: Right Threw: Right

MLB debut
- June 20, 2000, for the Toronto Blue Jays

Last MLB appearance
- May 2, 2002, for the San Diego Padres

MLB statistics
- Win–loss record: 1–3
- Earned run average: 4.95
- Strikeouts: 24
- Stats at Baseball Reference

Teams
- Toronto Blue Jays (2000–2001); San Diego Padres (2002)

Matthew Brian DeWitt (born September 4, 1977) is an American former Major League Baseball pitcher who briefly played in 29 games with the Toronto Blue Jays (2000–2001) and the San Diego Padres (2002). He also pitched in the minor leagues for the Baltimore Orioles, Milwaukee Brewers and St. Louis Cardinals organizations.
