= Brian Simmons (baseball) =

American baseball player (born 1973)

- Outfielder & Pinch Hitter
- Born: September 4, 1973 (age 53); Mt. Lebanon, Pennsylvania, U.S.
- Batted: Both Threw: Right

MLB debut
- September 21, 1998, for the Chicago White Sox

Last MLB appearance
- October 7, 2001, for the Toronto Blue Jays

MLB statistics
- Batting average: .218
- Home runs: 8
- Runs batted in: 31
- Stats at Baseball Reference

Teams
- Chicago White Sox (1998–1999); Toronto Blue Jays (2001)

Brian Lee Simmons (born September 4, 1973) is an American former Major League Baseball (MLB) outfielder. He played for the Chicago White Sox and Toronto Blue Jays over parts of three seasons.

== Career ==
Simmons attended the University of Michigan, and in 1994 he played collegiate summer baseball with the Cotuit Kettleers of the Cape Cod Baseball League. He was selected by the Chicago White Sox in the 2nd round of the 1995 MLB draft. Simmons would make his Major League Baseball debut with the Chicago White Sox on September 21, 1998, and appeared in his final game on October 7, 2001. On September 26, 1998 against the Royals, Simmons hit home runs from both sides of the plate, establishing a new record for fewest at-bats required to do so. His fledgling career was derailed, however, when he ruptured his Achilles tendon late in 2000 spring training.
