= 1995 Cincinnati Reds season =

1995 Cincinnati Reds
- National League Central champions
- League: National League
- Division: Central
- Ballpark: Riverfront Stadium
- City: Cincinnati
- Record: 85–59 (.590)
- Divisional place: 1st
- Owners: Marge Schott
- General managers: Jim Bowden
- Managers: Davey Johnson
- Television: WLWT; SportsChannel Cincinnati (Marty Brennaman, George Grande, Chris Welsh)
- Radio: WLW (Marty Brennaman, Joe Nuxhall)

The 1995 Cincinnati Reds season was the 126th season for the franchise in Major League Baseball, and their 26th and 25th full season at Riverfront Stadium. The team won their first-ever National League Central title, and the NLDS in three straight games over the Los Angeles Dodgers before losing the NLCS in four games to the eventual World Series champion Atlanta Braves. It was both the last season for manager Davey Johnson and the last (as of 2026) playoff series victory for the Reds. It was also their last playoff appearance until the 2010 season.

As of the end of the 2026 regular season, it remains the most recent season in which the Reds won a postseason series.

== Offseason ==
- October 13, 1994: Jacob Brumfield was traded by the Reds to the Pittsburgh Pirates for Danny Clyburn.
- November 3, 1994: Joe Oliver was released by the Reds.
- November 4, 1994: Damon Berryhill was signed as a free agent by the Reds.
- December 1, 1994: Kevin Maas was released by the Reds.
- December 22, 1994: Jack Morris was signed as a free agent by the Reds.

== Regular season ==
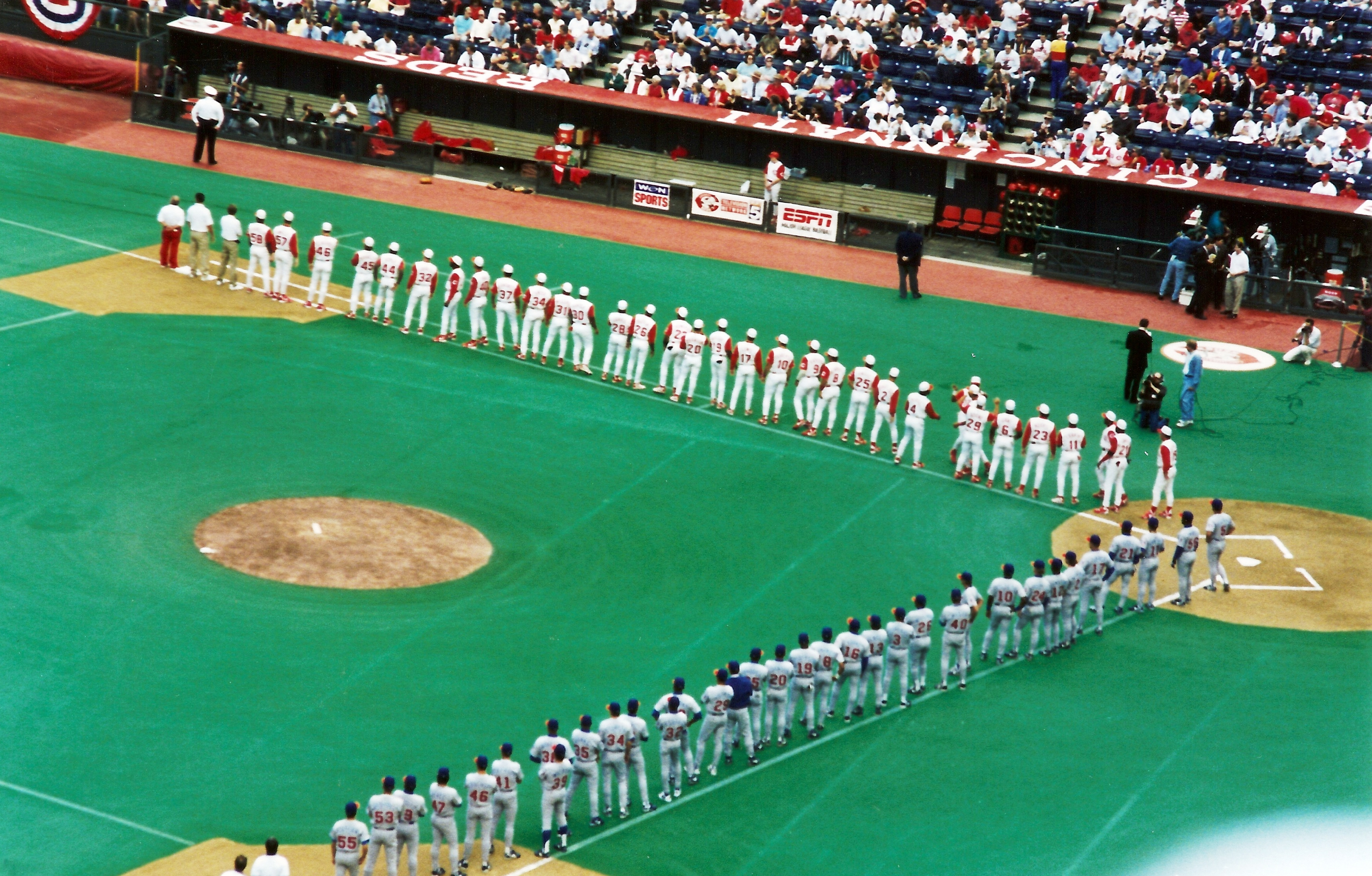
Cincinnati Reds Opening Day 1995 at Riverfront Stadium

=== Season standings ===
NL Central
Team	W	L	Pct.	GB	Home	Road
Cincinnati Reds	85	59	.590	—	44‍–‍28	41‍–‍31
Houston Astros	76	68	.528	9	36‍–‍36	40‍–‍32
Chicago Cubs	73	71	.507	12	34‍–‍38	39‍–‍33
St. Louis Cardinals	62	81	.434	22½	39‍–‍33	23‍–‍48
Pittsburgh Pirates	58	86	.403	27	31‍–‍41	27‍–‍45

=== Record vs. opponents ===
1995 National League record Source: MLB Standings Grid – 1995
Team	ATL	CHC	CIN	COL	FLA	HOU	LAD	MON	NYM	PHI	PIT	SD	SF	STL
Atlanta	—	8–4	8–5	9–4	10–3	6–6	5–4	9–4	5–8	7–6	4–2	5–2	7–1	7–5
Chicago	4–8	—	3–7	6–7	8–4	5–8	7–5	3–5	4–3	6–1	8–5	5–7	5–7	9–4
Cincinnati	5–8	7–3	—	5–7	6–6	12–1	4–3	8–4	7–5	9–3	8–5	3–6	3–3	8–5
Colorado	4–9	7–6	7–5	—	5–7	4–4	4–9	7–1	5–4	4–2	8–4	9–4	8–5	5–7
Florida	3–10	4–8	6–6	7–5	—	8–4	3–7	6–7	7–6	6–7	5–8	3–2	5–3	4–3
Houston	6–6	8–5	1–12	4–4	4–8	—	3–2	9–3	6–6	5–7	9–4	7–4	5–3	9–4
Los Angeles	4–5	5–7	3–4	9–4	7–3	2–3	—	7–5	6–6	4–9	9–4	7–6	8–5	7–5
Montreal	4–9	5–3	4–8	1–7	7–6	3–9	5–7	—	7–6	8–5	4–4	7–5	7–6	4–3
New York	8–5	3–4	5–7	4–5	6–7	6–6	6–6	6–7	—	7–6	4–3	6–7	5–8	3–4
Philadelphia	6–7	1–6	3–9	2–4	7–6	7–5	9–4	5–8	6–7	—	6–3	6–6	6–6	5–4
Pittsburgh	2–4	5–8	5–8	4–8	8–5	4–9	4–9	4–4	3–4	3–6	—	4–8	6–6	6–7
San Diego	2–5	7–5	6–3	4–9	2–3	4–7	6–7	5–7	7–6	6–6	8–4	—	6–7	7–5
San Francisco	1–7	7–5	3–3	5–8	3–5	3–5	5–8	6–7	8–5	6–6	6–6	7–6	—	7–6
St. Louis	5–7	4–9	5–8	7–5	3–4	4-9	5–7	3–4	4–3	4–5	7–6	5–7	6–7	—

=== Notable transactions ===
- April 5, 1995: Eric Anthony was signed as a free agent by the Reds.
- May 3, 1995: Tim Belcher was signed as a free agent by the Reds.
- May 15, 1995: Tim Belcher was traded by the Reds to the Seattle Mariners for Roger Salkeld.
- June 12, 1995: Jarvis Brown was signed as a free agent by the Reds.
- June 14, 1995: Jarvis Brown was sent by the Reds to the Baltimore Orioles as part of a conditional deal.
- July 21, 1995: Ricky Pickett, John Roper, Deion Sanders, Scott Service, and David McCarty were traded by the Reds to the San Francisco Giants for Mark Portugal, Dave Burba and Darren Lewis.
- July 25, 1995: Frank Viola signed as a free agent with the Cincinnati Reds.
- August 8, 1995: Mariano Duncan was selected off waivers by the Reds from the Philadelphia Phillies.

=== Roster ===
1995 Cincinnati Reds
Roster
Pitchers: 45 Jeff Brantley; 34 Dave Burba; 58 Héctor Carrasco; 62 John Courtright; 65 Matt Grott; 37 Xavier Hernandez; 42 Mike Jackson; 32,42 Kevin Jarvis; 31 Chuck McElroy; 49 C. J. Nitkowski; 41 Brad Pennington; 21 Mark Portugal; 40 Tim Pugh; 48 Rick Reed; 38 Mike Remlinger; 27 José Rijo; 44 John Roper; 47 Johnny Ruffin; 46 Pete Schourek; 57 John Smiley; 34 Pete Smith; 47 Scott Sullivan; 44 Frank Viola; 49 David Wells	Catchers: 8 Damon Berryhill; 18 Benito Santiago; 10 Eddie Taubensee; Infielders: 29 Bret Boone; 20 Jeff Branson; 77 Mariano Duncan; 12 Willie Greene; 28 Lenny Harris; 30 Brian Hunter; 11 Barry Larkin; 17 Mark Lewis; 23 Hal Morris; 51 Eric Owens; 39 Craig Worthington	Outfielders: 9 Eric Anthony; 6 Ron Gant; 61 Steve Gibralter; 22 Thomas Howard; 7 Darren Lewis; 21 Deion Sanders; 16 Reggie Sanders; 19 Jerome Walton; 49 Nigel Wilson	Manager: 15 Davey Johnson; Assistant manager/bench coach: 25 Ray Knight; Coaches: 35 Don Gullett (pitching); 3 Grant Jackson (bullpen); 4 Hal McRae (third base/hitting); 2 Joel Youngblood (first base)

== Player stats ==
=== Batting ===
==== Starters by position ====
Note: Pos = Position; G = Games played; AB = At bats; H = Hits; Avg. = Batting average; HR = Home runs; RBI = Runs batted in

Pos	Player	G	AB	H	Avg.	HR	RBI
C	Benito Santiago	81	266	76	.286	11	44
1B	Hal Morris	101	359	100	.279	11	51
2B	Bret Boone	138	513	137	.267	15	68
3B	Jeff Branson	122	331	86	.260	12	45
SS	Barry Larkin	131	496	158	.319	15	66
LF	Ron Gant	119	410	113	.276	29	88
CF	Darren Lewis	58	163	40	.245	0	8
RF	Reggie Sanders	133	484	148	.306	28	99

==== Other batters ====
Note: G = Games played; AB = At bats; H = Hits; Avg. = Batting average; HR = Home runs; RBI = Runs batted in

Player	G	AB	H	Avg.	HR	RBI
Thomas Howard	113	281	85	.302	3	26
Eddie Taubensee	80	218	62	.284	9	44
Lenny Harris	101	197	41	.208	2	16
Mark Lewis	81	171	58	.339	3	30
Jerome Walton	102	162	47	.290	8	22
Eric Anthony	47	134	36	.269	5	23
Deion Sanders	33	129	31	.240	1	10
Damon Berryhill	34	82	15	.183	2	11
Brian Hunter	40	79	17	.215	1	9
Mariano Duncan	29	69	20	.290	3	13
Willie Greene	8	19	2	.105	0	0
Craig Worthington	10	18	5	.278	1	2
Nigel Wilson	5	7	0	.000	0	0
Steve Gibralter	4	3	1	.333	0	0
Eric Owens	2	2	2	1.000	0	1

=== Pitching ===
==== Starting pitchers ====
Note: G = Games pitched; IP = Innings pitched; W = Wins; L = Losses; ERA = Earned run average; SO = Strikeouts

Player	G	IP	W	L	ERA	SO
Pete Schourek	29	190.1	18	7	3.22	160
John Smiley	28	176.2	12	5	3.46	124
Kevin Jarvis	19	79.0	3	4	5.70	33
Mark Portugal	14	77.2	6	5	3.82	33
David Wells	11	72.2	6	5	3.59	50
José Rijo	14	69.0	5	4	4.17	62
C. J. Nitkowski	9	32.1	1	3	6.12	18
Rick Reed	4	17.0	0	0	5.82	10
Frank Viola	3	14.1	0	1	6.28	4
John Roper	2	7.0	0	0	10.29	6

==== Other pitchers ====
Note: G = Games pitched; IP = Innings pitched; W = Wins; L = Losses; ERA = Earned run average; SO = Strikeouts

Player	G	IP	W	L	ERA	SO
Tim Pugh	28	98.1	6	5	3.84	38
Dave Burba	15	63.1	6	2	3.27	50
Pete Smith	11	24.1	1	2	6.66	14

==== Relief pitchers ====
Note: G = Games pitched; W = Wins; L = Losses; SV = Saves; ERA = Earned run average; SO = Strikeouts

Player	G	W	L	SV	ERA	SO
Jeff Brantley	56	3	2	28	2.82	62
Héctor Carrasco	64	2	7	5	4.12	64
Xavier Hernandez	59	7	2	3	4.60	84
Chuck McElroy	44	3	4	0	6.02	27
Mike Jackson	40	6	1	2	2.39	41
Johnny Ruffin	10	0	0	0	1.35	11
Brad Pennington	6	0	0	0	5.59	7
Scott Sullivan	3	0	0	0	4.91	2
Matt Grott	2	0	0	0	21.60	2
Mike Remlinger	2	0	0	0	9.00	1
John Courtright	1	0	0	0	9.00	0

== Postseason ==
=== Game log ===
1995 Postseason Game Log (3–4)
NLDS vs Dodgers (3–0)

#	Date	Opponent	Score	Win	Loss	Save	Location	Attendance	Record
1	October 3	@ Dodgers	7–2	Harnisch (1–0)	Martinez (0–1)	—	Dodger Stadium	44,199	1–0
2	October 4	@ Dodgers	5–4	Burba (1–0)	Osuna (0–1)	Brantley (1)	Dodger Stadium	46,051	2–0
3	October 6	Dodgers	10–1	Wells (1–0)	Nomo (0–1)	—	Riverfront Stadium	53,276	3–0

NLCS vs Braves (0–4)

#	Date	Opponent	Score	Win	Loss	Save	Location	Attendance	Record
1	October 10	Braves	1–2 (11)	Wohlers (1–0)	Jackson (0–1)	McMichael (1)	Riverfront Stadium	40,382	0–1
2	October 11	Braves	2–6 (10)	McMichael (1–0)	Portugal (0–1)	—	Riverfront Stadium	44,624	0–2
3	October 13	@ Braves	2–5	Maddux (1–0)	Wells (0–1)	—	Atlanta–Fulton County Stadium	51,424	0–3
4	October 14	@ Braves	0–6	Avery (1–0)	Schourek (0–1)	—	Atlanta–Fulton County Stadium	52,067	0–4

== Farm system ==
Level	Team	League	Manager
AAA	Indianapolis Indians	American Association	Marc Bombard
AA	Chattanooga Lookouts	Southern League	Dave Miley
A	Winston-Salem Warthogs	Carolina League	Mark Berry
A	Charleston Alley Cats	South Atlantic League	Razor Shines
Rookie	Princeton Reds	Appalachian League	Brad Kelley
Rookie	Billings Mustangs	Pioneer League	Donnie Scott
