= 1995 San Francisco Giants season =

1995 San Francisco Giants
- League: National League
- Division: West
- Ballpark: Candlestick Park
- City: San Francisco
- Owners: Peter Magowan
- General managers: Bob Quinn
- Managers: Dusty Baker
- Television: KTVU (Ted Robinson, Mike Krukow); SportsChannel Pacific (Mike Krukow, Duane Kuiper)
- Radio: KNBR (Ted Robinson, Hank Greenwald, Mike Krukow, Duane Kuiper); SP Radio (Julio Gonzalez, Rene De La Rosa)

The 1995 San Francisco Giants season was the Giants' 113th season in Major League Baseball, their 38th season in San Francisco since their move from New York following the 1957 season, and their 36th at Candlestick Park, renamed 3Com Park at Candlestick Point that year. The team finished in fourth place in the National League West with a 67–77 record, 11 games behind the Los Angeles Dodgers.

== Offseason ==
- November 8, 1994: Kent Bottenfield was released by the San Francisco Giants.
- January 2, 1995: Sergio Valdez was signed as a free agent by the Giants.
- February 8, 1995: Darryl Strawberry was released by the Giants.
- April 8, 1995: Terry Mulholland was signed as a free agent by the Giants.
- April 9, 1995: Glenallen Hill was signed as a free agent by the San Francisco Giants.

== Regular season ==
=== Season standings ===
NL West
Team	W	L	Pct.	GB	Home	Road
Los Angeles Dodgers	78	66	.542	—	39‍–‍33	39‍–‍33
Colorado Rockies	77	67	.535	1	44‍–‍28	33‍–‍39
San Diego Padres	70	74	.486	8	40‍–‍32	30‍–‍42
San Francisco Giants	67	77	.465	11	37‍–‍35	30‍–‍42

=== Record vs. opponents ===
1995 National League record Source: MLB Standings Grid – 1995
Team	ATL	CHC	CIN	COL	FLA	HOU	LAD	MON	NYM	PHI	PIT	SD	SF	STL
Atlanta	—	8–4	8–5	9–4	10–3	6–6	5–4	9–4	5–8	7–6	4–2	5–2	7–1	7–5
Chicago	4–8	—	3–7	6–7	8–4	5–8	7–5	3–5	4–3	6–1	8–5	5–7	5–7	9–4
Cincinnati	5–8	7–3	—	5–7	6–6	12–1	4–3	8–4	7–5	9–3	8–5	3–6	3–3	8–5
Colorado	4–9	7–6	7–5	—	5–7	4–4	4–9	7–1	5–4	4–2	8–4	9–4	8–5	5–7
Florida	3–10	4–8	6–6	7–5	—	8–4	3–7	6–7	7–6	6–7	5–8	3–2	5–3	4–3
Houston	6–6	8–5	1–12	4–4	4–8	—	3–2	9–3	6–6	5–7	9–4	7–4	5–3	9–4
Los Angeles	4–5	5–7	3–4	9–4	7–3	2–3	—	7–5	6–6	4–9	9–4	7–6	8–5	7–5
Montreal	4–9	5–3	4–8	1–7	7–6	3–9	5–7	—	7–6	8–5	4–4	7–5	7–6	4–3
New York	8–5	3–4	5–7	4–5	6–7	6–6	6–6	6–7	—	7–6	4–3	6–7	5–8	3–4
Philadelphia	6-7	1–6	3–9	2–4	7–6	7–5	9–4	5–8	6–7	—	6–3	6–6	6–6	5–4
Pittsburgh	2–4	5–8	5–8	4–8	8–5	4–9	4–9	4–4	3–4	3–6	—	4–8	6–6	6–7
San Diego	2–5	7–5	6–3	4–9	2–3	4–7	6–7	5–7	7–6	6–6	8–4	—	6–7	7–5
San Francisco	1–7	7–5	3–3	5–8	3–5	3–5	5–8	6–7	8–5	6–6	6–6	7–6	—	7–6
St. Louis	5–7	4–9	5–8	7–5	3–4	4-9	5–7	3–4	4–3	4–5	7–6	5–7	6–7	—

=== Notable transactions ===
- July 21, 1995: Mark Portugal, Dave Burba and Darren Lewis were traded by the Giants to the Cincinnati Reds for Ricky Pickett, John Roper, Deion Sanders, Scott Service, and David McCarty.

=== Roster ===
1995 San Francisco Giants
Roster
Pitchers: 72 Luis Aquino; 14 Shawn Barton; 33,38 José Bautista; 47 Rod Beck; 30 Jamie Brewington; 34 Dave Burba; 51 Enrique Burgos; 40 Mark Dewey; 36 Shawn Estes; 41 Steve Frey; 29,38 Pat Gomez; 36 Kenny Greer; 37 Chris Hook; 31 Mark Leiter; 26 Steve Mintz; 45,46 Terry Mulholland; 19 Mark Portugal; 42 John Roper; 53 Joe Rosselli; 34 Scott Service; 35 Salomón Torres; 35 Carlos Valdez; 41 Sergio Valdez; 50 William Van Landingham; 32 Trevor Wilson	Catchers: 49 Tom Lampkin; 8 Kirt Manwaring; 52 Jeff Reed; Infielders: 57 Rich Aurilia; 18 Mike Benjamin; 14 Todd Benzinger; 45,46 Mark Carreon; 10 Royce Clayton; 7 John Patterson; 13,17 J. R. Phillips; 23 Steve Scarsone; 6 Robby Thompson; 9 Matt Williams	Outfielders: 56 Marvin Benard; 25 Barry Bonds; 39 Rikkert Faneyte; 1 Glenallen Hill; 2 Mark Leonard; 2 Darren Lewis; 22 David McCarty; 21 Deion Sanders	Manager: 12 Dusty Baker; Coaches: 16 Bobby Bonds (hitting/first base); 15 Bob Brenly (bullpen); 20 Wendell Kim (third base); 5 Bob Lillis (bench); 48 Dick Pole (pitching)

== Player stats ==
=== Batting ===
==== Starters by position ====
Note: Pos = Position; G = Games played; AB = At bats; H = Hits; Avg. = Batting average; HR = Home runs; RBI = Runs batted in

Pos	Player	G	AB	H	Avg.	HR	RBI
C	Kirt Manwaring	118	379	95	.251	4	36
1B	Mark Carreon	117	396	119	.301	17	65
2B	Robby Thompson	95	336	75	.223	8	23
SS	Royce Clayton	138	509	124	.244	5	58
3B	Matt Williams	76	283	95	.336	23	65
LF	Barry Bonds	144	506	149	.294	33	104
CF	Darren Lewis	74	309	78	.252	1	16
RF	Glenallen Hill	132	497	131	.264	24	86

==== Other batters ====
Note: G = Games played; AB = At bats; H = Hits; Avg. = Batting average; HR = Home runs; RBI = Runs batted in

Player	G	AB	H	Avg.	HR	RBI
Steve Scarsone	80	233	62	.266	11	29
J.R. Phillips	92	231	45	.195	9	28
Deion Sanders	52	214	61	.285	5	18
John Patterson	95	205	42	.205	1	14
Mike Benjamin	68	186	41	.220	3	12
Jeff Reed	66	113	30	.265	0	9
Rikkert Faneyte	46	86	17	.198	0	4
Tom Lampkin	65	76	21	.276	1	9
Marvin Benard	13	34	13	.382	1	4
Mark Leonard	14	21	4	.190	1	4
Dave McCarty	12	20	5	.250	0	2
Rich Aurilia	9	19	9	.474	2	4
Todd Benzinger	9	10	2	.200	1	2

=== Pitching ===
==== Starting pitchers ====
Note: G = Games pitched; IP = Innings pitched; W = Wins; L = Losses; ERA = Earned run average; SO = Strikeouts

Player	G	IP	W	L	ERA	SO
Mark Leiter	30	195.2	10	12	3.82	129
Terry Mulholland	29	149.0	5	13	5.80	65
William Van Landingham	18	122.2	6	3	3.67	95
Mark Portugal	17	104.0	5	5	4.15	63
Trevor Wilson	17	82.2	3	4	3.92	38
Jamie Brewington	13	75.1	6	4	4.54	45
Sergio Valdez	13	66.1	4	5	4.75	29
Shawn Estes	3	17.1	0	3	6.75	14

==== Other pitchers ====
Note: G = Games pitched; IP = Innings pitched; W = Wins; L = Losses; ERA = Earned run average; SO = Strikeouts

Player	G	IP	W	L	ERA	SO
José Bautista	52	100.2	3	8	6.44	45
Joe Rosselli	9	30.0	2	1	8.70	7
Salomón Torres	4	8.0	0	1	9.00	2

==== Relief pitchers ====
Note: G = Games pitched; W = Wins; L = Losses; SV = Saves; ERA = Earned run average; SO = Strikeouts

Player	G	W	L	SV	ERA	SO
Rod Beck	60	5	6	33	4.45	42
Shawn Barton	52	4	1	1	4.26	22
Chris Hook	45	5	1	0	5.50	40
Dave Burba	37	4	2	0	4.98	46
Scott Service	28	3	1	0	3.19	30
Mark Dewey	27	1	0	0	3.13	32
Pat Gomez	18	0	0	0	5.14	15
Steve Mintz	14	1	2	0	7.45	7
Carlos Valdez	11	0	1	0	6.14	7
Steve Frey	9	0	1	0	4.26	5
Kenny Greer	8	0	2	0	5.25	7
Enrique Burgos	5	0	0	0	8.64	12
Luis Aquino	5	0	1	0	14.40	4
John Roper	1	0	0	0	27.00	0

== Awards and honors ==
- Mark Carreon 1B, Willie Mac Award

All-Star Game

== Farm system ==
Level	Team	League	Manager
AAA	Phoenix Firebirds	Pacific Coast League	Keith Bodie and Jim Davenport
AA	Shreveport Captains	Texas League	Ron Wotus
A	San Jose Giants	California League	Carlos Lezcano
A	Burlington Bees	Midwest League	Mike Hart
A-Short Season	Bellingham Giants	Northwest League	Glenn Tufts

LEAGUE CHAMPIONS: Shreveport
