= 1995 Philadelphia Phillies season =

Major League Baseball season

1995 Philadelphia Phillies
- League: National League
- Division: East
- Ballpark: Veterans Stadium
- City: Philadelphia
- Record: 69–75 (.479)
- Divisional place: 3rd
- Owners: Bill Giles
- General managers: Lee Thomas
- Managers: Jim Fregosi
- Television: WPHL-TV; PRISM; SportsChannel Philadelphia (Harry Kalas, Richie Ashburn, Andy Musser, Chris Wheeler, Garry Maddox, Todd Kalas)
- Radio: WGMP (Harry Kalas, Richie Ashburn, Andy Musser, Chris Wheeler)

The 1995 Philadelphia Phillies season was the 113th season in the history of the franchise.

== Regular season ==
The Phillies were in first place for the majority of the first half, thanks to a 37–18 start to the season. However, injuries took their toll, and they went on a 3–16 skid in early July. An eight-game losing streak in August knocked them out of contention.

=== Season standings ===
NL East
Team	W	L	Pct.	GB	Home	Road
Atlanta Braves	90	54	.625	—	44‍–‍28	46‍–‍26
New York Mets	69	75	.479	21	40‍–‍32	29‍–‍43
Philadelphia Phillies	69	75	.479	21	35‍–‍37	34‍–‍38
Florida Marlins	67	76	.469	22½	37‍–‍34	30‍–‍42
Montreal Expos	66	78	.458	24	31‍–‍41	35‍–‍37

=== Record vs. opponents ===
1995 National League record Source: MLB Standings Grid – 1995
Team	ATL	CHC	CIN	COL	FLA	HOU	LAD	MON	NYM	PHI	PIT	SD	SF	STL
Atlanta	—	8–4	8–5	9–4	10–3	6–6	5–4	9–4	5–8	7–6	4–2	5–2	7–1	7–5
Chicago	4–8	—	3–7	6–7	8–4	5–8	7–5	3–5	4–3	6–1	8–5	5–7	5–7	9–4
Cincinnati	5–8	7–3	—	5–7	6–6	12–1	4–3	8–4	7–5	9–3	8–5	3–6	3–3	8–5
Colorado	4–9	7–6	7–5	—	5–7	4–4	4–9	7–1	5–4	4–2	8–4	9–4	8–5	5–7
Florida	3–10	4–8	6–6	7–5	—	8–4	3–7	6–7	7–6	6–7	5–8	3–2	5–3	4–3
Houston	6–6	8–5	1–12	4–4	4–8	—	3–2	9–3	6–6	5–7	9–4	7–4	5–3	9–4
Los Angeles	4–5	5–7	3–4	9–4	7–3	2–3	—	7–5	6–6	4–9	9–4	7–6	8–5	7–5
Montreal	4–9	5–3	4–8	1–7	7–6	3–9	5–7	—	7–6	8–5	4–4	7–5	7–6	4–3
New York	8–5	3–4	5–7	4–5	6–7	6–6	6–6	6–7	—	7–6	4–3	6–7	5–8	3–4
Philadelphia	6-7	1–6	3–9	2–4	7–6	7–5	9–4	5–8	6–7	—	6–3	6–6	6–6	5–4
Pittsburgh	2–4	5–8	5–8	4–8	8–5	4–9	4–9	4–4	3–4	3–6	—	4–8	6–6	6–7
San Diego	2–5	7–5	6–3	4–9	2–3	4–7	6–7	5–7	7–6	6–6	8–4	—	6–7	7–5
San Francisco	1–7	7–5	3–3	5–8	3–5	3–5	5–8	6–7	8–5	6–6	6–6	7–6	—	7–6
St. Louis	5–7	4–9	5–8	7–5	3–4	4-9	5–7	3–4	4–3	4–5	7–6	5–7	6–7	—

=== Notable transactions ===
- April 6, 1995: Charlie Hayes signed as a free agent with the Philadelphia Phillies.
- April 14, 1995: Mariano Duncan was signed as a free agent with the Philadelphia Phillies.
- April 20, 1995: Gary Varsho signed as a free agent with the Philadelphia Phillies.
- June 1, 1995: Future Heisman Trophy winner Ricky Williams was selected out of high school in the 8th round of the 1995 draft by the Philadelphia Phillies. Williams was the 14th pick of the 8th round and the 213th overall. Williams played shortstop at Patrick Henry HS in San Diego, CA.
- June 18, 1995: Andy Van Slyke was traded by the Baltimore Orioles to the Philadelphia Phillies for Gene Harris.
- July 7, 1995: Kevin Elster was signed as a free agent with the Philadelphia Phillies.
- July 24, 1995: Mark Whiten was traded by the Boston Red Sox to the Philadelphia Phillies for Dave Hollins.
- August 8, 1995: Mariano Duncan was selected off waivers by the Cincinnati Reds from the Philadelphia Phillies.

=== 1995 Game Log ===
Legend
	Phillies win
	Phillies loss
	Postponement
**Bold**	Phillies team member

1995 Game Log
Overall Record: 69–75
April (2–2)

#	Date	Opponent	Score	Win	Loss	Save	Attendance	Record
1	April 26	@ Cardinals	6–7	René Arocha (1–0)	**Norm Charlton** (0–1)	None	33,539	0–1
2	April 27	@ Cardinals	6–2	**David West** (1–0)	Danny Jackson (0–1)	None	21,741	1–1
3	April 28	Pirates	5–2	**Paul Quantrill** (1–0)	Denny Neagle (0–1)	**Heathcliff Slocumb** (1)	47,088	2–1
4	April 29	Pirates	2–3	Esteban Loaiza (1–0)	**Tyler Green** (0–1)	Jim Gott (1)	27,530	2–2
–	April 30	Pirates	Postponed (rain); Makeup: July 26 as a traditional double-header					

May (21–7)

#	Date	Opponent	Score	Win	Loss	Save	Attendance	Record
5	May 2	@ Reds	6–0	**Curt Schilling** (1–0)	José Rijo (0–2)	None	19,389	3–2
6	May 3	@ Reds	2–7	Xavier Hernandez (1–0)	**Norm Charlton** (0–2)	Jeff Brantley (1)	17,480	3–3
7	May 4	@ Reds	6–4	**Gene Harris** (1–0)	Héctor Carrasco (0–3)	**Heathcliff Slocumb** (2)	17,675	4–3
8	May 5	@ Braves	9–4	**Tyler Green** (1–1)	Kent Mercker (0–1)	**Toby Borland** (1)	33,296	5–3
9	May 6	@ Braves	3–1	**Mike Mimbs** (1–0)	John Smoltz (1–1)	**Heathcliff Slocumb** (3)	37,850	6–3
10	May 7	@ Braves	5–4	**Curt Schilling** (2–0)	Steve Bedrosian (0–1)	**Heathcliff Slocumb** (4)	34,166	7–3
11	May 8	@ Braves	3–2	**Kyle Abbott** (1–0)	Tom Glavine (1–1)	**Heathcliff Slocumb** (5)	27,266	8–3
12	May 9	Expos	8–3	**Paul Quantrill** (2–0)	Butch Henry (0–2)	None	21,138	9–3
13	May 10	Expos	10–1	**Tyler Green** (2–1)	Gil Heredia (1–2)	None	20,708	10–3
14	May 11	Expos	1–13	Carlos Pérez (1–0)	**Mike Mimbs** (1–1)	None	27,665	10–4
15	May 12	@ Astros	5–2	**Curt Schilling** (3–0)	Doug Drabek (1–2)	**Heathcliff Slocumb** (6)	30,828	11–4
16	May 13	@ Astros	7–5	**Ricky Bottalico** (1–0)	Darryl Kile (1–2)	**Heathcliff Slocumb** (7)	18,073	12–4
17	May 14	@ Astros	5–2	**Paul Quantrill** (3–0)	Mike Hampton (1–2)	**Heathcliff Slocumb** (8)	12,286	13–4
18	May 15	@ Marlins	1–9	John Burkett (3–2)	**Tyler Green** (2–2)	None	17,897	13–5
19	May 16	@ Marlins	9–7 (10)	**Heathcliff Slocumb** (1–0)	Robb Nen (0–2)	None	19,348	14–5
20	May 17	@ Marlins	3–1 (13)	**Ricky Bottalico** (2–0)	Richie Lewis (0–1)	**Heathcliff Slocumb** (9)	21,375	15–5
21	May 19	Mets	1–5	Eric Gunderson (1–0)	**Paul Quantrill** (3–1)	None	31,601	15–6
22	May 20	Mets	10–8	**Tyler Green** (3–2)	Pete Harnisch (0–1)	**Heathcliff Slocumb** (10)	38,829	16–6
23	May 21	Mets	5–3	**Mike Mimbs** (2–1)	Bobby J. Jones (3–2)	**Heathcliff Slocumb** (11)	43,134	17–6
24	May 23	Giants	6–5	**Gene Harris** (2–0)	Rod Beck (3–2)	None	22,418	18–6
25	May 24	Giants	2–1	**Norm Charlton** (1–2)	Trevor Wilson (2–2)	**Heathcliff Slocumb** (12)	21,131	19–6
26	May 25	Giants	1–3 (6)	Mark Leiter (2–1)	**Tyler Green** (3–3)	None	20,539	19–7
27	May 26	Padres	2–0	**Mike Mimbs** (3–1)	Andy Benes (0–5)	None	21,032	20–7
28	May 27	Padres	5–4 (10)	**Kyle Abbott** (2–0)	Dustin Hermanson (3–1)	None	33,719	21–7
29	May 28	Padres	5–13 (10)	Trevor Hoffman (3–0)	**Gene Harris** (2–1)	None	33,303	21–8
30	May 29	Dodgers	8–6	**Paul Quantrill** (4–1)	Pedro Astacio (1–2)	**Heathcliff Slocumb** (13)	27,426	22–8
31	May 30	Dodgers	5–0	**Tyler Green** (4–3)	Tom Candiotti (2–4)	None	26,014	23–8
32	May 31	Dodgers	1–4 (10)	Ramón Martínez (5–3)	**Ricky Bottalico** (2–1)	Todd Worrell (4)	22,480	23–9

June (15–12)

#	Date	Opponent	Score	Win	Loss	Save	Attendance	Record
33	June 1	Cubs	5–3	**Norm Charlton** (2–2)	Steve Trachsel (2–2)	**Heathcliff Slocumb** (14)	26,149	24–9
34	June 2	@ Giants	2–4	Rod Beck (4–2)	**Gene Harris** (2–2)	None	12,484	24–10
35	June 3	@ Giants	1–3	Trevor Wilson (3–2)	**Paul Quantrill** (4–2)	Rod Beck (8)	16,587	24–11
36	June 4	@ Giants	0–4	Mark Leiter (3–1)	**Tyler Green** (4–4)	None	22,838	24–12
37	June 5	@ Padres	4–5 (10)	Trevor Hoffman (4–1)	**Norm Charlton** (2–3)	None	7,233	24–13
38	June 6	@ Padres	0–1	Fernando Valenzuela (2–2)	**Mike Williams** (0–1)	Trevor Hoffman (6)	8,891	24–14
39	June 7	@ Padres	7–1	**Curt Schilling** (4–0)	Andy Ashby (2–4)	None	9,749	25–14
40	June 9	@ Dodgers	4–0	**Paul Quantrill** (5–2)	Pedro Astacio (1–4)	None	29,679	26–14
41	June 10	@ Dodgers	3–0	**Tyler Green** (5–4)	Tom Candiotti (2–5)	None	37,220	27–14
42	June 11	@ Dodgers	2–1	**Mike Mimbs** (4–1)	Ramón Martínez (6–4)	**Heathcliff Slocumb** (15)	32,223	28–14
43	June 13	Astros	5–6	Dave Veres (3–1)	**Curt Schilling** (4–1)	John Hudek (7)	20,311	28–15
44	June 14	Astros	5–9	Darryl Kile (2–5)	**Norm Charlton** (2–4)	Todd Jones (2)	24,933	28–16
45	June 15	Astros	4–2	**Ricky Bottalico** (3–1)	John Hudek (2–2)	None	29,411	29–16
46	June 16	Marlins	1–2	Pat Rapp (2–3)	**David West** (1–1)	Robb Nen (4)	29,092	29–17
47	June 17	Marlins	11–4	**Mike Mimbs** (5–1)	David Weathers (1–3)	None	37,843	30–17
48	June 18	Marlins	5–3	**Curt Schilling** (5–1)	Yorkis Pérez (0–2)	**Heathcliff Slocumb** (16)	40,105	31–17
49	June 19	@ Mets	6–3	**Paul Quantrill** (6–2)	Dave Mlicki (4–3)	**Heathcliff Slocumb** (17)	14,250	32–17
50	June 20	@ Mets	8–2	**Tyler Green** (6–4)	Pete Harnisch (1–4)	None	15,308	33–17
51	June 21	@ Mets	6–2	**David West** (2–1)	Bobby J. Jones (4–4)	**Ricky Bottalico** (1)	14,446	34–17
52	June 22	@ Mets	8–2	**Mike Mimbs** (6–1)	Bill Pulsipher (0–2)	None	15,216	35–17
53	June 23	@ Cardinals	1–7	Mike Morgan (3–2)	**Curt Schilling** (5–2)	None	29,375	35–18
54	June 24	@ Cardinals	10–9	**Paul Quantrill** (7–2)	Ken Hill (4–4)	**Heathcliff Slocumb** (18)	24,013	36–18
55	June 25	@ Cardinals	5–3	**Tyler Green** (7–4)	Tom Urbani (1–3)	**Heathcliff Slocumb** (19)	24,304	37–18
56	June 27	Reds	3–12	John Smiley (7–1)	**Mike Mimbs** (6–2)	Xavier Hernandez (3)	25,020	37–19
57	June 28	Reds	0–1	C. J. Nitkowski (1–1)	**Curt Schilling** (5–3)	Jeff Brantley (12)	26,579	37–20
58	June 29	Reds	4–10	Pete Schourek (6–4)	**Paul Quantrill** (7–3)	None	33,614	37–21
59	June 30	Braves	3–1	**Tyler Green** (8–4)	John Smoltz (7–4)	**Heathcliff Slocumb** (20)	32,821	38–21

July (9–20)

#	Date	Opponent	Score	Win	Loss	Save	Attendance	Record
60	July 1	Braves	1–3	Greg Maddux (8–1)	**David West** (2–2)	None	33,375	38–22
61	July 2	Braves	3–5	Tom Glavine (7–4)	**Mike Mimbs** (6–3)	Mark Wohlers (6)	35,648	38–23
62	July 3	Braves	4–10	Steve Avery (3–5)	**Curt Schilling** (5–4)	None	59,203	38–24
63	July 4	@ Pirates	0–7	John Ericks (1–1)	**Paul Quantrill** (7–4)	None	23,334	38–25
64	July 5	@ Pirates	4–7	Dan Plesac (3–0)	**Norm Charlton** (2–5)	None	9,245	38–26
65	July 6	@ Pirates	10–5	**David West** (3–2)	Steve Parris (1–2)	None	10,039	39–26
66	July 7	Cubs	2–8	Jim Bullinger (6–1)	**Mike Mimbs** (6–4)	Bryan Hickerson (1)	52,516	39–27
67	July 8	Cubs	1–3	Jaime Navarro (7–2)	**Curt Schilling** (5–5)	Randy Myers (21)	31,892	39–28
68	July 9	Cubs	6–7 (13)	Turk Wendell (2–0)	**Mike Williams** (0–2)	None	34,669	39–29
–	July 11	**1995 Major League Baseball All-Star Game at The Ballpark in Arlington in Arlington**						
69	July 12	Cardinals	3–4	Danny Jackson (2–9)	**Mike Mimbs** (6–5)	Tom Henke (18)	24,327	39–30
70	July 13	@ Expos	4–3	**Curt Schilling** (6–5)	Jeff Fassero (8–7)	**Heathcliff Slocumb** (21)	16,991	40–30
71	July 14	@ Expos	2–8	Pedro Martínez (7–5)	**Tyler Green** (8–5)	None	15,921	40–31
72	July 15	@ Expos	3–5	Butch Henry (4–7)	**Paul Quantrill** (7–5)	Mel Rojas (16)	30,100	40–32
73	July 16	@ Expos	1–5	Carlos Pérez (8–2)	**Sid Fernandez** (0–5)	Mel Rojas (17)	22,345	40–33
74	July 17	@ Rockies	5–8	Mike Munoz (2–2)	**Ricky Bottalico** (3–2)	Darren Holmes (8)	48,070	40–34
75	July 18	@ Rockies	7–5	**Curt Schilling** (7–5)	Kevin Ritz (7–5)	**Heathcliff Slocumb** (22)	48,011	41–34
76	July 19	@ Rockies	3–5	Bryan Rekar (1–0)	**Tyler Green** (8–6)	Darren Holmes (9)	48,087	41–35
77	July 20	@ Rockies	3–7	Bill Swift (6–2)	**Paul Quantrill** (7–6)	None	48,037	41–36
78	July 21	Cardinals	7–0	**Sid Fernandez** (1–5)	Donovan Osborne (0–3)	**Toby Borland** (2)	28,468	42–36
79	July 22	Cardinals	3–5 (11)	Rich DeLucia (5–4)	**Omar Olivares** (1–4)	Tom Henke (22)	35,513	42–37
80	July 23	Cardinals	10–6	**Paul Quantrill** (8–6)	Ken Hill (6–7)	**Toby Borland** (3)	30,104	43–37
81	July 24	Rockies	3–11	Bryan Rekar (2–0)	**Tyler Green** (8–7)	None	25,424	43–38
82	July 25	Rockies	7–6 (10)	**Heathcliff Slocumb** (2–0)	Mike Munoz (2–3)	None	25,837	44–38
83	July 26 (1)	Pirates	2–1 (11)	**Toby Borland** (1–0)	Dan Plesac (3–3)	None	see 2nd game	45–38
84	July 26 (2)	Pirates	6–4	**Paul Quantrill** (9–6)	Mike Dyer (3–2)	**Heathcliff Slocumb** (23)	32,517	46–38
85	July 27	Pirates	6–4	**Mike Mimbs** (7–5)	John Ericks (2–3)	**Heathcliff Slocumb** (24)	31,955	47–38
86	July 28	@ Cubs	0–4	Frank Castillo (7–5)	**Bobby Muñoz** (0–1)	Randy Myers (24)	31,629	47–39
87	July 29	@ Cubs	7–8	Anthony Young (1–3)	**Heathcliff Slocumb** (2–1)	None	38,768	47–40
88	July 30	@ Cubs	0–8	Jim Bullinger (8–2)	**Jim Deshaies** (0–1)	None	32,797	47–41

August (13–16)

#	Date	Opponent	Score	Win	Loss	Save	Attendance	Record
89	August 1	@ Braves	4–3	**Sid Fernandez** (2–5)	Steve Avery (4–7)	**Heathcliff Slocumb** (25)	38,579	48–41
90	August 2	@ Braves	5–7	Kent Mercker (5–6)	**Bobby Muñoz** (0–2)	Mark Wohlers (12)	39,594	48–42
91	August 3	@ Braves	4–5	Pedro Borbón (1–1)	**Heathcliff Slocumb** (2–2)	None	37,971	48–43
92	August 4	@ Reds	0–1	John Smiley (11–1)	**Jeff Juden** (0–1)	Jeff Brantley (23)	30,668	48–44
–	August 5	@ Reds	Postponed (rain); Makeup: August 6 as a traditional double-header					
93	August 6 (1)	@ Reds	1–6	Pete Schourek (12–5)	**Tommy Greene** (0–1)	None	see 2nd game	48–45
94	August 6 (2)	@ Reds	1–2 (10)	Mike Jackson (5–0)	**Heathcliff Slocumb** (2–3)	None	34,784	48–46
95	August 8	Mets	10–12	Reid Cornelius (1–1)	**Tyler Green** (8–8)	John Franco (14)	28,536	48–47
96	August 9	Mets	0–4	Jason Isringhausen (2–1)	**Paul Quantrill** (9–7)	None	36,147	48–48
97	August 10	Mets	1–5 (11)	Don Florence (1–0)	**Heathcliff Slocumb** (2–4)	None	24,795	48–49
98	August 11	Expos	6–5	**Sid Fernandez** (3–5)	Carlos Pérez (10–4)	**Heathcliff Slocumb** (26)	25,194	49–49
99	August 12	Expos	3–4	Jeff Fassero (11–9)	**Tommy Greene** (0–2)	Dave Leiper (2)	37,267	49–50
100	August 13	Expos	2–3	Tim Scott (1–0)	**Ricky Bottalico** (3–3)	Mel Rojas (21)	31,528	49–51
101	August 14	Expos	1–5	Pedro Martínez (11–7)	**Paul Quantrill** (9–8)	None	25,835	49–52
102	August 15	@ Astros	3–2	**Jeff Juden** (1–1)	Greg Swindell (7–7)	**Heathcliff Slocumb** (27)	13,516	50–52
103	August 16	@ Astros	4–5	Dean Hartgraves (1–0)	**Heathcliff Slocumb** (2–5)	None	13,000	50–53
104	August 17	@ Astros	3–2	**Paul Fletcher** (1–0)	Todd Jones (6–3)	**Toby Borland** (4)	12,587	51–53
105	August 18	Giants	16–8	**Mike Mimbs** (8–5)	Chris Hook (5–1)	None	23,409	52–53
106	August 19	Giants	6–4	**Ricky Bottalico** (4–3)	Sergio Valdez (1–3)	**Heathcliff Slocumb** (28)	25,712	53–53
107	August 20	Giants	8–7 (10)	**Heathcliff Slocumb** (3–5)	José Bautista (2–8)	None	30,176	54–53
108	August 21	Padres	3–1	**Sid Fernandez** (4–5)	Andy Ashby (9–7)	**Toby Borland** (5)	22,865	55–53
109	August 22	Padres	3–5	Fernando Valenzuela (3–3)	**Tommy Greene** (0–3)	Trevor Hoffman (25)	28,325	55–54
110	August 23	Padres	12–8	**Mike Williams** (1–2)	Glenn Dishman (4–6)	**Mike Mimbs** (1)	21,017	56–54
111	August 24	Dodgers	7–6 (11)	**Heathcliff Slocumb** (4–5)	Rudy Seánez (1–3)	None	24,448	57–54
112	August 25	Dodgers	17–4	**Jeff Juden** (2–1)	Hideo Nomo (10–5)	None	33,230	58–54
113	August 26	Dodgers	9–4	**Sid Fernandez** (5–5)	Ismael Valdez (11–8)	None	30,126	59–54
114	August 27	Dodgers	1–9	Kevin Tapani (8–12)	**Tommy Greene** (0–4)	None	32,889	59–55
115	August 29	@ Giants	4–6	Terry Mulholland (4–10)	**Paul Quantrill** (9–9)	Rod Beck (25)	11,304	59–56
116	August 30	@ Giants	1–4	William Van Landingham (5–3)	**Jeff Juden** (2–2)	Rod Beck (26)	11,635	59–57
117	August 31	@ Giants	6–0	**Sid Fernandez** (6–5)	Jamie Brewington (4–2)	None	11,265	60–57

September (9–17)

#	Date	Opponent	Score	Win	Loss	Save	Attendance	Record
118	September 1	@ Padres	3–6	Fernando Valenzuela (5–3)	**Mike Grace** (0–1)	Trevor Hoffman (26)	18,125	60–58
119	September 2	@ Padres	5–6 (11)	Trevor Hoffman (6–4)	**Heathcliff Slocumb** (4–6)	None	18,401	60–59
120	September 3	@ Padres	3–2	**Paul Quantrill** (10–9)	Joey Hamilton (6–7)	**Heathcliff Slocumb** (29)	14,783	61–59
121	September 4	@ Dodgers	1–5	Tom Candiotti (7–12)	**Jeff Juden** (2–3)	None	44,910	61–60
122	September 5	@ Dodgers	1–2	John Cummings (2–1)	**Toby Borland** (1–1)	None	39,406	61–61
123	September 6	@ Dodgers	1–0	**Mike Grace** (1–1)	Ismael Valdez (11–10)	**Heathcliff Slocumb** (30)	29,835	62–61
124	September 8	Astros	3–12	Mike Hampton (9–6)	**Tyler Green** (8–9)	None	24,059	62–62
125	September 9	Astros	6–4 (11)	**Heathcliff Slocumb** (5–6)	Mike Henneman (0–2)	None	25,665	63–62
126	September 10	Astros	4–5	Doug Drabek (9–8)	**Jeff Juden** (2–4)	Mike Henneman (22)	27,235	63–63
127	September 12	@ Expos	8–2	**Mike Williams** (2–2)	Tavo Álvarez (1–3)	**Toby Borland** (6)	11,246	64–63
128	September 13	@ Expos	4–5	Gil Heredia (5–6)	**Dennis Springer** (0–1)	Mel Rojas (27)	11,335	64–64
129	September 14	@ Pirates	7–2	**Paul Quantrill** (11–9)	Paul Wagner (4–15)	None	7,770	65–64
130	September 15	@ Mets	1–4	Jason Isringhausen (7–2)	**Mike Mimbs** (8–6)	John Franco (24)	15,637	65–65
131	September 16	@ Mets	8–10	Dave Telgheder (1–1)	**Tommy Greene** (0–5)	John Franco (25)	18,351	65–66
132	September 17	@ Mets	2–8	Reid Cornelius (2–6)	**Mike Williams** (2–3)	Jerry Dipoto (2)	16,325	65–67
133	September 18	Marlins	13–10	**Ricky Bottalico** (5–3)	Randy Veres (4–4)	**Heathcliff Slocumb** (31)	17,736	66–67
134	September 19	Marlins	4–5	Yorkis Pérez (2–6)	**Toby Borland** (1–2)	Robb Nen (21)	19,555	66–68
135	September 20	Marlins	1–2	John Burkett (14–12)	**Paul Quantrill** (11–10)	None	17,885	66–69
136	September 21	Marlins	3–1	**Mike Mimbs** (9–6)	Willie Banks (2–6)	**Steve Frey** (1)	18,953	67–69
137	September 22	Reds	2–3	Dave Burba (10–3)	**Toby Borland** (1–3)	Jeff Brantley (26)	21,183	67–70
138	September 23	Reds	3–2 (13)	**Chuck Ricci** (1–0)	Xavier Hernandez (7–2)	None	23,315	68–70
139	September 24	Reds	4–6	David Wells (16–7)	**Dennis Springer** (0–2)	Jeff Brantley (27)	30,310	68–71
140	September 26	Braves	1–5	John Smoltz (12–7)	**Paul Quantrill** (11–11)	None	21,476	68–72
141	September 27	Braves	0–6	Greg Maddux (19–2)	**Mike Mimbs** (9–7)	None	26,636	68–73
142	September 29	@ Marlins	2–5	Chris Hammond (9–6)	**Dennis Springer** (0–3)	None	29,331	68–74
143	September 30	@ Marlins	3–2	**Mike Williams** (3–3)	John Burkett (14–14)	**Heathcliff Slocumb** (32)	39,183	69–74

October (0–1)

#	Date	Opponent	Score	Win	Loss	Save	Attendance	Record
144	October 1	@ Marlins	2–8	Ryan Bowen (2–0)	**Paul Quantrill** (11–12)	None	30,211	69–75

=== Roster ===
1995 Philadelphia Phillies
**Roster**
**Pitchers**: 39 Kyle Abbott; 42 Toby Borland; 52 Ricky Bottalico; 50,99 Andy Carter; 37 Norm Charlton; 44 Jim Deshaies; 50 Sid Fernandez; 58 Paul Fletcher; 29 Steve Frey; 44 Mike Grace; 28 Tyler Green; 49 Tommy Greene; 33 Gene Harris; 43 Jeff Juden; 52 Ryan Karp; 45 Mike Mimbs; 35 Bobby Muñoz; 00 Omar Olivares; 48 Paul Quantrill; 37 Chuck Ricci; 38 Curt Schilling; 51 Heathcliff Slocumb; 47 Dennis Springer; 40 David West; 41 Mike Williams	**Catchers**: 10 Darren Daulton; 24 Mike Lieberthal; 27 Lenny Webster; **Infielders**: 7 Mariano Duncan; 3 Kevin Elster; 13 Charlie Hayes; 15 Dave Hollins; 25 Gregg Jefferies; 23 Kevin Jordan; 12 Mickey Morandini; 31,23 Randy Ready; 6 Gene Schall; 31 Kevin Sefcik; 19 Kevin Stocker	**Outfielders**: 4 Lenny Dykstra; 8 Jim Eisenreich; 30 Kevin Flora; 17 Dave Gallagher; 16 Tony Longmire; 21 Tom Marsh; 34 Andy Van Slyke; 5 Gary Varsho; 22 Mark Whiten; **Other batters**: 15 Gary Bennett	**Manager**: 11 Jim Fregosi; **Coaches**: 2 Larry Bowa (third base); 14 Denis Menke (hitting); 46 Johnny Podres (pitching); 26 Mel Roberts (first base); 9 Mike Ryan (bullpen); 18 John Vukovich (bench)

== Player stats ==
=== Batting ===
==== Starters by position ====
Note: Pos= Position; G = Games played; AB = At bats; H = Hits; Avg. = Batting average; HR = Home runs; RBI = Runs batted in

Pos	Player	G	AB	H	Avg.	HR	RBI
C	Darren Daulton	98	342	85	.249	9	55
1B	Dave Hollins	65	205	47	.229	7	25
2B	Mickey Morandini	127	494	140	.283	6	49
SS	Kevin Stocker	125	412	90	.218	1	32
3B	Charlie Hayes	141	529	146	.276	11	85
LF	Gregg Jeffries	114	480	147	.306	11	56
CF	Andy Van Slyke	63	214	52	.243	3	16
RF	Jim Eisenreich	129	377	119	.316	10	55

==== Other batters ====
Note: G = Games played; AB = At bats; H = Hits; Avg. = Batting average; HR = Home runs; RBI = Runs batted in

Player	G	AB	H	Avg.	HR	RBI
Lenny Dykstra	62	254	67	.264	2	18
Mark Whiten	60	212	57	.269	11	37
Mariano Duncan	52	196	56	.286	3	23
Dave Gallagher	62	157	50	.318	1	12
Lenny Webster	49	150	40	.267	4	14
Tom Marsh	43	109	32	.294	3	15
Tony Longmire	59	104	37	.356	3	19
Gary Varsho	72	103	26	.252	0	11
Kevin Flora	24	75	16	.213	2	7
Gene Schall	24	65	15	.231	0	5
Kevin Jordan	24	54	10	.185	2	6
Kevin Elster	26	53	11	.208	1	9
Mike Lieberthal	16	47	12	.255	0	4
Randy Ready	23	29	4	.138	0	0
Kevin Sefcik	5	4	0	.000	0	0
Gary Bennett	1	1	0	.000	0	0

=== Pitching ===
==== Starting pitchers ====
Note: G = Games pitched; IP = Innings pitched; W = Wins; L = Losses; ERA = Earned run average; SO = Strikeouts

Player	G	IP	W	L	ERA	SO
Paul Quantrill	33	179.1	11	12	4.67	103
Tyler Green	26	140.2	8	9	5.31	85
Curt Schilling	17	116.0	7	5	3.57	114
Sid Fernandez	11	64.2	6	1	3.34	79
Jeff Juden	13	62.2	2	4	4.02	47
David West	8	38.0	3	2	3.79	25
Dennis Springer	4	22.1	0	3	4.84	15
Bobby Muñoz	3	15.2	0	2	5.74	6
Mike Grace	2	11.1	1	1	3.18	7
Jim Deshaies	2	5.1	0	1	20.25	6

==== Other pitchers ====
Note: G = Games pitched; IP = Innings pitched; W = Wins; L = Losses; ERA = Earned run average; SO = Strikeouts

Player	G	IP	W	L	ERA	SO
Mike Mimbs	35	136.2	9	7	4.15	93
Mike Williams	33	87.2	3	3	3.29	57
Tommy Greene	11	33.2	0	5	8.29	24

==== Relief pitchers ====
Note: G = Games pitched; W = Wins; L = Losses; SV = Saves; ERA = Earned run average; SO = Strikeouts

Player	G	W	L	SV	ERA	SO
Heathcliff Slocumb	61	5	6	32	2.89	63
Ricky Bottalico	62	5	3	1	2.46	87
Toby Borland	50	1	3	6	3.77	59
Norm Charlton	25	2	5	0	7.36	12
Gene Harris	21	2	2	0	4.26	9
Kyle Abbott	18	2	0	0	3.81	21
Russ Springer	14	0	0	0	3.71	32
Paul Fletcher	10	1	0	0	5.40	10
Steve Frey	9	0	0	1	0.84	2
Chuck Ricci	7	1	0	0	1.80	9
Omar Olivares	5	0	1	0	5.40	7
Andy Carter	4	0	0	0	6.14	6
Ryan Karp	1	0	0	0	4.50	2

== Farm system ==
Level	Team	League	Manager
AAA	Scranton/Wilkes-Barre; Red Barons	International League	Mike Quade
AA	Reading Phillies	Eastern League	Bill Dancy
A	Clearwater Phillies	Florida State League	Don McCormack
A	Piedmont Phillies	South Atlantic League	Roy Majtyka
A-Short Season	Batavia Clippers	New York–Penn League	Al LeBoeuf
Rookie	Martinsville Phillies	Appalachian League	Ramon Henderson

LEAGUE CHAMPIONS: Reading
