= David McCarty =

American baseball player (1969–2024)

- First baseman / Outfielder
- Born: November 23, 1969; Houston, Texas, U.S.
- Died: April 19, 2024 (aged 54); Oakland, California, U.S.
- Batted: Right Threw: Left

MLB debut
- May 17, 1993, for the Minnesota Twins

Last MLB appearance
- May 1, 2005, for the Boston Red Sox

MLB statistics
- Batting average: .242
- Home runs: 36
- Runs batted in: 175
- Stats at Baseball Reference

Teams
- Minnesota Twins (1993–1995); San Francisco Giants (1995–1996); Seattle Mariners (1998); Kansas City Royals (2000–2002); Tampa Bay Devil Rays (2002); Oakland Athletics (2003); Boston Red Sox (2003–2005)
Medals
Men's baseball
Representing United States
Goodwill Games
Bronze medal – third place	1990 Seattle	Team

David Andrew McCarty (November 23, 1969 – April 19, 2024) was an American first baseman and outfielder in Major League Baseball. From 1993 through 2005, McCarty played with the Minnesota Twins (1993–1995), San Francisco Giants (1995–1996), Seattle Mariners (1998), Kansas City Royals (2000–2002), Tampa Bay Devil Rays (2002), Oakland Athletics (2003) and Boston Red Sox (2003–2005). He batted right-handed and threw left-handed.

== High School and College ==
Born in Houston, McCarty graduated from Sharpstown High School in the city in 1988.

He attended Stanford University to play college baseball for the Stanford Cardinals where he enjoyed a legendary career. In 1989, he played collegiate summer baseball with the Cotuit Kettleers of the Cape Cod Baseball League.

During his sophomore season at Stanford in 1990, he hit .336 with 12 home runs and 69 RBIs to help lead the Cardinals to the 1990 College World Series. He would go on that year to play for Team USA in the Goodwill Games where he led the team with a .445 batting average.

The following year, he was named the 1991 Baseball America College Player of the Year Award Winner after posting a .420 batting average with 19 doubles, 24 home runs, and 66 RBIs in 238 at bats.

== Professional Career ==
The Minnesota Twins of Major League Baseball (MLB) selected McCarty in the first round, with the third overall selection, of the 1991 MLB draft. He made his MLB debut on May 17, 1993. In 1995, the Twins traded McCarty to the Cincinnati Reds for John Courtright.

On July 21, 1995, the Reds traded McCarty, Deion Sanders, Ricky Pickett, John Roper, and Scott Service to the San Francisco Giants for Dave Burba, Darren Lewis, and Mark Portugal. Before the 1998 season, the Seattle Mariners acquired McCarty from the Giants for Jalal Leach and Scott Smith. On August 4, 2003, McCarty was claimed off waivers by the Boston Red Sox from the Oakland Athletics.

=== 2004 highlights ===
On May 11, 2004, in the bottom of the eighth inning, original pinch-hitter Brian Daubach was called back to the bench after the Indians made a pitching change and decided to go to lefty Scott Stewart. McCarty, due to hitting well against lefties, was sent up to hit by manager Terry Francona. On an 0-1 pitch, McCarty lined a two-run triple to right field that gave the Red Sox a 5–3 lead. They went on to win by that score.

On May 30, 2004, McCarty, who had entered the game in the eighth inning, hit a walk-off two-run home run against Mariners pitcher J. J. Putz in the bottom of the twelfth inning to give the Red Sox a 9–7 victory.

McCarty also made three pitching appearances in 2004. The first one was in the home opener on April 9 vs the Blue Jays, the second one was on June 12 vs the Dodgers, in which he struck out Jayson Werth and the final one was in the final game of the regular season against the Orioles, in which he struck out Rafael Palmeiro, Larry Bigbie and David Newhan.

== Release and retirement ==
The Red Sox released McCarty in May 2005 after the team signed first baseman John Olerud. He retired and was a Red Sox analyst on NESN from July 1, 2005, until the end of the 2008 season.

== Personal life and death ==
McCarty lived in Piedmont, California, with his wife, novelist Monica McCarty, and their two children. He died following a cardiac event in Oakland, California, on April 19, 2024, at the age of 54.
