= 1995 Los Angeles Dodgers season =

1995 Los Angeles Dodgers
- National League West champions
- League: National League
- Division: Western
- Ballpark: Dodger Stadium
- City: Los Angeles
- Record: 78–66 (.542)
- Divisional place: 1st
- Owners: Peter O'Malley
- General managers: Fred Claire
- Managers: Tommy Lasorda
- Television: KTLA (5)
- Radio: KABC; Vin Scully, Ross Porter, Rick Monday; KWKW; Jaime Jarrín, René Cárdenas

The 1995 Los Angeles Dodgers season was the 106th for the franchise in Major League Baseball, and their 38th season in Los Angeles, California.

The season was notable for the American baseball debut of Japanese pitcher Hideo Nomo. In his first season with the Dodgers after an accomplished career in the Japanese leagues, Nomo went 13–6 with a 2.54 ERA and a league leading 236 strikeouts. He was the starting pitcher in the All-Star game and won the Rookie of the Year award. Similar to 'Fernandomania' in 1981, Nomo's success in his debut season was nickname 'Nomomania'.

The Dodgers won the National League West title, but lost to the Cincinnati Reds in the NLDS.

This was Tommy Lasorda's final full season as manager of the Dodgers. Midway through the next season, Lasorda would be replaced by his former shortstop Bill Russell.

== Regular season ==
=== Season standings ===
NL West
Team	W	L	Pct.	GB	Home	Road
Los Angeles Dodgers	78	66	.542	—	39‍–‍33	39‍–‍33
Colorado Rockies	77	67	.535	1	44‍–‍28	33‍–‍39
San Diego Padres	70	74	.486	8	40‍–‍32	30‍–‍42
San Francisco Giants	67	77	.465	11	37‍–‍35	30‍–‍42

=== Record vs. opponents ===
1995 National League record Source: MLB Standings Grid – 1995
Team	ATL	CHC	CIN	COL	FLA	HOU	LAD	MON	NYM	PHI	PIT	SD	SF	STL
Atlanta	—	8–4	8–5	9–4	10–3	6–6	5–4	9–4	5–8	7–6	4–2	5–2	7–1	7–5
Chicago	4–8	—	3–7	6–7	8–4	5–8	7–5	3–5	4–3	6–1	8–5	5–7	5–7	9–4
Cincinnati	5–8	7–3	—	5–7	6–6	12–1	4–3	8–4	7–5	9–3	8–5	3–6	3–3	8–5
Colorado	4–9	7–6	7–5	—	5–7	4–4	4–9	7–1	5–4	4–2	8–4	9–4	8–5	5–7
Florida	3–10	4–8	6–6	7–5	—	8–4	3–7	6–7	7–6	6–7	5–8	3–2	5–3	4–3
Houston	6–6	8–5	1–12	4–4	4–8	—	3–2	9–3	6–6	5–7	9–4	7–4	5–3	9–4
Los Angeles	4–5	5–7	3–4	9–4	7–3	2–3	—	7–5	6–6	4–9	9–4	7–6	8–5	7–5
Montreal	4–9	5–3	4–8	1–7	7–6	3–9	5–7	—	7–6	8–5	4–4	7–5	7–6	4–3
New York	8–5	3–4	5–7	4–5	6–7	6–6	6–6	6–7	—	7–6	4–3	6–7	5–8	3–4
Philadelphia	6-7	1–6	3–9	2–4	7–6	7–5	9–4	5–8	6–7	—	6–3	6–6	6–6	5–4
Pittsburgh	2–4	5–8	5–8	4–8	8–5	4–9	4–9	4–4	3–4	3–6	—	4–8	6–6	6–7
San Diego	2–5	7–5	6–3	4–9	2–3	4–7	6–7	5–7	7–6	6–6	8–4	—	6–7	7–5
San Francisco	1–7	7–5	3–3	5–8	3–5	3–5	5–8	6–7	8–5	6–6	6–6	7–6	—	7–6
St. Louis	5–7	4–9	5–8	7–5	3–4	4-9	5–7	3–4	4–3	4–5	7–6	5–7	6–7	—

=== Opening Day lineup ===
Opening Day starters
Name	Position
Delino DeShields	Second baseman
José Offerman	Shortstop
Raúl Mondesí	Center fielder
Mike Piazza	Catcher
Eric Karros	First baseman
Henry Rodríguez	Right fielder
Billy Ashley	Left fielder
Dave Hansen	Third baseman
Ramón Martínez	Starting pitcher

=== Notable transactions ===
- April 26, 1995: Casey Candaele was released by the Dodgers.
- May 23, 1995: Acquired Joey Eischen and Roberto Kelly from the Montreal Expos for Henry Rodríguez and Jeff Treadway.
- June 9, 1995: Acquired Kris Foster from the Montreal Expos for Rafael Bournigal.
- June 19, 1995: Acquired Willie Banks from the Chicago Cubs for Dax Winslett.
- July 31, 1995: Acquired Mark Guthrie and Kevin Tapani from the Minnesota Twins for Greg Hansell, José Parra and Ron Coomer.
- August 18, 1995: Acquired Brett Butler from the New York Mets for Scott Hunter and Dwight Maness.

=== Roster ===
1995 Los Angeles Dodgers
Roster
Pitchers: 56 Pedro Astacio; 40 Willie Banks; 45 Jim Bruske; 49 Tom Candiotti; 41 John Cummings; 54 Omar Daal; 51 Joey Eischen; 52 Mark Guthrie; 52 Greg Hansell; 48 Ramón Martínez; 46 Rob Murphy; 16 Hideo Nomo; 13,50 Antonio Osuna; 61 Chan Ho Park; 45,65 José Parra; 50 Félix Rodríguez; 57 Rudy Seánez; 46 Kevin Tapani; 59 Ismael Valdes; 36,66 Todd Williams; 38 Todd Worrell	Catchers: 26 Carlos Hernández; 36,45 Noe Muñoz; 31 Mike Piazza; 15 Tom Prince; Infielders: 25 Mike Busch; 60 Juan Castro; 14 Delino DeShields; 3,22 Chad Fonville; 5 Dave Hansen; 33 Garey Ingram; 23 Eric Karros; 30 José Offerman; 3 Eddie Pye; 22 Dick Schofield; 12 Jeff Treadway; 29 Tim Wallach	Outfielders: 7 Billy Ashley; 12,22 Brett Butler; 27 Roger Cedeño; 12 Karim García; 10 Chris Gwynn; 28 Todd Hollandsworth; 21 Roberto Kelly; 43 Raúl Mondesí; 46 Rick Parker; 40 Henry Rodríguez; 20 Mitch Webster; 41 Reggie Williams	Manager: 2 Tommy Lasorda; Coaches: 8 Joey Amalfitano (third base); 58 Mark Cresse (bullpen); 11 Manny Mota; 18 Bill Russell (bench); 9 Reggie Smith (hitting/1st base); 17 Dave Wallace (pitching)

== Game log ==
=== Regular season ===
Legend
	Dodgers win
	Dodgers loss
	Postponement
	Clinched division
**Bold**	Dodgers team member

1995 regular season game log: 78–66 (Home: 39–33; Away: 39–33)
April: 3–2 (Home: 1–2; Away: 2–0)

#	Date	Time (PT)	Opponent	Score	Win	Loss	Save	Time of Game	Attendance	Record	Box Streak
3	April 28		Braves	**W** 9–1						3–0	W3
4	April 29		Braves	L 3–4						3–1	L1
5	April 30		Braves	L 3–6						3–2	L2

May: 11–17 (Home: 2–8; Away: 9–9)

#	Date	Time (PT)	Opponent	Score	Win	Loss	Save	Time of Game	Attendance	Record	Box Streak

June: 18–10 (Home: 11–7; Away: 7–3)

#	Date	Time (PT)	Opponent	Score	Win	Loss	Save	Time of Game	Attendance	Record	Box Streak
34	June 1		@ Braves	**W** 6–3						15–19	W2

July: 13–13 (Home: 8–6; Away: 5–7)

#	Date	Time (PT)	Opponent	Score	Win	Loss	Save	Time of Game	Attendance	Record	Box Streak
64	July 4		@ Braves	L 2–3						33–31	L2
65	July 5		@ Braves	L 1–4						33–32	L3
66	July 6		@ Braves	L 0–1						33–33	L4
—	July 11	5:29 p.m. PDT	**66th All-Star Game in Arlington, TX**								
67	July 7		@ Reds								
68	July 8		@ Reds								
69	July 9		@ Reds								
83	July 26		Braves	**W** 1–0						42–41	W1
84	July 27		Braves	**W** 9–4						43–41	W2
85	July 28		Reds								
86	July 29		Reds								
87	July 30		Reds								

August: 16–14 (Home: 8–4; Away: 8–10)

#	Date	Time (PT)	Opponent	Score	Win	Loss	Save	Time of Game	Attendance	Record	Box Streak
104	August 17		@ Reds								

September: 16–10 (Home: 9–6; Away: 7–4)

#	Date	Time (PT)	Opponent	Score	Win	Loss	Save	Time of Game	Attendance	Record	Box Streak

October: 1–0 (Home: 0–0; Away: 1–0)

#	Date	Time (PT)	Opponent	Score	Win	Loss	Save	Time of Game	Attendance	Record	Box Streak

=== Detailed records ===
**National League**
Opponent	Home	Away	Total	Pct.	Runs scored	Runs allowed
**NL East**
Atlanta Braves	3–2	1–3	4–5	.444	34	26
	**3–2**	**1–3**	**4–5**	**.444**	**34**	**26**
**NL Central**
Cincinnati Reds	2–1	1–3	3–4	.429	27	29
	**2–1**	**1–3**	**3–4**	**.429**	**27**	**29**
**NL West**
Colorado Rockies	4–3	5–1	9–4	.692	82	77
**Los Angeles Dodgers**	—	—	—	—	—	—
	**4–3**	**5–1**	**9–4**	**.692**	**82**	**77**

=== Postseason Game log ===
Legend
	Dodgers win
	Dodgers loss
**Bold**	Dodgers team member

1995 Postseason game log: 0–3 (Home: 0–2; Away: 0–1)
NL Division Series vs. Cincinnati Reds 0–3 (Home: 0–2; Away: 0–1)

#	Date	Time (PT)	Opponent	Score	Win	Loss	Save	Time of Game	Attendance	Series	Box Streak
1	October 3	5:07 p.m. PDT	Reds								
2	October 4	5:07 p.m. PDT	Reds								
3	October 6	5:07 p.m. PDT	@ Reds								

== Starting Pitchers stats ==
= Indicates league leader

Note: G = Games pitched; GS = Games started; IP = Innings pitched; W/L = Wins/Losses; ERA = Earned run average; BB = Walks allowed; SO = Strikeouts; SV = Saves

Name	G	GS	IP	W/L	ERA	BB	SO	SV
Ramón Martínez	30	30	206.1	17-7	3.66	81	138	4
Ismael Valdez	33	27	197.2	13-11	3.05	51	150	6
Hideo Nomo	28	28	191.1	13-6	2.54	78	236	4
Tom Candiotti	30	30	190.1	7-14	3.50	58	141	1
Kevin Tapani	13	11	57.0	4-2	5.05	14	43	0
Willie Banks	6	6	29.0	0-2	4.03	16	23	0

== Relief Pitchers stats ==
Note: G = Games pitched; GS = Games started; IP = Innings pitched; W/L = Wins/Losses; ERA = Earned run average; BB = Walks allowed; SO = Strikeouts; S = Saves

Name	G	GS	IP	W/L	ERA	BB	SO	SV
Todd Worrell	59	0	62.1	4-1	2.02	19	61	32
Antonio Osuna	39	0	44.2	2-4	4.43	20	46	0
Pedro Astacio	48	11	104.0	7-8	4.24	29	80	0
Rudy Seánez	37	0	34.2	1-3	6.75	18	29	3
John Cummings	35	0	39.0	3-1	3.00	10	21	0
Joey Eischen	17	0	20.1	0-0	3.10	11	15	0
Omar Daal	28	0	20.0	4-0	7.20	15	11	0
Mark Guthrie	24	0	19.2	0-2	3.66	9	19	0
Todd Williams	16	0	19.1	2-2	5.12	7	8	0
Greg Hansell	20	0	19.1	0-1	7.45	6	13	0
Félix Rodríguez	11	0	10.2	1-1	2.53	5	5	0
José Parra	8	0	10.1	0-0	4.35	6	7	0
Jim Bruske	9	0	10.0	0-0	4.50	4	5	1
Rob Murphy	6	0	5.0	0-1	12.60	3	2	0
Chan Ho Park	2	1	4.0	0-0	4.50	2	7	0

== Batting Stats ==
Note: Pos = Position; G = Games played; AB = At bats; Avg. = Batting average; R = Runs scored; H = Hits; HR = Home runs; RBI = Runs batted in; SB = Stolen bases

Name	Pos	G	AB	Avg.	R	H	HR	RBI	SB
Mike Piazza	C	112	434	.346	82	150	32	93	1
Carlos Hernández	C	45	94	.149	3	14	2	8	0
Tom Prince	C	18	40	.200	3	8	1	4	0
Noe Muñoz	C	2	1	.000	0	0	0	0	0
Eric Karros	1B	143	551	.298	83	164	32	105	4
Delino DeShields	2B	127	425	.256	66	109	8	37	39
José Offerman	SS	119	429	.287	69	123	4	33	2
Tim Wallach	3B/1B	97	327	.266	24	87	9	38	0
Chad Fonville	2B/SS/OF	88	308	.276	41	85	0	16	20
Dave Hansen	3B	100	181	.287	19	52	1	14	0
Garey Ingram	2B/3B/OF	44	55	.200	5	11	0	3	3
Mike Busch	3B/1B	13	17	.235	3	4	3	6	0
Jeff Treadway	2B/3B	17	17	.118	2	2	0	3	0
Dick Schofield	3B/SS	9	10	.100	0	1	0	0	0
Eddie Pye	3B	7	8	.000	0	0	0	0	0
Juan Castro	SS/3B	11	4	.250	0	1	0	0	0
Raúl Mondesí	RF	139	536	.285	91	153	26	88	27
Roberto Kelly	CF	112	409	.278	47	114	6	48	15
Billy Ashley	LF	81	215	.237	17	51	8	27	0
Brett Butler	OF	39	146	.274	24	40	0	13	11
Todd Hollandsworth	OF	41	103	.233	16	24	5	13	2
Chris Gwynn	OF	67	84	.214	8	18	1	10	0
Henry Rodríguez	OF	21	80	.263	6	21	1	10	0
Mitch Webster	OF	54	56	.179	6	10	1	3	0
Roger Cedeño	OF	40	42	.238	4	10	0	3	1
Rick Parker	OF	27	29	.276	3	8	0	4	1
Karim García	OF	13	20	.200	1	4	0	0	0
Reggie Williams	OF	15	11	.091	2	1	0	1	0

== 1995 Playoffs ==
=== 1995 National League Division Series ===
The division series was played between the Los Angeles Dodgers and Cincinnati Reds. Cincinnati ended up winning the series 3–0.

==== Game 1, October 3 ====
Dodger Stadium, Los Angeles

Team	1	2	3	4	5	6	7	8	9	R	H	E
Cincinnati	4	0	0	0	3	0	0	0	0	7	12	0
Los Angeles	0	0	0	0	1	1	0	0	0	2	8	0
W: Pete Schourek (1–0) L: Ramón Martínez (0–1)
HRs: CIN – Benito Santiago (1); LAD – Mike Piazza (1)

==== Game 2, October 4 ====
Dodger Stadium, Los Angeles

Team	1	2	3	4	5	6	7	8	9	R	H	E
Cincinnati	0	0	0	2	0	0	0	1	2	5	6	0
Los Angeles	1	0	0	1	0	0	0	0	2	4	14	2
W: Dave Burba (1–0) L: Antonio Osuna (0–1) SV: Jeff Brantley (1)
HRs: CIN – Reggie Sanders (1); LAD – Eric Karros (2)

==== Game 3, October 6 ====
Riverfront Stadium, Cincinnati

Team	1	2	3	4	5	6	7	8	9	R	H	E
Los Angeles	0	0	0	1	0	0	0	0	0	1	9	1
Cincinnati	0	0	2	1	0	4	3	1	X	10	11	2
W: David Wells (1–0) L: Hideo Nomo (0–1)
HRs: CIN – Ron Gant (1), Bret Boone (1), Mark Lewis (1)

== 1995 Awards ==
- 1995 Major League Baseball All-Star Game
  - Mike Piazza starter
  - Hideo Nomo starter
  - Todd Worrell reserve
  - Raúl Mondesí reserve
  - José Offerman reserve
- Rookie of the Year Award
  - Hideo Nomo
- Gold Glove Award
  - Raúl Mondesí
- Baseball Digest Rookie All-Stars
  - Hideo Nomo
- TSN Rookie Pitcher of the Year Award
  - Hideo Nomo
- TSN National League All-Star
  - Eric Karros
  - Mike Piazza
- Silver Slugger Award
  - Eric Karros
  - Mike Piazza
- NL Pitcher of the Month
  - Hideo Nomo (June 1995)
- NL Player of the Month
  - Mike Piazza (August 1995)
- NL Player of the Week
  - Raúl Mondesí (April 25–30)
  - Mike Piazza (May 1–7)
  - Hideo Nomo (June 19–25)
  - Ramón Martínez (July 10–16)
  - Eric Karros (July 24–30)
  - Eric Karros (August 7–13)
  - Mike Piazza (August 21–27)

== Farm system ==
Level	Team	League	Manager
AAA	Albuquerque Dukes	Pacific Coast League	Rick Dempsey
AA	San Antonio Missions	Texas League	John Shelby
**High A**	**San Bernardino Spirit**	**California League**	**Ron Roenicke**
High A	Vero Beach Dodgers	Florida State League	Jon Debus
A-Short Season	Yakima Bears	Northwest League	Joe Vavra
Rookie	Great Falls Dodgers	Pioneer League	John Shoemaker
Rookie	DSL Dodgers; DSL Dodgers 2	Dominican Summer League	

Teams in BOLD won League Championships

== Major League Baseball draft ==
The Dodgers selected 85 players in this draft. Of those, six of them would eventually play Major League baseball.

The first draft pick was left handed pitcher David Yocum out of Florida State University. After an impressive first season with the Vero Beach Dodgers of the Florida State League, Yocum experienced pain in his left shoulder, several surgeries failed to correct the problem and he was out of baseball after just two seasons and 15 games. He later became a firefighter.

1995 draft picks

Round	Name	Position	School	Signed	Career span	Highest level
1	David Yocum	LHP	Florida State University	Yes	1995–1996	A+
2	Darrin Babineaux	RHP	University of Louisiana at Lafayette	Yes	1995–2002	AAA
3	Onan Masaoka	LHP	Waiakea High School	Yes	1995–2009	**MLB**
4	Judd Granzow	OF	Faith Baptist High School	Yes	1995	A-
5	Seferino Soto	RHP	Palomar College	Yes	1995–1998	A
6	Kevin Gibbs	OF	Old Dominion University	Yes	1995–2004	AAA
7	Trent Cuevas	SS	El Dorado High School	Yes	1995–1999	AAA
8	Jon Tucker	1B	Chatsworth High School	Yes	1995–1999	AA
9	Eric Brown	SS	East St. John High School	Yes	1995–2003	A+
10	Mike Carpentier	SS	California State University, Sacramento	Yes	1994–1997	AA
11	Craig Taczy	LHP	Shepard High School	Yes	1995–2003	A+
12	Kenny Miller	SS	Providence Catholic High School	No; Mets-1997	1997–1999	A+
13	Brad Wilkerson	LHP	Apollo High School	No; Expos-1999	1999–2009	**MLB**
14	Spencer Micunek	RHP	Henry Ford Community College	No		
15	J.J. Pearsall	LHP	University of South Carolina	Yes	1995–2002	AAA
16	Eric Flores	SS	Rio Mesa High School	Yes	1995–1997	A
17	Tony Mota	OF	Miami Springs High School	Yes	1996–2006	AAA
18	Jay O'Shaughnessy	RHP	Northeastern University	Yes	1996–1998	A+
19	David Ross	C	Florida High School	No; Dodgers-1998	1998–2016	**MLB**
20	Jeff Rodriguez	C	Coral Gables High School	No; Braves-1999	1999–2001	A+
21	Dennis Mauch	C	Cosumnes River College	Yes	1995	Rookie
22	A. J. Walkanoff	C	Creighton University	Yes	1995–1996	A+
23	Brett Illig	3B	Phoenixville High School	Yes	1995–2001	A+
24	Travis Meyer	C	East Carolina University	Yes	1995–1997	A+
25	Peter Cervantes	RHP	East Los Angeles College	Yes	1995–2005	AAA
26	Peyton Warren	RHP	West Florence High School	No	1999	Ind
27	Mike Sanchez	RHP	Chaffey College	Yes	1995–2002	A+
28	Ken Morimoto	OF	University of Hawaii at Manoa	Yes	1995–1998	A+
29	Greg Clark	C	Paradise Valley High School	No; Cardinals-1998	1998–2001	A+
30	Mitch McNeely	LHP	Centenary College of Louisiana	Yes	1995–1997	A+
31	Pedro Feliciano	LHP	Jose S. Alegria High School	Yes	1995–2014	**MLB**
32	Andy Owen	OF	University of California, Riverside	Yes	1995–2000	A+
33	Laz Gutierrez	LHP	Brito Miami Private School	No; Tigers-1998	1998–2001	A
34	Scott Chambers	LHP	John A. Logan College	Yes	1995–1999	A+
35	Jeff Keppen	RHP	Georgia Southern University	Yes	1995–2003	**KBO**
36	Trevor Bishop	RHP	Assiniboia Composite High School	No		
37	Dave Schmidt	C	Oregon State University	No; Cardinals-1996	1996–1999	AA
38	Terrence McClain	SS	Cumberland University	Yes	1995	A-
39	Chad Roney	C	Jacksonville University	Yes	1996–1997	A+
40	Bobby Cripps	C	Cameron High School	Yes	1996–2000	AA
41	John Davis	RHP	Bethune-Cookman College	Yes	1995–1997	A+
42	Jason Smith	SS	Demopolis High School	No; Cubs-1997	1997–2009	**MLB**
43	Saúl Rivera	SS	Rafael Cordero High School	No		
44	Jeffrey Deno	LHP	Franklin High School	No		
45	Brad Block	RHP	Lake Michigan College	No		
46	Mike Bourbakis	RHP	Franklin D. Roosevelt High School	Yes	1995–1998	A
47	Steve Green	RHP	Polyvalente Edouard Montpetit	No; Angels-1998	1998–2011	**MLB**
48	Xavier Curley	3B	Marshall County High School	No		
49	Andrew Dougherty	C	Glassboro High School	No		
50	Kevin Hodge	SS	Bryan High School	No; Twins-1998	1998–2005	AAA
51	Mark Paschal	OF	Fontana High School	No		
52	Maurice Hightower	LHP	Arlington High School	No		
53	Christian Keating	RHP	Brother Rice High School	No		
54	Cesar Acosta	OF	Yuma High School	No		
55	Brock Rumfield	SS	McLennan Community College	No; Orioles-1998	1998–1999	A+
56	Vance Cozier	RHP	Pickering High School	No; Giants-1999	1999–2003	AA
57	Joel Ainsworth	LHP	Sarnia Collegiate Institute High School	No		
58	Cesar Castaneda	3B	Lincoln High School	No		
59	José Rijo-Berger	OF	Walla Walla Community College	No; Mets-1997	1997	A
60	Chuck Koone	OF	Spartanburg Methodist College	No; Orioles-1998	1998–2001	A+
61	Cash Riley	OF	Trinity Christian Academy High School	Yes	1996–1998	A+
62	Brian Oliver	SS	Antioch High School	No; Angels-1998	1998–2002	AA
63	Chris Vollaro	RHP	Alvin Community College	No		
64	Mark Vallecorsa	LHP	Damien High School	No		
65	Stephen Dupont	RHP	Nicholls State University	No		
66	Gregory Conley	C	Sequim High School	No		
67	Paul Auton	C	Harry Ainlay High School	No		
68	Brian Dawson	RHP	San Bernardino Valley College	No		
69	Tim Hackman	RHP	Vernon High School	No		
70	Brian Wagner	C	Sacramento City College	No	1999–2000	Ind
71	Joseph Thomas	RHP	West Covina High School	No		
72	Tony James	2B	Chaffey College	No; Red Sox-1998	1998–2005	A
73	Ruam Cail	RHP	Kwantlen College	No		
74	Craig Allen	RHP	University of Notre Dame	Yes	1996–1997	A
75	Todd Sutton	OF	Angola High School	No		
76	Neal Atchison	RHP	Central Huron High School	No		
77	Scott Oliver	RHP	Richland Northeast High School	No; Yankees-1999	1999–2000	A
78	Deron Featherstone	RHP	Hendersonville High School	No; Giants-1999	1999–2001	A+
79	Larry Bethea	1B	Red Springs High School	Yes	1995–2008	AAA
80	Brandon Bowe	RHP	San Joaquin Delta College	No; Marlins-1999	1999–2006	AA
81	Michael Tablit	RHP	Yuba Community College	No		
82	C. D. Stover	RHP	American River College	Yes	1996–2002	A+
83	Brad Brewer	SS	Sacramento City College	No; Angels-1997	1997–1998	A
84	Mathew Randel	RHP	Ridgefield High School	No		
85	Ryan Moskau	1B	Sabino High School	No; Dodgers-1998	1998–2001	AA
