= Mimbs =

Mimbs is a surname. Notable people with the surname includes:

- Mike Mimbs (born 1969), American baseball pitcher
- Robert Mimbs (born 1964), Canadian Football League running back
