= Dave Burba =

American baseball player and coach (born 1966)

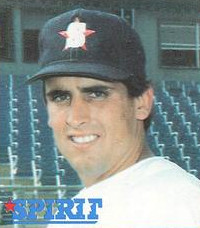
- Burba in 1988
- Pitcher
- Born: July 7, 1966 (age 60); Dayton, Ohio, U.S.
- Batted: Right Threw: Right

MLB debut
- September 8, 1990, for the Seattle Mariners

Last MLB appearance
- September 19, 2004, for the San Francisco Giants

MLB statistics
- Win–loss record: 115–87
- Earned run average: 4.49
- Strikeouts: 1,398
- Stats at Baseball Reference

Teams
- Seattle Mariners (1990–1991); San Francisco Giants (1992–1995); Cincinnati Reds (1995–1997); Cleveland Indians (1998–2001); Texas Rangers (2002); Cleveland Indians (2002); Milwaukee Brewers (2003–2004); San Francisco Giants (2004)

David Allen Burba (born July 7, 1966) is an American former professional baseball pitcher who played for the Seattle Mariners, San Francisco Giants, Cincinnati Reds, Cleveland Indians, Texas Rangers, and Milwaukee Brewers of Major League Baseball (MLB) from 1990 to 2004. In his 15-year MLB career, Burba's record was 115–87, with 1,398 strikeouts, and a 4.49 ERA.

Burba is currently the bullpen coach for the Double-A Midland RockHounds. His uncle was former Brooklyn Dodgers pitcher, Ray Hathaway.

== Playing career ==
Burba attended Kenton Ridge High School in Springfield, Ohio, then the Ohio State University. He was a walk-on to the Ohio State Buckeyes baseball, earning a scholarship his sophomore season. The Seattle Mariners drafted him after his junior year in the second round of the 1987 MLB draft. In the minors, he had elbow surgery in September 1988 then led the Double-A Williamsport Bills in earned run average.

On December 11, 1991, Burba was traded by the Mariners with Mike Jackson and Bill Swift to the San Francisco Giants for Kevin Mitchell, Mike Remlinger, and minor league prospect Joshua Knox. His finest season with San Francisco was in 1993. He was 10–3 and posted a 4.23 ERA.

On July 21, 1995, he was traded by the Giants with Darren Lewis and Mark Portugal to the Cincinnati Reds for Ricky Pickett, John Roper, Deion Sanders, Scott Service, and David McCarty.

In 1996, Burba was 11–13 and posted an ERA of 3.83. He also hit two home runs as a batter. The next year, he went 11–10, but his ERA rose to 4.73. By the 1998 season, his pitching repertoire included the fastball, splitter, slider, curveball, and changeup.

Burba was tabbed as the Reds' opening day starting pitcher in 1998. The day before the season started, however, the Reds traded him to the Cleveland Indians for prospect Sean Casey. Burba went 15–10 in 1998, 15–9 in 1999, and 16–6 in 2000. He battled injuries throughout the 2001 season, and went 10–10 with an ERA of 6.21. That off-season, Burba followed general manager John Hart to the Texas Rangers. He was later placed on waivers and ended up back in Cleveland to finish the season. Burba then signed a deal with the Milwaukee Brewers.

On September 2, 2004, he was traded by Brewers to the Giants for minor leaguer Josh Habel. Burba's final major-league game was on September 19, 2004. After electing free agency on October 29, Burba signed a minor league contract with the Houston Astros on March 29, 2005. He spent the entire season in the minor leagues. He signed a minor league contract with the Mariners on January 27, 2006 but was released on March 24.

== Coaching career ==
Burba became the pitching coach of the Tri-City Dust Devils for the 2011 season, the Class A Short Season affiliate of the Colorado Rockies. He was later the pitching coach for the Modesto Nuts, Hartford Yard Goats, and Lancaster JetHawks in the Rockies farm system. After a stint as pitching coach for the Rockies High-A affiliate Boise Hawks in the Northwest League, Burba moved onto the Arizona Complex League Athletics before getting promoted to the High-A Lansing Lugnuts in 2025. He became the bullpen coach for the Double-A Midland RockHounds in 2026.
