= National League West =

Division of Major League Baseball

- League: National League
- Sport: Major League Baseball
- Founded: 1969
- No. of teams: 5
- Most recent champion: Los Angeles Dodgers (2026; 24th)
- Most titles: Los Angeles Dodgers (24)

National League West Teams Location

The National League West is one of Major League Baseball's six divisions. This division was created for the 1969 season when the National League (NL) expanded to 12 teams by adding the San Diego Padres and the Montreal Expos. For purpose of keeping a regular-season of 162 games, half of the teams were put into the new East Division and half into the new West Division. Within each division, the teams played 18 games each against their five division mates (90 games) and 12 games against the teams in the opposite division (72 games), totaling 162 games. Prior to 1969, the National League had informal, internal divisions strictly for scheduling purposes.

== Geography ==
Despite the geography, the owners of the Chicago Cubs insisted that their team be placed into the East Division along with the teams in New York City, Philadelphia, and Pittsburgh. Also, the owners of the St. Louis Cardinals wanted their team to be in the same division with their natural rivals, the Cubs. The league could have insisted on a purely geographical alignment like the American League did. But the owners were also concerned about what they thought would be a large imbalance in the strength of the divisions. In the previous two seasons prior to realignment, the Cardinals, Giants, and Cubs finished 1-2-3 in the National League standings. The owners were concerned about putting those teams in the same division, thereby creating one very strong division (West) and one weak one (East). Given all of this, the owners of the Atlanta Braves and the Cincinnati Reds consented to being placed into the West Division, even though Atlanta and Cincinnati are both in the Eastern Time Zone. Hence, the West Division had teams spread all the way from the East to the Pacific Coast, and scattered over three time zones (no MLB teams played in the Mountain Time Zone until 1993, when the Colorado Rockies were enfranchised). The East Division was spread over the Eastern Time Zone and the Central Time Zone - despite the fact that the National League had six teams in the Eastern Time Zone and six teams spread between the Central Time Zone and the Pacific Time Zone. The American League had no such issues, as all six of its teams in the Eastern Time Zone played in the AL East, with the remaining six teams playing in the AL West.

All of this increased the traveling distances and times for all of the teams, and it also made radio broadcasting and TV broadcasts of the games more difficult to schedule. The Braves and the Reds had to travel all the way to California three times during each baseball season, and the three teams in California had to travel to Atlanta, Cincinnati, and Houston three times themselves. A makeshift remedy was to add a succeeding or preceding road series in Chicago, St. Louis, or Pittsburgh to longer road trips. The 1994 addition of the Central Division would remedy these problems, when the Reds and Braves moved to the NL Central and NL East, respectively.

== First season ==
The very first baseball season of division play, 1969, resulted in what might be considered by many to be two of the best pennant races in Major League baseball history. In the National League West, five of the teams battled for the divisional championship - with only the expansion team, the San Diego Padres, failing to be a contender. The remaining five teams were separated by as few as one-and-one-half games in the standings on August 18, despite the Houston Astros having lost 20 of its first 24 games.

Beginning in mid-August the Houston Astros and the Los Angeles Dodgers started collapsing, leaving the Braves, the Reds, and the San Francisco Giants in contention. Following a very-long hot streak in July, August, and September, the Braves clinched the divisional championship by winning their next-to-last game. The Giants finished in a close second place. One of the main factors in the big surge by the Braves was that the slugging outfielder Rico Carty returned to the team after missing the first half of the season while he was recovering from tuberculosis. Carty immediately resumed his starring role, adding to the powerful offensive line-up of the Braves that also featured the sluggers Hank Aaron and Orlando Cepeda and the good singles hitter Félix Millán who was on base to score a lot of runs. Aaron finished in third place for the N.L. Most Valuable Player Award, and the starting pitcher Phil Niekro finished in second place for the N.L. Cy Young Award.

Perhaps this latter pennant race was overshadowed by that of the New York Mets and the Chicago Cubs, with the Mets coming back from trailing by nine-and-one-half games near midseason to overtake the Chicago Cubs for the East championship. The sometimes called "Miracle Mets" won the first National League Championship Series over the Braves three games to none, and then the Mets defeated the Baltimore Orioles four games to one in the World Series in October 1969.

== Divisional membership ==
=== Current members ===
- Arizona Diamondbacks – Joined in 1998 as an expansion team
- Colorado Rockies – Joined in 1993 as an expansion team
- Los Angeles Dodgers – Founding member
- San Diego Padres – Founding member
- San Francisco Giants – Founding member

=== Former members ===
- Atlanta Braves – Founding member, moved to the NL East in 1994.
- Cincinnati Reds – Founding member, moved to the NL Central in 1994.
- Houston Astros – Founding member, moved to the NL Central in 1994, then to the AL West in 2013.

=== Membership timeline ===
Place cursor over year for division champ or World Series team.

NL West Division^{[A]}
Years
69	70	71	72	73	74	75	76	77	78	79	80	81	82	83	84	85	86	87	88	89	90	91	92	93	94	95	96	97	98
Atlanta Braves^{[C]}																													
Cincinnati Reds^{[C]}																													
Houston Astros^{[C]}																													
Los Angeles Dodgers
San Diego Padres
San Francisco Giants
																								Colorado Rockies^{[B]}					
																													Arizona; D-backs^{[D]}
NL West Division^{[A]}
Years
99	00	01	02	03	04	05	06	07	08	09	10	11	12	13	14	15	16	17	18	19	20	21	22	23	24	25	26	27	
Los Angeles Dodgers
San Diego Padres
San Francisco Giants
Colorado Rockies
Arizona Diamondbacks
Team not in division Division Won World Series Division Won NL Championship

^{A} The creation of the division with the expansion of the league - with the Padres added.
^{B} With the Rockies added as an expansion team.
^{C} With the Braves moved to East Division and the Reds and the Astros moved to the Central Division
^{D} With the Diamondbacks added as an expansion team.

== Champions by year ==
Before the forming of a third division in both leagues in 1994, the winners of each division competed in a best-of-five series, with the series being lengthened by two possible games in 1985 to a best-of-seven series, dubbed the "League Championship Series" to determine the winner of the league pennant. This format was to be changed in 1994, though it was not carried out until 1995 due to the 1994–95 Major League Baseball strike that started on August 12, 1994. There was the addition of two further teams in the playoffs in each league. This has led to the creation of a "Division Series" round of the playoffs, in which two best-of-five series are conducted to determine the participants of the League Championship Series. As before, the winners of each league's pennant compete in the best-of-seven World Series to determine the champion of Major League Baseball.

- Team names link to the season in which each team played

Year	Winner	Record	%	Playoff Results
1969	Atlanta Braves (1)	93–69	.574	Lost NLCS (Mets) 3–0
1970	Cincinnati Reds (1)	102–60	.630	Won NLCS (Pirates) 3–0; Lost World Series (Orioles) 4–1
1971	San Francisco Giants (1)	90–72	.556	Lost NLCS (Pirates) 3–1
1972	Cincinnati Reds (2)	95–59	.617	Won NLCS (Pirates) 3–2; Lost World Series (Athletics) 4–3
1973	Cincinnati Reds (3)	99–63	.611	Lost NLCS (Mets) 3–2
1974	Los Angeles Dodgers (1)	102–60	.630	Won NLCS (Pirates) 3–1; Lost World Series (Athletics) 4–1
1975	Cincinnati Reds (4)	108–54	.667	Won NLCS (Pirates) 3–0; Won World Series (Red Sox) 4–3
1976	Cincinnati Reds (5)	102–60	.630	Won NLCS (Phillies) 3–0; Won World Series (Yankees) 4–0
1977	Los Angeles Dodgers (2)	98–64	.605	Won NLCS (Phillies) 3–1; Lost World Series (Yankees) 4–2
1978	Los Angeles Dodgers (3)	95–67	.586	Won NLCS (Phillies) 3–1; Lost World Series (Yankees) 4–2
1979	Cincinnati Reds (6)	90–71	.559	Lost NLCS (Pirates) 3–0
1980	Houston Astros (1)*	93–70	.571	Lost NLCS (Phillies) 3–2
1981	Los Angeles Dodgers (4)†	63–47	.573	Won NLDS (Astros) 3–2; Won NLCS (Expos) 3–2; Won World Series (Yankees) 4–2
1982	Atlanta Braves (2)	89–73	.549	Lost NLCS (Cardinals) 3–0
1983	Los Angeles Dodgers (5)	91–71	.562	Lost NLCS (Phillies) 3–1
1984	San Diego Padres (1)	92–70	.568	Won NLCS (Cubs) 3–2; Lost World Series (Tigers) 4–1
1985	Los Angeles Dodgers (6)	95–67	.586	Lost NLCS (Cardinals) 4–2
1986	Houston Astros (2)	96–66	.593	Lost NLCS (Mets) 4–2
1987	San Francisco Giants (2)	90–72	.556	Lost NLCS (Cardinals) 4–3
1988	Los Angeles Dodgers (7)	94–67	.584	Won NLCS (Mets) 4–3; Won World Series (Athletics) 4–1
1989	San Francisco Giants (3)	92–70	.568	Won NLCS (Cubs) 4–1; Lost World Series (Athletics) 4–0
1990	Cincinnati Reds (7)	91–71	.562	Won NLCS (Pirates) 4–2; Won World Series (Athletics) 4–0
1991	Atlanta Braves (3)	94–68	.580	Won NLCS (Pirates) 4–3; Lost World Series (Twins) 4–3
1992	Atlanta Braves (4)	98–64	.605	Won NLCS (Pirates) 4–3; Lost World Series (Blue Jays) 4–2
1993	Atlanta Braves (5)	104–58	.642	Lost NLCS (Phillies) 4–2
1994§	No playoffs due to 1994 Major League Baseball strike			
1995	Los Angeles Dodgers (8)	78–66	.542	Lost NLDS (Reds) 3–0
1996	San Diego Padres (2)	91–71	.562	Lost NLDS (Cardinals) 3–0
1997	San Francisco Giants (4)	90–72	.556	Lost NLDS (Marlins) 3–0
1998	San Diego Padres (3)	98–64	.605	Won NLDS (Astros) 3–1; Won NLCS (Braves) 4–2; Lost World Series (Yankees) 4–0
1999	Arizona Diamondbacks (1)	100–62	.617	Lost NLDS (Mets) 3–1
2000	San Francisco Giants (5)	97–65	.599	Lost NLDS (Mets) 3–1
2001	Arizona Diamondbacks (2)	92–70	.568	Won NLDS (Cardinals) 3–2; Won NLCS (Braves) 4–1; Won World Series (Yankees) 4–3
2002	Arizona Diamondbacks (3)	98–64	.605	Lost NLDS (Cardinals) 3–0
2003	San Francisco Giants (6)	100–61	.621	Lost NLDS (Marlins) 3–1
2004	Los Angeles Dodgers (9)	93–69	.574	Lost NLDS (Cardinals) 3–1
2005	San Diego Padres (4)	82–80	.506	Lost NLDS (Cardinals) 3–0
2006	San Diego Padres (5)††	88–74	.543	Lost NLDS (Cardinals) 3–1
2007	Arizona Diamondbacks (4)	90–72	.556	Won NLDS (Cubs) 3–0; Lost NLCS (Rockies) 4–0
2008	Los Angeles Dodgers (10)	84–78	.519	Won NLDS (Cubs) 3–0; Lost NLCS (Phillies) 4–1
2009	Los Angeles Dodgers (11)	95–67	.586	Won NLDS (Cardinals) 3–0; Lost NLCS (Phillies) 4–1
2010	San Francisco Giants (7)	92–70	.568	Won NLDS (Braves) 3–1; Won NLCS (Phillies) 4–2; Won World Series (Rangers) 4–1
2011	Arizona Diamondbacks (5)	94–68	.580	Lost NLDS (Brewers) 3–2
2012	San Francisco Giants (8)	94–68	.580	Won NLDS (Reds) 3–2; Won NLCS (Cardinals) 4–3; Won World Series (Tigers) 4–0
2013	Los Angeles Dodgers (12)	92–70	.568	Won NLDS (Braves) 3–1; Lost NLCS (Cardinals) 4–2
2014	Los Angeles Dodgers (13)	94–68	.580	Lost NLDS (Cardinals) 3–1
2015	Los Angeles Dodgers (14)	92–70	.568	Lost NLDS (Mets) 3–2
2016	Los Angeles Dodgers (15)	91–71	.562	Won NLDS (Nationals) 3–2; Lost NLCS (Cubs) 4–2
2017	Los Angeles Dodgers (16)	104–58	.642	Won NLDS (Diamondbacks) 3–0; Won NLCS (Cubs) 4–1; Lost World Series (Astros) 4–3
2018	Los Angeles Dodgers (17)**	92–71	.564	Won NLDS (Braves) 3–1; Won NLCS (Brewers) 4–3; Lost World Series (Red Sox) 4–1
2019	Los Angeles Dodgers (18)	106–56	.654	Lost NLDS (Nationals) 3–2
2020	Los Angeles Dodgers (19)†††	43–17	.716	Won NLWC (Brewers) 2–0; Won NLDS (Padres) 3–0; Won NLCS (Braves) 4–3; Won World Series (Rays) 4–2
2021	San Francisco Giants (9)	107–55	.660	Lost NLDS (Dodgers) 3–2
2022	Los Angeles Dodgers (20)	111–51	.685	Lost NLDS (Padres) 3–1
2023	Los Angeles Dodgers (21)	100–62	.617	Lost NLDS (Diamondbacks) 3–0
2024	Los Angeles Dodgers (22)	98–64	.605	Won NLDS (Padres) 3–2; Won NLCS (Mets) 4–2; Won World Series (Yankees) 4–1
2025	Los Angeles Dodgers (23)	93–69	.574	Won NLWC (Reds) 2–0; Won NLDS (Phillies) 3–1; Won NLCS (Brewers) 4–0; Won World Series (Blue Jays) 4–3
2026	Los Angeles Dodgers (24)	100–62	.617	Won NLDS (Braves) 3–1; Lost NLCS (Brewers) 4–0

* – Defeated the Los Angeles Dodgers in a one game playoff for the division title, 7–1.

** – Defeated the Colorado Rockies in a one game playoff for the division title, 5–2.

† – Due to the 1981 Major League Baseball strike, the season was split. Los Angeles won the first half and defeated second-half champion Houston (61–49) in the postseason.
The Cincinnati Reds had the best record in the division (66–42) overall but due to the split season did not qualify for the playoffs.

§ – Due to the players' strike starting August 12, no official winner was awarded. Los Angeles was leading at the strike.

†† – The San Diego Padres and Los Angeles Dodgers finished the 2006 season tied for first place with identical records. San Diego won the season series 13–5 against Los Angeles and was awarded the NL West title; Los Angeles was awarded the wild-card berth. Had a team from another division won the wild card, a one-game playoff would have decided the division champion.

††† – Due to the COVID-19 pandemic, MLB teams played 60 games, with teams play within their division and their respective counterpart (NL West vs. AL West, NL Central vs. AL Central, NL East vs. AL East). By virtue of the eight-team postseason format used for that season, division runner-up San Diego (37–23, .617) also qualified for the playoffs.

== Other postseason teams ==
See List of National League Wild Card winners (since 1994)

The wild card is given to the team in each league with the best record that did not win its division and was first introduced in 1994. The system, however, was not implemented until the following season, as a player strike prematurely ended the 1994 season. Since its implementation, three NL West teams have won the wild card, on six occasions.

Year	Winner	Record	%	GB	Playoff Results
1995	Colorado Rockies	77–67	.535	1	Lost NLDS (Braves) 3–1
1996	Los Angeles Dodgers	90–72	.556	1	Lost NLDS (Braves) 3–0
2002	San Francisco Giants	95–66	.590	2.5	Won NLDS (Braves) 3–2; Won NLCS (Cardinals) 4–1; Lost World Series (Angels) 4–3
2006	Los Angeles Dodgers	88–74	.543	0	Lost NLDS (Mets) 3–0
2007	Colorado Rockies	90–73*	.552	0.5	Won NLDS (Phillies) 3–0; Won NLCS (Diamondbacks) 4–0; Lost World Series (Red Sox) 4–0
2009	Colorado Rockies	92–70	.568	3	Lost NLDS (Phillies) 3–1
2014	San Francisco Giants**	88–74	.543	6	Won NLWC (Pirates); Won NLDS (Nationals) 3–1; Won NLCS (Cardinals) 4–1; Won World Series (Royals) 4–3
2016	San Francisco Giants**	87–75	.537	4	Won NLWC (Mets); Lost NLDS (Cubs) 3–1
2017	Arizona Diamondbacks**	93–69	.574	11	Won NLWC (Rockies); Lost NLDS (Dodgers) 3–0
2017	Colorado Rockies**	87–75	.537	17	Lost NLWC (Diamondbacks)
2018	Colorado Rockies**	91–72	.558	1	Won NLWC (Cubs); Lost NLDS (Brewers) 3–0
2020	San Diego Padres**	37–23	.617	6	Won NLWC (Cardinals) 2–1; Lost NLDS (Dodgers) 3–0
2021	Los Angeles Dodgers**	106–56	.654	1	Won NLWC (Cardinals); Won NLDS (Giants) 3–2; Lost NLCS (Braves) 4–2
2022	San Diego Padres**	89–73	.549	22	Won NLWC (Mets) 2–1; Won NLDS (Dodgers) 3–1; Lost NLCS (Phillies) 4–1
2023	Arizona Diamondbacks**	84–78	.519	16	Won NLWC (Brewers) 2–0; Won NLDS (Dodgers) 3–0; Won NLCS (Phillies) 4–3; Lost World Series (Rangers) 4–1
2024	San Diego Padres**	93–69	.574	5	Won NLWC (Braves) 2–0; Lost NLDS (Dodgers) 3–2
2025	San Diego Padres**	90–72	.556	3	Lost NLWC (Cubs) 2–1
2026	San Diego Padres**	91–71	.562	9	Won NLWC (Cubs) 2–0; Lost NLDS (Brewers) 3–1

* – The Colorado Rockies played the San Diego Padres in a wild card tie-breaker game after both teams finished the season with the same record, 89–73. The Rockies defeated the Padres, 9–8, in 13 innings. A wild card tie-breaker game was still considered part of the regular season, and thus, the Rockies' win made it their 90th victory of the season.

** – From 2012 to 2019, and in 2021, the Wild Card was expanded to two teams. Those teams faced each other in the Wild Card Game to determine the final participant in the National League Division Series. In 2020 only, eight teams, including the three division winners, played in a best-of-three Wild Card Series, with the winners advancing to the Division Series. Starting in 2022, the Wild Card field was increased to three teams, and along with the lowest-ranked division winner, qualified for the best-of-three Wild Card Series to determine the remaining two slots in the Division Series.

== Season results ==
^{(#)}	Denotes team that won the World Series
^{(#)}	Denotes team that won the National League pennant, but lost World Series
^{(#)}	Denotes team that qualified for the MLB postseason

Season	Team (record)						
Season	1st	2nd	3rd	4th	5th	6th	7th
1969: The National League West was formed with six inaugural members: the Atlanta Braves, Cincinnati Reds, Houston Astros, Los Angeles Dodgers, San Diego Padres and San Francisco Giants.
1969	Atlanta (93–69)	San Francisco (90–72)	Cincinnati (89–73)	Los Angeles (85–77)	Houston (81–81)	San Diego (52–110)	
1970	Cincinnati (102–60)	Los Angeles (87–74)	San Francisco (86–76)	Houston (79–83)	Atlanta (76–86)	San Diego (63–99)	
1971	San Francisco (90–72)	Los Angeles (89–73)	Atlanta (82–80)	Cincinnati (79–83)	Houston (79–83)	San Diego (61–100)	
1972	Cincinnati (95–59)	Los Angeles (85–70)	Houston (84–69)	Atlanta (70–84)	San Francisco (69–86)	San Diego (58–95)	
1973	Cincinnati (99–63)	Los Angeles (95–66)	San Francisco (88–74)	Houston (82–80)	Atlanta (76–85)	San Diego (60–102)	
1974	Los Angeles (102–60)	Cincinnati (98–64)	Atlanta (88–74)	Houston (81–81)	San Francisco (72–90)	San Diego (60–102)	
1975	Cincinnati (108–54)	Los Angeles (88–74)	San Francisco (80–81)	San Diego (71–91)	Atlanta (67–94)	Houston (64–97)	
1976	Cincinnati (102–60)	Los Angeles (92–70)	Houston (80–82)	San Francisco (74–88)	San Diego (73–89)	Atlanta (70–92)	
1977	Los Angeles (98–64)	Cincinnati (88–74)	Houston (81–81)	San Francisco (75–87)	San Diego (69–93)	Atlanta (61–101)	
1978	Los Angeles (95–67)	Cincinnati (92–69)	San Francisco (89–73)	San Diego (84–78)	Houston (74–88)	Atlanta (69–93)	
1979	Cincinnati (90–71)	Houston (89–73)	Los Angeles (79–83)	San Francisco (71–91)	San Diego (68–93)	Atlanta (66–94)	
1980	Houston^{[a]} (93–70)	Los Angeles (92–71)	Cincinnati (89–73)	Atlanta (81–80)	San Francisco (75–86)	San Diego (73–89)	
1981: Due to the player's strike, the season was split and a Division Series was created to pit the first and second half champions from each division. The Los Angeles Dodgers won the first half and the Houston Astros won the second half. The Dodgers won the NLDS 3–2 to claim the National League West championship.
1981	Cincinnati (66–42)	Los Angeles (63–47)	Houston (61–49)	San Francisco (56–55)	Atlanta (50–56)	San Diego (41–69)	
1982	Atlanta (89–73)	Los Angeles (88–74)	San Francisco (87–75)	San Diego (81–81)	Houston (77–85)	Cincinnati (61–101)	
1983	Los Angeles (91–71)	Atlanta (88–74)	Houston (85–77)	San Diego (81–81)	San Francisco (79–83)	Cincinnati (74–88)	
1984	San Diego (92–70)	Atlanta (80–82)	Houston (80–82)	Los Angeles (79–83)	Cincinnati (70–92)	San Francisco (66–96)	
1985	Los Angeles (95–67)	Cincinnati (89–72)	Houston (83–79)	San Diego (83–79)	Atlanta (66–96)	San Francisco (62–100)	
1986	Houston (96–66)	Cincinnati (86–76)	San Francisco (83–79)	San Diego (74–88)	Los Angeles (73–89)	Atlanta (72–89)	
1987	San Francisco (90–72)	Cincinnati (84–78)	Houston (76–86)	Los Angeles (73–89)	Atlanta (69–92)	San Diego (65–97)	
1988	Los Angeles (94–67)	Cincinnati (87–74)	San Diego (83–78)	San Francisco (83–79)	Houston (82–80)	Atlanta (54–106)	
1989	San Francisco (92–70)	San Diego (89–73)	Houston (86–76)	Los Angeles (77–83)	Cincinnati (75–87)	Atlanta (63–97)	
1990	Cincinnati (91–71)	Los Angeles (86–76)	San Francisco (85–77)	Houston (75–87)	San Diego (75–87)	Atlanta (65–97)	
1991	Atlanta (94–68)	Los Angeles (93–69)	San Diego (84–78)	San Francisco (75–87)	Cincinnati (74–88)	Houston (65–97)	
1992	Atlanta (98–64)	Cincinnati (90–72)	San Diego (82–80)	Houston (81–81)	San Francisco (72–90)	Los Angeles (63–99)	
1993: An expansion team, Colorado Rockies, joined the division.
1993	Atlanta (104–58)	San Francisco (103–59)	Houston (85–77)	Los Angeles (81–81)	Cincinnati (73–89)	Colorado (67–95)	San Diego (61–101)
1994: The Cincinnati Reds and Houston Astros left to join the National League Central. The Atlanta Braves left to join the National League East. Due to the player's strike, the remainder of the season was cancelled on August 12. The postseason and World Series was also cancelled.
1994	Los Angeles (58–56)	San Francisco (55–60)	Colorado (53–64)	San Diego (47–70)			
1995	^{(3)} Los Angeles (78–66)	^{(4)} Colorado (77–67)	San Diego (70–74)	San Francisco (67–77)			
1996	^{(2)} San Diego (91–71)	^{(4)} Los Angeles (90–72)	Colorado (83–79)	San Francisco (68–94)			
1997	^{(2)} San Francisco (90–72)	Los Angeles (88–74)	Colorado (83–79)	San Diego (76–86)			
1998: An expansion team, Arizona Diamondbacks, joined the division.
1998	^{(3)} San Diego (98–64)	San Francisco^{[b]} (89–74)	Los Angeles (83–79)	Colorado (77–85)	Arizona (65–97)		
1999	^{(2)} Arizona (100–62)	San Francisco (86–76)	Los Angeles (77–85)	San Diego (74–88)	Colorado (72–90)		
2000	^{(1)} San Francisco (97–65)	Los Angeles (86–76)	Arizona (85–77)	Colorado (82–80)	San Diego (76–86)		
2001	^{(2)} Arizona (92–70)	San Francisco (90–72)	Los Angeles (86–76)	San Diego (79–83)	Colorado (73–89)		
2002	^{(2)} Arizona (98–64)	^{(4)} San Francisco (95–66)	Los Angeles (92–70)	Colorado (73–89)	San Diego (66–96)		
2003	^{(2)} San Francisco (100–61)	Los Angeles (85–77)	Arizona (84–78)	Colorado (74–88)	San Diego (64–98)		
2004	^{(3)} Los Angeles (93–69)	San Francisco (91–71)	San Diego (87–75)	Colorado (68–94)	Arizona (51–111)		
2005	^{(3)} San Diego (82–80)	Arizona (77–85)	San Francisco (75–87)	L.A. Dodgers (71–91)	Colorado (67–95)		
2006	^{(2)} San Diego^{[c]} (88–74)	^{(4)} Los Angeles (88–74)	San Francisco (76–85)	Arizona (76–86)	Colorado (76–86)		
2007	^{(1)} Arizona (90–72)	^{(4)} Colorado^{[d]} (90–73)	San Diego (89–74)	L.A. Dodgers (82–80)	San Francisco (71–91)		
2008	^{(3)} Los Angeles (84–78)	Arizona (82–80)	Colorado (74–88)	San Francisco (72–90)	San Diego (63–99)		
2009	^{(1)} Los Angeles (95–67)	^{(4)} Colorado (92–70)	San Francisco (88–74)	San Diego (75–87)	Arizona (70–92)		
2010	^{(2)} San Francisco (92–70)	San Diego (90–72)	Colorado (83–79)	L.A. Dodgers (80–82)	Arizona (65–97)		
2011	^{(3)} Arizona (94–68)	San Francisco (86–76)	L.A. Dodgers (82–79)	Colorado (73–89)	San Diego (71–91)		
2012	^{(3)} San Francisco (94–68)	L.A. Dodgers (86–76)	Arizona (81–81)	San Diego (76–86)	Colorado (64–98)		
2013	^{(3)} Los Angeles (92–70)	Arizona (81–81)	San Diego (76–86)	San Francisco (76–86)	Colorado (74–88)		
2014	^{(2)} Los Angeles (94–68)	^{(5)} San Francisco^{[e]} (88–74)	San Diego (77–85)	Colorado (66–96)	Arizona (64–98)		
2015	^{(2)} Los Angeles (92–70)	San Francisco (84–78)	Arizona (79–83)	San Diego (74–88)	Colorado (68–94)		
2016	^{(3)} Los Angeles (91–71)	^{(5)} San Francisco^{[f]} (87–75)	Colorado (75–87)	Arizona (69–93)	San Diego (68–94)		
2017	^{(1)} Los Angeles (104–58)	^{(4)} Arizona (93–69)	^{(5)} Colorado (87–75)	San Diego (71–91)	San Francisco (64–98)		
2018	^{(2)} Los Angeles^{[g]} (92–71)	^{(5)} Colorado (91–72)	Arizona (82–80)	San Francisco (73–89)	San Diego (66–96)		
2019	^{(1)} Los Angeles (106–56)	Arizona (85–77)	San Francisco (77–85)	Colorado (71–91)	San Diego (70–92)		
2020: Due to the COVID-19 pandemic, the season was shortened to 60 games. The postseason field was expanded to eight teams and the wild-card round became a best-of-three series.
2020	^{(1)} Los Angeles (43–17)	^{(4)} San Diego (37–23)	San Francisco^{[h]} (29–31)	Colorado (26–34)	Arizona (25–35)		
2021	^{(1)} San Francisco (107–55)	^{(4)} L.A. Dodgers (106–56)	San Diego (79–83)	Colorado (74–87)	Arizona (52–110)		
2022	^{(1)} Los Angeles (111–51)	^{(5)} San Diego (89–73)	San Francisco (81–81)	Arizona (74–88)	Colorado (68–94)		
2023	^{(2)} Los Angeles (100–62)	^{(6)} Arizona^{[i]} (84–78)	San Diego (82–80)	San Francisco (79–83)	Colorado (59–103)		
2024	^{(1)} Los Angeles (98–64)	^{(4)} San Diego (93–69)	Arizona^{[j]} (89–73)	San Francisco (80–82)	Colorado (61–101)		
2025	^{(3)} Los Angeles (93–69)	^{(5)} San Diego (90–72)	San Francisco (81–81)	Arizona (80–82)	Colorado (43–119)		
2026	^{(2)} Los Angeles (100–62)	^{(4)} San Diego (91–71)	Arizona (86–76)	San Francisco (65–97)	Colorado (58–104)		

Notes and tiebreakers

- ^{a} Houston and Los Angeles were tied for the division championship and played in a tie-breaker game. The Astros won 7–1 to claim the division crown.
- ^{b} San Francisco and Chicago of the National League Central were tied for the wild-card berth and played in a tie-breaker game. The Giants lost 5–3 and were eliminated from postseason contention.
- ^{c} San Diego and Los Angeles were tied for the division championship and wild-card berth, but the Padres claimed the division crown by winning the season series 13–5, relegating the Dodgers to the wild-card spot.
- ^{d} Colorado and San Diego were tied for the wild-card berth and played in a tie-breaker game. The Rockies won 9–8 in 13 innings to claim the wild-card spot.
- ^{e} San Francisco and Pittsburgh of the National League Central were tied for both wild-card berths, but the Giants were relegated to the second wild-card spot by losing the season series 4–2.
- ^{f} San Francisco and New York of the National League East were tied for both wild-card berths, but the Giants were relegated to the second wild-card spot by losing the season series 4–3.
- ^{g} Los Angeles and Colorado were tied for the division championship and second wild-card berth and played in a tie-breaker game. The Dodgers won 5–2 to claim the division crown, while the Rockies were relegated to the second wild-card spot.
- ^{h} San Francisco and Milwaukee of the National League Central were tied for the second wild-card berth, but the Giants were eliminated from postseason contention due to an inferior intra-division record (Milwaukee had a 19–21 record while San Francisco had an 18–22 record).
- ^{i} Arizona and Miami of the National League East were tied for the fifth seed and the second wild-card berth, but the Diamondbacks were relegated to the third wild-card spot by losing the season series 4–2.
- ^{j} Arizona, Atlanta and New York of the National League East were tied for the fifth seed and the second wild-card berth, but the Diamondbacks were eliminated from the postseason by losing the season series 5–2 with the Braves, and 4–3 with the Mets.

== NL West statistics ==
Team	Division championships			Postseason records (Note: Reflects postseason record of each team only during the team's time as a member of the NL West)				
Team	Number	Year(s)	Most recent	Wild Card (Note: Number of times qualifying as a wild card team)	NLWC	NLDs	NLCS	World Series
Current teams in division
Los Angeles Dodgers	24	1974, 1977–1978, 1981, 1983, 1985, 1988, 1995, 2004, 2008–2009, 2013–2017, 2018*, 2019–2020, 2022–2026	2026	3	3–0	10–9	10–7	5–5
San Francisco Giants	9	1971, 1987, 1989, 1997, 2000, 2003, 2010, 2012, 2021	2021	3	2–0	4–5	5–2	3–2
San Diego Padres	5	1984, 1996, 1998, 2005–2006	2006	4	3–1	2–5	2–1	0–2
Arizona Diamondbacks	5	1999, 2001–2002, 2007, 2011	2011	2	2–0	3–4	2–1	1–1
Colorado Rockies	0	—	—	5	1–1	1–3	1–0	0–1
Former teams in division
Cincinnati Reds^{†}	7	1970, 1972–1973, 1975–1976, 1979, 1990	1990	—	—	0–0	5–2	3–2
Atlanta Braves^{†}	5	1969, 1982, 1991–1993	1993	—	—	0–0	2–3	0–2
Houston Astros§	2	1980*, 1986	1986	—	—	0–1	0–2	0–0
Total	56	1969–1993, 1995–present	2025	12	5‍–‍5	18‍–‍20	19‍–‍24	11‍–‍7

* – Won division via tiebreaker
† indicates no longer in division since 1994
§ indicates no longer in division since 1994, and no longer part of NL since 2013

Totals updated through conclusion of the 2024 postseason.

== Rivalries ==
- Diamondbacks–Dodgers rivalry
- Dodgers–Giants rivalry
- Dodgers–Padres rivalry

== See also ==
- National League East
- National League Central
- American League East
- American League Central
- American League West
