= John Courtright =

American baseball player (born 1970)

- Pitcher
- Born: May 30, 1970 (age 56); Marion, Ohio, U.S.
- Batted: Left Threw: Left

MLB debut
- May 6, 1995, for the Cincinnati Reds

Last MLB appearance
- May 6, 1995, for the Cincinnati Reds

MLB statistics
- Innings pitched: 1
- Earned run average: 9.00
- Strikeouts: 0
- Stats at Baseball Reference

Teams
- Cincinnati Reds (1995)

John Charles Courtright (born May 30, 1970) is an American former Major League Baseball (MLB) pitcher who played for the Cincinnati Reds.

Courtright graduated from Marion Harding High School in Marion, Ohio, played college baseball at Duke and was selected in the eighth round of the 1991 Major League Baseball draft by the Reds.

In April 1994, while pitching for the Chattanooga Lookouts, Courtright was the first pitcher to face Birmingham Barons outfielder Michael Jordan in a regular season game. He struck Jordan out twice but asked for his autograph on the following day.

On May 6, 1995, he and Scott Sullivan were promoted to Cincinnati's Major League roster to replace Willie Greene and Johnny Ruffin. He made his debut on the same day at the age of 25 at Riverfront Stadium against the New York Mets. In the eighth inning, manager Davey Johnson double-switched him and Jerome Walton into the game for Deion Sanders and Scott Sullivan respectively. He pitched one inning and gave up one earned run and never pitched in the big leagues again.

A month after his Major League debut, he was traded to the Minnesota Twins for David McCarty.

Courtright served as an agent after retiring, representing such players as Zack Greinke, Jon Lester, Patrick Corbin, J. A. Happ, Clay Buchholz, Adam Lind, B.J. Ryan, Glen Perkins and Austin Kearns. He also represented manager John Farrell and former Reds teammate Scott Sullivan.
