= Garey Ingram =

American baseball player (born 1970)

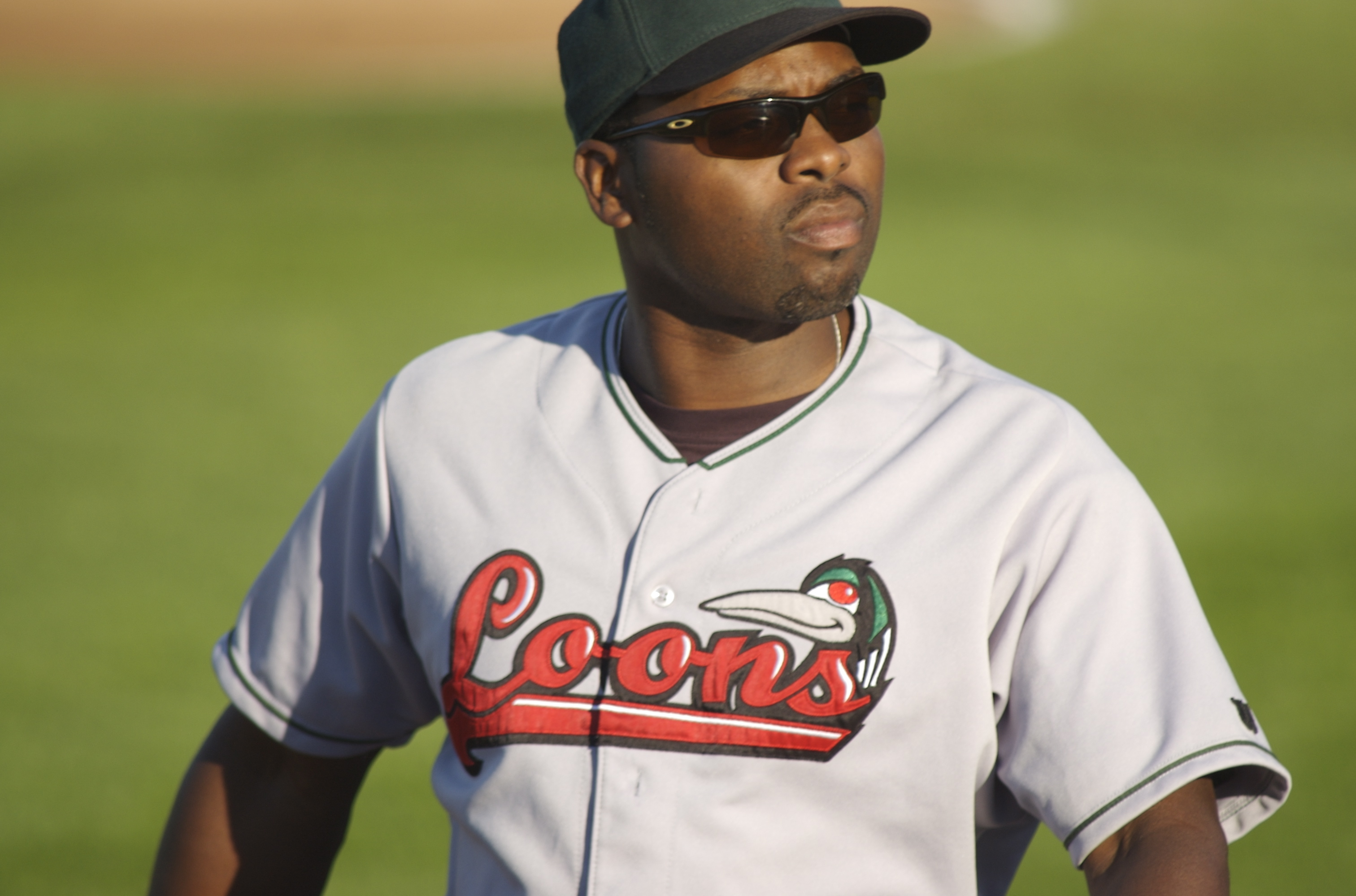
- Second baseman
- Born: July 25, 1970 (age 56); Columbus, Georgia, U.S.
- Batted: Right Threw: Right

MLB debut
- May 15, 1994, for the Los Angeles Dodgers

Last MLB appearance
- September 28, 1997, for the Los Angeles Dodgers

MLB statistics
- Batting average: .261
- Home runs: 3
- Runs batted in: 12
- Stats at Baseball Reference

Teams
- Los Angeles Dodgers (1994–1995, 1997)

Garey Lamar Ingram (born July 25, 1970, in Columbus, Georgia) is an American former professional baseball infielder. He played in Major League Baseball (MLB) for the Los Angeles Dodgers.

== Career ==
Drafted by the Los Angeles Dodgers in the 44th round of the 1989 MLB amateur draft out of Middle Georgia College, Ingram spent many years in the Dodgers minor league system. He made his professional debut with the Bakersfield Dodgers in 1991, hitting .297 with 30 stolen bases during the 1991 season. From 1992 through 1994 he played with the Dodgers Double-A franchise in San Antonio.

Ingram made his Major League Baseball debut with the Los Angeles Dodgers on May 15, 1994, as a defensive replacement against the San Diego Padres. However, his first career at-bat did not come until May 19, when, as a pinch hitter, he hit a home run against Colorado Rockies pitcher Mike Munoz. He appeared in 26 games for the Dodgers that season, hitting .282 with 3 home runs and 8 RBIs.

He split the 1995 season between the Dodgers and AAA Albuquerque. Ingram missed most of the 1996 season due to an injury and then spent 1997 with San Antonio and 1998 with Albuquerque before being picked up by the Boston Red Sox as a minor league free agent in 1999. He spent two seasons with the Pawtucket Red Sox before he was released. Played independent ball in 2001 and then spent 2002 with the Dodgers new AAA team, the Las Vegas 51s before retiring from baseball.

After his retirement, he became a hitting coach in the Dodgers farm system. First with the GCL Dodgers in 2002 and then with the South Georgia Waves and Columbus Catfish from 2003 to 2006. In 2007 and 2008 he was the hitting coach for the Great Lakes Loons in Single-A. During the 2009 season, he was the hitting coach for the Connecticut Defenders. After the completion of the season, Ingram was hired by the Atlanta Braves to serve in the same position for their AA Mississippi Braves.

== Post-baseball hobbies ==
As an avid crappie fisherman, Garey began documenting his fishing outings in North Carolina, filming at different city lakes in the state. He shares his experiences through the YouTube channel named Cove Ultimate Fishing, where he posts videos of his fishing activities.
