= Joe Rosselli =

American baseball player (born 1972)

- Pitcher
- Born: May 28, 1972 (age 53); Burbank, California
- Batted: Right Threw: Left

MLB debut
- April 30, 1995, for the San Francisco Giants

Last MLB appearance
- October 1, 1995, for the San Francisco Giants

MLB statistics
- Win–loss record: 2–1
- Earned run average: 8.70
- Strikeouts: 7
- Stats at Baseball Reference

Teams
- San Francisco Giants (1995)

Joseph Donald Rosselli (born May 28, 1972) is a former Major League Baseball pitcher for the San Francisco Giants. His record was 2–1 with an 8.70 ERA in nine appearances, five of them starts. He walked 20 batters while striking out just seven.
