= Paul Fletcher (baseball) =

American baseball player (born 1967)

Lexington Legends
- Pitcher / Coach
- Born: January 14, 1967 (age 59); Gallipolis, Ohio
- Batted: Right Threw: Right

MLB debut
- July 11, 1993, for the Philadelphia Phillies

Last MLB appearance
- August 16, 1996, for the Oakland Athletics

MLB statistics
- Win–loss record: 1–0
- Strikeouts: 10
- Earned run average: 6.60
- Stats at Baseball Reference

Teams
- Philadelphia Phillies (1993, 1995); Oakland Athletics (1996)

Edward Paul Fletcher (born January 14, 1967) is an American former professional baseball pitcher. He played in Major League Baseball (MLB) for the Philadelphia Phillies (1993, 1995) and Oakland Athletics (1996).

As of May 2022, he works as a Community Relations Manager for Retreat Behavioral Health, but previously was a Business Development Representative for The Treatment Center of the Palm Beaches, in Palm Beach, Florida. In November 2024, he was named field manager for the Lexington Legends minor league professional baseball team located in Lexington, Kentucky.

== Amateur career ==
Paul Fletcher attended Ravenswood High School in Ravenswood, West Virginia, where he was an all-state athlete in baseball and football and a second team all-star in basketball. He played baseball for the USC Aiken Pacers for the 1986 and 1987 seasons.
