= Eddie Pye =

American baseball player (born 1967)

- Infielder
- Born: February 13, 1967 (age 59); Columbia, Tennessee, U.S.
- Batted: Right Threw: Right

MLB debut
- June 3, 1994, for the Los Angeles Dodgers

Last MLB appearance
- May 19, 1995, for the Los Angeles Dodgers

MLB statistics
- Batting average: .056
- Home runs: 0
- Runs batted in: 0
- Stats at Baseball Reference

Teams
- Los Angeles Dodgers (1994–1995)

Robert Edward Pye (born February 13, 1967) is an American former Major League Baseball infielder. He is an alumnus of Middle Tennessee State University.

Drafted by the Los Angeles Dodgers in the 10th round of the 1988 MLB amateur draft, Pye made his Major League Baseball debut with the Los Angeles Dodgers on June 3, 1994, and appeared in his final game on May 19, 1995.
