= Toby Borland =

American baseball player (born 1969)

- Pitcher
- Born: May 29, 1969 (age 55); Ruston, Louisiana, U.S.
- Batted: Right Threw: Right

MLB debut
- May 27, 1994, for the Philadelphia Phillies

Last MLB appearance
- June 24, 2004, for the Florida Marlins

MLB statistics
- Win–loss record: 11–9
- Earned run average: 4.17
- Strikeouts: 211
- Stats at Baseball Reference

Teams
- Philadelphia Phillies (1994–1996); New York Mets (1997); Boston Red Sox (1997); Philadelphia Phillies (1998); Anaheim Angels (2001); Florida Marlins (2002–2004)

Toby Shawn Borland (born May 29, 1969) is an American former professional baseball relief pitcher, who played in Major League Baseball (MLB) between 1994 and 2004 for the Philadelphia Phillies (1994-1996, 1998), New York Mets (1997), Boston Red Sox (1997), Anaheim Angels (2001), and Florida Marlins (2002). He batted and threw right-handed.

Borland was a 16-year veteran, who divided his playing time between MLB and minor leagues. He was 24 years old when he reached the majors in 1994 with the Philadelphia Phillies, spending three seasons with them before moving to the Mets (1997) and Red Sox (1997). After a new stint with Philadelphia (1998), he worked with the Angels (2001) and Marlins (2002). His most productive season came in 1996 for the Phillies, when he had a 7–3 mark while recording career-highs in games pitched (69), innings (90 2/3) and strikeouts (76). He was the last Phillies player to wear the uniform number 42 before it was retired out of respect to Jackie Robinson.

In a nine-season major league career, Borland posted an 11–9 record with a 4.17 ERA and eight saves in 207 appearances. From 1988 to 2005, in the minors, he had a 56–45 mark with a 3.35 ERA and 124 saves in 623 games.
