= Matt Grott =

American baseball player (born 1967)

- Pitcher
- Born: December 5, 1967 (age 58); La Porte, Indiana, U.S.
- Batted: Left Threw: Left

MLB debut
- May 4, 1995, for the Cincinnati Reds

Last MLB appearance
- May 6, 1995, for the Cincinnati Reds

MLB statistics
- Games pitched: 2
- Earned run average: 21.60
- Strikeouts: 2
- Stats at Baseball Reference

Teams
- Cincinnati Reds (1995)

Matthew Allen Grott (born December 5, 1967) is an American former Major League Baseball pitcher who played for the Cincinnati Reds in 1995.

Grott was born in Indiana but attended Apollo High School in Glendale, Arizona and Phoenix College. He went undrafted and signed in 1989 with the Oakland Athletics.

After his professional career, he coached baseball at Pinnacle High School in Phoenix.
