= Johnny Ruffin =

American baseball player (born 1971)

- Pitcher
- Born: July 29, 1971 (age 54); Butler, Alabama, U.S.
- Batted: Right Threw: Right

Professional debut
- MLB: August 8, 1993, for the Cincinnati Reds
- NPB: May 13, 1997, for the Kintetsu Buffaloes
- KBO: April 7, 2002, for the SK Wyverns

Last appearance
- NPB: May 13, 1997, for the Kintetsu Buffaloes
- MLB: August 2, 2001, for the Florida Marlins
- KBO: May 14, 2002, for the SK Wyverns

MLB statistics
- Win–loss record: 10–6
- Earned run average: 4.13
- Strikeouts: 163

NPB statistics
- Win–loss record: 0–0
- Earned run average: 5.40
- Strikeouts: 2

KBO statistics
- Win–loss record: 1–0
- Earned run average: 2.60
- Strikeouts: 18
- Stats at Baseball Reference

Teams
- Cincinnati Reds (1993–1996); Kintetsu Buffaloes (1997); Arizona Diamondbacks (2000); Florida Marlins (2001); SK Wyverns (2002)

Johnny Renando Ruffin (born July 29, 1971) is an American former professional baseball pitcher. He played six seasons in Major League Baseball (MLB) for the Cincinnati Reds, Arizona Diamondbacks and Florida Marlins. He also played one season in Nippon Professional Baseball (NPB) with the Kintetsu Buffaloes and one season in the KBO League for the SK Wyverns.

== Career ==
Ruffin was drafted by the Chicago White Sox in the 4th round of the 1988 MLB draft. He played his first professional season with their rookie club Gulf Coast League White Sox in 1988. He played in MLB with the Cincinnati Reds from 1993 to 1996, then spent a season in Japan with the Kintetsu Buffaloes. (He returned to MLB with the Arizona Diamondbacks (2000) and Florida Marlins (2001). He played his last affiliated season for Cincinnati's Triple-A Louisville Bats in 2002 and appeared in Korea with the SK Wyverns that same season. His last professional season was with the independent Pennsylvania Road Warriors of the Atlantic League in 2004.

A 2016 AL.com article named Ruffin the best athlete to come from Choctaw County, Alabama.
