= Mike Mimbs =

American baseball player (born 1969)

- Pitcher
- Born: February 13, 1969 (age 56); Macon, Georgia, U.S.
- Batted: Left Threw: Left

MLB debut
- May 6, 1995, for the Philadelphia Phillies

Last MLB appearance
- May 16, 1997, for the Philadelphia Phillies

MLB statistics
- Win–loss record: 12–19
- Earned run average: 5.03
- Strikeouts: 178

CPBL statistics
- Win–loss record: 1–3
- Earned run average: 4.00
- Strikeouts: 27
- Stats at Baseball Reference

Teams
- Philadelphia Phillies (1995–1997); Sinon Bulls (1999)

Michael Randall Mimbs (born February 13, 1969) is an American former professional baseball pitcher, who played in Major League Baseball (MLB) for the Philadelphia Phillies, from 1995 to 1997. He threw and batted left-handed. During his playing days, Mimbs stood 6 feet 2 inches (1.88 m) tall, weighing 182 pounds (83 kg).

Mimbs attended Mercer University, where he played college baseball for the Bears, under head coach Barry Myers.

Mimbs' identical twin brother, Mark, was also a professional baseball pitcher. Both twins were drafted by the Los Angeles Dodgers in 1990. The twins were teammates at Windsor Academy, Mercer and in the lower levels of the Dodgers farm system.
