= John Roper (baseball) =

American baseball player (born 1971)

- Starting Pitcher
- Born: November 21, 1971 (age 54); Raeford, North Carolina, U.S.
- Batted: Right Threw: Right

MLB debut
- May 16, 1993, for the Cincinnati Reds

Last MLB appearance
- September 11, 1995, for the San Francisco Giants

MLB statistics
- Win–loss record: 8–7
- Earned run average: 5.35
- Strikeouts: 111
- Stats at Baseball Reference

Teams
- Cincinnati Reds (1993–1995); San Francisco Giants (1995)

John Christopher Roper (born November 21, 1971) is an American former Major League Baseball pitcher. He played in parts of three seasons in the majors, from 1993 until 1995, for the Cincinnati Reds and San Francisco Giants. Roper was drafted in the 12th round of the 1990 MLB draft out of Hoke County High School in Raeford, North Carolina.

== Sources ==
- Career statistics from Baseball Reference · Baseball Reference (Minors) · Retrosheet · Baseball Almanac
