= Mark Portugal =

American baseball player (born 1962)

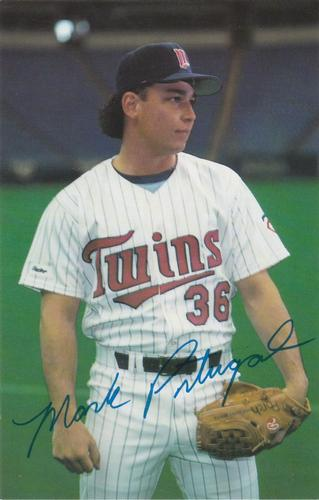
- Portugal in 1987
- Pitcher
- Born: October 30, 1962 (age 63); Los Angeles, California, U.S.
- Batted: Right Threw: Right

MLB debut
- August 14, 1985, for the Minnesota Twins

Last MLB appearance
- September 22, 1999, for the Boston Red Sox

MLB statistics
- Win–loss record: 109–95
- Earned run average: 4.03
- Strikeouts: 1,134
- Stats at Baseball Reference

Teams
- Minnesota Twins (1985–1988); Houston Astros (1989–1993); San Francisco Giants (1994–1995); Cincinnati Reds (1995–1996); Philadelphia Phillies (1997–1998); Boston Red Sox (1999)

Career highlights and awards
- Silver Slugger Award (1994)

Mark Steven Portugal (born October 30, 1962) is an American former Major League Baseball pitcher who played in the major leagues from 1985 to 1999.

== Career ==
Portugal attended Norwalk High School in Norwalk, California. He was signed by the Minnesota Twins in 1980. In 1984, he went 14–7 for the Orlando Twins of the Southern League and made his major league debut the following season.

Portugal spent the rest of the decade in either AAA or the majors. In 1988, he was traded to the Houston Astros. In 1989, he went 7–1 with a 2.75 earned run average for them and won a spot in the starting rotation. He had his best season in 1993, when he won 18 games, led the National League in winning percentage, and finished sixth in the Cy Young Award voting.

Portugal signed with the San Francisco Giants as a free agent in 1994. Typically a .200 hitter, he led all regular starting pitchers with a .354 batting average in 1994 and won the Silver Slugger Award. The following season, he was traded to the Cincinnati Reds. Portugal played for several teams over the next few years and retired in 2000.

== See also ==
- List of Silver Slugger Award winners at pitcher
