= Scott Service =

American baseball player (born 1967)

- Pitcher
- Born: February 26, 1967 (age 59); Cincinnati, Ohio, U.S.
- Batted: Right Threw: Right

MLB debut
- September 5, 1988, for the Philadelphia Phillies

Last MLB appearance
- September 26, 2004, for the Arizona Diamondbacks

MLB statistics
- Win–loss record: 20–22
- Earned run average: 4.99
- Strikeouts: 413
- Stats at Baseball Reference

Teams
- Philadelphia Phillies (1988); Chunichi Dragons (1991); Montreal Expos (1992); Colorado Rockies (1993); Cincinnati Reds (1993–1994); San Francisco Giants (1995); Cincinnati Reds (1996–1997); Kansas City Royals (1997–1999); Oakland Athletics (2000); Arizona Diamondbacks (2003); Toronto Blue Jays (2003); Arizona Diamondbacks (2004)

Scott David Service (born February 26, 1967) is an American former professional baseball pitcher who played for several Major League Baseball teams, between 1988 and 2004. He also pitched one season in Japan, for the Chunichi Dragons in 1991.

== Baseball career ==
Service attended Aiken High School and was signed as an undrafted free agent by the Philadelphia Phillies in 1985, making his major league debut as a September callup in 1988, with five relief appearances.

Service pitched in the Phillies' minor league system the next two seasons before being granted free agency and signing with the Montreal Expos and pitching for the Expos' AAA affiliate in Indianapolis for 1991. During 1991, he made one pitching appearance for the Chunichi Dragons of the Japanese League, after being purchased by them on July 19.

Service again signed with the Expos as a free agent in the offseason, then was granted free agency on June 8, 1992, signing with the Cincinnati Reds the following day. He spent the remainder of the 1992 season, as well as the early portion of 1993, in the Reds' farm system before being waived in June. On June 28, Service was signed by the Colorado Rockies, for whom he made three appearances before again being placed on waivers. He was then again claimed by the Reds.
