= Ricky Pickett =

American baseball player (born 1970)

- Pitcher
- Born: January 19, 1970 (age 56); Fort Worth, Texas, U.S.
- Batted: Left Threw: Left

MLB debut
- April 28, 1998, for the Arizona Diamondbacks

Last MLB appearance
- May 5, 1998, for the Arizona Diamondbacks

MLB statistics
- Win–loss record: 0–0
- Earned run average: 81.00
- Strikeouts: 2
- Stats at Baseball Reference

Teams
- Arizona Diamondbacks (1998)

Cecil Lee Pickett (born January 19, 1970) is an American former Major League Baseball left-handed pitcher.

Drafted by the Cincinnati Reds in the 28th round of the 1992 MLB amateur draft, Pickett made his Major League Baseball debut with the Arizona Diamondbacks on April 28, 1998, and appeared in his final game on May 5, 1998.

Pickett was a member of the inaugural Arizona Diamondbacks team that began play in Major League Baseball in 1998.

== Sources ==
- Career statistics from Baseball Reference · Baseball Reference (Minors) · Retrosheet · Baseball Almanac
