= Darren Lewis =

American baseball player (born 1967)

- Center fielder
- Born: August 28, 1967 (age 59); Berkeley, California, U.S.
- Batted: Right Threw: Right

MLB debut
- August 21, 1990, for the Oakland Athletics

Last MLB appearance
- July 30, 2002, for the Chicago Cubs

MLB statistics
- Batting average: .250
- Home runs: 27
- Runs batted in: 342
- Stolen bases: 247
- Stats at Baseball Reference

Teams
- Oakland Athletics (1990); San Francisco Giants (1991–1995); Cincinnati Reds (1995); Chicago White Sox (1996–1997); Los Angeles Dodgers (1997); Boston Red Sox (1998–2001); Chicago Cubs (2002)

Career highlights and awards
- Gold Glove Award (1994)

Darren Joel Lewis (born August 28, 1967) is an American former professional baseball player who played center field in Major League Baseball (MLB) for the Oakland Athletics (1990), San Francisco Giants (1991–1995), Cincinnati Reds (1995), Chicago White Sox (1996–1997), Los Angeles Dodgers (1997) and Boston Red Sox (1998–2001); he played his final season in 2002 with the Chicago Cubs. He was traded to the Pittsburgh Pirates on July 31, 2002, but refused to report to the Pirates, choosing to retire instead.

He is best remembered for his seasons with the Giants and Red Sox. Dusty Baker, who managed the Giants during Lewis' tenure with San Francisco, named his own son after him.

== Career ==
During his 13-year career, Lewis established himself as one of top base stealers of the 1990s. He won a NL Gold Glove Award as a member of the Giants in 1994. He made postseason appearances with the Reds in 1995, and in 1998, 1999 with the Red Sox.

=== Errorless streak ===
On June 17, 1993, while playing for the San Francisco Giants, Lewis set a major league record by playing his 243rd consecutive errorless game, the longest stretch ever by an outfielder to begin a career. On July 16, 1993, against the New York Mets, he broke Don Demeter's all-time MLB record by playing his 267th consecutive game without an error. The streak continued until June 30, 1994, when the Giants played the Montreal Expos. Lewis was charged with his first error in 392 Major League games (938 chances) when a ball hit by Cliff Floyd skipped under his glove. His record was later broken by Atlanta Braves' right fielder Nick Markakis on June 18, 2015.

Defense was Lewis's strong point, recording a .994 fielding percentage playing at all three outfield positions. He committed only 16 errors in 2836 total chances in 9483 innings in the outfield.

== Post-baseball ==
Darren Lewis was an assistant baseball coach for California State University, East Bay. He left the position in 2016.

== See also ==
- List of Major League Baseball annual triples leaders
- List of Major League Baseball career stolen bases leaders
