= 1997 Philadelphia Phillies season =

Major League Baseball season

1997 Philadelphia Phillies
- League: National League
- Division: East
- Ballpark: Veterans Stadium
- City: Philadelphia
- Record: 68–94 (.420)
- Divisional place: 5th
- Owners: Bill Giles
- General managers: Lee Thomas
- Managers: Terry Francona
- Television: WPHL-TV; PRISM; SportsChannel Philadelphia (Harry Kalas, Richie Ashburn, Andy Musser, Chris Wheeler, Kent Tekulve)
- Radio: WPHT (Harry Kalas, Richie Ashburn, Andy Musser, Chris Wheeler)

The 1997 Philadelphia Phillies season was the 115th season in the history of the franchise.

== Offseason ==
- November 21, 1996: Rex Hudler was signed as a free agent by the Phillies.
- November 27, 1996: Ricardo Jordan and Toby Borland were traded by the Phillies to the New York Mets for Rico Brogna.
- December 12, 1996: Mark Portugal was signed as a free agent by the Phillies.
- February 25, 1997: Danny Tartabull was signed as a free agent by the Phillies.

== Regular season ==
On June 28, 1997, the Phillies played the Atlanta Braves at Turner Field in Atlanta. In honor of the 50th anniversary of Jackie Robinson breaking professional baseball's color line, the Braves hosted a Turn Back the Clock game. The Braves wore 1938 Atlanta Black Crackers home uniforms and the Phillies wore 1938 Philadelphia Stars road uniforms. In 1938, the Black Crackers had played in the Negro American League and the Stars in the Negro National League.

**Jackie**
**Robinson**
2B
MLB–retired 1997

=== J. D. Drew ===
Phillies' first round draft pick J. D. Drew and his agent Scott Boras elected not to sign with the Phillies, sticking to their guarantee that they would not sign for less than $10 million. The Phillies had no plan to pay an unproven player this amount of money, and despite Boras' warnings, drafted Drew nonetheless. Consequently, Drew ended up playing for the St. Paul Saints of the independent Northern League.

=== Season standings ===
The Phillies played extremely poorly in the first 100 games of the season, going 30–70, including a 4–22 stretch in the month of June. The team made a miraculous comeback in the last 62 games, going 38–24, the best of any team in the National League during that span. It was not enough, however, to get them out of last place.

NL East
Team	W	L	Pct.	GB	Home	Road
Atlanta Braves	101	61	.623	—	50‍–‍31	51‍–‍30
Florida Marlins	92	70	.568	9	52‍–‍29	40‍–‍41
New York Mets	88	74	.543	13	50‍–‍31	38‍–‍43
Montreal Expos	78	84	.481	23	45‍–‍36	33‍–‍48
Philadelphia Phillies	68	94	.420	33	38‍–‍43	30‍–‍51

=== Record vs. opponents ===
1997 National League record Source: MLB Standings Grid – 1997
Team	ATL	CHC	CIN	COL	FLA	HOU	LAD	MON	NYM	PHI	PIT	SD	SF	STL	AL
Atlanta	—	9–2	9–2	5–6	4–8	7–4	6–5	10–2	5–7	10–2	5–6	8–3	7–4	8–3	8–7
Chicago	2–9	—	7–5	2–9	2–9	3–9	5–6	4–7	6–5	6–5	7–5	6–5	5–6	4–8	9–6
Cincinnati	2–9	5–7	—	5–6	5–6	5–7	6–5	6–5	2–9	8–3	8–4	5–6	4–7	6–6	9–6
Colorado	6–5	9–2	6–5	—	7–4	5–6	5–7	7–4	6–5	4–7	4–7	4–8	4–8	7–4	9–7
Florida	8–4	9–2	6–5	4–7	—	7–4	7–4	7–5	4–8	6–6	7–4	5–6	5–6	5–6	12–3
Houston	4–7	9–3	7–5	6–5	4–7	—	7–4	8–3	7–4	4–7	6–6	6–5	3–8	9–3	4–11
Los Angeles	5–6	6–5	5–6	7–5	4–7	4–7	—	7–4	6–5	10–1	9–2	5–7	6–6	5–6	9–7
Montreal	2–10	7–4	5–6	4–7	5–7	3–8	4–7	—	5–7	6–6	5–6	8–3	6–5	6–5	12–3
New York	7–5	5–6	9–2	5–6	8–4	4–7	5–6	7–5	—	7–5	7–4	5–6	3–8	9–2	7–8
Philadelphia	2–10	5–6	3–8	7–4	6–6	7–4	1–10	6–6	5–7	—	5–6	7–4	3–8	6–5	5–10
Pittsburgh	6–5	5–7	4–8	7–4	4–7	6–6	2–9	6–5	4–7	6–5	—	5–6	8–3	9–3	7–8
San Diego	3–8	5–6	6–5	8–4	6–5	5–6	7–5	3–8	6–5	4–7	6–5	—	4–8	5–6	8–8
San Francisco	4–7	6–5	7–4	8–4	6–5	8–3	6–6	5–6	8–3	8–3	3–8	8–4	—	3–8	10–6
St. Louis	3–8	8–4	6–6	4–7	6–5	3–9	6–5	5–6	2–9	5–6	3–9	6–5	8–3	—	8–7

=== Notable transactions ===
- June 3, 1997: J. D. Drew was drafted by the Phillies in the 1st round (2nd pick) of the 1997 Major League Baseball draft, but did not sign.
- July 8, 1997: Midre Cummings was selected off waivers by the Phillies from the Pittsburgh Pirates.

=== 1997 Game Log ===
Legend
	Phillies win
	Phillies loss
	Postponement
**Bold**	Phillies team member

1997 Game Log
Overall Record: 68–94
April (8–16)

#	Date	Opponent	Score	Win	Loss	Save	Attendance	Record
1	April 1	@ Dodgers	3–0	**Curt Schilling** (1–0)	Ramón Martínez (0–1)	**Ricky Bottalico** (1)	53,079	1–0
2	April 2	@ Dodgers	1–5	Hideo Nomo (1–0)	**Calvin Maduro** (0–1)	Darren Dreifort (1)	37,195	1–1
3	April 3	@ Dodgers	1–2	Ismael Valdez (1–0)	**Mark Leiter** (0–1)	Todd Worrell (1)	26,579	1–2
4	April 4	@ Padres	3–13	Tim Worrell (1–0)	**Bobby Muñoz** (0–1)	None	20,903	1–3
5	April 5	@ Padres	1–4	Sterling Hitchcock (1–0)	**Mike Mimbs** (0–1)	Trevor Hoffman (1)	44,807	1–4
6	April 6	@ Padres	3–2	**Curt Schilling** (2–0)	Joey Hamilton (1–1)	**Ricky Bottalico** (2)	37,016	2–4
7	April 7	@ Giants	3–4	Shawn Estes (1–0)	**Calvin Maduro** (0–2)	Rod Beck (4)	7,525	2–5
8	April 8	@ Giants	2–1	**Mark Leiter** (1–1)	Osvaldo Fernández (1–1)	**Ricky Bottalico** (3)	6,260	3–5
9	April 9	@ Giants	0–3	Kirk Rueter (1–0)	**Bobby Muñoz** (0–2)	Rod Beck (5)	7,617	3–6
10	April 11	Padres	3–8	Sterling Hitchcock (2–0)	**Curt Schilling** (2–1)	None	36,774	3–7
–	April 12	Padres	Postponed (rain); Makeup: August 25 as a traditional double-header					
11	April 13	Padres	1–3	Tim Scott (1–0)	**Ricky Bottalico** (0–1)	Trevor Hoffman (2)	16,613	3–8
12	April 15	Giants	4–8	William Van Landingham (1–0)	**Bobby Muñoz** (0–3)	None	12,099	3–9
13	April 16	Giants	5–6 (10)	Jim Poole (1–0)	**Reggie Harris** (0–1)	Rod Beck (8)	12,109	3–10
–	April 17	Expos	Postponed (rain); Makeup: April 20 as a traditional double-header					
14	April 18	Expos	8–3	**Calvin Maduro** (1–2)	Jim Bullinger (0–3)	None	11,883	4–10
15	April 19	Expos	10–8	**Mark Leiter** (2–1)	Carlos Pérez (2–1)	**Ricky Bottalico** (4)	17,426	5–10
16	April 20 (1)	Expos	1–5	Jeff Juden (2–0)	**Bobby Muñoz** (0–4)	Dave Veres (1)	see 2nd game	5–11
17	April 20 (2)	Expos	0–3	Pedro Martínez (2–0)	**Mark Portugal** (0–1)	Ugueth Urbina (1)	20,262	5–12
18	April 21	@ Pirates	10–2	**Curt Schilling** (3–1)	Steve Cooke (1–3)	None	9,015	6–12
19	April 23	@ Pirates	2–3	Ricardo Rincón (2–1)	**Jerry Spradlin** (0–1)	None	8,850	6–13
20	April 25	@ Reds	10–7	**Mark Leiter** (3–1)	Dave Burba (3–2)	**Ricky Bottalico** (5)	22,843	7–13
21	April 26	@ Reds	2–10	Pete Schourek (1–2)	**Curt Schilling** (3–2)	None	27,357	7–14
–	April 27	@ Reds	Postponed (rain); Makeup: May 26 as a traditional double-header					
22	April 28	Pirates	4–9 (12)	Marc Wilkins (1–0)	**Mike Mimbs** (0–2)	None	12,017	7–15
23	April 29	Pirates	8–2	**Calvin Maduro** (2–2)	Matt Ruebel (1–2)	None	12,453	8–15
24	April 30	Dodgers	5–7	Hideo Nomo (3–2)	**Mark Leiter** (3–2)	Todd Worrell (7)	15,872	8–16

May (11–18)

#	Date	Opponent	Score	Win	Loss	Save	Attendance	Record
25	May 1	Dodgers	0–5	Pedro Astacio (3–0)	**Curt Schilling** (3–3)	None	16,546	8–17
26	May 2	@ Rockies	7–4	**Bobby Muñoz** (1–4)	Mark Thompson (3–2)	**Ricky Bottalico** (6)	48,031	9–17
27	May 3	@ Rockies	3–7	Jamey Wright (4–1)	**Mark Portugal** (0–2)	None	48,050	9–18
28	May 4	@ Rockies	0–9	Roger Bailey (4–1)	**Calvin Maduro** (2–3)	None	48,107	9–19
29	May 5	@ Astros	2–9	Chris Holt (3–3)	**Mark Leiter** (3–3)	None	11,268	9–20
30	May 6	@ Astros	5–1	**Curt Schilling** (4–3)	Ramón García (2–2)	None	12,179	10–20
31	May 7	@ Cardinals	7–14	John Frascatore (2–1)	**Reggie Harris** (0–2)	None	23,388	10–21
32	May 8	@ Cardinals	2–6	Andy Benes (2–1)	**Mike Mimbs** (0–3)	None	32,264	10–22
33	May 9	Rockies	3–1	**Calvin Maduro** (3–3)	Roger Bailey (4–2)	**Ricky Bottalico** (7)	13,564	11–22
34	May 10	Rockies	5–4 (10)	**Ricky Bottalico** (1–1)	Steve Reed (0–1)	None	17,629	12–22
35	May 11	Rockies	3–1	**Curt Schilling** (5–3)	John Thomson (0–1)	None	21,282	13–22
36	May 12	Rockies	2–9	Mike DeJean (1–0)	**Bobby Muñoz** (1–5)	None	12,603	13–23
37	May 13	Cardinals	3–2	**Jerry Spradlin** (1–1)	T. J. Mathews (1–2)	**Ricky Bottalico** (8)	14,416	14–23
38	May 14	Cardinals	3–12	Todd Stottlemyre (2–2)	**Calvin Maduro** (3–4)	None	14,799	14–24
39	May 16	Astros	7–12	Chris Holt (5–3)	**Mark Leiter** (3–4)	None	13,456	14–25
40	May 17	Astros	4–2	**Curt Schilling** (6–3)	Shane Reynolds (4–4)	**Ricky Bottalico** (9)	17,138	15–25
41	May 18	Astros	5–3	**Garrett Stephenson** (1–0)	Mike Hampton (2–4)	**Ricky Bottalico** (10)	17,367	16–25
42	May 19	Astros	5–9	Darryl Kile (4–2)	**Calvin Maduro** (3–5)	None	15,122	16–26
43	May 20	@ Cubs	3–2	**Mark Leiter** (4–4)	Frank Castillo (2–6)	**Ricky Bottalico** (11)	20,186	17–26
44	May 21	@ Cubs	0–7	Kevin Foster (5–3)	**Edgar Ramos** (0–1)	None	22,881	17–27
45	May 22	Mets	3–10	Bobby J. Jones (8–2)	**Curt Schilling** (6–4)	None	18,486	17–28
46	May 23	Mets	2–1	**Garrett Stephenson** (2–0)	Dave Mlicki (0–4)	**Ricky Bottalico** (12)	15,501	18–28
47	May 24	Mets	4–8	Armando Reynoso (3–0)	**Calvin Maduro** (3–6)	John Franco (13)	19,090	18–29
–	May 25	Mets	Postponed (rain); Makeup: September 15 as a traditional double-header					
48	May 26 (1)	@ Reds	5–8	John Smiley (5–6)	**Mark Leiter** (4–5)	Mike Remlinger (2)	see 2nd game	18–30
49	May 26 (2)	@ Reds	4–8	Mike Morgan (2–4)	**Matt Beech** (0–1)	None	16,798	18–31
50	May 27	@ Reds	2–1	**Curt Schilling** (7–4)	Brett Tomko (0–1)	None	17,297	19–31
51	May 28	@ Reds	0–2	Kent Mercker (2–5)	**Garrett Stephenson** (2–1)	Jeff Shaw (7)	15,451	19–32
52	May 30	@ Mets	3–7	Dave Mlicki (1–4)	**Edgar Ramos** (0–2)	None	17,401	19–33
53	May 31	@ Mets	3–10	Armando Reynoso (4–0)	**Mark Leiter** (4–6)	None	28,526	19–34

June (4–22)

#	Date	Opponent	Score	Win	Loss	Save	Attendance	Record
54	June 1	@ Mets	5–8	Rick Reed (4–2)	**Matt Beech** (0–2)	Cory Lidle (1)	42,058	19–35
–	June 2	Reds	Postponed (rain); Makeup: September 12 as a traditional double-header					
55	June 3	Reds	2–3	Kent Mercker (3–5)	**Curt Schilling** (7–5)	Jeff Shaw (8)	14,340	19–36
56	June 4	Cubs	1–5	Frank Castillo (3–7)	**Garrett Stephenson** (2–2)	None	12,872	19–37
57	June 5	Cubs	9–8 (10)	**Ken Ryan** (1–0)	Terry Adams (0–2)	None	13,189	20–37
58	June 6	@ Pirates	4–5 (10)	Marc Wilkins (5–0)	**Jerry Spradlin** (1–2)	None	15,165	20–38
59	June 7	@ Pirates	2–9	Jon Lieber (3–7)	**Ryan Nye** (0–1)	None	25,664	20–39
60	June 8	@ Pirates	3–2	**Curt Schilling** (8–5)	Steve Cooke (5–7)	**Ricky Bottalico** (13)	30,667	21–39
61	June 10	@ Expos	5–8	Dave Veres (2–1)	**Ricky Bottalico** (1–2)	Lee Smith (5)	27,823	21–40
62	June 11	@ Expos	3–4	Jim Bullinger (4–5)	**Jerry Spradlin** (1–3)	Ugueth Urbina (10)	10,475	21–41
63	June 13	Blue Jays	4–3	**Wayne Gomes** (1–0)	Paul Spoljaric (0–3)	**Ricky Bottalico** (14)	26,799	22–41
64	June 14	Blue Jays	2–3	Robert Person (2–4)	**Ryan Nye** (0–2)	Paul Quantrill (4)	22,582	22–42
65	June 15	Blue Jays	1–11	Pat Hentgen (7–3)	**Mark Leiter** (4–7)	None	30,516	22–43
66	June 16	@ Red Sox	4–5 (10)	John Wasdin (1–3)	**Ricky Bottalico** (1–3)	None	26,926	22–44
67	June 17	@ Red Sox	6–12	Aaron Sele (8–5)	**Scott Ruffcorn** (0–1)	Kerry Lacy (3)	25,591	22–45
68	June 18	@ Red Sox	2–4	Jeff Suppan (2–0)	**Curt Schilling** (8–6)	Chris Hammond (1)	27,502	22–46
69	June 20	Braves	1–4	Tom Glavine (7–4)	**Mark Leiter** (4–8)	None	20,648	22–47
70	June 21	Braves	8–9	Brad Clontz (3–1)	**Ron Blazier** (0–1)	Mark Wohlers (15)	24,309	22–48
71	June 22	Braves	5–12	Greg Maddux (9–3)	**Garrett Stephenson** (2–3)	None	25,534	22–49
72	June 23	Marlins	9–3	**Curt Schilling** (9–6)	Rick Helling (2–5)	None	18,033	23–49
73	June 24	Marlins	1–4	Al Leiter (6–5)	**Scott Ruffcorn** (0–2)	Robb Nen (20)	16,300	23–50
74	June 25	Marlins	5–7	Alex Fernandez (8–6)	**Reggie Harris** (0–3)	Robb Nen (21)	20,324	23–51
75	June 26	@ Braves	4–5	Denny Neagle (11–1)	**Matt Beech** (0–3)	Mark Wohlers (16)	41,762	23–52
76	June 27	@ Braves	1–7	Greg Maddux (10–3)	**Garrett Stephenson** (2–4)	None	48,234	23–53
77	June 28	@ Braves	1–9	John Smoltz (7–7)	**Curt Schilling** (9–7)	None	48,557	23–54
78	June 29	@ Braves	5–6	Mike Bielecki (3–3)	**Billy Brewer** (0–1)	Mark Wohlers (17)	47,902	23–55
79	June 30	@ Orioles	1–8	Mike Mussina (10–2)	**Calvin Maduro** (3–7)	None	47,837	23–56

July (10–16)

#	Date	Opponent	Score	Win	Loss	Save	Attendance	Record
80	July 1	@ Orioles	1–4	Scott Erickson (11–3)	**Matt Beech** (0–4)	Randy Myers (26)	47,610	23–57
81	July 2	@ Orioles	6–10	Arthur Rhodes (5–2)	**Jerry Spradlin** (1–4)	None	47,785	23–58
82	July 3	Cubs	4–5	Geremi González (5–2)	**Curt Schilling** (9–8)	Mel Rojas (8)	40,213	23–59
83	July 4	Cubs	3–9	Terry Mulholland (6–9)	**Scott Ruffcorn** (0–3)	Kent Bottenfield (2)	14,378	23–60
84	July 5	Cubs	9–7	**Reggie Harris** (1–3)	Bob Patterson (1–4)	**Ricky Bottalico** (15)	37,680	24–60
85	July 6	Cubs	4–8	Frank Castillo (6–9)	**Mark Leiter** (4–9)	Mel Rojas (9)	18,392	24–61
–	July 8	**1997 Major League Baseball All-Star Game at Jacobs Field in Cleveland**						
86	July 10	@ Marlins	7–8	Robb Nen (6–2)	**Jerry Spradlin** (1–5)	None	23,438	24–62
87	July 11	@ Marlins	13–3	**Curt Schilling** (10–8)	Kevin Brown (8–6)	None	22,225	25–62
–	July 12	@ Marlins	Postponed (rain); Makeup: September 17 as a traditional double-header					
88	July 13	@ Marlins	3–9	Alex Fernandez (10–7)	**Mark Leiter** (4–10)	None	26,860	25–63
89	July 14	@ Braves	6–10	Kevin Millwood (1–0)	**Billy Brewer** (0–2)	Mark Wohlers (22)	38,118	25–64
90	July 15	@ Braves	8–1	**Garrett Stephenson** (3–4)	John Smoltz (8–8)	None	39,494	26–64
91	July 16	Expos	6–0	**Curt Schilling** (11–8)	Jim Bullinger (6–9)	None	16,202	27–64
92	July 17	Expos	4–5	Carlos Pérez (9–6)	**Matt Beech** (0–5)	Ugueth Urbina (17)	17,127	27–65
93	July 18	Pirates	8–6	**Mark Leiter** (5–10)	Jon Lieber (6–9)	**Ricky Bottalico** (16)	19,676	28–65
94	July 19	Pirates	3–13	Steve Cooke (8–9)	**Tyler Green** (0–1)	None	17,472	28–66
95	July 20	Pirates	4–1	**Garrett Stephenson** (4–4)	Jason Schmidt (4–6)	**Ricky Bottalico** (17)	20,431	29–66
96	July 21	Pirates	2–3	Esteban Loaiza (7–7)	**Curt Schilling** (11–9)	Rich Loiselle (14)	19,303	29–67
97	July 22	@ Giants	5–8	Mark Gardner (11–4)	**Jerry Spradlin** (1–6)	Rod Beck (31)	12,630	29–68
98	July 23	@ Giants	4–16	Shawn Estes (13–4)	**Mark Leiter** (5–11)	None	14,591	29–69
99	July 24	@ Giants	7–4	**Wayne Gomes** (2–0)	Joe Roa (2–5)	**Ricky Bottalico** (18)	13,520	30–69
100	July 25	@ Dodgers	1–8	Chan Ho Park (9–5)	**Garrett Stephenson** (4–5)	None	42,198	30–70
101	July 26	@ Dodgers	1–4	Darren Dreifort (4–1)	**Curt Schilling** (11–10)	Todd Worrell (24)	43,603	30–71
102	July 27	@ Dodgers	1–7	Tom Candiotti (7–3)	**Matt Beech** (0–6)	None	36,481	30–72
103	July 28	@ Padres	8–4	**Mark Leiter** (6–11)	Sean Bergman (2–4)	None	17,382	31–72
104	July 29	@ Padres	6–5	**Tyler Green** (1–1)	Andy Ashby (6–7)	**Ricky Bottalico** (19)	21,710	32–72
105	July 31	Cardinals	2–1 (10)	**Ricky Bottalico** (2–3)	Tony Fossas (1–3)	None	18,409	33–72

August (17–10)

#	Date	Opponent	Score	Win	Loss	Save	Attendance	Record
106	August 1	Cardinals	4–1	**Garrett Stephenson** (5–5)	Andy Benes (7–6)	**Ricky Bottalico** (20)	17,171	34–72
107	August 2	Cardinals	1–2	Todd Stottlemyre (11–7)	**Matt Beech** (0–7)	Dennis Eckersley (27)	16,190	34–73
108	August 3	Cardinals	10–1	**Mark Leiter** (7–11)	Donovan Osborne (1–4)	None	20,094	35–73
109	August 4	Rockies	7–3	**Tyler Green** (2–1)	Frank Castillo (8–10)	None	15,230	36–73
110	August 5	Rockies	2–4	Darren Holmes (4–2)	**Ricky Bottalico** (2–4)	Jerry Dipoto (4)	16,428	36–74
111	August 6	Astros	6–4	**Garrett Stephenson** (6–5)	Ramón García (4–8)	**Ricky Bottalico** (21)	15,557	37–74
112	August 7	Astros	6–5 (11)	**Billy Brewer** (1–2)	Tom Martin (4–3)	None	18,046	38–74
113	August 8	@ Cardinals	1–6	Donovan Osborne (2–4)	**Mark Leiter** (7–12)	None	38,300	38–75
114	August 9	@ Cardinals	3–2	**Tyler Green** (3–1)	Manny Aybar (0–2)	**Ricky Bottalico** (22)	42,926	39–75
115	August 10	@ Cardinals	8–0	**Curt Schilling** (12–10)	Matt Morris (8–7)	None	31,816	40–75
116	August 12	@ Rockies	5–0	**Matt Beech** (1–7)	John Thomson (4–7)	None	48,228	41–75
117	August 13	@ Rockies	12–8	**Mark Leiter** (8–12)	Jamey Wright (6–8)	None	48,491	42–75
118	August 15	@ Astros	5–1	**Curt Schilling** (13–10)	Chris Holt (7–9)	None	31,837	43–75
119	August 16	@ Astros	5–3	**Jerry Spradlin** (2–6)	Billy Wagner (7–5)	**Ricky Bottalico** (23)	28,260	44–75
120	August 17	@ Astros	6–11	Tom Martin (5–3)	**Wayne Gomes** (2–1)	Russ Springer (2)	23,161	44–76
121	August 18	Giants	12–3	**Matt Beech** (2–7)	Mark Gardner (12–7)	None	15,478	45–76
122	August 19	Giants	5–9	Shawn Estes (16–4)	**Mark Leiter** (8–13)	None	17,379	45–77
–	August 20	Giants	Postponed (rain); Makeup: September 11					
123	August 22	Dodgers	3–5	Antonio Osuna (2–3)	**Ricky Bottalico** (2–5)	Todd Worrell (32)	21,060	45–78
124	August 23	Dodgers	3–4	Hideo Nomo (12–10)	**Tyler Green** (3–2)	Todd Worrell (33)	31,159	45–79
125	August 24	Dodgers	1–5	Ismael Valdez (9–10)	**Matt Beech** (2–8)	None	23,363	45–80
126	August 25 (1)	Padres	10–1	**Mark Leiter** (9–13)	Will Cunnane (6–3)	None	see 2nd game	46–80
127	August 25 (2)	Padres	6–4	**Ron Blazier** (1–1)	Andy Ashby (6–10)	**Ricky Bottalico** (24)	16,025	47–80
128	August 26	Padres	4–2	**Mike Grace** (1–0)	Sterling Hitchcock (9–8)	**Ricky Bottalico** (25)	14,491	48–80
129	August 27	Padres	7–6 (12)	**Wayne Gomes** (3–1)	Jim Bruske (3–1)	None	16,156	49–80
130	August 29	@ Tigers	2–7	Willie Blair (14–6)	**Tyler Green** (3–3)	None	22,925	49–81
131	August 30	@ Tigers	2–0	**Matt Beech** (3–8)	Scott Sanders (4–12)	**Ricky Bottalico** (26)	22,537	50–81
132	August 31	@ Tigers	1–2	Justin Thompson (12–10)	**Mark Leiter** (9–14)	Todd Jones (25)	19,152	50–82

September (18–12)

#	Date	Opponent	Score	Win	Loss	Save	Attendance	Record
133	September 1	Yankees	5–1	**Curt Schilling** (14–10)	Hideki Irabu (4–3)	None	50,869	51–82
134	September 2	Yankees	5–0	**Mike Grace** (2–0)	Kenny Rogers (5–6)	None	37,258	52–82
135	September 3	Yankees	5–4	**Jerry Spradlin** (3–6)	Mike Stanton (6–1)	None	38,352	53–82
136	September 4	@ Expos	6–4	**Matt Beech** (4–8)	Pedro Martínez (16–7)	**Ricky Bottalico** (27)	9,447	54–82
137	September 5	@ Expos	1–7	Mike Johnson (2–3)	**Mark Leiter** (9–15)	None	11,193	54–83
138	September 6	@ Expos	5–3	**Curt Schilling** (15–10)	Marc Valdes (4–4)	None	16,623	55–83
139	September 7	@ Expos	2–1	**Ryan Karp** (1–0)	Anthony Telford (4–5)	**Ricky Bottalico** (28)	18,058	56–83
140	September 8	@ Mets	13–4	**Mike Grace** (3–0)	Jason Isringhausen (2–1)	None	13,321	57–83
141	September 9	@ Mets	1–0	**Tyler Green** (4–3)	Dave Mlicki (7–11)	**Ricky Bottalico** (29)	13,871	58–83
142	September 10	@ Mets	2–10	Brian Bohanon (5–4)	**Matt Beech** (4–9)	None	13,257	58–84
143	September 11	Giants	3–5	Roberto Hernández (8–2)	**Jerry Spradlin** (3–7)	Rod Beck (36)	18,165	58–85
144	September 12 (1)	Reds	2–4	Mike Remlinger (7–8)	**Garrett Stephenson** (6–6)	Jeff Shaw (35)	see 2nd game	58–86
145	September 12 (2)	Reds	9–1	**Mark Leiter** (10–15)	Pete Schourek (5–8)	None	17,546	59–86
146	September 13	Reds	0–3	Dave Burba (9–10)	**Mike Grace** (3–1)	Jeff Shaw (36)	15,524	59–87
147	September 14	Reds	4–6	Brett Tomko (11–6)	**Tyler Green** (4–4)	Jeff Shaw (37)	20,518	59–88
148	September 15 (1)	Mets	5–10	Cory Lidle (7–1)	**Ryan Karp** (1–1)	None	see 2nd game	59–89
149	September 15 (2)	Mets	2–1	**Darrin Winston** (1–0)	Joe Crawford (2–3)	**Ricky Bottalico** (30)	14,416	60–89
150	September 16	Mets	3–2	**Curt Schilling** (16–10)	Rick Reed (12–9)	None	16,585	61–89
151	September 17 (1)	@ Marlins	5–2	**Garrett Stephenson** (7–6)	Liván Hernández (9–2)	**Ricky Bottalico** (31)	see 2nd game	62–89
152	September 17 (2)	@ Marlins	2–5	Tony Saunders (4–6)	**Mark Leiter** (10–16)	Robb Nen (34)	26,305	62–90
153	September 18	@ Marlins	2–8	Kevin Brown (15–8)	**Mike Grace** (3–2)	None	16,677	62–91
154	September 19	@ Cubs	10–5	**Darrin Winston** (2–0)	Mark Clark (13–8)	**Jerry Spradlin** (1)	18,174	63–91
155	September 20	@ Cubs	3–2	**Wayne Gomes** (4–1)	Terry Adams (2–9)	**Ricky Bottalico** (32)	38,313	64–91
156	September 21	@ Cubs	3–11	Kevin Tapani (8–3)	**Curt Schilling** (16–11)	None	29,922	64–92
157	September 23	Braves	0–6	Kevin Millwood (5–3)	**Mark Leiter** (10–17)	None	14,264	64–93
158	September 24	Braves	5–1	**Garrett Stephenson** (8–6)	Paul Byrd (4–4)	None	16,772	65–93
159	September 25	Braves	2–3 (10)	Mike Cather (2–4)	**Jerry Spradlin** (3–8)	Brad Clontz (1)	15,030	65–94
160	September 26	Marlins	5–3	**Curt Schilling** (17–11)	Antonio Alfonseca (1–3)	**Ricky Bottalico** (33)	18,007	66–94
161	September 27	Marlins	8–7	**Jerry Spradlin** (4–8)	Rob Stanifer (1–2)	None	17,664	67–94
162	September 28	Marlins	8–7	**Wayne Gomes** (5–1)	Félix Heredia (5–3)	**Ricky Bottalico** (34)	26,509	68–94

=== Roster ===
1997 Philadelphia Phillies
**Roster**
**Pitchers**: 55 Matt Beech; 22 Ron Blazier; 52 Ricky Bottalico; 49 Billy Brewer; 61 Wayne Gomes; 44 Mike Grace; 28 Tyler Green; 40 Reggie Harris; 57 Ryan Karp; 31 Mark Leiter; 50 Calvin Maduro; 47 Mike Mimbs; 35 Bobby Muñoz; 35 Ryan Nye; 41 Erik Plantenberg; 21 Mark Portugal; 49 Edgar Ramos; 33 Scott Ruffcorn; 51 Ken Ryan; 38 Curt Schilling; 48 Jerry Spradlin; 54 Garrett Stephenson; 58 Darrin Winston	**Catchers**: 27 Bobby Estalella; 24 Mike Lieberthal; 8 Mark Parent; **Infielders**: 2 Rico Brogna; 23 Kevin Jordan; 12 Mickey Morandini; 13 Desi Relaford; 17 Scott Rolen; 11 Kevin Sefcik; 19 Kevin Stocker	**Outfielders**: 37 Rubén Amaro, Jr.; 53 Tony Barron; 5 Rob Butler; 16 Midre Cummings; 10 Darren Daulton; 14 Rex Hudler; 25 Gregg Jefferies; 29 Wendell Magee; 34 Derrick May; 41 Billy McMillon; 15 Ricky Otero; 34 Mike Robertson; 45 Danny Tartabull	**Manager**: 7 Terry Francona; **Coaches**: 42 Galen Cisco (Pitching); 3 Chuck Cottier; 56 Hal McRae (Hitting); 9 Brad Mills (First Base); 59 Joe Rigoli (Bullpen); 18 John Vukovich

== Player stats ==
=== Batting ===
==== Starters by position ====
Note: Pos = Position; G = Games played; AB = At bats; H = Hits; Avg. = Batting average; HR = Home runs; RBI = Runs batted in

Pos	Player	G	AB	H	Avg.	HR	RBI
C	Mike Lieberthal	134	455	112	.246	20	77
1B	Rico Brogna	148	543	137	.252	20	81
2B	Mickey Morandini	150	553	163	.295	1	39
SS	Kevin Stocker	149	504	134	.266	4	40
3B	Scott Rolen	156	561	159	.283	21	92
LF	Gregg Jeffries	130	476	122	.256	11	48
CF	Midre Cummings	63	208	63	.303	1	23
RF	Darren Daulton	84	269	71	.264	11	42

==== Other batters ====
Note: G = Games played; AB = At bats; H = Hits; Avg. = Batting average; HR = Home runs; RBI = Runs batted in

Player	G	AB	H	Avg.	HR	RBI
Tony Barron	57	189	54	.286	4	24
Kevin Jordan	84	177	47	.266	6	30
Rubén Amaro Jr.	117	175	41	.234	2	21
Ricky Otero	50	151	38	.252	0	3
Derrick May	83	149	34	.228	1	13
Rex Hudler	50	122	27	.221	5	10
Kevin Sefcik	61	119	32	.269	2	6
Wendell Magee	38	115	23	.200	1	9
Mark Parent	39	113	17	.150	0	8
Rob Butler	43	89	26	.292	0	13
Billy McMillon	24	72	21	.292	2	13
Desi Relaford	15	38	7	.184	0	6
Mike Robertson	22	38	8	.211	0	4
Bobby Estalella	13	29	10	.345	4	9
Danny Tartabull	3	7	0	.000	0	0

=== Pitching ===
==== Starting pitchers ====
Note: G = Games pitched; IP = Innings pitched; W = Wins; L = Losses; ERA = Earned run average; SO = Strikeouts

Player	G	IP	W	L	ERA	SO
Curt Schilling	35	254.1	17	11	2.97	319
Mark Leiter	31	182.2	10	17	5.67	148
Matt Beech	24	136.2	4	9	5.07	120
Garrett Stephenson	20	117.0	8	6	3.15	81
Tyler Green	14	76.2	4	4	4.93	58
Calvin Maduro	15	71.0	3	7	7.23	31
Mike Grace	6	39.0	3	2	3.46	26
Bobby Muñoz	8	33.1	1	5	8.91	20
Mark Portugal	3	13.2	0	2	4.61	2

==== Other pitchers ====
Note: G = Games pitched; IP = Innings pitched; W = Wins; L = Losses; ERA = Earned run average; SO = Strikeouts

Player	G	IP	W	L	ERA	SO
Scott Ruffcorn	18	39.2	0	3	7.71	33
Edgar Ramos	4	14.0	0	2	5.14	4
Ryan Nye	4	12.0	0	2	8.25	7

==== Relief pitchers ====
Note: G = Games pitched; W = Wins; L = Losses; SV = Saves; ERA = Earned run average; SO = Strikeouts

Player	G	W	L	SV	ERA	SO
Ricky Bottalico	69	2	5	34	3.65	89
Jerry Spradlin	76	4	8	1	4.74	67
Reggie Harris	50	1	3	0	5.30	45
Wayne Gomes	37	5	1	0	5.27	24
Ron Blazier	36	1	1	0	5.03	42
Erik Plantenberg	35	0	0	0	4.91	12
Billy Brewer	25	1	2	0	3.27	16
Ken Ryan	22	1	0	0	9.58	10
Mike Mimbs	17	0	3	0	7.53	29
Ryan Karp	15	1	1	0	5.40	18
Darrin Winston	7	2	0	0	5.25	8

== Farm system ==
Level	Team	League	Manager
AAA	Scranton/Wilkes-Barre; Red Barons	International League	Marc Bombard
AA	Reading Phillies	Eastern League	Al LeBoeuf
A	Clearwater Phillies	Florida State League	Roy Majtyka
A	Piedmont Boll Weevils	South Atlantic League	Ken Oberkfell
A-Short Season	Batavia Clippers	New York–Penn League	Greg Legg
Rookie	Martinsville Phillies	Appalachian League	Kelly Heath
