= 1997 New York Mets season =

1997 New York Mets
- League: National League
- Division: East
- Ballpark: Shea Stadium
- City: New York
- Record: 88–74 (.543)
- Divisional place: 3rd
- Owners: Fred Wilpon and Nelson Doubleday, Jr.
- General managers: Joe McIlvaine, Steve Phillips
- Manager: Bobby Valentine
- Television: WWOR-TV/SportsChannel New York (Ralph Kiner, Tim McCarver, Fran Healy, Howie Rose, Gary Thorne)
- Radio: WFAN (Bob Murphy, Gary Cohen, Ed Coleman); WADO (spanish) (Juan Alicea, Billy Berroa)

The 1997 New York Mets season was the 36th regular season for the Mets. They went 88–74 and finished third in the National League East, thirteen games behind the first place Atlanta Braves. The Mets were managed by Bobby Valentine. They played home games at Shea Stadium. It was their first winning season since 1990, despite not making the playoffs.

== Offseason ==
- November 25, 1996: Paul Byrd and a player to be named later were traded by the Mets to the Atlanta Braves for Greg McMichael. The Mets completed the deal by sending Andy Zwirchitz (minors) to the Braves on May 25, 1997.
- November 27, 1996: Rico Brogna was traded by the Mets to the Philadelphia Phillies for Ricardo Jordan and Toby Borland.
- December 20, 1996: Robert Person was traded by the Mets to the Toronto Blue Jays for John Olerud and cash.
- March 22, 1997: Héctor Ramírez was traded by the Mets to the Baltimore Orioles for Scott McClain and Manny Alexander.

== Regular season ==
For the first time since 1990, the Mets finished the regular season with a winning record. Their offensive output was led by their corner infielders, the 23-year old third baseman Edgardo Alfonzo and the two-time former world champion first baseman John Olerud, the latter of whom was acquired in a trade with the Toronto Blue Jays. Alfonzo, in his first full season as a starter, led the team with a .315 average and 163 hits while Olerud notched a .294 average and drove in 102 runs to lead the Mets in that category. Catcher Todd Hundley, a year removed from his record setting 1996 campaign, led the team in home runs with 30 and added 86 RBI, one of five Mets to record 70 or more (joining Alfonzo, Olerud, Bernard Gilkey, and Butch Huskey).

After a year out of baseball, Rick Reed joined the Mets' starting rotation and led them with a 2.89 ERA. Bobby Jones led with fifteen wins, with Reed recording thirteen. John Franco saved 36 games, his most since 1988.

=== Jackie Robinson tribute ===
On April 15 the Mets hosted ceremonies marking the 50th anniversary of Jackie Robinson's first game with the Brooklyn Dodgers before their game against the Los Angeles Dodgers at Shea Stadium. The ceremony was attended by President Bill Clinton and commissioner Bud Selig announced that Robinson's jersey number, 42, would be retired permanently across baseball. The Mets won the game 5–0.

=== Subway Series ===
Interleague play was brought to MLB in 1997 and the Mets played New York Yankees in June as part of the first ever regular season games that counted in the standings between the two teams (they had previously an exhibition game until 1983 during the season). The series took place at Yankee Stadium, and Mets won the first game by a score of 6–0.

=== Season standings ===
NL East
Team	W	L	Pct.	GB	Home	Road
Atlanta Braves	101	61	.623	—	50‍–‍31	51‍–‍30
Florida Marlins	92	70	.568	9	52‍–‍29	40‍–‍41
New York Mets	88	74	.543	13	50‍–‍31	38‍–‍43
Montreal Expos	78	84	.481	23	45‍–‍36	33‍–‍48
Philadelphia Phillies	68	94	.420	33	38‍–‍43	30‍–‍51

=== Record vs. opponents ===
1997 National League record Source: MLB Standings Grid – 1997
Team	ATL	CHC	CIN	COL	FLA	HOU	LAD	MON	NYM	PHI	PIT	SD	SF	STL	AL
Atlanta	—	9–2	9–2	5–6	4–8	7–4	6–5	10–2	5–7	10–2	5–6	8–3	7–4	8–3	8–7
Chicago	2–9	—	7–5	2–9	2–9	3–9	5–6	4–7	6–5	6–5	7–5	6–5	5–6	4–8	9–6
Cincinnati	2–9	5–7	—	5–6	5–6	5–7	6–5	6–5	2–9	8–3	8–4	5–6	4–7	6–6	9–6
Colorado	6–5	9–2	6–5	—	7–4	5–6	5–7	7–4	6–5	4–7	4–7	4–8	4–8	7–4	9–7
Florida	8–4	9–2	6–5	4–7	—	7–4	7–4	7–5	4–8	6–6	7–4	5–6	5–6	5–6	12–3
Houston	4–7	9–3	7–5	6–5	4–7	—	7–4	8–3	7–4	4–7	6–6	6–5	3–8	9–3	4–11
Los Angeles	5–6	6–5	5–6	7–5	4–7	4–7	—	7–4	6–5	10–1	9–2	5–7	6–6	5–6	9–7
Montreal	2–10	7–4	5–6	4–7	5–7	3–8	4–7	—	5–7	6–6	5–6	8–3	6–5	6–5	12–3
New York	7–5	5–6	9–2	5–6	8–4	4–7	5–6	7–5	—	7–5	7–4	5–6	3–8	9–2	7–8
Philadelphia	2–10	5–6	3–8	7–4	6–6	7–4	1–10	6–6	5–7	—	5–6	7–4	3–8	6–5	5–10
Pittsburgh	6–5	5–7	4–8	7–4	4–7	6–6	2–9	6–5	4–7	6–5	—	5–6	8–3	9–3	7–8
San Diego	3–8	5–6	6–5	8–4	6–5	5–6	7–5	3–8	6–5	4–7	6–5	—	4–8	5–6	8–8
San Francisco	4–7	6–5	7–4	8–4	6–5	8–3	6–6	5–6	8–3	8–3	3–8	8–4	—	3–8	10–6
St. Louis	3–8	8–4	6–6	4–7	6–5	3–9	6–5	5–6	2–9	5–6	3–9	6–5	8–3	—	8–7

=== Notable transactions ===
- June 3, 1997: 1997 Major League Baseball draft
  - Garrett Atkins was drafted by the Mets in the 10th round, but did not sign.
  - Jeremy Guthrie was drafted by the Mets in the 15th round, but did not sign.
- August 8, 1997: Lance Johnson and players to be named later were traded by the Mets to the Chicago Cubs for Brian McRae, Mel Rojas and Turk Wendell. The Mets completed the deal by sending Mark Clark to the Cubs on August 11 and Manny Alexander to the Cubs on August 14.

=== Game log ===
Legend
Mets Win	Mets Loss	Game Postponed	Eliminated from playoff spot
Bold = Mets team member

1997 Game Log
Overall: 88–74 (Home: 50–31; Away: 38–43)
April: (12–14) Home: 6–6; Away: 6–8

#	Date	Opponent	Score	Win	Loss	Save	Location	Attendance	Record
1	April 1	@ Padres	5–12	Hamilton (1–0)	**Pérez** (0–1)	—	Qualcomm Stadium	43,005	0–1
2	April 2	@ Padres	5–6 (12)	Bergman (1–0)	**Jordan** (0–1)	—	Qualcomm Stadium	16,465	0–2
3	April 3	@ Padres	4–1	**B. Jones** (1–0)	Valenzuela (0–1)	**Franco** (1)	Qualcomm Stadium	21,611	1–2
4	April 4	@ Giants	4–6	Rodriguez (1–1)	**Jordan** (0–2)	Beck (1)	3Com Park	8,380	1–3
5	April 5	@ Giants	0–2	Roa (1–0)	**Manuel** (0–1)	Beck (2)	3Com Park	13,768	1–4
6	April 6	@ Giants	4–2	**Bohanon** (1–0)	Gardner (0–1)	**Franco** (2)	3Com Park	15,073	2–4
7	April 7	@ Dodgers	2–3 (15)	Astacio (1–0)	**Crawford** (0–1)	—	Dodger Stadium	27,547	2–5
8	April 8	@ Dodgers	5–3	**B. Jones** (2–0)	Valdez (1–1)	**McMichael** (1)	Dodger Stadium	27,318	3–5
9	April 9	@ Dodgers	2–3 (14)	Candiotti (2–0)	**Bohanon** (1–1)	—	Dodger Stadium	28,056	3–6
–	April 12	Giants	Postponed (rain); rescheduled for April 13						
10	April 13 (1)	Giants	1–5	Gardner (1–1)	**Clark** (0–1)	—	**Shea Stadium**	N/A	3–7
11	April 13 (2)	Giants	6–7	Estes (2–0)	**B. Jones** (2–1)	Beck (6)	**Shea Stadium**	21,981	3–8
12	April 14	Giants	2–3	Rodriguez (2–1)	**McMichael** (0–1)	Beck (7)	**Shea Stadium**	12,001	3–9
13	April 15	Dodgers	5–0	**Reynoso** (1–0)	Valdez (1–2)	**Borland** (1)	**Shea Stadium**	54,047	4–9
14	April 16	Dodgers	2–5	Astacio (2–0)	**Reed** (0–1)	Worrell (4)	**Shea Stadium**	13,759	4–10
–	April 18	Cubs	Postponed (rain); rescheduled for April 20						
15	April 19	Cubs	6–3	**Clark** (1–1)	Wendell (0–2)	**Franco** (3)	**Shea Stadium**	15,849	5–10
16	April 20 (1)	Cubs	8–2	**B. Jones** (3–1)	Trachsel (0–3)	—	**Shea Stadium**	N/A	6–10
17	April 20 (2)	Cubs	3–4	Foster (1–1)	**Mlicki** (0–1)	Wendell (1)	**Shea Stadium**	18,484	6–11
18	April 21	Cubs	4–6	Castillo (1–3)	**McMichael** (0–2)	Adams (1)	**Shea Stadium**	13,250	6–12
19	April 22	Reds	7–2	**Reed** (1–1)	Smiley (1–4)	—	**Shea Stadium**	14,585	7–12
20	April 23	Reds	10–2	**Clark** (2–1)	Morgan (0–2)	—	**Shea Stadium**	26,492	8–12
21	April 25	@ Expos	1–4	Pérez (3–1)	**B. Jones** (3–2)	—	Olympic Stadium	17,776	8–13
22	April 26	@ Expos	1–8	Martínez (3–0)	**Mlicki** (0–2)	—	Olympic Stadium	42,888	8–14
23	April 27	@ Expos	5–3 (10)	**McMichael** (1–2)	Smith (0–1)	**Franco** (4)	Olympic Stadium	15,925	9–14
24	April 28	@ Reds	15–2	**Reed** (2–1)	Smiley (1–5)	—	Cinergy Field	15,572	10–14
25	April 29	@ Reds	3–1	**Clark** (3–1)	Morgan (0–3)	**Franco** (5)	Cinergy Field	17,699	11–14
26	April 30	Padres	6–2	**B. Jones** (4–2)	Hitchcock (2–2)	**Franco** (6)	**Shea Stadium**	12,429	12–14

May: (18–9) Home: 8–4; Away: 10–5

#	Date	Opponent	Score	Win	Loss	Save	Location	Attendance	Record
27	May 1	Padres	3–7	Ashby	**Mlicki**	—	**Shea Stadium**	12,344	12–15
28	May 2	Cardinals	7–4	**McMichael**	Mathews	**Franco**	**Shea Stadium**	14,877	13–15
29	May 3	Cardinals	5–1	**Reed**	Benes	—	**Shea Stadium**	16,248	14–15
30	May 4	Cardinals	2–8	Stottlemyre	**Clark**	—	**Shea Stadium**	17,652	14–16
31	May 5	@ Rockies	6–1	**B. Jones**	Ritz	—	Coors Field	48,036	15–16
32	May 6	@ Rockies	11–12	Swift	**Borland**	Reed	Coors Field	48,020	15–17
33	May 7	@ Astros	4–1	**Reynoso**	Martin	**Franco**	Astrodome	12,574	16–17
34	May 8	@ Astros	2–4	Hampton	**Reed**	Wagner	Astrodome	12,842	16–18
35	May 9	@ Cardinals	10–3	**Clark**	Stottlemyre	—	Busch Stadium	32,054	17–18
36	May 10	@ Cardinals	2–0	**B. Jones**	Benes	**Franco**	Busch Stadium	43,747	18–18
37	May 11	@ Cardinals	6–4	**Lidle**	Eckersley	**Franco**	Busch Stadium	30,852	19–18
38	May 13	Astros	4–3	**McMichael**	Springer	**Franco**	**Shea Stadium**	13,997	20–18
39	May 14	Astros	0–1	Kile	**McMichael**	Wagner	**Shea Stadium**	13,051	20–19
40	May 16	Rockies	1–2	Munoz	**McMichael**	Ruffin	**Shea Stadium**	15,261	20–20
41	May 17	Rockies	3–1	**B. Jones**	Thomson	**Franco**	**Shea Stadium**	23,987	21–20
42	May 18	Rockies	10–4	**Kashiwada**	Ruffin	—	**Shea Stadium**	22,845	22–20
43	May 19	Rockies	4–3	**Lidle**	McCurry	—	**Shea Stadium**	14,248	23–20
44	May 20	@ Marlins	5–6	Nen	**Franco**	—	Pro Player Stadium	25,165	23–21
45	May 21	@ Marlins	2–1	**Clark**	Leiter	**McMichael**	Pro Player Stadium	27,058	24–21
46	May 22	@ Phillies	10–3	**B. Jones**	Schilling	—	Veterans Stadium	18,486	25–21
47	May 23	@ Phillies	1–2	Stephenson	**Mlicki**	Bottalico	Veterans Stadium	15,501	25–22
48	May 24	@ Phillies	8–4	**Reynoso**	Maduro	**Franco**	Veterans Stadium	19,090	26–22
–	May 25	@ Phillies	Postponed (rain); rescheduled for September 15						
49	May 26	@ Expos	4–3	**Lidle**	Urbina	**Franco**	Olympic Stadium	11,774	27–22
50	May 27	@ Expos	4–5	Valdes	**Clark**	Smith	Olympic Stadium	11,703	27–23
51	May 28	@ Expos	7–0	**B. Jones**	Martínez	—	Olympic Stadium	14,932	28–23
52	May 30	Phillies	7–3	**Mlicki**	Ramos	—	**Shea Stadium**	17,401	29–23
53	May 31	Phillies	10–3	**Reynoso**	Leiter	—	**Shea Stadium**	28,526	30–23

June: (15–12) Home: 10–5; Away: 5–7

#	Date	Opponent	Score	Win	Loss	Save	Location	Attendance	Record
54	June 1	Phillies	8–5				**Shea Stadium**	42,058	31–23
55	June 2	Expos	0–10				**Shea Stadium**	12,675	31–24
56	June 3	Expos	2–1				**Shea Stadium**	14,492	32–24
57	June 4	Marlins	2–5				**Shea Stadium**	17,083	32–25
58	June 5	Marlins	6–0				**Shea Stadium**	19,410	33–25
59	June 6	@ Reds	2–5				Cinergy Field	21,339	33–26
60	June 7	@ Reds	5–10				Cinergy Field	23,830	33–27
–	June 8	@ Reds	Postponed (rain); rescheduled for June 9						
61	June 9	@ Reds	4–2				Cinergy Field	23,079	34–27
62	June 10	@ Cubs	10–6				Wrigley Field	28,742	35–27
63	June 11	@ Cubs	4–5				Wrigley Field	24,703	35–28
64	June 13	Red Sox	4–8				**Shea Stadium**	44,443	35–29
65	June 14	Red Sox	5–2				**Shea Stadium**	35,456	36–29
66	June 15	Red Sox	1–10				**Shea Stadium**	23,557	36–30
67	June 16	@ Yankees	6–0				Yankee Stadium	56,188	37–30
68	June 17	@ Yankees	3–6				Yankee Stadium	56,253	37–31
69	June 18	@ Yankees	2–3 (10)				Yankee Stadium	56,278	37–32
70	June 19	Pirates	7–6				**Shea Stadium**	15,492	38–32
71	June 20	Pirates	1–0				**Shea Stadium**	18,737	39–32
72	June 21	Pirates	3–2				**Shea Stadium**	32,908	40–32
73	June 22	Pirates	12–9 (10)				**Shea Stadium**	23,247	41–32
74	June 23	Braves	3–2				**Shea Stadium**	22,193	42–32
75	June 24	Braves	6–5				**Shea Stadium**	26,663	43–32
76	June 25	Braves	7–14				**Shea Stadium**	27,980	43–33
77	June 27	@ Pirates	1–6				Three Rivers Stadium	18,103	43–34
78	June 28	@ Pirates	8–3				Three Rivers Stadium	23,711	44–34
79	June 29	@ Pirates	10–8				Three Rivers Stadium	26,499	45–34
80	June 30	@ Tigers	0–14				Tiger Stadium	15,009	45–35

July: (15–11) Home: 8–2; Away: 7–9

#	Date	Opponent	Score	Win	Loss	Save	Location	Attendance	Record
81	July 1	@ Tigers	6–8				Tiger Stadium	14,849	45–36
82	July 2	@ Tigers	7–9				Tiger Stadium	16,211	45–37
83	July 3	Marlins	4–10				**Shea Stadium**	18,134	45–38
84	July 4	Marlins	6–2				**Shea Stadium**	38,076	46–38
85	July 5	Marlins	5–3				**Shea Stadium**	23,681	47–38
86	July 6	Marlins	3–2 (12)				**Shea Stadium**	29,438	48–38
**68th All-Star Game in Cleveland, Ohio**
87	July 10	@ Braves	10–7				Atlanta-Fulton County Stadium	47,685	49–38
88	July 11	@ Braves	9–7				Atlanta-Fulton County Stadium	40,094	50–38
89	July 12	@ Braves	4–7				Atlanta-Fulton County Stadium	48,091	50–39
90	July 13	@ Braves	7–6 (10)				Atlanta-Fulton County Stadium	42,111	51–39
91	July 14	@ Pirates	4–5				Three Rivers Stadium	12,794	51–40
92	July 15	@ Pirates	3–4				Three Rivers Stadium	12,244	51–41
93	July 16	Cubs	5–6				**Shea Stadium**	20,282	51–42
94	July 17	Cubs	4–3 (10)				**Shea Stadium**	26,021	52–42
95	July 18	Reds	4–3				**Shea Stadium**	22,901	53–42
96	July 19	Reds	5–3				**Shea Stadium**	26,675	54–42
97	July 20	Reds	10–1				**Shea Stadium**	36,259	55–42
98	July 21	Reds	5–3				**Shea Stadium**	22,172	56–42
99	July 22	@ Dodgers	3–8				Dodger Stadium	33,358	56–43
100	July 23	@ Dodgers	2–1				Dodger Stadium	39,610	57–43
101	July 24	@ Dodgers	3–1				Dodger Stadium	53,655	58–43
102	July 25	@ Padres	4–2				Qualcomm Stadium	25,167	59–43
103	July 26	@ Padres	3–5				Qualcomm Stadium	53,871	59–44
104	July 27	@ Padres	3–5				Qualcomm Stadium	25,380	59–45
105	July 29	@ Giants	2–5				3Com Park	14,949	59–46
106	July 30	@ Giants	5–2				3Com Park	15,234	60–46

August: (13–16) Home: 8–9; Away: 5–7

#	Date	Opponent	Score	Win	Loss	Save	Location	Attendance	Record
107	August 1	@ Astros	8–5 (10)				Astrodome	33,589	61–46
108	August 2	@ Astros	0–6				Astrodome	31,929	61–47
109	August 3	@ Astros	2–3				Astrodome	35,788	61–48
110	August 4	Cardinals	4–2				**Shea Stadium**	17,944	62–48
111	August 5	Cardinals	5–4 (10)				**Shea Stadium**	22,777	63–48
112	August 6	Rockies	0–4				**Shea Stadium**	26,633	63–49
113	August 7	Rockies	12–4				**Shea Stadium**	29,536	64–49
114	August 8	Astros	6–1				**Shea Stadium**	23,818	65–49
115	August 9	Astros	3–8				**Shea Stadium**	34,352	65–50
116	August 10	Astros	8–11				**Shea Stadium**	32,914	65–51
117	August 11	Astros	3–8				**Shea Stadium**	20,452	65–52
118	August 12	@ Cardinals	2–5				Busch Stadium	32,547	65–53
119	August 13	@ Cardinals	5–4 (10)				Busch Stadium	27,171	66–53
120	August 14	@ Cardinals	6–2				Busch Stadium	28,411	67–53
121	August 15	@ Rockies	2–6				Coors Field	48,308	67–54
122	August 16	@ Rockies	5–7				Coors Field	48,311	67–55
123	August 17	@ Rockies	4–6				Coors Field	48,440	67–56
124	August 19	Dodgers	2–4				**Shea Stadium**	25,971	67–57
–	August 20	Dodgers	Postponed (rain); rescheduled for August 21						
125	August 21 (1)	Dodgers	3–1				**Shea Stadium**	N/A	68–57
126	August 21 (2)	Dodgers	3–4				**Shea Stadium**	43,500	68–58
127	August 22	Padres	9–8 (11)				**Shea Stadium**	20,229	69–58
128	August 23	Padres	9–5				**Shea Stadium**	34,823	70–58
129	August 24	Padres	2–3				**Shea Stadium**	28,798	70–59
130	August 25	Giants	1–7				**Shea Stadium**	17,947	70–60
131	August 26	Giants	2–6				**Shea Stadium**	20,113	70–61
132	August 27	Giants	15–6				**Shea Stadium**	23,373	71–61
133	August 29	@ Orioles	3–4 (12)				Oriole Park at Camden Yards	48,022	71–62
134	August 30	@ Orioles	13–6				Oriole Park at Camden Yards	48,068	72–62
135	August 31	@ Orioles	4–1				Oriole Park at Camden Yards	48,075	73–62

September: (15–12) Home: 10–5; Away: 5–7

#	Date	Opponent	Score	Win	Loss	Save	Location	Attendance	Record
136	September 1	Blue Jays	3–0				**Shea Stadium**	19,196	74–62
137	September 2	Blue Jays	8–5				**Shea Stadium**	17,635	75–62
138	September 3	Blue Jays	4–2				**Shea Stadium**	14,513	76–62
139	September 5	@ Cubs	3–8				Wrigley Field	21,176	76–63
140	September 6	@ Cubs	5–7				Wrigley Field	38,849	76–64
141	September 7	@ Cubs	9–2				Wrigley Field	25,523	77–64
142	September 8	Phillies	4–13				**Shea Stadium**	13,321	77–65
143	September 9	Phillies	0–1				**Shea Stadium**	13,871	77–66
144	September 10	Phillies	10–2				**Shea Stadium**	13,257	78–66
145	September 11	Expos	9–5				**Shea Stadium**	13,271	79–66
146	September 12	Expos	2–3 (15)				**Shea Stadium**	17,450	79–67
147	September 13	Expos	9–6 (11)				**Shea Stadium**	24,208	80–67
148	September 14	Expos	1–0				**Shea Stadium**	43,575	81–67
149	September 15 (1)	@ Phillies	10–5 (10)				Veterans Stadium	N/A	82–67
150	September 15 (2)	@ Phillies	1–2				Veterans Stadium	14,416	82–68
151	September 16	@ Phillies	2–3				Veterans Stadium	16,585	82–69
152	September 17	@ Braves	2–10				Atlanta-Fulton County Stadium	40,974	82–70
153	September 18	@ Braves	4–11				Atlanta-Fulton County Stadium	41,373	82–71
154	September 19	@ Marlins	2–5				Pro Player Stadium	30,082	82–72
155	September 20	@ Marlins	7–3				Pro Player Stadium	40,882	83–72
156	September 21	@ Marlins	2–1				Pro Player Stadium	44,176	84–72
157	September 22	@ Marlins	10–3				Pro Player Stadium	29,234	85–72
158	September 23	Pirates	4–5				Shea Stadium	14,670	85–73
159	September 24	Pirates	7–5				**Shea Stadium**	13,195	86–73
160	September 26	Braves	6–7 (11)				**Shea Stadium**	21,864	86–74
161	September 27	Braves	2–1				**Shea Stadium**	31,472	87–74
162	September 28	Braves	8–2				**Shea Stadium**	27,176	88–74

== Roster ==
1997 New York Mets
Roster
Pitchers: 39 Juan Acevedo; 46 Brian Bohanon; 43 Toby Borland; 54 Mark Clark; 49 Joe Crawford; 31 John Franco; 27 Pete Harnisch; 44 Jason Isringhausen; 28 Bobby Jones; 48 Ricardo Jordan; 18 Takashi Kashiwada; 11 Cory Lidle; 26 Barry Manuel; 36 Greg McMichael; 38 Dave Mlicki; 25 Yorkis Pérez; 35 Rick Reed; 40 Armando Reynoso; 51 Mel Rojas; 50 Ricky Trlicek; 99 Turk Wendell	Catchers: 30 Alberto Castillo; 9 Todd Hundley; 43 Todd Pratt; Infielders: 6 Manny Alexander; 13 Edgardo Alfonzo; 8 Carlos Baerga; 15 Matt Franco; 12 Shawn Gilbert; 19 Jason Hardtke; 17 Luis López; 10 Kevin Morgan; 5 John Olerud; 0 Rey Ordóñez; 10 Roberto Petagine	Outfielders: 29 Steve Bieser; 3 Carl Everett; 23 Bernard Gilkey; 42 Butch Huskey; 1 Lance Johnson; 56 Brian McRae; 6 Carlos Mendoza; 22 Alex Ochoa; 10 Gary Thurman; 33 Andy Tomberlin	Manager: 2 Bobby Valentine; Coaches: 34 Bob Apodaca (pitching); 20 Bruce Benedict (bench); 52 Randy Niemann (bullpen); 53 Tom Robson (hitting); 4 Cookie Rojas (third base); 51 Mookie Wilson (first base)

== Player stats ==
=== Batting ===
==== Starters by position ====
Note: Pos = Position; G = Games played; AB = At bats; H = Hits; Avg. = Batting average; HR = Home runs; RBI = Runs batted in

Pos	Player	G	AB	H	Avg.	HR	RBI
C	Todd Hundley	132	417	114	.273	30	86
1B	John Olerud	154	524	154	.294	22	102
2B	Carlos Baerga	133	467	131	.281	9	52
SS	Rey Ordóñez	120	356	77	.216	1	33
3B	Edgardo Alfonzo	151	518	163	.315	10	72
LF	Bernard Gilkey	145	518	129	.249	18	78
CF	Lance Johnson	72	265	82	.309	1	24
RF	Butch Huskey	142	471	135	.287	24	81

==== Other batters ====
Note: G = Games played; AB = At bats; H = Hits; Avg. = Batting average; HR = Home runs; RBI = Runs batted in

Player	G	AB	H	Avg.	HR	RBI
Carl Everett	142	443	110	.248	14	57
Alex Ochoa	113	238	58	.244	3	22
Luis López	78	178	48	.270	1	19
Matt Franco	112	163	45	.276	5	21
Manny Alexander	54	149	37	.248	2	15
Brian McRae	45	145	36	.248	5	15
Todd Pratt	39	106	30	.283	2	19
Steve Bieser	47	69	17	.246	0	4
Alberto Castillo	35	59	12	.203	0	7
Jason Hardtke	30	56	15	.268	2	8
Shawn Gilbert	29	22	3	.136	1	1
Roberto Petagine	12	15	1	.067	0	2
Carlos Mendoza	15	12	3	.250	0	1
Andy Tomberlin	6	7	2	.286	0	0
Gary Thurman	11	6	1	.167	0	0
Kevin Morgan	1	1	0	.000	0	0

=== Pitching ===
==== Starting pitchers ====
Note; G = Games pitched; IP = Innings pitched; W = Wins; L = Losses; ERA = Earned run average; SO = Strikeouts

Player	G	IP	W	L	ERA	SO
Rick Reed	33	208.1	13	9	2.89	113
Dave Mlicki	32	193.2	8	12	4.00	157
Bobby Jones	30	193.1	15	9	3.63	125
Mark Clark	23	142.0	8	7	4.25	72
Brian Bohanon	19	94.1	6	4	3.82	66
Armando Reynoso	16	91.1	6	3	4.53	47
Jason Isringhausen	6	29.2	2	2	7.58	25

==== Other pitchers ====
Note; G = Games pitched; IP = Innings pitched; W = Wins; L = Losses; ERA = Earned run average; SO = Strikeouts

Player	G	IP	W	L	ERA	SO
Pete Harnisch	6	25.2	0	1	8.06	12

==== Relief pitchers ====
Note: G = Games pitched; W = Wins; L = Losses; SV = Saves; ERA = Earned run average; SO = Strikeouts

Player	G	W	L	SV	ERA	SO
John Franco	59	5	3	36	2.55	53
Greg McMichael	73	7	10	7	2.98	81
Cory Lidle	54	7	2	2	3.53	54
Takashi Kashiwada	35	3	1	0	4.31	19
Juan Acevedo	25	3	1	0	3.59	33
Mel Rojas	23	0	2	2	5.13	32
Ricardo Jordan	22	1	2	0	5.33	19
Joe Crawford	19	4	3	0	3.30	25
Barry Manuel	19	0	1	0	5.26	21
Turk Wendell	13	0	0	1	4.96	10
Toby Borland	13	0	1	1	6.08	7
Ricky Trlicek	9	0	0	0	8.00	4
Yorkis Pérez	9	0	1	0	8.31	7

== Awards and honors ==
All-Star Game

- Bobby Jones, Pitcher, Reserve
- Todd Hundley, Catcher, Reserve

== Farm system ==
Level	Team	League	Manager
AAA	Norfolk Tides	International League	Rick Dempsey
AA	Binghamton Mets	Eastern League	Rick Sweet
A	St. Lucie Mets	Florida State League	John Gibbons
A	Capital City Bombers	South Atlantic League	Doug Mansolino and John Stephenson
A-Short Season	Pittsfield Mets	New York–Penn League	Doug Davis
Rookie	Kingsport Mets	Appalachian League	Ken Berry
Rookie	GCL Mets	Gulf Coast League	Mickey Brantley and Doug Flynn

League champions: Pittsfield, GCL Mets
