= Ryan Nye =

American baseball player

- Pitcher
- Born: June 24, 1973 (age 53); Biloxi, Mississippi, U.S.
- Batted: Right Threw: Right

MLB debut
- June 7, 1997, for the Philadelphia Phillies

Last MLB appearance
- May 13, 1998, for the Philadelphia Phillies

MLB statistics
- Win–loss record: 0–2
- Earned run average: 9.69
- Strikeouts: 10
- Stats at Baseball Reference

Teams
- Philadelphia Phillies (1997–1998)

Ryan Craig Nye (born June 24, 1973) is an American former Major League Baseball pitcher who played for two seasons. He pitched for the Philadelphia Phillies for four games during the 1997 Philadelphia Phillies season and one game during the 1998 Philadelphia Phillies season.

== Early life and amateur career ==
Nye attended Cameron High School in Cameron, Oklahoma. He was high school teammates with his first cousin, Kevin Lomon. His younger brothers also played at Cameron and were selected in the 1993 and 1995 Major League Baseball drafts. As a senior in 1991, Nye threw at least two perfect games as a senior and, as of the start of that year's state tournament, had a 43–0 career win–loss record as a pitcher.

That June, Nye was drafted by the Seattle Mariners in the 43rd round of the 1991 Major League Baseball draft but chose not to sign. Nye instead followed Lomon to begin his college baseball career at Westark Community College. After one year at Westark, he was drafted again by the Mariners in the 22nd round of the 1992 draft but again did not sign. He next played at Texas Tech. In one season with the Red Raiders, he led the team in wins, innings pitched and earned run average. He was named First Team All-America by the National Collegiate Baseball Writers Association, the American Baseball Coaches Association and USA Today.

== Professional career ==
Nye was selected by the Philadelphia Phillies in the second round of the 1994 Major League Baseball draft and assigned to the Batavia Clippers to begin his professional career. The Phillies added Nye to their 40-man roster in November 1996.

Nye was scheduled to join the Phillies on June 2, 1997, and make his Major League debut. His debut was delayed, however, when that day's game was postponed due to rain. He instead made his debut on June 7 as the starting pitcher against the Pittsburgh Pirates at Three Rivers Stadium. He appeared in three more games before June 23 when he suffered an abdominal strain while warming up in the bullpen and was placed on the disabled list. On or about July 19, he was activated but sent to Triple-A. Nye made one appearance during the 1998 season, allowing three earned runs in one inning pitched. It would be his final game in Major League Baseball. A few days later, he was demoted to the minor leagues when Mark Portugal returned from injury.

Nye was on the disabled list for nearly two months at the start of the 1999 season due to a strained right shoulder. At some point prior to December 1999, he underwent arthroscopic shoulder surgery. Nye's final professional season came in 2000; he appeared in two games for the Gulf Coast League Phillies.
