= 1991 Major League Baseball draft =

Baseball draft of amateur players

General information
- Date: June 3, 1991
- Location: Conference call

Overview
- 1,301 total selections
- First selection: Brien Taylor; New York Yankees
- First round selections: 44
- Hall of Famers: 0

The 1991 Major League Baseball draft began 3 June 1991 to assign amateur baseball players to MLB teams. The draft order is the reverse order of the 1990 MLB season standings. In addition, compensation picks will be distributed for players who did not sign from the 1990 MLB Draft. The New York Yankees received the first overall selection.

Brien Taylor would become only the second top pick to fail to reach the major leagues, following Steve Chilcott of the 1966 draft.

== First round selections ==
The following are the first-round picks in the 1991 Major League Baseball draft.

†	= All-Star	= Baseball Hall of Famer

Pick	Player	Team	Position	Hometown/School
1	Brien Taylor	New York Yankees	Pitcher	East Carteret High School (NC)
2	Mike Kelly	Atlanta Braves	Outfielder	Arizona State
3	David McCarty	Minnesota Twins	First Baseman	Stanford
4	Dmitri Young †	St. Louis Cardinals	Third Baseman	Rio Mesa High School (CA)
5	Kenny Henderson	Milwaukee Brewers	Pitcher	Ringgold High School (GA)
6	John Burke	Houston Astros	Pitcher	Florida
7	Joe Vitiello	Kansas City Royals	Outfielder	Alabama
8	Joey Hamilton	San Diego Padres	Pitcher	Georgia Southern
9	Mark Smith	Baltimore Orioles	Outfielder	USC
10	Tyler Green †	Philadelphia Phillies	Pitcher	Wichita State
11	Shawn Estes †	Seattle Mariners	Pitcher	Douglas High School (NV)
12	Doug Glanville	Chicago Cubs	Outfielder	Pennsylvania
13	Manny Ramirez †	Cleveland Indians	Outfielder	George Washington High School (NY)
14	Cliff Floyd †	Montreal Expos	First Baseman	Thornwood High School (IL)
15	Tyrone Hill	Milwaukee Brewers (Note: Compensation pick from the Detroit Tigers for signing Rob Deer)	Pitcher	Yucaipa High School (CA)
16	Shawn Green †	Toronto Blue Jays (Note: Compensation pick from the San Francisco Giants for signing Bud Black)	Outfielder	Tustin High School (CA)
17	Eduardo Pérez	California Angels	First Baseman	Florida State
18	Al Shirley	New York Mets (Note: Compensation pick from the Los Angeles Dodgers for signing Darryl Strawberry)	Outfielder	George Washington High School (VA)
19	Benji Gil	Texas Rangers	Shortstop	Castle Park High School (CA)
20	Pokey Reese	Cincinnati Reds	Shortstop	Lower Richland High School (SC)
21	Allen Watson	St. Louis Cardinals (Note: Compensation pick from the Toronto Blue Jays for signing Ken Dayley)	Pitcher	New York Institute of Technology
22	Brian Barber	St. Louis Cardinals (Note: Compensation pick from the New York Mets for signing Vince Coleman)	Pitcher	Dr. Phillips High School (FL)
23	Aaron Sele †	Boston Red Sox	Pitcher	Washington State
24	Jon Farrell	Pittsburgh Pirates	Catcher	Florida Junior College
25	Scott Ruffcorn	Chicago White Sox	Pitcher	Baylor
26	Brent Gates	Oakland Athletics	Shortstop	Minnesota

== Supplemental first round selections ==
Pick	Player	Team	Position	Hometown/School
27	Scott Stahoviak	Minnesota Twins (Note: Supplemental pick for loss of free agent Gary Gaetti)	Third Baseman	Creighton
28	Tom McKinnon	Saint Louis Cardinals (Note: Supplemental pick for loss of free agent Terry Pendleton)	Pitcher	Jordan High School (CA)
29	Shawn Livsey	Houston Astros (Note: Supplemental pick for loss of free agent Danny Darwin)	Shortstop	Simeon High School (IL)
30	Jason Pruitt	Kansas City Royals (Note: Supplemental pick for loss of free agent Steve Farr)	Pitcher	Rockingham County High School (NC)
31	Greg Anthony	San Diego Padres (Note: Supplemental pick for loss of free agent Jack Clark)	Pitcher	Tavares High School (FL)
32	Justin Thompson †	Detroit Tigers (Note: Supplemental pick for loss of free agent Jack Morris)	Pitcher	Klein Oak High School (TX)
33	Steve Whitaker	San Francisco Giants (Note: Supplemental pick for loss of free agent Brett Butler)	Pitcher	Long Beach State
34	Jorge Fábregas	California Angels (Note: Supplemental pick for loss of free agent Chili Davis)	Third Baseman	Miami (FL)
35	Jeff Ware	Toronto Blue Jays (Note: Supplemental pick for loss of free agent George Bell)	Pitcher	Old Dominion
36	Bobby Jones †	New York Mets (Note: Supplemental pick for loss of free agent Darryl Strawberry)	Pitcher	Fresno State
37	J.J. Johnson	Boston Red Sox (Note: Supplemental pick for loss of free agent Larry Andersen)	Outfielder	Pine Plains High School (NY)
38	Mike Rossiter	Oakland Athletics (Note: Supplemental pick for loss of free agent Willie McGee)	Pitcher	Burroughs High School (CA)
39	Dan Cholowsky	St. Louis Cardinals (Note: Supplemental pick for loss of free agent Ken Dayley)	Third Baseman	California
40	Jim Gonzalez	Houston Astros	Catcher	East Hartford High School (CT)
41	Trever Miller	Detroit Tigers (Note: Supplemental pick for loss of free agent Mike Heath)	Pitcher	Trinity High School (KY)
42	Dante Powell	Toronto Blue Jays (Note: Supplemental pick for loss of free agent Buddy Black)	Outfield	Millikan High School (CA)
43	Scott Hatteberg	Boston Red Sox	Catcher	Washington State
44	Mike Groppuso	Houston Astros (Note: Supplemental pick for loss of free agent Franklin Stubbs)	Third Baseman	Seton Hall

== Other notable players ==
- Kevin Stocker, 2nd round, 54th overall by the Philadelphia Phillies
- Herbert Perry, 2nd round, 57th overall by the Cleveland Indians
- Tarrik Brock, 2nd round, 59th overall by the Detroit Tigers
- Terrell Lowery, 2nd round, 63rd overall by the Texas Rangers
- Brian Edmondson, 3rd round, 78th overall by the Detroit Tigers via the Milwaukee Brewers
- Todd Hollandsworth, 3rd round, 80th overall by the Los Angeles Dodgers
- Antone Williamson, 3rd round, 81st overall by the San Diego Padres
- Alex Ochoa, 3rd round, 82nd overall by the Baltimore Orioles
- Jim Mecir, 3rd round, 84th overall by the Seattle Mariners
- Chad Ogea, 3rd round, 86th overall by the Cleveland Indians
- Chris Stynes, 3rd round, 94th overall by the Toronto Blue Jays
- Sean Mulligan, 4th round, 107th overall by the San Diego Padres
- Desi Relaford, 4th round, 110th overall by the Seattle Mariners
- Terry Adams, 4th round, 111th overall by the Chicago Cubs
- Paul Byrd, 4th round, 112th overall by the Cleveland Indians
- Sean Bergman, 4th round, 114th overall by the Detroit Tigers
- Brian Boehringer, 4th round, 124th overall by the Chicago White Sox
- Nomar Garciaparra, 5th round, 130th overall by the Milwaukee Brewers, but did not sign
- Joey Long, 5th round, 133rd overall by the San Diego Padres
- Ozzie Timmons, 5th round, 137th overall by the Chicago Cubs
- Dave Kennedy, 5th round, 142nd overall by the California Angles
- John Mabry, 6th round, 155th overall by the St. Louis Cardinals
- Derrick White, 6th round, 165th overall by the Montreal Expos
- LaTroy Hawkins, 7th round, 180th overall by the Minnesota Twins
- Homer Bush, 7th round, 185th overall by the San Diego Padres
- Pep Harris, 7th round, 190th overall by the Cleveland Indians
- Chris Turner, 7th round, 194th overall by the California Angels
- Tony Womack, 7th round, 201st overall by the Pittsburgh Pirates
- Jason Schmidt, 8th round, 205th overall by the Atlanta Braves
- Brad Radke, 8th round, 206th overall by the Minnesota Twins
- Mike Matheny, 8th round, 208th overall by the Milwaukee Brewers
- Derek Lowe, 8th round, 214th overall by the Seattle Mariners
- Steve Trachsel, 8th round, 215th overall by the Chicago Cubs
- John Courtright, 8th round, 223rd overall by the Cincinnati Reds
- Jon Lieber, 9th round, 241st overall by the Chicago Cubs, but did not sign
- Clint Sodowsky, 9th round, 244th overall by the Detroit Tigers
- Mark Sweeney, 9th round, 246th overall by the California Angels
- Scott Eyre, 9th round, 248th overall by the Texas Rangers
- Mike Sweeney, 10th round, 262nd overall by the Kansas City Royals
- Brian Looney, 10th round, 269th overall by the Montreal Expos
- Jeff Cirillo, 11th round, 286th overall by the Milwaukee Brewers
- Sam Wood, 11th round, 290th overall by the Houston Astros
- Joe Randa, 11th round, 288th overall by the Kansas City Royals
- Mark Grudzielanek, 11th round, 295th overall by the Montreal Expos
- Al Levine, 11th round, 306th overall by the Chicago White Sox
- Mike Fyhrie, 12th round, 314th overall by the Kansas City Royals
- Curtis Goodwin, 12th round, 316th overall by the Baltimore Orioles
- Jason Jacome, 12th round, 329th overall by the New York Mets
- Doug Brady, 12th round, 332nd overall by the Chicago White Sox
- Miguel Jimenez, 12th round, 333rd overall by the Oakland Athletics
- Matt Lawton, 13th round, 336th overall by the Minnesota Twins
- Rod Myers, 13th round, 340th overall by the Kansas City Royals
- Alex Gonzalez, 13th round, 354th overall by the Toronto Blue Jays
- Mike Heathcott, 13th round, 358th overall by the Chicago White Sox
- Kevin Lomon, 14th round, 361st overall by the Atlanta Braves
- Mike Busby, 14th round, 363rd overall by the St. Louis Cardinals
- Brian Koelling, 14th round, 379th overall by the Cincinnati Reds
- Darrell May, 14th round, 385th overall by the Oakland Athletics, but did not sign
- Justin Atchley, 15th round, 393rd overall by the San Diego Padres, but did not sign
- Phil Stidham, 15th round, 400th overall by the Detroit Tigers
- Kerry Lacy, 15th round, 404th overall by the Texas Rangers
- Cory Bailey, 15th round, 408th overall by the Boston Red Sox
- Brent Cookson, 15th round, 411th overall by the Oakland Athletics
- Brad Rigby, 17th round, 438th overall by the New York Yankees, but did not sign
- Frank Charles, 17th round, 453rd overall by the San Francisco Giants
- Shad Williams, 17th round, 454th overall by the California Angels
- Chad Zerbe, 17th round, 455th overall by the Los Angeles Dodgers
- Joe Crawford, 17th round, 459th overall by the New York Mets
- Tim Van Egmond, 17th round, 460th overall by the Boston Red Sox
- Bobby Higginson, 18th round, 473rd overall by the Philadelphia Phillies, but did not sign
- Kirk Rueter, 18th round, 477th overall by the Montreal Expos
- Ron Mahay, 18th round, 486th overall by the Boston Red Sox
- Mike Cameron, 18th round, 488th overall by the Chicago White Sox
- Charlie Greene, 19th round, 497th overall by the San Diego Padres
- Rick Gorecki, 19th round, 507th overall by the Los Angeles Dodgers
- Marc Pisciotta, 19th round, 513rd overall by the Pittsburgh Pirates
- Albie Lopez, 20th round, 528th overall by the Cleveland Indians
- Ben Weber, 20th round, 536th overall by the Toronto Blue Jays
- Chris Clemons, 21st round, 553rd overall by the Chicago Cubs, but did not sign
- Jed Hansen, 21st round, 554th overall by the Cleveland Indians, but did not sign
- George Arias, 21st round, 557th overall by the San Francisco Giants, but did not sign
- Kevin Jarvis, 21st round, 561st overall by the Cincinnati Reds
- Joel Bennett, 21st round, 564th overall by the Boston Red Sox
- Ryan Karp, 22nd round, 569th overall by the Atlanta Braves, but did not sign
- Darren Bragg, 22nd round, 578th overall by the Seattle Mariners
- Ken Huckaby, 22nd round, 585th overall by the Los Angeles Dodgers
- Rick Krivda, 23rd round, 602nd overall by the Baltimore Orioles
- Craig Wilson, 23rd round, 609th overall by the San Francisco Giants, but did not sign
- John Frascatore, 24th round, 623rd overall by the St. Louis Cardinals
- Dean Crow, 24th round, 644th overall by the Chicago White Sox, but did not sign
- George Williams, 24th round, 645th overall by the Oakland Athletics
- Jose Flores, 25th round, 651st overall by the Houston Astros, but did not sign
- Les Norman, 25th round, 652nd overall by the Kansas City Royals
- Matt Mantei, 25th round, 656th overall by the Seattle Mariners
- Ryan Franklin, 25th round, 666th overall by the Toronto Blue Jays, but did not sign
- Pedro Swann, 26th round, 673rd overall by the Atlanta Braves
- Rigo Beltrán, 26th round, 675th overall by the St. Louis Cardinals
- Bob Henley, 26th round, 685th overall by the Montreal Expos
- Curt Schmidt, 28th round, 733rd overall by the Philadelphia Phillies, but did not sign
- Steve Sinclair, 28th round, 744th overall by the Toronto Blue Jays
- Fred Rath Jr., 29th round, 750th overall by the New York Yankees, but did not sign
- Bryan Ward, 29th round, 757th overall by the San Diego Padres, but did not sign
- Mark Lukasiewicz, 29th round, 771st overall by the New York Mets, but did not sign
- Kevin Morgan, 30th round, 790th overall by the Detroit Tigers
- Desi Wilson, 30th round, 794th overall by the Texas Rangers
- Mike Bertotti, 31st round, 826th overall by the Chicago White Sox
- Bob Howry, 32nd round, 833rd overall by the Houston Astros, but did not sign
- George Glinatsis, 32nd round, 838th overall by the Seattle Mariners
- Robin Jennings, 33rd round, 865th overall by the Chicago Cubs, but did not sign
- Orlando Palmeiro, 33rd round, 870th overall by the California Angels
- J. J. Thobe, 33rd round, 872nd overall by the Texas Rangers, but did not sign
- Tim Davis, 34th round, 882nd overall by the Minnesota Twins, but did not sign
- T. J. Mathews, 38th round, 986th overall by the Minnesota Twins, but did not sign
- Rich Loiselle, 38th round, 991st overall by the San Diego Padres
- Alvin Morman, 39th round, 1015th overall by the Houston Astros
- Dustin Hermanson, 39th round, 1033rd overall by the Pittsburgh Pirates, but did not sign
- Mike Metcalfe, 40th round, 1041st overall by the Houston Astros, but did not sign
- Stephen Larkin, 40th round, 1055th overall by the Cincinnati Reds, but did not sign
- John Dettmer, 41st round, 1068th overall by the San Diego Padres, but did not sign
- Aaron Fultz, 41st round, 1080th overall by the Cincinnati Reds, but did not sign
- Ryan Nye, 43rd round, 1121st overall by the Seattle Mariners, but did not sign
- Aaron Boone, 43rd round, 1127th overall by the California Angels, but did not sign
- Bobby Jones, 44th round, 1140th overall by the Milwaukee Brewers, but did not sign
- Damian Jackson, 44th round, 1148th overall by the Cleveland Indians
- Jason Isringhausen, 44th round, 1157th overall by the New York Mets
- Bronson Heflin, 45th round, 1161st overall by the New York Yankees, but did not sign
- Jacob Cruz, 45th round, 1177th overall by the California Angels, but did not sign
- Bobby Hughes, 47th round, 1225th overall by the Detroit Tigers, but did not sign
- Steve Bourgeois, 49th round, 1268th overall by the Cleveland Indians, but did not sign
- Todd Walker, 51st round, 1316th overall by the Texas Rangers, but did not sign
- Ken Grundt, 53rd round, 1354th overall by the San Francisco Giants
- Raúl Ibañez, 54th round, 1375th overall by the Texas Rangers, but did not sign
- Jason Beverlin, 55th round, 1386th overall by the Seattle Mariners, but did not sign
- Trey Moore, 55th round, 1392nd overall by the Texas Rangers, but did not sign
- Lou Collier, 56th round, 1399th overall by the Houston Astros, but did not sign
- Jim Brower, 56th round, 1410th overall by the Pittsburgh Pirates, but did not sign
- Andy Abad, 57th round, 1415th overall by the Houston Astros, but did not sign
- Paul Wilson, 57th round, 1426th overall by the Pittsburgh Pirates, but did not sign
- Steve Kline, 60th round, 1463rd overall by the Los Angeles Dodgers
- Jay Witasick, 63rd round, 1492nd overall by the Houston Astros, but did not sign
- Charles Gipson, 63rd round, 1493rd overall by the Seattle Mariners, but did not sign
- Scott Watkins, 70th round, 1538th overall by the Montreal Expos, but did not sign

=== NFL players drafted ===
- Tony Banks, 10th round, 258th overall by the Minnesota Twins
- Rob Johnson, 16th round, 414th overall by the Minnesota Twins, but did not sign
- Frank Sanders, 26th round, 683rd overall by the Chicago Cubs, but did not sign
- Steve McNair, 35th round, 916th overall by the Seattle Mariners, but did not sign
- Rodney Williams, 37th round, 964th overall by the Kansas City Royals
- O. J. McDuffie, 41st round, 1077th overall by the California Angels, but did not sign
- Mark Fields, 51st round, 1309th overall by the Seattle Mariners, but did not sign

Preceded by Chipper Jones	1st Overall Picks; Brien Taylor	Succeeded by Phil Nevin
