= 1997 Florida Marlins season =

Major League Baseball season

1997 Florida Marlins
- World Series champions National League champions National League Wild Card winners
- League: National League
- Division: East
- Ballpark: Pro Player Stadium
- City: Miami Gardens, Florida
- Record: 92–70 (.568)
- Divisional place: 2nd
- Owners: Wayne Huizenga
- General managers: Dave Dombrowski
- Managers: Jim Leyland
- Television: Sunshine Network/Sports Channel Florida; WBFS-TV (Tommy Hutton, Joe Angel, Dave O'Brien, Jay Randolph)
- Radio: WQAM (Joe Angel, Dave O'Brien, Jon Sciambi); WCMQ-FM (Spanish) (Felo Ramírez, Manolo Alvarez)

The 1997 Florida Marlins season was the fifth season for the Major League Baseball (MLB) franchise in the National League. It would begin with the team attempting to improve on their season from 1996. Their manager was Jim Leyland. They played home games at Pro Player Stadium. They finished with a record of 92–70, posting the first winning season in franchise history and winning the NL Wild Card. They got through the National League playoffs and won the World Series over the Cleveland Indians. They are the 1st MLB Wild Card team to win a World Series.

== Offseason ==
- November 22, 1996: Bobby Bonilla was signed as a free agent with the Florida Marlins.
- March 26, 1997: Cliff Floyd was traded by the Montreal Expos to the Florida Marlins for Dustin Hermanson and Joe Orsulak.

== Regular season ==
=== Season standings ===
NL East
Team	W	L	Pct.	GB	Home	Road
Atlanta Braves	101	61	.623	—	50‍–‍31	51‍–‍30
Florida Marlins	92	70	.568	9	52‍–‍29	40‍–‍41
New York Mets	88	74	.543	13	50‍–‍31	38‍–‍43
Montreal Expos	78	84	.481	23	45‍–‍36	33‍–‍48
Philadelphia Phillies	68	94	.420	33	38‍–‍43	30‍–‍51

=== Record vs. opponents ===
1997 National League record Source: MLB Standings Grid – 1997
Team	ATL	CHC	CIN	COL	FLA	HOU	LAD	MON	NYM	PHI	PIT	SD	SF	STL	AL
Atlanta	—	9–2	9–2	5–6	4–8	7–4	6–5	10–2	5–7	10–2	5–6	8–3	7–4	8–3	8–7
Chicago	2–9	—	7–5	2–9	2–9	3–9	5–6	4–7	6–5	6–5	7–5	6–5	5–6	4–8	9–6
Cincinnati	2–9	5–7	—	5–6	5–6	5–7	6–5	6–5	2–9	8–3	8–4	5–6	4–7	6–6	9–6
Colorado	6–5	9–2	6–5	—	7–4	5–6	5–7	7–4	6–5	4–7	4–7	4–8	4–8	7–4	9–7
Florida	8–4	9–2	6–5	4–7	—	7–4	7–4	7–5	4–8	6–6	7–4	5–6	5–6	5–6	12–3
Houston	4–7	9–3	7–5	6–5	4–7	—	7–4	8–3	7–4	4–7	6–6	6–5	3–8	9–3	4–11
Los Angeles	5–6	6–5	5–6	7–5	4–7	4–7	—	7–4	6–5	10–1	9–2	5–7	6–6	5–6	9–7
Montreal	2–10	7–4	5–6	4–7	5–7	3–8	4–7	—	5–7	6–6	5–6	8–3	6–5	6–5	12–3
New York	7–5	5–6	9–2	5–6	8–4	4–7	5–6	7–5	—	7–5	7–4	5–6	3–8	9–2	7–8
Philadelphia	2–10	5–6	3–8	7–4	6–6	7–4	1–10	6–6	5–7	—	5–6	7–4	3–8	6–5	5–10
Pittsburgh	6–5	5–7	4–8	7–4	4–7	6–6	2–9	6–5	4–7	6–5	—	5–6	8–3	9–3	7–8
San Diego	3–8	5–6	6–5	8–4	6–5	5–6	7–5	3–8	6–5	4–7	6–5	—	4–8	5–6	8–8
San Francisco	4–7	6–5	7–4	8–4	6–5	8–3	6–6	5–6	8–3	8–3	3–8	8–4	—	3–8	10–6
St. Louis	3–8	8–4	6–6	4–7	6–5	3–9	6–5	5–6	2–9	5–6	3–9	6–5	8–3	—	8–7

=== Transactions ===
- July 21, 1997: Darren Daulton was traded by the Philadelphia Phillies to the Florida Marlins for Billy McMillon.
- July 27, 1997: Craig Counsell was traded by the Colorado Rockies to the Florida Marlins for Mark Hutton.
- July 29, 1997: Matt Treanor was traded by the Kansas City Royals to the Florida Marlins for Matt Whisenant.

=== Roster ===
1997 Florida Marlins
Roster
Pitchers: 57 Antonio Alfonseca; 27 Kevin Brown; 42 Dennis Cook; 32 Alex Fernandez; 33 Rick Helling; 49 Félix Heredia; 61 Liván Hernández; 52 Mark Hutton; 25 Al Leiter; 35 Kurt Miller; 31 Robb Nen; 33 Kirt Ojala; 46 Donn Pall; 39 Jay Powell; 48 Pat Rapp; 41 Tony Saunders; 38 Rob Stanifer; 52 Ed Vosberg; 30 Matt Whisenant	Catchers: 23 Charles Johnson; 13 Bob Natal; 9 Gregg Zaun; Infielders: 7 Kurt Abbott; 26 Alex Arias; 24 Bobby Bonilla; 2 Josh Booty; 1 Luis Castillo; 19 Jeff Conine; 30 Craig Counsell; 20 Darren Daulton; 21 Ralph Milliard; 16,3 Édgar Rentería	Outfielders: 18 Moisés Alou; 28 John Cangelosi; 17 Todd Dunwoody; 8 Jim Eisenreich; 15 Cliff Floyd; 4 Mark Kotsay; 40 Billy McMillon; 43 Russ Morman; 10 Gary Sheffield; 14 John Wehner; 22 Devon White	Manager: 11 Jim Leyland; Coaches: 45 Rich Donnelly (3rd Base); 12 Bruce Kimm (Bullpen); 6 Jerry Manuel (Bench); 29 Milt May (Hitting); 47 Larry Rothschild (Pitching); 37 Tommy Sandt (1st Base)

== Player stats ==
= Indicates team leader

=== Batting ===
==== Starters by position ====
Note: Pos = Position; G = Games played; AB = At bats; R = Runs scored; H = Hits; Avg. = Batting average; HR = Home runs; RBI = Runs batted in; SB = Stolen bases

Pos	Player	G	AB	R	H	Avg.	HR	RBI	SB
C	Charles Johnson	124	416	43	104	.250	19	63	0
1B	Jeff Conine	151	405	46	98	.242	17	61	2
2B	Luis Castillo	75	263	27	63	.240	0	8	16
3B	Bobby Bonilla	153	562	77	167	.297	17	96	6
SS	Édgar Rentería	154	617	90	171	.277	4	52	32
LF	Moisés Alou	150	538	88	157	.292	23	115	9
CF	Devon White	74	265	37	65	.245	6	34	13
RF	Gary Sheffield	135	444	86	111	.250	21	71	11

==== Other batters ====
Note: G = Games played; AB = At bats; R = Runs scored; H = Hits; Avg. = Batting average; HR = Home runs; RBI = Runs batted in; SB = Stolen bases

Player	G	AB	R	H	Avg.	HR	RBI	SB
Jim Eisenreich	120	293	36	82	.280	2	34	0
Kurt Abbott	94	252	35	69	.274	6	30	3
John Cangelosi	103	192	28	47	.245	1	12	5
Craig Counsell	51	164	20	49	.299	1	16	1
Greg Zaun	58	143	21	43	.301	2	20	1
Cliff Floyd	61	137	23	32	.234	6	19	6
Darren Daulton	52	126	22	33	.262	3	21	2
Alex Arias	74	93	13	23	.247	1	11	0
Mark Kotsay	14	52	5	10	.192	0	4	3
Todd Dunwoody	19	50	7	13	.260	2	7	2
John Wehner	44	36	8	10	.278	0	2	1
Ralph Milliard	8	30	2	6	.200	0	2	1
Billy McMillon	13	18	0	2	.111	0	1	0
Russ Morman	4	7	3	2	.286	1	2	1
Josh Booty	4	5	2	3	.600	0	1	0
Bob Natal	4	4	2	2	.500	1	3	0

=== Pitching ===
==== Starting pitchers ====
Note: G = Games pitched; GS = Games started; IP = Innings pitched; W = Wins; L = Losses; ERA = Earned run average; SO = Strikeouts

Player	G	GS	IP	W	L	ERA	SO
Kevin Brown	33	33	237.1	16	8	2.69	205
Alex Fernandez	32	32	220.2	17	12	3.59	183
Al Leiter	27	27	151.1	11	9	4.34	132
Tony Saunders	22	21	111.1	4	6	4.61	102
Pat Rapp	19	19	108.2	4	6	4.47	64
Liván Hernández	17	17	96.1	9	3	3.18	72

==== Other pitchers ====
Note: G = Games pitched; IP = Innings pitched; W = Wins; L = Losses; ERA = Earned run average; SO = Strikeouts

Player	G	GS	IP	W	L	ERA	SO
Rick Helling	31	8	76.0	2	6	4.38	53
Kirt Ojala	7	5	28.2	1	2	3.14	19

==== Relief pitchers ====
Note: G = Games pitched; W = Wins; L = Losses; SV = Saves; ERA = Earned run average; SO = Strikeouts

Player	G	W	L	SV	ERA	SO
Robb Nen	73	9	3	35	3.89	81
Jay Powell	74	7	2	2	3.28	65
Dennis Cook	59	1	2	0	3.90	63
Félix Heredia	56	5	3	0	4.29	54
Rob Stanifer	36	1	2	1	4.60	28
Mark Hutton	32	3	1	0	3.78	29
Antonio Alfonseca	17	1	3	0	4.91	19
Ed Vosberg	17	1	1	1	3.75	8
Kurt Miller	7	0	1	0	9.82	7
Matt Whisenant	4	0	0	0	16.88	4
Donn Pall	2	0	0	0	3.86	0
John Cangelosi	1	0	0	0	0.00	0

== Postseason ==
=== NLDS ===
Florida wins the series, 3-0

Game	Home	Score	Visitor	Score	Date	Series
1	Florida	2	San Francisco	1	September 30	1-0 (FLA)
2	Florida	7	San Francisco	6	October 1	2-0 (FLA)
3	San Francisco	2	Florida	6	October 3	3-0 (FLA)

=== NLCS ===
Game	Date	Visitor	Score	Home	Score	Record (FLA-ATL)	Attendance
1	October 7	Florida	5	Atlanta	3	1-0	49,244
2	October 8	Florida	1	Atlanta	7	1-1	48,933
3	October 10	Atlanta	2	Florida	5	2-1	53,857
4	October 11	Atlanta	4	Florida	0	2-2	54,890
5	October 12	Atlanta	1	Florida	2	3-2	46,496
6	October 14	Florida	7	Atlanta	4	4-2	50,466
Florida wins series 4–2 and advance to the World Series

=== World Series ===
==== Game 1 ====
October 18, 1997, at Pro Player Stadium in Miami

Team	1	2	3	4	5	6	7	8	9	R	H	E
Cleveland	1	0	0	0	1	1	0	1	0	4	11	0
Florida	0	0	1	4	2	0	0	0	x	7	7	1
WP: Liván Hernández (1-0) LP: Orel Hershiser (0-1) Sv: Robb Nen (1); Home runs: CLE: Manny Ramírez (1), Jim Thome (1); FLA: Moisés Alou (1), Charles Johnson (1)

==== Game 2 ====
October 19, 1997, at Pro Player Stadium in Miami

Team	1	2	3	4	5	6	7	8	9	R	H	E
Cleveland	1	0	0	0	3	2	0	0	0	6	14	0
Florida	1	0	0	0	0	0	0	0	0	1	8	0
WP: Chad Ogea (1-0) LP: Kevin Brown (0-1); Home runs: CLE: Sandy Alomar Jr. (1); FLA: None

==== Game 3 ====
October 21, 1997, at Jacobs Field in Cleveland, Ohio

Team	1	2	3	4	5	6	7	8	9	R	H	E
Florida	1	0	1	1	0	2	2	0	7	14	16	3
Cleveland	2	0	0	3	2	0	0	0	4	11	10	3
WP: Dennis Cook (1-0) LP: Eric Plunk (0-1) Sv: Robb Nen (2); Home runs: FLA: Gary Sheffield (1), Darren Daulton (1), Jim Eisenreich (1); CLE: Jim Thome (2)

==== Game 4 ====
October 22, 1997, at Jacobs Field in Cleveland, Ohio

Team	1	2	3	4	5	6	7	8	9	R	H	E
Florida	0	0	0	1	0	2	0	0	0	3	6	2
Cleveland	3	0	3	0	0	1	1	2	X	10	15	0
WP: Jaret Wright (1-0) LP: Tony Saunders (0-1); Home runs: FLA: Moisés Alou (2); CLE: Manny Ramírez (2), Matt Williams (1)

==== Game 5 ====
October 23, 1997, at Jacobs Field in Cleveland, Ohio

Team	1	2	3	4	5	6	7	8	9	R	H	E
Florida	0	2	0	0	0	4	0	1	1	8	15	2
Cleveland	0	1	3	0	0	0	0	0	3	7	9	0
WP: Liván Hernández (2-0) LP: Orel Hershiser (0-2) Sv: Robb Nen (3); Home runs: FLA: Moisés Alou (3); CLE: Sandy Alomar Jr. (2)

==== Game 6 ====
October 25, 1997, at Pro Player Stadium in Miami

Team	1	2	3	4	5	6	7	8	9	R	H	E
Cleveland	0	2	0	1	0	1	0	0	0	4	7	0
Florida	0	0	0	0	1	0	0	0	0	1	8	0
WP: Chad Ogea (2-0) LP: Kevin Brown (0-2) Sv: José Mesa (1)

==== Game 7 ====
October 26, 1997, at Pro Player Stadium in Miami

Team	1	2	3	4	5	6	7	8	9	10	11	R	H	E
Cleveland	0	0	2	0	0	0	0	0	0	0	0	2	6	2
Florida	0	0	0	0	0	0	1	0	1	0	1	3	8	0
WP: Jay Powell (1-0) LP: Charles Nagy (0-1); Home runs: CLE: None; FLA: Bobby Bonilla (1)

== Awards and honors ==
- Darren Daulton, National League Comeback Player of the Year
- Liván Hernández, NLCS MVP
- Liván Hernández, World Series MVP

1997 Major League Baseball All-Star Game

- Moisés Alou, reserve
- Kevin Brown, reserve
- Charles Johnson, reserve

== Farm system ==
Level	Team	League	Manager
AAA	Charlotte Knights	International League	Carlos Tosca
AA	Portland Sea Dogs	Eastern League	Fredi González
A	Brevard County Manatees	Florida State League	Lorenzo Bundy
A	Kane County Cougars	Midwest League	Lynn Jones
A-Short Season	Utica Blue Sox	New York–Penn League	Juan Bustabad
Rookie	GCL Marlins	Gulf Coast League	Jon Deeble
