= 2004 Haarlem Baseball Week =

Tournament details
- Country: Netherlands
- City: Haarlem
- Dates: 23 July – 1 August
- Teams: 6

Final positions
- Champions: Netherlands (1st title)
- Runners-up: Cuba
- Third place: Japan
- Fourth place: Chinese Taipei

Awards
- MVP: (Netherlands) Johnny Balentina

The 2004 Haarlem Baseball Week was an international baseball competition held at the Pim Mulier Stadium in Haarlem, the Netherlands from July 23 to August 1, 2004. It was the 22nd edition of the tournament and featured teams from Chinese Taipei, Cuba, Italy, Japan, the Netherlands and the United States.

The Netherlands won the tournament for the first time.

== Group stage ==
=== Standings ===
Qualified for the final
Did not qualify for the final

#	Team	Games	Wins	Losses
1	Cuba	5	4	1
2	Netherlands	5	3	2
3	Japan	5	3	2
4	Chinese Taipei	5	2	3
5	Italy	5	2	3
6	United States	5	1	4

^1 Chinese Taipei is the official IBAF designation for the team representing the state officially referred to as the Republic of China, more commonly known as Taiwan. (See also political status of Taiwan for details.)
^2 The United States were represented by a semi-pro unaffiliated baseball team from Reno, Nevada named the Reno Astros.

=== Game results ===
July 23, 2004	Chinese Taipei	2 – 3	United States	Haarlem, Netherlands

July 24, 2004	Cuba	1 – 10	Japan	Haarlem, Netherlands

July 24, 2004	Netherlands	9 – 1	Chinese Taipei	Haarlem, Netherlands

July 25, 2004	Japan	3 – 5	Netherlands	Haarlem, Netherlands

July 25, 2004	Italy	8 – 0	United States	Haarlem, Netherlands

July 26, 2004	Italy	3 – 5	Cuba	Haarlem, Netherlands

July 27, 2004	Cuba	4 – 1	Chinese Taipei	Haarlem, Netherlands

July 27, 2004	United States	5 – 7	Japan	Haarlem, Netherlands

July 28, 2004	Japan	2 – 3	Chinese Taipei	Haarlem, Netherlands

July 28, 2004	Netherlands	1 – 3	Italy	Haarlem, Netherlands

July 29, 2004	Italy	2 – 9	Netherlands	Haarlem, Netherlands

July 29, 2004	United States	1 – 4	Cuba	Haarlem, Netherlands

July 30, 2004	Chinese Taipei	6 – 1	Italy	Haarlem, Netherlands

July 30, 2004	Cuba	5 – 0	Netherlands	Haarlem, Netherlands

July 31, 2004	Italy	1 – 7	Japan	Haarlem, Netherlands

July 31, 2004	Netherlands	6 – 0	United States	Haarlem, Netherlands

^3 Regarding a benefit game, the results didn't affect the standings.

== Final ==
August 1, 2004	Cuba	1 – 3	Netherlands	Haarlem, Netherlands

== Final standings ==
Rk	Team
1	Netherlands
Lost in final
2	Cuba
Failed to qualify for the Final
3	Japan
4	Chinese Taipei
5	Italy
6	United States

2004 Haarlem Baseball Week champions

Netherlands
1st title

== Awards ==
Most valuable player	(Netherlands) Johnny Balentina
Best pitcher	(Netherlands) Calvin Maduro
Best hitter	(Italy) Davide Dallospedale
Outstanding defensive player	(Netherlands) Ralph Milliard
Home run king	(Chinese Taipei) Hsin-Ming Wang
Most popular player	(Netherlands) Dirk van 't Klooster
