= Ricky Bottalico =

American baseball player (born 1969)

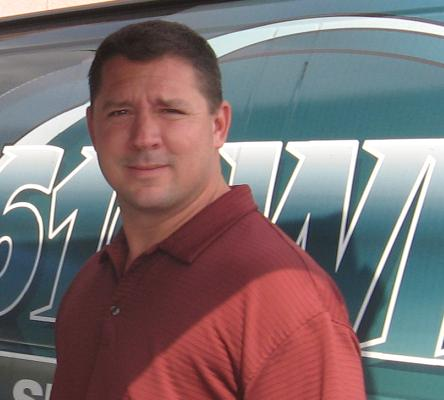
- Bottalico in 2009
- Pitcher
- Born: August 26, 1969 (age 57); New Britain, Connecticut, U.S.
- Batted: Left Threw: Right

MLB debut
- July 29, 1994, for the Philadelphia Phillies

Last MLB appearance
- July 22, 2005, for the Milwaukee Brewers

MLB statistics
- Win–loss record: 33–42
- Earned run average: 3.99
- Strikeouts: 575
- Saves: 116
- Stats at Baseball Reference

Teams
- Philadelphia Phillies (1994–1998); St. Louis Cardinals (1999); Kansas City Royals (2000); Philadelphia Phillies (2001–2002); Arizona Diamondbacks (2003); New York Mets (2004); Milwaukee Brewers (2005)

Career highlights and awards
- All-Star (1996)

Ricky Bottalico (/bəˈtælɪkoʊ/; born August 26, 1969) is an American former professional baseball right-handed relief pitcher, who played in Major League Baseball (MLB) for the Philadelphia Phillies, St. Louis Cardinals, Kansas City Royals, Arizona Diamondbacks, New York Mets, and Milwaukee Brewers. He compiled a career 3.99 earned run average (ERA), with 116 saves.

== Early life ==
Bottalico played for South Catholic High School in Hartford, Connecticut, under coach Tom DiFiore. Bottalico went on to attend Florida Southern College before transferring to Central Connecticut State as a catcher. He was made a pitcher and eventually became the team's top reliever. Bottalico received little attention from scouts, went undrafted in the 1991 Major League Baseball draft, and played that summer for an insurance company in an amateur men's league in Connecticut. A Phillies scout saw him throwing 93 miles per hour (150 km/h) and signed him for $2,000.

== Professional career ==
He made his Major League debut with the Phillies on July 29, 1994, against the Atlanta Braves at Atlanta–Fulton County Stadium. He pitched a scoreless inning in the 1996 Major League Baseball All-Star Game. On August 2, 1998, while pitching for the Phillies in a game against the San Francisco Giants, Bottalico hit Barry Bonds with a pitch, after which Bonds charged the mound in pursuit of Bottalico, igniting a bench-clearing brawl. The incident resulted in the ejection from the game of both players by home plate umpire Jeff Nelson. After suffering an elbow injury and clashing with manager Terry Francona, Bottalico was traded to the St. Louis Cardinals along with Garrett Stephenson in 1998.

After having spent the majority of his early career as a closer, Bottalico's saves dwindled to a total of five in his last five seasons.

As his playing career wound down, the Brewers released him in July 2005. Following a brief August trial with the Boston Red Sox’ AAA team, he was released again, later that month. In 2006, Bottalico was signed by the Baltimore Orioles to a minor-league contract and invited to spring training; however, he failed to make the team, and was released.

Throughout his career, Bottalico had many more games finished (301) than save opportunities (160).

== Broadcasting ==
Bottalico is a commentator for Phillies Pregame Live and Phillies Postgame Live, appearing before and after Phillies broadcasts on NBC Sports Philadelphia. He also occasionally substitutes as the play-by-play commentator. Since August 1, 2022, he appears on "The Best Show Ever?" on 97.5 The Fanatic and NBC Sports Philadelphia. Following the end of "The Best Show Ever?" he was retained by the station is now featured on "Unfiltered" with co-host Bill Colarullo in the same time slot.
