= Brien Taylor =

American baseball player (born 1971)

- Pitcher
- Born: December 26, 1971 (age 54); Beaufort, North Carolina, U.S.
- Bats: Left Throws: Left
- Stats at Baseball Reference

Brien McKeiver Taylor (born December 26, 1971) is an American former pitcher in minor league baseball. He spent seven seasons in the minor leagues, primarily with the New York Yankees organization. In his career, he had a win–loss record of 22–30, a 5.12 earned run average (ERA), and 425 strikeouts.

Born in Beaufort, North Carolina, Taylor attended East Carteret High School, where his pitching ability caused him to be chosen by the New York Yankees with the first overall selection in the 1991 Major League Baseball draft. After two full seasons in the minor leagues, he injured his shoulder in a fight, and was ineffective after returning to baseball. He retired in 2000, having never played a game above Double–A. He is one of three players to be drafted first overall in the Major League Baseball draft and never play in the major leagues, along with Steve Chilcott and Brady Aiken.

== Early life and MLB draft ==
Taylor was born in Beaufort, North Carolina, on December 26, 1971, to parents Willie Ray, who worked as a mason, and Bettie, who was a crab picker at the local seafood facility. He was the second of four children, and was named after the lead character in the movie Brian's Song. Taylor attended East Carteret High School in Beaufort and played on the school baseball team. In high school, Taylor had a win–loss record of 29-6 and an earned run average (ERA) of 1.25. He also struck out 213 hitters in 88 innings pitched while walking 28. His fastball often hit 98 and 99 mph. The New York Yankees selected Taylor with the first overall selection in the 1991 Major League Baseball draft, and he signed Scott Boras as an advisor, who said of him in 2006, "Brien Taylor, still to this day, is the best high school pitcher I've seen in my life."

The Yankees offered Taylor $300,000 to sign a minor league contract, the typical amount given to the first overall draft choice at that time. However, Boras advised the Taylor family that the previous year's top-rated high school pitcher, Todd Van Poppel, was given more than $1.2 million to sign with the Oakland Athletics, and turned down a scholarship to the University of Texas in the process. The Taylors held out for a three-year $1.2 million contract, even though they had less leverage because Brien's poor grades in high school prevented him from receiving a major college scholarship offer. The family informed the Yankees that Taylor would not sign and instead attend Louisburg College, a local junior college, to convince the Yankees to agree to their terms. The Yankees were without the official services of owner George Steinbrenner, who was serving a suspension at the time, but through the media, Steinbrenner said that if the Yankees let Taylor get away, "they should be shot." Taylor signed for $1.55 million on August 26, the day before his classes were set to begin. Further delay would have meant the deal could not be signed until after the school year ended, which coincided with the following year's draft.

== Baseball career ==
The Yankees originally planned to bring Taylor up through the minor leagues rapidly, as the Mets did with Dwight Gooden. However, they found that he needed time to develop, especially to make a better move to first base to hold base runners, and elected not to expedite his major league debut. Before even playing a game, he was named the game's top prospect by Baseball America before the 1992 season. He began his professional career with the Fort Lauderdale Yankees, the Yankees' High–A minor league affiliate. His performances with Fort Lauderdale included throwing nine strikeouts against the Osceola Astros in an 8–5 victory, as well as a 12-strikeout, two-hit performance in September against the West Palm Beach Expos. For the season, Taylor had a 6–8 win–loss record, a 2.57 ERA, and 187 strikeouts in 161 1/3 innings pitched.

The next year, Taylor took the stage for the Double-A Albany-Colonie Yankees, where the Yankees planned to have Taylor work on his curveball, as they already felt that his fastball was good enough for the major leagues. Entering the season, he was named baseball's second-best prospect behind Chipper Jones. That year, Taylor had a 13–7 record, a 3.48 ERA, and 150 strikeouts in 163 innings, but also led the Eastern League with 102 walks issued. In 1994, he was expected to pitch for the Triple-A Columbus Clippers of the International League, and start for the Yankees to begin the 1995 season at the latest, dependent on how well he would have performed in spring training. After the season ended, the Yankees wanted Taylor to take part in an instructional league to work on his fundamentals. Taylor declined to attend the camp, and instead chose to return to his home in North Carolina.

On December 18, 1993, Taylor was injured while defending his brother Brenden in a fistfight. The New York Times reported that Brenden confronted a man named Ron Wilson, who he had fought with in Harlowe, North Carolina. Brenden suffered head lacerations during his fight with Wilson. Once Brien discovered his brother had been hurt, he and a cousin went to Wilson's trailer home to confront him. There, Taylor got into an altercation with Jamie Morris, Wilson's friend, and Taylor fell on his shoulder. According to Wilson, Taylor attempted to throw a haymaker at Morris, but missed, which caused the injury. In the hours following the altercation, Boras told reporters the injury was just a bruise. However, when the Yankees made arrangements for Taylor to visit Dr. Frank Jobe, he called the injury one of the worst he'd seen. The following week, Jobe performed surgery to repair tears in the capsule and glenoid labrum of Taylor's shoulder, which caused him to miss the entire 1994 season.

Taylor returned to baseball in 1995 and spent the season with the Rookie-level Gulf Coast Yankees. Following the surgery, Taylor's performance deteriorated as the speed of his fastball slowed down and had trouble getting his curveball to reach the strike zone. As a result, in his first season back, he had a 2–5 win–loss record with a 6.08 ERA and issued 54 walks in 40 innings pitched. The Yankees planned to have Taylor spend the 1996 season with the Double-A Norwich Navigators, but he continued to struggle with his control in spring training, saying at one point, "Sometimes I get the ball across the plate, sometimes I feel like I've never held a ball in my life". He instead spent the year with the Single-A Greensboro Bats and walked 43 batters in 16 1/3 innings, going 0–5 with an 18.73 ERA in nine starts, none of which lasted past the third inning. The Yankees outrighted Taylor from their 40-man roster.

Taylor spent the next two seasons in Single-A Greensboro. In 1997, he walked 52 batters in 27 innings, going 1–4 with a 14.33 ERA in eight games, and in 1998, he went 0–1 with a 9.59 ERA in 13 games. He was released by the Yankees at the end of the 1998 season, and signed with the Seattle Mariners the following year. With the Mariners, Taylor took part in extended spring training but was released in June due to his inconsistency. After the 1999 season, the Cleveland Indians signed him to a minor league contract and optioned to the Class-A Columbus RedStixx. In 2 2/3 innings pitched over five games for Columbus, he allowed five hits, eight runs and issued nine walks with a 27.00 ERA. (Altogether, Taylor's ERA was 3.02 in 324 1/3 innings before the injury, and 11.24 in 111 1/3 innings after.)

== After baseball ==
After retiring from baseball, Taylor moved to Raleigh, North Carolina, with his five daughters and worked as a UPS package handler, then worked as a beer distributor. By 2006, he had moved back home and was working as a bricklayer with his father.

In March 2012, Taylor was charged with cocaine trafficking after undercover narcotics agents purchased a large quantity of cocaine and crack cocaine from him over a period of several months. He was federally indicted on cocaine trafficking charges in June 2012. Taylor pleaded guilty in August 2012 and was sentenced to 38 months in prison, followed by three years' supervised release; he was released on September 12, 2015.

Achievements
Preceded by Chipper Jones	First overall pick in the MLB Entry Draft; 1991	Succeeded by Phil Nevin
