= Matt Beech =

American baseball player (born 1972)

- Pitcher
- Born: January 20, 1972 (age 54); Oakland, California, U.S.
- Batted: Left Threw: Left

MLB debut
- August 8, 1996, for the Philadelphia Phillies

Last MLB appearance
- August 9, 1998, for the Philadelphia Phillies

MLB statistics
- Win–loss record: 8–22
- Earned run average: 5.37
- Strikeouts: 266
- Stats at Baseball Reference

Teams
- Philadelphia Phillies (1996–1998)

Lucas Matthew Beech (born January 20, 1972) is an American professional baseball player. He played in Major League Baseball with the Philadelphia Phillies from 1996 to 1998.

In 2005, Beech played for the Erie SeaWolves of the Eastern League. As an independent league player in 2007 for the Bridgeport Bluefish, Beech was attacked with a bat by José Offerman during a game in which Beech was pitching to Offerman. Beech had hit Offerman with a pitch causing him to charge the mound with his bat. Catcher John Nathans was hit in the head and sustained a concussion. Beech's finger was broken during this incident.
