= Scott Ruffcorn =

American baseball player (born 1969)

- Pitcher
- Born: December 29, 1969 (age 56); New Braunfels, Texas, U.S.
- Batted: Right Threw: Right

MLB debut
- June 19, 1993, for the Chicago White Sox

Last MLB appearance
- August 17, 1997, for the Philadelphia Phillies

MLB statistics
- Win–loss record: 0–8
- Earned run average: 8.57
- Strikeouts: 46
- Stats at Baseball Reference

Teams
- Chicago White Sox (1993–1996); Philadelphia Phillies (1997)

Scott Patrick Ruffcorn (born December 29, 1969) is an American former professional baseball pitcher. He played in Major League Baseball for the Chicago White Sox and Philadelphia Phillies between 1993 and 1997.

== Amateur career ==
Ruffcorn attended Stephen F. Austin High School in Austin, Texas. He then attended Baylor University, where he compiled a 20–7 record in three seasons. In 1989, he played collegiate summer baseball in the Cape Cod Baseball League for the Yarmouth-Dennis Red Sox.

== Professional career ==
Ruffcorn was the first-round pick of the Chicago White Sox in the 1991 Major League Baseball draft, and the 25th player picked overall. He played with the White Sox at the major league level from 1993 to 1996. In 1997 he played for the Philadelphia Phillies. He never recorded a win at the major league level, ending his career with an 0–8 mark. Additionally, Ruffcorn's team lost every one of the 30 major league games in which he appeared.

== Coaching career ==
After his playing career, he served as the head coach at Hyde Park High School in Austin, Texas.
