= Kevin Lomon =

American baseball player (born 1971)

- Pitcher
- Born: November 20, 1971 (age 54); Fort Smith, Arkansas, U.S.
- Batted: Right Threw: Right

MLB debut
- April 27, 1995, for the New York Mets

Last MLB appearance
- September 28, 1996, for the Atlanta Braves

MLB statistics
- Win–loss record: 0–1
- Earned run average: 5.94
- Strikeouts: 7
- Stats at Baseball Reference

Teams
- New York Mets (1995); Atlanta Braves (1996)

Kevin Dale Lomon (born November 20, 1971) is a former Major League Baseball pitcher who played for the New York Mets (1995) and Atlanta Braves (1996).

== Early life and draft ==
Prior to playing professionally, Lomon attended Cameron High School in Cameron, Oklahoma and then University of Arkansas-Fort Smith. He was drafted by the Atlanta Braves in the 14th round of the 1991 amateur draft.

On December 5, 1994, he was drafted by the Mets in that year's Rule 5 Draft.

== Major league career ==
Lomon made his major league debut for the Mets on April 27, 1995 at the age of 23. He made six relief appearances in his first big league season and went 0-1 with a 6.75 ERA. In 9 1/3 innings, he allowed 17 hits, while walking five batters and striking out six. On May 30, he was returned to the Braves.

Lomon made six relief appearances for the Braves in 1996, going 0-0 with a 4.91 ERA in 7 1/3 innings. He allowed seven hits while walking three batters and striking out one. On September 28, he played his final big league game.

Overall, Lomon went 0-1 with a 5.94 ERA in 12 big league appearances. He pitched 16 2/3 innings and allowed 24 hits and eight walks. He struck out seven batters.

== Minor league career ==
Lomon pitched in the minor leagues from 1991 to 2001, spending time in the Braves' (1991–1996), New York Yankees' (1997), San Diego Padres' (1998) and Anaheim Angels' (1999) system. He also pitched for the Solano Steelheads of the Western League in 2000 and for the Steelheads and Torreon Algodoneros of the Mexican League in 2001. Though he pitched for the Mets, he never played in their minor league system.

He showed flashes of excellence at times throughout his career. For example, in his first professional season, he went 7-0 with a 0.73 ERA in 11 games (five starts) for the Pulaski Braves and Macon Braves. He also struck out 72 batters in 49 innings that year, while allowing only 19 hits. In 2000, he posted a 2.45 ERA in 10 relief appearances for the Steelheads.

Overall, he went 65-59 with a 4.16 ERA in 241 games (171 starts). In 1,104 2/3 batters, he struck out 948 batters and walked only 436.
