= Kevin Morgan (baseball) =

American baseball player (born 1969)

- Third baseman
- Born: December 3, 1969 (age 56); Lafayette, Louisiana, U.S.
- Batted: Right Threw: Right

MLB debut
- June 15, 1997, for the New York Mets

Last MLB appearance
- June 15, 1997, for the New York Mets

MLB statistics
- Batting average: .000
- Home runs: 0
- Runs batted in: 0
- Stats at Baseball Reference

Teams
- New York Mets (1997)

Kevin Lee Morgan (born December 3, 1969) is an American former Major League Baseball player and current Minnesota Twins executive. In 1997, he had one at bat for the New York Mets, pitching hitting for Barry Manuel and popping out on the first pitch he saw in the Major Leagues; he finished the game by playing two innings in the field at third base.

He formerly served as the Mets' Director of Minor League Operations.

A native of Lafayette, Louisiana, Morgan attended Southeastern Louisiana University and in 1989 he played collegiate summer baseball with the Chatham A's of the Cape Cod Baseball League. He was selected by Detroit Tigers in the 30th round of the 1991 MLB draft. He was traded by the Tigers to the Mets in 1994, and appeared in a single major league game for the Mets in 1997.

== Sources ==
- Career statistics from Baseball Reference · Baseball Reference (Minors) · Retrosheet · Baseball Almanac
