= Ryan Karp =

American baseball player

- Pitcher
- Born: April 5, 1970 (age 56); Los Angeles, California, U.S.
- Batted: Left Threw: Left

MLB debut
- June 23, 1995, for the Philadelphia Phillies

Last MLB appearance
- September 27, 1997, for the Philadelphia Phillies

MLB statistics
- Win–loss record: 1–1
- Earned run average: 5.29
- Strikeouts: 20
- Stats at Baseball Reference

Teams
- Philadelphia Phillies (1995, 1997)

Ryan Jason Karp (born April 5, 1970) is an American former Major League Baseball pitcher who played for the Philadelphia Phillies in 1995 and 1997.

== Baseball career ==
Out of The University of Miami Karp was drafted by the Houston Astros in the 73rd round of the 1989 amateur player draft. He did not sign with the team, and played college baseball at the University of Miami.

Karp was drafted in the 9th round of the 1992 amateur draft by the New York Yankees and signed. In 1993, pitching for three different minor league teams (the Greensboro Hornets, the Prince William Cannons, and the Albany-Colonie Yankees), Karp was 16–3 with a 2.11 ERA, and struck out 176 batters in 173 innings.

He was traded February 9, 1994, to the Philadelphia Phillies with Kevin Jordan and Bobby Muñoz for Terry Mulholland and a player to be named later (Jeff Patterson). He made his major league debut on June 23, 1995; it was the only game he played that season. He spent 1996 in the minor leagues and played in 15 games in 1997 for the Phillies.

In November 1997, he was the 54th overall pick by the Tampa Bay Devil Rays in the 1997 MLB expansion draft. He pitched for the Triple-A Durham Bulls in 1998, and split the 1999 season between the independent Bridgeport Bluefish and the Oklahoma RedHawks and Tulsa Drillers of the Texas Rangers organization.

== Post-playing career ==
Karp is the Director of Tax Technology for Amgen, Inc.
