= Takashi Kashiwada =

Japanese baseball player

Takashi Kashiwada 柏田 貴史
- Pitcher
- Born: May 14, 1971 (age 54); Yatsushiro, Kumamoto, Japan
- Batted: Left Threw: Left

Professional debut
- NPB: April 12, 1994, for the Yomiuri Giants
- MLB: May 1, 1997, for the New York Mets

Last appearance
- MLB: September 18, 1997, for the New York Mets
- NPB: August 28, 2004, for the Yomiuri Giants

NPB statistics
- Win–loss record: 4–2
- Earned run average: 3.91
- Strikeouts: 115

MLB statistics
- Win–loss record: 3–1
- Earned run average: 4.31
- Strikeouts: 19
- Stats at Baseball Reference

Teams
- Yomiuri Giants (1994–1996); New York Mets (1997); Yomiuri Giants (1998–2004)

Takashi Kashiwada (柏田 貴史, born May 14, 1971, in Yatsushiro, Kumamoto, Japan) is a retired Japanese professional baseball player. He played for the Yomiuri Giants and the New York Mets. He was a left-handed relief pitcher who wore #18 while with the Mets. He made his Major League Baseball (MLB) debut on May 1, 1997, and pitched in his final MLB game on September 18, 1997. He batted left-handed.

== Biography ==
Kashiwada played baseball at his local high school, and joined the Yomiuri Giants from outside the draft in 1990. He spent most of his first six seasons on their minor league team. He led the minors in wins in 1995, but was given few opportunities in the Central League.

Kashiwada joined the New York Mets spring training session in 1997, and started the season with their Triple-A team, the Norfolk Tides. He was promoted to the major leagues a few weeks into the season, then stayed up for the rest of the season. He had won only 1 game in Japan, but went 3-1 with a 4.31 ERA in 35 games with the Mets. He returned to the Giants the next year, and was used almost exclusively against left-handed hitters from 1999~2001, pitching in over 50 games in 1999 and 2000. The emergence of several other left-handed pitchers in 2002 (including Hideki Okajima) forced Kashiwada out of his role as a specialist against lefty hitters. He did not pitch a single game in 2005, and announced his retirement at the end of the season. He was re-hired by the Yomiuri Giants as an international scout after his retirement.
