= Ron Blazier =

American baseball player (1971–2021)

- Pitcher
- Born: July 30, 1971; Altoona, Pennsylvania, U.S.
- Died: December 4, 2021 (aged 50); Bellwood, Pennsylvania, U.S.
- Batted: Right Threw: Right

MLB debut
- May 31, 1996, for the Philadelphia Phillies

Last MLB appearance
- September 28, 1997, for the Philadelphia Phillies

MLB statistics
- Win–loss record: 4–2
- Earned run average: 5.38
- Strikeouts: 67
- Stats at Baseball Reference

Teams
- Philadelphia Phillies (1996–1997)

Ronald Patrick Blazier (July 30, 1971 – December 4, 2021) was an American professional baseball pitcher, who played in Major League Baseball (MLB) for the Philadelphia Phillies (1996–1997). He threw and batted right-handed.

== Biography ==
Blazier was signed by the Phillies as an amateur free agent, mid-way through the 1989 season. Over the course of Blazier's brief big league career, he compiled a 4–2 win–loss record, pitching in 63 games, with an earned run average (ERA) of 5.38.

He was elected to the Blair County Sports Hall of Fame in 2008 having attended local area high school Bellwood-Antis.

Blazier was employed as a forklift operator at PGW Industries in Tipton.

== Death ==
Blazier died at his home in Bellwood, Pennsylvania on December 4, 2021. He was fifty years old. The cause of death was not disclosed.
