= Cameron, Oklahoma =

Cameron, Oklahoma Kʋlih Chaha (Choctaw)
- Town
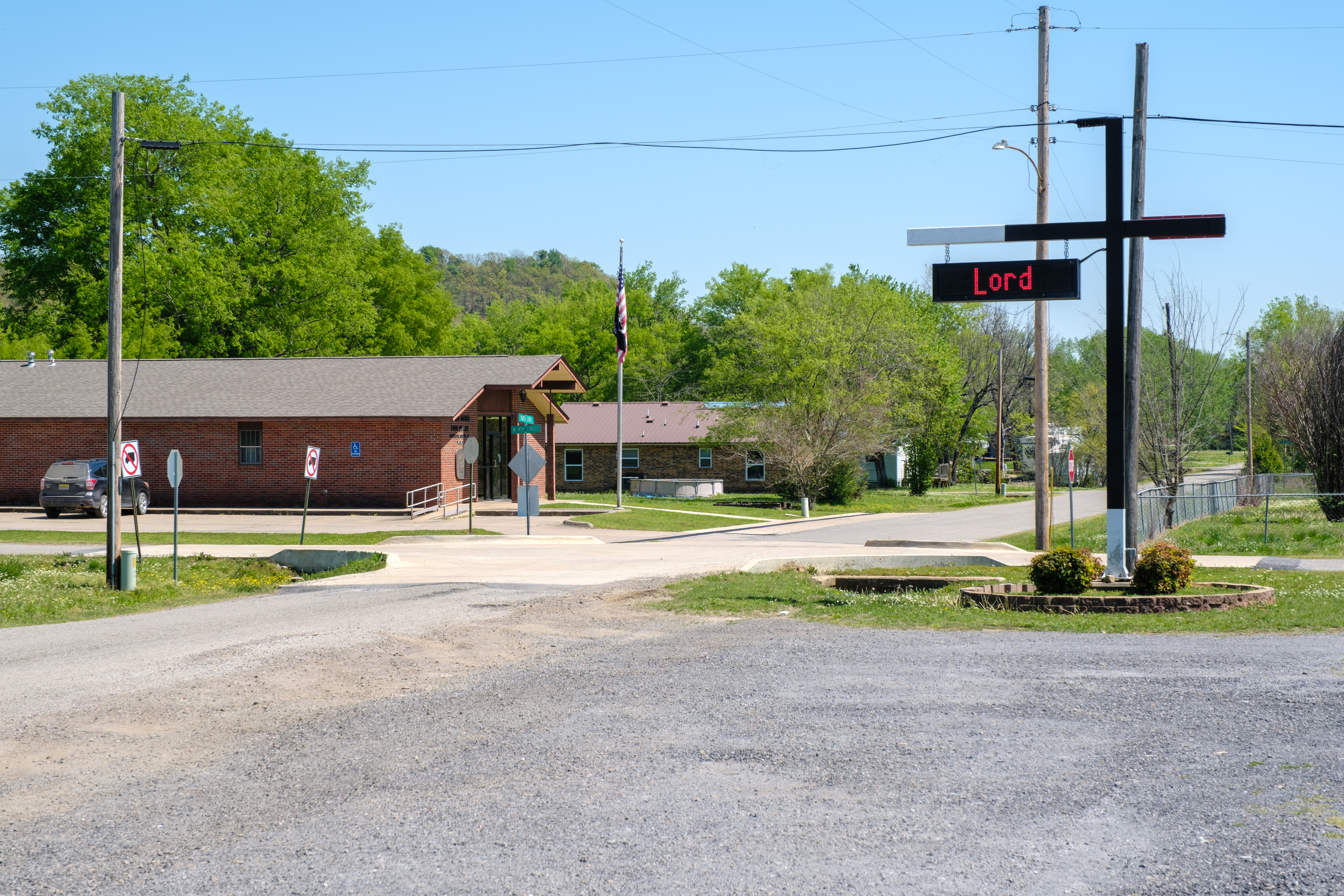
- Church St. and W. 4th St. in 2024

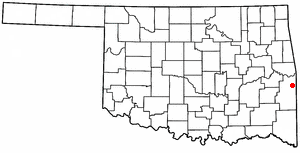
- Location of Cameron, Oklahoma
- Coordinates: 35°08′14″N 94°32′21″W
- Country: United States
- State: Oklahoma
- County: Le Flore

Area
  - Total: 1.49 sq mi (3.86 km^{2})
  - Land: 1.49 sq mi (3.86 km^{2})
  - Water: 0 sq mi (0.00 km^{2})
- Elevation: 495 ft (151 m)

Population (2020)
  - Total: 323
  - Density: 216.4/sq mi (83.57/km^{2})
- Time zone: UTC-6 (Central (CST))
  - Summer (DST): UTC-5 (CDT)
- ZIP code: 74932
- Area codes: 539/918
- FIPS code: 40-11300
- GNIS feature ID: 2413153

Cameron is a town in Le Flore County, Oklahoma, United States. As of the 2020 census, Cameron had a population of 323.

== History ==
When the Fort Smith and Southern Railway laid tracks in the area of the present day town of Cameron in 1886–87, there was already a settlement of about 40 people. (Note: The St. Louis and San Francisco Railway (aka SL&SF, or Frisco) bought the Fort Smith and Southern in February 1887 and completed the line.) At the time of its founding, Cameron was located in Skullyville County, a part of the Moshulatubbee District of the Choctaw Nation. The U. S. Post Office Department established a post office that it named Cameron, Indian Territory in 1888. According to Encyclopedia of Oklahoma History and Culture, the post office and town may have been named for either of two persons. One was William Cameron, a former Mine Inspector for Indian Territory. The other was James Cameron, an employee of the Fort Smith and Southern Railway.

In 1883, James Reynolds, a successful rancher and entrepreneur, established the Cameron Institute, which was sponsored by the Presbyterian Church but was open to enrolling students of any denomination. It educated children from primary to high school level. Reynolds became a resident of Cameron, where he built an imposing home, now known as the James E. Reynolds House, that had the appearance of a castle. The building is on the National Register of Historic Places listings in LeFlore County, Oklahoma.

== Geography ==
Cameron is located 8 miles (13 km) northeast of Poteau.

According to the United States Census Bureau, the town has a total area of 0.3 square miles (0.78 km^{2}), all land.

== Demographics ==
Historical population
Census	Pop.	Note	%±
1900	316		—
1910	206		−34.8%
1920	203		−1.5%
1930	283		39.4%
1940	203		−28.3%
1950	209		3.0%
1960	211		1.0%
1970	311		47.4%
1980	365		17.4%
1990	327		−10.4%
2000	312		−4.6%
2010	302		−3.2%
2020	323		7.0%
U.S. Decennial Census

=== 2020 census ===
As of the 2020 census, Cameron had a population of 323. The median age was 32.5 years. 27.6% of residents were under the age of 18 and 13.3% of residents were 65 years of age or older. For every 100 females there were 101.9 males, and for every 100 females age 18 and over there were 105.3 males age 18 and over.

0.0% of residents lived in urban areas, while 100.0% lived in rural areas.

There were 124 households in Cameron, of which 33.9% had children under the age of 18 living in them. Of all households, 36.3% were married-couple households, 28.2% were households with a male householder and no spouse or partner present, and 24.2% were households with a female householder and no spouse or partner present. About 18.6% of all households were made up of individuals and 7.2% had someone living alone who was 65 years of age or older.

There were 140 housing units, of which 11.4% were vacant. The homeowner vacancy rate was 0.0% and the rental vacancy rate was 2.6%.

Racial composition as of the 2020 census
Race	Number	Percent
White	220	68.1%
Black or African American	0	0.0%
American Indian and Alaska Native	53	16.4%
Asian	0	0.0%
Native Hawaiian and Other Pacific Islander	0	0.0%
Some other race	5	1.5%
Two or more races	45	13.9%
Hispanic or Latino (of any race)	11	3.4%

=== 2000 census ===
As of the census of 2000, there were 312 people, 115 households, and 90 families residing in the town. The population density was 1,158.9 inhabitants per square mile (447.5/km^{2}). There were 126 housing units at an average density of 468.0 per square mile (180.7/km^{2}). The racial makeup of the town was 83.65% White, 0.32% African American, 11.54% Native American, and 4.49% from two or more races.

There were 115 households, out of which 35.7% had children under the age of 18 living with them, 53.9% were married couples living together, 15.7% had a female householder with no husband present, and 21.7% were non-families. 20.0% of all households were made up of individuals, and 8.7% had someone living alone who was 65 years of age or older. The average household size was 2.71 and the average family size was 3.11.

In the town, the population was spread out, with 26.6% under the age of 18, 9.3% from 18 to 24, 29.5% from 25 to 44, 23.1% from 45 to 64, and 11.5% who were 65 years of age or older. The median age was 35 years. For every 100 females, there were 113.7 males. For every 100 females age 18 and over, there were 104.5 males.

The median income for a household in the town was $23,750, and the median income for a family was $26,339. Males had a median income of $27,679 versus $17,321 for females. The per capita income for the town was $11,055. About 14.7% of families and 19.6% of the population were below the poverty line, including 32.9% of those under age 18 and 10.5% of those age 65 or over.
