= Calvin Maduro =

Aruban baseball player (born 1974)

Leones de Yucatán
- Pitcher / Coach
- Born: September 5, 1974 (age 52); Santa Cruz, Aruba
- Batted: Right Threw: Right

MLB debut
- September 8, 1996, for the Philadelphia Phillies

Last MLB appearance
- June 4, 2002, for the Baltimore Orioles

MLB statistics
- Win–loss record: 10–19
- Earned run average: 5.78
- Strikeouts: 140
- Stats at Baseball Reference

Teams
- Philadelphia Phillies (1996–1997); Baltimore Orioles (2000–2002)

Calvin Gregory Maduro (born September 5, 1974) is an Aruban former professional baseball pitcher who currently serves as the bench coach for the Leones de Yucatán of the Mexican Baseball League. He played five years in Major League Baseball between 1996 and 2002 for the Philadelphia Phillies and Baltimore Orioles. After his playing career, he became a minor league pitching coach and scout for the Orioles and Minnesota Twins.

He pitched for the Netherlands in the 2004 Summer Olympics and 2006 World Baseball Classic.

== Playing career ==
Maduro signed with the Orioles on September 9, 1991. He was one of several Aruban players who would play for the Orioles signed by scout Jesus "Chu" Halabi. As a prospect, Maduro had one of the best changeups in the Orioles farm system. He was named an Appalachian League All-Star in 1993. He pitched a no-hitter on May 28, 1996 for the Bowie Baysox.

Maduro was sent from the Orioles to the Phillies on September 3, 1996, completing a trade that began when Todd Zeile and Pete Incaviglia were acquired by Baltimore on August 29 and ended when Garrett Stephenson also went to Philadelphia on September 4. Maduro was a September call-up for the Phillies, making his MLB debut on September 8, five days after Gene Kingsale of the Orioles became the first Aruban to play in MLB. Maduro pitched in four games, making two starts, in 1996. The following season, he had 13 starts and two relief appearances for the Phillies, going 3–7 with a 7.23 ERA. He pitched in Triple-A in 1998, with the Phillies releasing him after the season.

Maduro re-signed with the Orioles as a minor league free agent in 1999, spending another season in Triple-A. He re-signed in 2000 and made the Orioles Opening Day starting rotation. His start on April 7 was his first MLB start since July 1997. During his next start, on April 15, Cal Ripken Jr. hit his 3,000th hit. Maduro later called that game his favorite baseball memory. He spent time in the minors, and his season ended in June with an ulnar collateral ligament injury. He re-signed with Baltimore and made the Opening Day roster in 2001 in a relief role. He moved to the starting rotation on July 25. In his final season in the majors in 2002, he was 2–5 with a 5.56 ERA in 12 appearances, 10 of them starts. He signed with the Los Angeles Dodgers before the 2003 season but was released in May. He also pitched for the independent Newark Bears. He signed with the New York Yankees in May 2005, becoming a free agent after the season. In 2006, he returned to the Orioles organization, pitching in Double-A and ending his top-level pitching career in June.

Maduro also pitched for the Dutch Honkbal Hoofdklasse club HCAW starting in May 2004. He joined Neptunus in October 2005, pitching once for the team in the 2006 playoffs.

== International career ==
Maduro made his debut with the Netherlands national team at the 2003 Baseball World Cup. He was named the best pitcher of the 2004 Haarlem Baseball Week tournament, which the Dutch won. At the 2004 Summer Olympics in Athens, he and his team finished sixth. He went 1–1 in two starts with a 2.35 ERA in 7 2/3 innings. He pitched for the Netherlands in the 2006 World Baseball Classic, allowing sox runs in three innings.

== Post-playing career ==
In 2005, Maduro was named the pitching coach for the Aberdeen IronBirds of the New York–Penn League, an Orioles farm team. He spent three seasons there, then two more seasons with the Gulf Coast Orioles before becoming a scout in 2010. He was fired in 2019 by new general manager Mike Elias.

The Minnesota Twins hired Maduro as the pitching coach of the Single-A Cedar Rapids Kernels in 2020, but the minor league season was canceled due to the COVID-19 pandemic. He became the pitching coach for the Gulf Coast Twins in 2021, holding that job through 2023.

On May 20, 2026, Maduro was hired to serve as the bench coach for the Leones de Yucatán of the Mexican Baseball League.

== Honors ==
After the 2003 season, Maduro was decorated as a Knight in the Order of Orange-Nassau, along with fellow Aruban baseball players Gene Kingsale and Sidney Ponson.

== Personal life ==
Maduro graduated from the Tourist Economy School in Aruba in 1991, where he played baseball, soccer, and volleyball. He attended St. Antonius College.

Following his playing career, Maduro resided in Millersville, Maryland.
