= Edgar Ramos (baseball) =

Venezuelan baseball player (born 1975)

- Pitcher
- Born: March 6, 1975 (age 51); Cumaná, Venezuela
- Batted: Right Threw: Right

MLB debut
- May 21, 1997, for the Philadelphia Phillies

Last MLB appearance
- May 30, 1997, for the Philadelphia Phillies

MLB statistics
- Win–loss record: 0–2
- Earned run average: 5.14
- Strikeouts: 4
- Stats at Baseball Reference

Teams
- Philadelphia Phillies (1997)

Edgar Jose Ramos (born March 6, 1975) is a Venezuelan former professional baseball pitcher. Ramos played for the Philadelphia Phillies of Major League Baseball (MLB). He threw and batted right-handed.

== Career ==
In Ramos' 4 games at the MLB level, he posted a 0–2 record with four strikeouts and a 5.14 earned run average (ERA), in 14 innings pitched.

Ramos was signed as an undrafted free agent on February 3, 1992, by the Houston Astros. He was selected by the Phillies in the Rule 5 draft, on December 9, 1996; Ramos was returned to the Astros.

Ramos continued in Minor League Baseball (MiLB) through the 2001 season and made a brief comeback attempt in the Venezuelan Professional Baseball League (VPBL) in Winter, 2006–2007.

== See also ==
- List of players from Venezuela in Major League Baseball
