= Kevin Jordan (baseball) =

American baseball player (born 1969)

- Infielder
- Born: October 9, 1969 (age 56); San Francisco, California, U.S.
- Batted: Right Threw: Right

MLB debut
- August 8, 1995, for the Philadelphia Phillies

Last MLB appearance
- October 7, 2001, for the Philadelphia Phillies

Career statistics
- Batting average: .258
- Home runs: 23
- Runs batted in: 175
- Stats at Baseball Reference

Teams
- Philadelphia Phillies (1995–2001)

Kevin Wayne Jordan (born October 9, 1969) is an American former Major League Baseball infielder who played for the Philadelphia Phillies from 1995 to 2001. He also played a substantial part of his career with the Brisbane Bandits in the Australian Baseball League from 1993 through to 1997.

Jordan managed the Brisbane Bandits in the Australian Baseball League.

In January 2018, it was announced that Jordan would be serving as a part-time color analyst for Phillies radio broadcasts during the 2018 season.
