= Garrett Stephenson =

American baseball player (born 1972)

- Pitcher
- Born: January 2, 1972 (age 54); Takoma Park, Maryland, U.S.
- Batted: Right Threw: Right

MLB debut
- July 25, 1996, for the Baltimore Orioles

Last MLB appearance
- September 17, 2003, for the St. Louis Cardinals

MLB statistics
- Win–loss record: 39–39
- Earned run average: 4.55
- Strikeouts: 408
- Stats at Baseball Reference

Teams
- Baltimore Orioles (1996); Philadelphia Phillies (1997–1998); St. Louis Cardinals (1999–2000, 2002–2003)

Garrett Charles Stephenson (born January 2, 1972) is an American former Major League Baseball pitcher. He played eight seasons in the majors, from 1996–2003.

Stephenson's father, Rich, pitched briefly in the Pittsburgh Pirates system and the family were observant Mormons. Stephenson played baseball at Linganore High School and later Boonsboro High School in Boonsboro, Maryland and also averaged 24 points per game as a basketball player. His only college scholarship offers for baseball were a half-scholarship offer from BYU and a full ride from Ricks College. He accepted the latter and, after two years at Ricks, he was selected by the Baltimore Orioles in the 18th round of the 1992 Major League Baseball draft.

Stephenson made his Major League debut with the Orioles on July 25, 1996. He was sent from the Orioles to the Phillies six weeks later on September 4 in a transaction that began when Todd Zeile and Pete Incaviglia were acquired by Baltimore on August 29 and included Calvin Maduro also going to Philadelphia on September 3. In May 2000, Stephenson was named National League Pitcher of the Month after winning 5 games and posting a 1.42 earned run average.

Stephenson suffered a sprained medial collateral ligament in Game 3 of the 2000 National League Division Series against the Atlanta Braves. The injury led to him having Tommy John surgery and missing the entire 2001 season.

Although he did not pitch in the series, Stephenson was sued for allegedly punching a San Francisco Giants fan following a game in the 2002 National League Championship Series. Stephenson and teammates conceded that he confronted and shoved the fan but argued that he threw no punches.

== After retirement ==
Stephenson is now retired to Boise, Idaho, where he coaches a baseball team, and co-founded GSG Sports Academy and the Idaho Raptors club baseball program. He and his wife Stephanie have three sons, Riley, Teagan, and Britten. Riley played baseball at the University of Maryland, Baltimore County. Britten played baseball at the University of Rio grande in Ohio.
