= 1995 Atlanta Braves season =

Major League Baseball season

1995 Atlanta Braves
- World Series champions National League champions National League East champions
- League: National League
- Division: East
- Ballpark: Fulton County Stadium
- City: Atlanta
- Record: 90–54 (.625)
- Divisional place: 1st
- Owners: Ted Turner
- General managers: John Schuerholz
- Managers: Bobby Cox
- Television: WTBS; TBS Superstation (Pete Van Wieren, Skip Caray, Don Sutton, Joe Simpson); SportSouth (Tim Brando, Ernie Johnson, Ernie Johnson, Jr.)
- Radio: WSB (AM) (Pete Van Wieren, Skip Caray, Don Sutton, Joe Simpson)

The 1995 Atlanta Braves season was the 125th season in the history of the franchise and 30th season in the city of Atlanta. The team finished the strike-shortened season with a record of 90–54, the best in the National League, en route to winning the World Series. For the sixth straight season, the team was managed by Bobby Cox.

The Braves started the season in mediocre fashion, posting a 20–17 record up to June 4, putting them in third place behind the Philadelphia Phillies and the Montreal Expos. The team went on to win twenty of the last twenty-five games before the All-Star Break to put themselves in first place by four and a half games. In the second half of the season, the Braves pulled away from the rest of the division by going 11–7 over the rest of July and 19–10 in August. The team went on to win the division by twenty-one games. The Braves' 90–54 record was second only to the American League's Cleveland Indians, who went 100–44 on the season.

In the postseason, the Braves beat the Colorado Rockies in the NL Division Series three games to one, then swept the Cincinnati Reds four games to zero to win the NL Championship Series. In the World Series, the Braves beat the Cleveland Indians four games to two, bringing the first World Series championship to the city of Atlanta.

Through completion of the 2025 MLB season, the Braves are one of three teams out of nine MLB franchises to have first swept their opponent in the League Championship Series (LCS), and subsequently go onto win the World Series; the other teams were the 2019 Washington Nationals, 2022 Houston Astros, and the 2025 Los Angeles Dodgers. This two-decades-long milestone for Atlanta is based upon the (LCS) becoming a best-of-seven (games) format 10 years earlier, in 1985.

Opening Day starter Greg Maddux led the National League in wins (19) and earned run average (1.63) to secure his fourth consecutive Cy Young Award. Marquis Grissom won a Gold Glove for center field, and Greg Maddux won his sixth (of thirteen) consecutive Gold Gloves.

This would be the last World Series title for the Braves until the 2021 season.

1995 would also be the first full season for Chipper Jones as a full-time starter. Jones was scheduled to compete with Ron Gant for the starting Third Base position in 1994, however Gant broke his leg in a dirt bike accident while Jones himself tore his left knee during spring training, forcing the Braves to play veteran infielder Terry Pendleton at third base for the entire season. By the start of the season, Gant was traded to the Reds, while Pendleton was traded to the Marlins. The trades freed up Jones to become the Braves regular third baseman.

== Offseason ==
The Braves 1995 season began without some of the regular contributors of 1994. The team lost Terry Pendleton, Dave Gallagher, and Bill Pecota to free agency. Roberto Kelly and Tony Tarasco were also traded with Esteban Yan to the Montreal Expos for Marquis Grissom. They signed free agents Mike Sharperson, Dwight Smith, and Mike Stanton. The Braves five starting pitchers remained the same from 1994.

The Braves would also be playing in the brand–new National League East in 1995. The division was formed through realignment prior to the 1994 Major League Baseball season, but division championships were not awarded in 1994 due to the 1994 strike. The division includes the Philadelphia Phillies, the Montreal Expos, the Florida Marlins, and the New York Mets.

== Regular season ==
=== Opening Day starters ===
- SS Jeff Blauser
- CF Marquis Grissom
- 3B Chipper Jones
- RF David Justice
- LF Mike Kelly
- 2B Mark Lemke
- C Javy López
- P Greg Maddux
- 1B Fred McGriff

=== Season standings ===
NL East
Team	W	L	Pct.	GB	Home	Road
Atlanta Braves	90	54	.625	—	44‍–‍28	46‍–‍26
New York Mets	69	75	.479	21	40‍–‍32	29‍–‍43
Philadelphia Phillies	69	75	.479	21	35‍–‍37	34‍–‍38
Florida Marlins	67	76	.469	22½	37‍–‍34	30‍–‍42
Montreal Expos	66	78	.458	24	31‍–‍41	35‍–‍37

=== Record vs. opponents ===
1995 National League record Source: MLB Standings Grid – 1995
Team	ATL	CHC	CIN	COL	FLA	HOU	LAD	MON	NYM	PHI	PIT	SD	SF	STL
Atlanta	—	8–4	8–5	9–4	10–3	6–6	5–4	9–4	5–8	7–6	4–2	5–2	7–1	7–5
Chicago	4–8	—	3–7	6–7	8–4	5–8	7–5	3–5	4–3	6–1	8–5	5–7	5–7	9–4
Cincinnati	5–8	7–3	—	5–7	6–6	12–1	4–3	8–4	7–5	9–3	8–5	3–6	3–3	8–5
Colorado	4–9	7–6	7–5	—	5–7	4–4	4–9	7–1	5–4	4–2	8–4	9–4	8–5	5–7
Florida	3–10	4–8	6–6	7–5	—	8–4	3–7	6–7	7–6	6–7	5–8	3–2	5–3	4–3
Houston	6–6	8–5	1–12	4–4	4–8	—	3–2	9–3	6–6	5–7	9–4	7–4	5–3	9–4
Los Angeles	4–5	5–7	3–4	9–4	7–3	2–3	—	7–5	6–6	4–9	9–4	7–6	8–5	7–5
Montreal	4–9	5–3	4–8	1–7	7–6	3–9	5–7	—	7–6	8–5	4–4	7–5	7–6	4–3
New York	8–5	3–4	5–7	4–5	6–7	6–6	6–6	6–7	—	7–6	4–3	6–7	5–8	3–4
Philadelphia	6-7	1–6	3–9	2–4	7–6	7–5	9–4	5–8	6–7	—	6–3	6–6	6–6	5–4
Pittsburgh	2–4	5–8	5–8	4–8	8–5	4–9	4–9	4–4	3–4	3–6	—	4–8	6–6	6–7
San Diego	2–5	7–5	6–3	4–9	2–3	4–7	6–7	5–7	7–6	6–6	8–4	—	6–7	7–5
San Francisco	1–7	7–5	3–3	5–8	3–5	3–5	5–8	6–7	8–5	6–6	6–6	7–6	—	7–6
St. Louis	5–7	4–9	5–8	7–5	3–4	4-9	5–7	3–4	4–3	4–5	7–6	5–7	6–7	—

=== Game log ===
Legend
Braves Win	Braves Loss	Game postponed

1995 Regular Season Game Log
April (4–1)

#	Date	Opponent	Score	Win	Loss	Save	Attendance	Time	Record
1	April 26	Giants	12–5	Maddux (1–0)	Mulholland (0–1)		32,045	2:46	1–0
2	April 27	Giants	6–4	Stanton (1–0)	Burba (0–1)	Clontz (1)	26,120	2:42	2–0
3	April 28	@ Dodgers	1–9	Daal (1–0)	Avery (0–1)		51,181	3:08	2–1
4	April 29	@ Dodgers	4–3	McMichael (1–0)	Murphy (0–1)		45,885	2:55	3–1
5	April 30	@ Dodgers	6–3	Smoltz (1–0)	Martínez (1–1)	Clontz (2)	40,785	3:00	4–1

May (16–12)

#	Date	Opponent	Score	Win	Loss	Save	Attendance	Time	Record
6	May 2	@ Marlins	7–1	Maddux (2–0)	Gardner (0–2)		23,476	3:11	5–1
7	May 3	@ Marlins	6–4	Glavine (1–0)	Witt (0–2)	Clontz (3)	21,918	3:17	6–1
8	May 4	@ Marlins	6–3	Woodall (1–0)	Nen (0–1)	McMichael (1)	23,550	2:24	7–1
9	May 5	Phillies	4–9	Green (1–1)	Mercker (0–1)	Borland (1)	33,296	2:45	7–2
10	May 6	Phillies	1–3	Mimbs (1–0)	Smoltz (1–1)	Slocumb (3)	37,850	2:57	7–3
11	May 7	Phillies	4–5	Schilling (2–0)	Bedrosian (0–1)	Slocumb (4)	34,166	2:30	7–4
12	May 8	Phillies	2–3	Abbott (1–0)	Glavine (1–1)	Slocumb (5)	27,266	2:57	7–5
13	May 9	@ Mets	3–2	McMichael (2–0)	Manzanillo (0–1)	Clontz (4)	14,882	2:21	8–5
14	May 10	@ Mets	2–5	Henry (1–1)	Wohlers (0–1)	Franco (3)	12,620	2:54	8–6
15	May 11	@ Mets	3–5	Jones (2–1)	Smoltz (1–2)	Franco (4)	13,073	2:44	8–7
16	May 12	Reds	4–5 (11)	Brentley (1–0)	Bedrosian (0–2)		33,106	2:57	8–8
17	May 13	Reds	9–6	Glavine (2–1)	Smith (0–1)	Borbón (1)	36,058	2:47	9–8
18	May 14	Reds	3–5 (10)	Carrasco (1–3)	Clontz (0–1)		28,860	3:12	9–9
19	May 15	Rockies	4–0	Mercker (1–1)	Olivares (1–2)		27,009	2:24	10–9
20	May 16	Rockies	15–3	Smoltz (2–2)	Acevedo (2–1)		25,516	2:35	11–9
21	May 17	Rockies	5–6	Holmes (3–0)	Maddux (2–1)	Ruffin (6)	27,070	2:41	11–10
22	May 18	Rockies	3–2	McMichael (3–0)	Munoz (1–2)	Borbón (2)	26,205	2:52	12–10
23	May 19	Marlins	4–0	Avery (1–1)	Veres (0–1)		30,275	2:37	13–10
24	May 20	Marlins	8–7	Wohlers (1–1)	Nen (0–3)		38,212	3:30	14–10
25	May 21	Marlins	5–1	Smoltz (3–2)	Burkett (3–3)		35,141	2:39	15–10
26	May 23	@ Cardinals	7–1	Maddux (3–1)	Jackson (0–5)		26,758	2:37	16–10
27	May 24	@ Cardinals	9–5	Glavine (3–1)	Frascatore (1–1)		20,413	2:49	17–10
28	May 25	@ Cardinals	1–4	Hill (3–0)	Avery (1–2)	Henke (9)	23,807	2:26	17–11
29	May 26	@ Astros	8–3	Mercker (2–1)	Swindell (3–2)		26,246	3:03	18–11
30	May 27	@ Astros	2–3 (10)	Hudek (2–0)	Stanton (1–1)		19,257	3:03	18–12
31	May 28	@ Astros	3–1	Maddux (4–1)	Kile (1–4)		25,526	2:19	19–12
32	May 29	@ Cubs	2–1	Glavine (4–1)	Castillo (3–2)		31,654	2:29	20–12
33	May 31	@ Cubs	1–4	Morgan (1–1)	Avery (1–3)	Myers (12)	27,372	2:28	20–13

June (15–12)

#	Date	Opponent	Score	Win	Loss	Save	Attendance	Time	Record
34	June 1	Dodgers	3–6	Valdez (1–2)	Mercker (2–2)		27,796	2:19	20–14
35	June 2	Astros	2–7	Drabek (2–3)	Smoltz (3–3)		30,041	2:45	20–15
36	June 3	Astros	1–2 (10)	Jones (3–0)	Wohlers (1–2)	Hudek (6)	41,967	2:54	20–16
37	June 4	Astros	2–6	Reynolds (2–4)	Glavine (4–2)		29,507	2:46	20–17
38	June 5	Cubs	7–5	Bedrosian (1–2)	Hickerson (0–2)	Wohlers (1)	27,508	2:43	21–17
39	June 6	Cubs	17–3	Mercker (3–2)	Trachsel (2–3)		32,402	2:48	22–17
40	June 7	Cubs	4–3	Smoltz (4–3)	Perez (0–3)	Wohlers (2)	30,731	2:31	23–17
41	June 9	Cardinals	3–2 (10)	McMichael (4–0)	Arocha (3–4)		33,231	2:18	24–17
42	June 10	Cardinals	3–7	DeLucia (2–3)	Glavine (4–3)		44,956	2:50	24–18
43	June 11	Cardinals	4–8	Habyan (2–1)	Avery (1–4)	Henke (12)	32,515	2:45	24–19
44	June 13	@ Expos	2–11	Pérez (6–1)	Mercker (3–3)		25,492	3:09	24–20
45	June 14	@ Expos	7–3	Smoltz (5–3)	Fassero (7–3)		22,339	2:52	25–20
46	June 15	@ Expos	2–0	Maddux (5–1)	Martínez (5–2)		25,013	2:25	26–20
47	June 16	@ Rockies	2–0	Glavine (5–3)	Swift (1–2)		48,163	2:21	27–20
48	June 17	@ Rockies	7–1	Avery (2–4)	Acevedo (3–6)		50,035	2:47	28–20
49	June 18	@ Rockies	9–4	Mercker (4–3)	Freeman (2–4)		48,302	2:42	29–20
50	June 19	@ Reds	10–0	Smoltz (6–3)	Schourek (4–4)		23,262	2:37	30–20
51	June 20	@ Reds	10–2	Maddux (6–1)	Nitkowski (0–1)		23,418	3:14	31–20
52	June 21	@ Reds	1–3	Smiley (6–1)	Glavine (5–4)	Brantley (10)	23,571	2:22	31–21
53	June 22	@ Reds	8–9	Hernandez (5–0)	Borbón (0–1)	Brantley (11)	30,497	2:47	31–22
54	June 23	Mets	3–9	Saberhagen (4–2)	Mercker (4–4)		38,000	2:17	31–23
55	June 24	Mets	5–4	Smoltz (7–3)	Mlicki (4–4)	Wohlers (3)	46,121	2:45	32–23
56	June 25	Mets	4–2	Maddux (7–1)	Harnisch (1–5)	Wohlers (4)	34,120	2:39	33–23
57	June 26	Expos	4–3	Glavine (6–4)	Aquino (0–2)	Wohlers (5)	31,399	2:25	34–23
58	June 27	Expos	0–3	Henry (3–5)	Avery (2–5)	Rojas (12)	32,916	1:56	34–24
59	June 28	Expos	4–3	Clontz (1–1)	Rojas (1–2)		37,676	2:25	35–24
60	June 30	@ Phillies	1–3	Green (8–4)	Smoltz (7–4)	Slocumb (20)	32,821	2:40	35–25

July (20–7)

#	Date	Opponent	Score	Win	Loss	Save	Attendance	Time	Record
61	July 1	@ Phillies	3–1	Maddux (7–1)	West (2–2)		33,375	2:25	36–25
62	July 2	@ Phillies	5–3	Glavine (7–4)	Mimbs (6–3)	Wohlers (6)	35,648	2:44	37–25
63	July 3	@ Phillies	10–4	Avery (3–5)	Schilling (5–4)		59,203	2:55	38–25
64	July 4	Dodgers	3–2	Clontz (2–1)	Valdez (3–8)	Wohlers (7)	49,104	2:26	39–25
65	July 5	Dodgers	4–1	Wohlers (2–2)	Astacio (1–7)		36,922	3:01	40–25
66	July 6	Dodgers	1–0	McMichael (5–0)	Seánez (1–2)		38,497	2:16	41–25
67	July 7	Giants	8–4	Glavine (8–4)	Greer (0–1)		39,482	2:46	42–25
68	July 8	Giants	9–4	Avery (4–5)	Portugal (5–3)		49,056	2:17	43–25
69	July 9	Giants	3–2	Wohlers (3–2)	Beck (4–3)		37,741	2:33	44–25
–	July 11	1995 Major League Baseball All-Star Game in Arlington, Texas							
70	July 12	@ Pirates	1–2	Parris (2–2)	Smoltz (7–5)	Miceli (11)	9,123	2:13	44–26
71	July 13	@ Padres	4–1	Maddux (9–1)	Hamilton (3–3)		15,028	2:22	45–26
72	July 14	@ Padres	6–2	Glavine (9–4)	Benes (3–6)		17,027	2:17	46–26
73	July 15	@ Padres	7–6	Clontz (3–1)	Florie (2–1)	Wohlers (8)	39,737	2:49	47–26
74	July 16	@ Padres	1–3	Dishman (2–2)	Mercker (4–5)	Hoffman (12)	23,925	2:49	47–27
75	July 18	Pirates	4–5 (10)	Dyer (3–1)	Wohlers (3–3)	Miceli (14)	33,940	3:24	47–28
76	July 19	Pirates	3–2	Maddux (10–1)	Loaiza (6–5)	Wohlers (9)	35,736	2:20	48–28
77	July 20	Pirates	4–3	Clontz (4–1)	Plesac (3–1)		31,661	2:30	49–28
78	July 21	Padres	6–9	Bochtler (1–0)	McMichael (5–1)	Hoffman (14)	39,888	3:33	49–29
79	July 22	Padres	3–2	Wohlers (4–3)	Blair (2–1)		48,827	2:29	50–29
80	July 23	Padres	2–1	Smoltz (8–5)	Hamilton (3–5)	Wohlers (10)	37,109	2:14	51–29
81	July 24	@ Pirates	3–2	Clontz (5–1)	Plesac (3–2)	Wohlers (11)	16,142	2:55	52–29
82	July 25	@ Pirates	3–1 (10)	Clontz (6–1)	Gott (1–3)	Stanton (1)	13,864	3:51	53–29
83	July 26	@ Dodgers	0–1	Valdez (7–6)	Avery (4–6)	Worrell (17)	37,491	2:19	53–30
84	July 27	@ Dodgers	4–9	Cummings (1–0)	Mercker (4–6)		36,942	2:37	53–31
85	July 28	@ Giants	6–2	Clontz (7–1)	Beck (4–5)		21,090	2:12	54–31
86	July 29	@ Giants	5–1	Maddux (11–1)	Mulholland (2–10)		21,772	2:09	55–31
87	July 30	@ Giants	2–3	Brewington (2–0)	Glavine (9–5)	Beck (17)	32,154	2:38	55–32

August (19–10)

#	Date	Opponent	Score	Win	Loss	Save	Attendance	Time	Record
88	August 1	Phillies	3–4	Fernandez (2–5)	Avery (4–7)	Slocumb (25)	38,579	3:05	55–33
89	August 2	Phillies	7–5	Mercker (5–6)	Muñoz (0–2)	Wohlers (12)	35,594	2:56	56–33
90	August 3	Phillies	5–4	Borbón (1–1)	Slocumb (2–2)		37,971	2:24	57–33
91	August 4	@ Expos	4–3	Maddux (12–1)	Martínez (9–7)	Wohlers (13)	20,184	2:20	58–33
92	August 5	@ Expos	9–6	Glavine (10–5)	Henry (6–9)	Wohlers (14)	24,448	3:31	59–33
93	August 6	@ Expos	2–6	Pérez (10–3)	Avery (4–8)		26,257	2:10	59–34
94	August 7	@ Expos	5–1	Mercker (6–6)	Fassero (10–9)		19,480	2:43	60–34
95	August 8	Reds	5–4	Smoltz (9–5)	McElroy (3–3)	Wohlers (15)	38,252	2:29	61–34
96	August 9	Reds	3–9	Burba (6–2)	Maddux (12–2)	Brantley (24)	38,602	2:55	61–35
97	August 10	Reds	2–1	Wohlers (5–3)	Carrasco (2–4)		42,748	2:24	62–35
98	August 11	Rockies	5–3	Avery (5–8)	Reynoso (4–4)	Wohlers (16)	47,408	1:56	63–35
99	August 12	Rockies	4–16	Leskanic (4–1)	Mercker (6–7)		48,777	3:03	63–36
100	August 13	Rockies	3–2	Wohlers (6–3)	Holmes (5–1)		43,279	2:42	64–36
101	August 14	Marlins	4–3	McMichael (6–1)	Pérez (1–4)		34,375	2:30	65–36
102	August 15	Marlins	4–1	Glavine (11–5)	Banks (0–4)	Wohlers (17)	30,939	2:22	66–36
103	August 16	Marlins	5–8	Rapp (7–7)	Avery (5–9)	Nen (15)	35,244	2:41	66–37
104	August 18	@ Cardinals	3–4	Watson (5–4)	Mercker (6–8)	Henke (25)	32,027	2:36	66–38
105	August 19	@ Cardinals	4–5	Urbani (3–4)	Murray (0–1)	Henke (26)	35,475	2:38	66–39
106	August 20	@ Cardinals	1–0	Maddux (13–2)	Morgan (4–7)		24,613	1:50	67–39
107	August 21	@ Astros	5–4	Glavine (12–5)	McMurtry (0–1)	Wohlers (18)	15,291	2:59	68–39
108	August 22	@ Astros	6–4	Avery (6–9)	Brocail (4–2)	Wohlers (19)	14,799	2:52	69–39
109	August 23	@ Astros	6–2	Mercker (7–8)	Hampton (8–6)		21,112	2:46	70–39
110	August 25	@ Cubs	7–3	Smoltz (10–5)	Castillo (8–7)		31,419	2:50	71–39
111	August 26	@ Cubs	7–2	Maddux (14–2)	Trachsel (5–10)		39,775	2:25	72–39
112	August 27	@ Cubs	3–1	Glavine (13–5)	Bullinger (10–5)	Wohlers (20)	36,401	2:50	73–39
113	August 28	@ Cubs	5–7	Navarro (12–5)	Avery (6–10)	Myers (30)	17,072	2:45	73–40
114	August 29	Astros	9–11 (13)	Swindell (8–9)	Murray (0–2)		29,777	4:23	73–41
115	August 30	Astros	0–2	Reynolds (9–9)	Smoltz (10–6)	Jones (13)	29,671	2:34	73–42
116	August 31	Astros	5–2	Maddux (15–2)	Drabek (7–8)		31,274	2:28	74–42

September (16–11)

#	Date	Opponent	Score	Win	Loss	Save	Attendance	Time	Record
117	September 1	Cubs	5–7	Bullinger (11–5)	Glavine (13–6)	Myers (31)	36,424	2:59	74–43
118	September 2	Cubs	4–6	Navarro (13–5)	Avery (6–11)	Myers (32)	49,016	2:47	74–44
119	September 3	Cubs	2–0	Schmidt (1–0)	Foster (9–10)	Wohlers (21)	42,820	2:17	75–44
120	September 4	Cardinals	6–5	Wohlers (7–3)	Parrett (3–6)		29,849	2:42	76–44
121	September 5	Cardinals	1–0	Maddux (16–2)	Urbani (3–5)		27,072	1:57	77–44
122	September 6	Cardinals	6–1	Glavine (14–6)	Petkovsek (5–5)		29,811	2:39	78–44
123	September 7	@ Marlins	1–5	Rapp (10–7)	Avery (6–12)		20,788	1:54	78–45
124	September 8	@ Marlins	6–5	McMichael (7–1)	Pérez (1–6)	Wohlers (22)	21,897	3:01	79–45
125	September 9	@ Marlins	9–5	Clontz (8–1)	Nen (0–6)	Wohlers (23)	32,644	3:08	80–45
126	September 10	@ Marlins	4–5 (11)	Mathews (4–3)	Borbón (1–2)		24,874	3:36	80–46
127	September 11	@ Rockies	4–5 (12)	Hickerson (3–3)	Woodall (1–1)		48,056	3:35	80–47
128	September 12	@ Rockies	2–12	Painter (2–0)	Avery (6–13)	Ritz (2)	48,013	2:14	80–48
129	September 13	@ Rockies	9–7	Schmidt (2–0)	Bailey (7–6)		48,011	3:12	81–48
130	September 15	@ Reds	3–1	Smoltz (11–6)	McElroy (3–4)	McMichael (2)	31,882	2:22	82–48
131	September 16	@ Reds	6–1	Maddux (17–2)	Portugal (9–10)		37,821	2:45	83–48
132	September 17	@ Reds	4–1	Glavine (15–6)	Smiley (12–4)	Wohlers (24)	19,797	2:29	84–48
133	September 18	Mets	7–1	Avery (7–13)	Jones (9–9)		29,635	2:03	85–48
134	September 19	Mets	3–10	Mlicki (9–6)	Schmidt (2–1)		28,837	2:46	85–49
135	September 20	Mets	4–8	Isringhausen (8–2)	Smoltz (11–7)	Franco (26)	29,506	3:05	85–50
136	September 21	Mets	3–0	Maddux (18–2)	Telgheder (1–2)	Wohlers (25)	29,982	1:57	86–50
137	September 22	Expos	5–1	Glavine (12–11)	Pérez (10–8)		43,547	2:36	87–50
138	September 23	Expos	2–5	Martínez (14–9)	McMichael (7–2)	Rojas (29)	48,998	2:29	87–51
139	September 24	Expos	5–4 (10)	Borbón (2–2)	Leiper (1–3)		45,461	3:00	88–51
140	September 26	@ Phillies	5–1	Smoltz (12–7)	Quantrill (11–11)		21,476	2:24	89–51
141	September 27	@ Phillies	6–0	Maddux (19–2)	Mimbs (9–7)		26,636	2:19	90–51
142	September 29	@ Mets	3–6	Jones (10–10)	Glavine (16–7)	Franco (28)	16,007	2:23	90–52
143	September 30	@ Mets	4–8	Minor (4–2)	Schmidt (2–2)	Franco (29)	21,659	3:03	90–53

October (0–1)

#	Date	Opponent	Score	Win	Loss	Save	Attendance	Time	Record
144	October 1	@ Mets	0–1 (11)	Walker (1–0)	Wade (0–1)		18,876	2:42	90–54

=== Notable transactions ===
- April 6, 1995: Roberto Kelly was traded by the Atlanta Braves with Tony Tarasco and Esteban Yan to the Montreal Expos for outfielder Marquis Grissom.
- April 12, 1995: Pitcher Mike Stanton signed up as a free agent with the Atlanta Braves.
- July 31, 1995: Mike Stanton was traded by the Atlanta Braves along with a player to be named later to the Boston Red Sox for players to be named later. The Atlanta Braves sent Matt Murray (on August 31, 1995) to the Boston Red Sox to complete the trade. The Boston Red Sox sent Mike Jacobs (minors) (on August 31, 1995) and Marc Lewis (minors) (August 31, 1995) to the Atlanta Braves to complete the trade.
- August 11, 1995: Luis Polonia was traded by the New York Yankees to the Atlanta Braves for Troy Hughes (minors).
- August 25, 1995: Mike Devereaux was traded by the Chicago White Sox to the Atlanta Braves for Andre King (minors).

== Postseason ==
Legend
Braves Win	Braves Loss	Game postponed

1995 Postseason Game Log
National League Division Series (3–1)

#	Date	Opponent	Score	Win	Loss	Save	Attendance	Time	Record
1	October 3	@ Rockies	5–4	Peña (1–0)	Leskanic (0–1)	Wohlers (1)	50,040	3:19	1–0
2	October 4	@ Rockies	7–4	Peña (2–0)	Munoz (0–1)	Wohlers (2)	50,063	3:08	2–0
3	October 6	Rockies	5–7 (10)	Holmes (1–0)	Wohlers (0–1)	Thompson (1)	51,300	3:16	2–1
4	October 7	Rockies	10–4	Maddux (1–0)	Saberhagen (0–1)		50,027	2:38	3–1

National League Championship Series (4–0)

#	Date	Opponent	Score	Win	Loss	Save	Attendance	Time	Record
1	October 10	@ Reds	2–1 (11)	Wohlers (1–0)	Jackson (0–1)	McMichael (1)	40,382	3:18	1–0
2	October 11	@ Reds	6–2 (10)	McMichael (1–0)	Portugal (0–1)		44,624	3:26	2–0
3	October 13	Reds	5–2	Maddux (1–0)	Wells (0–1)	Wohlers (1)	51,424	2:42	3–0
4	October 14	Reds	6–0	Avery (1–0)	Schourek (0–1)		52,067	2:54	4–0

World Series (4–2)

#	Date	Opponent	Score	Win	Loss	Save	Attendance	Time	Record
1	October 21	Indians	3–2	Maddux (1–0)	Hershiser (0–1)		51,876	2:37	1–0
2	October 22	Indians	4–3	Glavine (1–0)	Martínez (0–1)	Wohlers (1)	51,877	3:17	2–0
3	October 24	@ Indians	6–7 (11)	Mesa (1–0)	Peña (0–1)		43,584	4:09	2–1
4	October 25	@ Indians	5–2	Avery (1–0)	Hill (0–1)	Borbón (1)	43,578	3:14	3–1
5	October 26	@ Indians	4–5	Hershiser (1–1)	Maddux (1–1)	Mesa (1)	43,595	2:33	3–2
6	October 28	Indians	1–0	Glavine (2–0)	Poole (0–1)	Wohlers (2)	51,875	3:01	4–2

=== National League Division Series ===
Game	Score	Date	Location	Time	Attendance
1	Atlanta – 5, Colorado – 4	October 3	Coors Field	3:19	50,040
2	Atlanta – 7, Colorado – 4	October 4	Coors Field	3:08	50,063
3	Colorado – 7, Atlanta – 5	October 6	Atlanta–Fulton County Stadium	3:16	51,300
4	Colorado – 4, Atlanta – 10	October 7	Atlanta–Fulton County Stadium	2:38	50,027

Atlanta wins series, 3-1

=== National League Championship Series ===
Game	Score	Date	Location	Time	Attendance
1	Atlanta – 2, Cincinnati – 1	October 10	Riverfront Stadium	3:18	40,382
2	Atlanta – 6, Cincinnati – 2	October 11	Riverfront Stadium	3:26	44,624
3	Cincinnati – 2, Atlanta – 5	October 13	Atlanta–Fulton County Stadium	2:42	51,424
4	Cincinnati – 0, Atlanta – 6	October 14	Atlanta–Fulton County Stadium	2:54	52,067

Atlanta wins series, 4-0

=== World Series ===
==== Game 1 ====
October 21, 1995, at Atlanta–Fulton County Stadium in Atlanta

Team	1	2	3	4	5	6	7	8	9	R	H	E
Cleveland	1	0	0	0	0	0	0	0	1	2	2	0
Atlanta	0	1	0	0	0	0	2	0	X	3	3	2
WP: Greg Maddux (1-0) LP: Orel Hershiser (0-1); Home runs: CLE: None; ATL: Fred McGriff (1)

==== Game 2 ====
October 22, 1995, at Atlanta–Fulton County Stadium in Atlanta

Team	1	2	3	4	5	6	7	8	9	R	H	E
Cleveland	0	2	0	0	0	0	1	0	0	3	6	2
Atlanta	0	0	2	0	0	2	0	0	X	4	8	2
WP: Tom Glavine (1-0) LP: Dennis Martínez (0-1) Sv: Mark Wohlers (1); Home runs: CLE: Eddie Murray (1); ATL: Javy López (1)

==== Game 3 ====
October 24, 1995, at Jacobs Field in Cleveland, Ohio

Team	1	2	3	4	5	6	7	8	9	10	11	R	H	E
Atlanta	1	0	0	0	0	1	1	3	0	0	0	6	12	1
Cleveland	2	0	2	0	0	0	1	1	0	0	1	7	12	2
WP: José Mesa (1-0) LP: Alejandro Peña (0-1); Home runs: ATL: Fred McGriff (2), Ryan Klesko (1); CLE: None

==== Game 4 ====
October 25, 1995, at Jacobs Field in Cleveland, Ohio

Team	1	2	3	4	5	6	7	8	9	R	H	E
Atlanta	0	0	0	0	0	1	3	0	1	5	11	1
Cleveland	0	0	0	0	0	1	0	0	1	2	6	0
WP: Steve Avery (1-0) LP: Ken Hill (0-1) Sv: Pedro Borbón, Jr. (1); Home runs: ATL: Ryan Klesko (2); CLE: Albert Belle (1), Manny Ramírez (1)

==== Game 5 ====
October 26, 1995, at Jacobs Field in Cleveland, Ohio

Team	1	2	3	4	5	6	7	8	9	R	H	E
Atlanta	0	0	0	1	1	0	0	0	2	4	7	0
Cleveland	2	0	0	0	0	2	0	1	X	5	8	1
WP: Orel Hershiser (1-1) LP: Greg Maddux (1-1) Sv: José Mesa (1); Home runs: ATL: Luis Polonia (1), Ryan Klesko (3); CLE: Albert Belle (2), Jim Thome (1)

==== Game 6 ====
October 28, 1995, at Atlanta–Fulton County Stadium in Atlanta

Team	1	2	3	4	5	6	7	8	9	R	H	E
Cleveland	0	0	0	0	0	0	0	0	0	0	1	1
Atlanta	0	0	0	0	0	1	0	0	X	1	6	0
WP: Tom Glavine (2-0) LP: Jim Poole (0-1) Sv: Mark Wohlers (2); Home runs: CLE: None; ATL: David Justice (1)

=== Roster ===
1995 Atlanta Braves
Roster
Pitchers: 33 Steve Avery; 36 Steve Bedrosian; 51 Pedro Borbón, Jr.; 49 Terry Clark; 52 Brad Clontz; 47 Tom Glavine; 31 Greg Maddux; 34 Darrell May; 38 Greg McMichael; 50 Kent Mercker; 34 Matt Murray; 40 Rod Nichols; 26 Alejandro Peña; 46 Jason Schmidt; 29 John Smoltz; 30 Mike Stanton; 49 Tom Thobe; 36 Terrell Wade; 43 Mark Wohlers; 48 Brad Woodall	Catchers: 8 Javy López; 11 Charlie O'Brien; 12 Eddie Pérez; Infielders: 2 Rafael Belliard; 4 Jeff Blauser; 30 Ed Giovanola; 10 Chipper Jones; 20 Mark Lemke; 27 Fred McGriff; 16 Mike Mordecai; 45 José Oliva; 26 Mike Sharperson	Outfielders: 24 Mike Devereaux; 9 Marquis Grissom; 23 David Justice; 25 Mike Kelly; 18 Ryan Klesko; 15 Brian Kowitz; 17 Luis Polonia; 7 Dwight Smith	Manager: 6 Bobby Cox; Coaches: 37 Jim Beauchamp (bench); 39 Pat Corrales (first base); 28 Clarence Jones (hitting); 54 Leo Mazzone (pitching); 22 Jimy Williams (third base); 52 Ned Yost (bullpen)

== Player stats ==
=== Batting ===
==== Regular starters ====
Note: POS = Position; G = Games played; AB = At bats; R = Runs; H = Hits; 2B = Doubles; HR = Home runs; RBI = Runs batted in; BB = Base on balls; SO = Strikeouts; Avg. = Batting average; OBP = On base percentage; SLG = Slugging percentage

POS	Player	G	AB	R	H	2B	HR	RBI	BB	SO	Avg.	OBP	SLG
SS	Jeff Blauser	115	431	60	91	16	12	31	57	107	.211	.319	.341
CF	Marquis Grissom	139	551	80	142	23	12	42	47	61	.258	.317	.376
3B	Chipper Jones	140	524	87	139	22	23	86	73	72	.265	.353	.450
RF	David Justice	120	411	73	104	17	24	78	73	68	.253	.365	.479
LF	Ryan Klesko	107	329	48	102	25	23	70	47	72	.310	.396	.608
2B	Mark Lemke	116	399	42	101	16	5	38	44	40	.253	.325	.356
C	Javy López	100	333	37	105	11	14	51	14	57	.315	.344	.498
1B	Fred McGriff	144	528	85	148	27	27	93	65	99	.280	.361	.489

==== Other batters ====
Note: POS = Position; G = Games played; AB = At bats; R = Runs; H = Hits; 2B = Doubles; HR = Home runs; RBI = Runs batted in; BB = Base on balls; SO = Strikeouts; Avg. = Batting average; OBP = On base percentage; SLG = Slugging percentage

POS	Player	G	AB	R	H	2B	HR	RBI	BB	SO	Avg.	OBP	SLG
C	Charlie O'Brien	67	198	18	45	7	9	23	29	40	.227	.343	.399
INF	Rafael Belliard	75	180	12	40	2	0	7	6	28	.222	.255	.244
LF	Mike Kelly	97	137	26	26	6	3	17	11	49	.190	.258	.314
OF	Dwight Smith	103	131	16	33	8	3	21	13	35	.252	.327	.412
3B	Jose Oliva	48	109	7	17	4	5	12	7	22	.156	.207	.330
UT	Mike Mordecai	69	75	10	21	6	3	11	9	16	.280	.353	.480
OF	Mike Devereaux	29	55	7	14	3	1	8	2	11	.255	.281	.364
OF	Luis Polonia	28	53	6	14	7	0	2	3	9	.264	.304	.396
OF	Brian Kowitz	10	24	3	4	1	0	3	2	5	.167	.259	.208
IF	Ed Giovanola	13	14	2	1	0	0	0	3	5	.071	.235	.071
UT	Eddie Perez	7	13	1	4	1	1	4	0	2	.308	.308	.615
3B	Mike Sharperson	7	7	1	1	1	0	2	0	2	.143	.143	.286

=== Pitching ===
= Indicates league leader

==== Starting pitchers ====
Note: W = Wins; L = Losses; ERA = Earned run average; G = Games; GS = Games started; SV = Saves; CG = Complete games; SHO = Shutouts; IP = Innings pitched; BB = Base on balls; SO = Strikeouts

Player	W	L	ERA	G	GS	SV	CG	SHO	IP	BB	SO
Greg Maddux	19	2	1.63	28	28	0	10	3	209.2	23	181
Tom Glavine	16	7	3.08	29	29	0	3	1	198.2	66	127
John Smoltz	12	7	3.18	29	29	0	2	1	192.2	72	193
Steve Avery	7	13	4.67	29	29	0	3	1	173.1	52	141
Kent Mercker	7	8	4.15	29	26	0	0	0	143.0	61	102

==== Relief and other pitchers ====
Note: W = Wins; L = Losses; ERA = Earned run average; G = Games; GS = Games started; SV = Saves; CG = Complete games; SHO = Shutouts; IP = Innings pitched; BB = Base on balls; SO = Strikeouts

Player	W	L	ERA	G	GS	SV	CG	SHO	IP	BB	SO
Mark Wohlers	7	3	2.09	65	0	25	0	0	64.2	24	90
Greg McMichael	7	2	2.79	67	0	2	0	0	80.2	32	74
Brad Clontz	8	1	3.65	59	0	4	0	0	69.0	22	55
Pedro Borbón	2	2	3.09	41	0	2	0	0	32.0	17	33
Steve Bedrosian	1	2	6.11	29	0	0	0	0	28.0	12	22
Jason Schmidt	2	2	5.76	9	2	0	0	0	25.0	18	19
Mike Stanton	1	1	5.59	26	0	1	0	0	19.1	6	13
Alejandro Peña	0	0	4.15	14	0	0	0	0	13.0	4	18
Matt Murray	0	2	6.75	4	1	0	0	0	10.2	5	3
Brad Woodall	1	1	6.10	9	0	0	0	0	10.1	8	5
Rod Nichols	0	0	5.40	5	0	0	0	0	6.2	5	3
Terrell Wade	0	1	4.50	3	0	0	0	0	4.0	4	3
Darrell May	0	0	11.25	2	0	0	0	0	4.0	0	1
Terry Clark	0	0	4.91	3	0	0	0	0	3.2	5	2
Tom Thobe	0	0	10.80	3	0	0	0	0	3.1	0	2

== Award winners ==
- Mike Devereaux, OF, NLCS Most Valuable Player
- Tom Glavine, P, Babe Ruth Award
- Tom Glavine, P, Silver Slugger
- Tom Glavine, P, World Series Most Valuable Player
- Marquis Grissom, OF, Gold Glove
- Greg Maddux, P, Gold Glove
- Greg Maddux, P, National League Cy Young Award
- Greg Maddux, P, Pitcher of the Month, July
- Greg Maddux, Sporting News Pitcher of the Year Award

1995 Major League Baseball All-Star Game

- Fred McGriff, 1B, starter
- Greg Maddux, P, reserve

== Farm system ==
Level	Team	League	Manager
AAA	Richmond Braves	International League	Grady Little
AA	Greenville Braves	Southern League	Bruce Benedict
A	Durham Bulls	Carolina League	Matt West
A	Macon Braves	South Atlantic League	Nelson Norman
A-Short Season	Eugene Emeralds	Northwest League	Paul Runge
Rookie	Danville Braves	Appalachian League	Max Venable
Rookie	GCL Braves	Gulf Coast League	Jim Saul
