= List of Atlanta Braves award winners and league leaders =

This is a list of award winners and league leaders for the Atlanta Braves professional baseball franchise, including its years in Boston (1871–1952) and Milwaukee (1953–1965). The awards are MLB-designated and other outside groups such as national press writers and national commercial product manufacturers.

== Award winners ==
=== Most Valuable Player ===
Note: This was renamed the Kenesaw Mountain Landis Memorial Baseball Award in 1944.

- Johnny Evers (1914), Bos, 2B
- Bob Elliott (1947), Bos, 3b
- Hank Aaron (1957), Mil, OF
- Dale Murphy (1982, 1983), Atl, OF
- Terry Pendleton (1991), Atl, 3B
- Chipper Jones (1999), Atl, 3B
- Freddie Freeman (2020), Atl, 1B
- Ronald Acuña Jr. (2023), Atl, OF

=== Cy Young Award ===
- Warren Spahn (1957)
- Tom Glavine (1991, 1998)
- Greg Maddux (1993, 1994, 1995)
- John Smoltz (1996)
- Chris Sale (2024)

=== Jackie Robinson, Rookie of the Year Award ===
Note: Formerly called Rookie of the Year Award by the MLB before 1987

- Earl Williams C (1971)
- Bob Horner 3B (1978)
- David Justice OF (1990)
- Rafael Furcal SS (2000)
- Craig Kimbrel CP (2011)
- Ronald Acuña Jr. OF (2018)
- Michael Harris II OF (2022)
- Drake Baldwin C (2025)

=== Manager of the Year Award ===
See footnote

- Bobby Cox (1991, 2004, 2005)
- Brian Snitker (2018)

=== Platinum Glove Award ===
Note: This award is given to the best defensive player in each league.

- Andrelton Simmons SS (2013)

=== Gold Glove Award ===
- Del Crandall C (1958–1960, 1962)
- Hank Aaron OF (1958–1960)
- Joe Torre C (1965)
- Clete Boyer 3B (1969)
- Félix Millán 2B (1969, 1972)
- Phil Niekro SP (1978–1980, 1982, 1983)
- Dale Murphy OF (1982-1986)
- Terry Pendleton 3B (1992)
- Greg Maddux SP (1993–2002)
- Marquis Grissom CF (1995, 1996)
- Andruw Jones CF (1998-2007)
- Mike Hampton SP (2003)
- Jeff Francoeur OF (2007)
- Jason Heyward OF (2012, 2014)
- Andrelton Simmons SS (2013, 2014)
- Ender Inciarte OF (2016–2018)
- Freddie Freeman 1B (2018)
- Nick Markakis OF (2018)
- Max Fried SP (2020–2022)
- Adam Duvall OF (2021)
- Dansby Swanson SS (2022)
- Chris Sale P (2024)
- Matt Olson 1B (2025–2026)
- Mauricio Dubón UTIL (2026)

=== Wilson Overall Defensive Player of the Year Award ===
- Michael Bourn (NL 2012)
- Jason Heyward (MLB 2014)
- Andrelton Simmons (MLB 2015)

=== Wilson Defensive Player of the Year Award ===
Note: In its first two years, the award was given to a player on each MLB team; one awardee was then named the Overall Defensive Player of the Year for the American League and another for the National League. Starting in 2014, the award is now given to one player at each position for all of Major League Baseball; one of the nine awardees is then named the Overall Defensive Player of the Year for all of Major League Baseball.
Team (National League)

- Michael Bourn (2012)

- Andrelton Simmons (2013)
Shortstop (in MLB)

- Andrelton Simmons (2014, 2015)
Right fielder (in MLB)

- Jason Heyward (2014, 2015)
First base (in MLB)

- Freddie Freeman (2018, 2019)

=== Silver Slugger Award ===
- Dale Murphy OF (1982–85)
- Ron Gant OF (1991)
- Tom Glavine SP (1991, 1995–96, 1998)
- David Justice OF (1993)
- Fred McGriff 1B (1993)
- Jeff Blauser SS (1997)
- John Smoltz SP(1997)
- Chipper Jones 3B (1999-00)
- Mike Hampton SP (2003)
- Javy López C (2003)
- Gary Sheffield OF (2003)
- Johnny Estrada C (2004)
- Andruw Jones CF (2005)
- Brian McCann C (2006, 2008–11)
- Justin Upton OF (2014)
- Ronald Acuña Jr. OF (2019, 2023)
- Ozzie Albies 2B (2019, 2021)
- Freddie Freeman 1B (2019, 2021)
- Marcell Ozuna OF (2020)
- Max Fried SP (2021)
- Austin Riley 3B (2021, 2023)
- Matt Olson 1B (2023, 2026)

=== Hank Aaron Award ===
- Andruw Jones (2005)
- Freddie Freeman (2020)
- Ronald Acuña, Jr. (2023)

=== Edgar Martínez Award ===
- Marcell Ozuna (2020)

=== MLB Delivery Man of the Year Award ===
- Craig Kimbrel (2013)

=== Trevor Hoffman National League Reliever of the Year Award ===
- Craig Kimbrel (2014)

=== Comeback Player of the Year Award ===
- Davey Johnson (1973)
- Lonnie Smith (1989)
- Terry Pendleton (1991)
- Andrés Galarraga (2000)
- Javy López (2003)
- Tim Hudson (2010)
- Josh Donaldson (2019)
- Ronald Acuña Jr. (2025)

=== All-MLB Team ===
- Freddie Freeman (2019–21)
- Ronald Acuña Jr. (2019–20, 2023)
- Michael Soroka (2019)
- Marcell Ozuna (2020)
- Max Fried (2020–22)
- Ozzie Albies (2021, 2023)
- Austin Riley (2021, 2023)
- Matt Olson (2023)
- Spencer Strider (2023)
- Chris Sale (2024, 2026)

=== MLB "This Year in Baseball Awards" ===
See: This Year in Baseball Awards § Award winners
Note: These awards were renamed the "GIBBY Awards" in 2010 and then the "Esurance MLB Awards" in 2015.
Note: Voted by five groups as the best in all of Major League Baseball (i.e., not two awards, one for each league).

==== "This Year in Baseball Awards" Pitcher of the Year ====
See footnote

- John Smoltz (2002)

==== "GIBBY Awards" Closer of the Year ====
See footnote

- Craig Kimbrel (2013)

==== "This Year in Baseball Awards" Setup Pitcher of the Year ====
See footnote

- Chris Hammond (2002)

==== "GIBBY Awards" Best Defensive Player ====
- Andrelton Simmons (2014)

=== Roberto Clemente Award ===
- Phil Niekro (1980)
- Dale Murphy (1988)
- John Smoltz (2005)

=== NL All-Stars ===
- Aaron, Hank, OF, 1966–72, 74; 1B, 1973
- Acuña Jr., Ronald, CF, 2019, 2021–2023, 2025
- Albies, Ozzie, 2B, 2018, 2021, 2023
- Arcia, Orlando, SS, 2023
- Blauser, Jeff, SS, 1997
- Capra, Buzz, SP, 1974
- Carty, Rico, LF, 1970
- Cepeda, Orlando, 1B, 1967
- Contreras, William, C, 2022
- d'Arnaud, Travis, C, 2022
- Elder, Bryce, SP, 2023
- Foltynewicz, Mike, SP, 2018
- Freeman, Freddie, 1B, 2018–19, 2021
- Fried, Max, SP, 2022, 2024
- Furcal, Rafael, SS, 2003
- Galarraga, Andrés, 1B, 2000
- Gant, Ron, DH, 1995
- Glavine, Tom, SP, 1991–92
- Inciarte, Ender, CF, 2017
- Jones, Chipper, 3B, 1996, 1998, 2000–01, 2008
- Justice, David, RF, 1993–94
- López, Javy, C, 1997–98, 2003
- López, Reynaldo, SP, 2024
- Maddux, Greg, SP, 1994, 1997–98
- Markakis, Nick, RF, 2018
- Mathews, Eddie, 3B, 1953, 1955–62
- McCann, Brian, C, 2011
- McGriff, Fred, 1B, 1995–96
- Millán, Félix, 2B, 1969–71
- Murphy, Dale, RF, 1982–83
- Murphy, Sean, C, 2023
- Olson, Matt, 1B, 2023, 2025
- Ozuna, Marcell, DH, 2024
- Prado, Martin, 2B, 2010
- Pendleton, Terry, 3B, 1992
- Riley, Austin, 3B, 2022–23
- Sale, Chris, SP, 2024–25
- Smoltz, John, SP, 1996
- Strider, Spencer, SP, 2023
- Swanson, Dansby, SS, 2022
- Torre, Joe, C, 1966–67
- Uggla, Dan, 2B, 2012
- Weiss, Walt, SS, 1998
- Infante, Omar, Util, 2010

=== World Series MVP ===
- Lew Burdette (1957)
- Tom Glavine (1995)
- Jorge Soler (2021)

=== National League Championship Series MVP ===
- Steve Avery (1991)
- John Smoltz (1992)
- Mike Devereaux (1995)
- Javy López (1996)
- Eddie Pérez (1999)
- Eddie Rosario (2021)

=== All-Star Game MVP ===
Note: This was re-named the Ted Williams Most Valuable Player Award in 2002.

- Fred McGriff (1994)
- Brian McCann (2010)

=== Major League Baseball All-Century Team (1999) ===
- Hank Aaron
- Rogers Hornsby
- Babe Ruth
- Warren Spahn
- Cy Young

=== DHL Hometown Heroes (2006) ===
Note: The nominees were: Chipper Jones, Phil Niekro, John Smoltz, and Warren Spahn.

- Hank Aaron — voted by MLB fans as the most outstanding player in the history of the franchise, based on on-field performance, leadership quality and character value

=== Major League Baseball All-Time Team ===
Note: Brought about by Baseball Writers' Association of America in 1997

- Hank Aaron: Right-field runner up behind Babe Ruth
- Warren Spahn: Left-handed starting pitcher runner up behind Sandy Koufax
- Babe Ruth: Right-field winner
- Rogers Hornsby: Second base winner
- Cy Young: Right-handed starting pitcher runner up behind Walter Johnson
- Casey Stengel: Manager winner

=== Baseball's 100 Greatest Players (1998; The Sporting News) ===
See footnote

- Hank Aaron 5th
- Warren Spahn 21st
- Greg Maddux 39th
- Eddie Mathews 63rd

=== Baseball Prospectus "Internet Baseball Awards" Team of the Decade (1999) ===
See: Baseball Prospectus Internet Baseball Awards#Team of the Decade (1990–1999)

- Rotation (top 5 starting pitchers):
  - Greg Maddux, Cubs–Braves
  - Tom Glavine, Braves
- Pitcher of the Decade:
  - Greg Maddux, Cubs–Braves

=== Players Choice Awards Player of the Year ===
Note: Awarded by fellow major-league players as the Player of the Year in Major League Baseball (not one for each league).

- Andruw Jones (2005)

=== Players Choice Awards NL Outstanding Player ===
- Chipper Jones (1999)
- Andruw Jones (2005)

=== Players Choice Awards NL Outstanding Pitcher ===
- Greg Maddux (1994, 1995, 1998)
- John Smoltz (1996)

=== Rolaids Relief Man of the Year Award (NL) ===
See footnote

- John Smoltz (2002)
- Craig Kimbrel (2012)

=== Baseball America Rookie of the Year ===
Note: Awarded as the Rookie of the Year in Major League Baseball (not one for each league).

- 2000 – Rafael Furcal
- 2010 – Jason Heyward

=== Players Choice Awards NL Outstanding Rookie ===
- Chipper Jones (1995)
- Rafael Furcal (2000)
- Craig Kimbrel (2011)
- Ronald Acuña Jr. (2018)

=== Sporting News NL Rookie of the Year Award ===
Note: In 1961 and from 1963 to 2003, the award was split into two categories (in each league): Rookie Pitcher of the Year and Rookie Player of the Year. Also, for the first three years (1946–1948) and in 1950, there was only one award, for all of MLB.

- Carl Willey (1958)
- Earl Williams (1971; Rookie Player of the Year)
- Bob Horner (1978; Rookie Player of the Year)
- Steve Bedrosian (1982; Rookie Pitcher of the Year)
- Craig McMurtry (1983; Rookie Pitcher of the Year)
- David Justice (1990; Rookie Player of the Year)
- Rafael Furcal (2000; Rookie Player of the Year)
- Jason Heyward (2010)
- Craig Kimbrel (2011)
- Michael Harris II (2022)

=== USA Today NL Top Rookie ===
- Craig Kimbrel (2011)

=== Baseball Prospectus Internet Baseball Awards NL Rookie of the Year ===
- Craig Kimbrel (2011)

=== Baseball America All-Rookie Team ===
See: Baseball America#Baseball America All-Rookie Team

- 2010 – Jason Heyward (OF) and Jonny Venters (RP)
- 2011 – Freddie Freeman (DH), Brandon Beachy (SP; one of five), and Craig Kimbrel (CL)
- 2009 – Tommy Hanson (SP)

=== Topps All-Star Rookie teams ===
- 1961 – Joe Torre (C)
- 1964 – Rico Carty (OF)
- 1969 – Bob Didier (C)
- 1971 – Earl Williams (C)
- 1976 – Jerry Royster (3B)
- 1978 – Bob Horner (3B)
- 1981 – Rufino Linares (OF)
- 1986 – Andrés Thomas (SS)
- 1988 – Ron Gant (2B)
- 1990 – David Justice (OF)
- 1993 – Greg McMichael (RHP)
- 1994 – Javy López (C), Jose Oliva (3B), Ryan Klesko (OF)
- 1995 – Chipper Jones (3B)
- 1996 – Jermaine Dye (OF)
- 1997 – Andruw Jones (OF)
- 2000 – Rafael Furcal (SS)
- 2002 – Damian Moss (LHP)
- 2004 – Adam LaRoche (1B)
- 2005 – Brian McCann (C), Jeff Francoeur (OF)
- 2009 – Tommy Hanson (RHP)
- 2010 – Jason Heyward (OF)
- 2011 – Craig Kimbrel (RP)

=== Players Choice Awards 'Comeback Player' ===
- John Smoltz (2002, tie with Mike Lieberthal)
- Tim Hudson (2010)
- Andrés Galarraga (1993, 2000)

=== Players Choice Awards Marvin Miller Man of the Year ===
Note: Awarded by fellow major-league players as the Man of the Year in Major League Baseball (not one for each league).

- John Smoltz (2002, 2003)
- Chipper Jones (2012)

=== Lou Gehrig Memorial Award ===
- Warren Spahn (1961)
- Hank Aaron (1970)
- Phil Niekro (1979)
- Dale Murphy (1985)
- John Smoltz (2005)

=== Baseball America Manager of the Year ===
See: Baseball America#Baseball America Manager of the Year

- Bobby Cox (2004, 2010)

== Team award ==
- 1877 – National League pennant
- 1878 – National League pennant
- 1891 – National League pennant
- 1892 – National League pennant
- 1893 – National League pennant
- 1897 – National League pennant
- 1898 – National League pennant
- 1914 – National League pennant
- 1914 – World Series championship
- 1948 – National League pennant
- 1957 – National League pennant
- 1957 – World Series championship
- 1958 – National League pennant
- 1991 – Warren C. Giles Trophy (National League champion)
- 1991 – Baseball America Organization of the Year
- 1992 – Warren C. Giles Trophy (National League champion)
- 1995 – Warren C. Giles Trophy (National League champion)
- 1995 – Commissioner's Trophy (World Series champion)
- 1996 – Warren C. Giles Trophy (National League champion)
- 1996 – Baseball America Organization of the Year
- 1999 – Warren C. Giles Trophy (National League champion)
- 2005 – Baseball America Organization of the Year
- 2021 – Warren C. Giles Trophy (National League champion)
- 2021 – Commissioner's Trophy (World Series champion)
- 2023 – National League Silver Slugger Team Award

== Minor-league system ==
=== Baseball America Minor League Player of the Year Award ===
- Andruw Jones (1995, 1996)
- Jason Heyward (2009)

=== USA Today Minor League Player of the Year Award ===
- Mark Wohlers (1991)
- Andruw Jones (1995, 1996)
- Jason Heyward (2009)

== Other achievements ==
=== National Baseball Hall of Fame ===
See: Atlanta Braves#Baseball Hall of Famers

=== Retired numbers ===
See: Atlanta Braves#Retired numbers

=== Ford C. Frick Award (broadcasters) ===
See: Atlanta Braves#Ford C. Frick Award recipients (broadcasters)

=== Sports Illustrated Sportsman of the Year ===
- Dale Murphy (1987; one of eight "Athletes Who Care" selected that year instead of the usual Sportsman of the Year)

=== Milwaukee Braves Wall of Honor ===
The Milwaukee Braves Wall of Honor at American Family Field in Milwaukee, Wisconsin, is an exhibit that commemorates players who made significant contributions to the Braves during their time in the city from 1953 to 1965.

== League leaders ==
League leader means they led the National League in the particular category. (Not the entire MLB or the American Association (before 1900).)

=== Wins ===
- John Clarkson 49 (1889)
- Kid Nichols 30 (1896), 31 (1897), 31 (1898)
- Red Barrett 23 (1945)
- Johnny Sain 24 (1948)
- Warren Spahn 21 (1949), 21 (1950), 23 (1953), 21 (1957), 22 (1958), 21 (1959), 21 (1960), 21 (1961)
- Phil Niekro 20 (1974), 21 (1979)
- John Smoltz 16 (2006), 24 (1996)
- Tom Glavine 20 (1991), 20 (1992), 20 (1998), 21 (2000)
- Greg Maddux 16 (1994), 19 (1995)
- Denny Neagle 20 (1997)
- Russ Ortiz 21 (2003)
- Kyle Wright 21 (2022)
- Spencer Strider 20 (2023)

=== Saves ===
- Jack Manning 5 (1876)
- Bobby Mathews 2 (1881)
- Jim Whitney 2 (1883)
- John Morrill 2 (1884)
- Bill Stemmyer 1 (1887)
- Bill Sowders 2 (1889)
- John Clarkson 3 (1891)
- Kid Nichols 3 (1891), 3 (1895), 3 (1897), 4 (1898)
- Vic Willis 3 (1902)
- Tom Hughes 9 (1915)
- Don McMahon 15 (1959)
- John Smoltz 55 (2002)
- Craig Kimbrel 46 (2011)*, 42 (2012), 50 (2013), 47 (2014)
- Kenley Jansen 41 (2022)

=== E.R.A. ===
- Tommy Bond 2.11 (1877), 1.96 (1879)
- John Clarkson 2.73 (1889)
- Vic Willis 2.50 (1899)
- Jim Turner 2.38 (1937)
- Warren Spahn 2.36 (1947), 2.10 (1953), 3.02 (1961)
- Chet Nichols Jr. 2.88 (1951)
- Lew Burdette 2.70 (1956)
- Phil Niekro 1.87 (1967)
- Buzz Capra 2.28 (1974)
- Greg Maddux 2.36 (1993), 1.56 (1994), 1.63 (1995), 2.22 (1998)

=== Strikeouts ===
- Tommy Bond 170 (1877), 182 (1878)
- Jim Whitney 345 (1883)
- John Clarkson 308 (1885), 237 (1887), 284 (1889)
- Vic Willis 225 (1902)
- Warren Spahn 151 (1949), 191 (1950), 164 (1951), 183 (1952)
- Phil Niekro 262 (1977)
- John Smoltz 215 (1992), 276 (1996)
- Spencer Strider 281 (2023)

=== Home runs ===
- Charley Jones 9 (1879 – Boston Red Caps (Braves))
- Jim O'Rourke 6 (1880 – Boston Red Caps (Braves))
- Harry Stovey 16 (1891 – Boston Beaneaters (Braves))
- Hugh Duffy 11 (1897), 18 (1894) – Boston Beaneaters (Braves)
- Jimmy Collins 15 (1898 – Boston Beaneaters (Braves))
- Herman Long 12 (1900 – Boston Beaneaters (Braves))
- Dave Brain 10 (1907 – Boston Doves (Braves))
- Fred Beck 10 (1910 – Boston Doves (Braves))
- Wally Berger 34 (1935 – Boston Braves)
- Tommy Holmes 28 (1945 – Boston Braves)
- Eddie Mathews 47 (1953), 46, (1959)
- Hank Aaron 44 (1966), 39 (1967), 44 (1963), 44 (1957)
- Dale Murphy 36 (1984), 37 (1985)
- Andruw Jones 51 (2005)
- Marcell Ozuna 18 (2020)
- Matt Olson 54 (2023)

=== Runs batted in ===
- Wally Berger 130 (1935)
- Hank Aaron 132 (1957), 126 (1960), 130 (1963), 127 (1966)
- Dale Murphy 109 (1982), 121 (1983)
- Andruw Jones 128 (2005)
- Marcell Ozuna 56 (2020)
- Adam Duvall 113 (2021)
- Matt Olson 139 (2023)

=== Batting average ===
- Deacon White .387 (1877)
- Dan Brouthers .373 (1889)
- Hugh Duffy .440 (1894)
- Rogers Hornsby .387 (1928)
- Ernie Lombardi .330 (1942)
- Hank Aaron .328 (1956), .355 (1959)
- Rico Carty .366 (1970)
- Ralph Garr .353 (1974)
- Terry Pendleton .319 (1991)
- Chipper Jones .364 (2008)

=== On-base percentage ===
- Rico Carty .454 (1970)
- Chipper Jones .470 (2008)
- Ronald Acuña Jr. .416 (2023)

=== Hits ===
- Hank Aaron 200 (1956), 223 (1959)
- Red Schoendienst 200 (1957)
- Felipe Alou 218 (1966), 210 (1968)*
- Ralph Garr 214 (1974)
- Terry Pendleton 187 (1991), 199 (1992)
- Tommy Holmes 191 (1947), 224 (1945)
- Eddie Brown 201 (1926)
- Doc Miller 192, (1911)
- Ginger Beaumont 187, (1907)
- Hugh Duffy 237, (1894)
- Ezra Sutton 162, (1884)
- Deacon White 103, (1877)
- Ronald Acuña Jr. 217 (2023)

=== Stolen bases ===
- Ronald Acuña Jr. 37 (2019), 73 (2023)
- Michael Bourn 61 (2011)
- Bill Bruton 25 (1955), 34 (1954), 26 (1953)
- Sam Jethroe 35 (1951), 35 (1950)

=== Runs ===
- Dale Murphy 118 (1985)
- Hank Aaron 113 (1967), 121 (1963), 118 (1957)
- Felipe Alou 122 (1966)
- Bill Bruton 112 (1960)
- Earl Torgeson 120 (1950)
- Freddie Freeman 51 (2020), 120 (2021)
- Ronald Acuña Jr. 127 (2019), 149 (2023)

== See also ==
- Baseball awards
- List of Major League Baseball awards
- Warren Spahn Award

== Footnotes ==
Achievements
Preceded by Philadelphia Athletics; 1913	World Series Champions; Boston Braves; 1914	Succeeded by Boston Red Sox; 1915 and 1916
Preceded by New York Yankees; 1956	World Series Champions; Milwaukee Braves; 1957	Succeeded by New York Yankees; 1958
Preceded by Toronto Blue Jays; 1992 and 1993	World Series Champions; Atlanta Braves; 1995	Succeeded by New York Yankees; 1996
Preceded by Los Angeles Dodgers; 2020	World Series Champions; Atlanta Braves; 2021	Succeeded by Houston Astros; 2022

Achievements
Preceded by New York Giants; 1913	National League Champions; Boston Braves; 1914	Succeeded by Philadelphia Phillies; 1915
Preceded by Brooklyn Dodgers; 1947	National League Champions; Boston Braves; 1948	Succeeded by Brooklyn Dodgers; 1949
Preceded by Brooklyn Dodgers; 1955 and 1956	National League Champions; Milwaukee Braves; 1957 and 1958	Succeeded by Los Angeles Dodgers; 1959
Preceded by Cincinnati Reds; 1990	National League Champions; Atlanta Braves; 1991 and 1992	Succeeded by Philadelphia Phillies; 1993
Preceded by Philadelphia Phillies; 1993	National League Champions; Atlanta Braves; 1995 and 1996	Succeeded by Florida Marlins; 1997
Preceded by San Diego Padres; 1998	National League Champions; Atlanta Braves; 1999	Succeeded by New York Mets; 2000
Preceded by Los Angeles Dodgers; 2020	National League Champions; Atlanta Braves; 2021	Succeeded by -TBD- 2022
