= List of Atlanta Braves first-round draft picks =

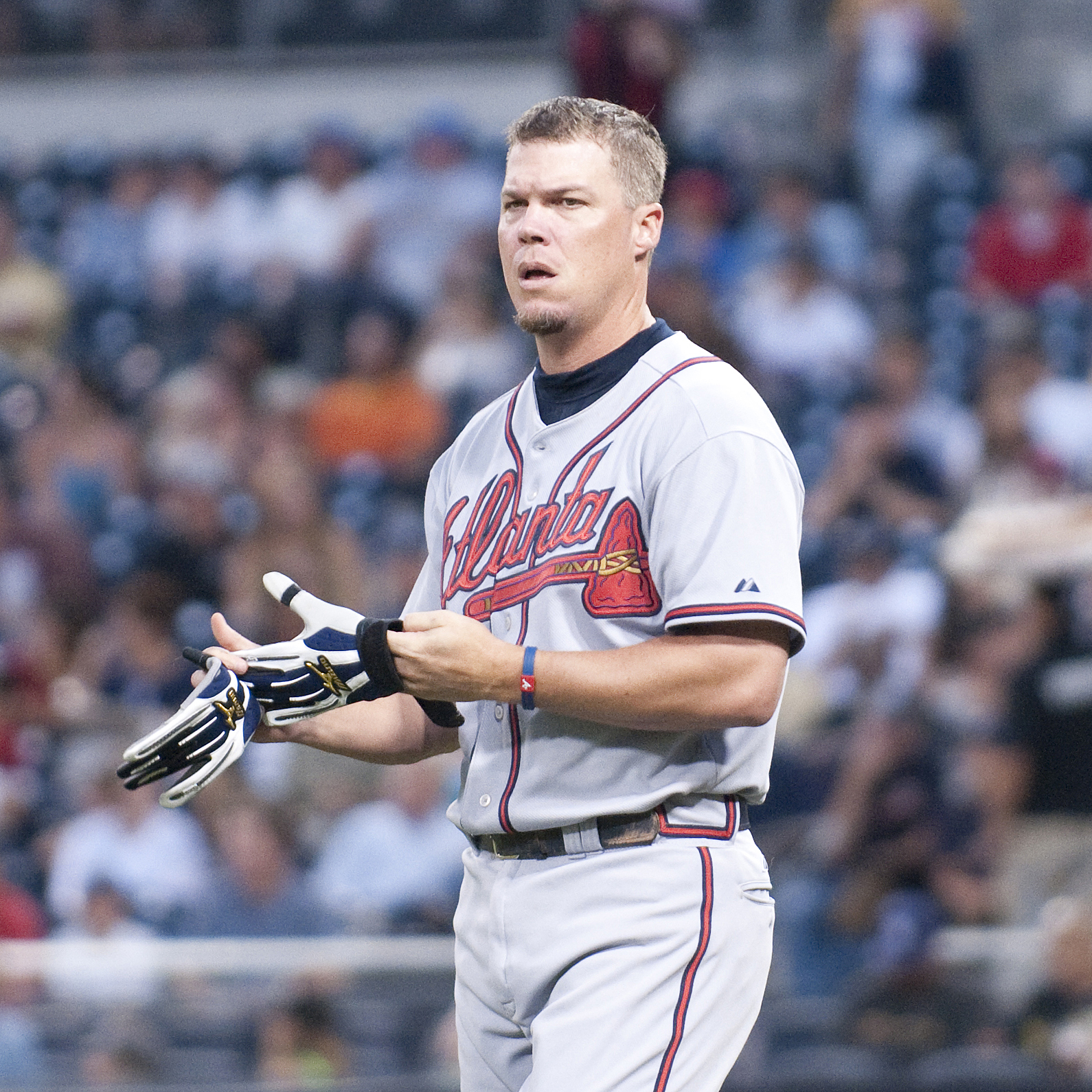
Chipper Jones won the National League MVP Award in 1999, four years after winning a World Series ring.

The Atlanta Braves are a Major League Baseball (MLB) franchise based in Atlanta, Georgia. They play in the National League East division. Officially known as the "First-Year Player Draft", the Rule 4 Draft is MLB's primary mechanism for assigning players from high schools, colleges, and other amateur clubs to its franchises. The draft order is determined based on the previous season's standings, with the team possessing the worst record receiving the first pick. In addition, teams which lost free agents in the previous off-season may be awarded compensatory or supplementary picks. Since the establishment of the draft in 1965, the Braves have selected 56 players in the first round.

Of those 56 players, 27 have been pitchers, the most of any position; 15 of these were right-handed, while 12 were left-handed. The Braves have also selected eight outfielders, seven shortstops, five catchers, four third basemen, three first basemen, and two second basemen in the initial round of the draft. The franchise has drafted nine players from colleges or high schools in the state of Florida, more than any other state. Eight more selections have come from their home state of Georgia. Two selections have come from outside the 50 United States: Luis Atilano (2003) is from the Commonwealth of Puerto Rico, and Scott Thorman (2000) is from Ontario, Canada.

Four of these players have won a World Series championship with the Braves—Kent Mercker, Steve Avery, Chipper Jones, and Mike Kelly—all as part of the 1995 championship team. The team's 1974 selection, Dale Murphy, won consecutive National League Most Valuable Player Awards (NL MVP) in 1982 and 1983, the Lou Gehrig Memorial Award in 1985, and the Roberto Clemente Award in 1988. Bob Horner, the Braves' 1978 selection, won the National League Rookie of the Year Award in the same year. Chipper Jones, drafted by the Braves in 1990, won the NL MVP Award in 1999. The Braves have held the first overall pick twice; in 1978 they used it to select Horner, and in 1990 they chose Chipper Jones.

Atlanta has made 13 selections in the supplemental round of the draft. They have also received three compensatory picks since the first draft in 1965. These additional picks are provided when a team loses a particularly valuable free agent in the previous off-season,^{[V]} or, more recently, if a team fails to sign a draft pick from the previous year. The Braves failed to sign 1995 selection Chad Hutchinson, for which they received the 35th overall pick in the 1996 draft, which they used to draft Jason Marquis.

== Key ==
Year	Each year links to an article about that year's Major League Baseball draft.
Position	Indicates the secondary/collegiate position at which the player was drafted, rather than the professional position the player may have gone on to play
Pick	Indicates the number of the pick
*	Player did not sign with the Braves
§	Indicates a supplemental pick
†	Member of the National Baseball Hall of Fame and Museum
'95	Player was a member of the Braves' 1995 championship team
'21	Player was a member of the Braves' 2021 championship team

== Picks ==
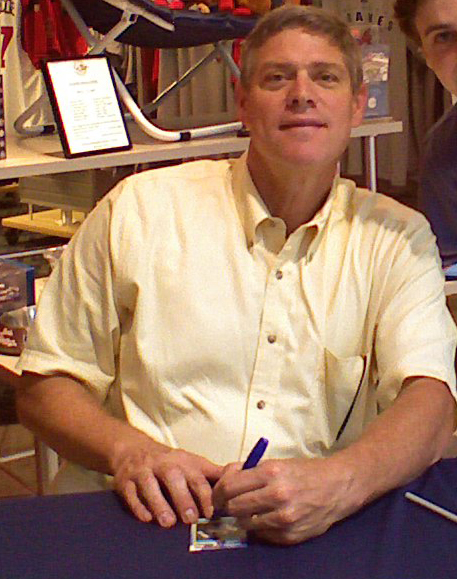
The Braves have retired uniform number 3 in honor of Dale Murphy (1974).

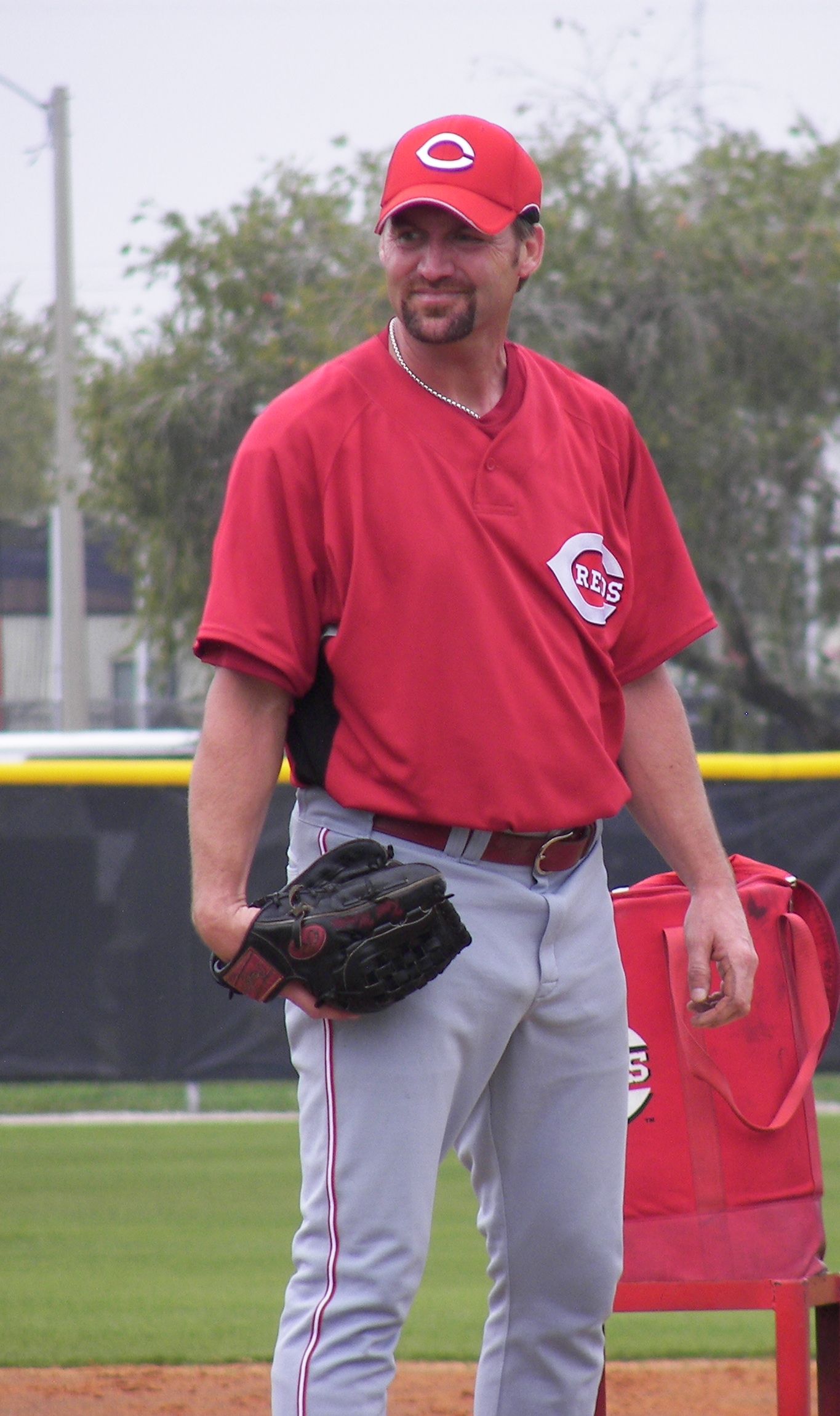
Kent Mercker (1986) threw a no-hitter against the Los Angeles Dodgers in 1994.

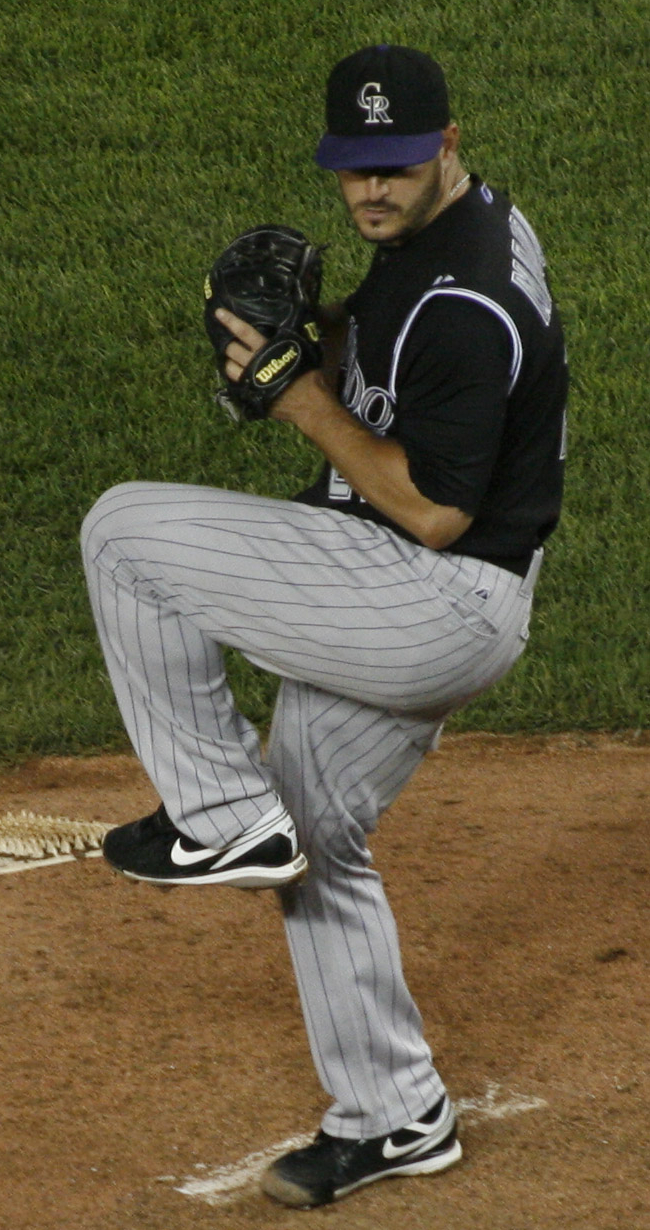
Jason Marquis (1996) won the Silver Slugger Award in 2005.

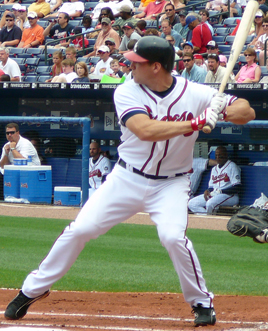
Scott Thorman (2000) was the first player ever drafted out of Canada in the first round of the draft by any team.

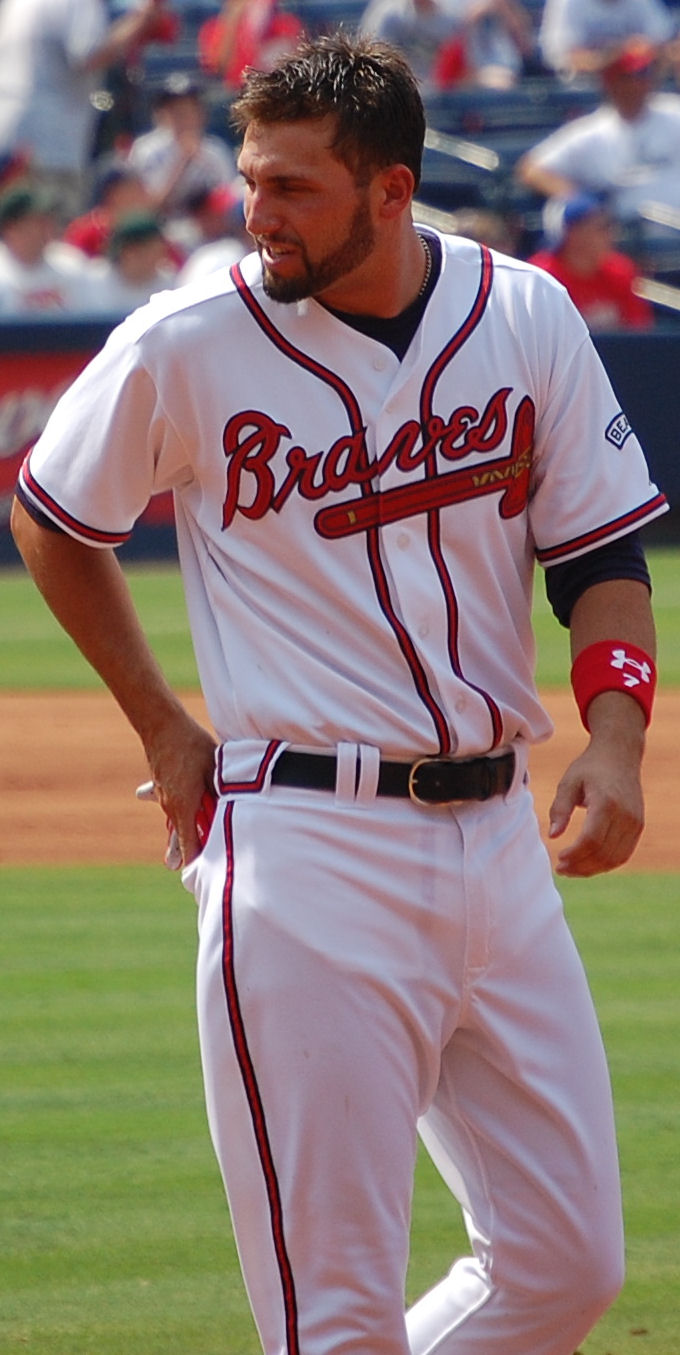
Jeff Francoeur (2002) won a Gold Glove Award in 2007.

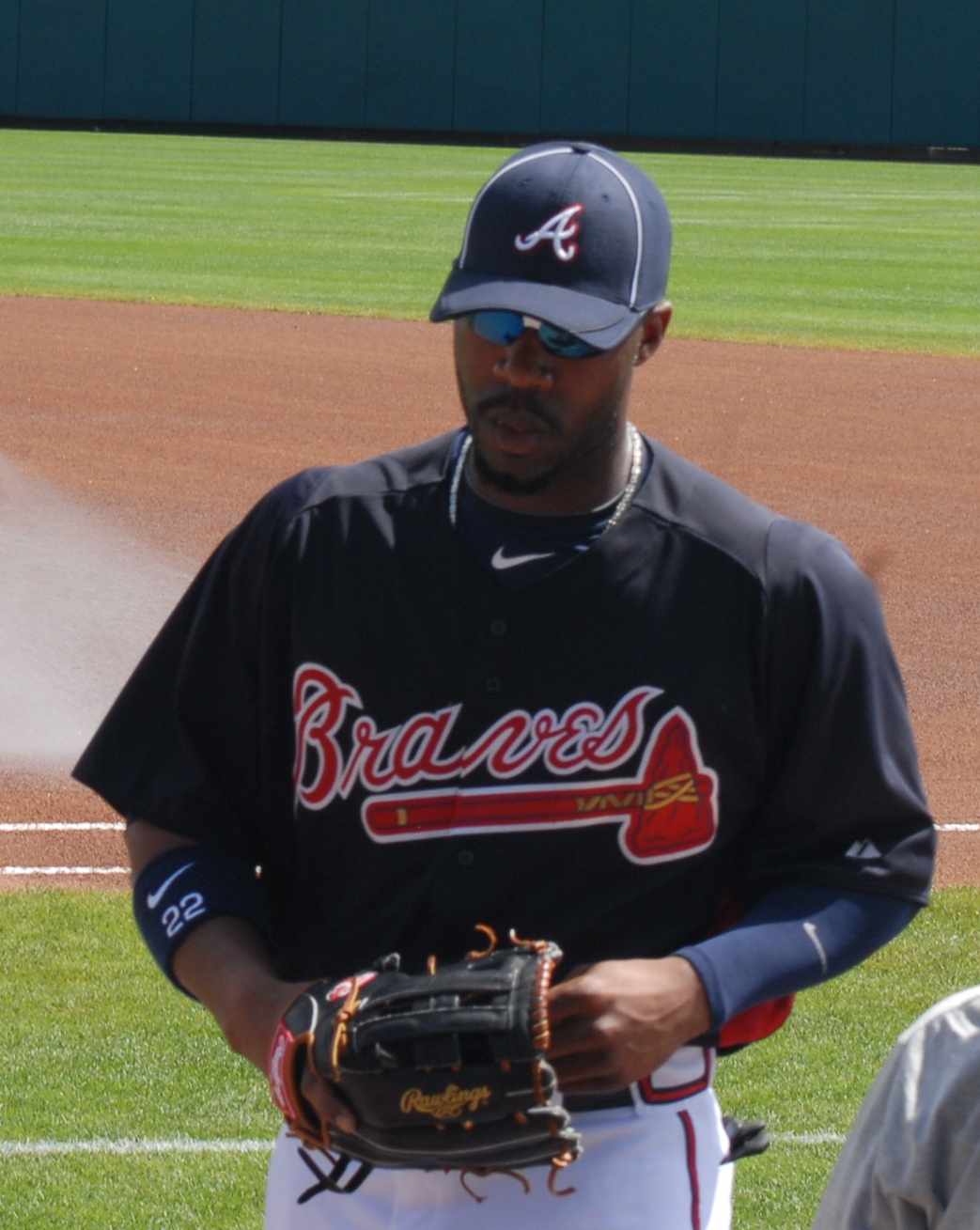
Jason Heyward (2007) was named to the 2010 All-Star Game in his first Major League season.

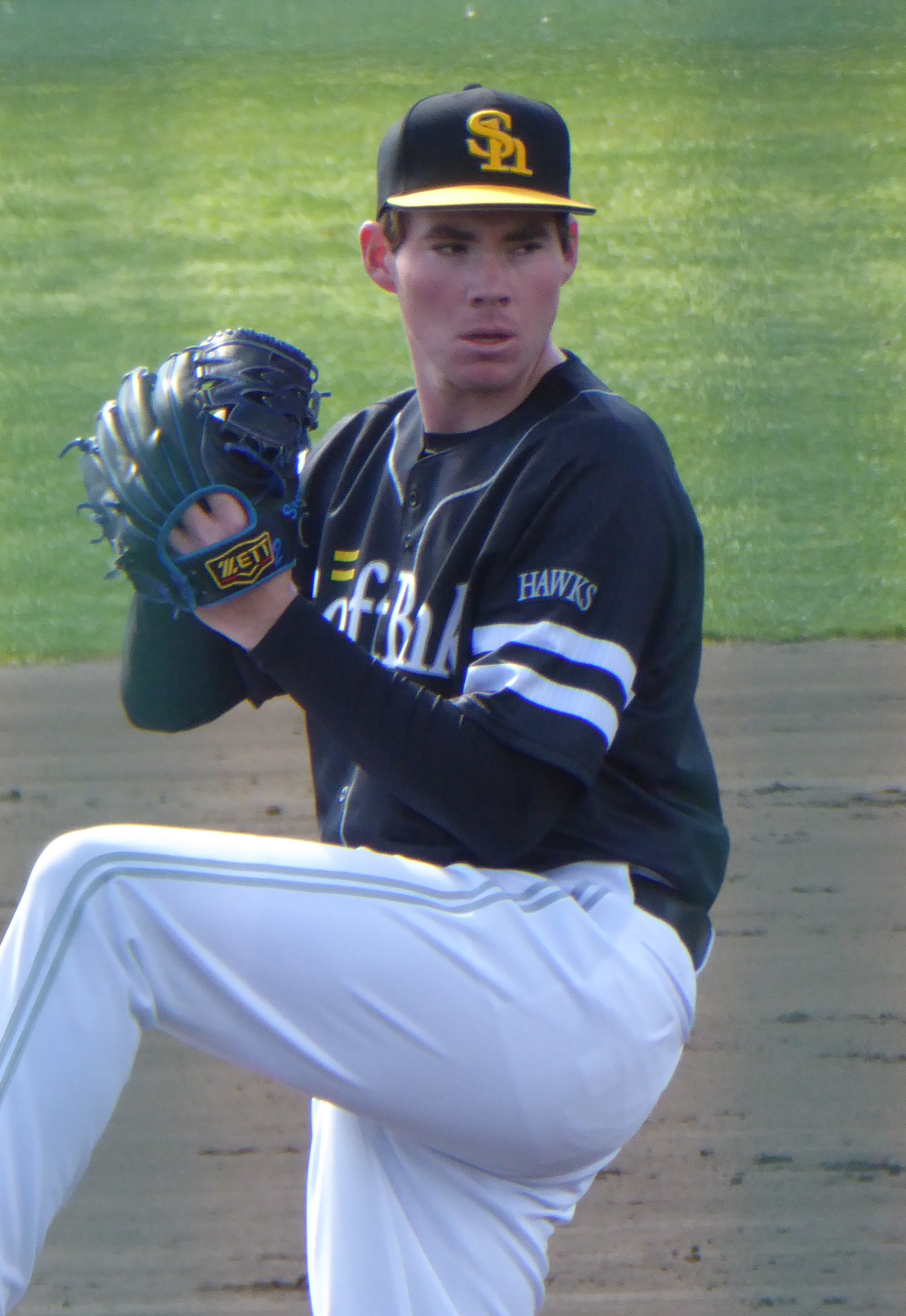
Carter Stewart (2018) made the unprecedented choice to play professionally in Japan rather than to sign a major league contract.

Year	Name	Position	School (location)	Pick	Ref
1965	Dick Grant	First baseman	Watertown High School (Watertown, Massachusetts)	12	
1966	Al Santorini	Right-handed pitcher	Union High School (Union Township, New Jersey)	11	
1967	Andrew Finlay	Outfielder	Luther Burbank High School (Sacramento, California)	12	
1968	Curtis Moore	Outfielder	Denison High School (Denison, Texas)	7	
1969	Gene Holbert	Catcher	Palmyra Area High School (Palmyra, Pennsylvania)	12	
1970	Ron Broaddus	Right-handed pitcher	Brazosport High School (Freeport, Texas)	21	
1971	Taylor Duncan	Shortstop	Grant Union High School (Sacramento, California)	10	
1972	Preston Hanna	Right-handed pitcher	Escambia High School (Pensacola, Florida)	11	
1973	Pat Rockett	Second baseman	Robert E. Lee High School (San Antonio, Texas)	10	
1974	Dale Murphy	Catcher	Woodrow Wilson High School (Portland, Oregon)	5	
1975	Donald Young	Catcher	Dos Pueblos High School (Goleta, California)	18	
1976	Ken Smith	Third baseman	East High School (Youngstown, Ohio)	3	
1977	Tim Cole	Left-handed pitcher	Saugerties High School (Saugerties, New York)	4	
1978	Bob Horner	Third baseman	Arizona State University (Tempe, Arizona)	1	
1979	Brad Komminsk	Outfielder	Shawnee High School (Lima, Ohio)	4	
1980	Ken Dayley	Left-handed pitcher	University of Portland (Portland, Oregon)	3	
1980	Jim Acker	Right-handed pitcher	University of Texas at Austin (Austin, Texas)	21^{[a]}	
1981	Jay Roberts	Outfielder	Centralia High School (Centralia, Washington)	12	
1982	Duane Ward	Right-handed pitcher	Farmington High School (Farmington, New Mexico)	9	
1983	no first-round pick^{[b]}				
1984	Drew Denson	First baseman	Purcell Marian High School (Cincinnati, Ohio)	19	
1985	Tommy Greene	Right-handed pitcher	Whiteville High School (Whiteville, North Carolina)	14	
1986	Kent Mercker '95	Left-handed pitcher	Dublin Coffman High School (Dublin, Ohio)	5	
1987	Derek Lilliquist	Left-handed pitcher	University of Georgia (Athens, Georgia)	6	
1988	Steve Avery '95	Left-handed pitcher	John F. Kennedy High School (Taylor, Michigan)	3	
1989	Tyler Houston	Catcher	Valley High School (Las Vegas, Nevada)	2	
1990	Chipper Jones^{†}'95	Shortstop	Bolles School (Jacksonville, Florida)	1	
1991	Mike Kelly '95	Outfielder	Arizona State University (Tempe, Arizona)	2	
1992	Jamie Arnold	Right-handed pitcher	Osceola High School (Kissimmee, Florida)	21	
1993	no first-round pick^{[c]}				
1994	Jacob Shumate	Right-handed pitcher	Hartsville High School (Hartsville, South Carolina)	27	
1995	Chad Hutchinson*	Right-handed pitcher	Torrey Pines High School (San Diego, California)	26	
1996	A.J. Zapp	First baseman	Center Grove High School (Greenwood, Indiana)	27	
1996	Jason Marquis	Right-handed pitcher	Tottenville High School (Staten Island, New York)	35§^{[d]}	
1997	Troy Cameron	Shortstop	St. Thomas Aquinas High School (Fort Lauderdale, Florida)	29	
1998	no first-round pick^{[e]}				
1999	no first-round pick^{[f]}				
2000	Adam Wainwright	Right-handed pitcher	Glynn Academy (Brunswick, Georgia)	29^{[g]}	
2000	Scott Thorman	Third baseman	Preston High School (Cambridge, Ontario)	30	
2000	Kelly Johnson	Shortstop	Westwood High School (Austin, Texas)	38§^{[h]}	
2000	Aaron Herr	Shortstop	Hempfield High School (Lancaster, Pennsylvania)	40§^{[g]}	
2001	Macay McBride	Left-handed pitcher	Screven County High School (Sylvania, Georgia)	24^{[i]}	
2001	Josh Burrus	Shortstop	Joseph Wheeler High School (Marietta, Georgia)	29	
2001	Richard Lewis	Third baseman	Georgia Institute of Technology (Atlanta, Georgia)	40§^{[i]}	
2002	Jeff Francoeur	Outfielder	Parkview High School (Lilburn, Georgia)	23	
2002	Dan Meyer	Left-handed pitcher	James Madison University (Harrisonburg, Virginia)	34§^{[j]}	
2003	Luis Atilano	Right-handed pitcher	Gabriela Mistral High School (San Juan, Puerto Rico)	35§^{[k]}	
2003	Jarrod Saltalamacchia	Catcher	Royal Palm Beach High School (Royal Palm Beach, Florida)	36§^{[l]}	
2004	no first-round pick^{[m]}				
2005	Joey Devine	Right-handed pitcher	North Carolina State University (Raleigh, North Carolina)	27	
2005	Beau Jones	Left-handed pitcher	Destrehan High School (Destrehan, Louisiana)	41§^{[n]}	
2006	Cody Johnson	Outfielder	A. Crawford Mosley High School (Lynn Haven, Florida)	24	
2006	Cory Rasmus	Right-handed pitcher	Russell County High School (Seale, Alabama)	38§^{[o]}	
2006	Steven Evarts	Left-handed pitcher	Thomas Richard Robinson High School (Tampa, Florida)	43§^{[p]}	
2007	Jason Heyward	Outfielder	Henry County High School (McDonough, Georgia)	14	
2007	Jon Gilmore	Third baseman	Iowa City High School (Iowa City, Iowa)	33§^{[q]}	
2008	Brett DeVall	Left-handed pitcher	Niceville High School (Niceville, Florida)	40§^{[r]}	
2009	Mike Minor	Left-handed pitcher	Vanderbilt University (Nashville, Tennessee)	7	
2010	Matthew Lipka	Shortstop	McKinney High School (McKinney, Texas)	35§^{[s]}	
2011	Sean Gilmartin	Left-handed pitcher	Florida State University (Tallahassee, Florida)	28	
2012	Lucas Sims	Right-handed pitcher	Brookwood High School (Snellville, Georgia)	21	
2013	Jason Hursh	Right-handed pitcher	Oklahoma State University–Stillwater (Stillwater, Oklahoma)	31§^{[t]}	
2014	Braxton Davidson	Outfielder	T. C. Roberson High School (Asheville, North Carolina)	32§^{[u]}	
2015	Kolby Allard	Left-handed pitcher	San Clemente High School (San Clemente, California)	14	
2015	Austin Riley '21	Third baseman	DeSoto Central High School (Southaven, Mississippi)	41§^{[v]}	
2016	Ian Anderson '21	Right-handed pitcher	Shenendehowa High School (Clifton Park, New York)	3	
2016	Joey Wentz	Left-handed pitcher	Shawnee Mission East High School (Prairie Village, Kansas)	40§^{[w]}	
2017	Kyle Wright '21	Right-handed pitcher	Vanderbilt University (Nashville, Tennessee)	5	
2018	Carter Stewart*	Right-handed pitcher	Eau Gallie High School (Melbourne, Florida)	8	
2019	Shea Langeliers	Catcher	Baylor University (Waco, Texas)	9	
2019	Braden Shewmake	Shortstop	Texas A&M University (College Station, Texas)	21	
2020	Jared Shuster	Left-handed pitcher	Wake Forest University (Winston-Salem, North Carolina)	25	
2021	Ryan Cusick	Right-handed pitcher	Wake Forest University (Winston-Salem, North Carolina)	24	
2022	Owen Murphy	Right-handed pitcher	Riverside Brookfield High School (Riverside, Illinois)	20	
2022	JR Ritchie	Right-handed pitcher	Bainbridge High School (Bainbridge Island, Washington)	35§^{[x]}	
2023	Hurston Waldrep	Right-handed pitcher	University of Florida (Gainesville, Florida)	24	
2024	Cam Caminiti	Left-handed pitcher	Saguaro High School (Scottsdale, Arizona)	24	
2025	Tate Southisene	Shortstop	Basic High School (Henderson, Nevada)	22	
2026	AJ Gracia	Outfielder	University of Virginia (Charlottesville, Virginia)	9	
2026	Carter Beck	Outfielder	Indiana State University (Terre Haute, Indiana)	26§	

== Footnotes ==
- ^{V} Through the 2012 season, free agents were evaluated by the Elias Sports Bureau and rated "Type A", "Type B", or not compensation-eligible. If a team offers arbitration to a player but that player refuses and subsequently signs with another team, the original team may receive additional draft picks. If a "Type A" free agent leaves in this way his previous team receives a supplemental pick and a compensation pick from the team with which he signs. If a "Type B" free agent leaves in this way his previous team receives only a supplemental pick. Since the 2013 draft, free agents are no longer classified by type; instead, compensatory picks are only awarded if the team offered its free agent a contract worth at least the average of the 125 current richest MLB contracts. However, if the free agent's last team acquired the player in a trade during the last year of his contract, it is ineligible to receive compensatory picks for that player.
- ^{a} The Braves gained a compensatory first-round pick in 1980 from the Montreal Expos for losing free agent Rowland Office.
- ^{b} The Braves lost their first-round pick in 1983 to the New York Mets as compensation for signing free agent Pete Falcone.
- ^{c} The Braves lost their first-round pick in 1993 to the Chicago Cubs as compensation for signing free agent Greg Maddux.
- ^{d} The Braves gained a supplemental first-round pick in 1996 for failing to sign 1995 first-round pick Chad Hutchinson.
- ^{e} The Braves lost their first-round pick in 1998 to the Colorado Rockies as compensation for signing free agent Andrés Galarraga.
- ^{f} The Braves lost their first-round pick in 1999 to the St. Louis Cardinals as compensation for signing free agent Brian Jordan.
- ^{g} The Braves gained a compensatory and a supplemental first-round pick in 2000 for losing free-agent Russ Springer to the Arizona Diamondbacks.
- ^{h} The Braves gained a supplemental first-round pick in 2000 for losing free agent José Hernández.
- ^{i} The Braves gained a compensatory and a supplemental first-round pick in 2001 for losing free-agent Andy Ashby to the Los Angeles Dodgers.
- ^{j} The Braves gained a supplemental first-round pick in 2002 for losing free agent Steve Karsay.
- ^{k} The Braves lost their original first-round pick in 2003 to the Kansas City Royals as compensation for signing free agent Paul Byrd. They gained a supplemental first-round pick for losing free agent Tom Glavine.
- ^{l} The Braves gained a supplemental first-round pick in 2003 for losing free agent Mike Remlinger.
- ^{m} The Braves lost their first-round pick in 2004 to the Texas Rangers as compensation for signing free agent John Thomson.
- ^{n} The Braves gained a supplemental first-round pick in 2005 for losing free agent Jaret Wright.
- ^{o} The Braves gained a supplemental first-round pick in 2006 for losing free agent Kyle Farnsworth.
- ^{p} The Braves gained a supplemental first-round pick in 2006 for losing free agent Rafael Furcal.
- ^{q} The Braves gained a supplemental first-round pick in 2007 for losing free agent Danys Báez.
- ^{r} The Braves lost their original first-round pick in 2008 to the New York Mets as compensation for signing free agent Tom Glavine. They gained a supplemental first-round pick for losing free agent Ron Mahay.
- ^{s} The Braves lost their original first-round pick in 2010 to the Boston Red Sox as compensation for signing free agent Billy Wagner. They gained a supplemental first-round pick for losing free agent Michael Gonzalez.
- ^{t} The Braves lost their original first-round pick in 2013 to the Tampa Bay Rays as compensation for signing free agent B.J. Upton. They gained a supplemental first-round pick for losing free agent Michael Bourn.
- ^{u} The Braves lost their original first-round pick in 2014 to the Los Angeles Angels as compensation for signing free agent Ervin Santana. They gained a supplemental first-round pick for losing free agent Brian McCann.
- ^{v} The Braves acquired the 41st pick from the San Diego Padres along with Carlos Quentin, Cameron Maybin, Matt Wisler, and Jordan Paroubeck in exchange for Craig Kimbrel and Melvin Upton, Jr.
- ^{w} The Braves acquired the 40th pick from the Miami Marlins in a three-team trade. The Braves also traded Bronson Arroyo, Luis Avilán, Jim Johnson, José Peraza, and Alex Wood to the Los Angeles Dodgers for Héctor Olivera, Paco Rodriguez, and Zach Bird. The Marlins traded Mat Latos and Michael Morse to the Dodgers for Victor Araujo, Jeff Brigham, and Kevin Guzman.
- ^{x} The Braves acquired the 35th pick from the Kansas City Royals in exchange for Drew Waters, Andrew Hoffman, and CJ Alexander.
