= 1995 National League Championship Series =

Team (Wins)	Managers	Season
Atlanta Braves (4)	Bobby Cox	90–54 (.625), GA: 21
Cincinnati Reds (0)	Davey Johnson	85–59 (.590), GA: 9
- Dates: October 10–14
- MVP: Mike Devereaux (Atlanta)
- Umpires: Paul Runge, Jim Quick, Dana DeMuth, Gerry Davis, Randy Marsh, Jerry Crawford

Broadcast
- Television: ABC (Games 1–2); NBC (Games 3–4)
- TV announcers: Al Michaels, Jim Palmer, and Tim McCarver (Games 1–2); Greg Gumbel and Joe Morgan (Games 3–4)
- Radio: CBS
- Radio announcers: Jim Hunter and Jerry Coleman
- NLDS: Cincinnati Reds over Los Angeles Dodgers (3–0); Atlanta Braves over Colorado Rockies (3–1)

The 1995 National League Championship Series (NLCS) was a best-of-seven playoff series in Major League Baseball’s 1995 postseason pitting the NL Central champion Cincinnati Reds against the NL East champion Atlanta Braves for the National League pennant. The Series began on October 10 and ended on October 14. The Reds held home-field advantage due to the predetermined rotation in place from 1995–1997 amongst division champions.

The Braves won the Series in a four-game sweep to become the National League champions, and defeated the American League champion Cleveland Indians in the 1995 World Series.

This NLCS was notable as it matched up what had been the two easternmost teams in the National League West Division from 1969 to 1993, both teams having been placed there at the insistence of the New York Mets and Chicago Cubs (the former team wanted the Cubs' rivals St. Louis Cardinals, then the dominating power of the NL, in the National League East Division, and the Cubs wanted in the same division as St. Louis). It was also the first NLCS since 1989 not to feature either the Philadelphia Phillies or the Pittsburgh Pirates. The two teams reigned exclusively as NL East champions from 1990 to 1993.

== Summary ==
=== Cincinnati Reds vs. Atlanta Braves ===
Atlanta won the series, 4–0.

Game	Date	Score	Location	Time	Attendance
1	October 10	Atlanta Braves – 2, Cincinnati Reds – 1 (11)	Riverfront Stadium	3:18	40,382
2	October 11	Atlanta Braves – 6, Cincinnati Reds – 2 (10)	Riverfront Stadium	3:26	44,624
3	October 13	Cincinnati Reds – 2, Atlanta Braves – 5	Atlanta–Fulton County Stadium	2:42	51,424
4	October 14	Cincinnati Reds – 0, Atlanta Braves – 6	Atlanta–Fulton County Stadium	2:54	52,067

== Game summaries ==
=== Game 1 ===
October 10, 1995 8:10 pm (EDT) at Riverfront Stadium in Cincinnati, Ohio 70 °F (21 °C), clear
Team	1	2	3	4	5	6	7	8	9	10	11	R	H	E
Atlanta	0	0	0	0	0	0	0	0	1	0	1	2	7	0
Cincinnati	0	0	0	1	0	0	0	0	0	0	0	1	8	0
WP: Mark Wohlers (1–0) LP: Mike Jackson (0–1) Sv: Greg McMichael (1); Attendance: 40,382; Boxscore

The opening game of the 1995 NLCS would be well-pitched and decided in extra innings. The only run allowed by Tom Glavine, who would go seven innings, came on a Ron Gant single following a Barry Larkin triple in the fourth. Pete Schourek was lights out the entire game, but allowed back-to-back leadoff singles in the ninth before David Justice hit into a forceout at second to send the game to extra innings. In the 11th inning, bench player Mike Devereaux singled in Fred McGriff, who drew a leadoff walk off of Mike Jackson and moved to third on two groundouts, to give Atlanta a 2–1 lead. Manager Bobby Cox needed to use three pitchers in the bottom of the inning, but Greg McMichael induced a double play with runners on first and third that ended the game.

=== Game 2 ===
October 11, 1995 8:09 pm (EDT) at Riverfront Stadium in Cincinnati, Ohio 73 °F (23 °C), clear
Team	1	2	3	4	5	6	7	8	9	10	R	H	E
Atlanta	1	0	0	1	0	0	0	0	0	4	6	11	1
Cincinnati	0	0	0	0	2	0	0	0	0	0	2	9	1
WP: Greg McMichael (1–0) LP: Mark Portugal (0–1); Home runs: ATL: Javy López (1); CIN: None; Attendance: 44,624; Boxscore

With John Smoltz on the mound, the Braves took an early 1–0 lead when Marquis Grissom hit a leadoff single in the first off of John Smiley, moved to second on a groundout and scored on Chipper Jones's single, then got a second run in the fourth when Fred McGriff hit a leadoff double and scored on a Mike Devereaux RBI double. In the fifth, Lenny Harris's two-out RBI single with two on put the Reds on the board, then Jeff Branson stole home to tie the game at two. That score held until the tenth inning, when the Braves scored four runs and took the game. Cincinnati reliever Mark Portugal's wild pitch with the bases loaded allowed Mark Lemke to scamper home with the go-ahead run. Javy López followed with a three-run blast that blew the game open. This would be the final postseason game ever played in Riverfront Stadium.

=== Game 3 ===
October 13, 1995 8:05 pm (EDT) at Atlanta–Fulton County Stadium in Atlanta, Georgia 70 °F (21 °C), clear
Team	1	2	3	4	5	6	7	8	9	R	H	E
Cincinnati	0	0	0	0	0	0	0	1	1	2	8	0
Atlanta	0	0	0	0	0	3	2	0	X	5	12	1
WP: Greg Maddux (1–0) LP: David Wells (0–1); Home runs: CIN: None; ATL: Charlie O'Brien (1), Chipper Jones (1); Attendance: 51,424; Boxscore

Greg Maddux went eight innings and only gave up one run in another strong start for an Atlanta starter. Lefty David Wells, acquired by Cincinnati in anticipation of facing the predominantly left-handed Braves lineup in the playoffs, matched Maddux with a scoreless first five innings. Later, right-handed Atlanta catcher Charlie O'Brien belted a three-run home run in the sixth off Wells. Rookie Chipper Jones hit a two-run shot in the seventh to make it 5–0. The Reds got on the board in the eighth on three straight one-out singles, the last of which to Hal Morris scoring a run. Jeff Branson led off the ninth with a double, moved to third on a groundout and scored on Thomas Howard's sacrifice fly, as the Braves held on for a 5–2 victory.

=== Game 4 ===
October 14, 1995 8:05 pm (EDT) at Atlanta–Fulton County Stadium in Atlanta, Georgia 62 °F (17 °C), clear
Team	1	2	3	4	5	6	7	8	9	R	H	E
Cincinnati	0	0	0	0	0	0	0	0	0	0	3	1
Atlanta	0	0	1	0	0	0	5	0	X	6	12	1
WP: Steve Avery (1–0) LP: Pete Schourek (0–1); Home runs: CIN: None; ATL: Mike Devereaux (1); Attendance: 52,067; Boxscore

Steve Avery, who was inconsistent all season, got the start for Atlanta and tossed six scoreless innings. Rafael Belliard hit a leadoff single off of Pete Schourek in the third, then moved to second on a fly out before Mark Lemke hit an RBI single to give Atlanta a 1–0 lead. The game remained close until the seventh, when Mike Jackson allowed a leadoff triple and one out walk before a passed ball allowed Marquis Grissom to score. After an intentional walk, series MVP Mike Devereaux hit a three-run home run to put the Braves up 5–0. After a double and intentional walk, Dave Burba relieved Jackson and Luis Polonia's RBI single made it 6–0 Braves. Bobby Cox took no chances and used closer Mark Wohlers to finish off the Reds in the ninth. The shutout victory completed a surprisingly easy sweep of Cincinnati and sent the Braves to their third World Series in five years.

The Reds offense only managed to score five runs in four games off Atlanta's pitching staff, even with the fact that the first two contests went to extra-innings.

This was the only NLCS to end in a four-game sweep until 2007, when the Colorado Rockies defeated the Arizona Diamondbacks in four games.

Former Brave Ron Gant would play against his former team with the Reds, then again the next year as a member of the St. Louis Cardinals.

This was the final game for manager Davey Johnson with the Reds.

== Composite box ==
1995 NLCS (4–0): Atlanta Braves over Cincinnati Reds

Team	1	2	3	4	5	6	7	8	9	10	11	R	H	E
Atlanta Braves	1	0	1	1	0	3	7	0	1	4	1	19	42	3
Cincinnati Reds	0	0	0	1	2	0	0	1	1	0	0	5	28	2
Total attendance: 188,497 Average attendance: 47,124

== Aftermath ==
Two weeks later, the Braves defeated another Ohio-based team in the World Series, the Cleveland Indians, in six games. It was their first World Series victory in Atlanta.

The 1995 season for the Reds proved to be successful, despite dysfunction from the beginning. Reds owner Marge Schott announced early in the 1995 season that manager Davey Johnson would not return in 1996, regardless of how the Reds did. Schott named former Reds third baseman Ray Knight (who had played for Johnson on the '86 Mets championship team) as bench coach, with the understanding that he would take over as manager in 1996. The Reds took a dive under Ray Knight in 1996 and he was eventually fired in 1997. Johnson was quickly hired to manage the Baltimore Orioles for the 1996 season, but would find himself in another tenuous situation, as he and Orioles owner Peter Angelos would not get along. Similar to his situation with Marge Schott, Johnson would be fired after the 1997 season despite two AL Championship Series appearances. Meanwhile, Schott was banned from day-to-day operations of the Reds by MLB from 1996 through 1998 due to statements in support of German domestic policies of Nazi Party leader Adolf Hitler, amongst other controversies over her own personal beliefs; shortly afterwards, she sold the majority of her share in the team in 1999.

The Reds promptly floundered for the next fifteen years, missing the playoffs each year until 2010. The Reds also have not won a postseason series since beating the Dodgers to advance to the NLCS in 1995, which is the currently longest postseason series winning drought in MLB.

In their first postseason match-up since 1995, Atlanta would again sweep Cincinnati in the National League Wild Card Series in 2020.
