= Matt Murray (baseball) =

American baseball player (1970–2025)

- Pitcher
- Born: September 26, 1970; Boston, Massachusetts, U.S.
- Died: June 22, 2025 (aged 54); Calhoun, Georgia, U.S.
- Batted: Left Threw: Right

MLB debut
- August 12, 1995, for the Atlanta Braves

Last MLB appearance
- September 25, 1995, for the Boston Red Sox

MLB statistics
- Win–loss record: 0–3
- Earned run average: 9.64
- Strikeouts: 4

CPBL statistics
- Innings pitched: 2
- Earned run average: 9.00
- Strikeouts: 2
- Stats at Baseball Reference

Teams
- Atlanta Braves (1995); Boston Red Sox (1995); Brother Elephants (1997)

Matthew Michael Murray (September 26, 1970 – June 22, 2025) was an American professional baseball pitcher. He played in Major League Baseball for the Atlanta Braves and Boston Red Sox during the 1995 season. Listed at 6 ft 6 in (198 cm), 240 lb (110 kg), he batted left-handed and threw right-handed.

== Biography ==
Murray entered the majors in 1995 with the Braves, appearing in four games before being traded on August 31 to Boston as the player to be named later to complete an earlier trade where the Red Sox acquired Mike Stanton.

Overall Murray posted a 0–3 record with four strikeouts and a 9.64 ERA in six appearances, including two starts, and 14 total innings of work.

Despite trading Murray, the Braves, having won the 1995 World Series, awarded Murray a World Series ring.

Murray died on June 22, 2025, at the age of 54.

== See also ==
- 1995 Atlanta Braves season
- 1995 Boston Red Sox season
