= Tom Thobe =

American baseball player

- Pitcher
- Born: September 3, 1969 (age 56); Covington, Kentucky, U.S.
- Batted: Left Threw: Left

MLB debut
- September 12, 1995, for the Atlanta Braves

Last MLB appearance
- April 25, 1996, for the Atlanta Braves

MLB statistics
- Win–loss record: 0–1
- Earned run average: 4.87
- Strikeouts: 3
- Stats at Baseball Reference

Teams
- Atlanta Braves (1995–1996)

Thomas Neal Thobe (born September 3, 1969) is an American former baseball pitcher who played in Major League Baseball for the Atlanta Braves.

== Early life ==
Thobe was born on September 3, 1969, in Covington, Kentucky. His father, Jack Thobe, had played for the Akron Goodyear Wingfoots.

== Career ==
Thobe was drafted in the 38th round of the 1987 Major League Baseball draft by the Chicago Cubs out of Edison High School in Huntington Beach, California. He was assigned to the Wytheville Cubs of the Appalachian League to begin his professional career in 1988. After one year in Chicago's farm system, he quit baseball and returned home to Southern California where he entered the workforce. Four years later, as a favor to his mother, he attended a tryout with an Atlanta Braves scout and was signed to a minor league deal. He worked his way through their minor league system and made his Major League debut in 1995.
