= Pedro Borbón Jr. =

Dominican baseball player (born 1967)

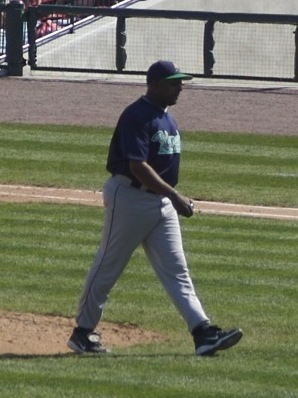
- Borbón with the Cedar Rapids Kernels in 2007
- Pitcher
- Born: November 15, 1967 (age 57); Mao, Dominican Republic
- Batted: Right Threw: Left

MLB debut
- October 2, 1992, for the Atlanta Braves

Last MLB appearance
- August 15, 2003, for the St. Louis Cardinals

MLB statistics
- Win–loss record: 16–16
- Earned run average: 4.68
- Strikeouts: 224
- Stats at Baseball Reference

Teams
- Atlanta Braves (1992–1993, 1995–1996); Los Angeles Dodgers (1999); Toronto Blue Jays (2000–2002); Houston Astros (2002); St. Louis Cardinals (2003)

Career highlights and awards
- World Series champion (1995)

Pedro Félix Borbón Marte (born November 15, 1967), generally known as Pedro Borbón Jr., is a Dominican former professional baseball pitcher who played in Major League Baseball (MLB) for five teams, over nine seasons. Borbón was mainly a relief pitcher.

Borbón's father, Pedro Borbón was also a pitcher, playing for the Cincinnati Reds and three other teams from 1969 to 1980, winning the World Series twice with the Cincinnati Reds.

After his parents divorced when he was 13, young Pedro Borbón left home at 14 and settled in New York City with two of his mother's brothers. In the spring of his freshman year at DeWitt Clinton High School in the Bronx, Borbón cut class, heading for the lunch room. He was stopped by a security guard, who asked to see his student ID. The guard did a double-take when he saw the name. "Are you related to Pedro Borbón, the pitcher?" he asked. The guard also happened to be a baseball coach at the school. He asked Borbón if he played baseball and refused to take "no" for an answer. He took Borbón outside and had him throw 20 pitches. By Borbón's recollection, 18 were strikes. Borbón pitched well enough to earn an athletic scholarship to Ranger Junior College outside Houston but not before parting with his uncles and living for a while in a cheap apartment in the Bronx with two high school buddies that cost them $540 a month. He worked as a messenger after school to pay his third of the rent. He had no contact with his father between the ages of 13 and 20.

Borbón played on the 1995 Atlanta Braves, who won the World Series that year. He pitched one important inning in the 1995 World Series. The Braves were leading two games to one over the Cleveland Indians, and were leading the fourth game going into the ninth inning. However, Braves' closer Mark Wohlers was fatigued after having pitched two and two-thirds innings the previous day. Wohlers allowed the Indians to score a run and put a runner on second in that ninth inning without recording any outs. Borbón then came in to relieve Wohlers, and promptly struck out Jim Thome and Sandy Alomar Jr. while getting Kenny Lofton to fly out to right.

Borbón is right-handed but taught himself to throw left-handed to increase his marketability as a pitcher.

== Personal life ==
Borbón is the brother-in-law of major league outfielder Carlos Peguero, who is married to sister Maria Jacqueline (née Borbón) Peguero. Borbón was one of three Atlanta Braves to appear on Saturday Night Live when he made a cameo appearance alongside teammates Gerald Williams and Mark Wohlers.

== See also ==
- List of second-generation Major League Baseball players
