= José Oliva =

Dominican baseball player (1971–1997)

Jose Oliva
- First baseman / Third baseman
- Born: March 3, 1971; San Pedro de Macorís, Dominican Republic
- Died: December 22, 1997 (aged 26); San Cristóbal, Dominican Republic
- Batted: Right Threw: Right

Professional debut
- MLB: July 1, 1994, for the Atlanta Braves
- CPBL: April 3, 1997, for the Brother Elephants

Last appearance
- MLB: October 1, 1995, for the St. Louis Cardinals
- CPBL: October 4, 1997, for the Brother Elephants

MLB statistics
- Batting average: .178
- Home runs: 13
- Runs batted in: 31

CPBL statistics
- Batting average: .311
- Home runs: 25
- Runs batted in: 81
- Stats at Baseball Reference

Teams
- Atlanta Braves (1994–1995); St. Louis Cardinals (1995); Brother Elephants (1997)

José Oliva (March 3, 1971 – December 22, 1997) was a Dominican professional baseball player who played in the Major Leagues primarily as a third baseman from 1994 to 1995. Oliva had three daughters, Laura Oliva, Tiana Oliva, and Yeika Oliva. On December 22, 1997, Oliva died from multiple injuries when his car overturned along the San Cristóbal highway in the Dominican Republic. Oliva was the last St. Louis Cardinal to wear jersey number 42, which has since been retired league-wide by Major League Baseball in honor of Jackie Robinson.

== See also ==
- List of baseball players who died during their careers

Awards
Preceded by Mike Lansing	Topps Rookie All-Star Third Baseman; 1994	Succeeded by Chipper Jones
