= Mike Kelly (outfielder) =

American baseball player (born 1970)

- Outfielder
- Born: June 2, 1970 (age 56); Los Angeles, California, U.S.
- Batted: Right Threw: Right

MLB debut
- April 5, 1994, for the Atlanta Braves

Last MLB appearance
- April 12, 1999, for the Colorado Rockies

MLB statistics
- Batting average: .241
- Home runs: 22
- Runs batted in: 86
- Stats at Baseball Reference

Teams
- Atlanta Braves (1994–1995); Cincinnati Reds (1996–1997); Tampa Bay Devil Rays (1998); Colorado Rockies (1999)

Career highlights and awards
- Golden Spikes Award (1991)

Michael Raymond Kelly (born June 2, 1970) is an American former Major League Baseball outfielder for the Atlanta Braves, Cincinnati Reds, Tampa Bay Devil Rays, and Colorado Rockies.

== Amateur career ==
Kelly attended Los Alamitos High School in Los Alamitos, California and Arizona State University. In his 1990 season with the Sun Devils, he hit .376 with 21 HR and 82 RBI. As a result of his fine season with Arizona State, he won the Golden Spikes Award as the 1990 National Player of the Year. His 46 homers with ASU trail only Bob Horner for most all-time in Sun Devil history. After the 1990 season, he played collegiate summer baseball with the Orleans Cardinals of the Cape Cod Baseball League and was named a league all-star.

== Professional career ==
Kelly was drafted 2nd overall by the Atlanta Braves in the 1991 amateur draft, and spent 6 years in the majors with 4 teams. He played in 327 major league games, hitting .241 with 22 home runs and 86 RBI. His best season came in 1998 with Tampa Bay. In 106 games he hit .240 with career highs in both homers (10) and RBI (33). Kelly will be remembered by Rays fans as being the starting left fielder for the team's first game in major league history.

Kelly retired from the Yankees organization following the 2004 season after being released.
