= Mike Devereaux =

American baseball player (born 1963)

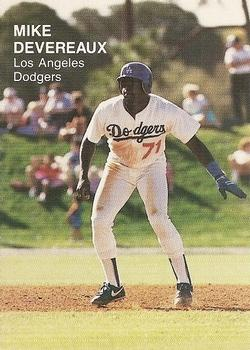
- Outfielder
- Born: April 10, 1963 (age 63); Casper, Wyoming, U.S.
- Batted: Right Threw: Right

MLB debut
- September 2, 1987, for the Los Angeles Dodgers

Last MLB appearance
- April 17, 1998, for the Los Angeles Dodgers

MLB statistics
- Batting average: .254
- Home runs: 105
- Runs batted in: 480
- Stats at Baseball Reference

Teams
- Los Angeles Dodgers (1987–1988); Baltimore Orioles (1989–1994); Chicago White Sox (1995); Atlanta Braves (1995); Baltimore Orioles (1996); Texas Rangers (1997); Los Angeles Dodgers (1998)

Career highlights and awards
- World Series champion (1995); NLCS MVP (1995); Baltimore Orioles Hall of Fame

Michael Devereaux (born April 10, 1963) is an American former professional baseball outfielder. He played in Major League Baseball (MLB) for the Los Angeles Dodgers, Baltimore Orioles, Chicago White Sox, Atlanta Braves, and Texas Rangers. He was drafted by the Dodgers in the 5th round of the 1985 MLB draft, and made his debut in 1987. With Atlanta in 1995, he was named the NLCS MVP, and won the 1995 World Series.

== Early life ==
Devereaux was born in Casper, Wyoming. He went to Kelly Walsh High School in Casper. He played collegiately at Mesa Community College and Arizona State University, where he earned a Bachelor of Arts degree in finance.

== Career highlights ==
Devereaux was acquired by the Orioles from the Dodgers for Mike Morgan on March 11, 1989. The peak of his career was from 1989 to 1993, with his best season coming in 1992 with the Orioles, when he played in 159 games, with 24 home runs, 107 RBIs and a .276 batting average. Devereaux won the 1995 NLCS MVP award with the Atlanta Braves by driving in the game-winning RBI in the 11th inning of Game One and hitting a three-run home run in Game Four against Cincinnati. The Braves went on to defeat the Cleveland Indians in the World Series.

On July 15, 1989, Devereaux hit a walk-off home run in an 11-9 win against the California Angels. The call was controversial, as the home run ball came extremely close to the foul pole. Angels manager Doug Rader argued the call with umpire Ken Kaiser the following day and was ejected prior to the start of the next game.

Devereaux played his final MLB game with his original team, the Dodgers, on April 17, 1998. In 12 seasons, he had a .254 batting average, and hit 105 home runs with 480 RBIs, three grand slams, 635 strikeouts, 85 stolen bases, and 29 errors. He is second in career home runs by a player born in Wyoming (only John Buck has more).

In March 2021, the Baltimore Orioles announced that Devereaux had been elected to the Orioles Hall of Fame. He was one of four inductees honored with an on-field ceremony prior to the Orioles game on August 7, 2021.

== Post-playing career ==
Devereaux served as field coach for the Delmarva Shorebirds (Baltimore Orioles Single-A Affiliate, South Atlantic League) in 2010, replacing former third baseman Ryan Minor, who had been promoted to team manager. Devereaux was the field coach for the Frederick Keys (Baltimore Orioles Single-A Affiliate, Carolina League) in 2011. He was the hitting coach for the Asheville Tourists (Colorado Rockies Single-A affiliate, South Atlantic League) from the 2012 season through the 2016 season, after which in 2017 he was assigned to the Boise Hawks, the Rockies' affiliate in the Low-A Northwest League. For the 2018 season, he was the hitting coach for the Cincinnati Reds' Double-A affiliate, the Pensacola Blue Wahoos of the Southern League. Devereaux was the 2019 hitting coach with the Single-A Dayton Dragons, a Reds affiliate. As of August 2021, Devereaux was working as a roving hitting, outfield, and base running coach at IMG Academy in Bradenton, Florida. Devereaux worked for the Orioles as a guest instructor at spring training in February, 2023. He joined MASN as a part-time game analyst on Orioles telecasts on June 30, 2023. He is scheduled to be a broadcaster on two Orioles home series in July and August 2023.
