= Kent Mercker =

American baseball player (born 1968)

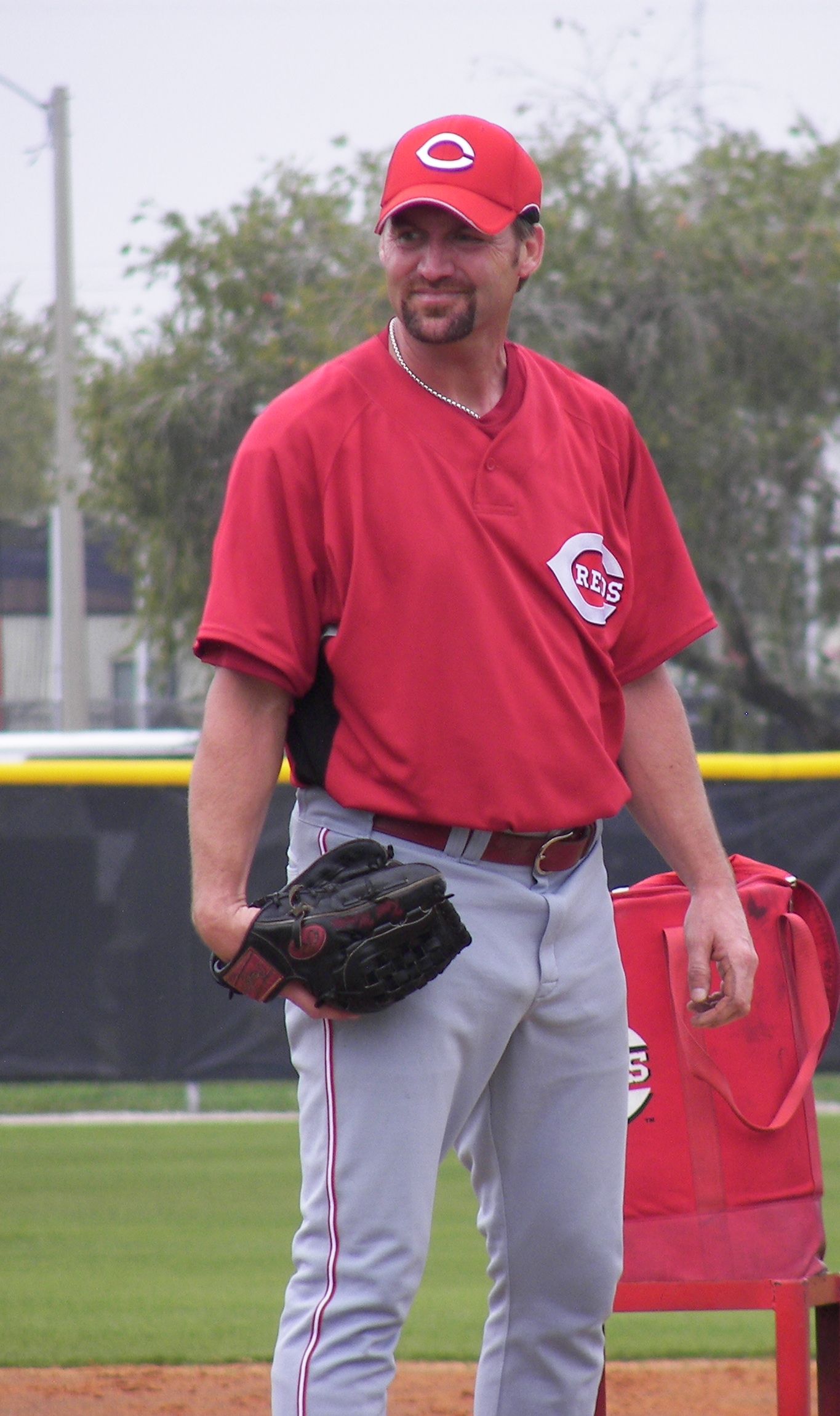
- Mercker with the Cincinnati Reds in 2008
- Pitcher
- Born: February 1, 1968 (age 58); Brownsburg, Indiana, U.S.
- Batted: Left Threw: Left

MLB debut
- September 22, 1989, for the Atlanta Braves

Last MLB appearance
- May 30, 2008, for the Cincinnati Reds

MLB statistics
- Win–loss record: 74–67
- Earned run average: 4.16
- Strikeouts: 917
- Stats at Baseball Reference

Teams
- Atlanta Braves (1989–1995); Baltimore Orioles (1996); Cleveland Indians (1996); Cincinnati Reds (1997); St. Louis Cardinals (1998–1999); Boston Red Sox (1999); Anaheim Angels (2000); Colorado Rockies (2002); Cincinnati Reds (2003); Atlanta Braves (2003); Chicago Cubs (2004); Cincinnati Reds (2005–2006, 2008)

Career highlights and awards
- World Series champion (1995); Pitched a no-hitter on April 8, 1994; Pitched a combined no-hitter on September 11, 1991

Kent Franklin Mercker (born February 1, 1968) is an American former Major League Baseball left-handed pitcher. He played for nine teams over his 17-year career.

== Career ==
Mercker was born in Brownsburg, Indiana, and lived in several different cities, including four years in Export, Pennsylvania, before his family settled in Dublin, Ohio in 1980. He was taken in the first round (5th pick overall) of the 1986 Major League Baseball draft by the Atlanta Braves. He made his major league debut with the Braves on September 22, 1989, and appeared in two games that season. During his years with the Braves, Mercker split time between the bullpen and the starting rotation. After serving as a reliever for the vast part of his first five seasons, he joined the Braves' rotation full-time for the 1994 and 1995 seasons.

After the 1995 season, the Braves traded Mercker to the Baltimore Orioles. Mercker then became a journeyman, spending time with Baltimore (1996), Cleveland (1996), Cincinnati (1997, 2003, 2005-2006, 2008), St. Louis (1998-1999), Boston (1999), Anaheim (2000), Colorado (2002), Atlanta (2003), and the Chicago Cubs (2004). He signed with Cincinnati for the third time in his career on December 20, 2004.

Mercker received the Tony Conigliaro Award in 2000 following his recovery from a cerebral hemorrhage.

Mercker has taken part in two no-hit games during his career, both with the Braves. The first, on September 11, 1991, against the San Diego Padres at Fulton County Stadium, was a combined effort between Mercker, the starter, who pitched six innings; Mark Wohlers, who pitched the seventh and eighth innings; and Alejandro Peña, who pitched the ninth. The Braves defeated the Padres 1–0. The 13th no-hitter in Braves franchise history, attendance was 20,477 at Fulton-County Stadium.

The second no-hitter was a solo effort by Mercker, as he no-hit the Los Angeles Dodgers on April 8, 1994, at Dodger Stadium in a 6–0 victory. To date, this no-hitter is the last to be pitched by a Brave.

On February 8, 2008, Mercker signed a minor league contract with Cincinnati with an invitation to spring training. He pitched in 15 games for the Reds that season.

From 2009 to 2012, he worked as a broadcaster for the Reds.

Mercker played in the 2022 Minto U.S. Open Pickleball Championships.

== See also ==
- List of Major League Baseball no-hitters
- List of players named in the Mitchell Report

Achievements
Preceded by Bret Saberhagen	No-hit game September 11, 1991 (with Mark Wohlers & Alejandro Peña)	Succeeded by Kevin Gross
Preceded by Darryl Kile	No-hitter pitcher April 8, 1994	Succeeded by Scott Erickson
