= Mark Wohlers =

American baseball player (born 1970)

- Pitcher
- Born: January 23, 1970 (age 56); Holyoke, Massachusetts, U.S.
- Batted: Right Threw: Right

MLB debut
- August 17, 1991, for the Atlanta Braves

Last MLB appearance
- September 28, 2002, for the Cleveland Indians

MLB statistics
- Win–loss record: 39–29
- Earned run average: 3.97
- Strikeouts: 557
- Saves: 119
- Stats at Baseball Reference

Teams
- Atlanta Braves (1991–1999); Cincinnati Reds (2000–2001); New York Yankees (2001); Cleveland Indians (2002)

Career highlights and awards
- All-Star (1996); World Series champion (1995); Pitched a combined no-hitter on September 11, 1991

Mark Edward Wohlers (born January 23, 1970) is an American former professional baseball pitcher. A right-hander, he played all or parts of 12 seasons in Major League Baseball, exclusively as a relief pitcher. He is best known for his years with the Atlanta Braves from 1991 to 1999. He was on the mound when the Braves won the 1995 World Series over the Cleveland Indians.

== Early life ==
Wohlers grew up "dirt poor" in Holyoke, Massachusetts. His parents divorced when he was nine years old and he was raised primarily by his mother, Irene. He began working at fourteen years old, washing dishes in a restaurant until midnight. Wohlers committed to play college baseball for the Maine Black Bears before graduating from Holyoke High School in 1988.

== Career ==
Wohlers was selected in the eighth round of the 1988 amateur draft by the Braves. He went on to make his major league debut with the Braves on August 17, 1991. On September 11, Wohlers teamed with fellow Braves hurlers Kent Mercker and Alejandro Peña for a combined no-hitter against the San Diego Padres; Wohlers pitched two innings in relief of Mercker. The 13th no-hitter in Braves franchise history, attendance was 20,477 at Fulton-County Stadium in the 1–0 shutout win.

After spending the following three seasons as a setup pitcher, Wohlers was given the job as a closer in 1995. He went on to record 97 saves over the next three seasons, also saving the 1–0 victory in the clinching Game 6 of the 1995 World Series, establishing himself as one of the best closers in the majors.

In Game 4 of the 1996 World Series against the New York Yankees, Wohlers gave up a 3-run home run to Jim Leyritz which tied the game at 6. After this, the momentum of the Series shifted and the Yankees won it in six games. Subsequently, in 1998, he seemed to lose all ability to control his pitches. He spent part of the season at Triple-A Richmond, but still finished the season with a major league earned run average of 10.18. His control problems were dramatic. In 20 1/3 major league innings, Wohlers walked 33 batters. After being sent down to Triple-A, Wohlers walked 36 batters in only 12 1/3 innings. His symptoms were a prime example of what is commonly known as Steve Blass disease – a psychological block which manifests itself when baseball players overthink the act of throwing a baseball and consequently become unable to throw with any sort of control. The Associated Press called him "the 1990s poster child for Steve Blass disease."

He began the following season in a similar fashion: in two outings he recorded an ERA of 27.00 in 2/3 of an inning, with 6 walks. The Atlanta faithful, although frustrated with Wohlers' seemingly constant fastballs to the backstop or behind batters, rallied behind the embattled pitcher and would fervently cheer him on whenever he was in the game. After being recalled from Richmond, he entered a game and recorded a strikeout, his first in months, and received a rousing standing ovation from the crowd at Turner Field.

On April 16, 1999, the Braves traded Wohlers to the Cincinnati Reds in return for John Hudek. The day after signing for the Reds he was put on the disabled list with an anxiety disorder. While undergoing treatment for his anxiety, Wohlers had Tommy John surgery on his elbow, which ended his season. Wohlers returned to baseball for the 2000 season in his old role as a setup man. He split the following season between the Reds and the Yankees before being traded to the Cleveland Indians prior to the 2002 season.

In his first season with the Indians, Wohlers recorded an ERA of 4.79, with seven saves, three wins, four losses, and a much improved walk ratio. After experiencing pain in his right elbow in spring training before the 2003 season, Wohlers had an operation to remove several bone chips, ruling him out for the first two months of the season. His season ended in the second game of his rehabilitation assignment at Double-A Akron when he ruptured the tendon graft he had had in his elbow in 1999. He had Tommy John surgery for the second time in August of that year, which should have allowed him to return for the 2004 season. However, Wohlers decided not to return for personal reasons and was released by the Indians. He did not return to baseball, although he never formally announced his retirement. His career record is 39–29 with an ERA of 3.97 and 119 saves.

== Personal life ==
Wohlers's first wife, Nancy, filed for divorce in Fulton County Superior Court in July 1998. Their daughter, Austyn, was born in 1996.

In the early morning of March 1, 2011, Wohlers' home in Milton, Georgia, caught fire, burnt down in under an hour, and was considered a "total loss" by the local fire department; however, some of Wohlers's sports memorabilia was recovered from his basement. He has credited his wife, Kimberly, with getting him, his two sons, and youngest daughter out of the house in time. His eldest daughter was not present at the time of the fire.

Wohlers and his wife later ran an Atlanta real estate business called Team Wohlers, at Solid Source Realty.

== In popular culture ==
Wohlers was one of three Atlanta Braves to appear on Saturday Night Live when he made a cameo appearance alongside teammates Gerald Williams and Pedro Borbón, Jr. on the December 13, 1997, episode hosted by Helen Hunt.

== See also ==
- List of Major League Baseball single-inning strikeout leaders

Preceded by Bret Saberhagen	No-hit game September 11, 1991 (with Kent Mercker & Alejandro Peña)	Succeeded by Kevin Gross
