= Greg McMichael =

American baseball player (born 1966)

- Relief pitcher
- Born: December 1, 1966 (age 59); Knoxville, Tennessee, U.S.
- Batted: Right Threw: Right

MLB debut
- April 12, 1993, for the Atlanta Braves

Last MLB appearance
- May 27, 2000, for the Atlanta Braves

MLB statistics
- Win–loss record: 31–29
- Earned run average: 3.25
- Strikeouts: 459
- Stats at Baseball Reference

Teams
- Atlanta Braves (1993–1996); New York Mets (1997–1998); Los Angeles Dodgers (1998); New York Mets (1998–1999); Oakland Athletics (1999); Atlanta Braves (2000)

Career highlights and awards
- World Series champion (1995)

Gregory Winston McMichael (born December 1, 1966) is an American former professional baseball player who was a relief pitcher in Major League Baseball (MLB) from 1993 to 2000.

Born in Knoxville, Tennessee, McMichael graduated from Webb School of Knoxville in 1985 and played college ball at the University of Tennessee before joining Major League Baseball. He was drafted by the Cleveland Indians in June 1988 and played for that team's minor league affiliates during the 1988, 1989, and 1990 seasons. The Indians released him in April 1991, whereupon he signed with the Atlanta Braves organization. He played two seasons for Braves minor league teams before being called up to the major leagues for the 1993 season.

In 1993, his first season with the Atlanta Braves, he became a closer at mid-season and went on to compile a record of 19 saves, with an earned-run average of 2.06. After that season, when the Braves won the National League West division title, he placed second in balloting for National League Rookie of the Year, a title that was won by Mike Piazza.

McMichael played for the Braves through the 1996 season, including pitching in the World Series in both 1995 (when the Braves won) and 1996. However, he was traded to the New York Mets for the 1997 season. His career with the Mets was interrupted in 1998 when he was traded to the Los Angeles Dodgers, but he returned to the Mets about one month later in a subsequent trade. He started the 1999 season as a member of the Mets organization, but was placed on the disabled list during spring training due to tendinitis in his shoulder, then spent the some time in the minor leagues before returning to the Mets roster. Later in the 1999 season he went to the Oakland Athletics in a trade. After that season he underwent arthroscopic surgery on his shoulder and was released from his contract, making him a free agent. He rejoined the Braves in 2000, playing in 16 games before incurring a rotator cuff injury that forced him to retire.
