= Steve Avery (baseball) =

American baseball player (born 1970)

- Pitcher
- Born: April 14, 1970 (age 56); Trenton, Michigan, U.S.
- Batted: Left Threw: Left

MLB debut
- June 13, 1990, for the Atlanta Braves

Last MLB appearance
- July 20, 2003, for the Detroit Tigers

MLB statistics
- Win–loss record: 96–83
- Earned run average: 4.19
- Strikeouts: 980
- Stats at Baseball Reference

Teams
- Atlanta Braves (1990–1996); Boston Red Sox (1997–1998); Cincinnati Reds (1999); Detroit Tigers (2003)

Career highlights and awards
- All-Star (1993); World Series champion (1995); NLCS MVP (1991)

Steven Thomas Avery (born April 14, 1970) is an American former professional baseball left-handed pitcher. He played in Major League Baseball (MLB) for the Atlanta Braves, Boston Red Sox, Cincinnati Reds and Detroit Tigers.

== Career ==
=== Atlanta Braves ===
Avery was the third overall selection by Atlanta in the 1988 MLB draft. He made his first career start on June 13, 1990, against the Cincinnati Reds at Riverfront Stadium, giving up eight runs in 2 1/3 innings. He finished his rookie year with a record of 3–11 in 21 starts with a 5.64 ERA. The pitching staff of Avery, Tom Glavine, John Smoltz, and Pete Smith were dubbed Atlanta's "Young Guns".

=== 1991 ===
The 1991 season was a good year for both Avery and his team. The team went from worst to first in the NL West while Avery compiled a record of 18–8 with a 3.38 ERA. He gave the Braves their first win of the season, a 7–5 victory over the defending World Champion Cincinnati Reds. In the heat of a September pennant race with the Los Angeles Dodgers, the 21-year-old Avery beat them twice, 9–1 at home on September 15, and 3–0 on the road on September 20, pitching a complete game both times. Avery's last win of the regular season was a stellar performance against the Houston Astros. On October 4, Avery threw a no-hitter for 6 2/3 innings until Luis Gonzalez broke it up with a single. His amazing season continued with one of the greatest postseason performances in history. He shut out the Pittsburgh Pirates for 16 2/3 innings over two games and accumulated two 1–0 wins. His performance earned him MVP honors for the 1991 NLCS. In the 1991 World Series, Avery earned no decisions in two starts but pitched effectively in both Game Three and Game Six.

=== Continued success ===
In 1992, Avery lowered his ERA to 3.20, but his record fell off to 11–11, mostly due to the Braves inability to score runs when he pitched. However, his playoff success continued when he took the mound against the Pirates in the 1992 NLCS. He extended his mastery over the Pittsburgh offense to 22 1/3 shutout innings before giving up five runs in the seventh inning of a Braves rout in Game Two. After lasting only 1/3 of an inning and giving up four runs in his second start in Game Five, Avery kept the Pirates at bay in the crucial middle innings of Game Seven in relief of John Smoltz. Avery's clutch performance kept the game close enough for Francisco Cabrera to perform his game-winning heroics in the ninth inning, when he cracked a two-run single that scored David Justice and Sid Bream.

Avery started Game Three of the 1992 World Series and was the losing pitcher in the first World Series game ever played outside the United States. He pitched effectively but lost, 3–2, to the Toronto Blue Jays. In Game Six, he was pulled after giving up a home run to Candy Maldonado in the fourth inning. Avery appeared on his way to another loss, but a Braves rally extended the game into the eleventh inning before the Blue Jays prevailed, winning their first World Series and saddling the hard-luck Braves with their second consecutive World Series defeat.

=== Unexpected decline ===
In 1993, Avery had the best season of his career. He was selected to the All-Star team and had a record of 16–4 entering the September 12, 1993, game against the San Diego Padres. Avery lost and suffered an injury to a muscle under his pitching armpit. Many blame Avery's injury on his heavy workload as a young pitcher; he had started 135 major league games before reaching the age of 24. Avery was never again the same pitcher, although he ended the year 18–6 with a 2.94 ERA.

Avery was outpitched early in Game One of the 1993 NLCS by Curt Schilling of the Philadelphia Phillies. A late rally tied the game and got Avery off the hook, but the Braves still lost. In his second matchup with Schilling, the Braves again got Avery off the hook for the loss, but again ultimately lost the game in extra innings, 4–3.

Avery's career went rapidly downhill after his injury. His record after September 12, 1993, was 44–50 after compiling a 47–22 record from the beginning of 1991 until the injury. However, Avery showed occasional flashes of his previous brilliance. After struggling throughout 1995, Avery started Game Four of the 1995 NLCS with the Braves up three games to none over the Reds. He pitched an outstanding game and won, 6–0, sending Atlanta into the World Series. In Game Four of the 1995 World Series, he was the surprise starter over ace Greg Maddux, and he was also the winner, 5–2, pitching six innings and giving up one run against the Cleveland Indians. That was his only victory in a World Series and eventually Atlanta won the title that year in six games. His lifetime record in World Series is 1-3 with a 3.41 ERA.

Avery missed two months with injury in 1996 and finished with a 7–10 record. His only appearance in the 1996 World Series was in the top of the 10th inning of Game Four, a game that saw the Braves blow a 6–0 lead to the New York Yankees en route to an 8–6 loss in the game. Pitching 2/3 innings, Avery earned the loss, giving up a hit, a run, and three walks, the last of which (to Wade Boggs) forced in the go-ahead run. Atlanta manager Bobby Cox earned some criticism at the time owing to his decision to have Avery intentionally walk Bernie Williams to load the bases for Boggs.

=== Boston, Cincinnati and Detroit ===
With his career in a sudden and premature decline, Avery was granted free agency and signed with the Boston Red Sox on January 22, 1997. He pitched two years for the Red Sox, going 16–14 over two seasons as the number two starter behind Pedro Martínez.

He signed a one-year contract with the Reds for the 1999 season. He was 6–7 when he was lost for the rest of the year in July to a torn labrum. He signed with the Braves during spring training in 2000 and again during spring training in 2001, but failed to make the club each time.

In 2003, Avery made a brief comeback with the Detroit Tigers team that threatened to break the 120-loss record of the 1962 New York Mets. He made 19 relief appearances, including the final appearance of his career on July 20, 2003, at U.S. Cellular Field against the Chicago White Sox. His final pitch was a double play caused when Paul Konerko lined to Avery and he threw Magglio Ordóñez out before he was able to get back to first base.

Avery was 2-0 and batted 1.000 as a Tiger.

In an eleven-season career, Avery posted a 96–83 record with 980 strikeouts and a 4.19 ERA in 1554 2/3 innings pitched.

== Sources ==
- The ESPN Baseball Encyclopedia – Gary Gillette, Peter Gammons, Pete Palmer. Publisher: Sterling Publishing, 2005. Format: Paperback, 1824pp. Language: English. ISBN 1-4027-4771-3
