= 1993 Pittsburgh Pirates season =

1993 Pittsburgh Pirates
- League: National League
- Division: East
- Ballpark: Three Rivers Stadium
- City: Pittsburgh, Pennsylvania
- Record: 75–87 (.463)
- Divisional place: 5th
- Owners: Pittsburgh Associates
- General managers: Ted Simmons; Cam Bonifay
- Managers: Jim Leyland
- Television: KDKA-TV; KBL
- Radio: KDKA-AM (Steve Blass, Kent Derdivanis, Lanny Frattare, Jim Rooker)

The 1993 Pittsburgh Pirates season was the 112th in franchise history; the 107th in the National League. This was their 24th season at Three Rivers Stadium. This season saw the three-time defending National League East champions fall to fifth place in the division with a 75–87 record. In the offseason, the National League expanded to 14 teams and Barry Bonds left the Pirates and signed with the San Francisco Giants. This season was the first of the Pirates' record-setting twenty straight losing seasons.

== Offseason ==
- November 17, 1992: Alex Cole was drafted from the Pirates by the Colorado Rockies as the 17th pick in the 1992 MLB expansion draft.
- November 19, 1992: Roger Mason was released by the Pittsburgh Pirates.
- November 25, 1992: Gary Varsho was selected off waivers from the Pirates by the Cincinnati Reds.
- December 7, 1992: Dave Otto was drafted by the Pirates from the Cleveland Indians in the 1992 minor league draft.
- December 16, 1992: John Candelaria was signed as a free agent by the Pirates.
- January 27, 1993: Elmer Dessens was signed as an amateur free agent by the Pirates.

== Regular season ==
=== Season standings ===
NL East
Team	W	L	Pct.	GB	Home	Road
Philadelphia Phillies	97	65	.599	—	52‍–‍29	45‍–‍36
Montreal Expos	94	68	.580	3	55‍–‍26	39‍–‍42
St. Louis Cardinals	87	75	.537	10	49‍–‍32	38‍–‍43
Chicago Cubs	84	78	.519	13	43‍–‍38	41‍–‍40
Pittsburgh Pirates	75	87	.463	22	40‍–‍41	35‍–‍46
Florida Marlins	64	98	.395	33	35‍–‍46	29‍–‍52
New York Mets	59	103	.364	38	28‍–‍53	31‍–‍50

=== Game log ===
1993 Game Log: 75–87 (Home: 40–41; Away: 35–46)
April: 11–11 (Home: 5–6; Away: 6–5)

#	Date	Opponent	Score	Win	Loss	Save	Attendance	Record
1	April 6	Padres	9–4	**Wakefield** (1–0)	Benes	**Candelaria** (1)	44,103	1–0
2	April 8	Padres	5–4	**Walk** (1–0)	Harris	**Belinda** (1)	15,828	2–0
3	April 9	Giants	6–5	**Minor** (1–0)	Beck	**Belinda** (2)	22,718	3–0
4	April 10	Giants	5–12	Burba	**Cooke** (0–1)	—	18,264	3–1
5	April 11	Giants	3–4	Burkett	**Wakefield** (1–1)	Beck	12,844	3–2
6	April 12	@ Padres	4–2	**Otto** (1–0)	Harris	**Belinda** (3)	46,192	4–2
7	April 13	@ Padres	6–4	**Walk** (2–0)	Gomez	**Wagner** (1)	11,493	5–2
8	April 14	@ Padres	11–7	**Minor** (2–0)	Seminara	—	13,053	6–2
9	April 15	@ Padres	5–4 (13)	**Moeller** (1–0)	Hernandez	**Belinda** (4)	15,821	7–2
10	April 16	@ Dodgers	4–7	Hershiser	**Wakefield** (1–2)	Gott	39,652	7–3
11	April 17	@ Dodgers	3–6	Martinez	**Otto** (1–1)	—	46,034	7–4
12	April 18	@ Dodgers	4–6	Gross	**Walk** (2–1)	Wilson	37,949	7–5
13	April 20	Reds	0–5	Belcher	**Tomlin** (0–1)	—	9,074	7–6
14	April 21	Reds	7–8 (12)	Foster	**Candelaria** (0–1)	—	16,796	7–7
15	April 22	Reds	5–4	**Wakefield** (2–2)	Smiley	—	10,500	8–7
16	April 23	Astros	2–4	Swindell	**Neagle** (0–1)	Jones	13,487	8–8
17	April 24	Astros	4–8	Hernandez	**Candelaria** (0–2)	—	19,498	8–9
18	April 25	Astros	7–2	**Tomlin** (1–1)	Portugal	—	15,102	9–9
19	April 26	@ Braves	4–3 (11)	**Minor** (3–0)	McMichael	**Belinda** (5)	47,324	10–9
20	April 27	@ Braves	6–2 (11)	**Wakefield** (3–2)	Stanton	**Wagner** (2)	42,527	11–9
21	April 28	@ Reds	2–4	Pugh	**Otto** (1–2)	Reardon	23,603	11–10
22	April 30	@ Astros	2–11	Portugal	**Walk** (2–2)	Hernandez	31,867	11–11

May: 12–14 (Home: 7–7; Away: 5–7)

#	Date	Opponent	Score	Win	Loss	Save	Attendance	Record
23	May 1	@ Astros	3–7	Drabek	**Tomlin** (1–2)	—	39,242	11–12
24	May 2	@ Astros	6–2	**Cooke** (1–1)	Swindell	—	24,485	12–12
25	May 4	Braves	2–3	Glavine	**Wakefield** (3–3)	Stanton	11,516	12–13
26	May 5	Braves	4–1	**Walk** (3–2)	Maddux	**Belinda** (6)	16,034	13–13
27	May 7	Expos	0–1	Nabholz	**Tomlin** (1–3)	Wetteland	30,984	13–14
28	May 8	Expos	10–9 (10)	**Belinda** (1–0)	Bottenfield	—	33,739	14–14
29	May 9	Expos	6–5 (11)	**Minor** (4–0)	Barnes	—	17,714	15–14
30	May 10	@ Phillies	1–5	Jackson	**Walk** (3–3)	—	29,712	15–15
31	May 11	@ Phillies	8–4	**Wagner** (1–0)	Davis	—	32,871	16–15
32	May 12	@ Phillies	1–4	Greene	**Tomlin** (1–4)	—	24,906	16–16
33	May 14	@ Cubs	2–3	Harkey	**Cooke** (1–2)	Myers	27,637	16–17
34	May 15	@ Cubs	5–14	Guzman	**Wakefield** (3–4)	—	39,706	16–18
35	May 16	@ Cubs	5–3	**Walk** (4–3)	Hibbard	**Belinda** (7)	38,623	17–18
36	May 17	@ Mets	9–4	**Tomlin** (2–4)	Gooden	—	18,724	18–18
37	May 18	@ Mets	10–8	**Otto** (2–2)	Schourek	**Belinda** (8)	18,973	19–18
38	May 19	@ Mets	4–6 (10)	Franco	**Minor** (4–1)	—	19,112	19–19
39	May 21	Cardinals	8–10 (11)	Lancaster	**Wagner** (1–1)	Perez	22,800	19–20
40	May 22	Cardinals	4–2	**Walk** (5–3)	Osborne	**Belinda** (9)	26,012	20–20
41	May 23	Cardinals	3–4 (10)	Smith	**Minor** (4–2)	Perez	35,249	20–21
42	May 25	Marlins	2–0	**Cooke** (2–2)	Hough	—	14,595	21–21
43	May 26	Marlins	4–5	Hammond	**Wagner** (1–2)	Harvey	23,267	21–22
44	May 27	Marlins	13–8	**Walk** (6–3)	Bowen	—	17,245	22–22
45	May 28	Dodgers	2–7	Astacio	**Tomlin** (2–5)	—	18,532	22–23
46	May 29	Dodgers	1–6	Martinez	**Otto** (2–3)	—	27,664	22–24
47	May 30	Dodgers	5–3	**Cooke** (3–2)	Gross	**Belinda** (10)	28,569	23–24
48	May 31	@ Rockies	2–6	Reynoso	**Wakefield** (3–5)	—	47,665	23–25

June: 14–14 (Home: 9–3; Away: 5–11)

#	Date	Opponent	Score	Win	Loss	Save	Attendance	Record
49	June 1	@ Rockies	8–6	**Walk** (7–3)	Smith	—	45,752	24–25
50	June 2	@ Rockies	5–3	**Petkovsek** (1–0)	Parrett	**Belinda** (11)	50,122	25–25
51	June 3	@ Giants	2–1	**Neagle** (1–1)	Brummett	**Minor** (1)	15,804	26–25
52	June 4	@ Giants	3–2	**Cooke** (4–2)	Brantley	**Belinda** (12)	15,725	27–25
53	June 5	@ Giants	2–3	Wilson	**Wakefield** (3–6)	Beck	23,990	27–26
54	June 6	@ Giants	1–7	Swift	**Walk** (7–4)	—	40,594	27–27
55	June 8	Rockies	1–4	Ruffin	**Wagner** (1–3)	Shepherd	16,722	27–28
56	June 9	Rockies	4–1	**Neagle** (2–1)	Blair	**Belinda** (13)	30,625	28–28
57	June 10	@ Marlins	3–4	Turner	**Otto** (2–4)	Harvey	34,091	28–29
58	June 11	@ Marlins	3–11	Aquino	**Wakefield** (3–7)	—	42,835	28–30
59	June 12	@ Marlins	2–5	Hammond	**Walk** (7–5)	Harvey	43,294	28–31
60	June 13	@ Marlins	2–5	Bowen	**Minor** (4–3)	Harvey	42,945	28–32
61	June 14	@ Cardinals	3–8	Osborne	**Neagle** (2–2)	Perez	26,683	28–33
62	June 15	@ Cardinals	3–6	Tewksbury	**Cooke** (4–3)	Smith	36,084	28–34
63	June 16	@ Cardinals	2–3	Magrane	**Smith** (0–1)	Smith	36,746	28–35
64	June 17	Mets	6–2	**Walk** (8–5)	Gooden	—	20,324	29–35
65	June 18	Mets	5–2	**Wagner** (2–3)	Young	—	21,521	30–35
66	June 19	Mets	8–3	**Toliver** (1–0)	Tanana	**Minor** (2)	24,199	31–35
67	June 20	Mets	3–2	**Belinda** (2–0)	Saberhagen	—	14,180	32–35
68	June 21	Cubs	1–5	Bautista	**Smith** (0–2)	—	18,476	32–36
69	June 22	Cubs	7–2	**Walk** (9–5)	Wendell	—	22,773	33–36
70	June 23	Cubs	9–4	**Wagner** (3–3)	Boskie	**Belinda** (14)	16,423	34–36
71	June 25	Phillies	6–8	DeLeon	**Candelaria** (0–3)	Williams	21,173	34–37
72	June 26	Phillies	4–2	**Cooke** (5–3)	Schilling	—	39,439	35–37
73	June 27	Phillies	4–3 (10)	**Belinda** (3–0)	Williams	—	27,824	36–37
74	June 28	@ Expos	9–5 (10)	**Wakefield** (4–7)	Scott	—	17,185	37–37
75	June 29	@ Expos	2–9	Nabholz	**Wagner** (3–4)	—	14,023	37–38
76	June 30	@ Expos	1–9	Gardiner	**Neagle** (2–3)	Fassero	15,734	37–39

July: 10–18 (Home: 5–8; Away: 5–10)

#	Date	Opponent	Score	Win	Loss	Save	Attendance	Record
77	July 1	@ Expos	5–7	Rojas	**Cooke** (5–4)	Wetteland	13,174	37–40
78	July 2	@ Reds	10–9	**Otto** (3–4)	Ayala	**Belinda** (15)	—	38–40
79	July 2	@ Reds	1–9	Pugh	**Wakefield** (4–8)	—	32,681	38–41
80	July 3	@ Reds	3–5	Luebbers	**Walk** (9–6)	Dibble	34,771	38–42
81	July 4	@ Reds	2–7	Browning	**Wagner** (3–5)	Spradlin	28,046	38–43
82	July 5	@ Reds	4–6	Belcher	**Neagle** (2–4)	Dibble	27,851	38–44
83	July 6	@ Astros	10–3	**Ballard** (1–0)	Harnisch	—	17,582	39–44
84	July 7	@ Astros	5–2	**Wagner** (4–5)	Portugal	**Belinda** (16)	24,682	40–44
85	July 8	@ Astros	4–10	Kile	**Smith** (0–3)	—	19,999	40–45
86	July 9	Reds	4–1	**Walk** (10–6)	Browning	**Belinda** (17)	21,016	41–45
87	July 10	Reds	7–10	Service	**Wagner** (4–6)	Dibble	30,805	41–46
88	July 11	Reds	3–2	**Minor** (5–3)	Reardon	—	22,772	42–46
89	July 15	@ Braves	0–4	Glavine	**Tomlin** (2–6)	—	49,046	42–47
90	July 16	@ Braves	2–3	Maddux	**Cooke** (5–5)	Stanton	48,539	42–48
91	July 17	@ Braves	4–3	**Wagner** (5–6)	Smoltz	**Belinda** (18)	48,665	43–48
92	July 18	@ Braves	0–2	Avery	**Smith** (0–4)	Stanton	49,003	43–49
93	July 19	Astros	2–4	Harnisch	**Walk** (10–7)	Jones	14,068	43–50
94	July 20	Astros	2–1	**Tomlin** (3–6)	Drabek	—	18,008	44–50
95	July 21	Astros	3–5	Kile	**Cooke** (5–6)	Jones	28,227	44–51
96	July 22	Braves	8–7	**Minor** (6–3)	Howell	—	19,108	45–51
97	July 23	Braves	2–6	Avery	**Belinda** (3–1)	—	37,506	45–52
98	July 24	Braves	6–11	Bedrosian	**Walk** (10–8)	—	33,347	45–53
99	July 25	Braves	1–13	Glavine	**Tomlin** (3–7)	—	29,386	45–54
100	July 27	Expos	6–8	Scott	**Johnston** (0–1)	Wetteland	14,128	45–55
101	July 28	Expos	3–2	**Petkovsek** (2–0)	Shaw	—	13,470	46–55
102	July 29	Expos	2–3 (11)	Wetteland	**Minor** (6–4)	Heredia	18,823	46–56
103	July 30	@ Phillies	4–2	**Walk** (11–8)	Rivera	**Belinda** (19)	47,406	47–56
104	July 31	@ Phillies	2–10	Jackson	**Tomlin** (3–8)	—	48,171	47–57

August: 15–13 (Home: 7–8; Away: 8–5)

#	Date	Opponent	Score	Win	Loss	Save	Attendance	Record
105	August 1	@ Phillies	4–5	Mason	**Cooke** (5–7)	Williams	46,693	47–58
106	August 2	@ Cubs	10–12	Scanlan	**Minor** (6–5)	Myers	31,402	47–59
107	August 3	@ Cubs	7–3	**Smith** (1–4)	Hibbard	—	25,698	48–59
108	August 4	@ Cubs	6–5	**Ballard** (2–0)	Boskie	**Neagle** (1)	33,775	49–59
109	August 5	@ Cubs	5–2	**Tomlin** (4–8)	Morgan	**Dewey** (1)	31,639	50–59
110	August 7	@ Mets	2–1	**Cooke** (6–7)	Gooden	**Dewey** (2)	—	51–59
111	August 7	@ Mets	8–10	Maddux	**Neagle** (2–5)	Young	27,904	51–60
112	August 8	@ Mets	3–2	**Smith** (2–4)	Tanana	—	27,231	52–60
113	August 9	Cardinals	3–7	Watson	**Walk** (11–9)	—	16,465	52–61
114	August 10	Cardinals	2–4	Arocha	**Johnston** (0–2)	Smith	12,531	52–62
115	August 11	Cardinals	8–6	**Dewey** (1–0)	Burns	—	35,288	53–62
116	August 12	Cardinals	5–4 (11)	**Johnston** (1–2)	Burns	—	12,730	54–62
117	August 13	Marlins	8–3	**Smith** (3–4)	Hough	—	27,767	55–62
118	August 14	Marlins	3–8	Bowen	**Walk** (11–10)	Harvey	29,003	55–63
119	August 15	Marlins	4–3 (11)	**Minor** (7–5)	Aquino	—	22,665	56–63
120	August 17	Giants	10–3	**Cooke** (7–7)	Burkett	—	29,222	57–63
121	August 18	Giants	6–9	Wilson	**Smith** (3–5)	—	23,314	57–64
122	August 19	Giants	3–6	Hickerson	**Walk** (11–11)	Beck	20,151	57–65
123	August 20	@ Padres	7–6	**Petkovsek** (3–0)	Davis	**Dewey** (3)	17,888	58–65
124	August 22	@ Padres	10–5	**Cooke** (8–7)	Benes	—	10,492	59–65
125	August 23	@ Dodgers	1–6	Hershiser	**Smith** (3–6)	—	38,739	59–66
126	August 24	@ Dodgers	4–13	Gross	**Walk** (11–12)	—	36,133	59–67
127	August 25	@ Dodgers	2–1 (12)	**Neagle** (3–5)	Gott	—	33,914	60–67
128	August 27	Padres	6–10	Benes	**Cooke** (8–8)	Hoffman	21,048	60–68
129	August 28	Padres	3–5	Sanders	**Smith** (3–7)	Harris	28,972	60–69
130	August 29	Padres	7–4	**Walk** (12–12)	Ashby	**Dewey** (4)	—	61–69
131	August 29	Padres	0–11	Brocail	**Hope** (0–1)	—	21,636	61–70
132	August 31	Dodgers	6–2	**Johnston** (2–2)	Gross	—	16,291	62–70

September: 12–15 (Home: 7–9; Away: 5–6)

#	Date	Opponent	Score	Win	Loss	Save	Attendance	Record
133	September 1	Dodgers	5–1	**Cooke** (9–8)	Candiotti	—	20,778	63–70
134	September 2	Dodgers	0–4	Astacio	**Ballard** (2–1)	—	14,165	63–71
135	September 3	@ Rockies	6–7	Holmes	**Dewey** (1–1)	—	51,512	63–72
136	September 4	@ Rockies	4–10	Painter	**Wakefield** (4–9)	—	56,113	63–73
137	September 5	@ Rockies	1–4	Ruffin	**Walk** (12–13)	Holmes	54,034	63–74
138	September 6	@ Giants	1–4	Sanderson	**Wagner** (5–7)	Beck	25,276	63–75
139	September 7	@ Giants	4–3	**Menendez** (1–0)	Jackson	**Dewey** (5)	17,314	64–75
140	September 9	Rockies	7–10 (12)	Wayne	**Johnston** (2–3)	—	10,016	64–76
141	September 10	Rockies	8–9 (11)	Moore	**Minor** (7–6)	Holmes	15,335	64–77
142	September 11	Rockies	2–3	Bottenfield	**Wakefield** (4–10)	Ruffin	21,649	64–78
143	September 12	Rockies	4–3	**Menendez** (2–0)	Munoz	—	21,032	65–78
144	September 14	@ Marlins	1–0 (6)	**Wagner** (6–7)	Hammond	—	28,497	66–78
145	September 15	@ Marlins	8–1	**Cooke** (10–8)	Hough	—	28,788	67–78
146	September 16	@ Marlins	10–0	**Ballard** (3–1)	Weathers	—	26,730	68–78
147	September 17	@ Cardinals	2–1	**Minor** (8–6)	Urbani	**Dewey** (6)	28,625	69–78
148	September 18	@ Cardinals	1–8	Cormier	**Wakefield** (4–11)	—	32,268	69–79
149	September 19	@ Cardinals	6–7	Perez	**Dewey** (1–2)	—	31,631	69–80
150	September 20	Mets	6–2	**Wagner** (7–7)	Hillman	**Johnston** (1)	9,069	70–80
151	September 21	Mets	3–4	Telgheder	**Cooke** (10–9)	Maddux	9,263	70–81
152	September 22	Mets	5–6 (10)	Franco	**Johnston** (2–4)	—	10,031	70–82
153	September 24	Cubs	3–8	Hibbard	**Walk** (12–14)	Bullinger	16,312	70–83
154	September 26	Cubs	5–1	**Wagner** (8–7)	Trachsel	—	—	71–83
155	September 26	Cubs	1–0	**Wakefield** (5–11)	Morgan	—	26,872	72–83
156	September 27	Phillies	4–6	Rivera	**Cooke** (10–10)	Williams	15,847	72–84
157	September 28	Phillies	7–10	Thigpen	**Robertson** (0–1)	—	17,386	72–85
158	September 29	Phillies	9–1	**Walk** (13–14)	Foster	**Johnston** (2)	21,159	73–85
159	September 30	Phillies	5–0	**Wakefield** (6–11)	Greene	—	10,448	74–85

October: 1–2 (Home: 0–0; Away: 1–2)

#	Date	Opponent	Score	Win	Loss	Save	Attendance	Record
160	October 1	@ Expos	3–6	Heredia	**Wagner** (8–8)	Wetteland	14,148	74–86
161	October 2	@ Expos	4–2	**Ballard** (4–1)	Henry	**Dewey** (7)	16,126	75–86
162	October 3	@ Expos	1–3	Boucher	**Hope** (0–2)	Wetteland	26,277	75–87

Legend: = Win = Loss
Bold = Pirates team member

=== Record vs. opponents ===
1993 National League record Source: MLB Standings Grid – 1993
Team	ATL	CHC	CIN	COL	FLA	HOU	LAD	MON	NYM	PHI	PIT	SD	SF	STL
Atlanta	—	7–5	10–3	13–0	7–5	8–5	8–5	7–5	9–3	6–6	7–5	9–4	7–6	6–6
Chicago	5–7	—	7–5	8–4	6–7	4–8	7–5	5–8–1	8–5	7–6	5–8	8–4	6–6	8–5
Cincinnati	3–10	5–7	—	9–4	7–5	6–7	5–8	4–8	6–6	4–8	8–4	9–4	2–11	5–7
Colorado	0–13	4–8	4–9	—	7–5	11–2	7–6	3–9	6–6	3–9	8–4	6–7	3–10	5–7
Florida	5–7	7–6	5–7	5–7	—	3–9	5–7	5–8	4–9	4–9	6–7	7–5	4–8	4–9
Houston	5–8	8–4	7–6	2–11	9–3	—	9–4	5–7	11–1	5–7	7–5	8–5	3–10	6–6
Los Angeles	5–8	5–7	8–5	6–7	7–5	4–9	—	6–6	8–4	2–10	8–4	9–4	7–6	6–6
Montreal	5–7	8–5–1	8–4	9–3	8–5	7–5	6–6	—	9–4	6–7	8–5	10–2	3–9	7–6
New York	3–9	5–8	6–6	6–6	9–4	1–11	4–8	4–9	—	3–10	4–9	5–7	4–8	5–8
Philadelphia	6-6	6–7	8–4	9–3	9–4	7–5	10–2	7–6	10–3	—	7–6	6–6	4–8	8–5
Pittsburgh	5–7	8–5	4–8	4–8	7–6	5–7	4–8	5–8	9–4	6–7	—	9–3	5–7	4–9
San Diego	4–9	4–8	4–9	7–6	5–7	5–8	4–9	2–10	7–5	6–6	3–9	—	3–10	7–5
San Francisco	6–7	6–6	11–2	10–3	8–4	10–3	6–7	9–3	8–4	8–4	7–5	10–3	—	4–8
St. Louis	6–6	5–8	7–5	7–5	9–4	6–6	6–6	6–7	8–5	5–8	9–4	5–7	8–4	—

=== Detailed records ===
National League
Opponent	W	L	WP	RS	RA
NL East
Chicago Cubs	8	5	0.615	66	62
Florida Marlins	7	6	0.538	63	53
Montreal Expos	5	8	0.385	52	69
New York Mets	9	4	0.692	72	52
Philadelphia Phillies	6	7	0.462	59	60
**Pittsburgh Pirates**					
St. Louis Cardinals	4	9	0.308	50	70
Total	39	39	0.500	362	366
NL West
Atlanta Braves	5	7	0.417	39	58
Cincinnati Reds	4	8	0.333	48	70
Colorado Rockies	4	8	0.333	52	66
Houston Astros	5	7	0.417	50	59
Los Angeles Dodgers	4	8	0.333	37	62
San Diego Padres	9	3	0.750	73	66
San Francisco Giants	5	7	0.417	46	59
Total	36	48	0.429	345	440
Season Total	75	87	0.463	707	806

Month	Games	Won	Lost	Win %	RS	RA
April	22	11	11	0.500	104	116
May	26	12	14	0.462	120	130
June	28	14	14	0.500	109	125
July	28	10	18	0.357	105	155
August	28	15	13	0.536	143	156
September	27	12	15	0.444	118	113
October	3	1	2	0.333	8	11
Total	162	75	87	0.463	707	806

	Games	Won	Lost	Win %	RS	RA
Home	81	40	41	0.494	372	388
Away	81	35	46	0.432	335	418
Total	162	75	87	0.463	707	806

== Roster ==
1993 Pittsburgh Pirates
Roster
Pitchers: 66 Jeff Ballard; 50 Stan Belinda; 45 John Candelaria; 26 Steve Cooke; 50 Mark Dewey; 56 John Hope; 64 Joel Johnston; 67 Tony Menéndez; 32 Dan Miceli; 53 Paul Miller; 55,66 Blas Minor; 24 Dennis Moeller; 15,32 Denny Neagle; 48 Dave Otto; 65 Mark Petkovsek; 58 Rich Robertson; 42 Brian Shouse; 41 Zane Smith; 61 Freddie Toliver; 29 Randy Tomlin; 43 Paul Wagner; 49 Tim Wakefield; 17 Bob Walk	Catchers: 57 Jerry Goff; 12 Mike LaValliere; 14 Tom Prince; 11 Don Slaught; Infielders: 48 Rich Aude; 3 Jay Bell; 16 Tom Foley; 13 Carlos García; 7 Jeff King; 51 Tony Womack; 36 Kevin Young	Outfielders: 47 Scott Bullett; 35 Dave Clark; 30 Midre Cummings; 28 Al Martin; 23 Lloyd McClendon; 6 Orlando Merced; 25 Will Pennyfeather; 44,66 Ben Shelton; 27 Lonnie Smith; 59 Andy Tomberlin; 18 Andy Van Slyke; 22 John Wehner; 53 Glenn Wilson	Manager: 10 Jim Leyland; Coaches: 44 Terry Collins (bullpen); 45 Rich Donnelly (third base); 39 Milt May (hitting); 31 Ray Miller (pitching); 37 Tommy Sandt (first base); 19 Bill Virdon (bench)

=== Opening Day lineup ===
Opening Day Starters
#	Name	Position
28	Al Martin	LF
3	Jay Bell	SS
18	Andy Van Slyke	CF
7	Jeff King	3B
6	Orlando Merced	RF
36	Kevin Young	1B
12	Mike LaValliere	C
13	Carlos García	2B
49	Tim Wakefield	SP

== Player stats ==
Batting

Note: G = Games played; AB = At bats; H = Hits; Avg. = Batting average; HR = Home runs; RBI = Runs batted in

Regular season
Player	G	AB	H	Avg.	HR	RBI
J. Ballard	25	11	4	0.364	0	0
J. Johnston	33	6	2	0.333	0	0
O. Merced	137	447	140	0.313	8	70
J. Bell	154	604	187	0.310	9	51
A. Van Slyke	83	323	100	0.310	8	50
D. Slaught	116	377	113	0.300	10	55
J. Goff	14	37	11	0.297	2	6
J. King	158	611	180	0.295	9	98
Z. Smith	94	199	57	0.286	6	24
A. Tomberlin	27	42	12	0.286	1	5
A. Martin	143	480	135	0.281	18	64
D. Clark	110	277	75	0.271	11	46
C. García	141	546	147	0.269	12	47
T. Foley	86	194	49	0.253	3	22
B. Shelton	15	24	6	0.250	2	7
K. Young	141	449	106	0.236	6	47
D. Otto	28	18	4	0.222	0	4
L. McClendon	88	181	40	0.221	2	19
W. Pennyfeather	21	34	7	0.206	0	2
S. Bullett	23	55	11	0.200	0	4
M. LaValliere	1	5	1	0.200	0	0
B. Minor	65	10	2	0.200	0	0
T. Prince	66	179	35	0.196	2	24
P. Wagner	44	42	8	0.190	0	1
R. Tomlin	18	33	6	0.182	0	1
T. Wakefield	24	43	7	0.163	1	3
S. Cooke	32	71	11	0.155	0	5
J. Wehner	29	35	5	0.143	0	0
G. Wilson	10	14	2	0.143	0	0
B. Walk	32	58	7	0.121	0	2
R. Aude	13	26	3	0.115	0	4
M. Cummings	13	36	4	0.111	0	3
T. Womack	15	24	2	0.083	0	0
L. Smith	14	25	2	0.080	0	0
J. Hope	7	13	1	0.077	0	0
S. Belinda	40	1	0	0.000	0	0
T. Menéndez	14	1	0	0.000	0	0
P. Miller	3	2	0	0.000	0	0
D. Neagle	50	14	0	0.000	0	0
F. Toliver	12	2	0	0.000	0	0
J. Candelaria	24	0	0	—	0	0
M. Dewey	21	0	0	—	0	0
D. Miceli	9	0	0	—	0	0
D. Moeller	10	0	0	—	0	0
M. Petkovsek	26	0	0	—	0	0
R. Robertson	9	0	0	—	0	0
B. Shouse	6	0	0	—	0	0
Team totals	162	5,549	1,482	0.267	110	664

Pitching

Note: G = Games pitched; IP = Innings pitched; W = Wins; L = Losses; ERA = Earned run average; SO = Strikeouts

Regular season
Player	G	IP	W	L	ERA	SO
M. Dewey	21	26 2/3	1	2	2.36	14
T. Menéndez	14	21	2	0	3.00	13
J. Johnston	33	53 1/3	2	4	3.38	31
S. Belinda	40	42 1/3	3	1	3.61	30
F. Toliver	12	21 2/3	1	0	3.74	14
S. Cooke	32	210 2/3	10	10	3.89	132
J. Hope	7	38	0	2	4.03	8
B. Minor	65	94 1/3	8	6	4.10	84
P. Wagner	44	141 1/3	8	8	4.27	114
L. Smith	14	83	3	7	4.55	32
R. Tomlin	18	98 1/3	4	8	4.85	44
J. Ballard	25	53 2/3	4	1	4.86	16
D. Otto	28	68	3	4	5.03	30
D. Miceli	9	5 1/3	0	0	5.06	4
D. Neagle	50	81 1/3	3	5	5.31	73
P. Miller	3	10	0	0	5.40	2
T. Wakefield	24	128 1/3	6	11	5.61	59
B. Walk	32	187	13	14	5.68	80
R. Robertson	9	9	0	1	6.00	5
M. Petkovsek	26	32 1/3	3	0	6.96	14
J. Candelaria	24	19 2/3	0	3	8.24	17
B. Shouse	6	4	0	0	9.00	3
D. Moeller	10	16 1/3	1	0	9.92	13
Team totals	162	1,445 2/3	75	87	4.77	832

== Awards and honors ==
1993 Major League Baseball All-Star Game

- Jay Bell, SS, reserve
- Andy Van Slyke, CF, reserve

== Notable transactions ==
- April 11, 1993: Mike LaValliere was released by the Pirates.
- July 9, 1993: John Candelaria was released by the Pirates.
- July 31, 1993: Stan Belinda was traded by the Pirates to the Kansas City Royals for Jon Lieber and Dan Miceli.
- August 19, 1993: Dave Otto was released by the Pirates.

== Farm system ==
Level	Team	League	Manager
AAA	Buffalo Bisons	American Association	Doc Edwards
AA	Carolina Mudcats	Southern League	Spin Williams and John Wockenfuss
A	Salem Buccaneers	Carolina League	Scott Little
A	Augusta Pirates	South Atlantic League	Trent Jewett
A-Short Season	Welland Pirates	New York–Penn League	Larry Smith
Rookie	GCL Pirates	Gulf Coast League	Woody Huyke
