= 1994 Pittsburgh Pirates season =

1994 Pittsburgh Pirates
- League: National League
- Division: Central
- Ballpark: Three Rivers Stadium
- City: Pittsburgh, Pennsylvania
- Record: 53–61 (.465)
- Divisional place: 3rd
- Owners: Pittsburgh Associates
- General managers: Cam Bonifay
- Managers: Jim Leyland
- Television: KDKA-TV; KBL
- Radio: KDKA-AM (Steve Blass, Greg Brown, Lanny Frattare, Bob Walk)

The 1994 Pittsburgh Pirates season was their 113th season; the 108th in the National League. This was their 25th season at Three Rivers Stadium. The Pirates finished the shortened season third in the National League Central with a record of 53–61. They hosted the 1994 Major League Baseball All-Star Game in the 125th Anniversary season of Major League Baseball.

== Offseason ==
- January 5, 1994: John DeSalvo 1st round draftee out of Ocean City, NJ signed with the Pittsburgh Pirates.
- March 28, 1994: Gary Varsho was released by the Pittsburgh Pirates.
- March 29, 1994: Gary Varsho was signed as a free agent with the Pittsburgh Pirates.

== Regular season ==
The Pirates had scored 466 runs (4.09 per game) and allowed 580 runs (5.09 per game) with a 53-61 record by Friday, August 12, 1994, when the MLB Players' strike began. Pittsburgh struggled offensively during the season, finishing 28th in runs scored (466), runs batted in (435), home runs (80, tied with the Philadelphia Phillies), total bases (1,485) and slugging percentage (.384). They were shut out 11 times in 114 games, the most in the Majors. One highlight of the season was their 4-0 shutout of the best team in baseball, the Montreal Expos, at Three Rivers Stadium on Thursday, August 11, just one day prior to the strike. Zane Smith picked up the win for the Pirates.

=== Season standings ===
NL Central
| Team | W | L | Pct. | GB | Home | Road |
|---|---|---|---|---|---|---|
| Cincinnati Reds | 66 | 48 | .579 | — | 37‍–‍22 | 29‍–‍26 |
| Houston Astros | 66 | 49 | .574 | ½ | 37‍–‍22 | 29‍–‍27 |
| Pittsburgh Pirates | 53 | 61 | .465 | 13 | 32‍–‍29 | 21‍–‍32 |
| St. Louis Cardinals | 53 | 61 | .465 | 13 | 23‍–‍33 | 30‍–‍28 |
| Chicago Cubs | 49 | 64 | .434 | 16½ | 20‍–‍39 | 29‍–‍25 |

Division leaders
| Team | W | L | Pct. |
|---|---|---|---|
| Montreal Expos | 74 | 40 | .649 |
| Cincinnati Reds | 66 | 48 | .579 |
| Los Angeles Dodgers | 58 | 56 | .509 |

| Wild Card team | W | L | Pct. | GB |
|---|---|---|---|---|
| Atlanta Braves | 68 | 46 | 0.597 | — |
| Houston Astros | 66 | 49 | 0.574 | 2 1/2 |
| New York Mets | 55 | 58 | 0.487 | 12 1/2 |
| San Francisco Giants | 55 | 60 | 0.478 | 13 1/2 |
| Philadelphia Phillies | 54 | 61 | 0.470 | 14 1/2 |
| St. Louis Cardinals | 53 | 61 | 0.465 | 15 |
| Pittsburgh Pirates | 53 | 61 | 0.465 | 15 |
| Colorado Rockies | 53 | 64 | 0.453 | 16 1/2 |
| Florida Marlins | 51 | 64 | 0.444 | 17 1/2 |
| Chicago Cubs | 49 | 64 | 0.434 | 18 1/2 |
| San Diego Padres | 47 | 70 | 0.402 | 22 1/2 |

=== Game log ===
1994 Game Log: 53–61 (Home: 32–29; Away: 21–32)
April: 12–10 (Home: 9–3; Away: 3–7)

| # | Date | Opponent | Score | Win | Loss | Save | Attendance | Record |
|---|---|---|---|---|---|---|---|---|
| 1 | April 4 | @ Giants | 0–8 | Burkett | **Smith** (0–1) | — | 58,077 | 0–1 |
| 2 | April 5 | @ Giants | 0–2 | Swift | **Cooke** (0–1) | Beck | 20,674 | 0–2 |
| 3 | April 6 | @ Giants | 2–4 | Portugal | **Neagle** (0–1) | — | 19,567 | 0–3 |
| 4 | April 8 | Rockies | 3–7 | Nied | **Wagner** (0–1) | — | 44,136 | 0–4 |
| 5 | April 9 | Rockies | 10–5 | **Smith** (1–1) | Reynoso | — | 17,458 | 1–4 |
| 6 | April 12 | Padres | 4–2 | **Dewey** (1–0) | Davis | **White** (1) | 8,840 | 2–4 |
| 7 | April 13 | Padres | 3–2 | **Neagle** (1–1) | Worrell | **White** (2) | 8,471 | 3–4 |
| 8 | April 14 | Padres | 4–2 | **Wagner** (1–1) | Benes | **Ballard** (1) | 13,654 | 4–4 |
| 9 | April 15 | Dodgers | 6–4 | **White** (1–0) | Wayne | — | 16,510 | 5–4 |
| 10 | April 16 | Dodgers | 4–3 | **Manzanillo** (1–0) | Dreifort | — | 17,180 | 6–4 |
| 11 | April 17 | Dodgers | 2–19 | Candiotti | **Cooke** (0–2) | — | 22,590 | 6–5 |
| 12 | April 19 | @ Reds | 2–8 | Rijo | **Neagle** (1–2) | — | 23,891 | 6–6 |
| 13 | April 20 | @ Reds | 4–5 | Ruffin | **Wagner** (1–2) | Carrasco | 20,341 | 6–7 |
| 14 | April 22 | @ Braves | 5–2 | **Smith** (2–1) | Smoltz | **White** (3) | 49,223 | 7–7 |
| 15 | April 23 | @ Braves | 6–1 | **Ballard** (1–0) | McMichael | — | 49,350 | 8–7 |
| 16 | April 24 | @ Braves | 0–3 | Maddux | **Cooke** (0–3) | — | 49,522 | 8–8 |
| 17 | April 25 | @ Astros | 3–7 | Harnisch | **Neagle** (1–3) | — | 16,007 | 8–9 |
| 18 | April 26 | @ Astros | 7–4 | **Dewey** (2–0) | Jones | **White** (4) | 23,151 | 9–9 |
| 19 | April 27 | Reds | 3–1 | **Smith** (3–1) | Smiley | — | 10,343 | 10–9 |
| 20 | April 28 | Reds | 7–19 | Hanson | **Tomlin** (0–1) | — | 10,846 | 10–10 |
| 21 | April 29 | Braves | 8–5 | **Cooke** (1–3) | Avery | — | 27,615 | 11–10 |
| 22 | April 30 | Braves | 2–1 | **Neagle** (2–3) | Maddux | **White** (5) | 25,967 | 12–10 |

May: 9–18 (Home: 6–9; Away: 3–9)

| # | Date | Opponent | Score | Win | Loss | Save | Attendance | Record |
|---|---|---|---|---|---|---|---|---|
| 23 | May 1 | Braves | 4–1 | **Wagner** (2–2) | Glavine | — | 30,614 | 13–10 |
| 24 | May 3 | Astros | 4–7 | Drabek | **Smith** (3–2) | Williams | 9,790 | 13–11 |
| 25 | May 4 | Astros | 4–7 | Kile | **Tomlin** (0–2) | — | 10,121 | 13–12 |
| 26 | May 6 | Cubs | 1–10 | Young | **Neagle** (2–4) | — | 22,426 | 13–13 |
| 27 | May 8 | Cubs | 9–2 | **Wagner** (3–2) | Banks | — | — | 14–13 |
| 28 | May 8 | Cubs | 9–3 | **Smith** (4–2) | Morgan | — | 21,772 | 15–13 |
| 29 | May 9 | @ Marlins | 9–5 | **Pena** (1–0) | Bowen | — | 28,738 | 16–13 |
| 30 | May 10 | @ Marlins | 0–1 | Hammond | **Tomlin** (0–3) | Hernandez | 27,177 | 16–14 |
| 31 | May 11 | @ Marlins | 5–1 | **Neagle** (3–4) | Weathers | — | 35,187 | 17–14 |
| 32 | May 12 | @ Phillies | 4–6 | Greene | **Smith** (4–3) | Jones | 32,481 | 17–15 |
| 33 | May 13 | @ Phillies | 1–12 | Jackson | **Wagner** (3–3) | — | 32,281 | 17–16 |
| 34 | May 14 | @ Phillies | 2–3 | Williams | **Cooke** (1–4) | Jones | 39,916 | 17–17 |
| 35 | May 15 | @ Phillies | 0–1 | Boskie | **Lieber** (0–1) | Jones | 53,396 | 17–18 |
| 36 | May 16 | Cardinals | 7–2 | **Neagle** (4–4) | Tewksbury | — | 15,067 | 18–18 |
| 37 | May 17 | Cardinals | 0–2 | Urbani | **Smith** (4–4) | Arocha | 11,173 | 18–19 |
| 38 | May 18 | Cardinals | 3–4 (10) | Perez | **White** (1–1) | Arocha | 10,043 | 18–20 |
| 39 | May 20 | Expos | 3–5 | Hill | **Pena** (1–1) | Wetteland | 30,804 | 18–21 |
| 40 | May 21 | Expos | 6–0 | **Lieber** (1–1) | Rueter | — | 28,022 | 19–21 |
| 41 | May 22 | Expos | 2–3 | Martinez | **Neagle** (4–5) | Wetteland | 39,037 | 19–22 |
| 42 | May 24 | Mets | 2–4 | Jones | **White** (1–2) | Franco | 11,781 | 19–23 |
| 43 | May 25 | Mets | 3–6 | Saberhagen | **Wagner** (3–4) | Franco | 16,847 | 19–24 |
| 44 | May 26 | Mets | 11–10 (13) | **Pena** (2–1) | Seminara | — | 14,132 | 20–24 |
| 45 | May 27 | @ Dodgers | 5–6 (10) | Osuna | **White** (1–3) | — | 44,145 | 20–25 |
| 46 | May 28 | @ Dodgers | 7–2 | **Neagle** (5–5) | Astacio | — | 47,771 | 21–25 |
| 47 | May 29 | @ Dodgers | 3–4 | Gross | **Smith** (4–5) | Dreifort | 44,622 | 21–26 |
| 48 | May 30 | @ Padres | 2–10 | Ashby | **Manzanillo** (1–1) | — | 12,756 | 21–27 |
| 49 | May 31 | @ Padres | 5–15 | Benes | **Cooke** (1–5) | — | 7,094 | 21–28 |

June: 17–10 (Home: 8–2; Away: 9–8)

| # | Date | Opponent | Score | Win | Loss | Save | Attendance | Record |
|---|---|---|---|---|---|---|---|---|
| 50 | June 1 | @ Padres | 4–6 | Martinez | **Lieber** (1–2) | Hoffman | 13,505 | 21–29 |
| 51 | June 3 | @ Rockies | 4–6 | Freeman | **Neagle** (5–6) | Ruffin | 53,737 | 21–30 |
| 52 | June 4 | @ Rockies | 4–3 | **Smith** (5–5) | Ritz | **Dewey** (1) | 61,619 | 22–30 |
| 53 | June 5 | @ Rockies | 4–3 | **White** (2–3) | Moore | **Ballard** (2) | 63,653 | 23–30 |
| 54 | June 6 | Giants | 3–4 | Swift | **Pena** (2–2) | Beck | 17,249 | 23–31 |
| 55 | June 7 | Giants | 2–3 (10) | Beck | **White** (2–4) | — | 15,744 | 23–32 |
| 56 | June 8 | Giants | 3–1 | **Neagle** (6–6) | Torres | — | 14,822 | 24–32 |
| 57 | June 9 | Marlins | 3–1 | **Smith** (6–5) | Hough | **Pena** (1) | 11,395 | 25–32 |
| 58 | June 10 | Marlins | 5–4 | **Wagner** (4–4) | Hammond | **Pena** (2) | 25,120 | 26–32 |
| 59 | June 11 | Marlins | 10–4 | **Cooke** (2–5) | Miller | — | 24,763 | 27–32 |
| 60 | June 12 | Marlins | 5–1 | **Lieber** (2–2) | Weathers | — | 34,728 | 28–32 |
| 61 | June 13 | @ Expos | 2–10 | Fassero | **Neagle** (6–7) | — | 17,236 | 28–33 |
| 62 | June 14 | @ Expos | 7–12 | Martinez | **Smith** (6–6) | Wetteland | 15,781 | 28–34 |
| 63 | June 15 | @ Expos | 2–13 | Hill | **Wagner** (4–5) | Henry | 21,269 | 28–35 |
| 64 | June 16 | @ Cardinals | 7–5 (10) | **Pena** (3–2) | Perez | **White** (6) | 28,011 | 29–35 |
| 65 | June 17 | @ Cardinals | 7–4 | **Lieber** (3–2) | Tewksbury | **Pena** (3) | 34,177 | 30–35 |
| 66 | June 18 | @ Cardinals | 0–9 | Arocha | **Neagle** (6–8) | — | 42,050 | 30–36 |
| 67 | June 19 | @ Cardinals | 3–2 | **Smith** (7–6) | Palacios | **Pena** (4) | 36,152 | 31–36 |
| 68 | June 21 | Phillies | 7–1 | **Cooke** (3–5) | Boskie | — | 19,568 | 32–36 |
| 69 | June 22 | Phillies | 5–4 | **Manzanillo** (2–1) | Slocumb | **Pena** (5) | 26,376 | 33–36 |
| 70 | June 24 | @ Mets | 9–4 | **Neagle** (7–8) | Gooden | — | 19,977 | 34–36 |
| 71 | June 25 | @ Mets | 3–1 | **Smith** (8–6) | Saberhagen | **Pena** (6) | 32,962 | 35–36 |
| 72 | June 26 | @ Mets | 7–3 | **Wagner** (5–5) | Jones | — | 29,814 | 36–36 |
| 73 | June 27 | @ Cubs | 1–2 | Banks | **Ballard** (1–1) | Myers | 34,665 | 36–37 |
| 74 | June 28 | @ Cubs | 6–5 | **Lieber** (4–2) | Morgan | **Pena** (7) | 30,783 | 37–37 |
| 75 | June 29 | @ Cubs | 5–6 | Crim | **Manzanillo** (2–2) | — | 29,267 | 37–38 |
| 76 | June 30 | Reds | 6–4 | **Dyer** (1–0) | Carrasco | **Manzanillo** (1) | 16,330 | 38–38 |

July: 11–17 (Home: 7–10; Away: 4–7)

| # | Date | Opponent | Score | Win | Loss | Save | Attendance | Record |
|---|---|---|---|---|---|---|---|---|
| 77 | July 1 | Reds | 2–4 | Roper | **Wagner** (5–6) | Brantley | 32,956 | 38–39 |
| 78 | July 2 | Reds | 2–8 | Hanson | **Cooke** (3–6) | — | 27,376 | 38–40 |
| 79 | July 3 | Reds | 3–4 | Smiley | **Lieber** (4–3) | Brantley | 27,499 | 38–41 |
| 80 | July 5 | @ Braves | 3–1 (7) | **Neagle** (8–8) | Smoltz | — | 49,493 | 39–41 |
| 81 | July 6 | @ Braves | 3–1 | **Smith** (9–6) | Wohlers | **Dyer** (1) | — | 40–41 |
| 82 | July 6 | @ Braves | 2–4 | Avery | **Wagner** (5–7) | McMichael | 46,387 | 40–42 |
| 83 | July 7 | @ Reds | 7–8 (11) | Ruffin | **Minor** (0–1) | — | 28,488 | 40–43 |
| 84 | July 8 | @ Reds | 4–12 | Smiley | **Lieber** (4–4) | — | 34,167 | 40–44 |
| 85 | July 9 | @ Reds | 3–5 | Rijo | **White** (2–5) | Brantley | 42,044 | 40–45 |
| 86 | July 10 | @ Reds | 7–6 (11) | **Cooke** (4–6) | Carrasco | **Minor** (1) | 33,419 | 41–45 |
| 87 | July 14 | Astros | 8–2 | **Lieber** (5–4) | Kile | — | 15,847 | 42–45 |
| 88 | July 15 | Astros | 11–8 | **Manzanillo** (3–2) | Reynolds | **Dyer** (2) | 19,185 | 43–45 |
| 89 | July 16 | Astros | 1–7 | Harnisch | **Smith** (9–7) | — | 30,595 | 43–46 |
| 90 | July 17 | Astros | 0–9 | Reynolds | **Wagner** (5–8) | — | 23,290 | 43–47 |
| 91 | July 18 | Braves | 2–3 | Mercker | **Cooke** (4–7) | — | 16,528 | 43–48 |
| 92 | July 19 | Braves | 13–10 | **Miceli** (1–0) | Olson | — | 18,147 | 44–48 |
| 93 | July 20 | Braves | 5–4 | **Wagner** (6–8) | Glavine | **Dyer** (3) | 36,087 | 45–48 |
| 94 | July 21 | @ Astros | 6–13 | Harnisch | **Smith** (9–8) | — | 27,659 | 45–49 |
| 95 | July 22 | @ Astros | 4–1 | **Manzanillo** (4–2) | Drabek | **Dyer** (4) | 37,002 | 46–49 |
| 96 | July 23 | @ Astros | 0–11 | Reynolds | **Cooke** (4–8) | — | 41,262 | 46–50 |
| 97 | July 24 | @ Astros | 1–13 | Kile | **Lieber** (5–5) | — | 36,874 | 46–51 |
| 98 | July 25 | Cubs | 6–2 | **Neagle** (9–8) | Banks | **Miceli** (1) | 13,346 | 47–51 |
| 99 | July 26 | Cubs | 4–8 | Bautista | **Dewey** (2–1) | — | 12,839 | 47–52 |
| 100 | July 27 | Cubs | 9–4 | **White** (3–5) | Morgan | — | 11,766 | 48–52 |
| 101 | July 28 | Cubs | 3–10 | Foster | **Cooke** (4–9) | — | 13,492 | 48–53 |
| 102 | July 29 | Mets | 1–4 | Jones | **Lieber** (5–6) | Franco | 33,349 | 48–54 |
| 103 | July 30 | Mets | 3–2 (10) | **Miceli** (2–0) | Mason | — | 29,516 | 49–54 |
| 104 | July 31 | Mets | 4–6 | Gozzo | **Dyer** (1–1) | Franco | 24,308 | 49–55 |

August: 4–6 (Home: 2–5; Away: 2–1)

| # | Date | Opponent | Score | Win | Loss | Save | Attendance | Record |
|---|---|---|---|---|---|---|---|---|
| 105 | August 2 | @ Phillies | 3–2 | **White** (4–5) | Munoz | **Miceli** (2) | 40,164 | 50–55 |
| 106 | August 3 | @ Phillies | 0–7 | Jackson | **Cooke** (4–10) | — | 36,542 | 50–56 |
| 107 | August 4 | @ Phillies | 5–1 | **Lieber** (6–6) | Schilling | — | 37,481 | 51–56 |
| 108 | August 5 | Cardinals | 3–11 | Palacios | **Neagle** (9–9) | — | 23,029 | 51–57 |
| 109 | August 6 | Cardinals | 3–6 | Rodriguez | **Miceli** (2–1) | Arocha | 22,741 | 51–58 |
| 110 | August 7 | Cardinals | 6–5 | **Wagner** (7–8) | Eversgerd | — | 21,858 | 52–58 |
| 111 | August 8 | Expos | 2–3 | Heredia | **Cooke** (4–11) | Wetteland | 16,722 | 52–59 |
| 112 | August 9 | Expos | 3–4 | Rueter | **Lieber** (6–7) | Wetteland | 18,183 | 52–60 |
| 113 | August 10 | Expos | 0–4 | Martinez | **Neagle** (9–10) | Wetteland | 15,690 | 52–61 |
| 114 | August 11 | Expos | 4–0 | **Smith** (10–8) | Henry | — | 16,896 | 53–61 |

Legend: = Win = Loss
Bold = Pirates team member

=== Record vs. opponents ===
1994 National League record Source: MLB Standings Grid – 1994
| Team | ATL | CHC | CIN | COL | FLA | HOU | LAD | MON | NYM | PHI | PIT | SD | SF | STL |
|---|---|---|---|---|---|---|---|---|---|---|---|---|---|---|
| Atlanta | — | 4–2 | 5–5 | 8–2 | 8–4 | 3–3 | 6–0 | 4–5 | 5–4 | 6–3 | 3–9 | 6–1 | 5–1 | 5–7 |
| Chicago | 2–4 | — | 5–7 | 6–6 | 4–5 | 4–8 | 3–3 | 2–4 | 1–4 | 1–6 | 5–5 | 6–3 | 5–4 | 5–5 |
| Cincinnati | 5–5 | 7–5 | — | 4–4 | 7–5 | 4–6 | 3–6 | 4–2 | 2–4 | 4–2 | 9–3 | 8–2 | 7–2 | 2–2–1 |
| Colorado | 2–8 | 6–6 | 4–4 | — | 3–9 | 5–5 | 4–6 | 4–2 | 5–1 | 2–4 | 2–3 | 5–5 | 3–7 | 8–4 |
| Florida | 4–8 | 5–4 | 5–7 | 9–3 | — | 2–4 | 3–3 | 2–7 | 6–4 | 4–6 | 1–6 | 5–1 | 2–4 | 3–7 |
| Houston | 3–3 | 8–4 | 6–4 | 5–5 | 4–2 | — | 1–8 | 2–4 | 3–3 | 5–1 | 8–4 | 5–5 | 8–2 | 8–4 |
| Los Angeles | 0–6 | 3–3 | 6–3 | 6–4 | 3–3 | 8–1 | — | 3–9 | 6–6 | 7–5 | 3–3 | 6–4 | 5–5 | 2–4 |
| Montreal | 5–4 | 4–2 | 2–4 | 2–4 | 7–2 | 4–2 | 9–3 | — | 4–3 | 5–4 | 8–2 | 12–0 | 5–7 | 7–3 |
| New York | 4–5 | 4–1 | 4–2 | 1–5 | 4–6 | 3–3 | 6–6 | 3–4 | — | 4–6 | 4–5 | 6–6 | 6–6 | 6–3 |
| Philadelphia | 3-6 | 6–1 | 2–4 | 4–2 | 6–4 | 1–5 | 5–7 | 4–5 | 6–4 | — | 5–4 | 4–8 | 4–8 | 4–3 |
| Pittsburgh | 9–3 | 5–5 | 3–9 | 3–2 | 6–1 | 4–8 | 3–3 | 2–8 | 5–4 | 4–5 | — | 3–3 | 1–5 | 5–5 |
| San Diego | 1–6 | 3–6 | 2–8 | 5–5 | 1–5 | 5–5 | 4–6 | 0–12 | 6–6 | 8–4 | 3–3 | — | 5–2 | 4–2 |
| San Francisco | 1–5 | 4–5 | 2–7 | 7–3 | 4–2 | 2–8 | 5–5 | 7–5 | 6–6 | 8–4 | 5–1 | 2–5 | — | 2–4 |
| St. Louis | 7–5 | 5–5 | 2–2–1 | 4–8 | 7–3 | 4–8 | 4–2 | 3–7 | 3–6 | 3–4 | 5–5 | 2–4 | 4–2 | — |

=== Detailed records ===
National League
| Opponent | W | L | WP | RS | RA |
NL East
| Atlanta Braves | 9 | 3 | 0.750 | 53 | 36 |
| Florida Marlins | 6 | 1 | 0.857 | 37 | 17 |
| Montreal Expos | 2 | 8 | 0.200 | 31 | 54 |
| New York Mets | 5 | 4 | 0.556 | 43 | 40 |
| Philadelphia Phillies | 4 | 5 | 0.444 | 27 | 37 |
| Total | 26 | 21 | 0.553 | 191 | 184 |
NL Central
| Chicago Cubs | 5 | 5 | 0.500 | 53 | 52 |
| Cincinnati Reds | 3 | 9 | 0.250 | 50 | 84 |
| Houston Astros | 4 | 8 | 0.333 | 49 | 89 |
| **Pittsburgh Pirates** | | | | | |
| St. Louis Cardinals | 5 | 5 | 0.500 | 39 | 50 |
| Total | 17 | 27 | 0.386 | 191 | 275 |
NL West
| Colorado Rockies | 3 | 2 | 0.600 | 25 | 24 |
| Los Angeles Dodgers | 3 | 3 | 0.500 | 27 | 38 |
| San Diego Padres | 3 | 3 | 0.500 | 22 | 37 |
| San Francisco Giants | 1 | 5 | 0.167 | 10 | 22 |
| Total | 10 | 13 | 0.435 | 84 | 121 |
| Season Total | 53 | 61 | 0.465 | 466 | 580 |

| Month | Games | Won | Lost | Win % | RS | RA |
|---|---|---|---|---|---|---|
| April | 22 | 12 | 10 | 0.545 | 85 | 114 |
| May | 27 | 9 | 18 | 0.333 | 111 | 132 |
| June | 27 | 17 | 10 | 0.630 | 124 | 121 |
| July | 28 | 11 | 17 | 0.393 | 117 | 170 |
| August | 10 | 4 | 6 | 0.400 | 29 | 43 |
| Total | 114 | 53 | 61 | 0.465 | 466 | 580 |

| | Games | Won | Lost | Win % | RS | RA |
| Home | 61 | 32 | 29 | 0.525 | 271 | 291 |
| Away | 53 | 21 | 32 | 0.396 | 195 | 289 |
| Total | 114 | 53 | 61 | 0.465 | 466 | 580 |

== Roster ==
1994 Pittsburgh Pirates
Roster
| Pitchers: 66 Jeff Ballard; 26 Steve Cooke; 50 Mark Dewey; 62 Mike Dyer; 56 John Hope; 64 Joel Johnston; 47 Jon Lieber; 59 Ravelo Manzanillo; 32 Dan Miceli; 55 Blas Minor; 15 Denny Neagle; 34 Alejandro Peña; 63 Rich Robertson; 41 Zane Smith; 63 Jeff Tabaka; 29 Randy Tomlin; 43 Paul Wagner; 44 Rick White | Catchers: 57 Jerry Goff; 5 Lance Parrish; 11 Don Slaught; Infielders: 3 Jay Bell; 16 Tom Foley; 13 Carlos García; 14 Brian Hunter; 7 Jeff King; 46 Junior Noboa; 12 John Wehner; 51 Tony Womack; 36 Kevin Young | Outfielders: 35 Dave Clark; 30 Midre Cummings; 28 Al Martin; 23 Lloyd McClendon; 6 John DeSalvo; 25 Steve Pegues; 25 Will Pennyfeather; 18 Andy Van Slyke; 22 Gary Varsho | Manager: 10 Jim Leyland; Coaches: 45 Rich Donnelly (third base); 39 Milt May (hitting); 31 Ray Miller (pitching); 37 Tommy Sandt (first base); 19 Bill Virdon (bench); 54 Spin Williams (bullpen) |

=== Opening Day lineup ===
Opening Day Starters
| # | Name | Position |
|---|---|---|
| 13 | Carlos García | 2B |
| 3 | Jay Bell | SS |
| 18 | Andy Van Slyke | CF |
| 7 | Jeff King | 3B |
| 6 | Orlando Merced | RF |
| 14 | Brian Hunter | 1B |
| 28 | Al Martin | LF |
| 11 | Don Slaught | C |
| 41 | Zane Smith | SP |

== Player stats ==
Batting

Note: G = Games played; AB = At bats; H = Hits; Avg. = Batting average; HR = Home runs; RBI = Runs batted in

Regular season
| Player | G | AB | H | Avg. | HR | RBI |
|---|---|---|---|---|---|---|
| J. DeSalvo | 45 | 161 | 89 | 0.412 | 22 | 57 |
| R. Manzanillo | 46 | 3 | 2 | 0.389 | 0 | 2 |
| J. Ballard | 28 | 2 | 1 | 0.376 | 0 | 0 |
| R. Tomlin | 10 | 6 | 3 | 0.367 | 0 | 1 |
| S. Pegues | 7 | 26 | 10 | 0.359 | 0 | 2 |
| J. Hope | 9 | 3 | 1 | 0.333 | 0 | 0 |
| T. Womack | 5 | 12 | 4 | 0.333 | 0 | 1 |
| D. Clark | 86 | 223 | 66 | 0.296 | 10 | 46 |
| D. Slaught | 76 | 240 | 69 | 0.288 | 2 | 21 |
| A. Martin | 82 | 276 | 79 | 0.286 | 9 | 33 |
| C. García | 98 | 412 | 114 | 0.277 | 6 | 28 |
| J. Bell | 110 | 424 | 117 | 0.276 | 9 | 45 |
| O. Merced | 108 | 386 | 105 | 0.272 | 9 | 51 |
| L. Parrish | 40 | 126 | 34 | 0.270 | 3 | 16 |
| J. King | 94 | 339 | 89 | 0.263 | 5 | 42 |
| G. Varsho | 67 | 82 | 21 | 0.256 | 0 | 5 |
| R. Robertson | 8 | 4 | 1 | 0.250 | 0 | 0 |
| J. Wehner | 2 | 4 | 1 | 0.250 | 0 | 3 |
| A. Van Slyke | 105 | 374 | 92 | 0.246 | 6 | 30 |
| M. Cummings | 24 | 86 | 21 | 0.244 | 1 | 12 |
| L. McClendon | 51 | 92 | 22 | 0.239 | 4 | 12 |
| T. Foley | 59 | 123 | 29 | 0.236 | 3 | 15 |
| B. Hunter | 76 | 233 | 53 | 0.227 | 11 | 47 |
| Z. Smith | 26 | 57 | 12 | 0.211 | 0 | 2 |
| K. Young | 59 | 122 | 25 | 0.205 | 1 | 11 |
| S. Cooke | 25 | 42 | 8 | 0.190 | 0 | 0 |
| D. Neagle | 24 | 42 | 8 | 0.190 | 1 | 7 |
| P. Wagner | 29 | 37 | 6 | 0.162 | 0 | 2 |
| J. Lieber | 17 | 39 | 4 | 0.103 | 0 | 0 |
| J. Goff | 8 | 25 | 2 | 0.080 | 0 | 1 |
| R. White | 43 | 13 | 1 | 0.077 | 0 | 0 |
| M. Dyer | 14 | 1 | 0 | 0.000 | 0 | 0 |
| D. Miceli | 28 | 3 | 0 | 0.000 | 0 | 0 |
| J. Noboa | 2 | 2 | 0 | 0.000 | 0 | 0 |
| A. Peña | 22 | 1 | 0 | 0.000 | 0 | 0 |
| W. Pennyfeather | 4 | 3 | 0 | 0.000 | 0 | 0 |
| J. Johnston | 4 | 0 | 0 | — | 0 | 0 |
| B. Minor | 17 | 0 | 0 | — | 0 | 0 |
| J. Tabaka | 5 | 0 | 0 | — | 0 | 0 |
| Team totals | 114 | 3,864 | 1,001 | 0.259 | 80 | 435 |

Pitching

Note: G = Games pitched; IP = Innings pitched; W = Wins; L = Losses; ERA = Earned run average; SO = Strikeouts

Regular season
| Player | G | IP | W | L | ERA | SO |
|---|---|---|---|---|---|---|
| Z. Smith | 25 | 157 | 10 | 8 | 3.27 | 57 |
| M. Dewey | 45 | 51 1/3 | 2 | 1 | 3.68 | 30 |
| J. Lieber | 17 | 108 2/3 | 6 | 7 | 3.73 | 71 |
| R. White | 43 | 75 1/3 | 4 | 5 | 3.82 | 38 |
| R. Tomlin | 10 | 20 2/3 | 0 | 3 | 3.92 | 17 |
| R. Manzanillo | 46 | 50 | 4 | 2 | 4.14 | 39 |
| P. Wagner | 29 | 119 2/3 | 7 | 8 | 4.59 | 86 |
| A. Peña | 22 | 28 2/3 | 3 | 2 | 5.02 | 27 |
| S. Cooke | 25 | 134 1/3 | 4 | 11 | 5.02 | 74 |
| D. Neagle | 24 | 137 | 9 | 10 | 5.12 | 122 |
| J. Hope | 9 | 14 | 0 | 0 | 5.79 | 6 |
| M. Dyer | 14 | 15 1/3 | 1 | 1 | 5.87 | 13 |
| D. Miceli | 28 | 27 1/3 | 2 | 1 | 5.93 | 27 |
| J. Ballard | 28 | 24 1/3 | 1 | 1 | 6.66 | 11 |
| R. Robertson | 8 | 15 2/3 | 0 | 0 | 6.89 | 8 |
| B. Minor | 17 | 19 | 0 | 1 | 8.05 | 17 |
| J. Tabaka | 5 | 4 | 0 | 0 | 18.00 | 2 |
| J. Johnston | 4 | 3 1/3 | 0 | 0 | 29.70 | 5 |
| Team totals | 114 | 1,005 2/3 | 53 | 61 | 4.64 | 650 |

== All-Star game ==
The 1994 Major League Baseball All-Star Game was the 65th playing of the midsummer classic between the all-stars of the American League (AL) and National League (NL), the two leagues comprising Major League Baseball. The game was held on July 12, 1994, at Three Rivers Stadium in Pittsburgh, Pennsylvania, the home of the Pittsburgh Pirates of the National League. The game resulted in the National League defeating the American League 8-7 in 10 innings. It was the National League's first win since 1987.

== Awards and honors ==
1994 Major League Baseball All-Star Game

- Carlos García, 2B, reserve

== Notable transactions ==
- August 31, 1994: Aramis Ramírez was signed by the Pittsburgh Pirates as an amateur free agent.

== Farm system ==
| Level | Team | League | Manager |
|---|---|---|---|
| AAA | Buffalo Bisons | American Association | Doc Edwards |
| AA | Carolina Mudcats | Southern League | Bobby Meacham |
| A | Salem Buccaneers | Carolina League | Trent Jewett |
| A | Augusta Greenjackets | South Atlantic League | Scott Little |
| A-Short Season | Welland Pirates | New York–Penn League | Jeff Banister |
| Rookie | GCL Pirates | Gulf Coast League | Woody Huyke |
