= 1991 National League Championship Series =

23rd edition of Major League Baseball's National League Championship Series

Team (Wins)	Managers	Season
Atlanta Braves (4)	Bobby Cox	94–68, .580, GA: 1
Pittsburgh Pirates (3)	Jim Leyland	98–64, .605, GA: 14
- Dates: October 9–17
- MVP: Steve Avery (Atlanta)
- Umpires: Doug Harvey; Frank Pulli; Dana DeMuth; Eric Gregg; Bob Davidson; Bruce Froemming

Broadcast
- Television: CBS
- TV announcers: Jack Buck and Tim McCarver
- Radio: CBS
- Radio announcers: John Rooney and Jerry Coleman

The 1991 National League Championship Series was a best-of-seven semifinal series in Major League Baseball’s 1991 postseason played between the Atlanta Braves (94–68) and the Pittsburgh Pirates (98–64), with the Braves coming out on top in the Series 4–3. It was considered one of the best-pitched seven-game series of the modern era, featuring three 1–0 finishes and four shutouts, as well as four one-run games. The Braves went on to lose in the World Series to the Minnesota Twins in seven games.

The Pirates had the best record in the National League in 1991, and were the first NL East team to win consecutive division championships since the Philadelphia Phillies, their in-state rivals, during their run of three straight NL East championships, from 1976 to 1978 (in fact, the Pirates won the 1991 NL East title in a game against their rivals). and were expected to win this Series and advance to the World Series. However, the Braves, who went from last place in the National League West in 1990 to first place in the division in 1991, were able to pull off the upset in their memorable run to the World Series versus the Minnesota Twins.

== Summary ==
=== Pittsburgh Pirates vs. Atlanta Braves ===
Atlanta won the series, 4–3.

Game	Date	Score	Location	Time	Attendance
1	October 9	Atlanta Braves – 1, Pittsburgh Pirates – 5	Three Rivers Stadium	2:51	57,347
2	October 10	Atlanta Braves – 1, Pittsburgh Pirates – 0	Three Rivers Stadium	2:46	57,533
3	October 12	Pittsburgh Pirates – 3, Atlanta Braves – 10	Atlanta–Fulton County Stadium	3:21	50,905
4	October 13	Pittsburgh Pirates – 3, Atlanta Braves – 2 (10)	Atlanta–Fulton County Stadium	3:43	51,109
5	October 14	Pittsburgh Pirates – 1, Atlanta Braves – 0	Atlanta–Fulton County Stadium	2:51	51,109
6	October 16	Atlanta Braves – 1, Pittsburgh Pirates – 0	Three Rivers Stadium	3:09	54,508
7	October 17	Atlanta Braves – 4, Pittsburgh Pirates – 0	Three Rivers Stadium	3:04	46,932

== Game summaries ==
=== Game 1 ===
Wednesday, October 9, 1991 (8:41 pm EDT) at Three Rivers Stadium in Pittsburgh

Team	1	2	3	4	5	6	7	8	9	R	H	E
Atlanta	0	0	0	0	0	0	0	0	1	1	5	1
Pittsburgh	1	0	2	0	0	1	0	1	X	5	8	1
WP: Doug Drabek (1–0) LP: Tom Glavine (0–1) Sv: Bob Walk (1); Home runs: ATL: David Justice (1); PIT: Andy Van Slyke (1)

The Pirates proved they would be tough to eliminate early when they stifled the Braves offense behind 1990 Cy Young Award winner Doug Drabek and won the first game 5–1. Pittsburgh center fielder Andy Van Slyke's first-inning home run off of 1991 Cy Young Award winner Tom Glavine put them up 1–0. In the third, Jay Bell hit a leadoff single, then Van Slyke's double and Bobby Bonilla's single scored a run each. Steve Buechele doubled to lead off the sixth and scored on Doug Drabek's two-out double. The Pirates scored their last run in the eighth on Jose Lind's bases-loaded sacrifice fly off of Mike Stanton. David Justice hit a home run in the ninth inning off reliever Bob Walk for the Braves' only run.

An injury to Pirates starter Doug Drabek was to have major ramifications for the Series. Drabek slid into third and injured himself in the sixth inning, leaving the game with what appeared to be a pulled hamstring. The injury cost Drabek an early start in either Game 4 or 5, and it ensured he would not be available for a third start in Game 7 if the Series went that far, as it ultimately did.

=== Game 2 ===
Thursday, October 10, 1991 (8:39 pm EDT) at Three Rivers Stadium in Pittsburgh

Team	1	2	3	4	5	6	7	8	9	R	H	E
Atlanta	0	0	0	0	0	1	0	0	0	1	8	0
Pittsburgh	0	0	0	0	0	0	0	0	0	0	6	0
WP: Steve Avery (1–0) LP: Zane Smith (0–1) Sv: Alejandro Peña (1)

In Game 2, both teams were kept in check by the outstanding pitching performances of Zane Smith for Pittsburgh and Steve Avery for Atlanta. However, Avery and the Braves would come out on top 1–0, after David Justice singled to lead off and Mark Lemke picked up a double and the only RBI of the game in the sixth inning. David Justice scored from second when Lemke's seemingly routine grounder got past Pirate third baseman Steve Buechele, allowing Justice to score. Alejandro Peña got the save and the combined shutout was complete. The series was now tied 1–1.

The win snapped a 10-game postseason losing streak for the Braves franchise that began with Game 5 of the 1958 World Series, when the team was still in Milwaukee.

=== Game 3 ===
Saturday, October 12, 1991 (3:00 pm EDT) at Atlanta–Fulton County Stadium in Atlanta

Team	1	2	3	4	5	6	7	8	9	R	H	E
Pittsburgh	1	0	0	1	0	0	1	0	0	3	10	2
Atlanta	4	1	1	0	0	0	1	3	X	10	11	0
WP: John Smoltz (1–0) LP: John Smiley (0–1) Sv: Alejandro Peña (2); Home runs: PIT: Orlando Merced (1), Jay Bell (1); ATL: Greg Olson (1), Ron Gant (1), Sid Bream (1)

With the Series tied at one game apiece, John Smoltz faced off against the Pirates' 20-game winner, John Smiley. Orlando Merced hit Smoltz's first pitch over the right field wall for a home run, but in the bottom of the first, two-out doubles by Ron Gant, David Justice and Brian Hunter put the Braves up 2–1 before Greg Olson's two-run homer to left made it 4–1. In the second, Lonnie Smith was hit by a pitch with two outs and scored on Terry Pendleton's double. Smiley was gone after that inning. In the third, Rafael Belliard's RBI single with two on off of Bill Landrum made it 6–1 Braves. Jose Lind's RBI single in the fourth with two on made it 6–2 Braves, then Jay Bell's home run in the seventh made it 6–3 and knock Smoltz out of the game, but the Braves got that run back in the bottom of the inning on Gant's home run off of Bob Kipper. In the top of the eighth, Alejandro Peña struck out Jay Bell with the bases loaded to end the Pirates' last threat. In the bottom of the inning, Rosario Rodriguez walked two to lead off and after a sacrifice bunt, former Pirate Sid Bream's three-run home run increased the Braves' lead to 10–3. Pena retired the Pirates in order in the ninth to give the Braves a 2–1 series lead.

=== Game 4 ===
Sunday, October 13, 1991 (8:38 pm EDT) at Atlanta–Fulton County Stadium in Atlanta

Team	1	2	3	4	5	6	7	8	9	10	R	H	E
Pittsburgh	0	1	0	0	1	0	0	0	0	1	3	11	1
Atlanta	2	0	0	0	0	0	0	0	0	0	2	7	1
WP: Stan Belinda (1–0) LP: Kent Mercker (0–1)

The lone extra-inning game of the Series came in Atlanta before 51,109 fans. The Braves struck first when Lonnie Smith doubled to lead off the first off of Randy Tomlin, moved to third on a line out, and scored on Ron Gant's groundout, then three straight singles by David Justice, Brian Hunter and Greg Olson made it 2–0 Braves. However, they would not score for the rest of the game. Don Slaught's RBI single with two on in the second off of Charlie Leibrandt cut the lead to 2–1, then Gary Redus singled with two outs in the fifth and scored on a Jay Bell single along with a Braves error to tie the game.

The Pirates tied the series with a run in the top of the tenth when Mike LaValliere, off of Mark Wohlers, singled in Andy Van Slyke, who had stolen second after being walked by Kent Mercker. Stan Belinda retired the Braves in order in the bottom of the inning.

=== Game 5 ===
Monday, October 14, 1991 (3:08 pm EDT) at Atlanta–Fulton County Stadium in Atlanta

Team	1	2	3	4	5	6	7	8	9	R	H	E
Pittsburgh	0	0	0	0	1	0	0	0	0	1	6	2
Atlanta	0	0	0	0	0	0	0	0	0	0	9	1
WP: Zane Smith (1–1) LP: Tom Glavine (0–2) Sv: Roger Mason (1)

Zane Smith had his second excellent game of the Series, but this time he won, beating Tom Glavine and the Braves 1–0 in almost a mirror image of Smith's start in Game 2. However, in Game 2, Smith had given up the one run and lost.

Controversy surrounded this game when David Justice appeared to score on a single to left, but he seemed to miss third base and was called out on an appeal. Replays were inconclusive, but Justice did stumble over third base, and the umpires called him out, preserving Smith's shutout.

The lone run in this game came when José Lind hit a simple RBI single in the fifth.

=== Game 6 ===
Wednesday, October 16, 1991 (8:39 pm EDT) at Three Rivers Stadium in Pittsburgh

Team	1	2	3	4	5	6	7	8	9	R	H	E
Atlanta	0	0	0	0	0	0	0	0	1	1	7	0
Pittsburgh	0	0	0	0	0	0	0	0	0	0	4	0
WP: Steve Avery (2–0) LP: Doug Drabek (1–1) Sv: Alejandro Peña (3)

Pittsburgh hosted one of the best pitcher's duels of all-time on October 16, 1991, between Steve Avery and Doug Drabek. In the end, identical to Avery's last start, a combination of Avery and Alejandro Peña shut out the Pirates for all nine innings. The Pirates only got four hits. However, this time the Braves didn't score a run all the way through eight innings. Drabek matched Avery, pitch for pitch. But in the ninth inning, with the score tied 0–0, Greg Olson raked a double down the left field line that scored Ron Gant, who walked and stole second, and took the lead off a weary Drabek. He had pitched a complete game, but was the loser after the Pirates could not get Gary Varsho home from third in the bottom of the ninth. The Braves had not scored a run since the first inning of Game 4, a futility streak that reached 26 2/3 innings before Gant scored the winning run.

=== Game 7 ===
Thursday, October 17, 1991 (8:39 pm EDT) at Three Rivers Stadium in Pittsburgh

Team	1	2	3	4	5	6	7	8	9	R	H	E
Atlanta	3	0	0	0	1	0	0	0	0	4	6	1
Pittsburgh	0	0	0	0	0	0	0	0	0	0	6	0
WP: John Smoltz (2–0) LP: John Smiley (0–2); Home runs: ATL: Brian Hunter (1); PIT: None

The Braves scored three runs in the first inning on Ron Gant's sacrifice fly with runners on first and third, followed by a Brian Hunter two-run home run, and never looked back. Twenty-game winner John Smiley made the start, fared poorly, was yanked after two-thirds of an inning and lost to John Smoltz, who shut out the Pirates. Although Bob Walk was masterful in middle relief, it was too little, too late, even though he pulled his groin trying to help his cause attempting to stretch a single into a double in the bottom of the seventh. Hunter's RBI double in the fifth with two on capped the scoring as the Braves won 4–0 and nabbed the pennant. After Atlanta had gone 26 2/3 innings without scoring, the Pirates themselves went the final 22 1/3 innings without scoring. That streak would reach 30 innings before José Lind snapped it with a home run in the eighth inning of Game 1 in the 1992 NLCS.

Avery won the Series MVP award. Pitching 16 1/3 innings, the Braves starter did not allow a run, giving up nine hits and walking four while striking out 17. Avery said, "It's been the best time of my life."

The Braves scored 14 runs in the games Smiley pitched (Games 3 and 7), including nine off Smiley, but only five runs in the other five games combined. Smiley had been the Pirates' biggest winner in 1991, notching 20 victories for the only time in his career.

The Atlanta Braves' World Series appearance was their first since 1958, and their first since moving to Atlanta in 1966. The Braves lost a memorable and dramatic seven-game series to the Minnesota Twins.

== Composite box ==
1991 NLCS (4–3): Atlanta Braves over Pittsburgh Pirates

Team	1	2	3	4	5	6	7	8	9	10	R	H	E
Atlanta Braves	9	1	1	0	1	1	1	3	2	0	19	53	4
Pittsburgh Pirates	2	1	2	1	2	1	1	1	0	1	12	51	6
Total attendance: 369,443 Average attendance: 52,778
