= José Lind =

Puerto Rican baseball player (born 1964)

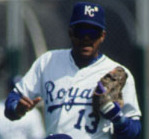
- Lind with the Kansas City Royals in 1994
- Second baseman
- Born: May 1, 1964 (age 62); Toa Baja, Puerto Rico
- Batted: Right Threw: Right

MLB debut
- August 28, 1987, for the Pittsburgh Pirates

Last MLB appearance
- August 29, 1995, for the California Angels

MLB statistics
- Batting average: .254
- Home runs: 9
- Runs batted in: 324
- Stats at Baseball Reference

Teams
- Pittsburgh Pirates (1987–1992); Kansas City Royals (1993–1995); California Angels (1995)

Career highlights and awards
- Gold Glove Award (1992)

José Lind Salgado (/liːnd/ LEEND; born May 1, 1964), nicknamed "Chico", is a Puerto Rican former Major League Baseball (MLB) second baseman and former manager of the Atlantic League's Bridgeport Bluefish. He is the cousin of Onix Concepción, another former MLB player. Primarily a second baseman, Lind was highly regarded for his defensive skills, winning a Gold Glove award in 1992.

== Playing career ==
In 1982, Lind began his professional career by signing with the Pittsburgh Pirates as an undrafted free agent. He did not hit for much power as a prospect, totaling only four home runs in five minor league seasons, but his strong defense helped him ensure a place in the organization's plans. Lind made his major league debut with the Pirates on August 28, 1987, and the next day the Pirates traded incumbent second baseman Johnny Ray to the California Angels, clearing the full-time role for Lind.

Lind would go on to play regularly for the Pirates for five more seasons, including the 1990–1992 squads that were the champions of the NL East. He never again equaled his rookie batting average of .322, but he contributed a strong defensive presence, winning a Gold Glove in 1992, which broke Ryne Sandberg's string of nine consecutive National League Gold Glove awards at second base and was the first by a Pirate second baseman since Bill Mazeroski's string of five consecutive awards from 1963–1967. He also acquired a reputation for whimsical behavior, as one might expect from a man nicknamed "Chico" (Spanish for "Boy"). The photo on his 1991 Upper Deck baseball card shows him jumping over the head of 5'11" teammate Mike LaValliere, and he often surprised fellow players in the clubhouse by playfully brandishing one of the many knives he kept in his locker.

In the ninth inning of the 7th game of the 1992 National League Championship Series (NLCS), Lind committed a crucial fielding error that led to a come-from-behind victory for the Atlanta Braves. He did, however, receive a Gold Glove award for his otherwise stellar defensive play that year.

After the 1992 season, the Pirates traded Lind to the Kansas City Royals for Dennis Moeller and Joel Johnston. His performance declined in Kansas City, and at some point, he began to use cocaine. He walked out on the Royals in the middle of 1995 after his wife filed for divorce, and they placed him on waivers shortly thereafter. The California Angels put in a claim, and he struggled to a .163 batting average over 15 games with them, before getting released on August 31.

1995 was Lind's last major league season. He finished his career with a .254 batting average, a .295 on-base percentage, and a .316 slugging percentage in 3,677 at bats. Defensively, he recorded a .988 fielding percentage, playing every inning at second base.

== Off-field problems ==
Lind's personal life remained troubled after his MLB career ended. Police were called to the home of his ex-wife, Lizza Lind, in July 1996, when he visited in violation of a restraining order and the situation escalated to physical violence, which was witnessed by his daughters. They arrested him for possession of cocaine, and he pleaded guilty to that charge in February of the next year.

On November 21, 1997, highway police in Tampa, Florida, stopped Lind for leaving the scene of an accident. They discovered that he was visibly intoxicated and that he had been driving while naked from the waist down. A search of his car revealed seven cans of beer and one gram of cocaine. Lind ended up spending a year in jail.

== Managing career ==
Lind underwent rehabilitation for his addiction, and after his release from prison he signed with the Bridgeport Bluefish as a player-coach. When manager Duffy Dyer left to take a position with the New York Mets in February 2003, Lind was promoted to fill the vacant position.

He managed the team to two second places finishes in three seasons before a 55–85 record in 2005 resulted in his dismissal. He went 200–192 as manager. He was replaced as manager of Bridgeport by former MLB pitcher Dave LaPoint.
