= Tony Menéndez =

Cuban baseball player (born 1965)

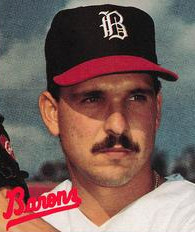
- Menéndez in 1988
- Pitcher
- Born: February 20, 1965 (age 60); Havana, Cuba
- Batted: Right Threw: Right

MLB debut
- June 22, 1992, for the Cincinnati Reds

Last MLB appearance
- May 31, 1994, for the San Francisco Giants

MLB statistics
- Win–loss record: 3–1
- Earned run average: 4.97
- Strikeouts: 20
- Stats at Baseball Reference

Teams
- Cincinnati Reds (1992); Pittsburgh Pirates (1993); San Francisco Giants (1994)

Antonio Gustavo Menéndez Remon (born February 20, 1965) is a Cuban former Major League Baseball pitcher. He played during two seasons at the major league level for the Cincinnati Reds, Pittsburgh Pirates, and San Francisco Giants. He was drafted by the Chicago White Sox in the 1st round (20th pick) of the 1984 amateur draft. Menéndez played his first professional season with their Rookie league Gulf Coast White Sox in 1984, and his last with San Francisco's Triple-A Phoenix Firebirds in 1995.

== Sources ==
- Career statistics from Baseball Reference, or Baseball Reference (Minors)
