= Ben Shelton (baseball) =

American baseball player (born 1969)

- Left fielder
- Born: September 21, 1969 (age 56); Chicago, Illinois, U.S.
- Batted: Right Threw: Left

MLB debut
- June 16, 1993, for the Pittsburgh Pirates

Last MLB appearance
- July 25, 1993, for the Pittsburgh Pirates

MLB statistics
- Batting average: .250
- Home runs: 2
- Runs batted in: 7
- Stats at Baseball Reference

Teams
- Pittsburgh Pirates (1993)

Benjamin Davis (Ben) Shelton (born September 21, 1969) is an American former Major League Baseball (MLB) left fielder who played in 1993 with the Pittsburgh Pirates. He batted right and threw left-handed.

== Early life ==
Shelton played baseball for Oak Park and River Forest High School.

== Professional career ==
=== Draft and minor leagues ===
Shelton was drafted by the Pirates in the second round of the 1987 draft with the 34th overall pick. Shelton played 8 seasons in the minor leagues, for teams such as the GCL Pirates, Salt Lake Buzz, Princeton Pirates, Augusta Pirates, Salem Buccaneers, Carolina Mudcats, Buffalo Bisons, Hardware City Rock Cats, and Trenton Thunder. Across 8 seasons in the minor leagues, Shelton played 770 games, with a .235 batting average.

=== Major leagues ===
In his one season in the major leagues with the Pittsburgh Pirates, he batted .250 with a .542 slugging average across his 15 games. He received his only professional outfield assist from center fielder Al Martin.
