= Greg Olson (baseball) =

American baseball player (born 1960)

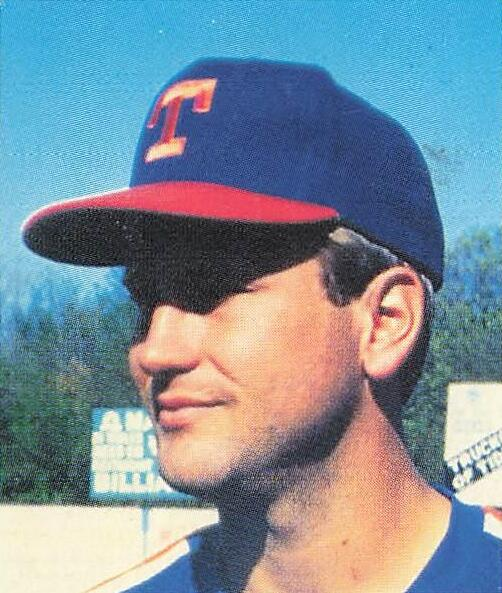
- Olson with the Tidewater Tides c. 1988
- Catcher
- Born: September 6, 1960 (age 66); Marshall, Minnesota, U.S.
- Batted: Right Threw: Right

MLB debut
- June 27, 1989, for the Minnesota Twins

Last MLB appearance
- September 30, 1993, for the Atlanta Braves

MLB statistics
- Batting average: .242
- Home runs: 20
- Runs batted in: 131
- Stats at Baseball Reference

Teams
- Minnesota Twins (1989); Atlanta Braves (1990–1993)

Career highlights and awards
- All-Star (1990)

Gregory William Olson (born September 6, 1960) is an American former professional baseball player. He played in Major League Baseball (MLB) as a catcher from 1989 to 1993 for the Minnesota Twins and the Atlanta Braves. Olson was selected to the 1990 National League All-Star team and appeared in the 1991 World Series with the Braves.

== Baseball career ==
Olson was born in Marshall, Minnesota and attended Edina East High School. He later attended the University of Minnesota and was drafted in the 7th round of the 1982 Major League Baseball draft by the New York Mets. In 1992, Olson was having a career year until a collision with Ken Caminiti of the Houston Astros broke his right leg. Olson played one more year for Atlanta before being released in the off season to make room for rising prospect Javy López. Olson signed with the New York Mets for the 1994 season but was released following spring training, leading to his retirement.

In 414 games over five seasons, Olson posted a .242 batting average (309-for-1275) with 132 runs, 20 home runs, 131 RBI and 137 bases on balls. Defensively, he recorded a .992 fielding percentage as a catcher. In 16 postseason games, he batted .278 (15-for-54) with 6 runs, 4 doubles, 1 home run, 5 RBI, 2 stolen bases and 9 walks.
