= Dennis Moeller =

American baseball player (born 1967)

- Pitcher
- Born: September 15, 1967 (age 58); Tarzana, California, U.S.
- Batted: Right Threw: Left

MLB debut
- July 28, 1992, for the Kansas City Royals

Last MLB appearance
- May 21, 1993, for the Pittsburgh Pirates

MLB statistics
- Win–loss record: 1–3
- Earned run average: 8.39
- Strikeouts: 19
- Stats at Baseball Reference

Teams
- Kansas City Royals (1992); Pittsburgh Pirates (1993)

Dennis Michael Moeller (born September 15, 1967) is an American former Major League Baseball pitcher who played for the Kansas City Royals and Pittsburgh Pirates from 1992 to 1993.

== Before professional baseball ==
Prior to being drafted, Moeller attended Cleveland High School in Reseda, California. He then went on to attend Los Angeles Valley College, and was drafted from there in the 17th round of the 1986 amateur draft.

== Professional baseball ==
Moeller began his professional career in 1986 with the Eugene Emeralds. Used almost entirely as a starter (14 appearances, 11 starts), he went 4–0 with a 3.06 ERA, striking out 65 batters in 61 2/3 innings of work.

The following year, Moeller pitched for the Appleton Foxes, going 2–5 with a 7.20 ERA in 18 games (13 starts). Again with Appleton in 1988, he went 3–5 with a 3.18 ERA in 20 games (18 starts) with them that season.

In 1989, Moeller split time between the Baseball City Royals and Memphis Chicks. For the Baseball City Royals he went 9–0 with a 1.77 ERA in 12 games (11 starts). For the Chicks he went 1–1 with a 2.84 ERA in five starts. Combined, Moeller went 10–1 with a 2.06 ERA in 17 appearances (16 starts). In 96 1/3 innings of work, he allowed only 75 hits.

Despite pitching well in 1989, Moeller slumped in 1990 while pitching for the Chicks and Omaha Royals. For the Chicks he went 7–6 with a 6.25 ERA, and with the Royals he went 5–2 with a 4.02 ERA. Although his combined ERA was 5.16, he posted a record of 12–8.

He spent all of 1991 with the Chicks and Omaha Royals in 1991, making a combined total of 25 starts, and going 11–8 with a 2.95 ERA between them.

Pitching for the Omaha Royals in 1992, Moeller went 8–5 with a 2.46 ERA in 120 2/3 innings of work. His solid performance earned him a promotion to the big league club, and on July 28 he made his major league debut against the Toronto Blue Jays. Moeller started the game, going 4 1/3 innings, allowing four hits, two hits and four runs (although one of them was unearned). Two of the hits he gave up were back-to-back home runs by Kelly Gruber and Candy Maldonado to start off the top of the second inning. The Blue Jays won the game 6–4.

Moeller made a total of five appearances in the majors in 1992, starting four of the games and going 0–3 with a 7.00 ERA. In 18 innings of work, he allowed 24 hits, 14 earned runs, 11 walks and he struck out only six batters. On November 19, 1992, he was traded to the Pirates with Joel Johnston for José Lind.

He made 10 appearances in the big leagues in 1993, going 1–0 with a 9.92 ERA. Despite having a perfect record, he spent the majority of his time in the minors, where he made 24 appearances for the Buffalo Bisons (11 starts). With them, he went 3–4 with a 4.34 ERA. He was granted free agency on October 15, and was signed by the Royals on November 28.

Moeller never again appeared in the major leagues. He played his final game on May 21, 1993. However, he played in the minor leagues in 1994, going 7–6 with a 3.84 ERA in 50 appearances (only one start).

Overall, Moeller made 15 appearances (four starts) in the majors, going 1–3 with an 8.39 ERA. In the minors, he went 60–42 in 215 games (135 starts).

After his playing career was finished, Moeler has worked as a baseball scout.
