= Dave Otto =

American baseball player (born 1964)

North Central Cardinals
- Pitcher
- Born: November 12, 1964 (age 61); Chicago, Illinois, U.S.
- Batted: Left Threw: Left

MLB debut
- September 8, 1987, for the Oakland Athletics

Last MLB appearance
- August 10, 1994, for the Chicago Cubs

MLB statistics
- Win–loss record: 10–22
- Earned run average: 5.06
- Strikeouts: 144
- Stats at Baseball Reference

Teams
- Oakland Athletics (1987–1990); Cleveland Indians (1991–1992); Pittsburgh Pirates (1993); Chicago Cubs (1994)

David Alan Otto (born November 12, 1964) is an American former professional baseball pitcher. He played in Major League Baseball (MLB) from 1987 to 1994 for the Oakland Athletics, Cleveland Indians, Pittsburgh Pirates, and Chicago Cubs. He has been an assistant coach with the North Central College baseball program since 23 January 2025.

== Amateur career ==
Otto is a 1982 graduate of Elk Grove High School. He was also a basketball standout in high school. Otto was originally selected by the Baltimore Orioles in the second round (52nd overall) of the 1982 MLB draft, but elected to attend the University of Missouri instead.

He played DH as well as pitched for the Missouri Tigers from 1983 to 1985. In 1983 and 1984, he played collegiate summer baseball with the Orleans Cardinals of the Cape Cod Baseball League and was named a league all-star in 1984. He was picked in the second round of the 1985 Major League Baseball draft (39th overall) by the Oakland Athletics, with whom he would sign.

== Professional career ==
After three years in the minor leagues, he made his debut on September 8, 1987. He spent four seasons with the Athletics, spending most of the year with the minor league Tacoma Tigers each time; in four seasons with the Athletics he played in nine total games at the major league level. He signed with the Cleveland Indians in 1991, and after two full seasons with them as a starting pitcher, spent a year each as a relief pitcher with the Pittsburgh Pirates and Chicago Cubs, retiring after the 1994 season.

== Broadcasting career ==
Dave Otto often filled in for Ron Santo on the Chicago Cubs radio broadcasts on WGN Radio. He worked alongside Chip Caray on Fox Sports Net during Steve Stone's two-year absence in 2001-2002 and has worked for Comcast SportsNet Chicago.

== Personal ==
Otto was a 2000 inductee to the University of Missouri Sports Hall of Fame.
