= Don Slaught =

American baseball player (born 1958)

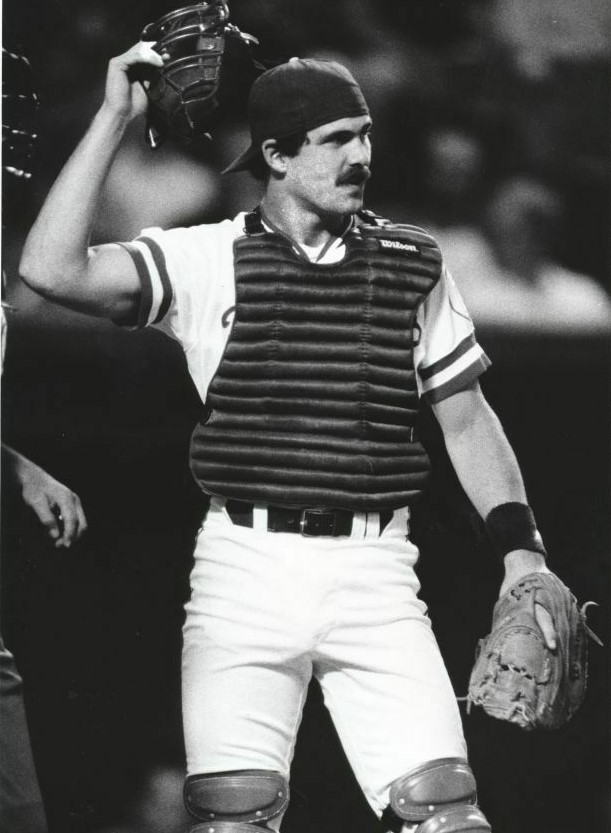
- Catcher
- Born: September 11, 1958 (age 67); Long Beach, California, U.S.
- Batted: Right Threw: Right

MLB debut
- July 6, 1982, for the Kansas City Royals

Last MLB appearance
- May 19, 1997, for the San Diego Padres

MLB statistics
- Batting average: .283
- Home runs: 77
- Runs batted in: 476
- Stats at Baseball Reference

Teams
- Kansas City Royals (1982–1984); Texas Rangers (1985–1987); New York Yankees (1988–1989); Pittsburgh Pirates (1990–1995); California Angels (1996); Chicago White Sox (1996); San Diego Padres (1997)

Donald Martin Slaught (born September 11, 1958), nicknamed "Sluggo", is an American former professional baseball catcher. He played in Major League Baseball (MLB) from 1982 through 1997 for the Kansas City Royals, Texas Rangers, New York Yankees, Pittsburgh Pirates, California Angels, Chicago White Sox, and San Diego Padres.

== Early life ==
Slaught was born in Long Beach, California. He attended El Camino College and UCLA and is a member of the Sigma Chi fraternity. In 1979, Slaught and UCLA pitcher Tim Leary were named to the College Sports Information Directors of America university all-star team. Slaught also was named an Academic All American in 1979. Slaught's 1979 batting average of .428 was a UCLA single-season record that stood until 2001.

He was a 20th-round draft pick of the Milwaukee Brewers in 1979, but elected to stay at UCLA. He was selected by the Kansas City Royals in the seventh round of the next year's draft. He spent about two years in the minor leagues before debuting with the Royals in 1982.

== Career ==
Slaught played with seven major league teams, enjoying some of his best seasons with the Pittsburgh Pirates. Between 1990 and 1992, he platooned at catcher with the left-handed-hitting Mike LaValliere for three division-winning Pirates teams. Slaught hit between .295 and .345 in those three seasons, playing in between 77 and 87 games each season. After Slaught hit .345 in 87 games in 1992, the Pirates released LaValliere in 1995. Slaught saw action in 116 games, the third-busiest season he spent in the major leagues; he hit .300 with 10 home runs and 55 RBI with the increased playing time.

He played with Pittsburgh through 1995, split 1996 between the California Angels and Chicago White Sox, then retired after getting no hits in 20 at bats for the 1997 San Diego Padres.

In 2006, he was named hitting coach of the Detroit Tigers, replacing Bruce Fields. He resigned as the Tigers hitting coach following the 2006 season and was replaced by Lloyd McClendon.

He resides in Rolling Hills, California, with wife Sandy. They have four children. He founded RightView Pro the first video analysis system for baseball and softball licensed by MLB, MLBPA, and the NPF. He is currently the owner of RVP and a partner in OnBaseU. OnBaseU.com.

== Career statistics ==
In 1327 games over 16 seasons, Slaught posted a .283 batting average (1151-for-4063) with 415 runs, 235 doubles, 28 triples, 77 home runs, 476 RBI, 311 bases on balls, .338 on-base percentage and .412 slugging percentage. He finished his career with a .987 fielding percentage. In 18 postseason playoff games, he hit .255 (13-for-51) with 5 runs, 1 home run, 7 RBI and 9 walks.
