= Blas Minor =

American baseball player (born 1966)

- Pitcher
- Born: March 20, 1966 (age 60); Merced, California, U.S.
- Batted: Right Threw: Right

MLB debut
- July 28, 1992, for the Pittsburgh Pirates

Last MLB appearance
- July 14, 1997, for the Houston Astros

MLB statistics
- Win–loss record: 13–10
- Earned run average: 4.40
- Strikeouts: 184
- Stats at Baseball Reference

Teams
- Pittsburgh Pirates (1992–1994); New York Mets (1995–1996); Seattle Mariners (1996); Houston Astros (1997)

Blas Minor Jr. (born March 20, 1966) is an American former professional baseball pitcher who played from 1992 to 1997. He would play for the Pittsburgh Pirates (1992–1994), New York Mets (1995–1996), Seattle Mariners (1996), and Houston Astros (1997).

Minor was named after Saint Blaise. He said "It goes back to my grandparents ... My name is a Mexican version of that name."

After his playing career was over, Minor was a volunteer pitching coach at Hamilton High School in Chandler, Arizona. Minor also worked for the fire department in Chandler. He has been described as a battalion chief, spokesman and public information officer for the department. Minor retired from the department in 2026 after 25 years of service.

Minor is the uncle of baseball player Daulton Jefferies.
