= Will Pennyfeather =

American baseball player (born 1968)

- Center Fielder
- Born: May 25, 1968 (age 58); Perth Amboy, New Jersey
- Batted: Right Threw: Right

MLB debut
- June 27, 1992, for the Pittsburgh Pirates

Last MLB appearance
- April 17, 1994, for the Pittsburgh Pirates

MLB statistics
- Batting average: .196
- Home runs: 0
- Runs batted in: 2
- Stats at Baseball Reference

Teams
- Pittsburgh Pirates (1992–1994)

William Nathaniel Pennyfeather (born May 25, 1968) is a former professional baseball player. He played parts of three seasons in Major League Baseball as a center fielder for the Pittsburgh Pirates.

== Professional career ==
Pennyfeather accepted a scholarship to play college football at Syracuse. After his sophomore football season at Syracuse, Pennyfeather signed with the Pittsburgh Pirates in 1988 after a personal tryout and began his professional career with the Pirates' affiliate in the Gulf Coast League.

Listed at 6 ft 2 in (1.88 m) tall, weighing 195 pounds, and batting and throwing right-handed, Pennyfeather made his major league debut on June 27, 1992. During his major league career he appeared in 40 games over those three years and collected nine hits, including a double.

In 1994 he was claimed on waivers by the Cincinnati Reds, who traded him to the California Angels for Eduardo Pérez in 1996.

Pennyfeather continued to play professionally after the end of his major league career. He played for the minor league affiliates of the Anaheim Angels and Los Angeles Dodgers, as well as the Taipei Gida of the Taiwan Major League, the Broncos de Reynosa of the Mexican League, and teams in the independent Northern League and Atlantic League. He is one of only three players who played in the Atlantic League in each of its first ten seasons.

2006 was Pennyfeather's final season, during which he played for the Newark Bears of the Atlantic League. He went out on a high note, as he was honored as Newark Bears Player of the Year, and was also a member of the Atlantic League All-Star team. The Bears honored him with an in-game ceremony on September 21, 2006, during their final home game of the season.
