= John Hope (baseball) =

American baseball player (1970–2018)

- Pitcher
- Born: December 21, 1970; Fort Lauderdale, Florida, U.S.
- Died: April 18, 2018 (aged 47); Lauderhill, Florida, U.S.
- Batted: Right Threw: Right

MLB debut
- August 29, 1993, for the Pittsburgh Pirates

Last MLB appearance
- May 14, 1996, for the Pittsburgh Pirates

MLB statistics
- Win–loss record: 1–5
- Earned run average: 5.99
- Strikeouts: 29
- Stats at Baseball Reference

Teams
- Pittsburgh Pirates (1993–1996)

John Alan Hope (December 21, 1970 – April 18, 2018) was an American former professional baseball pitcher who played for the Pittsburgh Pirates of the Major League Baseball (MLB) from 1993 to 1996.
