= Joel Johnston =

American baseball player (born 1967)

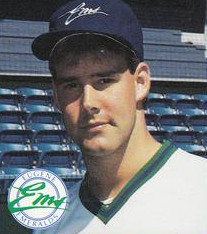
- Johnson in 1988
- Pitcher
- Born: March 8, 1967 (age 58); West Chester, Pennsylvania, U.S.
- Batted: Right Threw: Right

MLB debut
- September 5, 1991, for the Kansas City Royals

Last MLB appearance
- May 12, 1995, for the Boston Red Sox

MLB statistics
- Win–loss record: 3–5
- Earned run average: 4.31
- Strikeouts: 61
- Stats at Baseball Reference

Teams
- Kansas City Royals (1991–1992); Pittsburgh Pirates (1993–1994); Boston Red Sox (1995); Wei Chuan Dragons (1997)

Career highlights and awards
- Taiwan Series champion (1997)

Joel Raymond Johnston (born March 8, 1967) is a former Major League Baseball relief pitcher. He played five seasons for the Pittsburgh Pirates, Kansas City Royals and Boston Red Sox. He was 6 ft 5 in (1.96 m), 220 pounds, and he also threw and batted right-handed. Johnston attended Marple Newtown High School and Penn State University.

== Career ==
Johnston was drafted in the 3rd round of the 1988 amateur entry draft by the Royals. Less than 5 seasons later, on September 5, 1991, he made his major league debut at the age of 24. Perhaps his rookie season was his best season—in just over 22 innings, he gave up only one earned run for an ERA of 0.40. He also struck out 21 batters that year.

According to Baseball America, in 1992 Johnston was the Royals top prospect, and was also number 59 on Baseball America's 1992 Top 100 Prospects list.

After his promising rookie season, Johnston pitched in just 5 games in 1992, posting an ERA of 13.50. After the season Johnston was traded to the Pirates with pitcher Dennis Moeller for second baseman José Lind, and he rebounded to an ERA of 3.38 in 33 games. However, after brief trials producing poor ERAs of 29.70 (1994) and 11.25 (1995), Johnston pitched his final major league game on May 12, 1995.

In 1996, Johnston played in 18 games for the Tennessee Tomahawks of the Big South League, and in 1997 he played for the Wei Chuan Dragons of the Chinese Professional Baseball League, winning the Taiwan Series.

== Personal ==
Johnston currently resides in Downingtown, Pennsylvania.

== Sources ==
- Career statistics from Baseball Reference · Baseball Reference (Minors) · Retrosheet · Baseball Almanac
