= Jeff Ballard (baseball) =

American baseball player (born 1963)

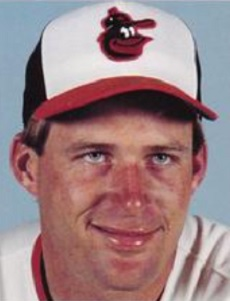
- Ballard with the Baltimore Orioles in 1988
- Pitcher
- Born: August 13, 1963 (age 63); Billings, Montana, U.S.
- Batted: Left Threw: Left

MLB debut
- May 9, 1987, for the Baltimore Orioles

Last MLB appearance
- July 8, 1994, for the Pittsburgh Pirates

MLB statistics
- Win–loss record: 41–53
- Earned run average: 4.71
- Strikeouts: 244
- Stats at Baseball Reference

Teams
- Baltimore Orioles (1987–1991); Pittsburgh Pirates (1993–1994)
Medals
Men's baseball
Representing United States
Baseball World Cup
Bronze medal – third place	1984 Cuba	Team
Pan American Games
Bronze medal – third place	1983 Caracas	Team

Jeffrey Scott Ballard (born August 13, 1963) is an American former professional baseball pitcher. He played in Major League Baseball (MLB) from 1987 to 1994 for the Baltimore Orioles and Pittsburgh Pirates.

== Playing career ==
Ballard played college baseball for Stanford University, and in 1984 played collegiate summer baseball with the Orleans Cardinals of the Cape Cod Baseball League. He earned a degree in geophysics from Stanford, and in 1998 was inducted into the Stanford Athletics Hall of Fame as one of Stanford's top pitchers, holding the all-time record in wins, strikeouts, and innings pitched for more than 20 years, as well as earning First Team All-Pac-10 twice.

In 1989, he finished in a tie with Dennis Eckersley and Gregg Olson for sixth place in American League Cy Young Award voting. In 1995, Ballard's car collided with a semi truck on a highway in Idaho, breaking his neck and several ribs. The accident ended his playing career.

In 2004, Orioles fans voted Ballard one of their 50 best loved Orioles.

== Personal life ==
Following his career, Ballard returned to his hometown of Billings, Montana. In January 1996, he began working for his father and with his brother at Ballard Petroleum Holdings.

Ballard married in 2008. He has two children.
