= Steve Cooke (baseball) =

American baseball player (born 1970)

- Pitcher
- Born: January 14, 1970 (age 55); Lihue, Hawaii, U.S.
- Batted: Right Threw: Left

MLB debut
- July 28, 1992, for the Pittsburgh Pirates

Last MLB appearance
- April 2, 1998, for the Cincinnati Reds

MLB statistics
- Win–loss record: 26–36
- Earned run average: 4.31
- Strikeouts: 335

Teams
- Pittsburgh Pirates (1992–1994, 1996–1997); Cincinnati Reds (1998)

Steven Montague Cooke III (born January 14, 1970) is a former professional baseball player who pitched in the Major Leagues from 1992 to 1994 and 1996–1998. He was named as the LHP in the Topps All-Star Rookie Team in 1993. On the final day of the 1992 regular season, Cookie picked up his only MLB save. He pitched 1 1/3 scoreless innings to preserve a 2–0 victory over the Mets. He saved the game for starting pitcher Tim Wakefield.

== Life ==
He graduated from Tigard High School in Tigard, Oregon, and attended the College of Southern Idaho. His ancestors include Joseph Platt Cooke (1730–1816), Amos Starr Cooke (1810–1871), Gerrit P. Judd (1803–1873) and Albert Francis Judd (1838–1900). Baseball pioneer Alexander Cartwright was fire chief in Honolulu in the late 19th century and organized school baseball games at Punahou School where many of his ancestors attended.
