= Gary Varsho =

American baseball player and manager (born 1961)

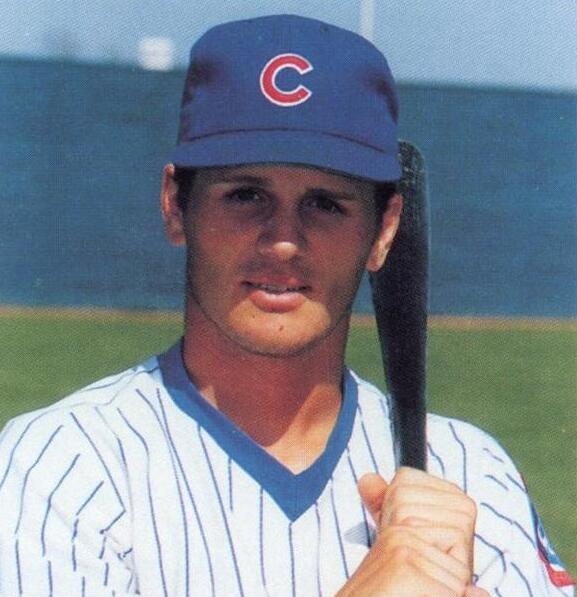
- Varsho c. 1987
- Outfielder
- Born: June 20, 1961 (age 65); Marshfield, Wisconsin, U.S.
- Batted: Left Threw: Right

MLB debut
- July 6, 1988, for the Chicago Cubs

Last MLB appearance
- October 1, 1995, for the Philadelphia Phillies

MLB statistics
- Batting average: .244
- Home runs: 10
- Runs batted in: 84
- Stats at Baseball Reference
- Managerial record at Baseball Reference

Teams
- As player: Chicago Cubs (1988–1990); Pittsburgh Pirates (1991–1992); Cincinnati Reds (1993); Pittsburgh Pirates (1994); Philadelphia Phillies (1995); As manager: Philadelphia Phillies (2004); As coach: Philadelphia Phillies (2002–2006); Pittsburgh Pirates (2008–2010)

Gary Andrew Varsho (born June 20, 1961) is an American former professional baseball outfielder, manager, and coach, who played in Major League Baseball (MLB) for the Chicago Cubs, Pittsburgh Pirates, Cincinnati Reds, and Philadelphia Phillies.

== Baseball career ==
=== As player ===
Varsho was selected by the Chicago Cubs in the fifth round (107th overall) of the 1982 June draft as a second baseman and made his MLB debut with the Cubs on July 9, 1988. His first major league hit came off Ed Whitson on July 9, 1988, against the San Diego Padres. After being traded to the Pirates, Varsho connected off the Cubs’ Shawn Boskie for his first big league home run on July 2, 1992, at Wrigley Field.

Varsho appeared for the Pirates in the 1991 and 1992 National League Championship Series; in three postseason games (all as a pinch hitter), he singled twice in three at bats, and spent one defensive inning in right field.

Primarily an outfielder, Varsho played 14 years of pro baseball, including eight seasons in the major leagues (1988–1995).

=== After playing ===
Varsho was the Phillies bench coach (2002–2006) and was interim manager for the last two games of the 2004 season, after Larry Bowa was fired. Varsho was fired as the Pirates’ bench coach on August 8, 2010. In 2012, he became a professional scout for the Los Angeles Angels. Since 2016, Varsho has served in the same capacity for the Pirates.

== Personal life ==
In 1979, Varsho graduated from Marshfield High School in Marshfield, Wisconsin, after which he attended University of Wisconsin-Oshkosh, where he received a bachelor's degree in physical education in 1989.

Varsho and his wife, Kay, have three children: daughter Andie, born 1991; daughter Taylor Varsho-Krueger, born 1994; and son Daulton, born 1996, who is a professional baseball outfielder for the Houston Astros.

Preceded by Jim Lett	Pittsburgh Pirates Bench Coach; 2008 - 2010	Succeeded by Jeff Banister
