= Pittsburgh Associates =

Pittsburgh Associates was a consortium of the City of Pittsburgh and local businesses which owned the Pittsburgh Pirates from 1986 to 1996. It was spearheaded during a dark year for the ball club with national media focused on the Pittsburgh drug trials, where many former Pirates as well as other major leaguers were brought up on Federal drug charges for offenses through the early 1980s. The Pirates had gone from a World Series victory in 1979 and contention as late as 1983, to a 100-loss season in 1985. At the same time, longtime owner John W. Galbreath was looking for a new buyer, and regions such as New Orleans, Denver, Tampa, New Jersey, Indianapolis and Portland were making attractive bids.

The Associates were spearheaded by popular Pittsburgh Mayor Richard S. Caliguiri and some prominent corporate leaders of such companies as Westinghouse, Alcoa, PPG, United States Steel, PNC, Mellon Financial, Carnegie Mellon University and Ryan Homes. Other investors include Chicago real estate developer Harvey Walken, Pittsburgh contractor Frank Schneider and Pittsburgh businessman Frank Fuhrer as well as Block Communications co-owner and Pittsburgh Post-Gazette publisher William Block. The deal was intended to ensure that the Pirates would stay in Pittsburgh until a new long-term buyer could be found to keep the club in the city. However, the consortium's stewardship of the Pirates would last for 10 years until Kevin McClatchy bought the team in 1996.

During their time as owners, Pittsburgh Associates saw the Pirates win three straight NL East titles (1990–92); however, the Pirates would fall in the NLCS all three times.

Preceded by John Galbreath / Warner Communications	Owner of the Pittsburgh Pirates; 1986-1996	Succeeded by Kevin McClatchy
