= Paul Wagner =

American baseball player (born 1967)

Lake Country DockHounds
- Pitcher / Coach
- Born: November 14, 1967 (age 58); Milwaukee, Wisconsin, U.S.
- Batted: Right Threw: Right

MLB debut
- July 26, 1992, for the Pittsburgh Pirates

Last MLB appearance
- May 7, 1999, for the Cleveland Indians

MLB statistics
- Win–loss record: 29–45
- Earned run average: 4.83
- Strikeouts: 452
- Stats at Baseball Reference

Teams
- Pittsburgh Pirates (1992–1997); Milwaukee Brewers (1997–1998); Cleveland Indians (1999)

Paul Alan Wagner (born November 14, 1967) is an American professional baseball coach and former pitcher who is currently the pitching coach for the Lake Country DockHounds of the American Association of Professional Baseball. He played in Major League Baseball (MLB) for the Pittsburgh Pirates (1992–1997), Milwaukee Brewers (1997–1998), and Cleveland Indians (1999).

== Amateur career ==
Wagner attended Illinois State University in Normal, Illinois. In 1987 he led the team with an ERA of 2.40, and was named to the All-MVC second team. Wagner is the most recent Illinois State pitcher to throw a no-hitter, which he accomplished in a 9–0 victory over Chicago State in 1987. In 1989, he led the team in wins with 8, and broke the school record for most games started in a single season with 16 (a record which would stand until 2010.) Wagner was named to the All-MVC first team for 1989.

== Professional career ==
Wagner was drafted from Illinois State University by the Pittsburgh Pirates in the 12th round of the 1989 Major League Baseball draft.

On August 29, 1995, while with the Pirates, Wagner had a no-hitter broken up against the Colorado Rockies with two out in the ninth on an Andrés Galarraga single. It was the only hit Wagner would allow in defeating the Rockies 4–0. The no-hitter would have been the first by a Pirate since John Candelaria in 1976. Wagner finished his 8-year career with a 4.83 ERA. He pitched in 598.2 innings, allowing 640 hits and 321 earned runs. In 160 appearances including 84 starts, Wagner handled 137 total chances (50 putouts, 87 assists) without an error for a perfect 1.000 fielding percentage.

On August 10, 2021, Wagner was announced as the pitching coach for the Lake Country DockHounds, for their inaugural season in the American Association of Professional Baseball.

Wagner lives in Neosho, Wisconsin.
