= Randy Tomlin =

American baseball player (born 1966)

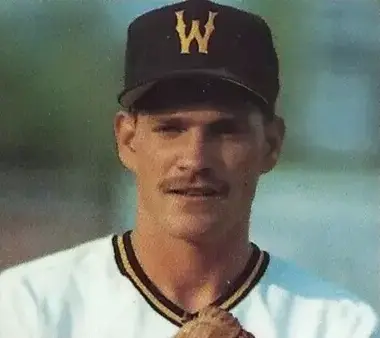
- Tomlin with the Watertown Pirates c. 1988
- Pitcher
- Born: June 14, 1966 (age 60); Bainbridge, Maryland, U.S.
- Batted: Left Threw: Left

MLB debut
- August 6, 1990, for the Pittsburgh Pirates

Last MLB appearance
- May 20, 1994, for the Pittsburgh Pirates

MLB statistics
- Win–loss record: 30–31
- Earned run average: 3.43
- Strikeouts: 297
- Stats at Baseball Reference

Teams
- Pittsburgh Pirates (1990–1994)

Randy Leon Tomlin (born June 14, 1966) is a former left-handed starting pitcher for the Pittsburgh Pirates (1990–94). He stands 5'11" and weighs 170 pounds. In five seasons, he had a 3.43 earned run average (ERA).

Tomlin grew up around Lynchburg, Virginia, and attended Liberty University. Selected by the Pirates in the 18th round of the 1988 Major League Baseball (MLB) Draft, he reached the major leagues in 1990. In 1991, he finished eighth in the National League (NL) in ERA (2.98) and held the Atlanta Braves to two runs over six innings in Game 4 of the NL Championship Series, earning a no decision in a 3–2 victory. The next year, he was tied for the NL lead in wins through June 22 and finished the year with the 10th-best winning percentage in the NL. Injuries limited him to 18 starts in 1993, and he had elbow surgery after the season. He only appeared in 10 games for Pittsburgh in 1994 and did not pitch at all in 1995. After two seasons in minor/independent league baseball, he became the pitching coach for Liberty University. After serving in that capacity through 2006, he served as a minor league pitching coach for the Washington Nationals for a few seasons.

== Early life ==
Though born in Bainbridge, Maryland, Tomlin lived there less than a year before moving to Virginia, first to Farmville, then to the Lynchburg area when he was aged four or five. He attended Amherst County High School, where he played baseball and football. Tomlin hoped to attend James Madison University, but their scouts were not impressed with him. Liberty University offered him a full scholarship, so he chose to attend there instead.

== College career ==
Tomlin had played as a pitcher and outfielder in high school, but he focused on pitching upon joining the Liberty Flames in 1986. During his time with the Flames, he threw 22 complete games and four shutouts, both records as of 2016. Three of those shutouts came in 1986, a year in which Tomlin also pitched all 11 innings of a 4–3 victory over Slippery Rock University. He pitched 273 innings for the Flames, striking out 211 hitters. After Tomlin's junior year, he was drafted by the Pirates in the 18th round (460th overall) of the 1988 Major League Baseball (MLB) Draft. In 2016, he was inducted into the Liberty Sports Hall of Fame.

== Minor leagues ==
After being drafted, Tomlin began his professional career in 1988 with the Watertown Pirates of the Single-A (short season) New York-Penn League. In 15 starts, he had a 7–5 record, a 2.18 earned run average (ERA), 87 strikeouts, 25 walks, and 75 hits allowed in 103 1/3 innings pitched.

Tomlin spent most of 1989 with the Salem Buccaneers of the Single-A Carolina League, where he had a 12–6 record, a 3.25 ERA, 99 strikeouts, 43 walks, and 131 hits allowed in 138 2/3 innings pitched. The 12 wins were tied with two others for fourth in the league. Tomlin also made five starts for the Harrisburg Senators of the Double-A Eastern League that year; though his record was just 2–2, his ERA was 0.84.

For 1990, Tomlin spent much of the year with Harrisburg. In 19 games (18 starts), he had a 9–6 record, a 2.28 ERA, 92 strikeouts, 34 walks, and 101 hits allowed in 126 1/3 innings pitched. He also appeared in three games (one start) with the Triple-A Buffalo Bisons of the American Association.

== Pittsburgh Pirates (1990-94) ==
=== 1990 ===
In August 1990, Tomlin was recalled to replace Rick Reed in Pittsburgh's starting rotation. He made his major league debut in the first game of a doubleheader on August 6, allowing just five hits and one run in a complete game, 10–1 victory over the Philadelphia Phillies. On September 6, he held the New York Mets to three hits in a complete game, 7–1 victory. In 12 starts with Pittsburgh, he had a 4–4 record, a 2.55 ERA, 42 strikeouts, 12 walks, and 62 hits allowed in 77 2/3 innings pitched. The Pirates won the National League (NL) East Division and faced the Cincinnati Reds in the NL Championship Series (NLCS), but Tomlin made no appearances in the series as Cincinnati defeated Pittsburgh four games to two.

=== 1991 ===
The 1991 campaign was Tomlin's first full season as a starter in the major leagues. On July 15 and 21, he pitched back-to-back shutouts against the Houston Astros and the Reds. For his performance, Tomlin was named the NL Player of the Week for the week of July 15–21. On August 6, he limited the Mets to four hits and one run in a complete game, 3–1 victory. At that point, Tomlin had an 8–4 record with a 2.35 ERA, but he went winless for the rest of the season, posting a 4.31 ERA. In the first game of a doubleheader against the Mets on September 26, he had a shutout going until the ninth, in which he gave up two runs, allowing New York to tie the game. However, Pittsburgh still won in 15 innings, 4–3. In 31 games (27 starts), Tomlin had an 8–7 record, 104 strikeouts, 54 walks, and 170 hits allowed in 175 innings. His 2.98 ERA ranked eighth in the league, and the Pirates won the NL East for the second year in a row. Jay LeBlanc of The Washington Times wrote that Tomlin is "best remembered for his clutch performance in Game 4 of the 1991 NLCS." With the Pirates down two games to one in the series, Tomlin held the Atlanta Braves to two runs over six innings in Game 4. He got a no decision, but Pittsburgh won the game 3–2 in 10 innings before ultimately losing the series in seven games.

=== 1992 ===
Tomlin won his first four starts of the 1992 season; Sports Illustrated wrote in May that he and the other Pittsburgh starting pitchers "(were) racking up W's like unlucky Scrabble competitors." After losing three decisions in a row, he then won his next six decisions, including five starts in a row from June 2 through June 22. During the streak, Tomlin threw 26 consecutive scoreless innings, which included a complete-game shutout of the Mets on June 7. He was named the NL Player of the Month for June. Through the 22nd of the month, Tomlin was tied with four others for most wins in the major leagues. His ERA was 3.03 at that point, and it would be 3.69 for the rest of the year, but Tomlin would win just four more games. He pitched back-to-back one-run, eight-inning games against the St. Louis Cardinals on August 2 and 7, earning the win in the second of those (the Pirates won both). In 33 starts, Tomlin had a 14–9 record, a 3.41 ERA, 90 strikeouts, and 42 walks in 208 2/3 innings pitched. Tomlin finished 10th in the NL with a .609 winning percentage and fifth in the NL in walks per nine innings pitched, though he was also third with 226 hits allowed (behind Andy Benes's 230 and Terry Mulholland's 227). NL East Champions again, the Pirates faced the Braves in the NLCS for the second year in a row. In Game 2, Tomlin pitched 1 1/3 scoreless innings of relief, though the Pirates were already losing 8–0 and would lose 13–5. He relieved Doug Drabek in Game 4 with the game tied 3-3, runners on first and third, and one out in the fifth inning. After an error allowed a run to score, Tomlin induced Ron Gant to hit into an inning-ending double play, but would allow two runs in the next inning as Pittsburgh went on to lose 6–4. The Pirates lost the series in seven games.

=== 1993 ===
In 1993, Tomlin won only two of his first five decisions, posting a 4.44 ERA through the end of May. He did not pitch in June, as he was on the disabled list with an elbow injury. On July 21, Tomlin held the Astros to four hits and one run in a complete game, 2–1 victory. However, he would win just one more game all season. On August 27, Tomlin went back on the disabled list, not pitching for Pittsburgh again all season. In 18 starts, he had a 4–8 record, a 4.85 ERA, 44 strikeouts, 15 walks, and 109 hits allowed in 98 1/3 innings pitched.

=== 1994 ===
After the 1993 season, Tomlin underwent elbow surgery. He had not completely recovered from it by the beginning of the 1994 season, but still began the year as a starter for the Pirates. On April 23, Tomlin held the Braves to one runs over five innings and struck out six; though he did not get a decision, the Pirates won 6–1. After his start on May 10, he was moved to the bullpen in favor of prospect Jon Lieber. On May 20, Tomlin entered a game against the Montreal Expos with nobody out in the eighth inning, runners on first and second, and the Pirates leading 3–2. He gave up back-to-back hits to Larry Walker and Moisés Alou and left with Pittsburgh trailing 5–3, which would be the final score. After that, Tomlin was sent to Buffalo, where he posted a 2–2 record and a 5.30 ERA in 11 starts. He was recalled by the Pirates later in the year but did not make an appearance, as the 1994 Major League Baseball strike had already begun. In 10 games (four starts) for Pittsburgh, Tomlin had an 0–3 record, a 3.92 ERA, 17 strikeouts, 10 walks, and 23 hits in 20 2/3 innings pitched. After the season, the Pirates chose not to re-sign him, making him a free agent.

== Back to the minor leagues ==
Tomlin did not pitch in 1995. On January 17, 1996, Tomlin signed a minor league contract with the Boston Red Sox that included an invitation to spring training. He failed to make the team and pitched for the Triple-A Pawtucket Red Sox of the International League, losing two games and posting an 8.31 ERA in five games (two starts). Tomlin also made six relief appearances for the Nashua Hawks of the independent North Atlantic League; though his record was 0–1, his ERA was 1.42. In 1997, he made 16 appearances (15 starts) for the Duluth-Superior Dukes of the independent Northern League, posting a 3–10 record, a 6.31 ERA, 59 strikeouts, 29 walks, and 107 hits allowed in 77 innings. The 10 losses tied for the league lead with Steve Renko Jr.

== Career statistics, pitching style ==
During his major league career, Tomlin had a 30–31 record in 94 career starts with 297 strikeouts. He posted a 3.43 ERA, allowing 590 hits and walking 133 in 580 1/3 innings. The Associated Press called him "the ultimate Met killer" because of his success against that team; he won all nine of his decisions against New York.

Tomlin was not a power pitcher, relying on full use of the strike zone to get batters out. Tomlin was known for throwing the Vulcan changeup. In a 2008 interview with The Washington Times, he described his pitching style: "I mainly tried to get ground balls. I threw a fastball that moved a lot and I had a big curveball and a sweeper - more of a slider - and a change-up. I mixed my pitches. I didn't throw overly hard; when I tried to throw hard my ball straightened out, so I had to throw strikes and change speeds. That's the name of the game - throwing the ball over the plate and changing speeds - that's how you get guys out ... if you're not blessed with being able to throw 95."

== Coaching career ==
After his season with Duluth-Superior, Tomlin became the pitching coach at Liberty University from 1997 through 2006. Then, he served as a minor league pitching coach in the Washington Nationals system, first for the Single-A Potomac Nationals (2007–08) and then for Double-A Harrisburg (2009–11). After the 2011 season, he became the head coach at Liberty Christian Academy in Lynchburg, Virginia, a position that enabled him to spend more time with his family. In March 2024, Tomlin was named coach of the Charlottesville Tom Sox, a member of the collegiate summer baseball Valley League.

== Personal life ==
While Tomlin was pitching for Watertown, he met Janet Belch, whom he would marry in 1990. They have three children: son Coy, daughter Ellison, and son Quade. In 2020, Quade was signed by the Nationals as an undrafted free agent. Though raised attending a Presbyterian church, Tomlin became a born-again Christian while attending Liberty University.
