= Kevin Young (baseball) =

American baseball player (born 1969)

- First baseman
- Born: June 16, 1969 (age 56); Alpena, Michigan, U.S.
- Batted: Right Threw: Right

MLB debut
- July 12, 1992, for the Pittsburgh Pirates

Last MLB appearance
- June 27, 2003, for the Pittsburgh Pirates

MLB statistics
- Batting average: .258
- Home runs: 144
- Runs batted in: 606
- Stats at Baseball Reference

Teams
- Pittsburgh Pirates (1992–1995); Kansas City Royals (1996); Pittsburgh Pirates (1997–2003)

Kevin Stacey Young (born June 16, 1969) is an American former professional baseball player. He played 12 seasons in Major League Baseball (MLB) for the Pittsburgh Pirates (1992–95, 1997–2003) and Kansas City Royals (1996), primarily as a first baseman. He batted and threw right-handed.

Young was also the recipient of the Roberto Clemente Award in Pittsburgh. This award is given annually to the MLB player who best exemplifies sportsmanship, community involvement and the individual's contribution to his team.

== Amateur career ==
When Young was 17 years old, he played on a Kansas City Kansas American Legion team that finished 24th in the nation out of 5,000 teams. Young attended Kansas City Kansas Community College, where he was an All-American and the recipient of the Rawlings Big Stick Award while leading the five state region with a .477 batting average. He attended the University of Southern Mississippi where he was an All-American and led the Golden Eagles to its first Regional tournament in 1990.

== Professional career ==
Young was drafted by the Pirates in the 7th round of the 1990 MLB draft. He quickly moved his way through their minor league system, debuting in the MLB a little over two years later. In a 12-season career, Young posted a .258 batting average with 144 home runs and 606 RBI in 1205 games played.

In 1999 Young became only the third first baseman in the history of the game to have more than 25 home runs, 40 doubles, 20 stolen bases, 100 runs scored, and 100 RBI in a single season. At the time of his retirement in 2003, 11 seasons into their streak of 20 consecutive losing seasons which lasted from 1993 to 2012, he was the last remaining player to leave the Pittsburgh Pirates who had played on a winning team with the club (their last winning season before the streak was in 1992, which was his rookie year).

Originally selected by the Pittsburgh Pirates in the seventh round of the 1990 MLB draft and spent 11 MLB seasons playing for the Pirates. He also played for his hometown Kansas City Royals in 1996 for a total of 12 seasons.

After being named Pittsburgh's Minor League Player-of-the-Year in 1991 and the American Associations top prospect in 1992, Young made his Major League debut with the Pirates on July 12, 1992 and singled off Cincinnati's Tim Belcher in his second big league at bat.

Young spent his first full season in the majors with the Pirates in 1993 and established a club record with a .998 fielding percentage at first base (three errors in 1,220 total chances), breaking Willie Stargell's previous mark of .997 set in 1979. He also connected off San Francisco's Rod Beck for his first big league home run on April 9, 1993 at Three Rivers Stadium.

In his 11 seasons with the Pirates (1992–1995 and 1997–2003), Young played a total of 1,022 games at first base and ranks third on the club's all-time list for games played at that position, trailing Gus Suhr (1,339) and Jake Beckley (1,045). Young spent the 1996 campaign in the Kansas City Royals organization before returning to the Pirates for the 1997 season. He set career highs in batting average (.300) in 1997 and in games (159), home runs (27) and RBI (108) the following year. In 1998, he became the second of only three Pirates player to have at least 20 stolen bases 40 doubles, 25 home runs 100 runs scored and 100 RBI in a single season since Dave Parker in 1978. Jason Bay also reached the feat in 2005

Young played a total of 12 seasons in the Major Leagues, appearing in his final game with the Pirates on June 27, 2003. He produced a .258 career average, going 1,007-for-3,897 with 235 doubles, 17 triples, 144 home runs and 606 RBI in 1,205 games. Primarily as first baseman, he also made 97 career appearances at third base where he shares the NL record for most assist in a single game (11) with Cincinnati Reds Chris Sabo. Also played 18 games in right field and 13 in left field during his Major League career.

Young finished his career with 65 home runs hit at historic Three Rivers Stadium, which ranks fourth on the all-time list behind Willie Stargell (147), Barry Bonds (89) and Dave Parker (88). And only Stargell (184) hit more home runs as a first baseman than Young did (128) in a Pirates uniform. In 1997 Young was the recipient of the Roberto Clemente Award for his contributions from within the Pittsburgh community.

== See also ==
- List of Major League Baseball players named in the Mitchell Report
