= Mark Dewey =

American baseball player (born 1964)

- Pitcher
- Born: January 3, 1965 (age 61); Grand Rapids, Michigan, U.S.
- Batted: Right Threw: Right

MLB debut
- August 24, 1990, for the San Francisco Giants

Last MLB appearance
- September 29, 1996, for the San Francisco Giants

MLB statistics
- Win–loss record: 12–7
- Earned run average: 3.65
- Strikeouts: 168
- Stats at Baseball Reference

Teams
- San Francisco Giants (1990); New York Mets (1992); Pittsburgh Pirates (1993–1994); San Francisco Giants (1995–1996)

Mark Alan Dewey (born January 3, 1965) is an American former Major League Baseball player.

He was a 6'0" right-handed relief pitcher who played six seasons in the major leagues with the San Francisco Giants (1990, 1995–96), New York Mets (1992), and Pittsburgh Pirates (1993–94).Born in Grand Rapids, Dewey played for the Grand Valley State University Lakers. In 1987, he struck out 87 batters in 97.2 innings. On June 2, 1987, Dewey was drafted by the Giants in the 23rd round of the 1987 amateur draft. He appeared in 205 major league games and had a lifetime record of 12–7 (.632 winning percentage) with 168 strikeouts, 70 games finished and 8 saves. His lifetime earned run average was 3.65 for an Adjusted ERA+ of 110. His best season was 1993 when he had 7 saves for the Pirates in 21 games and maintained an impressive 2.36 ERA for an Adjusted ERA+ of 171. In his final season, Dewey appeared in 78 games for the Giants—3rd most in the National League. Dewey earned $225,000 in his final season in the big leagues. In 1995, Dewey was inducted into the Grand Valley State University Athletic Hall of Fame.

Dewey was involved in a notable controversy on July 28, 1996, when he refused to participate with his teammates in a pregame ceremony intended to support research for a cure for AIDS. As part of "Until There's A Cure Day", members of the Giants wore AIDS awareness ribbons on their uniforms and stood in a group shaped like that symbol during speeches by Giants owner Peter Magowan and San Francisco Mayor Willie Brown. Dewey refused to take the field for the ceremony, and he wore his ribbon sideways (which would have resembled the Icthys, a popular symbol meant to represent Jesus in Christian culture). He cited religious reasons for his refusal, stating that the ceremony was "against [his] Christian principles" and voicing the belief that homosexuality is a sin.
