= Spin Williams =

American professional baseball coach (born 1956)

Donald Ray "Spin" Williams, Jr. (born January 5, 1956, in Davenport, Iowa) is an American professional baseball coach. As of the 2015 season, he is senior advisor for player development for the Washington Nationals of Major League Baseball.

Prior to joining Washington in 2006, Williams spent 27 years with the Pittsburgh Pirates — initially as a minor league pitcher (1979–1981) and pitching instructor and manager (1981–1993), and then as a member of the Pirates' Major League coaching staff for 12 consecutive seasons, serving as bullpen (1994–2000) and pitching coach (2001–2005).

A left-handed pitcher who stood 6 ft 3 in (1.91 m) tall and weighed 210 lb (95 kg) during his playing career, Williams attended Winona State University before signing with Pittsburgh. He compiled a won–lost mark of 7–9 with an earned run average of 3.67 in 38 minor-league games, progressing as high as the Double-A level. He then became a coach with Pirate farm teams, and spent part of the 1993 season as manager of the Double-A Carolina Mudcats of the Southern League. He was promoted to the staff of Pirate manager Jim Leyland in 1994 when Pittsburgh bullpen coach Terry Collins departed to become skipper of the Houston Astros. During his dozen years with the Pirates, Williams also worked for Gene Lamont, Lloyd McClendon and Pete Mackanin.

When the Pirates turned over their coaching staff after the 2005 season, Williams was released; he joined the Nationals as a player development advisor the following spring. He was minor league pitching coordinator for the Nationals through 2014.

Preceded by Pete Vuckovich	Pittsburgh Pirates pitching coach 2001–2005	Succeeded by Jim Colborn
