= Bob Walk =

American baseball player (born 1956)

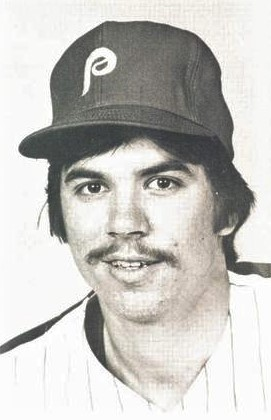
- Walk with the Philadelphia Phillies in 1980
- Pitcher
- Born: November 26, 1956 (age 69); Van Nuys, California, U.S.
- Batted: Right Threw: Right

MLB debut
- May 26, 1980, for the Philadelphia Phillies

Last MLB appearance
- September 29, 1993, for the Pittsburgh Pirates

MLB statistics
- Win–loss record: 105–81
- Earned run average: 4.03
- Strikeouts: 848
- Stats at Baseball Reference

Teams
- Philadelphia Phillies (1980); Atlanta Braves (1981–1983); Pittsburgh Pirates (1984–1993)

Career highlights and awards
- All-Star (1988); World Series champion (1980)

Robert Vernon Walk (born November 26, 1956), nicknamed "The Whirly Bird", is an American former professional baseball pitcher who played in Major League Baseball (MLB) for the Philadelphia Phillies (1980), Atlanta Braves (1981–1983), and Pittsburgh Pirates (1984–1993). Since then, he has been a Pirates broadcaster.

In his major league career, Walk compiled a 105-81 record and 4.03 earned run average in 350 appearances, 259 of them as a starter.

== Early life ==
Born in Van Nuys, California, Walk was born and raised in Newhall, California. He attended Placerita Canyon junior high, and Hart High School.

When Walk was a teenager, he threw a tennis ball from the stands at Houston Astros centerfielder César Cedeño in a game at Dodger Stadium in Los Angeles. The youth was charged with battery but ultimately released after he promised not to frequent the premises again.

Walk attended College of the Canyons in Santa Clarita, California. He was drafted by the Phillies in the third round of the 1976 amateur draft.

== Philadelphia Phillies ==
Known for his deliberate pace and extended pitch counts, Walk outlasted opponents more than he overpowered them. In his major league debut, the rookie won his first six decisions for the National League champions Phillies en route to an 11–7 record. Even though Walk allowed three home runs in the contest, he received credit for a 7-6 victory against the Kansas City Royals in Game One of the 1980 World Series. It was his only appearance in the Fall Classic, which saw the Phillies prevail in six games.

== Atlanta Braves ==
Walk was traded from the Phillies to the Braves for Gary Matthews on March 25, 1981. The journeyman pitcher bounced between the parent club and Triple-A Richmond until his release in March, 1984. In two-plus seasons in a Braves uniform, Walk recorded a 12-13 record and 4.85 ERA in 45 games.

== Pittsburgh Pirates ==
In 1985, Walk experienced a rebirth of sorts after the Pirates signed him to a minor league contract. While with the Hawaii Islanders, he led the Pacific Coast League (PCL) in wins (16) and earned run average (ERA) (2.65), a performance that merited a return trip to the majors. Walk was named to the NL All-Star team three years later, when he won 12 games and posted a 2.71 ERA in what would be his career year.

Walk spent his final five seasons as a spot starter and swingman for Pirates teams that won three straight NL East titles from 1990–1992. His most memorable outing came against the Braves the 1992 NLCS, when manager Jim Leyland named him a surprise starter in Game 5. Walk responded with a complete game three-hitter in a 7-1 win against his former team that allowed the Pirates to stave off elimination. They also won Game 6 by a 13-4 score to take the series to the limit.

In the decisive seventh game, Walk was warming up in the bullpen when Francisco Cabrera hit the two-run, game-winning single off Stan Belinda that won the series. Leyland opted to stay with Belinda, also a right-hander, even though he had walked Damon Berryhill to load the bases and allowed a deep fly ball to Ron Gant to set up the dramatic finish.

In 1993, Walk recorded an NL-worst 5.68 ERA and retired after the season.

== Post-career ==
Walk provides analysis for Pirates games on AT&T SportsNet Pittsburgh and radio. He also serves as a fill-in for MLB on FOX as well as a analyst for Peacock’s MLB Sunday Leadoff on Pirates broadcasts.

== Personal ==
Walk is the father of three children.
