= Zane Smith (baseball) =

American baseball player (born 1960)

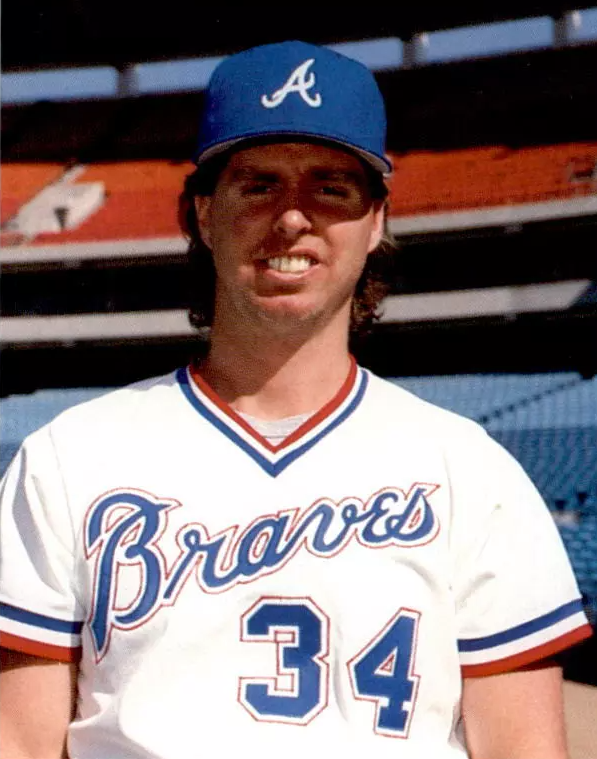
- Smith with the Atlanta Braves c. 1986
- Pitcher
- Born: December 28, 1960 (age 65); Madison, Wisconsin, U.S.
- Batted: Left Threw: Left

MLB debut
- September 10, 1984, for the Atlanta Braves

Last MLB appearance
- July 5, 1996, for the Pittsburgh Pirates

MLB statistics
- Win–loss record: 100–115
- Earned run average: 3.74
- Strikeouts: 1,011
- Stats at Baseball Reference

Teams
- Atlanta Braves (1984–1989); Montreal Expos (1989–1990); Pittsburgh Pirates (1990–1994); Boston Red Sox (1995); Pittsburgh Pirates (1996)

Zane William Smith (born December 28, 1960) is an American former professional baseball pitcher.

== Career ==
Smith, a left-handed pitcher, played collegiately at Indiana State University. He was drafted by the Atlanta Braves in the 3rd round of the 1982 amateur draft and made his Major League debut on September 10, 1984, for Atlanta. His first successful season was 1987 with the Braves, when he led the team with 15 wins, nearly twice as many as any other Braves pitcher on a team with only 69 wins. He was among the league leaders in wins (tied 5th), innings pitched (5th), games started (tied 1st), complete games (4th) and shutouts (tied 3rd).

Smith was traded from Atlanta to the Montreal Expos on July 2, 1989, for Sergio Valdez, Nate Minchey and minor leaguer Kevin Dean. Just over a year later, on August 8, 1990, Smith was traded to the Pittsburgh Pirates for Scott Ruskin, Willie Greene and Moisés Alou. The trade allowed the Pirates to hold off the New York Mets down the stretch and win the National League Eastern Division pennant. Smith contributed by winning 6 games, 3 of them complete games, 2 of those shutouts, while losing only 2, and compiling a 1.30 ERA. It was during this season that Smith had his best performance, a 1 hit complete-game shutout of the Mets in the first game of a doubleheader sweep that gave the Pirates a 2.5 game lead over the Mets.

Smith played with the Pirates through the 1994 season before signing as a free agent with the Boston Red Sox on April 18, 1995, shortly before the start of a season whose start was delayed by a lockout. Smith did not have much success during the 1995 season for Boston, compiling a 5.61 ERA and an 8–8 record in 24 starts. The next offseason, he returned to the Pirates for a salary that was significantly reduced from the $3.125 million he earned in 1994. Smith pitched his final career game for the Pirates on July 5, 1996; he would be released by the Pirates the following day.

== Highlights ==
On May 1, 1986, Smith struck out 12 Mets to end New York's club-record-tying 11 game win-streak.

On April 17, 1988, Smith got Atlanta's first victory of the season, ending a 10-game season-opening losing streak that set an MLB record.

On June 7, 1996, Smith recorded the 100th and final win of his career, a complete-game shutout at San Diego.

== Personal life ==
Smith has three daughters and lives near Atlanta.

Zane enjoys listening to hard-rock music.
