= Orlando Merced =

Puerto Rican baseball player (born 1966)

- Right fielder / First baseman
- Born: November 2, 1966 (age 59); Hato Rey, Puerto Rico
- Batted: Switch Threw: Right

Professional debut
- MLB: June 27, 1990, for the Pittsburgh Pirates
- NPB: June 3, 2000, for the Orix BlueWave

Last appearance
- NPB: July 30, 2000, for the Orix BlueWave
- MLB: October 1, 2003, for the Houston Astros

MLB statistics
- Batting average: .277
- Home runs: 103
- Runs batted in: 585

NPB statistics
- Batting average: .225
- Home runs: 2
- Runs batted in: 15
- Stats at Baseball Reference

Teams
- Pittsburgh Pirates (1990–1996); Toronto Blue Jays (1997); Minnesota Twins (1998); Boston Red Sox (1998); Chicago Cubs (1998); Montreal Expos (1999); Orix BlueWave (2000); Houston Astros (2001–2003)

Orlando Luis Merced Villanueva (born November 2, 1966) is a Puerto Rican former Major League Baseball first baseman and outfielder. He played all or parts of 13 seasons in the majors for the Pittsburgh Pirates (1990–1996), Toronto Blue Jays (1997), Minnesota Twins (1998), Boston Red Sox (1998), Chicago Cubs (1998), Montreal Expos (1999), and Houston Astros (2001–2003). He also played one season for the Orix BlueWave (2000) in Japan.

== Career ==
Merced was signed as an amateur free agent out of high school at the age of 17 by the Pittsburgh Pirates in 1985. Six years later, he made his major league debut. He played for the Pirates for another six years, where he helped the Pirates win the National League East Division in three consecutive seasons, from 1990 through 1992. He was part of the Astros' 2001 NL Central Division champions.

He finished second in voting for 1991 National League Rookie of the Year, behind Jeff Bagwell.

In thirteen seasons, he played in 1,391 games.
