= Mike LaValliere =

American baseball player (born 1960)

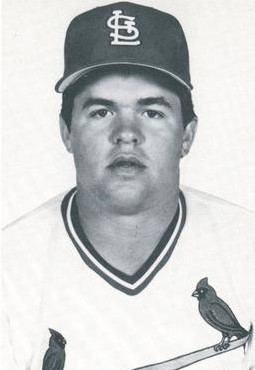
- LaValliere in 1986
- Catcher
- Born: August 18, 1960 (age 66); Charlotte, North Carolina, U.S.
- Batted: Left Threw: Right

MLB debut
- September 9, 1984, for the Philadelphia Phillies

Last MLB appearance
- September 22, 1995, for the Chicago White Sox

MLB statistics
- Batting average: .268
- Home runs: 18
- Runs batted in: 294
- Stats at Baseball Reference

Teams
- Philadelphia Phillies (1984); St. Louis Cardinals (1985–1986); Pittsburgh Pirates (1987–1993); Chicago White Sox (1993–1995)

Career highlights and awards
- Gold Glove Award (1987)

Michael Eugene LaValliere (/ləˈvɑːljər/ lə-VAHL-yər; born August 18, 1960) is an American former professional baseball catcher. He played in Major League Baseball (MLB) for the Philadelphia Phillies, St. Louis Cardinals, Pittsburgh Pirates, and Chicago White Sox.

== Amateur career ==
LaValliere played baseball for the University of Massachusetts Lowell and graduated in 1982. He is a 1996 inductee to the school's athletics hall of fame. In 1981, he played collegiate summer baseball in the Cape Cod Baseball League for the Yarmouth-Dennis Red Sox.

== Professional career ==
Signed by the Philadelphia Phillies as an amateur free agent in 1981, LaValliere started out as a third baseman but was converted to catcher in 1982. He was sent to the St. Louis Cardinals during the 1984 season as part of a conditional deal. Signing with the Cards as a free agent in 1985, LaValliere spent two years with the club, which included a trip to the World Series. Excellent at throwing out potential base stealers, he won a Gold Glove award in 1987. For his career, he threw out 36.8% of potential base stealers.

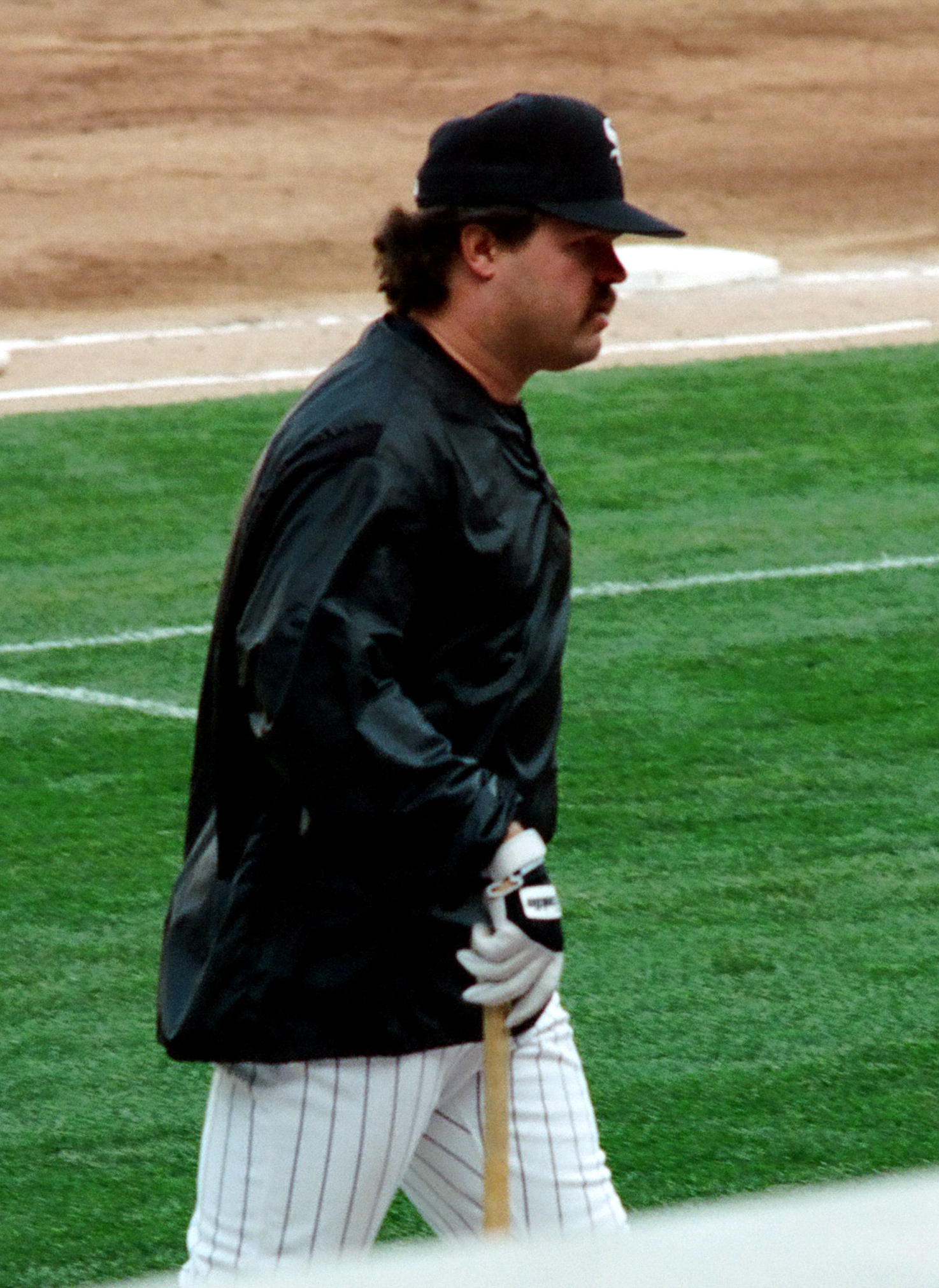
LaValliere with the Chicago White Sox in 1995

In spring training of the 1987 season, LaValliere was traded to the Pittsburgh Pirates alongside Andy Van Slyke and Mike Dunne in exchange for fellow catcher Tony Peña. LaValliere and Van Slyke later became stalwarts on the hugely successful Pirates teams of the early 1990s, when Pittsburgh went to three consecutive National League Championship Series from 1990 to 1992. The Pirates lost in all three of their NLCS appearances, in 1990 to the eventual World champion Cincinnati Reds and in 1991 and 1992 to the Atlanta Braves. In the 1992 NLCS, LaValliere was involved in the famous final play of Game 7, as Atlanta first baseman (and former Pirate) Sid Bream slid and just barely beat LaValliere's tag to score the Series-winning run for the Braves. LaValliere contends that he tagged Bream out, claiming that Bream's foot popped up over home and he tagged his back leg.

During the 1993 season, LaValliere was released by Pittsburgh, and signed a contract with the Chicago White Sox. The White Sox won the American League West division title, but lost in the ALCS to the eventual world champion Toronto Blue Jays. LaValliere spent two more seasons in Chicago before retiring. He is a junior varsity coach and teaches catching and hitting at IMG Academy in Bradenton, Florida.

In 879 games over 12 seasons, LaValliere posted a .268 batting average (663-for-2473) with 185 runs, 18 home runs, 294 RBI and 321 bases on balls. Defensively, he recorded a .992 fielding percentage as a catcher. In 11 postseason games, he hit .200 (5-for-25) with 2 runs, 1 RBI and 6 walks.
