= 1994 Philadelphia Phillies season =

Major League Baseball season

1994 Philadelphia Phillies
- League: National League
- Division: East
- Ballpark: Veterans Stadium
- City: Philadelphia
- Record: 54–61 (.470)
- Divisional place: 4th
- Owners: Bill Giles
- General managers: Lee Thomas
- Managers: Jim Fregosi
- Television: WPHL-TV; PRISM; SportsChannel Philadelphia (Harry Kalas, Richie Ashburn, Andy Musser, Chris Wheeler, Garry Maddox, Kent Tekulve, Todd Kalas)
- Radio: WOGL (Harry Kalas, Richie Ashburn, Andy Musser, Chris Wheeler, Todd Kalas)

The 1994 Philadelphia Phillies season was the 112th season in the history of the franchise.

== Offseason ==
- November 2, 1993: Heathcliff Slocumb was traded by the Cleveland Indians to the Philadelphia Phillies for Ruben Amaro.
- December 2, 1993: Mitch Williams was traded by the Philadelphia Phillies to the Houston Astros for Doug Jones and Jeff Juden.
- February 9, 1994: Terry Mulholland was traded by the Philadelphia Phillies with a player to be named later to the New York Yankees for Bobby Muñoz, Ryan Karp, and Kevin Jordan. The Philadelphia Phillies sent Jeff Patterson (November 8, 1994) to the New York Yankees to complete the trade.

== Regular season ==
By Friday, August 12, 1994, the Phillies had compiled a 54–61 record through 115 games. They had scored 521 runs (4.53 per game) and allowed 497 runs (4.32 per game). They finished the strike-shortened season 28th in home runs, with just 80 (tied with the Pittsburgh Pirates).

=== Season standings ===
NL East
Team	W	L	Pct.	GB	Home	Road
Montreal Expos	74	40	.649	—	32‍–‍20	42‍–‍20
Atlanta Braves	68	46	.596	6	31‍–‍24	37‍–‍22
New York Mets	55	58	.487	18½	23‍–‍30	32‍–‍28
Philadelphia Phillies	54	61	.470	20½	34‍–‍26	20‍–‍35
Florida Marlins	51	64	.443	23½	25‍–‍34	26‍–‍30

Division leaders
Team	W	L	Pct.
Montreal Expos	74	40	.649
Cincinnati Reds	66	48	.579
Los Angeles Dodgers	58	56	.509

Wild Card team	W	L	Pct.	GB
Atlanta Braves	68	46	0.597	—
Houston Astros	66	49	0.574	2 1/2
New York Mets	55	58	0.487	12 1/2
San Francisco Giants	55	60	0.478	13 1/2
Philadelphia Phillies	54	61	0.470	14 1/2
St. Louis Cardinals	53	61	0.465	15
Pittsburgh Pirates	53	61	0.465	15
Colorado Rockies	53	64	0.453	16 1/2
Florida Marlins	51	64	0.444	17 1/2
Chicago Cubs	49	64	0.434	18 1/2
San Diego Padres	47	70	0.402	22 1/2

=== Record vs. opponents ===
1994 National League record Source: MLB Standings Grid – 1994
Team	ATL	CHC	CIN	COL	FLA	HOU	LAD	MON	NYM	PHI	PIT	SD	SF	STL
Atlanta	—	4–2	5–5	8–2	8–4	3–3	6–0	4–5	5–4	6–3	3–9	6–1	5–1	5–7
Chicago	2–4	—	5–7	6–6	4–5	4–8	3–3	2–4	1–4	1–6	5–5	6–3	5–4	5–5
Cincinnati	5–5	7–5	—	4–4	7–5	4–6	3–6	4–2	2–4	4–2	9–3	8–2	7–2	2–2–1
Colorado	2–8	6–6	4–4	—	3–9	5–5	4–6	4–2	5–1	2–4	2–3	5–5	3–7	8–4
Florida	4–8	5–4	5–7	9–3	—	2–4	3–3	2–7	6–4	4–6	1–6	5–1	2–4	3–7
Houston	3–3	8–4	6–4	5–5	4–2	—	1–8	2–4	3–3	5–1	8–4	5–5	8–2	8–4
Los Angeles	0–6	3–3	6–3	6–4	3–3	8–1	—	3–9	6–6	7–5	3–3	6–4	5–5	2–4
Montreal	5–4	4–2	2–4	2–4	7–2	4–2	9–3	—	4–3	5–4	8–2	12–0	5–7	7–3
New York	4–5	4–1	4–2	1–5	4–6	3–3	6–6	3–4	—	4–6	4–5	6–6	6–6	6–3
Philadelphia	3-6	6–1	2–4	4–2	6–4	1–5	5–7	4–5	6–4	—	5–4	4–8	4–8	4–3
Pittsburgh	9–3	5–5	3–9	3–2	6–1	4–8	3–3	2–8	5–4	4–5	—	3–3	1–5	5–5
San Diego	1–6	3–6	2–8	5–5	1–5	5–5	4–6	0–12	6–6	8–4	3–3	—	5–2	4–2
San Francisco	1–5	4–5	2–7	7–3	4–2	2–8	5–5	7–5	6–6	8–4	5–1	2–5	—	2–4
St. Louis	7–5	5–5	2–2–1	4–8	7–3	4–8	4–2	3–7	3–6	3–4	5–5	2–4	4–2	—

=== Notable transactions ===
- April 29, 1994: Roger Mason was purchased by the New York Mets from the Philadelphia Phillies.

=== 1994 game Log ===
Legend
	Phillies win
	Phillies loss
	Postponement
**Bold**	Phillies team member

1994 Game Log
Overall Record: 54–61
April (9–14)

#	Date	Opponent	Score	Win	Loss	Save	Attendance	Record
1	April 4	@ Rockies	12–6	**Heathcliff Slocumb** (1–0)	Mike Munoz (0–1)	None	72,470	1–0
2	April 6	@ Rockies	7–5	**Roger Mason** (1–0)	Darren Holmes (0–1)	**Doug Jones** (1)	50,875	2–0
3	April 7	@ Rockies	13–8	**Heathcliff Slocumb** (2–0)	Steve Reed (0–1)	**Bobby Muñoz** (1)	48,021	3–0
4	April 8	@ Reds	4–5 (10)	Héctor Carrasco (2–0)	**David West** (0–1)	None	27,868	3–1
5	April 9	@ Reds	1–2	John Smiley (1–0)	**Curt Schilling** (0–1)	Héctor Carrasco (1)	25,666	3–2
6	April 10	@ Reds	5–7	Pete Schourek (1–0)	**Jeff Juden** (0–1)	Chuck McElroy (1)	21,131	3–3
7	April 11	Rockies	7–8	Bruce Ruffin (1–0)	**Roger Mason** (1–1)	Darren Holmes (1)	58,627	3–4
8	April 13	Rockies	12–3	**Ben Rivera** (1–0)	Greg W. Harris (0–1)	None	23,346	4–4
9	April 14	Rockies	0–5	David Nied (2–0)	**Curt Schilling** (0–2)	None	24,856	4–5
10	April 15	Reds	3–1	**Jeff Juden** (1–1)	John Smiley (1–1)	**Doug Jones** (2)	32,980	5–5
11	April 16	Reds	6–4	**Danny Jackson** (1–0)	Erik Hanson (0–1)	**Doug Jones** (3)	36,070	6–5
12	April 17	Reds	0–7	Tom Browning (1–0)	**Shawn Boskie** (0–1)	None	43,400	6–6
13	April 18	Dodgers	5–4	**Doug Jones** (1–0)	Gary Wayne (0–2)	None	26,666	7–6
14	April 19	Dodgers	7–8	Todd Worrell (1–1)	**Doug Jones** (1–1)	Darren Dreifort (1)	35,170	7–7
15	April 20	@ Giants	4–5	Bill Swift (3–1)	**Jeff Juden** (1–2)	Mike Jackson (3)	18,182	7–8
16	April 21	@ Giants	6–1	**Danny Jackson** (2–0)	Salomón Torres (0–2)	None	18,918	8–8
17	April 22	@ Padres	5–6	Trevor Hoffman (1–0)	**David West** (0–2)	None	19,069	8–9
18	April 23	@ Padres	2–8	Tim Mauser (1–0)	**Ben Rivera** (1–1)	Pedro Martínez (1)	32,745	8–10
19	April 24	@ Padres	5–6	Andy Benes (1–4)	**Curt Schilling** (0–3)	Trevor Hoffman (3)	11,403	8–11
20	April 26	@ Dodgers	3–4	Gary Wayne (1–2)	**David West** (0–3)	Todd Worrell (2)	28,194	8–12
21	April 27	@ Dodgers	4–5 (10)	Jim Gott (2–1)	**Larry Andersen** (0–1)	None	30,065	8–13
22	April 29	Giants	6–3	**Ben Rivera** (2–1)	Bryan Hickerson (1–1)	None	30,977	9–13
23	April 30	Giants	0–1	John Burkett (3–1)	**Curt Schilling** (0–4)	Rod Beck (2)	37,019	9–14

May (15–13)

#	Date	Opponent	Score	Win	Loss	Save	Attendance	Record
24	May 1	Giants	6–4	**Heathcliff Slocumb** (3–0)	Bill Swift (3–3)	**Doug Jones** (4)	50,588	10–14
25	May 2	Padres	7–2	**Danny Jackson** (3–0)	Andy Ashby (0–3)	None	26,481	11–14
26	May 3	Padres	3–8	A. J. Sager (1–2)	**Jeff Juden** (1–3)	None	24,489	11–15
–	May 4	Padres	Postponed (rain); Makeup: July 22 as a traditional double-header					
27	May 5	@ Marlins	0–5	Chris Hammond (2–3)	**Ben Rivera** (2–2)	None	26,329	11–16
28	May 6	@ Marlins	5–9	David Weathers (5–1)	**Curt Schilling** (0–5)	None	31,368	11–17
29	May 7	@ Marlins	7–8 (11)	Richie Lewis (1–1)	**David West** (0–4)	None	41,002	11–18
30	May 8	@ Marlins	9–2	**Danny Jackson** (4–0)	Charlie Hough (3–1)	None	38,584	12–18
31	May 9	@ Braves	2–7	Steve Avery (3–1)	**Jeff Juden** (1–4)	None	44,987	12–19
32	May 10	@ Braves	8–9 (15)	Mike Stanton (1–0)	**Andy Carter** (0–1)	None	47,014	12–20
33	May 11	@ Braves	2–4	Greg Maddux (6–2)	**Curt Schilling** (0–6)	Greg McMichael (7)	46,985	12–21
34	May 12	Pirates	6–4	**Tommy Greene** (1–0)	Zane Smith (4–3)	**Doug Jones** (5)	32,481	13–21
35	May 13	Pirates	12–1	**Danny Jackson** (5–0)	Paul Wagner (3–3)	None	32,281	14–21
36	May 14	Pirates	3–2	**Mike Williams** (1–0)	Steve Cooke (1–4)	**Doug Jones** (6)	39,916	15–21
37	May 15	Pirates	1–0	**Shawn Boskie** (1–1)	Jon Lieber (0–1)	**Doug Jones** (7)	53,396	16–21
38	May 16	Expos	1–4	Butch Henry (1–0)	**Curt Schilling** (0–7)	Mel Rojas (10)	28,236	16–22
39	May 17	Expos	6–5	**Doug Jones** (2–1)	John Wetteland (2–3)	None	36,233	17–22
40	May 18	Expos	1–6	Jeff Fassero (4–2)	**Danny Jackson** (5–1)	None	41,032	17–23
41	May 20	Mets	5–3	**Mike Williams** (2–0)	Mauro Gozzo (2–1)	**Doug Jones** (8)	34,924	18–23
42	May 21	Mets	9–8	**Bob Wells** (1–0)	Doug Linton (4–1)	**Doug Jones** (9)	43,443	19–23
43	May 22	Mets	8–3	**Tommy Greene** (2–0)	Pete Smith (2–5)	None	53,340	20–23
44	May 23	@ Cardinals	11–3	**Danny Jackson** (6–1)	Tom Urbani (1–4)	None	30,648	21–23
45	May 24	@ Cardinals	4–0	**Heathcliff Slocumb** (4–0)	Mike Pérez (1–1)	None	25,618	22–23
46	May 25	@ Cardinals	5–10	Bryan Eversgerd (2–0)	**Mike Williams** (2–1)	None	24,123	22–24
47	May 27	Astros	2–4	Shane Reynolds (3–1)	**Shawn Boskie** (1–2)	John Hudek (5)	41,013	22–25
48	May 28	Astros	5–7	Brian Williams (1–2)	**Andy Carter** (0–2)	Todd Jones (1)	40,523	22–26
49	May 29	Astros	4–2	**David West** (1–4)	Doug Drabek (7–2)	**Doug Jones** (10)	52,390	23–26
50	May 30	@ Cubs	0–3	Willie Banks (6–4)	**Bobby Muñoz** (0–1)	Randy Myers (12)	35,834	23–27
51	May 31	@ Cubs	8–7	**Larry Andersen** (1–1)	Randy Myers (0–2)	**Doug Jones** (11)	30,110	24–27

June (15–12)

#	Date	Opponent	Score	Win	Loss	Save	Attendance	Record
52	June 1	@ Cubs	4–2	**Shawn Boskie** (2–2)	Mike Morgan (0–7)	**Doug Jones** (12)	27,402	25–27
53	June 2	@ Cubs	4–2	**Danny Jackson** (7–1)	Anthony Young (3–4)	**Doug Jones** (13)	31,595	26–27
54	June 3	@ Astros	2–4	Brian Williams (2–2)	**David West** (1–5)	John Hudek (7)	31,280	26–28
55	June 4	@ Astros	1–5	Doug Drabek (8–2)	**Bobby Muñoz** (0–2)	None	23,455	26–29
56	June 5	@ Astros	2–4	Darryl Kile (4–2)	**Mike Williams** (2–2)	John Hudek (8)	20,694	26–30
57	June 6	Cubs	3–1	**Shawn Boskie** (3–2)	Jim Bullinger (3–1)	**Doug Jones** (14)	25,838	27–30
58	June 7	Cubs	7–6	**Paul Quantrill** (2–1)	Randy Myers (0–3)	**Doug Jones** (15)	36,543	28–30
59	June 8	Cubs	3–0	**David West** (2–5)	Kevin Foster (0–1)	**Doug Jones** (16)	35,431	29–30
60	June 9	Cardinals	6–2	**Bobby Muñoz** (1–2)	Vicente Palacios (1–3)	**Paul Quantrill** (1)	34,759	30–30
61	June 10	Cardinals	3–4	Rick Sutcliffe (3–2)	**Mike Williams** (2–3)	Mike Pérez (12)	36,652	30–31
62	June 11	Cardinals	4–7	Omar Olivares (1–0)	**Shawn Boskie** (3–3)	René Arocha (4)	39,065	30–32
63	June 12	Cardinals	7–2	**Danny Jackson** (8–1)	Bob Tewksbury (8–5)	None	48,682	31–32
64	June 13	@ Mets	3–4	Bret Saberhagen (7–3)	**David West** (2–6)	John Franco (15)	17,555	31–33
65	June 14	@ Mets	3–2	**Bobby Muñoz** (2–2)	Dwight Gooden (2–3)	**Doug Jones** (17)	17,914	32–33
66	June 15	@ Mets	0–1	Bobby J. Jones (7–5)	**Mike Williams** (2–4)	John Franco (16)	18,397	32–34
67	June 17	@ Expos	10–8	**Paul Quantrill** (3–1)	John Wetteland (2–4)	**Doug Jones** (18)	30,235	33–34
68	June 18	@ Expos	8–4	**Danny Jackson** (9–1)	Gabe White (1–1)	None	28,354	34–34
69	June 19	@ Expos	13–0	**Bobby Muñoz** (3–2)	Jeff Fassero (5–5)	None	15,092	35–34
70	June 21	@ Pirates	1–7	Steve Cooke (3–5)	**Shawn Boskie** (3–4)	None	19,568	35–35
71	June 22	@ Pirates	4–5	Ravelo Manzanillo (2–1)	**Heathcliff Slocumb** (4–1)	Alejandro Peña (5)	26,376	35–36
72	June 24	Braves	4–9	Tom Glavine (8–7)	**Danny Jackson** (9–2)	Mike Stanton (2)	47,523	35–37
73	June 25	Braves	7–1	**Bobby Muñoz** (4–2)	Kent Mercker (6–2)	None	57,961	36–37
74	June 26	Braves	9–8	**Toby Borland** (1–0)	Steve Avery (5–2)	**Doug Jones** (19)	52,545	37–37
75	June 27	Marlins	5–1	**Shawn Boskie** (4–4)	Kurt Miller (1–3)	None	34,638	38–37
76	June 28	Marlins	1–2	Jeff Mutis (1–0)	**Paul Quantrill** (3–2)	Robb Nen (7)	47,027	38–38
77	June 29	Marlins	5–2	**Danny Jackson** (10–2)	Pat Rapp (4–4)	**Doug Jones** (20)	43,337	39–38
78	June 30	@ Dodgers	3–4	Rudy Seánez (1–1)	**Doug Jones** (2–2)	None	31,295	39–39

July (12–15)

#	Date	Opponent	Score	Win	Loss	Save	Attendance	Record
79	July 1	@ Dodgers	3–0	**David West** (3–6)	Kevin Gross (7–5)	**Doug Jones** (21)	34,978	40–39
80	July 2	@ Dodgers	3–9	Tom Candiotti (6–3)	**Paul Quantrill** (3–3)	None	38,237	40–40
81	July 3	@ Dodgers	1–3	Orel Hershiser (5–4)	**Fernando Valenzuela** (0–1)	Todd Worrell (7)	54,167	40–41
82	July 4	@ Padres	10–4	**Danny Jackson** (11–2)	Scott Sanders (3–5)	None	23,676	41–41
83	July 5	@ Padres	2–7	Joey Hamilton (5–3)	**Bobby Muñoz** (4–3)	None	7,812	41–42
84	July 6	@ Padres	2–5	Bill Krueger (1–3)	**David West** (3–7)	Trevor Hoffman (14)	12,113	41–43
85	July 7	@ Giants	4–5	Bud Black (2–0)	**Shawn Boskie** (4–5)	Rod Beck (16)	22,481	41–44
86	July 8	@ Giants	2–3	Mark Portugal (7–6)	**Fernando Valenzuela** (0–2)	Rod Beck (17)	24,437	41–45
87	July 9	@ Giants	2–3	William Van Landingham (4–1)	**Danny Jackson** (11–3)	Rod Beck (18)	35,823	41–46
88	July 10	@ Giants	1–2 (10)	Dave Burba (1–5)	**Doug Jones** (2–3)	None	48,263	41–47
–	July 12	**1994 Major League Baseball All-Star Game at Three Rivers Stadium in Pittsburgh**						
–	July 14	Dodgers	Postponed (rain); Makeup: July 15 as a traditional double-header					
89	July 15 (1)	Dodgers	4–3	**David West** (4–7)	Kevin Gross (7–6)	**Doug Jones** (22)	see 2nd game	42–47
90	July 15 (2)	Dodgers	2–3	Tom Candiotti (7–4)	**Danny Jackson** (11–4)	Todd Worrell (8)	58,247	42–48
91	July 16	Dodgers	10–6	**Bobby Muñoz** (5–3)	Ramón Martínez (8–6)	**Toby Borland** (1)	46,679	43–48
92	July 17	Dodgers	9–7	**Fernando Valenzuela** (1–2)	Pedro Astacio (6–7)	**Doug Jones** (23)	50,993	44–48
93	July 18	Giants	5–7	Bryan Hickerson (3–8)	**Shawn Boskie** (4–6)	Rod Beck (21)	39,066	44–49
94	July 19	Giants	5–2	**Danny Jackson** (12–4)	Bud Black (3–1)	**Doug Jones** (24)	38,559	45–49
95	July 20	Giants	2–9	Mark Portugal (9–6)	**David West** (4–8)	None	43,966	45–50
96	July 22 (1)	Padres	4–3	**Bobby Muñoz** (6–3)	Joey Hamilton (6–5)	**Doug Jones** (25)	see 2nd game	46–50
97	July 22 (2)	Padres	4–7	Pedro Martínez (3–1)	**Larry Andersen** (1–2)	Trevor Hoffman (15)	38,423	46–51
98	July 23	Padres	1–7	Bill Krueger (2–4)	**Ben Rivera** (2–3)	None	35,269	46–52
99	July 24	Padres	5–3	**Danny Jackson** (13–4)	Andy Ashby (4–10)	**Doug Jones** (26)	41,971	47–52
100	July 25	@ Marlins	8–1	**Curt Schilling** (1–7)	David Weathers (8–9)	None	30,082	48–52
101	July 26	@ Marlins	10–8 (12)	**Ben Rivera** (3–3)	Robb Nen (4–5)	None	32,648	49–52
102	July 27	@ Marlins	3–1	**Bobby Muñoz** (7–3)	Pat Rapp (6–6)	None	40,017	50–52
103	July 29	@ Braves	2–5	Steve Avery (7–3)	**Danny Jackson** (13–5)	None	48,921	50–53
104	July 30	@ Braves	5–2	**Heathcliff Slocumb** (5–1)	Greg McMichael (3–5)	**Doug Jones** (27)	49,101	51–53
105	July 31	@ Braves	5–9	Mike Bielecki (2–0)	**Ben Rivera** (3–4)	None	48,992	51–54

August (3–7)

#	Date	Opponent	Score	Win	Loss	Save	Attendance	Record
106	August 2	Pirates	2–3	Rick White (4–5)	**Bobby Muñoz** (7–4)	Dan Miceli (2)	40,164	51–55
107	August 3	Pirates	7–0	**Danny Jackson** (14–5)	Steve Cooke (4–10)	None	36,542	52–55
108	August 4	Pirates	1–5	Jon Lieber (6–6)	**Curt Schilling** (1–8)	None	37,481	52–56
109	August 5	Expos	0–5	Pedro Martínez (10–5)	**David West** (4–9)	None	33,642	52–57
110	August 6	Expos	3–4 (11)	John Wetteland (4–6)	**Doug Jones** (2–4)	Jeff Shaw (1)	41,699	52–58
111	August 7	Expos	4–6	Ken Hill (16–5)	**Bobby Muñoz** (7–5)	Mel Rojas (16)	45,346	52–59
112	August 8	Mets	2–3	Bobby J. Jones (12–7)	**Danny Jackson** (14–6)	John Franco (29)	35,977	52–60
113	August 9	Mets	5–1	**Curt Schilling** (2–8)	Mike Remlinger (1–5)	None	31,740	53–60
114	August 10	Mets	2–6	Bret Saberhagen (14–4)	**David West** (4–10)	John Franco (30)	36,716	53–61
115	August 11	Mets	2–1 (15)	**Tom Edens** (5–1)	Mauro Gozzo (3–5)	None	37,605	54–61

=== Roster ===
1994 Philadelphia Phillies
**Roster**
**Pitchers**: 47 Larry Andersen; 42 Toby Borland; 45 Shawn Boskie; 52 Ricky Bottalico; 50 Andy Carter; 45 Tom Edens; 49 Tommy Greene; 27 Danny Jackson; 23 Doug Jones; 37,43 Jeff Juden; 48 Roger Mason; 35 Bobby Muñoz; 48 Paul Quantrill; 34 Ben Rivera; 38 Curt Schilling; 51 Heathcliff Slocumb; 33 Fernando Valenzuela; 56 Bob Wells; 40 David West; 41 Mike Williams	**Catchers**: 10 Darren Daulton; 24 Mike Lieberthal; 3,6 Todd Pratt; **Infielders**: 5 Kim Batiste; 7 Mariano Duncan; 15 Dave Hollins; 17 Ricky Jordan; 29 John Kruk; 12 Mickey Morandini; 30 Tom Quinlan; 31 Randy Ready; 19 Kevin Stocker	**Outfielders**: 44 Wes Chamberlain; 4 Lenny Dykstra; 8 Jim Eisenreich; 3 Billy Hatcher; 22 Pete Incaviglia; 16 Tony Longmire; 21 Tom Marsh; 25 Milt Thompson	**Manager**: 11 Jim Fregosi; **Coaches**: 2 Larry Bowa (third base); 14 Denis Menke (hitting); 46 Johnny Podres (pitching); 26 Mel Roberts (first base); 9 Mike Ryan (bullpen); 18 John Vukovich (bench)

== Player statistics ==
=== Batting ===
==== Starters by position ====
Note: Pos = Position; G = Games played; AB = At bats; H = Hits; Avg. = Batting average; HR = Home runs; RBI = Runs batted in

Pos	Player	G	AB	H	Avg.	HR	RBI
C	Darren Daulton	69	257	77	.300	15	56
1B	John Kruk	75	255	77	.302	5	38
2B	Mickey Morandini	87	274	80	.292	2	26
SS	Kevin Stocker	82	271	74	.273	2	28
3B	Dave Hollins	44	162	36	.222	4	26
LF	Pete Incaviglia	80	244	56	.230	13	32
CF	Lenny Dykstra	84	315	86	.273	5	24
RF	Jim Eisenreich	104	290	87	.300	4	43

==== Other batters ====
Note: G = Games played; AB = At bats; H = Hits; Avg. = Batting average; HR = Home runs; RBI = Runs batted in

Player	G	AB	H	Avg.	HR	RBI
Mariano Duncan	88	347	93	.268	8	48
Milt Thompson	87	220	60	.273	3	30
Ricky Jordan	72	220	62	.282	8	37
Kim Batiste	64	209	49	.234	1	13
Tony Longmire	69	139	33	.237	0	17
Billy Hatcher	43	134	33	.246	2	13
Todd Pratt	28	102	20	.196	2	9
Mike Lieberthal	24	79	21	.266	1	5
Wes Chamberlain	24	69	19	.275	2	6
Randy Ready	17	42	16	.381	1	3
Tom Quinlan	24	35	7	.200	1	3
Tom Marsh	8	18	5	.278	0	3

=== Pitching ===
==== Starting pitchers ====
Note: G = Games pitched;; IP = Innings pitched; W = Wins; L = Losses; ERA = Earned run average; SO = Strikeouts

Player	G	IP	W	L	ERA	SO
Danny Jackson	25	179.1	14	6	3.26	129
Bobby Muñoz	21	104.1	7	5	2.67	59
Shawn Boskie	18	84.1	4	6	5.23	59
Curt Schilling	13	82.1	2	8	4.48	58
Fernando Valenzuela	8	45.0	1	2	3.00	19
Tommy Greene	7	35.2	2	0	4.54	28
Jeff Juden	6	27.2	1	4	6.18	22

==== Other pitchers ====
Note: G = Games pitched; IP = Innings pitched; W = Wins; L = Losses; ERA = Earned run average; SO = Strikeouts

Player	G	IP	W	L	ERA	SO
David West	31	99.0	4	10	3.58	83
Mike Williams	12	50.1	2	4	5.01	29
Ben Rivera	9	38.0	3	4	6.87	19

==== Relief pitchers ====
Note: G = Games pitched; W = Wins; L = Losses; SV = Saves; ERA = Earned run average; SO = Strikeouts

Player	G	W	L	SV	ERA	SO
Doug Jones	47	2	4	27	2.17	38
Heathcliff Slocumb	52	5	1	0	2.86	58
Larry Andersen	29	1	2	0	4.41	27
Toby Borland	24	1	0	1	2.36	26
Andy Carter	20	0	2	0	4.46	18
Paul Quantrill	18	2	2	1	6.00	13
Roger Mason	6	1	1	0	5.19	7
Bob Wells	6	1	0	0	1.80	3
Tom Edens	3	1	0	0	2.25	1
Ricky Bottalico	3	0	0	0	0.00	3

== Farm system ==
Level	Team	League	Manager
AAA	Scranton/Wilkes-Barre; Red Barons	International League	Mike Quade
AA	Reading Phillies	Eastern League	Bill Dancy
A	Clearwater Phillies	Florida State League	Don McCormack
A	Spartanburg Phillies	South Atlantic League	Roy Majtyka
A-Short Season	Batavia Clippers	New York–Penn League	Al LeBoeuf
Rookie	Martinsville Phillies	Appalachian League	Ramon Henderson
