= 1994 Montreal Expos season =

1994 Montreal Expos
- League: National League
- Division: East
- Ballpark: Olympic Stadium
- City: Montreal
- Record: 74–40
- Divisional place: 1st
- Owners: Claude Brochu
- General managers: Kevin Malone
- Managers: Felipe Alou
- Television: The Sports Network (Dave Van Horne, Ken Singleton) SRC (Claude Raymond, Camille Dube); RDS Network (Denis Casavant, Alain Chantelois)
- Radio: CIQC (English) (Dave Van Horne, Rich Griffin, Ken Singleton, Elliott Price) CKAC (French) (Jacques Doucet, Rodger Brulotte, Alain Chantelois)

The 1994 Montreal Expos season was the 26th season of the franchise. They had the best record in Major League Baseball (74–40), when the 1994–95 Major League Baseball strike ended the season and the team's postseason aspirations. From June 1 forward, Montreal transformed into the dominant club in the league, going 46−18 until the strike. In turn, they also produced the most successful season in franchise history in terms of winning percentage (.649, which would have been 105–57 in a full season). Five Expos represented the National League at the All-Star Game held in Pittsburgh, including Moisés Alou, who had the game-winning hit for the National League.

The team was covered in-depth in the 2025 Netflix documentary Who Killed the Montreal Expos?

== Offseason ==
- November 19, 1993: Delino DeShields was traded by the Expos to the Los Angeles Dodgers for Pedro Martínez.
- December 13, 1993: The Expos traded a player to be named later to the Cleveland Indians for Randy Milligan. The Expos completed the deal by sending Brian Barnes to the Indians on December 17.
- March 31, 1994: John Vander Wal was purchased from the Expos by the Colorado Rockies.

== Spring training ==
The Expos held spring training at West Palm Beach Municipal Stadium in West Palm Beach, Florida – a facility they shared with the Atlanta Braves. It was their 18th season at the stadium; they had conducted spring training there from 1969 to 1972 and since 1981.

== Regular season ==
=== Opening Day starters ===
- Moisés Alou
- Sean Berry
- Wil Cordero
- Darrin Fletcher
- Cliff Floyd
- Marquis Grissom
- Mike Lansing
- Pedro Martínez
- Larry Walker

=== Summary ===
On April 13, 1994, Pedro Martínez took a perfect game through 7 1/3 innings versus the Cincinnati Reds until throwing a brushback pitch at Reggie Sanders led Sanders to charge the mound, starting a bench-clearing brawl. Martínez ended up with a no-decision in the game, which the Expos eventually won 3–2.

One amusing moment occurred on April 24 while playing the Dodgers at Dodger Stadium in Los Angeles. With one out in the third inning, right fielder Larry Walker caught a Mike Piazza fly ball and innocently handed it to young fan, six year old Sebastian Napier, thinking it was the third out of the inning. He noticed that José Offerman, already on base, was running at full speed. Walker managed to retrieve the ball from Napier, and held Offerman to third base. Embarrassed, Walker remarked that he "told the little kid that maybe next time I'll give him a ball when there are three outs instead of two. Everybody around him was laughing." Where Offerman was stationed made little difference as Tim Wallach homered on the next pitch, from Martínez, for two runs. True to his word, when the Expos assumed the field in the bottom half of the fourth inning, Walker gave Napier a signed ball, inducing a standing ovation.

The National League suspended Walker four games starting June 24 for inciting a bench-clearing brawl by charging the mound in a game against Pittsburgh.

The Expos team appeared to be reaching its potential in 1994. After June 1, Montreal transformed into the dominant club in the National League, going 46−18 until the players' strike halted the season on August 11. In turn, they produced the most successful season in franchise history as they attained a major league best 74−40 record. on pace for a 106-win season

Led by an ensemble of rising young stars including Martínez, Walker, Moisés Alou, Cliff Floyd, Mike Lansing and Jeff Fassero, the Expos scored 585 runs (5.13 per game) and allowed 454 runs (3.98 per game) through 114 games by Friday, August 12. Their 1994 pitching staff was very nearly as good as that of their division rivals, the Atlanta Braves, as the Expos finished the strike-shortened season with an MLB-best 3.56 ERA, an MLB-high 46 saves and just 288 walks, the fewest in the Majors.

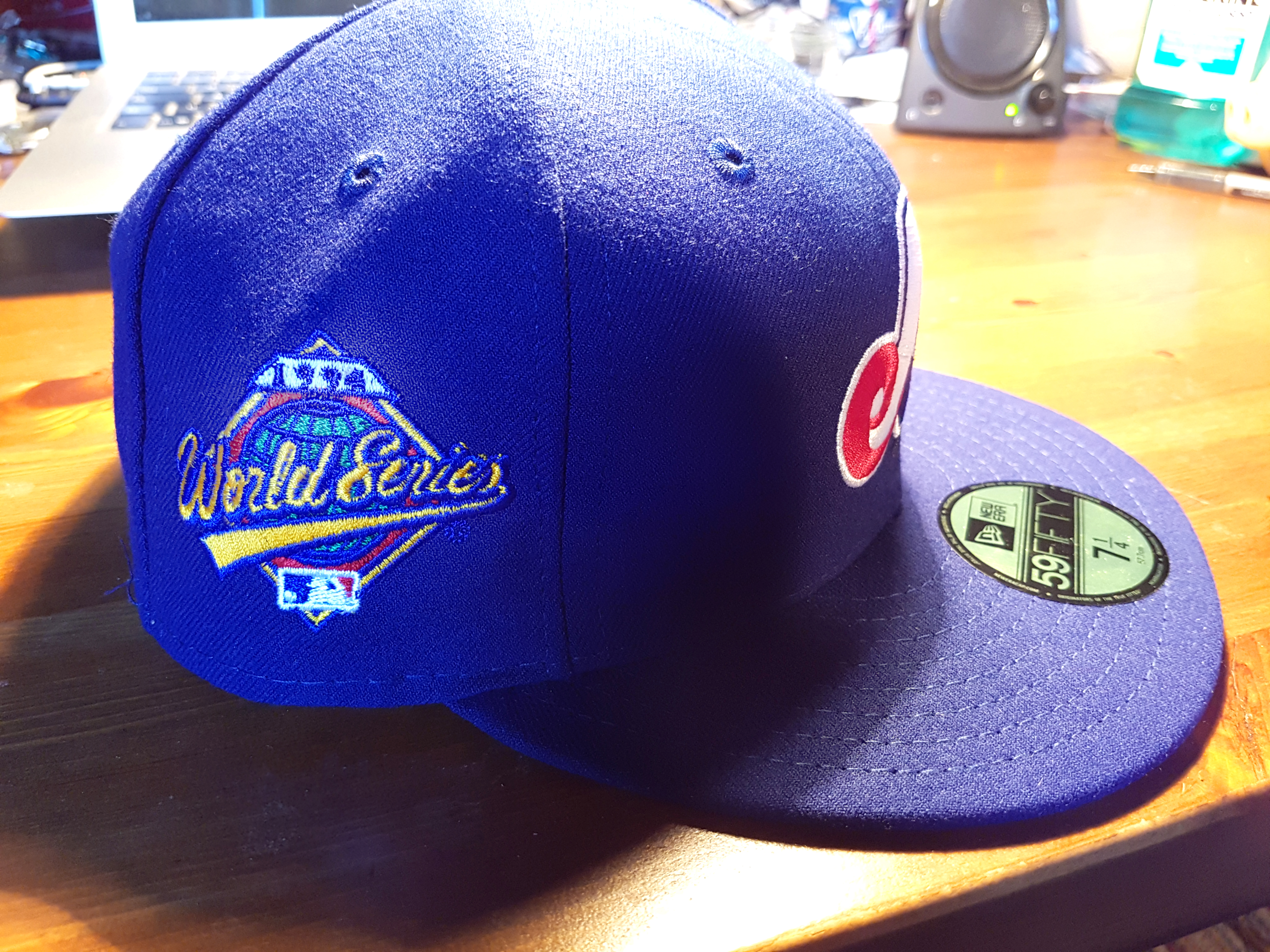
A "what if" Expos hat with a 1994 World Series logo patch

Walker, with 86 RBIs, was well on his way to his first 100-RBI year; Ken Hill was on pace to win 23 games while Pedro Martínez was on pace to strike out more than 200 batters. Moisés Alou was hitting .339 and on pace to collect more than 200 hits for the first time in his career. Marquis Grissom was on pace to score 137 runs. Two other Expos, namely Alou and Walker, were also on pace to score more than 100 runs. The team was also drawing well at home: through 52 home games in 1994, 1,276,250 fans had attended Expos games, for an average of 24,543 per game. At that pace, the Expos would have had a good chance of drawing two million fans for the first time since 1983. The season, however, was stopped due to the 1994 players' strike. The World Series, for which the Expos appeared to be destined, was never played and Montreal lost many of its players during the next season due to free agency and salary constraints and the team never recovered. The 1994 Montreal Expos team that could have been remains one of baseball's hot discussion points. The franchise would never reach the playoffs as the Expos again. The collapse of the Expos would eventually lead to the franchise's move to Washington, D.C., for the 2005 season to become the Washington Nationals.

When baseball returned for an exhibition series in Olympic Stadium in March 2014, the team was honored during a pregame ceremony, along with a banner with the words On se souvient Édition 1994 (We remember the 1994 season).

=== Game log ===
1994 Regular Season Game Log (74–40) (Home: 32–20; Road: 42–20)
April (13–10) (Home: 6–4; Road: 7–6)

#	Date	Opponent	Score	Win	Loss	Save	Attendance	Record	Report
1	April 4	@ Astros	5–6 (12 inn.)	Edens (1–0)	Shaw (0–1)		43,440	0–1	Boxscore
2	April 5	@ Astros	5–1	Hill (1–0)	Drabek (0–1)		16,227	1–1	Boxscore
3	April 6	@ Astros	9–3	Rueter (1–0)	Kile (0–1)		17,180	2–1	Boxscore
4	April 8	Cubs	0–4	Trachsel (1–0)	Martínez (0–1)		47,001	2–2	Boxscore
5	April 9	Cubs	3–4	Plesac (1–0)	Wetteland (0–1)	Myers (1)	38,635	2–3	Boxscore
6	April 10	Cubs	8–2	Hill (2–0)	Guzmán (0–2)		16,183	3–3	Boxscore
7	April 11	Reds	4–9 (11 inn.)	Carrasco (3–0)	Heredia (0–1)		12,526	3–4	Boxscore
8	April 12	Reds	1–7	Pugh (1–0)	Boucher (0–1)		12,466	3–5	Boxscore
9	April 13	Reds	3–2	Wetteland (1–1)	McElroy (0–1)		14,072	4–5	Boxscore
10	April 15	@ Rockies	2–9	Reynoso (1–1)	Fassero (0–1)		47,213	4–6	Boxscore
11	April 16	@ Rockies	3–7	Reed (1–1)	Hill (2–1)		51,347	4–7	Boxscore
12	April 17	@ Rockies	5–6 (10 inn.)	Munoz (1–1)	Heredia (0–2)		55,443	4–8	Boxscore
13	April 18	@ Giants	1–2 (11 inn.)	Jackson (1–0)	Scott (0–1)		16,502	4–9	Boxscore
14	April 19	@ Giants	4–3	Rojas (1–0)	Burba (0–1)		14,474	5–9	Boxscore
15	April 20	@ Padres	4–2	Fassero (1–1)	Sanders (1–2)	Rojas (1)	7,095	6–9	Boxscore
16	April 21	@ Padres	5–4	Hill (3–1)	Whitehurst (1–3)	Rojas (2)	11,420	7–9	Boxscore
17	April 22	@ Dodgers	7–6	Shaw (1–1)	Candiotti (3–1)	Rojas (3)	36,434	8–9	Boxscore
18	April 23	@ Dodgers	8–6 (11 inn.)	Scott (1–0)	McDowell (0–1)	Rojas (4)	39,157	9–9	Boxscore
19	April 24	@ Dodgers	1–7	Astacio (1–2)	Martínez (0–2)		38,817	9–10	Boxscore
20	April 26	Giants	7–3	Fassero (2–1)	Swift (3–2)	Rojas (5)	14,642	10–10	Boxscore
21	April 27	Giants	7–1	Hill (4–1)	Portugal (2–2)		11,605	11–10	Boxscore
22	April 29	Padres	3–1	Rueter (2–0)	Benes (1–5)	Rojas (6)	15,114	12–10	Boxscore
23	April 30	Padres	5–3	Martínez (1–2)	Sager (0–2)	Rojas (7)	18,314	13–10	Boxscore

May (15–12) (Home: 8–5; Road: 7–7)

#	Date	Opponent	Score	Win	Loss	Save	Attendance	Record	Report
24	May 1	Padres	3–2 (11 inn.)	Shaw (2–1)	Mauser (1–2)		20,626	14–10	Boxscore
25	May 2	Dodgers	10–5	Hill (5–1)	Gross (0–1)	Rojas (8)	13,262	15–10	Boxscore
26	May 3	Dodgers	4–10	Hershiser (2–0)	Henderson (0–1)		15,413	15–11	Boxscore
27	May 4	Dodgers	5–4	Rojas (2–0)	Worrell (2–2)		16,875	16–11	Boxscore
28	May 6	@ Braves	0–5	Maddux (5–2)	Martínez (1–3)		48,808	16–12	Boxscore
29	May 7	@ Braves	1–2	Glavine (3–3)	Fassero (2–2)		49,157	16–13	Boxscore
30	May 8	@ Braves	1–0	Hill (6–1)	Smoltz (2–4)	Wetteland (1)	48,742	17–13	Boxscore
31	May 9	Mets	4–5	Mason (2–1)	Rojas (2–1)	Franco (8)	13,194	17–14	Boxscore
32	May 10	Mets	2–3 (10 inn.)	Linton (4–0)	Wetteland (1–2)		13,158	17–15	Boxscore
33	May 11	Mets	4–3	Martínez (2–3)	Smith (2–4)	Rojas (9)	18,511	18–15	Boxscore
34	May 13	Cardinals	9–1	Fassero (3–2)	Palacios (0–2)	Wetteland (2)	19,427	19–15	Boxscore
35	May 14	Cardinals	3–6	Cormier (2–1)	Hill (6–2)	Pérez (7)	18,181	19-16	Boxscore
36	May 15	Cardinals	9–8	Wetteland (2–2)	Rodriguez (1–2)		30,471	20–16	Boxscore
37	May 16	@ Phillies	4–1	Henry (1–0)	Schilling (0–7)	Rojas (10)	28,236	21–16	Boxscore
38	May 17	@ Phillies	5–6	Jones (2–1)	Wetteland (2–3)		36,233	21–17	Boxscore
39	May 18	@ Phillies	6–1	Fassero (4–2)	Jackson (5–1)		41,032	22–17	Boxscore
40	May 20	@ Pirates	5–3	Hill (7–2)	Peña (1–1)	Wetteland (3)	30,804	23–17	Boxscore
41	May 21	@ Pirates	0–6	Lieber (1–1)	Rueter (2-–1)		28,022	23–18	Boxscore
42	May 22	@ Pirates	3–2	Martínez (3–3)	Neagle (4–5)	Wetteland (4)	39,037	24–18	Boxscore
43	May 23	@ Marlins	2–3	Rapp (3–1)	Fassero (4–3)	Nen (2)	30,508	24–19	Boxscore
44	May 24	@ Marlins	11–1	Henry (2–0)	Hough (4–3)		26,598	25–19	Boxscore
45	May 25	@ Marlins	3–1	Hill (8–2)	Gardner (1–2)	Wetteland (5)	25,025	26–19	Boxscore
46	May 27	Rockies	4–2	White (1–0)	Painter (0–2)	Wetteland (6)	22,882	27–19	Boxscore
47	May 28	Rockies	2–3 (10 inn.)	Ruffin (2–1)	Scott (1–2)	Bottenfield (1)	30,452	27–20	Boxscore
48	May 29	Rockies	4–3 (10 inn.)	Scott (2–2)	Ruffin (2–2)		26,774	28–20	Boxscore
49	May 30	@ Reds	3–7	Rijo (3–3)	Hill (8–3)		27,875	28–21	Boxscore
50	May 31	@ Reds	4–5 (13 inn.)	Schourek (3–0)	Shaw (2–2)		25,046	28–22	Boxscore

June (19–8) (Home: 9–6; Road: 10–2)

#	Date	Opponent	Score	Win	Loss	Save	Attendance	Record	Report
51	June 1	@ Reds	10–9	Scott (3–2)	Carrasco (3–2)	Martínez (1)	23,653	29–22	Boxscore
52	June 3	@ Cubs	3–1	Shaw (3–1)	Crim (2–1)	Wetteland (7)	26,037	30–22	Boxscore
53	June 4	@ Cubs	6–1	Martínez (4–4)	Banks (6–5)		37,187	31–22	Boxscore
54	June 5	@ Cubs	10–5 (13 inn.)	Heredia (1–2)	Otto (0–1)		34,181	32–22	Boxscore
55	June 6	Astros	10–5	Henry (3–0)	Swindell (5–2)	Wetteland (8)	14,322	33–22	Boxscore
56	June 7	Astros	3–2	Heredia (2–2)	Veres (2–3)	Wetteland (9)	17,283	34–22	Boxscore
57	June 8	Astros	2–9	Williams (3–2)	Fassero (4–4)		17,289	34–23	Boxscore
58	June 9	@ Mets	9–0	Martínez (5–4)	Gooden (2–2)		16,775	35–23	Boxscore
59	June 10	@ Mets	6–4	Hill (9–3)	Jones (6–5)	Wetteland (10)	19,924	36-23	Boxscore
60	June 11	@ Mets	7–4	Heredia (3–2)	Gozzo (2–3)	Wetteland (11)	29,307	37–23	Boxscore
61	June 12	@ Mets	4–5	Manzanillo (1–1)	Rojas (2–2)	Franco (14)	28,429	37–24	Boxscore
62	June 13	Pirates	10–2	Fassero (5–4)	Neagle (6–7)		17,236	38–24	Boxscore
63	June 14	Pirates	12–7	Martínez (6–4)	Smith (6–6)	Wetteland (12)	15,781	39–24	Boxscore
64	June 15	Pirates	13–2	Hill (10–3)	Wagner (4–5)	Henry (1)	21,269	40–24	Boxscore
65	June 17	Phillies	8–10	Quantrill (2–0)	Wetteland (2–4)	Jones (18)	30,235	40–25	Boxscore
66	June 18	Phillies	4–8	Jackson (9–1)	White (1–1)		28,354	40–26	Boxscore
67	June 19	Phillies	0–13	Muñoz (3–2)	Fassero (5–5)		15,092	40–27	Boxscore
68	June 20	@ Cardinals	8–4	Shaw (4–1)	Murphy (2–3)	Rojas (11)	27,658	41–27	Boxscore
69	June 21	@ Cardinals	4–5	Murphy (3–3)	Wetteland (2–5)		30,940	41–28	Boxscore
70	June 22	@ Cardinals	6–4	Rueter (3–1)	Tewksbury (8–7)	Wetteland (13)	30,257	42–28	Boxscore
71	June 24	Marlins	9–0	Henry (4–0)	Rapp (4–3)	Rojas (12)	25,266	43–28	Boxscore
72	June 25	Marlins	7–3	Heredia (4–2)	Hough (5–6)		22,040	44–28	Boxscore
73	June 26	Marlins	1–6	Gardner (2–2)	Martínez (6–5)	Nen (6)	26,875	44–29	Boxscore
74	June 27	Braves	7–2	Hill (11–3)	Maddux (10–4)		45,291	45–29	Boxscore
75	June 28	Braves	8–7	Rojas (3–2)	Bedrosian (0–1)		40,623	46–29	Boxscore
76	June 29	Braves	2–6	Smoltz (6–7)	Henry (4–1)		45,960	46–30	Boxscore
77	June 30	@ Giants	7–3	Fassero (6–5)	Torres (2–8)		16,399	47–30	Boxscore

July (18–8) (Home: 6–4; Road: 12–4)

#	Date	Opponent	Score	Win	Loss	Save	Attendance	Record	Report
78	July 1	@ Giants	7–14	Monteleone (2–2)	Heredia (4–3)		40,036	47–31	Boxscore
79	July 2	@ Giants	10–9	Hill (12–3)	Burba (0–5)	Wetteland (14)	22,617	48–31	Boxscore
80	July 3	@ Giants	5–8	Portugal (6–6)	Rueter (3–2)	Beck (15)	23,567	48–32	Boxscore
81	July 4	@ Dodgers	5–1	Henry (5–1)	Martínez (7–5)	Rojas (13)	54,859	49–32	Boxscore
82	July 5	@ Dodgers	1–2 (10 inn.)	Valdez (1–0)	Wetteland (2–6)		32,449	49–33	Boxscore
83	July 6	@ Dodgers	4–2	Scott (4–2)	Worrell (3–4)	Rojas (14)	37,741	50–33	Boxscore
84	July 7	@ Padres	7–0	Hill (13–3)	Ashby (4–7)		10,728	51–33	Boxscore
85	July 8	@ Padres	14–0	Rueter (4–2)	Benes (6–10)		14,386	52–33	Boxscore
86	July 9	@ Padres	5–1	Henry (6–1)	Sanders (3–6)		13,286	53–33	Boxscore
87	July 10	@ Padres	8–2	Fassero (7–5)	Hamilton (5–4)	Rojas (15)	15,848	54–33	Boxscore
All-Star Break: NL def. AL at Three Rivers Stadium, 8–7 (10)
88	July 14	Giants	3–8	Black (3–0)	Martínez (6–7)		36,026	54–34	Boxscore
89	July 15	Giants	3–7	Portugal (8–6)	Henry (6–2)		28,031	54–35	Boxscore
90	July 16	Giants	2–4	Burkett (6–7)	Hill (13–4)	Beck (19)	38,801	54–36	Boxscore
91	July 17	Giants	4–6	Van Landingham (5–1)	Fassero (7–6)	Beck (20)	28,245	54–37	Boxscore
92	July 18	Padres	9–2	Rueter (5–2)	Krueger (1–2)	Scott (1)	18,119	55–37	Boxscore
93	July 19	Padres	4–3	Martínez (7–7)	Ashby (4–9)	Wetteland (15)	23,773	56–37	Boxscore
94	July 20	Padres	5–2	Henry (7–2)	Benes (6–11)	Wetteland (16)	20,572	57–37	Boxscore
95	July 22	Dodgers	8–2	Hill (14–4)	Astacio (6–8)		32,253	58–37	Boxscore
96	July 23	Dodgers	2–0	Fassero (8–6)	Candiotti (7–5)	Wetteland (17)	35,831	59–37	Boxscore
97	July 24	Dodgers	7–4	Rueter (6–2)	Gross (7–7)	Wetteland (18)	34,402	60–37	Boxscore
98	July 25	@ Braves	6–4	Martínez (8–7)	Wohlers (7–2)	Wetteland (19)	43,596	61–37	Boxscore
99	July 26	@ Braves	5–3	Henry (8–2)	Maddux (13–6)	Wetteland (20)	49,324	62–37	Boxscore
100	July 27	@ Braves	1–4	Mercker (9–3)	Hill (14–5)	McMichael (20)	49,333	62–38	Boxscore
101	July 29	@ Marlins	8–4	Shaw (5–1)	Lewis (1–4)		39,338	63–38	Boxscore
102	July 30	@ Marlins	7–3	Scott (5–2)	Gardner (3–4)	Wetteland (21)	35,327	64–38	Boxscore
103	July 31	@ Marlins	13–4	Martínez (9–7)	Weathers (8–10)	White (1)	29,300	65–38	Boxscore

August (9–2) (Home: 3–1; Road: 6–1)

#	Date	Opponent	Score	Win	Loss	Save	Attendance	Record	Report
104	August 1	Cardinals	3–2 (10 inn.)	Wetteland (3–6)	Rodriguez (2–5)		30,359	66–38	Boxscore
105	August 2	Cardinals	5–4	Hill (15–5)	Urbani (2–7)	Wetteland (22)	37,533	67–38	Boxscore
106	August 3	Cardinals	8–3	Heredia (5–3)	Cormier (2–2)		30,541	68–38	Boxscore
107	August 4	Cardinals	3–7	Tewksbury (12–10)	Rueter (6–3)		39,044	68–39	Boxscore
108	August 5	@ Phillies	5–0	Martínez (10–7)	West (4–9)		33,642	69–39	Boxscore
109	August 6	@ Phillies	4–3 (11 inn.)	Wetteland (4–6)	Jones (2–4)	Shaw (1)	41,699	70–39	Boxscore
110	August 7	@ Phillies	6–4	Hill (16–5)	Muñoz (7–5)	Rojas (16)	45,346	71–39	Boxscore
111	August 8	@ Pirates	3–2	Heredia (6–3)	Cooke (4–11)	Wetteland (23)	16,722	72–39	Boxscore
112	August 9	@ Pirates	4–3	Rueter (7–3)	Lieber (6–7)	Wetteland (24)	18,183	73–39	Boxscore
113	August 10	@ Pirates	4–0	Martínez (11–7)	Neagle (9–10)	Wetteland (25)	15,690	74–39	Boxscore
114	August 11	@ Pirates	0–4	Smith (10–8)	Henry (8–3)		16,896	74–40	Boxscore

==== Games cancelled ====
1994 Games cancelled
August

#	Date	Opponent	Score	Win	Loss	Save	Attendance	Record	Report
	August 12	Mets	Cancelled (strike)						
	August 13	Mets	Cancelled (strike)						
	August 14	Mets	Cancelled (strike)						
	August 15	Rockies	Cancelled (strike)						
	August 16	Rockies	Cancelled (strike)						
	August 17	Rockies	Cancelled (strike)						
	August 19	@ Astros	Cancelled (strike)						
	August 20	@ Astros	Cancelled (strike)						
	August 21	@ Astros	Cancelled (strike)						
	August 22	@ Rockies	Cancelled (strike)						
	August 23	@ Rockies	Cancelled (strike)						
	August 24	@ Rockies	Cancelled (strike)						
	August 26	Astros	Cancelled (strike)						
	August 27	Astros	Cancelled (strike)						
	August 28	Astros	Cancelled (strike)						
	August 29	Cubs	Cancelled (strike)						
	August 30	Cubs	Cancelled (strike)						
	August 31	Cubs	Cancelled (strike)						

September

#	Date	Opponent	Score	Win	Loss	Save	Attendance	Record	Report
	September 2	Reds	Cancelled (strike)						
	September 3	Reds	Cancelled (strike)						
	September 4	Reds	Cancelled (strike)						
	September 5	@ Cubs	Cancelled (strike)						
	September 6	@ Cubs	Cancelled (strike)						
	September 7	@ Cubs	Cancelled (strike)						
	September 8	@ Cubs	Cancelled (strike)						
	September 9	@ Reds	Cancelled (strike)						
	September 10	@ Reds	Cancelled (strike)						
	September 11	@ Reds	Cancelled (strike)						
	September 12	@ Mets	Cancelled (strike)						
	September 13	@ Mets	Cancelled (strike)						
	September 14	@ Mets	Cancelled (strike)						
	September 16	Pirates	Cancelled (strike)						
	September 17	Pirates	Cancelled (strike)						
	September 18	Pirates	Cancelled (strike)						
	September 19	Phillies	Cancelled (strike)						
	September 20	Phillies	Cancelled (strike)						
	September 21	Phillies	Cancelled (strike)						
	September 22	Phillies	Cancelled (strike)						
	September 23	@ Cardinals	Cancelled (strike)						
	September 24	@ Cardinals	Cancelled (strike)						
	September 25	@ Cardinals	Cancelled (strike)						
	September 26	Marlins	Cancelled (strike)						
	September 27	Marlins	Cancelled (strike)						
	September 28	Marlins	Cancelled (strike)						
	September 29	Marlins	Cancelled (strike)						
	September 30	Braves	Cancelled (strike)						

October

#	Date	Opponent	Score	Win	Loss	Save	Attendance	Record	Report
	October 1	Braves	Cancelled (strike)						
	October 2	Braves	Cancelled (strike)						

Legend
Expos win	Expos loss	All-Star Game	Game postponed

=== Season standings ===
NL East
Team	W	L	Pct.	GB	Home	Road
Montreal Expos	74	40	.649	—	32‍–‍20	42‍–‍20
Atlanta Braves	68	46	.596	6	31‍–‍24	37‍–‍22
New York Mets	55	58	.487	18½	23‍–‍30	32‍–‍28
Philadelphia Phillies	54	61	.470	20½	34‍–‍26	20‍–‍35
Florida Marlins	51	64	.443	23½	25‍–‍34	26‍–‍30

Division leaders
Team	W	L	Pct.
Montreal Expos	74	40	.649
Cincinnati Reds	66	48	.579
Los Angeles Dodgers	58	56	.509

Wild Card team	W	L	Pct.	GB
Atlanta Braves	68	46	0.597	—
Houston Astros	66	49	0.574	2 1/2
New York Mets	55	58	0.487	12 1/2
San Francisco Giants	55	60	0.478	13 1/2
Philadelphia Phillies	54	61	0.470	14 1/2
St. Louis Cardinals	53	61	0.465	15
Pittsburgh Pirates	53	61	0.465	15
Colorado Rockies	53	64	0.453	16 1/2
Florida Marlins	51	64	0.444	17 1/2
Chicago Cubs	49	64	0.434	18 1/2
San Diego Padres	47	70	0.402	22 1/2

=== Record vs. opponents ===
1994 National League record Source: MLB Standings Grid – 1994
Team	ATL	CHC	CIN	COL	FLA	HOU	LAD	MON	NYM	PHI	PIT	SD	SF	STL
Atlanta	—	4–2	5–5	8–2	8–4	3–3	6–0	4–5	5–4	6–3	3–9	6–1	5–1	5–7
Chicago	2–4	—	5–7	6–6	4–5	4–8	3–3	2–4	1–4	1–6	5–5	6–3	5–4	5–5
Cincinnati	5–5	7–5	—	4–4	7–5	4–6	3–6	4–2	2–4	4–2	9–3	8–2	7–2	2–2–1
Colorado	2–8	6–6	4–4	—	3–9	5–5	4–6	4–2	5–1	2–4	2–3	5–5	3–7	8–4
Florida	4–8	5–4	5–7	9–3	—	2–4	3–3	2–7	6–4	4–6	1–6	5–1	2–4	3–7
Houston	3–3	8–4	6–4	5–5	4–2	—	1–8	2–4	3–3	5–1	8–4	5–5	8–2	8–4
Los Angeles	0–6	3–3	6–3	6–4	3–3	8–1	—	3–9	6–6	7–5	3–3	6–4	5–5	2–4
Montreal	5–4	4–2	2–4	2–4	7–2	4–2	9–3	—	4–3	5–4	8–2	12–0	5–7	7–3
New York	4–5	4–1	4–2	1–5	4–6	3–3	6–6	3–4	—	4–6	4–5	6–6	6–6	6–3
Philadelphia	3-6	6–1	2–4	4–2	6–4	1–5	5–7	4–5	6–4	—	5–4	4–8	4–8	4–3
Pittsburgh	9–3	5–5	3–9	3–2	6–1	4–8	3–3	2–8	5–4	4–5	—	3–3	1–5	5–5
San Diego	1–6	3–6	2–8	5–5	1–5	5–5	4–6	0–12	6–6	8–4	3–3	—	5–2	4–2
San Francisco	1–5	4–5	2–7	7–3	4–2	2–8	5–5	7–5	6–6	8–4	5–1	2–5	—	2–4
St. Louis	7–5	5–5	2–2–1	4–8	7–3	4–8	4–2	3–7	3–6	3–4	5–5	2–4	4–2	—

=== Notable transactions ===
- April 8, 1994: Juan Bell was signed as a free agent by the Expos.

=== Major League debuts ===
- Pitchers:
  - Joey Eischen (Jun 19)
  - Heath Haynes (Jun 1)
  - Rod Henderson (Apr 19)
  - Gabe White (May 27)

=== Roster ===
1994 Montreal Expos
Roster
Pitchers: 38 Denis Boucher; 48 Joey Eischen; 13 Jeff Fassero; 41 Heath Haynes; 20 Rod Henderson; 27 Butch Henry; 34 Gil Heredia; 44 Ken Hill; 35 Brian Looney; 37,45 Pedro Martínez; 51 Mel Rojas; 42 Kirk Rueter; 54 Tim Scott; 31 Jeff Shaw; 57 John Wetteland; 47 Gabe White	Catchers: 24 Darrin Fletcher; 2 Tim Spehr; 25 Lenny Webster; Infielders: 23 Juan Bell; 15 Freddie Benavides; 5 Sean Berry; 12 Wil Cordero; 30 Cliff Floyd; 4 Jeff Gardner; 3 Mike Lansing; 39 Randy Milligan	Outfielders: 18 Moisés Alou; 7 Lou Frazier; 9 Marquis Grissom; 33 Larry Walker; 22 Rondell White	Manager: 17 Felipe Alou; Coaches: 67 Pierre Arsenault (bullpen); 21 Tommy Harper (hitting); 1 Tim Johnson (bench); 45,? Joe Kerrigan (pitching); 6 Jerry Manuel (third base); ? Luis Pujols (first base)

== Player stats ==
= Indicates team leader

=== Batting ===
==== Starters by position ====
Note: Pos = Position; G = Games played; AB = At bats; H = Hits; Avg. = Batting average; HR = Home runs; RBI = Runs batted in

Pos	Player	G	AB	H	Avg.	HR	RBI
C	Darrin Fletcher	94	285	74	.260	10	57
1B	Cliff Floyd	100	334	94	.281	4	41
2B	Mike Lansing	106	394	105	.266	5	35
3B	Sean Berry	103	320	89	.278	11	41
SS	Wil Cordero	110	415	122	.294	15	63
CF	Marquis Grissom	110	475	137	.288	11	45
LF	Moisés Alou	107	422	143	.339	22	78
RF	Larry Walker	103	395	127	.322	19	86

==== Other batters ====
Note: G = Games played; AB = At bats; H = Hits; Avg. = Batting average; HR = Home runs; RBI = Runs batted in

Player	G	AB	H	Avg.	HR	RBI
Lenny Webster	57	143	39	.273	5	23
Lou Frazier	76	140	38	.271	0	14
Juan Bell	38	97	27	.278	2	10
Rondell White	40	97	27	.278	2	13
Freddie Benavides	47	85	16	.188	0	6
Randy Milligan	47	82	19	.232	2	12
Tim Spehr	52	36	9	.250	0	5
Jeff Gardner	18	32	7	.219	0	1

=== Pitching ===
==== Starting pitchers ====
Note: G = Games pitched; IP = Innings pitched; W = Wins; L = Losses; SV = Saves; ERA = Earned run average; SO = Strikeouts; BB = Walks allowed

Player	G	IP	W	L	SV	ERA	SO	BB
Ken Hill	23	154.2	16	5	0	3.32	85	44
Pedro Martínez	24	144.2	11	5	1	3.42	142	45
Jeff Fassero	21	138.2	8	6	0	2.99	119	40
Kirk Rueter	20	92.1	7	3	0	5.17	50	23

==== Other pitchers ====
Note: G = Games pitched; IP = Innings pitched; W = Wins; L = Losses; SV = Saves; ERA = Earned run average; SO = Strikeouts; BB = Walks allowed

Player	G	IP	W	L	SV	ERA	SO	BB
Butch Henry	24	107.1	8	3	0	2.43	70	20
Gabe White	7	23.2	1	1	1	6.08	17	11
Denis Boucher	10	18.2	0	1	0	6.75	17	7
Rod Henderson	3	6.2	0	1	0	9.45	3	7

==== Relief pitchers ====
Note: G = Games pitched; IP = Innings pitched; W = Wins; L = Losses; SV = Saves; ERA = Earned run average; SO = Strikeouts; BB = Walks allowed

Player	G	IP	W	L	SV	ERA	SO	BB
John Wetteland	52	63.2	4	6	25	2.83	68	21
Mel Rojas	58	84.0	3	2	16	3.32	84	21
Gil Heredia	39	75.1	6	3	0	3.46	62	13
Jeff Shaw	46	67.1	5	2	1	3.88	47	15
Tim Scott	40	53.1	5	2	1	2.70	37	18
Heath Haynes	4	3.2	0	0	0	0.00	1	3
Brian Looney	1	2.0	0	0	0	22.50	2	0
Joey Eischen	1	0.2	0	0	0	54.00	1	0

== Award winners ==
- Felipe Alou, Associated Press Manager of the Year
- Felipe Alou, The Sporting News Manager of the Year Award

== 65th Major League Baseball All-Star Game ==
All-Star Game

- Moisés Alou, National League outfield, reserve
- Wil Cordero, National League shortstop, reserve
- Darrin Fletcher, National League catcher, reserve
- Marquis Grissom, National League outfield, reserve
- Ken Hill, National League pitcher, reserve

== Farm system ==
Level	Team	League	Manager
AAA	Ottawa Lynx	International League	Jim Tracy
AA	Harrisburg Senators	Eastern League	Dave Jauss
A	West Palm Beach Expos	Florida State League	Rob Leary
A	Burlington Bees	Midwest League	Lorenzo Bundy
A-Short Season	Vermont Expos	New York–Penn League	Terry Kennedy
Rookie	GCL Expos	Gulf Coast League	Nelson Norman
