= 1994 Houston Astros season =

33rd season in Major League Baseball for the Houston Astros

1994 Houston Astros
- League: National League
- Division: Central
- Ballpark: The Astrodome
- City: Houston, Texas
- Record: 66–49 (.574)
- Divisional place: 2nd
- Owners: Drayton McLane, Jr.
- General managers: Bob Watson
- Managers: Terry Collins
- Television: KTXH
- Radio: KPRC (AM) (Bill Brown, Milo Hamilton, Larry Dierker, Vince Controneo, Bill Worrell, Enos Cabell); KXYZ (Francisco Ernesto Ruiz, Danny Gonzalez)

The 1994 Houston Astros season was the 33rd season for the Major League Baseball (MLB) franchise located in Houston, Texas, their 30th as the Astros, 33rd in the National League (NL), first in the inaugural season of the NL Central division, and 30th at The Astrodome. The Astros entered the season with an 85–77 record, third-place finish in the NL West division, and 19 games behind the three-time defending division-champion Atlanta Braves.

The 1994 season was the first for Terry Collins as manager, the 12th in franchise history, succeeding Art Howe. On April 4, pitcher Pete Harnisch made his second Opening Day start for the Astros, who hosted the Montreal Expos and prevailed on a walk-off double, 6–5, in extra innings. During the amateur draft, the Astros received three first round picks, including catcher Ramón Castro at 17th overall, pitcher Scott Elarton (25th), and shortstop Russ Johnson (30th).

Five Astros represented the club for the National League at the MLB All-Star Game: first baseman Jeff Bagwell, second baseman Craig Biggio, third baseman Ken Caminiti, and pitchers Doug Drabek and John Hudek. For Biggio, it was his third career selection, and the first for each of the remaining four. Former manager Leo Durocher, who led the Astros in 1972 and 1973, was inducted into the Baseball Hall of Fame.

The Astros finished the season with 66–49 record—just 1/2 game behind the first-place Cincinnati Reds—for their closest to first place since 1986. Houston also trailed Atlanta by 2 1/2 games for second place in MLB's first-ever Wild Card race. However, on August 12, all regular season games were suspended as a response to the players' strike, and the season was ultimately cancelled, removing nearly all of the final two months. The 1994 playoffs were cancelled as well, and the start of the 1995 season was delayed.

Prior to the strike, Bagwell set the major league record for fewest plate appearances to reach both 100 runs scored and 100 runs batted in (RBI)—leading the league in both categories (104 runs, 116 RBI). Bagwell also hit for the highest slugging percentage in the NL since 1925 (.750), ranked second in the NL in batting (.368), and third in home runs (39). Following the season, Bagwell became the fourth player to be unanimously selected for the NL Most Valuable Player (MVP) Award, and the first Astro to win an MVP. Bagwell and Biggio also became the first Astros to win both the Gold Glove and Silver Slugger Awards for their respective positions in the same season.

== Offseason ==
=== Summary ===
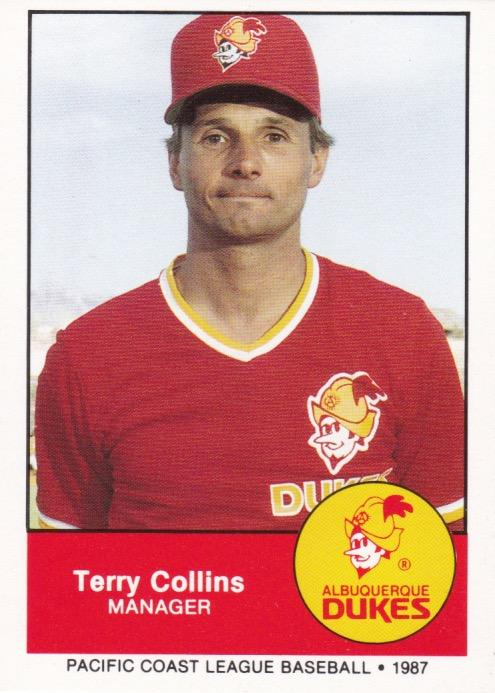
Manager Terry Collins depicted with the Albuquerque Dukes

The Astros concluded the 1993 season with a record of 85–77 (.525), for third place in the National League (NL) West division and 19 games trailing the division-champion Atlanta Braves. The Astros drew 2.084,618 fans at the Astrodome, their highest total since 1980 while winning 85 or more games for the fifth time.. The 1993 season was the final campaign in which the team sported the "tequila sunrise" rainbow uniforms, introduced in 1975, instead opting for a navy-and-gold color scheme. On September 8, 1993, Darryl Kile pitched the ninth no-hitter in team history.

Having been situated in the newly-established National League Central division, this signified that only team to have continuously remained as direct playoff competitors with Houston since their expansion in 1962 were the Cincinnati Reds. This alignment continued until 2013, when the Astros moved to the American League.

On November 17, 1993, Terry Collins was named as the 12th manager in Astros history, replacing Art Howe.

=== Transactions ===
- November 27, 1993: Xavier Hernandez was traded by the Astros to the New York Yankees for Andy Stankiewicz and Domingo Jean.
- December 2, 1993: Doug Jones and Jeff Juden were traded by Astros to the Philadelphia Phillies for Mitch Williams.
- December 10, 1993: Eric Anthony was traded by the Astros to the Seattle Mariners for Mike Felder and Mike Hampton.
- January 26, 1994: Sid Bream was signed as a free agent by the Astros.

== Regular season ==
=== Summary ===
==== April ====
Opening Day starting lineup
Uniform	Player	Position
18	James Mouton (Note: Major league debut.)	Right fielder
12	Steve Finley	Center fielder
7	Craig Biggio	Second baseman
5	Jeff Bagwell	First baseman
26	Luis Gonzalez	Left fielder
11	Ken Caminiti	Third baseman
9	Scott Servais	Catcher
17	Andújar Cedeño	Shortstop
27	Pete Harnisch	Pitcher
Venue: Astrodome • Houston 6, Montreal 5 Sources:

Right fielder James Mouton, who made his major league debut on Opening Day as Houston's leadoff hitter, also took the club's first at bat of the 1994 season, during which they hosted the Montreal Expos. Mouton pulled a ground ball double to left field off the Expos' Jeff Fassero for his first major league hit. The Expos struck first against the Astros' Opening Day starter, Pete Harnisch, during the top of the second, when Wil Cordero singled home Larry Walker, and two batters later, Sean Berry slugged a two-run home run that scored Cordero for a 3–0 Expos lead. In the bottom of the fourth, Andújar Cedeño singled home Luis Gonzalez for the Astros' first score of the season. Jeff Bagwell homered the following inning, which also scored Craig Biggio, for the Astros' first of the season, and tied the score, 3–3. The score remained tied 3–3 through regulation. During the bottom of the 12th, Mitch Williams issued consecutive bases-loaded bases on balls. Montreal regained the lead, 5–3, and Tom Edens replaced Williams, who secured the final out of the frame. In the bottom of the 12th, Bagwell singled home Mouton to trim the deficit to 5–4. Two batters later, Ken Caminiti doubled to center field to plate both Steve Finley and Bagwell for the Astros' walk-off victory, 6–5. Thus, Edens earned the Astros' first victory of the season. Mouton reached base four times in 6 plate appearances, including three hits and a walk, and also pilfered his first stolen base. Each of Finley, Biggio, Bagwell, and Cedeño added multi-hit games.

The Astros also debuted their new navy-and-gold uniforms with the leaning star logo on Opening Day.

On April 23, Mouton walloped a grand slam for his first major league home during the eighth inning at Busch Stadium, off Vicente Palacios. The blast capped a 15–5 Houston victory over the St. Louis Cardinals. Chris Donnels, Steve Finley, and Kevin Bass also went deep. Bass produced his second career five-hit game and tied his career high with four runs scored, while Finley logged his ninth career four-hit game. The Astros collected 18 hits and 9 walks, and to that point in the season, this was the team's high-scoring output, until June 24.

One week after scoring a season-high 15 runs, on April 30, the Astros buried the Cardinals by the same score, 15–5, this time at home. Bagwell and Finley both homered and doubled among four hits. Harnisch added two hits, his first double, and scored twice while cruising through six innings on the mound. It was Bagwell's seventh career four-hit game, and tenth for Finley. For the first time since 1966, single-game attendance topped 50,000.

==== May ====
On May 16, Bagwell hit for his first multi-home run game of the season, providing all of Houston's offense in a tight, 3–2 affair over the San Francisco Giants. In the top of the fifth, Matt Williams took Astros starter Shane Reynolds deep. Reynolds surrendered 10 hits and the Giants' only scores over 5 2/3 innings. With two outs and Giants on first and third in the sixth, Dave Veres (1–1), who had made his major league debut just six days earlier, entered for Reynolds and struck out Williams looking to extinguish the threat. In the bottom of the sixth, Bagwell yanked a home run deep with Biggio aboard to give Houston a 3–2 lead and make Veres a major league victor for the first time. Holds were earned by fellow rookie relievers Mike Hampton (3rd) and John Hudek (1st), while veteran Mitch Williams registered the save (5).

The May 16 contest posited as the second multi-home run game of Bagwell's career, with his first having occurred almost exactly two years prior on May 10, 1992. From May 16 until July 24, Bagwell connected for five multi-home run games.

While hurling an 8–0 shutout of the Atlanta Braves on May 24, starting pitcher Doug Drabek turned in an all-round game while going the distance on the mound. At the plate, Drabek matched the three hits surrendered by getting three of his own while collecting two runs batted in (RBI). Every Astro attained a hit as the team piled on 16 while coaxing another 5 bases on balls, while Mouton supplied a game-high four hits, the first four-hit game of his major league career.

For the month of May, Drabek furnished a 5–1 win–loss record (W–L), 1.65 earned run average (ERA) over six starts and 49 innings pitched, three complete games, two shutouts, and a 0.939 walks plus hits per inning pitched (WHIP). Consequently, he was singled out as NL Pitcher of the Month, the Astros' first since Darryl Kile during June of the preceding campaign.

==== June ====
In spite of stacking 11 hits on Greg Maddux on June 12 at the Astrodome, the Braves emerged as 3–1 victors. Maddux (10–1) got the complete game victory, issued no walks, induced three double plays, and surrendered just one extra base hit, a double to Bass. Meanwhile, Houston's own Greg, Swindell (5–3), earned a tough loss, allowing just two runs in eight innings.

On June 24, Jeff Bagwell hit three home runs against the Los Angeles Dodgers at the Astrodome—including twice during the sixth inning—to lead a 16–4 rout. Bagwell became the first Astro since Glenn Davis on June 1, 1990 to hit three home runs in one contest. (Note: Bagwell's was the fifth three-home run game by an Astro. He also blasted the next such performance by an Astro on April 21, 1999.) Bagwell's two longballs during the same inning tied a major league record. (Note: On April 29, 1974, Lee May became the first Houston Astro to connect for a home run twice in the same inning, and, on June 12, 2026, Yordan Alvarez succeeded Bagwell as the next Astro to achieve this distinction.) Bagwell also tied the club record with 13 total bases, first set by Joe Morgan on July 8, 1965. Nine of Houston's runs came in the sixth inning, and the 16 runs was a season-high for the Astros.

Bagwell was the NL Player of the Week for consecutive weeks on June 19 and June 26.

During the month of June, Bagwell logged a .394 batting average / .455 on-base percentage (OBP) / .899 slugging percentage (SLG) / 1.354 on-base plus slugging percentage (OPS). Over 26 games, he totaled 39 hits, scored 30 runs, 11 doubles, 13 home runs, 28 RBI and 89 total bases. This performance garnered NL Player of the Month honors for June, his second career monthly award. The prior Astro to win this award was himself, in May during the previous season. Bagwell joined Bob Watson (May 1975) and César Cedeño (September 1977) as Astros' two-time winners.

==== July ====
On July 3, Ken Caminiti became the fourth Astros player to connect for a home run from both sides of the plate, and first time in his career, (Note: Succeeded Alan Ashby on September 27, 1982, Mark Bailey on September 16, 1984, and Bass (thrice, on August 3, and September 2, 1987, and August 20, 1989).) accomplishing it in the Astrodome. Caminiti took righty Mike Morgan to deep right center in the third, and in the eighth, lefty Dan Plesac to deep right field. Kevin Bass, the previous Astro to hit a home run from each side of the plate in a single game, hit behind Caminiti (cleanup) in the order. Sid Bream, filling in for Bagwell at first, collected a season-high three hits. Biggio logged four hits, including a home run and double, as Houston won, 12–6, over the Chicago Cubs.

==== MLB All-Star Game ====
Five Astros players were named to the National League All-Star team: first baseman Jeff Bagwell, second baseman Craig Biggio, third baseman Ken Caminiti, and pitchers Doug Drabek and John Hudek. For Biggio, it was his third career selection, and the first for each of the remaining four. This was the first time that as many as five Astros were selected to the All-Star Game. Previously four Astros went to the 1979 and 1986 Midsummer Classics.

During the Midsummer Classic, Bagwell entered as a pinch hitter for Maddux, the NL starting pitcher. Bagwell singled off David Cone, and wound up collecting two hits in four at bats.

==== Rest of July ====
Finley cranked his first grand slam in an Astros uniform on July 17, igniting Houston for an eight-run third inning. The Astros whitewashed the Pittsburgh Pirates, 9–0. Shortstop Orlando Miller thumped his first triple among three hits. Shane Reynolds (7–4) took over for Drabek for seven shutout innings in relief for the victory. With Miller aboard in the third, it was Pittsburgh righty Paul Wagner's hit by pitch of Drabek while batting that knocked him out of the contest. Harnisch pinch ran for Drabek, and Biggio drew a walk. Finley then crushed a deep line drive to right field for the slam.

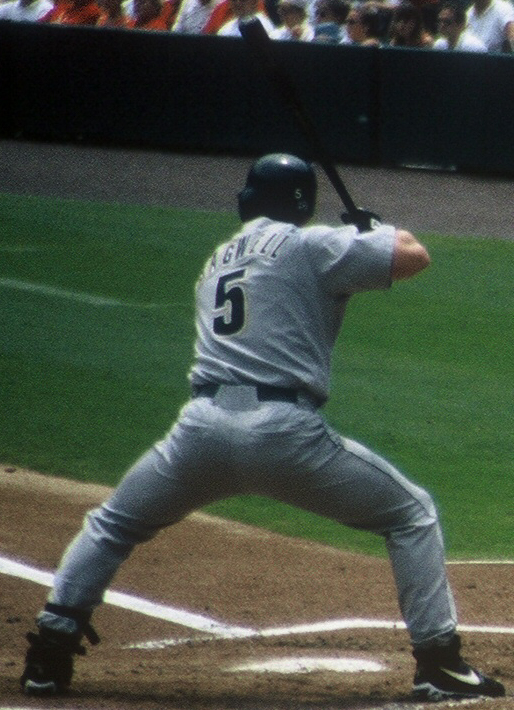
Jeff Bagwell at the plate in his unique batting stance.

The Astros mounted the greatest comeback in Astrodome history on July 18, responding to an eleven-run deficit, also tying a National League record. After three innings, St. Louis led Houston, 11–0. During the sixth inning, the Astros exploded for 11 runs. Mike Felder tripled in Andújar Cedeño to tie the contest, 11–11, and scored the go-ahead run when Kevin Bass singled to right field. This was Bass' second hit of the inning. Eleven consecutive Astros reached in the sixth as Houston jaunted to a 15–11 lead. Rookie Mike Hampton (2–1) spun two scoreless innings for the victory, a 15–12 final, setting up Todd Jones (3) for a three-inning save. The 11-run comeback equaled a National League record accomplished twice: first by the Cardinals, also surmounting an 11–0 lacuna to emerge 14-12 victors on June 15, 1952; and, the Philadelphia Phillies dispatched a 12-1 dearth to triumph, 18–16. on April 17, 1976.

However, the following day, July 19, Vicente Palacios tossed a one-hit, one-walk, eight-whiff shutout of Houston, for a game score of 92 to lead a 10–0 St. Louis victory.

From July 21 to August 9, Bagwell authored a career-high 18-game hitting streak, during which be hit .455.

On July 24, Biggio slugged his second career grand slam, during the fifth inning deep to left off Jon Lieber at the Astrodome. The Astros scored from the third to seventh inning consecutively on the way to a 13–1 win over Pittsburgh. Bagwell swatted two home runs in successive innings off Ravelo Manzanillo, driving in five runs or more for the second time on the season. Darryl Kile (7–5) cruised over eight innings for the win.

Bagwell became the first player in the majors to reach 100 RBI on July 27, including a home run off José Rijo in a 6–5 win over the Cincinnati Reds, agglomerating his total to 101 RBI in 101 games.

Veteran Sid Bream made his final major league appearance on July 27, collecting a single in a pinch-hit at bat against Cincinnati. Bream excelled as a left-handed pinch-hitting option and reserve first baseman during his lone season with Houston, batting .344 in 46 games and 70 plate appearances. Prior to Houston, he made key contribution to both the Pittsburgh Pirates' and Atlanta Braves' National League Championship Series bids.

Bagwell was recognized with a consecutive NL Player of the Month for July, the first Houston Astro to earn two monthly awards within the same season, and the first to win it three times. Over 24 contests, Bagwell batted at a season-high pace of .409 / .509 / .875 / 1.384 OPS. This totaled 27 runs scored, 36 hits, 8 doubles, 11 home runs, and 29 RBI. Bagwell became the first Astro since right-hander J. R. Richard was named NL Pitcher of the Month from September 1979 to April 1980 to earn any consecutive monthly honors.

Counting Drabek's Pitcher of the Month decoration for May, the month of July harbored a third successive monthly award for Houston players.

==== August ====
During a 12–4 win over the San Francisco Giants on August 5, Bagwell broke multiple Houston single-season club records, including home runs, total bases and RBI. With five RBI, Bagwell pumped his total to 112 to overtake Bob Watson's club record. (Note: Watson's record was 110 RBI in 1977.) Bagwell also cranked his 38th (Note: Surpassed Jimmy Wynn with 37 home runs in 1967.) home run, and his 69th extra-base hit tied the club record with one-third of the season remaining. (Note: Tied, and later surpassed, both Wynn (1967) and César Cedeño (1972).) With a .370 batting average, he was also lapping Rusty Staub's franchise record. (Note: Surpassed Staub's .333 average in 1967.)

On August 10, Bagwell sustained a fracture in on the left hand via an hit by pitch delivered by Andy Benes of the San Diego Padres, prematurely ending his season.

By Friday, August 12, the Astros had compiled a 66–49 (.574) record through 115 games. They trailed the Cincinnati Reds by a 1/2 game for the NL Central Division lead and the Atlanta Braves by 2 1/2 games in the NL Wild Card race when the season was interrupted by the players' strike. As the work stoppage prolonged, the date of August 12 would culminate as the final date of play in the Major Leagues for the 1994 season. All remaining games—including the playoffs—were later cancelled as a response to the players' strike.

==== Performance overview ====
The Astros improved from a third-place finish and 85–77 (.525) record in 1993, their final season in the NL West division, to a 66–49 (.574) record and second place in their first campaign in the NL Central in 1994, an increase in winning percentage by .049 points. It was the third consecutive year producing a winning percentage of .500 or better and third of 15 times over a span of 17 seasons through 2008, an era by far with the most consistency through that point in club history. This edition of the Astros commenced a string of seven consecutive showings each with both a winning record and finish no lower than second place in the NL Central division through 1999, both unprecedented achievements in franchise history.

Offensively, the Astros led the Majors in doubles during the strike-shortened season (252), intentional walks (58), and sacrifice hits (73). They had scored 602 runs (5.23 per game) and had allowed 503 runs (4.37 per game).

On the strength of nearly unrivalled productivity in major league history, Bagwell unanimously won the NL Most Valuable Player Award (MVP), becoming the fourth player in National League history on whom to be voted in this manner, and the first Astros player to win the award. Bagwell succeeded third baseman Mike Schmidt of the Philadelphia Phillies in 1980 to be voted unanimously as the National League winner.

Fellow "Killer B" Craig Biggio, who hit ahead of Bagwell in the order, led the league in doubles (44) and stolen bases (39). The third Astro to lead the league in doubles, Rusty Staub (1967) and César Cedeño (twice, 1971 and 1972), preceded Biggio. Further, Biggio became the first player in club history to lead the league in stolen bases.

As such, the pair were each lauded with both of the Silver Slugger and Gold Glove Awards, distinguishing them as the first Astros to claim both of the trophies for the same season. It was the first time since 1983 that Houston boasted multiple Silver Slugger recipients (José Cruz and Dickie Thon), and the first since 1974 with multiple Gold Glove defenders (César Cedeño and Doug Rader).

Biggio joined Cruz as the only multiple Silver Slugger winners for the Astros (at the time, two each), while becoming the first Astro to win the award for the position of second base. Biggio also had become Houston's first player to win the Silver Slugger at catcher in 1989. Bagwell, who received his first Silver Slugger, became the second player in club history to receive the award for first base, joining Glenn Davis in 1986. Both Bagwell and Biggio won the Gold Glove for the first time, as well as becoming the first players in club history to win at their respective positions.

In addition to the NL MVP Award, Bagwell received Player of the Year Awards from a number of media outlets, including The Sporting News, Associated Press (AP), Baseball Digest, and USA Today Baseball Weekly.

Bagwell finished the 1994 season playing in 110 games and batting .368 with a .750 SLG, 1.201 OPS, 39 HR, 116 RBI, 104 runs scored, 300 total bases and 213 adjusted OPS (OPS+) in 400 at-bats. He led the major leagues in SLG, OPS+, RBI, and total bases, and the NL in runs scored and OPS, but fell short of winning the batting Triple Crown, finishing second for the batting title to Tony Gwynn, who, after batting .394, had the highest average in the major leagues since Ted Williams in 1941. Bagwell finished second in HR to Matt Williams, who hit 43. Bagwell set the record for the fewest plate appearances in a season with at least 100 runs and RBI and became the first National Leaguer to finish first or second in batting average, home runs, RBI, and runs scored since Willie Mays in 1955. His .750 SLG at the time ranked as the seventh-best ever—it still ranks as the 11th best single-season mark in Major League history—and was the highest by a National Leaguer since Rogers Hornsby in 1925 (.756).

At the time, in National League history, the 213 OPS+ trailed only Hornsby's 1924 season (222 OPS+) for the second-highest ever; as of 2015, it was tied for 24th highest of all time in all major league seasons, and was the eighth highest among all not by Barry Bonds, Babe Ruth or Williams. Bagwell generated a .383 Isolated Power (ISO) mark, the 16th-highest in history. Twelve of the 15 higher seasons belonged to Bonds, Ruth, and Mark McGwire. Seven of the ten seasons that exceeded his .750 SLG belonged to Bonds and Ruth. Bagwell's 10.26 at bats per home run (AB/HR) ratio is the 25th-best in history. The 1.2009 OPS is the 20th-highest in history; 13 of the seasons that are higher belong to Bonds, Ruth and Williams. The 116 RBI in 110 games qualified for the 13th-highest ratio in history.

Projecting Bagwell's totals to 162 games and 650 plate appearances, he was on pace to amass 47 doubles, 57 home runs, 170 RBI, 22 stolen bases, 95 walks, 216 hits, along with .451 OBP, .750 SLG, and 1.201 OPS. When leading off an inning, he batted .460, .514 OBP, .990 SLG, 1.504 OPS, 14 HR, nine doubles and a triple. He also hit 23 home runs in 56 games at the Astrodome, setting a record that stood for the stadium that was famed to be pitcher-friendly until the Astros moved out following the 1999 season. Bagwell's other totals in the Astrodome that season included a .373 batting average, 54 runs scored, 58 RBI, .816 SLG and 1.275 OPS. In 125 plate appearances against left-handed pitching, he batted .457 with 20 BB, 18 HR and 11 doubles for a .544 OBP, 1.095 SLG and 1.639 OPS. He set single-season club records for batting average, SLG, OPS, OPS+, AB/HR, and offensive win percentage (.858), and also for home runs, breaking Wynn's 27-year-old record, and RBI, breaking Bob Watson's record he had set 17 years earlier – later which he again both subsequently broke.

=== Game log ===
1994 Regular Season Game Log (66-49) (Home: 37-22; Road: 29-27)
April (13-10) (Home: 7-5; Road: 6-5)

#	Date	Opponent	Score	Win	Loss	Save	Attendance	Record	Report
1	April 4	Expos	6-5 (12 inn.)	Edens (1-0)	Shaw (0-1)		43,440	1-0	Boxscore
2	April 5	Expos	1-5	Hill (1-0)	Drabek (0-1)		16,227	1-1	Boxscore
3	April 6	Expos	3-9	Rueter (1-0)	Kile (0-1)		17,180	1-2	Boxscore
4	April 8	Mets							
5	April 9	Mets							
6	April 10	Mets							
7	April 12	@ Marlins							
8	April 13	@ Marlins							
9	April 14	@ Marlins							
10	April 15	@ Mets							
11	April 16	@ Mets							
12	April 17	@ Mets							
13	April 19	@ Cubs							
14	April 20	@ Cubs							
15	April 22	@ Cardinals							
16	April 23	@ Cardinals							
17	April 24	@ Cardinals							
18	April 25	Pirates							
19	April 26	Pirates							
20	April 27	Cubs							
21	April 28	Cubs							
22	April 29	Cardinals							
23	April 30	Cardinals							

May (16-12) (Home: 8-5; Road: 8-7)

#	Date	Opponent	Score	Win	Loss	Save	Attendance	Record	Report
24	May 1	Cardinals							
25	May 3	@ Pirates							
26	May 4	@ Pirates							
27	May 5	@ Reds							
28	May 6	@ Reds							
29	May 7	@ Reds							
30	May 8	@ Reds							
31	May 9	@ Dodgers							
32	May 10	@ Dodgers							
33	May 11	@ Dodgers							
34	May 13	Rockies							
35	May 14	Rockies							
36	May 15	Rockies							
37	May 16	Giants							
38	May 17	Giants							
39	May 18	Giants							
40	May 19	Padres							
41	May 20	Padres							
42	May 21	Padres							
43	May 22	Padres							
44	May 24	@ Braves							
45	May 25	@ Braves							
46	May 26	@ Braves							
47	May 27	@ Phillies							
48	May 28	@ Phillies							
49	May 29	@ Phillies							
50	May 30	Marlins							
51	May 31	Marlins							

June (14-13) (Home: 8-6; Road: 6-7)

#	Date	Opponent	Score	Win	Loss	Save	Attendance	Record	Report
52	June 1	Marlins							
53	June 3	Phillies							
54	June 4	Phillies							
55	June 5	Phillies							
56	June 6	@ Expos	5-10	Henry (3-0)	Swindell (5-2)	Wetteland (8)	14,322	32-24	Boxscore
57	June 7	@ Expos	2-3	Heredia (2-2)	Veres (2-3)	Wetteland (9)	17,283	32-25	Boxscore
58	June 8	@ Expos	9-2	Williams (3-2)	Fassero (4-4)		17,289	33-25	Boxscore
59	June 10	Braves							
60	June 11	Braves							
61	June 12	Braves							
62	June 13	@ Giants							
63	June 14	@ Giants							
64	June 15	@ Giants							
65	June 16	@ Giants							
66	June 17	@ Padres							
67	June 18	@ Padres							
68	June 19	@ Padres							
69	June 20	@ Rockies							
70	June 21	@ Rockies							
71	June 22	@ Rockies							
72	June 24	Dodgers							
73	June 25	Dodgers							
74	June 26	Dodgers							
75	June 27	Reds							
76	June 28	Reds							
77	June 29	Reds							
78	June 30	Cubs							

July (16-11) (Home: 7-3; Road: 9-8)

#	Date	Opponent	Score	Win	Loss	Save	Attendance	Record	Report
79	July 1	Cubs							
80	July 2	Cubs							
81	July 3	Cubs							
82	July 4	@ Cardinals							
83	July 5	@ Cardinals							
84	July 6	@ Cardinals							
85	July 7	@ Cubs							
86	July 8	@ Cubs							
87	July 9	@ Cubs							
88	July 10	@ Cubs							
All-Star Break: NL def. AL at Three Rivers Stadium, 8–7 (10)
89	July 14	@ Pirates							
90	July 15	@ Pirates							
91	July 16	@ Pirates							
92	July 17	@ Pirates							
93	July 18	Cardinals							
94	July 19	Cardinals							
95	July 20	Cardinals							
96	July 21	Pirates							
97	July 22	Pirates							
98	July 23	Pirates							
99	July 24	Pirates							
100	July 25	@ Reds							
101	July 26	@ Reds							
102	July 27	@ Reds							
103	July 29	@ Dodgers							
104	July 30	@ Dodgers							
105	July 31	@ Dodgers							

August (7-3) (Home: 7-3)

#	Date	Opponent	Score	Win	Loss	Save	Attendance	Record	Report
106	August 1	Rockies							
107	August 2	Rockies							
108	August 3	Rockies							
109	August 4	Rockies							
110	August 5	Giants							
111	August 6	Giants							
112	August 7	Giants							
113	August 9	Padres							
114	August 10	Padres							
115	August 11	Padres							

Legend
Astros win	Astros loss	All-Star Game	Game postponed

=== League standings ===
==== National League Central ====
NL Central
Team	W	L	Pct.	GB	Home	Road
Cincinnati Reds	66	48	.579	—	37‍–‍22	29‍–‍26
Houston Astros	66	49	.574	½	37‍–‍22	29‍–‍27
Pittsburgh Pirates	53	61	.465	13	32‍–‍29	21‍–‍32
St. Louis Cardinals	53	61	.465	13	23‍–‍33	30‍–‍28
Chicago Cubs	49	64	.434	16½	20‍–‍39	29‍–‍25

==== National League Wild Card ====
NL Wild Card standings

Division leaders
Team	W	L	Pct.
Montreal Expos	74	40	.649
Cincinnati Reds	66	48	.579
Los Angeles Dodgers	58	56	.509

Wild Card team	W	L	Pct.	GB
Atlanta Braves	68	46	0.597	—
Houston Astros	66	49	0.574	2 1/2
New York Mets	55	58	0.487	12 1/2
San Francisco Giants	55	60	0.478	13 1/2
Philadelphia Phillies	54	61	0.470	14 1/2
St. Louis Cardinals	53	61	0.465	15
Pittsburgh Pirates	53	61	0.465	15
Colorado Rockies	53	64	0.453	16 1/2
Florida Marlins	51	64	0.444	17 1/2
Chicago Cubs	49	64	0.434	18 1/2
San Diego Padres	47	70	0.402	22 1/2

==== Record versus opponents ====
National League

1994 National League record Source: MLB Standings Grid – 1994
Team	ATL	CHC	CIN	COL	FLA	HOU	LAD	MON	NYM	PHI	PIT	SD	SF	STL
Atlanta	—	4–2	5–5	8–2	8–4	3–3	6–0	4–5	5–4	6–3	3–9	6–1	5–1	5–7
Chicago	2–4	—	5–7	6–6	4–5	4–8	3–3	2–4	1–4	1–6	5–5	6–3	5–4	5–5
Cincinnati	5–5	7–5	—	4–4	7–5	4–6	3–6	4–2	2–4	4–2	9–3	8–2	7–2	2–2–1
Colorado	2–8	6–6	4–4	—	3–9	5–5	4–6	4–2	5–1	2–4	2–3	5–5	3–7	8–4
Florida	4–8	5–4	5–7	9–3	—	2–4	3–3	2–7	6–4	4–6	1–6	5–1	2–4	3–7
Houston	3–3	8–4	6–4	5–5	4–2	—	1–8	2–4	3–3	5–1	8–4	5–5	8–2	8–4
Los Angeles	0–6	3–3	6–3	6–4	3–3	8–1	—	3–9	6–6	7–5	3–3	6–4	5–5	2–4
Montreal	5–4	4–2	2–4	2–4	7–2	4–2	9–3	—	4–3	5–4	8–2	12–0	5–7	7–3
New York	4–5	4–1	4–2	1–5	4–6	3–3	6–6	3–4	—	4–6	4–5	6–6	6–6	6–3
Philadelphia	3-6	6–1	2–4	4–2	6–4	1–5	5–7	4–5	6–4	—	5–4	4–8	4–8	4–3
Pittsburgh	9–3	5–5	3–9	3–2	6–1	4–8	3–3	2–8	5–4	4–5	—	3–3	1–5	5–5
San Diego	1–6	3–6	2–8	5–5	1–5	5–5	4–6	0–12	6–6	8–4	3–3	—	5–2	4–2
San Francisco	1–5	4–5	2–7	7–3	4–2	2–8	5–5	7–5	6–6	8–4	5–1	2–5	—	2–4
St. Louis	7–5	5–5	2–2–1	4–8	7–3	4–8	4–2	3–7	3–6	3–4	5–5	2–4	4–2	—

=== Notable transactions ===
- May 2, 1994: Mike Simms was signed as a free agent by the Astros.
- May 31, 1994: Mitch Williams was released by the Astros.

== Roster ==
1994 Houston Astros
Roster
Pitchers: 15 Doug Drabek; 46 Tom Edens; 38 Mike Hampton; 27 Pete Harnisch; 35 John Hudek; 59 Todd Jones; 57 Darryl Kile; 52 Ross Powell; 37 Shane Reynolds; 21 Greg Swindell; 43 Dave Veres; 53 Brian Williams; 99 Mitch Williams	Catchers: 20 Tony Eusebio; 9 Scott Servais; 6 Eddie Taubensee; Infielders: 5 Jeff Bagwell; 7 Craig Biggio; 31 Sid Bream; 11 Ken Caminiti; 10 Andújar Cedeño; 3 Chris Donnels; 24 Orlando Miller; 29 Roberto Petagine; 4 Andy Stankiewicz	Outfielders: 17 Kevin Bass; 28,51 Mike Felder; 12 Steve Finley; 26 Luis Gonzalez; 19 Brian Hunter; 18 James Mouton; 22 Mike Simms; 28 Milt Thompson	Manager: 2 Terry Collins; Coaches: 48 Matt Galante (third base); 55 Steve Henderson (hitting); 56 Ben Hines (first base); 1 Julio Linares (bench); 30 Mel Stottlemyre (pitching)

== Major League Baseball draft ==
Houston Astros 1994 MLB draft selections
Rd.	Slot	Draftee	Position	School	Origin	Signed	Notes	Bio
1	17	Ramón Castro	Catcher	Lino Padrón Rivera HS	(Puerto Rico)	Y	(Note: Became the first player to be drafted from Puerto Rico in the first round. Castro remained the highest-selected player drafted directly from high school in Puerto Rico until 2012, when Carlos Correa, also selected by Houston, became the first overall pick.) (Note: MLB debut on August 27, 1999, with the Florida Marlins)	
1	25	Scott Elarton	Right-handed pitcher	Lamar HS	(Colorado)	Y	(Note: Compensatory pick from the San Francisco Giants for signing free agent Mark Portugal.) (Note: MLB debut on June 20, 1998, with Houston)	
1	30	Russ Johnson	Shortstop	Louisiana State	(Louisiana)	Y	(Note: Supplemental pick for the loss of free agent Mark Portugal.) (Note: MLB debut on April 8, 1997, with Houston)	
3	80	Óscar Robles	Shortstop	Montgomery HS	(Mexico)	Y	(Note: MLB debut on May 10, 2005, with the Los Angeles Dodgers)	
4	108	Dan Lock	Left-handed pitcher	Yale	(Michigan)	Y		
5	136	Paul O'Malley	Right-handed pitcher	Illinois State	(Illinois)	Y		
7	192	Tony Mounce	Left-handed pitcher	Kamiakin High School	(California)	Y	(Note: MLB debut on June 13, 2003, with the Texas Rangers)	
43	1193	Julio Lugo	Shortstop	Connors State	(Dominican Republic)	Y	(Note: MLB debut on April 15, 2000, with Houston)	
93	1702	Mike Glavine	First baseman	Northeastern	(Massachusetts)	N	(Note: Signed with the Cleveland Indians from the 1995 draft.) (Note: MLB debut on September 14, 2003, with the New York Mets)	

== Player statistics ==
Table legend
*	Left-handed batter or pitcher	Team leader	League leader (Bold: MLB leader)
#	Switch hitter	Leader in appearances at position	League top ten

=== Batting ===
Abbreviations key

- ⌖ — primary position
- G — games played
- PA — plate appearances
- AB — at bats
- R — Runs
- H — hits
- 2B — doubles
- HR — home runs
- RBI — runs batted in
- BB — base on balls
- SB — stolen bases
- TB — total bases
- AVG — batting average
- OBP — on-base percentage
- SLG — slugging percentage
- OPS — on-base plus slugging

==== Starters by position ====
Individual batting results
⌖	Player	G	PA	AB	R	H	2B	3B	HR	RBI	SB	BB	SO	TB	AVG	OBP	SLG	OPS
C	Scott Servais	78	275	251	27	49	15	1	9	41	0	10	44	83	.195	.235	.371	.606
1B	Jeff Bagwell	110	479	400	104	147	32	2	39	**116**	15	65	65	**300**	.368	.451	**.750**	1.201
2B	Craig Biggio	114	511	437	88	139	44	5	6	56	39	62	58	211	.318	.411	.483	.893
3B	Ken Caminiti^{#}	111	454	406	63	115	28	0	18	75	4	43	71	201	.283	.352	.495	.847
SS	Andújar Cedeño	98	380	342	38	90	26	0	9	49	1	29	79	92	.263	.334	.418	.752
LF	Luis Gonzalez*	112	450	392	57	107	29	4	8	67	15	49	57	168	.273	.353	.429	.782
CF	Steve Finley*	94	417	373	64	103	16	5	11	33	13	28	52	162	.276	.329	.434	.764
RF	James Mouton	99	345	310	43	76	11	0	2	16	24	27	69	93	.245	.315	.300	.615

==== Other batters ====
Individual batting results
Player	G	AB	H	Avg.	HR	RBI
Kevin Bass^{#}	82	203	63	.310	6	35
Tony Eusebio	55	159	47	.296	5	30
Mike Felder^{#}	58	117	28	.239	0	13
Chris Donnels*	54	86	23	.267	3	5
Sid Bream*	46	61	21	.344	0	7
Andy Stankiewicz	37	54	14	.259	1	5
Orlando Miller	16	40	13	.325	2	9
Brian Hunter	6	24	6	.250	0	0
Milt Thompson*	9	21	6	.286	1	3
Mike Simms	6	12	1	.083	0	0
Ed Taubensee	5	10	1	.100	0	0
Roberto Petagine*	8	7	0	.000	0	0

=== Pitching ===
Abbreviations

- W — wins
- L — losses
- ERA — earned run average
- G — games pitched
- GS — games started
- CG — complete games
- ShO — shutouts
- SV — saves
- IP — innings pitched
- SO — strikeouts

==== Starting pitchers ====
Individual pitching results
Player	W	L	ERA	G	GS	CG	ShO	IP	SO
Doug Drabek	12	6	2.84	23	23	6	2	164.2	121
Greg Swindell*	8	9	4.37	24	24	1	0	148.1	74
Darryl Kile	9	6	4.57	24	24	0	0	147.2	105
Pete Harnisch	8	5	5.40	17	17	1	0	95.0	62

==== Other pitchers ====
Player	W	L	ERA	G	GS	CG	ShO	IP	SO
Shane Reynolds	8	5	3.05	33	14	1	1	124.0	110
Brian Williams	6	5	5.74	20	13	0	0	78.1	49

==== Relief pitchers ====
Player	G	W	L	SV	ERA	SO
John Hudek	42	0	2	16	2.97	34
Todd Jones	48	5	2	5	2.72	63
Mike Hampton*	44	2	1	0	3.70	24
Tom Edens	39	4	1	1	4.50	38
Dave Veres	32	3	3	1	2.41	28
Mitch Williams*	25	1	4	6	7.65	21
Ross Powell	12	0	0	0	1.23	5

== Awards and achievements ==
=== Offensive achievements ===
==== Grand slams ====
Former Astros manager Leo Durocher in 1973

No.	Date	Astros batter	Venue	Inning	Pitcher	Opposing team	Box
1	April 23	James Mouton (Note: 1st MLB home run)	Busch Stadium	8	Vicente Palacios	St. Louis Cardinals	
2	July 17	Steve Finley	Three Rivers Stadium	3 (Note: Tied score or took lead)	Paul Wagner	Pittsburgh Pirates	
3	July 24	Craig Biggio	Astrodome	5	Jon Lieber	Pittsburgh Pirates	

==== Franchise records ====
- Adjusted on-base plus slugging (OPS+): Jeff Bagwell (213)
- Batting average: Jeff Bagwell (.368)
- Home runs hit at home: Jeff Bagwell (23)
- On-base plus slugging percentage (OPS): Jeff Bagwell (1.201)

=== Career honors ===
Astros elected to Baseball Hall of Fame
Individual	Role	Houston Astros career					Induction	
Individual	Role	Uni.	Seasons	Games	Start	Finish	Induction	
Leo Durocher	Manager	2	2	193	1972	1973	Class	Plaque
See also: Members of the Baseball Hall of Fame • Sources:

=== Awards ===
1994 Houston Astros award winners
Name of award			Recipient	Ref.
Associated Press (AP) All-Star		First baseman	Jeff Bagwell	
Baseball Digest	Player of the Year		Jeff Bagwell	
Baseball Digest	Rookie All-Star	Relief pitcher	John Hudek	
Fred Hartman Award for Long and Meritorious Service to Baseball			Billy Joe Bowman	
Gold Glove Award		First baseman	Jeff Bagwell	
Gold Glove Award		Second baseman	Craig Biggio	
Houston-Area Major League Player of the Year		NYY	Andy Pettitte	
Houston Astros		Most Valuable Player (MVP)	Jeff Bagwell	
Houston Astros		Rookie of the Year (Note: Premier year for this award.)	John Hudek	
MLB All-Star Game		Home Run Derby contestant	Jeff Bagwell	
MLB All-Star Game		Reserve first baseman	Jeff Bagwell	
MLB All-Star Game		Reserve second baseman	Craig Biggio	
MLB All-Star Game		Reserve third baseman	Ken Caminiti	
MLB All-Star Game		Reserve pitcher	Doug Drabek	
MLB All-Star Game		Reserve pitcher	John Hudek	
National League (NL) Most Valuable Player Award (MVP)			Jeff Bagwell	
National League (NL) Pitcher of the Month		May	Doug Drabek	
National League (NL) Player of the Month		June	Jeff Bagwell	
National League (NL) Player of the Month		July	Jeff Bagwell	
National League (NL) Player of the Week		June 19	Jeff Bagwell	
National League (NL) Player of the Week		June 26	Jeff Bagwell	
National League (NL) Player of the Week		July 24	Jeff Bagwell	
Players Choice Awards		NL Outstanding Player	Jeff Bagwell	
Silver Slugger Award		First baseman	Jeff Bagwell	
Silver Slugger Award		Second baseman	Craig Biggio	
The Sporting News	MLB Player of the Year		Jeff Bagwell	
The Sporting News	NL All-Star	First baseman	Jeff Bagwell	
The Sporting News	NL All-Star	Second baseman	Craig Biggio	

Other awards results

Name of award	Voting recipient(s) (Team)	Ref.
NL Cy Young Award	1st—Maddux (ATL) • 4th—Drabek (HOU)	
NL Most Valuable Player	1st—Bagwell (HOU) • 16th—Biggio (HOU)	
NL Manager of the Year	1st—Alou (MON) • 3rd—Collins (HOU)	
NL Rookie of the Year	1st—Mondesí (LAD) • 2nd—Hudek (HOU); 11th—Reynolds (HOU)	

=== League leaders ===
NL batting leaders

- Adjusted on-base plus slugging (OPS+): Jeff Bagwell (213)
- Doubles: Craig Biggio (44)
- On-base plus slugging (OPS): Jeff Bagwell (1.201)
- Runs batted in (RBI): Jeff Bagwell (116)
- Runs scored: Jeff Bagwell (104)
- Slugging percentage (SLG): Jeff Bagwell (.750)
- Stolen bases: Craig Biggio (39)
- Total bases: Jeff Bagwell (300)

NL pitching leaders

- Bases on balls allowed: Darryl Kile (82)
- Wild pitches: Darryl Kile (10)

NL fielding leaders

- Errors: Andújar Cedeño (23)

== Minor league system ==
Level	Team	League	Manager
AAA	Tucson Toros	Pacific Coast League	Rick Sweet
AA	Jackson Generals	Texas League	Sal Butera
A	Osceola Astros	Florida State League	Tim Tolman
A	Quad Cities River Bandits	Midwest League	Steve Dillard
A-Short Season	Auburn Astros	New York–Penn League	Manny Acta
Rookie	GCL Astros	Gulf Coast League	Bobby Ramos

LEAGUE CHAMPIONS: GCL Astros

Awards

- Baseball America First Team Minor League All-Star—Outfielder: Brian L. Hunter
- Houston Astros Minor League Player of the Year: Brian L. Hunter
- Pacific Coast League All-Star—Outfielder: Brian L. Hunter
- Pacific Coast League Manager of the Year: Rick Sweet
- Triple-A All-Star—Outfielder: Brian L. Hunter

== See also ==
- List of Major League Baseball annual doubles leaders
- List of Major League Baseball annual fielding errors leaders
- List of Major League Baseball annual runs batted in leaders
- List of Major League Baseball annual runs scored leaders
- List of Major League Baseball annual stolen base leaders
- List of Major League Baseball single-inning home run leaders
- List of National League annual slugging percentage leaders
