= Marquis Grissom =

American baseball player (born 1967)

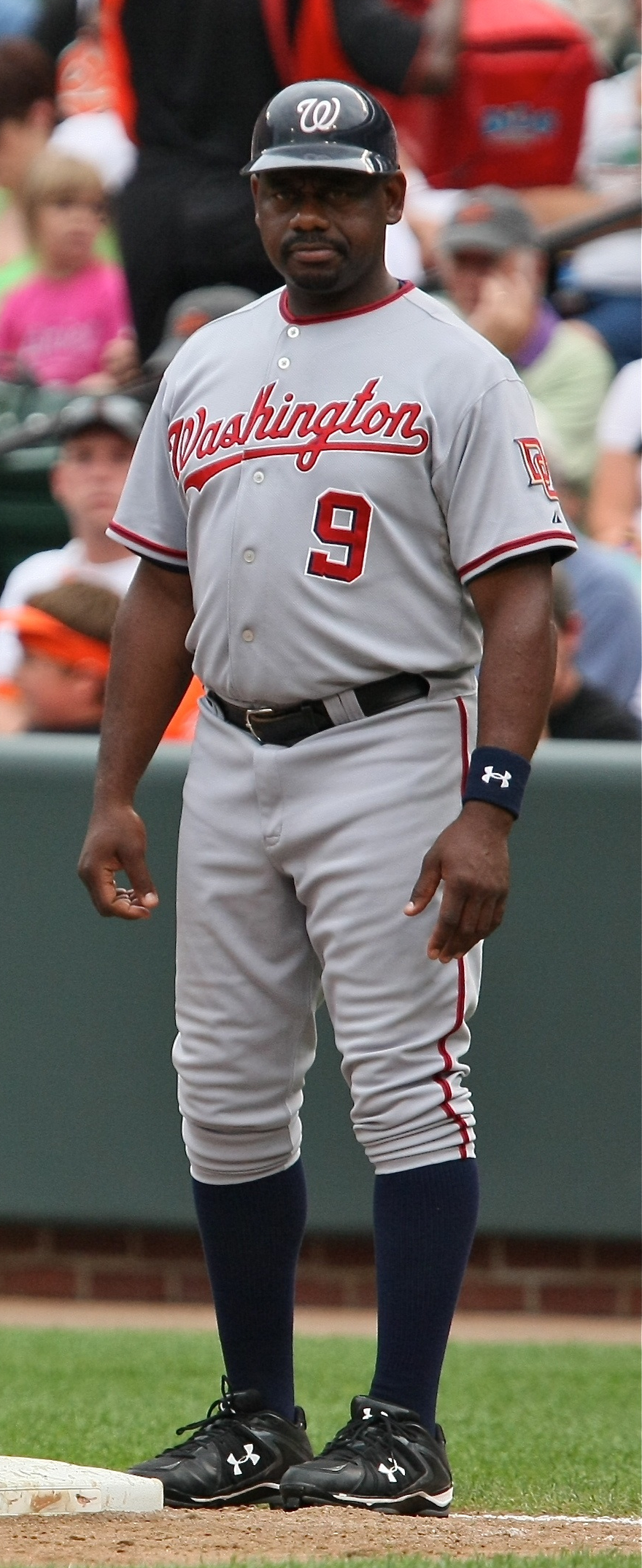
- Grissom as a coach for the Washington Nationals in 2009
- Center fielder
- Born: April 17, 1967 (age 59); Atlanta, Georgia, U.S.
- Batted: Right Threw: Right

MLB debut
- August 22, 1989, for the Montreal Expos

Last MLB appearance
- July 31, 2005, for the San Francisco Giants

MLB statistics
- Batting average: .272
- Hits: 2,251
- Home runs: 227
- Runs batted in: 967
- Stolen bases: 429
- Stats at Baseball Reference

Teams
- As player: Montreal Expos (1989–1994); Atlanta Braves (1995–1996); Cleveland Indians (1997); Milwaukee Brewers (1998–2000); Los Angeles Dodgers (2001–2002); San Francisco Giants (2003–2005); As coach: Washington Nationals (2009)

Career highlights and awards
- 2× All-Star (1993, 1994); World Series champion (1995); ALCS MVP (1997); 4× Gold Glove Award (1993–1996); 2× NL stolen base leader (1991, 1992)

Marquis Deon Grissom (born April 17, 1967) is an American former professional baseball center fielder. He played in Major League Baseball (MLB) for the Montreal Expos, Atlanta Braves, Cleveland Indians, Milwaukee Brewers, Los Angeles Dodgers, and San Francisco Giants between 1989 and 2005.

With the Expos, Grissom led the National League (NL) in stolen bases in 1991 and 1992, and represented the NL in the MLB All-Star Game in 1993 and 1994. He won the 1995 World Series as a member of the Braves. Grissom won four consecutive Gold Glove Awards from 1993 to 1996.

== Early life and amateur career ==
Grissom was born in Atlanta, Georgia, the second-youngest of sixteen children of Marion and Julia Grissom. Grissom was one of fifteen children who survived infancy. He grew up in Red Oak, Georgia, in a house which his father built from scratch while working on the assembly line at the Atlanta Assembly, a Ford plant. Grissom could not afford to play organized baseball in early childhood. When Grissom was 8 or 10 years old, he struck a police officer's Cadillac with a rock thrown from a great distance. The officer, who was impressed by the throw, agreed not to charge Grissom if later he would join his youth baseball team.

Grissom attended Lakeshore High School in College Park. He was offered college scholarships in baseball, football and track and field.

Grissom played baseball at Florida A&M University as a pitcher and outfielder. He played two seasons with the Rattlers in 1987 and 1988 during which time he posted a .408 batting average. In 1988, he scored more runs per game and hit more triples per game than any other player in Division I. He was named the Most Outstanding Player of that season's Mid-Eastern Athletic Conference (MEAC) baseball tournament after pitching two complete games and maintaining a .643 batting average. He was inducted into the MEAC Hall of Fame in 2014.

== Baseball career ==
=== Montreal Expos ===
The Montreal Expos selected Grissom with the 76th overall pick in the 1988 MLB draft, as part of that draft's third round. He had been considered a prospect as both a pitcher and an outfielder, but the Expos decided to have him work solely as a position player. He made his professional debut with the Jamestown Expos of the New York–Penn League that fall and advanced quickly through the system, first appearing in the majors on August 22, 1989. He showed steady improvement for the next few seasons, gradually developing into a star as Montreal's leadoff hitter and center fielder. He led the National League in stolen bases in 1991 and 1992, was a member of the NL All-Star team in 1993 and 1994, and won four consecutive Gold Gloves, the first coming in 1993.

Against the Los Angeles Dodgers on July 28, 1991, Grissom caught Chris Gwynn's fly ball for the final out of Dennis Martínez's perfect game.

=== Atlanta Braves ===
The Expos enjoyed success on the field, but a strike ended the 1994 season before the playoffs, and after baseball resumed the team was forced to trade many of their stars for financial reasons. Grissom was the last of the three highest-paid Expos players at the time to be traded when he was acquired by the Atlanta Braves for Tony Tarasco, Roberto Kelly and Esteban Yan on April 6, 1995. The Braves beat out the Florida Marlins and Boston Red Sox to land the deal. The Braves were just beginning a run of dominance in the NL East, and in his first season in Atlanta, they won the World Series with Marquis (the only player on that Braves team who actually was born and raised in Atlanta) securing the final out by catching a fly ball by Carlos Baerga. They returned to the Fall Classic the next season, but failed to defend their title against the New York Yankees.

=== Cleveland Indians ===
Teams' financial motivations continued to affect the course of Grissom's career, and in March 1997, he was involved in a blockbuster trade with the Cleveland Indians. Hoping to save money that had been committed to long-term contracts, Atlanta traded Grissom and two-time All-Star David Justice to the Indians, receiving in return three-time All-Star Kenny Lofton and setup man Alan Embree. The deal worked out well for Cleveland, as the team went all the way to the World Series, ultimately losing to the Florida Marlins in seven games. Grissom performed exceptionally well in that postseason, winning the MVP award in the ALCS, and completing a 15-game World Series consecutive game hitting streak spanning 3 World Series, the 2nd longest of all time next to Hank Bauer of the New York Yankees.

=== Later career ===
That offseason, however, the Indians re-signed Lofton as a free agent, subsequently trading Grissom and pitcher Jeff Juden to the Milwaukee Brewers for pitchers Ben McDonald, Ron Villone, and Mike Fetters. Grissom's production declined as he spent three seasons with the struggling club, and a trade in the spring of 2001 made him a Los Angeles Dodger, sending Devon White to the Brewers in return. Grissom continued to struggle that year, but he enjoyed a strong bounce-back season as a part-time player in 2002. On September 16, 2002, the Dodgers had a crucial game against the San Francisco Giants. In the top of the 9th inning, he robbed Rich Aurilia of a potential game-tying home run to protect the 7–6 victory. The Giants went on to make the playoffs and the Dodgers did not. As a free agent he subsequently attracted the attention of the San Francisco Giants, who had just been defeated in the World Series. San Francisco signed Grissom, and he enjoyed two more productive seasons as their starting center fielder. The Giants were successful as well, winning the NL West in 2003 and missing the wild card by one game in 2004. Marquis won the 2003 Willie Mac Award for his spirit and leadership. On April 8, 2004, Grissom hit the first home run ever at San Diego's Petco Park. Grissom's production dipped again in 2005, and in a season of struggles by the Giants, he was released. On January 3, 2006, the Chicago Cubs signed him to a minor league contract and invited him to spring training as a non-roster player.

==== Retirement ====
On March 28, 2006, Grissom retired after a 17-year career. He told The Atlanta Journal-Constitution that he knew it was time for him to retire when he began spending more time preparing for games than playing in the games themselves.

In 2011, Grissom received four votes in Baseball Hall of Fame balloting.

=== Coaching career ===
Following his retirement, Grissom became a youth baseball coach. Among other Atlanta-area prospects, Grissom worked with family friend Michael Harris II from his youth through his early professional career. When Harris won the 2022 National League Rookie of the Year Award, he dedicated it to Grissom.

Grissom was hired to become the Washington Nationals first base coach for the 2009 season on October 24, 2008. In November 2009, he was replaced on the coaching staff by Dan Radison.

== Personal life ==
As of 2024, Grissom lives with his wife, Sharron, in Fayetteville and Sandy Springs, Georgia. He has five children.

During his playing career, Grissom bought houses for his parents and each of his 14 siblings.

Grissom's younger brother, Antonio, played in the farm systems of the Expos and Philadelphia Phillies. Grissom's son Marquis Jr. pitched for Georgia Tech and in the Washington Nationals minor league system, after he was drafted in the 2022 MLB draft. While in the Nationals organization, Marquis Jr. participated in the All-Star Futures Game in 2025 as a reliever.

One year after retiring, Grissom founded the Marquis Grissom Baseball Association, a nonprofit which helps underprivileged youths in the Atlanta area play baseball.

== See also ==
- List of Major League Baseball career home run leaders
- List of Major League Baseball career hits leaders
- List of Major League Baseball career runs scored leaders
- List of Major League Baseball annual stolen base leaders
- List of Major League Baseball career stolen bases leaders
