= Darrin Fletcher =

American baseball player (born 1966)

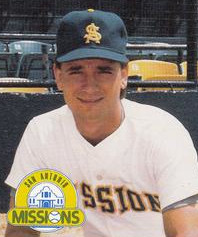
- Fletcher in 1988
- Catcher
- Born: October 3, 1966 (age 59); Elmhurst, Illinois, U.S.
- Batted: Left Threw: Right

MLB debut
- September 10, 1989, for the Los Angeles Dodgers

Last MLB appearance
- July 16, 2002, for the Toronto Blue Jays

MLB statistics
- Batting average: .269
- Home runs: 124
- Runs batted in: 583
- Stats at Baseball Reference

Teams
- Los Angeles Dodgers (1989–1990); Philadelphia Phillies (1990–1991); Montreal Expos (1992–1997); Toronto Blue Jays (1998–2002)

Career highlights and awards
- All-Star (1994)

Darrin Glen Fletcher (born October 3, 1966) is an American former professional baseball catcher and sports commentator. He played in Major League Baseball (MLB) from 1989 to 2002 for the Los Angeles Dodgers, Philadelphia Phillies, Montreal Expos, and Toronto Blue Jays.

== Amateur career ==
A native of Oakwood, Illinois, Fletcher played college baseball at the University of Illinois. In 1986, he played collegiate summer baseball with the Chatham A's of the Cape Cod Baseball League. He was selected by the Los Angeles Dodgers in the 6th round of the 1987 Major League Baseball draft.

== Professional career ==
After only two seasons in the minor leagues, Fletcher made his major league debut with the Dodgers on September 10, 1989 at the age of 22. He saw limited playing time the following season as a back-up catcher to Mike Scioscia. On September 13, 1990, Fletcher was traded to the Philadelphia Phillies for Dennis Cook, and then was traded to the Montreal Expos for Barry Jones on December 9, 1991.

In Montreal, Fletcher became a fixture in the lineup, regularly playing in over 100 games a year, and helping the Expos to two consecutive second place finishes in the National League Eastern Division in 1992 and 1993. In 1994, the Expos had the best record in baseball and were poised to win the division when, the 1994–95 Major League Baseball strike stopped the season on August 11. Fletcher helped to guide the 1994 Expos pitching staff to lead the league in winning percentage and in earned run average (ERA) and tied for the league lead in shutouts with 8. That year he was named as a reserve player for the National League team in the 1994 All-Star Game.

Fletcher signed as a free agent with the Toronto Blue Jays on November 26, 1997. With Toronto, he had some of his finest seasons. In 1999, he batted .291 with 18 home runs and 80 runs batted in (RBI) (a career high) and in 2000 he had his first .300 season, batting .320 with 20 home runs (a career high) and 58 RBI. On August 27 of that year he hit three home runs in a game against the Texas Rangers. Fletcher's home runs made him one of seven Blue Jays to hit 20 or more that season, helping Toronto tie a record set by the 1996 Baltimore Orioles.

After these career highs, however, Fletcher struggled through the 2001 season and played in his final major league game on July 16, 2002 at the age of 35.

== Career statistics ==
In a fourteen-year major league career, Fletcher played in 1,245 games, accumulating 1,048 hits in 3,902 at bats for a .269 career batting average along with 124 home runs, 583 RBI, and an on-base percentage of .318. Fletcher had a career fielding percentage of .993, ranking him 32nd all-time among major league catchers.

Fletcher was the Phillies catcher on May 23, 1991, when Tommy Greene pitched a no-hitter against the Montreal Expos.

== Life after baseball ==
Fletcher is the son of former major league player, Tom Fletcher, and the grandson of long-time minor league player Glenn Fletcher. His son, Casey Fletcher, was the 2010 Danville Commercial-News baseball Player of the Year. In 2012, Casey played a season with the Danville Dans, a Prospect League team after graduating in 2011 from Oakwood High School in Oakwood, Illinois. Casey played for Kankakee Community College before transferring to the University of Illinois at Urbana–Champaign as a junior for the 2014 season.

Fletcher has done occasional color commentary for the Montreal Expos on The Score and the Toronto Blue Jays on Rogers Sportsnet.

== See also ==
- List of second-generation Major League Baseball players
