= Mike Felder =

American baseball player (born 1961)

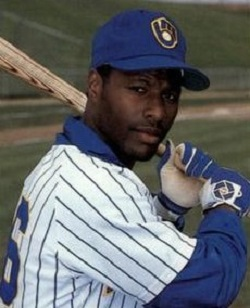
- Outfielder
- Born: November 18, 1961 (age 64); Vallejo, California, U.S.
- Batted: Switch Threw: Right

MLB debut
- September 11, 1985, for the Milwaukee Brewers

Last MLB appearance
- August 11, 1994, for the Houston Astros

MLB statistics
- Batting average: .249
- Home runs: 14
- Runs batted in: 173
- Stats at Baseball Reference

Teams
- Milwaukee Brewers (1985–1990); San Francisco Giants (1991–1992); Seattle Mariners (1993); Houston Astros (1994)

Michael Otis Felder (born November 18, 1961) is an American former professional baseball player who played in the major leagues from 1985-1994. He played for the Milwaukee Brewers, San Francisco Giants, Seattle Mariners and Houston Astros of Major League Baseball (MLB). At just 5-feet 8-inches and a 160 lb. playing weight, the diminutive outfielder was nicknamed "Tiny".

== Career ==
Felder was drafted by the Milwaukee Brewers in the third round of the 1981 Major League Baseball draft.

He was signed as a free agent by the San Francisco Giants on April 5, 1991. He won the 1992 Willie Mac Award honoring his spirit and leadership.

He was signed as a free agent by the Seattle Mariners on November 29, 1992. He was traded by the Mariners with Mike Hampton to the Houston Astros for Eric Anthony on December 10, 1993.

Felder also played one season in the Mexican Pacific League with the Yaquis de Obregón.

== See also ==
- List of Major League Baseball career stolen bases leaders
