= James Mouton =

American baseball player (born 1968)

- Outfielder
- Born: December 29, 1968 (age 57); Denver, Colorado, U.S.
- Batted: Right Threw: Right

MLB debut
- April 4, 1994, for the Houston Astros

Last MLB appearance
- October 7, 2001, for the Milwaukee Brewers

MLB statistics
- Batting average: .246
- Home runs: 18
- Runs batted in: 147
- Stats at Baseball Reference

Teams
- Houston Astros (1994–1997); San Diego Padres (1998); Montreal Expos (1999); Milwaukee Brewers (2000–2001)

James Raleigh Mouton (born December 29, 1968) is an American former professional baseball player. An outfielder, he played all or parts of eight seasons in Major League Baseball, from 1994 until 2001, for the Houston Astros, San Diego Padres, Montreal Expos and Milwaukee Brewers.

== Early career ==
Mouton was drafted by the Astros in the 7th round of the 1991 Major League Baseball draft, as a second baseman. He advanced rapidly through their farm system, and was playing at Triple-A with the Tucson Toros by 1993. That year, he won the Pacific Coast League Most Valuable Player Award after batting .315 with 16 home runs, 92 RBI, and 40 stolen bases.

== Major league career ==
=== Astros ===
In 1994, Mouton made his major league debut as the Astros' Opening Day right fielder and leadoff hitter. Although he had never played the outfield in the minor leagues, he fielded reasonably well, finishing 7th in the National League in defensive Wins above replacement. He played in every game that season until the 1994-95 strike ended the season in August, appearing at all three outfield positions. He also finished 10th in the NL in stolen bases with 24.

During the next two seasons, Mouton continued to play semi-regularly for the Astros, playing in over 100 games each year. His statistics remained fairly consistent, batting .262 with 4 home runs, 27 RBI and 25 stolen bases in 1995, and batting .263 with 3 home runs, 34 RBI and 21 stolen bases in 1996. In 1997, however, his batting average dipped to .211, and he managed just 9 steals in 80 games. He was traded during the offseason to the Padres for pitcher Sean Bergman.

=== Remaining career ===
Mouton split the 1998 season between the major league Padres and their top farm club, the Las Vegas Stars. Although he hit .354 in the minors, Mouton hit just .190 with San Diego, and was allowed to become a free agent after the season. Mouton signed with the Expos, spending the 1999 season as their fifth outfielder. He served in a similar capacity for the Brewers in 2000–01. After spending 2002 in the minor leagues, Mouton played part of the 2003 season in the Mexican League with the Broncos de Reynosa before retiring.

== Career summary ==
In eight seasons, Mouton played 723 games, and hit .246, 18 home runs, and 148 runs batted in.

== Personal life ==
Mouton has three children. He is an area scout for the San Francisco Giants, based in Missouri City, Texas. He used to be an area scout for the Arizona Diamondbacks.
