= Heath Haynes =

American baseball player (born 1968)

- Pitcher
- Born: November 30, 1968 (age 57); Wheeling, West Virginia, U.S.
- Batted: Right Threw: Right

Professional debut
- MLB: June 1, 1994, for the Montreal Expos
- CPBL: May 1, 1998, for the Wei Chuan Dragons

Last appearance
- MLB: June 8, 1994, for the Montreal Expos
- CPBL: 1998, for the Wei Chuan Dragons

MLB statistics
- Win–loss record: 0–0
- Earned run average: 0.00
- Strikeouts: 1

CPBL statistics
- Win–loss record: 0–0
- Earned run average: 1.18
- Strikeouts: 24
- Stats at Baseball Reference

Teams
- Montreal Expos (1994); Wei Chuan Dragons (1998)

Career highlights and awards
- Taiwan Series champions (1998)

Heath Burnett Haynes (born November 30, 1968) is an American former Major League Baseball pitcher. Haynes played for the Montreal Expos in 1994. He batted and threw right-handed.

== Career ==
He was signed by the Expos as an amateur free agent in 1991. Haynes briefly appeared in the majors in 1994 for the Expos, and also played in the minor leagues for the Oakland Athletics, California Angels, Boston Red Sox, Colorado Rockies, Florida Marlins, and Houston Astros. He also played for the Valley Vipers of the Western Baseball League and the Wei Chuan Dragons of the Chinese Professional Baseball League.
