= Rod Henderson =

American baseball player (born 1971)

- Pitcher
- Born: March 11, 1971 (age 54); Greensburg, Kentucky, U.S.
- Batted: Right Threw: Right

MLB debut
- April 19, 1994, for the Montreal Expos

Last MLB appearance
- September 23, 1998, for the Milwaukee Brewers

MLB statistics
- Win–loss record: 0-1
- Earned run average: 9.58
- Strikeouts: 4
- Stats at Baseball Reference

Teams
- Montreal Expos (1994); Milwaukee Brewers (1998)

Rodney Wood Henderson (born March 11, 1971) is an American former professional baseball pitcher. He played in Major League Baseball (MLB) for the Montreal Expos in 1994 and the Milwaukee Brewers in 1998. He is currently a scout for the Pittsburgh Pirates.

== Playing career ==
Henderson attended Glasgow High School in Glasgow, Kentucky, and the University of Kentucky, where he pitched for the Kentucky Wildcats baseball team. In 1991, he played collegiate summer baseball with the Chatham A's of the Cape Cod Baseball League.

Henderson was drafted by the Montreal Expos in the second round of the 1992 Major League Baseball draft. He pitched for the Montreal Expos in 1994, and the Milwaukee Brewers in 1998. Henderson finished his playing career with the Sacramento River Cats, the AAA affiliate of the Oakland Athletics, in 2001.

== Scouting career ==
Henderson joined the New York Mets scouting department in October 2001, and currently holds the title of Professional Evaluation Team Leader with the Pittsburgh Pirates.
