= Andy Carter (baseball) =

American baseball player (born 1968)

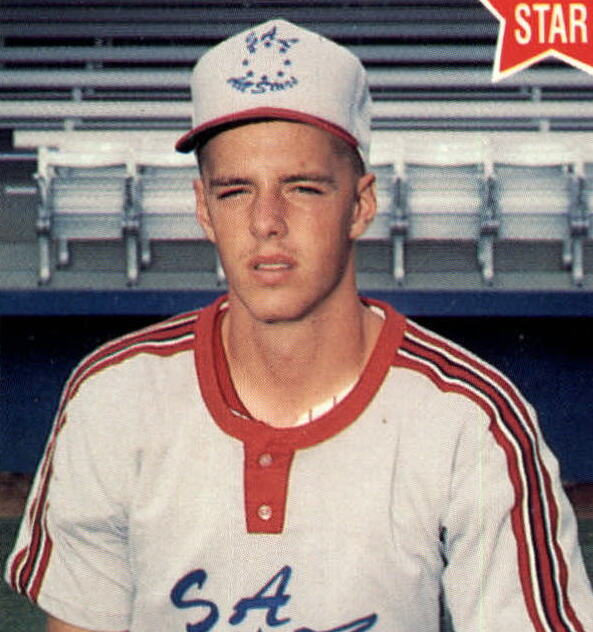
- Carter c. 1988
- Pitcher
- Born: November 9, 1968 (age 57); Philadelphia, Pennsylvania
- Batted: Left Threw: Left

MLB debut
- May 3, 1994, for the Philadelphia Phillies

Last MLB appearance
- May 15, 1995, for the Philadelphia Phillies

MLB statistics
- Win–loss record: 0–2
- Earned run average: 4.75
- Strikeouts: 24

CPBL statistics
- Win–loss record: 2–5
- Earned run average: 5.26
- Strikeouts: 48
- Stats at Baseball Reference

Teams
- Philadelphia Phillies (1994–1995); Uni-President Lions (1998)

Andrew Godfrey Carter (born November 9, 1968) is an American former professional baseball pitcher, who played in Major League Baseball (MLB) for the Philadelphia Phillies in 1994 and 1995.

In 24 career games, Carter had a 0–2 record with a 4.75 earned run average (ERA). He threw and batted left-handed.

Carter was drafted by the Phillies in the 37th round (952nd overall) of the 1987 amateur draft.
