= William Van Landingham =

American baseball player

- Pitcher
- Born: July 16, 1970 (age 54); Columbia, Tennessee, U.S.
- Batted: Right Threw: Right

MLB debut
- May 21, 1994, for the San Francisco Giants

Last MLB appearance
- July 27, 1997, for the San Francisco Giants

MLB statistics
- Win–loss record: 27–26
- Earned run average: 4.54
- Strikeouts: 300

Teams
- San Francisco Giants (1994–1997)

William Joseph Van Landingham (born July 16, 1970) is an American former pitcher in Major League Baseball who played his entire Major League career with the San Francisco Giants.

== Career ==
Van Landingham's rookie season of 1994 was his best, when he posted an 8–2 record with a 3.54 ERA and finished seventh in the balloting for the Rookie of the Year Award. His 1995 season was similar, but as a full-time starting pitcher in 1996, he posted a 9–14 record with a 5.40 ERA.

Van Landingham played his final Major League Baseball game on July 27, 1997. After being affiliated with the Angels, Expos, and Brewers in the minor leagues, he moved to Athens, Georgia, to live with his family.

== Name length ==
Van Landingham was widely considered to have set the record for longest surname in the history of Major League Baseball, at 13 or 14 characters (depending on whether one counts the space), though his record has since been tied or broken (again, depending on the reckoning of the space) by Jarrod Saltalamacchia. When Van Landingham pitched to Todd Hollandsworth in 1995, the two set a record for longest combined pitcher-batter name length (since at least 1957) at 26 letters. On May 29, 1996, Van Landingham started against Jason Isringhausen, then a starter for the New York Mets, tying a record for the longest combined names of two starting pitchers.

Van Landingham also set the record for the longest complete name in Major League Baseball at 20 letters. The record has since been tied by Jarrod Saltalamacchia.
