= Bobby Muñoz =

Puerto Rican baseball and basketball player (born 1968)

- Pitcher
- Born: March 3, 1968 (age 58); Río Piedras, Puerto Rico
- Batted: Right Threw: Right

MLB debut
- May 29, 1993, for the New York Yankees

Last MLB appearance
- October 4, 2001, for the Montreal Expos

MLB statistics
- Win–loss record: 11–22
- Earned run average: 5.17
- Strikeouts: 153

CPBL statistics
- Win–loss record: 0–1
- Earned run average: 2.65
- Strikeouts: 14
- Stats at Baseball Reference

Teams
- New York Yankees (1993); Philadelphia Phillies (1994–1997); Baltimore Orioles (1998); Montreal Expos (2001); Macoto Gida (2003)

Roberto "Bobby" Munoz Cancel (born March 3, 1968) is a Puerto Rican former professional baseball pitcher and professional basketball player. He played in Major League Baseball from 1993 to 2001 for the New York Yankees, Philadelphia Phillies, Montreal Expos, and Baltimore Orioles. Munoz had 11 career wins and one career save, which came on April 7, 1994. Munoz pitched the final 3 innings of a 13-8 Phillies victory over the Rockies to earn the save.

In basketball, he played for the Leones de Ponce of the Puerto Rican BSN professional basketball league from 1987 to 1989.

== See also ==
- List of Major League Baseball players from Puerto Rico
- List of Puerto Ricans
