= Butch Henry =

American baseball player (born 1968)

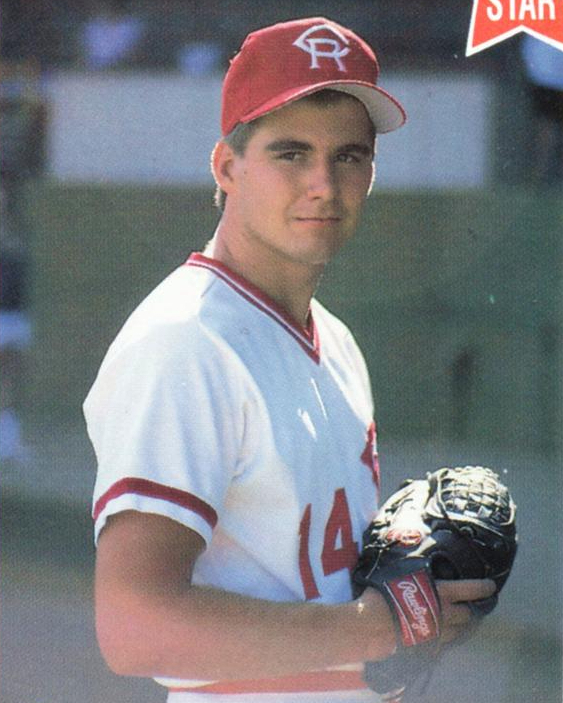
- Henry with the Cedar Rapids Reds c. 1988
- Pitcher
- Born: October 7, 1968 (age 57); El Paso, Texas, U.S.
- Batted: Left Threw: Left

MLB debut
- April 9, 1992, for the Houston Astros

Last MLB appearance
- September 10, 1999, for the Seattle Mariners

MLB statistics
- Win–loss record: 33–33
- Earned run average: 3.83
- Strikeouts: 345
- Stats at Baseball Reference

Teams
- Houston Astros (1992); Colorado Rockies (1993); Montreal Expos (1993–1995); Boston Red Sox (1997–1998); Seattle Mariners (1999)

Floyd Bluford "Butch" Henry III (born October 7, 1968) is an American former Major League Baseball (MLB) pitcher who played for five MLB teams from 1992 to 1999. Listed at 6 feet 1 inch (1.85 m) and 195 pounds (88 kg), he pitched and batted left-handed. Henry has also been a coach in Minor League Baseball and a manager in independent baseball.

== Playing career ==
Henry was selected by the Cincinnati Reds in the 15th round of the 1987 MLB draft. He was 23 years old when he made his major league debut on April 9, 1992, with the Houston Astros.

During his career, Henry had a record of 33–33, with a 3.83 ERA and 345 strikeouts in 621 innings pitched. He also played for the Montreal Expos, Boston Red Sox, and the Seattle Mariners. He had the best year of his career with the 1994 Expos, when he posted an 8–3 record with a 2.43 ERA.

After spending the entire 2000 season on the disabled list, and a short-lived comeback attempt in the minors in 2001, Henry announced his retirement in 2003 due to arm troubles.

== Post-playing career ==
Henry served as a coach in 2004 for the Sarasota Reds, the Cincinnati Reds' affiliate in the Gulf Coast League. The following year, he was the pitching coach for the Billings Mustangs of the Pioneer League, the Rookie Advanced affiliate of the Reds.

Henry became manager for the El Paso Diablos of the American Association of Professional Baseball in 2006. In 2007, he led the Diablos to a South Division-best record of 56–40 and a playoff berth, the team's first since 2000, when they played in the Texas League. The 2007 team's batting and pitching both improved under Henry. The team's batting average for the Diablos was 15 points higher (.279 to .294), while the pitching ERA was almost a full two runs lower (6.18 to 4.37) as compared to 2006. The Diablos also led the league in runs scored and hits and were second in team batting average. As a result, Henry won the league's Manager of the Year award. Henry's final season with the Diablos was 2010. The team had a record of 205–268 during the five seasons that Henry managed the club.

Henry was the pitching coach for the Class A Short Season Staten Island Yankees in 2015 and rookie-league Pulaski Yankees in 2016.

== Personal life ==
Henry is a 2010 inductee of the El Paso Athletic Hall of Fame.
