= Brian Williams (baseball) =

American baseball player (born 1969)

- Pitcher
- Born: February 15, 1969 (age 57); Lancaster, South Carolina, U.S.
- Batted: Right Threw: Right

MLB debut
- September 17, 1991, for the Houston Astros

Last MLB appearance
- July 5, 2000, for the Cleveland Indians

MLB statistics
- Win–loss record: 26–38
- Earned run average: 5.37
- Strikeouts: 397
- Stats at Baseball Reference

Teams
- Houston Astros (1991–1994); San Diego Padres (1995); Detroit Tigers (1996); Baltimore Orioles (1997); Fukuoka Daiei Hawks (1998); Houston Astros (1999); Chicago Cubs (2000); Cleveland Indians (2000)

Brian O'Neal Williams (born February 15, 1969) is an American former Major League Baseball player. A pitcher, Williams played for the Houston Astros (1992–1995, and 1999), San Diego Padres (1995), Detroit Tigers (1996), Baltimore Orioles (1997), Fukuoka Daiei Hawks (1998), and Chicago Cubs and Cleveland Indians (2000).
