= 1994 Major League Baseball All-Star Game =

1994 American baseball competition

	1	2	3	4	5	6	7	8	9	10	R	H	E
American League	1	0	0	0	0	3	3	0	0	0	7	15	0
National League	1	0	3	0	0	1	0	0	2	1	8	12	1
- Date: July 12, 1994
- Venue: Three Rivers Stadium
- City: Pittsburgh, Pennsylvania
- Managers: Cito Gaston (TOR); Jim Fregosi (PHI)
- MVP: Fred McGriff (ATL)
- Attendance: 59,568
- Ceremonial first pitch: Willie Stargell
- Television: NBC
- TV announcers: Bob Costas, Joe Morgan and Bob Uecker
- Radio: CBS
- Radio announcers: John Rooney, Jerry Coleman and Jeff Torborg

The 1994 Major League Baseball All-Star Game was the 65th playing of the midsummer classic between the all-stars of the American League (AL) and National League (NL), the two leagues comprising Major League Baseball. The game was held on July 12, 1994, at Three Rivers Stadium in Pittsburgh, Pennsylvania, the home of the Pittsburgh Pirates of the National League, and tied the Pirates with the Cleveland Guardians and Cincinnati Reds for the all-time record of most All-Star Games hosted by one franchise, with four. It was the second and final Midsummer Classic to be held at Three Rivers Stadium, as the Pirates would move to PNC Park ahead of hosting the 2006 MLB All-Star Game.

The game resulted in the National League defeating the American League 8–7 in 10 innings. It was the National League's first win since 1987. This All-Star Game also marked the inaugural telecast for The Baseball Network, a joint-venture between Major League Baseball, ABC and NBC. This was NBC's first television broadcast of a Major League Baseball game since Game 5 of the 1989 National League Championship Series on October 9 of that year.

== Rosters ==
Players in italics have since been inducted into the National Baseball Hall of Fame.

=== American League ===
Elected starters
Position	Player	Team	All-Star Games
C	Iván Rodríguez	Rangers	3
1B	Frank Thomas	White Sox	2
2B	Roberto Alomar	Blue Jays	5
3B	Wade Boggs	Yankees	10
SS	Cal Ripken Jr.	Orioles	12
OF	Joe Carter	Blue Jays	4
OF	Ken Griffey Jr.	Mariners	5
OF	Kirby Puckett	Twins	9

Pitchers
Position	Player	Team	All-Star Games
P	Wilson Álvarez	White Sox	1
P	Jason Bere	White Sox	1
P	Ricky Bones	Brewers	1
P	David Cone	Royals	3
P	Pat Hentgen	Blue Jays	2
P	Randy Johnson	Mariners	3
P	Jimmy Key	Yankees	4
P	Mike Mussina	Orioles	3
P	Lee Smith	Orioles	6

Reserves
Position	Player	Team	All-Star Games
C	Mickey Tettleton	Tigers	2
1B	Will Clark	Rangers	6
2B	Chuck Knoblauch	Twins	2
3B	Scott Cooper	Red Sox	2
3B	Travis Fryman	Tigers	3
OF	Albert Belle	Indians	2
OF	Kenny Lofton	Indians	1
OF	Paul O'Neill	Yankees	2
OF	Rubén Sierra	Athletics	4
DH	Chili Davis	Angels	3
DH	Paul Molitor	Blue Jays	7

=== National League ===
Elected starters
Position	Player	Team	All-Star Games
C	Mike Piazza	Dodgers	2
1B	Gregg Jefferies	Cardinals	2
2B	Mariano Duncan	Phillies	1
3B	Matt Williams	Giants	2
SS	Ozzie Smith	Cardinals	13
OF	Barry Bonds	Giants	4
OF	Lenny Dykstra	Phillies	2
OF	David Justice	Braves	2

Pitchers
Position	Player	Team	All-Star Games
P	Rod Beck	Giants	2
P	Doug Drabek	Astros	1
P	Ken Hill	Expos	1
P	John Hudek	Astros	1
P	Danny Jackson	Phillies	2
P	Doug Jones	Phillies	5
P	Greg Maddux	Braves	3
P	Randy Myers	Cubs	2
P	José Rijo	Reds	1
P	Bret Saberhagen	Mets	3

Reserves
Position	Player	Team	All-Star Games
C	Darrin Fletcher	Expos	1
1B	Jeff Bagwell	Astros	1
1B	Fred McGriff	Braves	2
2B	Craig Biggio	Astros	3
2B	Carlos García	Pirates	1
3B	Ken Caminiti	Astros	1
SS	Wil Cordero	Expos	1
SS	Barry Larkin	Reds	6
OF	Moisés Alou	Expos	1
OF	Dante Bichette	Rockies	1
OF	Jeff Conine	Marlins	1
OF	Marquis Grissom	Expos	2
OF	Tony Gwynn	Padres	10

== Game ==
=== Umpires ===
Home Plate	Paul Runge
First Base	John Shulock
Second Base	Jerry Layne
Third Base	Rocky Roe
Left Field	Bill Hohn
Right Field	Jim Joyce

=== Starting lineups ===
American League				National League			
Order	Player	Team	Position	Order	Player	Team	Position
1	Roberto Alomar	Blue Jays	2B	1	Gregg Jefferies	Cardinals	1B
2	Wade Boggs	Yankees	3B	2	Tony Gwynn	Padres	CF
3	Ken Griffey Jr.	Mariners	CF	3	Barry Bonds	Giants	LF
4	Frank Thomas	White Sox	1B	4	Mike Piazza	Dodgers	C
5	Joe Carter	Blue Jays	LF	5	Matt Williams	Giants	3B
6	Kirby Puckett	Twins	RF	6	David Justice	Braves	RF
7	Cal Ripken Jr.	Orioles	SS	7	Mariano Duncan	Phillies	2B
8	Iván Rodríguez	Rangers	C	8	Ozzie Smith	Cardinals	SS
9	Jimmy Key	Yankees	P	9	Greg Maddux	Braves	P

=== Game summary ===
Tuesday, July 12, 1994 8:31 pm (ET) at Three Rivers Stadium in Pittsburgh, Pennsylvania
Team	1	2	3	4	5	6	7	8	9	10	R	H	E
American League	1	0	0	0	0	3	3	0	0	0	7	15	0
National League	1	0	3	0	0	1	0	0	2	1	8	12	1
WP: Doug Jones (1–0) LP: Jason Bere (0–1); Home runs: AL: None; NL: Marquis Grissom (1), Fred McGriff (1)

Cowboy Junkies lead singer Margo Timmins sang the Canadian National Anthem and rock singer Meat Loaf sang the U.S. National Anthem. Both were accompanied by the 1994–95 Penn State ROTC Color Guard. Then, Willie Stargell threw out the ceremonial first pitch. It was once said that "having Willie Stargell on your team is like having a diamond ring on your finger."

The AL got on the board quickly against starting pitcher Greg Maddux. Boggs singled with one out and went to third on Griffey's double in the left center field gap. Frank Thomas the hit a sinking line shot off the glove of Tony Gwynn in center which scored Boggs and moved Griffey to third. But Maddux escaped the jam by stabbing Joe Carter's line drive up the middle and then throwing to first to double off Thomas who had taken off for second. In the bottom of the first the NL got to starter Jimmy Key with a double into the left field corner by the Cardinals' Gregg Jeffries and a sac fly by Barry Bonds who was booed lustily by his former fans in Pittsburgh.

The NL, who had been dominated in the All Star Games the last 2 years, appeared to be pulling away in the third inning against that season's AL Cy Young Award winner David Cone (of the Royals). Pinch hitter Jeff Bagwell hit a one-out single, Jeffries was hit by a pitch, and Tony Gwynn ripped a double into the right field corner scoring both runners (Jeffries just barely getting around the tag of catcher Pudge Rodriguez). After Bonds struck out, the Dodgers' Mike Piazza hit a two-out single scoring Gwynn to increase the margin to 4–1.

The first-place Expos' Ken Hill kept the AL off the scoreboard for two innings. However, in the 6th, the vaunted AL lineup broke through against Doug Drabek. Roberto Alomar singled to center, stole second, and scored on a Griffey hit (his second RBI of the night). Even though Griffey was tagged out in a rundown after his hit, the inning continued with a two-out rally. Frank Thomas singled, then came around to score thanks to an errant throw from Matt Williams on a ground out by Joe Carter. Carter then came home on a hit by the prior year's All-Star game MVP Kirby Puckett.

With the scored tied 4–4, the NL retaliated immediately the next half-inning when the Expos' Marquis Grissom sliced a home run down the right field line off Randy Johnson. Later in the inning, with a runner on and one out, the Pittsburgh crowd roared but then exhaled when the slap-hitting veteran Ozzie Smith nearly hit another home run off the Big Unit – missing the left field foul pole by a few feet.

It all appeared to unravel for the NL in the 7th, clinging to their now slim one-run lead. Astros closer John Hudek quickly gave up a single to Pudge and a walk to Mickey Tettleton. Then the Twins' Chuck Knoblauch looked to have a sure single on the AstroTurf through the left side, but Ozzie Smith made a spectacular diving stop and fired to second for the force play. The play, though, only temporarily halted the AL uprising as veteran Danny Jackson came in to relieve and got knocked around. He allowed a run-scoring double by the Red Sox third baseman Scott Cooper and a 2-run single by the Indians' Kenny Lofton.

The NL looked to be running out of time thanks to scoreless innings by AL pitchers Pat Hentgen of the Blue Jays and Wilson Álvarez of the White Sox. In the 9th the AL brought in veteran closer Lee Smith who had resurrected his dominant stuff one last time with the Orioles that season. He quickly walked Marquis Grissom to lead off. Then got Craig Biggio to hit a sharp grounder to third baseman Scott Cooper at third. However, Cooper double clutched ever so slightly and the AL just missed turning the double play on Biggio. This allowed Fregosi to pinch-hit slugger Fred McGriff, who he had saved up, to come to the plate as the tying run. The Crimedog promptly drove a Smith's splitter into the centerfield stands to tie up the game in dramatic fashion.

In the 10th the NL quickly went to work on AL reliever Jason Bere of the White Sox. Gwynn chopped a single through the box with no one out. The Expos' Moisés Alou then slammed a double that short-hopped the left center field wall. Gwynn was waved all the way home from first base and slid just under Pudge Rodriguez's tag to end the game.

After the game, National League President Leonard S. Coleman Jr. made All-Star history by becoming the first African-American chief of any major league to preside over an MVP award presentation. He presented the award to Fred McGriff in lieu of the Commissioner of Baseball. This position was vacant and would not be filled until 1998 when Bud Selig, who had served as Chairman of the Executive Council since Fay Vincent's resignation in 1992, officially took the post.

=== WEEK-TV transmitter difficulties ===
Peoria's NBC station WEEK-TV suffered misfortunes of significant transmitter difficulties throughout most of the game, forcing WEEK's signal to be knocked off the air until one hour after the conclusion.

The station would later air an abbreviated version of the game the following weekend due to its transmitter problems on NBC's live broadcast.
