= 1994 San Diego Padres season =

1994 San Diego Padres
- League: National League
- Division: West
- Ballpark: Jack Murphy Stadium
- City: San Diego, California
- Record: 47–70 (.402)
- Divisional place: 4th
- Owners: Tom Werner
- General managers: Randy Smith
- Managers: Jim Riggleman
- Television: KUSI-TV; Prime Ticket (Jerry Coleman, Ted Leitner, Bob Chandler)
- Radio: KFMB (AM) (Bob Chandler, Jerry Coleman, Ted Leitner); XEXX (Mario Thomas Zapiain, Matias Santos, Eduardo Ortega)

The 1994 San Diego Padres season was the 26th season in franchise history.

== Offseason ==
- November 18, 1993: Jarvis Brown was selected off waivers from the Padres by the Atlanta Braves.
- November 18, 1993: Darrell Sherman was selected off waivers from the Padres by the Colorado Rockies.
- December 10, 1993: Frank Seminara was traded by the San Diego Padres with a player to be named later and Tracy Sanders (minors) to the New York Mets for a player to be named later and Randy Curtis (minors). The New York Mets sent Marc Kroon (December 13, 1993) to the San Diego Padres to complete the trade. The San Diego Padres sent Pablo Martinez (December 13, 1993) to the New York Mets to complete the trade.
- December 17, 1993: Kevin Elster was signed as a free agent with the San Diego Padres.
- January 20, 1994: Jeff Gardner was released by the Padres.
- March 21, 1994: Kevin Elster was released by the San Diego Padres.

== Regular season ==
By Friday, August 12, the Padres had compiled a record of 47-70 through 117 games. They had scored 479 runs (4.09 per game) and allowed 531 runs (4.54 per game). They were also leading the majors in at-bats at the time, with 4,068. They also drew the fewest walks in the majors, with 319, and tied the New York Yankees for the most double plays grounded into, with 112.

=== Opening Day starters ===
- Brad Ausmus
- Derek Bell
- Andy Benes
- Archi Cianfrocco
- Ricky Gutiérrez
- Tony Gwynn
- Phil Plantier
- Bip Roberts
- Dave Staton

=== Season standings ===
NL West
Team	W	L	Pct.	GB	Home	Road
Los Angeles Dodgers	58	56	.509	—	33‍–‍22	25‍–‍34
San Francisco Giants	55	60	.478	3½	29‍–‍31	26‍–‍29
Colorado Rockies	53	64	.453	6½	25‍–‍32	28‍–‍32
San Diego Padres	47	70	.402	12½	26‍–‍31	21‍–‍39

Division leaders
Team	W	L	Pct.
Montreal Expos	74	40	.649
Cincinnati Reds	66	48	.579
Los Angeles Dodgers	58	56	.509

Wild Card team	W	L	Pct.	GB
Atlanta Braves	68	46	0.597	—
Houston Astros	66	49	0.574	2 1/2
New York Mets	55	58	0.487	12 1/2
San Francisco Giants	55	60	0.478	13 1/2
Philadelphia Phillies	54	61	0.470	14 1/2
St. Louis Cardinals	53	61	0.465	15
Pittsburgh Pirates	53	61	0.465	15
Colorado Rockies	53	64	0.453	16 1/2
Florida Marlins	51	64	0.444	17 1/2
Chicago Cubs	49	64	0.434	18 1/2
San Diego Padres	47	70	0.402	22 1/2

=== Record vs. opponents ===
1994 National League record Source: MLB Standings Grid – 1994
Team	ATL	CHC	CIN	COL	FLA	HOU	LAD	MON	NYM	PHI	PIT	SD	SF	STL
Atlanta	—	4–2	5–5	8–2	8–4	3–3	6–0	4–5	5–4	6–3	3–9	6–1	5–1	5–7
Chicago	2–4	—	5–7	6–6	4–5	4–8	3–3	2–4	1–4	1–6	5–5	6–3	5–4	5–5
Cincinnati	5–5	7–5	—	4–4	7–5	4–6	3–6	4–2	2–4	4–2	9–3	8–2	7–2	2–2–1
Colorado	2–8	6–6	4–4	—	3–9	5–5	4–6	4–2	5–1	2–4	2–3	5–5	3–7	8–4
Florida	4–8	5–4	5–7	9–3	—	2–4	3–3	2–7	6–4	4–6	1–6	5–1	2–4	3–7
Houston	3–3	8–4	6–4	5–5	4–2	—	1–8	2–4	3–3	5–1	8–4	5–5	8–2	8–4
Los Angeles	0–6	3–3	6–3	6–4	3–3	8–1	—	3–9	6–6	7–5	3–3	6–4	5–5	2–4
Montreal	5–4	4–2	2–4	2–4	7–2	4–2	9–3	—	4–3	5–4	8–2	12–0	5–7	7–3
New York	4–5	4–1	4–2	1–5	4–6	3–3	6–6	3–4	—	4–6	4–5	6–6	6–6	6–3
Philadelphia	3-6	6–1	2–4	4–2	6–4	1–5	5–7	4–5	6–4	—	5–4	4–8	4–8	4–3
Pittsburgh	9–3	5–5	3–9	3–2	6–1	4–8	3–3	2–8	5–4	4–5	—	3–3	1–5	5–5
San Diego	1–6	3–6	2–8	5–5	1–5	5–5	4–6	0–12	6–6	8–4	3–3	—	5–2	4–2
San Francisco	1–5	4–5	2–7	7–3	4–2	2–8	5–5	7–5	6–6	8–4	5–1	2–5	—	2–4
St. Louis	7–5	5–5	2–2–1	4–8	7–3	4–8	4–2	3–7	3–6	3–4	5–5	2–4	4–2	—

=== Notable transactions ===
- April 13, 1994: Kevin Maas was signed as a free agent by the Padres.
- May 11, 1994: Gene Harris was traded by the Padres to the Detroit Tigers for Jorge Velandia and Scott Livingstone.
- May 20, 1994: Mackey Sasser was signed as a free agent by the Padres.
- May 23, 1994: Kevin Maas was released by the Padres.
- May 24, 1994: Mark Davis was released by the Padres.
- June 26, 1994: Mackey Sasser was released by the Padres.

=== Roster ===
1994 San Diego Padres
Roster
Pitchers: 43 Andy Ashby; 40 Andy Benes; 49 Doug Brocail; 48 Mike Campbell; 48 Mark Davis; 38 Donnie Elliott; 39 Bryce Florie; 50 Joey Hamilton; 33 Gene Harris; 51 Trevor Hoffman; 33 Bill Krueger; 47 José Martínez; 42 Pedro Martínez; 52 Tim Mauser; 44 A. J. Sager; 27 Scott Sanders; 46 Jeff Tabaka; 37 Kerry Taylor; 41 Wally Whitehurst; 36 Tim Worrell	Catchers: 11 Brad Ausmus; 28 Brian Johnson; Infielders: 26 Archi Cianfrocco; 30 Phil Clark; 7 Ricky Gutiérrez; 12 Ray Holbert; 17 Tim Hyers; 9 Scott Livingstone; 2 Keith Lockhart; 1 Luis López; 10 Bip Roberts; 18 Craig Shipley; 31 Dave Staton; 23 Eddie Williams	Outfielders: 21 Billy Bean; 4 Derek Bell; 19 Tony Gwynn; 20 Ray McDavid; 3 Melvin Nieves; 24 Phil Plantier	Manager: 8 Jim Riggleman; Coaches: 32 Dave Bialas (bullpen); 15 Bruce Bochy (third base); 5 Rob Picciolo (bench); 22 Dan Radison (first base); 16 Merv Rettenmund (hitting); 34 Sonny Siebert (pitching)

== Player stats ==
=== Batting ===
==== Starters by position ====
Note: Pos = Position; G = Games played; AB = At bats; H = Hits; Avg. = Batting average; HR = Home runs; RBI = Runs batted in

Pos	Player	G	AB	H	Avg.	HR	RBI
C	Brad Ausmus	101	327	82	.251	7	24
1B	Eddie Williams	58	175	58	.331	11	42
2B	Bip Roberts	105	403	129	.320	2	31
3B	Scott Livingstone	57	180	49	.272	2	10
SS	Ricky Gutiérrez	90	275	66	.240	1	28
LF	Phil Plantier	96	341	75	.220	18	41
CF	Derek Bell	108	434	135	.311	14	54
RF	Tony Gwynn	110	419	165	.394	12	64

==== Other batters ====
Note: G = Games played; AB = At bats; H = Hits; Avg. = Batting average; HR = Home runs; RBI = Runs batted in

Player	G	AB	H	Avg.	HR	RBI
Craig Shipley	81	240	80	.333	4	30
Luis López	77	235	65	.277	2	20
Phil Clark	61	149	32	.215	5	20
Archi Cianfrocco	59	146	32	.219	4	13
Billy Bean	84	135	29	.215	0	14
Tim Hyers	52	118	30	.254	0	7
Brian Johnson	36	93	23	.247	3	16
Dave Staton	29	66	12	.182	4	6
Keith Lockhart	27	43	9	.209	2	6
Ray McDavid	9	28	7	.250	0	2
Melvin Nieves	10	19	5	.263	1	4
Ray Holbert	5	5	1	.200	0	0

=== Pitching ===
==== Starting pitchers ====
Note: G = Games pitched; IP = Innings pitched; W = Wins; L = Losses; ERA = Earned run average; SO = Strikeouts

Player	G	IP	W	L	ERA	SO
Andy Benes	25	172.1	6	14	3.86	189
Andy Ashby	24	164.1	6	11	3.40	121
Scott Sanders	23	111.0	4	8	4.78	109
Joey Hamilton	16	108.2	9	6	2.98	61
Wally Whitehurst	13	64.0	4	7	4.92	43
Bill Krueger	8	41.0	3	2	4.83	30
Tim Worrell	3	14.2	0	1	3.68	14
Kerry Taylor	1	4.1	0	0	8.31	3

==== Other pitchers ====
Note: G = Games pitched; IP = Innings pitched; W = Wins; L = Losses; ERA = Earned run average; SO = Strikeouts

Player	G	IP	W	L	ERA	SO
A.J. Sager	22	46.2	1	4	5.98	26
José Martínez	4	12.0	0	2	6.75	7
Mike Campbell	3	8.1	1	1	12.96	10

==== Relief pitchers ====
Note: G = Games pitched; W = Wins; L = Losses; SV = Saves; ERA = Earned run average; SO = Strikeouts

Player	G	W	L	SV	ERA	SO
Trevor Hoffman	47	4	4	20	2.57	68
Pedro Martínez	48	3	2	3	2.90	52
Tim Mauser	35	2	4	2	3.49	42
Jeff Tabaka	34	3	1	1	3.89	30
Donnie Elliott	30	0	1	0	3.27	24
Mark Davis	20	0	1	0	8.82	15
Gene Harris	13	1	1	0	8.03	9
Doug Brocail	12	0	0	0	5.82	11
Bryce Florie	9	0	0	0	0.96	8

== Awards and honors ==
- Andy Benes, National League strikeout champion (189)
- Tony Gwynn, National League batting champion, (.394)

1994 Major League Baseball All-Star Game

== Farm system ==
Level	Team	League	Manager
AAA	Las Vegas Stars	Pacific Coast League	Russ Nixon
AA	Wichita Pilots	Texas League	Keith Champion
A	Rancho Cucamonga Quakes	California League	Tim Flannery
A	Springfield Sultans	Midwest League	Ed Romero
A-Short Season	Spokane Indians	Northwest League	Tye Waller
Rookie	AZL Padres	Arizona League	Barry Moss

LEAGUE CHAMPIONS: Rancho Cucamonga
