= 1994 Atlanta Braves season =

1994 Atlanta Braves
- League: National League
- Division: East
- Ballpark: Atlanta–Fulton County Stadium
- City: Atlanta
- Record: 68–46 (.596)
- Divisional place: 2nd
- Owners: Ted Turner
- General managers: John Schuerholz
- Managers: Bobby Cox
- Television: WTBS; TBS Superstation (Pete Van Wieren, Skip Caray, Don Sutton, Joe Simpson); SportSouth (Ernie Johnson, Ernie Johnson, Jr.)
- Radio: WGST (Pete Van Wieren, Skip Caray, Don Sutton, Joe Simpson)

The 1994 Atlanta Braves season was the Braves' 124th in existence and their 29th in Atlanta. After trading the two-sport athlete Deion Sanders, experts predicted that the Atlanta Braves were going to have their worst season since 1935. The Braves' records reflect just how successful that year was, although it was curtailed due to the 1994–95 Major League Baseball strike. The Braves played a total of 114 games; they won 68 and lost 46. The Braves finished their 1994 season with a winning percentage of .596, ranking the Braves third overall in MLB, although they were six games behind the Montreal Expos in the NL East.

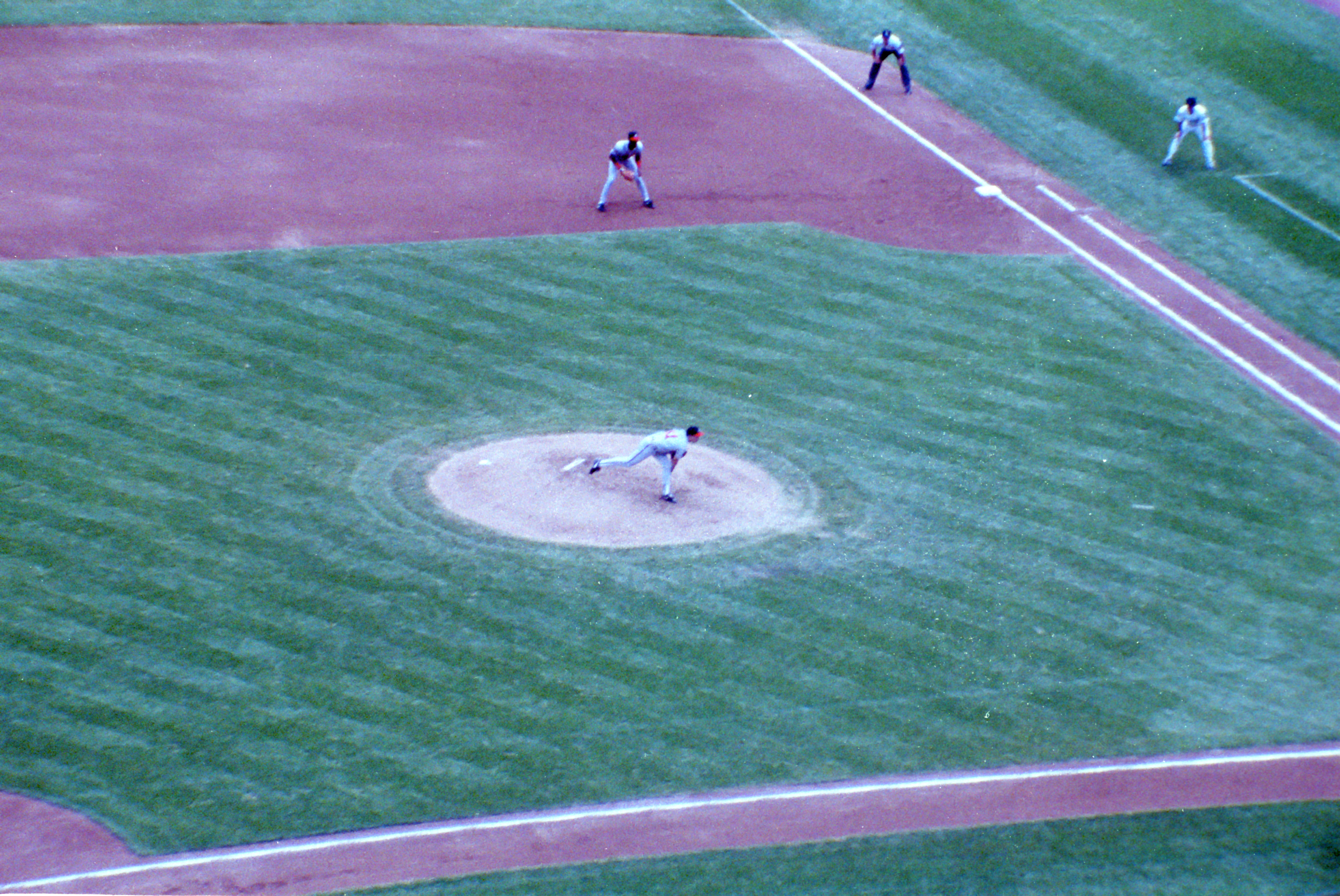
Maddux pitching for the Braves in 1994

== Offseason ==
- October 15, 1993: Jerry Willard was released by the Atlanta Braves.
- October 25, 1993: Marvin Freeman was released by the Atlanta Braves.
- November 18, 1993: Jarvis Brown was selected off waivers by the Atlanta Braves from the San Diego Padres.
- November 24, 1993: Francisco Cabrera was released by the Atlanta Braves.
- November 26, 1993: Charlie O'Brien was signed as a free agent with the Atlanta Braves.
- February 10, 1994: Mike Bielecki was signed as a free agent with the Atlanta Braves.

== Regular season ==
By Friday, August 12, the Braves had compiled a 68–46 record through 114 games. They were leading the 1994 NL Wildcard Race over the Houston Astros by 2.5 games. The Braves had scored 542 runs (4.75 per game) and allowed 448 runs (3.93 per game).

Braves' pitching was perhaps the best in the Majors in 1994: they gave up only 76 home runs in 114 games, the fewest home runs allowed among all 28 teams and they allowed only 929 hits, also the fewest among all 28 teams. Furthermore, they led the MLB in most strikeouts (865) and allowed the fewest runs (448) and earned runs (407).

=== Opening Day starters ===
- Jeff Blauser
- Ryan Klesko
- Mark Lemke
- Fred McGriff
- Charlie O'Brien
- Terry Pendleton
- Deion Sanders
- John Smoltz
- Tony Tarasco

=== Notable transactions ===
May 29, 1994: Deion Sanders was traded by the Atlanta Braves to the Cincinnati Reds for Roberto Kelly and Roger Etheridge (minors).

=== Roster ===
1994 Atlanta Braves
Roster
Pitchers: 33 Steve Avery; 36 Steve Bedrosian; 34 Mike Bielecki; 47 Tom Glavine; 49 Milt Hill; 31 Greg Maddux; 38 Greg McMichael; 50 Kent Mercker; 29 John Smoltz; 30 Mike Stanton; 43 Mark Wohlers; 49 Brad Woodall	Catchers: 8 Javy López; 11 Charlie O'Brien; Infielders: 2 Rafael Belliard; 4 Jeff Blauser; 20 Mark Lemke; 27 Fred McGriff; 19 Mike Mordecai; 45 José Oliva; 32 Bill Pecota; 9 Terry Pendleton	Outfielders: 17 Jarvis Brown; 12 Dave Gallagher; 23 David Justice; 25 Mike Kelly; 14,25 Roberto Kelly; 18 Ryan Klesko; 24 Deion Sanders; 26 Tony Tarasco	Manager: 6 Bobby Cox; Coaches: 37 Jim Beauchamp (bench); 39 Pat Corrales (first base); 28 Clarence Jones (hitting); 54 Leo Mazzone (pitching); 22 Jimy Williams (third base); 52 Ned Yost (bullpen)

== Player stats ==
=== Season standings ===
NL East
Team	W	L	Pct.	GB	Home	Road
Montreal Expos	74	40	.649	—	32‍–‍20	42‍–‍20
Atlanta Braves	68	46	.596	6	31‍–‍24	37‍–‍22
New York Mets	55	58	.487	18½	23‍–‍30	32‍–‍28
Philadelphia Phillies	54	61	.470	20½	34‍–‍26	20‍–‍35
Florida Marlins	51	64	.443	23½	25‍–‍34	26‍–‍30

Division leaders
Team	W	L	Pct.
Montreal Expos	74	40	.649
Cincinnati Reds	66	48	.579
Los Angeles Dodgers	58	56	.509

Wild Card team	W	L	Pct.	GB
Atlanta Braves	68	46	0.597	—
Houston Astros	66	49	0.574	2 1/2
New York Mets	55	58	0.487	12 1/2
San Francisco Giants	55	60	0.478	13 1/2
Philadelphia Phillies	54	61	0.470	14 1/2
St. Louis Cardinals	53	61	0.465	15
Pittsburgh Pirates	53	61	0.465	15
Colorado Rockies	53	64	0.453	16 1/2
Florida Marlins	51	64	0.444	17 1/2
Chicago Cubs	49	64	0.434	18 1/2
San Diego Padres	47	70	0.402	22 1/2

=== Record vs. opponents ===
1994 National League record Source: MLB Standings Grid – 1994
Team	ATL	CHC	CIN	COL	FLA	HOU	LAD	MON	NYM	PHI	PIT	SD	SF	STL
Atlanta	—	4–2	5–5	8–2	8–4	3–3	6–0	4–5	5–4	6–3	3–9	6–1	5–1	5–7
Chicago	2–4	—	5–7	6–6	4–5	4–8	3–3	2–4	1–4	1–6	5–5	6–3	5–4	5–5
Cincinnati	5–5	7–5	—	4–4	7–5	4–6	3–6	4–2	2–4	4–2	9–3	8–2	7–2	2–2–1
Colorado	2–8	6–6	4–4	—	3–9	5–5	4–6	4–2	5–1	2–4	2–3	5–5	3–7	8–4
Florida	4–8	5–4	5–7	9–3	—	2–4	3–3	2–7	6–4	4–6	1–6	5–1	2–4	3–7
Houston	3–3	8–4	6–4	5–5	4–2	—	1–8	2–4	3–3	5–1	8–4	5–5	8–2	8–4
Los Angeles	0–6	3–3	6–3	6–4	3–3	8–1	—	3–9	6–6	7–5	3–3	6–4	5–5	2–4
Montreal	5–4	4–2	2–4	2–4	7–2	4–2	9–3	—	4–3	5–4	8–2	12–0	5–7	7–3
New York	4–5	4–1	4–2	1–5	4–6	3–3	6–6	3–4	—	4–6	4–5	6–6	6–6	6–3
Philadelphia	3-6	6–1	2–4	4–2	6–4	1–5	5–7	4–5	6–4	—	5–4	4–8	4–8	4–3
Pittsburgh	9–3	5–5	3–9	3–2	6–1	4–8	3–3	2–8	5–4	4–5	—	3–3	1–5	5–5
San Diego	1–6	3–6	2–8	5–5	1–5	5–5	4–6	0–12	6–6	8–4	3–3	—	5–2	4–2
San Francisco	1–5	4–5	2–7	7–3	4–2	2–8	5–5	7–5	6–6	8–4	5–1	2–5	—	2–4
St. Louis	7–5	5–5	2–2–1	4–8	7–3	4–8	4–2	3–7	3–6	3–4	5–5	2–4	4–2	—

=== Batting ===
==== Starters by position ====
Note: Pos = Position; G = Games played; AB = At bats; H = Hits; Avg. = Batting average; HR = Home runs; RBI = Runs batted in

Pos	Player	G	AB	H	Avg.	HR	RBI
C	Javy López	80	277	68	.245	13	35
1B	Fred McGriff	113	424	135	.318	34	94
2B	Mark Lemke	104	350	103	.294	3	31
SS	Jeff Blauser	96	380	98	.258	6	45
3B	Terry Pendleton	77	309	78	.252	7	30
LF	Ryan Klesko	92	245	68	.278	17	47
CF	Roberto Kelly	63	255	73	.286	6	24
RF	David Justice	104	352	110	.313	19	59

==== Other batters ====
Note: G = Games played; AB = At bats; H = Hits; Avg. = Batting average; HR = Home runs; RBI = Runs batted in

Player	G	AB	H	Avg.	HR	RBI
Deion Sanders	46	191	55	.288	4	21
Dave Gallagher	89	152	34	.224	2	14
Charlie O'Brien	51	152	37	.243	8	28
Tony Tarasco	87	132	36	.273	5	19
Rafael Belliard	46	120	29	.242	0	9
Bill Pecota	64	112	24	.214	2	16
Mike Kelly	30	77	21	.273	2	9
José Oliva	19	59	17	.288	6	11
Jarvis Brown	17	15	2	.133	1	1
Mike Mordecai	4	4	1	.250	1	3

=== Pitching ===
==== Starting pitchers ====
Note: G = Games pitched; IP = Innings pitched; W = Wins; L = Losses; ERA = Earned run average; SO = Strikeouts

Player	G	IP	W	L	ERA	SO
Greg Maddux	25	202.0	16	6	1.56	156
Tom Glavine	25	165.1	13	9	3.97	140
Steve Avery	24	151.2	8	3	4.04	122
John Smoltz	21	134.2	6	10	4.14	113
Kent Mercker	20	112.1	9	4	3.45	111
Brad Woodall	1	6.0	0	1	4.50	2

===== Relief pitchers =====
Note: G = Games pitched; W = Wins; L = Losses; SV = Saves; ERA = Earned run average; SO = Strikeouts

Player	G	W	L	SV	ERA	SO
Greg McMichael	51	4	6	21	3.84	47
Mark Wohlers	51	7	2	1	4.59	58
Mike Stanton	49	3	1	3	3.55	35
Steve Bedrosian	46	0	2	0	3.33	43
Mike Bielecki	19	2	0	0	4.00	18
Gregg Olson	16	0	2	1	9.20	10
Milt Hill	10	0	0	0	7.94	10

== Award winners ==
- Greg Maddux, P, Gold Glove
- Greg Maddux, P, National League Cy Young Award
- Greg Maddux, The Sporting News Pitcher of the Year Award
- Fred McGriff, 1B, Major League Baseball All-Star Game MVP

1994 Major League Baseball All-Star Game

- David Justice, OF, starter
- Greg Maddux, P, starter
- Fred McGriff, 1B, reserve

== Farm system ==
Level	Team	League	Manager
AAA	Richmond Braves	International League	Grady Little
AA	Greenville Braves	Southern League	Bruce Benedict
A	Durham Bulls	Carolina League	Matt West
A	Macon Braves	South Atlantic League	Leon Roberts
Rookie	Danville Braves	Appalachian League	Paul Runge
Rookie	GCL Braves	Gulf Coast League	Jim Saul
Rookie	Idaho Falls Braves	Pioneer League	Max Venable

LEAGUE CHAMPIONS: Richmond
