= 1994 Cincinnati Reds season =

1994 Cincinnati Reds
- League: National League
- Division: Central
- Ballpark: Riverfront Stadium
- City: Cincinnati
- Record: 66–48 (.579)
- Divisional place: 1st
- Owners: Marge Schott
- General managers: Jim Bowden
- Managers: Davey Johnson
- Television: WLWT; SportsChannel Cincinnati (George Grande, Chris Welsh)
- Radio: WLW (Marty Brennaman, Joe Nuxhall)

The 1994 Cincinnati Reds season was the 125th season for the franchise in Major League Baseball, and their 25th and 24th full season at Riverfront Stadium. The team moved to the new National League Central in the 1994 season. They were leading the division by a half game before a strike ended the 1994 Major League Baseball season in mid-August.

== Offseason ==
- November 2, 1993: Dan Wilson and Bobby Ayala were traded by the Reds to the Seattle Mariners for Bret Boone and Erik Hanson.
- November 4, 1993: Jerome Walton was signed as a free agent by the Reds.
- November 23, 1993: Steve Lake was signed as a free agent by the Reds.
- November 24, 1993: Casey Candaele was signed as a free agent by the Reds.
- March 8, 1994: Tony Fernández was signed as a free agent by the Reds.

== Regular season ==
For the first time, the Opening Day game was moved to Sunday night as part of ESPN's Sunday Night Baseball. Up to that point, traditionally Opening Day was held on a Monday, with the Reds customarily hosting the first game of the afternoon. The move was met with some controversy, as many fans and traditionalists, including Reds owner Marge Schott, were not happy about the Sunday night game, especially since it was also Easter Sunday. Many tickets for the Sunday night game went unsold, and the team elected to wait until Monday afternoon's game for the traditional Opening Day pageantry and festivities. A sparse crowd of only 32,803 braved frigid weather Sunday night April 3 to watch the Reds lose 6–4 to the St. Louis Cardinals.

For Game 2 on Monday April 4, dubbed by most in attendance the "traditional" opening day, a sold out, standing room only crowd of 55,093 arrived at Riverfront Stadium, shrugging off the previous night's game. The pomp and ceremony, including the traditional Findlay Market parade was held under sunny skies. Kevin Mitchell hit a walk-off home run in the bottom of the 10th inning to win the game 5–4.

By Friday, August 12, the Reds had compiled a 66–48 record through 114 games (although they had actually played 115 games, since their April 6 game against the St. Louis Cardinals at Riverfront Stadium ended tied 8–8 after the top of the 6th inning due to poor weather). They were leading the NL Central Division by just half a game over the Houston Astros. Prior to the strike, they had scored 609 runs (5.30 per game) and had allowed 490 runs (4.26 per game).

=== Game log ===
1994 Regular Season Game Log (66-48-1) (Home: 37-22-1; Road: 29-26)
April (15-7-1) (Home: 10-2-1; Road: 5-5)

#	Date	Opponent	Score	Win	Loss	Save	Attendance	Record	Report
1	April 3	Cardinals							
2	April 4	Cardinals							
3	April 6	Cardinals							
4	April 8	Phillies							
5	April 9	Phillies							
6	April 10	Phillies							
7	April 11	@ Expos	9-4 (11 inn.)	Carrasco (3–0)	Heredia (0–1)		12,526	5-1-1	Boxscore
8	April 12	@ Expos	7-1	Pugh (1–0)	Boucher (0–1)		12,466	6-1-1	Boxscore
9	April 13	@ Expos	2-3	Wetteland (1-1)	McElroy (0–1)		14,072	6-2-1	Boxscore
10	April 15	@ Phillies							
11	April 16	@ Phillies							
12	April 17	@ Phillies							
13	April 19	Pirates							
14	April 20	Pirates							
15	April 22	Marlins							
16	April 23	Marlins							
17	April 24	Marlins							
18	April 25	Cubs							
19	April 26	Cubs							
20	April 27	@ Pirates							
21	April 28	@ Pirates							
22	April 29	@ Marlins							
23	April 30	@ Marlins							

May (14-15) (Home: 7-5; Road: 7-10)

#	Date	Opponent	Score	Win	Loss	Save	Attendance	Record	Report
24	May 1	@ Marlins							
25	May 2	@ Cubs							
26	May 3	@ Cubs							
27	May 4	@ Cubs							
28	May 5	Astros							
29	May 6	Astros							
30	May 7	Astros							
31	May 8	Astros							
32	May 9	@ Padres							
33	May 10	@ Padres							
34	May 11	@ Padres							
35	May 13	@ Giants							
36	May 14	@ Giants							
37	May 15	@ Giants							
38	May 17	Braves							
39	May 18	Braves							
40	May 19	Braves							
41	May 20	Dodgers							
42	May 21	Dodgers							
43	May 22	Dodgers							
44	May 23	@ Rockies							
45	May 24	@ Rockies							
46	May 25	@ Rockies							
47	May 26	@ Rockies							
48	May 27	@ Mets							
49	May 28	@ Mets							
50	May 29	@ Mets							
51	May 30	Expos	7-3	Rijo (3-3)	Hill (8–3)		27,875	28-22-1	Boxscore
52	May 31	Expos	5-4 (13 inn.)	Schourek (3–0)	Shaw (2-2)		25,046	29-22-1	Boxscore

June (15-11) (Home: 10-4; Road: 5-7)

#	Date	Opponent	Score	Win	Loss	Save	Attendance	Record	Report
53	June 1	Expos	9-10	Scott (3–2)	Carrasco (3–2)	Martínez (1)	23,653	29-23-1	Boxscore
54	June 3	Mets							
55	June 4	Mets							
56	June 5	Mets							
57	June 7	@ Cardinals							
58	June 8	@ Cardinals							
59	June 9	Rockies							
60	June 10	Rockies							
61	June 11	Rockies							
62	June 12	Rockies							
63	June 13	@ Dodgers							
64	June 14	@ Dodgers							
65	June 15	@ Dodgers							
66	June 17	@ Braves							
67	June 18	@ Braves							
68	June 19	@ Braves							
69	June 21	Giants							
70	June 22	Giants							
71	June 23	Giants							
72	June 24	Padres							
73	June 25	Padres							
74	June 26	Padres							
75	June 27	@ Astros							
76	June 28	@ Astros							
77	June 29	@ Astros							
78	June 30	@ Pirates							

July (17-10) (Home: 8-6; Road: 9-4)

#	Date	Opponent	Score	Win	Loss	Save	Attendance	Record	Report
79	July 1	@ Pirates							
80	July 2	@ Pirates							
81	July 3	@ Pirates							
82	July 4	@ Marlins							
83	July 5	@ Marlins							
84	July 6	@ Marlins							
85	July 7	Pirates							
86	July 8	Pirates							
87	July 9	Pirates							
88	July 10	Pirates							
All-Star Break: NL def. AL at Three Rivers Stadium, 8–7 (10)
89	July 14	Cubs							
90	July 15	Cubs							
91	July 16	Cubs							
92	July 17	Cubs							
93	July 18	Marlins							
94	July 19	Marlins							
95	July 20	Marlins							
96	July 22	@ Cubs							
97	July 23	@ Cubs							
98	July 24	@ Cubs							
99	July 25	Astros							
100	July 26	Astros							
101	July 27	Astros							
102	July 28	@ Padres							
103	July 29	@ Padres							
104	July 30	@ Padres							
105	July 31	@ Padres							

August (5-5) (Home: 2-5; Road: 3-0)

#	Date	Opponent	Score	Win	Loss	Save	Attendance	Record	Report
106	August 1	@ Giants							
107	August 2	@ Giants							
108	August 3	@ Giants							
109	August 5	Braves							
110	August 6	Braves							
111	August 7	Braves							
112	August 8	Braves							
113	August 9	Dodgers							
114	August 10	Dodgers							
115	August 11	Dodgers							

Legend
Reds win	Reds loss	All-Star Game	Game postponed

=== Season standings ===
NL Central
Team	W	L	Pct.	GB	Home	Road
Cincinnati Reds	66	48	.579	—	37‍–‍22	29‍–‍26
Houston Astros	66	49	.574	½	37‍–‍22	29‍–‍27
Pittsburgh Pirates	53	61	.465	13	32‍–‍29	21‍–‍32
St. Louis Cardinals	53	61	.465	13	23‍–‍33	30‍–‍28
Chicago Cubs	49	64	.434	16½	20‍–‍39	29‍–‍25

Division leaders
Team	W	L	Pct.
Montreal Expos	74	40	.649
Cincinnati Reds	66	48	.579
Los Angeles Dodgers	58	56	.509

Wild Card team	W	L	Pct.	GB
Atlanta Braves	68	46	0.597	—
Houston Astros	66	49	0.574	2 1/2
New York Mets	55	58	0.487	12 1/2
San Francisco Giants	55	60	0.478	13 1/2
Philadelphia Phillies	54	61	0.470	14 1/2
St. Louis Cardinals	53	61	0.465	15
Pittsburgh Pirates	53	61	0.465	15
Colorado Rockies	53	64	0.453	16 1/2
Florida Marlins	51	64	0.444	17 1/2
Chicago Cubs	49	64	0.434	18 1/2
San Diego Padres	47	70	0.402	22 1/2

=== Record vs. opponents ===
1994 National League record Source: MLB Standings Grid – 1994
Team	ATL	CHC	CIN	COL	FLA	HOU	LAD	MON	NYM	PHI	PIT	SD	SF	STL
Atlanta	—	4–2	5–5	8–2	8–4	3–3	6–0	4–5	5–4	6–3	3–9	6–1	5–1	5–7
Chicago	2–4	—	5–7	6–6	4–5	4–8	3–3	2–4	1–4	1–6	5–5	6–3	5–4	5–5
Cincinnati	5–5	7–5	—	4–4	7–5	4–6	3–6	4–2	2–4	4–2	9–3	8–2	7–2	2–2–1
Colorado	2–8	6–6	4–4	—	3–9	5–5	4–6	4–2	5–1	2–4	2–3	5–5	3–7	8–4
Florida	4–8	5–4	5–7	9–3	—	2–4	3–3	2–7	6–4	4–6	1–6	5–1	2–4	3–7
Houston	3–3	8–4	6–4	5–5	4–2	—	1–8	2–4	3–3	5–1	8–4	5–5	8–2	8–4
Los Angeles	0–6	3–3	6–3	6–4	3–3	8–1	—	3–9	6–6	7–5	3–3	6–4	5–5	2–4
Montreal	5–4	4–2	2–4	2–4	7–2	4–2	9–3	—	4–3	5–4	8–2	12–0	5–7	7–3
New York	4–5	4–1	4–2	1–5	4–6	3–3	6–6	3–4	—	4–6	4–5	6–6	6–6	6–3
Philadelphia	3-6	6–1	2–4	4–2	6–4	1–5	5–7	4–5	6–4	—	5–4	4–8	4–8	4–3
Pittsburgh	9–3	5–5	3–9	3–2	6–1	4–8	3–3	2–8	5–4	4–5	—	3–3	1–5	5–5
San Diego	1–6	3–6	2–8	5–5	1–5	5–5	4–6	0–12	6–6	8–4	3–3	—	5–2	4–2
San Francisco	1–5	4–5	2–7	7–3	4–2	2–8	5–5	7–5	6–6	8–4	5–1	2–5	—	2–4
St. Louis	7–5	5–5	2–2–1	4–8	7–3	4–8	4–2	3–7	3–6	3–4	5–5	2–4	4–2	—

=== Notable transactions ===
- May 27, 1994: Kevin Maas was signed as a free agent by the Reds.
- May 29, 1994: Roberto Kelly and Roger Etheridge (minors) were traded by the Reds to the Atlanta Braves for Deion Sanders.

=== Roster ===
1994 Cincinnati Reds
Roster
Pitchers: 45 Jeff Brantley; 32 Tom Browning; 58 Héctor Carrasco; 53 Rich DeLucia; 55 Tim Fortugno; 39 Erik Hanson; 42 Kevin Jarvis; 31 Chuck McElroy; 40 Tim Pugh; 27 José Rijo; 44 John Roper; 47 Johnny Ruffin; 46 Pete Schourek; 34 Scott Service; 57 John Smiley; 48 Jerry Spradlin	Catchers: 33 Brian Dorsett; 9 Joe Oliver; 10 Eddie Taubensee; Infielders: 29 Bret Boone; 20 Jeff Branson; 21 Tony Fernández; 12 Willie Greene; 28 Lenny Harris; 11 Barry Larkin; 23 Hal Morris	Outfielders: 4 Jacob Brumfield; 22 Thomas Howard; 30 Brian Hunter; 30 Roberto Kelly; 7 Kevin Mitchell; 26 Steve Pegues; 12 Deion Sanders; 16 Reggie Sanders; 19 Jerome Walton	Manager: 15 Davey Johnson; Coaches: 8 Bob Boone (bench); 35 Don Gullett (pitching); 3 Grant Jackson (bullpen); 25 Ray Knight (third base/hitting); 2 Joel Youngblood (first base)

== Player stats ==
=== Batting ===
==== Starters by position ====
Note: Pos = Position; G = Games played; AB = At bats; H = Hits; Avg. = Batting average; HR = Home runs; RBI = Runs batted in

Pos	Player	G	AB	H	Avg.	HR	RBI
C	Brian Dorsett	76	216	53	.245	5	26
1B	Hal Morris	112	436	146	.335	10	78
2B	Bret Boone	108	381	122	.320	12	68
SS	Barry Larkin	110	427	119	.279	9	52
3B	Tony Fernández	104	366	102	.279	8	50
LF	Kevin Mitchell	95	310	101	.326	30	77
CF	Roberto Kelly	47	179	54	.302	3	21
RF	Reggie Sanders	107	400	105	.263	17	62

==== Other batters ====
Note: G = Games played; AB = At bats; H = Hits; Avg. = Batting average; HR = Home runs; RBI = Runs batted in

Player	G	AB	H	Avg.	HR	RBI
Deion Sanders	46	184	51	.277	0	7
Thomas Howard	83	178	47	.264	5	24
Ed Taubensee	61	177	52	.294	8	21
Jacob Brumfield	68	122	38	.311	4	11
Jeff Branson	58	109	31	.284	6	16
Lenny Harris	66	100	31	.310	0	14
Jerome Walton	46	68	21	.309	1	9
Willie Greene	16	37	8	.216	0	3
Brian Hunter	9	23	7	.304	4	10
Joe Oliver	6	19	4	.211	1	5
Steve Pegues	11	10	3	.300	0	0

=== Pitching ===
==== Starting pitchers ====
Note: G = Games pitched; IP = Innings pitched; W = Wins; L = Losses; ERA = Earned run average; SO = Strikeouts

Player	G	IP	W	L	ERA	SO
José Rijo	26	172.1	9	6	3.08	171
John Smiley	24	158.2	11	10	3.86	112
Erik Hanson	22	122.2	5	5	4.11	101
John Roper	16	92.0	6	2	4.50	51
Tim Pugh	10	47.2	3	3	6.04	24
Tom Browning	7	40.2	3	1	4.20	22

==== Other pitchers ====
Note: G = Games pitched; IP = Innings pitched; W = Wins; L = Losses; ERA = Earned run average; SO = Strikeouts

Player	G	IP	W	L	ERA	SO
Pete Schourek	22	81.1	7	2	4.09	69
Kevin Jarvis	6	17.2	1	1	7.13	10

==== Relief pitchers ====
Note: G = Games pitched; W = Wins; L = Losses; SV = Saves; ERA = Earned run average; SO = Strikeouts

Player	G	W	L	SV	ERA	SO
Jeff Brantley	50	6	6	15	2.48	63
Chuck McElroy	52	1	2	5	2.34	38
Johnny Ruffin	51	7	2	1	3.09	44
Hector Carrasco	45	5	6	6	2.24	41
Tim Fortugno	25	1	0	0	4.20	29
Rich DeLucia	8	0	0	0	4.22	15
Jerry Spradlin	6	0	0	0	10.13	4
Scott Service	6	1	2	0	7.36	5

== Farm system ==
Level	Team	League	Manager
AAA	Indianapolis Indians	American Association	Marc Bombard
AA	Chattanooga Lookouts	Southern League	Pat Kelly
A	Winston-Salem Spirits	Carolina League	Mark Berry
A	Charleston Wheelers	South Atlantic League	Tom Nieto
Rookie	Princeton Reds	Appalachian League	John Stearns
Rookie	Billings Mustangs	Pioneer League	Donnie Scott

LEAGUE CHAMPIONS: Indianapolis, Princeton, Billings
