= 1994 New York Mets season =

1994 New York Mets
- League: National League
- Division: East
- Ballpark: Shea Stadium
- City: New York City, New York
- Record: 55–58 (.487)
- Divisional place: 3rd
- Owners: Fred Wilpon and Nelson Doubleday, Jr.
- General manager: Joe McIlvaine
- Manager: Dallas Green
- Television: WWOR-TV/SportsChannel New York (Ralph Kiner, Tim McCarver, Fran Healy, Rusty Staub, Gary Thorne)
- Radio: WFAN (Bob Murphy, Gary Cohen, Howie Rose); WSKQ-FM (Spanish) (Juan Alicea, Renato Morffi)
- Stats: ESPN.com; Baseball Reference

The 1994 New York Mets season was the 33rd attempt at a regular season for the Mets. They went 55–58 and finished third in the National League East, eighteen and a half games behind the first place Montreal Expos. The Mets were managed by Dallas Green. They played home games at Shea Stadium. The season was cut short by the 1994 player's strike.

== Offseason ==
- October 4, 1993: Ced Landrum was released by the Mets.
- December 10, 1993: Randy Curtis (minors) and a player to be named later were traded by the Mets to the San Diego Padres for Frank Seminara, Tracy Sanders (minors) and a player to be named later. The deal was completed on December 13, with the Mets sending Marc Kroon to the Padres, and the Padres sending Pablo Martínez to the Mets.
- December 16, 1993: Jim Lindeman was signed as a free agent by the Mets.
- December 17, 1993: Doug Linton was signed as a free agent by the Mets.
- January 5, 1994: Vince Coleman and cash were traded by the Mets to the Kansas City Royals for Kevin McReynolds.
- February 18, 1994: Joe Dellicarri (minors) was traded by the Mets to the Detroit Tigers for Kevin Morgan.
- March 30, 1994: Anthony Young and Ottis Smith (minors) were traded by the Mets to the Chicago Cubs for José Vizcaíno.
- March 31, 1994: Alan Zinter was traded by the Mets to the Detroit Tigers for Rico Brogna.

== Regular season ==
By Friday, August 12, the Mets had compiled a 55–58 record through 113 games. They had scored 521 runs (4.48 per game) and allowed 526 runs (4.65 per game).

The Mets struggled in a few offensive areas, finishing 28th in the Majors in both stolen bases (25) and on-base percentage (.316). In spite of these numbers, the Mets had good power, slamming 117 home runs in 113 games, while grounding into just 70 double plays (the fewest in the Majors) and being hit by pitches an MLB-high 52 times.

Jeff Kent's .292 average led the team, as did his 68 RBI. Bobby Bonilla led five Mets with double-digit home run totals with 20. Ryan Thompson added 18, Todd Hundley 16, Kent 14, and David Segui 10.

After two injury-filled and disappointing years, Bret Saberhagen emerged as the ace of the Mets' staff with a 14–4 record. Bobby Jones recorded 12 wins in his first full season in the rotation, and John Franco stayed healthy enough to record 30 saves.

The news was not all positive. After struggling in his first seven starts, Dwight Gooden was suspended for 60 days after a positive test for cocaine. While on suspension he tested positive again and the suspension was extended to the entire 1995 season. Thus, 1994 was his final season as a Met.

=== Opening Day starters ===
- Jeromy Burnitz
- Bobby Jones
- Jeff Kent
- Kevin McReynolds
- David Segui
- Kelly Stinnett
- Ryan Thompson
- Fernando Viña
- José Vizcaíno

=== Season standings ===
NL East
Team	W	L	Pct.	GB	Home	Road
Montreal Expos	74	40	.649	—	32‍–‍20	42‍–‍20
Atlanta Braves	68	46	.596	6	31‍–‍24	37‍–‍22
New York Mets	55	58	.487	18½	23‍–‍30	32‍–‍28
Philadelphia Phillies	54	61	.470	20½	34‍–‍26	20‍–‍35
Florida Marlins	51	64	.443	23½	25‍–‍34	26‍–‍30

Division leaders
Team	W	L	Pct.
Montreal Expos	74	40	.649
Cincinnati Reds	66	48	.579
Los Angeles Dodgers	58	56	.509

Wild Card team	W	L	Pct.	GB
Atlanta Braves	68	46	0.597	—
Houston Astros	66	49	0.574	2 1/2
New York Mets	55	58	0.487	12 1/2
San Francisco Giants	55	60	0.478	13 1/2
Philadelphia Phillies	54	61	0.470	14 1/2
St. Louis Cardinals	53	61	0.465	15
Pittsburgh Pirates	53	61	0.465	15
Colorado Rockies	53	64	0.453	16 1/2
Florida Marlins	51	64	0.444	17 1/2
Chicago Cubs	49	64	0.434	18 1/2
San Diego Padres	47	70	0.402	22 1/2

=== Record vs. opponents ===
1994 National League record Source: MLB Standings Grid – 1994
Team	ATL	CHC	CIN	COL	FLA	HOU	LAD	MON	NYM	PHI	PIT	SD	SF	STL
Atlanta	—	4–2	5–5	8–2	8–4	3–3	6–0	4–5	5–4	6–3	3–9	6–1	5–1	5–7
Chicago	2–4	—	5–7	6–6	4–5	4–8	3–3	2–4	1–4	1–6	5–5	6–3	5–4	5–5
Cincinnati	5–5	7–5	—	4–4	7–5	4–6	3–6	4–2	2–4	4–2	9–3	8–2	7–2	2–2–1
Colorado	2–8	6–6	4–4	—	3–9	5–5	4–6	4–2	5–1	2–4	2–3	5–5	3–7	8–4
Florida	4–8	5–4	5–7	9–3	—	2–4	3–3	2–7	6–4	4–6	1–6	5–1	2–4	3–7
Houston	3–3	8–4	6–4	5–5	4–2	—	1–8	2–4	3–3	5–1	8–4	5–5	8–2	8–4
Los Angeles	0–6	3–3	6–3	6–4	3–3	8–1	—	3–9	6–6	7–5	3–3	6–4	5–5	2–4
Montreal	5–4	4–2	2–4	2–4	7–2	4–2	9–3	—	4–3	5–4	8–2	12–0	5–7	7–3
New York	4–5	4–1	4–2	1–5	4–6	3–3	6–6	3–4	—	4–6	4–5	6–6	6–6	6–3
Philadelphia	3-6	6–1	2–4	4–2	6–4	1–5	5–7	4–5	6–4	—	5–4	4–8	4–8	4–3
Pittsburgh	9–3	5–5	3–9	3–2	6–1	4–8	3–3	2–8	5–4	4–5	—	3–3	1–5	5–5
San Diego	1–6	3–6	2–8	5–5	1–5	5–5	4–6	0–12	6–6	8–4	3–3	—	5–2	4–2
San Francisco	1–5	4–5	2–7	7–3	4–2	2–8	5–5	7–5	6–6	8–4	5–1	2–5	—	2–4
St. Louis	7–5	5–5	2–2–1	4–8	7–3	4–8	4–2	3–7	3–6	3–4	5–5	2–4	4–2	—

=== Notable transactions ===
- April 29, 1994: Roger Mason was purchased by the New York Mets from the Philadelphia Phillies.
- June 14, 1994: Doug Dascenzo was signed as a free agent by the Mets.

== Roster ==
1994 New York Mets
Roster
Pitchers: 50 Juan Castillo; 31 John Franco; 16 Dwight Gooden; 45 Mauro Gozzo; 40 Eric Gunderson; 53 Eric Hillman; 13 Jonathan Hurst; 47 Jason Jacome; 28 Bobby Jones; 30 Doug Linton; 51 Mike Maddux; 39 Josías Manzanillo; 48 Roger Mason; 43 Mike Remlinger; 17 Bret Saberhagen; 34 Frank Seminara; 32 Pete Smith; 38 Dave Telgheder	Catchers: 9 Todd Hundley; 33 Kelly Stinnett; Infielders: 23 Tim Bogar; 25 Bobby Bonilla; 26 Rico Brogna; 12 Jeff Kent; 17,18 Jeff McKnight; 3 Luis Rivera; 10,21 David Segui; 1 Fernando Viña; 15 José Vizcaíno	Outfielders: 5 Jeromy Burnitz; 44 John Cangelosi; 19 Shawn Hare; 29 Jim Lindeman; 22 Kevin McReynolds; 6 Joe Orsulak; 11 Rick Parker; 20 Ryan Thompson	Manager: 46 Dallas Green; Coaches: 4 Mike Cubbage (third base); 55 Frank Howard (first base); 27 Tom McCraw (hitting); 52 Greg Pavlick (pitching); 8 Steve Swisher (bullpen); 7 Bobby Wine (bench)

== Player stats ==
=== Batting ===
==== Starters by position ====
Note: Pos = Position; G = Games played; AB = At bats; H = Hits; Avg. = Batting average; HR = Home runs; RBI = Runs batted in

Pos	Player	G	AB	H	Avg.	HR	RBI
C	Todd Hundley	91	291	69	.237	16	42
1B	David Segui	92	336	81	.241	10	43
2B	Jeff Kent	107	415	121	.292	14	68
SS	José Vizcaíno	103	410	105	.256	3	33
3B	Bobby Bonilla	108	403	117	.290	20	67
LF	Kevin McReynolds	51	180	46	.256	4	21
CF	Ryan Thompson	98	334	75	.225	18	59
RF	Joe Orsulak	96	292	76	.260	8	42

==== Other batters ====
Note: G = Games played; AB = At bats; H = Hits; Avg. = Batting average; HR = Home runs; RBI = Runs batted in

Player	G	AB	H	Avg.	HR	RBI
Kelly Stinnett	47	150	38	.253	2	14
Jeromy Burnitz	45	143	34	.238	3	15
Jim Lindeman	52	137	37	.270	7	20
Rico Brogna	39	131	46	.351	7	20
Fernando Viña	79	124	31	.250	0	6
John Cangelosi	62	111	28	.252	0	4
Tim Bogar	50	52	8	.154	2	5
Luis Rivera	32	43	12	.279	3	5
Shawn Hare	22	40	9	.225	0	2
Jeff McKnight	31	27	4	.148	0	2
Rick Parker	8	16	1	.063	0	0

=== Pitching ===
==== Starting pitchers ====
Note: G = Games pitched; IP = Innings pitched; W = Wins; L = Losses; ERA = Earned run average; SO = Strikeouts

Player	G	IP	W	L	ERA	SO
Bret Saberhagen	24	177.1	14	4	2.74	143
Bobby Jones	24	160.0	12	7	3.15	80
Pete Smith	21	131.1	4	10	5.55	62
Mike Remlinger	10	54.2	1	5	4.61	33
Jason Jacome	8	54.0	4	3	2.67	30
Dwight Gooden	7	41.1	3	4	6.31	40
Juan Castillo	2	11.2	0	0	6.94	1

==== Other pitchers ====
Note: G = Games pitched; IP = Innings pitched; W = Wins; L = Losses; ERA = Earned run average; SO = Strikeouts

Player	G	IP	W	L	ERA	SO
Mauro Gozzo	23	69.0	3	5	4.83	33
Eric Hillman	11	34.2	0	3	7.79	20

==== Relief pitchers ====
Note: G = Games pitched; W = Wins; L = Losses; SV = Saves; ERA = Earned run average; SO = Strikeouts

Player	G	W	L	SV	ERA	SO
John Franco	47	1	4	30	2.70	42
Roger Mason	41	2	4	1	3.51	26
Josias Manzanillo	37	3	2	2	2.66	48
Doug Linton	32	6	2	0	4.47	29
Mike Maddux	27	2	1	2	5.11	32
Eric Gunderson	14	0	0	0	0.00	4
Frank Seminara	10	0	2	0	5.82	7
Jonathan Hurst	7	0	1	0	12.60	6
Dave Telgheder	6	0	1	0	7.20	4

== Farm system ==
Level	Team	League	Manager
AAA	Norfolk Tides	International League	Bobby Valentine
AA	Binghamton Mets	Eastern League	John Tamargo
A	St. Lucie Mets	Florida State League	Rafael Landestoy
A	Columbia Bombers	South Atlantic League	Ron Washington
A-Short Season	Pittsfield Mets	New York–Penn League	Howie Freiling
Rookie	Kingsport Mets	Appalachian League	Ron Gideon
Rookie	GCL Mets	Gulf Coast League	Junior Roman

LEAGUE CHAMPIONS: Binghamton
