= 1994 Giants season =

1994 Giants season may refer to:

- 1994 San Francisco Giants season
- 1994 New York Giants season
