= Greg O'Halloran (baseball) =

Canadian baseball player (born 1968)

- Catcher
- Born: May 21, 1968 (age 57); Toronto, Ontario, Canada
- Batted: Left Threw: Right

MLB debut
- May 16, 1994, for the Florida Marlins

Last MLB appearance
- August 6, 1994, for the Florida Marlins

MLB statistics
- Batting average: .182
- Home runs: 0
- Runs batted in: 1
- Stats at Baseball Reference

Teams
- Florida Marlins (1994)

Gregory Joseph O'Halloran (born May 21, 1968) is a Canadian former professional baseball catcher.

O'Halloran attended a high school in Mississauga, Ontario which did not field a baseball team; he instead played baseball in competitive summer leagues. As a child, he thought of baseball simply as "something I did in the summer when I wasn't playing hockey."

O'Halloran played college baseball at Orange Coast College in California and accepted a scholarship to continue his college baseball career at Illinois. In advance of the 1988 Major League Baseball draft, he told all interested teams, except for his childhood favorites, the Toronto Blue Jays, that he intended to play at Illinois even if drafted. With their pick in the 32nd round, the Blue Jays selected and signed O'Halloran.

In 1988, he played for the Canada national baseball team at the Baseball World Cup and Summer Olympics.

In November 1993, following the inaugural season of the Florida Marlins, the Blue Jays sold O'Halloran's contract to the Marlins. At the time, he was the fourth player on their catching depth chart behind Pat Borders, Randy Knorr and Carlos Delgado.

He played for the Marlins for 12 games during the 1994 season, serving mostly as a pinch hitter.

His son, Connor, was selected by the Toronto Blue Jays in the fifth round of the 2023 Major League Baseball draft.
