= Ray Holbert =

American baseball player (born 1970)

- Shortstop
- Born: September 25, 1970 (age 55); Torrance, California, U.S.
- Batted: Right Threw: Right

MLB debut
- May 2, 1994, for the San Diego Padres

Last MLB appearance
- June 18, 2000, for the Kansas City Royals

MLB statistics
- Batting average: .223
- Home runs: 2
- Runs batted in: 11
- Stats at Baseball Reference

Teams
- San Diego Padres (1994–1995); Atlanta Braves (1998); Montreal Expos (1998); Kansas City Royals (1999–2000)

Ray Arthur Holbert III (born September 25, 1970) is an American former Major League Baseball player. He is the brother of fellow major league infielder Aaron Holbert

An infielder, Holbert played for the San Diego Padres (1994–95), Atlanta Braves (1998), Montreal Expos (1998), and Kansas City Royals (1999–2000).
