= 1994 Chicago Cubs season =

1994 Chicago Cubs
- League: National League
- Division: Central
- Ballpark: Wrigley Field
- City: Chicago
- Record: 49–64 (.434)
- Divisional place: 5th
- Owners: Tribune Company
- General managers: Larry Himes
- Managers: Tom Trebelhorn
- Television: WGN-TV/Superstation WGN (Harry Caray, Steve Stone, Thom Brennaman, Wayne Larrivee)
- Radio: WGN (Thom Brennaman, Ron Santo, Harry Caray)
- Stats: ESPN.com; Baseball Reference

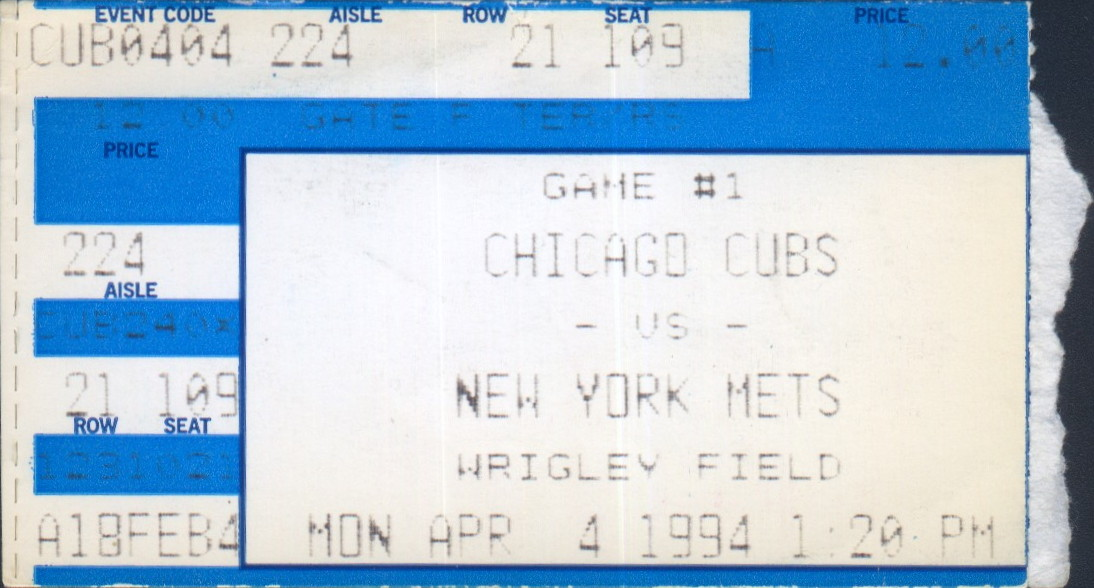
A ticket for the Cubs' 1994 Opening Day game against the New York Mets.

The 1994 Chicago Cubs season was the 123rd season of the Chicago Cubs franchise, the 119th in the National League and the 79th at Wrigley Field. The Cubs finished the shortened season fifth and last in the National League Central with a record of 49–64.

One of the highlights of the season was Karl "Tuffy" Rhodes hitting three home runs on Opening Day – all off Dwight Gooden of the New York Mets. The Cubs still lost the game 12–8. Rhodes would only hit five more homers that season and the Cubs would set a record by losing their first 12 home games.

== Offseason ==
- October 12, 1993: Steve Lake was released by the Chicago Cubs.
- November 24, 1993: Glenallen Hill signed as a free agent with the Chicago Cubs.
- December 14, 1993: Mike Maksudian was signed as a free agent with the Chicago Cubs.
- January 24, 1994: Dave Otto was signed as a free agent with the Chicago Cubs.
- March 30, 1994: Anthony Young was traded by the New York Mets with Ottis Smith (minors) to the Chicago Cubs for José Vizcaíno.

== Regular season ==
The Cubs finished the strike-shortened season with a 49–64 record. They scored 500 runs (4.42 per game) and allowed 549 runs (4.86 per game).

One of the most-memorable moments in Cubs history occurred April 29. 1994, after a heart-breaking 6–5 loss to the Colorado Rockies at Wrigley Field. The Cubs loaded the bases with one out in the bottom of the ninth only to have Glenallen Hill swing at the first pitch he saw and ground into a game-ending double play. The loss was the ninth consecutive home defeat for the Cubs to start the season and dropped the club to 6–15. Manager Tom Trebelhorn had vowed to meet fans outside the ballpark if the Cubs lost another home game and was true to his word, wading into a crowd of some 200 angry fans gathered at a fire station on Waveland Avenue just outside Wrigley's left-field wall. The confrontation started ugly, but within a half hour, Trebelhorn, who was known for his quick humor and good nature, won over most of his detractors. The team went on to lose three more home games before snapping the record streak with a 5–2 win over the Cincinnati Reds on May 4, 1994, but by then Trebelhorn's "Firehouse Chat" was a memorable moment in Cubs' history. The season, which ended when Major League players went on 1994–95 Major League Baseball strike Aug 12, was Trebelhorn's only as manager of the Cubs. He was replaced in 1995 by Jim Riggleman.

=== Game log ===
1994 Regular Season Game Log (49–64) (Home: 20–39; Road: 29–25)
April (6–15) (Home: 0–9; Road: 6–6)

#	Date	Opponent	Score	Win	Loss	Save	Attendance	Record	Report
1	April 4	Mets							
2	April 5	Mets							
3	April 6	Mets							
4	April 8	@ Expos	4–0	Trachsel (1–0)	Martínez (0–1)		47,001	1–3	Boxscore
5	April 9	@ Expos	4–3	Plesac (1–0)	Wetteland (0–1)	Myers (1)	38,635	2–3	Boxscore
6	April 10	@ Expos	2–8	Hill (2–0)	Guzmán (0–2)		16,183	2–4	Boxscore
7	April 11	@ Mets							
8	April 14	@ Mets							
9	April 15	Braves							
10	April 16	Braves							
11	April 17	Braves							
12	April 19	Astros							
13	April 20	Astros							
14	April 22	@ Rockies							
15	April 23	@ Rockies							
16	April 24	@ Rockies							
17	April 25	@ Reds							
18	April 26	@ Reds							
19	April 27	@ Astros							
20	April 28	@ Astros							
21	April 29	Rockies							

May (16–12) (Home: 9–6; Road: 7–6)

#	Date	Opponent	Score	Win	Loss	Save	Attendance	Record	Report
22	May 1	Rockies							
23	May 2	Reds							
24	May 3	Reds							
25	May 4	Reds							
26	May 6	@ Pirates							
27	May 8	@ Pirates							
28	May 8	@ Pirates							
29	May 9	@ Cardinals							
30	May 10	@ Cardinals							
31	May 11	@ Cardinals							
32	May 12	@ Cardinals							
33	May 13	Marlins							
34	May 14	Marlins							
35	May 15	Marlins							
36	May 16	Padres							
37	May 17	Padres							
38	May 18	Padres							
39	May 20	Giants							
40	May 21	Giants							
41	May 22	Giants							
42	May 23	@ Dodgers							
43	May 24	@ Dodgers							
44	May 25	@ Dodgers							
45	May 27	@ Braves							
46	May 28	@ Braves							
47	May 29	@ Braves							
48	May 30	Phillies							
49	May 31	Phillies							

June (10–16) (Home: 4–10; Road: 6–6)

#	Date	Opponent	Score	Win	Loss	Save	Attendance	Record	Report
50	June 1	Phillies							
51	June 2	Phillies							
52	June 3	Expos	1–3	Shaw (3–1)	Crim (2–1)	Wetteland (7)	26,037	22–30	Boxscore
53	June 4	Expos	1–6	Martínez (4–4)	Banks (6–5)		37,187	22–31	Boxscore
54	June 5	Expos	5–10 (13)	Heredia (1–2)	Otto (0–1)		34,181	22–32	Boxscore
55	June 6	@ Phillies							
56	June 7	@ Phillies							
57	June 8	@ Phillies							
58	June 10	Dodgers							
59	June 11	Dodgers							
60	June 12	Dodgers							
61	June 14	@ Padres							
62	June 15	@ Padres							
63	June 16	@ Padres							
64	June 17	@ Giants							
65	June 18	@ Giants							
66	June 19	@ Giants							
67	June 21	@ Marlins							
68	June 23	@ Marlins							
69	June 24	Cardinals							
70	June 25	Cardinals							
71	June 26	Cardinals							
72	June 27	Pirates							
73	June 28	Pirates							
74	June 29	Pirates							
75	June 30	@ Astros							

July (15–13) (Home: 5–6; Road: 10–7)

#	Date	Opponent	Score	Win	Loss	Save	Attendance	Record	Report
76	July 1	@ Astros							
77	July 2	@ Astros							
78	July 3	@ Astros							
79	July 4	Rockies							
80	July 4	Rockies							
81	July 5	Rockies							
82	July 6	Rockies							
83	July 7	Astros							
84	July 8	Astros							
85	July 9	Astros							
86	July 10	Astros							
87	July 14	@ Reds							
88	July 15	@ Reds							
89	July 16	@ Reds							
90	July 17	@ Reds							
91	July 18	@ Rockies							
92	July 19	@ Rockies							
93	July 20	@ Rockies							
94	July 22	Reds							
95	July 23	Reds							
96	July 24	Reds							
97	July 25	@ Pirates							
98	July 26	@ Pirates							
99	July 27	@ Pirates							
100	July 28	@ Pirates							
101	July 29	@ Cardinals							
102	July 30	@ Cardinals							
103	July 31	@ Cardinals							

August (2–8) (Home: 2–8)

#	Date	Opponent	Score	Win	Loss	Save	Attendance	Record	Report
104	August 1	Marlins							
105	August 2	Marlins							
106	August 3	Marlins							
107	August 4	Marlins							
108	August 5	Padres							
109	August 6	Padres							
110	August 7	Padres							
111	August 8	Giants							
112	August 9	Giants							
113	August 10	Giants							

Legend
Cubs win	Cubs loss	All-Star Game	Game postponed

=== Season standings ===
NL Central
Team	W	L	Pct.	GB	Home	Road
Cincinnati Reds	66	48	.579	—	37‍–‍22	29‍–‍26
Houston Astros	66	49	.574	½	37‍–‍22	29‍–‍27
Pittsburgh Pirates	53	61	.465	13	32‍–‍29	21‍–‍32
St. Louis Cardinals	53	61	.465	13	23‍–‍33	30‍–‍28
Chicago Cubs	49	64	.434	16½	20‍–‍39	29‍–‍25

Division leaders
Team	W	L	Pct.
Montreal Expos	74	40	.649
Cincinnati Reds	66	48	.579
Los Angeles Dodgers	58	56	.509

Wild Card team	W	L	Pct.	GB
Atlanta Braves	68	46	0.597	—
Houston Astros	66	49	0.574	2 1/2
New York Mets	55	58	0.487	12 1/2
San Francisco Giants	55	60	0.478	13 1/2
Philadelphia Phillies	54	61	0.470	14 1/2
St. Louis Cardinals	53	61	0.465	15
Pittsburgh Pirates	53	61	0.465	15
Colorado Rockies	53	64	0.453	16 1/2
Florida Marlins	51	64	0.444	17 1/2
Chicago Cubs	49	64	0.434	18 1/2
San Diego Padres	47	70	0.402	22 1/2

=== Record vs. opponents ===
1994 National League record Source: MLB Standings Grid – 1994
Team	ATL	CHC	CIN	COL	FLA	HOU	LAD	MON	NYM	PHI	PIT	SD	SF	STL
Atlanta	—	4–2	5–5	8–2	8–4	3–3	6–0	4–5	5–4	6–3	3–9	6–1	5–1	5–7
Chicago	2–4	—	5–7	6–6	4–5	4–8	3–3	2–4	1–4	1–6	5–5	6–3	5–4	5–5
Cincinnati	5–5	7–5	—	4–4	7–5	4–6	3–6	4–2	2–4	4–2	9–3	8–2	7–2	2–2–1
Colorado	2–8	6–6	4–4	—	3–9	5–5	4–6	4–2	5–1	2–4	2–3	5–5	3–7	8–4
Florida	4–8	5–4	5–7	9–3	—	2–4	3–3	2–7	6–4	4–6	1–6	5–1	2–4	3–7
Houston	3–3	8–4	6–4	5–5	4–2	—	1–8	2–4	3–3	5–1	8–4	5–5	8–2	8–4
Los Angeles	0–6	3–3	6–3	6–4	3–3	8–1	—	3–9	6–6	7–5	3–3	6–4	5–5	2–4
Montreal	5–4	4–2	2–4	2–4	7–2	4–2	9–3	—	4–3	5–4	8–2	12–0	5–7	7–3
New York	4–5	4–1	4–2	1–5	4–6	3–3	6–6	3–4	—	4–6	4–5	6–6	6–6	6–3
Philadelphia	3-6	6–1	2–4	4–2	6–4	1–5	5–7	4–5	6–4	—	5–4	4–8	4–8	4–3
Pittsburgh	9–3	5–5	3–9	3–2	6–1	4–8	3–3	2–8	5–4	4–5	—	3–3	1–5	5–5
San Diego	1–6	3–6	2–8	5–5	1–5	5–5	4–6	0–12	6–6	8–4	3–3	—	5–2	4–2
San Francisco	1–5	4–5	2–7	7–3	4–2	2–8	5–5	7–5	6–6	8–4	5–1	2–5	—	2–4
St. Louis	7–5	5–5	2–2–1	4–8	7–3	4–8	4–2	3–7	3–6	3–4	5–5	2–4	4–2	—

=== Notable transactions ===
- May 16, 1994: Willie Wilson was released by the Chicago Cubs.
- July 27, 1994: Mike Sharperson signed as a free agent with the Chicago Cubs.

== Roster ==
1994 Chicago Cubs
Roster
Pitchers: 35 Willie Banks; 38 José Bautista; 47 Shawn Boskie; 52 Jim Bullinger; 49 Frank Castillo; 32 Chuck Crim; 31 Kevin Foster; 29 José Guzmán; 51 Blaise Ilsley; 35 Mike Morgan; 28 Randy Myers; 53 Dave Otto; 47 Donn Pall; 37 Dan Plesac; 46 Steve Trachsel; 45 Randy Veres; 13 Turk Wendell; 16 Anthony Young	Catchers: 8 Mark Parent; 2 Rick Wilkins; Infielders: 24 Steve Buechele; 12 Shawon Dunston; 17 Mark Grace; 20 Todd Haney; 18 José Hernández; 7 Mike Maksudian; 11 Rey Sánchez; 23 Ryne Sandberg; 22 Eduardo Zambrano	Outfielders: 4 Glenallen Hill; 27 Derrick May; 25 Tuffy Rhodes; 19 Kevin Roberson; 21 Sammy Sosa; 6 Willie Wilson	Manager: 41 Tom Trebelhorn; Coaches: 15 Chuck Cottier (bench); 42 Moe Drabowsky (pitching); 43 Marv Foley (bullpen); 3 José Martínez (first base); 40 Tony Muser (third base); 26 Billy Williams (hitting)

== Player stats ==
= Indicates team leader

=== Batting ===
==== Starters by position ====
Note: Pos = Position; G = Games played; AB = At bats; H = Hits; Avg. = Batting average; HR = Home runs; RBI = Runs batted in

Pos	Player	G	AB	H	Avg.	HR	RBI
C	Rick Wilkins	100	313	71	.227	7	39
1B	Mark Grace	106	403	120	.298	6	44
2B	Ryne Sandberg	57	223	53	.238	5	24
SS	Shawon Dunston	88	331	92	.278	11	35
3B	Steve Buechele	104	339	82	.242	14	52
LF	Derrick May	100	345	98	.284	8	51
CF	Tuffy Rhodes	95	269	63	.234	8	19
RF	Sammy Sosa	105	426	128	.300	25	70

==== Other batters ====
Note: G = Games played; AB = At bats; H = Hits; Avg. = Batting average; HR = Home runs; RBI = Runs batted in

Player	G	AB	H	Avg.	HR	RBI
Rey Sánchez	96	291	83	.285	0	24
Glenallen Hill	89	269	80	.297	10	38
José Hernández	56	132	32	.242	1	9
Eduardo Zambrano	67	116	30	.259	6	18
Mark Parent	44	99	26	.263	3	16
Kevin Roberson	44	55	12	.218	4	9
Todd Haney	17	37	6	.162	1	2
Mike Maksudian	26	26	7	.269	0	4
Willie Wilson	17	21	5	.238	0	0

=== Pitching ===
==== Starting pitchers ====
Note: G = Games pitched; IP = Innings pitched; W = Wins; L = Losses; ERA = Earned run average; SO = Strikeouts

Player	G	IP	W	L	ERA	SO
Steve Trachsel	22	146.0	9	7	3.21	108
Willie Banks	23	138.1	8	12	5.40	91
Anthony Young	20	114.2	4	6	3.92	65
Kevin Foster	13	81.0	3	4	2.89	75
Mike Morgan	15	80.2	2	10	6.69	57
Frank Castillo	4	23.0	2	1	4.30	19
José Guzmán	4	19.2	2	2	9.15	11

==== Other pitchers ====
Note: G = Games pitched; IP = Innings pitched; W = Wins; L = Losses; ERA = Earned run average; SO = Strikeouts

Player	G	IP	W	L	ERA	SO
Jim Bullinger	33	100.0	6	2	3.60	72
Turk Wendell	6	14.1	0	1	11.93	9

==== Relief pitchers ====
Note: G = Games pitched; W = Wins; L = Losses; SV = Saves; ERA = Earned run average; SO = Strikeouts

Player	G	W	L	SV	ERA	SO
Randy Myers	38	1	5	21	3.79	32
José Bautista	58	4	5	1	3.39	45
Dan Plesac	54	2	3	1	4.61	53
Chuck Crim	49	5	4	2	4.48	43
Dave Otto	36	0	1	0	3.80	19
Blaise Ilsley	10	0	0	0	7.80	9
Randy Veres	10	1	1	0	5.59	5
Donn Pall	2	0	0	0	4.50	2
Shawn Boskie	2	0	0	0	0.00	2

== Farm system ==
Level	Team	League	Manager
AAA	Iowa Cubs	American Association	Rick Patterson
AA	Orlando Cubs	Southern League	Dave Trembley
A	Daytona Cubs	Florida State League	Ken Bolek
A	Kane County Cougars	Midwest League	Steve Roadcap
A-Short Season	Williamsport Cubs	New York–Penn League	Jerry Weinstein
Rookie	Huntington Cubs	Appalachian League	Steve Kolinsky
Rookie	GCL Cubs	Gulf Coast League	Phil Bradley
