= Juan Castillo (pitcher) =

Venezuelan baseball player (born 1970)

- Pitcher
- Born: June 23, 1970 (age 55); Caracas, Venezuela
- Batted: Right Threw: Right

MLB debut
- July 26, 1994, for the New York Mets

Last MLB appearance
- July 31, 1994, for the New York Mets

MLB statistics
- Win–loss record: 0–0
- Earned run average: 6.94
- Strikeouts: 1
- Stats at Baseball Reference

Teams
- New York Mets (1994)

Juan Francisco Castillo Azdura [cas-teel'-lyo / aas-doo'-rah] (born June 23, 1970) is a Venezuelan former Major League Baseball right-handed relief pitcher who played for the New York Mets in 1994.

Castillo compiled a career 0–0 record with 1 strikeout and a 6.94 of ERA in 11 innings.

== See also ==
- List of players from Venezuela in Major League Baseball
