= Ray McDavid =

American baseball player (born 1971)

- Outfielder
- Born: July 20, 1971 (age 53); San Diego, California, U.S.
- Batted: Left Threw: Right

MLB debut
- July 15, 1994, for the San Diego Padres

Last MLB appearance
- October 1, 1995, for the San Diego Padres

MLB statistics
- Batting average: .222
- Hits: 10
- Runs batted in: 2
- Stats at Baseball Reference

Teams
- San Diego Padres (1994–1995)

Ray Darnell McDavid (born July 20, 1971) is an American former professional baseball outfielder. He played for the San Diego Padres of Major League Baseball (MLB) from 1994 to 1995.

He was considered one of the top prospects in baseball in 1992, 1993 and 1994. In his first two years playing in the Padres' minor league system in 1991 and 1992, he drew 200 bases on balls and stole 103 bases.
