= 1994 Los Angeles Dodgers season =

1994 Los Angeles Dodgers
- League: National League
- Division: West
- Ballpark: Dodger Stadium
- City: Los Angeles
- Record: 58–56 (.509)
- Divisional place: 1st
- Owners: Peter O'Malley
- General managers: Fred Claire
- Managers: Tommy Lasorda
- Television: KTLA (5)
- Radio: KABC (AM) (Vin Scully, Ross Porter, Rick Monday); KWKW (Jaime Jarrín, René Cárdenas)

The 1994 Los Angeles Dodgers season was the 105th for the franchise in Major League Baseball and their 37th season in Los Angeles, California.

The Dodgers were leading the National League West when the players strike halted the season in August.

== Offseason ==
- November 17, 1993: Acquired Delino DeShields from the Montreal Expos for Pedro Martínez
- December 27, 1993: Acquired Ron Coomer from the Chicago White Sox for Isidro Márquez
- March 28, 1994: Acquired Al Osuna from the Houston Astros for James Daspit

== Regular season ==
The Dodgers had compiled a 58-56 record through 114 games by Friday, August 12. They had scored 532 runs (4.67 per game) and allowed 509 runs (4.46 per game).

=== Season standings ===
NL West
Team	W	L	Pct.	GB	Home	Road
Los Angeles Dodgers	58	56	.509	—	33‍–‍22	25‍–‍34
San Francisco Giants	55	60	.478	3½	29‍–‍31	26‍–‍29
Colorado Rockies	53	64	.453	6½	25‍–‍32	28‍–‍32
San Diego Padres	47	70	.402	12½	26‍–‍31	21‍–‍39

=== Record vs. opponents ===
1994 National League record Source: MLB Standings Grid – 1994
Team	ATL	CHC	CIN	COL	FLA	HOU	LAD	MON	NYM	PHI	PIT	SD	SF	STL
Atlanta	—	4–2	5–5	8–2	8–4	3–3	6–0	4–5	5–4	6–3	3–9	6–1	5–1	5–7
Chicago	2–4	—	5–7	6–6	4–5	4–8	3–3	2–4	1–4	1–6	5–5	6–3	5–4	5–5
Cincinnati	5–5	7–5	—	4–4	7–5	4–6	3–6	4–2	2–4	4–2	9–3	8–2	7–2	2–2–1
Colorado	2–8	6–6	4–4	—	3–9	5–5	4–6	4–2	5–1	2–4	2–3	5–5	3–7	8–4
Florida	4–8	5–4	5–7	9–3	—	2–4	3–3	2–7	6–4	4–6	1–6	5–1	2–4	3–7
Houston	3–3	8–4	6–4	5–5	4–2	—	1–8	2–4	3–3	5–1	8–4	5–5	8–2	8–4
Los Angeles	0–6	3–3	6–3	6–4	3–3	8–1	—	3–9	6–6	7–5	3–3	6–4	5–5	2–4
Montreal	5–4	4–2	2–4	2–4	7–2	4–2	9–3	—	4–3	5–4	8–2	12–0	5–7	7–3
New York	4–5	4–1	4–2	1–5	4–6	3–3	6–6	3–4	—	4–6	4–5	6–6	6–6	6–3
Philadelphia	3-6	6–1	2–4	4–2	6–4	1–5	5–7	4–5	6–4	—	5–4	4–8	4–8	4–3
Pittsburgh	9–3	5–5	3–9	3–2	6–1	4–8	3–3	2–8	5–4	4–5	—	3–3	1–5	5–5
San Diego	1–6	3–6	2–8	5–5	1–5	5–5	4–6	0–12	6–6	8–4	3–3	—	5–2	4–2
San Francisco	1–5	4–5	2–7	7–3	4–2	2–8	5–5	7–5	6–6	8–4	5–1	2–5	—	2–4
St. Louis	7–5	5–5	2–2–1	4–8	7–3	4–8	4–2	3–7	3–6	3–4	5–5	2–4	4–2	—

=== Opening Day lineup ===
Opening Day starters
Name	Position
Delino DeShields	Second baseman
Brett Butler	Center fielder
Mike Piazza	Catcher
Eric Karros	First baseman
Tim Wallach	Third baseman
Henry Rodríguez	Left fielder
Raúl Mondesí	Right fielder
José Offerman	Shortstop
Orel Hershiser	Starting pitcher

=== Notable transactions ===
- June 16, 1994: Acquired Brian Barnes from the Cleveland Indians for Eddie Lantigua

=== Roster ===
1994 Los Angeles Dodgers
Roster
Pitchers: 56 Pedro Astacio; 52 Brian Barnes; 49 Tom Candiotti; 54 Omar Daal; 37 Darren Dreifort; 35 Jim Gott; 46 Kevin Gross; 55 Orel Hershiser; 48 Ramón Martínez; 17 Roger McDowell; 45 Al Osuna; 61 Chan Ho Park; 57 Rudy Seánez; 59 Ismael Valdes; 47 Gary Wayne; 38 Todd Worrell	Catchers: 26 Carlos Hernández; 31 Mike Piazza; 15 Tom Prince; Infielders: 21 Rafael Bournigal; 14 Delino DeShields; 15 Dave Hansen; 33 Garey Ingram; 23 Eric Karros; 30 José Offerman; 60 Eddie Pye; 12 Jeff Treadway; 29 Tim Wallach	Outfielders: 7 Billy Ashley; 22 Brett Butler; 10 Chris Gwynn; 43 Raúl Mondesí; 40 Henry Rodríguez; 28 Cory Snyder; 20 Mitch Webster	Manager: 2 Tommy Lasorda; Coaches: 8 Joey Amalfitano (third base); 58 Mark Cresse (bullpen); 11 Manny Mota; 16 Ron Perranoski (pitching); 18 Bill Russell (bench); 9 Reggie Smith (hitting/1st base)

== Starting Pitchers stats ==
Note: G = Games pitched; GS = Games started; IP = Innings pitched; W/L = Wins/Losses; ERA = Earned run average; BB = Walks allowed; SO = Strikeouts; CG = Complete games

Name	G	GS	IP	W/L	ERA	BB	SO	CG
Ramón Martínez	24	24	170.0	12-7	3.97	56	119	4
Kevin Gross	25	23	157.3	9-7	3.60	11	43	1
Tom Candiotti	23	22	153.0	7-7	4.12	54	102	5
Pedro Astacio	23	23	149.0	6-8	4.29	18	47	3
Orel Hershiser	21	21	135.3	6-6	3.79	42	72	1

== Relief Pitchers stats ==
Note: G = Games pitched; GS = Games started; IP = Innings pitched; W/L = Wins/Losses; ERA = Earned run average; BB = Walks allowed; SO = Strikeouts; SV = Saves

Name	G	GS	IP	W/L	ERA	BB	SO	SV
Todd Worrell	38	0	42.0	6-5	4.29	12	44	11
Jim Gott	37	0	36.3	5-3	5.94	20	29	2
Roger McDowell	32	0	41.3	0-3	5.23	22	29	0
Darren Dreifort	27	0	29.0	0-5	6.21	15	22	6
Omar Daal	24	0	13.7	0-0	3.29	5	9	0
Ismael Valdez	21	1	28.3	3-1	3.18	10	28	0
Gary Wayne	19	0	17.3	1-3	4.67	6	10	0
Rudy Seánez	17	0	23.7	1-1	2.66	9	18	0
Al Osuna	15	0	8.7	2-0	6.23	4	7	0
Brian Barnes	5	0	5.0	0-0	7.20	4	5	0
Chan Ho Park	2	0	4.0	0-0	11.25	5	6	0

== Batting Stats ==
Note: Pos = Position; G = Games played; AB = At bats; Avg. = Batting average; R = Runs scored; H = Hits; HR = Home runs; RBI = Runs batted in; SB = Stolen bases

Name	Pos	G	AB	Avg.	R	H	HR	RBI	SB
Mike Piazza	C	107	405	.319	64	129	24	92	1
Carlos Hernández	C	32	64	.219	6	14	2	6	0
Tom Prince	C	3	6	.333	2	2	0	1	0
Eric Karros	1B	111	406	.266	51	108	14	46	2
Delino DeShields	2B/SS	89	320	.250	51	80	2	33	27
José Offerman	SS	72	243	.210	27	51	1	25	2
Tim Wallach	3B	113	414	.280	68	116	23	78	0
Rafael Bournigal	SS	40	116	.224	2	26	0	11	0
Garey Ingram	2B	26	78	.282	10	22	3	8	0
Jeff Treadway	2B/3B	52	67	.299	14	20	0	5	1
Dave Hansen	3B	40	44	.341	3	15	0	5	0
Eddie Pye	2B/SS	7	10	.100	2	1	0	0	0
Raúl Mondesí	RF	112	434	.306	63	133	16	56	11
Brett Butler	CF	111	417	.314	79	131	8	33	27
Henry Rodríguez	OF	104	306	.268	33	82	8	49	0
Cory Snyder	OF	73	153	.235	18	36	6	18	1
Mitch Webster	OF	82	84	.274	16	23	4	13	1
Chris Gwynn	OF	58	71	.268	9	19	3	13	0
Billy Ashley	LF	2	6	.333	0	2	0	0	0

== 1994 Awards ==
- 1994 Major League Baseball All-Star Game
  - Mike Piazza starter
- Rookie of the Year Award
  - Raúl Mondesí
- Comeback Player of the Year
  - Tim Wallach
- Baseball Digest Rookie All-Star
  - Raúl Mondesí
- Players Choice: NL Outstanding Rookie
  - Raúl Mondesí
- Silver Slugger Award
  - Mike Piazza
- TSN NL Rookie of the Year
  - Raúl Mondesí
- TSN National League All-Star
  - Mike Piazza
- NL Player of the Month
  - Mike Piazza (May 1994)
- NL Player of the Week
  - Mike Piazza (May 16–22)

== Farm system ==
Level	Team	League	Manager
**AAA**	**Albuquerque Dukes**	**Pacific Coast League**	**Rick Dempsey**
AA	San Antonio Missions	Texas League	Tom Beyers
High A	Bakersfield Dodgers	California League	John Shelby
High A	Vero Beach Dodgers	Florida State League	Jon Debus
A-Short Season	Yakima Bears	Northwest League	Joe Vavra
Rookie	Great Falls Dodgers	Pioneer League	Ron Roenicke
Rookie	DSL Dodgers; DSL Dodgers 2	Dominican Summer League	

Teams in BOLD won League Championships

== Major League Baseball draft ==
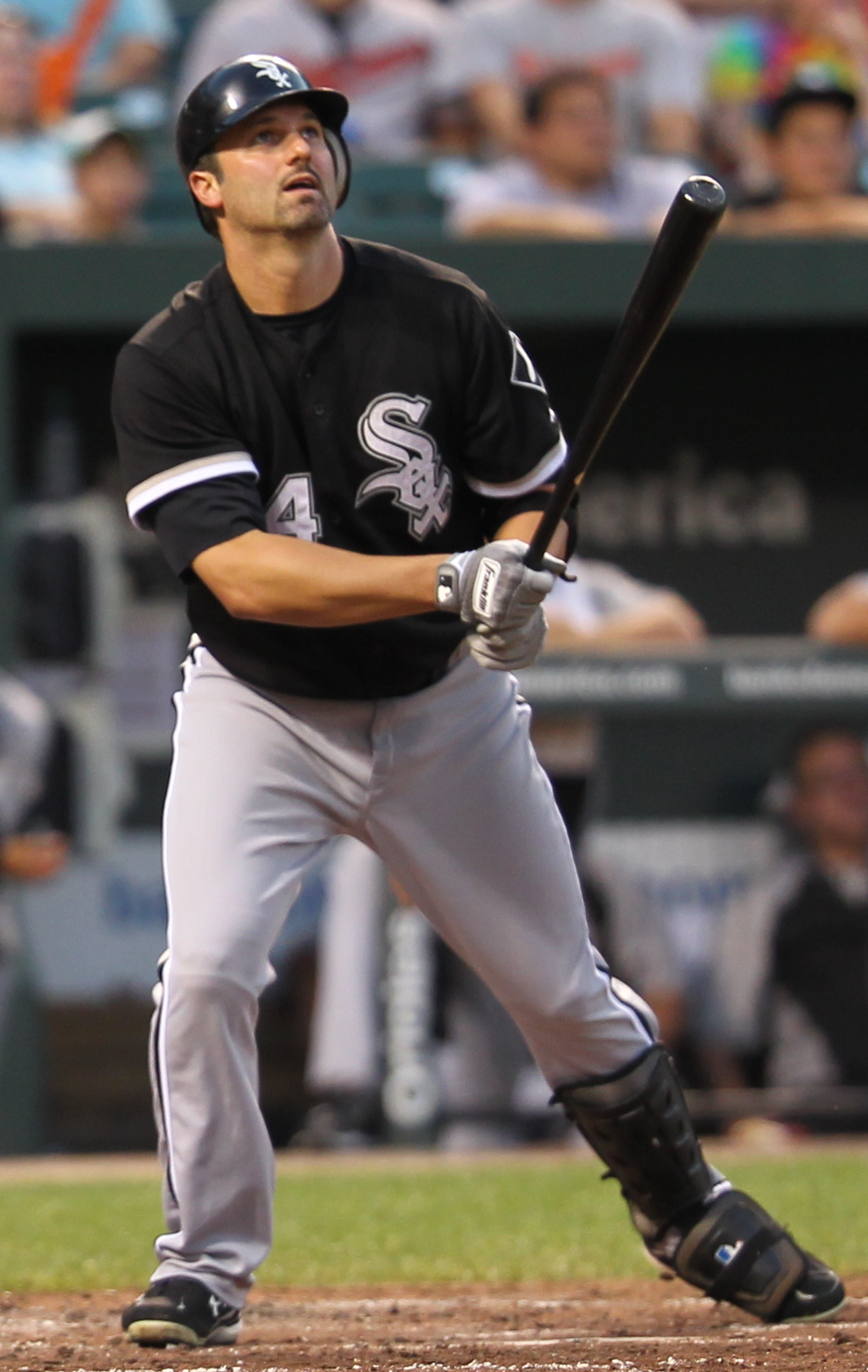
Paul Konerko

The Dodgers selected 77 players in this draft. Of those, 13 of them would eventually play Major League baseball.

The first round draft pick was Paul Konerko, a catcher from Chaparral High School in Scottsdale, Arizona. He was quickly converted to first base and made his Dodgers debut in 1997. He was traded the following year to the Cincinnati Reds and then in 1999 to the Chicago White Sox, where he became a six time All-Star and was the 2005 ALCS MVP as the White Sox won the 2005 World Series. In 18 seasons, he hit .279 with 439 home runs and 1,412 RBI in 2,349 games.

1994 draft picks

Round	Name	Position	School	Signed	Career span	Highest level
1	Paul Konerko	C	Chaparral High School	Yes	1994–2014	**MLB**
2	Gary Rath	LHP	Mississippi State University	Yes	1994–2008	**MLB**
3	Mike Metcalfe	SS	University of Miami	Yes	1994–2002	**MLB**
4	Ricky Stone	RHP	Hamilton High School	Yes	1994–2008	**MLB**
5	Chris Ochsenfeld	LHP	Bethel High School	Yes	1994–1998	A+
6	Eric DuBose	LHP	Patrician Academy	No; Athletics-1997	1997–2010	**MLB**
7	Robert Jaye	LHP	University of South Alabama	Yes	1994–1995	A+
8	Jason Huisman	SS	Thornwood High School	No; Angels-1998	1998–2002	AA
9	C. J. Ankrum	OF	Saratoga High School	No; Giants-1997	1997	A-
10	Ron Hollis	RHP	University of Michigan	Yes	1994–1997	AA
11	Alexis Fajardo	LHP	Coral Gables High School	No; Yankees-1996	1996	Rookie
12	Gregory Thompson	RHP	Goddard High School	Yes	1994	A-
13	Brian Harmon	OF	Marist High School	Yes	1994–1996	A
14	Eddie Oropesa	LHP		Yes	1993–2007	**MLB**
15	Alex Andreopoulos	C	Seton Hall University	No; Brewers -1995	1995–2002	AAA
16	Ken Kilian	OF	Wheaton Warrenville South High School	No		
17	Kevin Zellers	SS	Kent State University	Yes	1994–1995	A+
18	J. P. Roberge	1B	University of Southern California	Yes	1994–2004	AAA
19	Kyle Cooney	C	University of Connecticut	Yes	1994–1999	AA
20	Brett Tomko	RHP	Mt. San Antonio College	No; Reds-1995	1995–2014	**MLB**
21	Brock Rumfield	SS	Belton High School	No; Orioles-1998	1998–1999	A+
22	Adam Riggs	2B	University of South Carolina Aiken	Yes	1994–2008	**MLB**
23	Johnny Hilo	OF	California State University, Los Angeles	Yes	1994–1995	A+
24	Zachery Hines	SS	Georgia Perimeter College	No; Braves-1995	1995–1997	A
25	Randy Wolf	LHP	El Camino Real High School	No; Phillies-1997	1997–2015	**MLB**
26	Jason Reed	LHP	Grossmont College	Yes	1994–1996	A+
27	George Dearborn	LHP	Mountain View High School	No		
28	Ben Butkus	SS	Dr. Phillips High School	No; Orioles-1996	1996	Rookie
29	Jeff Paluk	RHP	Saginaw Valley State University	Yes	1994–1997	A+
30	Eric Stuckenschneider	OF	University of Central Missouri	Yes	1994–1999	AAA
31	Michael Wood	C	San Clemente High School	No		
32	Brian Majeski	OF	University of Connecticut	Yes	1994–1996	A+
33	Chip Sell	OF	University of the Pacific	Yes	1994–2001	AAA
34	Kevin Faircloth	SS	North Carolina State University	Yes	1994–1997	A+
35	Bobby Meyer	2B	Kirkwood Community College	Yes	1995–1996	A-
36	Ryan Sowards	3B	Walla Walla Community College	Yes	1994–1996	A+
37	Leonardo Matos	LHP	Luis Muñoz Marín High School	No		
38	Eric Byrnes	C	St. Francis High School	No; Athletics-1998	1998–2010	**MLB**
39	Kirby Drube	OF	Campbell County High School	No		
40	Aaron Miller	LHP	Middletown High School	No; Twins-1997	1997–1999	A
41	Jeff Bramlett	1B	Bradley Central High School	Yes	1995–1998	A+
42	Ryan Roskowski	3B	Clovis West High School	No		
43	Mark Shephard	RHP	Strathroy High School	No		
44	Jermaine Clark	SS	Will C. Wood High School	No; Mariners-1997	1997–2006	**MLB**
45	Brad Block	RHP	Portage Central High School	No		
46	Chuck Koone	OF	McDowell High School	No; Orioles-1998	1998–2001	A+
47	Keith Graddagnini	OF	De La Salle High School	No; Mariners-1998	1998–1999	Rookie
48	Marc Charbonneau	LHP	Kwantlen College	Yes	1995–2003	A
49	David Sloan	C	York Community High School	No		
50	Jim Parque	LHP	Crescenta Valley High School	No; White Sox-1997	1997–2007	**MLB**
51	Elias Tapia	RHP		Yes	1994–1996	A+
52	Clint Lawrence	LHP	White Oaks High School	No; Blue Jays-1995	1995–2001	AA
53	Justin Atchley	LHP	Texas A&M University	No; Reds-1995	1995–2002	**MLB**
54	Frank Hinojosa	C	Senator Ruben S. Ayala High School	No		
55	Thomas Cody	C	Lower Columbia College	No		
56	Adam Kiehl	OF	Wauwatosa East High School	No		
57	Tracy Johnson	OF	Glendale Community College	No		
58	Hector Esparza	3B	Independence High School	No		
59	Anthony Cellers	OF	Seminole Community College	No	1998	Ind
60	Jaime Decker	C	Fort Madison High School	No		
61	Luke Quaccia	1B	Modesto Junior College	No; Cardinals-1997	1997–1999	A+
62	Josh Osborn	RHP	Butte College	No		
63	Joel Manfredi	3B	Lincoln High School	Yes	1995–1997	A+
64	Brandon Bowe	RHP	San Joaquin Delta College	No; Marlins-1999	1999–2006	AA
65	Calvin Tanton	C	Strathmore High School	No	1998	Ind
66	Jesse Zepeda	SS	Cuesta College	No; Tigers-1996	1996–2000	A
67	Eric Boisjoly	SS	Polyvalente Edouard Montpetit	No		
68	Lance Backowski	2B	Fresno City College	Yes	1995–1997	A+
69	Jaime Malave	1B	Southeastern Illinois College	Yes	1995–2003	AAA
70	Cordell Farley	OF	Louisburg College	No; Cardinals-1996	1996–2000	AA
71	Greg Morrison	OF	Kwantlen College	Yes	1995–2006	A+
72	Shawn Painter	OF	John Abbott College	No		
73	Chris Vollaro	RHP	Oak Ridge High School	No		
74	Jeremiah Meccage	RHP	Billings West High School	No		
75	Otis Jasper	RHP	Quesnel High School	No		
76	Justin Elsey	OF	Casa Grande High School	No		
77	Ovidio Zepeda	OF	King High School	No		
