= 1994 Florida Marlins season =

1994 Florida Marlins
- League: National League
- Division: East
- Ballpark: Joe Robbie Stadium
- City: Miami Gardens, Florida
- Record: 51–64 (.443)
- Divisional place: 5th
- Owners: Wayne Huizenga
- General managers: Dave Dombrowski
- Managers: Rene Lachemann
- Television: Sunshine Network; WBFS-TV (Gary Carter, Jay Randolph)
- Radio: WQAM (Joe Angel, Dave O'Brien); WCMQ-FM (Spanish) (Felo Ramírez, Manolo Alvarez)

The 1994 Florida Marlins season was the second season for the Major League Baseball (MLB) franchise in the National League. It would begin with the team attempting to improve on their season from 1993. Their manager was Rene Lachemann. They played home games at Joe Robbie Stadium. They finished with a record of 51–64, last in the National League East. The season ended early as a result of the 1994 players strike.

== Offseason ==
- December 15, 1993: Mario Díaz was signed as a free agent with the Florida Marlins.
- December 20, 1993: Charlie Hough was signed as a free agent by the Marlins.
- December 20, 1993: Kerwin Moore was traded by the Marlins to the Oakland Athletics for Kurt Abbott.
- December 22, 1993: Mike Jeffcoat was signed as a free agent with the Florida Marlins.
- March 30, 1994: Mario Díaz was released by the Florida Marlins.

== Regular season ==
By Friday, August 12, the Marlins had compiled a 51-64 record through 115 games. They had scored 468 runs (4.07 per game) and allowed 576 runs (5.01 per game).

Charlie Hough was 46 when he took the hill on Opening Day for the Marlins. He was the second oldest pitcher to pitch on opening day. Jack Quinn started for the Brooklyn Dodgers on Opening Day in 1931 at the age of 47.

=== Season standings ===
NL East
Team	W	L	Pct.	GB	Home	Road
Montreal Expos	74	40	.649	—	32‍–‍20	42‍–‍20
Atlanta Braves	68	46	.596	6	31‍–‍24	37‍–‍22
New York Mets	55	58	.487	18½	23‍–‍30	32‍–‍28
Philadelphia Phillies	54	61	.470	20½	34‍–‍26	20‍–‍35
Florida Marlins	51	64	.443	23½	25‍–‍34	26‍–‍30

Division leaders
Team	W	L	Pct.
Montreal Expos	74	40	.649
Cincinnati Reds	66	48	.579
Los Angeles Dodgers	58	56	.509

Wild Card team	W	L	Pct.	GB
Atlanta Braves	68	46	0.597	—
Houston Astros	66	49	0.574	2 1/2
New York Mets	55	58	0.487	12 1/2
San Francisco Giants	55	60	0.478	13 1/2
Philadelphia Phillies	54	61	0.470	14 1/2
St. Louis Cardinals	53	61	0.465	15
Pittsburgh Pirates	53	61	0.465	15
Colorado Rockies	53	64	0.453	16 1/2
Florida Marlins	51	64	0.444	17 1/2
Chicago Cubs	49	64	0.434	18 1/2
San Diego Padres	47	70	0.402	22 1/2

=== Record vs. opponents ===
1994 National League record Source: MLB Standings Grid – 1994
Team	ATL	CHC	CIN	COL	FLA	HOU	LAD	MON	NYM	PHI	PIT	SD	SF	STL
Atlanta	—	4–2	5–5	8–2	8–4	3–3	6–0	4–5	5–4	6–3	3–9	6–1	5–1	5–7
Chicago	2–4	—	5–7	6–6	4–5	4–8	3–3	2–4	1–4	1–6	5–5	6–3	5–4	5–5
Cincinnati	5–5	7–5	—	4–4	7–5	4–6	3–6	4–2	2–4	4–2	9–3	8–2	7–2	2–2–1
Colorado	2–8	6–6	4–4	—	3–9	5–5	4–6	4–2	5–1	2–4	2–3	5–5	3–7	8–4
Florida	4–8	5–4	5–7	9–3	—	2–4	3–3	2–7	6–4	4–6	1–6	5–1	2–4	3–7
Houston	3–3	8–4	6–4	5–5	4–2	—	1–8	2–4	3–3	5–1	8–4	5–5	8–2	8–4
Los Angeles	0–6	3–3	6–3	6–4	3–3	8–1	—	3–9	6–6	7–5	3–3	6–4	5–5	2–4
Montreal	5–4	4–2	2–4	2–4	7–2	4–2	9–3	—	4–3	5–4	8–2	12–0	5–7	7–3
New York	4–5	4–1	4–2	1–5	4–6	3–3	6–6	3–4	—	4–6	4–5	6–6	6–6	6–3
Philadelphia	3-6	6–1	2–4	4–2	6–4	1–5	5–7	4–5	6–4	—	5–4	4–8	4–8	4–3
Pittsburgh	9–3	5–5	3–9	3–2	6–1	4–8	3–3	2–8	5–4	4–5	—	3–3	1–5	5–5
San Diego	1–6	3–6	2–8	5–5	1–5	5–5	4–6	0–12	6–6	8–4	3–3	—	5–2	4–2
San Francisco	1–5	4–5	2–7	7–3	4–2	2–8	5–5	7–5	6–6	8–4	5–1	2–5	—	2–4
St. Louis	7–5	5–5	2–2–1	4–8	7–3	4–8	4–2	3–7	3–6	3–4	5–5	2–4	4–2	—

=== 1994 Opening Day lineup ===
Player	Position
Chuck Carr	CF
Jerry Browne	3B
Gary Sheffield	RF
Orestes Destrade	1B
Jeff Conine	LF
Bret Barberie	2B
Benito Santiago	C
Kurt Abbott	SS
Charlie Hough	P

=== Notable transactions ===
- April 3, 1994: Matt Turner was traded by the Marlins to the Cleveland Indians for Jeremy Hernandez.
- May 30, 1994: Mario Díaz was signed as a free agent with the Florida Marlins.
- June 2, 1994: Josh Booty was drafted by the Marlins in the 1st round (5th pick) of the 1994 Major League Baseball draft. Player signed July 14, 1994.
- June 27, 1994: Mike Jeffcoat was released by the Florida Marlins.

=== Roster ===
1994 Florida Marlins
Roster
Pitchers: 27 Luis Aquino; 46 Ryan Bowen; 50 Brian Drahman; 44 Willie Fraser; 38 Mark Gardner; 11 Chris Hammond; 34 Bryan Harvey; 42 Jeremy Hernandez; 49 Charlie Hough; 37 Mike Jeffcoat; 40 John Johnstone; 24 Richie Lewis; 51 Terry Mathews; 53 Kurt Miller; 47 Jeff Mutis; 31 Robb Nen; 58 Yorkis Pérez; 48 Pat Rapp; 37 Rich Scheid; 35 David Weathers	Catchers: 23 Charles Johnson; 13 Bob Natal; 16 Greg O'Halloran; 09 Benito Santiago; 22,43 Ron Tingley; Infielders: 7 Kurt Abbott; 26 Alex Arias; 8 Bret Barberie; 14 Jerry Browne; 4 Greg Colbrunn; 39 Orestes Destrade; 29 Mario Díaz; 18 Dave Magadan; 43 Russ Morman; 6 Rick Renteria	Outfielders: 21 Chuck Carr; 25 Matias Carrillo; 19 Jeff Conine; 3 Carl Everett; 10 Gary Sheffield; 20 Jesús Tavárez; 17 Darrell Whitmore	Manager: 15 Rene Lachemann; Coaches: 53 Marcel Lachemann (Pitching); 57 Bob McClure (Bullpen); 28 Vada Pinson (1st Base); 12 Doug Rader (Hitting); 33 Frank Reberger (Bullpen); 1 Cookie Rojas (3rd Base)

== Player stats ==
=== Batting ===
==== Starters by position ====
Note: Pos = Position; G = Games played; AB = At bats; H = Hits; Avg. = Batting average; HR = Home runs; RBI = Runs batted in

Pos	Player	G	AB	H	Avg.	HR	RBI
C	Benito Santiago	101	337	92	.273	11	41
1B	Greg Colbrunn	47	155	47	.303	6	31
2B	Bret Barberie	107	372	112	.301	5	31
SS	Kurt Abbott	101	345	86	.249	9	33
3B	Jerry Browne	101	329	97	.295	3	30
LF	Jeff Conine	115	451	144	.319	18	82
CF	Chuck Carr	106	433	114	.263	2	30
RF	Gary Sheffield	87	322	89	.276	27	78

==== Other batters ====
Note: G = Games played; AB = At bats; H = Hits; Avg. = Batting average; HR = Home runs; RBI = Runs batted in

Player	G	AB	H	Avg.	HR	RBI
Dave Magadan	74	211	58	.275	1	17
Matías Carrillo	80	136	34	.250	0	9
Orestes Destrade	39	130	27	.208	5	15
Alex Arias	59	113	27	.239	0	15
Mario Díaz	32	77	25	.325	0	11
Ron Tingley	19	52	9	.173	1	2
Carl Everett	16	51	11	.216	2	6
Rick Rentería	28	49	11	.224	2	4
Jesús Tavárez	17	39	7	.179	0	4
Russ Morman	13	33	7	.212	1	2
Bob Natal	10	29	8	.276	0	2
Darrell Whitmore	9	22	5	.227	0	0
Charles Johnson	4	11	5	.455	1	4
Gerg O'Halloran	12	11	2	.182	0	1

=== Pitching ===
==== Starting pitchers ====
Note: G = Games pitched; IP = Innings pitched; W = Wins; L = Losses; ERA = Earned run average; SO = Strikeouts

Player	G	IP	W	L	ERA	SO
David Weathers	24	135.0	8	12	5.27	72
Pat Rapp	24	133.1	7	8	3.85	75
Charlie Hough	21	113.2	5	9	5.15	65
Chris Hammond	13	73.1	4	4	3.07	40
Ryan Bowen	8	47.0	1	5	4.94	32
Kurt Miller	4	20.0	1	3	8.10	11

==== Other pitchers ====
Note: G = Games pitched; IP = Innings pitched; W = Wins; L = Losses; ERA = Earned run average; SO = Strikeouts

Player	G	IP	W	L	ERA	SO
Mark Gardner	20	92.1	4	4	4.87	57
Rich Scheid	8	32.1	1	3	3.34	17

==== Relief pitchers ====
Note: G = Games pitched; W = Wins; L = Losses; SV = Saves; ERA = Earned run average; SO = Strikeouts

Player	G	W	L	SV	ERA	SO
Robb Nen	44	5	5	15	2.95	60
Richie Lewis	45	1	4	0	5.67	45
Yorkis Pérez	44	3	0	0	3.54	41
Jeff Mutis	35	1	0	0	5.40	30
Luis Aquino	29	2	1	0	3.73	22
Terry Mathews	24	2	1	0	3.35	21
Jeremy Hernandez	21	3	3	9	2.70	13
John Johnstone	17	1	2	0	5.91	23
Bryan Harvey	12	0	0	6	5.23	10
Brian Drahman	9	0	0	0	6.23	7
Willie Fraser	9	2	0	0	5.84	7
Mike Jeffcoat	4	0	0	0	10.13	1

== Farm system ==
Level	Team	League	Manager
AAA	Edmonton Trappers	Pacific Coast League	Sal Rende
AA	Portland Sea Dogs	Eastern League	Carlos Tosca
A	Brevard County Manatees	Florida State League	Fredi González
A	Kane County Cougars	Midwest League	Lynn Jones
A-Short Season	Elmira Pioneers	New York–Penn League	Jim Hendry
Rookie	GCL Marlins	Gulf Coast League	Juan Bustabad
