= 1994 San Francisco Giants season =

1994 San Francisco Giants
- League: National League
- Division: West
- Ballpark: Candlestick Park
- City: San Francisco
- Record: 55–60 (.478)
- Divisional place: 2nd
- Owners: Peter Magowan
- General managers: Bob Quinn
- Managers: Dusty Baker
- Television: KTVU; SportsChannel Pacific (Ted Robinson, Mike Krukow, Joe Morgan, Duane Kuiper)
- Radio: KNBR (Ted Robinson, Hank Greenwald, Mike Krukow, Duane Kuiper); SP Radio (Julio Gonzalez, Rene De La Rosa)

The 1994 San Francisco Giants season was the Giants' 112th season in Major League Baseball, their 37th season in San Francisco since their move from New York following the 1957 season, and their 35th at Candlestick Park. After winning 103 games in 1993, the Giants record dropped to 55–60 in a strike-shortened season. This was also the season in which Matt Williams hit a career high 43 home runs through 115 games by the time the strike hit, on pace to finish with 61; had the season continued, Williams may have had a chance to break Roger Maris's then-single season record of 61 home runs set in 1961.

== Offseason ==
- November 21, 1993: Mark Portugal signed as a free agent with the San Francisco Giants.
- December 20, 1993: Rex Hudler was signed as a free agent with the San Francisco Giants.
- March 22, 1994: Rex Hudler was released by the San Francisco Giants.

== Regular season ==
By Friday, August 12, the Giants had compiled a 55-60 record through 115 games. They had scored 504 runs (4.38 per game) and allowed 500 runs (4.35 per game).

The Giants were struggling offensively prior to the strike, at 28th in batting average (.249), doubles (159) and overall hits (963).

Their pitchers also struggled, combining to finish 28th in complete games, with just 2.

=== Notable transactions ===
- June 19, 1994: Darryl Strawberry signed as a free agent with the San Francisco Giants.
- June 29, 1994: Kent Bottenfield was signed as a free agent with the San Francisco Giants.
- September 14, 1994: Yorvit Torrealba was signed by the San Francisco Giants as an amateur free agent.

==== Draft picks ====
= Future All Star

The following were notable Giants draft picks from the MLB Amateur Draft held on June 2, 1994.

Round	Pick	Player	Nationality	Status
1	22	Dante Powell	United States	Player signed July 13, 1994.
5		Bobby Howry	United States	Player signed June 4, 1994.
9		Keith Foulke	United States	Player signed June 3, 1994.
20		J. D. Drew	United States	Did not sign.

=== Opening day starters ===
- Todd Benzinger
- Barry Bonds
- John Burkett
- Royce Clayton
- Darren Lewis
- Kirt Manwaring
- Willie McGee
- Robby Thompson
- Matt Williams

=== Season standings ===
NL West
Team	W	L	Pct.	GB	Home	Road
Los Angeles Dodgers	58	56	.509	—	33‍–‍22	25‍–‍34
San Francisco Giants	55	60	.478	3½	29‍–‍31	26‍–‍29
Colorado Rockies	53	64	.453	6½	25‍–‍32	28‍–‍32
San Diego Padres	47	70	.402	12½	26‍–‍31	21‍–‍39

Division leaders
Team	W	L	Pct.
Montreal Expos	74	40	.649
Cincinnati Reds	66	48	.579
Los Angeles Dodgers	58	56	.509

Wild Card team	W	L	Pct.	GB
Atlanta Braves	68	46	0.597	—
Houston Astros	66	49	0.574	2 1/2
New York Mets	55	58	0.487	12 1/2
San Francisco Giants	55	60	0.478	13 1/2
Philadelphia Phillies	54	61	0.470	14 1/2
St. Louis Cardinals	53	61	0.465	15
Pittsburgh Pirates	53	61	0.465	15
Colorado Rockies	53	64	0.453	16 1/2
Florida Marlins	51	64	0.444	17 1/2
Chicago Cubs	49	64	0.434	18 1/2
San Diego Padres	47	70	0.402	22 1/2

=== Record vs. opponents ===
1994 National League record Source: MLB Standings Grid – 1994
Team	ATL	CHC	CIN	COL	FLA	HOU	LAD	MON	NYM	PHI	PIT	SD	SF	STL
Atlanta	—	4–2	5–5	8–2	8–4	3–3	6–0	4–5	5–4	6–3	3–9	6–1	5–1	5–7
Chicago	2–4	—	5–7	6–6	4–5	4–8	3–3	2–4	1–4	1–6	5–5	6–3	5–4	5–5
Cincinnati	5–5	7–5	—	4–4	7–5	4–6	3–6	4–2	2–4	4–2	9–3	8–2	7–2	2–2–1
Colorado	2–8	6–6	4–4	—	3–9	5–5	4–6	4–2	5–1	2–4	2–3	5–5	3–7	8–4
Florida	4–8	5–4	5–7	9–3	—	2–4	3–3	2–7	6–4	4–6	1–6	5–1	2–4	3–7
Houston	3–3	8–4	6–4	5–5	4–2	—	1–8	2–4	3–3	5–1	8–4	5–5	8–2	8–4
Los Angeles	0–6	3–3	6–3	6–4	3–3	8–1	—	3–9	6–6	7–5	3–3	6–4	5–5	2–4
Montreal	5–4	4–2	2–4	2–4	7–2	4–2	9–3	—	4–3	5–4	8–2	12–0	5–7	7–3
New York	4–5	4–1	4–2	1–5	4–6	3–3	6–6	3–4	—	4–6	4–5	6–6	6–6	6–3
Philadelphia	3-6	6–1	2–4	4–2	6–4	1–5	5–7	4–5	6–4	—	5–4	4–8	4–8	4–3
Pittsburgh	9–3	5–5	3–9	3–2	6–1	4–8	3–3	2–8	5–4	4–5	—	3–3	1–5	5–5
San Diego	1–6	3–6	2–8	5–5	1–5	5–5	4–6	0–12	6–6	8–4	3–3	—	5–2	4–2
San Francisco	1–5	4–5	2–7	7–3	4–2	2–8	5–5	7–5	6–6	8–4	5–1	2–5	—	2–4
St. Louis	7–5	5–5	2–2–1	4–8	7–3	4–8	4–2	3–7	3–6	3–4	5–5	2–4	4–2	—

=== Roster ===
1994 San Francisco Giants
Roster
Pitchers: 47 Rod Beck; 40 Bud Black; 43 Kent Bottenfield; 49 Brad Brink; 34 Dave Burba; 33 John Burkett; 46 Steve Frey; 38 Pat Gomez; 41 Bryan Hickerson; 42 Mike Jackson; 36 Tony Menéndez; 55 Rich Monteleone; 19 Mark Portugal; 28 Kevin Rogers; 26 Bill Swift; 35 Salomón Torres; 50 William Van Landingham	Catchers: 8 Kirt Manwaring; 52 Jeff Reed; Infielders: 18 Mike Benjamin; 14 Todd Benzinger; 10 Royce Clayton; 31 Erik Johnson; 7 John Patterson; 13 J. R. Phillips; 23 Steve Scarsone; 6 Robby Thompson; 9 Matt Williams	Outfielders: 25 Barry Bonds; 45 Mark Carreon; 22 Rikkert Faneyte; 21 Mark Leonard; 2 Darren Lewis; 1 Dave Martinez; 51 Willie McGee; 17 Darryl Strawberry	Manager: 12 Dusty Baker; Coaches: 16 Bobby Bonds (Hitting); 15 Bob Brenly (Bullpen); 20 Wendell Kim (Third Base); 5 Bob Lillis (Bench); 48 Dick Pole (Pitching); 58 Dennis Sommers (First Base)

== Player stats ==
= Indicates team leader

= Indicates league leader

=== Batting ===
Note: Pos= Position; G = Games played; AB = At bats; H = Hits; HR = Home runs; RBI = Runs batted in; Avg. = Batting average

Pos	Player	G	AB	H	HR	RBI	Avg.
C	Kirt Manwaring	97	316	79	1	29	.250
1B	Todd Benzinger	107	328	87	9	31	.265
2B	John Patterson	85	240	57	3	32	.238
3B	Matt Williams	112	445	119	43	96	.267
SS	Royce Clayton	108	385	91	3	30	.236
LF	Barry Bonds	112	391	122	37	81	.312
CF	Darren Lewis	114	451	116	4	29	.257
RF	Willie McGee	45	156	44	5	23	.282

==== Other batters ====
Note: G = Games played; AB = At bats; H = Hits; Avg. = Batting average; HR = Home runs; RBI = Runs batted in

Player	G	AB	H	Avg.	HR	RBI
Dave Martinez	97	235	58	.247	4	27
Robby Thompson	35	129	27	.209	2	7
Jeff Reed	50	103	18	.175	1	7
Steve Scarsone	52	103	28	.272	2	13
Mark Carreon	51	100	27	.270	3	20
Darryl Strawberry	29	92	22	.239	4	17
Mike Benjamin	38	62	16	.258	1	9
J.R. Phillips	15	38	5	.132	1	3
Rikkert Faneyte	19	26	3	.115	0	4
Erik Johnson	5	13	2	.154	0	0
Mark Leonard	14	11	4	.364	0	2

=== Starting pitchers ===
Note: G = Games pitched; IP = Innings pitched; W = Wins; L = Losses; ERA = Earned run average; SO = Strikeouts

Player	G	IP	W	L	ERA	SO
John Burkett	25	159.1	6	8	3.62	85
Mark Portugal	21	137.1	10	8	3.93	87
Bill Swift	17	109.1	8	7	3.38	62
Salomón Torres	16	84.1	2	8	5.44	42
William Van Landingham	16	84.0	8	2	3.54	56
Bud Black	10	54.1	4	2	4.47	28

==== Other pitchers ====
Note: G = Games pitched; IP = Innings pitched; W = Wins; L = Losses; ERA = Earned run average; SO = Strikeouts

Player	G	IP	W	L	ERA	SO
Bryan Hickerson	28	98.1	4	8	5.40	59

===== Relief pitchers =====
Note: G = Games pitched; W = Wins; L = Losses; SV = Saves; ERA = Earned run average; SO = Strikeouts

Player	G	W	L	SV	ERA	SO
Rod Beck	48	2	4	28	2.77	39
Dave Burba	57	3	6	0	4.38	84
Steve Frey	44	1	0	0	4.94	20
Rich Monteleone	39	4	3	0	3.18	16
Mike Jackson	36	3	2	4	1.49	51
Pat Gomez	26	0	1	0	3.78	14
Kevin Rogers	9	0	0	0	3.48	7
Tony Menéndez	6	0	1	0	21.60	2
Brad Brink	4	0	0	0	1.08	3
Kent Bottenfield	1	0	0	0	10.80	0

== Awards and honors ==
- Mark Leiter P, Willie Mac Award

All-Star Game

== Farm system ==
Level	Team	League	Manager
AAA	Phoenix Firebirds	Pacific Coast League	Carlos Alfonso
AA	Shreveport Captains	Texas League	Ron Wotus
A	San Jose Giants	California League	Dick Dietz
A	Clinton LumberKings	Midwest League	Jack Mull
A-Short Season	Everett Giants	Northwest League	Mike Hart
Rookie	AZL Giants	Arizona League	Alan Bannister
