= Roberto Kelly =

Panamanian baseball player (born 1964)

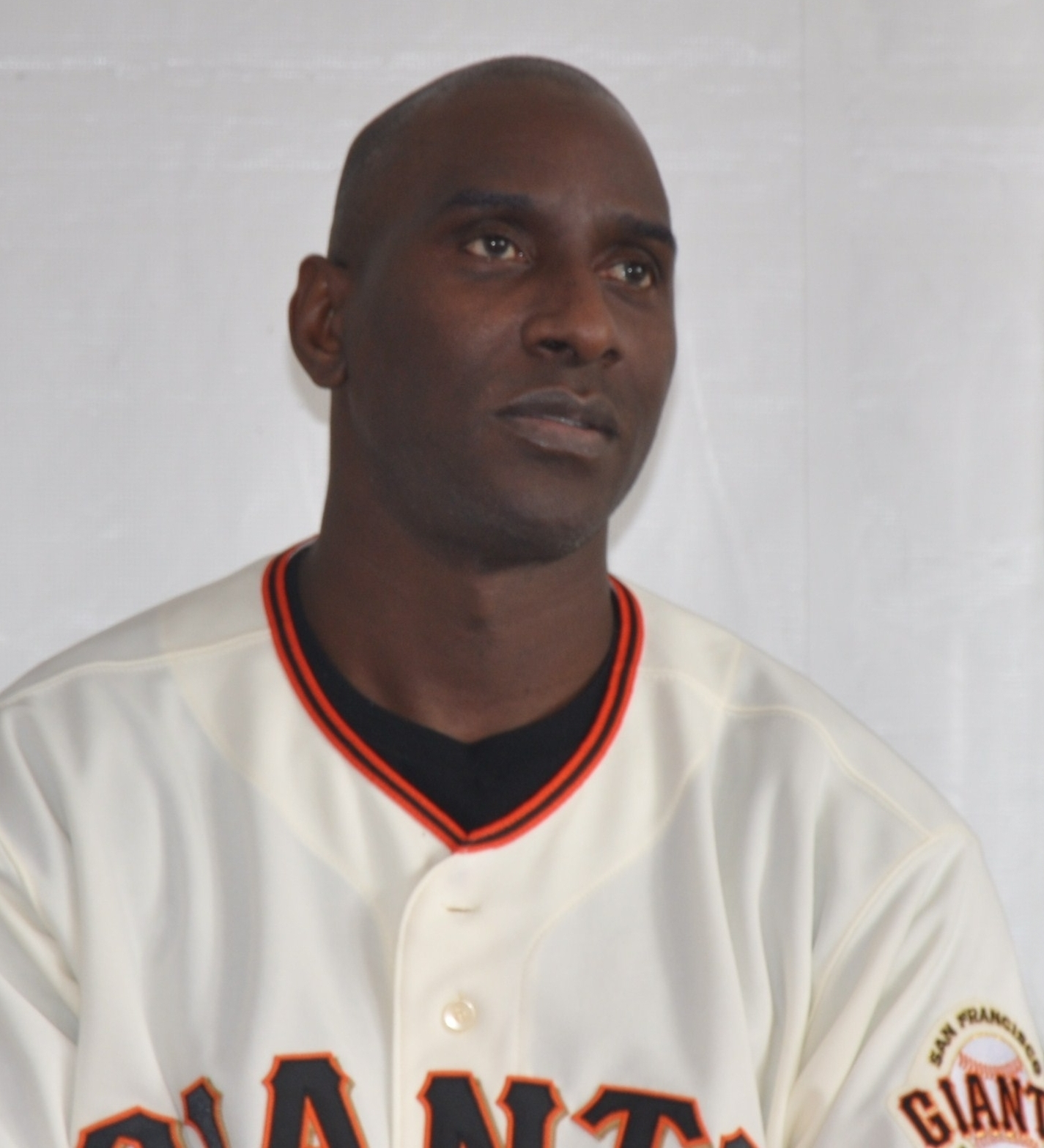
- Kelly with the San Francisco Giants

Toros de Tijuana – No. 39
- Outfielder / Manager
- Born: October 1, 1964 (age 62); Panama City, Panama
- Batted: Right Threw: Right

MLB debut
- July 29, 1987, for the New York Yankees

Last MLB appearance
- April 18, 2000, for the New York Yankees

MLB statistics
- Batting average: .290
- Home runs: 124
- Runs batted in: 585
- Stats at Baseball Reference

Teams
- As player: New York Yankees (1987–1992); Cincinnati Reds (1993–1994); Atlanta Braves (1994); Montreal Expos (1995); Los Angeles Dodgers (1995); Minnesota Twins (1996–1997); Seattle Mariners (1997); Texas Rangers (1998–1999); New York Yankees (2000); As coach: San Francisco Giants (2008–2016)

Career highlights and awards
- 2× All-Star (1992, 1993); 3× World Series Champion (2010, 2012, 2014)
Medals
Representing Panama
Men's baseball
Intercontinental Cup
Disqualified	2002 Havana	Team (Note: Bronze medal stripped due to doping.)

Roberto Conrado Kelly (born October 1, 1964) is a Panamanian professional baseball manager and former outfielder who currently serves as the manager for the Toros de Tijuana of the Mexican League. He was signed by the New York Yankees as an amateur free agent in 1982 and went on to play in Major League Baseball (MLB) for them (1987–1992 and 2000), the Cincinnati Reds (1993–1994), Atlanta Braves (1994), Montreal Expos (1995), Los Angeles Dodgers (1995), Minnesota Twins (1996–1997), Seattle Mariners (1997), and Texas Rangers (1998–1999). During his playing days in Panama, he was known as La Sombra, Spanish for Shadow. After his playing career, he managed the Giants' Single-A affiliate, the Augusta GreenJackets and later became a coach for the Giants' major league team.

== Professional career ==
=== New York Yankees (1987–1992) ===
Kelly made his MLB debut with the New York Yankees in 1987. He broke up Toronto Blue Jays pitcher Dave Stieb's perfect game at SkyDome in 1989 with a two-out double in the ninth inning. He was named to the 1992 American League All-Star team.

=== Cincinnati Reds (1993–1994) ===
After the 1992 season, the Yankees traded Kelly to the Cincinnati Reds for Paul O'Neill. With the Reds, Kelly made the 1993 National League All-Star team.

=== Atlanta Braves (1994) ===
On May 29, 1994, the Reds traded Kelly to the Atlanta Braves for Deion Sanders.

=== Montreal Expos (1995) ===
The Braves traded Kelly along with Tony Tarasco and Esteban Yan to the Montreal Expos for Marquis Grissom on April 6, 1995.

=== Los Angeles Dodgers (1995) ===
The following month, the Expos traded Kelly and Joey Eischen to the Los Angeles Dodgers for Henry Rodríguez and Jeff Treadway.

=== Minnesota Twins (1996–1997) ===
A free agent after the season, Kelly signed with the Minnesota Twins for the 1996 season.

In 14 seasons, he played in 1,337 games and had 4,797 at bats, 687 runs, 1,390 hits, 241 doubles, 30 triples, 124 home runs, 585 RBI, 235 stolen bases, 317 walks, a .290 batting average, a .337 on-base percentage and a .430 slugging percentage. Defensively, he recorded a .985 fielding percentage as an outfielder.

Kelly was a member of four playoff teams in his career, having helped the Dodgers win the 1995 NL West Division, the Mariners win the 1997 AL West, and the Rangers win the 1998 and 1999 AL Western Division. (Kelly played ten games for the 2000 American League East-winning New York Yankees, but played his final game on April 18, long before the playoffs.)

== Coaching career ==
On November 16, 2007, Kelly was hired as the San Francisco Giants' new first base coach and hitting instructor. As a manager of the Augusta GreenJackets, he gained a reputation for his aggressive approach to baserunning. In February 2008, he told Giants pitchers that he didn't want them to use the fact that they were pitchers as an excuse for poor baserunning.

On January 17, 2018, Kelly was announced as the new manager for the Sultanes de Monterrey of the Mexican League for the next three seasons.

On October 1, 2025, Kelly joined the Toros de Tijuana of the Mexican League as the team's manager.

== Personal life ==
Kelly is married to Blanca Gonzalez Kelly, sister of Juan González, and has seven sons, named Roberto Jr., Roberto Bryan, Xavier, Ryan, Johaun, Jacques and Jadrien. He also has three daughters named Charlene, Rhianna and Bianca.
