= Jarvis Brown =

American baseball player (born 1967)

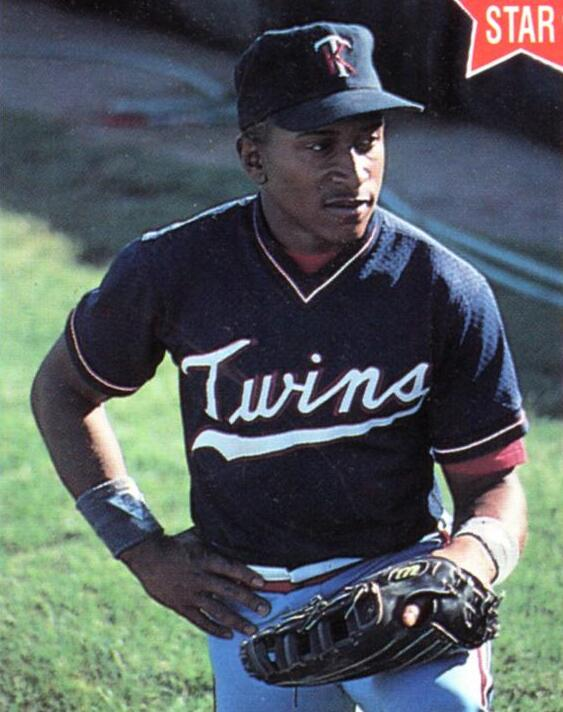
- Brown with the Kenosha Twins c. 1988
- Outfielder
- Born: March 26, 1967 (age 59); Waukegan, Illinois, U.S.
- Batted: Right Threw: Right

MLB debut
- July 1, 1991, for the Minnesota Twins

Last MLB appearance
- October 1, 1995, for the Baltimore Orioles

MLB statistics
- Batting average: .203
- Home runs: 1
- Runs batted in: 10
- Stats at Baseball Reference

Teams
- Minnesota Twins (1991–1992); San Diego Padres (1993); Atlanta Braves (1994); Baltimore Orioles (1995)

Career highlights and awards
- World Series champion (1991)

Jarvis Ardel Brown (born March 26, 1967) is an American Major League Baseball (MLB) outfielder who played for the Minnesota Twins, San Diego Padres, Atlanta Braves, and Baltimore Orioles. He won the World Series with the Twins.

== Career ==
Brown was born in Waukegan, Illinois, and attended St. Joseph High School in Kenosha, Wisconsin. After attending Triton Community College, he was drafted by the Twins in the first round (ninth overall) of the 1986 draft. He played in the major leagues from 1991 through 1995, seeing only limited playing time. He was a remarkably fast runner, but did not possess similar talents where hitting was concerned. He had only 227 at bats in the majors, with a career batting average of .203. He hit one home run in his career and drove in ten runs. He did, however, steal thirteen bases.

Brown has a World Series ring, when he was used almost exclusively as a pinch runner by the world champion 1991 Minnesota Twins. In the 1991 American League Championship Series, Brown had no at bats but played in one game and scored one run. During the 1991 World Series, he played in three games and was 0-for-2; he came on in the ninth inning of game seven as a pinch runner, advancing to the third base. Brown thus had the chance to become the first rookie in baseball history to score a World Series-winning run; however, he was stranded. The Twins won anyway, getting Brown a World Series ring.

== After baseball ==
After the completion of his Major League career, Jarvis Brown became head coach of the University of Wisconsin Parkside Rangers baseball program. After a three-year stint, Jarvis was relieved of his duties as head coach, in which he compiled a career record of 31-108.

As of 2009, Brown was an assistant baseball coach at Carthage College.
