= 1994 Major League Baseball season =

1994 MLB season
- League: Major League Baseball
- Sport: Baseball
- Duration: April 3 – August 11, 1994
- Games: 162 (scheduled); 112–117 (actual)
- Teams: 28
- TV partners: The Baseball Network (ABC and NBC); ESPN

Draft
- Top draft pick: Paul Wilson
- Picked by: New York Mets

Regular season
- Season MVP: NL: Jeff Bagwell (HOU); AL: Frank Thomas (CWS)

MLB seasons
- ← 1993 1995 →

Locations of teams for the 1994–1996 American League seasons
West Central East
Locations of teams for the 1994 National League season
West Central East

The 1994 Major League Baseball season began on April 3, but ended prematurely on August 11, 1994, with the 1994–95 Major League Baseball strike. The season started despite the expiration of MLB's previous collective bargaining agreement at the end of 1993. It was the first season played under the current three-division format in each league. It was also the first with an Opening Night game involving two National League teams, which did not become permanent until 1996.

== Strike ==
As a result of a players' strike, the MLB season ended prematurely on August 11, 1994. No postseason (including the World Series) was played. Over 260 players were scheduled to exceed $1 million in compensation in 1994. The Minor League Baseball season was played in its entirety. MLB Baseball would not attempt another salary cap until 2026.

== Awards and honors ==
- Baseball Hall of Fame
  - Steve Carlton
  - Leo Durocher
  - Phil Rizzuto

Baseball Writers' Association of America Awards
BBWAA Award	National League	American League
Rookie of the Year	Raúl Mondesí (LAD)	Bob Hamelin (KC)
Cy Young Award	Greg Maddux (ATL)	David Cone (KC)
Manager of the Year	Felipe Alou (MON)	Buck Showalter (NYY)
Most Valuable Player	Jeff Bagwell (HOU)	Frank Thomas (CWS)
Gold Glove Awards
Position	National League	American League
Pitcher	Greg Maddux (ATL)	Mark Langston (CAL)
Catcher	Tom Pagnozzi (STL)	Iván Rodríguez (TEX)
First Baseman	Jeff Bagwell (HOU)	Don Mattingly (NYY)
Second Baseman	Craig Biggio (HOU)	Roberto Alomar (TOR)
Third Baseman	Matt Williams (SF)	Wade Boggs (NYY)
Shortstop	Barry Larkin (CIN)	Omar Vizquel (CLE)
Outfielders	Barry Bonds (SF)	Kenny Lofton (CLE)
Outfielders	Darren Lewis (SF)	Devon White (TOR)
Outfielders	Marquis Grissom (MON)	Ken Griffey Jr. (SEA)
Silver Slugger Awards
Pitcher/Designated Hitter	Mark Portugal (SF)	Julio Franco (CWS)
Catcher	Mike Piazza (LAD)	Iván Rodríguez (TEX)
First Baseman	Jeff Bagwell (HOU)	Frank Thomas (CWS)
Second Baseman	Craig Biggio (HOU)	Carlos Baerga (CLE)
Third Baseman	Matt Williams (SF)	Wade Boggs (NYY)
Shortstop	Wil Cordero (MON)	Cal Ripken Jr. (BAL)
Outfielders	Barry Bonds (SF)	Albert Belle (CLE)
Outfielders	Moisés Alou (MON)	Kirby Puckett (MIN)
Outfielders	Tony Gwynn (SD)	Ken Griffey Jr. (SEA)

=== Other awards ===
- Roberto Clemente Award (Humanitarian): Dave Winfield (MIN)
- Rolaids Relief Man Award: Lee Smith (BAL, American); Rod Beck (SF, National)

=== Player of the Month ===
Month	American League	National League
April	Joe Carter	Ellis Burks
May	Frank Thomas	Lenny Dykstra; Mike Piazza
June	Albert Belle	Jeff Bagwell
July	Frank Thomas	Jeff Bagwell

=== Pitcher of the Month ===
Month	American League	National League
April	Ben McDonald	Bob Tewksbury
May	David Cone	Doug Drabek
June	Cal Eldred	Bobby Muñoz
July	Alex Fernandez	Bret Saberhagen

== Statistical leaders ==
Statistic	American League		National League	
AVG	Paul O'Neill NYY	.359	Tony Gwynn SD	.394
HR	Ken Griffey Jr. SEA	40	Matt Williams SF	43
RBI	Kirby Puckett MIN	112	Jeff Bagwell HOU	116
Wins	Jimmy Key NYY	17	Ken Hill MON; Greg Maddux ATL	16
ERA	Steve Ontiveros OAK	2.65	Greg Maddux ATL	1.56
SO	Randy Johnson SEA	204	Andy Benes SD	189
SV	Lee Smith BAL	33	John Franco NYM	30
SB	Kenny Lofton CLE	60	Craig Biggio HOU	39

== Standings ==
=== American League ===
AL East
Team	W	L	Pct.	GB	Home	Road
New York Yankees	70	43	.619	—	33‍–‍24	37‍–‍19
Baltimore Orioles	63	49	.562	6½	28‍–‍27	35‍–‍22
Toronto Blue Jays	55	60	.478	16	33‍–‍26	22‍–‍34
Boston Red Sox	54	61	.470	17	31‍–‍33	23‍–‍28
Detroit Tigers	53	62	.461	18	34‍–‍24	19‍–‍38

AL Central
Team	W	L	Pct.	GB	Home	Road
Chicago White Sox	67	46	.593	—	34‍–‍19	33‍–‍27
Cleveland Indians	66	47	.584	1	35‍–‍16	31‍–‍31
Kansas City Royals	64	51	.557	4	35‍–‍24	29‍–‍27
Minnesota Twins	53	60	.469	14	32‍–‍27	21‍–‍33
Milwaukee Brewers	53	62	.461	15	24‍–‍32	29‍–‍30

AL West
Team	W	L	Pct.	GB	Home	Road
Texas Rangers	52	62	.456	—	31‍–‍32	21‍–‍30
Oakland Athletics	51	63	.447	1	24‍–‍32	27‍–‍31
Seattle Mariners	49	63	.438	2	22‍–‍22	27‍–‍41
California Angels	47	68	.409	5½	23‍–‍40	24‍–‍28

=== National League ===
NL East
Team	W	L	Pct.	GB	Home	Road
Montreal Expos	74	40	.649	—	32‍–‍20	42‍–‍20
Atlanta Braves	68	46	.596	6	31‍–‍24	37‍–‍22
New York Mets	55	58	.487	18½	23‍–‍30	32‍–‍28
Philadelphia Phillies	54	61	.470	20½	34‍–‍26	20‍–‍35
Florida Marlins	51	64	.443	23½	25‍–‍34	26‍–‍30

NL Central
Team	W	L	Pct.	GB	Home	Road
Cincinnati Reds	66	48	.579	—	37‍–‍22	29‍–‍26
Houston Astros	66	49	.574	½	37‍–‍22	29‍–‍27
Pittsburgh Pirates	53	61	.465	13	32‍–‍29	21‍–‍32
St. Louis Cardinals	53	61	.465	13	23‍–‍33	30‍–‍28
Chicago Cubs	49	64	.434	16½	20‍–‍39	29‍–‍25

NL West
Team	W	L	Pct.	GB	Home	Road
Los Angeles Dodgers	58	56	.509	—	33‍–‍22	25‍–‍34
San Francisco Giants	55	60	.478	3½	29‍–‍31	26‍–‍29
Colorado Rockies	53	64	.453	6½	25‍–‍32	28‍–‍32
San Diego Padres	47	70	.402	12½	26‍–‍31	21‍–‍39

- On September 14, the remainder of the major league season was canceled by acting commissioner Bud Selig after 34 days of the players' strike.

== Home field attendance and payroll ==
Team name	Wins	%±	Home attendance	%±	Per game	Est. payroll	%±
Colorado Rockies	53	−20.9%	3,281,511	−26.8%	57,570	$23,887,333	130.7%
Toronto Blue Jays	55	−42.1%	2,907,933	−28.3%	49,287	$43,433,668	−8.1%
Atlanta Braves	68	−34.6%	2,539,240	−34.6%	46,168	$49,383,513	18.6%
Baltimore Orioles	63	−25.9%	2,535,359	−30.4%	46,097	$38,849,769	33.5%
Texas Rangers	52	−39.5%	2,503,198	11.5%	39,733	$32,973,597	−9.4%
Philadelphia Phillies	54	−44.3%	2,290,971	−27.0%	38,183	$31,599,000	10.7%
Los Angeles Dodgers	58	−28.4%	2,279,355	−28.1%	41,443	$38,000,001	−3.7%
Cleveland Indians	66	−13.2%	1,995,174	−8.4%	39,121	$30,490,500	64.3%
Florida Marlins	51	−20.3%	1,937,467	−36.8%	32,838	$21,633,000	11.9%
Cincinnati Reds	66	−9.6%	1,897,681	−22.6%	31,628	$41,073,833	−8.5%
St. Louis Cardinals	53	−39.1%	1,866,544	−34.4%	33,331	$29,275,601	25.3%
Chicago Cubs	49	−41.7%	1,845,208	−30.5%	31,275	$36,287,333	−7.9%
Boston Red Sox	54	−32.5%	1,775,818	−26.7%	27,747	$37,859,084	2.0%
San Francisco Giants	55	−46.6%	1,704,608	−34.6%	28,410	$42,638,666	21.3%
Chicago White Sox	67	−28.7%	1,697,398	−34.2%	32,026	$39,183,836	−1.3%
New York Yankees	70	−20.5%	1,675,556	−30.7%	29,396	$46,040,334	7.8%
Houston Astros	66	−22.4%	1,561,136	−25.1%	26,460	$33,126,000	9.7%
California Angels	47	−33.8%	1,512,622	−26.5%	24,010	$25,156,218	−12.0%
Kansas City Royals	64	−23.8%	1,400,494	−27.6%	23,737	$40,541,334	−2.2%
Minnesota Twins	53	−25.4%	1,398,565	−31.7%	23,704	$28,438,500	0.8%
Montreal Expos	74	−21.3%	1,276,250	−22.2%	24,543	$19,098,000	1.1%
Milwaukee Brewers	53	−23.2%	1,268,399	−24.9%	22,650	$24,350,500	2.3%
Oakland Athletics	51	−25.0%	1,242,692	−38.9%	22,191	$34,172,500	−9.6%
Pittsburgh Pirates	53	−29.3%	1,222,520	−25.9%	20,041	$24,217,250	−2.4%
Detroit Tigers	53	−37.6%	1,184,783	−39.9%	20,427	$41,446,501	8.6%
New York Mets	55	−6.8%	1,151,471	−38.5%	21,726	$30,956,583	−20.7%
Seattle Mariners	49	−40.2%	1,104,206	−46.2%	25,096	$29,228,500	−13.1%
San Diego Padres	47	−23.0%	953,857	−30.7%	16,734	$14,916,333	−41.5%

== Television coverage ==
This was the first season of The Baseball Network, the joint venture between MLB, ABC and NBC. Meanwhile, ESPN renewed its contract for Sunday Night Baseball and Wednesday Night Baseball.

Under The Baseball Network's original plan, the All-Star Game would alternate between NBC in even-numbered years and ABC in odd-numbered years. After the All-Star Game was complete, ABC took over coverage with what was to be their weekly slate of games under the Baseball Night in America banner. ABC was scheduled to televise six regular season games on Saturdays or Mondays in prime time. NBC would then pick up where ABC left off by televising six more regular season Friday night games. Every Baseball Night in America game was scheduled to begin at 8 p.m. Eastern Time (or 8 p.m. Pacific Time if the game occurred on the West Coast). A single starting time gave the networks the opportunity to broadcast one game and then, simultaneously, cut to another game when there was a break in action.

The networks had exclusive rights for the twelve regular season dates, in that no regional or national cable service (such as ESPN or superstations like Chicago's WGN-TV or Atlanta's WTBS) or over-the-air broadcaster was allowed to telecast a Major League Baseball game on those dates. Baseball Night in America (which premiered on July 16, 1994) usually aired up to fourteen games based on the viewers' region (affiliates chose games of local interest to carry) as opposed to a traditional coast-to-coast format. Normally, announcers who represented each of the teams playing in the respective games were paired with each other. More specifically, on regional Saturday night broadcasts and all non-"national" broadcasts, TBN let the two lead announcers from the opposing teams call the games involving their teams together.

Postseason coverage would have also alternated between the two networks. In even-numbered years, NBC would have the rights to the All-Star Game and both League Championship Series while ABC would have the World Series and newly created Division Series.

When the player's strike began on August 12, ABC had only aired games on four of its six scheduled dates, while NBC's slate was supposed to begin on August 26.

Network	Day of week	Announcers
ABC	Saturday nights Monday nights	Al Michaels, Jim Palmer, Tim McCarver See also: The Baseball Network announcers
NBC	Friday nights (Note: Due to the strike, NBC wasn't able to broadcast their slate of games for The Baseball Network, which was supposed to begin on August 26.)	Bob Costas, Joe Morgan, Bob Uecker
ESPN	Sunday nights Wednesday nights	Jon Miller, Joe Morgan See also: List of ESPN Major League Baseball broadcasters

== Events ==
- January 12 – Steve Carlton is elected to the Baseball Hall of Fame by the Baseball Writers' Association of America, receiving almost 96% of the vote. Orlando Cepeda falls seven votes short of the 75% required for election.
- February 7 – Basketball superstar Michael Jordan signs a minor league contract with the Chicago White Sox. He is invited to spring training with the team as a non-roster player.
- February 25 – The Veterans Committee elects Phil Rizzuto and Leo Durocher to the Baseball Hall of Fame.
- April 1–3 – BC Place in Vancouver, British Columbia, hosted an exhibition tournament with the Seattle Mariners, Colorado Rockies, Toronto Blue Jays, and the Montreal Expos participating.
- April 4 – At Wrigley Field, Chicago Cubs outfielder Tuffy Rhodes blasts three home runs on Opening Day, defeating New York Mets pitcher Dwight Gooden. Rhodes becomes the first player in major league history to hit home runs in his first three at-bats of the season. In spite of Rhodes' unexpected home run barrage, the Cubs lose the game, 12–8.
- April 8 – Kent Mercker of the Atlanta Braves pitches a 6–0 no-hitter against the Los Angeles Dodgers at Dodger Stadium, striking out 10 in the process. For Mercker, it is his first complete game in the Major Leagues.
- June 28 – The San Diego Padres set a modern (1900–present) major league record for most runs scored in the 11th inning, by scoring 9 runs against the Colorado Rockies
- July 12 – Moisés Alou's walk-off double in the 10th inning gives the National League an 8–7 victory over the American League in the All-Star Game. The NL is now a perfect 9–0 in extra-inning contests. John Hudek of the Houston Astros becomes the first pitcher in major league history to appear in an All-Star Game before recording a major league victory. Fred McGriff, whose two-run home run in the 9th inning tied the score, takes MVP honors.
- July 28 – Kenny Rogers of the Texas Rangers throws the fourteenth perfect game in Major League history.
- August 11 – The final games of the Major League season are played on this date. The next day, the players' strike begins. Minor League Baseball games are not affected.
- September 14 – The remainder of the Major League season (along with the postseason) is canceled by acting commissioner Bud Selig after 34 days of the players' strike. There would be no World Series for the first time since 1904.

== Movies ==
The following are baseball movies released in 1994:

- Major League II
- Little Big League
- Angels in the Outfield
- Baseball: A Film by Ken Burns (TV documentary)
- The Scout
- Cobb

== Deaths ==
- January 8 – Harvey Haddix, 68, All-Star pitcher best remembered for a 1959 game with the Pirates in which he threw 12 perfect innings before losing in the 13th; won 20 games for 1953 Cardinals and earned three Gold Gloves. Member of 1960 Pittsburgh Pirates, who won the World Series.
- January 9 – Johnny Temple, 66, All-Star second baseman, primarily for the Cincinnati Reds, who batted .300 three times
- January 10 – Chub Feeney, 72, National League president from 1970 to 1986; previously an executive and broadcaster with the Giants
- February 12 – Ray Dandridge, 80, Hall of Fame third baseman of the Negro leagues who often batted over .350
- March 16 – Eric Show, 37, pitcher who won 100 games for the San Diego Padres and surrendered Pete Rose's record 4,192nd hit
- May 9 – Ralph Brickner, 69, pitcher for the Boston Red Sox in the 1950s
- June 12 – Jim Brock, 57, coach at Arizona State since 1972 who led the Sun Devils to two College World Series titles (1977, 1981)
- June 23 – Marv Throneberry, 62, first baseman for the Yankees, Orioles, Mets, and Kansas City A's
- July 14 – César Tovar, 54, outfielder for the Minnesota Twins who in 1968 became the second major leaguer to play all nine positions in a game; had his team's only hit on five occasions
- September 5 – Hank Aguirre, 63, All-Star pitcher who led AL in ERA in 1962 with the Detroit Tigers
- December 26 – Allie Reynolds, 77, 6-time All-Star pitcher, mainly with the Yankees, who led AL in ERA in 1952 and in strikeouts and shutouts twice; in 1951 was first AL pitcher to throw two no-hitters in same year, and was MVP runner-up in 1952; career .630 winning percentage
