= 1994 Colorado Rockies season =

1994 Colorado Rockies
- League: National League
- Division: West
- Ballpark: Mile High Stadium
- City: Denver, Colorado
- Record: 53–64 (.453)
- Divisional place: 3rd
- Owner: Jerry McMorris
- General manager: Bob Gebhard
- Manager: Don Baylor
- Television: KWGN-TV (Dave Campbell, Charlie Jones)
- Radio: KOA (AM) (Wayne Hagin, Jeff Kingery); KCUV
- Stats: ESPN.com; Baseball Reference

The 1994 Colorado Rockies season was their second as a Major League Baseball team, and their final season at Mile High Stadium. Managed by Don Baylor, they finished with a record of 53–64, third in the National League West and six and a half games back from the division leader. The season was cut short by a player strike.

The Rockies had the highest home field attendance in the 1994 season, with over three million fans attending throughout the year. The team tied the White Sox for the most triples (39) in the majors that year. However, Rockies pitchers hit the most batters (49). In April 1994, the Rockies played in a weekend exhibition game at BC Place in Vancouver.

== Offseason ==
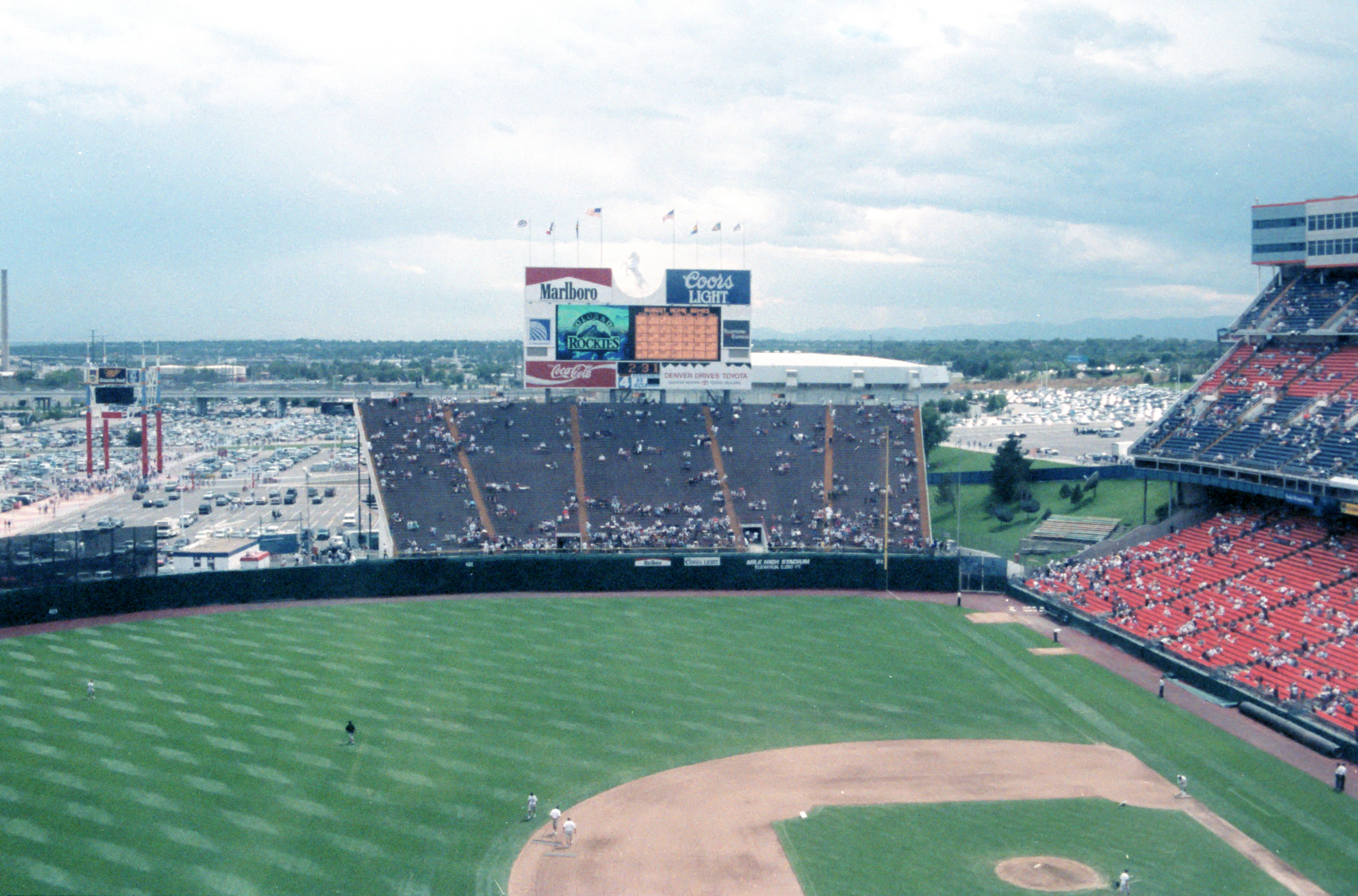
The Rockies hosting the Atlanta Braves at Mile High Stadium during an August home game in 1994.

- October 29, 1993: Marvin Freeman was signed as a free agent by the Colorado Rockies.
- November 19, 1993: Howard Johnson was signed as a free agent by the Colorado Rockies.
- November 30, 1993: Ellis Burks was signed as a free agent by the Colorado Rockies.
- January 7, 1994: Walt Weiss was signed as a free agent by the Colorado Rockies.
- March 31, 1994: John Vander Wal was purchased by the Colorado Rockies from the Montreal Expos.

== Regular season ==
By Friday, August 12, the Rockies had compiled a 53-64 record through 117 games. They were drawing really well at home, with an attendance of 3,281,511 through 57 home games for an average of 57,570 per game. At that pace, the team would have had a good chance of drawing more than 4.6 million fans in their 81 home games if the season had continued. Offensively, the Rockies had scored 573 runs (4.90 per game) and allowed 638 runs (5.45 per game) prior to the strike.

The Rockies tied the Chicago White Sox in 1994 for the most triples in the majors, with 39. Their pitchers, however, hit 49 batters: the most in the majors.

=== Opening Day starters ===
- Dante Bichette
- Ellis Burks
- Andrés Galarraga
- Joe Girardi
- Charlie Hayes
- Howard Johnson
- Roberto Mejía
- Armando Reynoso
- Walt Weiss

=== Transactions ===
- June 2, 1994: Doug Million was drafted by the Colorado Rockies in the 1st round of the 1994 amateur draft.
- June 3, 1994: Keith Shepherd was traded by the Colorado Rockies to the Boston Red Sox for Brian Conroy (minors).
- June 27, 1994: Kent Bottenfield was granted free agency by the Colorado Rockies.

=== Major League debuts ===
- Batters:
  - Trent Hubbard (Jul 7)
- Pitchers:
  - Mark Thompson (Jul 26)
  - Jim Czajkowski (Jul 29)

=== Roster ===
1994 Colorado Rockies
Roster
| Pitchers: 19 Willie Blair; 46 Kent Bottenfield; 38 Jim Czajkowski; 44 Marvin Freeman; 32 Mike Harkey; 46 Greg Harris; 40 Darren Holmes; 45 Curtis Leskanic; 54 Marcus Moore; 43 Mike Munoz; 17 David Nied; 28 Lance Painter; 39 Steve Reed; 42 Armando Reynoso; 30 Kevin Ritz; 18 Bruce Ruffin; 47 Mark Thompson; 53 Bruce Walton | Catchers: 7 Joe Girardi; 34 Jayhawk Owens; 16 Danny Sheaffer; Infielders: 9 Vinny Castilla; 14 Andrés Galarraga; 13 Charlie Hayes; 4 Nelson Liriano; 8 Roberto Mejía; 27 Ty Van Burkleo; 35 John Vander Wal; 22 Walt Weiss | Outfielders: 10 Dante Bichette; 26 Ellis Burks; 1 Trent Hubbard; 20 Howard Johnson; 33 Chris Jones; 12 Mike Kingery; 21 Eric Young | Manager: 25 Don Baylor; Coaches: 36 Larry Bearnarth (pitching); 24 Dwight Evans (hitting); 2 Gene Glynn (first base); 29 Ron Hassey (bench); 41 Bill Plummer (bullpen); 23 Don Zimmer (third base) |

=== Season standings ===
NL West
| Team | W | L | Pct. | GB | Home | Road |
|---|---|---|---|---|---|---|
| Los Angeles Dodgers | 58 | 56 | .509 | — | 33‍–‍22 | 25‍–‍34 |
| San Francisco Giants | 55 | 60 | .478 | 3½ | 29‍–‍31 | 26‍–‍29 |
| Colorado Rockies | 53 | 64 | .453 | 6½ | 25‍–‍32 | 28‍–‍32 |
| San Diego Padres | 47 | 70 | .402 | 12½ | 26‍–‍31 | 21‍–‍39 |

Division leaders
| Team | W | L | Pct. |
|---|---|---|---|
| Montreal Expos | 74 | 40 | .649 |
| Cincinnati Reds | 66 | 48 | .579 |
| Los Angeles Dodgers | 58 | 56 | .509 |

| Wild Card team | W | L | Pct. | GB |
|---|---|---|---|---|
| Atlanta Braves | 68 | 46 | 0.597 | — |
| Houston Astros | 66 | 49 | 0.574 | 2 1/2 |
| New York Mets | 55 | 58 | 0.487 | 12 1/2 |
| San Francisco Giants | 55 | 60 | 0.478 | 13 1/2 |
| Philadelphia Phillies | 54 | 61 | 0.470 | 14 1/2 |
| St. Louis Cardinals | 53 | 61 | 0.465 | 15 |
| Pittsburgh Pirates | 53 | 61 | 0.465 | 15 |
| Colorado Rockies | 53 | 64 | 0.453 | 16 1/2 |
| Florida Marlins | 51 | 64 | 0.444 | 17 1/2 |
| Chicago Cubs | 49 | 64 | 0.434 | 18 1/2 |
| San Diego Padres | 47 | 70 | 0.402 | 22 1/2 |

=== Record vs. opponents ===
1994 National League record Source: MLB Standings Grid – 1994
| Team | ATL | CHC | CIN | COL | FLA | HOU | LAD | MON | NYM | PHI | PIT | SD | SF | STL |
|---|---|---|---|---|---|---|---|---|---|---|---|---|---|---|
| Atlanta | — | 4–2 | 5–5 | 8–2 | 8–4 | 3–3 | 6–0 | 4–5 | 5–4 | 6–3 | 3–9 | 6–1 | 5–1 | 5–7 |
| Chicago | 2–4 | — | 5–7 | 6–6 | 4–5 | 4–8 | 3–3 | 2–4 | 1–4 | 1–6 | 5–5 | 6–3 | 5–4 | 5–5 |
| Cincinnati | 5–5 | 7–5 | — | 4–4 | 7–5 | 4–6 | 3–6 | 4–2 | 2–4 | 4–2 | 9–3 | 8–2 | 7–2 | 2–2–1 |
| Colorado | 2–8 | 6–6 | 4–4 | — | 3–9 | 5–5 | 4–6 | 4–2 | 5–1 | 2–4 | 2–3 | 5–5 | 3–7 | 8–4 |
| Florida | 4–8 | 5–4 | 5–7 | 9–3 | — | 2–4 | 3–3 | 2–7 | 6–4 | 4–6 | 1–6 | 5–1 | 2–4 | 3–7 |
| Houston | 3–3 | 8–4 | 6–4 | 5–5 | 4–2 | — | 1–8 | 2–4 | 3–3 | 5–1 | 8–4 | 5–5 | 8–2 | 8–4 |
| Los Angeles | 0–6 | 3–3 | 6–3 | 6–4 | 3–3 | 8–1 | — | 3–9 | 6–6 | 7–5 | 3–3 | 6–4 | 5–5 | 2–4 |
| Montreal | 5–4 | 4–2 | 2–4 | 2–4 | 7–2 | 4–2 | 9–3 | — | 4–3 | 5–4 | 8–2 | 12–0 | 5–7 | 7–3 |
| New York | 4–5 | 4–1 | 4–2 | 1–5 | 4–6 | 3–3 | 6–6 | 3–4 | — | 4–6 | 4–5 | 6–6 | 6–6 | 6–3 |
| Philadelphia | 3-6 | 6–1 | 2–4 | 4–2 | 6–4 | 1–5 | 5–7 | 4–5 | 6–4 | — | 5–4 | 4–8 | 4–8 | 4–3 |
| Pittsburgh | 9–3 | 5–5 | 3–9 | 3–2 | 6–1 | 4–8 | 3–3 | 2–8 | 5–4 | 4–5 | — | 3–3 | 1–5 | 5–5 |
| San Diego | 1–6 | 3–6 | 2–8 | 5–5 | 1–5 | 5–5 | 4–6 | 0–12 | 6–6 | 8–4 | 3–3 | — | 5–2 | 4–2 |
| San Francisco | 1–5 | 4–5 | 2–7 | 7–3 | 4–2 | 2–8 | 5–5 | 7–5 | 6–6 | 8–4 | 5–1 | 2–5 | — | 2–4 |
| St. Louis | 7–5 | 5–5 | 2–2–1 | 4–8 | 7–3 | 4–8 | 4–2 | 3–7 | 3–6 | 3–4 | 5–5 | 2–4 | 4–2 | — |

=== Game log ===
1994 Regular Season Game Log (53-64) (Home: 25-32; Road: 28-32)
April (10–12) (Home: 5-7; Road: 5-5)

| # | Date | Opponent | Score | Win | Loss | Save | Attendance | Record | Report |
|---|---|---|---|---|---|---|---|---|---|
| 1 | April 4 | Phillies | 12–6 | Slocumb (1–0) | Munoz (0–1) | | 72,470 | 0–1 | |
| 2 | April 6 | Phillies | 7–5 | Mason (1–0) | Holmes (0–1) | Jones (1) | 50,875 | 0–2 | |
| 3 | April 7 | Phillies | 13–8 | Slocumb (2–0) | Reed (0–1) | Muñoz (1) | 48,021 | 0–3 | |
| 4 | April 8 | @ Pirates | 7–3 | Nied (1–0) | Wagner (0–1) | | 44,136 | 1–3 | |
| 5 | April 9 | @ Pirates | 10–5 | Smith (1–1) | Reynoso (0–1) | | 17,458 | 1–4 | |
| 6 | April 11 | @ Phillies | 8–7 | Ruffin (1–0) | Mason (1–1) | Holmes (1) | 58,627 | 2–4 | |
| 7 | April 13 | @ Phillies | 12–3 | Rivera (1–0) | Harris (0–1) | | 23,346 | 2–5 | |
| 8 | April 14 | @ Phillies | 5–0 | Nied (2–0) | Schilling (0–2) | | 24,856 | 3–5 | |
| 9 | April 15 | Expos | 9–2 | Reynoso (1–1) | Fassero (0–1) | | 47,213 | 4–5 | Boxscore |
| 10 | April 16 | Expos | 7–3 | Reed (1–1) | Hill (2–1) | | 51,347 | 5–5 | Boxscore |
| 11 | April 17 | Expos | 6–5 (10) | Munoz (1–1) | Heredia (0–2) | | 55,443 | 6–5 | Boxscore |
| 12 | April 18 | Marlins | 5–3 | Aquino (1–0) | Holmes (0–2) | Harvey (4) | 46,283 | 6–6 | |
| 13 | April 19 | Marlins | 6–4 | Weathers (2–1) | Nied (2–1) | Harvey (5) | 50,217 | 6–7 | |
| 14 | April 20 | Marlins | 16–6 | Freeman (1–0) | Nen (0–1) | | 45,667 | 7–7 | |
| 15 | April 22 | Cubs | 9–2 | Banks (2–2) | Harkey (0–1) | | 54,195 | 7–8 | |
| 16 | April 23 | Cubs | 8–2 | Harris (1–1) | Morgan (0–3) | | 68,743 | 8–8 | |
| 17 | April 24 | Cubs | 12–4 | Trachsel (2–1) | Nied (2–2) | | 71,329 | 8–9 | |
| 18 | April 25 | @ Cardinals | 7–6 | Freeman (2–0) | Urbani (0–2) | Holmes (2) | 23,628 | 9–9 | |
| 19 | April 26 | @ Cardinals | 2–1 | Tewksbury (5–0) | Reynoso (1–2) | | 23,094 | 9–10 | |
| 20 | April 27 | @ Marlins | 3–2 | Hough (2–0) | Harkey (0–2) | Hernandez (2) | 24,114 | 9–11 | |
| 21 | April 28 | @ Marlins | 8–7 | Nen (1–1) | Blair (0–1) | Hernandez (3) | 32,236 | 9–12 | |
| 22 | April 29 | @ Cubs | 6–5 | Nied (3–2) | Trachsel (2–2) | Holmes (3) | 34,179 | 10–12 | |

May (13–14) (Home: 5-8; Road: 8-6)

| # | Date | Opponent | Score | Win | Loss | Save | Attendance | Record | Report |
|---|---|---|---|---|---|---|---|---|---|
| 23 | May 1 | @ Cubs | 6–2 | Freeman (3–0) | Young (0–2) | | 26,558 | 11–12 | |
| 24 | May 3 | Cardinals | 10–1 | Reynoso (2–2) | Palacios (0–1) | | 46,326 | 12–12 | |
| 25 | May 4 | Cardinals | 6–5 | Smith (1–0) | Holmes (0–3) | Murphy (2) | 51,639 | 12–13 | |
| 26 | May 6 | @ Padres | 8–0 | Benes (2–5) | Harkey (0–3) | | 15,574 | 12–14 | |
| 27 | May 7 | @ Padres | 2–1 | Hoffman (2–0) | Ruffin (1–1) | | 36,296 | 12–15 | |
| 28 | May 8 | @ Padres | 1–0 | Nied (4–2) | Harris (1–1) | Reed (1) | 14,328 | 13–15 | |
| 29 | May 9 | @ Giants | 12–5 | Hickerson (2–1) | Reynoso (2–3) | | 14,472 | 13–16 | |
| 30 | May 10 | @ Giants | 4–2 | Harris (2–1) | Burkett (3–3) | Ruffin (1) | 15,182 | 14–16 | |
| 31 | May 11 | @ Giants | 6–1 | Swift (5–3) | Harkey (0–4) | | 16,759 | 14–17 | |
| 32 | May 13 | @ Astros | 4–2 | Drabek (5–1) | Freeman (3–1) | | 29,962 | 14–18 | |
| 33 | May 14 | @ Astros | 4–2 | Nied (5–2) | Kile (3–2) | Ruffin (2) | 23,037 | 15–18 | |
| 34 | May 15 | @ Astros | 4–0 | Reynoso (3–3) | Swindell (3–1) | | 21,004 | 16–18 | |
| 35 | May 16 | Dodgers | 9–2 | Martínez (2–2) | Harris (2–2) | | 50,507 | 16–19 | |
| 36 | May 17 | Dodgers | 7–6 | Bottenfield (1–0) | Dreifort (0–3) | | 53,589 | 17–19 | |
| 37 | May 18 | Dodgers | 5–2 | Gross (3–1) | Blair (0–2) | Gott (1) | 54,108 | 17–20 | |
| 38 | May 19 | Dodgers | 8–2 | Hershiser (3–0) | Nied (5–3) | | 51,515 | 17–21 | |
| 39 | May 20 | Braves | 7–1 | Avery (5–1) | Reynoso (3–4) | | 71,368 | 17–22 | |
| 40 | May 21 | Braves | 5–4 | Mercker (3–0) | Harris (2–3) | McMichael (9) | 72,123 | 17–23 | |
| 41 | May 22 | Braves | 8–3 | Maddux (7–2) | Painter (0–1) | | 71,523 | 17–24 | |
| 42 | May 23 | Reds | 8–3 | Freeman (4–1) | Smiley (4–5) | Ruffin (3) | 45,713 | 18–24 | |
| 43 | May 24 | Reds | 11–7 | Bottenfield (2–0) | Hanson (3–4) | | 47,885 | 19–24 | |
| 44 | May 25 | Reds | 3–2 | Harkey (1–4) | Rijo (2–3) | Ruffin (4) | 47,264 | 20–24 | |
| 45 | May 26 | Reds | 14–4 | Roper (1–0) | Harris (2–4) | | 53,407 | 20–25 | |
| 46 | May 27 | @ Expos | 4–2 | White (1–0) | Painter (0–2) | Wetteland (6) | 22,882 | 20–26 | Boxscore |
| 47 | May 28 | @ Expos | 3–2 (10) | Ruffin (2–1) | Scott (1–2) | Bottenfield (1) | 30,452 | 21–26 | Boxscore |
| 48 | May 29 | @ Expos | 4–3 (10) | Scott (2–2) | Ruffin (2–2) | | 26,774 | 21–27 | Boxscore |
| 49 | May 30 | @ Mets | 12–2 | Ritz (1–0) | Gozzo (2–2) | Blair (1) | 20,705 | 22–27 | |
| 50 | May 31 | @ Mets | 3–2 | Harris (3–4) | Linton (4–2) | Ruffin (5) | 15,515 | 23–27 | |

June (13–16) (Home: 8-8; Road: 5-8)

| # | Date | Opponent | Score | Win | Loss | Save | Attendance | Record | Report |
|---|---|---|---|---|---|---|---|---|---|
| 51 | June 1 | @ Mets | 4–3 | Bottenfield (3–0) | Smith (3–6) | Ruffin (6) | 17,099 | 24–27 | |
| 52 | June 3 | Pirates | 6–4 | Freeman (5–1) | Neagle (5–6) | Ruffin (7) | 53,737 | 25–27 | |
| 53 | June 4 | Pirates | 4–3 | Smith (5–5) | Ritz (1–1) | Dewey (1) | 61,619 | 25–28 | |
| 54 | June 5 | Pirates | 4–3 | White (2–3) | Moore (0–1) | Ballard (2) | 63,653 | 25–29 | |
| 55 | June 6 | Mets | 11–3 | Linton (5–2) | Bottenfield (3–1) | | 51,679 | 25–30 | |
| 56 | June 7 | Mets | 10–8 | Ruffin (3–2) | Mason (2–3) | Munoz (1) | 51,018 | 26–30 | |
| 57 | June 8 | Mets | 5–4 | Moore (1–1) | Saberhagen (6–3) | Ruffin (8) | 52,117 | 27–30 | |
| 58 | June 9 | @ Reds | 7–1 | Rijo (5–3) | Ritz (1–2) | | 31,990 | 27–31 | |
| 59 | June 10 | @ Reds | 10–4 | Roper (2–0) | Harris (3–5) | | 33,610 | 27–32 | |
| 60 | June 11 | @ Reds | 6–4 | Fortugno (1–0) | Nied (5–4) | McElroy (3) | 36,887 | 27–33 | |
| 61 | June 12 | @ Reds | 3–2 | Reed (2–1) | Carrasco (3–3) | Ruffin (9) | 30,992 | 28–33 | |
| 62 | June 13 | @ Braves | 7–2 | Freeman (6–1) | Glavine (7–6) | | 48,528 | 29–33 | |
| 63 | June 14 | @ Braves | 3–1 | Mercker (5–1) | Ritz (1–3) | McMichael (15) | 44,545 | 29–34 | |
| 64 | June 15 | @ Braves | 4–0 | Smoltz (5–6) | Harris (3–6) | | 45,429 | 29–35 | |
| 65 | June 16 | @ Braves | 11–8 | Stanton (2–1) | Ruffin (3–3) | McMichael (16) | 45,827 | 29–36 | |
| 66 | June 17 | @ Dodgers | 13–5 | Painter (1–2) | Hershiser (3–4) | Blair (2) | 39,609 | 30–36 | |
| 67 | June 18 | @ Dodgers | 9–3 | Freeman (7–1) | Martínez (6–3) | | 50,482 | 31–36 | |
| 68 | June 19 | @ Dodgers | 7–3 | Astacio (5–5) | Ritz (1–4) | | 51,015 | 31–37 | |
| 69 | June 20 | Astros | 5–4 | Drabek (10–3) | Harris (3–7) | Hudek (11) | 50,671 | 31–38 | |
| 70 | June 21 | Astros | 8–0 | Nied (6–4) | Kile (5–3) | | 56,913 | 32–38 | |
| 71 | June 22 | Astros | 14–5 | Painter (2–2) | Swindell (5–5) | | 50,887 | 33–38 | |
| 72 | June 24 | Giants | 10–3 | Van Landingham (3–0) | Blair (0–3) | | 73,957 | 33–39 | |
| 73 | June 25 | Giants | 6–4 | Munoz (2–1) | Torres (2–7) | Ruffin (10) | 69,881 | 34–39 | |
| 74 | June 26 | Giants | 8–1 | Burkett (5–6) | Harris (3–8) | | 73,171 | 34–40 | |
| 75 | June 27 | Padres | 12–7 | Nied (7–4) | Ashby (3–6) | | 52,949 | 35–40 | |
| 76 | June 28 | Padres | 10–9 | Munoz (3–1) | Elliott (0–1) | Ruffin (11) | | 36–40 | |
| 77 | June 28 | Padres | 11–3 (11) | Hoffman (3–3) | Harris (3–9) | | 55,021 | 36–41 | |
| 78 | June 29 | Padres | 10–4 | Tabaka (2–1) | Blair (0–4) | Martínez (3) | 50,173 | 36–42 | |
| 79 | June 30 | @ Cardinals | 9–7 | Murphy (4–3) | Munoz (3–2) | Olivares (1) | 35,648 | 36–43 | |

July (14–14) (Home: 5-5; Road: 9-9)

| # | Date | Opponent | Score | Win | Loss | Save | Attendance | Record | Report |
|---|---|---|---|---|---|---|---|---|---|
| 80 | July 1 | @ Cardinals | 11–4 | Sutcliffe (5–3) | Harris (3–10) | Cimorelli (1) | 26,284 | 36–44 | |
| 81 | July 2 | @ Cardinals | 7–5 | Munoz (4–2) | Rodriguez (2–3) | Ruffin (12) | 39,785 | 37–44 | |
| 82 | July 3 | @ Cardinals | 5–2 | Reed (3–1) | Arocha (4–4) | Ruffin (13) | 35,093 | 38–44 | |
| 83 | July 4 | @ Cubs | 4–3 | Bautista (2–3) | Ruffin (3–4) | | | 38–45 | |
| 84 | July 4 | @ Cubs | 4–2 (15) | Walton (1–0) | Myers (1–4) | Harris (1) | 37,167 | 39–45 | |
| 85 | July 5 | @ Cubs | 9–6 | Ritz (2–4) | Crim (3–3) | Blair (3) | 30,142 | 40–45 | |
| 86 | July 6 | @ Cubs | 7–1 | Leskanic (1–0) | Trachsel (7–6) | Ruffin (14) | 32,637 | 41–45 | |
| 87 | July 7 | @ Marlins | 2–1 | Nied (8–4) | Johnstone (1–1) | | 28,783 | 42–45 | |
| 88 | July 8 | @ Marlins | 5–2 | Weathers (8–7) | Painter (2–3) | Nen (8) | 26,498 | 42–46 | |
| 89 | July 9 | @ Marlins | 4–2 | Rapp (5–5) | Freeman (7–2) | Nen (9) | 38,345 | 42–47 | |
| 90 | July 10 | @ Marlins | 6–4 | Aquino (2–1) | Harkey (1–5) | Nen (10) | 33,593 | 42–48 | |
All-Star Break: NL def. AL at Three Rivers Stadium, 8–7 (10)
| 91 | July 14 | Cardinals | 8–1 | Nied (9–4) | Pérez (2–3) | | 63,745 | 43–48 | |
| 92 | July 15 | Cardinals | 10–6 | Ritz (3–4) | Tewksbury (10–8) | | 63,179 | 44–48 | |
| 93 | July 16 | Cardinals | 15–4 | Painter (3–3) | Olivares (1–2) | | 70,217 | 45–48 | |
| 94 | July 17 | Cardinals | 10–6 | Freeman (8–2) | Sutcliffe (5–4) | | 61,972 | 46–48 | |
| 95 | July 18 | Cubs | 6–3 | Bullinger (4–2) | Harkey (1–6) | | 63,438 | 46–49 | |
| 96 | July 19 | Cubs | 6–1 | Trachsel (9–6) | Nied (9–5) | | 70,493 | 46–50 | |
| 97 | July 20 | Cubs | 9–8 | Veres (1–0) | Reed (3–2) | Plesac (1) | 60,173 | 46–51 | |
| 98 | July 22 | Marlins | 4–0 | Rapp (6–5) | Painter (3–4) | | 58,613 | 46–52 | |
| 99 | July 23 | Marlins | 5–4 | Freeman (9–2) | Scheid (0–2) | Ruffin (15) | 70,289 | 47–52 | |
| 100 | July 24 | Marlins | 6–4 | Nen (4–4) | Blair (0–5) | | 68,045 | 47–53 | |
| 101 | July 25 | @ Padres | 4–3 | Ritz (4–4) | Benes (6–12) | Ruffin (16) | 9,195 | 48–53 | |
| 102 | July 26 | @ Padres | 6–5 | Thompson (1–0) | Sanders (3–8) | Reed (2) | 11,896 | 49–53 | |
| 103 | July 27 | @ Padres | 9–2 | Hamilton (7–5) | Painter (3–5) | Mauser (2) | 9,666 | 49–54 | |
| 104 | July 28 | @ Giants | 5–1 | Freeman (10–2) | Monteleone (3–3) | | 31,130 | 50–54 | |
| 105 | July 29 | @ Giants | 8–4 | Black (4–1) | Nied (9–6) | | 25,192 | 50–55 | |
| 106 | July 30 | @ Giants | 6–4 | Portugal (10–7) | Ritz (4–5) | Beck (25) | 49,627 | 50–56 | |
| 107 | July 31 | @ Giants | 9–4 | Van Landingham (7–1) | Thompson (1–1) | Hickerson (1) | 50,007 | 50–57 | |

August (3–7) (Home: 2-4; Road: 1-3)

| # | Date | Opponent | Score | Win | Loss | Save | Attendance | Record | Report |
|---|---|---|---|---|---|---|---|---|---|
| 108 | August 1 | @ Astros | 8–3 | Painter (4–5) | Harnisch (7–5) | | 22,256 | 51–57 | |
| 109 | August 2 | @ Astros | 3–1 | Drabek (11–6) | Harris (3–11) | | 22,574 | 51–58 | |
| 110 | August 3 | @ Astros | 2–1 | Jones (5–2) | Ruffin (3–5) | | 18,320 | 51–59 | |
| 111 | August 4 | @ Astros | 6–2 | Kile (8–6) | Ritz (4–6) | | 30,053 | 51–60 | |
| 112 | August 5 | Dodgers | 5–4 | Martínez (11–7) | Leskanic (1–1) | Worrell (10) | 70,283 | 51–61 | |
| 113 | August 7 | Dodgers | 6–2 | Hershiser (6–6) | Harris (3–12) | | 70,372 | 51–62 | |
| 114 | August 8 | Dodgers | 7–6 | Ruffin (4–5) | Worrell (6–5) | | 52,634 | 52–62 | |
| 115 | August 9 | Braves | 7–4 | McMichael (4–6) | Nied (9–7) | | 61,595 | 52–63 | |
| 116 | August 10 | Braves | 1–0 (6) | Ritz (5–6) | Glavine (13–9) | Reed (3) | 65,157 | 53–63 | |
| 117 | August 11 | Braves | 13–0 | Maddux (16–6) | Painter (4–6) | | 65,043 | 53–64 | |

Legend
| Rockies win | Rockies loss | All-Star Game | Game postponed |

== Player stats ==
| = Indicates team leader |

=== Batting ===
==== Starters by position ====
Note: Pos = Position; G = Games played; AB = At bats; H = Hits; Avg. = Batting average; HR = Home runs; RBI = Runs batted in

| Pos | Player | G | AB | H | Avg. | HR | RBI |
|---|---|---|---|---|---|---|---|
| C | Joe Girardi | 93 | 330 | 91 | .276 | 4 | 34 |
| 1B | Andrés Galarraga | 103 | 417 | 133 | .319 | 31 | 85 |
| 2B | Nelson Liriano | 87 | 255 | 65 | .255 | 3 | 31 |
| SS | Walt Weiss | 110 | 423 | 106 | .251 | 1 | 32 |
| 3B | Charlie Hayes | 113 | 423 | 122 | .288 | 10 | 50 |
| LF | Eric Young | 90 | 228 | 62 | .272 | 7 | 30 |
| CF | Mike Kingery | 105 | 301 | 105 | .349 | 4 | 41 |
| RF | Dante Bichette | 116 | 484 | 147 | .304 | 27 | 95 |

==== Other batters ====
Note: G = Games played; AB = At bats; H = Hits; Avg. = Batting average; HR = Home runs; RBI = Runs batted in

| Player | G | AB | H | Avg. | HR | RBI |
|---|---|---|---|---|---|---|
| Howard Johnson | 93 | 227 | 48 | .211 | 10 | 40 |
| Ellis Burks | 42 | 149 | 48 | .322 | 13 | 24 |
| Vinny Castilla | 52 | 130 | 43 | .331 | 3 | 18 |
| Roberto Mejía | 38 | 116 | 28 | .241 | 4 | 14 |
| Danny Sheaffer | 44 | 110 | 24 | .218 | 1 | 12 |
| John Vander Wal | 91 | 110 | 27 | .245 | 5 | 15 |
| Chris Jones | 21 | 40 | 12 | .300 | 0 | 2 |
| Trent Hubbard | 18 | 25 | 7 | .280 | 1 | 3 |
| Jayhawk Owens | 6 | 12 | 3 | .250 | 0 | 1 |
| Ty Van Burkleo | 2 | 5 | 0 | .000 | 0 | 0 |

=== Pitching ===
==== Starting pitchers ====
Note: G = Games pitched; IP = Innings pitched; W = Wins; L = Losses; ERA = Earned run average; SO = Strikeouts

| Player | G | IP | W | L | ERA | SO |
|---|---|---|---|---|---|---|
| Greg Harris | 29 | 130.0 | 3 | 12 | 6.65 | 82 |
| David Nied | 22 | 122.0 | 9 | 7 | 4.80 | 74 |
| Marvin Freeman | 19 | 112.2 | 10 | 2 | 2.80 | 67 |
| Lance Painter | 15 | 73.2 | 4 | 6 | 6.11 | 41 |
| Kevin Ritz | 15 | 73.2 | 5 | 6 | 5.62 | 53 |
| Armando Reynoso | 9 | 52.1 | 3 | 4 | 4.82 | 25 |
| Mark Thompson | 2 | 9.0 | 1 | 1 | 9.00 | 5 |

==== Other pitchers ====
Note: G = Games pitched; IP = Innings pitched; W = Wins; L = Losses; ERA = Earned run average; SO = Strikeouts

| Player | G | IP | W | L | ERA | SO |
|---|---|---|---|---|---|---|
| Mike Harkey | 24 | 91.2 | 1 | 6 | 5.79 | 39 |
| Curtis Leskanic | 8 | 22.1 | 1 | 1 | 5.64 | 17 |

==== Relief pitchers ====
Note: G = Games pitched; W = Wins; L = Losses; SV = Saves; ERA = Earned run average; SO = Strikeouts

| Player | G | W | L | SV | ERA | SO |
|---|---|---|---|---|---|---|
| Bruce Ruffin | 56 | 4 | 5 | 16 | 4.04 | 65 |
| Steve Reed | 61 | 3 | 2 | 3 | 3.94 | 51 |
| Mike Munoz | 57 | 4 | 2 | 1 | 3.74 | 32 |
| Willie Blair | 47 | 0 | 5 | 3 | 5.79 | 68 |
| Marcus Moore | 29 | 1 | 1 | 0 | 6.15 | 33 |
| Darren Holmes | 29 | 0 | 3 | 3 | 6.35 | 33 |
| Kent Bottenfield | 15 | 3 | 1 | 1 | 5.84 | 15 |
| Jim Czajkowski | 5 | 0 | 0 | 0 | 4.15 | 2 |
| Bruce Walton | 4 | 1 | 0 | 0 | 8.44 | 1 |

== Farm system ==
| Level | Team | League | Manager |
|---|---|---|---|
| AAA | Colorado Springs Sky Sox | Pacific Coast League | Brad Mills |
| AA | New Haven Ravens | Eastern League | Paul Zuvella |
| A | Central Valley Rockies | California League | Bill Hayes |
| A | Asheville Tourists | South Atlantic League | Tony Torchia |
| A-Short Season | Bend Rockies | Northwest League | Rudy Jaramillo |
| Rookie | AZL Rockies | Arizona League | P. J. Carey |

Records
| Preceded by 1993 | Colorado Rockies seasons 1994 | Succeeded by 1995 |
