= Jerad Head =

American baseball player (born 1982)

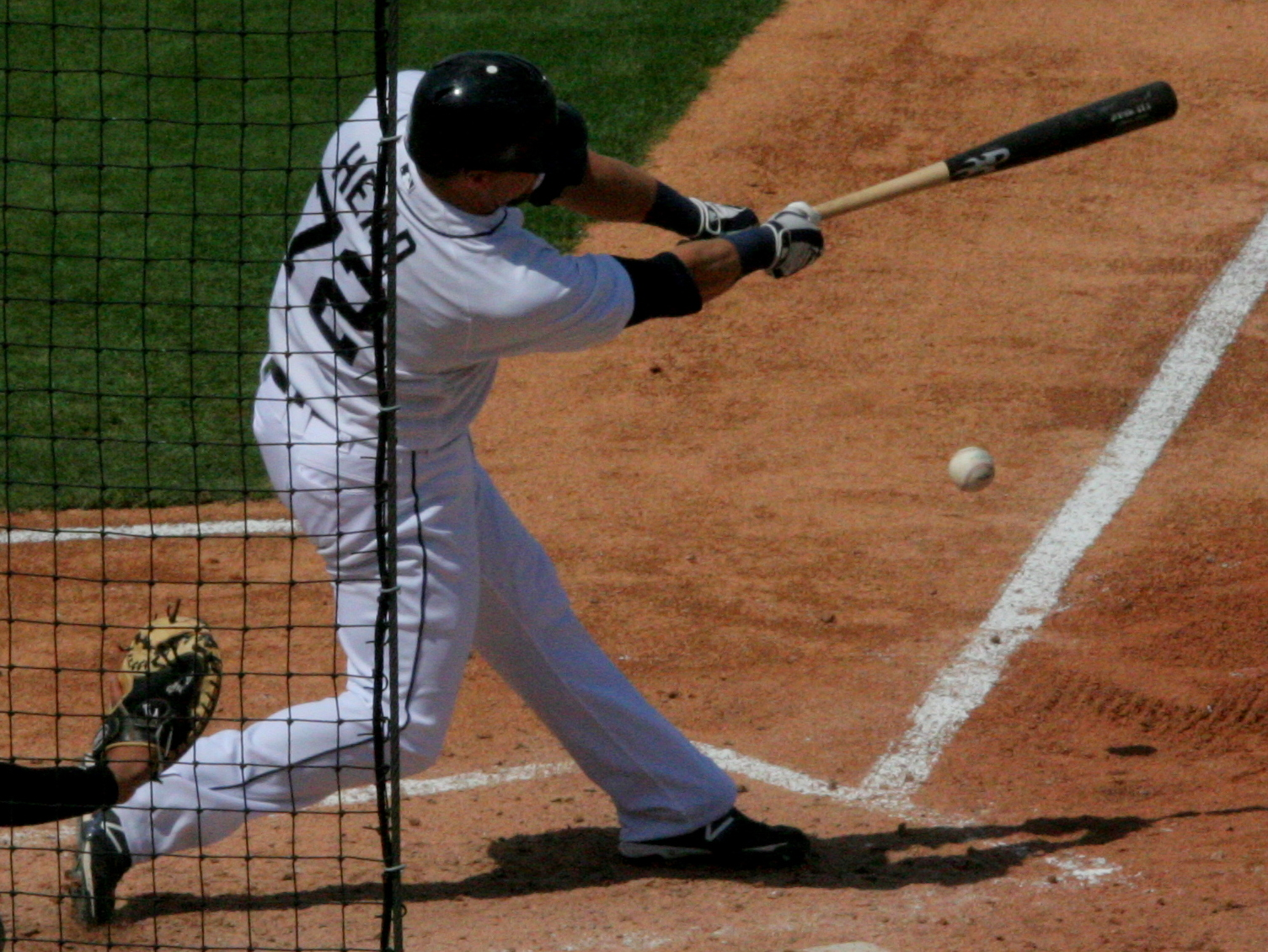
- Head in 2012 spring training
- Outfielder
- Born: November 15, 1982 (age 43); Topeka, Kansas
- Batted: Right Threw: Right

MLB debut
- August 28, 2011, for the Cleveland Indians

Last MLB appearance
- September 26, 2011, for the Cleveland Indians

MLB statistics
- Batting average: .125
- Home runs: 0
- Runs batted in: 1
- Stats at Baseball Reference

Teams
- Cleveland Indians (2011)

Jerad Lee Head (born November 15, 1982) is a retired Major League Baseball player and former minor league baseball manager. During his playing career Head served primarily as an outfielder, appearing for the Cleveland Indians for ten games in 2011 as a left fielder and pinch hitter. He managed the Class A Short Season Auburn Doubledays of the New York–Penn League between 2016 and 2018.

== Career ==
Head attended Hayden High School and Washburn University before being signed as a non-drafted free agent by the Cleveland Indians. Starting in 2006, Head played in minor league baseball, appearing with the Burlington Indians, Lake County Captains, Kinston Indians, Akron Aeros, Buffalo Bisons, and Columbus Clippers between 2006 and 2011.

Head was promoted to the majors on August 28, 2011 as a replacement in the outfield for Michael Brantley, who was out the rest of the season. After batting only 2 for 23 in eight games, Head was designated for assignment on September 7, 2011 to make room on the 40-man roster for Trevor Crowe. Head was placed back on the Indians' roster on September 25, 2011. Head was subsequently outrighted to Triple-A Columbus again on October 18. He declared free agency on November 2.

The Detroit Tigers signed Head to a minor league contract on November 29, 2011. He signed a minor league deal with the Washington Nationals before the 2013 season, and spent one season with them before being released.

=== Post-playing career ===
Head was named as the Manager of the Auburn Doubledays of the Class A Short Season New York-Penn League for the 2016 season, and managed them to a 99-129 record between 2016 and 2018. Before the 2019 season, he was replaced by Rocket Wheeler.
