= Auburn Doubledays =

Collegiate minor league baseball team in Auburn, New York

Logo	Cap insignia

Information
- League: PGCBL (2021–present) (Central Division)
- Location: Auburn, New York
- Ballpark: Falcon Park II (1995–present)
- Founded: 1958
- Nickname: Auburn Doubledays (1996–present)
- League championships: (NYPL): 1962, 1964, 1966, 1967, 1970, 1973, 1998, 2007 (PGCBL): None
- Division championships: (NYPL): 1964, 1966, 1967, 1968, 1970, 1973, 1985, 1994, 2002, 2003, 2004, 2005, 2006, 2007, 2011 (PGCBL): None
- Former name: Auburn Astros (1982–1995); Auburn Americans (1980); Auburn Red Stars (1979); Auburn Sunsets (1978); Auburn Phillies (1972–1977); Auburn Twins (1967–1971); Auburn Mets (1962–1966); Auburn Yankees (1958–1961)
- Former league: NYPL (1958–2020)
- Former ballpark: Falcon Park I (1958–1994)
- Colors: Blue, red, white
- Mascot: Abner
- Ownership: Auburn Community Baseball, LLC
- General manager: Adam Winslow
- Manager: Ben Julian (2021–present)
- Website: auburndoubledays.com

The Auburn Doubledays are a collegiate summer baseball team of the Perfect Game Collegiate Baseball League (PGCBL) that is located in Auburn, New York. From 1958 to 2020, they were members of Minor League Baseball's New York–Penn League (NYPL). They have played their home games at Leo Pinckney Field at Falcon Park since 1995. They previously played at the original Falcon Park, which was built in 1927 on the same site. The team is owned and operated by Auburn Community Baseball.

Auburn began in the NYPL in 1958 and has since competed under various names and served as the farm team for a number of Major League Baseball teams. The Doubledays and its mascot, Abner, are named for Abner Doubleday, the Civil War general and Auburn native apocryphally credited with inventing the game of baseball. Abner wears number 96 in honor of the birth of the team in 1996. With Major League Baseball's reorganization of the minor leagues after the 2020 season, Auburn was not selected to continue in affiliated baseball; they signed a deal to become members of the Perfect Game Collegiate Baseball League (PGCBL) starting in 2021.

== History ==
=== Early championship era ===
In 1958, the Auburn New York–Penn League franchise was founded as the Auburn Yankees, as an affiliate of the New York Yankees. The Yankees affiliation lasted until 1961. The club included future Major League Baseball All-Stars Jim Bouton, Joe Pepitone, and Mel Stottlemyre. The team then became affiliated with the New York Mets, as the Auburn Mets. With a roster that included Billy Wynne, Don Shaw, Tug McGraw, and Jerry Koosman, the club won the league championship three times: in 1962, 1964, and 1966.

In 1967, the club changed its affiliation to the Minnesota Twins and became the Auburn Twins. The Twins won NYPL title in 1967 and 1970.

In 1972, the team was renamed the Auburn Phillies after associating with the Philadelphia Phillies. In 1973, under manager Harry Lloyd, the team won league championship. Future major leaguers Luis Aguayo, Randy Lerch, Dickie Noles, Lonnie Smith, and Ozzie Virgil, among numerous others, played for the team. Managers of note included Mike Compton and Ruben Amaro.

=== Co-op seasons ===
In 1978, the team became the Auburn Sunsets and were co-operated by the Phillies and Houston Astros. Managed by Dick Rockwell, the team went achieved a 32–40 record, finishing third in the league's Yawkey Division. The team featured future major league players Carmelo Castillo and Alejandro Sanchez and future major league general manager Dave Littlefield.

In 1979 the club became known as the Auburn Red Stars. The team featured future MLB player Doug Frobel. The Red Stars operated under a co-operative agreement. The Red Stars received players from seven different major league organizations, led by the Detroit Tigers, with seven players, and Cleveland Indians, with five.

In 1980, the Red Stars changed their name to the Auburn Americans. The team once again operated as a co-op and received 17 players from the Cleveland Indians and several from the Los Angeles Dodgers. The squad featured future MLB player Jack Fimple and finished fourth in the New York–Penn League's West Division with a 29–45 record.

=== Astros era ===
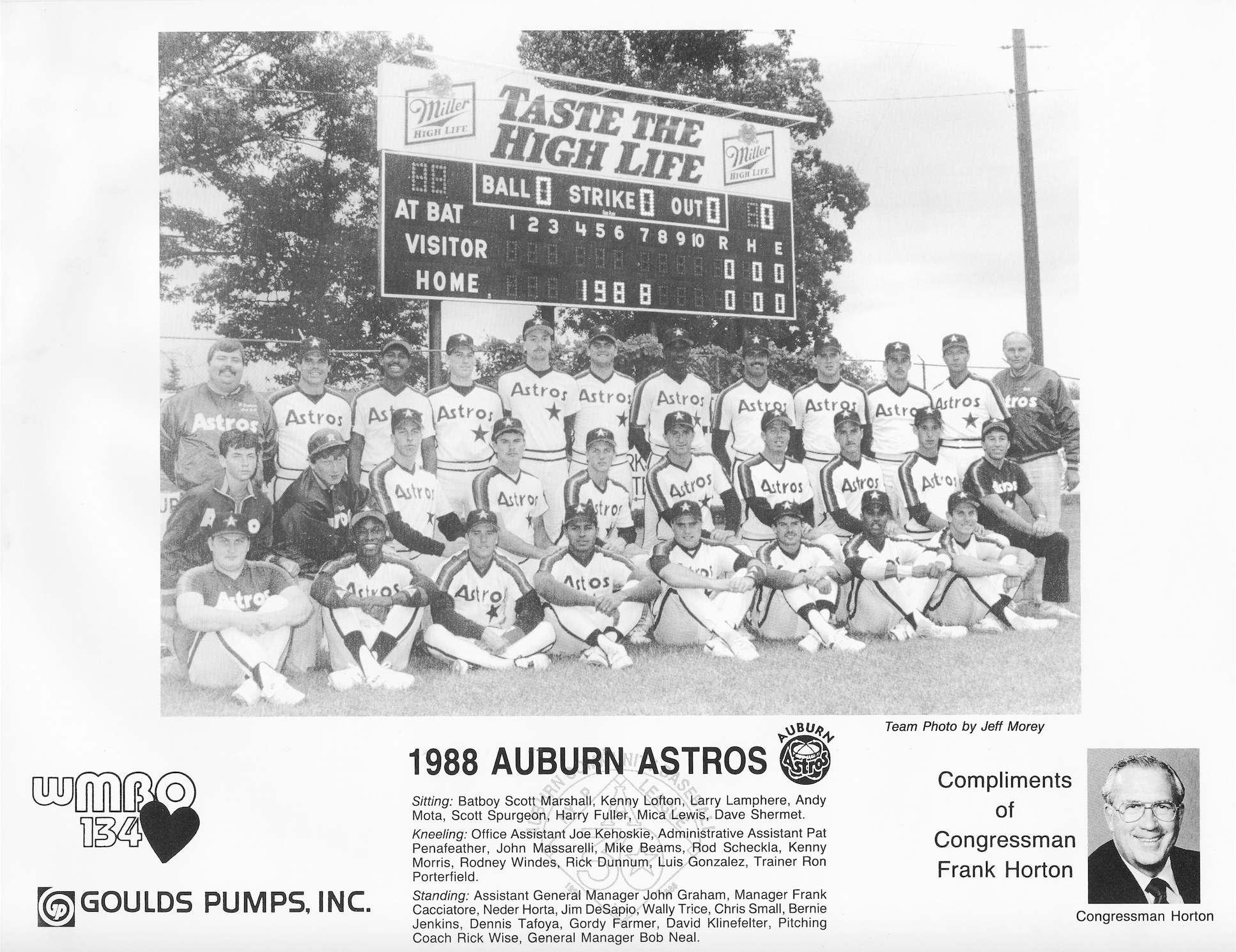
1988 Auburn Astros team photo

Auburn returned to play in the New York–Penn League in 1982 with the Auburn Astros as an affiliate of the Houston Astros.

In 1991, with John H. Graham as general manager, the team set the all-time attendance record at Falcon Park.

=== Doubledays ===
The team was renamed the Auburn Doubledays before the 1996 season and has operated under that name since.

In 1998, the Doubledays and the Oneonta Yankees were named co-champions of the New York–Penn League after Central New York was hit with a torrential rain storm and the fields at both parks were deemed unplayable.

Under the management of Dennis Holmberg, the Doubledays won the Pinckney Division title for six straight years in 2002, 2003, 2004, 2005, 2006, and 2007, but failed to win the league championship for the first five of those years. After losing in the first round of the playoffs for the first three years of their streak, they advanced to the New York–Penn League championship series before being swept by the Staten Island Yankees. In 2003, the Doubledays led all of baseball in winning percentage (.757).

The Doubledays finally won the NYPL title in 2007, sweeping the Brooklyn Cyclones in the league championship series. The final game featured a stellar pitching performance by Brett Cecil and a home run by J. P. Arencibia. This was the first league championship for the city of Auburn since 1973.

After the cancelled 2020 minor league season, Major League Baseball took direct control of Minor League Baseball and discontinued short-season play. The Doubledays were not among the four teams invited to remain as full-season affiliates of the Washington Nationals, with whom they had been affiliated since 2011. The city and the team's ownership group are exploring options such as independent baseball or collegiate summer baseball for 2021.

== Season-by-season results ==
Year	League	Record	Finish	Manager	Playoffs	Misc
1958	NYPL	67–58	4th	Tom Gott	Lost in 1st round	Debut season and first season as members of NYPL
1959	NYPL	58–67	5th	Bob Bauer	Did not qualify	–
1960	NYPL	65–63	3rd	Bob Bauer	Lost in 1st round	–
1961	NYPL	52–73	8th	Loren Babe	Did not qualify	–
1962	NYPL	62–57	3rd (tie)	Dick Cole	League champions	–
1963	NYPL	76–54	1st	Dick Cole	Lost in 1st round	–
1964	NYPL	79–48	1st	Clyde McCullough	League champions	–
1965	NYPL	73–55	2nd	Clyde McCullough	Did not qualify	–
1966	NYPL	80–49	1st	Clyde McCullough	League champions	–
1967	NYPL	52–26	1st	Tom Umphlett	League champions	–
1968	NYPL	49–27	1st	Boyd Coffie	Lost league finals	–
1969	NYPL	31–42	7th	Steve Thornton	Did not qualify	–
1970	NYPL	43–26	1st	Boyd Coffie	League champions	–
1971	NYPL	42–28	2nd	Boyd Coffie	Did not qualify	–
1972	NYPL	39–30	4th	Nolan Campbell	Did not qualify	–
1973	NYPL	46–23	1st	Harry Lloyd	League champions	–
1974	NYPL	34–32	2nd	Larry Rojas	Did not qualify	–
1975	NYPL	31–37	4th	June Raines	Did not qualify	–
1976	NYPL	24–45	5th	Mike Compton	Did not qualify	–
1977	NYPL	17–53	10th	Ruben Amaro	Did not qualify	–
1978	NYPL	32–40	6th	Dick Rockwell	Did not qualify	–
1979	NYPL	22–45	10th	Tom Kotchman	Did not qualify	–
1980	NYPL	29–45	7th	Bill Julio	Did not qualify	–
1981	NYPL	—	—	—	—	No Season Played
1982	NYPL	35–39	8th	Bob Hartsfield	Did not qualify	–
1983	NYPL	43–31	4th	Bob Hartsfield	Did not qualify	–
1984	NYPL	38–38	7th	Bob Hartsfield	Did not qualify	–
1985	NYPL	47–31	2nd	Bob Hartsfield	Lost league finals	–
1986	NYPL	44–32	3rd	Keith Bodie	Lost in 1st round	–
1987	NYPL	39–36	7th	Gary Tuck	Did not qualify	–
1988	NYPL	42–33	5th	Frank Cacciatore	Did not qualify	–
1989	NYPL	35–42	7th	Reggie Waller	Did not qualify	–
1990	NYPL	31–46	11th	Ricky Peters	Did not qualify	–
1991	NYPL	38–39	6th	Steve Dillard	Did not qualify	–
1992	NYPL	32–41	12th	Steve Dillard	Did not qualify	–
1993	NYPL	30–46	14th	Manny Acta	Did not qualify	–
1994	NYPL	45–31	2nd	Manny Acta	Lost league finals	–
1995	NYPL	40–34	5th	Manny Acta	Did not qualify	–
1996	NYPL	37–39	8th	Manny Acta	Did not qualify	–
1997	NYPL	29–47	13th	Mike Rojas	Did not qualify	–
1998	NYPL	43–32	3rd	Lyle Yates	League Co-Champions	–
1999	NYPL	39–37	8th	Lyle Yates	Did not qualify	–
2000	NYPL	32–42	11th	John Massarelli	Did not qualify	–
2001	NYPL	32–42	11th	Paul Elliott	Did not qualify	–
2002	NYPL	47–29	4th	Dennis Holmberg	Lost in 1st round	–
2003	NYPL	56–18	1st	Dennis Holmberg	Lost in 1st round	–
2004	NYPL	50–24	1st	Dennis Holmberg	Lost in 1st round	–
2005	NYPL	45–30	3rd	Dennis Holmberg	Lost league finals	–
2006	NYPL	42–32	3rd	Dennis Holmberg	Lost in 1st round	–
2007	NYPL	47–29	3rd	Dennis Holmberg	League champions	–
2008	NYPL	38–37	7th (tie)	Dennis Holmberg	Did not qualify	–
2009	NYPL	26–49	14th	Dennis Holmberg	Did not qualify	–
2010	NYPL	35–40	9th	Dennis Holmberg	Did not qualify	–
2011	NYPL	45–30	3rd	Gary Cathcart	Lost league finals	–
2012	NYPL	46–30	3rd	Gary Cathcart	Lost in 1st round	–
2013	NYPL	26–49	14th	Gary Cathcart	Did not qualify	–
2014	NYPL	34–41	9th	Gary Cathcart	Did not qualify	–
2015	NYPL	36–38	9th	Gary Cathcart	Did not qualify	–
2016	NYPL	28–47	12th	Jerad Head	Did not qualify	–
2017	NYPL	36–45	12th (tie)	Jerad Head	Did not qualify	–
2018	NYPL	41–35	2nd	Jerad Head	Lost in 1st round	–
2019	NYPL	30–46	6th	Rocket Wheeler	Did not qualify	–
2020	NYPL	—	—	—	—	Season canceled due to COVID-19
2021	PGCBL	27–20	2nd	Ben Julian	Lost in semi-finals	First season as members of PGCBL

== Playoffs ==
- 1968 season: Defeated Williamsport, 1–0, in semifinals; lost to Oneonta, 1–0, in championship.
- 1978 season: Lost to Geneva, 2–0, in championship.
- 1985 season: Defeated Jamestown, 1–0, in semifinals; lost to Oneonta, 2–0, in championship.
- 1986 season: Lost to St. Catharines, 1–0, in semifinals.
- 1994 season: Defeated Watertown, 2–0, in semifinals; lost to New Jersey, 2–0, in championship.
- 1998 season: Defeated Batavia, 2–0, in semifinals; declared co–champions with Oneonta (series rained out).
- 2002 season: Lost to Oneonta, 2–0, in semifinals.
- 2003 season: Lost to Williamsport, 2–0, in semifinals.
- 2004 season: Lost to Mahoning Valley, 2–0, in semifinals.
- 2005 season: Defeated Oneonta, 2–0, in semifinals; lost to Staten Island, 2–0, in championship.
- 2006 season: Lost to Tri-City, 2–1, in semifinals.
- 2007 season: Defeated Oneonta, 2–1, in semifinals; defeated Brooklyn, 2–0, to win championship.
- 2011 season: Defeated Vermont, 2–1, in semifinals; lost to Staten Island, 2–0, in championship.
- 2012 season: Lost to Tri-City, 2–1, in semifinals.
- 2018 season: Lost to Hudson Valley Renegades 2–0, in semifinals.
- 2021 season: Defeated Utica 7–0, in quarterfinals; lost to Amsterdam 7–1, in semifinals.

== Roster ==
Auburn Doubledays roster
Active roster	Coaching staff
Pitchers: 20 Carson Ashby; 35 Chris Auclair; 28 Carson Gerhardy; 17 Robert Gruber; 9 Adam Hoechstetter; 16 Sam Hough; 27 Dan Johnson; 37 Bobby Lavely; 25 Brandon Matthews; 15 Ryan O’Connell; 1 Eddie Rives; 22 Cameron Sheets; 34 Mitsuki Shimonishi; 18 Mitch Stone; 36 Alec Teska; Utility players: 12 Tyler Attal; 24 Erik Charnetski; Catchers: 19 Austin Davison; 3 Carson Dunkel; 14 John Nowak; Infielders: 23 Noah Campanelli; 2 Pierce Hendershot; 4 Genki LeClair; 39 Matt Livingston; 6 Marcus Maristela; 8 Logan Matson; 33 Brian Norsen; 30 Griffin O'Ferrall; 11 Conor Smith; Outfielders: 13 Kelvin Cortez; 7 Dymitri Kanellakis; 32 Evan McDonald; 26 Garrett Prosper	Manager: -- Ben Julian; Coaches: -- Noah Ackerman (statistician); -- Evan McAndrew (pitching); -- John Rizzo (assistant); -- Braden York (broadcast); Disabled list; ‡ Inactive list; § Suspended list; updated July 30, 2021

== Alumni ==
=== Notable Auburn Astros players ===
- Troy Afenir, 1983
- Mark Bailey, 1982
- Jeff Ball, 1990
- Ramón Castro, 1995
- Gary Cooper, 1986
- Jeff Datz, 1982, 1984
- Cameron Drew, 1985
- John Fishel, 1985
- Tom Funk, 1983
- Luis Gonzalez, 1988
- Jason Green, 1995
- Mike Grzanich, 1993
- John Halama, 1994
- Dean Hartgraves, 1987
- Chris Hatcher, 1990
- Randy Hennis, 1987
- Chris Holt, 1992
- Trent Hubbard, 1986
- Blaise Ilsley, 1985
- Chuck Jackson, 1984
- Todd Jones, 1989
- Kenny Lofton, 1988, 1989
- Julio Lugo, 1995
- Rob Mallicoat, 1984
- Dave Meads, 1984
- Brian Meyer, 1986
- Ray Montgomery, 1990
- Andy Mota, 1987, 1988
- James Mouton, 1991
- Bryant Nelson, 1994
- Al Osuna, 1987
- Shane Reynolds, 1989
- Oscar Robles, 1995
- Dave Rohde, 1986
- Sean Runyan, 1994
- Roger Samuels, 1983
- Brian Sikorski, 1995
- Mark Small, 1989
- Chris Truby, 1994
- Billy Wagner, 1993
- Jamie Walker, 1992
- Donne Wall, 1989
- Dan Walters, 1985
- Terry Wells, 1985
- Ed Whited, 1986
- Brian Williams, 1990
- Rhett Wiseman, 2015
- Robbie Wine, 1983

=== Other notable Auburn players ===
- Rick Dempsey (catcher)
- Ozzie Virgil (catcher)
- Ramon Castro (catcher)
- John Buck (catcher)
- Joe Pepitone (1st base)
- Ed Kranepool (1st base)
- David Cooper (1st base)
- Ken Boswell (2nd base)
- Aaron Hill (2nd base)
- Morgan Ensberg (3rd base)
- Ryan Roberts (3rd base)
- Julio Lugo (shortstop)
- R. C. Orlan (pitcher)
- Eugenio Vélez (shortstop)
- Cleon Jones (right field)
- Lonnie Smith (left field)
- Adam Lind (left field)
- Johan Santana (starting pitcher)
- Jerry Koosman (starting pitcher)
- Mel Stottlemyre (starting pitcher)
- Roy Oswalt (starting pitcher)
- Rollie Sheldon (starting pitcher)
- Robert Ray (starting pitcher)
- Brett Cecil (starting pitcher)
- Marc Rzepczynski (starting pitcher)
- Ricky Romero (starting pitcher)
- Shaun Marcum (starting pitcher)
- David Purcey (starting pitcher)
- Dustin McGowan (starting pitcher)
- Jesse Litsch (starting pitcher)
- Mike Zagurski (starting pitcher)
- Nick Pivetta (starting pitcher)
- Tug McGraw (bullpen)
- Billy Wagner (bullpen)
- Casey Janssen (bullpen)
- Brandon League (bullpen)
- David Bush (bullpen)
- Rafael Bautista

==== Future Major League Baseball staff ====
- Jeff Datz, an Indians, Orioles, and Mariners coach, played for the Auburn Astros in 1982 and 1984. As of 2011, Datz is the only former member of the Auburn Astros to reach MLB as both a player and a coach.
- Glenn Sherlock, a Yankees and Diamondbacks coach, played for the Auburn Astros in 1983 and 1984.
- Ken Bolek, an Indians coach in 1992 and 1993, was a coach for the 1985 Auburn Astros.
- Gary Tuck, a Yankees and Red Sox bullpen coach, was the Auburn Astros manager in 1987.
- Rick Aponte, former Nationals bullpen coach, was the Auburn Astros pitching coach in 1987.
- Ron Porterfield, head athletic trainer of the Rays, began his professional baseball career as the trainer for the 1988 Auburn Astros.
- Manny Acta, an Expos and Mets coach and then Nationals and Indians manager, managed the Auburn Astros from 1993 to 1995. He also managed the Auburn Doubledays, in 1996.

=== Front office and staff ===
- Steve DeSalvo was the team's general manager from 1982 to 1983. He went on to a long career as a Minor League Baseball executive.
- Auburn native Leslie Leary was general manager from 1984 to 1987. She was one of the first female general managers in Minor League Baseball.
- Auburn native Joe Kehoskie, a baseball agent, worked for the team from 1984 to 1991.
- Bob Neal, previously the general manager of the Watertown Pirates and Peninsula Pilots, was general manager from early 1988 to late 1989.
- John H. Graham, previously the general manager of the Peninsula Pilots, was assistant general manager from early 1988 to early 1989; business manager from early 1989 to late 1989; and general manager from late 1989 to late 1991.
- Marc Techman, an Auburn native, was assistant general manager in 1991.
- Shawn Smith, currently a vice president with the NBA, was general manager from 1994 to 1995.
- TV/radio announcer Cory Provus worked for the team in 2000.
- Charlie Wride was the team's public address announcer for most of the team's 14-season existence, as well as the team historian. Wride continued to work for the team's successor, the Auburn Doubledays, in a community relations capacity until his death in 2018 at the age of 81.
