= Reggie Waller =

American baseball player, manager, scout and executive (born 1955)

Reginald J. "Reggie" Waller (born April 6, 1955) is an American former minor league baseball player, manager, scout and baseball executive.

== Playing career ==
Waller was drafted by the Cincinnati Reds in the 19th round of the 1975 amateur draft out of San Diego City College. He began his professional career that season, hitting .316 in 68 games with the Billings Mustangs. In 1976, he played for the Tampa Tarpons, hitting .244 in 112 games. With the Tarpons again in 1977, his batting average worsened, as he hit only .233 in 127 games for them that year. In 1978, he played for the Shelby Reds, hitting .260 with 13 home runs in 128 games.

Waller wound up in the Houston Astros organization in 1979, splitting the season between the Daytona Beach Astros and Columbus Astros. He hit a combined .292 in 125 games that year. He played his final minor league season in 1980, hitting .250 in 120 games for the Columbus Astros.

Overall, Waller hit .262 in 680 minor league games, over the course of a six-year career.

== Post-playing career ==
Waller managed the Auburn Astros in 1989, leading them to a 35-42 record. Future major leaguers Kenny Lofton, Todd Jones, Shane Reynolds, Mark Small and Donne Wall played for him that season.

He also scouted for the Houston Astros and New York Yankees. In 1991, he was as special assistant to the general manager of the Seattle Mariners. He served as the scouting director for the San Diego Padres in 1992 and 1993, and in 1994 he was an assistant general manager for the Padres.

He was the first minority executive in San Diego Padres history. For over 30 years he was Co-Director of The San Diego School of Baseball along with Tony Gwynn, Alan Trammell, Dave Smith, Bob Cluck, and Brent Strom.

== Family ==
His brother, Ty Waller, played in the major leagues. Another brother, Kevin Waller, played in the minor leagues. His sons, Gerric Waller and Derric Waller, played in the minor leagues as well.
