= Bob Hartsfield =

American baseball manager and scout (1931–1999)

Hartsfield in 1982

Robert Milton Hartsfield (December 15, 1931 in Atlanta – January 25, 1999 in Roswell, Georgia), nicknamed Poochie, was an American minor league baseball player, manager, and scout.

== Playing career ==
Hartsfield played 11 seasons in the minors, from 1950 to 1961. In 1,086 games, he hit .273 with 32 home runs. In 1955, he hit .307 in 113 games, split between the Greenville Spinners and Atlanta Crackers.

== Scouting career ==
Hartsfield scouted for the Chicago Cubs in 1965 and from 1977 to 1981. From 1966 to 1970, he served as an Atlanta Braves scout. From 1971 to 1973, he served as a San Francisco Giants scout. He was a scout for the New York Yankees in 1988. In 1991, he was the Seattle Mariners major league advance scout. He was the scouting director for the Giants from 1994 to 1997.

== Managerial career ==
Hartsfield managed in the minors from 1974 to 1985, and again in 1992.

=== Year-by-year managerial record ===
| Year | Team | League | Record | Finish | Organization | Playoffs |
|---|---|---|---|---|---|---|
| 1974 | Decatur Commodores | Midwest League | 55-69 | 8th | San Francisco Giants | |
| 1975 | Cedar Rapids Giants | Midwest League | 41-87 | 10th | San Francisco Giants | |
| 1976 | Clinton Pilots | Midwest League | 59-70 | 6th | Co-op | |
| 1977 | Geneva Cubs | New York–Penn League | 31-40 | 8th | Chicago Cubs | |
| 1978 | Geneva Cubs | New York–Penn League | 51-20 | 2nd | Chicago Cubs | League Champs |
| 1979 | Geneva Cubs | New York–Penn League | 50-19 | 1st | Chicago Cubs | Lost League Finals |
| 1980 | Geneva Cubs | New York–Penn League | 48-26 | 2nd | Chicago Cubs | Lost League Finals |
| 1981 | Geneva Cubs | New York–Penn League | 41-34 | 5th | Chicago Cubs | |
| 1982 | Auburn Astros | New York–Penn League | 35-39 | 8th | Houston Astros | |
| 1983 | Auburn Astros | New York–Penn League | 43-31 | 4th | Houston Astros | |
| 1984 | Auburn Astros | New York–Penn League | 38-38 | 7th | Houston Astros | |
| 1985 | Auburn Astros | New York–Penn League | 47-31 | 2nd | Houston Astros | Lost League Finals |
| 1992 | Jacksonville Suns | Southern League | 68-75 | 7th | Seattle Mariners | |

== Personal life and death ==
Hartsfield's brother was baseball player and manager Roy Hartsfield. Bob Hartsfield was married and had two stepchildren.

Hartsfield also was a college basketball referee.

Hartsfield died of kidney failure on January 25, 1999.
