= Bob Bauer (baseball) =

American baseball player-manager (1930–2020)

Robert Henry Bauer (November 14, 1930 – December 6, 2020) was an American minor league baseball player and manager. He batted left-handed, threw right-handed, stood 5 ft 11 in (1.80 m) and weighed 170 lb (77 kg).

== Biography ==
Born in Decatur, Illinois on November 14, 1930, Bauer had a ten-year minor league playing career in the farm systems of the St. Louis Cardinals and the New York Yankees, where he was used primarily at third base, but also in right and left field. Late in his playing career, Bauer was a player-manager.

From 1953 to 1957, Bauer was part of the Cardinals system, making stops in Alexandria of the Evangeline League, Odessa of the Longhorn League, Lynchburg of the Piedmont League, Peoria of the Three-I League, and Winston-Salem of the Carolina League. His best season for the Cardinals was 1954, when he hit .320 and drove in 96 RBI for Odessa.

From 1958 to 1962, Bauer played and managed in the Yankees system, making stops in Greensboro of the Carolina League, Auburn of the New York–Penn League, and St. Petersburg and Ft. Lauderdale of the Florida State League as a player. His best season for the Yankees was 1959, when he hit .332 and drove in 74 RBI for Auburn.

1959 was also Bauer's first year as a player-manager. He managed Auburn in 1960 as well, leading the team to a third-place finish and a playoff berth. In 1961, he skippered the St. Petersburg Saints. In 1962, his last season as a player-manager, he led the Fort Lauderdale Yankees to a Florida State League championship.

Bauer left baseball for the 1963 and 1964 seasons, but returned to manage Johnson City of the Appalachian League in 1965 and 1966. In 1967, he managed the Greensboro Yankees in the Carolina League. When the Yankees moved their Carolina League affiliate from Greensboro to Kinston in 1968, he moved with them. He managed the Midwest League Danville Warriors in 1970, while they operated as a co-op team, and nine different major league teams provided players for their roster.

Bauer died in Decatur on December 6, 2020, at the age of 90.

== Sources ==
- Kinston Eagles 1968 Official Souvenir Scorebook
- The Professional Baseball Players Database 5.0
