= Frank Cacciatore =

American baseball coach

Biographical details
- Born: April 25, 1953 (age 73); Tampa, Florida, U.S.
- Education: Plant High School (1971) Seminole Jr. College (1973) Florida Southern College (1976) University of South Florida (1978)

Coaching career (HC unless noted)
- 1978-1982: Florida Southern College (assistant)
- 1983-1986: Palm Beach JC

Head coaching record
- Overall: 166-70-1

Accomplishments and honors

Championships
- NCAA Division II College World Series (1975)

Awards
- Florida Southern College Hall of Fame (2006) Florida Diamond Club Junior College Coach of the Year (1984)

Baseball career
Medals
Men's baseball
Representing United States
Amateur World Series
Gold medal – first place	1974 St. Petersburg	Team

Frank I. Cacciatore (born April 25, 1953, in Tampa, Florida) was an American minor league baseball coach and manager for more than 30 years and a former college baseball player and coach.

== Early life ==
At 15, Cacciatore was a starting pitcher for a West Tampa Little League team that reached the 1968 Little League national tournament. His father, who coached the senior boys team, helped found the West Tampa Little League in 1962. Cacciatore played football, basketball and baseball at Plant High School in Tampa, teaming up with former University of Florida wide receiver Lee McGriff.

== College career ==
In 1975, Cacciatore played right field for Florida Southern College, helping lead the Moccasins (36–10) to the 1975 NCAA Division II national title. He was named a second-team All-American that year and MVP of the Division II World Series. As a junior, he played for the United States national team at the 1974 Amateur World Series, held in St. Petersburg, Florida, after helping the Mocs to 23–15 record. Prior to Florida Southern, Cacciatore played at Seminole Junior College from 1972 to 1973.

== Minor leagues ==
In 1975, Cacciatore went undrafted out of college and signed a free agent contract with the Detroit Tigers. He initially played for the Class A Lakeland Tigers and hit .223 in 72 games. He moved up to the Class AA Montgomery Rebels in 1976 and appeared in nine games, batting .200 before being released.

== College coaching career ==
After his minor league playing career ended, Cacciatore coached baseball at the college level, first as an assistant coach at his alma mater, Florida Southern, from 1978 to 1982. In 1983, he succeeded Dusty Rhodes (baseball coach) as the head coach at Palm Beach Junior College, where he led a Pacers squad that included future Major League Baseball all-star Dante Bichette, to a state championship in 1984 and consecutive conference titles in 1983, 1984 and 1985. At PBJC, Cacciatore compiled an overall record of 166-70-1 from 1983 to 1986.

In 1986, he managed the Hyannis Mets, a collegiate summer baseball team in the Cape Cod Baseball League.

== Professional coaching career ==
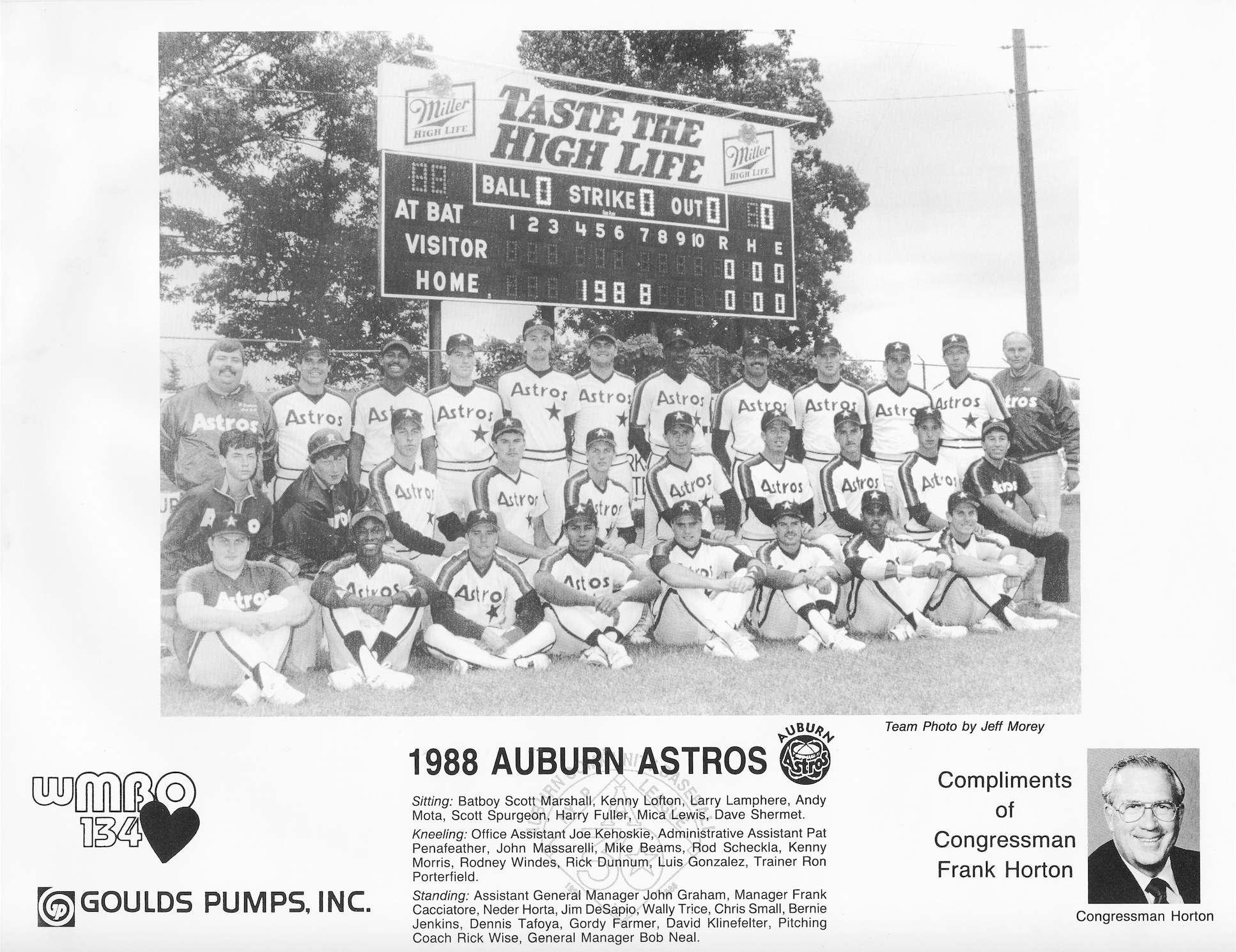
1988 Auburn Astros team photo

Cacciatore's first minor league managerial job came in 1988, when he was a last-minute replacement as manager of the Auburn Astros of the short-season Class A New York–Penn League. (Jim Coveney had been named manager of the Auburn Astros for 1988 but replaced Gary Tuck as manager of the Asheville Tourists in mid-season, before he had managed a single game for Auburn.) In Auburn, Cacciatore was the first professional manager of future Major League Baseball stars Luis Gonzalez and Kenny Lofton, both of whom were selected by the Houston Astros in the 1988 draft and assigned to Auburn to begin their professional baseball careers.

After spending a year coaching at Triple-A Tucson, he spent the 1990 and 1991 seasons as the skipper of the Asheville Tourists. He served as a coach of Double-A Shreveport when the Captains won the 1995 Eastern League title and was a coach with the Brevard County Manatees when they claimed a share of the Advanced-A Florida State League crown in 2001. By 2012, Cacciatore had managed seven different teams at the short-season Class A, full-season Class A, and Double-A levels of Minor League Baseball. Cacciatore has coached in the Houston Astros, San Francisco Giants, Florida Marlins, Montreal Expos/Washington Nationals, and New York Mets systems. He also served as the hitting coach for the Reading Fightin Phils.

== Retirement ==
After retiring from Minor League coaching in 2019, Cacciatore has served as a pitching coach for the Alpharetta Aviators, a collegiate summer team in the non-profit, wooden-bat Sunbelt Baseball League.

=== Minor League managerial record ===
Cacciatore managed the following minor league teams:

Year	Team	League	Record	Finish	Organization	Playoffs
1988	Auburn Astros	New York–Penn League	42-33	5th	Houston Astros	
1990	Asheville Tourists	South Atlantic League	66-77	9th	Houston Astros	
1991	Asheville Tourists	South Atlantic League	55-83	14th	Houston Astros	
1996	Shreveport Captains	Texas League	73-66	3rd	San Francisco Giants	
1997	San Jose Giants	California League	60-80	10th	San Francisco Giants	
1999	Portland Sea Dogs	Eastern League	65-77	9th (t)	Florida Marlins	
2006	Hagerstown Suns	South Atlantic League	58-82	14th	New York Mets	
2007	St. Lucie Mets	Florida State League	68-71	8th	New York Mets	Lost in 1st round
