= Gary Tuck =

American baseball coach (born 1954)

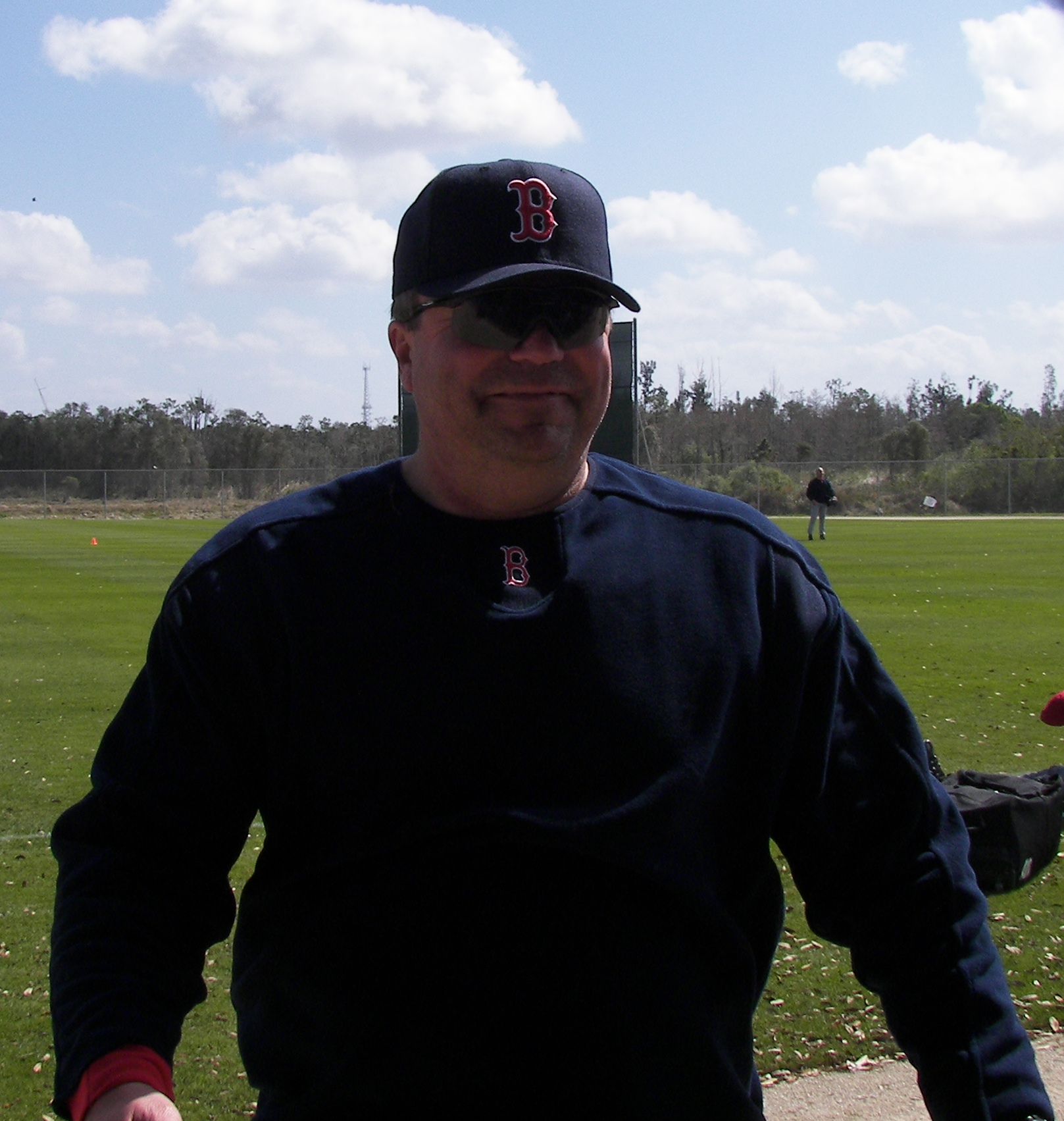
- Tuck during spring training in 2007
- Coach
- Born: September 6, 1954 (age 71); Amsterdam, New York, U.S.
- Bats: Right Throws: Right
- Stats at Baseball Reference

Teams
- As Coach: New York Yankees (1990, 1998–1999, 2003–2004, 2014–2015); Florida Marlins (2006); Boston Red Sox (2007–2012)

Career highlights and awards
- 3× World Series Champion (1998, 1999, 2007)

Gary Robert Tuck (born September 6, 1954) is an American former professional baseball player, coach, and manager. He played one game in Minor League Baseball as a catcher in 1978. He has coached in the minor leagues and in Major League Baseball for the New York Yankees, Florida Marlins, and Boston Red Sox.

== Early life ==
Tuck was born in Amsterdam, New York, and graduated from Indiana University. Tuck has 23 years of professional coaching experience. He started his baseball career as a catcher for the Montreal Expos organization and played for them during three minor league seasons. Following his playing retirement, he served as an assistant coach at the University of Notre Dame in 1980, and Arizona State University in 1981.

== Minor league career ==
After winning an NCAA championship with Arizona State, Tuck was hired to coach for the nearby Tucson Toros, a Minor League affiliate of the Houston Astros. Tuck spent eight years in the Astros organization. In 1986, he managed the Double-A Columbus Astros to a league championship, winning Southern League Manager of the Year honors.

By 1989, Tuck was a coach on the New York Yankees Triple-A team, the Columbus Clippers. In 1991, he was the manager of the Watertown Indians, the Single-A affiliate of the Cleveland Indians, a job he held before switching to a Scout for the Indians from 1992 to 1995.

Tuck rejoined the Yankees in 1996 as the manager of the Single-A Oneonta Yankees, where he spent the next two seasons.

== Major league career ==
=== New York Yankees (1990, 1997–99, 2003–04) ===
With the Yankees, Tuck served as the bullpen coach for the start of the 1990 season under manager Bucky Dent. Tuck, along with Dent, hitting coach Champ Summers and third base coach Joe Sparks, were all fired by the Yankees on June 7, 1990 after an 18-32 start to the season.

Tuck worked with Jorge Posada as a young player, and prepped him to eventually take over for starting catcher Joe Girardi. Posada's workload increased from 60 games in 1997 to 111 and 112 the next two seasons. He eventually took over the starting role in 2000.

Tuck won World Series rings as the team catching instructor in 1998 and 1999. He was not retained following the 1999 season.

Tuck returned to the Yankees prior to the 2003 season and spent the next two years as catching instructor. The team defeated the Red Sox in the 2003 American League Championship Series, and lost to them in the 2004 American League Championship Series.

He spent the 2005 season out of baseball.

=== Florida Marlins (2006) ===
In 2006, Joe Girardi was hired as the Marlins manager, and he hired Tuck as his bench coach. He was known for writing the lineup card in calligraphy. Girardi was fired following the season despite winning Manager of the Year.

=== Boston Red Sox (2007–12) ===
In November 2006, the Boston Red Sox hired Tuck as their new bullpen coach. He joined pitching coach John Farrell and hitting coach Dave Magadan as new members of the Red Sox coaching staff for the 2007 season. He earned another World Series ring as a member of Boston's 2007 championship team. Tuck also served as an organization-wide catching instructor during spring training. The Red Sox won the 2007 World Series with Tuck on the coaching staff. In his final season, he was noted for clashing with manager Bobby Valentine.

On January 29, 2013, he notified the Red Sox that he intended to retire effective immediately, ending his six-year tenure with the team. He spent the 2013 season out of baseball.

=== Return to New York (2014–2015) ===
Tuck rejoined the Yankees as their bullpen coach during the 2013–14 offseason. The team moved from the ninth best bullpen in 2013, to eighth best under Tuck. Despite the bullpen's success, the Yankees missed the postseason for their second consecutive year. Following the 2015 season, Tuck was let go by the Yankees.

Sporting positions
Preceded by Dave Cripe	Columbus Astros manager 1986	Succeeded by Tom Wiedenbauer
Preceded by Keith Bodie	Auburn Astros manager 1987	Succeeded by Frank Cacciatore
Preceded by Keith Bodie	Asheville Tourists manager 1988	Succeeded by Jim Coveney
Preceded by Jim Gabella	Watertown Indians manager 1991	Succeeded by Jim Gabella
Preceded by Rob Thomson	Oneonta Yankees manager 1996	Succeeded by Joe Arnold
Preceded by Harry Dunlop	Florida Marlins bench coach 2006	Succeeded by Carlos Tosca
Preceded by Al Nipper	Boston Red Sox bullpen coach 2007–2012	Succeeded by Dana LeVangie
Preceded by n/a Mike Harkey	New York Yankees bullpen coach 1990; 2014–2015	Succeeded by n/a Mike Harkey
