= Boyd Coffie =

- Catcher
- Born: November 6, 1937; Athens, Tennessee
- Died: May 2, 2006 (aged 68); Athens, Tennessee
- Batted: Right Threw: Right

Nebraska State League debut
- 1959, for the Kearney Yankees

Last Florida State League appearance
- 1966, for the Orlando Twins

Career statistics
- Batting average: .235
- Home runs: 24

Teams
- Playing career: Kearney Yankees (1959); Greensboro Yankees (1960); Binghamton Triplets (1961); Orlando Twins (1964–66); Managerial career: Auburn Twins (1968, 1970–71); Rollins Tars (1972–1991)

Career highlights and awards
- Florida Intercollegiate Conference MVP Award (1959); Florida Coach of the Year (1982); Florida Sports Hall of Fame inductee; North Carolina Sports Hall of Fame inductee

Howard Boyd Coffie (November 6, 1937 – May 2, 2006) was an American minor league baseball player, manager, college coach, scout and executive.

He attended McMinn County High School and then Rollins College.

== Playing career ==
In 1959, Coffie won the Florida Intercollegiate Conference MVP Award. He was an NAIA All-American in 1958 and 1959 While at Rollins College, he was also an All-Conference basketball player.

He began his professional career in 1959, playing in the New York Yankees chain from 1959 to 1961. His first season was spent with the Kearney Yankees, hitting .286 with 11 home runs in 56 games. He played for the Greensboro Yankees in 1960, and in 92 games his average dropped to .216, and he hit only five home runs. His averaged dropped again in 1961 to .211, as he played in 39 games for the Binghamton Triplets.

He missed 1962 and 1963 to military service, but from 1964 to 1966 he played for the Orlando Twins in the Minnesota Twins farm system. In his first year back, he hit .228 in 66 games. His averaged dropped to .206 in 1965, but he raised it to .251 in his final season, 1966.

Overall, Coffie batted .235 in 413 minor league games, over a span of six seasons.

== Managerial career ==
Coffie managed three years in the minor leagues.

=== Year-by-year managerial record ===
Year	Team	League	Record	Finish	Organization	Playoffs
1968	Auburn Twins	New York–Penn League	49-27	1st	Minnesota Twins	Lost League Finals
1970	Auburn Twins	New York–Penn League	43-26	1st	Minnesota Twins	League Champs
1971	Auburn Twins	New York–Penn League	42-28	2nd	Minnesota Twins	none

He also managed the Columbus Red Stixx for part of 1997 while manager Jack Mull was away on medical leave.

== Coaching career ==
Coffie was the head coach of the Rollins College baseball team from 1972 to 1991. He had a record of 586–419–6 at Rollins and was the Sunshine State Conference coach of the year in 1983 and 1986. In 1982, he was named the Florida Coach of the Year He holds the record for most wins by a coach in Rollins College history.

He also served as the head basketball coach at Rollins from 1962 to 1972, compiling a record of 94–145 He was honored with the Distinguished Achievement in Athletic Award by the Rollins College athletic department.

Following his retirement, he was enshrined in the Sunshine State Conference, Florida Sports and North Carolina Halls of Fame.

== Executive career ==
Coffie served as the farm director of the Cleveland Indians from 1993 to 1994. He was the Director of Instruction in minor league operations for the Indians in 1995. In 1996, he served as the Colorado Rockies minor league field coordinator. He also served as the Rockies' roving catching instructor.

== Death ==
Coffie died from cancer at the age of 68 in 2006. In his honor, a golf tournament known as the Boyd Coffie Golf Classic is played annually.
