= Falcon Park =

Stadium in Auburn, New York

- Interactive map of Falcon Park
- Location: 130 North Division Street; Auburn, New York 13021
- Coordinates: 42.9416°N 76.585232°W
- Owner: City of Auburn
- Operator: Auburn Community Baseball
- Capacity: 2,800
- Surface: AstroTurf GameDay Grass 3D
- Field size: Left Field: 330 feet Center Field: 400 feet Right Field: 330 feet

Construction
- Groundbreaking: January 1995; 31 years ago
- Opened: June 22, 1995; 31 years ago
- Cost: $3,145,000 ($6.65 million in 2025 dollars)
- Architect: Highland Associates
- General contractor: DeAngelo Construction Corp.

Tenants
- Auburn Doubledays (NYPL/PGCBL) 1995–present

Falcon Park is a stadium in Auburn, New York. The stadium is primarily used for baseball and is the home field of the Auburn Doubledays collegiate summer baseball team. The Auburn Maroons high school baseball team also plays its home games at the stadium.

The current, rebuilt facility opened in 1995 and holds 2,800 people. As of 2004, the venue's full name is Leo Pinckney Field at Falcon Park.

== Background ==
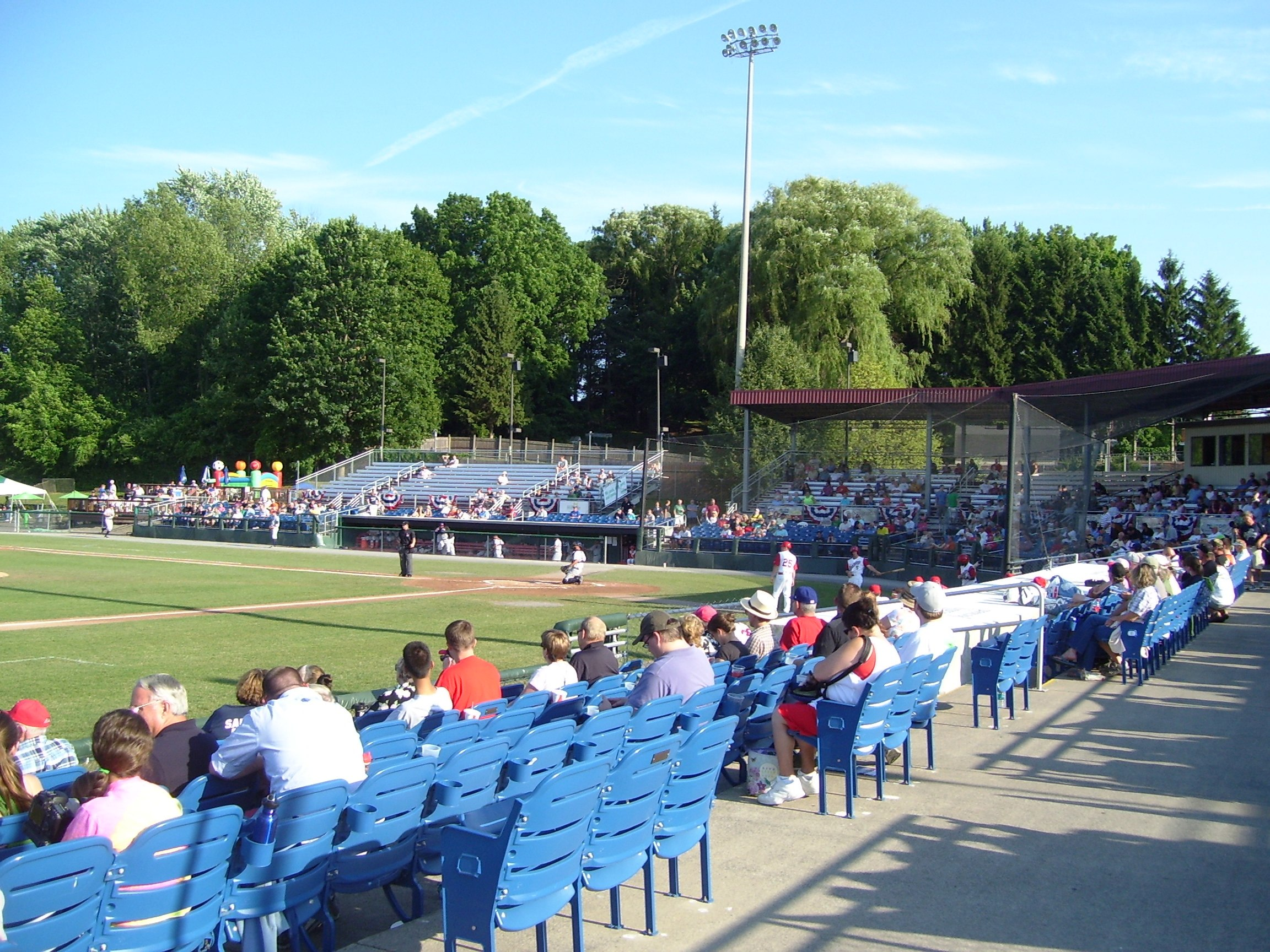
Falcon Park (2012)

Falcon Park was originally built in 1927 on the same site which currently houses the 1995 reconstructed facility. The stadium is called Falcon Park because it was built by a fraternal organization in Auburn called the Polish Falcons. The Polish Falcons owned the stadium until 1959, when the local minor league franchise purchased it. The City of Auburn purchased both the stadium and the franchise in 1981 by assuming the former team's unpaid debts.

Falcon Park was a typical old wooden grandstand-type facility from 1927 until 1995. The original park's demolition began seconds after the final out of the final game of the 1994 season, with a bulldozer crashing into the stadium by smashing through the center field fence. The scene was shown nationally on ESPN.

Permanent lights were first erected at Falcon Park in 1940, although some temporary construction lights were put in place in order to accommodate some night baseball in 1938. Before the stability of the present Auburn Doubledays franchise, professional minor league baseball was somewhat of a "come and go" proposition in Auburn. When the city had no team in 1957, the stadium was used as an auto racing speedway for children. The kids raced go-kart-type vehicles called microds on a one-tenth mile oval built on the ball diamond's infield. The races drew large crowds and the enterprise was featured in an article in Life Magazine. When the city had no team in 1981, the stadium was used for rock and roll concerts.

A few games were staged here in May and June 1969 by the Syracuse Chiefs of the International League while their home field MacArthur Stadium was being repaired after a fire.

== Teams ==
All of Auburn Community Baseball's entries in the New York-Penn League have played their home games at Falcon Park. Auburn's NY-P League team has operated under the following names:

- Auburn Yankees (1958–1961)
- Auburn Mets (1962–1966)
- Auburn Twins (1967–1971)
- Auburn Phillies (1972–1977)
- Auburn Sunsets (1978)
- Auburn Red Stars (1979)
- Auburn Americans (1980)
- Auburn Astros (1982–1995)
- Auburn Doubledays (1996–present)

After the cancelled 2020 minor league season, Major League Baseball took direct control of Minor League Baseball and discontinued short-season play. The Doubledays were not among the four teams invited to remain as full-season affiliates of the Washington Nationals, with whom they had been affiliated since 2011. The city and the team's ownership group are exploring options such as independent baseball or collegiate summer baseball for 2021.

== Notable players ==
Notable Major League Baseball players who played for Auburn in Falcon Park include:

- Ken Boswell
- Jim Bouton
- Ike Delock
- Rick Dempsey
- Morgan Ensberg
- Lucas Giolito
- Luis Gonzalez
- John Halama
- Aaron Hill
- Cleon Jones
- Todd Jones
- Jerry Koosman
- Ed Kranepool
- Phil Linz
- Kenny Lofton
- Tug McGraw
- Roy Oswalt
- Joe Pepitone
- Shane Reynolds
- Victor Robles
- Johan Santana
- Rollie Sheldon
- Lonnie Smith
- Juan Soto
- John Stephenson
- Mel Stottlemyre
- Billy Wagner

== Leo Pinckney Field ==
At the end of the 2004 NY-P season, the playing field at Falcon Park was named Leo Pinckney Field in honor of Auburn resident Leo Pinckney, who was instrumental in securing Auburn's New York-Penn league franchise in 1958. Pinckney was a former president of Auburn Community Baseball and a former president of the New York–Penn League, whose Pinckney Division is also named in Pinckney's honor.

As a result, the full name of the facility is now Leo Pinckney Field at Falcon Park, although it is still mostly known by its original, shorter name.
