= Tye Waller =

American baseball player (born 1957)

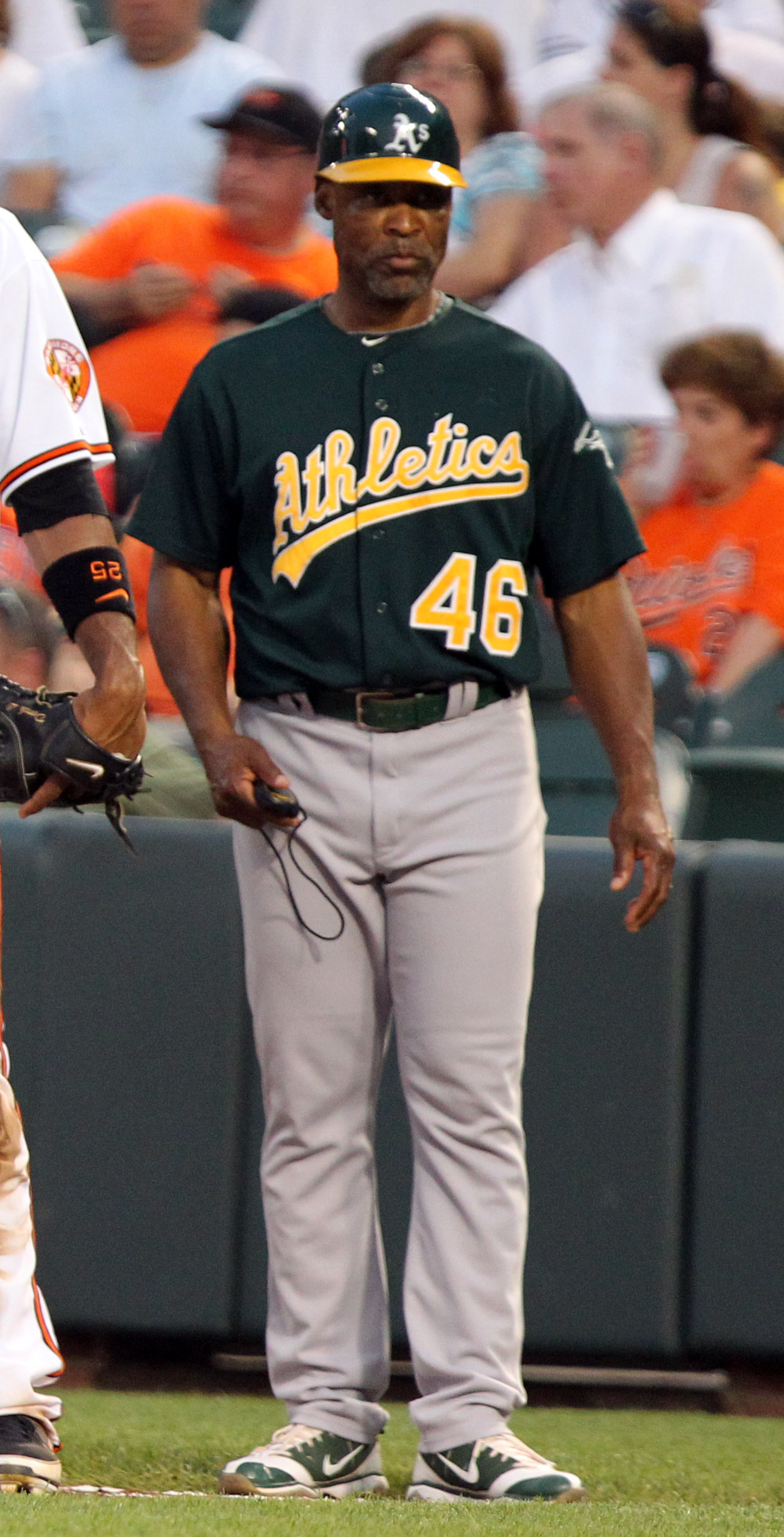
- Waller as first base coach for the Oakland Athletics in 2011
- Third baseman
- Born: March 14, 1957 (age 69); Fresno, California, U.S.
- Batted: Right Threw: Right

MLB debut
- September 6, 1980, for the St. Louis Cardinals

Last MLB appearance
- May 13, 1987, for the Houston Astros

MLB statistics
- Batting average: .236
- Home runs: 3
- Runs batted in: 14
- Stats at Baseball Reference

Teams
- As player: St. Louis Cardinals (1980); Chicago Cubs (1981–1982); Houston Astros (1987); As coach: San Diego Padres (1995); Oakland Athletics (2006–2015)

Elliott Tyrone Waller (born March 14, 1957), or more commonly known as Tye Waller or Ty Waller, is an American former professional baseball third baseman and coach. He was a coach for the Oakland Athletics of Major League Baseball (MLB) from 2007 to 2015.

== Playing career ==
Waller was drafted by the San Francisco Giants in the 33rd round of the 1975 Major League Baseball draft, but did not sign. He was drafted by the St. Louis Cardinals in the 4th round of the 1977 January amateur draft, and signed in May.

After the 1980 season, St. Louis sent Waller to the Chicago Cubs as the player to be named later in an earlier trade that sent Leon Durham and Ken Reitz for Bruce Sutter. After the 1982 season, he was traded by the Cubs to the Chicago White Sox for Reggie Patterson. After the 1983 season, Waller signed with the Houston Astros as a free agent.

== Personal ==
Waller also worked in the Padres organization for 19 years, as a coach, manager, and as a roving instructor in player development. Tye also became a baseball executive. His brother, Reggie Waller, became a baseball executive. Another brother, Kevin Waller, played in the minor leagues. His nephews, Gerric and Derric, played in the minor leagues as well.
