= Dana LeVangie =

American professional baseball coach (born 1969)

- Pitching coach
- Born: August 11, 1969 (age 57); Whitman, Massachusetts, U.S.
- Bats: Right Throws: Right
- Stats at Baseball Reference

Teams
- As coach: Boston Red Sox (1997–2004, 2013–2019)

Career highlights and awards
- 3× World Series champion (2004, 2013, 2018)

Dana Alan LeVangie (born August 11, 1969) is an American professional baseball scout and coach, who was the pitching coach for the Boston Red Sox of Major League Baseball (MLB) in 2018 and 2019. Formerly a scout and minor league catcher, as an active player he both batted and threw right-handed and was listed at 5 feet 10 inches (1.78 m) and 185 pounds (84 kg). He spent 36 years in the Boston organization.

== Early years ==
A native of Whitman, Massachusetts, LeVangie graduated from Whitman-Hanson Regional High School in 1987; he then attended Cape Cod Community College in West Barnstable, Massachusetts (1987–1989), and American International College (AIC) in Springfield, Massachusetts (1989–1991). He was a catcher on the AIC Yellow Jackets baseball team for two seasons (1990–1991). As a senior, LeVangie batted .473 with 13 home runs and 87 RBIs, (Note: AIC HOF page cites .462, 13 HR, 75 RBIs) and was named 1991 Division II Northeast Player of the Year. He was selected by the Red Sox in the 14th round of the 1991 MLB draft.

== Playing career ==
LeVangie signed with the Red Sox in June 1991, and played in the Boston farm system through 1996. He mostly played at the Class A-Advanced and Double-A levels, along with eight games in Triple-A. He was a career .196 hitter with seven home runs and 78 RBIs in 351 games played. LeVangie participated in spring training replacement games in 1995, during the 1994–95 MLB strike.

== Post-playing career ==
LeVangie became the bullpen catcher for the 1997 Red Sox, and served in that role for eight years, through the 2004 Red Sox championship season. He then worked as a scout for the Red Sox for eight seasons, serving as a pro scout in 2005 and an advance scout from 2006 through 2012.

In 2013, LeVangie was named to succeed Gary Tuck as bullpen coach for the Red Sox. He held that role until mid-August 2015, when he became interim bench coach for the Red Sox, one of several coaching reassignments caused by manager John Farrell's medical leave of absence for the successful treatment of lymphoma. LeVangie returned to his role as the Red Sox' bullpen coach for the 2016 and 2017 seasons.

LeVangie replaced Carl Willis as Boston pitching coach on November 8, 2017, on the staff of new manager Alex Cora. The first non-pitcher to hold that role for the Red Sox since Mike Roarke in 1994, LeVangie received credit for his contributions to Boston's 108-win 2018 regular season, its American League pennant, and World Series championship. The Red Sox finished third in their league in team earned run average (3.75), then won 11 of 14 post-season games to capture their ninth world title.

On October 8, 2019, the Red Sox announced that LeVangie would not return as the team's pitching coach for the 2020 season, but would stay with the team as a pro scout. He remained in that role through 2026 before departing the Boston organization to become a member of the Kansas City Royals' professional scouting staff.

== Personal life ==
LeVangie was inducted to the AIC Yellow Jackets Hall of Fame in 2006. As of November 2017, LeVangie lives in East Bridgewater, Massachusetts, with his wife and two children.

== Notes ==
Sporting positions
Preceded by Gary Tuck	Boston Red Sox bullpen coach 2013–2017	Succeeded by Craig Bjornson
Preceded by Carl Willis	Boston Red Sox pitching coach 2018–2019	Succeeded by Dave Bush
