= Auburn Community Baseball =

Auburn Community Baseball (also known as Auburn Community Baseball Inc. and formally Auburn Community Owned Non-Profit Baseball Association, Inc.) is a non-profit company based in Auburn, New York and is the owner of the Auburn Doubledays baseball club in the Perfect Game Collegiate Baseball League. Auburn Community Baseball has been the parent organization of the Doubledays since the team's establishment in 1982 as the Auburn Astros. The company also operated predecessor teams in Auburn before the Doubledays, dating back to 1958. Every Auburn professional baseball team that was owned by Auburn Community Baseball including the current team, the Doubledays, have all played in the New York–Penn League.

Auburn Community Baseball is based at Leo Pinckney Field at Falcon Park, which is located at 130 North Division Street in Auburn.

== Background ==
Unlike most professional sports teams which are owned by one or more private individuals and/or companies, Auburn Community Baseball is owned by the City of Auburn, New York. In large part because of the team's rare community-owned status, Auburn was immune to the wave of team relocations that saw many communities lose their affiliated baseball teams during the new-stadium construction boom in the 1990s and early 2000s (decade). As a result, Auburn — 2010 population: 27,700 — is one of the smallest communities in the United States with an affiliated minor league baseball team.

== History ==
After losing its last professional baseball team, the Auburn Falcons of the Border League, in 1951, Auburn went without professional baseball from 1952 to 1957. In the late 1950s, a group of Auburn residents undertook an effort to bring professional baseball back to Auburn. Among this group were Leo Pinckney, Ed Ward, and Dr. Thomas Stapleton. The group collected money by selling stock in the team, sometimes by going door to door.

In late 1957, they convinced New York Yankees executive Lee MacPhail to locate a Yankees farm team in Auburn, with games to be played at the original Falcon Park. The Auburn Yankees began play in 1958, which began a long run of New York–Penn League baseball in Auburn that, with the exception of a one-year absence from professional baseball in 1981, has continued almost uninterrupted to the present day.

== Teams ==
Auburn Community Baseball's entry in the New York–Penn League has operated under the following names:

- Auburn Yankees (1958–1961)
- Auburn Mets (1962–1966)
- Auburn Twins (1967–1971)
- Auburn Phillies (1972–1977)
- Auburn Sunsets (1978)
- Auburn Red Stars (1979)
- Auburn Americans (1980)
- Auburn Astros (1982–1995)
- Auburn Doubledays (1996–2020)

== League champions ==
Auburn Community Baseball's entry in the New York–Penn League has won league championships in the following years:

- 1962, 1964, 1966 – Auburn Mets
- 1967, 1970 – Auburn Twins
- 1973 – Auburn Phillies
- 1998 (co-champs), 2007 – Auburn Doubledays

== Wall of Fame ==
The Auburn Community Baseball Wall of Fame was created in 2006. The following people have been honored with induction:

Player category:

- Mel Stottlemyre (2006)
- Tug McGraw (2007)
- Jerry Koosman (2008)
- Ed Kranepool (2009)

Contributor category:

- Leo Pinckney
- Vince Klein
- Dr. Thomas Stapleton
- Bill Graney
- Charlie Wride (2007)
- State Sen. Michael Nozzolio
- Chuck Savage
- Barney Hearn
- Art Fritz
- Charlie Lynch
- Joe Graceffo
- Pat Penafeather (2010)

== Notable former front office and staff ==
- Steve DeSalvo was the team's general manager from 1982 to 1983. He went on to a long career as a Minor League Baseball executive.
- Auburn native Leslie Leary was general manager from 1984 to 1987. She was one of the first female general managers in Minor League Baseball.
- Auburn native Joe Kehoskie, a baseball agent, worked for the team from 1984 to 1991.
- Bob Neal, previously the general manager of the Watertown Pirates and Peninsula Pilots, was general manager from early 1988 to late 1989.
- John H. Graham, previously the general manager of the Peninsula Pilots, was assistant general manager from early 1988 to early 1989; business manager from early 1989 to late 1989; and general manager from late 1989 to late 1991.
- Marc Techman, an Auburn native, was assistant general manager in 1991.
- Shawn H. P. Smith, currently an executive with the Boston Red Sox, and previously a vice president with the NBA, was general manager from 1994 to 1995.
- Matthew Kastel, began his career with the Auburn Astros in 1985, vending beer and working on the grounds crew; later he would go on to be a director with the Houston Astros, President of the Stadium Managers Association, and for 18 years served as Stadium Manager of Oriole Park at Camden Yards for the Maryland Stadium Authority.
- TV/radio announcer Cory Provus worked for the team in 2000.
- Charlie Wride was the team's public address announcer for much of the 1980s and 1990s, as well as the team and league historian. Wride continued to work for the team in a community relations capacity until his death in 2018 at the age of 81.

== Gallery ==
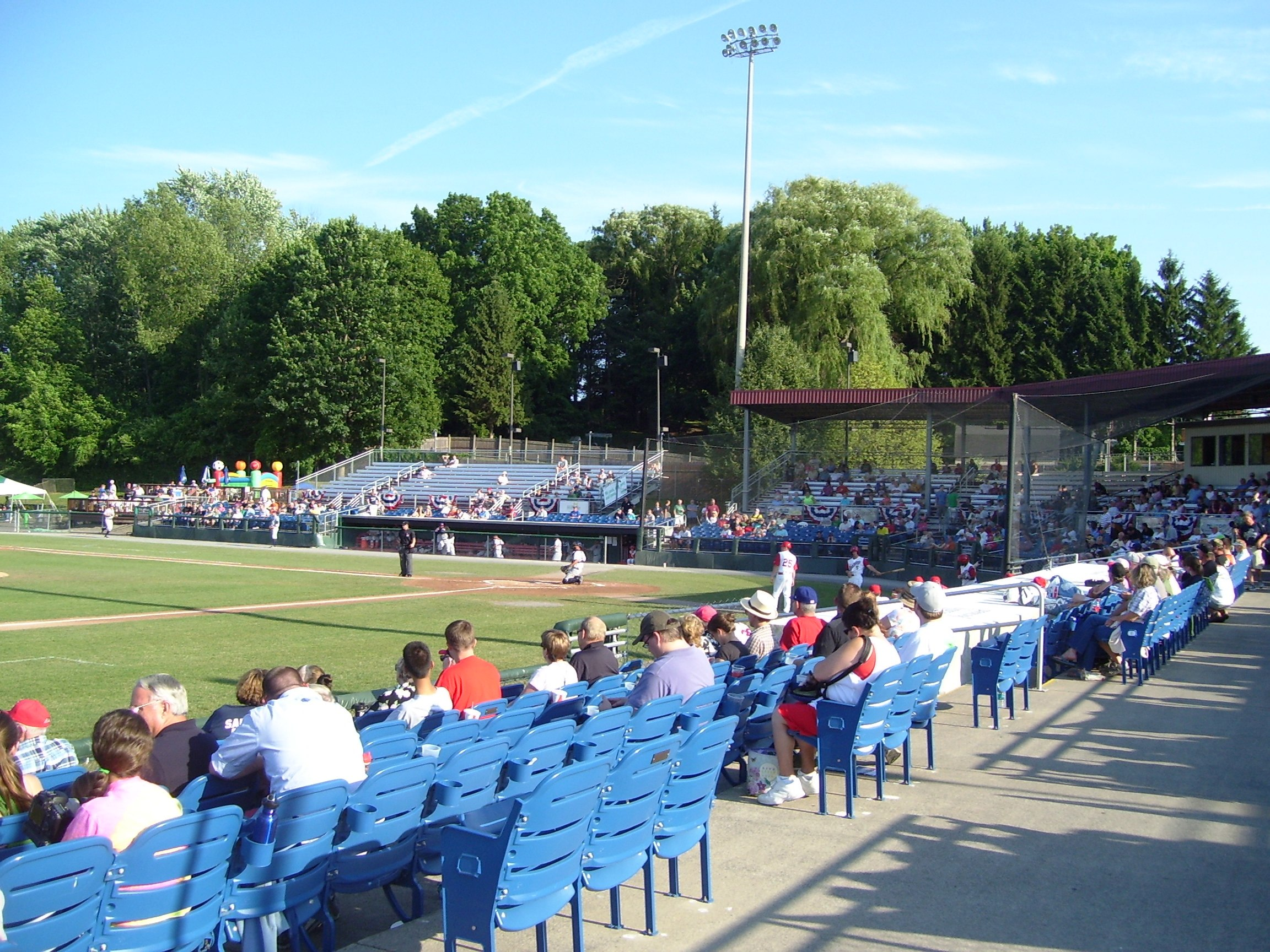
Auburn Doubledays game (2012)

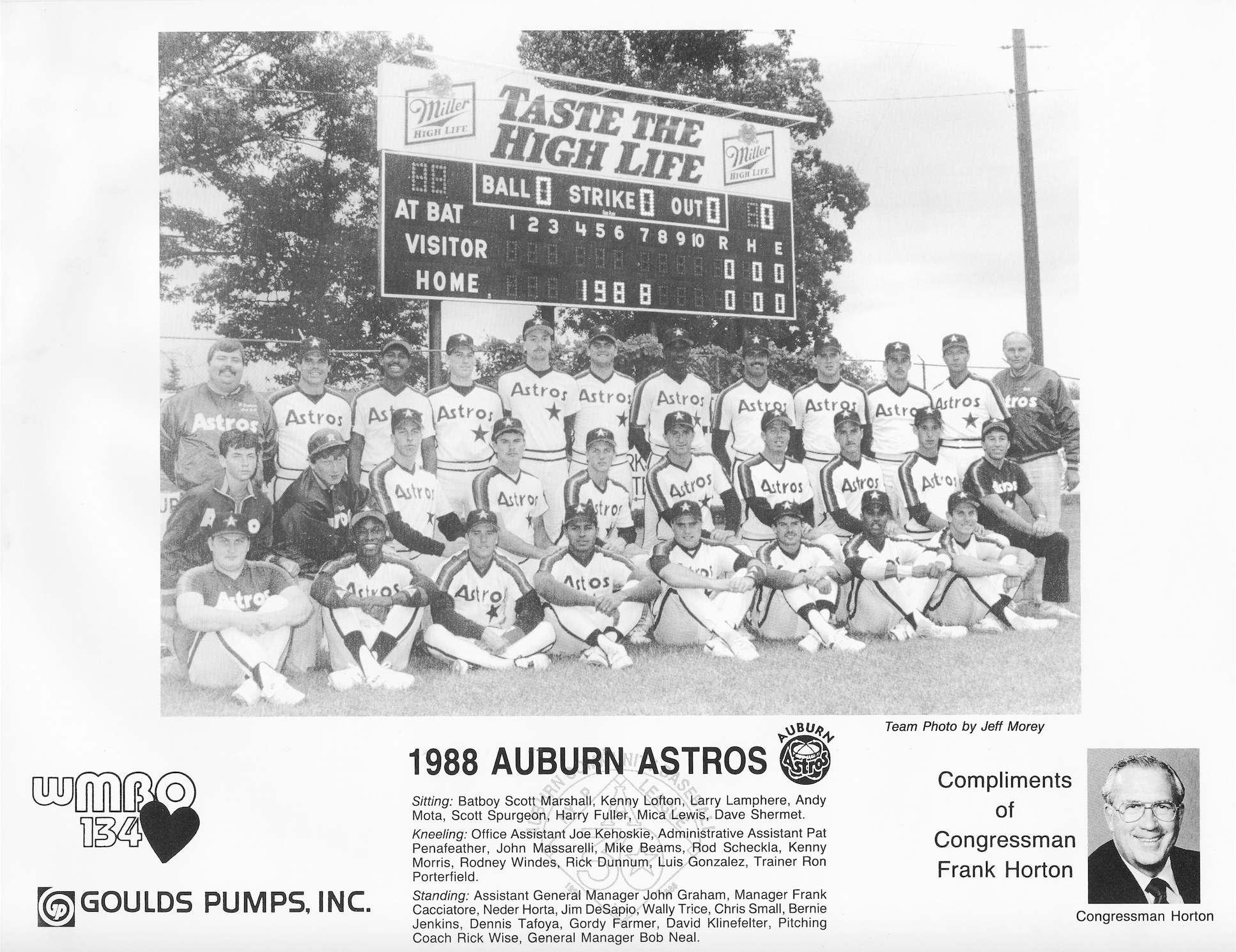
1988 Auburn Astros team photo
