= Jim Czajkowski =

American baseball player (born 1963)

- Pitcher
- Born: December 18, 1963 (age 61); Parma, Ohio, U.S.
- Batted: Both Threw: Right

MLB debut
- July 29, 1994, for the Colorado Rockies

Last MLB appearance
- August 9, 1994, for the Colorado Rockies

MLB statistics
- Win–loss record: 0–0
- Earned run average: 4.15
- Strikeouts: 2
- Stats at Baseball Reference

Teams
- Colorado Rockies (1994)

Jim Mark Czajkowski (born December 18, 1963) is an American former Major League Baseball pitcher who played for one season. He pitched for the Colorado Rockies in five games during the 1994 Colorado Rockies season.

In 2012, Czajkowski was the pitching coach for the Toronto Blue Jays' Northwest League affiliate Vancouver Canadians.

On January 13, 2014, Czajkowski was named as the pitching coach for the Toronto Blue Jays Double-A affiliate New Hampshire Fisher Cats.

Czajkowski was announced as the pitching coach for the Class A-Advanced Dunedin Blue Jays in 2019. He had previously coached there in 2016.

Czajowski was named the pitching coach for the Double A New Hampshire Fisher Cats for the 2021 season. He would remain the pitching coach for the Fisher Cats until September 2022.
