= Mike Harkey =

American baseball player and coach (born 1966)

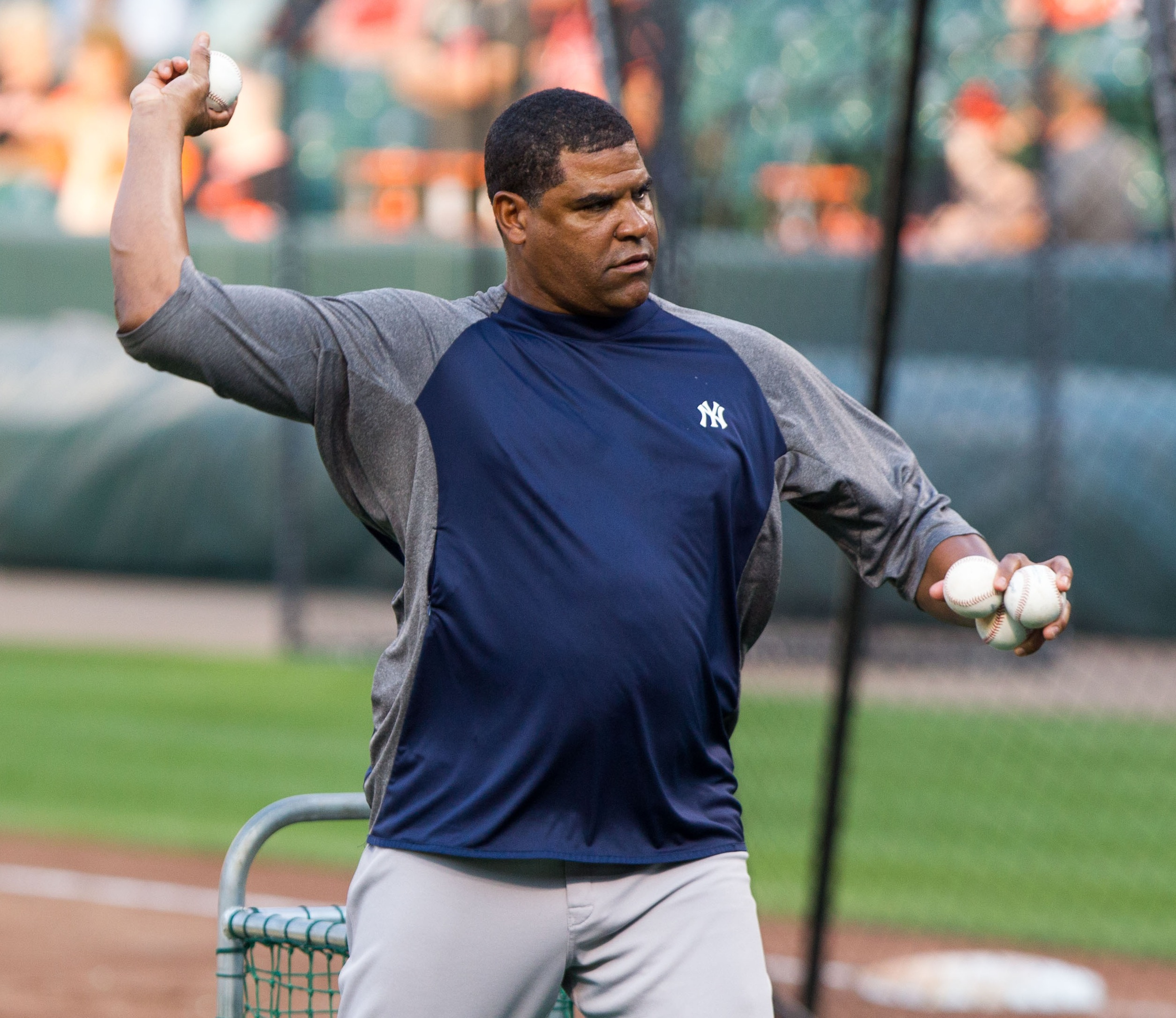
- Harkey throwing batting practice in 2012
- Pitcher / Coach
- Born: October 25, 1966 (age 59); San Diego, California, U.S.
- Batted: Right Threw: Right

MLB debut
- September 5, 1988, for the Chicago Cubs

Last MLB appearance
- September 28, 1997, for the Los Angeles Dodgers

MLB statistics
- Win–loss record: 36–36
- Earned run average: 4.49
- Strikeouts: 316
- Stats at Baseball Reference

Teams
- As player: Chicago Cubs (1988, 1990–1993); Colorado Rockies (1994); Oakland Athletics (1995); California Angels (1995); Los Angeles Dodgers (1997); As coach: Florida Marlins (2006); New York Yankees (2008–2013); Arizona Diamondbacks (2014–2015); New York Yankees (2016–2025)

Career highlights and awards
- World Series champion (2009)

Michael Anthony Harkey (born October 25, 1966) is an American former professional baseball player and coach. He played in Major League Baseball (MLB) as a right-handed pitcher from 1988 to 1997 for the Chicago Cubs, Colorado Rockies, Oakland Athletics, California Angels, and Los Angeles Dodgers.

After his playing career, Harkey became a coach for the Florida Marlins in 2006 and the New York Yankees from 2008 through 2013, before joining the Arizona Diamondbacks, who he coached in 2014 and 2015. He returned to the Yankees in 2016 and served as their bullpen coach through 2025.

== Playing career ==
=== Amateur career ===
Harkey was born in San Diego, California, where he attended Ganesha High School in Pomona and California State University, Fullerton, where he played college baseball for the Cal State Fullerton Titans.

=== Chicago Cubs ===
The Chicago Cubs selected Harkey with the fourth overall selection of the 1987 Major League Baseball draft. Seattle Mariners owner George Argyros had plans to draft him with the first overall pick (as he liked the fact that he was from California and also thought he could make it to the majors faster), but was eventually convinced to draft Ken Griffey Jr. instead.

That year, Harkey went 2–3 with a 3.55 ERA in 12 starts for the Peoria Chiefs in A-ball. He finished the season in Double-A with the Pittsfield Cubs. Harkey started the 1988 season in Pittsfield, where he pitched to a 9–2 record with a 1.37 ERA. He was promoted to Triple-A Iowa, where he was 7–2 with a 3.55 ERA. Harkey was called up to the Cubs in September. He pitched to a 2.60 ERA in five starts.

Expected to be in Chicago's starting rotation in 1989, Harkey tried to pitch through shoulder tendinitis and worsened the problem. The Cubs placed him on the disabled list to start the year and sent him back to Triple-A. After 12 games with the Iowa Cubs, he tore cartilage in his knee and missed the rest of the season.

Harkey regained the velocity on his fastball and was placed in the Cubs 1990 rotation. He finished the season with a record of 12–6 and 3.26 earned run average in 173.2 innings, and finished fifth in the National League Rookie of the Year voting. In 1991, Harkey pitched in four games before going down with a shoulder injury. He underwent surgery to repair a cartilage tear and missed the rest of the season.

Harkey didn't return to the majors until July 20, 1992. On September 6, he attempted a cartwheel in the Wrigley Field outfield during pregame warmups and suffered a ruptured patella tendon, ending his season. On June 20, 1993, the Cubs placed Harkey on the disabled list with shoulder tendinitis. He finished the season with a 5.26 ERA in 28 starts.

=== Colorado Rockies ===
Harkey signed with the Colorado Rockies for the strike-shortened 1994 season. He lost his spot in the rotation, ultimately pitching to a 5.79 ERA in 91.2 innings (13 starts).

=== Oakland Athletics ===
He signed with the Oakland Athletics for the 1995 season, pitching to a 6.27 ERA in 66 innings before he was designated for assignment in July.

=== California Angels ===
On July 19, 1995, the California Angels claimed Harkey off waivers and plugged him into their rotation. On September 30, he pitched 6.2 innings of shutout baseball in a must-win game against Oakland to help the Angels force a one-game playoff with the Seattle Mariners.

=== Los Angeles Dodgers ===
Harkey signed with the Los Angeles Dodgers for the 1996 season, but spent the entire year with the Albuquerque Isotopes in Triple-A. He re-upped with the Dodgers for the 1997 season and was called up on June 23 to pitch out of the bullpen. He appeared in 10 games over multiple stints with the major league club that year.

== Coaching career ==
Harkey served as a minor league pitching coach for San Diego Padres affiliates the Rancho Cucamonga Quakes in 2000, Fort Wayne Wizards in 2001 and 2003, Lake Elsinore Storm in 2002 and 2004, and Mobile BayBears in 2005, as well as the Chicago Cubs affiliate Iowa Cubs in 2007. He served as the bullpen coach for the Florida Marlins in 2006.

Harkey joined the Yankees for the 2008 season. Under Harkey, the Yankees bullpen played a major role in their success during the 2009 season, culminating in a victory in the 2009 World Series. He served as the bullpen coach for six seasons.

After the 2013 season, he was hired as the Diamondbacks' pitching coach. The Diamondbacks fired Harkey after the 2015 season. He returned to the Yankees as their bullpen coach for the 2016 season. Harkey's contract was not renewed for the 2026 season.

== Personal life ==
Harkey's son, Tony, is a former infielder for the Cal State-Fullerton Titans and Concordia University Irvine baseball team. Tony won a NAIA World Series title in 2011 with the Concordia University Irvine Eagles. His son Cory Harkey was a tight end for the Los Angeles Rams, and is now serving as the assistant special teams coach for the Green Bay Packers.

== Notes ==
Sporting positions
Preceded by Luis Dorante	Florida Marlins bullpen coach 2006	Succeeded by Steve Foster
Preceded by Joe Kerrigan; Gary Tuck	New York Yankees bullpen coach 2008–2013; 2016–2025	Succeeded by Gary Tuck; Vacant
Preceded by Charles Nagy	Arizona Diamondbacks pitching coach 2014–2015	Succeeded by Mike Butcher
