= Rocket Wheeler =

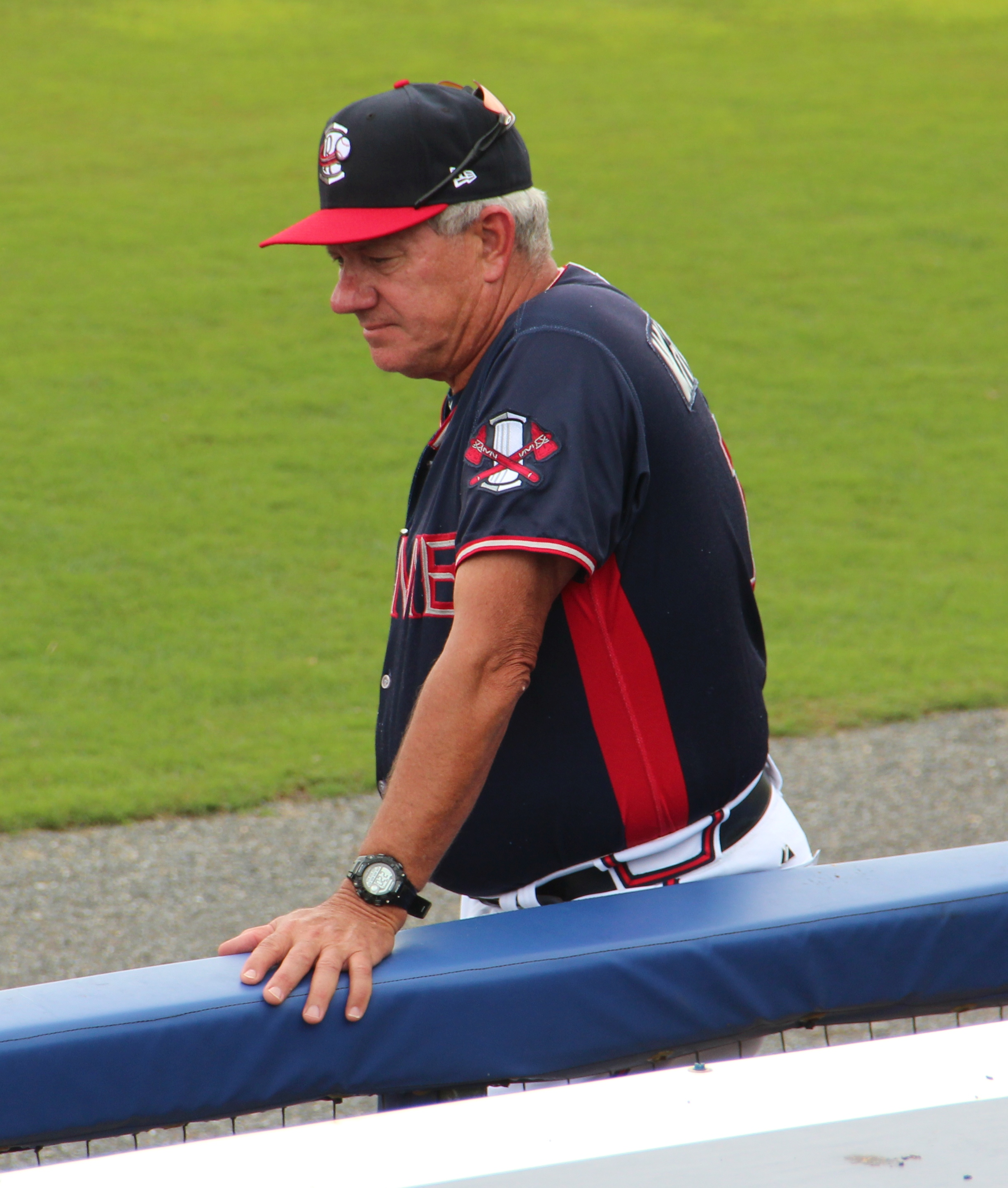
- Wheeler with the Rome Braves in 2018
- Infielder
- Born: January 11, 1955 (age 71); Houston, Texas
- Bats: Right Throws: Right
- Stats at Baseball Reference

Ralph Norman "Rocket" Wheeler (born January 11, 1955, at Houston, Texas) is a former minor league infielder and the current minor league manager for the Class A Short Season Auburn Doubledays. Wheeler attended the University of Houston where he obtained his nickname "Rocket" for his speed and hustle.

Wheeler was drafted by the Toronto Blue Jays in 1977. He played in the Blue Jays farm system until 1982, including stints with the Florence Blue Jays and the Kinston Eagles. He was honored by the Kinston Indians by being inducted into the Kinston Professional Baseball Hall of Fame in 2006.

He stayed with the Blue Jays system when he began his managerial career in 1985. He managed the Medicine Hat Blue Jays, the GCL Blue Jays, the St. Catharines Stompers, the Dunedin Blue Jays, and the Tennessee Smokies. After the 2002 season, Wheeler was let go by the Toronto front office, and he moved over to the Atlanta Braves farm system managing the Rome Braves (2003–05) and the Myrtle Beach Pelicans (2006-2010). Wheeler was named the manager of the Mississippi Braves on November 18, 2010. On June 22, 2017 he was named the manager of the Florida Fire Frogs of the Florida State League. Wheeler returned to the Braves organization as manager of the Rome Braves for the 2018 season, he will manage the Auburn Doubledays for the 2019 season.
