= Greg W. Harris =

American baseball player (born 1963)

Greg Harris
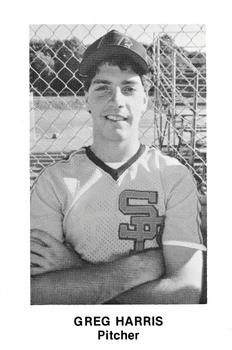
- Pitcher
- Born: December 1, 1963 (age 62); Greensboro, North Carolina, U.S.
- Batted: Right Threw: Right

MLB debut
- September 14, 1988, for the San Diego Padres

Last MLB appearance
- August 2, 1995, for the Minnesota Twins

MLB statistics
- Win–loss record: 45–64
- Earned run average: 3.98
- Strikeouts: 605
- Stats at Baseball Reference

Teams
- San Diego Padres (1988–1993); Colorado Rockies (1993–1994); Minnesota Twins (1995)

Gregory Wade Harris (born December 1, 1963) is an American former professional baseball player who pitched in the Major Leagues from 1988 through 1995.

Greg Harris was drafted by the San Diego Padres out of Elon University in the 10th round of the 1985 amateur draft. Harris threw a no-hitter while playing for the Wichita Pilots, the AA affiliate of the Padres in 1987, and was named the organization's Minor League Pitcher of the Year. Primarily a relief pitcher in his early days with the Padres, he transitioned back into the starting rotation in 1991. His go-to pitch was a big, sweeping curveball. As of 2026, his career 2.95 ERA with the Padres is the second-best ERA in team history (minimum 500 innings pitched), behind only Trevor Hoffman.

Harris and fellow pitcher Bruce Hurst were shipped off to the Colorado Rockies during the Padres 1993 fire sale, and later finished his career with the Minnesota Twins.

Harris' post-career San Diego superior court cases detailed scams and conspiracies that led to financial mismanagement and botched surgeries on his pitching arm and shoulder. The first case, against his surgeon, ended in 1999 with a $6 million verdict in Harris' favor.

During his career, Harris was often known as Greg W. Harris to differentiate him from fellow pitcher Greg A. Harris, whose career (1981–1995) entirely overlapped his.

== Pitching stats ==
- 243 Games
- 45 Wins
- 64 Losses
- 16 Saves
- 605 Strikeouts
- 3.98 ERA
