= Bruce Walton (baseball) =

American baseball player & coach (born 1962)

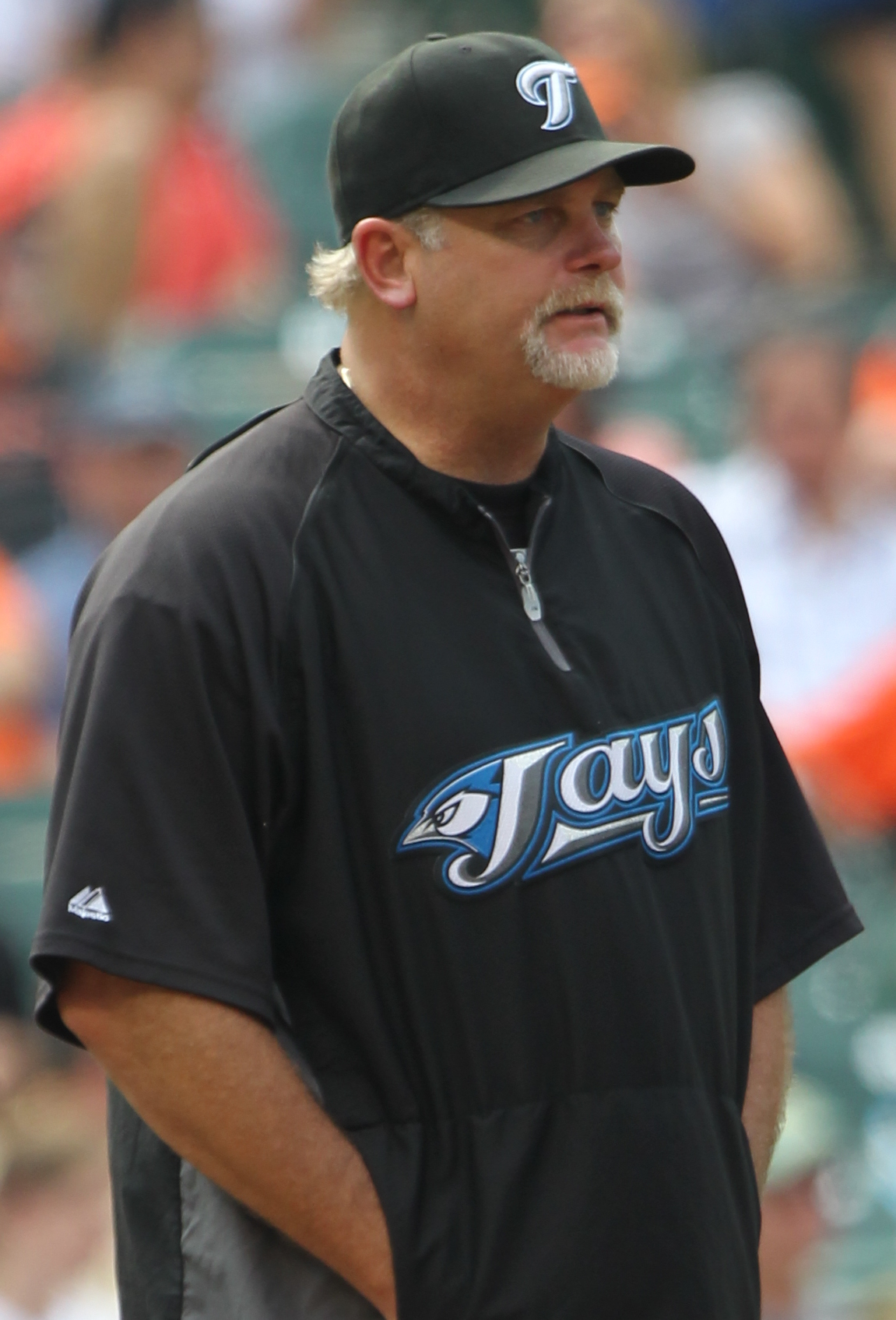
- Walton with the Toronto Blue Jays in 2011
- Pitcher
- Born: December 25, 1962 (age 63); Bakersfield, California, U.S.
- Batted: Right Threw: Right

MLB debut
- May 11, 1991, for the Oakland Athletics

Last MLB appearance
- July 4, 1994, for the Colorado Rockies

MLB statistics
- Win–loss record: 2–0
- Earned run average: 8.21
- Strikeouts: 18
- Stats at Baseball Reference

Teams
- As player: Oakland Athletics (1991–1992); Montreal Expos (1993); Colorado Rockies (1994); As coach: Toronto Blue Jays (2002–2012)

Bruce Kenneth Walton (born December 25, 1962, Bakersfield, CA) is an American professional baseball coach and former player who is the pitching coach for the Jacksonville Jumbo Shrimp. He was a pitcher in Major League Baseball (MLB) from 1991 to 1994, with the Oakland Athletics, Montreal Expos, and Colorado Rockies.

== Career ==
Walton became the bullpen coach for the Toronto Blue Jays on June 7, 2002. He was the pitching coach for the Blue Jays from October 30, 2009 to November 26, 2012.

In a game against the Seattle Mariners on September 13, 2012, Walton was struck by a piece of Edwin Encarnación's broken bat, and left the bench with forearm contusions.

Walton was appointed as the pitching coach of the Triple-A Iowa Cubs on December 18, 2013. Before the 2015 season, he retired and moved to Calgary, Alberta, and was replaced by Mike Cather.

Walton was named as the pitching coach for the Jupiter Hammerheads in the Miami Marlins organization for the 2018 season.

Walton was named as the pitching coach for the Double-A Jacksonville Jumbo Shrimp of the Miami Marlins organization for the 2019 season.
