= Ryan Adams discography =

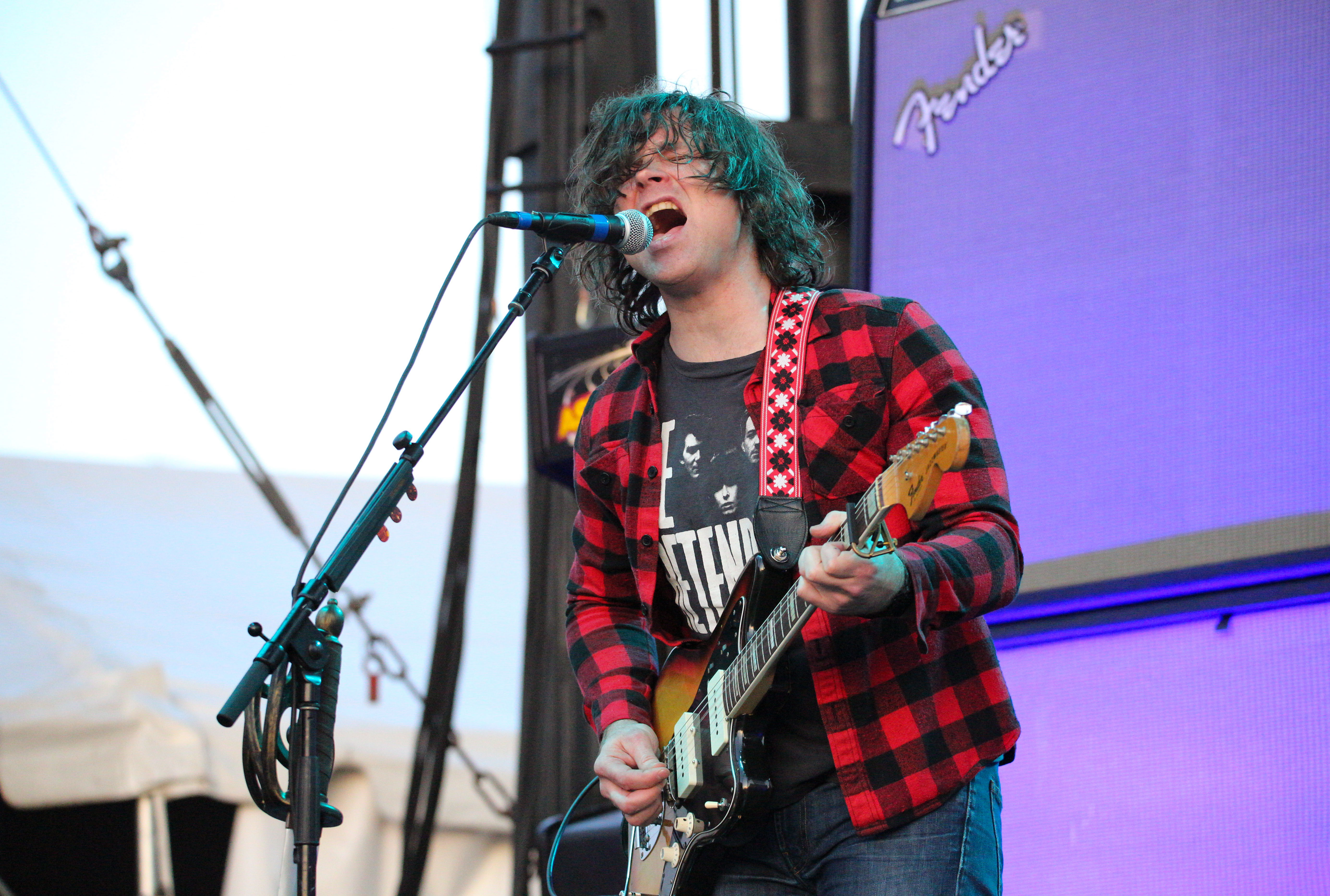
- Adams performing in 2016
- Studio albums: 30
- Extended plays: 11
- Live albums: 4
- Singles: 25

This is the discography of the American singer-songwriter Ryan Adams.

== Studio albums ==
=== Solo ===
List of studio albums, with selected chart positions
Title	Album details	Peak chart positions										Certifications (sales thresholds)
Title	Album details	US	AUS	BEL	GER	IRE	NL	NOR	NZ	SWE	UK	Certifications (sales thresholds)
Heartbreaker	Released: September 5, 2000; Label: Bloodshot Records	140	—	93	—	67	—	—	—	—	183	
Gold	Released: September 25, 2001; Label: Lost Highway Records	59	57	—	51	17	60	6	45	9	20	BPI: Gold
Demolition	Released: September 24, 2002; Label: Lost Highway Records	28	54	—	83	19	44	14	49	15	22	
Rock N Roll	Released: November 4, 2003; Label: Lost Highway Records	33	94	—	71	11	81	19	—	29	41	
Love Is Hell	Released: May 4, 2004; Label: Lost Highway Records	—	—	87	—	—	—	14	—	36	68	
Cold Roses (with The Cardinals)	Released: May 3, 2005; Label: Lost Highway Records	26	31	27	39	16	48	9	30	8	20	
Jacksonville City Nights (with The Cardinals)	Released: September 27, 2005; Label: Lost Highway Records	33	66	66	72	43	—	16	40	27	59	
29	Released: December 20, 2005; Label: Lost Highway Records	144	—	—	57	—	73	—	—	—	91	
Easy Tiger	Released: June 26, 2007; Label: Lost Highway Records	7	32	45	63	14	37	5	20	10	18	
Cardinology (with The Cardinals)	Released: October 28, 2008; Label: Lost Highway Records	11	70	54	98	52	72	22	31	41	41	
Orion	Released: May 18, 2010; Label: PAX AM	—	—	—	—	—	—	—	—	—	—	
III/IV (with The Cardinals)	Released: December 14, 2010; Label: PAX AM	59	—	—	—	—	—	—	—	—	—	
Ashes & Fire	Released: October 10, 2011; Label: PAX AM/Capitol Records	7	16	14	34	7	2	14	8	3	9	
Ryan Adams	Release: September 9, 2014; Label: PAX AM/Blue Note Records	4	10	10	30	5	11	7	14	8	6	
1989	Release: September 21, 2015; Label: PAX AM	7	9	9	—	15	21	21	18	38	19	
Prisoner	Release: February 17, 2017; Label: PAX AM/Blue Note Records	8	3	10	16	3	8	7	4	3	3	
Wednesdays	Released: December 11, 2020; Label: PAX AM	—	88	47	13	—	10	—	—	— (Note: Wednesdays did not enter the Sverigetopplistan, but peaked at number four on the Swedish Vinyl Albums chart.)	—	
Big Colors	Release: June 11, 2021; Label: PAX AM	—	—	58	38	—	22	—	—	—	—	
Chris	Release: April 1, 2022; Label: PAX AM	—	—	—	—	—	—	—	—	—	—	
Romeo & Juliet	Release: April 25, 2022; Label: PAX AM	—	—	—	—	—	—	—	—	—	—	
FM	Release: July 22, 2022; Label: PAX AM	—	—	—	—	—	—	—	—	—	—	
Devolver	Release: September 23, 2022; Label: PAX AM	—	—	—	—	—	—	—	—	—	—	
Nebraska	Release: December 7, 2022; Label: PAX AM	—	—	—	—	—	—	—	—	—	—	
Blood on the Tracks	Release: December 26, 2022; Label: PAX AM	—	—	—	—	—	—	—	—	—	—	
Morning Glory	Release: April 14, 2023; Label: PAX AM	—	—	—	—	—	—	—	—	—	—	
Sword & Stone	Release: January 1, 2024; Label: PAX AM	—	—	—	—	—	—	—	—	—	—	
Star Sign	Release: January 1, 2024; Label: PAX AM	—	—	—	—	—	—	—	—	—	—	
Heatwave	Release: January 1, 2024; Label: PAX AM	—	—	—	—	—	—	—	—	—	—	
1985	Release: January 1, 2024; Label: PAX AM	—	—	—	—	—	—	—	—	—	—	
Blackhole	Release: November 15, 2024; Label: PAX AM	—	—	—	—	—	—	—	—	—	—	
Heartbreaker (25th Anniversary Edition)	Release: September 5, 2025; Label: PAX AM	—	—	—	—	—	—	—	—	—	—	
Self Portrait	Release: December 1, 2025; Label: PAX AM	—	—	—	—	—	—	—	—	—	—	
"—" denotes that the album failed to chart

=== Whiskeytown ===
- 1995: Faithless Street
- 1997: Strangers Almanac
- 2001: Pneumonia (recorded 1999)

=== Other albums ===
- 2003: The Finger, We Are Fuck You

== Live albums ==
=== Solo ===
List of solo live albums, with selected chart positions
Title	Album details	Peak chart positions		
Title	Album details	US	BEL	NL
Live at Carnegie Hall (and Ten Songs from Live at Carnegie Hall)	Release: April 21, 2015; Label: PAX AM	125	107	44
Alive, Volume 1 (with The Cardinals)	Release: July 17, 2023; Label: PAX AM	—	—	—
Return to Carnegie Hall	Release: August 25, 2023; Label: PAX AM	—	—	—
Prisoners (Live)	Release: January 1, 2024; Label: PAX AM	—	—	—
Another Wednesday	Release: February 14, 2025; Label: PAX AM	—	—	—
Changes	Release: June 6, 2025; Label: PAX AM	—	—	—
"—" denotes the single failed to chart or not released

== EPs ==
=== Whiskeytown ===
- 1995: Angels
- 1997: Theme for a Trucker
- 1997: Rural Free Delivery
- 1997: In Your Wildest Dreams

=== Solo ===
List of solo EPs, with selected chart positions
Year	EP details	Peak chart positions				
Year	EP details	US	IRE	NOR	SWE	UK
Love Is Hell pt. 1	Released: November 4, 2003; Label: Lost Highway Records	78	21	14	36	62
Love Is Hell pt. 2	Released: December 9, 2003; Label: Lost Highway Records	—	69	—	—	114
The Rescue Blues	Released: January 2004; Label: PAX AM	—	—	—	—	—
Moroccan Role	Released: March 16, 2004; Label: Lost Highway Records	—	—	—	—	—
Follow the Lights / Everybody Knows (with The Cardinals)	Released: October 23, 2007; Label: Lost Highway Records	40	—	—	—	—
Extra Cheese (Valentine's Day EP)	Released: February 10, 2009; Label: Lost Highway Records	—	—	—	—	—
Class Mythology (with The Cardinals)	Released: April 16, 2011; Label: PAX AM	—	—	—	—	—
1984	Released: August 2014; Label: PAX AM	—	—	—	—	—
"—" denotes the single failed to chart or not released

== Singles ==
List of singles, with selected chart positions
Title	Year	Peak chart positions										Album
Title	Year	US Bub.	US Pop	US Adult	US AAA	AUS	BEL	IRE	JPN	NLD	UK	Album
"New York, New York"	2001	12	—	18	1	89	—	—	—	83	53	Gold
"Answering Bell"	2002	—	—	—	13	—	—	49	—	92	39	Gold
"Nuclear"	2002	—	—	—	23	—	—	45	—	—	37	Demolition
"Hey Parker It's Christmas"	2003	—	—	—	—	—	—	—	—	—	—	Non-album single
"This Is It"	2004	—	—	—	—	—	—	—	—	—	—	Rock n Roll
"So Alive"	2004	—	—	—	—	—	—	38	—	97	21	Rock n Roll
"Wonderwall"	2004	—	—	—	—	—	—	—	—	—	27	Love Is Hell
"Let It Ride"	2005	15	78	—	30	—	—	—	—	—	—	Cold Roses
"Easy Plateau"	2005	—	—	—	—	—	—	—	—	—	—	Cold Roses
"Two"	2007	—	—	—	3	—	—	—	—	—	192	Easy Tiger
"Halloweenhead"	2007	—	—	—	—	—	—	—	—	—	192	Easy Tiger
"Everybody Knows"	2007	—	—	—	4	—	—	—	—	—	—	Easy Tiger
"Fix It"	2008	—	—	—	9	—	—	—	—	—	—	Cardinology
"Magick"	2009	—	—	—	9	—	—	—	—	—	—	Cardinology
"Empty Room"	2011	—	—	—	—	—	—	—	—	—	—	Non-album single
"Lucky Now"	2011	—	—	—	1	—	80	—	95	67	—	Ashes & Fire
"Chains of Love"	2011	—	—	—	15	—	96	—	—	—	—	Ashes & Fire
"Gimme Something Good"	2014	—	—	—	2	—	75	—	—	—	—	Ryan Adams
"Stay with Me"	2015	—	—	—	20	—	—	—	—	—	—	Ryan Adams
"Bad Blood"	2015	—	—	—	3	—	25	—	—	—	148	1989
"Do You Still Love Me?"	2016	—	—	—	7	—	58	—	—	—	—	Prisoner
"To Be Without You"	2016	—	—	—	12	—	—	—	—	—	—	Prisoner
"Doomsday"	2016	—	—	—	—	—	—	—	—	—	—	Prisoner
"Baby I Love You"	2018	—	—	—	15	—	—	—	—	—	—	Non-album single
"Fuck the Rain"	2019	—	—	—	20	—	—	—	—	—	—	Big Colors
"—" denotes the single failed to chart or not released

=== Other charted songs ===
Title	Year	Peak chart positions			Album
Title	Year	US Rock	US AAA	BEL	Album
"Burning Photographs"	2004	—	12	—	Rock n Roll
"Kim"	2014	—	—	105	Ryan Adams
"Blank Space"	2015	27	—	—	1989
"Shake It Off"	2015	33	—	—	1989
"Wildest Dreams"	2015	40	—	—	1989
"Style"	2015	41	—	—	1989
"Out of the Woods"	2015	45	—	—	1989
"Welcome to New York"	2015	48	—	—	1989

=== Music videos ===
Year	Video
2001	"New York, New York"
2002	"Answering Bell"
2004	"So Alive"
2007	"Halloweenhead"
2007	"Everybody Knows"
2011	"Chains of Love"
2014	"Gimme Something Good"
2016	"Do You Still Love Me?"
2018	"Baby I Love You"

== Promos ==
- 2002: Answering Bell (Live at the Paradiso) (CD)
- 2003: Hey Parker, It's Christmas (Promo 7")
- 2003: Come Pick Me Up (4-Track version) (Promo 7")
- 2004: Halloween (Promo CD)
- 2004: Now That You're Gone (7")
- 2004: The Rescue Blues (Double 7")
- 2004: California (Double 7")
- 2009: Oblivion (7")
- 2011: Do I Wait/Darkness (7")
- 2011: Empty Room/Nutshell (7")
- 2011: Come Home/Starsign (7")
- 2014: Jacksonville/I Keep Running/Walkedypants (Limited Edition 7")
- 2014: Vampires (7")
- 2014: Do You Laugh When You Lie? (7")
- 2015: No Shadow (7")
- 2015: Blue Light (7")
- 2015: I Do Not Feel Like Being Good (7")
- 2015: Willow Lane/Yes Or Run/Red Hot Blues (7')
- 2015: Burn in the Night/Cop City/Look in the Mirror (7')

== Box sets ==
- 2012: Live After Deaf
- 2015: Live at Carnegie Hall

== Other contributions ==
- 2002: Hear Music Volume 7: Waking (Hear Music) – "When the Stars Go Blue"
- 2002: Rise Above: 24 Black Flag Songs to Benefit the West Memphis Three (Sanctuary Records) – "Nervous Breakdown"
- 2006: The Acoustic Album (Virgin) – "Wonderwall"
- 2012: The Kitty Compilation (compilation cassette) (Burger Records) - Dynasty of Troll Loch Ming
