= Live After Deaf =

Live album by Ryan Adams
- Released: June 18, 2012
- Recorded: June 2011
- Genre: Alternative country
- Label: PAX AM

Ryan Adams chronology
Ashes & Fire (2011)	Live After Deaf (2012)	Ryan Adams (2014)

Live After Deaf is a live box set by American alt-country singer-songwriter Ryan Adams, released on June 18, 2012 on PAX AM. Comprising fifteen vinyl discs, the release chronicles Adams' return to live performances following a two-year hiatus from music. Live After Deaf is a limited edition release.

== Background and recording ==
Live After Deaf's performances are taken from Adams' June 2011, "Acoustic Nightmare" tour. These shows were Adams' first live performances since disbanding his band The Cardinals and retiring from music in 2009. Following the tour's completion, Adams noted, "[It] was the most fun I’ve had ever. I couldn't have imagined it being any better than it was. [...] I just felt really connected and it seemed to me that the people that I was playing for also felt really connected, and it was nice that there wasn’t anything getting in the way of the music."

During the tour, Adams debuted tracks which would subsequently appear on Ashes & Fire (2011).

== Title ==
The album's title is a play-on-words of Iron Maiden's live album Live After Death, and refers to Ryan Adams' struggles with Ménière's disease, which ultimately led him to take an extended respite from live performances in early 2009.

== Release ==
Live After Deaf was originally scheduled for release on June 15, 2012 on Adams' own website. The site, however, crashed and the release was postponed until June 18.

== Track listing ==
Note: The bonus tracks are inserted according to the order of the setlist at the actual concert. Some bonus tracks are available on all digital versions, but others are only available with the digital download that accompanied the original vinyl box set.

Disc One: Live in Cork (June 7th, 2011)
No.	Title	Length
1.	"Dirty Rain"	4:24
2.	"Two"	2:50
3.	"Blue Hotel"	3:47
4.	"Carolina Rain"	5:41
5.	"Crossed-Out Name"	3:06
6.	"Sylvia Plath" (Box Set Only Bonus Track)	4:44
7.	"Dear Chicago"	2:44
8.	"Everybody Knows" (Bonus Track)	3:43
9.	"Damn, Sam (I Love a Woman That Rains)" (Box Set Only Bonus Track)	3:44
10.	"Ashes and Fire"	3:51
11.	"Avenues"	2:48
12.	"Let It Ride" (Bonus Track)	4:16
13.	"Withering Heights"	2:49
14.	"Desire"	3:07
15.	"Please Do Not Let Me Go"	4:23

Disc Two: Live in Dublin (June 8th, 2011)
No.	Title	Length
1.	"Oh My Sweet Carolina"	6:59
2.	"Everybody Knows"	4:16
3.	"Damn, Sam (I Love a Woman That Rains)"	3:45
4.	"If I Am a Stranger" (Box Set Only Bonus Track)	5:52
5.	"New York, New York"	5:15
6.	"In My Time Of Need"	5:45
7.	"Withering Heights" (Box Set Only Bonus Track)	3:03
8.	"Mr. Man" (Improv)	2:25
9.	"Let It Ride" (Box Set Only Bonus Track)	4:41
10.	"Desire" (Box Set Only Bonus Track)	3:25
11.	"Sylvia Plath" (Bonus Track)	5:07
12.	"Firecracker" (Box Set Only Bonus Track)	3:34
13.	"Two" (Box Set Only Bonus Track)	3:12
14.	"Dirty Rain" (Box Set Only Bonus Track)	4:30
15.	"16 Days"	5:06
16.	"Bartering Lines" (Bonus Track)	3:30
17.	"Strawberry Wine"	8:38

Disc Three: Live in Stockholm (June 10th, 2011)
No.	Title	Length
1.	"Oh My Sweet Carolina" (Box Set Only Bonus Track)	5:50
2.	"Firecracker"	3:27
3.	"Damn, Sam (I Love a Woman That Rains)" (Bonus Track)	4:16
4.	"Please Do Not Let Me Go"	4:06
5.	"Everybody Knows" (Box Set Only Bonus Track)	3:50
6.	"Call Me On Your Way Back Home"	4:24
7.	"Desire" (Bonus Track)	3:36
8.	"Invisible Riverside"	5:18
9.	"Dear Chicago"	2:29
10.	"16 Days"	4:16
11.	"Blue Hotel" (Box Set Only Bonus Track)	4:05
12.	"Two"	2:52
13.	"Come Pick Me Up"	6:02
14.	"September"	2:43
15.	"Halloween"	2:53
16.	"Houses on the Hill"	3:46

Disc Four: Live in Oslo (June 11th, 2011)
No.	Title	Length
1.	"Oh My Sweet Carolina"	5:36
2.	"Don't Fail Me Now"	5:50
3.	"Let It Ride"	4:34
4.	"Desire"	3:18
5.	"The Rescue Blues"	3:12
6.	"Blue Hotel" (Box Set Only Bonus Track)	4:49
7.	"Dancing with the Women at the Bar"	5:22
8.	"Please Do Not Let Me Go" (Bonus Track)	4:09
9.	"If I Am a Stranger"	5:26
10.	"Sylvia Plath"	4:31
11.	"Come Pick Me Up" (Box Set Only Bonus Track)	5:42
12.	"Two" (Box Set Only Bonus Track)	3:05
13.	"Friends"	4:43
14.	"This House Is Not for Sale" (Bonus Track)	4:05

Disc Five: Live in Malmo (June 13th, 2011)
No.	Title	Length
1.	"Oh My Sweet Carolina" (Bonus Track)	5:39
2.	"Don't Fail Me Now" (Bonus Track)	5:44
3.	"Firecracker"	3:18
4.	"Damn, Sam (I Love a Woman That Rains)"	3:42
5.	"My Winding Wheel"	3:41
6.	"Let It Ride"	4:14
7.	"Desire"	3:17
8.	"Cannonball Days"	4:24
9.	"Star Sign"	4:53
10.	"Chains of Love"	2:32
11.	"Lucky Now"	3:23
12.	"Come Home"	5:26

Disc Six: Live in Copenhagen (June 14th, 2011)
No.	Title	Length
1.	"Carolina Rain"	5:22
2.	"Invisible Riverside"	5:30
3.	"If I Am a Stranger" (Box Set Only Bonus Track)	5:42
4.	"Jacksonville Skyline"	3:31
5.	"This House Is Not for Sale"	4:04
6.	"Halloween"	4:18
7.	"New York, New York"	4:38
8.	"Dancing with the Women at the Bar" (Bonus Track)	5:20
9.	"Everybody Knows" (Box Set Only Bonus Track)	4:19
10.	"Sweet Illusions"	5:26
11.	"September"	2:31
12.	"Sylvia Plath"	4:55
13.	"Let It Ride" (Box Set Only Bonus Track)	4:28
14.	"Do I Wait"	4:50
15.	"16 Days" (Bonus Track)	4:39

Disc Seven: Live in Lisbon (June 16th, 2011)
No.	Title	Length
1.	"Don't Fail Me Now"	5:36
2.	"Please Do Not Let Me Go" (Bonus Track)	3:52
3.	"If I Am a Stranger"	5:18
4.	"Everybody Knows" (Box Set Only Bonus Track)	3:51
5.	"New York, New York" (Box Set Only Bonus Track)	5:05
6.	"Invisible Riverside"	5:44
7.	"200 More Miles"	5:51
8.	"This House Is Not for Sale"	4:07
9.	"16 Days" (Box Set Only Bonus Track)	5:46
10.	"Do I Wait" (Bonus Track)	5:09
11.	"English Girls Approximately"	5:50
12.	"Strawberry Wine"	8:12
13.	"Desire" (Box Set Only Bonus Track)	3:22
14.	"I Love You But I Don't Know What to Say"	4:24
15.	"Come Home" (Box Set Only Bonus Track)	5:30

Disc Eight: Live in Porto (June 17th, 2011)
No.	Title	Length
1.	"Off Broadway"	4:12
2.	"Everybody Knows" (Bonus Track)	4:49
3.	"Sylvia Plath"	5:06
4.	"Please Do Not Let Me Go" (Box Set Only Bonus Track)	4:07
5.	"Carolina Rain"	5:24
6.	"Firecracker"	3:22
7.	"If I Am a Stranger" (Bonus Track)	5:42
8.	"Mr. Booger Man" (Improv)	1:47
9.	"Damn, Sam (I Love a Woman That Rains)"	4:24
10.	"Sweet Illusions"	5:17
11.	"New York, New York" (Box Set Only Bonus Track)	5:26
12.	"Two"	2:59
13.	"Dancing with the Women at the Bar"	6:06
14.	"Jesus/Cougar" (Improv)	3:38
15.	"Blue Hotel" (Box Set Only Bonus Track)	5:55

Disc Nine: Live in London 1 (June 19th, 2011)
No.	Title	Length
1.	"Oh My Sweet Carolina"	6:40
2.	"Invisible Riverside" (Bonus Track)	5:28
3.	"Why Do They Leave?"	4:09
4.	"New York, New York" (Box Set Only Bonus Track)	5:06
5.	"Let It Ride"	4:25
6.	"Desire" (Box Set Only Bonus Track)	3:21
7.	"Carolina Rain"	5:29
8.	"The Rescue Blues"	3:25
9.	"Dirty Rain" (Bonus Track)	4:07
10.	"In My Time of Need"	4:59
11.	"Bartering Lines"	3:17
12.	"Houses on the Hill" (Box Set Only Bonus Track)	2:50
13.	"Sylvia Plath" (Box Set Only Bonus Track)	4:44
14.	"Dramedy Lighting" (Improv)	2:33
15.	"Come Pick Me Up"	5:44

Disc Ten: Live in London 2 (June 20th, 2011)
No.	Title	Length
1.	"To Be Young (Is to Be Sad, Is to Be High)"	3:33
2.	"Oh My Sweet Carolina" (Box Set Only Bonus Track)	5:35
3.	"Damn, Sam (I Love a Woman That Rains)"	3:41
4.	"Everybody Knows"	4:16
5.	"If I Am a Stranger" (Bonus Track)	5:26
6.	"Firecracker" (Box Set Only Bonus Track)	3:28
7.	"My Winding Wheel"	4:54
8.	"Invisible Riverside"	5:38
9.	"Ashes and Fire"	3:59
10.	"Desire"	3:36
11.	"English Girls Approximately"	5:08
12.	"AMY"	5:05
13.	"16 Days" (Bonus Track)	4:57
14.	"Two" (Box Set Only Bonus Track)	4:29
15.	"Stop"	5:42

Disc Eleven: Live in Brighton (June 22nd, 2011)
No.	Title	Length
1.	"Bartering Lines"	3:22
2.	"Why Do They Leave?"	4:19
3.	"The Rescue Blues"	3:15
4.	"Let It Ride"	5:11
5.	"Everybody Knows"	3:53
6.	"Two" (Box Set Only Bonus Track)	3:34
7.	"Firecracker"	3:17
8.	"Invisible Riverside" (Bonus Track)	5:35
9.	"Jacksonville Skyline"	3:24
10.	"Houses on the Hill"	2:50
11.	"Come Pick Me Up"	5:13
12.	"Sylvia Plath" (Bonus Track)	5:00
13.	"Strawberry Wine"	8:16

Disc Twelve: Live in Manchester (June 23rd, 2011)
No.	Title	Length
1.	"Blue Hotel"	4:40
2.	"If I Am a Stranger" (Bonus Track)	5:46
3.	"Save Me"	4:46
4.	"Carolina Rain"	5:27
5.	"Sweet Lil' Gal (23rd/1st)"	3:52
6.	"Desire"	3:27
7.	"Dirty Rain" (Box Set Only Bonus Track)	4:40
8.	"Two" (Box Set Only Bonus Track)	3:06
9.	"To Be Young (Is to Be Sad, Is to Be High)"	3:20
10.	"This House Is Not for Sale"	4:06
11.	"New York, New York"	5:23
12.	"Firecracker" (Bonus Track)	3:27
13.	"Amy"	3:03
14.	"English Girls Approximately" (Box Set Only Bonus Track)	5:49
15.	"Why Do They Leave?"	7:13

Disc Thirteen: Live in Glasgow (June 25th, 2011)
No.	Title	Length
1.	"Why Do They Leave?" (Box Set Only Bonus Track)	5:21
2.	"Please Do Not Let Me Go"	4:07
3.	"Carolina Rain" (Box Set Only Bonus Track)	5:14
4.	"Blue Hotel" (Box Set Only Bonus Track)	4:24
5.	"New York, New York" (Bonus Track)	5:31
6.	"My Winding Wheel"	3:48
7.	"Sweet Illusions"	5:32
8.	"Everybody Knows" (Box Set Only Bonus Track)	3:41
9.	"To Be Young (Is to Be Sad, Is to Be High)"	3:20
10.	"16 Days"	4:31
11.	"Sylvia Plath"	4:45
12.	"Come Pick Me Up"	5:38
13.	"English Girls Approximately"	5:38
14.	"Dear Chicago" (Bonus Track)	2:38
15.	"Goodnight Bob" (Improv)	4:45

Disc Fourteen: Live in Oxford (June 26th, 2011)
No.	Title	Length
1.	"Why Do They Leave?"	4:28
2.	"Please Do Not Let Me Go" (Bonus Track)	4:06
3.	"Carolina Rain"	5:16
4.	"Sweet Lil' Gal (23rd/1st)"	4:02
5.	"Blue Hotel" (Box Set Only Bonus Track)	4:45
6.	"Everybody Knows"	3:42
7.	"September"	2:33
8.	"My Winding Wheel"	3:31
9.	"New York, New York" (Box Set Only Bonus Track)	5:48
10.	"Two" (Box Set Only Bonus Track)	2:50
11.	"To Be Young (Is to Be Sad, Is to Be High)" (Bonus Track)	3:20
12.	"I See Monsters"	4:29
13.	"Come Pick Me Up"	5:34
14.	"Strawberry Wine"	8:01

Disc Fifteen: Live in Amsterdam (June 28th, 2011)
No.	Title	Length
1.	"Oh My Sweet Carolina"	5:40
2.	"Blue Hotel" (Bonus Track)	4:40
3.	"If I Am a Stranger" (Bonus Track)	5:10
4.	"To Be Young (Is to Be Sad, Is to Be High)"	3:17
5.	"Carolina Rain"	5:04
6.	"Firecracker"	3:17
7.	"Let It Ride"	4:31
8.	"Bartering Lines"	3:25
9.	"New York, New York"	4:57
10.	"I See Monsters"	4:33
11.	"Two"	2:45
12.	"Stop"	5:22
