= Empty Room =

Empty Room may refer to:

- "Empty Room", a song on the album The Suburbs by Canadian band Arcade Fire
- "Empty Room" (Sanna Nielsen song), a song by Swedish recording artist Sanna Nielsen
- Empty Room, an album by Swedish recording artist Magnus Rosén
- Empty Room, an album by American composer Zack Hemsey
- Empty Room, an album by American saxophonist Sal Nistico
- Empty Room / Nutshell, 2011 Brian Adams double single

== See also ==
- Empty Rooms, 1970 studio album by John Mayall
- "Empty Rooms", Gary Moore single from the album Victims of the Future
