= 1984 (EP) =

EP by Ryan Adams
- Released: August 2014
- Studio: PAX AM Studios, Los Angeles
- Genre: Hardcore punk, punk rock
- Label: PAX AM
- Producer: Ryan Adams

Ryan Adams chronology
Ashes & Fire (2011)	1984 (2014)	Ryan Adams (2014)

1984 is an EP by American singer-songwriter Ryan Adams, released in August 2014 on PAX AM. Initially the second release in Adams' "PAX AM Single Series", the EP was released digitally on August 28, 2014.

Recorded entirely by Adams, 1984 is described as "pay[ing] homage to the halcyon days of the earliest releases from [record labels] Dischord, SST, Touch & Go and their ilk."

== Background ==
The EP's sound was influenced by the various hardcore artists Ryan Adams grew up listening to. He noted, "The kind of music that I first started playing was that kind of music, but it's not really any different to my regular stuff." Regarding its overall aesthetic, Adams stated: "It’s my Hüsker Dü kind of vibe."

== Recording ==
1984 was recorded at Adams' studio, with Adams performing each instrument. The EP was engineered by his current bandmate Charlie Stavish.

== Release ==
The EP is the second of Adams' "PAX AM Single Series", with a new seven-inch release planned for each month. (The first was the Gimme Something Good single, with the B-Side of Aching For More.) Adams stated, "I'm going to release a single every month until I can't do it any more." Regarding 1984 specifically, he noted, "People just have to hear it, the American vinyl is now sold out and we're going to make the digital available at some point, probably after my album comes out."

The digital version of the album includes an additional track, entitled "Look in the Mirror".

== Track listing ==
All tracks are written by Ryan Adams.

Side one
No.	Title	Length
1.	"When the Summer Ends"	1:10
2.	"What If You Were Wrong"	1:28
3.	"Over and Over"	0:37
4.	"Change Your Mind"	1:29
5.	"Broken Eyes"	1:14

Side two
No.	Title	Length
1.	"Why Did They Leave You Alone"	1:12
2.	"Rats in the Wall"	1:21
3.	"Bones and Ash"	1:10
4.	"Wolves"	1:43
5.	"Push It Away"	1:18

Digital Bonus Track
No.	Title	Length
11.	"Look in the Mirror"	1:56

== Personnel ==
=== Musicians ===
- Ryan Adams – all instruments
- Marshall Vore – "confused screaming"

=== Production ===
- Ryan Adams – producer
- Charlie Stavish – engineer, mixing

=== Artwork ===
- Johnny T – cover photograph
- Ryan Adams – back cover photograph
- Alan Crawford – inside sleeve photograph
- Andy West – design
