= Now That You're Gone =

Now That You're Gone may refer to:

- "Now That You're Gone", a single from the album Diana by Diana Ross
- "Now That You're Gone", a single by Shiri Maimon
- "Now That You're Gone" (Sheryl Crow song)
- "Now That You're Gone" (Corina song)
- "Now That You've Gone" (Mike & The Mechanics song)
- "Now That You're Gone", a song from the album Throne to the Wolves by From First to Last
- "Now That You're Gone", a single by Tanya Lacey
- "Now That You're Gone", a song from the album Young & Restless by Kristinia DeBarge
- "Now that You're Gone", a song by Ryan Adams
- "Now That You're Gone", a song by Smilez & Southstar
- "Now That You're Gone", a single by Joe Cocker
- "Now That You're Gone", from the album Martha Wash by Martha Wash
- "Now That You're Gone", a song from the album Things We Do by Indigenous
- "Now That You're Gone", a song from the album Is It Friday Yet? by Gord Bamford
- "Now That You're Gone", a song from the album Help Us Stranger by The Raconteurs
- "Now That You're Gone", a song by Sharon Cuneta which was revived by Juris Fernandez for the film No Other Woman
