= Stop (Ryan Adams song) =

Song by Ryan Adams and The Cardinals

from the album Cardinology
- Released: 28 October 2008
- Genre: Rock, Alternative Country
- Label: Lost Highway Records
- Songwriter(s): David Ryan Adams
- Producer(s): Tom Schick

"Stop" is a song by Ryan Adams and The Cardinals from their album Cardinology. The track closes the album (excluding bonus tracks) and is concerned with the topic of substance abuse.

"Stop" is the only slow song on Cardinology and was featured on A&E's The Cleaner on September 30, 2008.

== Personnel ==
- Ryan Adams — Vocals and piano
- Neal Casal — Background vocals
- Chris Feinstein — Bass
- Jon Graboff — Pedal steel guitar
- Brad Pemberton — Drums
- Michael Panes — Violin
