= Live at Carnegie Hall (Ryan Adams album) =

Live album by Ryan Adams
- Released: April 21, 2015
- Recorded: November 15 and 17, 2014
- Venue: Carnegie Hall (New York City, NY)
- Length: 3:36:00
- Label: PAX AM

Live at Carnegie Hall is a live album by Ryan Adams, released on April 21, 2015.

== Track listing ==
Disc 1

1. "Gimme Something Good" (Ryan Adams)
2. "Oh My Sweet Carolina" (Adams)
3. "Damn, Sam (I Love a Woman That Rains)" (Adams)
4. "My Winding Wheel" (Adams)
5. "Trouble" (Adams)
6. "Nobody Girl" (Adams, Ethan Johns)
7. "Off Broadway" (Adams, Brad Pemberton)
8. "Halloween" (Adams)
9. "New York, New York" (Adams)
10. "Please Do Not Let Me Go" (Adams)
11. "Rats in the Wall" (Adams)
12. "Why Do They Leave?" (Adams)
13. "Sylvia Plath" (Adams, Richard Causon)
14. "Crossed Out Name" (Adams)
15. "This Is Where We Meet in My Mind" (Adams)
16. "If I Am a Stranger" (Adams)
17. "Amy" (Adams)
18. "English Girls Approximately" (Adams)
19. "Avenues" (Adams)
20. "Come Pick Me Up" (Adams, Alston Williams)

Disc 2

1. "Oh My Sweet Carolina" (Adams)
2. "My Winding Wheel" (Adams)
3. "Dirty Rain" (Adams)
4. "My Wrecking Ball" (Adams)
5. "New York, New York" (Adams)
6. "Friends" (Adams)
7. "Am I Safe" (Adams)
8. "Ashes & Fire" (Adams)
9. "Gimme Something Good" (Adams)
10. "Why Do They Leave?" (Adams)
11. "Off Broadway" (Adams, Brad Pemberton)
12. "The Hardest Part" (Adams, J.P. Bowersock, Jon Graboff, Pemberton, Catherine Popper)
13. "The Rescue Blues" (Adams)
14. "Lucky Now" (Adams)
15. "Dear Chicago" (Adams)
16. "Desire" (Adams)
17. "How Much Light" (Adams)
18. "Firecracker" (Adams)
19. "Kim" (Adams)
20. "Call Me on Your Way Back Home" (Adams)
21. "Black Sheets of Rain" (Bob Mould
22. "Come Pick Me Up" (Adams, Alston Williams)

Track listing adapted from AllMusic.
