= Krista Polvere =

- Born: Krista Ann Polvere
- Origin: Melbourne, Australia
- Genres: Alternative country, folk, rock
- Occupations: Musician, singer-songwriter
- Instruments: Vocals, guitar
- Years active: 10

Krista Polvere is an Australian-born singer/songwriter from Adelaide, but resides in Melbourne, Australia. Polvere moved to Sydney at a young age to study acting and music. Polvere's father, a former band manager, immigrated from Naples, Italy and her mother is of Welsh descent.

Playing shows around the small bars and clubs in Adelaide, Polvere moved to Melbourne for its live music culture. Polvere ventured to New York City for an adventure, traveling to the heart of where the folk scene began. Polvere is noted to be a huge Dylan fan and was mesmerized by the history of the music scene in NYC. Soon after getting to NYC, Polvere was introduced to Jon Graboff of The Cardinals, which led to her meeting with Ryan Adams, with whom she co-wrote tracks for her debut album Here Be Dragons.

Recording Here Be Dragons in Kingston, New York with Grammy Award-winning producer Malcolm Burn, Polvere had Ryan Adams play guitar and piano on her album and Grasshopper from Mercury Rev appear on the recording. Directly after finishing the recording process, Polvere moved back to Australia. Critically acclaimed Here Be Dragons was released in Australia through independent Sydney-based label Inertia. Polvere has been compared to musicians Nick Drake and Mazzy Star. Krista Polvere has also worked with well-known Australian artists Mark Lizotte (aka Diesel) and Monique Brumby.

Polvere accompanied Ryan Adams and The Cardinals on their national Australian tour to sell out shows. Polvere also opened for Canadian folk man Ron Sexsmith on a national tour and she toured with Steve Earle playing to sell out crowds.

Through an introduction from a good friend Polvere started talking ideas for her second record with Marc Ford (The Black Crowes) and his long-time friend and music collaborator Anthony Arvizu.

Marc and Anthony have co-produced two of Ryan Bingham's records and Marc, of course is world-renowned for his outstanding guitar playing and style. From these discussions it became clear that this would be the right match. Marc's purist approach meant that the album was recorded live in their Long Beach Californian studio, The Compound.

Working within a tight time frame of 3 weeks for recording and mixing of 13 tracks, meant that everyone worked hard and intuitively. Ryan Adams played guitar and sang backing vocals.

This album showcases Polvere's song writing ability and voice. Ryan Adams was most recently quoted in an interview with Melbourne's Herald Sun as saying: “She is going to be the next big thing, I just recorded some music with her for her new record in California," he says. "I did some guitar and some vocals and I would say this: I have always been impressed by her. She's always impressed me as a songwriter and a friend. But the songs I've heard this time, I can honestly say I had no idea that she was capable of what I heard."I don't say that to undermine her – I was shocked at how intricate it was. From what I've heard it's such a powerful record. It's going to be a real game-changer."

Polvere released her second album 'Reservoir Drive' in 2013.

After the release of that album she spent more time in America recording a third album with producer Brian Elijah Smith, which is due to be released in 2016. The first single from the album Shut Up and Ride was released on November 27. The recordings were made over an intense period in a basement studio fuelled by an intense relationship between the pair resulting in an album of rare emotional vulnerability and fire.

“There is a story within it all that makes this album even more intense and special. You may hear it all coming through the songs, through my voice. The producer and instrumentalist on the album was my lover at the time. When I listen to the record now I can hear the ghosts of our love and the listener may too”, said Polvere of the album.

Prior to the release of the single Polvere commenced a short residency at Melbourne’s Gasometer Hotel along with a series of other shows around Victoria and a three-day stint at Australian Music Week in Sydney.

== Sources ==
- "Krista Polvere". Facebook.
- "Krista Polvere Fan Club". Facebook.
- Kelton, Sam (3 November 2011). "Ryan Adams sifts through ashes". Herald Sun; National Features. Victoria (Australia).
- lkatulka (1 September 2007). "Krista Polvere Turns Heads". Crushable. Archived from the original on 22 July 2012.
- "Krista Polvere". Inertia Music. Archived from the original on 28 May 2008.
- "Search results for Krista Polvere". FasterLouder Pty Ltd. Archived from the original on 7 March 2012.
- Walker, Jo (27 May 2008). "KRISTA POLVERE". frankie magazine online. FRANKIE PRESS. Archived from the original on 6 July 2011.
- Tracey, Liam (29 May 2008). "Krista Polvere, Rushcutter @ The Toff in Town, Melbourne (28/05/2008)". FasterLouder Pty Ltd.
- Donovan, Patrick; Murfett, Andrew (23 May 2008). "Bon Voyage to Freo". The Age (theage.com.au). p. 3.
- Dib, Lisa (24 July 2008). "Krista Polvere Melbourne shows". TheDwarf.com.au.
- Alexander, Mitch (19 November 2008). "Steve Earle / Allison Moorer / Krista Polvere". Rave Magazine. Brisbane Street Press.
- "Adelaide's home for Krista". AdelaideNow. 22 August 2007.
- "Krista Polvere".
- Thrower, Matt (21 May 2008). "KRISTA POLVERE – Here Be Dragons". Rave Magazine. Brisbane Street Press. Archived from the original on 22 August 2008.
