= Lucky Now =

2011 single by Ryan Adams

Single by Ryan Adams

from the album Ashes & Fire
- Released: August 2011
- Genre: Adult alternative
- Label: PAX AM, Capitol Records
- Songwriter: Ryan Adams
- Producer: Glyn Johns

Ryan Adams singles chronology
"Empty Room" / "Nutshell" (2011)	"Lucky Now" (2011)	"Chains of Love" (2011)

"Lucky Now" is a song by alt country singer-songwriter Ryan Adams, and the lead single from his thirteenth studio album, Ashes & Fire. According to Adams, the single is based upon "my time in New York in my twenties".

== Background and composition ==
According to Adams, an early version of the song was about Cardinals bassist Chris Feinstein, who died in December 2009. In August 2011, Adams stated:

It was a difficult song to write. The first version was called "Chris". I was trying to write a song for my friend and former bandmate who passed away. The song I wrote was too direct, and I realised that there needed to be more self-reflection. I needed to make this feeling relatable to others, so that it could be relatable back to myself. In some strange way, it needed to be more altruistic, by being more first-person. It's a very strange concept, but when I listen to songs, I need to feel the narrator's shoes rubbing against my feet, you know? I needed to put myself in that place."

Adams elaborated further, "It's the second draft of the song that I wrote for Chris Feinstien. [...] I think it was really fantastic, it was a good thing for me to write. Eventually, because I sat around with it, "Lucky Now" came around."

== Musicians ==
- Drums: Jeremy Stacey
- Bass: Gus Seyffert
- Piano: Norah Jones
- B3 Hammond: Benmont Tench
- Guitars: Ryan Adams

== Charts ==
Chart (2011–12)	Peak position
Netherlands (Dutch Single Top 100)	67
US Adult Alternative Airplay (Billboard)	1
US Hot Rock & Alternative Songs (Billboard)	38
