= Pornography (band) =

American punk rock band, 2013–2014

- Origin: New York City, New York, United States
- Genre: Punk rock
- Years active: 2013–2014
- Label: PAX AM
- Past members: Ryan Adams; Leah Hennessey; Johnny T. Yerington

Pornography was an American punk rock band, from New York, featuring Make Out vocalist Leah Hennessey, singer-songwriter Ryan Adams and drummer Johnny T. Yerington. They disbanded in 2014. The band released its debut EP, 7 Minutes in Heaven, on April 21, 2013, on Adams' label, PAX AM.

== History ==
According to vocalist Leah Hennessey, the band's originated from a conversation between herself and Adams: "I told Ryan I wanted to make sad bastard music and the next day he asked me to come sing in his and Johnny's punk band, which is when we wrote and recorded the entirety of 7 Minutes in Heaven. We never give ourselves more than a few minutes to write the songs so we can't really afford to censor ourselves or be less stupid."

The band is predominantly based in New York City with Hennessey stating, "Johnny [T. Yerington] is here and [producer] Gus [Oberg] is here, and Ryan [Adams] is in L.A., and he just comes here to do stuff with us. Percentage-wise, the band is based in New York, and that's where we record everything. And we have a lot of material recorded, too -- [7 Minutes in Heaven] is just the tip, this is like a million years ago, to me. That blip when we first met."

The band released its debut EP, 7 Minutes in Heaven, on April 21, 2013. Produced by Gus Oberg, the EP was released in celebration of Record Store Day. They disbanded in 2014.

== Discography ==
- 7 Minutes in Heaven (2013)

== Line-up ==
- Leah Hennessey - vocals
- Ryan Adams - guitar, bass guitar
- Johnny T. Yerington - drums

Live members

- Gus Oberg - bass guitar (future live performances)
