= Class Mythology =

EP by Ryan Adams and the Cardinals
- Released: April 16, 2011
- Recorded: Electric Lady Studios, New York City
- Genre: Alternative country
- Label: PAX AM
- Producer: Tom Schick

Ryan Adams chronology
III/IV (2010)	Class Mythology (2011)	Ashes & Fire (2011)

Class Mythology is an EP by American alt-country band Ryan Adams and the Cardinals, released on April 16, 2011 on PAX AM. Limited to 2500 copies, the EP was released in celebration of Record Store Day, and consists of unreleased tracks recorded for Cardinology (2008).

The release comprises two coloured seven-inch singles, a small poster of deceased bassist Chris Feinstein, and a sticker.

== Track listing ==
All songs written by David Ryan Adams

1. "Go Ahead and Rain"
2. "Invisible Red"
3. "Your Name Is on Fire"
4. "Future Sparrow"

== Personnel ==
Ryan Adams & the Cardinals

- Ryan Adams – vocals, guitar, collage art
- Neal Casal – guitar, vocals, photographs
- Chris Feinstein – bass guitar
- Jon Graboff – pedal steel guitar, acoustic guitar
- Brad Pemberton – drums

Technical personnel

- Tom Schick – producer, mixing
- Andy West – package design
