= Empty Room / Nutshell =

"Empty Room" / "Nutshell"

Single by Ryan Adams
- Released: June 2011
- Recorded: "Empty Room" - Perfect Sound, Hollywood, California "Nutshell" - Kyle's Old Room Studios
- Genre: Alternative country
- Label: PAX AM
- Producer(s): Jamie Candiloro ("Empty Room"); Ryan Adams ("Empty Room" & "Nutshell")

Ryan Adams singles chronology
| "Fix It" (2008) | "Empty Room" / "Nutshell" (2011) | "Lucky Now" (2011) |

"Empty Room" / "Nutshell" is a limited edition double a-side single by the American singer-songwriter Ryan Adams, released in June 2011 on PAX AM. The single was available to purchase during Adams' June 2011 European tour, and is only available on 7" vinyl.

The track "Nutshell" is an Alice in Chains cover song, and marks the second time Adams has recorded and released an Alice in Chains song, with "Down in a Hole" appearing on the EP, Follow the Lights, in 2007.

== Track listing ==
Side A

"Empty Room"

Side B

"Nutshell"

== Personnel ==
=== Musicians ===
- Ryan Adams - lead vocals, acoustic and electric guitar
- Sebastian Steinberg - bass guitar ("Empty Room")
- Chris Stills - acoustic guitar and backing vocals ("Empty Room")
- Rami Jaffee - piano and organ ("Empty Room")
- Marty Rifkin - pedal steel ("Empty Room")
- Marshall Vore - drums ("Empty Room")
- Mandy Moore - backing vocals ("Empty Room")

=== Recording personnel ===
- Jamie Candiloro - producer ("Empty Room")
- Ryan Adams - producer ("Empty Room" and "Nutshell"), recording and engineering ("Nutshell")
- Jason Donaghy - assistant engineer ("Empty Room")
- John Gilbertson - recording and engineering ("Nutshell")

=== Artwork ===
- Ryan Adams - photographs
- Andy West - design
