= Prisoner (Ryan Adams album) =

Studio album by Ryan Adams
- Released: February 17, 2017
- Recorded: 2016
- Genres: Rock; indie rock; heartland rock
- Length: 42:52
- Label: PAX AM/Blue Note
- Producer: Ryan Adams

Ryan Adams chronology
1989 (2015)	Prisoner (2017)	Wednesdays (2020)

Singles from Prisoner
- 1. "Do You Still Love Me?" Released: December 7, 2016; 2. "To Be Without You" Released: December 23, 2016; 3. "Doomsday" Released: January 19, 2017

Prisoner is the sixteenth studio album by American singer-songwriter Ryan Adams. It was released on February 17, 2017. The album is Adams' first album of original material since his 2014 album, Ryan Adams, and was preceded by the singles "Do You Still Love Me?", "To Be Without You", and "Doomsday".

== Critical reception ==
Professional ratings
Aggregate scores
Source	Rating
AnyDecentMusic?	6.6/10
Metacritic	79/100
Review scores
Source	Rating
AllMusic	4/5 stars
Consequence of Sound	A
Mojo	3/5 stars
Pitchfork	(6.2/10)
Slant Magazine	4/5 stars
Uncut	4/5 stars

Prisoner received generally positive reviews from music critics. At Metacritic, which assigns a normalized rating out of 100 to reviews from mainstream critics, the album has an average score of 79 based on 30 reviews, indicating "generally favorable reviews".

Stephen Thomas Erlewine of AllMusic rated the album four out of five stars, calling it "charming", and said that "it's not a record that wallows in hurt, it's an album that functions as balm for bad times." Writing for Slant Magazine, Jeremy Winograd rated the album four of five stars and said that Prisoner is "one of Adams's most sonically artful albums to date."

=== Accolades ===
Publication	Rank	List
Billboard	N/A	27 Best Albums of 2017 So Far
Consequence of Sound	1	25 Best Albums of 2017 So Far
NME	N/A	20 Best Albums of 2017 So Far
Paste	13	20 Best Albums of 2017 So Far
Uproxx	10	50 Best Albums of 2017 So Far

== Commercial performance ==
Prisoner debuted at number eight on the US Billboard 200 with 45,000 album-equivalent units, 42,000 of which were pure album sales.

== Track listing ==
All tracks are written by Ryan Adams, except where noted. All tracks were produced by Adams.

Prisoner
No.	Title	Writer(s)	Length
1.	"Do You Still Love Me?"	Ryan Adams, Daniel Clarke	4:00
2.	"Prisoner"	Adams, Mike Viola	3:12
3.	"Doomsday"		3:02
4.	"Haunted House"		2:42
5.	"Shiver and Shake"		3:05
6.	"To Be Without You"		3:22
7.	"Anything I Say to You Now"		4:51
8.	"Breakdown"		4:01
9.	"Outbound Train"		4:21
10.	"Broken Anyway"		2:57
11.	"Tightrope"		3:57
12.	"We Disappear"		3:30
Total length:			42:52

Prisoner (B-Sides)
No.	Title	Length
1.	"Where Will You Run?"	2:33
2.	"Juli"	3:53
3.	"Are You Home?"	3:57
4.	"No Words"	2:54
5.	"Halo"	3:00
6.	"It Will Never Be The Same"	4:03
7.	"What If We're Wrong"	3:10
8.	"Broken Things"	3:38
9.	"Stop You"	3:26
10.	"Hanging On to Hope"	2:35
11.	"Let It Burn"	3:14
12.	"Crazy Now"	3:35
13.	"You Said"	3:45
14.	"Please Help Me"	3:45
15.	"Too Tired to Cry"	6:53
16.	"Stop Talking"	3:38
17.	"The Empty Bed"	3:53
18.	"The Cold ('End of the World Edition' Bonus Track)"	2:58
19.	"Lookout ('End of the World Edition' Bonus Track)"	2:51
Total length:		67:40

== Personnel ==
Credits adapted from AllMusic.

- Ryan Adams – guitar, bass guitar, lead vocals, synthesizer, piano, harmonica, cover painting, photography, producer
- Johnny T. Yerington – drums, percussion, photography
- Charlie Stavish – bass guitar (1, 11, 12), engineer, mixing
- Mike Viola – guitar (1)
- Daniel Clarke – organ (1)
- Jason Boesel – drums (1)
- Joe Sublett – saxophone (11)

Technical

- Noah Abrams – photography
- Beatriz Artola – engineer, mixing
- Reuben Cohen – mastering
- Rachel Jones – assistant engineer
- Phil Joy – engineer
- Lee Foster – assistant engineer
- Gavin Lurssen – mastering
- Scott Newton – photography
- Andy West – design

== Charts ==
=== Weekly charts ===
Chart (2017)	Peak position
Australian Albums (ARIA)	3
Austrian Albums (Ö3 Austria)	23
Belgian Albums (Ultratop Flanders)	10
Belgian Albums (Ultratop Wallonia)	163
Canadian Albums (Billboard)	9
Danish Albums (Hitlisten)	37
Dutch Albums (Album Top 100)	8
Finnish Albums (Suomen virallinen lista)	33
German Albums (Offizielle Top 100)	16
Irish Albums (IRMA)	3
Italian Albums (FIMI)	49
New Zealand Albums (RMNZ)	4
Norwegian Albums (VG-lista)	7
Scottish Albums (Official Charts)	3
Spanish Albums (PROMUSICAE)	33
Swedish Albums (Sverigetopplistan)	3
Swiss Albums (Schweizer Hitparade)	19
UK Albums (Official Charts)	3
US Billboard 200	8
US Top Rock Albums (Billboard)	1

=== Year-end charts ===
Chart (2017)	Position
Belgian Albums (Ultratop Flanders)	143
US Top Rock Albums (Billboard)	72

== Release history ==
Region	Date	Format(s)	Label	Ref.
United States	February 17, 2017	CD; DL; LP	PAX AM/Blue Note	
