= Ashes & Fire =

2011 studio album by Ryan Adams

Studio album by Ryan Adams
- Released: October 10, 2011
- Recorded: Sunset Sound (Hollywood, California)
- Genre: Alternative country
- Length: 42:42
- Labels: PAX AM, Capitol
- Producer: Glyn Johns

Ryan Adams chronology
III/IV (2010)	Ashes & Fire (2011)	Ryan Adams (2014)

Singles from Ashes & Fire
- 1. "Lucky Now" Released: August 2011; 2. "Chains of Love" Released: 2011

Ashes & Fire is the thirteenth studio album by Ryan Adams, released on October 10, 2011 in the UK and the next day in the US, by PAX AM and Capitol Records. Recorded with producer Glyn Johns, Ashes & Fire marks Adams' return to recording following the disbandment of his band the Cardinals in 2009. Regarding the album, Adams noted, "The record is obsessed with time. I believe that there is a kinder view of the self. I'm passing through my own life as a ghost, and looking at these pieces and places in my life. I'm looking at California, and the idea of being lost and found at the same time."

On October 16, 2011, the album entered the UK Albums Chart at number 9, making his best position in the United Kingdom. In the United States, it debuted at number 7, making Ashes & Fire his second top 10 album since Easy Tiger.

The album was preceded by the single "Lucky Now", Adams' first release with Capitol Records.

== Background ==
In January 2009, while touring in support of Cardinology (2008), Adams announced that he was planning to retire from music, due to ongoing problems with Ménière's disease. Posting on his website, Adams wrote: "I am excited to finish this wonderful time I have had with the Cardinals. [...] I am grateful for the time we have had, and maybe someday we will have more stories to tell together. I am, however, ready for quieter times, as I think it is very evident I am struggling with some balance and hearing issues. [...] Maybe we will play again sometime, and maybe I will work my way back into some kind of music situation, but this is the time for me to step back now, to reel it in." At this time, Adams had written a planned studio album, entitled Dear Impossible, which was subsequently abandoned.

The band played their final show on March 20, 2009, at the Fox Theatre in Atlanta and dissolved. Drummer Brad Pemberton noted, "Everyone was a bit fried, so it was the right time to step back for a minute. I encouraged Ryan to go and get married, and have a life and find some peace; the guy hasn’t really slowed down in ten years, and he needed it as much as we did." On December 15, 2009, Cardinals bassist Chris Feinstein was found dead in his New York City apartment.

During his hiatus from music, Adams married singer and actress Mandy Moore and relocated from New York City to Los Angeles. Adams released two books of poetry, Infinity Blues and Hello Sunshine, and, in late 2009, began issuing unreleased recordings through his label, PAX AM. Two studio albums, Orion and III/IV, an EP, Class Mythology, and various singles, were released between 2009 and 2010. Regarding his struggles with Ménière's disease, during this time, Adams noted, "It took me a little bit of time to get it under control and get my life under control. I was very, very sick. I was very ill. I had screaming loud noises in my left ear from the tinnitus, and I just felt sick all the time."

In October 2010, Adams began making sporadic live performances around Los Angeles, and subsequently embarked upon a European tour in June 2011, performing new songs alongside older material. Regarding the tour, Adams noted, "[It] was the most fun I’ve had ever. I couldn't have imagined it being any better than it was. [...] I just felt really connected and it seemed to me that the people that I was playing for also felt really connected, and it was nice that there wasn’t anything getting in the way of the music." Following the tour's completion, Adams announced that a new studio album, produced by Glyn Johns, father of Ethan Johns (Heartbreaker, Gold and 29) was scheduled for release in October 2011.

== Writing and composition ==
Regarding the album's title track, Adams noted, "I thought it was implying the reference of a phoenix in a song." Adams ultimately decided to name the album after the song, stating, "I wanted it to sound hot, as in temperature-wise, windows-rolled-down, middle-of-summer, driving-through-California, hot. In all honesty, it was the right title. [...] I was trying to paint this picture of somebody not destroyed by change. I got the idea from the arcade game, Phoenix." Adams does not refer to his struggles with Ménière's disease on the album, noting, "[It] is a personal thing, and I decided it didn't have to have anything to do with my creative life, it didn't need to be a record about recovery."

According to Adams, Laura Marling's second studio album, I Speak Because I Can, inspired him to re-write the majority of the album's material. After receiving a copy from former producer Ethan Johns, Adams noted, "I thought: 'For fuck's sake.' I literally threw out 80% of what I had. And it felt good, to ask: 'What am I really capable of?' I felt competitive again to write great songs."

== Recording ==
Ashes & Fire was recorded at Sunset Sound Studios in Hollywood California, using analog equipment. Amongst the album's contributors are Norah Jones, Benmont Tench, and former Cardinals guitarist Neal Casal. Casal later commented on working with Adams again, noting, "He’s in fine form. I will always have a connection with him. It doesn’t go away just because you don’t play in the same band anymore."

== Reception ==
Professional ratings
Aggregate scores
Source	Rating
AnyDecentMusic?	7.2/10
Metacritic	76/100
Review scores
Source	Rating
AllMusic	3.5/5 stars
The A.V. Club	B
The Daily Telegraph	5/5 stars
Entertainment Weekly	B+
The Guardian	4/5 stars
Los Angeles Times	4/4 stars
NME	8/10
Pitchfork	6.5/10
Rolling Stone	3.5/5 stars
Spin	7/10

So far the album holds a score of 76 out of 100 from Metacritic based on 38 "generally favorable reviews".

Most of the reviews were positive. IGN gave the album a perfect score of ten out of ten and said, "Adams' latest is the focused masterpiece fans have been waiting for, holding your undivided attention with an enchanting set of acoustic-based treasures that rival anything the songsmith has ever crafted." The Phoenix gave it a score of three-and-a-half stars out of four and called it "as close as it gets to the brilliance of his first post-Whiskeytown offering, Heartbreaker." Paste gave it a score of 8.2 out of ten and called it "pretty damn good".

Uncut gave it four stars out of five and called it "an understated gem". The Boston Globe gave it a favorable review and called it a "lovely, low-key effort". NME gave it a score of eight out of ten and called it "an album worth celebrating now." The Quietus also gave it a favorable review and said it has "a softer collection of songs, harnessing more sincerity than his last two general-release LPs (as opposed to Orion, which was online-only), Easy Tiger and Cardinology." Clash also gave it a score of eight out of ten and called it "a haunting album that truly reveals Adams' bruised soul." musicOMH also gave it a score of four stars out of five and said "It may put people off who were more attracted to Adams' more tortured side, but Ashes & Fire makes for a compelling reboot for a man who could, once more, become a contender." Alternative Press gave it a similar score of four stars out of five and said, "The recordings have the warmth and pop of a vinyl record, creating a perfect environment for Adams to honor his influences." Consequence of Sound also gave it a score of four out of five and said it "remains compelling throughout thanks to its peaks and valleys." BBC Music also gave it a favorable review and called it "an album that delivers more and more with every listen, showcasing an artist maturing with grace and poise."

Beats Per Minute gave it a score of 79% and said, "Ryan Adams has delivered the goods right now and he appears to be more focused and in a better creative space than he has at any other point in his career." The A.V. Club gave it a B and said it was "everything Ryan Adams records usually aren't: uniform in sound and mood, emotionally centered, and straight-arrow consistent, sometimes to its detriment." Spin gave it a score of seven out of ten and said that Adams is "purely elegant throughout".

Other reviews are average or mixed, however: Sputnikmusic gave it a score of three out of five and said, "For an album heavily predicated on Adams' historically hit-or-miss songwriting, Ashes & Fire is surprisingly steady." Under the Radar gave it a score of six stars out of ten and called it "a delightful Saturday-morning House-cleaning music." The Observer gave it a score of three stars out of five and said, "It hasn't the shiver factor of his debut but there's pleasure in such smooth, elegantly crafted songs after his recent strainings." Drowned in Sound also gave it a score of six out of ten and said, "While it might not be a consistent classic like Heartbreaker or Gold, there's flashes of those earlier triumphs from Adams' career on Ashes & Fire." Now gave it a score of three out of five and called it "a typical Ryan Adams release." American Songwriter also gave it a score of three out of five stars and called it "a solid, not spectacular album with a few very fine songs." Blurt gave it a score of five stars out of ten and said, "Despite the obvious care for craftsmanship, no standouts emerge." Tiny Mix Tapes gave it a score of two stars out of five and said, "Its total lack of affectation is the album's biggest problem. It feels like it's sequenced to fit some expectation of what types of songs an album should have."

== Track listing ==
All tracks are written by Ryan Adams.

No.	Title	Length
1.	"Dirty Rain"	4:19
2.	"Ashes & Fire"	3:45
3.	"Come Home"	4:50
4.	"Rocks"	2:58
5.	"Do I Wait"	3:53
6.	"Chains of Love"	2:23
7.	"Invisible Riverside"	4:44
8.	"Save Me"	4:18
9.	"Kindness"	4:30
10.	"Lucky Now"	2:52
11.	"I Love You But I Don't Know What to Say"	4:10

Japanese Edition (SICP-3322)

No.	Title	Length
12.	"Dirty Rain (In Studio Acoustic Version)"	3:39
13.	"I Love You But I Don't Know What to Say (In Studio Acoustic Version)"	3:32

=== Bonus tracks ===
- "Petal in a Rainstorm" (bonus flexidisc with pre-orders from PAX-AM)
- "Darkness" (bonus download with pre-orders from PAX-AM)
- "Star Sign" (iTunes bonus)
- "Till I Found You" (iTunes pre-order bonus)

== Personnel ==
=== Musicians ===
Primary musicians

- Ryan Adams – vocals, guitars
- Jeremy Stacey – drums

Additional musicians

- Norah Jones – piano on "Dirty Rain", "Come Home", "Chains of Love", "Save Me", "Kindness", "Lucky Now", "I Love You", backing vocals on "Come Home", "Save Me", "Kindness"
- Benmont Tench – B3 Hammond on "Come Home", "Do I Wait", "Save Me", "Kindness", "Lucky Now", piano on "Ashes and Fire", "Rocks", electric piano on "Dirty Rain", "Invisible Riverside"
- Daniel Clarke – B3 Hammond on "I Love You"
- Gus Seyffert – bass guitar on all songs excluding "Do I Wait", electric guitar on "Ashes and Fire"
- Greg Leisz – pedal steel on "Come Home", "Save Me", "Kindness"
- Neal Casal – acoustic guitar on "Kindness", backing vocals on "Save Me"
- Mandy Moore – backing vocals on "Come Home", "Kindness"
- Chris Stills – backing vocals on "Come Home"
- The Section Quartet – stings on "Rocks", "Chains of Love", "Save Me", "I Love You"
- Eric Gorfain and Daphne Chen – violins on "Rocks", "Chains of Love", "Save Me", "I Love You"
- Lauren Chipman – viola on "Rocks", "Chains of Love", "Save Me", "I Love You"
- Richard Dodd – cello on "Rocks", "Chains of Love", "Save Me", "I Love You"
- Samuel Dixon – bass guitar on "Do I Wait"

=== Recording personnel ===
- Glyn Johns – producer, engineer, mixing
- Bob Ludwig – mastering
- Doug Sax – mastering and cutting for vinyl production at The Mastering Lab, Inc. in Ojai, CA

=== Artwork ===
- Ryan Adams – photography, art
- David Black – photography
- Andy West – art

== Charts ==
Chart (2011)	Peak position
Canadian Albums Chart	21
Irish Album Chart	7
UK Albums Chart	9

As of 2014 it has sold 160,150 copies in United States according to Nielsen SoundScan.
