= Infinity Blues =

2009 book by Ryan Adams

- Infinity Blues cover
- Author: Ryan Adams
- Cover artist: Alexis Fleisig, Ryan Adams, Neal Casal
- Language: English
- Genre: Free verse poetry
- Publisher: Akashic Books
- Publication date: April 1, 2009
- Media type: Print
- Pages: 286
- ISBN: 978-1-933354-83-5
- OCLC: 261176530
- Followed by: Hello Sunshine

Infinity Blues is a book of free verse poetry by singer-songwriter Ryan Adams, published by Akashic Books. The book was set for its official release April 1, 2009. However, it became available in some markets on February 20, 2009. According to Adams, it contains five chapters about "how one person found himself, by losing himself".

“Ryan Adams, one of America’s most consistently interesting singer/songwriters, has written a passionate, arresting, and entertaining book of verse. Fans are going to love it, and newcomers will be pleased and startled by his intensity and originality. The images are vivid and the voice is honest and powerful.”—Stephen King, author of Duma Key.
