= Big Colors =

Studio album by Ryan Adams
- Released: June 11, 2021
- Recorded: 2018
- Length: 38:57
- Label: PAX AM
- Producers: Don Was; Beatriz Artola; Ryan Adams

Ryan Adams chronology
Wednesdays (2020)	Big Colors (2021)	Chris (2022)

Singles from Big Colors
- 1. "Do Not Disturb" Released: April 23, 2021; 2. "Big Colors" Released: May 14, 2021

Big Colors is the eighteenth studio album by American singer-songwriter Ryan Adams. Originally slated for release on April 19, 2019, it was delayed following sexual misconduct allegations against Adams. It was eventually released on June 11, 2021, through Adams's label PAX AM.

== Background and release ==
In January 2019, Adams announced his plans to release three albums that calendar year. The first, Big Colors, was due to be released on April 19 and feature 15 tracks. The second, Wednesdays, was to feature 17 tracks and did not yet have a confirmed release date. Adams did not disclose the name of the third album. To promote Big Colors, Adams premiered the tracks "Doylestown Girl" and "Manchester" on radio and released "Fuck the Rain" as the official lead single from the album. He also announced a UK tour.

The release of all three albums was put on hold after The New York Times published an article in February 2019 in which several women, including Adams's ex-wife Mandy Moore, Phoebe Bridgers, and an underage fan, accused him of abuse and sexual misconduct. "Fuck the Rain" was removed from streaming services and the UK tour was cancelled. Adams has denied the allegations.

On December 11, 2020, Adams eventually surprise-released Wednesdays with a revised track listing, including several tracks originally announced for inclusion on Big Colors. The YouTube description of the music video to the Wednesdays track "I'm Sorry and I Love You" mentioned that Wednesdays was to be the first in a trilogy of albums, including the previously mentioned Big Colors and a third album called Chris. On April 23, 2021, Adams surprise-released "Do Not Disturb" as the lead single from the revised edition of Big Colors on digital services. A release date of June 11 was later announced in May along with a statement from Adams: "Big Colors was created as a 1980s soundtrack to a movie that never existed. Wednesdays was a study of decline and morality; Big Colors is meant to feel like a daydream. New York, where this album was written, always propels me into new, unexpected creative spaces and this album happened to me, more than I can say I happened to it."

== Critical reception ==
Jakob Biazza wrote for the Süddeutsche Zeitung that Big Colors had a "bigger rock pose and a lighter disposition" than Wednesdays. He found that, compared to its predecessor, Big Colors was "more of a rebellion against suffering than wallowing in it". He noted that "the guitars have more twang and more biting colors" and the singing "[is] more piercing and upright", describing this sound as "colder, harder". Writing for Aftonbladet, Håkan Steen called Big Colors "another very solid Ryan Adams record". He opined that the "guitars and arrangements undeniably sound like" the 1980s soundtrack described by Adams and found Big Colors "much more pop" in comparison to Wednesdays. Steen cited "It's So Quiet, It's Loud", "Manchester", and "Showtime" as album highlights, writing that they "could probably have become hits in another reality". However, he described "Power" as "silly".

== Track listing ==
All tracks are written by Ryan Adams. All tracks are produced by Don Was, Beatriz Artola, and Adams.

Big Colors track listing
No.	Title	Length
1.	"Big Colors"	3:05
2.	"Do Not Disturb"	3:00
3.	"It's So Quiet, It's Loud"	3:19
4.	"Fuck the Rain"	3:33
5.	"Manchester"	2:52
6.	"What Am I"	2:48
7.	"Power"	2:42
8.	"I Surrender"	2:39
9.	"Showtime"	4:06
10.	"In It for the Pleasure"	4:20
11.	"Middle of the Line"	2:49
12.	"Summer Rain"	3:45
Total length:		38:57

"Anybody Evil" – bonus 7" disc
No.	Title	Length
1.	"Anybody Evil"
2.	"The Opposite of Love"

Original Tracklisting – for April 2019 release
No.	Title	Length
1.	"Big Colors"
2.	"Do Not Disturb"
3.	"It's So Quiet, It's Loud"
4.	"Fuck the Rain"
5.	"Doylestown Girl"
6.	"Dreaming You Backwards"
7.	"I Surrender"
8.	"What Am I"
9.	"Power"
10.	"Showtime"
11.	"In It For the Pleasure"
12.	"Middle of the Line"
13.	"I'm Sorry and I Love You"
14.	"Manchester"
15.	"Summer Rain"

== Personnel ==
- Ryan Adams – vocals, guitar, bass, piano, synthesizer, percussion
- Johnny T Yerington – drums and percussion (1–4, 6–7, 9, 12)
- Benmont Tench – organ and piano (4, 7)
- John Mayer – guitar (4)
- Aaron Ficca – drums and percussion (5, 8, 11)
- Charlie Stavish – bass (5, 8, 11)
- Tod Wisenbaker – guitar (5, 8, 11)
- Bob Mould – guitar (12)
- The Section Quartet – strings (3, 5, 6, 9)
- Don Was – producer
- Beatriz Artola – producer, engineer
- Gabriel Sganga – assistant engineer
- Jeff Fitzpatrick – assistant engineer
- Matthew Scatchell – assistant engineer
- Brendan McCusker – assistant engineer
- Joe LaPorta – mastering

== Charts ==
Chart performance for Big Colors
Chart (2021)	Peak position
Belgian Albums (Ultratop Flanders)	58
Dutch Albums (Album Top 100)	22
German Albums (Offizielle Top 100)	38
Scottish Albums (Official Charts)	31
Spanish Albums (PROMUSICAE)	91
UK Independent Albums (Official Charts)	20
