= Make Out =

American band (2010–2012)

MAKE OUT
- Origin: New York, New York
- Genres: Pop, rock
- Years active: 2010–2012
- Label: Really Bad
- Spinoffs: Pornography
- Spinoff of: Junior Senior
- Past members: Jesper Mortensen; Leah Hennessey
- Website: www.makeoutwiththeinternet.com

Make Out were a New York City-based band consisting of Jesper Mortensen (ex-Junior Senior), lead vocalist Leah Hennessey (stepdaughter of David Johansen, vocalist of New York Dolls), and drummer Chase Stauffer. The group plays fast, manic, condensed pop songs. In late 2010, the band recorded their debut EP, How To, with producer Nicolas Vernhes (Dirty Projectors, Animal Collective) at his Rare Book Room studios in Brooklyn, New York.

Their debut single, "I Don't Want Anybody That Wants Me", debuted on Spin.com and was subsequently featured in NME, Nylon, My Old Kentucky Blog, and Indie Rock Café. The single received radio play on KCRW (Santa Monica), and modern rock radio stations KROQ (Los Angeles), KTCL (Denver), KFMA (Tucson), WTFX (Louisville), and WBTZ (Burlington). On June 12, 2011, Little Steven named "I Don't Want Anybody That Wants Me" the "coolest song in the world" on his weekly syndicated radio show Underground Garage and officially added the song to the daily playlist (airing on the XM channel "Underground Garage" and several FM stations, including New York City's largest classic rock station, WAXQ, Q104.3).

MAKEOut opened for the New York Dolls at the Bowery Ballroom and also appeared on East Village Radio, Virgin Mobile Live, and Fader Magazine's tripwire podcast. Make Out was featured in the September 2011 issue of i-D magazine.

In October 2011, Make Out released their single "You Can't Be Friends with Everyone", produced by Peter Wade and Amanda Warner from MNDR. They also released a video for the song co-directed by Diane Martel and John Threat. The band and video were featured in Paper Magazine in December 2011. In February 2012, the band released a new single for the song "You're So Party Tonight", which was also produced by Wade and MNDR and recorded at WonderSound NYC.

== Discography ==
=== EP ===
Year	Title
2011	How To, EP: "I Don't Want Anybody That Wants Me"; "What U Doing Later?"; "True Love Is Just Too Hard to Find"

=== Singles ===
Year	Title
2010	"I Don't Want Anybody That Wants Me"
2011	"You Can't Be Friends with Everyone"
2012	"You're So Party Tonight"
2012	"Maybe I'm The One (For Me)"
