= Ten Songs from Live at Carnegie Hall =

Live album by Ryan Adams
- Released: June 9, 2015
- Recorded: November 15th & 17th, 2014
- Venue: Carnegie Hall
- Length: 51:35
- Label: Blue Note Records

Ten Songs from Live at Carnegie Hall is a live album by Ryan Adams, released on June 9, 2015. The album reached peak positions of number 113 on the Billboard 200 and number 14 on Billboard's Top Rock Albums chart, respectively.

== Track listing ==
All tracks are written by Ryan Adams, unless otherwise noted.

No.	Title	Writer(s)	Length
1.	"Oh My Sweet Carolina"		5:26
2.	"Nobody Girl"	Ryan Adams; Ethan Johns	5:45
3.	"New York, New York"		4:35
4.	"Sylvia Plath"	Ryan Adams; Richard Causon	4:31
5.	"This Is Where We Meet in My Mind"		5:21
6.	"My Wrecking Ball"		3:39
7.	"Gimme Something Good"		6:36
8.	"How Much Light"		6:10
9.	"Kim"		3:30
10.	"Come Pick Me Up"	Ryan Adams; William Van Alston	6:02
Total length:			51:35

Track listing adapted from AllMusic.
