= We Are Fuck You =

Studio album by The Finger
- Released: 2003
- Label: One Little Indian

We Are Fuck You is the debut studio album by The Finger, a punk band created by Ryan Adams and Jesse Malin under the Pseudonyms "Warren Peace" and "Irving Plaza" respectively. The album was released on One Little Indian Records in 2003 and is a collection of two earlier EPs recorded in 2002: We Are Fuck You and Punk's Dead Let's Fuck.

== Track listing ==
| No. | Title | Length |
|---|---|---|
| 1. | "Vendetta" |
| 2. | "Collar" |
| 3. | "Coma for $$$" |
| 4. | "Riot" |
| 5. | "Inside My Brain" |
| 6. | "No Roolz" |
| 7. | "Snakes and Scorpions" |
| 8. | "Never Ever" |
| 9. | "Run It Down" |
| 10. | "Wasted Hours" |
| 11. | "Hunger Plan" |
| 12. | "Nail and Tooth" |
| 13. | "No Slaves" |
| 14. | "See No Skin" |
| 15. | "Secret 66" |
| 16. | "Too Stoopid" |
| 17. | "Caspar Lynch" |
| 18. | "Punk's Dead, Let's Fuck" |
| 19. | "What Is It" |
| 20. | "The Finger" |
| 21. | "(untitled bonus track)" |

== Personnel ==
The Finger

- Jim Beahm (Colin Burns) – vocals
- Warren Peace (Ryan Adams) – guitar
- Irving Plaza (Jesse Malin) – bass
- Rick O'Shea (Johnny T. Yerington) – drums
