= Cardinology =

Studio album by Ryan Adams and the Cardinals
- Released: October 28, 2008
- Recorded: Electric Lady (New York City)
- Genres: Alternative country, rock
- Label: Lost Highway Records
- Producer: Tom Schick

Ryan Adams and the Cardinals chronology
Follow the Lights (2007)	Cardinology (2008)	Orion (2010)

Alternate cover
- Vinyl cover art

Professional ratings
Aggregate scores
Source	Rating
AnyDecentMusic?	7.1/10
Metacritic	(72/100)
Review scores
Source	Rating
AllMusic	4/5 stars
Blender	3.5/5 stars
Robert Christgau	(dud)
Entertainment Weekly	A−
Los Angeles Times	2.5/4 stars
MusicOMH	4/5 stars
Paste	(6.4/10)
Pitchfork	(4.7/10)
PopMatters	6/10 stars
Rolling Stone	4/5 stars
Spin	(7/10)
USA Today	3/4 stars

Cardinology is the tenth studio album by Ryan Adams, and fourth album with his backing band The Cardinals, released on October 28, 2008. The album completed Adams' contract with Lost Highway Records, and marks his final recording session with The Cardinals. Following the album's release and subsequent tour, Adams disbanded the band and entered a self-imposed hiatus until the release of Ashes & Fire, in 2011.

According to Adams, the album "[is] about the moment when you recognise the difference between ego and pride and your sense of service to your friends, family or yourself. Once you've had that epiphany, you can't really turn around and pretend that you haven't. It's about accountability."

The album was placed at #14 on Rolling Stone's 50 Best Albums of 2008 list. The magazine also placed "Magick" at #13 on the 100 Best Singles of 2008 list. The album has sold over 250,000 copies worldwide. In April 2011, Adams released an EP, Class Mythology, featuring four unreleased tracks recorded for Cardinology.

== Writing and composition ==
Cardinology was written and recorded in the aftermath of Adams' break-up with girlfriend Jessica Joffe, with Adams stating, "There's a lot of disappointment on this record. There's the pain of lost love and the brutality of unrequited love. It was a dark place to go, but this time I managed to go there with a bit of balance. I tried to make sure there were at least one or two lines in every song that, should someone be listening who is having a bad time, there's something there telling them to keep the faith. I wanted to find that hope. I didn't fully find it, but I was trying."

== Release ==
A vinyl version included a bonus 7", a comic book, and a digital download code. The album's first single, "Fix It", was released on vinyl and online on September 23, 2008.

In 2014, Adams reflected upon the album, and the final line-up of The Cardinals, stating: "That wasn’t the creative band. The proof of that is, listen to Cardinology, then go listen to Cold Roses. You fucking tell me where the power is. It ain’t in the end. There was nothing there."

== Reception ==
The album so far has a score of 72 out of 100 from Metacritic based on "generally favorable reviews". Silent Sound Waves gave it a score of five sound waves out of six and said it was " brave and successful in its flow and creativity. A must have for Ryan Adams fans and something worthwhile for curious listeners." Hot Press gave it a favorable review and called it "an album worthy of high praises." Billboard also gave it a favorable review and said, "Musically, the band works up a handsome country rock sound with shades of the Rolling Stones and Wilco throughout, making room for swagger ('Fix It,' 'Magick') and sentimentality ('Natural Ghost,' 'Evergreen') in equal measure." Similarly, The Boston Globe gave it a favorable review and said, "If only a few of the tracks rise to the greatest heights of which Adams is capable--like the poignant closing salute to sobriety, 'Stop'--the rest remain impressive pictures of craftsmanship." Prefix Magazine also gave it a favorable review and said it " jettisons the schizoid, freewheeling genre-hopping of previous records, giving the album--and, most important, the songs--an intensity of focus where there was once just intensity."

The A.V. Club gave it a B and stated: "Even at his slightest--and Cardinology is pretty slight--Adams always turns out likeable ear candy." Tiny Mix Tapes gave it three-and-a-half stars out of five and said: "The new attention to cleanly produced and perfectly played and arranged backdrops function as both a blessing and a curse."

Other reviews are average or mixed: Uncut gave it a score of three stars out of five and said it ultimately "serves as another minor indictment of Adams’ famously lackadaisical internal editor. Nevertheless, it is still, almost infuriatingly, a stretch better than most people at their best." Yahoo! Music UK gave the album only five stars out of ten and said, "The first half of the album as a whole is easy to forget....Cardinology takes a turn for the best around the midway point." Under the Radar also gave it five stars out of ten and said that "if you’ve always wanted to hear U2’s frontman lead a hook-filled classic country/rock band, Cardinology is for you. If, however, you’re waiting for Adams to deliver the classic album his prodigious talents seem capable of, you’re stuck waiting until his multiple personality disorder wears off and he remembers who he is." Slant Magazine gave the album two-and-a-half stars and stated that "too often Cardinology seems content to float along on an oily sea of good feelings and bad attitude."

== Track listing ==
All tracks are written by Ryan Adams.

No.	Title	Length
1.	"Born into a Light"	2:16
2.	"Go Easy"	2:56
3.	"Fix it"	3:00
4.	"Magick"	2:17
5.	"Cobwebs"	3:57
6.	"Let Us Down Easy"	4:21
7.	"Crossed Out Name"	2:44
8.	"Natural Ghost"	3:39
9.	"Sink Ships"	3:38
10.	"Evergreen"	3:36
11.	"Like Yesterday"	2:32
12.	"Stop"	5:34
13.	"The Color of Pain" (iTunes Bonus Track)	3:05
14.	"Memory Lane" (UK Bonus Track)	3:02

Vinyl version bonus 7"
No.	Title	Length
1.	"Heavy Orange"	2:42
2.	"Asteroid"	3:18

== Personnel ==
=== Ryan Adams & the Cardinals ===
- Ryan Adams – vocals, acoustic guitar (1, 5, 8, 9 and 10), electric guitar (2, 3, 4, 5, 6, 8, 9 and 11), piano (2 and 12), bass guitar (7 and 8), drums (7), synth (7), Fender Rhodes guitar (8), keyboards (10)
- Neal Casal – acoustic guitar (1, 2, 3, 4, 5, 6, 8, 9 and 10), electric guitar (2, 3, 4, 5, 6, 9 and 11), backing vocals (1, 2, 3, 4, 5, 6, 9, 10, 11 and 12), piano (1, 2, 7, 8, 9 and 10), Wurlitzer (2, 3, 4, 6 and 8)
- Chris Feinstein – bass guitar, backing vocals (1, 5, 6 and 11)
- Jon Graboff – pedal steel guitar, backing vocals (1, 2, 3, 5, 6, 8 and 11), electric guitar (6)
- Brad Pemberton – drums, percussion

=== Additional musicians ===
- Michael Panes – violin (12)

=== Recording personnel ===
- Tom Schick – producer, engineer
- Noah Goldstein – assistant engineer, additional engineering, effects
- Bob Ludwig – mastering

=== Artwork ===
- Leah Hayes – cartoonist for vinyl release
- Andy West – design
- Neal Casal – photography

== Charts ==
Chart performance
Chart (2008)	Peak position
Australian Albums (ARIA)	70
Belgian Albums (Ultratop Flanders)	54
Canadian Albums (Nielsen SoundScan)	31
Dutch Albums (Album Top 100)	72
Dutch Alternative Albums (Alternative Top 30)	4
German Albums (Offizielle Top 100)	98
Irish Albums (IRMA)	52
Italian Albums (FIMI)	92
New Zealand Albums (RMNZ)	31
Norwegian Albums (VG-lista)	22
Scottish Albums (Official Charts)	35
Swedish Albums (Sverigetopplistan)	41
UK Albums (Official Charts)	41
US Billboard 200	11
US Indie Store Album Sales (Billboard)	1
US Top Rock Albums (Billboard)	3
