= Hello Sunshine (book) =

2009 collection of short stories by Ryan Adams

- Hello Sunshine's working cover
- Author: Ryan Adams
- Language: English
- Genre: Free verse poetry, short stories
- Publisher: Akashic Books
- Publication date: December 1, 2009 (US); January 7, 2010 (UK)
- Media type: Print
- Preceded by: Infinity Blues

Hello Sunshine is a collection of poems and short stories by Ryan Adams, released on December 1, 2009. The book is published by Akashic Books.

Adams states that: "this is the book of verse where I wake up, where I see myself responding to a world with as much light and as much grace as whatever disappointment I felt. This is where I fell back in love with everything--this is my best work yet." (Preorders of Hello Sunshine were shipped on 18 August 2009 by publisher Akashic Books).

== Reviews ==
Gawker said Adams' prose is like "shiny gold covered shit". Indy Week said "the poems are petulant, myopic and petty".
