= Wednesdays (album) =

Studio album by Ryan Adams
- Released: December 11, 2020
- Genre: Americana
- Length: 42:27
- Label: PAX AM
- Producers: Don Was; Beatriz Artola; Ryan Adams

Ryan Adams chronology
Prisoner (2017)	Wednesdays (2020)	Big Colors (2021)

Wednesdays is the seventeenth studio album by American singer-songwriter Ryan Adams. Originally slated for release in 2019, it was delayed following abuse allegations against Adams. It was eventually surprise-released digitally on December 11, 2020, through Adams's label PAX AM. Physical editions were released on March 19, 2021.

== Background and release ==
In January 2019, Adams announced his plans to release three albums that calendar year. The first, Big Colors, was due to be released April 19 and feature 15 tracks. The second, Wednesdays, was to feature 17 tracks and did not yet have a confirmed release date. Adams did not disclose the name of the third album. The release of all three albums was put on hold after The New York Times published an article in February 2019 in which several women, including Adams's ex-wife Mandy Moore, Phoebe Bridgers, and an underage fan, accused him of abuse and sexual misconduct. Adams has denied the allegations. After a five-month silence, he returned in July 2019, posting a soundboard recording of a song titled "I'm Sorry and I Love You".

On December 11, 2020, Adams eventually surprise-released Wednesdays, which features "I'm Sorry and I Love You" as well as several tracks originally announced for inclusion on Big Colors. Physical editions were released on March 19, 2021, and the vinyl version includes an additional 7-inch record titled "It's Not That Kind of Night". A music video for "I'm Sorry and I Love You" was uploaded to YouTube on December 15, 2020. Its description mentions that Wednesdays is the first in a trilogy of albums.

== Artwork and title ==
The album cover features a cropped reproduction of Siebe Johannes ten Cate's painting La gare du Nord.

Adams said of the title: "Limbo. That's what a Wednesday is sometimes. Maybe a portal. Maybe a bridge across. But it can hang there like a forever unless maybe you're out to sea and everything is just another token of the blue."

== Critical reception ==
Professional ratings
Review scores
Source	Rating
AllMusic	2/5 stars
Rolling Stone Germany	3.5/5 stars

Stephen Thomas Erlewine of AllMusic rated Wednesdays two out of five stars and noted the album's "spare arrangements and threadbare melodies". He opined that, in light of the allegations against Adams, "the songs collectively create an impression of a singer/songwriter who feels quite sorry for himself, but not necessarily sorry for anything he may or may not have done". He highlighted the songs "I'm Sorry and I Love You" and "Who Is Going to Love Me Now, If Not You" for "echo[ing] excuses from abusers, whether intentionally or not". Writing for the German print edition of Rolling Stone, Birgit Fuss rated Wednesdays three and a half out of five stars. She opined that it is "a classic Ryan Adams album: it consists mostly of self-pity and self-accusations" and that "the track titles essentially tell the whole story". Describing the music as "the most beautiful Americana garb one can imagine", she concluded her review by writing that "Adams has not sounded this inspired in a long time and it has never been so difficult to be happy about it".

Many print and online music publications that have reviewed Adams' previous albums, such as Spin and Pitchfork, did not publish reviews of Wednesdays, or even mention its release. However, the album has received a number of accolades from notable figures in the music industry, such as musicians Lucinda Williams and Lindsey Buckingham and former Rolling Stone editor Cameron Crowe.

== Track listing ==
All tracks are written by Ryan Adams. All tracks are produced by Don Was, Beatriz Artola, and Adams.

Wednesdays
No.	Title	Length
1.	"I'm Sorry and I Love You"	3:34
2.	"Who Is Going to Love Me Now, If Not You"	3:31
3.	"When You Cross Over"	4:19
4.	"Walk in the Dark"	4:11
5.	"Poison & Pain"	3:09
6.	"Wednesdays"	5:25
7.	"Birmingham"	3:11
8.	"So, Anyways"	3:46
9.	"Mamma"	4:23
10.	"Lost in Time"	3:54
11.	"Dreaming You Backwards"	3:04
Total length:		42:27

"It's Not That Kind of Night" – bonus 7" disc
No.	Title	Length
1.	"It's Not That Kind of Night"	3:09
2.	"Sunflowers"	2:57

== Personnel ==
- Ryan Adams – vocals, guitar, piano (1, 3, 11), harmonica (3, 8), tom tom (5), producer
- Don Was – bass (1, 3, 4, 6, 9–11), double bass (2, 8), producer
- Brendan McCusker – drums (1, 11), engineer
- Stephen Patt – pedal steel (1, 8, 10), dobro (2, 8)
- Zach Dellinger – viola (1)
- Fred Bows – violin (1)
- The Section Quartet – strings (2, 3, 9)
- Emmylou Harris – backing vocals (3, 9)
- Aaron Ficca – drums (3, 7)
- Benmont Tench – organ (4–8), piano (5, 7, 8)
- Charlie Stavish – bass (7), engineer
- Todd Wisenbaker – electric guitar (7)
- Beatriz Artola – synth (9), producer, engineer
- Arnold McCuller – backing vocals (11)
- Sir Harry Bowens – backing vocals (11)
- Hilliard 'Sweet Pea' Atkinson – backing vocals (11)
- Gabriel Sganga – engineer
- Jeff Fitzpatrick – assistant engineer
- Matthew Scatchell – assistant engineer
- Joe LaPorta – mastering

== Charts ==
Chart performance for Wednesdays
Chart (2021)	Peak position
Australian Albums (ARIA)	88
Austrian Albums (Ö3 Austria)	53
Belgian Albums (Ultratop Flanders)	47
Belgian Albums (Ultratop Wallonia)	135
Dutch Albums (Album Top 100)	10
German Albums (Offizielle Top 100)	13
Scottish Albums (Official Charts)	10
Swedish Vinyl Albums (Sverigetopplistan)	4
Swiss Albums (Schweizer Hitparade)	45
