= The Finger (band) =

American hardcore punk band

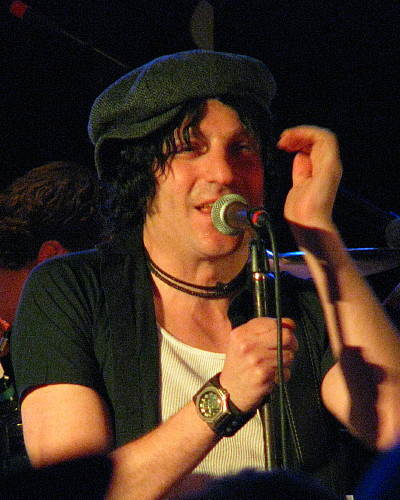
Jesse Malin

The Finger was a hardcore punk band, formed by Ryan Adams and Jesse Malin, under the pseudonyms "Warren Peace" and "Irving Plaza" respectively (along with Colin Burns and Johnny T. Yerington as "Jim Beahm" and "Rick O'Shea"). The name derived from notorious early/mid-1990s Raleigh, North Carolina rock band Finger, of which Adams was a big fan. This light-hearted project allowed both artists to return to their punk backgrounds (Adams began his music career as singer for The Patty Duke Syndrome and Malin began his career in the hardcore punk band Heart Attack and more famously as the lead singer of D Generation). They began by releasing two EPs, We Are Fuck You and Punk's Dead Let's Fuck, which were later collected to form the album We Are Fuck You, released in 2003.

== Discography ==
- We Are Fuck You (2003)
