= III/IV =

Studio album by Ryan Adams & the Cardinals
- Released: December 14, 2010
- Recorded: Electric Lady (New York City)
- Genres: Alternative country, country rock, rock
- Length: 66:55
- Label: PAX AM
- Producer: Jamie Candiloro

Ryan Adams chronology
Orion (2010)	III/IV (2010)	Ashes & Fire (2011)

III/IV is the twelfth studio album by alt-country singer-songwriter Ryan Adams, released on December 14, 2010 through PAX AM. The album is his fifth with backing band The Cardinals, and was recorded in 2006 during the same sessions that yielded Easy Tiger. A double album, III/IV was recorded prior to bassist Catherine Popper's departure, and also marks guitarist and backing vocalist Neal Casal's recording debut for the band. According to Adams, the album remained unreleased until 2010, as his former label, Lost Highway, had previously rejected it.

According to producer and keyboardist Jamie Candiloro, the album's title stems from "the idea that Cold Roses [is] volumes one and two, and this was a logical step that the Cardinals had taken forward as a band effort. The tracks shared the democratic process of a band. It will always be an amazing look into the world of a great band during one of its most versatile line-ups."

Orders from the PAX AM online store also received a download card for 11 bonus demos from the album.

The album peaked at number 59 on the Billboard 200 chart in January 2011. It has sold over 47,000 copies.

== Background and recording ==
In mid-2006, following a disagreement with his label, Lost Highway, Ryan Adams contacted producer Jamie Candiloro asking for assistance in recording new material. The sessions would mark the first time that Adams had been sober since he was fifteen years old.

Prior to the album's release in late 2010, drummer Brad Pemberton stated: "Coming off Cold Roses and Jacksonville City Nights, I wasn’t expecting this. A flurry of rock songs written by a man who had made some big changes in his life and was owning up to some mistakes. There is a hopefulness and renewed lust for life in these lyrics, and that inspired what I think is some of the best songs we ever recorded. I don’t often listen to the records we made, but over the past four years, I’ve indulged myself with these songs, and I'm so happy they are finally going to be heard. The bulk of these tunes were done in just a few days at Electric Lady, where Ryan had been holed up for a while writing and recording. Of course, while there we also managed to record Easy Tiger."

== Critical reception ==
Professional ratings
Aggregate scores
Source	Rating
AnyDecentMusic?	6.1/10
Metacritic	(71/100)
Review scores
Source	Rating
AllMusic	4/5 stars
Alternative Press	3/5 stars
The A.V. Club	B–
Entertainment Weekly	B+
No Ripcord	7/10 stars
Pitchfork	(6.9/10)
PopMatters	6/10 stars
Rolling Stone	3.5/5 stars
Spin	(7/10)
Under the Radar	4/10 stars

The album has a score of 71 out of 100 from Metacritic based on "generally favorable reviews".

IGN gave the album a score of eight out of ten and concluded, "There are a few rough spots, but even the lesser songs offer plenty to enjoy. [...] In the end, this scattered but rewarding album leaves you hoping the next album comes more quickly." Consequence of Sound gave it a score of four stars out of five and said, "With music from the nerdy recesses of his mind, to a triumphant release that happily displays some of his more off-center offerings, Adams continues to be a presence in music, this year and beyond." The Boston Globe gave it a favorable review and said that it "could easily be whittled down to a single excellent disc, but instead offers two pretty good ones." Beats Per Minute gave it a 71% and said, "There is still plenty to cherish here, and no Ryan Adams devotee is going to feel disappointed. In reality, this is likely just another detour in the ever evolving and confusing career of Ryan Adams." Sputnikmusic gave it a score of 3.5 out of five and said that most of the songs "come off as what you'd expect: a massive talent messing around in the studio and crafting some perfectly serviceable rock tunes." The New York Times gave it a positive review and said that in the end the album "may be of interest more for therapeutic than aesthetic reasons". Paste gave it a score of seven out of ten and said, "Adams could still use a good editor to separate the wheat from the chaff, but the good thing about a demos compilation is that it doesn't have to be well-edited, and III/IV is better than most."

Other reviews are average or mixed: Uncut gave it a score of three stars out of five and said that the album "often sounds like hollow noise--but improves when [Adams] warms down." Now also gave it a score of three stars out of five and said, "There's plenty here to compare to his unfairly criticized Rock N Roll record: new wave influences, contemporary alt-rock. The difference is that Adams sounds comfortable rather than out to prove a point." Prefix Magazine gave it a mixed review and said that until Adams "learns to translate the raw, confessional edge of his music to his work in the genre, the results will always be as unsatisfying as III/IV."

== Track listing ==
All tracks are written by Ryan Adams.

Disc one
No.	Title	Length
1.	"Breakdown into the Resolve"	4:01
2.	"Dear Candy"	2:31
3.	"Wasteland"	3:13
4.	"Ultraviolet Light"	3:43
5.	"Stop Playing with My Heart"	2:39
6.	"Lovely and Blue"	2:34
7.	"Happy Birthday"	2:28
8.	"Kisses Start Wars"	2:57
9.	"The Crystal Skull"	3:33
10.	"Users"	2:58

Disc two
No.	Title	Length
1.	"No"	3:03
2.	"Numbers"	2:54
3.	"Gracie"	3:31
4.	"Icebreaker"	2:13
5.	"Sewers at the Bottom of the Wishing Well"	2:42
6.	"Typecast"	3:18
7.	"Star Wars"	2:45
8.	"My Favorite Song"	3:15
9.	"P.S."	2:44
10.	"Death and Rats"	2:35
11.	"Kill the Lights"	7:29

Bonus tracks
No.	Title	Length
1.	"Cemetery Hill" (iTunes exclusive track)	3:40
2.	"Destroyers" (free download from PAX AM online)	4:25
3.	"The Blue Canoe" (free download from PAX AM online)	2:15
4.	"Darkness" (free download from PAX AM online)	5:34

Bonus Demo Download
No.	Title	Length
1.	"Breakdown into the Resolve"	3:59
2.	"Numbers"	3:11
3.	"Kisses Start Wars"	3:30
4.	"Kill the Lights"	4:36
5.	"(You Make Me Feel Like) A Natural Ghost"	2:35
6.	"No"	2:25
7.	"Icebreaker"	1:51
8.	"Happy Birthday"	2:20
9.	"My Reflection"	3:56
10.	"Users"	2:51
11.	"Death and Rats"	1:44

== Personnel ==
- Ryan Adams - vocals, guitars, piano, bass, synth
- Neal Casal - guitars, background vocals
- Jon Graboff - pedal steel, 12 string guitar
- Brad Pemberton - drums, percussion
- Catherine Popper - bass, background vocals
- Jamie Candiloro - organ, drums, percussion, keys, synth, piano
- Norah Jones - background vocals on "Typecast"
