= Orion (Ryan Adams album) =

Studio album by Ryan Adams
- Released: May 18, 2010
- Recorded: Electric Lady (New York City)
- Genres: Hard rock; heavy metal
- Length: 28:22
- Label: PAX AM
- Producer: Jamie Candiloro

Ryan Adams chronology
Cardinology (2008)	Orion (2010)	III/IV (2010)

Professional ratings
Review scores
Source	Rating
Beats Per Minute	65%
Consequence of Sound	3/5 stars

Orion is the eleventh studio album by American singer-songwriter Ryan Adams, released on May 18, 2010, by Adams' own record label PAX AM. Described as Adams' first "fully-realized sci-fi metal concept album," Orion was released on a limited vinyl run, and could only be purchased from the PAX AM online store. There are no plans for a wide release, but as of November 4, 2010, Adams' new site paxamrecords.com is offering a standard edition vinyl that will also include the download card of the entire album. Those who purchased the album in its limited run also received a bonus 7" single.

The album was recorded in 2006, while working on Easy Tiger with producer Jamie Candiloro, and is Adams' first full-length album release since splitting from The Cardinals in March 2009.

Orion's artwork was designed by Michel Langevin of Voivod.

== Influences ==
On the popular Ryan Adams forum, Ryan Adams Archive, Adams posted the following regarding Orion's stylistic influences:

Anyone who loved this record, seriously, please seek out Angel Rat and Nothingface by Voivod. The entire record was my way of saying "thank you" to Denis D'Amour for many years of inspiring me after I learned of his untimely death from colon cancer. [...] He was a wonderful guitarist and for all accounts and amazing gifted man. In fact I dedicated the album 29 to him also but it was, of course, not in the style of his wonderful music. Although, I have used his "backwards barred chords" idea in nearly every one of my Cardinals songs since.

== Track listing ==
No.	Title	Length
1.	"Signal Fade"	2:49
2.	"Imminent Galactic War"	1:49
3.	"Disappyramid"	2:13
4.	"Fire Away"	1:02
5.	"Defenders of the Galaxy"	1:36
6.	"Fire and Ice"	3:49
7.	"By Force"	2:35
8.	"Ghorgon, Master of War"	2:33
9.	"Ariel"	1:52
10.	"Electro Snake"	1:44
11.	"Victims of the Ice Brigade"	2:06
12.	"2,000 Ships"	1:48
13.	"End of Days"	2:26

Limited First Release Bonus 7"
No.	Title	Length
1.	"Valhalla"	2:08
2.	"Crossing Foggy Mountains"	0:53

== Personnel ==
- Ryan Adams – vocals and guitars
- Jamie Candiloro – synths
- Dale Nixon – bass
