= Ryan Adams (album) =

Album by Ryan Adams

Studio album by Ryan Adams
- Released: September 8, 2014
- Recorded: PAX AM Studios, California
- Genres: Rock, indie rock
- Length: 42:33
- Label: Pax AM
- Producers: Ryan Adams, Mike Viola, Charlie Stavish

Ryan Adams chronology
| 1984 (2014) | Ryan Adams (2014) | 1989 (2015) |

Singles from Ryan Adams
- 1. "Gimme Something Good" Released: July 1, 2014; 2. "Stay With Me"

Ryan Adams is the 14th studio album by American singer-songwriter Ryan Adams, released on September 8, 2014, on PAX AM. The album features an atmospheric rock-based aesthetic, in comparison to its primarily acoustic predecessor, Ashes & Fire (2011).

Self-produced by Adams, and his recording partner Mike Viola, the album was preceded by the single, "Gimme Something Good", and was recorded following the completion of a now-abandoned studio album, recorded by Adams' Ashes & Fire collaborator, Glyn Johns. The album earned two nominations at the 56th Annual Grammy Awards in Best Rock Song for "Gimme Something Good" and Best Rock Album.

Professional ratings
Aggregate scores
| Source | Rating |
|---|---|
| AnyDecentMusic? | 7.1/10 |
| Metacritic | 77/100 |
Review scores
| Source | Rating |
| AllMusic | 4/5 stars |
| Entertainment Weekly | A |
| The Guardian | 3/5 stars |
| Mojo | 4/5 stars |
| NME | 8/10 |
| Pitchfork | 6.0/10 |
| PopMatters | 8/10 |
| Q | 4/5 stars |
| Rolling Stone | 3.5/5 stars |
| Uncut | 7/10 |

== Background ==
Following the release of Ashes & Fire (2011), and its successful accompanying tour, Adams returned to the studio in 2012 to record its follow-up with producer Glyn Johns. The planned album was set to include "more orchestral flourishes" than its primarily stripped-back predecessor. In March 2013, Adams debuted two new songs, "Where I Meet You In My Mind" and "In The Shadows", at a one-off live performance. The concert was Adams' first with a backing band since the dissolution of The Cardinals in 2009. The band included Ashes & Fire session musicians, Benmont Tench (keyboards) and Jeremy Stacey (drums); former Cardinals member Cindy Cashdollar (pedal steel); Adams' regular collaborator Ethan Johns (guitar) and Don Was (bass). This performing line-up were reported to be the musicians performing on Adams' forthcoming studio album.

News of the album's recording and eventual release began to fade, with Adams recording albums for other artists at his studio, PAX AM. During this time, Adams produced Fall Out Boy's PAX AM Days (2013), Ethan Johns' The Reckoning (2014), and Jenny Lewis's The Voyager (2014). In 2013, Adams also formed a punk rock band entitled Pornography, releasing a limited edition EP, 7 Minutes in Heaven, for Record Store Day 2013.

In 2014, it was revealed that Adams had scrapped the Glyn Johns-produced successor to Ashes & Fire, and had started afresh at his studios, PAX AM, with his recording partner Mike Viola, and bass guitarist Tal Wilkenfeld. The planned album had been greatly influenced by the death of Adams' grandmother, and reportedly cost $100,000 to produce. Regarding his decision to halt the album's release, Adams noted, "We were recording it in the same a way as Ashes & Fire. It just didn't feel to me the way Ashes & Fire did, and it didn't feel like I was exploring or getting anywhere. By the time it was done, I had this impression like, this is a record that sounds like it was produced by somebody. Like another record. Someone else's vision of my songs."

== Recording ==
Ryan Adams was recorded at Adams' home analogue studio, PAX AM, which he described as "like the Millennium Falcon. So many possibilities." The decision to record at PAX AM was a major factor in the album's creation, with Adams' stating that Glyn Johns had preferred not to use Adams' studio: "[He] didn't want to use my studio because his favorite room to record in, according to him, in the entire world, is Sunset Sound Studio B. The difference is, that's right next door to my studio, and four days in that studio next door at Sunset Sound is equal to my rent at my studio once a month. So I really didn't feel like making that record, but I wanted to give Glyn and myself the benefit of the doubt to try another record."

After working with producers on each of his previous studio albums, Ryan Adams is the first full studio album to be self-produced by Ryan Adams. Upon the album's release he noted, "I don't know why it took me so long to just fucking — I guess maybe because I have PAX-AM now, my studio — but I don't know why it took so long to basically be like: You know what, I'm going to do this my way, and even if it's fucking weird I'm going to do it my way. [...] There was always somebody somewhere with some fucking idea that I should work with some producer, or there was always some producer that I was working with who I knew. People felt like they could frame my music in a certain way that somehow shined the correct amount of light." Adams recorded the album with his PAX AM recording partner and now bandmate Mike Viola: "Mike is a co-producer. It's collaborative, but Mike and I were already on that train anyway. Mike was more like a partner in crime toward a sound he knew would work for me. We recorded in my studio all week, every week, every fucking day. I view it as a job. I want to come here, you know?"

== Writing and composition ==
After scrapping the Glyn Johns-produced studio album, which featured "entirely different songs" than those that appear on Ryan Adams, Adams began working on compositions that he felt reflected his true personality, stating, "I'm too old to pretend like I give a shit about doing something that's not what I am." Adams was inspired by the rock and punk musicians he grew up admiring: "The music that really, really mattered to me, that was emotional music that was fraught with electric guitar — nothing's ever going to be more important to me than The Wipers, Hüsker Dü, The Replacements. Guys you could just tell they're grabbing a guitar, they're just lost in a moment that's urgent and they're finding chords that reflect that urgency. And maybe finding pop elements, but also maybe finding discordant elements. I think there's a simplicity to that stuff that's always kind of been there, and kind of been hiding out in my music, and waiting to be revealed."

Regarding the album's lyrical content, he noted, "[I would] go in with a couple bros at seven o'clock and just jam. We would, like, smoke a bowl and drink some tea – and the words came free-flowing out of me. It gives me chills just talking about it."

Comparing the album to his past work, Adams noted: "I personally think it sounds more like Cold Roses, some of Love is Hell and a little of Easy Tiger – but not the sound of it, more the chords and the way it came together organically. [...] The songs are ends in themselves and records are their own sort of book or movie."

== Title ==
Regarding his decision to release a self-titled album, Adams stated: "I could not think of a name for this record. Everything I came up with sounded so stupid. Everything sounded like a King Crimson album title, some convoluted shit. [...] I was like, I can't call this Shadows or something, I just can't do it."

== Commercial performance ==
The album debuted at No. 1 on the Billboard's Top Rock Album, making this Adams' first No. 1 on that chart. It was his highest yet debut on Billboard 200 at No. 4, with 45,000 copies sold in its debut week. The album has sold 118,000 copies in the US as of October 2015.

== Track listing ==
All tracks are written by Ryan Adams.

| No. | Title | Length |
|---|---|---|
| 1. | "Gimme Something Good" | 3:55 |
| 2. | "Kim" | 3:26 |
| 3. | "Trouble" | 3:47 |
| 4. | "Am I Safe" | 4:32 |
| 5. | "My Wrecking Ball" | 3:08 |
| 6. | "Stay with Me" | 3:06 |
| 7. | "Shadows" | 5:22 |
| 8. | "Feels Like Fire" | 4:25 |
| 9. | "I Just Might" | 3:29 |
| 10. | "Tired of Giving Up" | 3:40 |
| 11. | "Let Go" | 3:43 |

== Personnel ==
=== Musicians ===
- Ryan Adams – all vocals, guitars
- Jeremy Stacey – drums
- Benmont Tench – organ and piano weirdness
- Mike Viola – all sorts of stuff
- Tal Wilkenfeld – bass
- Marshall Vore – drums, percussion (8)

=== Additional musicians ===
- Johnny Depp – guitar on "Kim", guitar and vocals on "Feels Like Fire"(2, 8)
- Mandy Moore – vocals on "Trouble" and "Am I Safe" (3, 4)

=== Recording personnel ===
- Ryan Adams – producer
- Mike Viola – co-producer (1, 3, 4, 6, 8, 10)
- Charlie Stavish – engineer, mixing, co-producer (2)
- David LaBrel – additional engineering
- Howie Weinberg, Gentry Studer – mastering

=== Artwork ===
- Andy West Design – art
- Julia Brokaw, Alice Baxley, Ryan Adams – photography
- Noah Abrams – couch photograph

== Singles ==
1. A-side: "Gimme Something Good" / B-side: "Aching for More"

== Charts ==
=== Weekly charts ===
| Chart (2014) | Peak position |
|---|---|
| Australian Albums (ARIA) | 10 |
| Canadian Albums (Billboard) | 7 |
| Norwegian Albums (VG-lista) | 7 |
| UK Albums (Official Charts) | 6 |
| US Billboard 200 | 4 |
| US Top Rock Albums (Billboard) | 1 |
| US Americana/Folk Albums (Billboard) | 1 |

=== Year-end charts ===
| Chart (2014) | Position |
|---|---|
| US Folk Albums (Billboard) | 8 |
| US Top Rock Albums (Billboard) | 55 |
