= Ryan Adams =

American musician (born 1974)

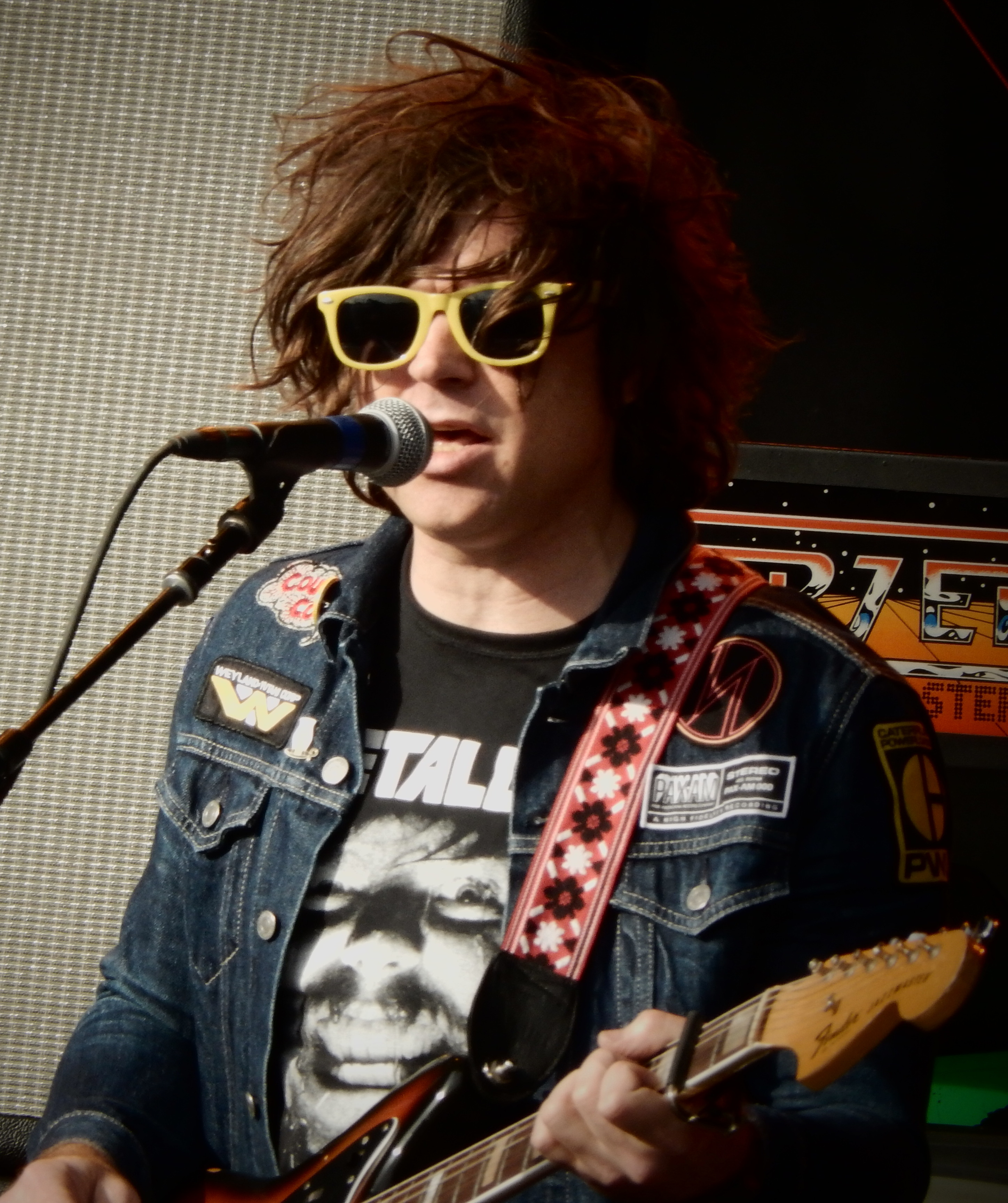
- Adams performing in 2015

Background information
- Born: David Ryan Adams; November 5, 1974 (age 52); Jacksonville, North Carolina, U.S.
- Genres: Rock; alternative country; folk rock; indie rock
- Occupations: Singer; songwriter; record producer; author
- Instruments: Vocals; guitar; piano; banjo; bass guitar; harmonica; percussion
- Years active: 1990–present
- Labels: Bloodshot; Lost Highway; PAX AM; Blue Note; Capitol
- Member of: The Cardinals
- Formerly of: The Patty Duke Syndrome; Whiskeytown; The Finger; Pornography
- Spouse: Mandy Moore (m. 2009; div. 2016)
- Website: ryanadamsofficial.com

David Ryan Adams (born November 5, 1974) is an American rock and country singer-songwriter. He has released 30 studio albums and 3 as a member of Whiskeytown.

In 2000, Adams left Whiskeytown and released his debut solo album, Heartbreaker, to critical acclaim. The album was nominated for the Shortlist Music Prize. The following year, his profile increased with the release of the UK certified-gold Gold, which included the single "New York, New York". During this time, Adams worked on several unreleased albums, which were consolidated into a third solo release, Demolition (2002). Working at a prolific rate, Adams released the classic rock-influenced Rock N Roll (2003), after a planned album, Love Is Hell, was rejected by his Lost Highway label. As a compromise, Love Is Hell was released as two EPs and eventually released in its full-length state in 2004.

After breaking his wrist during a live performance, Adams took a hiatus and formed a backing band called the Cardinals, who supported him on his next four studio albums. In 2009, due to complications from Ménière's disease, Adams disbanded the Cardinals and took a break from music. However, he returned to the music scene in 2010, releasing his 13th studio album, Ashes & Fire. Adams released his 14th album, Ryan Adams in 2014.

In 2015, Adams gained attention for his cover album 1989, a song-for-song cover of Taylor Swift's album of the same name. In 2019, several women accused Adams of sexual harassment, leading to a delay in the release of three planned albums. Adams later issued an apology and eventually released six more albums between 2020 and 2022. In addition to his own material, Adams has also produced albums for Willie Nelson, Jesse Malin, Jenny Lewis, and Fall Out Boy, and has collaborated with Counting Crows, Weezer, Norah Jones, America, Minnie Driver, Cowboy Junkies, Leona Naess, Toots and the Maytals, Beth Orton, and Krista Polvere. He has written Infinity Blues, a book of poems, and Hello Sunshine, collection of poems and short stories.

== Early life ==
David Ryan Adams was born on November 5, 1974, in Jacksonville, North Carolina. He is the middle child of three, with an older brother and younger sister. His childhood has been described as "dysfunctional". His father left when he was five at which time he, his mother and his siblings had to move in with his grandparents since they became homeless as a result of the divorce. He has said in an interview, "I became who I am now because of my grandparents" and of his grandmother "...she was like a mother to me." His mother remarried when he was 13.

At the age of eight, Adams began writing short stories and limericks on his grandmother's typewriter. In his own words, "I started writing short stories when I was really into Edgar Allan Poe. Then later, when I was a teenager, I got really hard into cult fiction: Hubert Selby Jr., Henry Miller, Jack Kerouac." At 14, Adams began learning to play an electric guitar his mother and stepfather had bought him and soon joined a local band named Blank Label. While they quickly disbanded, they did record a short three-track 7-inch record, in 1991.

Adams dropped out of Jacksonville High School in 10th grade, at the age of 16, subsequently moving into bandmate Jere McIlwean's rental house, just outside Jacksonville. Around this time, he played and performed with a number of local bands, most notably his and McIlwean's The Patty Duke Syndrome. After obtaining his GED, Adams left Jacksonville for Raleigh, shortly followed by McIlwean. The Patty Duke Syndrome broke up in 1994 after releasing a split 7-inch single with GlamourPuss.

== Career ==
=== Whiskeytown ===
Following the breakup of his high school band, The Patty Duke Syndrome, Adams helped found Whiskeytown with Caitlin Cary, Eric "Skillet" Gilmore, Steve Grothmann and Phil Wandscher. Whiskeytown saw Adams move to alt-country, describing punk rock as "too hard to sing" in the title track of Whiskeytown's debut album Faithless Street. Whiskeytown was heavily influenced by a number of country-rock pioneers, most notably Gram Parsons. The band quickly gained critical acclaim with the release of their second full-length album, Strangers Almanac, their first major label release. A third album, Pneumonia, was completed in 1999, but record label problems delayed its release. It was eventually released by Lost Highway in 2001, at which time the band was effectively done.

=== Solo career (2000–2004) ===
Adams made his solo debut in 2000, with Heartbreaker (produced by Ethan Johns). Emmylou Harris sang backup on "Oh My Sweet Carolina". Other backing vocals and instruments were provided by Gillian Welch, David Rawlings, Pat Sansone, and Kim Richey as Adams embraced a style more reminiscent of folk music. It was met with considerable critical success, but sales were slow.

Adams released Gold, the follow-up to Heartbreaker, in 2001. It was well received. Adams, however, initially refused to promote the record through radio station meet-and-greets and other music-industry conventions, instead opting for more recording and some live dates. A video was eventually made for the album's first single, "New York, New York". The music video featured Adams performing in front of the city's skyline four days before the September 11 attacks. The video was played often on MTV and VH1 after the attacks and became Adams's breakthrough to mainstream music consumers.

Following the success of Gold, in 2002 Adams was blocked by his label from releasing his choice for a follow-up album. This would be the second time, the first being with Gold; Adams had recorded "the Suicide Handbook" which was rejected on the grounds that it was "too sad". The label opted this time around to cherry pick (without Adams' involvement) from four of Adams' recorded albums it had already dismissed as unreleasable (48 Hours, The Suicide Handbook, The Pinkhearts and The Swedish Sessions) to create Demolition, released in September 2002. Although the album garnered him more critical attention, it failed to sell as well as Gold. The same year, Adams produced Jesse Malin's first album, The Fine Art of Self Destruction, and later worked with Malin to form the punk-rock group The Finger (under the pseudonyms, "Warren Peace" and "Irving Plaza" respectively), who released two E.P.s which were collected together to form We Are Fuck You, released on One Little Indian Records in 2003. He also starred in a Gap advertisement with Willie Nelson, performing a cover of Hank Williams's "Move It on Over".

In May 2002, Adams joined Elton John on CMT Crossroads, which brings together country artists with musicians from other genres. During the show, John referred to Adams as "fabulous one" and spoke of how Heartbreaker inspired him to record Songs from the West Coast, which at the time was his most successful album in several years. Also in 2002, Adams reportedly recorded a cover of The Strokes' debut album Is This It, though it has never been publicly released.

In 2002 and 2003, Adams worked on recording Love Is Hell, intending to release it in 2003. Lost Highway Records deemed that it was not commercially viable and was reluctant to release it, leading Adams to go back to the studio. Two weeks later he returned to Lost Highway with Rock n Roll, which featured guest musicians including Melissa Auf der Maur, Green Day's Billie Joe Armstrong, and Adams's girlfriend at the time, Parker Posey. Adams' songwriting received additional exposure when Joan Baez included his song "In My Time of Need", from his debut release, on her 2003 album Dark Chords on a Big Guitar.

Also released in 2003, Adams formed a punk band called The Finger with Jesse Malin, Colin Burns, and Johnny T. Yerington.^{[1]} The name derived from notorious early/mid-1990s Raleigh, North Carolina rock band Finger, of which Adams was a big fan. This light-hearted project allowed both artists to return to their punk backgrounds (Adams began his music career as singer for The Patty Duke Syndrome and Malin began his career in the hardcore punk band Heart Attack and more famously as the lead singer of D Generation). They began by releasing two EPs: We Are Fuck You and Punk's Dead Let's Fuck which were later collected to form the album We Are Fuck You that was released in 2003.

Adams and Lost Highway Records eventually agreed that the label would release Rock N Roll as well as Love Is Hell, on the condition that Love Is Hell be split into two EP installments. Rock N Roll and Love Is Hell, Pt. 1 were released in November 2003, followed by Love Is Hell, Pt. 2 in December. Both albums were well received by critics, and in May 2004 Love Is Hell was re-released as a full-length album.

Love Is Hell included a cover of Oasis' "Wonderwall", which Adams had previously performed live, and about which Noel Gallagher once said, "I never got my head round this song until I went to [see] Ryan Adams play and he did an amazing cover of it." The song earned Adams a Grammy nomination for "Best Solo Rock Vocal Performance".

While on tour to support Love Is Hell in January 2004, Adams fractured his wrist during a performance at the Royal Court Theatre in Liverpool. Adams fell off the end of the stage into the lowered orchestra pit six feet below, while performing "The Shadowlands". Dates from Adams's European and American tours had to be canceled as a result of his injury.

Adams was featured on the album True Love by Toots and the Maytals, which won the Grammy Award in 2004 for Best Reggae Album, and showcased many notable musicians including Willie Nelson, Eric Clapton, Jeff Beck, Trey Anastasio, Gwen Stefani / No Doubt, Ben Harper, Bonnie Raitt, Manu Chao, The Roots, Keith Richards, Toots Hibbert, Paul Douglas, Jackie Jackson, Ken Boothe, and The Skatalites.

=== The Cardinals (2005–2009) ===
The year 2005 saw Adams join with backing band the Cardinals to produce two albums, Cold Roses and Jacksonville City Nights. Cold Roses, a double album, included backing vocals from Rachael Yamagata on three songs; "Let It Ride", "Cold Roses" and "Friends". His second album of the year, Jacksonville City Nights, featured a duet with Norah Jones on "Dear John". As well as releasing two albums with The Cardinals, Adams released the solo album 29 late in the year.

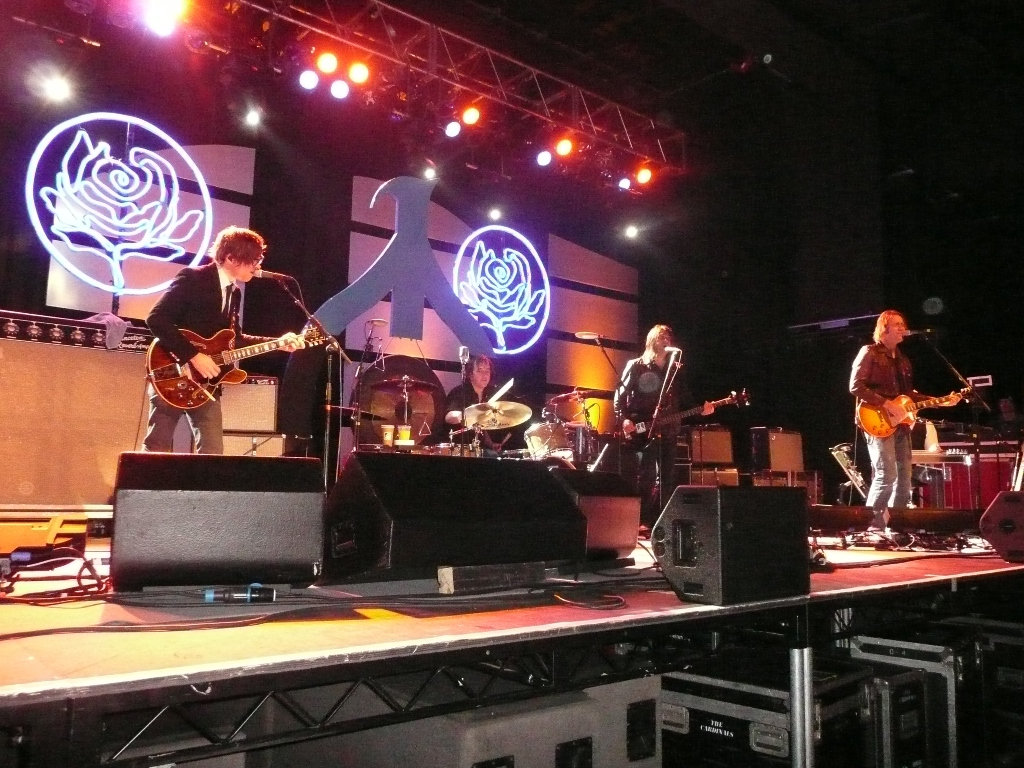
Adams live with The Cardinals in November 2008

Adams befriended Phil Lesh of the Grateful Dead, after first meeting him at the Jammys awards in New York in 2005. The two performed Jerry Garcia and Robert Hunter's Grateful Dead classic, "Wharf Rat". Adams performed at subsequent outings of Phil Lesh and Friends, including a two-night stand at Red Rocks Amphitheatre outside of Denver, Colorado and on New Year's Eve 2005 at the Bill Graham Event Center in San Francisco. Throughout 2006, Lesh's live performances included compositions by Adams, including several from Cold Roses ("Cold Roses", "Let It Ride", and "Magnolia Mountain").

Adams produced Willie Nelson's album Songbird, while he and The Cardinals performed as Nelson's backing band. The album was released in October 2006. He also opened for Nelson at the Hollywood Bowl later that fall, a show that featured Phil Lesh on bass and multiple Grateful Dead songs. Late in 2006, Adams experimented with hip-hop, adding to his web site 18 albums worth of new recordings under various pseudonyms, featuring humorous and nonsensical lyrics, as well as covers of two Bob Dylan songs ("Isis" and "You're a Big Girl Now").

Adams released his ninth album on June 26, 2007, titled Easy Tiger. The album includes many tracks which were debuted during 2006's tours, as well as other older tracks which were previously unreleased.

On October 23, 2007, Adams released Follow the Lights, an EP featuring three new songs: "Follow the Lights","Blue Hotel" and "My Love for You Is Real", along with live studio versions of other previously released songs and a cover of Alice in Chains' "Down In A Hole". Adams also appeared as a guest musician on Cowboy Junkies' 2007 album and DVD Trinity Revisited, a 20th-anniversary re-recording of their classic album The Trinity Session. In 2007 Adams co-wrote a song with Australian singer-songwriter Krista Polvere for her debut record Here Be Dragons; he also played guitar and piano on the album, which was recorded in New York.

A new album with The Cardinals, Cardinology was released on October 28, 2008. Adams has also announced plans to release a book, entitled Infinity Blues. According to Lost Highway chairman, Luke Lewis, there will be an "anthology" release in 2009, featuring several new songs.

On January 14, 2009, Adams announced that he was quitting the Cardinals after their final show on March 20, 2009, at the Fox Theatre in Atlanta. Adams cited hearing loss due to Ménière's disease as well as disillusionment with the music industry, the media and audience behavior as reasons for his decision. He also stated that he has been working on two new books, in addition to Infinity Blues. The second book, released in the fall of 2009, is entitled Hello Sunshine. Preorders of Hello Sunshine were shipped on August 18 by publisher Akashic Books.

=== Post-Cardinals (2009) ===
In May 2009, drummer Brad Pemberton stated that: "everyone was a bit fried, so it was the right time to step back for a minute. I encouraged Ryan to go and get married, and have a life and find some peace; the guy hasn't really slowed down in ten years, and he needed it as much as we did. Ryan and I have shared too much and are too good of friends to not ever do anything again, but I think we all need to do our own thing for a minute." The Cardinals, without Adams, have recorded together alongside Gin Wigmore for her debut album. Adams has dismissed any possibility of a reunion in the near future, saying it wouldn't be right after the death of Cardinals bassist Chris 'Spacewolf' Feinstein.

In August 2009, Adams began posting on the fan-site, Ryan Adams Archive, discussing the possibility of a Whiskeytown reunion, new songs and releasing his many 'unreleased' albums. In August, Adams also began blogging for The Awl. In September 2009, Adams debuted a new song online, entitled "Happy Birthday", and began releasing singles, featuring previously unreleased material, from his new record label, PAX AM.

Casal released a photo-book, Ryan Adams & the Cardinals: A View of Other Windows, in February 2010, documenting his time within the band.

=== PAX AM and return to music (2010–2013) ===
In March 2010, Adams announced a new metal-influenced album, entitled Orion, to be released on his PAX AM label. Orion was released on vinyl only on May 18, 2010, and was sold through the PAX AM online store. According to Adams's Facebook page, he had completed two unreleased albums, Blackhole and Cardinals III/IV, and was recording new albums in both New York City and Los Angeles.

On October 29, 2010, Adams played his first live show since stepping down from the Cardinals in March 2009, at a benefit hosted by Judd Apatow. He was backed by Marshall Vore, Sebastian Steinberg and former Cardinal Jamie Candiloro, who were billed as "The Ryan Adams Band". They debuted three new songs and were joined onstage by Mandy Moore for "Oh My Sweet Carolina".

In November 2010, Adams announced the release of Cardinals III/IV, his twelfth studio album, which was recorded in 2006. This album is his fifth with The Cardinals and was released on December 14, 2010, through PAX AM.

In 2011, Adams announced a European tour, and noted that he was working on a new studio album with producer Glyn Johns.

On April 21, 2011, Adams was the surprise opener for an Emmylou Harris show at the El Rey Theatre in Los Angeles. He performed several new songs, as well as "Oh My Sweet Carolina" with Emmy, a track they recorded for 2000's Heartbreaker.

On June 16, 2011, through his Twitter account, Ryan suggested that his album Blackhole could be released around Christmas.

In the September 2011 issue of Q Magazine, Ryan revealed details of his first solo release since leaving The Cardinals, entitled Ashes & Fire. He also discussed the possibility of releasing a third book, Phoenix, which he says concerns "a loveable rat."

In early 2012, Ryan was nominated for a Brit Award for Best International Male. On June 18, 2012, Adams released a live box set chronicling his return to live performances, entitled Live After Deaf. His album Ashes & Fire was nominated for the 55th Annual Grammy Awards.

On April 21, 2013, Adams released an EP, 7 Minutes in Heaven, with his newly formed punk rock band Pornography, featuring Make Out vocalist Leah Hennessey and frequent collaborator Johnny T. Yerington. In July 2013, Adams collaborated as a producer with rock band Fall Out Boy at his PAX AM Studio, which resulted in Fall Out Boy's PAX AM Days EP. On March 19, 2013, Adams played a live show with a full band for the first time since the Cardinals disbanded. The show was for Noel Gallagher's Teenage Cancer Trust benefit. The venue's website stated that Ryan was playing new songs from a forthcoming album.

=== Self-titled studio album, PAX AM Single Series, 1989 and Prisoner (2014–2018) ===
On July 1, 2014, stories emerged that a self-titled album, Ryan Adams, would be released on September 9, 2014. Since this announcement, Adams has released a 7-inch vinyl EP, entitled 1984 and announced tour dates through mid October 2014. He debuted several new songs from the self-titled album in a series of festival concerts in late July 2014. On September 9, 2014, the self-titled album Ryan Adams was released on PAX-AM records.

In addition to the self-titled album, Adams announced a project he calls the "PAX AM Single Series", with a new seven-inch release each month. Adams stated, "I'm going to release a single every month until I can't do it any more." The first of these releases, the 1984 EP, was released in August 2014 and is described by Adams as, "pay[ing] homage to the halcyon days of the earliest releases from [record labels] Dischord, SST, Touch & Go and their ilk." In 2014 and 2015, Adams continued to release digital singles, with each single being accompanied by at least 2 B-sides. Singles in 2014 included "Jacksonville", "Vampires", and "Do You Laugh When You Lie?", while singles in 2015 included "No Shadow" (featuring actor Johnny Depp, who had previously appeared on his self-titled album), "Blue Light", "I Do Not Feel Like Being Good", "Willow Lane", and "Burn in the Night". Often selling out within minutes of being released through PAX AM's website, the singles remain available for digital download.

On December 5, 2014, "Gimme Something Good", a song from the Ryan Adams album, was nominated for the Grammy Award for Best Rock Song.

On August 5, 2015, Adams announced via Instagram that he was going to cover and release his version of Taylor Swift's 2014 album 1989. He released multiple clips via Twitter and Instagram showcasing his takes on Swift's songs. Adams' 1989 was released on September 21, 2015. It debuted at No. 7 on the US Billboard 200 chart, one position ahead of Swift's 1989, which was in its 48th week on the chart. Adams said in October 2016 that he would never cover another full album again following the recording of 1989.

On December 6, 2016, Adams announced a new album, Prisoner. It was released on PAX AM/Blue Note on February 17, 2017. The album's first single "Do You Still Love Me?" was released on December 7, 2016 and the second single, "To Be Without You" was released on December 23, 2016.

In 2018, Adams released a stand-alone single, "Baby I Love You", and contributed one song, "20th Call of the Day", to the Juliet, Naked soundtrack.

=== Wednesdays, Big Colors, Chris, and further albums (2019–present) ===
In January 2019, Adams announced his plans to release three albums that calendar year. The first, Big Colors, was due to be released April 19 and feature 15 tracks. The second, Wednesdays, was to feature 17 tracks and did not yet have a confirmed release date. The release of all three albums was put on hold after the New York Times broke allegations of sexual misconduct. After a five-month silence, Adams returned in July 2019, posting a soundboard recording of a song titled "I'm Sorry and I Love You". On December 11, 2020, Adams eventually surprise-released Wednesdays, which features "I'm Sorry and I Love You" as well as several tracks originally announced for inclusion on Big Colors. A music video for "I'm Sorry and I Love You" was uploaded to YouTube on December 15, 2020. Its description mentions that Wednesdays is the first in a trilogy of albums, including Big Colors and Chris.

On April 23, 2021, Adams surprise-released "Do Not Disturb" as the lead single from the revised edition of Big Colors. The album was released on June 11, 2021, with a different track listing from the one announced in 2019.

On March 2, 2022, Adams announced his first headlining show since the New York Times article. It sold out within hours and took place at Carnegie Hall on May 14. Additional concerts were announced later in March, with another batch announced in June. On March 25, Adams released Chris as the final installment of the trilogy. It was followed by four other albums: Romeo & Juliet on April 25, FM on July 22, Devolver on September 23, and Nebraska on December 7, a cover of the Bruce Springsteen album of the same name. Devolver was released as a free download along with a statement from Adams thanking his fans for their support. He announced further shows in fall and winter of 2022, followed by a return to the UK in April 2023. On December 26, 2022, Adams released a cover of the Bob Dylan album Blood on the Tracks, and on April 14, 2023, he released a cover of the Oasis album (What's the Story) Morning Glory?, which also included covers of b-sides from that album's singles.

On January 1, 2024, Adams surprise-released four more studio albums: Sword & Stone, Star Sign, Heatwave and 1985, as well as a live version of Prisoner.

== Personal life ==
=== Relationships and health ===
Adams was engaged to singer-songwriter Leona Naess, but the engagement ended in 2003. From 2003 to 2005 Adams dated actress Parker Posey. In 2008, Adams began dating singer-songwriter and actress Mandy Moore. They became engaged in February 2009 and they were married on March 10, 2009, in Savannah, Georgia. On January 23, 2015, Adams and Moore announced in a joint statement that they were separating. The divorce was finalized in June 2016.

In 2007, Adams stated that he does not drink or take drugs. He revealed that he had endured "an extended period of substance abuse" that ended in 2006. He indicated that he routinely snorted heroin mixed with cocaine, and abused alcohol and pills. He beat his addiction with the assistance of his girlfriend at the time, Jessica Joffe, using Valium therapy and occasionally attending twelve-step meetings. In the following years, he made several statements indicating he was "newly sober" and he told TMZ in June 2022 that he had reached nine months of sobriety. He celebrated one year of sobriety with the free release of his album Devolver on September 23, 2022.

In November of 2026 it was reported that he got engaged to musician Kate Farr the previous month after six months of dating.

Adams has Ménière's disease and tinnitus. A flyer advising of Adams' condition is affixed to the first several rows of seats at his concerts, with the admonition for audience members to refrain from taking flash photos or using autofocus assist beams when photographing at his shows. Adams has also openly spoken about experiencing depression and anxiety.

=== Disputes with fans and other artists ===
At a concert in October 2002, at Nashville's Ryman Auditorium, someone in the audience yelled out a request for "Summer of '69", a song by the similarly named Bryan Adams. Adams reacted with a stream of expletives, and ordered the house lights turned on, The Tennessean newspaper reported. He eventually found the fan who made the joke-request, paid him $30 cash as a refund for the show, ordered him to leave, and said he would not play another note until he had left. In a 2014 interview, Ryan Adams denied that the audience-member was asked to leave "for screaming a Bryan Adams song", but rather because the man was drunk: "The reason why the guy was asked to leave by me was because I was doing an a-capella three-piece with Gillian Welch, David Rawlings, and myself of 'Bartering Lines', and in between the quiet parts the guy was screaming." In April 2015, Ryan Adams, who had since become friends with Bryan Adams, played "Summer of '69" at the end of another performance at the Ryman in Nashville, an act described by Rolling Stone as "an olive branch to the city that was once his home".

Adams left an angry message on critic Jim DeRogatis's answering machine, in response to a scathing review DeRogatis gave of an Adams show in 2003.

During filming of the BBC's long-running show Songwriter's Circle, where Adams was joined by American folk-singer Janis Ian and New Zealand's Neil Finn, it was reported that he refused to participate in a number of the songs performed on the night and was generally dismissive of collaborating with the others. The fallout from the show resulted in an online back-and-forth argument between Adams, Ian, and members of the public, who cited Adams's rude behavior and eccentric demeanor toward his colleagues. In August 2017, Adams singled out Father John Misty for criticism, while a month earlier he made derogatory remarks about The Strokes through social media.

In October 2025, Adams ended a show in Melbourne early, later writing on social media that Australia is the "worst country ever" to play in and Australians "the worst people". Days later, he apologized, saying that he overreacted to a heckler and was also bothered by the flash photography because of his Ménière's disease.

=== Harassment allegations ===
On February 13, 2019, The New York Times reported that seven women (including Phoebe Bridgers and ex-wife Mandy Moore) said Adams offered to assist them with their music careers, then pursued the women romantically. They also claimed that Adams retaliated when they spurned his advances, hindering their careers and harassing them in text messages and on social media. The accusations surfaced in the context of the #MeToo movement against sexual harassment. Adams initially denied the accusations but in July 2020, he issued a statement in the Daily Mail apologizing for his actions.

A day after the Times report, singer-songwriters Liz Phair and Karen Elson made statements about their working relationship with Adams. Phair, who had worked with Adams on an unreleased double album, said that while her experience "was nowhere near as personally involving[...]the similarities are upsetting”. Elson said that she had "also had a traumatizing experience with Ryan Adams" but that she was not "quite brave enough yet to speak about [her] specifics".

== Recognition ==
Adams is recognized for his highly prolific songwriting and a singing style that resembles that of a country rocker, even though he played punk rock in the early part of his career. Adams has frequently experimented with different genres, although for the major part of his career his musical style has been alternative rock. He is also one of the few artists to emerge from the alt-country scene into mainstream commercial success.

His musical style and dynamism has been praised by various artists like Frank Turner, Elton John, Willie Nelson, Taylor Swift, Norah Jones, Wesley Schultz, Jared Followill and Noel Gallagher. American author Stephen King is historically a fan of Adams, stating in 2007, "I won't say Adams is the best North American singer songwriter since Neil Young... but I won't say he isn't either".

== Discography ==
=== Solo ===
- Heartbreaker (2000)
- Gold (2001)
- Demolition (2002)
- Rock n Roll (2003)
- Love Is Hell (2004)
- 29 (2005)
- Orion (2010)
- Ashes & Fire (2011)
- Ryan Adams (2014)
- Prisoner (2017)
- Wednesdays (2020)
- Big Colors (2021)
- Chris (2022)
- Romeo & Juliet (2022)
- FM (2022)
- Devolver (2022)
- Sword & Stone (2024)
- Star Sign (2024)
- Heatwave (2024)
- 1985 (2024)
- Blackhole (2024)
- Another Wednesday (2025)
- Self Portrait (2025)
- The Suicide Handbook (2026)
- Animal (2027)

=== With The Cardinals ===
- Cold Roses (2005)
- Jacksonville City Nights (2005)
- Easy Tiger (2007) (CD billed as Solo Record)
- Follow the Lights (2007), EP
- Cardinology (2008)
- III/IV (2010)
- Class Mythology (2011), EP

=== Cover albums ===
- 1989 (2015) (Taylor Swift)
- Nebraska (2022) (Bruce Springsteen)
- Blood on the Tracks (2022) (Bob Dylan)
- Morning Glory (2023) (Oasis)
- Changes (2025) (Various Artists - live w/string overdubs)

=== Live albums ===
- Live After Deaf (2012)
- Live at Carnegie Hall (Ryan Adams album) (2015)
- Ten Songs from Live at Carnegie Hall (2015)
- Return to Carnegie Hall (2023)
- Prisoners (2024) (live w/string overdubs)
- Another Wednesday (2025) (live w/string overdubs)

== Bibliography ==
- Sad American Mythology (2009)
- Infinity Blues (2009)
- Hello Sunshine (2009)
- Negative Space (2023)
- 100 Problems (2023)
- The Greatest Movie Ever Made (2025)
- Kill Yourself Tomorrow, Brenda (2025)

== Awards and nominations ==
| Award | Year | Nominee(s) | Category | Result | Ref. |
|---|---|---|---|---|---|
| Grammy Awards | 2002 | Gold | Best Rock Album | Nominated | |
| Grammy Awards | 2002 | "New York, New York" | Best Male Rock Vocal Performance | Nominated | |
| Grammy Awards | 2002 | "Lovesick Blues" | Best Male Country Vocal Performance | Nominated | |
| Grammy Awards | 2005 | "Wonderwall" | Best Solo Rock Vocal Performance | Nominated | |
| Grammy Awards | 2015 | Ryan Adams | Best Rock Album | Nominated | |
| Grammy Awards | 2015 | "Gimme Something Good" | Best Rock Song | Nominated | |
| Grammy Awards | 2015 | "Gimme Something Good" | Best Rock Performance | Nominated | |
| iHeartRadio Music Awards | 2016 | 1989 | Best Cover | Nominated | |
| NME Awards | 2002 | Himself | Best Solo Artist | Nominated | |
| NME Awards | 2003 | Himself | Best Solo Artist | Won | |
| NME Awards | 2004 | Himself | Best Solo Artist | Won | |

| Year | Association | Category | Nominated work | Result |
|---|---|---|---|---|
| 2001 | Shortlist Music Prize | Album of the Year | Heartbreaker | Nominated |
| 2004 | Denmark GAFFA Awards | Best Foreign Songwriter | Himself | Nominated |
| 2007 | Q Awards | Q Merit Awards | Himself | Won |
| 2008 | NME Awards USA | Best American Alternative/Independent Solo Artist | Himself | Nominated |
| 2012 | Brit Awards | International Male Solo Artist | Himself | Nominated |
| 2013 | O Music Awards | Must Follow Artist on Twitter | Himself | Nominated |
| 2017 | Americana Music Awards | Song of the Year | "To Be Without You" | Nominated |
