= PAX AM =

American record label

Pax Americana Recording Company
- Founded: 2004
- Founder: Ryan Adams
- Country of origin: United States
- Official website: paxamrecords.com

Pax Americana Recording Company, also known as PAX-AM, is a record label founded by Ryan Adams. Established in 2004, the label released certain of Adams’ then-unpublished demo recordings. Following Adams' fulfillment of a recording contract with Lost Highway Records in 2008, the PAX-AM label became the artist's exclusive venue for musical releases. In early November 2010, the label re-launched its webpage and announced platforms for retail and the release of music by additional artists.

== History ==
Adams' idea for 'PAX-AM' records germinated in high school. Adams states: "When I was in high school, I used to pass out these cassettes that said Pax-Am Records. That was my imaginary label. They were little compilations where I played all the instruments — one track would be like a Pet Shop Boys-sounding band, another would be a metal-sounding band or a surf-rock band. I had fake names for these groups, but it was all totally me. Nobody cared, of course."

== Releases ==
001 "California" [EP] 2 x 7" yellow vinyl (2004)
002 "The Rescue Blues" [EP] 2 x 7" clear vinyl (2004)
003 "Now That You're Gone"/"If I Am A Stranger" [Single] 7" clear vinyl (2004)
004 "Thank You"/"Evergreen" [Single] 7" Black vinyl (came with Hello Sunshine pre-orders) (2009)
005 "Oblivion"/"People Need Sunlight" [Single] 7" pink vinyl (2009)
006 Orion [LP] 12" clear vinyl (2010)
007 "Valhalla"/"Crossing Foggy Mountains" [Single] 7" black vinyl (2010)
008 III/IV [LP] 12" red and blue vinyl (2010)
009 Class Mythology [EP] 2 x 7" orange and yellow vinyl (Record Store Day exclusive release) (2011)
010 "Empty Room / Nutshell" [Single] 7" black vinyl (available on 2011 European tour) (2011)
011 Ashes & Fire LP/CD (released in collaboration with Capitol Records) (2011)
012 "Come Home"/"Starsign" [Single] 7" black vinyl (available on 2011 US tour) (2011)
013 "Petal In A Rainstorm" - one song flexi (came with Deluxe Pre-orders of Ashes And Fire) (2011)
013 "Do I Wait"/"The Darkness" [Single] 7" black vinyl (Black Friday Record Store Day) (second release numbered 013) (2011)
014 Live After Deaf - LP1 - June 7, 2011 - At The Cork Opera House, Cork, Ireland [LP] 12" black vinyl (2012)
015 Live After Deaf - LP2 - June 8, 2011 - At The Olympia Theatre, Dublin, Ireland [LP] 12" black vinyl (2012)
016 Live After Deaf - LP3 - June 1, 2011 - At Cirkus, Stockholm, Sweden [LP] 12" black vinyl (2012)
017 Live After Deaf - LP4 - June 11, 2011 - At Folketeatret, Oslo, Norway [LP] 12" black vinyl (2012)
018 Live After Deaf - LP5 - June 13, 2011 - At The Concert House, Malmo, Sweden [LP] 12" black vinyl (2012)
019 Live After Deaf - LP6 - June 14, 2011 - At Koncerhauset, Copenhagen, Denmark [LP] 12" black vinyl (2012)
020 Live After Deaf - LP7 - June 16, 2011 - At Aula Magna, Lisbon, Portugal [LP] 12" black vinyl (2012)
021 Live After Deaf - LP8 - June 17, 2011 - At Teatro Sa Da Bandeira, Porto, Portugal [LP] 12" black vinyl (2012)
022 Live After Deaf - LP9 - June 19, 2011 - At Barbican, London, United Kingdom - Night 1 [LP] 12" black vinyl (2012)
023 Live After Deaf - LP10 - June 20, 2011 - At Barbican, London, United Kingdom - Night 2 [LP] 12" black vinyl (2012)
024 Live After Deaf - LP11 - June 22, 2011 - At Dome, Brighton, United Kingdom [LP] 12" black vinyl (2012)
025 Live After Deaf - LP12 - June 23, 2011 - At Bridgewater Hall, Manchester, United Kingdom [LP] 12" black vinyl (2012)
026 Live After Deaf - LP13 - June 25, 2011 - At Academy, Glasgow, United Kingdom [LP] 12" black vinyl (2012)
027 Live After Deaf - LP14 - June 26, 2011 - At Oxford New Theatre, Oxford, United Kingdom [LP] 12" black vinyl (2012)
028 Live After Deaf - LP15 - June 28, 2011 - At Concertgebouw, Amsterdam, Netherlands [LP] 12" black vinyl (2012)
029 Live After Deaf 15 LP box-set (2012)
030 "Heartbreak A Stranger"/"Black Sheets Of Rain" [Single] 7" blue vinyl (Record Store Day exclusive release) (2012)
032 Pornography - 7 Minutes In Heaven [Single] 7" Unmastered (Record Store Day exclusive release) (2013)
034 "Gimme Something Good" (b/w "Aching for More") [Single] 7" black vinyl and UK-only gold vinyl (2014)
035 1984 [EP] 7" black vinyl (2014)
037 Fall Out Boy - PAX AM Days [EP] 2 x 7" black vinyl (2013)
039 Ryan Adams LP/CD black vinyl (2014)
040 "Jacksonville" (b/w "I Keep Running"/"Walkedypants") [Single] 7" black vinyl (2014)
041 "Vampires" (b/w "Magic Flag" and "Clown Asylum"/"Suburbia") [Single] 7" red with black streaks vinyl (plays at 33 1/3 RPM) (2014)
041 Jenny Lewis - "Just One of the Guys"/"You Can't Outrun 'Em" (aka "PAX AM Sessions") [Single] 7" green vinyl (Black Friday Record Store exclusive release) (second release number 041) (2014)
042 "Do You Laugh When You Lie?" (b/w "By the Way"/"I'm in Love with You") [Single] 7" black vinyl (2014)
043 "No Shadow" (b/w "It's In My Head"/"Stoned Alone") [Single] 7" black vinyl (2015)
044 "Blue Light" (b/w "On My Life"/"I Lost My Fucking Mind") [Single] 7" black vinyl (2015)
045 "I Do Not Feel Like Being Good" (b/w "How Much Light"/"In The Dark") [Single] 7" black vinyl (2015)
046 "Burn In The Night" (b/w "Cop City"/"Look In The Mirror") [Single] 7" black vinyl (2015)
047 "Willow Lane" (b/w "Yes or Run"/"Red Hot Blues") [Single] 7" black vinyl (2015)
048 Mike Viola - "Stairway to Paradise" (2015) [Single] 7" vinyl
049 "Live at Carnegie Hall" LP/CD (2015)
051 "Come Pick Me Up (Alternate Take)" (b/w "When The Rope Gets Tight") [Single] 7" black vinyl (2015)
057 "1989" LP/CD (2015)
058 "Prisoner" LP/CD (2017)
059 "Live at Rough Trade" LP/CD
060 "Baby I Love You" (b/w "Was I Wrong") [Single] 7" pink vinyl (2018)
066 "Wednesdays" LP/CD (2021)
066 "It's Not That Kind Of Night" (b/w "Sunflowers") [Single] 7" black vinyl (2021)
066 "Red And Orange Special" (b/w "Somewhere It's Spring") [Single] 7" black vinyl (2021)
067 "Big Colors" LP/CD (2021)
067 "Anybody Evil" (b/w "The Opposite of Love") [Single] 7" black vinyl (2021)
068 "Chris" LP/CD (2023)
069 "Romeo & Juliet" LP/CD (2023)
070 "FM" LP/CD (2023)
071 "Devolver" LP/CD (2023)

Digital releases only:
001 "Lost and Found"/"Go Ahead and Rain" [digi-single] (2009)
002 "Allumette"/"What Color is Rain" [digi-single] (2009)
003 "Tomorrowland"/"Disco Queen [digi-single](2009)
