= Grace Potter and the Nocturnals discography =

This is the discography for American rock band Grace Potter and the Nocturnals.

== Albums ==
=== Studio albums ===
List of studio albums, with selected details and chart positions
Title	Details	Peak chart positions				
Title	Details	US	US Rock	US Heat.	US Digital	US Taste.
Nothing but the Water	Released: September 20, 2005; Label: Grace Potter; Format: CD	—	—	—	—	—
This Is Somewhere	Released: August 7, 2007; Label: Hollywood; Format: CD, DI	119	—	1	—	—
Grace Potter and the Nocturnals	Released: June 8, 2010; Label: Hollywood; Format: DI, LP, CD+	19	3	—	9	6
The Lion the Beast the Beat	Released: June 12, 2012; Label: Hollywood; Format: CD, LP, DI	17	7	—	10	2
"—" denotes a recording that did not chart or was not released in that territory.

=== Live albums ===
List of live albums, with selected details
Title	Details
Live Oh Five	Released: 2005; Label: Grace Potter Music; Format: CD
Live in Skowhegan	Released: December 21, 2008; Label: Hollywood; Format: CD
Live from the Legendary Sun Studio	Released: April 21, 2012; Label: Hollywood; Format: CD, LP
Vaulturnal Volume 1: August 19, 2013 Tanglewood, Lenox, MA	Released: November 25, 2014; Label: Hollywood; Format: CD, digital

== Singles ==
List of singles, with selected chart positions, showing year released and album name
Title	Year	Peak chart positions						Certifications	Album
Title	Year	US	US Adult Pop	US AAA	US Rock	US Rock Digital	CAN	Certifications	Album
"Ah, Mary"	2007	—	—	12	—	—	—		This Is Somewhere
"Apologies"	2007	—	—	—	—	—	—		This Is Somewhere
"Ain't No Time"	2007	—	—	24	—	—	—		This Is Somewhere
"Tiny Light"	2010	—	—	17	—	—	—		Grace Potter and the Nocturnals
"Medicine"	2010	—	—	—	—	—	—		Grace Potter and the Nocturnals
"Paris (Ooh La La)"	2010	—	20	16	—	19	—		Grace Potter and the Nocturnals
"Please Come Home for Christmas"	2011	—	—	—	—	37	—		Christmas with Grace Potter and the Nocturnals
"Never Go Back"	2012	—	—	8	—	—	—		The Lion the Beast the Beat
"Stars"	2012	95	27	15	13	14	86	RIAA: Gold	The Lion the Beast the Beat
"Runaway"	2012	—	—	28	—	—	—		The Lion the Beast the Beat
"—" denotes releases that did not chart

== Other songs ==
- Almost Alice (2010) "White Rabbit" (Jefferson Airplane cover)
- ZZ Top: A Tribute from Friends (2011) "Tush"
- A Big Day at the Fair (2017) "All You Need Is Love" (The Beatles cover)
- The Lone Ranger: Wanted (2013) - "Devil's Train"

== Music videos ==
List of music videos
Title	Year	Director
"Tiny Light"	2010	Paul Minor
"Paris (Ooh La La)"	2010	Paul Minor
"You and Tequila" (Kenny Chesney with Grace Potter)	2011	Shaun Silva
"Never Go Back"	2012	Isaac Rentz
"Stars"	2012	Philip Andelman
"Wild Child" (Kenny Chesney with Grace Potter)	2015	Shaun Silva
