= VH1 Divas =

Concert series

VH1 hosted the first annual VH1 Divas concert in 1998. VH1 Divas Live was created to support the channel's Save the Music Foundation and subsequent concerts in the series have also benefited that foundation. The VH1 Divas concerts were a follow-up to the channel's annual VH1 Honors benefit concert that ran from 1994 to 1997, airing annually from 1998 to 2004. After a five-year hiatus, the series returned in 2009 with a younger-skewed revamp. In 2010 the concert saluted the troops and in 2011 it celebrated soul music, doubling the previous year's ratings. After a dance music-focused 2012 edition aired live from the Shrine Auditorium in Los Angeles on December 16, 2012, the show took another hiatus before being revived on December 5, 2016, at the Kings Theatre in Brooklyn, New York with a holiday theme and achieved its highest ratings in over a decade.

== VH1 Divas Live ==
VH1 Divas Live

Live album by VH1 Divas Live
- Released: October 6, 1998
- Recorded: April 14, 1998
- Genres: Pop; R&B; soul; rock; country
- Labels: Epic; VH1

VH1 Divas Live chronology
VH1 Divas Live (1998)	VH1 Divas Live/99 (1999)

VH1 Divas Live: An Honors Concert For The VH1 Save The Music Foundation aired live on April 14, 1998.

=== Summary ===
The first "VH1 Divas" show, at New York City's Beacon Theatre, featured international music stars Aretha Franklin, Celine Dion, Gloria Estefan, Mariah Carey and Shania Twain. In a guest appearance, singer-songwriter Carole King led the performers through versions of her songs "You've Got a Friend" and "(You Make Me Feel Like) A Natural Woman."

=== Headliners ===
- Aretha Franklin
- Celine Dion
- Gloria Estefan
- Mariah Carey
- Shania Twain

=== Guest performer ===
- Carole King

=== Presenters ===
- Jennifer Aniston
- Joan Osborne
- Patricia Arquette
- Teri Hatcher
- Sarah McLachlan
- Sarah Jessica Parker
- Susan Sarandon

The show was produced by Grammys producer Ken Ehrlich, directed by Michael Simon and written by producer/writer Martin Lewis.

=== Show sequence ===
- Mariah Carey – "My All"
- Mariah Carey – "Make It Happen"
- Gloria Estefan – "Turn The Beat Around"
- Gloria Estefan – "Heaven's What I Feel"
- Gloria Estefan – Megamix:
  - "Dr. Beat"
  - "Conga"
  - "Rhythm Is Gonna Get You"
  - "1-2-3"
  - "Get On Your Feet"
- Shania Twain – "Man! I Feel Like a Woman!"
- Shania Twain – "You're Still the One"
- Aretha Franklin – "A Rose Is Still a Rose" – Not released on the live album or home video
- Aretha Franklin and Mariah Carey – "Chain of Fools"
- Aretha Franklin – "Here We Go Again" – Not released on the live album or home video
- Celine Dion – "River Deep, Mountain High"
- Celine Dion and Carole King – "The Reason"
- Celine Dion – "My Heart Will Go On"
- Carole King – "It's Too Late" – Not aired in television broadcast, nor released on the live album or home video
- Carole King, Celine Dion, Gloria Estefan and Shania Twain – "You've Got a Friend"
- The Divas – "A Natural Woman"
- The Divas – "Testimony" – Shortened in the home video release

=== Performances on the album and home video release ===
- "My All" – 05:45
- "Make It Happen" – 05:29
- "Turn The Beat Around" – 05:07
- "Heaven's What I Feel" – 04:54
- "Dr. Beat"/"Conga"/"Rhythm Is Gonna Get You"/"1-2-3"/"Get on Your Feet" – 03:32
- "Man! I Feel Like a Woman" – 03:55
- "You're Still the One" – 03:33
- "Chain of Fools" – 04:24
- "River Deep, Mountain High" – 05:12
- "The Reason" – 05:59
- "My Heart Will Go On" – 04:41
- "You've Got a Friend" – 05:29
- "A Natural Woman" – 05:15
- "Testimony" – 09:47

=== Charts ===
Chart	Position
U.S. Billboard 200	21
Canadian Albums Chart	12
French Syndicat National de l'Édition Phonographique	7
German Albums (Offizielle Top 100)	39
Netherlands MegaCharts	7
Norwegian VG-lista	9
New Zealand Recorded Music NZ	10

=== Certifications ===
Region	Certification	Certified units/sales
Argentina (CAPIF)	Gold	30,000^{^}
Australia (ARIA)	Platinum	70,000^{^}
Belgium (BRMA)	Gold	25,000^{*}
Canada (Music Canada)	Platinum	100,000^{^}
France (SNEP)	Gold	100,000^{*}
Spain (Promusicae)	Platinum	100,000^{^}
Switzerland (IFPI Switzerland)	Gold	25,000^{^}
United States (RIAA)	Gold	500,000^{^}
United States (RIAA) DVD	Platinum	100,000^{^}
^{*} Sales figures based on certification alone.^{^} Shipments figures based on certification alone.

=== Reviews ===
- Pareles, Jon (April 16, 1998). "There Are Divas, and There Are Divas". The New York Times.
- All Music review

=== Musician credits ===
(in order of appearance)

- Mariah Carey's band: Randy Jackson – bass; Gigi Gonaway – drums; Vernon Black – guitar; Andrew Sherman – keyboards; Michael Mcknight – programmer; Juliet Haffner – viola; Laura Seaton, Andre E. Stien, Peter M. Weimar – violins; Marquino Brazil – percussion; Melonie Daniels, Nicki Richards, Sherry Mcghee, Mary Ann Tatum – background vocals
- Gloria Estefan's band: Jorge Casa – bass; Clay Ostwald – keyboards; Tim Mitchell, René Toledo – guitars; Olin Burgos – drums; Randy Barlow – trombone and trumpet; Teddy Mulet, Douglas Michaels – trumpet; Kenny Anderson, Tom Timko – saxes/reeds; Rita Quintero, Juan "Chieto" Quiñonez, George Noriega, Donna Allen – vocals
- Shania Twain's band: Brent Barcus – guitar; Andrew Cichon – bass; James Blair – drums; Cory Churko, Allison Cornell – mandolin and fiddle; Marc D. Muller – pedal steel; Hardy Hempill – keyboards
- Aretha Franklin's band: H.B. Barnum – conductor; David Rokeach – drums; Francisco Centeno – bass; Teddy Richards – guitar; Richard Gibbs – piano; Darryll Houston – organ; Byron Strippling, Glenn Drews, Jorge Arciniega – trumpet; Robert Trowers, Larry Farrell, Keith O'Quinn – trombone; Lawrence Feldman, Dave Tofani, Ernie Fields Jr., Roger Rosenberg – sax; Mae Kohn, Diana Madison, William Moore – background vocals; Jaqui Whitman – tambourine; Michael Beardon – keyboards; Joe Passaro – percussion
- Celine Dion's band: Claude "Mégo" Lemay – keyboards; Dominique Messier – drums; Ives "Ivo" Frulla – keyboards; André Coutu – guitars; Paul Picard – percussion; Élise Dugay - background vocals and tin whistle; Terry Bradford, Julie LeBlanc – background vocals

Aretha's band was used for her duet with Mariah Carey ("Chain of Fools") and the finale ("A Natural Woman" and "Testimony").

== VH1 Divas Live/99 ==
VH1 Divas Live/99

Live album by VH1 Divas Live
- Released: November 1999
- Recorded: April 13, 1999
- Genres: Pop; R&B; Rock; Soul
- Length: 73:00
- Label: VH1

VH1 Divas Live chronology
VH1 Divas Live (1998)	VH1 Divas Live/99 (1999)	VH1 Divas Las Vegas (2002)

VH1 Divas Live/99: An Honors Concert For The VH1 Save The Music Foundation aired live on April 13, 1999.

=== Headliners ===
- Whitney Houston
- Tina Turner
- Cher
- Brandy

=== Special guest performer ===
- Elton John

=== Guest performers ===
- Mary J. Blige
- Chaka Khan
- Faith Hill
- Treach
- LeAnn Rimes

=== Presenters ===
- Ana Gasteyer
- Sarah Michelle Gellar
- Elizabeth Hurley
- Ashley Judd
- Cheri Oteri
- Gloria Reuben
- Molly Shannon
- Claudia Schiffer
- Celebrities shown in the audience included Hugh Grant, Donald Trump, Susan Lucci, Star Jones, Martha Stewart, Paul Shaffer, RuPaul and Caroline Rhea. Paul Gorman was also present.

=== Show sequence ===
- Tina Turner – "The Best"
- Tina Turner – "Let's Stay Together" – Not released on CD or DVD
- Tina Turner and Elton John – "The Bitch Is Back"
- Tina Turner, Elton John, and Cher – "Proud Mary"
- Elton John – "I'm Still Standing"
- Elton John and LeAnn Rimes – "Written in the Stars" – Not released on CD or DVD
- LeAnn Rimes – "How Do I Live"
- Elton John – "Like Father Like Son" – Not released on CD or DVD
- Cher – "If I Could Turn Back Time"
- Cher – "Believe" – Not released on CD or DVD
- Brandy – "Have You Ever?"/ Almost Doesn't Count
- Brandy and Faith Hill – "(Everything I Do) I Do It for You"
- Faith Hill – "This Kiss"
- Whitney Houston – "It's Not Right, But It's Okay" – Not released on CD or DVD; audio version now available for download on iTunes
- Whitney Houston and Mary J. Blige – "Ain't No Way"
- Whitney Houston and Treach – "My Love Is Your Love" – Not released on CD or DVD; audio version now available for download on iTunes
- Whitney Houston – "I Will Always Love You"
- Whitney Houston and Chaka Khan – "I'm Every Woman"
- Whitney Houston, Chaka Khan, Faith Hill, Brandy, LeAnn Rimes, and Mary J. Blige – "I'm Every Woman (reprise)"

=== Performances on the CD, VHS, and DVD release ===
- Tina Turner – "The Best"
- Tina Turner and Elton John – "The Bitch Is Back"
- Tina Turner, Elton John, and Cher – "Proud Mary"
- Cher – "If I Could Turn Back Time"
- LeAnn Rimes – "How Do I Live"
- Elton John – "I'm Still Standing"
- Brandy – "Have You Ever?"/"Almost Doesn't Count"
- Brandy and Faith Hill – "(Everything I Do) I Do It for You"
- Faith Hill – "This Kiss"
- Whitney Houston and Mary J. Blige – "Ain't No Way"
- Whitney Houston – "I Will Always Love You"
- Whitney Houston and Chaka Khan – "I'm Every Woman"
- Whitney Houston, Chaka Khan, Faith Hill, Brandy, Mary J. Blige, and LeAnn Rimes – "I'm Every Woman (reprise)"

=== Charts and certification ===
Chart (2000)	Provider	Peak position	Certification
Australian Albums Chart	ARIA	11	Gold
Austrian Albums Chart	Media Control	43	
French Albums Chart	SNEP/IFOP	42	
Dutch Albums Chart	IFPI	41	
German Top 100 Albums	Media Control	60	
Swiss Top 100 Albums	Media Control	14	
U.S. Billboard 200	Billboard	90	Gold (CD) / Gold (DVD)

== VH1 Divas 2000: A Tribute to Diana Ross ==
VH1 Divas 2000: A Tribute to Diana Ross – An Honors Concert for the VH1 Save the Music Foundation was the first of three concerts in the series not aired live. It was recorded on April 9, 2000 at New York's Madison Square Garden and first aired on April 11, 2000. Diana Ross requested the concert be recorded as time constraints for the airing of commercials would not allow enough time for her to change costumes. The well-received show took a mammoth 6 hours to record. This special also marked the re-introduction of Lynda Laurence and Scherrie Payne as Supremes, who were touring with Diana Ross. Laurence and Payne were Supremes during the 1970s.

The concert was never released on CD or DVD. Two of the songs were released as b-sides of singles from Mariah Carey and Destiny's Child.

=== Headliners ===
- Diana Ross
- Mariah Carey
- Donna Summer
- Faith Hill

=== Guest performers ===
- Scherrie Payne
- Lynda Laurence
- Destiny's Child
- RuPaul

=== Presenters ===
- Angela Bassett
- Ana Gasteyer
- Cheri Oteri
- Molly Shannon
- Hilary Swank

=== Show sequence ===
- Mariah Carey – "Love Hangover/Heartbreaker (Remix)" – Audio released on Mariah's single "Can't Take That Away"
- Donna Summer – "Reflections"
- Faith Hill – "Breathe"
- Faith Hill – "Love Child"
- Donna Summer – "Bad Girls"
- Donna Summer – "Love Is The Healer"
- Mariah Carey – "Can't Take That Away (Mariah's Theme)" – Audio released on the 25th Anniversary edition of Mariah's "Rainbow" Album
- Faith Hill – "What's In It For Me"
- RuPaul – "I'm Coming Out"
- Destiny's Child – "Say My Name"
- Destiny's Child – "Upside Down" – Audio released on Destiny's Child single "Jumpin', Jumpin'"
- Diana Ross – "Touch Me In The Morning"
- Diana Ross – "Endless Love"
- Diana Ross – "The Best Years Of My Life"
- Diana Ross & The Supremes – "You Keep Me Hangin' On"
- Diana Ross & The Supremes – "Love Is Like an Itching in My Heart"
- Diana Ross and Mariah Carey – Medley: "Baby Love" and "Stop! In the Name of Love"
- The Divas – "Ain't No Mountain High Enough"
- Diana Ross – "I Will Survive"

== VH1 Divas Live: The One and Only Aretha Franklin ==
The event occurred on April 10, 2001, and was released on CD/DVD in 2017 by MVD Visual.

=== Headliners ===
- Aretha Franklin
- Marc Anthony
- Mary J. Blige
- Backstreet Boys
- Celia Cruz
- Nelly Furtado
- Jill Scott
- Kid Rock

=== Guest performers ===
- Bishop Paul Morton & Choir
- James Carter
- Ron Carter
- Herbie Hancock
- Roy Haynes
- Russell Malone
- Clark Terry
- Stevie Wonder

=== Presenters ===
- Pamela Anderson
- Lorraine Bracco
- Drea de Matteo
- Edie Falco
- Janet Jackson
- Aida Turturro
- Sigourney Weaver
- Renée Zellweger

=== Show sequence ===
- Aretha Franklin – "I Can't Turn You Loose"
- Aretha Franklin and Backstreet Boys – "Chain Of Fools"
- Aretha Franklin – "Ain't No Way"
- Marc Anthony and Celia Cruz – "Quimbara" – Not released on CD or DVD
- Jill Scott – "(You Make Me Feel Like A) Natural Woman"
- Jill Scott – "A Long Walk"
- Aretha Franklin – "Think"
- Nelly Furtado – "I'm Like a Bird" – Not released on CD or DVD
- Mary J. Blige – "Day Dreaming"
- Mary J. Blige and Aretha Franklin – "Do Right Woman, Do Right Man"
- Aretha Franklin – "Nessun Dorma"
- Aretha Franklin with Herbie Hancock, Clark Terry, Ron Carter, Roy Haynes, James Carter, and Russell Malone – Mumbles – Not released on CD or DVD
- Aretha Franklin and Kid Rock – "Rock Steady"
- Aretha Franklin with Bishop Paul Morton & Choir – "Precious Memories"
- Aretha Franklin – "Respect"
- Aretha Franklin, Mary J. Blige, Jill Scott, Celia Cruz, Nelly Furtado, Backstreet Boys, Stevie Wonder, Marc Anthony, Herbie Hancock, Clark Terry, Ron Carter, Roy Haynes, James Carter, Russell Malone, and Aretha Franklin's Band – "Freeway Of Love" – Only released on DVD
- Aretha Franklin and Willa Ward – "Weeping May Endure For A Night"/"Surely God Is Able" – Not broadcast or released

== VH1 Divas Las Vegas ==
VH1 Divas Las Vegas

Live album by VH1 Divas Live
- Released: October 22, 2002
- Recorded: May 23, 2002
- Genres: Pop; R&B/soul; rock; Country
- Label: VH1

VH1 Divas Live chronology
VH1 Divas Live/2000 a Tribute to Diana Ross' (2000)	VH1 Divas Las Vegas (2001)

VH1 Divas Las Vegas: An Honors Concert For The VH1 Save The Music Foundation aired live from the MGM Grand Las Vegas on May 23, 2002. For the first time, Divas Live broadcast from a city other than New York. This time around, Las Vegas played host city to the fifth Divas concert.

After being invited by Whitney Houston in 1999, an appearance that gave her big publicity worldwide, Mary J. Blige asked her friend to join her on Divas three years later to perform together her song "Rainy Dayz".

A CD/DVD of the concert was released later that year, but not all the performances or performers (most notably those of co-headliner Mary J. Blige) were included, due to various record label issues.

=== Host ===
- Ellen DeGeneres

=== Announcer ===
- Wayne Newton

=== Headliners ===
- Cher
- Céline Dion
- Dixie Chicks
- Mary J. Blige
- Shakira

=== Guest performers ===
- Anastacia
- Whitney Houston
- Cyndi Lauper
- Stevie Nicks
- Special diva guitarist Meredith Brooks

=== Show sequence ===
- Ellen DeGeneres – "Shoop" – Not released on CD or DVD
- Céline Dion and Anastacia – "You Shook Me All Night Long"
- Cher – "Believe"
- Cher – "Song for the Lonely"
- Cher and Cyndi Lauper – "If I Could Turn Back Time" – Not released on CD or DVD
- Dixie Chicks – "Long Time Gone" – Not released on CD or DVD
- Shakira – "Underneath Your Clothes"
- Mary J. Blige and Whitney Houston – "Rainy Dayz" – Not released on CD or DVD
- Mary J. Blige – "No More Drama" – Not released on CD or DVD
- Dixie Chicks – "Wide Open Spaces" – Not released on CD or DVD
- Dixie Chicks and Stevie Nicks – "Landslide"
- Anastacia – "One Day in Your Life"
- Mary J. Blige and Shakira – "Love Is A Battlefield" – Not released on CD or DVD
- Céline Dion – "I'm Alive"
- Céline Dion – "A New Day Has Come"
- Elvis Tribute Finale Medley:
  - Anastacia – "Jailhouse Rock"
  - Dixie Chicks – "That's All Right (Mama)" – Not released on CD or DVD
  - Shakira – "Always on My Mind"
  - Mary J. Blige – "Blue Suede Shoes" – Not released on CD or DVD
  - Stevie Nicks – "Wear My Ring Around Your Neck" – Not released on CD or DVD
  - Cher – "Heartbreak Hotel"
  - Céline Dion- "Can't Help Falling in Love"
- The Divas – "You Shook Me All Night Long (reprise)" – Not released on CD or DVD

== VH1 Divas Duets ==
VH1 Divas Duets: An Honors Concert For The VH1 Save The Music Foundation aired live from the MGM Grand Las Vegas on May 22, 2003.

=== Summary ===
Chaka Khan, Beyoncé, Lisa Marie Presley, Whitney Houston, Celine Dion, Mary J. Blige, Jewel, Ashanti, Sharon Osbourne, Aisha Tyler, Stevie Wonder, Pat Benatar, Shania Twain, Bobby Brown and the Isley Brothers joined host Queen Latifah when "VH1 Divas Duets: A Benefit Concert for the VH1 Save the Music Foundation" aired live from the MGM Grand in Las Vegas on Thursday, May 22 at 9:00pm (ET/PT)/8:00pm CT. Tarralyn Ramsey was the winner of VH!'s reality competition Born to Diva and performed on stage with the Divas as well.

The concert was never released on CD or DVD.

=== Host and performer ===
- Queen Latifah

=== Headliners ===
- Beyoncé
- Jewel
- Lisa Marie Presley
- Chaka Khan
- Mary J. Blige
- Ashanti
- Whitney Houston

=== Guest performers ===
- Pat Benatar
- Céline Dion
- Bobby Brown
- The Isley Brothers
- Shania Twain
- Stevie Wonder
- Born to Diva winner Tarralyn Ramsey

=== Presenters ===
- Sharon Osbourne
- Aisha Tyler

=== Show sequence ===
- Queen Latifah – "When You're Good To Latifah"
- Beyoncé and Jewel – "Proud Mary"
- Céline Dion – "Have You Ever Been In Love"
- Chaka Khan – Medley: "I Feel For You"/"I'm Every Woman"
- Mary J. Blige – Medley: "Real Love"/"Love No Limit"/"Family Affair"
- The Isley Brothers and Ashanti – "Who's That Lady?"
- Beyoncé – "Dangerously In Love"
- Lisa Marie Presley – "Lights Out"
- Lisa Marie Presley and Pat Benatar – "Heartbreaker"
- Ashanti – "Rock wit U (Awww Baby)"
- Whitney Houston and Bobby Brown – Medley: "Something In Common"/"My Love"
- Jewel – "Intuition"
- Chaka Khan and Mary J. Blige – "Sweet Thing"
- Tarralyn Ramsey – "I Wanna Dance With Somebody (Who Loves Me)"
- Whitney Houston – "Try It On My Own"
- Stevie Wonder tribute medley:
  - Shania Twain and Stevie Wonder – "Superstition"
  - Whitney Houston and Stevie Wonder – "I Was Made To Love Her"
  - Beyoncé and Stevie Wonder – "Signed, Sealed, Delivered I'm Yours"
  - Jewel and Stevie Wonder – "You Are The Sunshine Of My Life"
  - Mary J. Blige and Stevie Wonder – "Superwoman"
  - Ashanti and Stevie Wonder – "Do I Do"
  - Chaka Khan and Stevie Wonder – "Tell Me Something Good"
  - Queen Latifah and Stevie Wonder – "Living For The City"
- Stevie Wonder, Whitney Houston, Mary J. Blige, Beyoncé, Chaka Khan, Jewel, Ashanti and Queen Latifah – "Higher Ground"

== VH1 Divas 2004 ==
VH1 Divas: An Honors Concert For The VH1 Save The Music Foundation aired live from the MGM Grand Las Vegas on April 18, 2004.

The show marks the first appearance of close friends and R&B and soul legends Patti LaBelle (who was told by producers she would be considered "top dog") and Gladys Knight after they had turned down previous offers to appear. Gladys could never stay for the finale due to obligations with her one-woman show at the famed Flamingo Las Vegas. Kylie Minogue was originally confirmed as a headliner for the 1980s themed show, but withdrew shortly after.

Aside from the normal set of presenters, the concert also featured video testimonials from Chaka Khan, Carly Simon, Gloria Estefan, Mary J. Blige, Vanessa Williams, Alicia Keys, Pharrell Williams, Kathy Griffin (in what would prove to be the first of three consecutive appearances), Marg Helgenberger, Britney Spears and Usher on the word "diva", their favorite divas, as well as the importance of music education in schools.

The concert was never released on CD or DVD.

=== Headliners ===
- Patti LaBelle
- Jessica Simpson
- Joss Stone
- Cyndi Lauper
- Debbie Harry
- Gladys Knight
- Ashanti
- Eve

=== Guest performers ===
- Blondie
- Sheila E.
- Tom Jones
- The Pussycat Dolls (featuring Carmen Electra)

=== Presenters ===
- Jessica Alba
- Tyra Banks
- Rachel Bilson
- Daryl Hannah
- Jamie-Lynn Discala
- Nia Vardalos

=== Show sequence ===
- Patti LaBelle, Jessica Simpson, and Cyndi Lauper – "Lady Marmalade"
- Debbie Harry and Eve – "Rapture"
- Joss Stone – "Fell In Love With A Boy"
- Ashanti – "Medley: I'm Coming Out / Mo' Money Mo' Problems"
- Patti LaBelle – "New Day"
- Cyndi Lauper and Sheila E. – "Stay"
- Cyndi Lauper and Patti LaBelle – "Medley: Time After Time / True Colors"
- Jessica Simpson – "Take My Breath Away"
- Jessica Simpson – "Angels"
- Patti LaBelle – "Love, Need And Want You"
- Patti LaBelle – "If Only You Knew"
- Patti LaBelle – "You'll Never Walk Alone"
- Tom Jones and The Pussycat Dolls – "Medley: Tainted Love / You Can Leave Your Hat On"
- Blondie – "Good Boys"
- Blondie and Joss Stone – "One Way Or Another"
- Gladys Knight – "The Way We Were"
- Gladys Knight Medley:
  - Gladys Knight and Joss Stone – "I Don't Want To Do Wrong"
  - Gladys Knight and Jessica Simpson – "Midnight Train To Georgia"
  - Gladys Knight, Jessica Simpson, and Joss Stone – "I've Got To Use My Imagination"
- 1980s Medley Finale:
  - Cyndi Lauper – "Girls Just Want To Have Fun"
  - Sheila E. – "The Glamorous Life"
  - Blondie – "Call Me"
  - Ashanti – "Ain't Nobody"
  - Joss Stone – "(If You Love Someone) Set Them Free"
  - Jessica Simpson – "Higher Love"
  - The Pussycat Dolls – "Girls On Film"
  - Tom Jones – "Kiss"
  - Patti LaBelle – "New Attitude"
- Patti LaBelle, Cyndi Lauper, Debbie Harry, Joss Stone, Jessica Simpson, Sheila E., Ashanti, and The Pussycat Dolls – "New Attitude (Reprise)"

== VH1 Divas 2009 ==
VH1 Divas: An Honors Concert For The VH1 Save The Music Foundation aired live on September 17, 2009, at the Brooklyn Academy of Music (BAM) Howard Gilman Opera House in Brooklyn, New York. Paula Abdul hosted and performed. This concert was never released on CD or DVD.

=== Host and performer ===
- Paula Abdul

=== Headliners ===
- Adele
- Kelly Clarkson
- Miley Cyrus
- Jennifer Hudson
- Leona Lewis
- Jordin Sparks

=== Guest performers ===
- India.Arie
- Sheryl Crow
- Melissa Etheridge
- Cyndi Lauper
- Martina McBride
- Stevie Wonder

=== Presenters ===
- Toni Braxton
- Corbin Bleu
- Lauren Conrad
- Kathie Lee Gifford
- Kathy Griffin
- Keri Hilson
- Hoda Kotb
- Ryan Kwanten
- Liza Minnelli
- Whitney Port
- Sam Trammell
- Asher Book, Anna Maria Perez de Tagle, Kherington Payne, Naturi Naughton, and Walter Perez from the cast of Fame.

=== Show sequence ===
- Paula Abdul – Medley: "Cold Hearted"/"Opposites Attract"/"Straight Up"/"Forever Your Girl"
- Jennifer Hudson – "Spotlight"
- Kelly Clarkson – "Already Gone"
- Jordin Sparks – "S.O.S. (Let the Music Play)"
- Adele – "Hometown Glory"
- Leona Lewis – "Happy"
- Leona Lewis and Cyndi Lauper – "True Colors"
- Miley Cyrus – "Party in the U.S.A."
- Adele and India.Arie – "Video"
- Jordin Sparks and Martina McBride – "A Broken Wing"
- Jennifer Hudson and Stevie Wonder – "All In Love Is Fair"
- Miley Cyrus and Sheryl Crow – "If It Makes You Happy"
- Kelly Clarkson and Melissa Etheridge – "Bring Me Some Water"

== VH1 Divas Salute The Troops ==
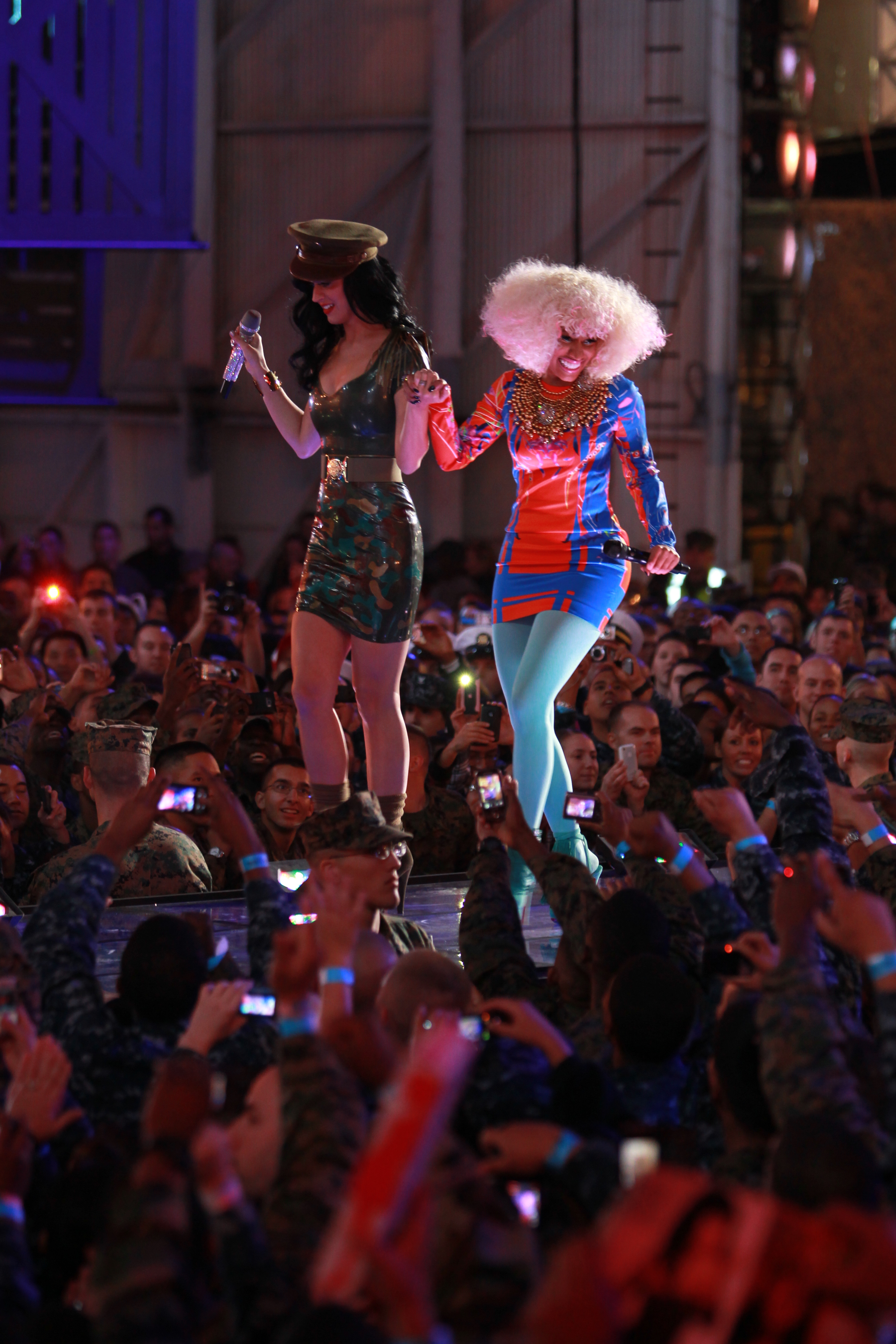
Katy Perry and Nicki Minaj performing "Girls Just Want to Have Fun" at VH1 Divas Salute The Troops.

VH1 Divas Salute The Troops was the second of the three concerts in the series not aired live. It was recorded on Friday, December 3, 2010, at Marine Corps Air Station Miramar while Paramore was filmed earlier in the week at Army Camp Arifjan in Kuwait. The special first aired on Sunday, December 5, 2010 and broadcast internationally by the Armed Forces Network.

The concert also featured a telecast featuring First Lady Michelle Obama, Taylor Swift, Beyoncé (in her third appearance on the series), Fergie, P!nk, Ke$ha and Carrie Underwood delivering special messages to the troops. Certain select servicemen and women from Miramar, Naval Base Coronado, Camp Pendleton, and Camp Arifjan were also presented in video portraits, documenting their careers and journey in the US military.

This show was never released on CD or DVD.

=== Host ===
- Kathy Griffin

=== Headliners ===
- Katy Perry
- Sugarland
- Grace Potter and the Nocturnals
- Keri Hilson
- Nicki Minaj
- Paramore

=== Guest performers ===
- Ann and Nancy Wilson of Heart
- MC Lyte

=== Presenters ===
- Brandy
- Marisa Miller
- Nicole "Snooki" Polizzi and Michael "The Situation" Sorrentino from Jersey Shore
- Jeffrey Ross
- Michael Strahan

and several servicemen and servicewomen

=== Show sequence ===
- Katy Perry, Keri Hilson, and Jennifer Nettles – "Boogie Woogie Bugle Boy"
- Katy Perry – "California Gurls"
- Katy Perry – "Teenage Dream" – Not aired in television broadcast
- Katy Perry – "Hot N Cold" – Not aired in television broadcast
- Paramore – "The Only Exception"
- Paramore – "Decode" – Not aired in television broadcast
- Paramore – "Misery Business" – Not aired in television broadcast
- Sugarland and MC Lyte – "Stuck Like Glue"
- Sugarland – "Tonight" – Not aired in television broadcast
- Sugarland – "All I Want to Do" – Not aired in television broadcast
- Grace Potter and The Nocturnals – "Top Gun Anthem" / "Paris (Oh La La)"
- Grace Potter and the Nocturnals – "Medicine" – Not aired in television broadcast
- Grace Potter and The Nocturnals and Ann and Nancy Wilson of Heart – "Crazy On You"
- Grace Potter and The Nocturnals and Ann and Nancy Wilson of Heart – "Rockin' in the Free World" – Not aired in television broadcast
- Nicki Minaj – "Moment 4 Life" – Not aired in television broadcast
- Nicki Minaj – "Right Thru Me"
- Nicki Minaj – "Roman's Revenge" – Not aired in television broadcast
- Katy Perry and Nicki Minaj – "Girls Just Want To Have Fun"
- Paramore – "My Hero"
- Keri Hilson – "Turnin Me On" – Not aired in television broadcast
- Keri Hilson – "Knock You Down" – Not aired in television broadcast
- Keri Hilson – "Pretty Girl Rock"
- Sugarland and Keri Hilson – "Think"
- Katy Perry – "Firework"

== VH1 Divas Celebrates Soul ==
VH1 Divas Celebrates Soul was the third of three concerts in the series not aired live. It was taped on December 18, 2011, at the Hammerstein Ballroom in New York City, and aired the next evening on VH1, paying tribute to the places that helped create or contributed to soul music: Chicago, Detroit, London, Philadelphia and Memphis.

Anita Baker, who was going to sing with Jill Scott, had to drop out moments before the concert after disagreements with producers, allowing Marsha Ambrosius and Ledisi to step in and perform in their places during the Detroit medley. Kelly Clarkson twisted her ankle on the way into the concert, though she still performed as planned.

The concert was never released on CD or DVD.

=== Headliners ===
- Mary J. Blige
- Kelly Clarkson
- Jennifer Hudson
- Florence Welch
- Jessie J
- Jill Scott

=== House band ===
- The Roots

=== Guest performers ===
- Marsha Ambrosius
- Erykah Badu
- Boyz II Men
- Estelle
- Wanda Jackson
- Sharon Jones & The Dap-Kings
- Chaka Khan
- Ledisi
- Travie McCoy
- Martha Reeves
- Mavis Staples

=== Presenters ===
- La La Anthony
- Common
- Terrence Howard
- Samuel L. Jackson
- Queen Latifah
- Nas
- Dolly Parton
- Archie Panjabi
- Sherri Shepherd

=== Show sequence ===
- Medley:
  - Kelly Clarkson, Mary J. Blige, and Jennifer Hudson – "You Keep Me Hangin' On"
  - Jennifer Hudson – "Spotlight"
  - Mary J. Blige" – "Real Love"
  - Kelly Clarkson – "Since U Been Gone"
  - Kelly Clarkson, Mary J. Blige, and Jennifer Hudson – "You Keep Me Hangin' On (Reprise)"
- Memphis tribute:
  - Jennifer Hudson and Jessie J – "Knock on Wood"
  - Erykah Badu, Chaka Khan, and Mavis Staples – "I'll Take You There"
- Florence + the Machine with Golden Orb Girls – "Shake It Out"
- Detroit medley:
  - Marsha Ambrosius, Sharon Jones and Martha Reeves – "Nowhere to Run"
  - Kelly Clarkson and Ledisi – "Chain of Fools"
  - Marsha Ambrosius and Ledisi – "Sweet Love"
- Jessie J – "Domino"
- Mary J. Blige – "Mr. Wrong"
- Amy Winehouse Tribute:
  - Sharon Jones & The Dap-Kings and Wanda Jackson- "You Know I'm No Good"
  - Florence Welch – "Back to Black"
- Philadelphia medley:
  - Estelle and Travie McCoy – "Wake Up Everybody"
  - Jill Scott, Erykah Badu, and Black Thought – "You Got Me"
  - Boyz II Men – "Motownphilly"
- Jill Scott – "Hear My Call"
- Kelly Clarkson – "What Doesn't Kill You (Stronger)"
- London medley:
  - Estelle, Erykah Badu, Marsha Ambrosius, and ?uestlove – "Back to Life (However Do You Want Me)"
  - Florence Welch – "Walking On Broken Glass"
- Jennifer Hudson – "Night of Your Life"
- Chicago medley:
  - Sharon Jones and Ledisi – "Rescue Me"
  - Mary J. Blige and Chaka Khan – "Ain't Nobody"
- Sharon Jones and The Dap-Kings – "He Said I Can" – Not aired in television broadcast

== VH1 Divas 2012 ==
VH1 Divas 2012 aired live on December 16, 2012 from the Shrine Auditorium in Los Angeles. The show was hosted by Adam Lambert and celebrated the dance-inducing music that is the vibrant soundtrack to every major blowout bash, unforgettable party and night out on the town. The show also paid tribute to the late music legends who died earlier that year: Whitney Houston and Donna Summer.

=== Host and performer ===
- Adam Lambert

=== Headliners ===
- Kelly Clarkson
- Ciara
- Miley Cyrus
- Demi Lovato
- Natasha Bedingfield
- Keri Hilson
- Kelly Rowland
- Jordin Sparks
- Ledisi
- Melanie Fiona
- Metric

=== Guest performers ===
- Iggy Azalea
- Bootsy Collins
- Paloma Faith
- Pitbull

=== Presenters ===
- La La Anthony
- Elisha Cuthbert
- Jenna Dewan
- Sheila E.
- Kat Graham
- Stacy Keibler
- Ellie Kemper
- Nene Leakes
- Brandy
- Kelly Osbourne
- LA Reid
- Amber Riley

=== House DJ ===
- Havana Brown

=== Show sequence ===
- Adam Lambert – "Let's Dance"
- Kelly Clarkson – "Catch My Breath"
- Ciara – "Billie Jean"/ "Got Me Good"
- Donna Summer Tribute
  - Kelly Rowland – "I Feel Love"/"Bad Girls"
  - Keri Hilson – "She Works Hard for the Money"
  - Adam Lambert – "Love to Love You Baby"/"Hot Stuff"
  - Kelly Rowland, Keri Hilson & Adam Lambert – "Last Dance"
- Metric – "Heart of Glass"
- Demi Lovato – "Give Your Heart a Break"
- Paloma Faith – "Picking Up the Pieces"
- Miley Cyrus – "Rebel Yell"
- Natasha Bedingfield, Iggy Azalea & Bootsy Collins – "Groove Is in the Heart"
- Metric – "Breathing Underwater"
- Adam Lambert – "Ray of Light"
- Whitney Houston Tribute
  - Jordin Sparks – "I'm Every Woman"
  - Melanie Fiona – "I Wanna Dance With Somebody (Who Loves Me)"/"It's Not Right but It's Okay"
  - Ledisi, Jordin Sparks & Melanie Fiona – "How Will I Know"
- Pitbull – "Don't Stop the Party"

== VH1 Divas Holiday: Unsilent Night ==
VH1 Divas Holiday: Unsilent Night was recorded on December 2, 2016, at the Kings Theater in Brooklyn, airing December 5, 2016. The concert was a holiday-themed celebration of music and pop-culture's greatest divas. The lineup included 'the Queen of Christmas' Mariah Carey, who returned to the Divas stage after 16 years for her third appearance, and Mariah's godmother, the iconic Patti LaBelle. Teyana Taylor and Vanessa Williams made debut appearances on the VH1 Divas stage, while the legendary Chaka Khan returned for her fourth time. The concert was the highest rated VH1 Divas broadcast in over a decade.

=== Headliners ===
- Mariah Carey
- Chaka Khan
- Patti LaBelle
- Vanessa Williams
- Teyana Taylor

=== Guest Performers ===
- Diana Gordon
- JoJo
- Remy Ma
- Bebe Rexha
- Serayah

=== Presenters ===
- La La Anthony
- Ashley Graham
- Jillian Hervey
- Gloria Reuben
- Mack Wilds
- Afton Williamson

=== Show sequence ===
- Mariah Carey – "All I Want For Christmas Is You"
- JoJo, Serayah & Bebe Rexha – "All Alone On Christmas"
- Remy Ma – "Christmas in Hollis"
- Patti LaBelle – "When You've Been Blessed (Feels Like Heaven)"
- Teyana Taylor – "Santa Baby"
- Vanessa Williams – "Save the Best for Last"/"What Child Is This?"
- Diana Gordon – "Jingle Bell Rock"
- Chaka Khan – "Medley"
  - "Ain't Nobody"
  - "Natural Woman" with Patti LaBelle
  - "I'm Every Woman" with Patti LaBelle, Teyana Taylor, JoJo, Bebe Rexha, Serayah, Diana Gordon & Remy Ma

== Legacy and impact ==
Saturday Night Live performers Ana Gasteyer, Molly Shannon and Cheri Oteri frequently spoofed Dion, Twain and Carey, most memorably in the opening moments of Divas '99 where they portrayed the songstresses attempting to order a pizza before watching the concert. On February 10, 2001, Jennifer Lopez starred in an SNL skit where she battled Mango onstage at VH1 Divas, with Tracy Morgan as Franklin, Maya Rudolph as Diana Ross, and Gasteyer and Shannon both reprising their impressions of Dion and Twain respectively.

Many of the featured performers are satirized as characters on the popular web parody Got 2B Real.

On season 3 of RuPaul's Drag Race All Stars, the second challenge of the season was a Divas parody. Aja portrayed Amy Winehouse, BeBe Zahara Benet was Diana Ross, BenDeLaCreme was Julie Andrews, Chi Chi DeVayne was Patti LaBelle, Kennedy Davenport played as Janet Jackson, Milk acted as Celine Dion, Shangela was Mariah Carey, Thorgy Thor impersonated Stevie Nicks and Trixie Mattel played as Dolly Parton. Shangela and BenDeLaCreme won the challenge.

Other networks attempted to replicate the success of the Divas concerts with varying degrees of success. The year after the original Divas, BET premiered Girls Nite Out, hosted by Rachel and Joe Clair. The featured performers were Arista labelmates Deborah Cox, Faith Evans, Andrea Martin, Monica, and Shanice. Lifetime hosted Women Rock! Girls & Guitars annually from 2000 to 2004, eventually shortened to simply Women Rock! and raising awareness for their campaign "Our Lifetime Commitment: Stop Breast Cancer for Life." Performers over the years included Anastacia, Blondie, Kelly Clarkson, Destiny's Child, En Vogue, Melissa Etheridge, Cyndi Lauper, and Lee Ann Womack.

In 2022, Meghan, Duchess of Sussex had Carey as a guest on the second episode of her podcast Archetypes, mentioning in her interview how influential the original concert was on her and her high school classmates.
