= Stars (Grace Potter and the Nocturnals song) =

Single by Grace Potter and the Nocturnals

from the album The Lion the Beast the Beat
- Released: 2012
- Genre: Rock
- Length: 3:35
- Label: Hollywood
- Songwriter: Grace Potter
- Producer: Jim Scott

Grace Potter and the Nocturnals singles chronology
| "Never Go Back" (2012) | "Stars" (2012) |

"Stars" is the second single from Grace Potter and the Nocturnals' fourth studio album The Lion the Beast the Beat and a follow-up to "Never Go Back", their debut single from the album.

The Deluxe Edition of The Lion the Beast the Beat also contains an alternative country version performed as a duo by Grace Potter and country singer Kenny Chesney.

== Music video ==
The music video was released on August 24, 2012. It was directed by Philip Andelman, who also directed for Taylor Swift and Beyoncé.

== Commercial performance ==
As of February 20, 2013, the song has sold 183,000 copies in the US. The song was certified gold by the RIAA on June 30, 2025.

== Critical reception ==
"Stars" was positively received by critics, deemed one of the best songs off the new album.

== Personnel ==
Adapted credits from the booklet.

Main version

- Grace Potter – lead vocals, keyboards, tambourine
- Scott Tournet – acoustic guitar, lead guitar, lap steel guitar, loops, ambience
- Benny Yurco – electric guitar
- Matt Burr – drums
- Michael Libramento – bass guitar
- David Campbell – string arrangements

Alternative country version

- Grace Potter – lead vocals, Hammond organ
- Pat Buchanan – electric guitar
- Kenny Chesney – backing vocals
- Chad Cromwell – drums
- Dan Dugmore – pedal steel guitar
- Larry Franklin – fiddle
- Kenny Greenberg – electric guitar
- John Barlow Jarvis – piano
- Alison Krauss – backing vocals
- Michael Rhodes – bass guitar
- Scott Tournet – electric guitar, acoustic guitar

== Covers ==
Amanda Brown, a contestant from Team Adam Levine in the third season of the American The Voice performed it on November 19, 2012.

American Idol semi-finalist Nick Boddington performed "Stars" during the final round of Hollywood Week in Season 12. The episode aired on February 7, 2013.

Emily Piriz performed this song during Hollywood Week on season 13 of American Idol which aired on February 12, 2014.

- On October 5, 2015, Shelby Brown covered the song choice selection on The Voice (U.S. season 9).
- On November 25, 2019, Marybeth Byrd covered the song during Top 11 fan choice selection on The Voice (U.S season 17).

== Charts ==
=== Weekly charts ===
| Chart (2012–13) | Peak position |
|---|---|
| Canada Hot 100 (Billboard) | 86 |
| US Billboard Hot 100 | 95 |
| US Hot Rock & Alternative Songs (Billboard) | 13 |
| US Adult Alternative Airplay (Billboard) | 15 |
| US Adult Pop Airplay (Billboard) | 27 |

=== Year-end charts ===
| Chart (2013) | Position |
|---|---|
| US Hot Rock Songs (Billboard) | 61 |
| US Adult Alternative Songs (Billboard) | 50 |

== Certifications ==
| Region | Certification | Certified units/sales |
|---|---|---|
| United States (RIAA) | Gold | 500,000^{‡} |
^{‡} Sales+streaming figures based on certification alone.
