= Daylight (Grace Potter album) =

Studio album by Grace Potter
- Released: October 25, 2019
- Genre: Soul; rock; Americana; power pop
- Length: 45:20
- Label: Fantasy
- Producer: Eric Valentine

Grace Potter chronology
| Midnight (2015) | Daylight (2019) | Mother Road (2023) |

Daylight is the third solo studio album by American musician Grace Potter, released through Fantasy Records on October 25, 2019. The album was produced by her husband, Eric Valentine, and was called both Potter's "comeback album" and a "thematic sequel" to her preceding album, Midnight (2015). It received generally positive reviews from critics and peaked at number 74 on the US Billboard 200.

== Critical reception ==
Professional ratings
Aggregate scores
| Source | Rating |
|---|---|
| Metacritic | 73/100 |
Review scores
| Source | Rating |
| AllMusic | 3.5/5 stars |
| American Songwriter | 3.5/5 stars |
| Paste | 7.3/10 |
| PopMatters | 7/10 |

Daylight received a score of 73 out of 100 on review aggregator Metacritic based on six critics' reviews, indicating "generally favorable" reception. Uncut called it a return to Potter's "stylistic comfort zone". James Christopher Monger of AllMusic stated that the album "feels hard-won but remarkably sanguine. It helps that Potter and Valentine have dialed back some of the slick AOR pop sheen that made Midnight so divisive" and felt that Daylight "works best when Potter is steering the ship" and even with the talents of her backing band, "Potter commands the room". Horowitz concurred that the "slick, synth-heavy, commercial pop" of Midnight is largely not present, as Potter has taken a "180 degree turn" and its sound has been replaced with a "more organic sounding musical approach" on what is overall "a more subdued, soulful and introspective affair". Horowitz concluded that while some of the "slick production" remains, it is still "an encouraging return to form".

Jeff Gaudiosi of PopMatters wrote that Potter "continu[es] to drift away from the sound of her former band, but the [tracks] don't quite veer into the pop territory of her last record", and despite this, "the most successful songs on the record are the ones that bear a passing resemblance to her old work". Paste's Ellen Johnson called Daylight "soul-stirring, hair-raising, floor-shakin' Americana that very often slides into good ol' fashioned rock 'n' roll" and remarked that Potter's "voice alone should be reason enough to pay attention to her", as her "roar makes every song worth listening to, even if each one more or less preaches the same point". Reviewing the album for Glide Magazine, Jeremy Lukens described it as Potter's "most uplifting and introspective release to date" and "a soft and heartfelt collection of power pop done right, full of catchy radio-ready hooks with few missteps".

== Track listing ==
Daylight track listing
| No. | Title | Writer(s) | Length |
|---|---|---|---|
| 1. | "Love Is Love" | Grace Potter; Mike Busbee; Eric Valentine | 3:06 |
| 2. | "On My Way" | Potter; Valentine | 3:42 |
| 3. | "Back to Me" (featuring Lucius) | Potter; Katie Pearlman | 4:45 |
| 4. | "Every Heartbeat" | Potter; Valentine | 4:12 |
| 5. | "Release" | Potter; Busbee | 4:32 |
| 6. | "Shout It Out" | Potter | 5:28 |
| 7. | "Repossession" (featuring Lucius) | Potter; Valentine | 3:44 |
| 8. | "Desire" (featuring Lucius) | Potter; Valentine | 3:00 |
| 9. | "Everyday Love" | Potter; Busbee; Valentine | 3:01 |
| 10. | "Please" (featuring Lucius) | Potter; Valentine | 5:29 |
| 11. | "Daylight" | Potter; Valentine | 4:21 |
| Total length: | | | 45:20 |

== Personnel ==
Credits adapted from Tidal.

- Grace Potter – vocals, Pro Tools (all tracks); tambourine (tracks 2, 11), electric guitar (6); acoustic guitar, piano (9)
- Eric Valentine – production, mixing, mastering, engineering (all tracks); guitar (1, 6), electric guitar (2, 8–11), bass guitar (4, 6, 9, 11); Mellotron, percussion (4); baritone guitar (5), drums (6, 8–10), acoustic guitar (9, 10)
- Bradley Cook – engineering
- Tim O'Sullivan – engineering
- Michael Carey – Pro Tools, engineering assistance
- Jacob Johnston – engineering assistance
- Maxwell D. Lee – engineering assistance
- Matt Musty – drums (1–4, 7, 11)
- Peter Slocombe – saxophone (1, 2); alto saxophone, baritone saxophone (3)
- Ryan Dragon – trombone (1–3)
- Mike Rocha – trumpet (1–3)
- Holly Laessig – vocals (1, 3, 7, 8, 10)
- Jess Wolfe – vocals (1, 3, 7, 8, 10)
- Larry Goldings – piano (1, 9), organ (1, 10)
- Greg Camp – bass guitar (1)
- Benny Yurco – electric guitar (2, 3, 7, 8, 11), acoustic guitar (4)
- Dylan Day – acoustic guitar (2, 4, 7), steel guitar (4, 10), electric guitar (10)
- Benmont Tench – organ (2, 4, 6, 7), piano (2, 8, 10)
- Dolly Sparks – background vocals (2, 9, 11)
- Kurtis Keber – bass guitar (3, 7, 11)
- Tom Ayers – acoustic guitar (3, 8), electric guitar (11)
- Tyler Chester – organ (3, 11), piano (8)
- Rob Moose – strings (3)
- Greg Wells – organ (5)
- Busbee – piano (5)
- Christopher Leckie – art direction, design
- Eliot Lee Hazel – photography

== Charts ==
Chart performance for Daylight
| Chart (2019) | Peak position |
|---|---|
| US Billboard 200 | 74 |
| US Top Rock Albums (Billboard) | 9 |
