= Midnight (Grace Potter album) =

Studio album by Grace Potter
- Released: August 14, 2015
- Studio: Barefoot, Hollywood, California
- Genre: Pop; dance-pop
- Length: 44:29
- Label: Hollywood
- Producer: Eric Valentine

Grace Potter chronology
Original Soul (2004)	Midnight (2015)	Daylight (2019)

Midnight is the second solo studio album by American musician Grace Potter, released through Hollywood Records on August 14, 2015. It features contributions from her former Nocturnals bandmates and was produced by Eric Valentine, whom Potter would marry in 2017. The album received generally positive reviews from critics, although its sound was described as having divided fans of her previous work with the Nocturnals due to its "slick" pop production. It peaked at number 26 on the US Billboard 200.

== Critical reception ==
Professional ratings
Aggregate scores
Source	Rating
Metacritic	68/100
Review scores
Source	Rating
AllMusic	4/5 stars
Billboard	3.5/5 stars
Consequence	B−
PopMatters	6/10

Midnight received a score of 68 out of 100 on review aggregator Metacritic based on seven critics' reviews, indicating "generally favorable" reception. Magnet stated that the album "might confuse (and lose) fans who have somehow missed the memo that Potter is creatively restless, but it's a boldly rhythmic step in a wild new direction". Michael Madden wrote that Potter explores a "broader range of sounds" on the "concise, hooky collection of songs", including "The Band-esque heartland stomp, vaguely twangy Southern rock, sensual new wave glide, and wiggly post-Pharrell funk". Madden also called it a "bold array, and the songs themselves are pretty bold, too, with multi-tracked choruses, erupting electric guitar riffs, and propulsive percussion". Stephen Thomas Erlewine of AllMusic described it as "headfirst [dive] into pure pop" and "a gleaming confection that, at its best, could be mistaken for late-'80s AOR". He also felt that Potter and Valentine "delight in celebrating and inverting the clichés of overblown '80s AOR and that's what makes Midnight such a fun trip".

Lee Zimmerman of PopMatters stated that is "clear that these songs serve mainly to project Potter's presence and define her essence as a prime blues belter pure and simple", despite the tracks being "simply serviceable although not quite strong enough to ensure a status that could be considered classic". Kenneth Partridge, reviewing the album for Billboard, felt that Potter "blow[s] out her sound even more" although she "doesn't totally ditch her blues-rock ways: Amid synth-y disco dalliances ('Alive Tonight') and soul-funk workouts ('Your Girl'), she leaves room for snarling riffs on 'Look What We've Become' and acoustic boom on 'Empty Heart'".

Boston Globe's Steve Morse dismissed the album as "a disaster" and wrote that Potter "throws away" her "great reputation as a soul-rock singer" on "a cheesy plunge into dance-pop that shows a crass haste to grab Top 40 radio play". Jon Caramanica of The New York Times called Potter's "version of liberation [...] an unexpected one" as she "has not only remade her sound, she's also moved herself farther from its center. She's a pop-rock eclectic now, pinballing among styles and letting her voice fill in the outlines rather than draw them". Caramanica felt "in a few places" the album is reminiscent of Fleetwood Mac's Tango in the Night (1987).

== Track listing ==
All tracks are written by Grace Potter and Eric Valentine; except "Empty Heart", "Biggest Fan", and "Low" (written by Potter); and "Look What We've Become" (written by Potter, Valentine, Daniel Merriweather, Matt Radosevich, and Ruth-Anne Cunningham).

Midnight track listing
No.	Title	Length
1.	"Hot to the Touch"	3:31
2.	"Alive Tonight"	2:53
3.	"Your Girl"	3:38
4.	"Empty Heart"	3:15
5.	"The Miner"	4:01
6.	"Delirious"	4:56
7.	"Look What We've Become"	3:11
8.	"Instigators"	3:09
9.	"Biggest Fan"	3:42
10.	"Low"	4:04
11.	"Nobody's Born with a Broken Heart"	3:54
12.	"Let You Go"	4:15
Total length:		44:29

== Personnel ==
Credits adapted from the album's liner notes.

- Grace Potter – vocals, background vocals, guitar, acoustic guitar, bass, Hammond B3 organs, Rheem organs, pipe organ, clavinet, harpsichord, synthesizers, piano, Casio, Mellotron, piano, upright piano, percussion, tambourine, vibes, toms, claps, art direction, design, studio photos
- Eric Valentine – vocals, background vocals, guitar, acoustic guitar, bass, synth bass, string arrangements, piano, keyboards, organ, Mellotron, sub synth, percussion, toms, claps, production, engineering, mixing, mastering on all tracks except "Alive Tonight"
- Matt Burr – vocals, background vocals, drums, percussion, toms, tambourine, stomps, claps
- Rob Moose – strings, string arrangements
- Scott Tournet – guitar, slide guitar, lap steel, pedal steel
- Benny Yurco – guitar, acoustic guitar
- Michael Libramento – bass
- Cian Riordan – background vocals, guitar, baritone guitar, percussion, gong, stomps, claps, engineering, mixing on "Biggest Fan"
- Audra Mae – vocals, background vocals
- Justin Long – background vocals, stomps, claps, engineering assistance
- Noelle Scaggs – background vocals
- Nick Oliveri – background vocals
- Rayland Baxter – background vocals
- Brian Lucey – mastering on "Alive Tonight"
- Dave Snow – creative direction
- Smog Design – art direction, design
- Allister Ann – cover photo
- Alysse Gafkjen – interior photos

== Charts ==
Chart performance for Midnight
Chart (2015)	Peak position
US Billboard 200	26
US Top Rock Albums (Billboard)	4
