= Amanda Brown (singer) =

American singer (born 1985)

- Born: Amanda Leah Brown; June 4, 1985 (age 41); The Bronx, New York, U.S.
- Genres: Pop, alternative rock, R&B, soul, gospel
- Occupations: Singer-songwriter, dancer, actress
- Instruments: Vocals, acoustic guitar
- Years active: 1999–present
- Website: amandabrownmusic.com

Amanda Leah Brown (born June 4, 1985) is an American singer and dancer from New York City. She was a contestant on the third season of NBC’s The Voice and finished in fifth place.

== Early life and education ==
Amanda Leah Brown was born on June 4, in the Bronx, New York, the oldest of three children. She is Puerto-Rican/Jamaican. She began singing at her local church in the Bronx at the age of six. At the age of 12, Brown decided to audition for the prestigious New York performing arts school, Fiorello H. LaGuardia High School of Music & Art and Performing Arts. There she was introduced to a world of music: classical, jazz, pop, and rock. With a background in gospel music, Brown began to explore other music genres and experiment with her own singing/songwriting style.

At the age of 18, Brown attended Howard University in Washington, D.C. After her first year of college, she decided to return to New York to pursue a career in music and transferred to Baruch College.

Amanda's younger sister, Samara, performed on the 21st season of The Voice. John Legend and Ariana Grande turned their chairs and she chose John Legend as her coach.

== Career ==
While attending college in New York, Brown began auditioning for various singing opportunities, which eventually led her to a life-changing offer to join Alicia Keys on her worldwide As I Am Tour in 2007 as a background singer. Brown went on to sing backing vocals for artists such as Adele and Stevie Wonder. Brown is currently on tour with hozier for the unreal unearthed tour 2025

Brown began singing at the popular live-music venue, the Village Underground, located in the lower west side of Manhattan.

In 2011, Brown digitally released her first single on iTunes entitled "Dreamer", which was co-written by Texacal, and produced by Z Musik.

=== The Voice ===
In 2012, Brown auditioned for the third season of The Voice. She won a spot on Cee Lo Green's team, and was later stolen by Adam Levine after a duet performance with Trevin Hunte of Mariah Carey's "Vision of Love", which was considered one of the best battles in the history of The Voice. She had also become the first stolen contestant in the history of The Voice.

Brown's biggest moment came during her performance of Aerosmith's "Dream On", which was met with praise in Rolling Stone magazine.

During her appearance on The Voice, Brown appeared on the Billboard Hot 100 and Billboard Digital Songs with her singles of "Dream On", "Stars" and "Someone Like You".

She was also the first contestant on season three to perform by herself alongside another major artist (Ne-Yo) for a performance that opened the live show on December 3, 2012.

Despite her success on the show, Brown was eliminated after making it to the top six contestants. During her exit interview, Brown stated, "This has been an extremely beautiful and amazing ride, and I owe my existence on this show for as long as I was here to [the fans]. So from the bottom of my heart – thank you."

==== Performances and results ====
– Studio version of performance reached the top 10 on iTunes

| Stage | Song | Original Artist | Date | Order | Result |
|---|---|---|---|---|---|
| Blind Audition | "Valerie" | The Zutons | September 25, 2012 | N/A | One Chair Turned; Joined Team Cee Lo |
| Battle Rounds | "Vision of Love" (vs. Trevin Hunte) | Mariah Carey | October 8, 2012 | N/A | Defeated; Stolen by Adam Levine |
| Knockout Rounds | "Paris (Ooh La La)" (vs. Michelle Brooks-Thompson) | Grace Potter and the Nocturnals | October 29, 2012 | 16.3 | Saved by Coach |
| Live Playoffs | "Dream On" | Aerosmith | November 5, 2012 | 18.10 | Saved by Public Vote |
| Live Top 12 | "Spectrum" | Florence and the Machine | November 12, 2012 | 21.5 | Saved by Public Vote |
| Live Top 10 | "Stars" | Grace Potter and the Nocturnals | November 19, 2012 | 23.6 | Saved by Public Vote |
| Live Top 8 | "Someone Like You" | Adele | November 26, 2012 | 25.1 | Saved by Public Vote |
| Live Top 6 | "(You Make Me Feel Like) A Natural Woman" | Aretha Franklin | December 3, 2012 | 27.3 | Eliminated |
| Live Top 6 | "Here I Go Again" | Whitesnake | December 3, 2012 | 27.9 | Eliminated |

=== After The Voice ===
After appearing on The Voice, Brown recorded a cover of the James Brown funk track "The Payback" for the soundtrack to the 2013 film Identity Thief.

She was also a contributing writer for Parade Magazine, publishing episode reviews of The Voice: Season Four.

In May 2013, Brown performed Magic to Do at the Ben Vereen Lifetime Achievement Gala at her former High School Fiorello H. LaGuardia High School of Music & Art and Performing Arts.

Within a week of her Ben Vereen feature, Brown also performed both Ain't No Mountain High Enough and How Am I Supposed to Live Without You in two duets with Michael Bolton on Fox & Friends

In June 2013, Brown released a song on EMW Music Group's album "Shuffle". All the proceeds from the album went to VH1 Save The Music Foundation.

In December 2015, Brown performed backing vocals for Adele in the NBC special, "Adele Live in New York City" at Radio City Music Hall. Brown then went on to tour with Adele for her Adele Live 2016 world tour from February 29, 2016 to June 29, 2017. Adele would also bring her back for all of her live shows during the ‘30’ era, including Adele One Night Only, An Audience With Adele, and the Weekends with Adele Vegas Residency. In 2024 she also perform backing vocals for Adele in the Adele in Munich residence

In February 2018, Brown dropped "Believers", the first single of her first full-length project "Dirty Water", released on May 11, 2018.

In April 2018, Brown released "No Good", the second single of her debut album "Dirty Water".

== Discography ==
- Dirty Water (2018)

=== Singles ===
| Year | Single | Peak positions | | Sales | Album |
| Year | Single | US | CAN | Sales | Album |
|---|---|---|---|---|---|
| 2011 | "Dreamer" | — | — | — | Single release |
| 2012 | "Dream On" | 113 | 94 | US: 32,000 | Non-album releases by The Voice |
| 2012 | "Stars" | 97 | 69 | US: 47,000 | Non-album releases by The Voice |
| 2012 | "Someone Like You" | — | — | US: 22,000 | Non-album releases by The Voice |
| 2018 | "Believers" | — | — | — | Dirty Water |
| 2018 | "No Good" | — | — | — | Dirty Water |
