= Medicine (Grace Potter and the Nocturnals song) =

Single by Grace Potter and the Nocturnals

from the album Grace Potter and the Nocturnals
- Released: 2010
- Recorded: May 2010 in Hollywood, California
- Genre: Rock
- Length: 4:06
- Label: Hollywood
- Songwriter(s): Grace Potter, Matt Burr, Scott Tournet
- Producer(s): Mark Batson

Grace Potter and the Nocturnals singles chronology
"I Want Something That I Want" (2008)	"Medicine" (2010)	"Paris (Ooh La La)" (2010)

"Medicine" is a song by Grace Potter and the Nocturnals, released on their eponymous album (2010). It is the lead single, was originally intended as the name of the album, and was promoted as such in numerous interviews and early reviews, but the album title was changed shortly after the replacement of producer T Bone Burnett in favor of Dave Matthews Band producer, Mark Batson.

== Meaning ==
Potter has said of the song, "Matt and Scott came up with the music for 'Medicine'—the drum roll and that killer guitar hook—months before I came up with the lyrics or the vocal melody. It gets across the emotion of somebody trying to steal your man away and then fighting for what's yours, getting back to a place where you're in control. I picture my adversary as a young Stevie Nicks, but with long black hair, who shows up, woos everybody and freaks me out, until I realize there is something I can do—then I step up and make my own magic. It's my favorite song to perform. That and 'Paris' are the sexiest, feistiest and the most fun of anything we've ever done."

== Personnel ==
Adapted credits from the booklet.

- Grace Potter – lead vocals, Hammond organ
- Scott Tournet – lead guitar, loops, vocals
- Benny Yurco – rhythm guitar
- Catherine Popper – bass guitar
- Matt Burr – drums, percussion

== Release and reception ==
"Medicine" was released in the US as a single on December 14, 2010, and December 28, 2010 in the UK. The song has been very well received by critics and fans alike, becoming a regular song at every show the band performs. WRBC, a Maine-based music magazine said of "Medicine", "The single 'Medicine' represents some of the best elements of Ms. Potter's revamped sound, most notably her songwriting and thumping classic rock guitar lines." The song has received heavy radio play in Vermont and Maine, being "a regular request" according to the rock stations 102.9 WBLM, and Rock 93.9 FM The Valleys Rock Station.

== Music video ==
On September 15, 2010, on their official Myspace page, Grace Potter and the Nocturnals announced they were filming "Medicine" as the second music video for the album, for release in December 2010.

== Track versions ==
1. "Medicine" (LP version) (4:06) on Grace Potter and the Nocturnals
