= Live from the Legendary Sun Studio =

Live album by Grace Potter and the Nocturnals
- Released: April 21, 2012
- Recorded: 2008 at the Sun Studio in Memphis
- Genre: Roots rock, swamp rock, blues rock, rock and roll
- Length: 32 minutes
- Label: Hollywood

Grace Potter and the Nocturnals chronology
Grace Potter and the Nocturnals (2010)	Live from the Legendary Sun Studio (2012)	The Lion the Beast the Beat (2012)

Live from the Legendary Sun Studios is a live album by Grace Potter and the Nocturnals. It was recorded over several sessions at the famed Sun Studio in Memphis in 2008, while the band was on tour.

The live album was released on Record Store Day 2012. It is available on both CD and Vinyl.

== Track listing ==
1. "Night Rolls On" - 3:11
2. "Outta My Tree" - 3:30
3. "Sugar" - 4:35
4. "Put Your Head Down" - 4:20
5. "One Short Night" - 4:03
6. "Can't See Through" - 5:09
7. "Fooling Myself" - 6:53
