= Mother Road (album) =

Studio album by Grace Potter
- Released: August 18, 2023
- Studios: RCA Studio A (Nashville); Topangadise (Topanga); Barefoot (Hollywood)
- Length: 40:27
- Label: Fantasy
- Producer: Eric Valentine

Grace Potter chronology
Daylight (2019)	Mother Road (2023)	Trespasser (2026)

Mother Road is the fifth solo studio album by American musician Grace Potter, released through Fantasy Records on August 18, 2023. As with Potter's previous two solo albums, it was produced by her husband Eric Valentine. Multiple singles preceded the album, including "Good Time" in June 2023, and "Ready Set Go" and "Lady Vagabond" in July, the latter two of which were said to contain Potter's "free-wheeling voice and bluesy style". Potter will tour North America in support of the album in late 2023.

== Background and recording ==
Potter was inspired to write the album after a road trip heading west across the United States, on which she realized she was "running away" thus "embolden[ing her] to write an album that reaches far beyond what actually happened–launching [her] down the alternate-reality roads of what could have happened". She once again collaborated with producer Eric Valentine and recorded the album at RCA Studio A in Nashville, Tennessee and Topagandise in Topanga, California. The resulting album was described as containing a "soundscape of soulful rock, roots, funk, country, and R&B".

== Track listing ==
All tracks are written by Grace Potter, except where noted.

Mother Road track listing
No.	Title	Writer(s)	Length
1.	"Mother Road"		5:12
2.	"Truck Stop Angels"		0:47
3.	"Ready Set Go"		3:26
4.	"Good Time"		5:33
5.	"Little Hitchhiker"	Potter; Natalie Hemby	3:12
6.	"Lady Vagabond"		5:49
7.	"Rose Colored Rearview"	Potter; Cary Barlowe; Hillary Lindsey; Margaret McRee	3:58
8.	"All My Ghosts"	Potter; Barlowe; Lindsey; McRee	4:22
9.	"Futureland"		3:22
10.	"Masterpiece"		4:46
Total length:			40:27

== Personnel ==
Musicians

- Grace Potter – vocals, vocal arrangement, acoustic guitar, bass harmonica, tambourine, cabasa, Wurlitzer, sound effects, clavinet, piano, ocarina
- Tim Deaux – bass, percussion
- Matt Musty – drums, percussion
- Nick Bockrath – electric guitars, acoustic guitar, percussion
- Benmont Tench – organ, ARP String Ensemble
- Eric Valentine – drum machine, synth bass, synth pad, sound effects, shaker, timpani, African lute, castanets, electric guitar, acoustic guitar
- Dan Kalisher – pedal steel, electric guitar
- Barclay Moffitt – saxophone
- Landon Grigsby – first trumpet
- Joel Schnaper – second trumpet
- Paul Nelson – trombone

Technical

- Eric Valentine – production, mastering, mixing, engineering
- Michael Bloom – mixing assistance
- Phillip Smith – engineering assistance
- Nick Brumme – engineering assistance

Visuals

- Grace Potter – artwork, package design, photography
- Carrie Smith – package design

== Charts ==
Chart performance for Mother Road
Chart (2023)	Peak position
US Independent Albums (Billboard)	34
