= Trespasser (album) =

Studio album by Grace Potter
- Released: August 21, 2026
- Studios: Barefoot (Hollywood); Topangadise (Topanga); RCA Studio A (Nashville); Sonic Forest (Mad River Valley)
- Length: 39:09
- Labels: Mother Road; Thirty Tigers
- Producer: Eric Valentine

Grace Potter chronology
Mother Road (2023)	Trespasser (2026)

Trespasser is the sixth solo studio album by the American musician Grace Potter. It was released on August 21, 2026, under Potter's own label Mother Road Records with distribution helmed by Thirty Tigers.

== Background ==
Trespasser was produced by Potter's husband Eric Valentine. VTDigger wrote that the album's title was partially inspired by lyrics from the song "This Land Is Your Land" by Woody Guthrie.

== Promotion ==
Trespasser was preceded by the release of three singles. The first single, "Love Me Not" was released on May 15, 2026. Potter would later promote the song by performing it on CBS Saturday Morning on August 22, 2026. The second single, "Run Baby Run", was released on June 12, 2026. The third and final single, "Belong", was released on July 17, 2026.

== Track listing ==
Trespasser track listing
No.	Title	Writer(s)	Length
1.	"Main Street U.S.A."	Grace Potter	3:35
2.	"Ride or Die"	Potter; Eric Valentine	2:56
3.	"Love Me Not"	Potter	3:54
4.	"Gasoline"	Potter; Ross Copperman; Josh Knight	4:16
5.	"Run Baby Run"	Potter	3:16
6.	"Lost Cafe"	Potter	3:20
7.	"Trespasser"	Potter; Alex Proctor; Valentine	3:45
8.	"The Voice"	Potter	3:35
9.	"War on the Mountain"	Potter	5:37
10.	"Belong"	Potter	4:55
Total length:			39:09

== Personnel ==
Credits are adapted from the album's liner notes.

=== Musicians ===
- Grace Potter – lead vocals (all tracks), Wurlitzer (tracks 1, 10), organ (2, 5), keyboards (3, 5–8), piano (4), percussion (5–9), guitars (5), baritone harmonica (6); ocarina, flute (9); acoustic guitar (10)
- Jordan West – drums (1–3, 5, 8)
- Kurtis Keber – bass guitar (1–3, 5, 8)
- Indya Bratton – guitars (1, 2, 8), dreamy guitar (5)
- Eric Valentine – percussion (1, 3), slap guitar (5), drums (7), timpani (9)
- Nick Bockrath – guitars (1, 4, 6, 8, 10); acoustic guitar, electric guitar (9)
- Sambra Viva Angels – choir vocals (2, 4, 7, 9, 10)
- Ricky Dover Jr. – guitars (2), growl guitar (5)
- Peggy Potter – background vocals (3)
- Sparky Potter – background vocals (3)
- Sagan Valentine – background vocals (3)
- Ramsey Brown – background vocals (3)
- Everest Brown – background vocals (3)
- Clive Canther – background vocals (3)
- Wylie Canther – background vocals (3)
- Harden Canther – background vocals (3)
- Alexina Canther – background vocals (3)
- Patrik Kasic – background vocals (3)
- Charlotte Kasic – background vocals (3)
- Bowie Kasic – background vocals (3)
- Zoran Kasic – background vocals (3)
- Finley Jokevic – background vocals (3)
- Luca Jokevic – background vocals (3)
- Dragan Jokevic – background vocals (3)
- Miles Day-Russel – background vocals (3)
- Olin Day-Russel – background vocals (3)
- Pam Day-Russel – background vocals (3)
- Andrew Day-Russel – background vocals (3)
- Tim Deaux – bass guitar (4, 6, 9, 10)
- Matt Musty – drums (4, 6, 9, 10)
- Dan Kalisher – pedal steel (4, 10)
- Alex Proctor – bass guitar (7)
- Benmont Tench – organ (9, 10)

=== Technical ===
- Eric Valentine – production, engineering, mixing
- Chris Gehringer – mastering
- Phillip Smith – engineering
- Dragan Jakovljevic – engineering
- Alex Proctor – engineering
- Nick Brumme – engineering
- Mike Blum – engineering
- Emma Laskaris – studio assistance
- Paige Haynes – studio assistance
- Sagan Valentine – studio assistance
- James Mountford – photography
- Matt Needle – design
- Dilly Gent – art direction
