= The Lion the Beast the Beat =

The Lion The Beast The Beat

Studio album by Grace Potter and the Nocturnals
- Released: June 12, 2012
- Genre: Melodic rock, experimental rock
- Length: 45:43
- Label: Hollywood
- Producer: Dan Auerbach, Grace Potter, Jim Scott

Grace Potter and the Nocturnals chronology
| Live from the Legendary Sun Studio (2012) | The Lion The Beast The Beat (2012) |

The Lion The Beast The Beat is the fourth and final studio album by American rock band Grace Potter and the Nocturnals, released on June 12, 2012. The album debuted at 17 on Billboard's Top 200 Album chart, selling 24,000 units in its opening week. The album has sold 159,000 copies in the US as of June 2015.

== Reception ==
Metacritic, a website which assigns television, music, and film an average score based on several reviews, gave the album a 70 out of 100, indicating positive reviews. Review website Consequence of Sound stated that "Potter's vocals are gorgeous as always, but the overall tone of the Nocturnals has arguably changed — forgoing country for experimental rock, they’ve also successfully woven electronic influences into the mix". The New York Times said that The Lion The Beast The Beat is "the fourth, and by far best, studio album by this band". AllMusic, whilst calling the album overall a "creative leap" and Potter's melodies "solid", considered some of her lyric choices "...a bit clunky" and added that the band compensated with "passion, execution, and smart production choices and arrangements".

Mickey Woods of Glamour magazine considered the album a mixed result, commenting "which I believe to be intentional". He also called the album "frenzied and scattered, but incredibly dynamic", complimenting the instruments and Potter's "totally electric" voice and compared her voice to Jefferson Airplane. Review website PopMatters also gave the album a positive review, noting that Potter has the "vocal arsenal of a Greek God—part Joplin, part Boudica, all lethal weapon" and calling the album a "mischievously devilish quandary". PremierGuitar.com also gave the album a positive review, complimenting several of the songs including the title track and the album a "collection of highly inspired songs to deliver a full range of foot-stompers, piercing hooks, and driving melody".

== Track listing ==
All tracks are written by Grace Potter, except where noted.

| No. | Title | Writer(s) | Length |
|---|---|---|---|
| 1. | "The Lion the Beast the Beat" | | 5:26 |
| 2. | "Never Go Back" | Potter, Dan Auerbach, Scott Tournet, Matt Burr, Benny Yurco | 3:40 |
| 3. | "Parachute Heart" | Potter, Tournet | 4:08 |
| 4. | "Stars" | | 3:35 |
| 5. | "Timekeeper" | | 4:39 |
| 6. | "Loneliest Soul" | Potter, Auerbach, Tournet, Burr, Yurco | 3:35 |
| 7. | "Turntable" | | 4:01 |
| 8. | "Keepsake" | | 3:34 |
| 9. | "Runaway" | Potter, Auerbach, Tournet, Burr, Yurco | 3:19 |
| 10. | "One Heart Missing" | | 4:21 |
| 11. | "The Divide" | | 5:20 |

Deluxe Edition Tracks
| No. | Title | Writer(s) | Length |
|---|---|---|---|
| 12. | "Roulette" | | 3:59 |
| 13. | "All Over You" | | 3:32 |
| 14. | "Stars (feat. Kenny Chesney)" | | 3:10 |
| 15. | "Ragged Company (feat. Willie Nelson)" | Potter, Burr, Tournet, Bryan Dondero | 4:38 |

== Charts ==
| Chart (2012) | Peak position |
|---|---|
| US Billboard 200 | 17 |
| US Top Rock Albums (Billboard) | 7 |
| US Indie Store Album Sales (Billboard) | 2 |

== Personnel ==
Adapted credits from the booklet.

The Nocturnals

- Grace Potter – vocals (all tracks), guitar (1, 11, 13), tambourine (1, 3, 4, 8, 11), keyboards (2–8, 13), Wurlitzer (6), Mellotron (2), synth bass (7), Hammond organ (1, 3, 9, 10, 14, 15), pipe organ (1), percussion (7), clock (5), drums (13)
- Scott Tournet – guitars (1–14), Echoplex (1, 7), keyboards (2, 5), bass guitar (6), lap steel guitar (3, 4), vocals (3, 6, 9, 11), loops (4), noise (5, 8), ambience (4, 10), drums (13)
- Benny Yurco – guitars (1–7, 10, 11, 13), synth bass (1), vocals (3, 6, 7, 11), sitar (6), Echoplex (3, 7), bass guitar (8, 9, 12, 13), ambience (10), noise (5, 11), drums (13)
- Matt Burr – drums (1–13), tambourine (1), vocals (3, 6, 7, 9, 11), percussion (7, 8, 13), trash cans (8), shaker (9)
- Michael Libramento – drums (1, 12), bass guitar (1, 2, 4, 5, 11), agogô bells (2), vocals (3, 9, 11), keyboards (9), tambourine (1, 9, 13), Moog bass (10)

Additional personnel

- Dan Auerbach – Casio drum loop (2), vocals & handclaps (6), producer
- Jim Scott – percussion (3), cowbell (12)
- David Campbell – string arrangements (1, 4, 10, 11)
- Geoffrey Weiss – claves (13)
- Larry Franklin – fiddle (14)
- Willie Nelson – vocals, gut-string guitar and Trigger (15)
- Mickey Raphael – harmonica (15)
- John Barlow Jarvis – piano (14, 15)
- Kenny Greenberg – electric guitar (14, 15)
- Michael Rhodes – bass guitar (14, 15)
- Pat Buchanan – electric guitar (14, 15)
- Dan Dugmore – steel guitar (14, 15)
- Chad Cromwell – drums (14, 15)
- Kenny Chesney – backing vocals (14)
- Alison Krauss – backing vocals (14)
