= Ashes & Dust =

Studio album by Warren Haynes
- Released: July 24, 2015
- Recorded: 2014–2015
- Genre: Rock
- Length: 79:09
- Label: Concord Music Group

Warren Haynes chronology
Man in Motion (2011)	Ashes & Dust (2015)

Ashes & Dust is the third solo album by the Allman Brothers Band and Gov't Mule guitarist and singer Warren Haynes. The album was released on July 24, 2015, by Concord Music Group.

== Critical reception ==
Professional ratings
Review scores
Source	Rating
AllMusic	3.5/5 stars
Exclaim!	9/10
PopMatters	8/10 stars

Ashes & Dust was met with generally positive reviews from music critics. Thom Jurek of AllMusic said, "While Ashes & Dust doesn't really add anything "new" to Haynes' musical profile—fans already knew this was here—there are some fine benchmarks: his singing has never used such a range of dynamics before; for once he lets the song dictate his expression. Others are tight songwriting and arranging craft—especially when fleshed out by the almost limitless creativity of Railroad Earth. Ashes & Dust is a worthy and welcome addition to Haynes' catalog." Jonathan Frahm of PopMatters said, "Someone most widely known by a wide margin for his work as a rocker, Haynes shows off his Americana side in just as seamlessly great a manner as he had any other performance in the past. In doing so, he simultaneously proves his prowess as a competent musician given any platform to toy with, and that labels in the first place might just be rather confounded." Matt Bauer of Exclaim! said, "Overall, Ashes And Dust is undeniable proof of Warren Haynes' growth as a songwriter and an affirmation of his continuing successful eclecticism."

== Track listing ==
No.	Title	Length
1.	"Is It Me or You"	5:14
2.	"Coal Tattoo"	7:26
3.	"Blue Maiden's Tale"	7:26
4.	"Company Man"	4:48
5.	"New Year's Eve"	4:39
6.	"Stranded In Self-Pity"	6:36
7.	"Glory Road"	5:59
8.	"Gold Dust Woman" (featuring Grace Potter)	6:24
9.	"Beat Down the Dust"	6:24
10.	"Wanderlust"	4:50
11.	"Spots of Time"	8:24
12.	"Hallelujah Boulevard"	5:44
13.	"Word On the Wind"	6:47

Deluxe edition (bonus tracks)
No.	Title	Length
1.	"Company Man"	4:51
2.	"New Year's Eve"	4:19
3.	"Glory Road"	4:39
4.	"Wanderlust"	5:02
5.	"Hallelujah Boulevard"	6:26

1-4: Warren Haynes acoustic demos, 5 live 2008 @ Angel Orensanz Foundation

== Personnel ==
- Warren Haynes- acoustic & electric guitar, lead vocals

Railroad Earth:

- Andy Goessling- lap steel guitar, acoustic guitar, banjo, clarinet, backing vocals
- John Skehan- piano, mandolin
- Tim Carbone- violin, accordion
- Todd Sheaffer- acoustic guitar, backing vocals
- Andy Altman- electric (upright) bass, acoustic bass guitar
- Carey Harmon- drums & percussion

- Grace Potter- lead vocal ("Gold Dust Woman")
- Oteil Burbridge- bass guitar ("Spots of Time")
- Marc Quiñones- conga drums, percussion ("Spots of Time")
- Mickey Raphael- harmonica ("Wanderlust")
- Shawn Colvin- backing vocals ("Wanderlust")

== Charts ==
Chart (2015)	Peak position
US Billboard 200	50
US Top Rock Albums (Billboard)	6
US Top Tastemaker Albums (Billboard)	3
