= This Is Somewhere =

Studio album by Grace Potter and the Nocturnals
- Released: August 7, 2007
- Genre: Folk rock, roots rock, country rock
- Length: 47:27
- Label: Hollywood

Grace Potter and the Nocturnals chronology
Live Oh Five (2005)	This Is Somewhere (2007)	Live in Skowhegan (2008)

This Is Somewhere is the second studio album, and the first on a major record label, by Grace Potter and the Nocturnals, released in August 2007 by Hollywood Records. The album debuted at #119 on the Billboard Top 200 the week of August 25, 2007 and at #1 on the Billboard Heatseekers Chart.

The album's title is a reference to Everybody Knows This Is Nowhere by Neil Young. The song "Apologies" has been featured on the television shows Kyle XY, One Tree Hill, and Brothers & Sisters, and the song "Falling or Flying" has been featured on Grey's Anatomy and ER.

The album's cover art appeared on the season four episode of "Ace of Cakes", Volcano Cakes and Mix Tapes, appearing on a cake for The Sound Garden, an indie music store.

== Track listing ==
All tracks are written by Grace Potter.

Standard
No.	Title	Length
1.	"Ah Mary"	4:36
2.	"Stop the Bus"	3:52
3.	"Apologies"	5:12
4.	"Ain't No Time"	3:27
5.	"Mr. Columbus"	3:41
6.	"You May See Me"	4:27
7.	"Lose Some Time"	5:22
8.	"Mastermind"	3:58
9.	"Here's to the Meantime"	3:59
10.	"Falling or Flying"	4:57
11.	"Big White Gate"	4:56

Japan Bonus Tracks
No.	Title	Length
12.	"Belladonna"	3:43
13.	"Over Again"	8:50

iTunes Bonus Track
No.	Title	Length
12.	"If I Was from Paris"	3:51

Barnes & Noble Bonus Track
No.	Title	Length
12.	"'Til the Morning Comes"	3:47

Professional ratings
Review scores
Source	Rating
Allmusic	3/5 stars

== Personnel ==
Adapted from AllMusic and the booklet.

The Nocturnals

- Grace Potter – vocals (all tracks), guitar (6–9), keyboards (all tracks), Mellotron (4, 6, 8), Hammond organ (all tracks), pipe organ (11)
- Scott Tournet – guitar (1–6, 8–11), harmonica (3, 9), lap steel guitar (6, 7), slide guitar (9, 11), loops (6, 8, 10), Stylophone (8), whale sounds (6), background vocals (all tracks)
- Bryan Dondero – bass guitar (1–6, 8–11), Echoplex (8, 10), baritone guitar (5), mandolin (7)
- Matt Burr – drums (1–6, 8, 9, 11), percussion (1, 7, 8)

Additional personnel

- Mike Daly – guitar (1–6, 8–11), pedal steel guitar (6), lap steel guitar (3), autoharp (7), keyboards (8), accordion (3, 7), vibraphone (6, 10), producer (all tracks)
- Alan Bezozi – percussion (all tracks)
- Booty Call Choir – background vocals (1, 4, 8–11)
- Rob Mathes – horn arrangements (8, 11)
- Jeff Kievit – trumpet (8, 11)
- Michael Davis – trombone (8, 11)
- Aaron Heick – alto saxophone (8, 11)
- Andy Snitzer – tenor saxophone (8, 11)
