= Grace Potter =

American singer-songwriter and musician

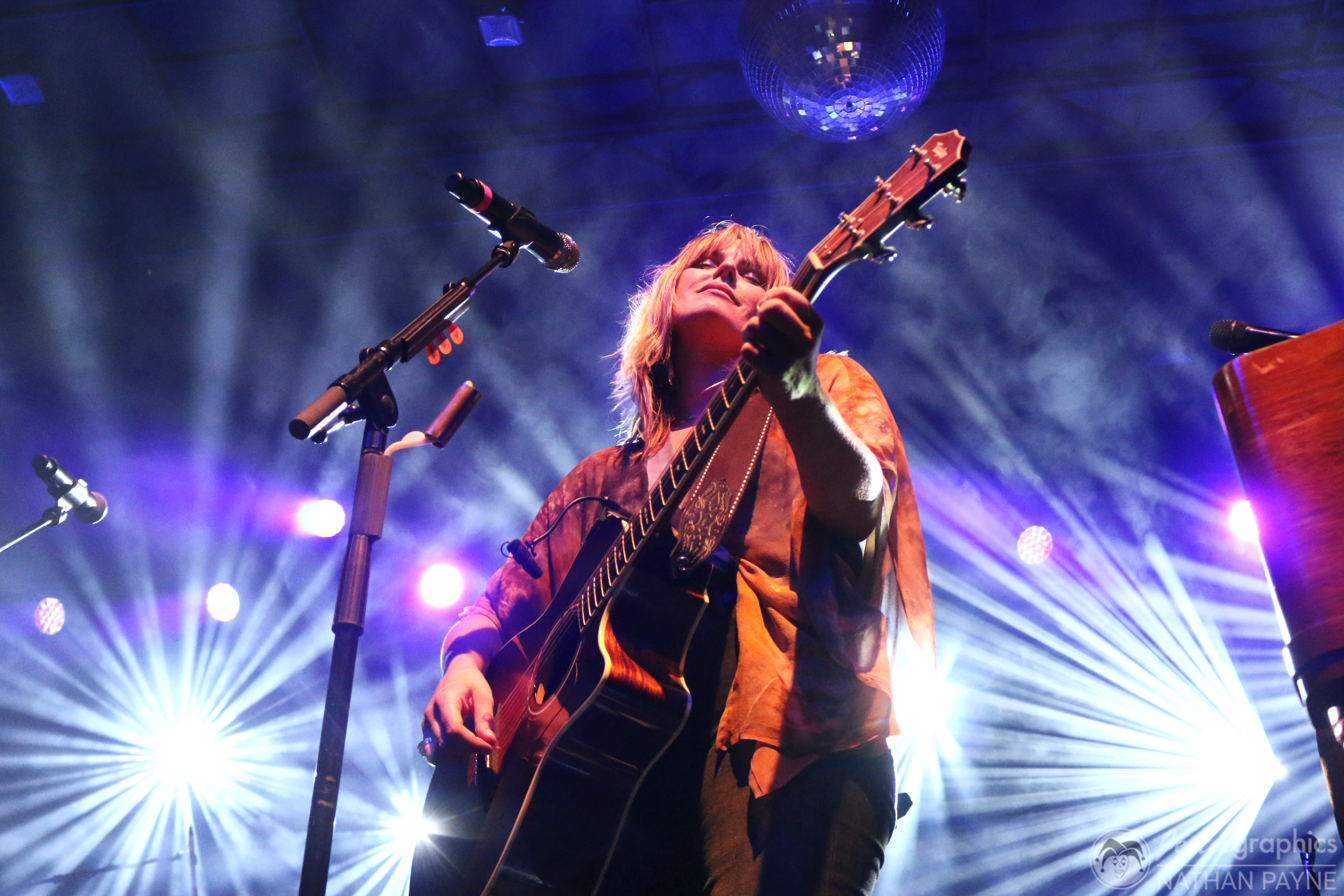
- Potter in 2019

Background information
- Born: Grace Evelyn Potter; June 20, 1983 (age 43); Waitsfield, Vermont
- Genres: Rock; pop
- Occupations: Singer-songwriter; musician
- Instruments: Vocals; keyboards; guitar
- Years active: 2002–present
- Label: Fantasy
- Formerly of: Grace Potter and the Nocturnals
- Spouse(s): Matt Burr (m. 2013; div. 2015) Eric Valentine (m. 2017)
- Website: gracepotter.com

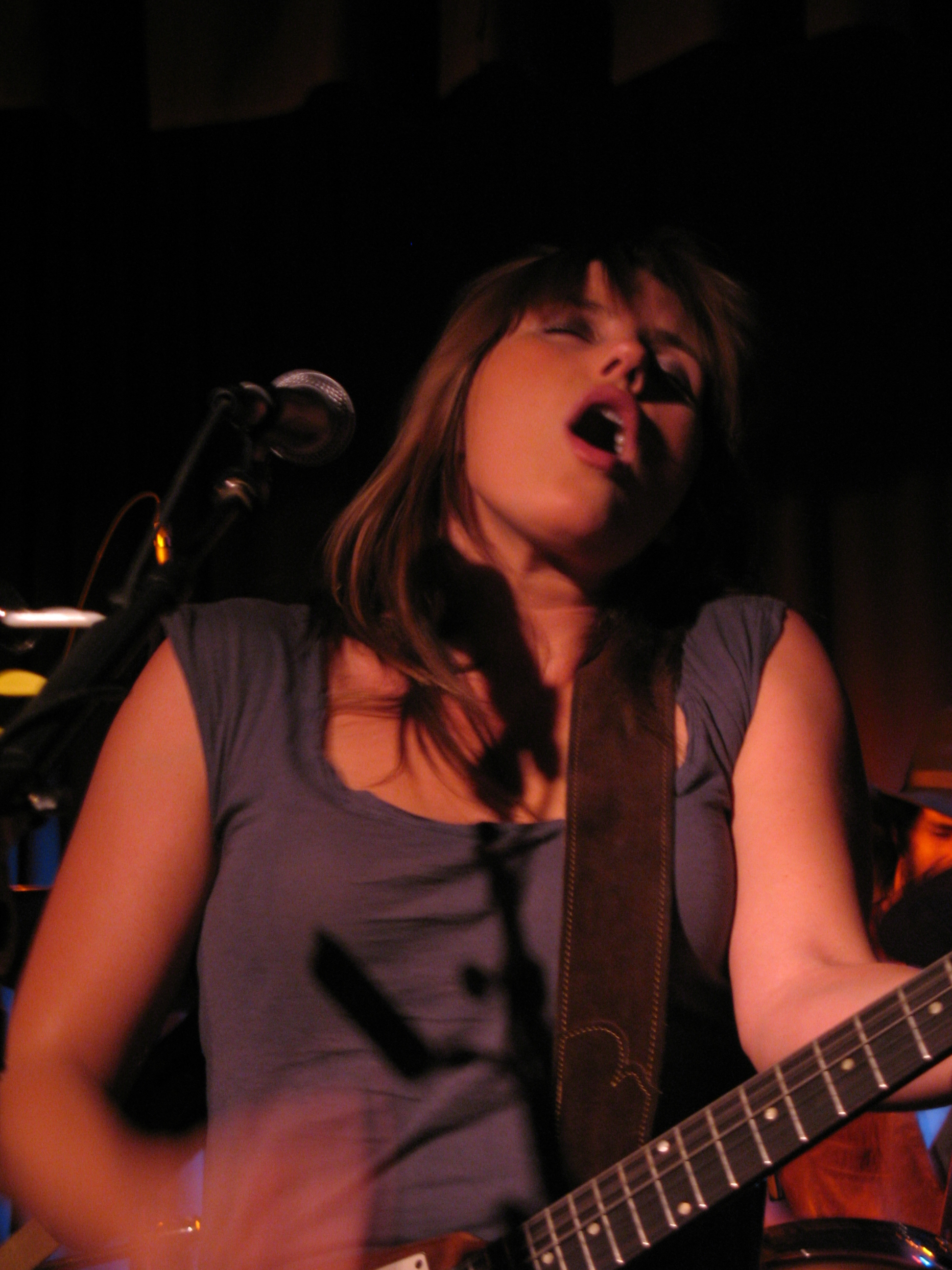
Grace Potter in concert in 2007

Grace Evelyn Potter (born June 20, 1983) is an American singer-songwriter and musician. She has released six solo albums: Red Shoe Rebel (2002), Original Soul (2004), Midnight (2015), Daylight (2019), Mother Road (2023), and Trespasser (2026). She has also released four studio albums with Grace Potter and the Nocturnals, a band she formed in 2002, which disbanded in 2015 upon her divorce from her bandmate: Nothing but the Water (2005), This Is Somewhere (2007), Grace Potter and the Nocturnals (2010), and The Lion the Beast the Beat (2012).

== Early life ==
Potter was born on June 20, 1983, in Waitsfield, Vermont. Both of her parents, Peggy and Sparky Potter, were involved in professional woodworking; her mother was also a piano teacher. Her older sister, Charlotte Potter, is an artist who works with glass. She was exposed to the arts at a very young age and was encouraged by her parents to work with her hands. Potter grew up legally blind in one eye and got bad grades. She was expelled from bands because she could not read music.

In 1999, while attending Harwood Union High School, Potter was chosen to attend the three-week Governor's Institute on the Arts session at Castleton University. There, she learned from artists such as poet Verandah Porche.

She attended to St. Lawrence University, but dropped out after her sophomore year to pursue a career in music.

== Music ==
=== Beginnings and Grace Potter and the Nocturnals (2002–2015) ===
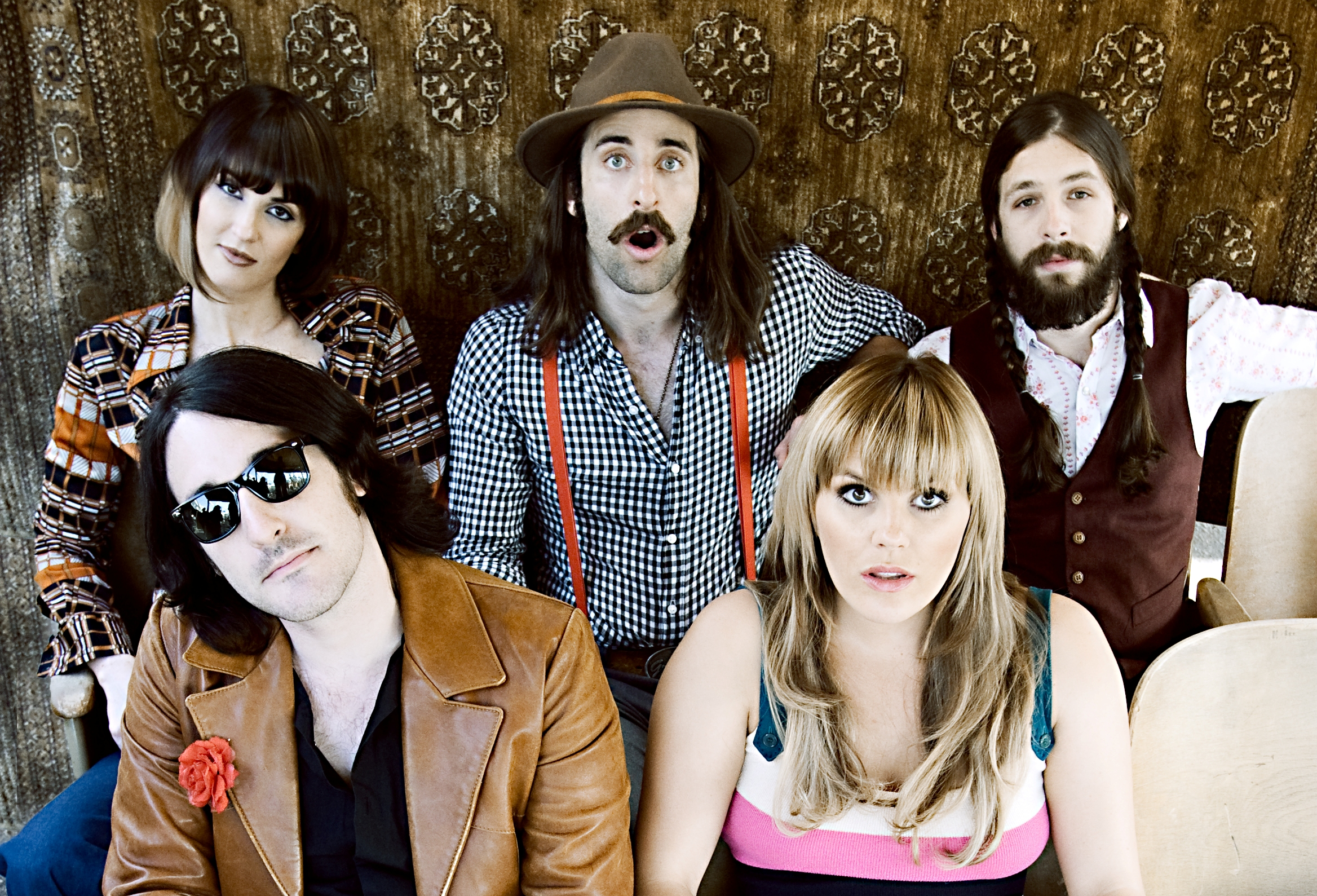
Grace Potter and the Nocturnals in 2009

While in college, Potter met Matt Burr, a drummer and her future husband, who convinced her to form a band. They started playing at the Java Barn. The band could only find space to rehearse at 2AM, inspiring the band name, Grace Potter and the Nocturnals. They would stay up all night rehearsing and then go to class. The band included Scott Tournet on guitars (including slide guitar and harmonica), drummer Matthew Burr, Michael Libramento on bass guitar and keyboards, and Benny Yurco on electric guitar and vocals. Bryan Dondero played bass guitar, upright bass, and mandolin with the group until his departure in early 2009.

In 2002, she released her first album, Red Shoe Rebel. Her second album, Original Soul followed in 2004.

The group independently recorded and released one album, Nothing but the Water in 2005 with sound engineer Lane Gibson, who recorded and mastered Original Soul (2004). The band signed a deal with Hollywood Records in December 2005 and re-released Nothing but the Water in May 2006.

In 2005, the band was nominated in two categories at the Boston Music Awards, for "Best Local Female Artist" and also for "Best New Local Act".

In 2006, the band won the Jammy Award for "Best New Groove". At the Boston Music Awards, the band was nominated for Album of the Year (major) for the re-release of Nothing but the Water and Potter was nominated for Vocalist of the Year.

The group released its second album, This Is Somewhere, on August 7, 2007, on Hollywood Records and was the opening act for Gov't Mule on its October and November North American tour.

In August 2007, the band made appearances on The Tonight Show with Jay Leno, Good Morning America, and The Late Late Show with Craig Ferguson.

In June 2008, the band was the opening act for the Dave Matthews Band as well as for The Black Crowes.

In 2010, the band's cover version of Jefferson Airplane's song "White Rabbit" was included on Almost Alice, the companion soundtrack for Tim Burton's feature film Alice in Wonderland.

The group released their third studio recording, Grace Potter and the Nocturnals, in June 2010. It included the song "Paris (Ooh La La)". On the album, Catherine Popper replaced Libramento on bass.

In 2011, Potter earned her first Grammy nomination for Best Country Duo/Group Performance for "You and Tequila" with Kenny Chesney.

In July 2011, Potter was a guest on Chelsea Handler's show Chelsea Lately.

In July 2012, she joined The Flaming Lips during their show at The Lyric in Oxford, Mississippi, which was part of their attempt to break the Guinness World Record for Most Concerts Played in different cities in a 24-hour period. That same year, Potter and The Flaming Lips collaborated on a recording of "My Mechanical Friend", which she also wrote, for the companion soundtrack to Disney and Tim Burton's film Frankenweenie. In 2014, she contributed to their cover of The Beatles' "Good Morning Good Morning" for their With a Little Help from My Fwends album.

Potter made guest appearances on The Chew in November 2012 and December 2015.

=== Solo career ===
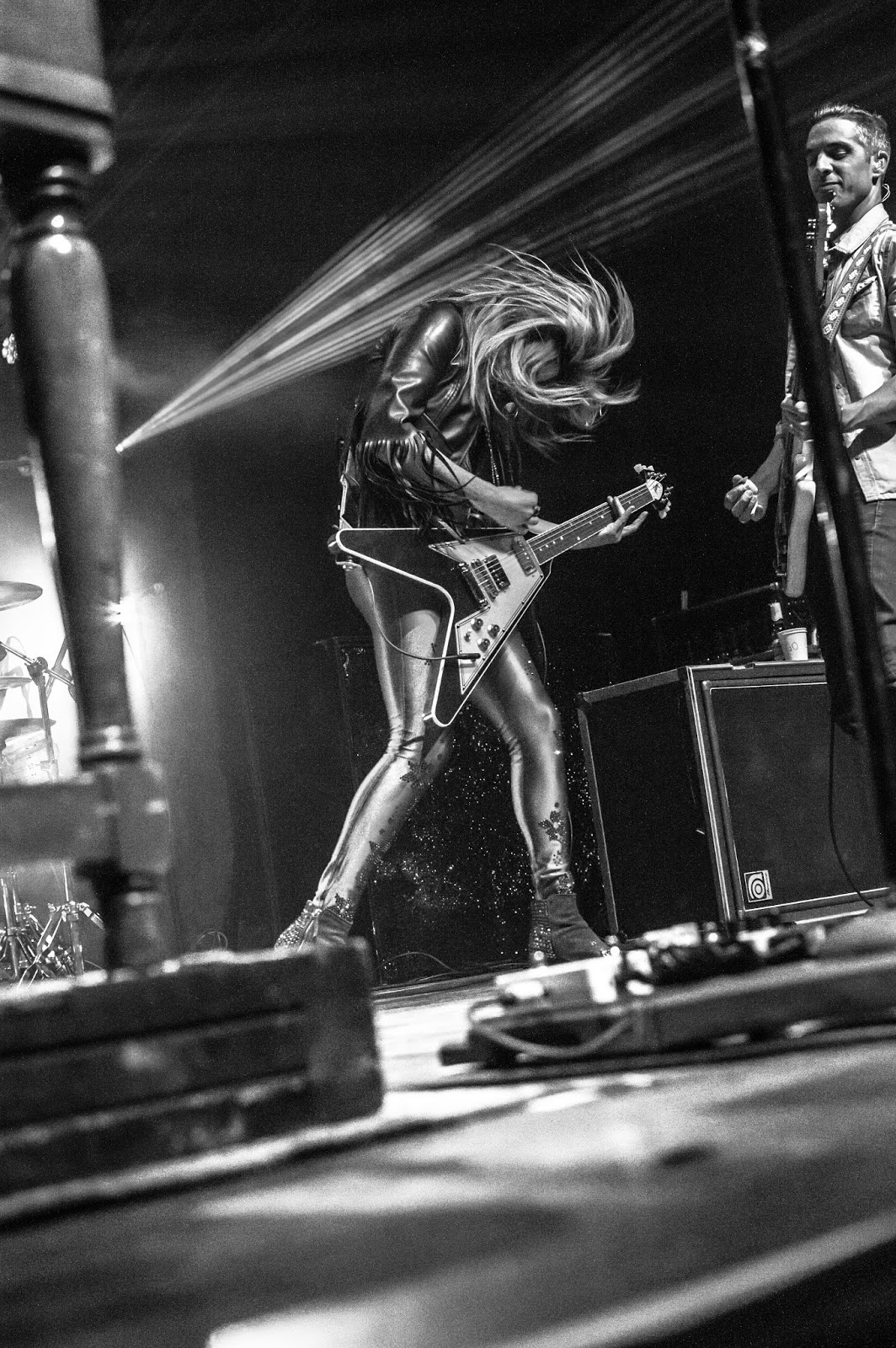
Potter performing in 2015

After Potter's divorce from Burr, the band disbanded.

In June 2015, Potter was the opening act for the Rolling Stones during the Zip Code Tour, and joined them onstage to perform "Gimme Shelter".

Potter's next solo album, Midnight, was released in August 2015 on Hollywood Records, produced by Eric Valentine. Several notable artists contributed to the album: Rayland Baxter, Audra Mae, Noelle Scaggs of Fitz and the Tantrums, Wayne Coyne of The Flaming Lips, and Nick Oliveri of Queens of the Stone Age.

In September 2015, Potter performed The Star-Spangled Banner during the New England Patriots' season opener.

In 2016, her collaboration on the song "Wild Child" on Kenny Chesney's album The Big Revival garnered award nominations from the Academy of Country Music, CMT Music, and the Country Music Association.

Potter was the musical guest on the episode of Conan that aired on January 25, 2016.

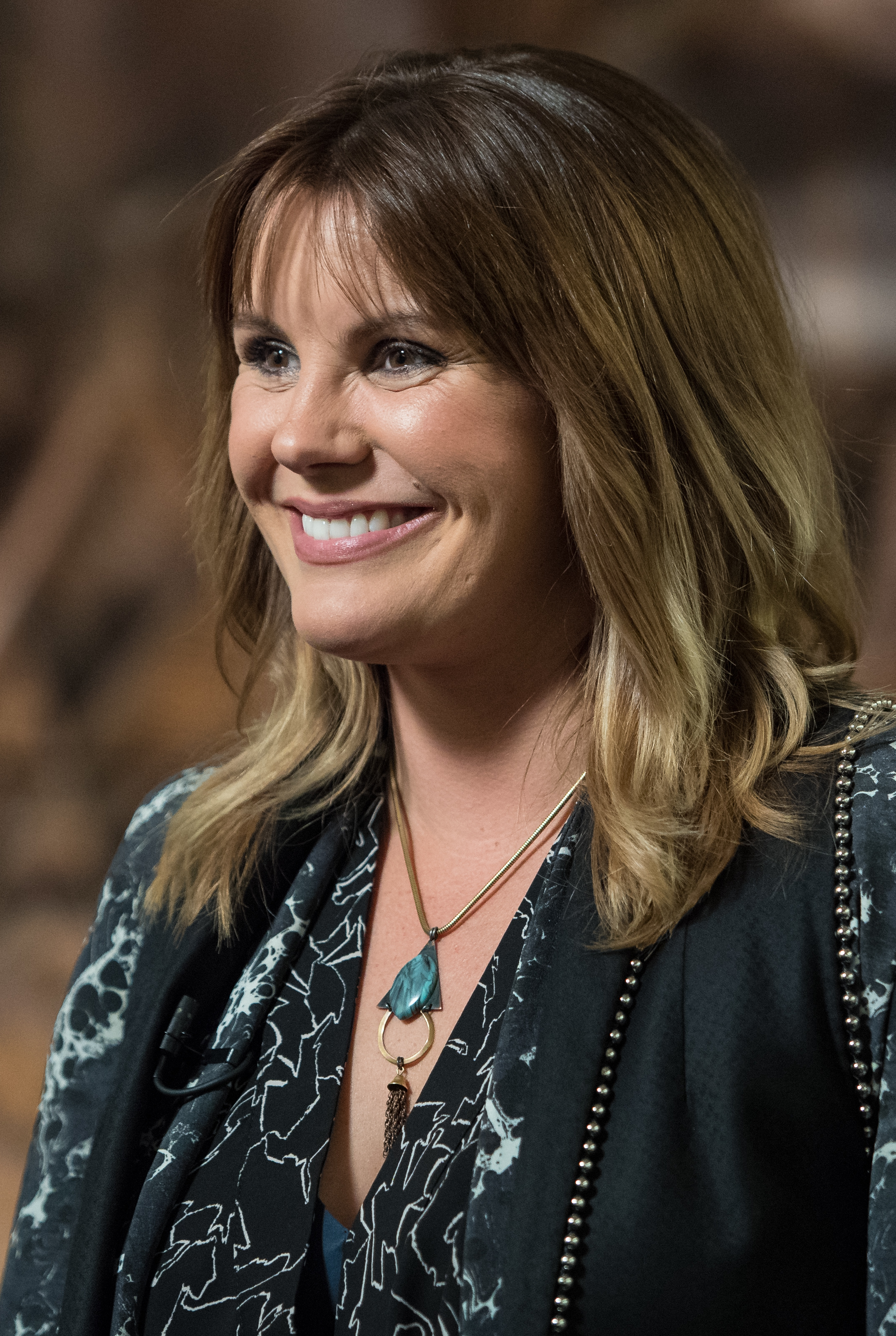
Potter in 2018

Daylight, produced by Eric Valentine, was released in October 2019 on Fantasy Records. It features guest musicians Jess Wolfe and Holly Laessig of Lucius, and Benmont Tench.

In 2020, during the COVID-19 pandemic, Potter launched weekly streaming media performances from her home in California and her childhood home in Vermont and performed a special episode on the set of the original Star Trek.

Potter's fourth solo album, Mother Road, was released in August 2023 on Fantasy Records.

=== Artistry ===
On guitars, Potter primarily plays the Gibson Flying V; however, she also plays classical guitars with nylon strings. On keys, she plays the Hammond organ. Her voice has been described as soulful and bluesy and she has been compared to Bonnie Raitt and Janis Joplin. She has also been described as a "grittier Patty Griffin".

=== Tracks used in film and television ===
Potter's song "Apologies", was used in an episode of One Tree Hill; Potter also made a cameo appearance as a street performer in the episode. "Apologies" was also featured on All My Children, Kyle XY, and Brothers & Sisters.

The song "Falling or Flying" was featured on ER and Grey's Anatomy and appeared on Volume 3 of the latter's soundtrack.

In 2010, Potter re-recorded "Something That I Want" with altered lyrics for the end credits to Disney's animated feature Tangled.

In December 2011, Potter was the voice of Carol in Disney's Prep & Landing: Naughty vs. Nice, for which she also wrote and recorded "Naughty, Naughty Children (Better Start Actin' Nice)."

In 2011, the song "Paris (Ooh la la)" was featured in the Season 2 promo for the TNT television series Rizzoli & Isles.

In 2012, the song "Nothing but the Water" was used in trailers for the short-lived 2012 ABC drama Last Resort.

Potter's version of the Stealers Wheel song "Stuck in the Middle with You" was used as the theme song for the Netflix series Grace and Frankie (2015–2020).

In June 2017, her song "Instigators" was featured in the video game Dirt 4.

In 2019, the song "The Lion the Beast the Beat" was featured in the season 2 episode of Cloak & Dagger titled "Vikingtown Sound".

== Personal life ==
Potter is legally blind in one eye and is bisexual. Potter said that she does not belong to any religious group but values a spiritual life.

Potter married bandmate Matt Burr on May 11, 2013. They divorced in 2015, at which time the Nocturnals disbanded. Potter married her current husband, record producer Eric Valentine, in 2017. They have one son, born in 2018.

In 2011, Potter founded the Grand Point North music festival in Burlington, Vermont. Potter has supported and fundraised for the Alzheimer's Association in honor of her paternal grandfather's battle with Alzheimer's disease. In June 2015, Potter was presented the "ASCAP Harry Chapin Vanguard Award" by WhyHunger for her work towards defeating world hunger. Potter lives in Topanga, California. She previously lived in Laurel Canyon, Los Angeles, where she owned a 1920s Spanish bungalow that she refurbished; she sold the house in 2017.

== Discography ==
=== Solo ===
List of studio albums, with selected details and chart positions
Title	Album details	Peak chart positions		
Title	Album details	US	US Rock	US Taste.
Red Shoe Rebel	Released: 2002; Label: Dream On Productions; Track list: 1. "Red Shoe Rebel"; 2. "Moondance"; 3. "Time After Time"; 4. "Angel From Montgomery"; 5. "Landslide"; 6. "Kuma Ka-ya-ya"; 7. "He's Already Made Up His Mind"; 8. "Don't Stand So Close to Me"; 9. "Lay Down Brother"; 10. "My Fifth Pocket"; 11. "Tink's Cafe"	—	—	—
Original Soul	Released: May 5, 2004; Label: Grace Potter Music, Indie911; Track list: 1. "At Your Request"; 2. "Go Down Low"; 3. "Crazy Parade"; 4. "I Chose You"; 5. "Deliverance Road"; 6. "Gumbo Moon"; 7. "Hidden Superstition"; 8. "Moonbeams"; 9. "No Good, Mean Old, Lowdown Lover Man"; 10. "Somebody Fix Me"; 11. "Driving Blind"; 12. "Bull in a China Shop"; 13. "Kissing in a Tree"	—	—	—
Midnight	Released: August 14, 2015; Label: Hollywood	26	4	3
Daylight	Released: October 25, 2019; Label: Fantasy	74	9	20
Mother Road	August 18, 2023; Label: Fantasy	—	—	—
Trespasser	August 21, 2026			
"—" denotes releases that did not chart

=== Singles ===
==== As lead artist ====
List of singles as lead artist showing year released, selected chart positions, and album name
Title	Year	Peak chart positions						Certifications	Album
Title	Year	US	US AAA	US Country	US Country Airplay	CAN	CAN Country	Certifications	Album
"I Want Something That I Want"	2008	—	—	—	—	—	—		Music from One Tree Hill
"Wild Child" (with Kenny Chesney)	2015	56	—	9	1	69	3	RIAA: Gold	The Big Revival
"Alive Tonight"	2015	—	29	—	—	—	—		Midnight
"Empty Heart"	2015	—	15	—	—	—	—		Midnight
"Love Is Love"	2019	—	8	—	—	—	—		Daylight
"Back to Me" (featuring Lucius)	2019	—	28	—	—	—	—		Daylight
"Mother Road"	2023	—	—	—	—	—	—		Mother Road
"Good Time"	2023	—	14	—	—	—	—		Mother Road
"Love Me Not"	2026	—	8	—	—	—	—		Trespasser
"—" denotes releases that did not chart

==== As featured artist ====
List of singles as featured artist showing year released, selected chart positions, certifications, and album name
Single	Year	Peak chart positions					Certifications	Album
Single	Year	US	US Country	US Country Airplay	CAN	CAN Country	Certifications	Album
"You and Tequila" (Kenny Chesney featuring Grace Potter)	2011	33	3	3	62	5	RIAA: 4× Platinum	Hemingway's Whiskey

=== Other appearances ===
List of other appearances showing year released, other performing artists, and album name
Title	Year	Other performer(s)	Album	Note(s)
"Wellwisher"	2009	Phonograph	OKNO	
"Ordinary Man"	2009	Gregory Douglass	Battler	
"Something That I Want"	2010	none	Tangled	also credited as co-writer
"Naughty Naughty Children (Better Start Actin' Nice)"	2011	none	Prep & Landing: Naughty vs Nice: The Complete Soundtrack	also credited as co-writer
"My Mechanical Friend"	2012	The Flaming Lips	Frankenweenie Unleashed!	
"You and Tequila (Live at Red Rocks Amphitheatre)"	2012	Kenny Chesney	Welcome to the Fishbowl	
"I Shall Be Released"	2013	Don Was, Matt Burr	Love for Levon: Benefit to Save the Barn	
"Whisper in Your Soul"	2013	Gov't Mule	Shout!	
"Good Morning Good Morning"	2014	The Flaming Lips, Zorch, Treasure Mammal	With a Little Help from My Fwends	
"Gold Dust Woman"	2015	Warren Haynes, Railroad Earth	Ashes & Dust	

=== with Grace Potter and the Nocturnals ===
Studio albums

- Nothing but the Water
- This Is Somewhere
- Grace Potter and the Nocturnals
- The Lion the Beast the Beat
