= Paris (Ooh La La) =

Single by Grace Potter and the Nocturnals

from the album Grace Potter and the Nocturnals
- Released: 2010
- Genre: Rock, hard rock, funk rock
- Length: 3:15
- Label: Hollywood
- Songwriter(s): Grace Potter
- Producer(s): Mark Batson

Grace Potter and the Nocturnals singles chronology
"Medicine" (2010)	"Paris (Ooh La La)" (2010)	"Never Go Back" (2012)

Music video
- "Paris (Ooh La La)" on YouTube

"Paris (Ooh La La)" is the second single from Grace Potter and the Nocturnals' eponymous third studio album.

== Personnel ==
Adapted credits from the booklet.

- Grace Potter – lead vocals, electric guitar
- Scott Tournet – lead guitar
- Benny Yurco – rhythm guitar
- Catherine Popper – bass guitar
- Matt Burr – drums
- Mary Broome – Lyrics (French)

== Covers ==
- Brian Fuente, a contestant on the second season of the U.S. version of The Voice, covered the song in his blind audition.
- Ashley De La Rosa, another contestant on the second season of the U.S. version of The Voice, covered the song for her last chance performance.
- Jennel Garcia, a contestant on the second season of the U.S. version of The X Factor, covered the song in her audition.
- Amanda Brown a contestant on the third season of the U.S. version of The Voice, covered the song during the knockout rounds.
- Pamela Anderson danced to this song in the 15th season of Dancing with the Stars.
- Fatin Shidqia, a contestant on the first season of the Indonesian version of The X Factor, covered the song in her bootcamp.
- Emily Piriz, a contestant on the thirteenth season of American Idol, covered this song during "Rush Week," a round featuring the top 20 contestants of the season. The song was well received by the judges, but Harry Connick Jr. raised some concerns as to whether or not she wanted to perform rather racy songs in the future.
- Kat Perkins, a contestant on the sixth season of the U.S. version of The Voice, covered the song as her Instant Save song during the second week of the live shows.
- Allie Keck, a contestant on the twenty-third season of the U.S. version of The Voice, covered the song in her blind audition.
- Nutsa, a contestant on the twenty-first season of American Idol covered the song in the Top 26 Hawaii Week.
