= Nothing but the Water =

Studio album by Grace Potter and the Nocturnals
- Released: May 10, 2005
- Genre: Blues, roots rock
- Label: Hollywood

Grace Potter and the Nocturnals chronology
Nothing but the Water (2005)	Live Oh Five (2005)

Nothing but the Water is Grace Potter and the Nocturnals' first studio album. It was released on May 10, 2005 independently by the band. The album was re-released with re-mastered tracks and a bonus DVD on May 23, 2006 after the band signed with Hollywood Records in late 2005.

== Reception ==
Professional ratings
Review scores
Source	Rating
Allmusic	3.5/5 stars

The album was positively received on Allmusic.

== Track listing ==
All tracks are written by Grace Potter, except where noted.

1. "Toothbrush and My Table" (Potter, Matt Burr) - 4:31
2. "Some Kind of Ride" - 3:40
3. "Ragged Company" - 4:59
4. "Left Behind" (Potter, Burr, Bryan Dondero, Scott Tournet) - 3:39
5. "Treat Me Right" (Potter, Burr, Dondero, Tournet) - 4:27
6. "Sweet Hands" - 3:37
7. "Joey" (Potter, Burr, Dondero, Tournet) - 5:17
8. "2:22" (Potter, Tournet) - 4:32
9. "All but One" - 4:53
10. "Below the Beams" (Potter, Burr, Dondero, Tournet) - 1:33
11. "Nothing but the Water (I)" - 2:44
12. "Nothing but the Water (II)" - 5:16

== Personnel ==
Adapted from AllMusic and the booklet.

The Nocturnals

- Grace Potter - lead vocals, keyboards, Hammond organ, tambourine
- Scott Tournett - acoustic, electric & resonator guitars, backing vocals
- Bryan Dondero - bass guitar, upright bass
- Matt Burr - drums, percussion, trash cans

Additional personnel

- Jennifer Crowell - tambourine and backing vocals (Tracks 7, 11 and 12)
