= Java Barn =

Music venue

The Java Barn is a student-run music venue and former coffeehouse, established in 1993 and located at St. Lawrence University (SLU).

== The Payson Coffeehouse ==
In the early-mid 1980s, there was a popular folk music scene, especially in northern New York state, known as the "North Country." At SLU, groups of students, interested in having live music at the school, petitioned and established a coffeehouse in Payson Hall, one of the school's buildings. A theme house was set up at 3 University Avenue. While shows typically took place on Friday and Saturday nights, and the tenants routinely made the 10-minute "trek" between their residence and Payson to facilitate the shows.

== The Java Barn ==
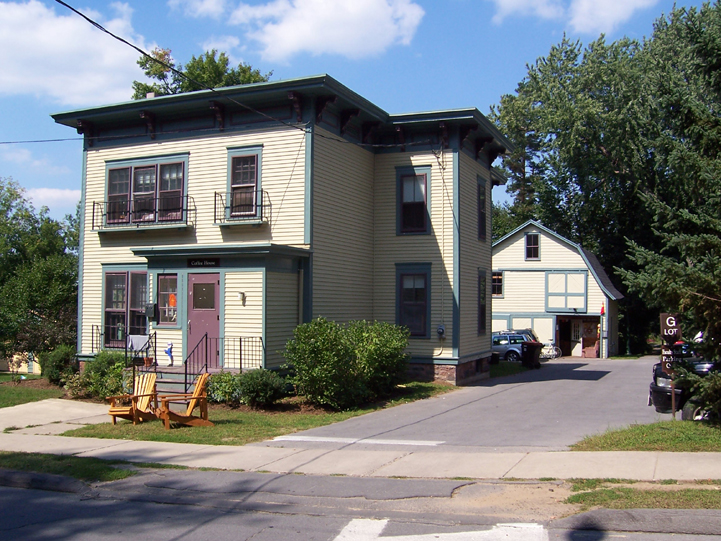
View of the Coffee House and Java Barn, shortly before they closed

In 1992, Payson Hall was renovated into SLU's admissions building. A new venue had to be established, and student Jamie Schapiro ('94) spearheaded the search and co-founded the new coffee house. The chosen candidate was an old barn located behind 5 University Avenue. The new residence and venue was one house up from where the current students were living. The house was named the Coffee House, and the barn was christened as the Java House and later named Java Barn. Operating between the fall 1993 and the spring of 2006, the Barn's location was popular due to its proximity of being on the border of the SLU campus, near the town center. This brought about some interaction with the community, and students enjoyed the distance from the main campus and their studies.

== The Winning Health Center ==
Towards the end of the 90s, the nature of shows at Java began to change: louder, amplified rock gigs replaced the quieter acoustic folk concerts. Because of Java's proximity to the Elm St. neighborhood, a petition was delivered to President Sullivan, protesting the loudness of the Barn. After much deliberation between the members and the administration, it was decided that Java would have to be moved. This new location would be the Winning Health Center, about 50 feet from the Payson Coffeehouse. To commemorate its closing, Java's annual festival, "Java Jam", would be the Barn's last show. On May 6, 2006, the Ryan Montbleau Band was the final artist to play in the venue, and the Barn was closed forever.

The vacant Winning Health Center was selected for the relocation. The Health Center's location in the center of campus put Java far away from the possibility of neighbors complaining about noise, and it would be easy to reconfigure the building to suit Java's needs. In an interesting return to the days of the Payson Coffeehouse, students would continue to live at 5 University Ave., and would make "the trek" to the Health Center for shows.

This was originally proposed to be a temporary location, since the demolition of the Health Center & Artery buildings have been in the university's master plans for years. This demolition would ultimately create green space that was lost due to the construction of the Student Center. The university decided to tear down the Health Center Venue in 2010, and that year the Health Center venue housed its final concert.

== Current Java Venue ==
After the closing of the Health Center venue, the university relocated Java to an old biology lab on the south side of campus, next to Brown Hall. The Java house of 2010 painted the characteristic inside of the venue in bright, psychedelic colors and patterns. Currently, shows happen on either Thursdays or Saturday nights. There are 12 members who live in the house and they put on every aspect of the shows. For current information, visit the Java Barn Instagram page.
