= Grace Potter and the Nocturnals (album) =

Studio album by Grace Potter and the Nocturnals
- Released: June 8, 2010
- Studio: Westlake Recording Studios (Los Angeles)
- Genre: Roots rock, hard rock, rock and roll
- Length: 51:09
- Label: Hollywood
- Producer: Mark Batson

Grace Potter and the Nocturnals chronology
Live in Skowhegan (2008)	Grace Potter and the Nocturnals (2010)	Live from the Legendary Sun Studio (2012)

Grace Potter and the Nocturnals is the third studio album by American rock band Grace Potter and the Nocturnals, released on June 8, 2010. The album is the band's first release since the inclusion of two new members, rhythm guitarist Benny Yurco and bassist Catherine Popper. The album was originally titled "Medicine" after the third track on the album, and was promoted as such in numerous interviews and early reviews, but was changed shortly after the replacement of producer T Bone Burnett in favor of Mark Batson.

The album debuted at #19 on the Billboard Top 200 Albums for the week ending June 13, 2010.

== Critical reception ==
Professional ratings
Review scores
Source	Rating
AllMusic	3.5/5 stars
American Music Channel	4.5/5 stars
Rolling Stone	3/5 stars
New York Post	4/5 stars
Boston Herald	9/10 stars

The album was released to generally favorable reviews, scoring a 63 on Metacritic. Billboard magazine gave the album a positive review, stating that "Grace Potter & the Nocturnals' new self-titled release finds frontwoman Potter and her band in full bloom, hammering out hook-heavy rock tracks with a confident, natural sound." Giving the album three out of five stars, Rolling Stone magazine comments, "Potter's youthfulness can make for flower-soup lyrics but backlit by a no-nonsense band that massages Memphis grooves, light rock and pinot-noir reggae, it all bursts with promise." The Guardian enjoyed the band's harder rocking songs while criticizing some of the slower ones. The Guardian remarks that "[g]enerally, the bluesy, Southernised rockers (Medicine, Only Love) make more of an impression than the power balladry (Colors), while an anomalous wallow in country-rock sentimentality (Things I Never Needed) feels like it was tacked on because they realised they needed a slow one."

== Track listing ==
All tracks are written by Grace Potter and Mark Batson, except where noted.

No.	Title	Writer(s)	Length
1.	"Paris (Ooh La La)"	Potter	3:15
2.	"Oasis"		4:41
3.	"Medicine"	Potter, Matt Burr, Scott Tournet	4:06
4.	"Goodbye Kiss"	Potter	3:33
5.	"Tiny Light"		4:43
6.	"Colors"	Potter	5:15
7.	"Only Love"		3:22
8.	"Money"	Potter, David Poe	2:54
9.	"One Short Night"	Potter	3:50
10.	"Low Road"		4:39
11.	"That Phone"		3:18
12.	"Hot Summer Night"		3:22
13.	"Things I Never Needed"	Potter	4:11

iTunes bonus track
No.	Title	Writer(s)	Length
14.	"Fooling Myself"	Potter	5:25

- The songs "Paris (Ooh La La)" and "That Phone" were used in the CW show Hart of Dixie (2011).
- "Paris (Ooh La La)" and "Hot Summer Night" were used in an episode of the MTV series Awkward (2011).
- "Paris (Ooh La La)" was used in a Rizzoli & Isles commercial.

== Personnel ==
Adapted credits from the booklet.

The Nocturnals

- Grace Potter – lead vocals, electric guitar (track 1), acoustic guitar (track 9), piano (tracks 6, 8 and 13), Hammond organ (tracks 2–12)
- Scott Tournet – lead guitar (tracks 1–3, 5–7, 10–12), backwards guitar (track 5), lap steel guitar (tracks 4, 8-9 and 13), loops (track 3), harmonica (track 4), vocals (track 3)
- Benny Yurco – rhythm guitar
- Catherine Popper – bass guitar
- Matt Burr – drums, percussion (track 3)

Additional musicians

- Mark Batson – piano (tracks 5 and 11), drum machine (track 8), hand claps (track 12), string arrangement (track 6)
- Janna Jacoby – violin (track 6)
- Kathleen Robertson – violin (track 6)
- Thomas Tally – viola (track 6)
- Peggy Baldwin – cello (track 6)

Production

- Aaron Fessel – engineer, mixing (tracks 2 and 7)
- Brian Warwick – assistant engineer
- Bobby Campbell – assistant mixer
- Michael Parnin – Pro Tools engineer
- Andrew Scheps – mixing
- Brian Gardner – mastering

Artwork

- GraphicTherapy – art direction and design
- Adrien Broom – photography

== Charts ==
Chart	Peak position
U.S. Billboard 200	19
U.S. Billboard Top Rock Albums	3
