= Grace Potter and the Nocturnals =

American rock band from Vermont

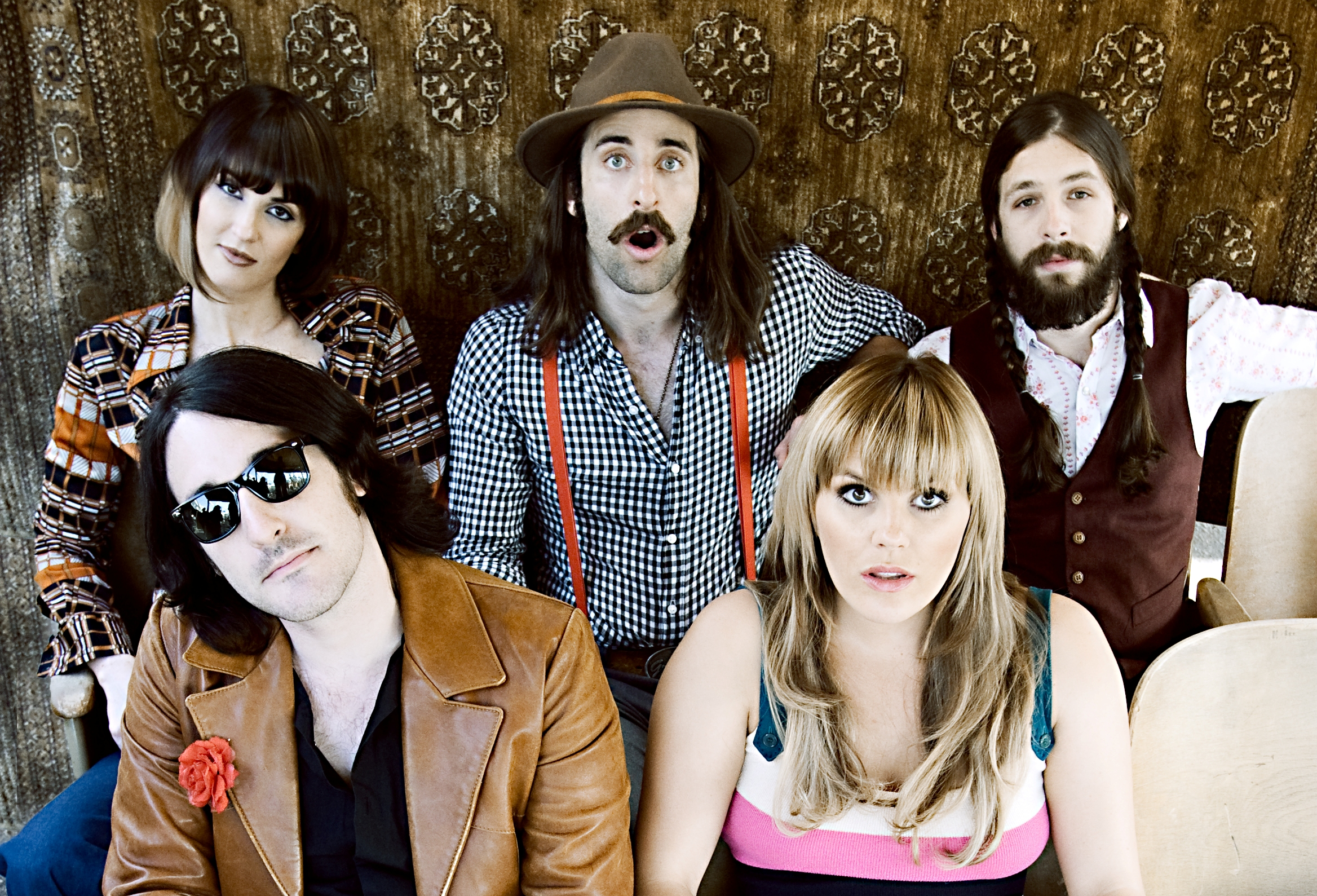
- Grace Potter and the Nocturnals in 2009

Background information
- Origin: Waitsfield, Vermont, U.S.
- Genres: Roots rock; blues rock; hard rock; folk rock
- Years active: 2002–2015
- Labels: Hollywood
- Past members: Grace Potter; Matt Burr; Scott Tournet; Bryan Dondero; Catherine Popper; Benny Yurco; Michael Libramento
- Website: gracepotter.com

Grace Potter and the Nocturnals were an American rock band from Vermont, formed in 2002 in Waitsfield by drummer Matt Burr, guitarist Scott Tournet, and singer Grace Potter. They began their career as an indie band, self-producing their albums and touring extensively in the jam bands and music festivals circuit, playing as many as 200 gigs in a year. In 2005 they signed for Hollywood Records; they have released four studio albums, encompassing rock subgenres such as blues rock, folk rock, hard rock, and alternative rock. Their third, self-titled album (2010) was a major commercial success, topping iTunes charts and receiving international attention.

The band was fronted by lead vocalist and multi-instrumentalist Grace Potter, who is known for her vocal qualities—evocative of blues rock singers like Janis Joplin, Bonnie Raitt, or Koko Taylor—as well as for her vibrant energy on stage. Besides playing with the Nocturnals, Potter has also released solo material and collaborated with other artists including Kenny Chesney and The Rolling Stones.

Potter married the band's drummer, Matt Burr, on May 11, 2013. Following their divorce in 2015, there was no further activity from the Nocturnals.

== Career ==
Grace Potter and the Nocturnals' lead vocalist was guitarist, keyboardist and organist Grace Potter (known for her skill on the Hammond organ) who attended Harwood Union High School before going on to St. Lawrence University for two years until she ultimately dropped out to pursue music professionally. In addition to lead vocals, Potter plays Hammond B3, Fender Rhodes, Wurlitzer electric piano and electric (including the Gibson Flying V) and acoustic guitars. The other members of the band are Scott Tournet, on guitars (including slide guitar) and harmonica), drummer Matthew Burr, Michael Libramento on bass guitar and keyboards, and Benny Yurco on electric guitar and vocals. Bryan Dondero played bass guitar, upright bass, and mandolin with the group until his departure in early 2009.

The band was originally formed in late 2002 when Burr saw Potter perform folk songs in a student-run venue called The Java Barn on the St. Lawrence campus. Burr approached Potter about starting a band, citing James Brown and The Band as musical influences he heard in Potter's voice and original songs. The band first existed as a trio with a bass player named Cory Beard and played an early show at a venue in Waitsfield, VT. where Scott Tournet opened the show with a female singer as a duo and joined the Nocturnals for part of a set. In the spring of 2003, Burr invited guitarist Tournet to join the group, thus cementing the founding members of the band that would become Grace Potter and the Nocturnals. Beard would no longer be in the band at that point.

The group independently recorded and released one album, Nothing but the Water in 2005 with Charlotte, VT, sound engineer Lane Gibson. An older album, Original Soul (2004), was a solo release from Potter, also recorded and mastered by Gibson. Following extensive airplay on Vermont Adult Album Alternative radio stations WNCS and WEBK, the band signed a deal with Hollywood Records in December 2005 and re-released Nothing but the Water on May 23, 2006.

In 2005, the band was nominated in two categories at the Boston Music Awards, for "Best Local Female Artist" and also for "Best New Local Act". They also performed at the awards ceremony.

In 2006, the band won the Jammy Award for "Best New Groove" and was nominated for two more Boston Music Awards: Album Of The Year (major) for the re-release of Nothing but the Water, and Female Vocalist of the Year (for frontwoman Grace Potter). Potter played Hammond Organ and sang lead vocals alongside Joe Satriani, Steve Kimock, Reed Mathis, Willy Waldman, and Stephen Perkins during that appearance. They played a cover of Neil Young's "Cortez the Killer", to a standing ovation.

The group released its second album, This Is Somewhere, on August 7, 2007 on Hollywood Records and toured that fall supporting Gov't Mule for its October and November North American tour.

Their song "Apologies" was featured on the American television shows All My Children, Kyle XY, One Tree Hill, and Brothers & Sisters, and the song "Falling or Flying" was featured on the hit drama shows ER and Grey's Anatomy and appeared on Volume 3 of the latter's soundtrack. The band backed up The Black Crowes on their North American tour in the summer of 2008.

On August 2, 2007, the band made their network television debut on NBC's The Tonight Show with Jay Leno. This was followed by appearances on ABC's Good Morning America on August 7, 2007 and CBS' The Late Late Show with Craig Ferguson on August 10, 2007.

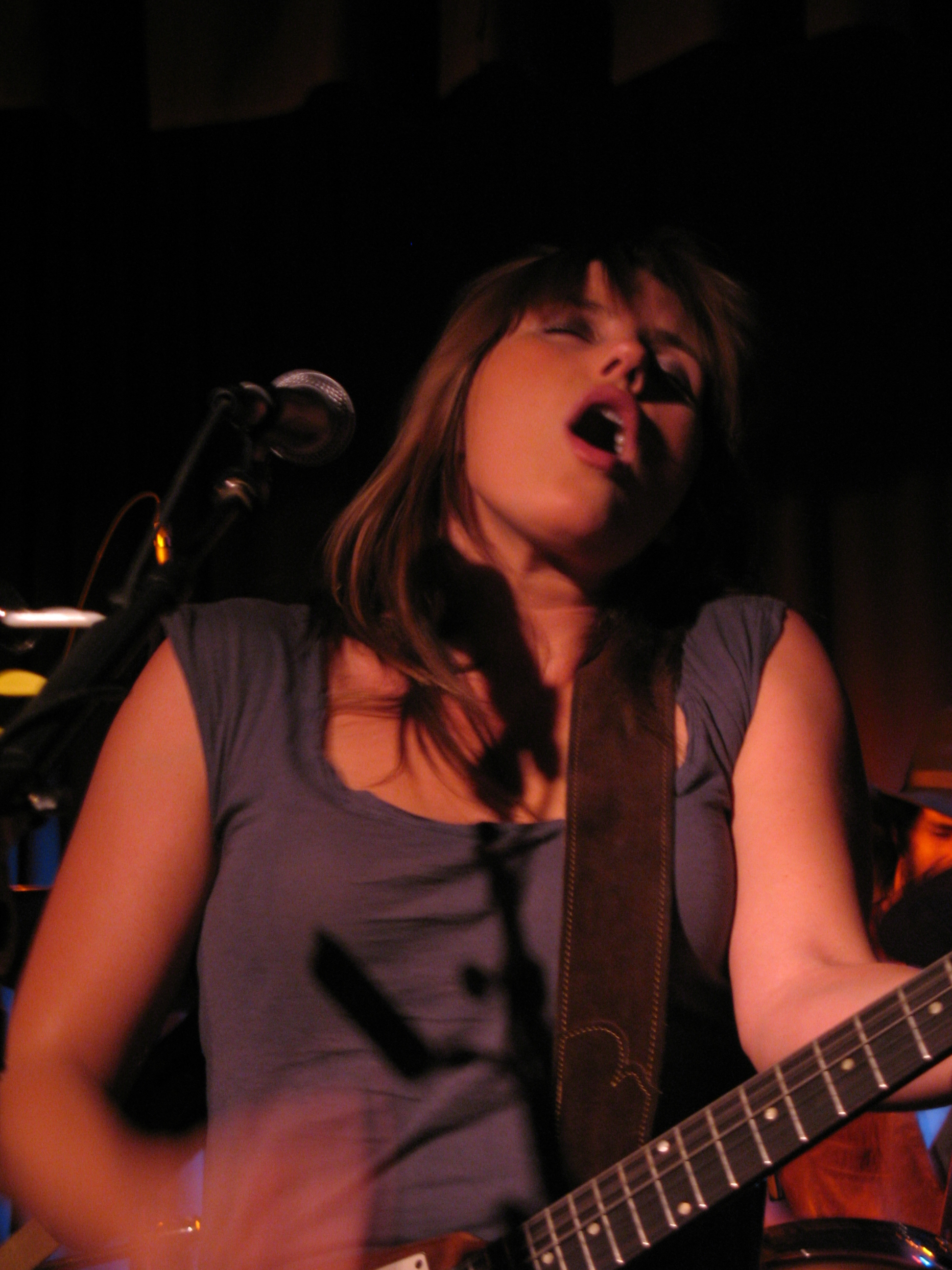
Grace Potter in concert in 2007

In 2008, the group opened for the Dave Matthews Band for three dates: a two-night stand at the Saratoga Performing Arts Center in Saratoga Springs, New York June 20–21, and June 24 at the Tweeter Center in Mansfield, Massachusetts. The band played a full set at the Mile High Music Festival on July 20. In November 2008, Bose began using "Ain't No Time" in their North American iPod SoundDock sales displays.

Hollywood Records released the news on May 11, 2009 that T-Bone Burnett would be producing a new project with Potter, tentatively scheduled for fall of 2009. The project was deemed as a solo collaboration and both Potter and Burnett spoke very highly of the project to the press. By November 13, the band posted a new release date for the album, pushing it back to spring 2010. Hollywood Records shelved the T-Bone Burnett album in favor of a true band album, released June 8, 2010.[17] The album was produced by Mark Batson, with "Tiny Light" as the first single. The video for "Tiny Light" was shot in Los Angeles during February 2010 with director Paul Minor.

During the 2009 Bonnaroo Music Festival, Grace Potter and the Nocturnals, along with playing their own set, joined Gov't Mule and moe. on stage for their shows. Potter and Tournet joined Gov't Mule onstage, while with moe. they replaced the band members one by one during moe.'s five-hour set and played four of their own songs to be rejoined by moe. in a musical collaboration known as "A Hostile Takeover".

In 2010, the band appeared on Almost Alice, the companion soundtrack for Tim Burton's feature film Alice in Wonderland, with a cover version of Jefferson Airplane's song "White Rabbit". The band appeared at Hangout Music Festival on May 15, 2010 in Gulf Shores, Alabama. Potter appeared as a guest on stage with The Preservation Hall Jazz Band, singing vocals for "St. James Infirmary Blues" and joined Gov't Mule on a cover of "Gold Dust Woman". In late May 2010, Vermont specialty chocolate maker Lake Champlain Chocolates created a new chocolate bar in conjunction with Grace Potter called Grace Under Fire. The dark chocolate contains pistachios and red pepper flakes.

On the eve of their eponymous album release date, the band announced on Facebook and Twitter that they were going to perform a free concert on Burlington, Vermont's Church Street Marketplace the following day. The hour-long concert attracted thousands of viewers and became a huge local media story. The band sold merchandise and hosted a meet and greet with fans for three hours following the concert.

The group released their third studio recording, Grace Potter and the Nocturnals, on June 8, 2010. Catherine Popper was brought in to replace Dondero on bass. On July 19, 2010, as a launch to their second single from Grace Potter and the Nocturnals, the band premiered the video to "Paris (Ooh La La)" on Hulu.

Potter also wrote a track titled "Something That I Want", which was performed on One Tree Hill. In 2010, she re-wrote some of the lyrics and Disney chose it to be featured during the closing credits of their 50th animated feature Tangled, which Potter sang by herself. The movie soundtrack was released on November 16, 2010. The group made an appearance at the 80/35 Music Festival in Des Moines on July 3, 2011.

On December 3, 2011, Grace Potter performed a live set for "Guitar Center Sessions" on DirecTV. The episode included an interview with program host, Nic Harcourt. On January 1, 2012, the group recorded a cover of the Beatles' classic hit, "All You Need Is Love," and released it as a single. On February 9, 2012, Grace Potter announced the title of their upcoming fourth studio album, The Lion the Beast the Beat, noting that they collaborated with The Black Keys member Dan Auerbach.

On October 3, 2012 Grace Potter appeared at the "Love for Levon" tribute show to Levon Helm held at the Izod Center in East Rutherford, NJ. Saying that "(t)his is one of the great pleasures of my life," Potter performed "I Shall Be Released" by Bob Dylan. This song was performed by The Band accompanied by many guest stars such as Ringo Starr and Bob Dylan in "The Last Waltz" concert held on November 25, 1976 at the Winterland Ballroom in San Francisco.

On May 11, 2013, bandmates Grace Potter and Matt Burr were married.

In April 2015, Scott Tournet posted to social media that he would not be touring in support of Potter's solo album. In November 2016, Tournet clarified in an interview with JamBase that he doesn't "play in that group anymore. I was a big part of that group and it was a big part of me but that chapter is officially over."

On June 23, 2015, Potter was presented the "ASCAP Harry Chapin Vanguard Award" by World Hunger Year for "her endless work towards defeating world hunger". In 2017, Potter and Burr announced their divorce, with Burr departing from the band shortly thereafter.

=== Collaborations ===
Recorded between tours during the summer and fall of 2004 at the band's Waitsfield rehearsal space, Depart So Slow featured the songwriting of singer/guitarist Scott Taylor with Grace Potter and the Nocturnals providing musical backing. It was engineered and mixed by Nocturnals guitarist Scott Tournet.

In 2008, Potter recorded a version of "I Want Something That I Want" with Bethany Joy Galeotti (One Tree Hill) on a track from the acoustic sessions from One Tree Hill. In addition to this collaboration, Potter also served as guest composer in the seventh episode of the show's sixth season, "Messin' With the Kid". Potter appeared as herself on the show, performing "I Want Something That I Want" with Galeotti's character Haley James Scott. She also performed "Ah, Mary".

In 2009, Potter was featured on the track "Ordinary Man" by fellow Vermont singer-songwriter Gregory Douglass on his album Battler.

Potter contributed again to One Tree Hill in the show's eighth season. Various artists covered Gavin DeGraw's hit song "I Don't Want to Be" to be played over the show's opening credits. Potter contributed her cover for the eighth episode of the season, Mouthful of Diamonds.

Potter sang on the track "You and Tequila" on the 2010 album Hemingway's Whiskey by country music singer Kenny Chesney. Chesney joined the Nocturnals when they opened on October 30 for The Avett Brothers at the Ryman Auditorium in Nashville. Potter returned to sing backing vocals on Chesney's late-2012 single "El Cerrito Place". She also sang with Chesney again on "Wild Child".

In 2013, the group performed at the 2013 NCAA Finals Big Dance in Atlanta, GA, and in Rio de Janeiro, Brazil, at the Rock in Rio festival.

Potter is featured on Gov't Mule's 2013 album Shout! providing lead vocals for the song "Whisper In Your Soul." The song debuted on September 5, 2013, when Potter performed with Gov't Mule at the first annual Lockn' Festival in Arrington, VA.

On June 3, 2015 (in Minneapolis, MN), and June 6, 2015 (in Arlington, TX), Grace Potter opened for the Rolling Stones during the Zip Code Tour, and joined them onstage to perform "Gimme Shelter".

== Other appearances in the media ==
In 2011, the song "Paris (Ooh la la)" was featured in the Season 2 promo for the TNT television series Rizzoli & Isles.

In July 2011, Potter appeared with Chelsea Handler on her television show.

Potter provided the voice of Carol, the owner of Christmas Carol's, a bar in the Disney Christmas special Prep & Landing: Naughty vs. Nice in December 2011. In 2012, their song "Nothing but the Water" was heard during trailers for the short-lived 2012 ABC drama Last Resort.

In the spring of 2019, the song "The Lion the Beast the Beat" was featured in the season 2 episode of Cloak & Dagger entitled "Vikingtown Sound".

== Band members ==
Former members

- Grace Potter – lead vocals, keyboards, guitar, percussion (2002–2015)
- Matt Burr – drums, percussion, backing vocals (2002–2015)
- Scott Tournet – lead guitar, keyboards, lap steel, backing vocals (2002–2015)
- Bryan Dondero – bass (2002–2009)
- Catherine Popper – bass, backing vocals (2009–2011)
- Benny Yurco – rhythm guitar, backing vocals (2009–2015)
- Michael Libramento – bass, keyboards, backing vocals (2011–2015)

== Discography ==
- Nothing but the Water (2005)
- This Is Somewhere (2007)
- Grace Potter and the Nocturnals (2010)
- The Lion the Beast the Beat (2012)
