= Follow the Lights =

EP by Ryan Adams & the Cardinals
- Released: October 23, 2007
- Recorded: Village Recorder (Los Angeles, California); Sunset Sound (Hollywood, California); Glenwood Place (Burbank, California)
- Genre: Alternative country
- Length: 31:10
- Label: Lost Highway
- Producer: Jamie Candiloro

Ryan Adams chronology
Easy Tiger (2007)	Follow the Lights (2007)	Cardinology (2008)

Professional ratings
Review scores
Source	Rating
411Mania	(7/10) link
AllMusic	link
antiMusic	link
Robert Christgau	link
IGN	(9.1/10) link
The Music Box	link
Pitchfork	(6.5/10) link
PopMatters	link
Tiny Mix Tapes	link

Follow the Lights (released in the UK as Everybody Knows) is an EP by Ryan Adams & the Cardinals released on October 23, 2007. The EP contains three new songs and four live studio recordings, including a cover of the Alice in Chains' song, "Down in a Hole". It was produced by then-Cardinals member James Candiloro.

The EP includes a re-recorded version of the song "Blue Hotel", which originally appeared on Willie Nelson's Songbird album. "This Is It" was previously recorded for Rock n Roll, "If I Am a Stranger" for Cold Roses and "Dear John" – which was co-written by Ryan Adams and Norah Jones – for Jacksonville City Nights.

In its first week, Follow the Lights sold about 19,000 copies and entered the US Billboard 200 chart at number 40.

In the UK, Follow the Lights was released as Everybody Knows, with the titular "Everybody Knows" from Easy Tiger included as an extra track. In Germany, the EP is not available individually, but was added as a bonus disc to a limited edition reissue of Easy Tiger.

The album cover is a photograph taken by the guitarist Neal Casal.

== Track listing ==
All tracks are written by Ryan Adams, unless otherwise noted.

No.	Title	Writer(s)	Length
1.	"Follow the Lights"		3:03
2.	"My Love for You Is Real"		4:52
3.	"Blue Hotel"		5:11
4.	"Down in a Hole"	Jerry Cantrell	4:37
5.	"This Is It" (Cardinals version)	Ryan Adams and Johnny T	3:32
6.	"If I Am a Stranger" (New version)		4:44
7.	"Dear John" (New version)	Ryan Adams and Norah Jones	5:12

== Personnel ==
- Ryan Adams — guitars, piano, banjo, vocals
- Brad Pemberton — drums, percussion
- Chris Feinstein — bass guitar
- Jon Graboff — pedal steel, vocals
- Neal Casal — guitars, vocals, cover photograph
- James Candiloro — piano, keyboards, producer, recording ("Follow the Lights" and "My Love for You is Real"), mixing
- Jason Wormer — recording
- Clifton Aleen — recording assistant
- Brendan Dekora — mixing assistant
- Bob Ludwig — mastering
- Philip Andelman — live photograph
- Andy West — design
