= This Is It (Ryan Adams song) =

Single by Ryan Adams

from the album Rock n Roll
- Released: 2004
- Genre: Rock
- Label: Lost Highway Records
- Songwriter(s): Ryan Adams / Johnny T. Yerington
- Producer(s): James Barber

Ryan Adams singles chronology
"So Alive" (2004)	"This Is It" (2004)	"Wonderwall" (2004)

Music video
- "This Is It" on YouTube

"This Is It" is a song by singer-songwriter Ryan Adams from his 2003 album Rock n Roll. The song was co-written with Johnny T. Yerington and released as a single in 2004.

A music video for "This Is It", directed by Dominic J. DeJoseph, was produced in 2004. It features concert footage of Adams and his band performing the song.

An acoustic version of the song was released as a b-side, while a mellower, re-recorded version with The Cardinals can be found on the 2007 EP Follow The Lights.

== B-sides ==
A number of non-album tracks were released as b-sides on the various "This Is It" singles, including "Red Lights", "Closer When She Goes", "Twice As Bad As Love", "Funeral Marching", and "Liar". All of these songs are outtakes from Rock n Roll, with the exception of "Twice As Bad As Love", which comes from the sessions for Love Is Hell.

== Track listings ==
CD Single
Lost Highway Records 986214

1. "This Is It"
2. "Red Lights" (non-album track)
3. "Closer When She Goes" (non-album track)
4. "Twice As Bad As Love" (non-album track)

Limited Edition 10" Vinyl Single
Mercury Records 9862150

1. "This Is It"
2. "Funeral Marching" (non-album track)
3. "Liar" (non-album track)
4. "This Is It" (Acoustic Version) (non-album track)

Note that evidence of the existence of this 10" EP remains to be seen, as only acetates are known to exist, not stock copies.

== Personnel and production credits ==
- Ryan Adams — guitar, vocals, and almost all instruments
- Johnny T. Yerington — drums
- John Flaugher — bass guitar
- Produced by James Barber

"Red Lights" / "Closer When She Goes"

- Produced by Eli Janney

"Twice As Bad As Love"

- Produced by John Porter with the band in New Orleans
