= Ryan Adams & the Cardinals: A View of Other Windows =

Book by Neal Casal

- Author: Neal Casal
- Cover artist: Neal Casal
- Language: English
- Genre: Photo-book
- Publisher: Abrams Books
- Publication date: February 22, 2010
- Publication place: United States
- Media type: Print (hardback)
- Pages: 160
- ISBN: 978-0-8109-8266-6

A View of Other Windows is a coffee table photo-book by American musician Neal Casal documenting his time spent in the alt-country band Ryan Adams & the Cardinals from 2005 to 2009. Released on February 22, 2010 through Abrams Books, the book contains an introduction by Ryan Adams, and features written contributions from bandmates, Jon Graboff, Brad Pemberton and Chris Feinstein, throughout. Grateful Dead founding member and bass guitarist Phil Lesh wrote the book's afterword.

Upon the book's release, Casal stated: "I approached photographing [Ryan Adams] in the same way that I approached the way we played guitars together. I liken it to diving off of really high and dangerous cliffs."

The book's title is taken from the track, "Evergreen", from the band's final album, Cardinology (2008).

== Background ==
Regarding the book, Neal Casal stated, "I photographed my life with the band from our first rehearsal in New York through our last show in Atlanta on March 20, 2009, and the result is Ryan Adams & The Cardinals: A View of Other Windows. I didn’t begin this project with aspirations of making a book, but because I love documenting my life through photography, and the Cardinals were such endlessly fascinating subjects for me. Photography is a means to making life on the road and in the studio more interesting, and a way of telling stories that no one would know otherwise. The camera is the instrument I pick up when a room is too quiet for music. A perfect way to continue singing the song after a show has ended."
