= Roots and Wings =

Roots and Wings may refer to:

- Roots and Wings (James Bonamy album)
- Roots and Wings (Neal Casal album)
- Roots and Wings (Terri Clark album)
- Roots and Wings (Jill Johnson album)
- Roots and Wings (Vaya Con Dios album)
- Roots and Wings, a Sheila Chandra album
