= Sweeten the Distance =

Studio album by Neal Casal
- Released: November 14, 2011
- Recorded: The Hangar, Sacramento, California; Wacs, Los Angeles; Castaway 7 Studios, Ventura, California; Cozy Shack, Brooklyn
- Language: English
- Label: Fargo Records
- Producer: Thom Monahan

Neal Casal chronology
Roots and Wings (2009)	Sweeten the Distance (2011)

Sweeten the Distance is the tenth studio album by American singer-songwriter Neal Casal, released on November 14, 2011, on Fargo Records. Produced by Thom Monahan, the album is Casal's first since the break-up of The Cardinals in 2009, and features contributions from former bandmate Jon Graboff throughout.

== Background and recording ==
Sweeten the Distance was recorded over six months at The Hangar, Sacramento with producer Thom Monahan. Regarding the sessions, Casal stated, "It could have gone faster, but Thom and I wanted to take our time and really get everything right. I'm not into making records quickly anymore, I like to work slowly and make sure they're fully realized."

== Writing and composition ==
The track, "White Fence Round House", was written following a near-death experience while surfing. Casal noted, "I think that [song] is one of the strongest I've ever written. I wrote it after nearly drowning during a surf session with my friend DJ in San Diego County. It really shook me up and humbled me. I'd been going through some personal turbulence at the time and when I got home, I picked up a guitar and the song poured out of me in ten minutes. It's like I wasn't even writing the song, it just came streaming through. The power of being held in the ocean grabbed my unconscious and rattled that song out of me, it was something of a heavy experience."

== Track listing ==
All songs written by Neal Casal.

1. "Sweeten the Distance"
2. "Bird with No Name"
3. "Need Shelter"
4. "Let it All Begin"
5. "White Fence Round House"
6. "So Many Enemies"
7. "Feathers for Bakersfield"
8. "Time and Trouble"
9. "How Quiet it Got"
10. "The Gyrls of Wynter"
11. "Angel and You're Mine"

== Personnel ==
=== Musicians ===
- Neal Casal - vocals, electric and acoustic guitars, piano, wurlitzer, organ, percussion
- Jon Graboff - electric guitar, pedal steel guitar
- Dan Fadel - drums
- Jeff Hill - bass, harmony vocals
- John Ginty - hammond organ
- Rick Menck - percussion
- Thom Monahan - percussion, harmonies (9)
- Amanda Shires - harmonies (7 & 11), strings (7)
- Trevor Beld - harmonies (2, 5 & 8)
- Seth Petterson - harmonies (2, 5 & 8)
- Hannah Cohen - harmonies (1 & 5)
- Andy Cabic - harmonies (5)

=== Recording personnel ===
- Thom Monahan - producer, engineer, mixing
- JP Hesser - additional recording
- Jeff Hill - additional recording
- JJ Golden - mastering

=== Artwork ===
- Michael Sportes - artwork
- Andy West - design
- Piper Ferguson - photograph
