= No Fools, No Fun =

Studio album by Puss n Boots
- Released: July 15, 2014
- Recorded: Studio G, Brooklyn, New York; The Bell House, Brooklyn, New York
- Genres: Country, rockabilly, jazz, blues, folk
- Length: 42:18
- Label: Blue Note

Singles from No Fools, No Fun
- 1. "Down by the River (Live from The Bell House, Brooklyn, NY / 2013)" Released: June 3, 2014

No Fools, No Fun is the debut full-length album by Brooklyn-based alt-country trio Puss n Boots, released on July 15, 2014, through Blue Note Records. It is a collection of five original and seven cover songs originally performed by artists including Johnny Cash, Wilco and Neil Young. The album, which contains both studio and live recordings, is available on CD, vinyl and as a digital download. The album's title comes from lyrics in the Johnny Cash song, "Bull Rider", which is covered by the band on the album.

== Background and recording ==
About six months prior to the album's release the band decided to make a full-length album. The standard-edition release contains three live recordings, while a fourth is included as one of two bonus tracks on the Amazon deluxe edition. The live tracks were recorded live at The Bell House in Brooklyn, NY on June 27, 2013. The studio tracks on the album were recorded in just three days at Studio G in Brooklyn.

== Release ==
=== Singles ===
The lead single from No Fools, No Fun, titled "Down By The River (Live From The Bell House, Brooklyn, NY / 2013)", was released on June 3, 2014. The song is a cover written and originally performed by Neil Young.

=== Album ===
No Fools, No Fun was released on July 15, 2014, through Blue Note Records. Amazon released an exclusive edition on CD and digital download that contains two bonus tracks.

== Promotion ==
In support of the album, Puss n Boots toured during the summer and fall of 2014. Along with clubs, the band performed at numerous festivals including the Clearwater Festival, Green River Festival and the Newport Folk Festival.

On July 12, 2014, Puss n Boots was featured on SiriusXM's Outlaw Country channel, promoting the album and playing songs from it over an hour-long program.

Prior to the album's release the band performed at The Wall Street Journal cafe and inside the "Soundcheck studio" at WNYC.

On July 16, 2014, Puss n Boots performed "Don't Know What It Means" on The Tonight Show.

On August 16, 2014, Puss n Boots appeared on the Saturday edition of the television show CBS This Morning.

On October 2, 2014 Puss n Boots appeared inside the performance studio at a Live Lunch presentation from WTMD 89.7 in Towson/Baltimore MD.

== Critical reception ==
Professional ratings
Aggregate scores
Source	Rating
Metacritic	66/100
Review scores
Source	Rating
AllMusic	3.5/5 stars
American Songwriter	3/5 stars
Rolling Stone	3/5 stars
Paste	6/10
34th Street Magazine	B
TODAY	4/5 stars

No Fools, No Fun received mostly positive reviews from music critics upon its release. At Metacritic, they assign a "weighted average" rating out of 100 to selected independent ratings and reviews from mainstream critics, and the album has received an Metascore of a 66, based on 4 reviews, indicating "generally favorable" reviews.

Stephen Thomas Erlewine of AllMusic rated the album three and a half stars out of five, calling it "an appealing listen," and that it is "never rowdy -- the closest it comes is the train-track beat of Jones' original "Don't Know What It Means"—but there's an earthiness to the trio's chemistry that signals how deeply the group knows each other's strengths and weaknesses."

Rating the album three stars out of five, Hal Horowitz of American Songwriter states that its "difficult to dislike something that feels as genuine and unaffected as these dozen tracks played by talented friends clearly relishing each other’s company."

Writing for Rolling Stone and rating the album three stars out of five, Will Hermes expressed, "Most bar bands don't manage trio harmonies near this gorgeous, but the song selection is uneven."

Frederick Marfil of M Magazine called No Fools, No Fun "This summer’s all-purpose soundtrack ... (it) sounds as good at parties as it does in your headphones."

== Chart performance ==
No Fools, No Fun debuted at No. 83 on the Billboard 200 chart. It also debuted at No. 7 on the Folk Albums chart and No. 28 on the Top Rock Albums chart.

Chart (2014)	Peak position
Belgian Albums (Ultratop Flanders)	102
Belgian Albums (Ultratop Wallonia)	51
Swiss Albums (Schweizer Hitparade)	68
US Billboard 200	83
US Americana/Folk Albums (Billboard)	7
US Top Rock Albums (Billboard)	28

== Track listing ==
Standard edition
No.	Title	Writer(s)	Original artist	Length
1.	"Leaving London"	Tom Paxton	Tom Paxton	3:10
2.	"Bull Rider" (Live from the Bell House, Brooklyn, NY / 2013-06-27)	Rodney Crowell	Johnny Cash	3:39
3.	"Twilight"	Robbie Robertson	The Band	3:08
4.	"Sex Degrees of Separation"	Sasha Dobson		3:17
5.	"Don't Know What It Means"	Norah Jones		2:26
6.	"Down by the River" (Live from the Bell House, Brooklyn, NY / 2013-06-27)	Neil Young	Neil Young with Crazy Horse	5:29
7.	"Tarnished Angel" (Live from the Bell House, Brooklyn, NY / 2013-06-27)	Roger Miller	George Jones	3:45
8.	"Jesus, Etc."	Jeff Tweedy	Wilco	4:11
9.	"Always"	Catherine Popper		3:18
10.	"GTO"	Jeb Loy Nichols	Jeb Loy Nichols	4:10
11.	"Pines"	Popper		2:38
12.	"You'll Forget Me"	Dobson		3:03
Total length:				42:18

Amazon.com bonus tracks
No.	Title	Writer(s)	Original artist	Length
13.	"Cry, Cry, Cry"	Johnny Cash	Johnny Cash	3:11
14.	"In a Shanty in Old Shanty Town" (Live from the Bell House, Brooklyn, NY / 2013)	Ira Schuster, Jack Little, Joe Young	Ted Lewis and His Band	4:41
Total length:				50:10

== Personnel ==
Puss n Boots

- Norah Jones – vocals, electric guitar, fiddle
- Sasha Dobson – vocals, acoustic guitar, bass, drums
- Catherine Popper – vocals, bass, acoustic guitar

Technical personnel

- Joel Hamilton – engineering, mixing (at Studio G in Brooklyn, NY)
- Greg Calbi – mastering (at Sterling Sound in New York City)
- Matt Labozza – assistant engineering
- Mike Jinno – assistant engineering
- Francisco Botero – assistant engineering
- Nicole Frantz – creative direction
- Frank Harkins – art direction, design
- Richard Ballard – photography

== Release history ==
Region	Date	Format(s)	Label
United States	July 15, 2014	CD; Digital download; Vinyl	Blue Note
