= Easy Tiger =

Studio album by Ryan Adams
- Released: June 26, 2007
- Recorded: Electric Lady (New York City)
- Genres: Alternative country, rock
- Length: 42:33
- Label: Lost Highway Records
- Producer: Jamie Candiloro

Ryan Adams chronology
29 (2005)	Easy Tiger (2007)	Follow the Lights (2007)

Singles from Easy Tiger
- 1. "Two" Released: 2007; 2. "Halloweenhead" Released: 2007; 3. "Everybody Knows" Released: 2007

Easy Tiger is the ninth studio album by Ryan Adams, released on June 26, 2007, on the Lost Highway label. Although the album is attributed solely to Adams, Easy Tiger features The Cardinals as his backing band, with Adams stating: "The only real concept of this record was complete and utter collaboration." In an interview, Adams states that the album contains "very, very simple, very easy songs that, in my opinion, were written on the periphery of some more complex work." Easy Tiger marks the first appearance of both guitarist Neal Casal and bassist Chris Feinstein, following the departures of J.P. Bowersock and Catherine Popper, respectively. Following the album's release, producer James Candiloro would go on to join The Cardinals as the band's pianist and keyboard player.

The album debuted at #7 on the Billboard 200 with Adams highest first-week sales (61,000) and has sold 217,000 copies in the U.S. as of September 2008 and 500,000 worldwide. Furthermore, the album debuted in Canada, Estonia and Switzerland where Ryan Adams has never had an album chart before. "Halloweenhead" was #45 in Rolling Stone's list of the 100 Best Songs of 2007.

In 2010, Adams would go on to release two further studio albums that stemmed from Easy Tiger's recording sessions: III/IV, a double album recorded prior to Catherine Popper's departure, and Orion, a heavy metal collaboration between Adams and producer Jamie Candiloro.

== Production and release ==
The vinyl release of Easy Tiger is credited to "Ryan Adams & The Cardinals".

"Off Broadway" first appeared on the bootleg The Suicide Handbook, a compilation of unreleased demo recordings, and was performed as early as 2001. "These Girls" previously appeared as "Hey There, Mrs. Lovely" on Adams' unreleased 2000 album Destroyer.

Sheryl Crow provides backing vocals on the track "Two", which was featured in the film Hancock.

== Reception ==
Professional ratings
Aggregate scores
Source	Rating
Metacritic	(76/100)
Review scores
Source	Rating
AllMusic	3.5/5 stars
Drowned in Sound	(7/10)
Entertainment Weekly	A−
The Guardian	3/5 stars
NME	(6/10)
Pitchfork	(6.2/10)
PopMatters	7/10 stars
Rolling Stone	3.5/5 stars
Spin	(8/10)
Yahoo! Music UK	8/10 stars

The album has a score of 76 out of 100 based on 29 "generally favorable reviews". Real Detroit Weekly gave it a favorable review and called it "a mosaic masterpiece of [Adams'] past works." The A.V. Club gave it a B+ and said, " On the whole, Easy Tiger isn't quite as strong as 2005's Cold Roses—and even that release was naggingly inconsistent. But Adams has a history of making scattershot records: 50 percent brilliant, 25 percent okay, and 25 percent hackery. By the standards he's set for himself, Easy Tiger is one of his best, if only because it beats the percentages." The New York Times gave it a favorable review and said, "It is focused—read: not insanely self-indulgent—in a way that recalls albums of his like Heartbreaker and Gold." The Observer gave it a score of four stars out of five and called it Adams' "most rounded creation". Uncut gave it a score of four stars out of five and said, "The real triumph of Easy Tiger is less rooted in the sound, more in the attitude." Slant Magazine also gave it four stars out of five and said that what the album "lacks in craft or measure, it makes up for in raw inspiration, which makes it all the more addictive." Now also gave it four stars out of five and said of Adams and his songs: "The Sheryl Crow duet works where his Norah Jones collabo didn't; "I Taught Myself How To Grow Old" is classic tortured Adams, and "Pearls On A String" is a rewarding reflection of the time he spent hanging out with Willie Nelson." Sputnikmusic also gave it a score of four out of five and said it was "at least Adams' best release since Love is Hell and it may even be the long awaited successor to Heartbreaker." The Village Voice also gave it a favorable review and said, "The lived-in songs and careful presentation of Easy Tiger make for one of the strongest records of his second career as a solo artist."

Alternative Press gave it three-and-a-half stars out of five and said that "Adams often finds himself reliving his past glories." Tiny Mix Tapes also gave it three-and-a-half stars out of five and said that the album was not Adams' best, "but it's got focus and a lot of heart." Billboard gave it a positive review and said, "This 'Tiger' is fairly tame, but that's OK." The Boston Globe also gave it a positive review and said, "Gone is the petulant enfant terrible, and with it a certain sparkle and swagger that made a record like Gold careen from the speakers." Stylus Magazine gave it a B− and said it "sounds like the kind of album Adams could churn out every 18 months for the rest of his life." Other reviews are very mixed: an example of this is Prefix Magazine, which gave the album an average review and called it "a tightrope walker, constantly straddling the line between sincerity and unapologetic rocking."

== Track listing ==
All tracks are written by Ryan Adams, Brad Pemberton, Neal Casal and Jon Graboff, unless otherwise stated.

No.	Title	Writer(s)	Length
1.	"Goodnight Rose"		3:20
2.	"Two"	Adams, Pemberton	2:39
3.	"Everybody Knows"		2:26
4.	"Halloweenhead"	Adams	3:23
5.	"Oh My God, Whatever, Etc."	Adams, Pemberton	2:33
6.	"Tears of Gold"		2:55
7.	"The Sun Also Sets"	Adams, Pemberton	4:11
8.	"Off Broadway"	Adams, Pemberton	2:32
9.	"Pearls on a String"		2:25
10.	"Rip Off"	Adams, Pemberton	3:12
11.	"Two Hearts"		3:03
12.	"These Girls"	Adams, Pemberton	2:52
13.	"I Taught Myself How to Grow Old"	Adams	3:21
14.	"Nobody Listens to Silence" (UK/Japan bonus track)	Adams	3:41
15.	"Alice" (Japan only bonus track)	Adams	2:16

== Charts ==
=== Album ===
Country	Peak position
US	7
Australia	32
Belgium	45
Canada	22
Denmark	35
Estonia	15
Italy	82
Ireland	14
Holland	37
New Zealand	20
Norway	5
Sweden	10
Switzerland	60
UK	18

=== Singles ===
Year	Single	Chart	Peak position
2007	"Two/Halloweenhead"	UK Singles Chart	192

== Personnel ==
=== The Cardinals ===
- Ryan Adams – vocals, guitar, piano, banjo, harmonica
- Brad Pemberton – drums, percussion, vocals
- Jon Graboff – pedal steel, vocals, guitar, mandolin
- Neal Casal – guitar, vocals, keyboards
- Chris Feinstein – bass, vocals

=== Other musicians ===
- Jamie Candiloro – piano, keyboards, synths, bass, percussion
- Eric Gorfain – violin
- Daphne Chen – violin
- Leah Katz – viola
- Richard Dodd – cello
- Richard Worn – vocals
- Sheryl Crow – vocals
- Catherine Popper – bass, vocals
- Cindy Cashdollar – pedal steel, lap steel, dobro
