= Jesus, Etc. =

Song by Wilco

from the album Yankee Hotel Foxtrot
- Released: April 23, 2002
- Recorded: 2002
- Studio: The Loft, Chicago
- Genre: Indie rock
- Length: 3:50
- Label: Nonesuch
- Songwriters: Jeff Tweedy; Jay Bennett
- Lyricist: Jeff Tweedy
- Producer: Wilco

"Jesus, Etc." is a song by American indie rock band Wilco. The song is the fifth track from their 2002 album, Yankee Hotel Foxtrot. The song was written by frontman Jeff Tweedy, and Jay Bennett, with the lyrics being written by Tweedy alone. The song is often hailed as one of the best off of the album, and from the band's entire discography.

== Composition and recording ==
Jay Bennett says that the original title for the song was "Jesus Don't Cry", but that when making the CD for the song, he "got lazy", and wrote simply "Jesus, Etc.", and the name stuck.

The album, and likewise the song, were initially supposed to be released on September 11, 2001, the day of the 9/11 terrorist attacks, but it was delayed when they were cut loose by their record company. Tweedy told Rolling Stone, "There were a lot of eerie echoes of 9/11 that I heard on Yankee Hotel Foxtrot, maybe because some of the focus on that record was being introspective about America. I understood how people could hear that in it. I'm obviously very, very honored if anybody found any kind of consolation in that record, at that time or now."

== Critical reception ==
Jesus, Etc. was released on Yankee Hotel Foxtrot on April 23, 2002, to widespread critical acclaim. Many of these critics cited "Jesus, Etc." as one of the best songs on the album. The alternative music website Pitchfork named the song as the 61st best song of the decade, also naming "Poor Places" from the album as the 147th best song of the decade.

Chris Deville of Stereogum stated of the song "near the center of the tracklist lies 'Jesus, etc.,' a tender midtempo glide that strikes some impossible balance between the Eagles and Steve Reich. It may be the finest song of Tweedy’s lifetime, and it continues to turn my orbit around to this day."

== Puss n Boots cover ==
"Jesus, Etc." was covered by alt-country trio Puss n Boots, for their 2014 album No Fools, No Fun. Norah Jones of Puss n Boots stated, "We were hanging out afterwards with Wilco, and Jeff Tweedy comes up and he's like, 'Man, that was cool. You changed the lyrics, it was cool,'" Jones added, "I was mortified because I know that song so well and I didn't even Google the lyrics. I like had it memorized from just listening to it, and I guess I heard it wrong."

== Personnel ==
- Jeff Tweedy
- John Stirratt
- Leroy Bach
- Glenn Kotche
- Jay Bennett
