= Hard Working Americans (album) =

Album by Hard Working Americans

Studio album by Hard Working Americans
- Released: January 21, 2014
- Recorded: TRI Studios, San Rafael, CA
- Genre: Rock, southern rock, jam
- Length: 45:10
- Label: Thirty Tigers/Melvin Records
- Producer: Todd Snider, Dave Schools

Hard Working Americans is the debut album from supergroup Hard Working Americans. The band consists of singer Todd Snider, bassist Dave Schools from Widespread Panic, Neal Casal of Chris Robinson Brotherhood on guitar and vocals, Chad Staehly of Great American Taxi on keyboards and Duane Trucks (Derek's younger brother) on drums.

The album is made up entirely of cover songs. The project was the brainchild of Snider, who "wanted to take his songwriting sensibility, material by people he thinks have written what he calls “perfect songs,” and sort of collide them into the jamband sensibility."

The album was recorded at Bob Weir's TRI Studios in San Rafael, CA in 2013. Schools and Snider split the production duties, while John Keane handled the mixing. Hard Working Americans was initially released on January 21, 2014 on Thirty Tigers/Melvin Records.

== Critical reception ==
Hard Working Americans received generally favorable reviews from critics.

Professional ratings
Aggregate scores
| Source | Rating |
|---|---|
| Metacritic | 72% |
Review scores
| Source | Rating |

== Track listing ==
| No. | Title | Length |
|---|---|---|
| 1. | "Blackland Farmer" (Frankie Miller) | 4:22 |
| 2. | "Another Train" (Will Kimbrough / Gwil Owen) | 2:55 |
| 3. | "Down to the Well" (Kevin Gordon / Colin Linden) | 4:16 |
| 4. | "The Mountain Song" (Chad Jeffers / Kieran Kane / Sean Locke) | 3:20 |
| 5. | "Stomp and Holler" (Hayes Carll) | 4:48 |
| 6. | "Straight to Hell" (Kevn Kinney) | 5:51 |
| 7. | "Welfare Music" (Brian Henneman / S. Taylor) | 3:32 |
| 8. | "Mr. President Have Pity on the Working Man" (Randy Newman) | 3:18 |
| 9. | "Run a Mile" (Don Herron / Chuck Mead) | 3:50 |
| 10. | "I Don't Have a Gun" (Will Kimbrough / Tommy Womack) | 4:11 |
| 11. | "Wrecking Ball" (David Rawlings / Gillian Welch) | 4:47 |

== Personnel ==
Todd Snider - Vocals
Dave Schools - Bass
Neal Casal - Guitar, Vocals
Chad Staehly - Keyboards
Duane Trucks - Drums

Additional Musicians

John Popper - Harmonica
Jason Crosby - Fiddle, Piano
John Keane - Banjo, Guitar, Vocals
