= 29 (album) =

Studio album by Ryan Adams
- Released: December 19, 2005
- Recorded: August 2004
- Studios: Three Crow (Los Angeles, California)
- Genres: Alternative country; folk rock
- Length: 48:54
- Label: Lost Highway
- Producer: Ethan Johns

Ryan Adams chronology
Jacksonville City Nights (2005)	29 (2005)	Easy Tiger (2007)

Professional ratings
Aggregate scores
Source	Rating
Metacritic	(69/100)
Review scores
Source	Rating
Allmusic	2/5 stars
Entertainment.ie	4/5 stars
Entertainment Weekly	B−
Los Angeles Times	3/4 stars
NME	(8/10)
Pitchfork Media	(6.8/10)
PopMatters	5/10 stars
Robert Christgau	C
Rolling Stone	2.5/5 stars
Stylus Magazine	B−

29 is the eighth studio album by American singer-songwriter Ryan Adams, released on December 19, 2005, by Lost Highway Records. Produced by Ethan Johns, and recorded prior to the formation of backing band The Cardinals, the album was the last of three released in 2005. Session guitarist JP Bowersock would later go on to join the Cardinals, subsequently recording Cold Roses and Jacksonville City Nights alongside Adams. The album's cover art was drawn by Adams.

The album has sold 81,000 copies in the United States and 153,000 worldwide. In November 2009, the album was number 54 on a list of "The 100 best pop albums of the Noughties" by The Times music critics.

== Recording notes ==
29 was recorded over two weeks during the first half of August 2004 at producer Ethan Johns' North Hollywood studio, Three Crows. According to Johns, only two songs were completely written before the sessions began, "Night Birds" and "Elizabeth, You Were Born To Play That Part". The remaining tracks were written in the studio. To give the music a sense of spontaneity and immediacy, several of the songs on the album were first takes.

The album is a loose concept album, with each song representing a single year in Adams' twenties.

== Reception ==
The album received a score of 69 out of 100 on Metacritic based on "generally favorable reviews". Uncut gave it all five stars and said it was "not easy listening, yet [Adams has] never made a more beautiful album." Yahoo! Music UK gave it nine stars out of ten and said, "At last Ryan Adams has made a record every bit as good as his heroes." The A.V. Club gave it a B and said that Adams' music "takes some sifting, but the gold always glitters." The New York Times gave it a favorable review and called it "Cohesive in its fragility." E! Online gave it a B− and said that Adams "fails to come up with an album that keeps up the standard set here by a couple of standout tracks such as 'Strawberry Wine' and 'Nightbirds'."

Other reviews are average or mixed: The Guardian gave it a score of three stars out of five and said, "Committed Adams-heads will love it; others will wonder why he commands such loyalty." The Village Voice gave it an average review and said, "Adams mines American Beauty and Workingman's Dead respectably, but his attempts at early-'70s Neil Young piano ballads come off as tear-stained love letters to himself, and hardly distinguish him as the guy who dropped out of high school to become Paul Westerberg." Prefix Magazine gave it a mixed review and said that "Despite the three or four keepers, 29 suggests that Adams is still struggling to nail down his musical identity."

== Track listing ==
All tracks are written by Ryan Adams.

No.	Title	Length
1.	"29"	5:48
2.	"Strawberry Wine"	7:58
3.	"Nightbirds"	3:51
4.	"Blue Sky Blues"	5:18
5.	"Carolina Rain"	5:25
6.	"Starlite Diner"	3:51
7.	"The Sadness"	6:43
8.	"Elizabeth, You Were Born to Play That Part"	5:07
9.	"Voices"	4:53

== Charts ==
Chart (2005)	Peak position
Austrian Albums Chart	73
Dutch Albums (Megacharts)	73
German Albums (Media Control Charts)	57
UK Albums (OCC)	91
US Billboard 200	144

== Personnel ==
- Ryan Adams – vocals, acoustic guitar, piano, electric guitar
- Wayne Bergeron – trumpet
- JP Bowersock – electric guitar, mandolin, acoustic 12-string guitar, guitarone
- Jennifer Condos – bass
- Bruce Dukov – violin
- Endre Granat – violin
- Ethan Johns – drums, bass, pedal steel guitar, chamberlin, synthesizer, acoustic guitar, ukulele, harpsichord, string arrangement, brass arrangement, conducting
- Alan Kaplan – trombone
- Dennis Karmayzn – cello
- Phil Levy – violin
- David Low – cello
- Rafael Rishik – violin
- Anatoly Rosinsky – violin
- Lisa Sutton – violin
