= Cindy Cashdollar =

American musician (born 1956)

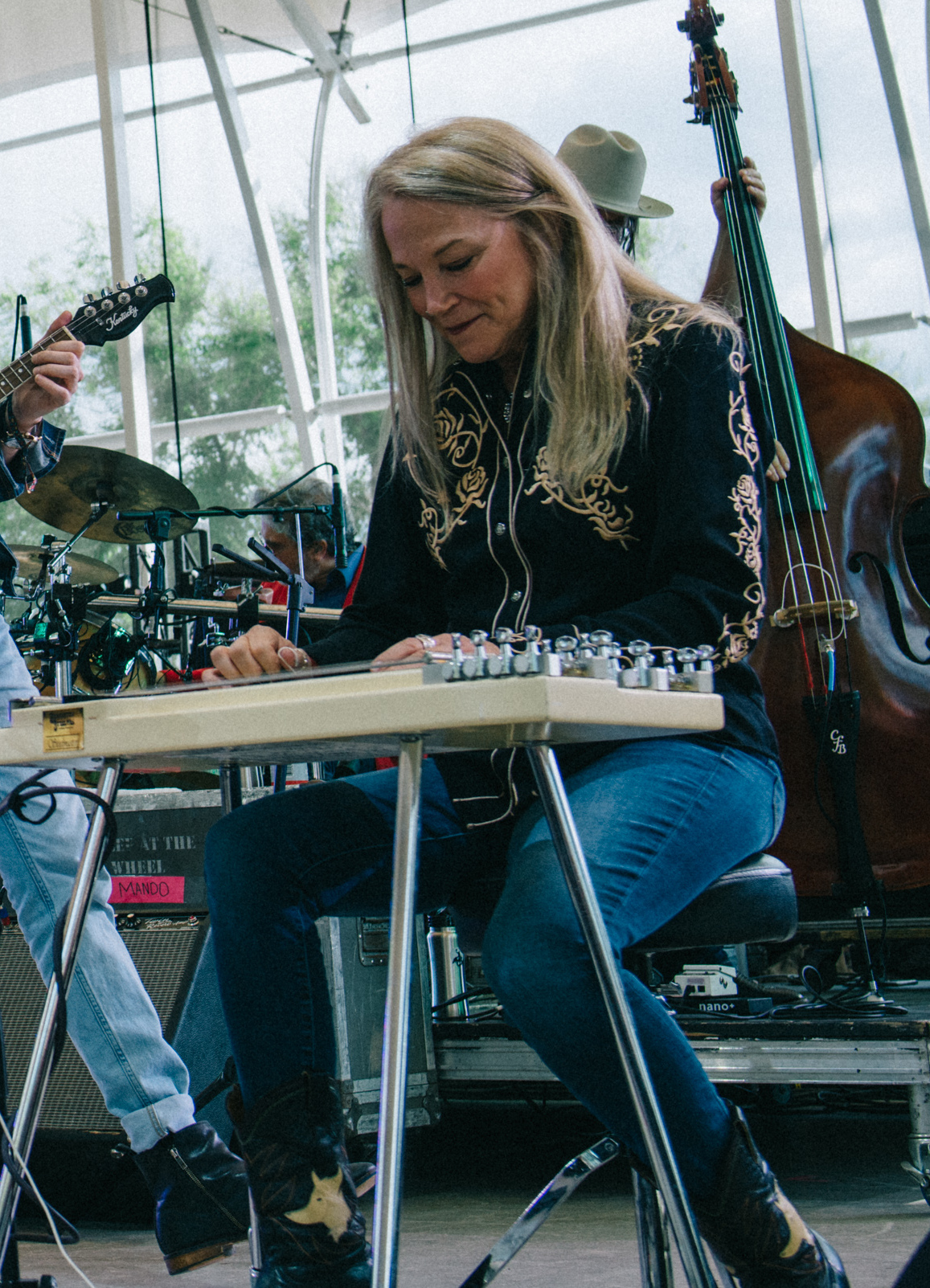
- Cashdollar performing as part of the band Asleep at the Wheel in 2019

Background information
- Born: May 25, 1956 (age 70)
- Origin: Woodstock, New York, U.S.
- Genres: Ameripolitan, bluegrass, western swing
- Occupations: Musician, guitarist
- Instruments: Steel guitar, dobro
- Website: www.cindycashdollar.com

Cindy Cashdollar (born May 25, 1956) is an American musician specializing in steel guitar and dobro. She grew up in Woodstock, New York, where she perfected her skills by playing with bluegrass musician John Herald, blues musician Paul Butterfield, and Levon Helm and Rick Danko of The Band. After residing in Austin, Texas, for 23 years, she has now returned to her native Woodstock, New York.

Cashdollar received five Grammy Awards while playing for eight years with Asleep at the Wheel, and has also backed performers such as Bob Dylan, Leon Redbone, Redd Volkaert, Carla Olson and Ryan Adams as a member of his band The Cardinals. In August 2019, Cashdollar recorded dobro and lap steel on "Save Your Love For Me" the new Grayson Hugh record (River Soul Records 2025). In 2003, the Academy of Western Artists recognized Cashdollar as Instrumentalist of the Year Award in the Western Swing Music genre. She was inducted into The Austin Chronicle Hall of Fame in 2011–12.

She authored a series of instructional videos on her instruments and released her first solo album, Slide Show, in 2004.

During the fall of 2004 she was a member of Ryan Adams's band The Cardinals, playing the steel guitar live on stage. She also went into the studio with this band and played on the album Cold Roses, although she did not tour the album with Adams & The Cardinals, and was replaced in 2005 by Jon Graboff.

From 2005 to 2008, Cashdollar played with Elana James, Redd Volkaert (and, sometimes, Nate Rowe), as The High Flyers, appearing on A Prairie Home Companion twice, as well as playing Austin area venues.

In 2006, she toured with Van Morrison promoting his country and western album, Pay the Devil. She appeared with him at the Austin City Limits Music Festival, on September 15, 2006 (subsequently released on Van Morrison's Live at Austin City Limits Festival limited edition recording), and on the television show Austin City Limits featuring Van Morrison, broadcast in November 2006. Cashdollar plays steel guitar on two of the tracks on Morrison's March 2008 studio album, Keep It Simple. She is a member of Dave Alvin's 2009 project, Dave Alvin and the Guilty Women.

== Discography ==
Date	Title	Artist	Label
2020	Waltz For Abilene	Cindy Cashdollar	Silver Shot Records
2003	Slide Show	Cindy Cashdollar	Silver Shot Records
2009	Bootleg Series 8	Bob Dylan	Sony BMG
1997	Time Out of Mind	Bob Dylan	Columbia
2008	Miss Understood	Carolyn Wonderland	Bismeaux Productions
2009	Dave Alvin and the Guilty Women	Dave Alvin and the Guilty Women	Yep Roc Records
2008	Peace, Love & BBQ	Marcia Ball	Alligator Records
2008	Loaded	The Waybacks	Compass Records
2008	Keep It Simple	Van Morrisson	Lost Highway
2008	Dulcinea	Tremoloco	Casa Julia Records
2009	That Old Mercer Magic	JaLaLa	Dare Records
2005	Cold Roses	Ryan Adams and The Cardinals	Lost Highway
2001	The Very Best of Asleep at the Wheel	Asleep at the Wheel	Relentless / Nashville
1999	Ride with Bob	Asleep at the Wheel	DreamWorks
1997	Back to the Future Now (Live)	Asleep at the Wheel	Lucky Dog
1997	Merry Texas Christmas Y'all	Asleep at the Wheel	High Street Records
1995	The Wheel Keeps on Rollin'	Asleep at the Wheel	Capitol
1994	Still Swingin'	Asleep at the Wheel	Liberty
1993	Tribute to the Music of Bob Wills and the Texas Playboys	Asleep at the Wheel	Liberty
2009	Shadow on the Ground	James Hand	Rounder Records
2009	Texas Sheiks	Geoff Muldaur and the Texas Sheiks	Tradition & Moderne
2004	Gitane Cajun	BeauSoleil	Vanguard
2006	Hammer of the Honky-Tonk Gods	Bill Kirchen	Proper
2006	Disciples of the Truth	Burrito Deluxe	Luna Chica Records
1998	Down at the Sky-Vue Drive In	Don Walser	Watermelon Records
1996	Texas Tophand	Don Walser	Watermelon Records
1994	Rolling Stone from Texas	Don Walser	Watermelon Records
2000	Fast Texas	Steve James	Burnside
2000	Boom Chang	Steve James	Burnside
1996	Art and Grit	Steve James	Burnside
2011	Future Blues	Johnny Nicholas	Bona Dea Music / The People's Label
2005	Livin' With the Blues	Johnny Nicholas	Topcat Records
2009	Western Bling	Stephanie Davis	Recluse Records
1998	Pearls in the Snow: A Tribute to the Songs of Kinky Friedman	Kinky Friedman Tribute Artists	Kinkajou
1999	Swingland	Omar & the Howlers	Black Top Records
1999	Dance Hall Dreams	Rosie Flores	Rounder Records
2011	The Bordertown Bootleggers	The Bordertown Bootleggers	Tonepoet
2002	South of Lafayette	Artie Traum	Roaring Stream Records
1993	Letters from Joubee	Artie Traum	Narada
1986	Cayenne	Artie Traum	Rounder Records
1999	The Cajun Allstars	Chez Les Cajuns	Narada
2008	Beautiful World	Eliza Gilkyson	Red House
1991	Struck by Lightning	Graham Parker	RCA Records
1997	Crazy Moon	Hans Theessink	Blue Groove
1994	Whistling in the Wind	Leon Redbone	Private Music
1992	Up a Lazy River	Leon Redbone	Private Music
1991	Sugar	Leon Redbone	Private Music
1988	No Regrets	Leon Redbone	Private Music
1987	Christmas Island	Leon Redbone	Private Music
1996	Bicycle	Livingston Taylor	Pony Canyon
1991	Our Turn to Dance	Livingston Taylor	Pony Canyon
1997	Swing	The Manhattan Transfer	Atlantic Records
2012	Oliver Rajamani	Oliver Rajamani	Rajamani Productions
1994	Tree on a Hill	Peter Rowan and the Rowan Brothers	Sugar Hill
1996	Buffalo Zen	Rex Foster	Agarita
2013	Old-Fashioned Gal	The Carper Family	Trade Root Music
2005	A Heart Wide Open	Tish Hinojosa	Valley Entertainment
2010	Southern Filibuster: A Tribute to Tut Taylor	Various dobro players	E1 Entertainment
2003	Elf Original Soundtrack		New Line Records
1998	The Horse Whisperer Original Soundtrack		MCA
2012	This is 40 Original Soundtrack		Capitol

== Awards and nominations ==
Year	Association	Category	Nominated work	Result
2014	Ameripolitan Music Awards	The Mooney Award	Cindy Cashdollar	Won
2016	Americana Music Honors & Awards	Instrumentalist of the Year	Cindy Cashdollar	Nominated
