= Songbird (Willie Nelson album) =

Studio album by Willie Nelson
- Released: October 31, 2006
- Genre: Alternative country
- Length: 44:39
- Label: Lost Highway
- Producer: Ryan Adams

Willie Nelson chronology
You Don't Know Me: The Songs of Cindy Walker (2006)	Songbird (2006)	Last of the Breed (2007)

Professional ratings
Aggregate scores
Source	Rating
Metacritic	67/100
Review scores
Source	Rating
AllMusic	4/5 stars
The A.V. Club	A−
The Boston Phoenix	3/4 stars
Entertainment Weekly	A−
Now	3/5 stars
Pitchfork	7.4/10
PopMatters	7/10
Q	4/5 stars
Rolling Stone	3/5 stars
Uncut	8/10

Songbird is the 55th studio album by Willie Nelson released by Lost Highway Records on October 31, 2006. It was produced by contemporary country rock musician Ryan Adams. Adams, along with his band The Cardinals, performed on the album's eleven tracks. It peaked at #87 on the Billboard 200 on November 18, 2006

== Music ==
Only two brand new compositions, Nelson's "Back to Earth" and Adams' "Blue Hotel", appear on Songbird. "Rainy Day Blues", "We Don't Run", and "Sad Songs and Waltzes" are newly recorded original Nelson tunes, but had been previously recorded and released on earlier records.

Most of the songs from the album are cover tunes with new interpretations. The credit for covering these songs goes to Adams, who "...felt confident with all the selections." In the same interview, Nelson points out that he was tentative about recording songs that had already been recorded as good as these were. He summed up the album by stating, 'It'll always be the Ryan Adams project, as far as I'm concerned.'

== Adams' thoughts ==
Regarding his role of producer for the album, Ryan Adams states that he:

learned a lot of life lessons mostly. I mean, [Willie Nelson] works very quickly and it was very spare. We didn’t see him a lot, because the sessions were over a couple of different months. And also when it came up that it was something we were going to do, I was adamant that if The Cardinals were going to back him up, I would have to produce so we wouldn't have to worry about someone interfering with our sound. So they agreed to let it go down the way it went down in the studio, and I put some limits on what was going to happen in order to keep the integrity of the recording. It reminded me kind of how Jack and Meg White work, the way that their limits make them seem stronger and more able to be resourceful and economical. In thinking about that, I wanted everyone to set up in the room around Willie, with only [drummer] Brad [Pemberton] wearing headphones, and everyone using ratty old amps so that the main thing everyone heard was Willie’s voice and guitar. It was cool because it made everyone listen really hard, and I think it enabled Willie to throw the band a little more, and suck them in. It turned into a real healthy struggle. But other than that we didn’t see a lot of him because I think he was pressed for time, and maybe recording in New York was a little overwhelming for him. It was just a different process. I think he's used to coming in with the track already done and just singing over it."

== Track listing ==
1. "Rainy Day Blues" (Willie Nelson) – 5:32
2. "Songbird" (Christine McVie) – 2:40
3. "Blue Hotel" (Ryan Adams) – 3:30
4. "Back to Earth" (Willie Nelson) – 2:59
5. "Stella Blue" (Jerry Garcia/Robert Hunter) – 6:23
6. "Hallelujah" (Leonard Cohen) – 4:53
7. "$1000 Wedding" (Gram Parsons) – 3:05
8. "We Don't Run" (Willie Nelson) – 4:19
9. "Yours Love" (Harlan Howard) – 3:03
10. "Sad Songs and Waltzes" (Willie Nelson) – 3:17
11. "Amazing Grace" (Traditional Arr. by Ryan Adams) – 4:49

== Personnel ==
All information taken from the Songbird CD release:

- Willie Nelson – acoustic guitar, vocals
- Ryan Adams – acoustic guitar, electric guitar, bass guitar
- Jon Graboff – pedal steel
- Brad Pemberton – drums
- Neal Casal – piano, guitar
- Catherine Popper – bass guitar
- Mickey Raphael – harmonica
- Glenn Patscha – Hammond B-3
- “Hallelujah” background vocal arrangements: Melonie Daniels, Darius Booker, Tiffany Palmer
- “Hallelujah,” “Blue Hotel,” “$1000 Wedding” choir: Tiffany Anderson, Karen Bernod, Darius Booker, Melonie Daniels, Felicia Graham, Tiffany Palmer, Carlos Ricketts, Horace V. Rogers
- Carlos Ricketts – choir arranger
- Produced by Ryan Adams
- Engineered by Tom Gloady, Jamie Candiloro at Loho Studios (New York, NY)
- Second Engineers – Jim Keller, Gus Oberg, Eddie Jackson, Peter Doris
- Mixed by Jamie Candiloro at Avatar Studios (New York, NY)
- Mastered by Fred Kevorkian at Kevorkian Mastering (New York, NY)
- Art Direction and Design by Craig Allen
- Photography by Danny Clinch (cover), Jon Graboff

== Chart positions ==
Chart (2006)	Peak position
US Billboard Top Country Albums	19
US Billboard 200	87
