= Tamalpais Research Institute =

Virtual music venue in San Rafael, California

Tamalpais Research Institute, also known as TRI Studios, is a virtual music venue in San Rafael, California. It is the brainchild of the late Grateful Dead guitarist Bob Weir, formerly of Dead & Company as well as Bob Weir and Wolf Bros. TRI is a state-of-the-art multimedia performance studio, designed for broadcasting live high definition (HD) video and audio streams directly over the internet.

== Furthur ==
On Tuesday, June 7, 2011, Furthur performed live at Tamalpais Research Institute. The event, billed as "Furthur Experiments at TRI", was broadcast in real time over the internet in HD video with stereo sound and was available to those who ordered the pay-per-view event for $19.95. The performance included 13 songs (counting Terrapin Suite as one song), had no break, and lasted about two-and-a-half hours, beginning 6:00PM PDT. The performance was also simulcast for free in New York's Brooklyn Bowl ("BOWLcast"). While the performance was well received by fans, several had trouble viewing the event due to technical difficulties related to server/website load balancing software (subsequently corrected). As a result, TRI Studios rebroadcast the entire concert as a continuous loop stream from June 10, 2011, at 12:00 Noon until June 12, 2011, at 6:00 PM PDT, and made it accessible to those who had originally paid for the event.

== Other bands and crew ==
Prior to the Furthur webcast, TRI Studios has been used for rehearsal sessions by Journey in February 2011, Scaring the Children (featuring Bob Weir, Rob Wasserman and Jay Lane) with Jackie Greene in April 2011, and for the First Fusion collaboration between Bob Weir and the Marin Symphony, which premiered on May 7, 2011, at the Marin Center.

The first webcast from TRI, which was free, occurred on Friday, May 13, 2011, and was appropriately dubbed "TRIday the 13th with Bob Weir and Friends", featuring Bob Weir, Jay Lane, Jeff Chimenti, Rob Wasserman, Steve Kimock, Robin Sylvester, and a four-piece horn section (Marco D'Ambrosio and Jim Radseth on trumpet, Art Austin on clarinet, and Zach Spellman on tuba).

The second pay-per-view event, which cost $10, featured Slightly Stoopid and was broadcast on September 13, 2011 (with free rebroadcast from September 17, 2011, at 6 :00 PM until September 18, 2011, at 6:00 PM PDT, as well as a full refund to those who purchased the event, to compensate for technical difficulties during the live broadcast), and featured special guests Bob Weir, Ivan Neville and Ian Neville (of Dumpstaphunk), Karl D of Karl Denson's Tiny Universe, and Don Carlos Reggae.

Following this, a free webcast was broadcast, featuring Chickenfoot, billed as "Chickenfoot Presents III", on the release date of their album, Chickenfoot III, on September 27, 2011, at 6:00 PM PDT (free rebroadcast September 28, 2011, at 12:00 PDT).

On October 18, 19 and 20, 2011, The Fall Risk rehearsed and recorded at TRI, but did not webcast, and intend to release video of the sessions.

On October 21 at 7:00 PM PDT, during their annual three-day "Communion in the Redwoods" gathering in Big Sur, CA, Communion artists Matthew and the Atlas, The David Mayfield Parade, and Lauren Shera performed a free live webcast from TRI (rebroadcast on October 22 at 12:00 PM PDT).

On November 21, 2011, at 6:30 PM PST, TRI hosted a free webcast headlining Planet of the Abts (POA), featuring drummer Matt Abts and bassist Jorgen Carlsson of Gov’t Mule, and guitarist/keyboardist/vocalist T-Bone Andersson; Las Vegas funk/rock band Moksha opened for POA.

On December 21, 2011, TRI hosted a "Psychedelic Christmas present", featuring Scaring the Children for a three-song free webcast at 6:00 PM PST and 9:00 PM PST.

On December 23, 2011, TRI rebroadcast, without charge, the June 7, 2011, Furthur event, "Furthur Experiments at TRI", rebilled as "The Night Before the Night Before Christmas", at 4:00 PM PST and 7:00 PM PST.

On December 25, 2011, TRI announced that RatDog will reunite for a free webcast on January 25, 2012, at 5:00 PM PST.

On August 9, 2012, God Street Wine performed their album $1.99 Romances in its entirety in a live webcast from TRI Studios. After a brief set break, they played several more songs with Bob Weir and vocalist Shana Morrison. That set was later released in audio and video formats as a part of GSW's 25th Anniversary Boxed Set.

In 2013, rock supergroup Hard Working Americans featuring Dave Schools, Todd Snider and Neal Casal recorded their debut album Hard Working Americans at TRI. There was no webcast.

Recording engineers on staff have included John Cutler, Mike McGinn, Dennis "Wiz" Leonard, Rick Vargas and Brad Dollar.
