= Roots and Wings (Neal Casal album) =

Studio album by Neal Casal
- Released: January 27, 2009
- Genre: singer-songwriter
- Label: Fargo

Neal Casal chronology
All Directions (2008)	Roots and Wings (2009)	Sweeten the Distance (2011)

Professional ratings
Review scores
Source	Rating
Mojo	4/5 stars
Uncut	link

Roots and Wings is the ninth studio album by singer-songwriter Neal Casal, released January 27, 2009, on Fargo Records. Casal states that the album is his favorite and that it is "about making peace with the past, and it's about the ocean."

Upon release, Casal posted the following on his blog:

Big day for me here. After lots of hard work Roots and Wings is finally released. Best record i’ve ever made by a long long mile, i’m immensely proud of it. Massive thanks to all of the unbelievable musicians who played on it, Sadie and Megan for their beautiful art, Shoko for putting the site together, Fargo and Goatee records for getting the word out, all at Topspin, G$, Don Sternaker for the sounds, my brothers in The Cardinals, all of my friends who hung with me through it, and y’know, everyone really.

== Track listing ==
1. "The Losing End Again"
2. "Back to Haunt You"
3. "Signals Fading"
4. "Traveling Lighter"
5. "Tomorrow's Sky"
6. "Hereby The Sea"
7. "So Far Astray"
8. "Cold and the Darkness"
9. "Year and a Day"
10. "Cold Waves"
11. "Turn for the Worse"
12. "Superhighway"
13. "Keep The Peace"
14. "Don't Mind The Black Clouds"
15. "Pray Me Home"
16. "Chasing Her Ghost"
