= So Alive (Ryan Adams song) =

Single by Ryan Adams

from the album Rock n Roll
- Released: 19 January 2004
- Genre: Rock
- Label: Lost Highway Records
- Songwriter: Ryan Adams / Johnny T. Yerington
- Producer: James Barber

Ryan Adams singles chronology
"Nuclear" (2002)	"So Alive" (2004)	"This Is It" (2004)

Music video
- "So Alive" on YouTube

"So Alive" is a song by singer-songwriter Ryan Adams from his 2003 album Rock n Roll. The song was co-written with Johnny T. Yerington and was released as a single in January 2004.

In a 2003 interview with VH1, Adams talked about the song's background: "It was the last song [on the album] to have lyrics. It was the last day of making the record. I got up... walked down to Stuyvesant City Cove and watched the boats go by... I wanted to write a song about how romantic I was feeling. [The song] has a super big falsetto. I don't know where the hell that came from."

The song was Adams' biggest hit overseas, reaching No. 21 on the UK Singles Chart.

== Music video ==
A music video for "So Alive", shot by Doug Aitken, was produced in late 2003. The video features Adams performing the song as he wanders through a surreal desert dreamscape characterized by snakes, giant spider webs, scraggly bushes and overall desolation. It was the subject of a behind-the-scenes "Making The Video" special on MTV2, shot at Raleigh Studios in Los Angeles. In the special, Adams refers to the "nightmare scenarios" depicted in the video, while producer/first assistant director Peter Murray calls it "a journey of the mind". Throughout the shoot Adams is seen clowning around, cracking jokes with the crew and generally having a good time.

== B-Sides ==
The various "So Alive" singles contain several Rock n Roll outtakes as b-sides, including "Ah, Life", "Don't Even Know Her Name", "I'm Coming Over", and "Luxury".

"Ah, Life", "Don't Even Know Her Name", and "I'm Coming Over" were also released on the Moroccan Role EP in 2004.

Additionally, a limited edition 7" vinyl single was released with a 4-track recording of "Come Pick Me Up" as the b-side.

== Track listings ==
So Alive CD1
Lost Highway 986 1610

1. "So Alive" (LP version)
2. "Ah, Life" (non-album track)
3. "Don't Even Know Her Name" (non-album track)
4. "So Alive" (music video)

So Alive CD2
Lost Highway 986 1611

1. "So Alive" (LP version)
2. "I'm Coming Over" (non-album track)

So Alive Promo CD
Lost Highway RYANCPD5

1. "So Alive" (radio edit)
2. "So Alive" (LP version)

7" Vinyl Single
Lost Highway B394947-D1

1. "So Alive" (LP version)
2. "Luxury" (non-album track)

Limited Edition 7" Vinyl Single
Lost Highway MRNR-02487-7

1. "So Alive" (LP version)
2. "Come Pick Me Up" (original 4-track version)

== Personnel & Production Credits ==
- Ryan Adams — guitar, bass, vocals, and almost all instruments
- Johnny T. Yerington — drums
- Produced by James Barber

"Ah, Life" / "Don't Even Know Her Name" / "I'm Coming Over" / "Luxury"

- Ryan Adams — guitar, vocals
- Johnny T. Yerington — drums
- Tony Shanahan — bass guitar
- Produced by Ryan Adams & Eli Janney

"Come Pick Me Up (Original 4-Track Version, Jacksonville, NC)"

- Produced by Allen Midgett

== Chart performance ==
Chart (2004)	Peak position
Irish Singles Chart	38
Netherlands (Dutch Single Top 100)	97
UK Singles Chart	21
