= Hard Working Americans =

American rock supergroup

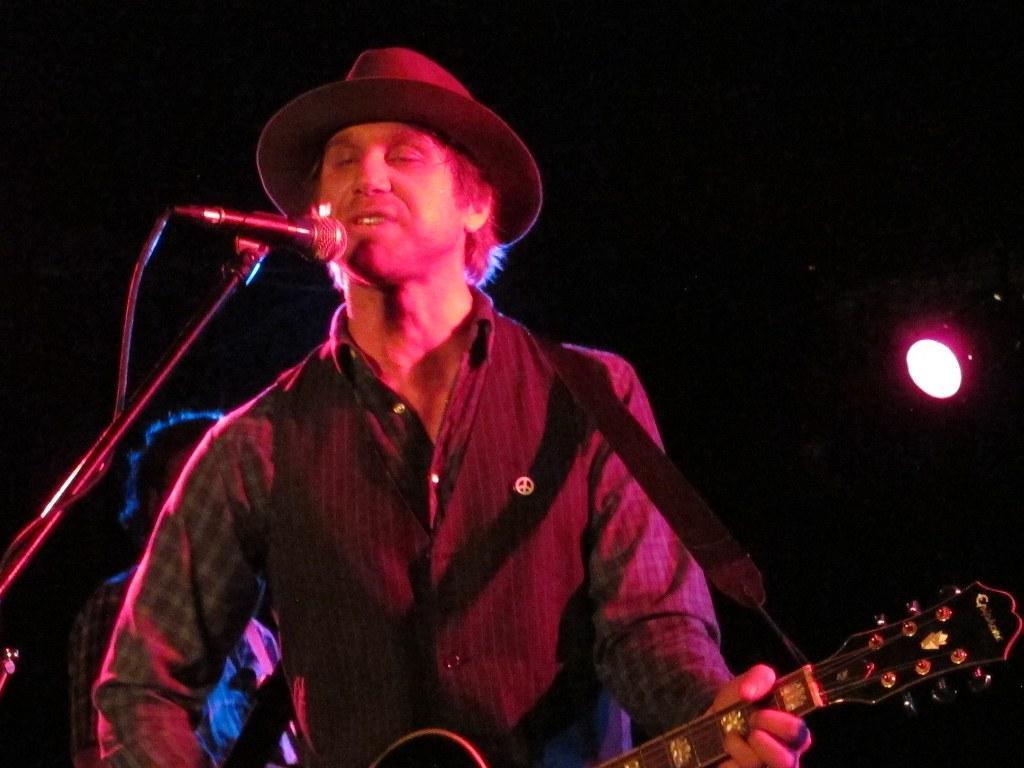
- Vocalist Todd Snider

Background information
- Origin: Boulder, Colorado, United States
- Genres: Blues rock, Southern rock
- Years active: 2013–present
- Label: Thirty Tigers/Melvin Records
- Spinoff of: Widespread Panic
- Members: Dave Schools; Duane Trucks; Chad Staehly; Jesse Aycock
- Past members: Todd Snider; Neal Casal
- Website: thehardworkingamericans.com

Hard Working Americans is an American rock supergroup formed in 2013. The band consists of bassist Dave Schools from Widespread Panic, Chad Staehly of Great American Taxi on keyboards and Duane Trucks, also from Widespread Panic, younger brother to Derek, on drums. Guitarist and vocalist Neal Casal died in 2019.

== History ==
Their debut performance was December 20, 2013 at a Boulder, Colorado benefit for Colorado Flood Relief. They embarked on a US Tour shortly thereafter.

Their self-titled debut album Hard Working Americans was recorded in 2013 at Bob Weir's TRI Studios in San Rafael, California. It is composed entirely of cover songs from artists ranging from Randy Newman to Drivin N Cryin. The album was produced by Schools and Snider, and was mixed by John Keane. John Popper guests on harmonica. Hard Working Americans was released on January 21, 2014, on Thirty Tigers/Melvin Records.

In 2016, the band released their second album, Rest in Chaos, which, unlike their previous record, is composed primarily of original songs written by the band themselves. The exception is the track "The High Price of Inspiration", written by Guy Clark for his album My Favorite Picture of You. Clark has a cameo speaking, and also plays guitar on the track. Rest in Chaos was written and recorded live as the band was finishing their first tour; using Snider's poetry to start the lyric, he finished the songs after principal recording was complete. The album was produced by band member Dave Schools, and also featured the addition of Jesse Aycock to the band's lineup. Longtime friend and collaborator Elizabeth Cook sings on the track "Massacre".

In 2019, founding guitarist Neal Casal died.

In November 2025 vocalist Todd Snider died.

== Members ==
=== Current members ===
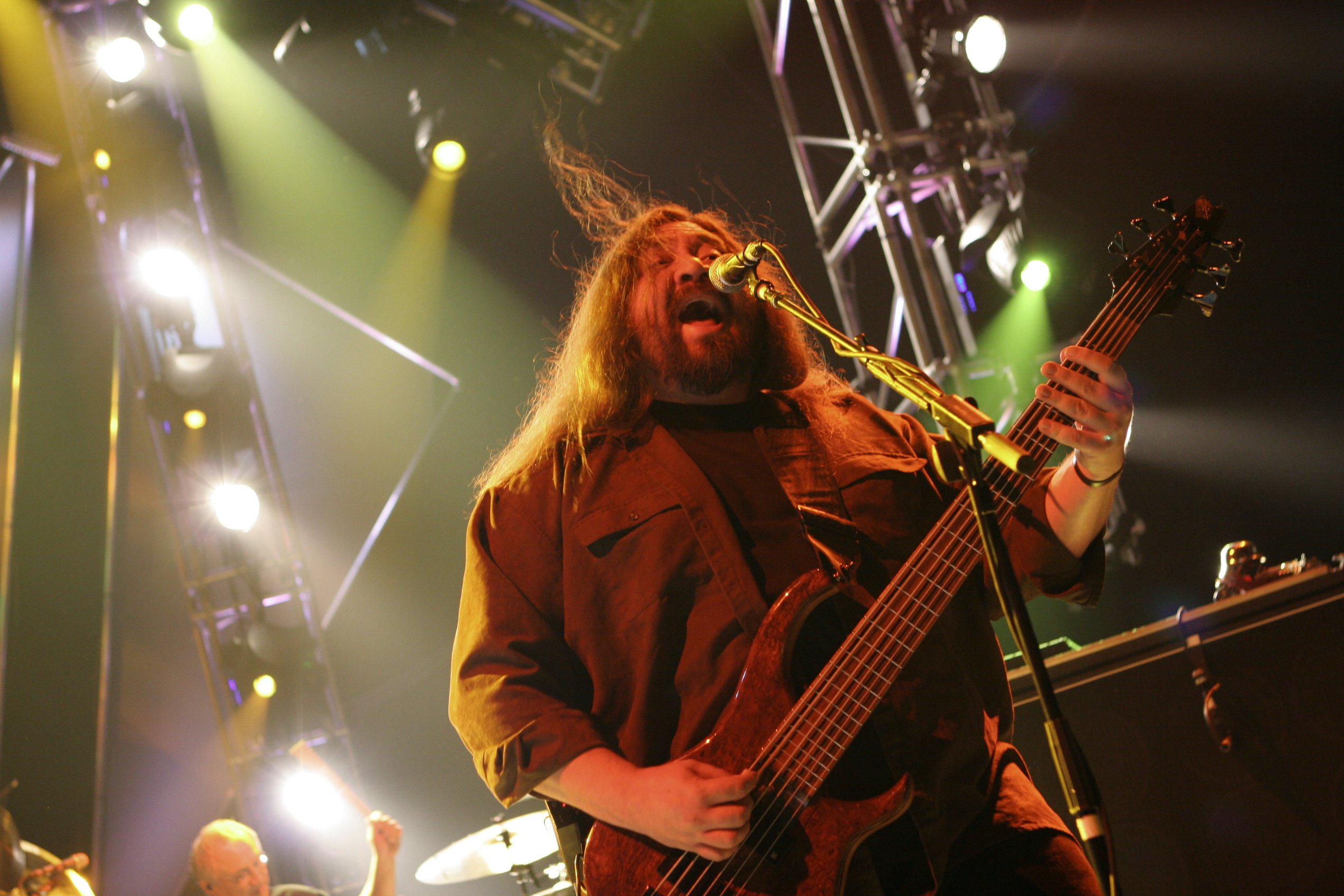
Bass guitarist Dave Schools.

- Dave Schools - bass (2013-present)
- Chad Staehly - keyboards (2013-present)
- Duane Trucks - drums (2013-present)
- Jesse Aycock - guitar (2016-present)

=== Former members ===
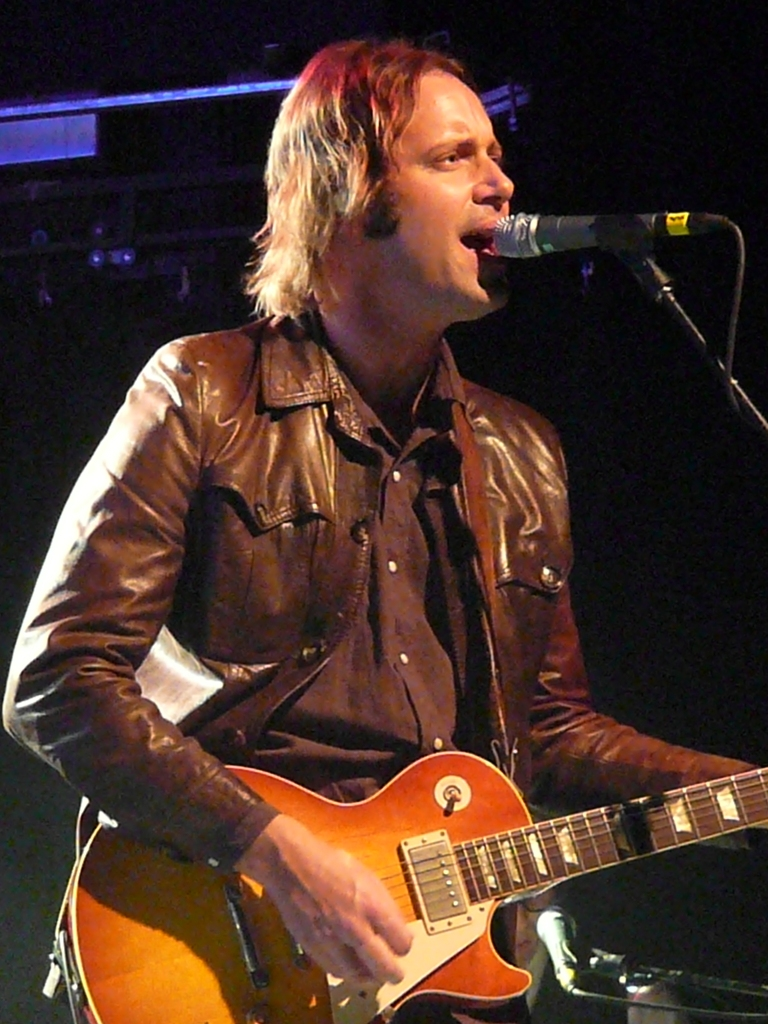
Guitarist Neal Casal died in 2019.

- Neal Casal - guitar, vocals (2013–2019; his death)
- Todd Snider - vocals (2013-2025; his death)

== Releases ==
=== Studio albums ===
- Hard Working Americans (2014, Thirty Tigers / Melvin Records)
- Rest in Chaos (2016, Melvin Records)

=== Live albums ===
- The First Waltz (2014, Melvin Records)
- We're All In This Together (2017, Thirty Tigers / Melvin Records)

=== Singles ===
- "Down to the Well" (2013, Thirty Tigers / Melvin Records)
- "Stomp and Holler" (2014)
- "Opening Statement" (2016)
