= Neal Casal =

American musician (1968–2019)

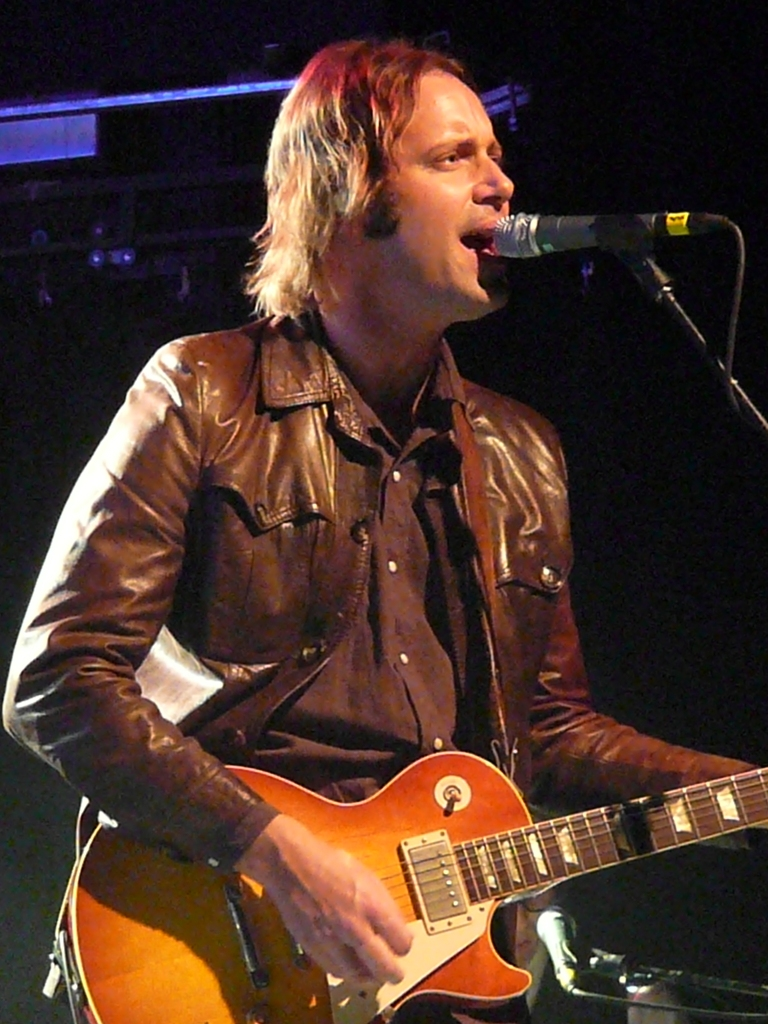
- Casal in concert in 2008

Background information
- Born: November 2, 1968
- Origin: Denville, New Jersey
- Died: August 26, 2019 (aged 50)
- Genre: Rock
- Occupations: Musician; singer; songwriter
- Instruments: Guitar; vocals; piano; bass; drums
- Years active: 1988–2019
- Labels: Zoo Records, Fargo Records, Glitterhouse Records
- Formerly of: Ryan Adams and The Cardinals, Blackfoot, Beachwood Sparks, Hazy Malaze, Chris Robinson Brotherhood, Hard Working Americans, Circles Around the Sun, GospelbeacH
- Website: nealcasal.com

Neal Graeme Casal (November 2, 1968 – August 26, 2019) was an American guitarist, singer, songwriter and photographer. First rising to prominence as lead guitar with Rickey Medlocke's Blackfoot from 1988 to 1993, he was also known as a member of Ryan Adams' backing band the Cardinals from 2005 until 2009, with whom he recorded three studio albums. He played in several groups, including the Chris Robinson Brotherhood, Hard Working Americans, Beachwood Sparks, The Skiffle Players, GospelbeacH and Circles Around the Sun– and released twelve albums as a solo artist.

He released his final solo album, Sweeten the Distance, in 2011.

Born in Denville Township, New Jersey, and raised in nearby Rockaway Township, Casal attended Morris Knolls High School.

== Solo career ==
=== 1990–1999 ===
Casal began work on early solo demos from 1990 to 1993 at studios in Los Angeles, New York and New Jersey. During this period he teamed up with his manager Gary Waldman, keyboard player John Ginty and vocalist Angie McKenna. After signing a publishing deal with Warner/Chappell Music, he forged a long standing professional relationship with producer/engineer Jim Scott.

In 1994, Casal signed with Zoo Entertainment and recorded his debut album at Palacio del Rio, formerly owned by James Stewart and Dean Martin in Santa Ynez, California, with producer Jim Scott. The album featured musicians Don Heffington, Bob Glaub, Greg Leisz. Casal released Fade Away Diamond Time in September 1994 to critical acclaim and supported the album on a US tour with his band.

Casal parted ways with Zoo Records in 1996 and recorded "Rain, Wind, and Speed" released by Buy or Die Records.

In 1997, Casal signed with the Glitterhouse Records label and went on to release five albums, including Field Recordings and The Sun Rises Here which also features Greg Leisz, drummer Don Heffington and longtime Bonnie Raitt bassist James "Hutch" Hutchinson on bass and backing vocals. In 1998, Casal released the self-produced album Basement Dreams, named Americana Album of the Year in Mojo magazine.

During the spring of 1999, Casal teamed up with Six String Drag front man Kenny Roby and toured Europe, later that summer recording the live album Black River Sides.

=== 2000–2009 ===
Casal released his sixth solo album Anytime Tomorrow in 2000, produced by Jim Scott. Anytime Tomorrow was the last album to be released by Glitterhouse in 2000 and prompted an extensive European tour into early 2001.

In 2002, Casal co-wrote, produced and released the EP Ran On Pure Lightning collaborating with Shannon McNally and other musicians which included Benmont Tench, Greg Leisz, bassist James "Hutch" Hutchinson and Brent Rademaker. Around this time, Casal also started playing with bassist Jeff Hill and drummer Dan Fadel, forming Hazy Malaze.

Railroad Earth's 2002 album Bird in a House featured a cover version of Casal's song "Dandelion Wine".

Shortly after signing to Paris-based Fargo Records in 2003, Fargo released the compilation album Maybe California resulting in a European tour and Casal's first solo tour of Japan. The following year, Fargo released two compilation albums, Leaving Traces, a selection of Casal's original songs from 1994–2004, and Return in Kind, a compilation of covers and he began recording his eighth solo album.

Casal joined Ryan Adams and The Cardinals in 2005. In December of that year he embarked on his third Japanese tour, which featured his first photography exhibition and upon his return released No Wish to Reminisce in early 2006. The album, produced by Michael Deming (Beachwood Sparks, Lilys), took his music in a different direction from his previous work, with a more layered, psychedelic production. All Directions, a compilation album of live and unreleased songs, was released in 2007.

In 2009, Casal teamed up with engineer Don Sternecker and recorded and produced Roots and Wings. The album included musicians Jon Graboff, Greg Leisz, Johnathan Rice, Jeff Hill, Dan Fadel and Andy Goessling.

=== 2010–2019 ===
Casal began recording his tenth solo album in March 2010 with producer Thom Monahan. While Casal toured Europe, Fargo re-released the albums Basement Dreams and Rain, Wind and Speed.

On March 6 it was announced that Casal had joined the Chris Robinson Brotherhood.

Casal's tenth studio album, Sweeten the Distance, was released in November 2011.

In 2013, Casal joined Hard Working Americans alongside Todd Snider, Dave Schools, Chad Staehly and Duane Trucks. The supergroup's debut album Hard Working Americans was recorded at Bob Weir's TRI Studios in 2013 and released on January 21, 2014.

In 2015, Casal along with Adam MacDougall, Dan Horne and Mark Levy recorded five hours of music as Circles Around the Sun that was played as the pre-show and set break music at The Grateful Dead's Fare Thee Well concerts in Santa Clara and Chicago. These compositions were released later that year as the album Interludes for the Dead. Circles Around the Sun made its live debut at the 2016 Lockn' Festival at Oak Ridge Farm in Arrington, Virginia. In 2018, CATS released their second album Let It Wander.

In 2016, Casal joined three other Beachwood Sparks alums, Farmer Dave Scher, Dan Horne, and Aaron Sperske, and songwriter Cass McCombs to form The Skiffle Players. Their debut album Skifflin was released that year, followed by the Piffle Sayers EP and Skiff in 2018.

== Hazy Malaze ==
In the summer of 2002, while touring with Shannon McNally, Casal formed Hazy Malaze with fellow band members Dan Fadel and Jeff Hill. Their debut album Hazy Malaze was recorded and mixed at Village Recorders in Los Angeles in eleven days. Later that year they toured opening for Robert Randolph and the Family Band and during 2003 continued to tour the US, while beginning work on their second album Blackout Love.

In 2005, Hazy Malaze released their second album Blackout Love, supported by a French tour.

In 2009 Hazy Malaze released their third album Connections.

== Ryan Adams & The Cardinals ==
Casal joined Ryan Adams & The Cardinals in 2005, shortly after the release of Jacksonville City Nights, replacing J.P. Bowerstock, and toured the US in the summer of 2006, followed by a UK and European tour in the autumn.

In 2007, the Ryan Adams album Easy Tiger was released and went to number seven. on Billboard album chart, resulting in a yearlong world tour and the album's producer, Jamie Candiloro, added to the lineup on piano. Candiloro also produced the Follow the Lights EP, released in October 2007, and reaching number 40 on the US Billboard 200 chart.

In 2008, Ryan Adams & The Cardinals released Cardinology, recorded at Electric Lady Studios in New York and produced by Tom Schick. The album reached number 11 on Billboard album chart and number 14 on Rolling Stone's best albums of 2008 list. Rolling Stone magazine also placed "Magick" at No. 13 on the 100 Best Singles of 2008 list.

In January 2009, Adams announced that he was leaving The Cardinals after their final show on March 20, 2009 at the Fox Theatre in Atlanta. The band has been on indefinite hiatus ever since.

In December 2010, Ryan Adams & The Cardinals released their final album III/IV, a compilation of unreleased material. The album was recorded in 2006 during the same sessions that yielded Easy Tiger.

On April 16 Ryan Adams released Class Mythology, which is an EP of unreleased tracks recorded with the Cardinals during the Cardinology period.

In an interview with American Songwriter Casal described his experience with the group positively. "It really was a great lineup... For a couple years there, man, we were on fire. We really were. We were playing some amazing shows and running through Ryan's entire catalog, just burning those songs to the ground. We really felt confident for awhile [sic]. We had a lot of synergy, we were all really connected, and everyone believed in it. We were firing on all cylinders. It was a great thing to be a part of."

== Session work/collaborations ==
Casal contributed guitar work on Tift Merritt's 2005 album Tambourine, featuring Mike Campbell, which was nominated for a Country Album of the Year and three Americana Music Awards. Casal played on Gin Wigmore's 2009 album Holy Smoke produced by Mike Elizondo, which won four of the six New Zealand Music Awards it was nominated for and went Quadruple Platinum.

Willie Nelson's 2007 album Songbird produced by Ryan Adams and released by Lost Highway Records. Adams, along with The Cardinals, performed on the album's eleven tracks, featuring Casal on guitar and piano. Songbird peaked at No. 87 on the Billboard 200 on November 18, 2006.

Other artists who featured Casal as a session musician include Shooter Jennings, Phil Lesh, Lucinda Williams, Vetiver (band), Sera Cahoone, Vision Explored, Minnie Driver, Duncan Sheik, Dr. Zwig, The Jayhawks, and Amanda Shires.

== Photography ==
Casal was an avid photographer and provided photos for several albums which he appeared on as a musician. He shot the album cover photos for Easy Tiger and Follow the Lights and provided photos for Cardinology, Cardinals III/IV and Class Mythology. In 2010, Abrams Image published the photo book, Ryan Adams & the Cardinals: A View of Other Windows. The book is a photographic documentary of life playing and touring with the band.

Casal shot the album cover and all photos for the artwork for Sarah Lee Guthrie & Johnny Irion's album Bright Examples, the album cover for Courtney Jaye's The Exotic Sounds of Courtney Jaye, provided photographs for Danny and the Champions of the World album Streets of Our Time, the Hard Working Americans record "Rest In Chaos" and Tift Merritt's Tambourine.

In January 2008 Casal exhibited his photography at the Bauhaus Gallery in Tokyo. His photographs have appeared in publications such as Mojo, Rolling Stone, Spin, Harp, USA Today.

== Films and television ==
Director Ray Foley made a documentary about Casal's influences and inspirations during the making of his sixth album in 2001 entitled Neal Casal: Anytime Tomorrow.

In 2009, two Hazy Malaze songs were featured on Private Practice season three, episode seven "The Hard Part" and Casal's single "The Losing End Again" appeared in Fringe season two, episode seventeen "Olivia. In The Lab. With The Revolver.".

Casal was Owen Wilson and Vince Vaughn's voice coach for the 2004 movie Starsky & Hutch and played guitar on Owen Wilson's performance of "Don't Give Up On Us" which was also featured on the soundtrack.

Casal sang the lead vocals on "The Game" on "The Music of Jason Crigler", released on Rudy Records. Casal co-wrote and sang backing vocals on "The Truest Kind", on the album Danny and The Champions of The World.

In 2011, Casal worked as Garrett Hedlund's guitar instructor for the movie Country Strong and also appears in the film as Gwyneth Paltrow's guitar player.

== Death ==
Casal died by suicide on August 26, 2019, at age 50.

== Legacy ==
In 2020, the Neal Casal Music Foundation was founded to honor his memory. In addition to preserving his artistic legacy, the NCMF provides musical instruments and lessons to students in New Jersey and New York state schools an donations to mental health organizations that support musicians in need.

On July 20, 2021, Highway Butterfly: The Songs of Neal Casal, a 3-CD tribute compilation of cover versions by various performers, was released through the Neal Casal Music Foundation. Contributing artists included Marcus King, Eric Krasno, Phil Lesh, Susan Tedeschi, Derek Trucks, Jimmy Herring, Oteil Burbridge, Bob Weir, Warren Haynes, Steve Earle, Billy Strings, Dori Freeman and The Allman Betts Band.

On March 4, 2022, the collection was re-released on vinyl as a 5-LP box set.

== Discography ==
=== Solo ===
Studio albums

- Fade Away Diamond Time (1995)
- Rain, Wind and Speed (1996)
- Field Recordings (1997)
- The Sun Rises Here (1998)
- Basement Dreams (1999)
- Black River Sides (with Kenny Roby) (1999)
- Anytime Tomorrow (2000)
- Ran on Pure Lightning (with Shannon McNally) (2002)
- Return in Kind (2004)
- No Wish to Reminisce (2006)
- Roots and Wings (2009)
- Sweeten the Distance (2011)
- No One Above You (The Early Years 1991-1998) (2025)

=== Compilations ===
- An introduction to Neal Casal - maybe California (2003)
- Leaving Traces (2004)
- All Directions (2008)

=== With Hazy Malaze ===
- Hazy Malaze (2003)
- Blackout Love (2004)
- Connections (2009)

=== With Ryan Adams and the Cardinals ===
- Easy Tiger (2007)
- Follow the Lights (2007)
- Cardinology (2008)
- III/IV (2010)
- Class Mythology (2011)

=== With Chris Robinson Brotherhood ===
- Big Moon Ritual (2012)
- The Magic Door (2012)
- Betty's SF Blends Vol 1 (2013)
- Phosphorescent Harvest (2014)
- Try Rock N' Roll, EP (2014)
- Betty's Blends Vol 2: Best from the West (2015)
- Anyway You Love, We Know How You Feel (2016)
- If You Lived Here You Would Be Home by Now (2016)
- Betty's Blends Vol 3: Self Rising Southern Blends (2017)
- Barefoot in the Head (2017)
- Raven's Reels Vol 1 (2018)
- Servants of the Sun (2019)

=== With Hard Working Americans ===
- Hard Working Americans (2014)
- Rest in Chaos (2016)
- We're All in This Together (2017)

=== With GospelbeacH ===
- Pacific Surf Line (2015)
- Let it Burn (2019)

=== With Circles Around The Sun ===
- Interludes For The Dead (2015)
- Let It Wander (2018)
- Circles Around The Sun Meets Joe Russo (2019)
- Circles Around The Sun (2020)

=== Album collaborations ===
- Blackfoot - Medicine Man (1991) - Guitar, vocals
- Various artists - Piss & Vinegar: The Songs of Graham Parker - Black Honey (1996) - Guitar, vocals
- Tom Flannery - Song About a Train (1998) -- Guitar and vocals
- James Iha — Let It Come Down (1998) — Guitar and harmonies
- Various artists - A Christmas to Remember — Cora Jones (1998) — Casal's original song, vocals, guitar and percussion
- Angie Mckenna - Looking East (1999) - Production, guitar, piano, vocals
- Todd Thibaud — Little Mystery (1999) — Guitar
- Bill Kelly - Jumbo (2000) - Guitar
- Lucinda Williams — Caravan of Dreams (2001) — Guitar
- Amy Allison - Sad Girl (2001)- Guitar
- Duncan Sheik — Daylight (2002) — Sang harmonies
- Ileen - Bride Pt.2 (2002) - Guitar
- Dayna Manning — Shades (2002) — Guitar
- Robert Randolph and the Family Band — Unclassified (2004) — Sang harmonies
- Tift Merritt — Tambourine (2004) — Guitar and harmonies
- Mia Doi Todd — Manzanita (2005) — Guitar
- Emily Loizeau - L'Autre Bout du Monde (2005) - Guitar
- Willie Nelson — Songbird (2006) — Guitar
- Minnie Driver — Seastories (2007) — Guitar
- Jason Crigler - The Music Of Jason Crigler - (2008) Guitar
- Danny and the Champions of the World - Danny and the Champions of the World (2008)- Harmonies
- Clarence Bucaro - Til Spring (2009)- Guitar
- Gin Wigmore — Holy Smoke (2009) — Guitar
- Mark Olson — Many Colored Kite (2010) — Guitar and bass
- Sarah Lee Guthrie and Johnny Irion — Bright Examples(2011) — Guitar and piano
- Bryan Greenberg — We Don't Have Forever (2011) — Guitar and bass
- Levi Strom - The Lone Wolf (2011) - Piano
- Amanda Shires — Carrying Lightning (2011) — Guitar and harmonies
- Ryan Adams — Ashes & Fire (2011) — Backing vocals, acoustic guitar
- Vetiver - The Errant Charm (2011) - Guitar
- Beachwood Sparks - The Tarnished Gold (2012)- Guitar, vocals
- Music Is Love - A Singer Songwriter's Tribute to the Music Of CSN&Y (2012)
- James Iha — Look to the Sky (2012) — Vocals/harmonies
- Fruit Bats - Tripper (2012) - Guitar
- Dan Grimm - Average Savage (2014) - Guitar
- Matt Waldon - Learn to Love (2014) - Guitar
- Mark Olson - Good-bye Lizelle (2014) - Guitar, Bass
- Medicine Hat - Whiskey and Waves (2015) - Guitar
- Vetiver - Complete Strangers (2015) - Guitar
- J.E. Borgen - Roots Down Deep (2016) - Guitar
- The Tyde - Darren 4 (2016) - Guitar
- The Orchard - The Great Unknown (2017) - Guitar, harmonica
- Jeff Grimes - More Than Memory (2017) - Guitar
- Danielle Hicks and the Resistance - Honey (2017) - Guitar
- Dori Freeman - Letters Never Read (2017) - Guitar
- Johnny Irion - Driving Friend (2018) - Guitar
- Emma Scott - It Was Worth It (2018) - Harmonies
- Fruit Bats - Gold Past Life (2019) - Guitar
- Little Wings - Ropes (2019) - Guitar

=== Song collaborations ===
- Shelby Starner single — "Don't Let Them" (1999)
- Zoolander soundtrack — Rufus Wainwright song "He Ain't Heavy, He's My Brother"(2001) — Guitar
- The Sun Records Tribute album — Good Rockin' Tonight, The Legacy of Sun Records — Sheryl Crow song "Who Will the Next Fool Be" (2001) — Guitar
- Badly Drawn Boy single — "Spitting in the Wind" (2001)
- Starsky & Hutch soundtrack — song "Don't Give Up on Us" (2004) — Guitar
- "More Townes Van Zant" by The Great Unknown (2010)
