= Catherine Popper =

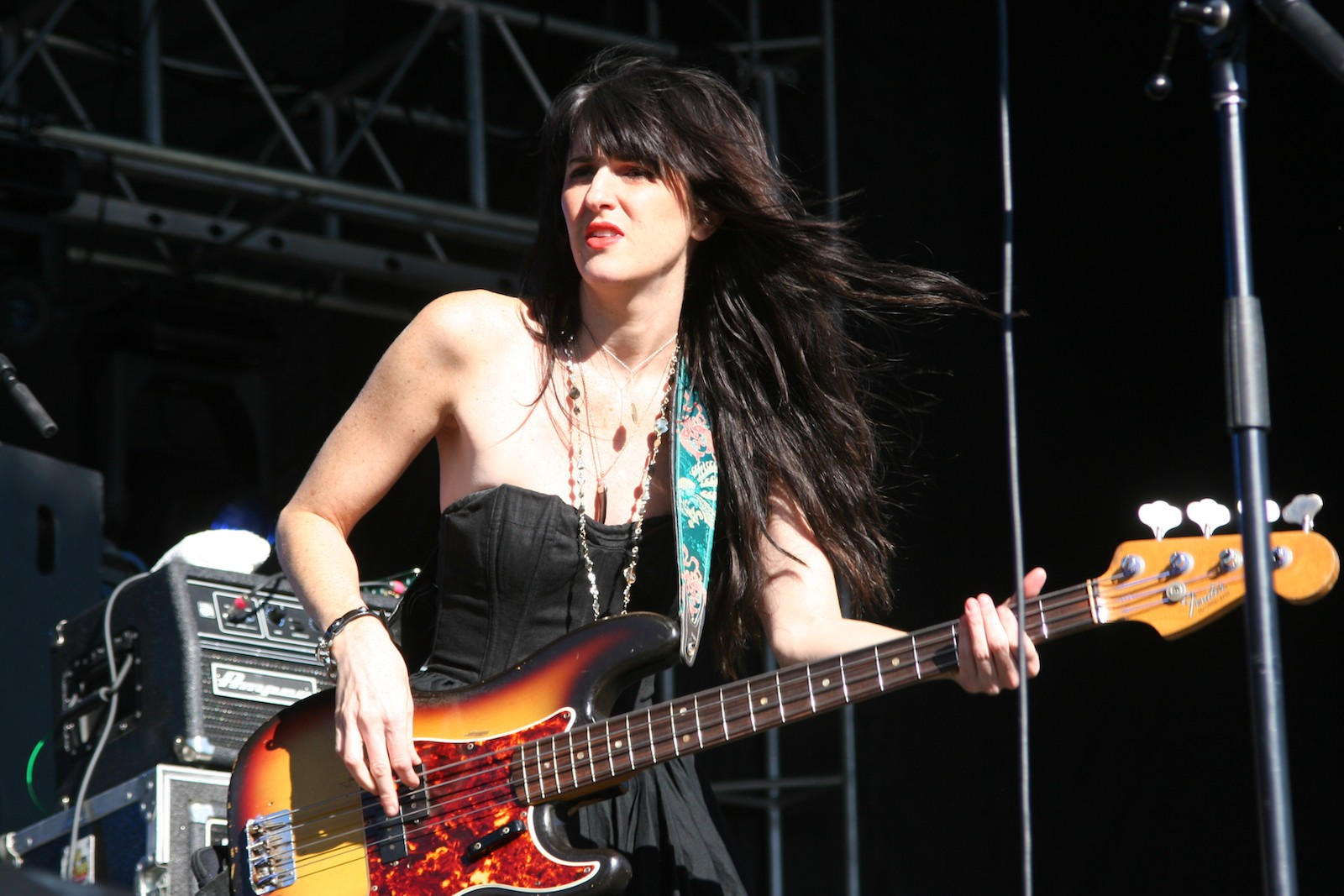
- Popper performing in 2010

Background information
- Born: December 28, 1973 (age 52); Charlotte, North Carolina
- Genres: Rock and roll, folk rock, blues rock, alternative country, country rock
- Occupation: Session musician
- Instruments: Bass guitar, guitar
- Years active: 2000–present
- Member of: Puss n Boots, Jesse Malin
- Formerly of: Ryan Adams, Grace Potter and the Nocturnals, Jack White

Catherine Popper (born December 28, 1973) is an American bass guitarist, singer and songwriter. She is best known for her work with Jesse Malin, Ryan Adams & the Cardinals, Grace Potter and the Nocturnals and Jack White. Popper is also a member of a trio called Puss n Boots with Norah Jones and Sasha Dobson. She released her first single, “Maybe It’s All Right” on Velvet Elk Records in 2020.

== Early life ==
Popper was born and raised in Charlotte, North Carolina. She started playing upright bass when she was 9 years old, and attended the North Carolina School of the Arts for high school where she studied classical string bass. For college, she studied jazz bass at the Manhattan School of Music.

== Career ==
From 1999 to 2004, Popper played double bass and sang back up vocals for Hem. From 2004 to 2006, Popper played bass, double bass and sang back up vocals for Ryan Adams with his backing group, The Cardinals. She also shared songwriting credits for many songs on the band's albums. Starting in 2009, Popper joined Grace Potter and the Nocturnals on tour and for the band's self-titled fifth album Grace Potter and the Nocturnals, released on June 8, 2010. The album was produced by Mark Batson and debuted at #19 on the Billboard Top 200 Albums. On November 14, 2011, Popper announced her departure from Grace Potter and the Nocturnals for the "foreseeable future" on her Facebook page.

In January 2012, Popper appeared on Late Show with David Letterman, performing "Travel As Equals" with Joseph Arthur. In 2013, Popper appeared on four tracks on Joseph Arthur's tenth studio album, The Ballad of Boogie Christ.

In May 2012, she replaced Bryn Davies in Jack White's all-female band "The Peacocks".

In April 2013 Popper appeared on Mike Doughty's crowd funded album Circles Super Bon Bon.... She then toured with Mike Doughty and drummer Pete Wilhoit in support of the album between October 16, 2013, and November 23, 2013.

In December 2013 and June 2014, Popper performed with Molly and the Zombies with Brian Fallon of The Gaslight Anthem, Brian McGee of Plow United and Randy Schrager of the Scissor Sisters. The group released five songs for free online. Since 2015, Popper has played bass and provided back up vocals for Jesse Malin's backing group and she has appeared on all of his releases since then. She also appeared on Nothing Is Anywhere, the 2016 album by Malin's band D Generation. In July 2016 she was again with Grace Potter & The Nocturnals in Guitar Center Sessions.

In 2023 she performed her two solo releases "Maybe It's All Right" and her cover of Pere Ubu's "Breath on Norah Jones' "Playing Along" podcast.

In August of 2023, she backed Bonnie Raitt at the Americana Music Honors & Awards and in September of that same year played three shows with Jason Isbell.

== Discography ==
with Hem

- Rabbit Songs (2001)
- Eveningland (2004)
- No Word From Tom (2006)

with Ryan Adams and the Cardinals

- Cold Roses (2005)
- Jacksonville City Nights (2005)
- III/IV (2010)

with Willie Nelson

- Songbird (2006)

with Rachael Yamagata

- Elephants...Teeth Sinking Into Heart (2008)

with Grace Potter and the Nocturnals

- Grace Potter and the Nocturnals (2010)

with Joseph Arthur

- The Ballad of Boogie Christ (2013)

with Mike Doughty

- Circles Super Bon Bon (2013)

with Jack White

- Lazaretto (2014)

with Puss n Boots

- No Fools, No Fun (2014)
- Dear Santa EP (2019)
- Sister (2020)

with Levon Helm

- The Midnight Ramble Sessions Vol 3 (2014)

with Jesse Malin

- New York Before The War (2015)
- Outsiders (2015)
- Meet Me At The End Of The World (2017)
- Sunset Kids (2019)
- Lust for Love (2020)

with Brian Fallon

- Painkillers (2016)

with D Generation

- Nothing Is Anywhere (2016)

with Bash And Pop

- Anything Could Happen (2016)

with She And Him

- Christmas Party (2016)

with Manolo Garcia

- Geometria del Rayo (2018)

Broadway Cast Recordings

- Head Over Heels Broadway cast recording (2018)
- Diana cast recording (2020)

Film and Television

- Short Bus (2006)
- Vinyl: Music From The HBO Original Series Vol 1 (2016)
- The Only Living Boy in New York (2017)
- The Irishman (2019)
- Marvelous Miss Maisel (2019)
- The Joker (2019)
