= Puss n Boots =

American alternative country band

- Origin: Brooklyn, New York, United States
- Genres: Alternative country
- Years active: 2008–present
- Labels: Blue Note
- Members: Norah Jones; Sasha Dobson; Catherine Popper

Puss n Boots is an American alternative country band from Brooklyn, New York, formed in 2008 that consists of members Norah Jones, Sasha Dobson and Catherine Popper. Their debut full-length album, No Fools, No Fun, was released on July 15, 2014, through Blue Note Records.

== History ==
=== Formation (2008-2013) ===
The group formed in 2008 when Jones began playing Brooklyn venues to practice guitar, with the help of Dobson. They were then joined by Popper, and the three began working together to expand creatively. Some of the group's early shows were in front of friends and done just for fun as they covered songs they loved. In an interview with The Boston Globe published July 17, 2014, Jones describes the first shows as "never stressful because it was loose and nobody was coming but our friends." Dobson adds, "We were just playing shows and coming together as our schedules went along. It was just about playing music and not having an agenda of any kind." In a July 2014 interview with SiriusXM, they described the formation of the band:

"Sasha booked a gig at a pool hall for us to learn guitar on ... So, that’s how we started playing guitar, because Sasha and I, we were already singers," said Norah. "We learned enough chords on guitar to get Catherine here to play with us ... We played a lot of gigs when we were all in town just kinda to get together and have fun. And then finally we sounded like a band enough to where we thought we’d make a record."

Since the group came together each member has made attempts at trying new instruments they weren't previously accustomed to. For Jones and Dobson it was guitar (and also drums for Dobson), and for Popper it was pedal steel guitar.

=== No Fools, No Fun (2014-present) ===
After years of playing small and occasional shows around New York City, the band decided in early 2014 to make a full-length album. On April 21, 2014, a Blue Note Records press release announced that the band would release its debut full-length album, titled "No Fools, No Fun", on July 15, 2014.

In support of the album, Puss n Boots toured during the summer and fall of 2014. Along with clubs, the band performed at numerous festivals including the Clearwater Festival, Green River Festival and the Newport Folk Festival. The band then opened for Neil Young during his tour in July 2015.

== Band members ==
(Adapted from No Fools, No Fun liner notes)

Current members

- Norah Jones – vocals, electric guitar (2008–present)
- Sasha Dobson – vocals, drums, acoustic guitar, bass (2008–present)
- Catherine Popper – vocals, bass, acoustic guitar (2008–present)

== Discography ==
Studio albums

- No Fools, No Fun (2014)
- Sister (2020)

EP

- Dear Santa (2019)
