= Sasha Dobson =

American singer-songwriter

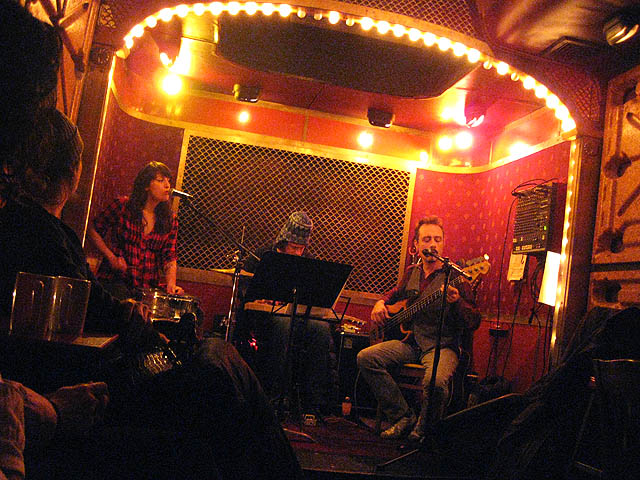
- Sasha Dobson (left) in 2009

Background information
- Born: March 31, 1979 (age 47); Santa Cruz, California, U.S.
- Genres: Jazz, alternative, Americana
- Occupations: Singer, songwriter, guitarist, drummer
- Member of: Puss n Boots
- Website: sashadobson.com

Sasha Dobson (born March 31, 1979) is an American jazz singer from Santa Cruz, California.

== Early life ==
Dobson comes from a musical family. Her father, Smith Dobson (Smith Weed Dobson IV, 1947–2001) was a pianist who recorded with Mark Murphy and played with Bobby Hutcherson. Her mother Gail is also a singer, and her brother Smith (Smith Weed Dobson V) is a tenor saxophonist, drummer, and vibraphonist. The family performed at the Monterey Jazz Festival in 1991 when Dobson was twelve.

== Career ==
Her debut album, Modern Romance, was released in August 2006 by Jesse Harris's Secret Sun Recordings label. Dobson participated in the Norah Jones The Fall tour, providing guitar, percussion, and vocal harmonies. She was the opening act on the tour. Her album Aquarius was released in 2013. Dobson is a member of the trio Puss n Boots with Jones and Catherine Popper.

== Discography ==
- The Darkling Thrush with Chris Byars (Smalls, 2004)
- Introducing Sasha Dobson (Juniper 2004)
- Modern Romance (Secret Sun 2006)
- Burn (360 Sound 2010)
- Aquarius (Creek Valley 2013)
- Into the Trees (2014)
- Simple Things (2020)
