= Love Is Hell (Ryan Adams album) =

- Standard album cover (Note: The Love Is Hell pt. 1 and Love Is Hell pt. 2 EPs use cropped versions of the same image. The Japanese edition 2CDs of the full album uses a blue filter on the picture.)

Studio album by Ryan Adams
- Released: May 4, 2004
- Recorded: New York, September 2 to September 6, 2002; and New Orleans, February 2003
- Genres: Alternative country; alternative rock
- Length: 68:01
- Label: Lost Highway
- Producers: Ryan Adams; John Porter

Ryan Adams chronology
Rock n Roll (2003)	Love Is Hell (2004)	Cold Roses (2005)

Singles from Love Is Hell
- 1. "Wonderwall" Released: June 28, 2004

Love Is Hell is the fifth studio album by American musician Ryan Adams, released on May 4, 2004, by Lost Highway Records. The album was originally released as two EPs, Love Is Hell pt. 1 and Love Is Hell pt. 2, at the insistence of Lost Highway, who deemed that the album was not commercially viable. A full-length version of the album was released when the EPs proved to be more of a commercial success than anticipated. Love Is Hell features guest contributions from Marianne Faithfull and Greg Leisz, as well as Fabrizio Moretti and Leona Naess on certain bonus tracks.

== Background and release ==
Love Is Hell was initially rejected by Adams's label Lost Highway, who had deemed its sound as "too alternative rock" and considered it not to be commercially viable. As a result, Adams recorded Rock n Roll in two weeks, which was released as his official fourth studio album on November 4, 2003, and the content of Love Is Hell was released as two EPs: Love Is Hell pt. 1 on the same day as Rock n Roll and Love Is Hell pt. 2 on December 9. The EPs were eventually combined into one album, which was released on May 4, 2004 as Adams's fifth studio album. The Oasis cover "Wonderwall" was released as a single from Love Is Hell in the UK on June 28, 2004. The album was released in Japan on June 27, 2007 with a bonus disc of tracks recorded during the same sessions as the album.

The track "The Shadowlands" was written backstage in Belfast on November 26, 2002, with Adams performing it as his opening song. The track "Anybody Wanna Take Me Home" was included on both Rock n Roll and Love Is Hell, although in different versions. As it appears on Rock n Roll, the song is 4:46 long and features a fade out and fade-back-in effect, whereas the Love Is Hell version is longer, clocking at 5:31, and does not include the fade effects.

Adams's version of "Wonderwall" was made available as downloadable content for the 2008 video game Guitar Hero World Tour as part of an acoustic pack in January 2009.

== Composition ==
Adams described the album as sounding "a lot like Heartbreaker, but better and more severe. It's complex and it's damaged," and stated that it "was the record [he] needed to make." In a 2007 interview, he noted that he loves to play songs from the album live, and that the songs are "usually tunes that The Cardinals and myself get really excited about when they come up in the set."

== Critical reception ==
Professional ratings
Review scores
Source	Rating
AllMusic	4/5 stars
Blender (Love Is Hell pt. 1)	3/5 stars
Drowned in Sound (Love Is Hell pt. 1)	8/10
Mojo (Love Is Hell pt. 1)	5/5 stars
Mojo (Love Is Hell pt. 2)	5/5 stars
NME	9/10
Pitchfork	3.1/10
Q (both EPs)	4/5 stars
Rolling Stone	4/5 stars
Spin (Love Is Hell pt. 1)	B−

Love Is Hell received mixed to positive reviews from critics. On Metacritic, which assigns a normalized rating out of 100 to reviews from mainstream publications, the Pt. 1 EP received an average score of 74 based on 16 reviews, while Pt. 2 received an average score of 78 based on 12 reviews. Both scores indicate "generally favorable reviews".

In a positive review for Rolling Stone, Bill Crandall opined that Adams's label were wrong when they told him that Love Is Hell was "not [his] best stuff" and wrote that the album "is an exquisite portrait of the artist as a tired young man: tired of love, tired of fame and, most of all, tired of lonely nights spent in the Chelsea Hotel [sic]". Writing for the same publication, Tom Moon called the Pt. 2 EP "seven riveting explorations that don't sound like anything else in [Adams's] songbook", although he felt that "they're not all stunners".

John Robinson of NME compared the way Lost Highway released Rock n Roll and Love Is Hell to "[having] thrown away the fruit, and chosen to heavily promote the banana peel", viewing Love Is Hell as "an album that actually is classic rock 'n' roll rather than one that can simply impersonate it" like Rock n Roll. Rob Brunner of Entertainment Weekly gave Love Is Hell pt. 1 a B+ and similarly criticized Lost Highway's marketing strategy, asking "what were they thinking?" He said of the EP that "the writing is tighter, the production cleaner, and the performances more considered" than on Rock n Roll and cited the "pointless" cover of "Wonderwall" as his "only real disappointment". Reviewing Love Is Hell pt. 2 for the same publication, Will Hermes gave it a B and wrote that "song for song, the EPs trump Rock n Roll", but felt that Adams gave off an image of "a scattershot chameleon instead of [...] an artist who digs deep".

In separate reviews of Love Is Hell pt. 1 and Pt. 2, Stephen Thomas Erlewine of AllMusic gave both EPs 3.5 stars out of 5, while his review of the full album shows a rating of 4 stars out of 5. Referring to Adams as "a synthesist more than a stylist", he compared various songs from the album to multiple rock singer-songwriters and bands such as Jeff Buckley, Bob Dylan, Leonard Cohen, and the Smiths, noting that Love Is Hell coproducer John Porter had worked with the latter. However, while he deemed them both as "tribute albums", Erlewine called Love Is Hell "more carefully considered in its production and writing" than Rock n Roll. In a joint review of Rock n Roll and both Love Is Hell EPs, Matt Dentler of The Austin Chronicle rated Pt. 1 3.5 stars and Pt. 2 3 stars out of 5. He wrote that Love Is Hell is "far more dense and dark" and "spotty" than Rock n Roll, but called the songs "a fun challenge to crack open" and highlighted "Political Scientist" for its "delicate melodies" as well as Adams's cover of "Wonderwall", which Dentler called "surprisingly smart".

In a negative review, Hartley Goldstein wrote for Pitchfork that "Adams is, at heart, an extremely gifted songwriter" but panned his prolificness, feeling that Love Is Hell is "a collection of preposterously cheerless (and charmless) songs that try much too hard to achieve a poignancy — or anything, really — that might hide their complete insignificance". However, he cited the songs "English Girls Approximately" and "Hotel Chelsea Nights" as highlights, describing them as "happy accidents" and "moments of clarity" on the record. Similarly, the Uncut review of the Pt. 1 EP called it "an utterly gloomungous affair with barely a crack of light piercing the lowering clouds of misery", although it praised the bonus track "Halloween".

== Track listing ==
All tracks are written by Ryan Adams, unless otherwise stated.

Love Is Hell – Standard version
No.	Title	Writer(s)	Length
1.	"Political Scientist"		4:33
2.	"Afraid Not Scared"		4:13
3.	"This House Is Not for Sale"		3:53
4.	"Anybody Wanna Take Me Home"		5:31
5.	"Love Is Hell"		3:19
6.	"Wonderwall"	Noel Gallagher	4:09
7.	"The Shadowlands"		5:18
8.	"World War 24"		4:17
9.	"Avalanche"		5:09
10.	"My Blue Manhattan"		2:23
11.	"Please Do Not Let Me Go"		3:37
12.	"City Rain, City Streets"		3:49
13.	"I See Monsters"		3:57
14.	"English Girls Approximately"		5:42
15.	"Thank You Louise"		2:52
16.	"Hotel Chelsea Nights"		5:10

Love Is Hell – Japanese version bonus disc
No.	Title	Length
1.	"Halloween"	3:52
2.	"Caterwaul"	5:41
3.	"Fuck the Universe"	7:29
4.	"Twice as Bad as Love"	4:14
5.	"Father's Son"	3:36
6.	"Gimme Sunshine"	3:55
7.	"Black Clouds"	4:48

Love Is Hell – French version
No.	Title	Writer(s)	Length
1.	"Political Scientist"		4:33
2.	"Afraid Not Scared"		4:13
3.	"This House Is Not for Sale"		3:53
4.	"Love Is Hell"		3:19
5.	"Wonderwall"	Noel Gallagher	4:09
6.	"The Shadowlands"		5:18
7.	"World War 24"		4:17
8.	"Avalanche"		5:09
9.	"Caterwaul"		5:41
10.	"Halloween"		3:52
11.	"My Blue Manhattan"		2:23
12.	"Please Do Not Let Me Go"		3:37
13.	"City Rain, City Streets"		3:49
14.	"I See Monsters"		3:57
15.	"English Girls Approximately"		5:42
16.	"Thank You Louise"		2:52
17.	"Hotel Chelsea Nights"		5:10
18.	"Fuck the Universe"		7:29
19.	"Twice as Bad as Love"		4:14

=== Extended plays ===
Love Is Hell pt. 1
No.	Title	Writer(s)	Length
1.	"Political Scientist"		4:34
2.	"Afraid Not Scared"		4:13
3.	"This House Is Not for Sale"		3:54
4.	"Love Is Hell"		3:19
5.	"Wonderwall"	Noel Gallagher	4:09
6.	"The Shadowlands"		5:19
7.	"World War 24"		4:18
8.	"Avalanche"		5:09
Total length:			34:48

Love Is Hell pt. 1 – UK bonus tracks
No.	Title	Length
9.	"Caterwaul"	5:43
10.	"Halloween"	3:51

Love Is Hell pt. 2
No.	Title	Length
1.	"My Blue Manhattan"	2:23
2.	"Please Do Not Let Me Go"	3:38
3.	"City Rain, City Streets"	3:49
4.	"I See Monsters"	3:58
5.	"English Girls Approximately"	5:42
6.	"Thank You Louise"	2:53
7.	"Hotel Chelsea Nights"	5:13
Total length:		27:30

Love Is Hell pt. 2 – UK bonus tracks
No.	Title	Length
8.	"Fuck the Universe"	7:31
9.	"Twice as Bad as Love"	4:14

== Chart positions ==
=== Album ===
Country	Peak position
Belgium (Flanders)	87
UK	62

=== Extended plays ===
==== Love Is Hell pt. 1 ====
Country	Position
UK	62
US	78
Norway	14
Ireland	21
Sweden	36

==== Love Is Hell pt. 2 ====
Country	Position
UK	114
Ireland	69

=== Singles ===
Year	Single	Chart	Peak position
2004	"Wonderwall"	UK Singles Chart	27

== Personnel ==
- Ryan Adams – vocals, guitars, piano, and other instruments
- Marianne Faithfull – backing vocals (track 14)

=== New York Band ===
These musicians appear on tracks 1, 2, 3, 4, 5, 12, 14

- Paul Garisto – drums
- Johnny Pisano – bass
- Joe McGinty – piano
- Johnny McNabb – lead guitar

=== New Orleans Band ===
These musicians appear on tracks 6, 7, 8, 9, 10, 11, 13, 15, 16

- Greg Leisz – lead guitar, pedal steel
- Ricky Fataar – drums on all except 10, 11, 13, 15
- James "Hutch" Hutchinson – bass on all except 13, 15
- Ian McLagan – B3 organ, Wurlitzer electric piano on all except 11, 13, 15, 16
- Jon Cleary – piano, Wurlitzer electric piano, rhythm guitar on all except 10, 11, 13
- Ruth Gottlieb – violin on all except 11, 16
- Sarah Wilson – cello on all except 11, 16

=== Bonus tracks ===
- Fabrizio Moretti – drums ("Halloween")
- Leona Naess – backing vocals ("Caterwaul")
