= Cold Roses =

Studio album by Ryan Adams and the Cardinals
- Released: May 3, 2005
- Recorded: Loho (New York City)
- Genres: Alternative country, country rock
- Length: 76:11 (84:37 with bonus tracks)
- Label: Lost Highway Records (B0004343-02)
- Producer: Tom Schick

Ryan Adams chronology
Love Is Hell (2004)	Cold Roses (2005)	Jacksonville City Nights (2005)

Professional ratings
Aggregate scores
Source	Rating
Metacritic	(69/100)
Review scores
Source	Rating
AllMusic	4/5 stars
Robert Christgau	(1-star Honorable Mention)
Drowned in Sound	(8/10)
Entertainment Weekly	B
The Music Box	4/5 stars
NME	(7/10)
Pitchfork	(7.2/10)
PopMatters	4/10 stars
Rolling Stone	3.5/5 stars
Uncut	4/5 stars

Cold Roses is the sixth studio album by alt-country singer-songwriter Ryan Adams, released on May 3, 2005 on Lost Highway. The album is his first with backing band The Cardinals, and the first of three albums released in 2005.

Cold Roses has sold 159,000 copies in the United States.

Although all the tracks can fit on a standard 80-minute disc, it was released as a double album with packaging and CDs designed to make it look like a vinyl LP. The album was also released in a standard 2-disc jewel case.

== Background ==
While performing in Liverpool in January 2004, Adams broke his left wrist when he slipped off the stage and fell six feet into the orchestra pit below. A painful recovery and rehab period followed over the next several months, as Adams relocated to his hometown of Jacksonville, North Carolina, and slowly relearned how to play guitar. "There would be tears streaming down my face as I struggled to play Black Sabbath songs,” he later said. During this difficult time, Adams was inspired by Jerry Garcia's playing because "he wasn’t afraid to fuck up". This fascination with The Grateful Dead and Bob Dylan pointed Adams in a new musical direction, and his next band - christened The Cardinals - was conceived as a loose, spacious musical collective.

== Writing and composition ==
In 2011, Adams claimed that "How Do You Keep Love Alive" was written while he was high on opium: "I fully understand when people say Edgar Allan Poe used to smoke this stuff and have visions. I wrote the entire song "How Do You Keep Love Alive" without writing a word down, and I played it on piano. And I've tried to understand the chord pattern ever since, because I can't fuckin' play it."

== Reception ==
The album so far has a score of 69 out of 100 from Metacritic based on "generally favorable reviews". USA Today gave it three-and-a-half stars out of four and said, "What makes this hard-to-pigeonhole country/folk/ punk/pop-rocker remarkable is the quality of the quantity. There's not a bad song in Cold Roses' 18-track bouquet, and at least 13 are worth instant iPod enshrining." The Guardian gave it a score of four stars out of five and said of Ryan Adams: "The boy wonder is back in the saddle." Chicago Tribune gave it a favorable review and called it "Adams' most ambitious effort to date." The A.V. Club gave it a favorable review and said it "feels fantastic--as pretty and affecting as a slow sunset." Spin gave it a score of seven out of ten and said, "There's an air of formal exercise here.... But if you can ride with the cliches, you won't fault the execution." E! Online gave it a B− and said, "Even if it is twice as long as it needs to be (thus, a couple of dead spots), we're not arguing. We're just enjoying the music."

Some reviews are average or mixed: The Austin Chronicle gave it a score of three stars out of five and called it "Adams' double-album hubris". Neumu.net gave it a score of six stars out of ten and called it "a relaxed and ambitious collection that confirms Ryan Adams' reputation as a top-notch singer and songwriter who easily jumps styles and evokes comfortable sadness with every turn." Tiny Mix Tapes gave it a score of three stars out of five and called it an "18-track monster". Paste also gave it a score of three stars out of five and said it "comes as a bit of relief, bereft of the posturing that so often attends Adams’ work.... That said, there’s also a sense of retreat that permeates the record, a willingness to offer the comforts of familiar tones instead of ambitiously taking chances." Playlouder gave it a score of two-and-a-half stars out of five and called it "A frustratingly self indulgent and inconsistent double album that pitches itself somewhere between the classic country rock of 2001's 'Gold' and the lovelorn despair of 2004's 'Love Is Hell'." Flak Magazine gave it a mixed review and said, "Without the first disc, the double disc Cold Roses wouldn't be half bad."

== Track listing ==
All tracks are written by Adams, Bowersock, Cashdollar, Pemberton and Popper.

Disc one
No.	Title	Length
1.	"Magnolia Mountain"	5:53
2.	"Sweet Illusions"	5:02
3.	"Meadowlake Street"	4:29
4.	"When Will You Come Back Home"	4:52
5.	"Beautiful Sorta"	3:01
6.	"Now That You're Gone"	3:52
7.	"Cherry Lane"	4:32
8.	"Mockingbird"	4:47
9.	"How Do You Keep Love Alive"	3:12

Disc two
No.	Title	Length
1.	"Easy Plateau"	5:12
2.	"Let It Ride"	3:24
3.	"Rosebud"	2:56
4.	"Cold Roses"	4:36
5.	"If I Am a Stranger"	4:39
6.	"Dance All Night"	3:15
7.	"Blossom"	3:15
8.	"Life Is Beautiful"	4:29
9.	"Friends"	4:45

Bonus tracks
No.	Title	Length
1.	"Tonight" (Vinyl and UK release only, also released as an iTunes exclusive album-only track)	3:29
2.	"So Hot, So Cold" (Japan and UK Bonus Track)	3:20
3.	"Operator, Operator" (Japan Bonus Track)	1:46

== Performers ==
- Ryan Adams – Vocals, acoustic and electric guitar, harmonica, piano, bass guitar on "Blossom", all instruments on "Life Is Beautiful"
- J. P. Bowersock – Electric guitar
- Brad Pemberton – Drums, vocals
- Catherine Popper – Bass guitar, vocals, piano
- Rachael Yamagata – Vocals and piano on "Let It Ride", "Cold Roses" and "Friends"
- Cindy Cashdollar – Steel Guitar, Dobro

== Charts ==
Chart performance
Chart (2005)	Peak position
Australian Albums (ARIA)	31
Belgian Albums (Ultratop Flanders)	27
Belgian Alternative Albums (Ultratop Flanders)	20
Canadian Albums (Nielsen SoundScan)	40
Danish Albums (Hitlisten)	31
Dutch Albums (Album Top 100)	48
Dutch Alternative Albums (Alternative Top 30)	2
German Albums (Offizielle Top 100)	39
Irish Albums (IRMA)	16
Italian Albums (FIMI)	45
New Zealand Albums (RMNZ)	30
Norwegian Albums (VG-lista)	9
Scottish Albums (Official Charts)	19
Swedish Albums (Sverigetopplistan)	8
UK Albums (Official Charts)	20
UK Country Albums (Official Charts)	1
US Billboard 200	26
