= Rock n Roll (Ryan Adams album) =

Studio album by Ryan Adams
- Released: November 4, 2003
- Recorded: Stratosphere Sound; Chelsea, Manhattan, New York
- Genres: Rock, indie rock
- Length: 48:43
- Label: Lost Highway
- Producer: James Barber

Ryan Adams chronology
Demolition (2002)	Rock n Roll (2003)	Love Is Hell (2004)

Singles from Rock n Roll
- 1. "So Alive" Released: January 19, 2004; 2. "This Is It" Released: March 22, 2004

Rock n Roll is the fourth studio album by Ryan Adams, released on November 4, 2003. The album features the hit single "So Alive", and includes guest appearances by Adams's then-girlfriend, actress Parker Posey, former Hole and Smashing Pumpkins bass player Melissa Auf der Maur, and Green Day's Billie Joe Armstrong. Adams describes the album as "the most rock thing I have ever done," and notes that in spite of the album's mixed reception, recording it was "fun as fuck."

The album was recorded in two weeks, in response to Lost Highway's refusal to release Love Is Hell. The ensuing standoff was resolved "by being very diplomatic," according to Adams. Rock n Roll became the primary product, while Love Is Hell was released quietly as two separate EPs, and eventually combined into a single release.

The album was recorded at Stratosphere Sound, guitarist James Iha's studio in Chelsea, Manhattan, New York.

== Reception ==
Professional ratings
Aggregate scores
Source	Rating
Metacritic	66/100
Review scores
Source	Rating
AllMusic	3/5 stars
Blender	5/5 stars
Entertainment Weekly	B
The Guardian	2/5 stars
Los Angeles Times	3/4 stars
NME	7/10
Pitchfork	2.9/10
Q	3/5 stars
Rolling Stone	4/5 stars
Spin	B+

The album so far has a score of 66 out of 100 from Metacritic based on "generally favorable reviews". The Austin Chronicle gave it a score of four stars out of five and said, "The Love Is Hell discs are far more dense and dark, making the songs a fun challenge to crack open, though it isn't difficult to determine what a no-brainer it must have been for Lost Highway to favor the brilliant Roll over the more spotty Hell discs." Spin gave it a score of seven out of ten and said, "Everywhere the guitars are cranked, the sneakers set on stun." Alternative Press gave it a score of three-and-a-half stars out of five and said, "The jarring stylistic shifts sometimes make listening to RNR feel more like scanning the radio dial than listening to a CD." In his Consumer Guide, Robert Christgau gave the album a one-star honorable mention while picking out two songs from the album ("Note to Self: Don't Die" and "This Is It"), and quipped about Adams: "Sound effects, emotional affects, he's got 'em all."

Some reviews are average, mixed or negative: Yahoo! Music UK gave it a score of six stars out of ten and said, "Adams can undoubtedly pen this classic rawk stuff with his ears closed and, as a result, the 15 tracks here lack heart." No Ripcord also gave it a score of six stars out of ten and said, "No matter how clichéd and predictable this record gets, there are always some undeniable hooks to lure you back in before your patience wears thin." Playlouder gave it a score of three stars out of five and said, "There are tunes galore, and ideas that some groups would do someone in for, it’s just a shame he decided to do an approximation of all his favourite bands, and didn’t try something a bit more progressive than 'Rock‘n’Roll'." Chicago Tribune gave it a mixed review and said that "Adams devotes himself almost entirely to his rock impulses. The problem is that his writing and vocals aren't as consistently distinctive or convincing in the rock arena. He aims for the intensity of Kurt Cobain and Paul Westerberg on some tracks and croons like Jon Bon Jovi on another. It's not until the melancholy "Wish You Were Here" that Adams slows the tempo and delivers the intimacy that characterized his earlier solo work, most of which was four-star quality." The Guardian gave it a score of two stars out of five and said that "Adams is too busy winking, smirking and showing off to convey anything approaching an emotion." Drowned in Sound gave the album a score of three out of ten and called it "the worst record Ryan Adams has ever put his name to; a mess of identikit garage buffoonery and amateurish production, filled with rushed lyrics and written-in-a-weekend tunes."

== Track listing ==
All tracks are written by Ryan Adams, unless otherwise noted.

No.	Title	Writer(s)	Length
1.	"This Is It"	Ryan Adams, Johnny T. Yerington	3:19
2.	"Shallow"		4:05
3.	"1974"		3:07
4.	"Wish You Were Here"	Ryan Adams, Brad Rice	3:00
5.	"So Alive"	Ryan Adams, Johnny T. Yerington	3:58
6.	"Luminol"	Ryan Adams, Johnny T. Yerington, Tony Shanahan	3:25
7.	"Burning Photographs"	Ryan Adams, Johnny T. Yerington	4:12
8.	"She's Lost Total Control"		3:05
9.	"Note to Self: Don't Die"	Ryan Adams, Parker Posey	2:14
10.	"Rock n Roll"		2:00
11.	"Anybody Wanna Take Me Home"		4:46
12.	"Do Miss America"		2:30
13.	"Boys"	Ryan Adams, Johnny T. Yerington	3:32
14.	"The Drugs Not Working"		5:34
15.	"Funeral Marching" (Japanese bonus track)		4:22
16.	"Hypnotixed" (French bonus track)		3:35

== Personnel ==
- Ryan Adams - Composer, Costume Design, Guitar, Keyboards, Bass Guitar, Multi Instruments, Vocals, Voices, Vocals (Background)
- Billie Joe Armstrong - Vocals (Background)
- Melissa Auf der Maur - Vocals (Background)
- Jamie Candiloro - Audio Engineer, Bass Guitar, Engineer, Mixing, Organ (Hammond), Surround Mix
- Jonathan Flaugher - Bass Guitar
- Paul Garisto - Drums
- Joe McGinty - Piano
- Joe McGrath - Engineer, Piano
- Johnny McNab - Guitar
- Johnny Pisano - Bass Guitar
- Parker Posey - Vocals (Background)
- Tony Shanahan - Bass Guitar
- Johnny T - Drums, Voices

== Chart positions ==
=== Album ===
Country	Peak position
US	33
Germany	71
Ireland	11
Netherlands	81
Norway	19
Sweden	29
UK	41

=== Singles ===
Year	Single	Chart	Peak position
2004	"This Is It"	-	-
2004	"So Alive"	Dutch Top 100	97
2004	"So Alive"	Irish Singles Chart	38
2004	"So Alive"	UK Singles Chart	21
