= Chris Feinstein =

American musician (1967–2009)

- Feinstein performing at the Wellmont Theatre in Montclair, New Jersey, February 23, 2009

Background information
- Also known as: Spacewolf
- Born: Christopher Todd Feinstein; May 26, 1967; Nashville, Tennessee, US
- Died: December 15, 2009 (aged 42) New York City, New York, US
- Occupations: Bass guitarist; record producer; songwriter
- Instruments: Bass guitar; guitar; drums
- Years active: 1982–2009
- Formerly of: Shadow 15; The Questionnaires; Bedlam; Iodine; Ryan Adams & The Cardinals; Santogold; Albert Hammond Jr.; Rufus Wainwright; Sean Lennon; Moby; Fat Joe; Northern State; Chantal Kreviazuk; Tim Finn; Patty Griffin; Willie Nelson; Rufus Wainwright; The Astrojet; Gin Wigmore; Minnie Driver; Clara Venus; Mikki James

Christopher Todd Feinstein (May 26, 1967 – December 15, 2009) was an American bass guitarist, record producer, and songwriter from Nashville, Tennessee. Feinstein's career began at the age of 15, recording and touring in bands (Shadow 15, The Questionnaires, Bedlam, Iodine), which led him to widen his studio skills where he became interested in production and recording artist development.

In 1997, Feinstein moved to New York City to pursue his career in production. He became a partner in a production team based at the infamous TMF Studios in the East Village. While at TMF, he teamed up with Detroit native, producer/engineer Michael Tudor to co-produce a series of recordings of New York rock bands such as The Astrojet (featuring Jody Porter of Fountains of Wayne), Clara Venus and Mikki James. Together, Feinstein and Tudor co-produced material for the Beatles-based soundtrack to the 2001 drama film I Am Sam, featuring Rufus Wainright and Sean Lennon's "Across the Universe" and Howie Day's "Help!". They also co-produced Moby's singles "South Side" (featuring Gwen Stefani) and We Are All Made of Stars. During this time, Feinstein also contributed musically to several artists' albums such as Fat Joe's Loyalty, Chantal Kreviazuk's Juno Award-winning Colour Moving and Still, Tim Finn's Say It Is So and Patty Griffin's Flaming Red.

In 2006, Feinstein was sought after to play bass guitar for Ryan Adams & The Cardinals. During this time he also became known as Space Wolf. As a Cardinal he recorded three albums, Easy Tiger (2007), Follow the Lights EP (2007) and Cardinology (2008) and toured extensively worldwide through 2009.

The last album he recorded playing bass guitar was New Zealand artist Gin Wigmore's Holy Smoke produced by Mike Elizondo and engineered by Joe Chiccarelli.

Growing up, Feinstein enjoyed listening to The Clash, Hüsker Dü, The Replacements, David Bowie, The Rolling Stones, The Who and Brian Wilson.

== Death ==
On December 15, 2009, Feinstein was found dead in his New York City apartment. He was 42 years old. Feinstein's death was ruled an accident by the coroner, stemming from prior health issues and adverse reaction to over-the-counter cough medicine

== Discography ==
Year	Title	Artist	Instrument
2009	Holy Smoke	Gin Wigmore	Bass, percussion
2008	Cardinology	Ryan Adams & the Cardinals	Co-writer, bass, background vocals
2008	Santogold	Santogold	Co-writer, guitar
2007	Everybody Knows	Ryan Adams	Bass
2007	Follow the Lights (EP)	Ryan Adams	Bass
2007	Can I Keep This Pen?	Northern State	Co-writer, guitar, bass
2007	Seastories	Minnie Driver	Bass
2007	Easy Tiger	Ryan Adams	Bass
2007	Yours to Keep (US)	Albert Hammond, Jr.	Bass
2007	Second Time Around	Nell Bryden	Guitar
2006	Go – The Very Best of Moby	Moby	Mixing
2006	Yours to Keep (UK)	Albert Hammond, Jr.	Bass
2006	Sinners Like Me	Eric Church	Bass
2005	From Midnight On	Nell Bryden	Guitar
2005	Greatest Hurts	Clara Venus	Guitar, producer, percussion, tambourine
2004	Everything Changed	Abra Moore	Bass
2003	The Bridge	Shaye	Bass
2003	Regret Over the Wires	Matthew Ryan	Vocals (background)
2003	Electrotech (Ministry of Sound)	Various artists	Mixing
2003	Decadence Pure Global Chillout	Various artists	Mixing
2003	Dancestar 2002	Various artists	Mixing
2003	Best Dance Album in the World...Ever!	Various artists	Mixing
2002	Loyalty	Fat Joe	Bass
2002	Clubber's Guide to Ibiza 2001 (Universal International)	Various artists	Mixing
2002	Now, Vol. 52 (UK)	Various artists	Mixing
2002	Karma Lounge, Vol. 2	Various artists	Mixing
2002	Addicted to Trance	Various artists	Mixing
2002	Here Comes the Trick	Pleasure Club	Bass, drums
2002	Electric	Jack Ingram	Bass
2002	I Am Sam (Motion picture soundtrack)	Various artists	Bass, guitar, mixing, percussion, producer
2002	Thinking Room	Anika Moa	Bass
2001	Thinking Room	Anika Moa	Bass
2000	Colour Moving and Still (Canada)	Chantal Kreviazuk	Bass
2000	Say It Is So	Tim Finn	Bass
2001	East Autumn Grin	Matthew Ryan	Bass, vocals (background)
1999	Anywhere but Here (Motion picture soundtrack)	Various artists	Co-writer, drums
1999	Greta Gaines	Greta Gaines	Bass
1998	Flaming Red	Patty Griffin	Bass, vocals (background)
1998	Falling Forward	Margaret Becker	Bass
1998	Baby Grand	Iodine	Co-writer, bass, design, vocals, photography
1996	Sweetie	Daniel Tashian	Bass, drums
1995	Maximum Joy	Iodine	Co-writer, bass, photography, background vocals
1992	Into the Coals	Bedlam	Bass, composer, background vocals
1992	EP	Bedlam	Bass, background vocals
1992	Reservoir Dogs (soundtrack album, two tracks)	Bedlam	Bass, background vocals
1991	Anything Can Happen	The Questionnaires	Co-writer, bass, background vocals
1989	Window to the World	The Questionnaires	Bass, background vocals
1986	Far Away	Shadow 15	Drums, background vocals
