= Jacksonville City Nights =

Studio album by Ryan Adams and the Cardinals
- Released: September 26, 2005
- Recorded: New York City, NY. Nashville, TN.
- Genres: Country rock, alternative country
- Length: 46:16
- Label: Lost Highway Records
- Producer: Tom Schick

Ryan Adams chronology
Cold Roses (2005)	Jacksonville City Nights (2005)	29 (2005)

Professional ratings
Aggregate scores
Source	Rating
Metacritic	(72/100)
Review scores
Source	Rating
AllMusic	4/5 stars
Chicago Tribune	(favorable)
Entertainment Weekly	C+
The Music Box	3.5/5 stars
Paste	(average)
Pitchfork	(7.7/10)
PopMatters	6/10 stars
Rolling Stone	3.5/5 stars
Uncut	4/5 stars
USA Today	1.5/4 stars

Jacksonville City Nights is the seventh studio album by American alternative country singer-songwriter Ryan Adams, released on September 26, 2005, and released in the US on September 27, 2005 on Lost Highway. The album is Adams' second with The Cardinals, and the second in a trilogy of albums released in a seven-month timespan during 2005. By 2007, the album had sold 100,000 copies in the United States and 158,000 worldwide. The album was recorded live in the studio, without overdubs. The title is a reference to Adams' hometown of Jacksonville, North Carolina, which has been referenced throughout his career.

Several limited American releases contained a DVD titled September (originally intended to be the title of the album), which featured a 20-minute documentary about the band on the road and in the studio. Bassist Catherine Popper is featured in the photograph on the album cover.

== Leak ==
In August 2005, two fans of Adams prematurely uploaded four tracks from Jacksonville City Nights to a fansite of Adams. In March 2006, Robert Thomas of Milwaukee and Jared Bowser of Jacksonville, Florida, two moderators of the fansite, were indicted by US federal court after the two had pled guilty to federal copyright violations. They had violated the Family Entertainment and Copyright Act (FECA), which establishes a federal crime for pirating music and movies before their official release to the public. If they had been convicted on all counts, they could have faced up to 11 years in prison. The case ended after Thomas and Bowser accepted a plea deal; they were able to bring down the felony counts to misdemeanors. Instead of the 11 years, they received two months of house arrest and two years of probation. Thomas was able to be removed from house arrest and probation early because of good behavior. Due to there being no proof of monetary loss to the record label, Thomas and Bowser did not have to pay the record label. While the case was ongoing, Thomas shut the fansite down but relaunched it after the case ended, missing the community.

== Reception ==
The album so far has a score of 72 out of 100 from Metacritic based on "generally favorable reviews". Spin gave it a B+ and said the album "reminds you why Adams was once a big deal." NME gave it a score of seven out of ten and said, "Adams could clearly make use of an editor here--but you can't possibly hate an album that uses pedal-steel on every track." Tiny Mix Tapes gave it a score of three-and-a-half stars out of five and said, "As with most Adams records, the fact that some of the songs made the cut is perplexing." However, Blender gave it three stars out of five and said, "It's the sound of a New Yorker coming home for a breath of country air." Prefix Magazine gave it an average review and said, "Perhaps Adams is just earning cheap sympathy with his strained, tour-weary voice, or maybe it's just too thrilling to hear him revisit Gram, but Jacksonville City Lights [sic] does seem to come by its sound honestly."

== Track listing ==
All lyrics are written by Ryan Adams; all music is composed by Adams, J.P. Bowersock, Pemberton, Catherine Popper and Jon Graboff except where indicated.

No.	Title	Length
1.	"A Kiss Before I Go"	2:05
2.	"The End" (Adams & Michael Panes)	3:44
3.	"Hard Way To Fall"	4:06
4.	"Dear John" (Adams & Norah Jones)	4:36
5.	"The Hardest Part"	2:52
6.	"Games"	2:11
7.	"Silver Bullets"	2:56
8.	"Peaceful Valley"	3:42
9.	"September"	2:30
10.	"My Heart Is Broken" (Adams & Caitlin Cary)	2:14
11.	"Trains" (Adams & Panes)	4:08
12.	"Pa"	3:52
13.	"Withering Heights"	2:53
14.	"Don't Fail Me Now"	4:27

Bonus tracks
No.	Title	Length
1.	"What Sin Replaces Love" (Demonstration recording)	9:27
2.	"What Sin Replaces Love" (Acoustic version)	3:51
3.	"Jeane"	2:33
4.	"Always on My Mind" (Johnny Christopher, Mark James and Wayne Carson Thompson)	4:41
5.	"I Still Miss Someone" (Johnny Cash cover) (Johnny Cash, Roy Cash)	2:58

== Chart positions ==
=== Album ===
Country	Peak position
US	33
Belgium (Flanders)	66
Germany	72
Ireland	43
New Zealand	40
Norway	16
Sweden	27
UK	59

== Musicians ==
=== The Cardinals ===
- Ryan Adams - vocals, acoustic guitar, piano
- J.P. Bowersock - electric guitars
- Catherine Popper - bass, piano, background vocals
- Brad Pemberton - drums, percussion
- Jon Graboff - pedal steel, background vocals

=== Other musicians ===
- Claudia Chopek: Violin.
- David Gold: Violin & Viola.
- Bob Hoffnar: Pedal steel.
- Byron Isaacs: Background vocals.
- Norah Jones: Piano & vocals.
- Julia Kent: Cello.
- Joe McGinty: Piano.
- Michael Panes: Violin.
- Johnny T: Drums.
- Glenn Patscha: Piano & background vocals.

=== The Nashville String Machine ===
The Nashville String Machine perform on the song "My Heart Is Broken" and are:

- Bergen White: Arranger and conductor.
- Violins: Carl Gorodetsky, Pamela Sixfin, Conni Ellisor, Allan Umstead, David Angell, Cathy Umstead & Mary Kathryn Vanosdale.
- Violas: Kris Wilkinson, Gary Vanosdale & Jim Grosjean.
- Cellos: Carole Rabinowitz & Bob Mason.
