= Brad Pemberton =

American drummer (born 1969)

Brad Pemberton (born August 8, 1969) is an American drummer, primarily known for his role in several bands backing Ryan Adams, including The Sweetheart Revolution, The Damn Band, The Pinkhearts and The Cardinals. Pemberton previously played in Iodine (with Cardinals bassist Chris Feinstein). He has also toured with Brendan Benson. In February 2016 Brad Pemberton was announced as the new drummer with Steve Earle and The Dukes.

== Discography ==
Artist	Album	Year
Iodine	Maximum Joy	1995
Daniel Tashian	Sweetie	1996
Iodine	Baby Grand	1998
Heather Nova	Truth and Bone	1998
Patty Griffin	Flaming Red	1998
Stateside	Twice As Gone	2002
Ryan Adams	Demolition	2002
Adrienne Young	Plow To The End Of The Row	2004
Jerry Castle	Back Side Of Down	2004
Ryan Adams and the Cardinals	Cold Roses	2005
Ryan Adams and the Cardinals	Jacksonville City Nights	2005
Cerys Matthews	Never Said Goodbye	2006
Willie Nelson	Songbird	2006
Mark Huff	Gravity	2007
Alternate Routes	Good & Reckless & True	2007
Ryan Adams	Easy Tiger	2007
Warren Pash	Plastic Rulers	2007
Minnie Driver	Seastories	2007
Ryan Adams and the Cardinals	Follow The Lights	2007
Jessie Baylin	Firesight	2008
Ryan Adams and the Cardinals	Cardinology	2008
John Paul	Belmont Boulevard	2008
Gin Wigmore	Holy Smoke	2009
Steve Earle & The Dukes	So You Wannabe an Outlaw	2017
Steve Earle & The Dukes	Guy	2019
