= Loho Studios =

Recording studio in New York City, United States

Loho Studios is a New York City recording studio. Founded in 1983 by brothers Edward and Victor Luke, it began as a rehearsal studio but, with the addition of recording equipment, over time became a full-fledged recording studio. Loho's Lafayette Street location quickly became a home for New York-area recording artists.

The studio is now located at 48 Clinton Street on the Lower East Side of Manhattan.

Loho has recorded music for artists such as Ryan Adams, Blues Traveler, Rosanne Cash, The Heroine Sheiks, The Everly Brothers, Art Garfunkel, John Mayer, O.A.R., Lindsay Lohan, Joan Jett, Speedsters and Dopers, Gina Gershon, Yo La Tengo, Willie Nelson, Billy Squier, Patti Smith, Phish, Joey Ramone, P.P.M., They Might Be Giants and a host of many more, both mainstream and independent artists.

In 1996, Loho Studios privately purchased the Rolling Stones Mobile Studio for recording use in the United States.

In 2007, Loho Studios was sold to The Blue Man Group who now use the space for rehearsals, recordings and auditions. The facility has since reopened its doors (after hours) for public use once again.
