= List of alternative country musicians =

This is a listing of bands and musicians in the alternative country genre.

== 0–9 ==
- 16 Horsepower

== A ==
- Ryan Adams
- American Aquarium
- Jill Andrews
- The Autumn Defense
- The Avett Brothers

== B ==
- Backyard Tire Fire
- Del Barber
- Eef Barzelay
- Bear's Den
- Rico Bell
- Ryan Bingham
- Blitzen Trapper
- Blue Rodeo
- Bosque Brown
- The Bottle Rockets
- BR549
- Boy Golden
- Jim Bryson
- Richard Buckner

== C ==
- Caitlin Cary
- Neko Case
- Rosanne Cash
- The Civil Wars
- Commander Cody and His Lost Planet Airmen
- Cross Canadian Ragweed

== D ==
- Jesse Dayton
- The Deep Dark Woods
- The Devil Makes Three
- Tanya Donelly
- Divorce (band)
- Drive-By Truckers

== E ==
- Steve Earle
- Tim Easton
- Carrie Elkin
- Elliott Brood
- Alejandro Escovedo

== F ==
- Jay Farrar
- Fifth on the Floor
- Rosie Flores
- Paula Frazer
- Freakwater
- Kinky Friedman
- Robbie Fulks

== G ==
- Mary Gauthier
- Giant Sand
- Golden Smog
- The Gourds
- Green on Red
- Grievous Angels
- Patty Griffin
- Nanci Griffith
- The Guthries
- Sarah Lee Guthrie

== H ==
- Hacienda Brothers
- Wayne Hancock
- The Handsome Family
- Thomas Hansen (aka Saint Thomas)
- Hazeldine
- Patterson Hood

== I ==
- I See Hawks In L.A.
- Jason Isbell

== J ==
- The Jayhawks
- Jolene

== L ==
- Legendary Shack Shakers
- MJ Lenderman
- Jenny Lewis
- Graham Lindsey
- The Little Willies
- Lucero
- Lydia Loveless
- Lyle Lovett

== M ==
- Carolyn Mark
- The Mastersons
- The Mavericks
- Chris Mills
- Milton Mapes
- Elizabeth Mitchell
- Jason Molina
- John Moreland
- James McMurtry

== N ==
- Nick 13

== O ==
- Old 97's
- Old Crow Medicine Show
- Mark Olson
- Lindi Ortega

== P ==
- Gram Parsons
- Joe Pernice
- Pinegrove
- Purple Mountains

== R ==
- India Ramey
- Rattlesnake Gunfight
- Reckless Kelly
- Richmond Fontaine
- Jason Ringenberg
- Bruce Robison
- Carrie Rodriguez
- Roman Candle
- Justin Rutledge
- Matthew Ryan

== S ==
- Scud Mountain Boys
- Silver Jews
- Son Volt
- Souled American
- Split Lip Rayfield
- Jesse Sykes
- Jesse Sykes & the Sweet Hereafter

== T ==
- Tarnation
- Billy Bob Thornton
- Three O'Clock Train
- Tres Chicas
- Jeff Tweedy
- Two Cow Garage

== U ==
- Ugly Casanova
- Uncle Tupelo
- Suzie Ungerleider (aka Oh Susanna)

== V ==
- Townes Van Zandt

== W ==
- The Waco Brothers
- Water Liars
- Waxahatchee
- Wednesday
- Gillian Welch
- Whiskeytown
- Whispertown 2000
- Wilco
- Lucinda Williams
- Kelly Willis

== Y ==
- Dwight Yoakam
