= Strangers Almanac =

Studio album by Whiskeytown
- Released: July 29, 1997
- Recorded: 1996–1997
- Studios: Woodland (Nashville); Ocean Way (Hollywood)
- Genre: Alternative country
- Length: 51:40
- Language: English
- Labels: Geffen, Outpost, Moodfood
- Producer: Jim Scott

Whiskeytown chronology
In Your Wildest Dreams (1997)	Strangers Almanac (1997)	Pneumonia (2001)

Singles from Strangers Almanac
- 1. "16 Days" Released: July 1997; 2. "Yesterday's News" Released: February 1998

Professional ratings
Review scores
Source	Rating
AllMusic	3.5/5 stars
The Austin Chronicle	4/5 stars
Encyclopedia of Popular Music	4/5 stars
Entertainment Weekly	B+
The Guardian	3/5 stars
Pitchfork	7.8/10
Record Collector	5/5 stars
Rolling Stone	3/5 stars
Spin	3.5/5 stars
Uncut	5/5 stars

Strangers Almanac is the second studio album by American alternative country band Whiskeytown, released on July 29, 1997, on Outpost and Geffen Records. The album was reissued as a deluxe edition with bonus tracks and an additional disc of previously unreleased material on March 4, 2008.

== Background and production ==
Throughout 1996, Whiskeytown recorded new material in Chapel Hill and Durham, North Carolina. Two separate recording sessions – dubbed the "Barn's On Fire" sessions and the "Baseball Park" sessions – produced several songs that were later re-recorded for Strangers Almanac. And while praising everyone involved in making Strangers, principal songwriter Ryan Adams once remarked in an interview that he preferred these earlier songs to the final album. Tracks from these sessions would later be released on the reissues of Faithless Street and Strangers Almanac.

The road to making Strangers was a rocky one – in late 1996, bassist Steve Grothman and drummer Skillet Gilmore left the band on the same day, suddenly placing the future of Whiskeytown in doubt. It was then that violinist Caitlin Cary also considered leaving the band, while Adams toyed with the idea of signing as a solo artist with A&M Records. But in the end, the remaining band members soldiered on and, in February 1997, Adams, Cary, and guitarist Phil Wandscher traveled to Woodland Studios in Nashville to record their major label debut. Drummer Steve Terry and bassist Jeff Rice were also added to the lineup. Producer Jim Scott was selected due to his previous work on Tom Petty's Wildflowers album.

The sessions featured plenty of give-and-take between the young, scrappy band and the older, more-polished producer. Said Adams later: "He [Jim Scott] wanted to make something flow. He wanted to make our record work, whereas we wanted our record to get damaged." And for his part, Scott points to a particularly raw-sounding guitar part in the song "Everything I Do" and says, "I listen to that and go, oh my God, we should've redone that guitar because it just is a little rough on such a beautiful song. But that's maybe what they liked about it; they were like, 'No, that's cool'... Maybe that was the bruise on the apple that they were looking for."

The first notes heard on the album – Adams picking out a slow acoustic guitar line at the beginning of "Inn Town" – were played using an Alvarez guitar purchased for $100 at a Nashville pawn shop. Adams had arrived in Nashville without a guitar because of an unfortunate mishap: on the day they were leaving for Nashville, the band met in a parking lot to load their gear into a van for the trip. After loading their gear, everyone hopped in the van and drove off. It was only later that they realized they'd left Adams's guitars behind, still sitting in the parking lot. The title of the album's opening track is a reference to fellow North Carolinian/Superchunk frontman Mac McCaughan and his band Wwax, who released a song with the same title.

The song "Excuse Me While I Break My Own Heart Tonight" features Alejandro Escovedo on vocals. The band had previously covered Escovedo's True Believers song "The Rain Won't Help You When It's Over", which is featured on Disc 2 of the album's 2008 reissue.

The understated piano accents on "Avenues" were played by Adams. Producer Scott believes that this was the first time that the young songwriter had ever played piano on a recording.

About the song "Losering", Adams says: "I love 'Losering' because I think it makes a beautiful statement with only about six words. I coulda put more extremely well-written, musically perfect songs on the record but decided not to because I was proud of the fact that there was finally some experimenting going on in the band. And 'Losering' was one of them – 'Losering' was originally just about a six or seven-bar little hymn that I was writing, like Sun Ra or somebody might do – like A Love Supreme, you know, where they just mumble that in succession at the end of that Coltrane record? I kinda wanted to do something like that but maybe with an influence from The Byrds, you know. And I was really proud of that; I really thought that was amazing, so I love listening to it."

After a month of recording at Woodland Studios, the band finished recording and mixing at Ocean Way Studios in Los Angeles. Thirty-six songs were recorded for the album, of which thirteen made the final cut.

== Strangers Almanac Tour (1997–98) ==
In a 2008 interview with Independent Weekly, Adams admitted that the Strangers sessions were a very unhappy time for him personally. Depression, substance abuse, and a general dissatisfaction with the band plagued his time in Nashville. In spite of this, Whiskeytown embarked on a grueling and turbulent tour that stretched out over the next 19 months. The band first appeared as part of the "No Depression Tour" with fellow alt-country acts Old 97's, Hazeldine, and The Picketts in the Spring of 1997.

After Strangers Almanac was released on July 29, another round of touring ensued. This leg of the tour, dubbed the "RV Tour", found the band traveling between gigs in an RV. On the whiskeytownavenues message board, tour manager Thomas O'Keefe called the tour "a 2-month trek in the US that still causes mental illness in those that were there." One particular show at the Iota Club in Arlington, Virginia, found guitarist Phil Wandscher sitting above the stage for the entire performance, playing his guitar and occasionally throwing beer bottles down at singer Ryan Adams. At another show in Lansing, MI, a fan threw tomatoes at the band's crew following an abbreviated set by the band.

On September 10, the band recorded a live in-studio performance for the KCRW radio program "Brave New World", which was later released on the 2008 deluxe edition of Strangers.

Following a contentious September 25 show at The Hurricane in Kansas City, the band splintered. Ryan Adams and Caitlin Cary played the remaining dates of the tour as an acoustic duo. Wandscher, an original member of the band, would never play or record with Whiskeytown again.

Wandscher's work on the Strangers Almanac album would later secure a record deal for his next band – thanks to a recommendation by Death Cab for Cutie's Chris Walla, who's a big fan of the album.

Less than a month later, Whiskeytown had a new touring lineup and hit the road again. Joining Adams and Cary were ex-Firehose guitarist Ed Crawford, bassist Jenni Snyder, multi-instrumentalist Mike Daly, and the band's original drummer Skillet Gilmore. In January 1998, this lineup taped a live performance for Austin City Limits. They also performed on a number of radio programs, including Mountain Stage, Acoustic Cafe, Modern Rock Live, and KMTT's Music Lounge.

In late April, the band embarked on their very first European tour, but without Crawford or Snyder. The Strangers tour continued in June as the band opened for John Fogerty, again with a new lineup of sidemen for Adams and Cary, including Brad Rice and Danny Kurtz from The Backsliders.

Whiskeytown's ever-evolving lineup would prompt the band to poke fun at itself by selling T-shirts at shows that read: "I Played In Whiskeytown And All I Got Was This Lousy Goddamn T-Shirt!"

In September, having now been on the road since March of the previous year, the band played another scandalous show – this time at the Fillmore Auditorium in San Francisco. At the end of the show, after experiencing sound problems, a lukewarm crowd, and being told he could not smoke on stage, an upset Adams smashed his mic stand and tossed the monitors off the stage. He then got into an altercation with the venue's security, and was finally dragged away by band member Daly.

By the final show of the tour in October 1998, the band was playing almost an entire set of brand-new, unreleased music, with barely any songs from Strangers Almanac – the very album which had launched the tour nearly two years before.

It would prove to be Whiskeytown's final tour to date.

== Track listing ==
=== Original release ===
All tracks written by Ryan Adams, except where noted.

1. "Inn Town" – 5:51 (Adams, Wandscher)
2. "Excuse Me While I Break My Own Heart Tonight" – 3:14
3. "Yesterday's News" – 2:49 (Adams, Wandscher)
4. "16 Days" – 3:54
5. "Everything I Do" – 4:31 (Adams, Wandscher)
6. "Houses on the Hill" – 2:38 (Adams, Cary)
7. "Turn Around" – 5:16 (Adams, Cary)
8. "Dancing with the Women at the Bar" – 4:38
9. "Waiting to Derail" – 3:54
10. "Avenues" – 2:31
11. "Losering" – 4:00
12. "Somebody Remembers the Rose" – 2:30 (Adams, Wandscher)
13. "Not Home Anymore" – 5:54

=== Deluxe edition ===
All tracks written by Ryan Adams, except where noted.

Disc one

1. "Inn Town" – 5:51
2. "Excuse Me While I Break My Own Heart Tonight" – 3:14
3. "Yesterday's News" – 2:49
4. "16 Days" – 3:54
5. "Everything I Do" – 4:31
6. "Houses on the Hill" – 2:38
7. "Turn Around" – 5:16
8. "Dancing with the Women at the Bar" – 4:38
9. "Waiting to Derail" – 3:54
10. "Avenues" – 2:31
11. "Losering" – 4:00
12. "Somebody Remembers the Rose" – 2:30
13. "Not Home Anymore" – 5:54
14. "Houses on the Hill" (Live) (bonus track) – 3:42
15. "Nurse with the Pills" (Live) (bonus track) – 4:40
16. "I Don't Care What You Think About Me" (Live) (bonus track) – 3:18
17. "Somebody Remembers the Rose" (Live) (bonus track) – 2:33
18. "Turn Around" (Live) (bonus track) – 4:26
- Tracks 14–18 are previously unreleased live in the studio recordings. They were originally broadcast 9/10/97 on "Brave New World", KCRW-FM Radio, Santa Monica, CA
- Tracks 15 & 16 written by Ryan Adams

Disc two

1. "Indian Gown" – 4:46 (Adams/Wandscher)
2. "16 Days" (Demo) – 3:13
3. "Somebody Remembers the Rose" (Demo) – 2:45 (Adams/Wandscher)
4. "Avenues" (Demo) – 3:34
5. "Excuse Me While I Break My Own Heart Tonight" (Demo) – 2:43
6. "Houses on the Hill" (Early Version) – 2:25 (Adams/Cary)
7. "My Heart Is Broken" – 3:04 (Adams/Cary)
8. "I Still Miss Someone" (Demo) – 2:24 (Johnny Cash/Roy Cash Jr.)
9. "Kiss and Make-Up" – 3:31
10. "Barn's on Fire" – 1:43
11. "Dancing with the Women at the Bar" (Early Version) – 4:28
12. "Dreams" – 5:49 (Stevie Nicks)
13. "Breathe" – 4:07
14. "Wither, I'm a Flower" (from the Hope Floats soundtrack) – 4:53
15. "Luxury Liner" – 2:40 (Gram Parsons)
16. "Theme for a Trucker" (from The End of Violence soundtrack) – 4:29
17. "Streets of Sirens" – 3:44
18. "Turn Around" (Early Version) – 4:02 (Adams/Cary)
19. "10 Seconds Till the End of the World" – 4:15 (Adams/Wandscher)
20. "Ticket Time" – 3:54 (Adams/Wandscher)
21. "The Rain Won't Help You When It's Over" – 4:34 (Alejandro Escovedo)
- Tracks 1, 6, 7, 10–13, 15, 17, and 19–21: the "Barn's on Fire" sessions.
- Tracks 2, 3, and 5: the "Baseball Park" sessions.
- All songs are previously unreleased, except for tracks 14 and 16.

== Personnel ==
=== Musicians ===
- Ryan Adams – acoustic and electric guitars, vocals, banjo, piano, percussion
- Phil Wandscher – electric guitar, vocals, organ, percussion
- Caitlin Cary – violin, vocals
- Steven Terry – drums, vocals, percussion
- Jeff Rice – bass guitar

=== Additional musicians ===
- Alejandro Escovedo – vocals
- John Ginty – piano, wurlitzer electric piano, Hammond b3 organ, church keys
- Greg Leisz – pedal steel guitar, lap steel guitar, mandolin
- Curt Bisquera – percussion
- Bill Ladd – pedal steel guitar
- Rick Latina – pedal steel guitar
- Dan Navarro – trumpet
- Crecencio Gonzalez – trombone
- Jim Goodwin – alto saxophone
- Jim Scott – percussion

=== Production ===
- Produced, engineered and mixed by Jim Scott
- Recorded at Woodland studios, Nashville and Ocean Way studios, Hollywood
- Mixed at Ocean Way Studios, Hollywood
- Mastered by Stephen Marcussen at Precision Mastering, Los Angeles.
