= Forever Valentine =

Album

Studio album by Whiskeytown
- Released: Unreleased
- Recorded: Late 1997, Scores/Slackmates, Raleigh, NC, and Modern Recording Service, Chapel Hill, NC
- Genre: Alternative country
- Length: 43:33
- Producer: Chris Stamey

Forever Valentine is an unreleased studio album by alternative country band Whiskeytown, recorded between their Strangers Almanac and Pneumonia albums. The album, produced by Chris Stamey, is notable for featuring Ben Folds on piano and ex-Firehose member Ed Crawford on guitar.

The band quickly recorded the album without their record label knowing about it, since it fell outside of the terms of their contract at that time. In an interview with the Ryan Adams-Whiskeytown fan website AnsweringBell.com, Whiskeytown drummer Skillet Gilmore confirmed this.

Music journalist David Menconi calls Forever Valentine "an interesting yet unfocused record consisting of eleven quite good but quite different songs", citing it as "one of the leading entries in Ryan's catalog of 'lost' albums"; while Steven Hyden of Grantland says that it "ranks with Adams’s best Whiskeytown work".

== Track listing ==
No.	Title	Writer(s)	Length
1.	"Anyone But Me (Dial Tone)"		4:18
2.	"Don't Wanna Know Why"	Adams/Daly/Cary	4:03
3.	"Easy Hearts"	Adams/Cary	4:01
4.	"Sittin' Around"		4:06
5.	"Rays of Burning Light (Rays of Light)"		4:50
6.	"Ghost Without Memory"		4:55
7.	"Runnin' Out of Road"		3:35
8.	"Can't Take A Lover (Talkin' In My Sleep)"		2:19
9.	"I Don't Care What You Think About Me"	Adams	4:26
10.	"Crazy Lonesome (A Memory Away)"		2:20
11.	"Caroline"		4:10

== Personnel and production credits ==
- Ryan Adams – guitar, vocals
- Caitlin Cary – violin, vocals
- Ed Crawford – guitar
- Mike Daly – various instruments
- Ben Folds – piano
- Skillet Gilmore – drums
- Chris Stamey – bass guitar, producer
- Thomas O'Keefe – project manager
- Recorded at Scores/Slackmates, Raleigh, NC, and Modern Recording Service, Chapel Hill, NC
