= Don't Be Sad =

Single by Whiskeytown

from the album Pneumonia
- Released: 2001
- Genre: Alternative country
- Label: Lost Highway
- Songwriter: Ryan Adams/Mike Daly/James Iha
- Producer: Ethan Johns

Whiskeytown singles chronology
| "Car Songs" (1998) | "Don't Be Sad" (2001) | "San Antone" / "The Great Divide (Whiskeytown song" (2009) |

"Don't Be Sad" is a song by alt-country band Whiskeytown, from their album, Pneumonia. It was co-written by Ryan Adams, Mike Daly, and James Iha (Smashing Pumpkins), and issued as a single to radio in 2001.

Ryan Adams says this about the track: "I think there's a duality in that song. I think on one hand, it's saying, 'Hang on, we'll get through this,' but deep down, we know we're not going to get through it at all. I don't know. Damn, that song just kinda says it all, doesn't it?"

== Track listing ==
| No. | Title | Writer(s) | Length |
|---|---|---|---|
| 1. | "Don't Be Sad" | Adams/Daly/Iha | 3:21 |

== Credits ==
=== Musicians ===
- Ryan Adams — Guitars, vocals, piano & harmonica
- Caitlin Cary — Fiddle & backing vocals
- Mike Daly — Guitars, pedal steel, lap steel, dulcimer, mandocello, mandolin, keyboards & backing vocals
- Brad Rice — Guitars
- Jennifer Condos — Bass
- Mike Santoro — Bass
- Richard Causon — Keyboards
- James Iha - Guitars & Backing vocals
- Tommy Stinson — Guitar & dobro
- James Jumbo Aumonier — Celeste
- Ethan Johns — Drums, bass, mandolin, mandocello, keyboards, percussion & guitars

=== Production credits ===
- Produced by Ethan Johns
- Engineered by Trina Shoemaker
- Mixed & engineered by Ethan Johns
- Recorded at Dreamland Studios & House Of Blues Studios
- Mixed at The Sound Factory
- Mastered by Doug Sax & Robert Hadley at the Mastering Lab, Hollywood, CA
