= Rural Free Delivery (EP) =

EP by Whiskeytown
- Released: May 6, 1997
- Recorded: 1995
- Genre: Alternative country, country rock
- Length: 24:05
- Label: Mood Food

Whiskeytown chronology
Theme for a Trucker (1997)	Rural Free Delivery (1997)	In Your Wildest Dreams (1997)

Rural Free Delivery is an EP by the alternative country band Whiskeytown, released by Mood Food Records in 1997. It compiles the four songs from the band's debut EP Angels recorded in a single day, with four additional outtakes from the same session. The music was recorded in 1995, just a few months after Whiskeytown formed, but it was released only two years later. This was part of a deal worked out with Mood Food to release the band from their current contract so that they could sign with Outpost Recordings.

The EP contains a hidden track, an alternate mix of "Nervous Breakdown", at the beginning of the CD. To access it, listeners must scan backwards 3:15 from the beginning of the first listed track.

== Track listing ==
All tracks are written by Ryan Adams, Phil Wandscher, Eric Gilmore, Steve Grothman, and Caitlin Cary unless stated otherwise.

No.	Title	Writer(s)	Length
1.	"Take Your Guns to Town"		2:30
2.	"Nervous Breakdown"	Greg Ginn	2:20
3.	"Tennessee Square"	Ryan Adams	3:03
4.	"Captain Smith"		2:11
5.	"Macon, Georgia County Line"		2:30
6.	"Pawnshop Ain't No Place for a Wedding Ring"		4:33
7.	"Oklahoma"		2:56
8.	"Angels Are Messengers from God"	Ryan Adams, Caitlin Cary	4:06

== Personnel and production credits ==
- Ryan Adams — guitar, vocals
- Caitlin Cary — violin, vocals
- Skillet Gilmore — drums
- Steve Grothman — bass
- Phil Wandscher — guitar, harmonica, vocals
- Jennifer Thomas — design
- Kurt Underhill, Toby Roan — photos
- Recorded at Sonic Wave Studios, Raleigh, NC by Greg Elkins
- Mixed at Sonic Wave Studios, Raleigh, NC by Mark Cimerro & Kurt Underhill
- Mastered at The Kitchen, Chapel Hill, NC by Brent Lambert
