= In Your Wildest Dreams (EP) =

EP by Whiskeytown
- Released: July 29, 1997
- Genre: Alternative country
- Length: 18:19

Whiskeytown chronology
Rural Free Delivery (1997)	In Your Wildest Dreams (1997)	Strangers Almanac (1997)

In Your Wildest Dreams is the fourth and final EP by the alternative country band Whiskeytown, released as a promotional item on July 29, 1997.

"The Rain Won't Help You When It's Over" is a True Believers cover. The song's composer, Alejandro Escovedo, had this to say about the song: “I’ve always held that song very dear because it’s the first one I ever wrote and it was such a staple of the [True] Believers’ set and sound... ‘Rain’ holds a special place for me, but I always felt the Believers never did a great recording of that tune. So I was happy to hear Whiskeytown did it. I love their version of it. Even though Ryan forgot the second verse.”

== Track listing ==
No.	Title	Writer(s)	Length
1.	"Ticket Time"	Adams	3:53
2.	"The Rain Won't Help You When It's Over"	Escovedo	4:40
3.	"Factory Girl"	Adams/Wandscher	4:53
4.	"Wither, I'm A Flower"	Adams	4:53

== Personnel and production credits ==
- Ryan Adams — acoustic & electric guitars, singing, banjo, piano, percussion
- Phil Wandscher — electric guitar, singing, organ, percussion
- Caitlin Cary — violin, singing
- Steve Terry — drums, singing, percussion
- Jeff Rice — the bass guitar
- 1 & 4 produced, engineered, and mixed by Jim Scott
- 2 & 3 produced by Chris Stamey, recorded by Tim Harper
