= Like, Love, Lust and the Open Halls of the Soul =

Like Love, Lust and the Open Halls of the Soul

Studio album by Jesse Sykes and the Sweet Hereafter
- Released: February 6, 2007
- Recorded: Seattle, Washington, 2006.
- Genres: Psychedelic folk, alternative country
- Length: 52:49
- Labels: Barsuk Records; Southern Lord Records (SUNN89)
- Producers: Martin Feveyear, Tucker Martine

Jesse Sykes and the Sweet Hereafter chronology
Oh, My Girl (2004)	Like Love, Lust and the Open Halls of the Soul (2007)	Marble Son (2011)

Professional ratings
Review scores
Source	Rating
AllMusic	4/5 stars
American Songwriter	Positive
PopMatters	(8/10)
Hybrid Magazine	Positive
Memphis Flyer	A−
kevchino	(9/10)
Pure Music	Positive
NPR	Positive

Like Love, Lust and the Open Halls of the Soul is the third album by Seattle band Jesse Sykes and the Sweet Hereafter. It was released on February 6, 2007 through Barsuk Records.

Sykes said the structure of the album's songs were often not what listeners initially expected. "Essentially, what we're doing is kind of folk music, but the structures are complex," she said. "It's like country/folk/rock with a psychedelic bent."

She said the album's elaborate title was inspired by a heavily tattooed bar patron Sykes saw outside a club in Reno: "I met this extraordinary guy. He was covered in tattoos, and he had three scripted L's tattooed on his wrist," she recalled. "When I asked him what it meant, he said, 'Like, Love, Lust, baby'—and he pointed at his wife and said, 'That's all that matters. You got that, and you got everything'." Sykes said "Aftermath" drew its inspiration from Swedish singer-songwriter Nicolai Dunger, who provides backup vocals on another song, "Station Grey". "It was magical," she said. "He was just sitting on my couch and playing a bunch of his songs, some of my favorites. He has kind of a strange, complicated style. I was so inspired, and I think 'Aftermath' came out of trying to incorporate that experience."

Four of the album's songs were co-written with Sweet Hereafter guitarist Phil Wandscher, formerly of Whiskeytown. Sykes said: "Phil's playing kind of blows me away, and in my writing process, now, it turns out that the songs have a lot more space for him to do things, important things. They're not guitar solos for the sake of guitar solos. They're actually complex melodic structures that are almost classical at times. There are a lot of counterpoints and layering in the records. Nothing unnecessary; everything seems to be reacting to something else."

The album was initially recorded with longtime producer Tucker Martine, but remixed by English-born, Seattle-based producer Martin Feveyear after concerns over the sound.

== Track listing ==
All words and music by Jesse Sykes except where noted.

No.	Title	Writer(s)	Length
1.	"Eisenhower Moon"		3:33
2.	"LLL"		3:57
3.	"You Might Walk Away"		2:49
4.	"Air Is Thin"	Sykes, Wandscher	4:20
5.	"Spectral Beings"		4:13
6.	"How Will We Know"	Sykes, Wandscher	5:24
7.	"Hard Not to Believe"		4:36
8.	"Aftermath"		3:27
9.	"Station Grey"		5:04
10.	"I Like The Sound"	Sykes, Wandscher	3:51
11.	"Morning It Comes"	Sykes, Wandscher	6:08
12.	"Open Halls of the Soul"		5:26
Total length:			52:48

== Personnel ==
- Jesse Sykes – vocals, acoustic guitar
- Phil Wandscher – guitars, harmonica, lapsteel, keyboards, vocals
- Anne Marie Ruljancich – viola, vocals
- Bill Herzog – electric and upright bass, vocals
- Eric Eagle – drums, percussion

Additional musicians:

- Micah Hulscher – piano, harmonium
- Steve Moore – keyboards, organ
- Eyvind Kang – viola, violin
- Wayne Horvitz – Hammond B3
- Gretchen Yanover – cello
- Dave Carter – trumpet
- Craig Flory – saxophone
- Josiah Boothby – french horn
- Ben O'Shea – trombone
- Billy Joe Huel – trumpet
- Ron Weinstein – Hammond B3
- Tucker Martine – percussion
- Nicolai Dunger – backup vocals ("Air is Thin", "Station Grey")
