= Angels E.P. =

EP by Whiskeytown
- Released: May 1995
- Genre: Alternative country
- Label: Mood Food

Whiskeytown chronology
Angels E.P. (1995)	Faithless Street (1995)

Angels E.P. is the debut release from North Carolina–based band Whiskeytown. The band recorded the entire EP in a single day with producer Greg Elkins just a couple of months after they had formed. Originally released as a 7" vinyl EP in 1995 by Mood Food Records, the label re-released it two years later as Rural Free Delivery, which added four outtakes from the same recording session.

== Track listing ==
All tracks are written by Ryan Adams unless otherwise stated.

No.	Title	Writer(s)	Length
1.	"Angels are Messengers From God"	Ryan Adams, Caitlin Cary
2.	"Captain Smith"
3.	"Tennessee Square"
4.	"Take Your Guns"

== Band and production credits ==
- Ryan Adams – guitar and vocals
- Caitlin Cary – fiddle and vocals
- Skillet Gilmore – drums
- Steve Grothmann – bass
- Phil Wandscher – guitar and vocals
- Greg Elkins – recording and engineering
