= Yesterday's News =

Single by Whiskeytown

from the album Strangers Almanac
- A-side: "Yesterday's News" (Radio Version)
- B-side: "Yesterday's News" (LP Version)
- Released: February 1998
- Recorded: 1997
- Genre: Alternative country
- Label: Outpost Recordings
- Songwriter: Ryan Adams/Phil Wandscher
- Producer: Jim Scott

Whiskeytown singles chronology
"16 Days" (1997)	"Yesterday's News" (1998)	"Car Songs" (1998)

"Yesterday's News" is a song by alternative country band Whiskeytown, co-written by Ryan Adams and Phil Wandscher. It first appeared on Whiskeytown's Strangers Almanac album, and was released in 1998 as a CD single. It reached #27 on the Heritage Rock chart.

An earlier version of the song - recorded during the band's "Baseball Park" sessions - was released on the 1998 reissue of the band's first album Faithless Street. Ryan Adams calls this "the definitive version. It sounds younger and freer than the one on Strangers Almanac, a little bit faster and louder. That was our Big Star phase. I played through a Vox amp at [producer] Chris Stamey’s request. Phil put a space-echo on the solo, and he talks underneath me in the choruses. The singing is better on the original... I had just written the song when we recorded it with Chris [Stamey] for the Baseball Park Sessions. The person it was about was still fresh in my mind."

The lyrics of the song mention "The Comet", i.e., The Comet Lounge, a favorite Raleigh, NC, hangout for the band. The bar has since closed.

== Track listing ==
No.	Title	Writer(s)	Length
1.	"Yesterday's News (Radio Version)"	Adams/Wandscher	3:05
2.	"Yesterday's News (LP Version)"	Adams/Wandscher	2:49

== Personnel & Production Credits ==
- Ryan Adams — acoustic & electric guitars, singing, banjo, piano, percussion
- Phil Wandscher — electric guitar, singing, organ, percussion
- Caitlin Cary — violin, singing
- Steven Terry — drums, singing, percussion
- Jeff Rice — bass guitar
- Produced, engineered, and mixed by Jim Scott
