= 16 Days (song) =

Single by Whiskeytown

from the album Strangers Almanac
- B-side: "The Rain Won't Help You When It's Over"; "Wither, I'm a Flower"
- Released: July 1997
- Recorded: 1997
- Genre: Alternative country
- Label: Outpost Recordings
- Songwriter(s): Ryan Adams
- Producer(s): Jim Scott

Whiskeytown singles chronology
| "16 Days" (1997) | "Yesterday's News" (1998) |

"16 Days" is a song by alternative country band Whiskeytown and written by Ryan Adams. It first appeared on Whiskeytown's Strangers Almanac album in 1997, and was released that same year as a CD single. An earlier version of the song – recorded during the band's "Baseball Park" sessions – was released on the 1998 reissue of the band's first album Faithless Street. And an alternate, acoustic version of the song – also recorded during the "Baseball Park" sessions – was released on the 2008 deluxe edition of Strangers Almanac.

According to Ryan Adams, the song was released as a single and was getting significant radio airplay until, in a fit of anger, he dared a powerful West Coast radio programmer to take the song off the air. The programmer obliged, and the song soon disappeared from radio playlists.

== Cover versions ==
The song has been covered by The Clarks on their album Songs in G.

The song has also been covered by Wade Bowen as a hidden track on his Blue Light Live album

== Track listing ==
| No. | Title | Writer(s) | Length |
|---|---|---|---|
| 1. | "16 Days" | Ryan Adams | 3:55 |
| 2. | "The Rain Won't Help You When It's Over" | Alejandro Escovedo | 4:40 |
| 3. | "Wither, I'm A Flower" | Ryan Adams | 4:53 |

== Personnel and production credits ==
- Ryan Adams — acoustic & electric guitars, singing, banjo, piano, percussion
- Phil Wandscher — electric guitar, singing, organ, percussion
- Caitlin Cary — violin, singing
- Steven Terry — drums, singing, percussion
- Jeff Rice — bass guitar
- Produced, engineered, and mixed by Jim Scott
