= The Freightwhaler Sessions =

Extended play by Ryan Adams

EP by Freight Whaler
- Released: Unreleased
- Recorded: 1996
- Genres: Alternative country, country rock
- Length: 20:59

The Freightwhaler Sessions is an unreleased EP by alt-country artist Ryan Adams' side project band Freightwhaler (Freight Whaler), recorded in 1996. At the time, Adams was also a member of Whiskeytown.

After attending a Freight Whaler concert in Raleigh, NC, No Depression writer David Menconi described the band as such: "...imagine an alternate version of the movie Revenge of the Nerds, in which the long-oppressed geeks form a gutsy roots-rock band instead of a cheeseball synth-pop band."

The unreleased EP, which has made the rounds among the file-sharing community, is notable for the song "Bar Lights", which was later re-cut for Pneumonia, Whiskeytown's final album from 2001.

Freight Whaler bassist Chris Laney revealed to AnsweringBell.com that two slower songs - "Sometimes That's Hard To Do" and "Picture Of Jesus On The Dashboard" - were recorded after drummer Skillet Gilmore broke his collarbone and couldn't play drums anymore.

== Track listing ==
No.	Title	Writer(s)	Length
1.	"At the Drive In"		4:22
2.	"Bar Lights"	Ryan Adams	3:23
3.	"The Ghosts Are Out Tonight"		4:39
4.	"Sometimes That's Hard to Do"		5:14
5.	"Picture of Jesus on the Dashboard"		3:19

== Personnel ==
- Ryan Adams – guitar, vocals
- Sloane Doggett – guitar
- Skillet Gilmore – drums
- Chris Laney – bass guitar
- Nicholas Petti – pedal steel
- Recorded by Wes Lachot
