= Theme for a Trucker =

Theme for a Trucker (Double 7")

EP by Whiskeytown
- Released: April 1997
- Recorded: December 1996 at Captured Live, Durham, NC & Modern Recording Service, Chapel Hill, NC
- Genre: Alternative country
- Length: 14:28
- Label: Bloodshot
- Producer: Chris Stamey

Whiskeytown chronology
Faithless Street (1995)	Theme for a Trucker (Double 7") (1997)	Rural Free Delivery (1997)

Theme for a Trucker is a limited edition double 7" vinyl EP by alternative country band Whiskeytown, released by Bloodshot Records in 1997. According to the Bloodshot Records website, only 2000 copies were pressed.

== Music and lyrics ==
The song "Theme for a Trucker" was written by Ryan Adams as a tribute to his friend Jere McIlwean, who had recently died from a heroin overdose. McIlwean (who had also been a bandmate of Adams in his pre-Whiskeytown days) was in a band named Trucker; hence the title of the song. Said Adams of McIlwean: "He’d hate that song so bad; he hated country. Well, he didn’t hate country music, but he didn’t like my version of it, anyway.”

According to a 1997 article in No Depression magazine, Whiskeytown's cover of the True Believers' "The Rain Won't Help You When It's Over" almost made it onto this release. The song's inclusion was even lobbied for by its composer, Alejandro Escovedo.

== Track listing ==
No.	Title	Writer(s)	Length
1.	"Theme for a Trucker"	Adams	4:29
2.	"My Heart Is Broken"	Adams/Cary	3:05
3.	"Houses On The Hill"	Adams/Cary	2:26
4.	"The Strip"	Adams	4:28

== Personnel and production credits ==
- Ryan Adams — guitar, vocals
- Caitlin Cary — violin, vocals
- Phil Wandscher — guitar
- Bill Ladd — pedal steel
- Steve Terry — drums
- Chris Stamey — bass, piano, percussion, producer, mixing, assistant engineer
- Tim Harper — recording, mixing
- Greg Elkins — assistant engineer
- Larry Nix — mastering
- Mixed at Modern Recording Service, Chapel Hill, NC, January 1997
- Mastered at Ardent Studios, Memphis, TN
