= San Antone / The Great Divide =

Single by Whiskeytown

"San Antone" / "The Great Divide"

Single by Whiskeytown
- Released: April 18, 2009
- Recorded: 1996
- Genre: Alternative country
- Length: 7:56
- Label: Geffen Records
- Songwriter(s): see text
- Producer(s): Chris Stamey

"San Antone" / "The Great Divide" is a limited edition 7" vinyl single by American alternative country band Whiskeytown, released by Geffen Records in 2009 for Record Store Day. Both tracks are previously unreleased recordings from the band's 1996 "Baseball Park" sessions.

A live rendition of "The Great Divide" was previously released in 1996 on the compilation CD Power of Tower: Live from the WXDU Lounge.

== Track listing ==
No.	Title	Writer(s)	Length
1.	"San Antone"	David Ryan Adams/Philip Wandscher	4:34
2.	"The Great Divide"	David Ryan Adams	3:22
