= Faithless Street =

Studio album by Whiskeytown
- Released: 1995
- Recorded: July 1995 at the Funny Farm, Apex, NC
- Genre: Alternative country
- Length: 44:36
- Label: Mood Food (Outpost Reissue)
- Producers: Whiskeytown, Chris Stamey (Reissue)

Whiskeytown chronology
Angels (1995)	Faithless Street (1995)	Theme for a Trucker (1997)

Professional ratings
Review scores
Source	Rating
Allmusic	link

Faithless Street is the debut studio album by alternative country band Whiskeytown, released in 1995 on Mood Food Records. The album was reissued by Outpost Recordings in 1998 with several bonus tracks added, and the track "Oklahoma" omitted. Pitchfork Media has called the album "an alt-country touchstone."

== Recording ==
In July 1995, Whiskeytown, with Greg Woods, convened at the Funny Farm in Apex, North Carolina, and began tracking their debut album. According to the band's principal singer-songwriter, Ryan Adams, the band worked quickly and recorded the album in a week and a half. At least one song ("Hard Luck Story") was written in the studio and laid to tape just minutes later. As guitarist Phil Wandscher noted: "Oh yeah, it was always, how much can you do in this little time? It’s all live recording, and then it’s like, 'Overdubs? We don’t have time to overdub, man!' And a lot of times, that worked out better, because you don’t have time to mill around and think about it and then fuck stuff up." Wandscher would be the de facto producer of the sessions, although he's not specifically listed as such in the album credits.

Despite the intensity of the sessions, the band still found time to goof off. Violinist Caitlin Cary remembers getting drunk and riding a horse bareback across a nearby field, while other band members played around with firecrackers - which inspired Adams to later remark: "Out in the parking lot across the street... the Roman candles and Black Cats sounded a lot like I'd hope we'd one day sound - pretty little things all set on fire waiting to get destroyed."

== Whiskeytown moves to a major label ==
Following the release of Faithless Street, the band was the subject of a record label bidding war, which came to a head at Whiskeytown's appearance at the 1996 SXSW Music Festival in Austin, Texas. In what Adams later called a "turning point" for the band, Whiskeytown played to a packed Austin club where even festival badge holders were turned away at the door. During the band's (reportedly sloppy) set, Adams noticed record label representatives in the crowd. But when he tried to avoid the label reps by retreating to the band's van after the show, they followed him there and surrounded the van - some even placing their business cards on the windshield.

At almost every show after the SXSW gig, the band would be approached by someone from a record label. Finally, after playing an industry showcase at Spaceland in Los Angeles, the band signed with Outpost Recordings, a subsidiary of Geffen Records. The contract allowed the young band almost total autonomy.

In a 1997 interview with The Austin Chronicle, Adams commented on the record industry hype surrounding the band following their appearance at SXSW: "After all was said and done, the labels wanting to sign us was probably more detrimental than it was positive." In the months following the SXSW show, the band's bassist, Steve Grothmann, and drummer, Skillet Gilmore, left Whiskeytown. Said Adams: "I think they [Grothmann and Gilmore] felt like it had gone to a place where they weren't comfortable... I know at the time, Skillet didn't like the idea that it had turned into many phone calls, managers, and lawyers. I can see how he felt that way, because we were hardly ever playing."

== Music and lyrics ==
Unlike subsequent Whiskeytown releases, Faithless Street features other band members besides Adams on lead vocals - Wandscher sings two songs ("What May Seem Like Love" and "Top Dollar") and Cary sings one ("Matrimony"). Lyrically, a few of Adams' songs on the album were influenced by his hometown of Jacksonville, North Carolina. "Faithless Street" is the figurative name Adams gave to a low-rent housing area of Raleigh where he once lived.

Peter Buck's guitar playing inspired the opening guitar figure on the album's first track ("Midway Park").

The origin of the song "Lo-Fi Tennessee Mountain Angel (for Kathy Poindexter)" came from a conversation Adams had with Kathy Poindexter, who fronted a local Raleigh punk band named Picasso Trigger. Poindexter recently wrote a song about Dolly Parton called "Lo-Fi Tennessee Mountain Angel." Adams loved the idea of someone writing a punk song about Parton so much that he wrote his song about Poindexter.

Adams' verdict on Faithless Street: "I think it’s a strong youth album. It’s crazy. It loves what it borrows from musically: It tips its hat to Gram Parsons, it tips its hat to the Stones, it’s shaking hands with Uncle Tupelo on some levels." The young songwriter loved the album so much that he talked Geffen Records into buying it from Mood Food Records so that it could be reissued on Outpost three years later.

== Track listing ==
Original version
No.	Title	Writer(s)	Length
1.	"Midway Park"	Ryan Adams, Skillet Gilmore, Phil Wandscher	3:19
2.	"Drank Like a River"	Ryan Adams, Caitlin Cary, Phil Wandscher	2:58
3.	"Too Drunk To Dream"	Ryan Adams, Robert E. Rickers Jr.	2:41
4.	"What May Seem Like Love"	Phil Wandscher	3:45
5.	"Faithless Street"	Ryan Adams, Caitlin Cary	3:55
6.	"Mining Town"	Ryan Adams	2:37
7.	"If He Can't Have You"	Ryan Adams, Skillet Gilmore	3:50
8.	"Black Arrow, Bleeding Heart"	Ryan Adams	2:21
9.	"Matrimony"	Caitlin Cary, Steve Grothmann	3:48
10.	"Hard Luck Story"	Ryan Adams	2:04
11.	"Top Dollar"	Phil Wandscher	2:38
12.	"Oklahoma"	Ryan Adams, Phil Wandscher, Eric Gilmore, Steve Grothman, Caitlin Cary	10:46
13.	"Revenge" (hidden track, begins 5:14 after "Oklahoma")	Ryan Adams, Phil Wandscher

Reissued version
No.	Title	Writer(s)	Length
1.	"Midway Park"	Ryan Adams, Skillet Gilmore, Phil Wandscher	3:24
2.	"Drank Like a River"	Ryan Adams, Caitlin Cary, Phil Wandscher	2:57
3.	"Too Drunk To Dream"	Ryan Adams, Robert E. Rickers Jr.	2:53
4.	"Tennessee Square" (bonus track)	Ryan Adams	2:50
5.	"What May Seem Like Love"	Phil Wandscher	3:47
6.	"Faithless Street"	Ryan Adams, Caitlin Cary	3:55
7.	"Mining Town"	Ryan Adams	2:35
8.	"If He Can't Have You"	Ryan Adams, Skillet Gilmore	3:52
9.	"Black Arrow, Bleeding Heart"	Ryan Adams	2:20
10.	"Matrimony"	Caitlin Cary, Steve Grothmann	3:49
11.	"Excuse Me While I Break My Own Heart Tonight" (bonus track)	Ryan Adams	3:21
12.	"Desperate Ain't Lonely" (bonus track)	Ryan Adams, Caitlin Cary	2:16
13.	"Hard Luck Story"	Ryan Adams	2:07
14.	"Top Dollar"	Phil Wandscher	2:39
15.	"Lo-Fi Tennessee Mountain Angel (for Kathy Poindexter)" (bonus track)	Ryan Adams, Caitlin Cary	4:32
16.	"Revenge"	Ryan Adams, Phil Wandscher	2:43
17.	"Empty Baseball Park" (Baseball Park Sessions)	Ryan Adams	2:55
18.	"Here's To The Rest Of The World" (Baseball Park Sessions)	Ryan Adams	3:08
19.	"16 Days" (Baseball Park Sessions)	Ryan Adams	3:46
20.	"Yesterday's News" (Baseball Park Sessions)	Ryan Adams, Phil Wandscher	2:53
21.	"Factory Girl" (Baseball Park Sessions)	Ryan Adams, Phil Wandscher	4:50

== Personnel and production credits ==
- Ryan Adams — guitar, vocals, producer, photography (trains, back cover)
- Caitlin Cary — violin, vocals, producer, photography (small car)
- Eric "Skillet" Gilmore — drums, producer
- Steve Grothmann — bass, producer
- Phil Wandscher — guitar, vocals, producer
- Bob Ricker — pedal steel ("Faithless Street")
- Chris Stamey — producer, mixing (1998 version)
- Greg Woods — recording
- Tim Harper — mixing (1998 version), recording (Baseball Park Sessions)
- Nicholas Petti — accordion, banjo, pedal steel (Baseball Park Sessions)
- Greg Calbi — mastering
- Chris Billheimer — design
- Melanie Bryan — cover photography, angel photography
- Ray Duffy — band photography
- Faithless Street sessions: recorded at the Funny Farm, Apex, NC
- Baseball Park sessions: recorded at Captured Live!, Durham, NC
- Reissue mixed at Modern Recording, July 1998
- Mastered at Masterdisk
