= Old Skull =

American band

- Origin: Madison, Wisconsin
- Genres: Punk, novelty
- Years active: 1989–1991, 1992–1993, 2005
- Label: Restless
- Past members: J.P. Toulon; Jamie Toulon; Jesse Collins-Davies; Graham Lindsey; Josh Scott; Chris Scott

Old Skull was an American punk rock novelty band that formed in Madison, Wisconsin in the late 1980s. The band was started by ten-year-old J.P. (Jean-Paul) Toulon and his nine-year-old brother, Jamie Toulon, with encouragement from their father Vern Toulon, a longtime member of the Madison punk scene who had spent time in New York City, where he was a guitarist for the industrial band Missing Foundation.

== History ==
=== Formation, Get Outta School (1989) ===
The original lineup featured J.P. on guitar and Jamie on keyboards and came together after the brothers began playing with their father's instruments. After teaching the boys some basic chords, he added a drum machine and the band was formed. Soon after, ten-year-old Jesse Collins-Davies joined the band on drums. Collins-Davies was the stepson of Robin Davies, a member of the Madison-based punk band the Tar Babies, who had previously recorded for SST Records. The group adapted their name from the punk rock band Live Skull, who had stayed at the Toulon house after a show in Madison. After hearing a demo tape the band recorded, Mojo Nixon approached his label, Restless Records, and persuaded them to sign Old Skull to a record deal. In 1989, Restless Records released Old Skull's debut album, Get Outta School. Produced by both Vern Toulon and Robin Davies and engineered by future Garbage member Steve Marker, Get Outta School dealt with such wide-ranging topics as skateboarding, hot dogs, homelessness and the AIDS virus. Due to the non-childlike subject matter in many of the songs, rumors persisted that Vern Toulon was actually ghostwriting much, if not all of the band's material. Critics described the album as hilarious, unlistenable, and torturous, though most agreed that it wasn't all that bad for a group of nine-year-olds. The band also began opening for national acts such as Gwar, The Flaming Lips and Sonic Youth. The novelty of the act drew media attention from television shows like A Current Affair and publications such as Life, People and Newsweek. MTV also gave the band some minor airplay. A music video was released for the song "Homeless".

After the release of Get Outta School, Jesse Collins-Davies left the band and was replaced by twelve-year-old Graham Lindsey. Lindsey performed with the band for two years before the band permanently broke up.

=== New lineup, C.I.A. Drug Fest (1992) ===
In 1992, the Toulon brothers re-formed Old Skull without Lindsey. J.P. Toulon switched to drums, while Jamie, now known as Spike, handled bass and some lead vocals. The Toulons were joined by brothers Josh and Chris Scott on guitars and vocals respectively. This lineup recorded C.I.A. Drug Fest, once again produced by Vern Toulon and released through Restless, and released during that year. This record was considerably more musical than their debut and executed competently with relative cohesion. A music video was released for the song "Pizza Man". A short tour of Japan followed before the act disbanded permanently in 1993.

=== Reunion (2005) ===
In August 2005, the Toulon brothers, now in their mid-20s, reunited Old Skull for a one time show at CBGB's as an opening act for The Exploited, with J.P. returning to vocals and Jamie playing guitar. They were joined onstage by Rik Smart, Mike House and John McClellan of the New York squat punk music scene.

=== Adult life and death (2010-present) ===
J.P. Toulon moved to New York City where he began playing with Planned Collapse, a crust punk band based out of C-Squat, a communal squat located in the East Village of Manhattan. In early 2010, he served jail time in Madison, Wisconsin, and later moved on to a drug rehab facility where he had apparently managed to overcome his drug addiction. J.P. Toulon died on November 13, 2010, his brother Jamie's birthday. He had been living in Minneapolis with his son at the time of his death. While the cause of death has never been made public, Toulon had previously been hospitalized for pancreatitis several times in the months prior to his death. A memorial service was held for Toulon at C-Squat on November 21, 2010.

Jamie Toulon went on to play guitar for the Milwaukee band Doomsday Cauldron. Like his brother, he later moved to New York City and played in a punk band named Apox, which released an album titled Prevalence in 1998. He was also an original member of Star Fucking Hipsters, a side project of Leftöver Crack member Stza. Jamie also joined his brother in Planned Collapse until both brothers left the band. Clay Pigeon, a WFMU DJ who often records conversations with random NYC street people, included a fifteen-minute interview with Jamie on his August 26, 2010, broadcast. In the interview, Jamie revealed that he was living on the streets of New York City and was battling an ongoing drug addiction. Jamie committed suicide in Lynchburg, Virginia on June 10, 2011, seven months after the death of his brother.

Jesse Collins-Davies, using the name DJ Jesse Collins, continued to perform as part of the drum and bass/jungle music scene of Madison. He also has a career as an abstract artist, primarily working in the medium of watercolor on glass.

Graham Lindsey began a solo career as an alternative country artist. He released his first album, Famous Anonymous Wilderness, in 2003. A second album, Hell Under The Skullbones, followed in 2006. In 2008 he released The Mine EP and his third full-length album, We Are All Alone In This Together. A compilation album of rarities titled, Digging Up Birds: A Collection of Rarities & Others was released in 2014. Four of Lindsey's songs were used in the direct-to-DVD film, Fairview St., released in 2009. Lindsey is also a backup musician for The Perreze Farm, a band formed by Lindsey's drummer, Joe Perreze. They released their debut EP, Songs For The Birds, on May 26, 2009.

Vern Toulon, producer and father to the Toulon brothers, went on to appear in the Madison-based documentary film Streets Without Cars before his death on May 31, 2001, at the age of 46. Several reports indicate that he had resorted to panhandling in the years before his death. The boys' parents had divorced early in the band's career. Several years after the divorce, the boys' mother died in a train accident.

== Parody ==
Months before the 2005 reunion, a person named "P.J." called into the radio station WFMU in New Jersey, claiming to be a former member of Old Skull. "P.J." stated that he was re-forming Old Skull as a jazz fusion band without the input of any of the other former members. The call turned out to be an elaborate comedy sketch set up by Tom Scharpling, a supervising producer and writer for the Monk television series, and Superchunk drummer Jon Wurster, for their radio show, The Best Show on WFMU. The sketch also became available on their Hippy Justice CD. Coincidentally, the Hippy Justice CD was released at approximately the same time that the real reunion at CBGB's took place.

== Band members ==
- Jean-Paul "J.P." Toulon – vocals (1989–1991, 2005); guitar (1989–1991); drums (1992–1993); (died 2010)
- Jamie "Spike" Toulon – vocals (1989–1993); keyboards (1989–1991); bass (1992–1993); guitar (2005); (died 2011)
- Jesse Collins-Davies – drums, vocals (1989–1990)
- Graham Lindsey – drums (1990–1991)
- Josh Scott – guitar (1992–1993)
- Chris Scott – vocals (1992–1993)
- Rik Smart – guitar (2005)
- Mike House – bass (2005)
- John McClellan – drums (2005)

Timeline

== Discography ==
Old Skull discography
- Studio albums: 2
- Music videos: 2

Studio albums

- Get Outta School (1989)
- C.I.A. Drug Fest (1992)

Music videos

- "Homeless"
- "Pizza Man"
