= Alt.Country Exposed Roots =

Compilation album by Various Artists
- Released: June 29, 1999
- Label: K-Tel

Professional ratings
Review scores
Source	Rating
Allmusic	4.5/5 stars

Alt.Country Exposed Roots was a 2 disc compilation released in 1999.

== Track listing ==
=== Disc 1 ===
1. Lucinda Williams - "Passionate Kisses" (Lucinda Williams) - 2:39
2. Blue Mountain - "Blue Canoe" (Blue Mountain) - 4:42
3. Gillian Welch - "My Morphine" (David Rawlings/Gillian Welch) - 5:50
4. Whiskeytown - "Nervous Breakdown" (Greg Ginn) - 2:19
5. Golden Smog - "Looking Forward to Seeing You" (Kraig Johnson) - 2:45
6. Jimmie Dale Gilmore - "Dallas" (Jimmie Dale Gilmore) - 2:49
7. Freakwater - "Picture in My Mind" (Freakwater) - 3:34
8. Meat Puppets - "Lost" (Curt Kirkwood) - 3:27
9. The Gourds - "I Like Drinking" (Jimmy Smith) - 3:07
10. BR5-49 - "Bettie Bettie" (Chuck Mead) - 3:51
11. Tangletown - "See Right Through" (Seth Zimmerman) - 4:08
12. Cheri Knight - "Black Eyed Susie" (Cheri Knight) - 4:40

=== Disc 2 ===
1. The Jayhawks - "Waiting for the Sun" (Gary Louris/Mark Olson) - 4:19
2. Kelly Willis - "Talk Like That" (Kelly Willis) - 3:10
3. Steve Earle - "Guitar Town" (Steve Earle) - 2:34
4. Southern Culture on the Skids - "Too Much Pork for Just One Fork" (Rick Miller) - 2:59
5. Johnny Cash - "Folsom Prison Blues" (Johnny Cash) - 2:49
6. The Handsome Family - "Weightless Again" (Brett Sparks/Rennie Sparks) - 3:40
7. Vic Chesnutt - "Gravity of the Situation" (Vic Chesnutt) - 4:09
8. The Honeydogs - "Your Blue Door" (Adam Levy) - 3:23
9. Alejandro Escovedo - "Baby's Got New Plans" (Alejandro Escovedo)- 4:53
10. Marlee MacLeod - "Mata Hari Dress" (Marlee MacLeod) - 3:17
11. Lambchop - "The Saturday Option" (Kurt Wagner) - 4:38
12. Gram Parsons - "In My Hour of Darkness" (Emmylou Harris/Gram Parsons) - 3:44
