= Graham Lindsey =

American singer-songwriter

- Born: Madison, Wisconsin
- Genres: Alternative country, americana, folk rock
- Occupations: Recording and touring artist
- Instruments: drums, vocals, guitar, banjo, harmonica
- Years active: 1990–present
- Labels: Farmageddon Records, Bloodshot Records, Sonic Rendezvous, Spacebar Recordings, Catamount Records

Graham Lindsey is an American singer, songwriter, poet, and musician born and raised in Madison, Wisconsin. He played in several punk bands, including Old Skull, while still in high-school. He released his first solo album in 2003. While retaining the punk attitude and political awareness Lindsey's music had since evolved and exposed his folk and country roots, to create a mix of folk, alternative country, Americana & country noir. He has since released two more albums, one EP and contributed to several compilations. Four of Lindsey's songs were used in the direct-to-DVD film Fairview St., released in 2010. His song "Emma Rumble" was used in the direct-to-DVD film Dunsmore, released in 2004. As of 2014, Lindsey lives in Montana and performs with his wife Tina Lindsey.

== History ==
Lindsey left home at age fourteen and resided in New Orleans, Brooklyn, and Nebraska. After the dissolution of Old Skull, Lindsey became interested in acoustic music, particularly the burgeoning anti-folk movement, and began playing local gigs in Madison. He then dropped music altogether for four years.

== Discography ==
=== Solo albums ===
- Famous Anonymous Wilderness (September 2, 2003)
- Hell Under The Skullbones (August 15, 2006)
- We Are All Alone in This Together (January 20, 2009)
- The Mine EP (January 20, 2009)
- Digging Up Birds: A Collection of Rarities & Others (May 27, 2014)

=== Guest appearances and side projects ===
- The Perreze Farm – Songs for the Birds EP (May 25, 2009)
- Slackeye Slim – El Santo Grial: La Pistola Piadosa (2011)

=== Compilations ===
- Uncut Magazine's Tracks inspired by Bob Dylan (2004)
- Pop Culture Press CD Sampler (2004)
- Hit The Hay – Vol. 2 (2004)
- For A Decade Of Sin: 11 Years Of Bloodshot Records (2006)
- KVCU 1190 AM – 10th Anniversary CD Live Compilation (2008)
- OST Fairview St. (2009)
- Y'all Motherfuckers Need Justice: Free Uriah and Quentin (2010)
- Danielle Colby Presents: The Music of Farmageddon Records (2011)
