= End Time (Freakwater album) =

Studio album by Freakwater
- Released: 1999
- Recorded: January 1999
- Studio: Über
- Genre: Country
- Label: Thrill Jockey
- Producer: Brendan Burke

Freakwater chronology
Springtime (1998)	End Time (1999)	Thinking of You... (2005)

End Time is an album by the American band Freakwater, released in 1999. The band supported the album with a North American tour that included shows with Sally Timms. Freakwater would not record again until 2005's Thinking of You...

== Production ==
The album was produced by Brendan Burke. End Time was the first Freakwater album to employ a drum kit, which was played by the Waco Brothers' Steve Goulding. Eric Haywood, of Son Volt, played pedal steel. A string section was used on some of the tracks. All of the album's songs were written by Catherine Irwin and Janet Beveridge Bean, who allegedly conflicted in the studio. The music of the Carter Family, Lefty Frizzell, and Johnny Cash was a significant influence on the album. "When the Leaves Begin to Fall" is about the war in Bosnia. "Good for Nothing" is about low self-esteem.

== Critical reception ==
Professional ratings
Review scores
Source	Rating
AllMusic	4.5/5 stars
Fort Worth Star-Telegram	4/5 stars
Los Angeles Times	3/4 stars
Pitchfork	5.5/10
The Province	3.5/5 stars
Spin	7/10

Pitchfork wrote that the band "have little more to offer than a pleasant ride through America's backwoods." The Plain Dealer determined that "what separates them from most rockers trying to go country ... is their heartfelt, nonironic approach." Spin concluded that, "though pedal steel and Hammond organ swell like sobs, the group's tenderness can sometimes seem drab, and the album flirts boozily with the old country plague of overproduction." The Los Angeles Times opined that Freakwater's "specialty is dark, troubled ballads."

The Guardian praised the "stiff, serious-minded pastoral songwriting on the rocks, not for the passing hypochondriac or alternative rocker dabbling in neo-country on the side." The Province stated that "Bean and Irwin's rough-hewn harmonies and witty, literate lyrics prove they've been drinking at the same freaky well Gram Parsons and Emmylou Harris dipped into 30 years ago." The San Diego Union-Tribune noted that it is the "desire to celebrate, and extend, musical traditions that gives Freakwater's best songs a haunting dark beauty." The Observer wrote that "there are a couple of dead-slowies too many, but the waltzes, honky-tonk swing and sharp lyrics more than compensate."

== Track listing ==
No.	Title	Length
1.	"Good for Nothing"
2.	"Cloak of Frogs"
3.	"Sick, Sick, Sick"
4.	"Just Like You"
5.	"Cheap Watch"
6.	"My History"
7.	"When the Leaves Begin to Fall"
8.	"Written in Gold"
9.	"Dog Gone Wrong"
10.	"Queen Bee"
11.	"Raised Skin"
12.	"All Life Long"
