= Springtime (Freakwater album) =

Studio album by Freakwater
- Released: 1998
- Genre: Country folk
- Label: Thrill Jockey
- Producer: Brendan Burke, Freakwater

Freakwater chronology
Old Paint (1995)	Springtime (1998)	End Time (1999)

Springtime is an album by the American band Freakwater, released in 1998. It was the band's fifth album. Springtime had sold less than 8,000 copies in the year and a half after its release.

== Production ==
The album was delayed while the band contemplated signing with E-Squared Records, a label founded by Steve Earle. Freakwater decided to return to Thrill Jockey after deciding that Earle wanted too much artistic control over the album; Earle claimed that the band backed away for financial reasons.

The former Wilco multi-instrumentalist Max Johnston played on the album, joining longtime members Janet Beveridge Bean, Catherine Ann Irwin, and Dave Gay. Produced by Brendan Burke and the band, Springtime was the first Freakwater album made up of entirely original songs. "Louisville Lip" is about Muhammad Ali allegedly throwing his Olympic gold medal into the Ohio River after being denied service at a dining establishment.

== Critical reception ==
Professional ratings
Review scores
Source	Rating
AllMusic	4.5/5 stars
Chicago Tribune	4/4 stars
The Encyclopedia of Popular Music	4/5 stars
Los Angeles Times	3.5/5 stars
MusicHound Rock: The Essential Album Guide	4.5/5 stars
The Times	7/10
Uncut	4/5 stars

The Washington Post thought that the "insistence on both an old-time style and old-time themes makes Freakwater a bit self-consciously quaint, but the melding of Bean and Irwin's voice never sounds contrived." The New York Times wrote that the album "connects a superior musicianship with increasingly powerful songs." Rolling Stone determined that "what makes Freakwater come across as more than just a fine bluegrass revival act on Springtime ... is Irwin's songwriting, which approaches Mark Eitzel territory via Hank Williams." The Guardian noted that Bean and Irwin "draw more inspiration from village parsons than Gram Parsons, recanting their punk-rock upbringings in order to interpret the self-made sounds of unfledged, rustic America."

CMJ New Music Monthly opined that "the way Irwin's cracked alto and Bean's clear soprano trade leads and slip into harmonies naturally and comfortably anchors the mood and provides the album's core pleasures." The Los Angeles Times called Springtime "another advance for a group whose brand of Southern Gothic suggests something far more than mere cowpunk affectation." The Times declared that, "though they would deny it, Freakwater are caught in a post-grunge, neo-country revival... What elevates them is a veneration for the music, and their skill in communicating that enthusiasm."

AllMusic deemed the album "a consolidation of Freakwater's status as one of the best—perhaps the best—1990s exponents of the folk-country tradition."

== Track listing ==
No.	Title	Length
1.	"Picture in My Mind"
2.	"Louisville Lip"
3.	"Twisted Wire"
4.	"Washed in the Blood"
5.	"Binding Twine"
6.	"One Big Union"
7.	"Harlan"
8.	"Jesus Year"
9.	"Scamp"
10.	"Lorraine"
11.	"Slowride"
12.	"Heaven"
13.	"Flat Hand"
