= Rattlesnake Gunfight =

- Genres: Alternative country
- Years active: 2010–2013; 2017–present
- Members: Matty Gunfight; Cooper Quinn; Dane Kloos; Jason Mannell; Ben Romalis; James McLaren; Edward Prescott
- Website: www.rattlesnakegunfight.com

Rattlesnake Gunfight is an Australia-based alternative country studio band alternatively fronted by the vocalists Matty Gunfight and Cooper Quinn supported by a group of country musicians with each contributing to the creative process when not working with their own groups.

Rattlesnake Gunfight (RSGF) is best known for its country versions of punk rock songs which were primarily taken from the skate punk subgenre. The band's unique sound blends traditional country music instruments such as banjo, lap slide guitar, pedal steel guitar, fiddle and acoustic guitar with the melodic sound of 1980s-1990s punk rock.

== Releases ==
The band first came to the attention of the skate punk community with the release of a performance of its interpretation of the Alkaline Trio song "Another Innocent Girl" and went on to release three EPs of cover versions over a two-year period, Rattlesnake Gunfight (2011), Live From A Terrace House (2011) and Barn Burner (2012).

The band continued to gain attention from the skate punk community when Lagwagon's vocalist and main songwriter, Joey Cape, sang on the band's version of "Sick" from Lagwagon's 1995 album Hoss.

In 2020, the group released a greatest hits compilation.
