= Bloom, Red & the Ordinary Girl =

Bloom, Red & The Ordinary Girl

Studio album by Tres Chicas
- Released: March 7, 2006
- Label: Yep Roc Records
- Producer: Neil Brockbank, Robert Trehern

Tres Chicas chronology
Sweetwater (2004)	Bloom, Red & The Ordinary Girl (2006)

Professional ratings
Review scores
Source	Rating
Allmusic	4.5/5 stars

Bloom, Red & The Ordinary Girl (the title refers both to the Chicas' nicknames and lyrics on the album) is an alternative country album by Tres Chicas. Supported by Matt Radford and Geraint Watkins and produced by Nick Lowe collaborators Neil Brockbank and Robert Trehern, who also features on drums. Musically, the album tends to stick to easy tempos and sparse arrangements organized around acoustic guitar, keyboards and the Chicas' twining harmonies.

== Track listing ==
1. "Drop Me Down"
2. "Stone Love Song"
3. "My Love"
4. "Shade Trees In Bloom"
5. "Red"
6. "Sway"
7. "Only Broken"
8. "Still I Run"
9. "The Man of The People"
10. "400 Flamingos"
11. "Slip So Easily"
12. "If You Think That It's All Right"

== Personnel ==
- Lynn Blakey – vocals
- Caitlin Cary – vocals
- Tonya Lamm – vocals
- Geraint Watkins – piano, organ
- Matt Radford – upright bass
- Robert "Bobby" Trehern – drums
- Nick Lowe
- Steve Donnelly
- Bob Loveday
- Bill Kirchen
- Produced by Neil Brockbank, Robert Trehern
- Recorded at Goldtop Studios, London
