= Jesse Sykes =

American singer and songwriter (born 1967)

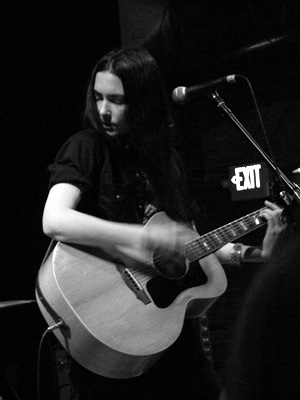
- Jesse Sykes

Background information
- Born: Jessica Ann Solomon; July 17, 1967 (age 59); Mount Kisco, New York
- Genres: Gothic country; country rock; psychedelic folk; psychedelic rock; alternative country
- Occupations: Musician singer-songwriter
- Instrument: Guitar
- Years active: 1999–present
- Labels: Burn Burn Burn Records; Fargo Records; Barsuk Records; Southern Lord; Station Grey
- Members: Jesse Sykes; Phil Wandscher
- Past members: Kevin Warner; Anne Marie Ruljancich; Eric Eagle; Bill Herzog
- Website: jessesykes.com

Jesse Sykes (born Jessica Ann Solomon; July 17, 1967) is an American singer and songwriter, best known for her band Jesse Sykes & the Sweet Hereafter, which was formed in 1999 with Phil Wandscher.

== Early life and education ==
Sykes was born in Mount Kisco, New York, and grew up in Pound Ridge, New York. An obsession with Lynyrd Skynyrd drove her to purchase her first guitar at age 12. Sykes earned a BFA in photography from Rhode Island School of Design.

Sykes moved to Seattle in 1990 after a brief stint in New York City. Sykes says that among her more memorable experiences in the 1990s was meeting songwriter Townes Van Zandt after a Seattle show.

== Career ==
In 1990, Sykes moved to Seattle, Washington, and began playing in bands. Sykes was formerly in the band Hominy with then husband, Jim Sykes, who played guitar. The band released a self-titled album in 1998 on the Ivy label.

In 1998, she met Phil Wandscher, a founder of the alt-country band Whiskeytown. They formed the band Jesse Sykes & the Sweet Hereafter. Members of The Sweet Hereafter included Anne Marie Ruljancich on viola, Bill Herzog on bass, Kevin Warner on drums (on first two albums), and Eric Eagle on drums.

In 1999, Sykes met producer Tucker Martine who recorded and produced the first three albums of The Sweet Hereafter. 2011's Marble Son was produced by Sykes and Wandscher along with engineer Mell Dettmer. There was additional recording and production on both Like, Love, Lust and the Open Halls of the Soul and Marble Son by Martin Feveyear. The band was signed to Barsuk Records in 2003 after Chris Walla of Death Cab For Cutie, also a Barsuk band, heard the debut album Reckless Burning and brought it to the attention of label head Josh Rosenfeld. The same year the band signed with Paris-based label Fargo. Their follow-up album, Oh, My Girl was recognized by music critic Jon Pareles of the New York Times on his end of the year list of "2004 albums that deserve notice before turning the calendar page" and was featured on NPR's All Things Considered. The Seattle Times said "Rolling Stone magazine called Sykes' brooding, emotionally-raw album "quiet marvels of lamentation," and Oh, My Girl made a handful of Top 10 of 2004 lists."

According to the Miami New Times, "At this time the band spent the majority of time on the road, mostly in Europe where The Sweet Hereafter received its earliest accolades." The band played the Roskilde musical festival in Denmark in 2004. In 2005, Conor Oberst, a fan of the band, invited them to tour with his band Bright Eyes. After the release of their third album, Like, Love, Lust and the Open Halls of the Soul, which the Dallas Observer called "her first masterpiece" and CMJ said "a significant step forward for Sykes as a torchbearer of masterful mourning." The band then toured with Sparklehorse. The New York Times reviewed the show at New York City's Webster Hall, saying "in some ways Ms. Sykes could be a female counterpoint to Mr. Linkous" in an article titled "Everything Crumbles Toward Eternities". Sparklehorse was dropped from its label during the tour with the Sweet Hereafter, which Sykes described as a "bomb dropped on the Sparklehorse camp—most critically on Mark Linkous" in an article for the Seattle Weekly she authored describing her experience touring with Mark Linkous. Sadly, Mark Linkous died from a self-inflicted gun shot wound in 2010. The song "Birds Of Passerine" on Marble Son was written by Sykes for Mark Linkous after his death.

In 2008, the band toured with Earth and Black Mountain. In 2009, Sykes and Wandscher wrote and recorded original music for The Seattle Shakespeare Company's performance of The Tempest.

In 2010, Sykes sang at All Tomorrow's Parties in Monticello, New York with the festival's headliner Altar, a collaborative project (as well as album name) between Sunn O))) and Boris. The festival was curated by the film director Jim Jarmusch. That same weekend Sykes also performed in Altar at Brooklyn's Masonic Temple. The show was opened by BXI, the collaborative project with Ian Astbury, front person of The Cult, and Boris, followed by Jesse Sykes and The Sweet Hereafter. On this night a power outage occurred, lasting forty-five minutes. To preserve power, Altar was performed in the dark. On December 10, 2007, Sykes also performed with Altar as part of ATP at The Forum, London.

Sykes' association with Altar came about in 2006 when she had been asked by the members of Sunn O))), to write lyrics and a melody and sing over music they had created with members of Boris, for the upcoming collaborative album. Sykes named the song "The Sinking Belle". Sykes said she drew inspiration for the song from author Joan Didion's memoir The Year of Magical Thinking. Pitchfork called The Sinking Belle "Altars centerpiece and masterpiece".

In 2011, Jesse Sykes and the Sweet Hereafter's fourth album, Marble Son, was released, garnering critical praise from The New York Times, Spin, Consequence of Sound, and others. The Line of Best Fit called it "a triumph, in a word". Spin called it "a sprawling psyche rock vision."

In an interview with Mark Lager on Vinyl Writers, Jesse Sykes discussed her upcoming fifth album. "The new record speaks about what happens in the wake of all the angst and all the noise and fury - so, therefore, a lot of it is very gentle. It feels like the residue left over after you have a good cry or suffer a trauma. The new record is also how my isolation sounds: crickets chirping, ripples on ponds, but then there’s always a sinister reminder. This record may not be as sonically robust as Marble Son – a bit more fragile, perhaps. I would like to think we became more sophisticated after making that record- we learned a lot and I think that evolution is still in the process of unfolding. The new record is maybe going to be a bit more lo-fi, in that we recorded some on 1/2 inch tape… so it has a rawness, but I think it’ll be a nice companion to our earlier work, but will also appeal to those who liked the heavier aspects of Marble Son."

Since 2019, she has been recording and performing with the psychedelic rock supergroup The Third Mind, as their lead vocalist.

In late 2025, Sykes released Forever, I've been Being Born, her first album with The Sweet Hereafter since 2011.

== Personal life ==
Sykes was previously married to musician Jim Sykes. She was in a 10-year relationship with Sweet Hereafter bandmate, Phil Wandscher.

== Discography ==
=== Albums ===
- 2003: Reckless Burning (Barsuk Records)
- 2004: Oh, My Girl (Barsuk Records)

"spellbound music, rapt in fatalism and sorrow."
— -Jon Pareles, The New York Times

- 2007: Like, Love, Lust and the Open Halls of the Soul (Barsuk Records)
- 2011: Marble Son (Station Grey, Fargo)
- 2025: Forever, I've Been Being Born (Southern Lord)

=== EPs ===
- 2008: Gentleness Of Nothing EP (Fargo)
- 2009: The Tempest EP (self-released)

=== Singles ===
- 2002: Split 7' inch, Moon over a troubled town (Jesse Sykes) / Nothing but the blues and People take trips (Steve Turner of Mudhoney) (Burn Burn Burn). Note: the labels are on the wrong sides.

=== Music in film and television ===
- 2004: Song Reckless Burning The WB's Jack & Bobby, season 1, episode 11, Today I am a Man
- 2005: Song Reckless Burning on soundtrack to movie 12 and Holding
- 2006: Song Troubled Soul on soundtrack to the film First Snow
- 2008: Song The Dreaming Dead on HBO's True Blood Strange Love
- 2008: Song Troubled Soul on soundtrack to the Belgium film Eldorado
- 2012: Song Come To Mary on soundtrack to the film Path Of Souls

=== Collaborations ===
- 2006: Writer, vocalist The Sinking Belle, on Sunn O))) / Boris record, Altar
- 2009: Lead vocalist: Outside Love, on Pink Mountaintops' record, Outside Love
- 2009 Lyrics and vocals: Éternelle Idole for a play directed by Gisèle Vienne co-written with Stephen O'Malley
- 2009: Original musical score for Seattle Shakespeare Company's The Tempest co-written with Phil Wandscher
- 2014: Guest vocals with Tomo Nakayama: I Am Waiting (Rolling Stones) for the compilation album, I Saved Latin! A Tribute to Wes Anderson
