= Tres Chicas =

- Tres Chicas in 2006; Photo by Forrest L. Smith, III

Background information
- Origin: Raleigh, North Carolina, U.S.
- Genres: Alternative country
- Years active: 1999–present
- Labels: Yep Roc
- Website: TresChicas.org

Tres Chicas are an alternative country group from Raleigh, North Carolina.

== History ==
Lynn Blakey and Caitlin Cary met in 1997, when Glory Fountain shared a bill with Whiskeytown. Blakey met Tonya Lamm when she attended a Hazeldine show in Chapel Hill, North Carolina, and soon all three were friends.

They first began singing together in 1999; their first performance was an impromptu singalong at an Alejandro Escovedo show in a Raleigh bar. Their name was bestowed upon them by the owner of the bar after the performance.

They occasionally performed live, and recorded some of their material more for historical interest than with the intent of releasing it. Producer Chris Stamey heard the tapes and asked the group to release a full album; the result was Sweetwater, their 2004 debut for Yep Roc.

The group toured the U.S. and Europe in 2005. Their second album Bloom, Red & The Ordinary Girl was released in March 2006. The album was recorded in London with producers Neil Brockbank (Nick Lowe, Bryan Ferry, Tanita Tikaram) and Robert Trehern (Paul McCartney, Van Morrison, Mark Knopfler), and featured appearances by Nick Lowe, Geraint Watkins and Bill Kirchen.

Blakey died in February 2026.

== Members ==
- Caitlin Cary (ex-Whiskeytown)
- Tonya Lamm (ex-Hazeldine)

=== Former ===
- Lynn Blakey (ex-Glory Fountain, Let's Active, Oh-OK)

== Discography ==
=== Albums ===
- 2004: Sweetwater (Yep Roc)
- 2006: Bloom, Red & the Ordinary Girl (Yep Roc)

=== Appeared on ===
- 2001: Alejandro Escovedo – A Man Under The Influence (Bloodshot)
- 2001: Greg Hawks & The Tremblers – Fool's Paradise (Yep Roc)
- 2008: Monty Warren – Trailer Park Angel (Doublenaught)

=== Primary Contributor on ===
- 2004: Various Artists – Por Vida: A Tribute To The Songs Of Alejandro Escovedo (Cooking Vinyl) – track 14, "Rhapsody"
- 2007: Various Artists – Musicians For Minneapolis (Electro-Voice) – track 3–13, "Lloyd's Mom"
