= Jon Lindsay (musician) =

American recording artist

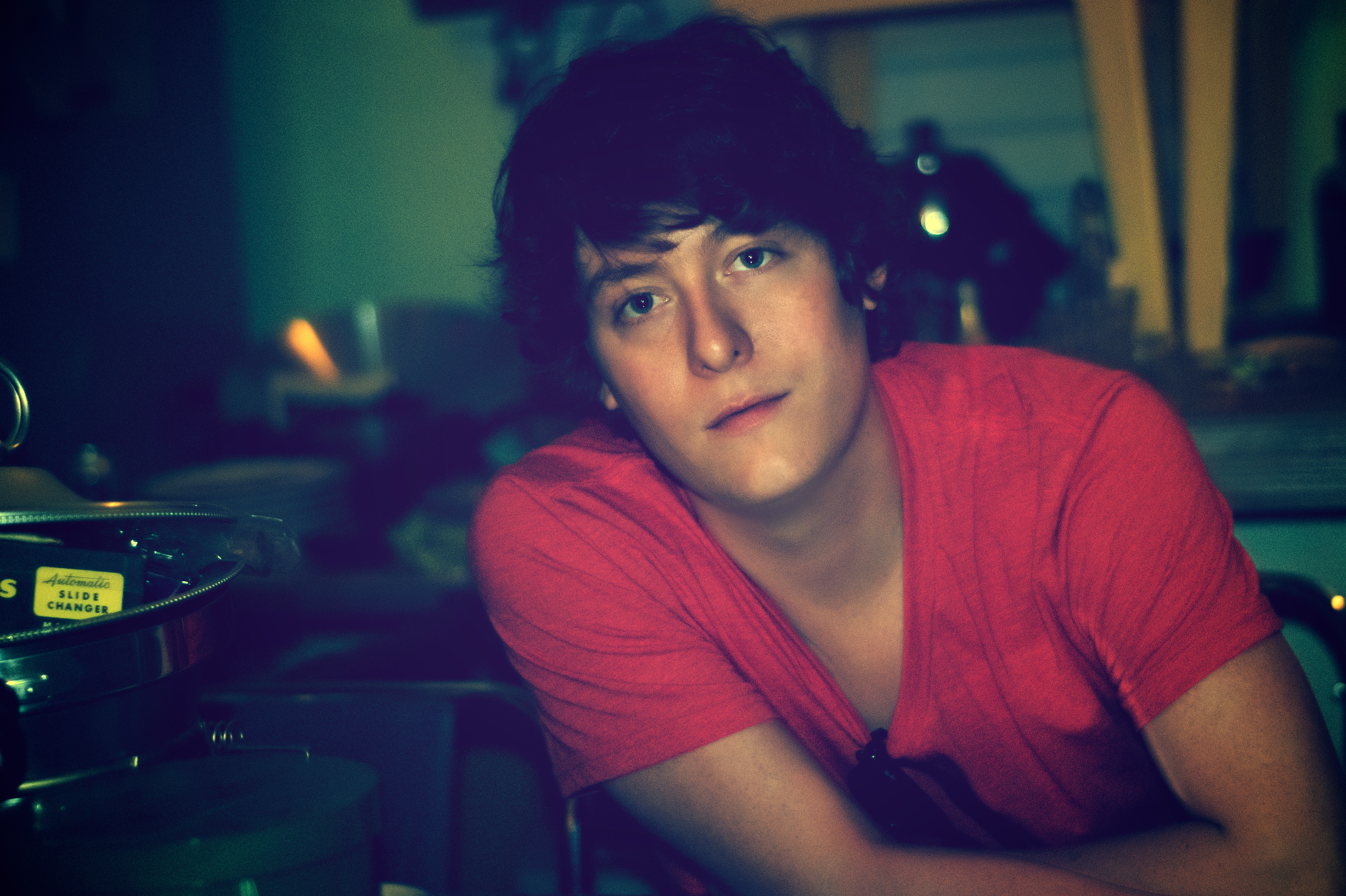
- Lindsay in 2009

Background information
- Born: Jonathan Lindsay Phillips; 1980 or 1981 (age 45–46); Portland, Oregon, U.S.
- Genres: Pop, rock, alternative, powerpop, indie, experimental, protest music
- Occupations: singer, songwriter, multi-instrumentalist, producer, music director
- Instruments: vocals, piano, organ, synthesizer, electric guitar, acoustic guitar, bass, percussion, drums
- Years active: 2007—present
- Labels: Daffin Records, File 13, Bear Hearts Fox, Chocolate Lab, No More Fake Labels, North Star Media (Publisher), Heron Bay, Redeye Distribution, Love Army Records
- Website: jonlindsaymusic.com

Jonathan Lindsay Phillips (born 1980/1) is an American recording artist. Lindsay made his full-length debut in 2010 with the LP Escape From Plaza-Midwood. In 2013, he cofounded the arts collective North Carolina Music Love Army with Caitlin Cary.

== Early life ==
Lindsay is from Portland, Oregon. He moved to Charlotte, North Carolina in the early 1990s. His father is an Episcopalian minister and transferred to a church in Charlotte. Lindsay attended West Charlotte High School. He then studied English at Queens University of Charlotte, and received an MFA in fiction writing from the School of the Art Institute of Chicago.

== Music career ==
His music has been used in Haven and MTV Cribs, Employee of the Month, and various commercials.

Lindsay began his career playing and singing in Benji Hughes, as well as fronting his own rock bands The Catch Fire and The Young Sons. Lindsay produced the debut album "Hearts Inc" for The Young Sons in 2007; the group disbanded in 2008.

Lindsay signed to Chicago-based label Chocolate Lab Records in May 2010. He made his solo debut with the release of his 15-song LP record Escape From Plaza-Midwood on August 17, 2010. The title is a reference to the Plaza Midwood neighborhood where Lindsay lived and a failed suburb by University of North Carolina at Charlotte where he grew up. Concurrent with the album release was the 7-inch EP Coping Strategies, which features four songs from Escape From Plaza-Midwood.

Shawn Haney for Performer wrote, "One of the best records to come out of the Southeast over the course of the decade, it’s full of life, bleeding with happiness and melancholy at the same time." Spencer Griffith for Indy Week wrote that the album is "a sprawling opus of pop rock splendor." Freeden Oeur of PopMatters gave the album an 8.

Justin Gerber for Consequence Of Sound wrote, "The opening track is terrific. Lindsay released an EP in 2009, but “End Times” plays as an honest-to-goodness introduction. Nostalgic without being sticky-sweet or reaching “sad bastard” status, Lindsay connects with his audience very well. “My Blue Angels” is power-pop at its finest, with driving percussion anchoring the catchy chorus."

Following Escape, Lindsay toured the US for most of 2011, both solo and with his backing band. He also signed a music publishing deal with North Star Media, performed at several festivals, and began preparations for his next releases: the EP Could It Be Christmas?, which has a loose holiday theme (November 29, 2011); Rumormill, the debut LP of Lindsay's side project The Catch Fire (No More Fake Labels, December 6, 2011).

Lindsay's LP Summer Wilderness Program was released on June 26, 2012. The music video for the album's third single “Oceans More” used 3-D information captured through the Microsoft Kinect.

Lindsay performed a Daytrotter Session on January 27, 2012, and a second Daytrotter Session on November 15, 2013.

On October 26, 2015, The Indy Weekly premiered "All Them Houses", the first single from Lindsay's Cities & Schools LP. The track was released digitally on November 6, 2015. On November 24, 2015, Paste Magazine premiered "Lifer", the second single from the Cities LP. The Cities & Schools LP was released on June 10, 2016. To promote the record Lindsay toured the US and Europe. Big Takeover premiered the video for "Little Queen Drum Machine" on June 26, 2016.

On December 22, 2017, File 13 released "Zebulon", a single from Lindsay which features a horn arrangement written and performed by Matt Douglas of The Mountain Goats. The song's narrative is delivered from the point-of-view of a racist southern farmer. Lindsay described the song as "psychedelic gospel pop". Lindsay previously performed "Zebulon" in 2016.

In 2024, Lindsay and Benji Hughes toured as a duo, with Lindsay opening for, then accompanying Hughes. In related interviews, Lindsay shared details about his forthcoming fourth full-length album, "Big Stage", recorded in Hollywood at Barefoot Studios, set for release in 2025.

Daffin Records released Lindsay's fourth album, "Big Stage", on May 16, 2025. The album launch included three singles with videos: "Big Stage", "Anti-Inflammatory", and "Dear Assassin", and a fourth single without a video, "Letters To Randy Newman". Lindsay toured the US supporting the record, with a run of west coast and east coast dates, as well as an official SXSW appearance. The tour was billed as "An Evening Extreme featuring Benji Hughes and Jon Lindsay", with Lindsay pulling nightly double duty, opening each show with a set heavy on songs from "Big Stage", then accompanying Hughes for the headline duo set, featuring songs from the entire Hughes songbook. At the show in Solvang, CA, on March 20th, Lindsay and Hughes were interviewed live on stage by Jeff Bridges prior to their performances. Jackson Browne joined the duo for a medley of songs by Warren Zevon later in the evening.

== Political activism ==
Lindsay is known for his political work, having released various songs in response to different political and social events.

Lindsay and Caitlin Cary of Whiskeytown co-founded the North Carolina Music Love Army, a non-profit music collective, in late June 2013 in support of the Moral Mondays protests. Caitlin Cary reached out to Lindsay to form the group after watching the video for his song "NC GOP Just Don't Know Me" on YouTube. Lindsay was inspired to create the song after viewing Django Haskins's song "We Are Not for Sale". The group recruited 40 members by July. They released the 10-track vinyl "We Are Not for Sale: Songs of Protest" on November 26, 2013, with proceeds being donated to progressive groups in North Carolina. Lindsay produced the album; Forbes wrote, "Phillips – then 5 releases into a solo career with momentum, publishing deals, recognition from Ad Age for TV commercial composition, and Vice's “Best of 2012” – decided in 2013 to devote the next 4 years to political music, taking the helm directing public relations for the NC Music Love Army- the 50+ member 501c3 he co-founded with Caitlin Cary (of Whiskeytown), in addition to serving as the group’s co-founder and music producer. The group included musical luminaries like Rhiannon Giddens, American Aquarium, Hiss Golden Messenger, The Love Language, Chris Stamey, Pierce Freelon, and members of the Mountain Goats and Black Crowes." The NC Music Love Army also released a song in response to the death of Lennon Lacy.

Lindsay was part of a group of 24 artists who performed in protest of the Public Facilities Privacy & Security Act. In December 2016, Lindsay organized and performed at "Hate Free By The Sea" in Wilmington, NC, a benefit concert in support of a UNCW student who received threats after being bullied by a faculty member because of her race, religion, and sexual orientation.

== Discography ==
- Magic Winter & the Dirty South EP (released in 2009; re-issued February 2011 on Chocolate Lab Records)
- Escape From Plaza-Midwood LP (August 17, 2010, Chocolate Lab Records)
- Coping Strategies 7-inch EP (August 17, 2010, Chocolate Lab Records)
- Could It Be Christmas? EP (November 29, 2011, Bear Hearts Fox)
- Summer Wilderness Program LP (June 26, 2012, Bear Hearts Fox)
- Cities & Schools LP (June 10, 2016, File 13 Records)
- Happy Old Pictures EP (2016) — with NC Music Love Army
- Big Stage LP (May 16, 2025, Daffin Records)
