= Pneumonia (album) =

Studio album by Whiskeytown
- Released: May 22, 2001
- Recorded: Dreamland (Hurley, New York); House of Blues Studios
- Genre: Alternative country
- Length: 57:11
- Label: Lost Highway Records
- Producer: Ethan Johns

Whiskeytown chronology
Strangers Almanac (1997)	Pneumonia (2001)

Professional ratings
Review scores
Source	Rating
Allmusic	4/5 stars
The Austin Chronicle	2.5/4 stars
Entertainment Weekly	B+
Pitchfork	8.1/10
The Guardian	4/5 stars
Los Angeles Times	3/4 stars
Rolling Stone	3/5 stars
Spin	8/10
Uncut	5/5 stars

Pneumonia is the third and final studio album by the alternative country band Whiskeytown, released on May 22, 2001 on Lost Highway Records. The album is noted for its troubled history which saw the band lose its record deal in the midst of the merger between Polygram and Universal Music Group, and the already volatile band fell apart as a result. The album sat on the shelf for nearly two years and it was said that over 100 songs were recorded during the 3 years. It was bootlegged heavily and gained a reputation as a great "lost" record from fans, before getting released by Lost Highway Records as something of an appetizer for Ryan Adams' 2001 album Gold.

Adams chose the album title Pneumonia for symbolic reasons. He felt it reflected the album's themes of being lovesick and succumbing to love. Plus, he saw the recording of the album as Whiskeytown "falling into this very slow and sleepy finality".

== Recording and release ==
By early 1999, Whiskeytown band members Ryan Adams, Caitlin Cary, and Mike Daly had started recording their follow-up to Strangers Almanac at an abandoned church in Woodstock, New York, called Dreamland Recording Studios. Ethan Johns, son of legendary producer Glyn Johns, was tapped to produce the album. Originally planned to be a double-album entitled Happy Go Bye Bye, the music recorded was intended to be a departure from the band's previous alt-country sound, prominently featuring Adams on piano, with classic pop arrangements featuring strings and horns. Notably, Daly co-wrote seven songs on the album with Adams; Smashing Pumpkins guitarist James Iha contributed guitar and co-wrote a song; Replacements bassist Tommy Stinson added guitar and dobro; and producer Johns played several instruments. Adams envisioned this collective effort to be in the vein of "those Woodstock albums, like The Band made in the '60s."

After recording, the album was mixed by Outpost Recordings house producer Scott Litt, best known for his work with R.E.M. But the band was unhappy with Litt's mix, so when the album was finally prepped for release by Lost Highway Records nearly two years later, Adams and Ethan Johns remixed it. Adams and Johns sought a classic Rolling Stones/Beatles sound with their mix, with little to no compression, and trimmed the album to 14 songs. (Johns also produced Adams' first two solo albums, Heartbreaker and Gold.)

== Break up ==
During the merger between Polygram and Universal, which ultimately put the album's release in limbo, the band decided to call it quits. Said Adams at the time: "The decision was made for us, really, just by time and circumstance, and I respect things that happen like that. By the time we went to make Pneumonia, there were only three surviving members. Everybody kind of pooled thoughts together for that album, and when it didn't come out, it was kind of like we reached an end that's inevitable, and we all knew it in the back of our minds."

In a 2001 interview with Magnet magazine, Mike Daly was even more candid: “If Pneumonia had come out when it was supposed to back in 1999, there would probably still be a Whiskeytown today.” Caitlin Cary agreed to a certain extent: “I suppose it’s possible that we might still be together, but Whiskeytown seemed to have something of a half-life. We never really worked very hard. We toured hard, but the way you make it in this industry is, besides being talented and driven, you have to play the game. Kiss a lot of ass along the way. And Ryan was never very good at any of that stuff.”

In 2001, Lost Highway Records announced it would release a five-song EP of Pneumonia outtakes entitled Deserters, but those plans were eventually scrapped. One leftover song from the sessions ("Choked Up") did, however, see the light of day on the 2003 Lost Highway rarities collection Lost & Found, Vol. 1.

== Track listing ==
All tracks are written by Ryan Adams unless otherwise stated.

No.	Title	Writer(s)	Length
1.	"The Ballad of Carol Lynn"	Ryan Adams, Mike Daly	3:04
2.	"Don't Wanna Know Why"	Ryan Adams, Mike Daly, Caitlin Cary	3:59
3.	"Jacksonville Skyline"		3:01
4.	"Reasons to Lie"	Ryan Adams, Mike Daly	3:30
5.	"Don't Be Sad"	Ryan Adams, Mike Daly, James Iha	3:21
6.	"Sit & Listen to the Rain"		4:05
7.	"Under Your Breath"	Mike Daly, Ryan Adams	3:28
8.	"Mirror, Mirror"	Ryan Adams, Mike Daly	3:15
9.	"Paper Moon"		4:42
10.	"What the Devil Wanted"	Ryan Adams, Mike Daly	3:38
11.	"Crazy About You"		2:46
12.	"My Hometown"		2:46
13.	"Easy Hearts"	Ryan Adams, Caitlin Cary	5:08
14.	"Bar Lights"		3:56
15.	"To Be Evil" (Hidden track)		3:44

== Personnel ==
=== Musicians ===
- Ryan Adams — Guitars, vocals, piano & harmonica
- Caitlin Cary — Fiddle & backing vocals
- Mike Daly — Guitars, pedal steel, lap steel, dulcimer, mandocello, mandolin, keyboards & backing vocals
- Brad Rice — Guitars
- Jennifer Condos — Bass
- Richard Causon — Keyboards
- James Iha — Guitars & backing vocals
- Tommy Stinson — Guitar & dobro
- James Jumbo Aumonier — Celeste
- Ethan Johns — Drums, bass, mandolin, mandocello, keyboards, percussion & guitars

=== Production credits ===
- Produced by Ethan Johns
- Engineered by Trina Shoemaker
- Mixed & engineered by Ethan Johns
- Recorded at Dreamland Studios & House Of Blues Studios
- Mixed at The Sound Factory
- Orchestral recording on "Paper Moon" by Glyn Johns at Capitol Studios
- Horns & Woodwinds on "The Ballad of Carol Lynn", "Easy Hearts", and "Mirror, Mirror" recorded by Al Schmitt at Capitol Studios
- Orchestral, Horn, and Woodwind Arrangement by Randy Brion
- Mastered by Doug Sax & Robert Hadley at the Mastering Lab, Hollywood, CA
