= Hazeldine (band) =

American alternative country band

- Origin: Albuquerque, New Mexico, U.S.
- Genres: Alternative country
- Years active: 1996–2002
- Labels: Glitterhouse; E-Squared; Polydor
- Past members: Shawn Barton; Tonya Lamm; Anne Tkach; Jeffrey Richards

Hazeldine were an American alternative country four-piece band based in Albuquerque, New Mexico. Members were Shawn Barton (vocals, guitar), Tonya Lamm (guitar, vocals), Anne Tkach (bass), and Jeffrey Richards (guitar, banjo, drums). They were more popular in Europe than in the US.

Hazeldine, a female-dominated group named after a street in their home town Albuquerque, New Mexico, began to get national recognition in 1997, when they played the "No Depression tour"—named after the fanzine associated with the alt.country movement—together with Rhett Miller's band Old 97's, and Whiskeytown fronted by Ryan Adams.

The band, described as "a mix of blistering rock, windswept country, and desert romance", recorded their debut album How Bees Fly in a pool hall of Route 66 in Albuquerque, and it saw a Europe-only release through the German independent record label Glitterhouse Records later in 1997. They had a brief deal with the major label Polydor that failed mainly due to a music industry merger where the record company was "swallowed" by the Universal Music Group.

Lamm currently tours with Tres Chicas, Tkach played and sang for numerous bands, among them Bad Folk, before her death in 2015, and Barton is married and living in Jacksonville, Florida.

== Discography ==
- How Bees Fly (Glitterhouse, 1997)
- Digging You Up (Polydor, 1998)
- Orphans (E-Squared, 1998)
- Double Back (Europe: Glitterhouse, 2001; U.S.: Okra-Tone, 2002)
