= Freakwater =

American band

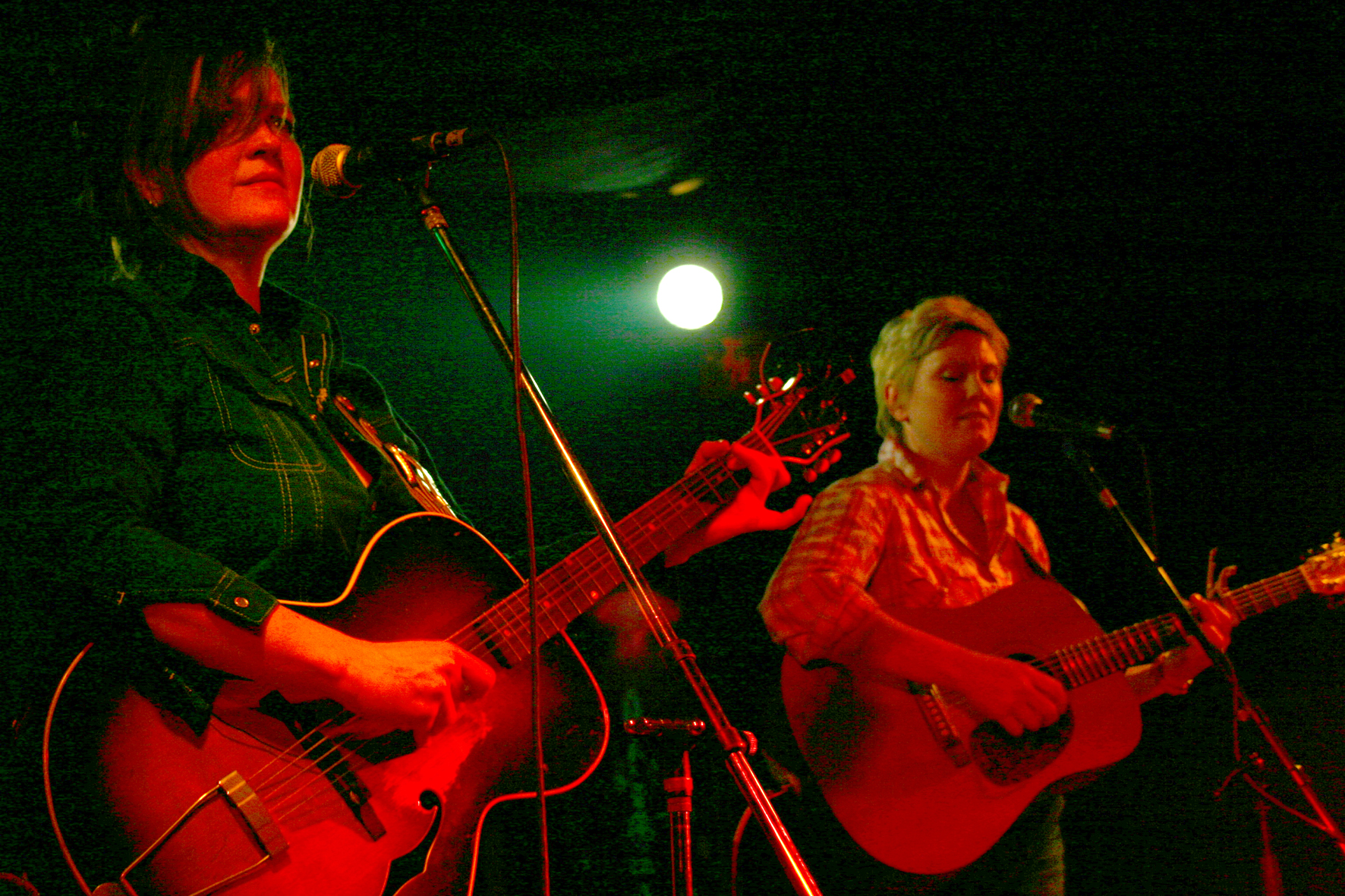
- Catherine Irwin and Janet Bean in 2006

Background information
- Origin: Louisville, Kentucky U.S.
- Genres: Alternative country
- Years active: 1989–present
- Labels: Amoeba Records, Thrill Jockey, Bloodshot, Glitterhouse, City Slang
- Members: Catherine Irwin; Janet Beveridge Bean; Dave Gay
- Past members: John Alexander Spiegel; Dan Scanlan; Peter Searcy; James Bond; Matthew 'Wink' O'Bannon; John Rice; Brian Dunn; Lisa Marsicek; Bob Egan; Max Konrad Johnston; Joel Batty; Brendan Burke; John Nickels
- Website: freakwater.net

Freakwater is an American alternative country band from Louisville, Kentucky, with one co-founding member living in Chicago. Freakwater is known for the lead vocals of Janet Bean and Catherine Irwin, who mix harmony and melody in idiosyncratic dissonant country-folk that is reminiscent of the Carter Family.

== History ==
=== Thrill Jockey ===
In 1989, Janet Beveridge Bean (of rock band Eleventh Dream Day) and Catherine Irwin founded the band, and they have been supported by several musicians since then, including members of Califone (2005 Thinking of You tour). Bassist David Wayne Gay, formerly of Stump The Host, is another long-time member of the band. They released their records on Chicago's Thrill Jockey label. From 2006 to 2013, Bean and Irwin worked on other projects. A reissue of 1993's Feels Like the Third Time as a 20-year anniversary restarted the duo playing together as Freakwater. In 2014, the band went out on the road, touring and playing the record as their main set.

=== Bloodshot Records ===
In February 2016, Freakwater released the record Scheherazade on Bloodshot Records. In advance of the full-length record—-the duo's first record since 2005-—Freakwater released a single called "The Asp And The Albatross".

=== Freakons ===
In 2013, and again in September 2017 and July 2021, Janet Bean and Catherine Irwin of Freakwater joined with Jon Langford and Sally Timms of the Mekons to be the Freakons, performing original and cover songs about coal mining in Appalachia, England, and Wales, to support the non-profit organization Kentuckians for the Commonwealth. Each time, the Freakons performed at the Hideout in Chicago, and elsewhere in Wisconsin. In 2013, they also performed at San Francisco's Hardly Strictly Bluegrass festival. In 2017, they were accompanied by violinists Jean Cook of New York City and Anna Krippenstapel of Louisville (The Other Years, Joan Shelley, etc.), and, only in Chicago, by Chicago/Louisville guitarist James Elkington (The Horse's Ha, etc.). In 2021, the same line-up, without Elkington, performed, and they released the live album Freakons, recorded at the 2017 Chicago performances.

== Artistry ==
Hilary Saunders of Paste Magazine assessed the band's musical style: "Old Paint musically looks backwards. It has the jauntiness of barn dances, complete with fiddles, dobros, and tambourines. Yet, Irwin and Bean's voices, content in their different ranges, somehow meld to tell country tales that still sound ahead of their time."

== Collaborations ==
- The band makes an appearance in the 1994 cult road movie Half-cocked.

== Discography ==
=== Albums ===
- 1989: Freakwater (Amoeba Records)
- 1991: Dancing Under Water / Freakwater (Amoeba Records)
- 1993: Feels Like the Third Time (Thrill Jockey;City Slang)
- 1995: Old Paint (Thrill Jockey; City Slang)
- 1995: June 6, 1994 (Glitterhouse Records)
- 1997: Dancing Under Water LP/CD (Thrill Jockey)
- 1998: Springtime LP/CD (Thrill Jockey)
- 1999: End Time LP/CD (Thrill Jockey)
- 2005: Thinking of You... (Thrill Jockey)
- 2016: Scheherazade (Bloodshot Records)

=== Singles ===
- 1990: "Your Goddamned Mouth" / "War Pigs" (1 1/4 York Records)
- 1993: "My Old Drunk Friend" / "Kentucky" (Thrill Jockey)
- 1995: "South of Cincinnati" / "Cut Me Out" (Thrill Jockey)
- 1999: "Hellbound" / "Lorraine" (Thrill Jockey)
- 2015: "The Asp & The Albatross" / "Fullerene" (Bloodshot Records)

=== Compilations ===
- 1993: Keep On The Sunny Side: A Tribute to the Carter Family (Amoeba Records)
- 1999: "Picture in My Mind" - Alt.Country Exposed Roots (K-Tel Records)
- 2019: "Sway" - Too Late to Pray: Defiant Chicago Roots (Bloodshot Records)
- 2021: "I Hope That I Don't Fall in Love with You" - The Closing Time 2020 - Janet Beveridge Bean & Sally Timms with the Pine Valley Cosmonauts (Virtue Cider)

=== Catherine Irwin solo (partial) ===
- 2003: Cut Yourself A Switch (Thrill Jockey)
- 2012: Little Heater (Thrill Jockey)

=== Janet Bean solo (partial) ===
- 1992: Jesus Built A Ship To Sing A Song To - Jeff Lescher & Janet Beveridge Bean (released under the name "Jeff and Janet") (Megadisc)
- 2004: Dragging Wonder Lake (Thrill Jockey)

=== Freakons ===
- 2021 Freakons (Fluff & Gravy Records)
