= Thomas O'Keefe =

Thomas O'Keefe (born January 22, 1964) is a North Carolina musician and author, best known for his work with Antiseen, Whiskeytown and Train.

== Early years ==
O'Keefe was born in New Haven, Connecticut, and lived in Connecticut until the age of 14. His family moved to Mooresville, NC (Metro Charlotte) in 1978.

Thomas O'Keefe attended South Iredell High School, finishing in 1982.

After discovering punk rock, O'Keefe joined and started a number of bands.

== Judas Bullethead and Antiseen ==
O'Keefe and Jeff Clayton started Jeff Leopard in 1983 and released Jeff Leopard Live at the Yellow Rose in 1984. Jeff Leopard's first show was in Boone, North Carolina, on October 1, 1983. Other North Carolina bands on that bill were N.R.G, Antiseen and Fetchin Bones.

O'Keefe tried out for the lead guitar player of Antiseen in 1984, but it never came to be. "I was too broke to afford an amp", O'Keefe stated in a mid-1990s Antiseen interview.

Judas Bullethead was the spinoff of Jeff Leopard. O'Keefe recorded it as Judas Leopard, his Jeff Leopard stage name. Clayton recorded as "Bullethead" an old nickname given to him by Joe Young.

"If they Itch, Scratch Em" was released in 1987 and reviewed in Spin in 1987. All instruments were played by Clayton and O'Keefe, even though neither was a drummer. The follow-up "Honest, It's just a Cold Sore", was released in 1988. "Honest" was recorded with a lot of studio musicians, including members of the band Black Acid Disco. After Judas Bullethead played a few shows, the band released "The King is Dead / Oh Baby" in 1989 and went on hiatus. A long talked about "Greatest Hits" CD is still a possibility.

O'Keefe officially joined Antiseen in 1988 and recorded the Blood of Freaks EP. Antiseen recorded over 20 records during the early 1990s. The band toured Europe three times and played concerts all over the US, including a cancelled show in Los Angeles on the day of the LA Riots.

After a very short stint as the band's manager, he stopped playing in Antiseen in the fall of 1995.

== Tour manager ==
O'Keefe first worked as a tour manager with Lustre in 1996. (Antiseen drummer Greg Clayton was the drummer of Lustre.) After Lustre was dropped by A&M Records, O'Keefe worked with D Generation, Whiskeytown, Stir, Mandy Moore and Tonic.

O'Keefe started tour-managing Train as their debut CD Train was just hitting. Since 1999, Train has played hundred of concerts in the US, Canada, South America, Europe and Australia. He also toured with Rockstar Supernova in 2007 with Johnny Colt, Lucas Rossi, Gilby Clarke and Tommy Lee.

Train finished its 2.5-year-long tour for the Save Me, San Francisco CD in December 2011. On that tour, Train performed 350 concerts in 30 countries, ending with a show in Guangzhou, China on December 10, 2011.

After 13 years, O'Keefe quit working with Train in September 2012 and moved to Nashville, Tennessee, where he worked at Crush Management Nashville Office. He worked with Ashley Monroe and Striking Matches. In 2014, as the Crush Nashville office closed, O'Keefe went back to tour managing, working with Sia, Dashboard Confessional and Third Eye Blind.

O'Keefe is currently the tour manager for Weezer.

== Other projects ==
O'Keefe played with ANTISEEN for their 20th, 25th, 30th, 35th and 40th anniversary shows. They recorded a live album called LIVE POSSUM in 2013 with the classic Antiseen lineup of Clayton, Young, O'Keefe, and Clayton.

O'Keefe and Jeff Clayton reunited Judas Bullethead for the first time in 25 years and performed at the Antiseen 30th anniversary show in October 2013. They played two shows in North Carolina in 2019 and are planning re-releasing the three EPs that are long out of print in 2020.

O'Keefe was an adjunct Professor at Segue 61, a local music college in Nashville which is affiliated with Catawba College in Salisbury, North Carolina.

O'Keefe's first book, "Waiting to Derail, Ryan Adams and Whiskeytown - Alt Country's Brillant Wreck"" was released by Skyhorse Publishing on June 26, 2018.

== Personal life ==
O'Keefe married his longtime girlfriend Stephanie Marriott on October 2, 1999, in Blowing Rock, North Carolina, and they live in Green Hills in Nashville, Tennessee. Their daughter, Sophia, was born in Raleigh in October 2007.

== Discography with Antiseen ==
=== LPs ===
- HONOUR AMONG THIEVES
- RAW SHIT
- NOISE FOR THE SAKE OF NOISE
- DESTRUCTO BLITZKRIEG
- GG ALLIN & ANTiSEEN: MURDER JUNKIES
- SOUTHERN HOSTILITY
- EAT MORE POSSUM
- TPOS release

=== 10-inch records ===
- Hell

=== CDs ===
- GG ALLIN & ANTiSEEN:MURDER JUNKIES
- SOUTHERN HOSTILITY
- NOISE FOR THE SAKE OF NOISE (ALSO RELEASED IN EUROPE ON ZUMA LABEL)
- THE DESTRUCTO YEARS
- GG ALLIN & ANTiSEEN:MURDER JUNKIES
- EAT MORE POSSUM

ZUMA/SAFEHOUSE

- HELL
- SOUTHERN HOSTILITY/EAT MORE POSSUM

=== Cassettes ===
- LIVE AT THE PARK ELEVATOR
- GG ALLIN AND ANTISEEN
- THE DESTRUCTO YEARS
- SOUTHERN HOSTILITY
- EAT MORE POSSUM

=== 8-track tapes ===
- ANTiSEEN CONQUERS THE NORTH (INCLUDES WXCI RADIO BROADCAST 7" AS WELL AS 6 EXTRA TRACKS)

=== 7-inch singles and EPs ===
- BLOOD OF FREAKS
- WXCI RADIO BROADCAST
- TWO HEADED DOG/CAUSE I LOVE YOU
- KILL THE BUSINESS (SPLIT w/RANCID VAT)
- WALKING DEAD/HAUNTED HOUSE
- MY GOD CAN BEAT UP YOUR GOD
- PSYCHO KILLER/HEAVY MUD
- TODAY YOUR LOVE/THE WITCH
- IT LOOKS GOOD FOR THEM TO CARE/FUCK ALL Y'ALL
- DATE RAPE (SPLIT w/RANCID VAT)
- FORNICATION/I CAN'T CONTROL MYSELF
- THE EVIL ONES
- GG ALLIN & ANTiSEEN
- BARBECUED BRAINS (BOOTLEG)
- THE VAULT OF ANTiSEEN
- WE GOT THIS FAR (WITHOUT YOU)/(WE WILL NOT) REMEMBER YOU (SUB POP)
- RAID OVER EUROPE /TEAR IT UP
- LIVE IN THE FATHERLAND
- I'VE AGED TWENTY YEARS IN FIVE
- MASTERS OF THE SKY/1969
- DEEDS OF THE DAMNED (SPLIT w/RANCID VAT)
- CACTUS JACK (SPLIT w/SEDUCER)
- 1+2 (JAPANESE 7")
- BLOOD OF FREAKS (reissue)
