= Mike Daly =

- Mike Daly (Songwriter, producer, Musician).

Background information
- Origin: New Jersey U.S.
- Genres: Pop, Rock, Indie, singer-songwriter
- Occupations: Songwriter, record producer, audio engineer, musician
- Instrument: Guitar

Michael A. Daly is an American record producer, songwriter, and multi-instrumentalist. Daly attended the Berklee College of Music in Boston. Daly first came to prominence as the Whiskeytown resident multi-instrumentalist and co-writer. He wrote or co-wrote many of the songs on the Pneumonia album and has contributed to all of Caitlin Cary's solo releases.

Daly has gone on to have a successful career as a studio musician, songwriter, and producer. He's worked with many artists in a range of different genres including Jason Mraz, Lana Del Rey, Imagine Dragons, Young the Giant, Grace Potter and the Nocturnals, The Plain White T's, and Jimmy Barnes.

Daly has spoken as a panelist at the South by Southwest Festival and has appeared on numerous television programs including The Tonight Show with Jay Leno, Good Morning America, and Regis and kelly. He's also performed live at Austin City Limits.

Daly is currently Executive Director of A&R and Music Publishing at Disney Music Group (Hollywood Records, Buena Vista Records, and Disney Music Publishing).

He also served as a mentor for the 2017 Techstars Music Accelerator Program.
