= Whiskeytown =

American alternative country band

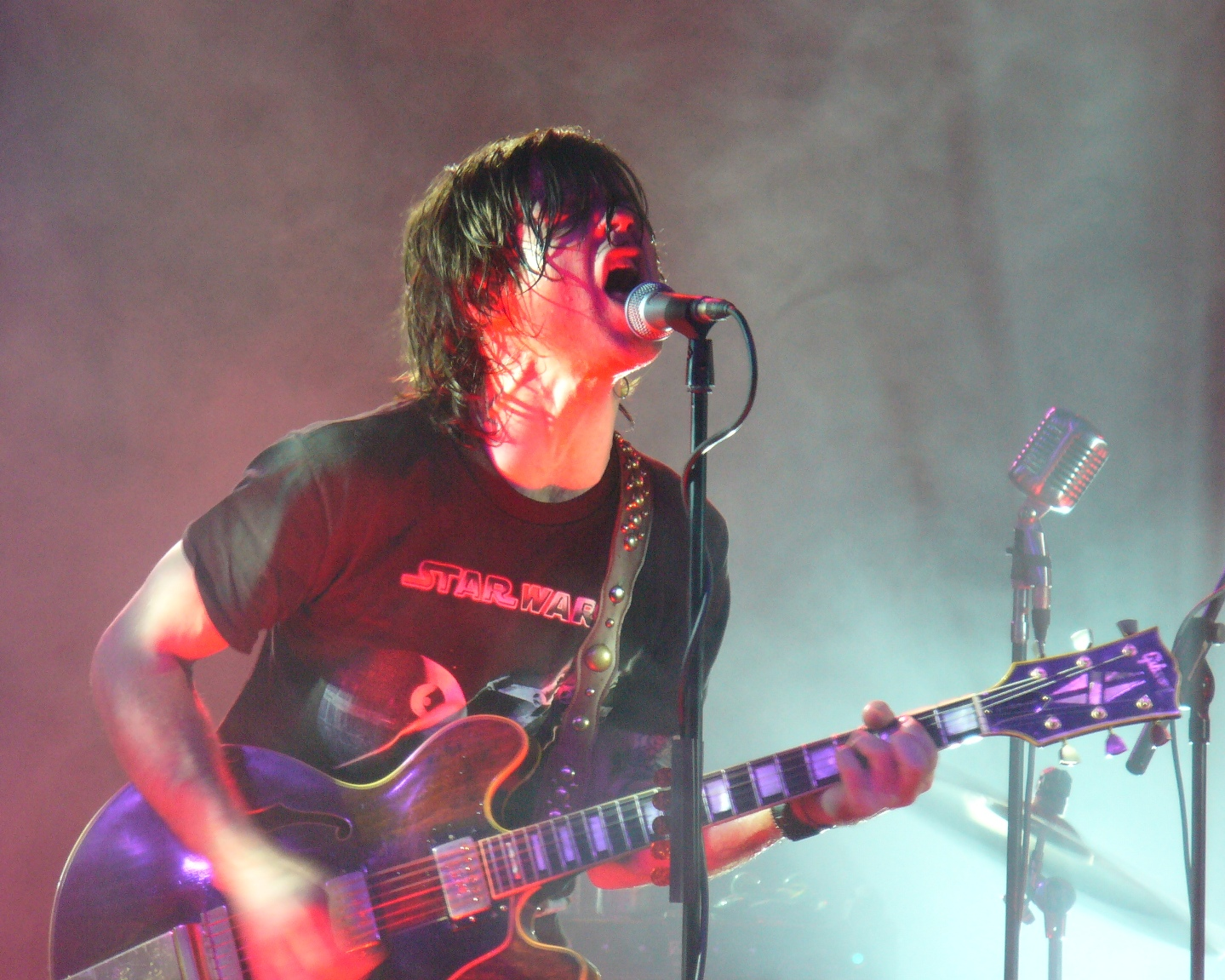
- Ryan Adams (pictured) and Caitlin Cary were the two members active throughout Whiskeytown's lifespan.

Background information
- Origin: Raleigh, North Carolina, U.S.
- Genre: Alternative country
- Years active: 1994–2000; 2005 (reunion)
- Labels: Mood Food; Bloodshot; Outpost; Geffen; Lost Highway
- Past members: Ryan Adams; Caitlin Cary; Mike Daly; Phil Wandscher; Brad Rice; Skillet Gilmore; Steve Terry; James Iha; Steve Grothmann

Whiskeytown was an American alternative country band formed in 1994 from Raleigh, North Carolina. Fronted by Ryan Adams, the group included members Caitlin Cary, Phil Wandscher, Eric "Skillet" Gilmore, and Mike Daly. They disbanded in 2000 with Adams leaving to pursue his solo career.

The band released three albums. No two albums shared a consistent lineup; Adams and Cary remained the only constants.

== History ==
After performing punk rock with a band called The Patty Duke Syndrome, Adams founded Whiskeytown in 1994 in Raleigh, North Carolina. The music of country-rock artist Gram Parsons served as his inspiration. The band initially consisted of Adams, violinist Caitlin Cary, drummer Eric "Skillet" Gilmore, bassist Steve Grothmann and guitarist Phil Wandscher.

=== Faithless Street era (1995–1996) ===
Faithless Street, released on Mood Food Records in 1995, established the band as one of the genre's leaders, thanks to glowing reviews in publications such as No Depression, and helped the band score a major-label record deal with the Geffen Records imprint Outpost.

Faithless was re-released on the imprint in 1998 with nearly a dozen bonus tracks from the era. Among the bonus tracks were previously unreleased tracks and tracks that had been released on earlier albums and EPs, including Strangers Almanac and Rural Free Delivery. One track, "Oklahoma," was removed. Adams claimed that the reason for the re-release was the muddy sound of the original version and his distaste for "Oklahoma," which was added to the album despite his objections.

=== Strangers Almanac era (1997–1998) ===
Whiskeytown's 1997 major-label debut, Strangers Almanac, helped to establish Adams' reputation as a songwriter. In the midst of the album's recording, Gilmore and Grothmann left, and Wandscher left soon after the album's release. The band cycled through numerous members throughout the next year, including Jeff Rice and Steven Terry, both of whom were involved in the recording of Almanac but left later that year.

The band's reputation preceded it in the live setting. In a 1997 Detroit Free Press article titled "Whiskeytown: half band, half soap opera," a June 1997 show at Mac's Bar in Lansing, Michigan was described by fans as a half-baked performance.

Despite the band's internal strife, Almanac was a successful album with critics, with the tracks "16 Days" and the Replacements-esque "Yesterday's News" receiving significant radio play. The positive reviews came from increasingly mainstream publications such as Rolling Stone, who claimed at the time, "If there's to be a Nirvana among the bands that are imprecisely dubbed alternative country, look to Whiskeytown". In January 1998, the band taped a live performance for Austin City Limits.

During the tour for Stranger's Almanac, most of the band was fired or quit at a concert in Kansas City. The only people who started and finished the tour were Adams, Caitlin Cary, Mike Daly and tour manager Thomas O'Keefe.

=== Pneumonia and the band's demise (1999–2001) ===
The band managed to add a new core member in multi-instrumentalist Mike Daly, who contributed significantly to the band's sound on their third album, Pneumonia.

The album's recording was a much different affair from the first two—likely because of the band's constantly changing dynamic. The traditional country of the first two albums, especially Faithless, was largely replaced with a more sophisticated country-rooted pop sound, very similar to Wilco's 1999 album Summerteeth. Also adding to the different flavor of the album was a cast of guest stars, including The Replacements' Tommy Stinson and The Smashing Pumpkins' James Iha.

Despite the album's completion and Whiskeytown's sizable fanbase, Outpost Records closed during the merger between Polygram and Universal, and as a result the album stayed in limbo for nearly two years, effectively ending the band.

Lost Highway Records, the roots-minded label imprint of Universal Music, picked up the album after signing Adams (who, in the interim, recorded his debut solo record Heartbreaker on indie label Bloodshot Records) and released it in May 2001.

=== Post-Whiskeytown and talk of reunion ===
Since the band dissolved, most core members have chosen to remain active in music. Cary, who married original drummer Eric "Skillet" Gilmore, has released three solo albums and created a female folk trio named Tres Chicas. In 2010 she formed a duo group called The Small Ponds with Matt Douglas of Raleigh band The Proclivities. In 2013, Cary and solo artist Jon Lindsay co-founded the NC Music Love Army – a collective of many notable musicians from North Carolina who oppose the leadership of the newly emerged Republican supermajority in their home state. Between 2013 and 2014, the group has put out nine releases on their own label (Love Army Records), as well as thru Redeye Distribution and Bloodshot Records.

Adams has remained in the spotlight since the band's breakup, releasing numerous solo albums, including three in 2005. In 2004, Adams founded Ryan Adams and The Cardinals, an alternative rock band. The band released several albums before disbanding in 2009. He has drawn considerable praise from such as Elton John and Phil Lesh for his songwriting. In February 2001, original Whiskeytown guitarist Phil Wandscher joined Adams at a Seattle show to perform two songs. It was the first time the two had appeared onstage together in 3½ years.

Adams and Cary have claimed to be reuniting Whiskeytown on multiple occasions, as recently as 2010, but nothing has been released. He told an interviewer in January 2017 that he was writing a book about the band, but had no plans to record or tour with Whiskeytown. A scheduling conflict was blamed as the reason for the reunion not taking place. The band did reunite for a one-off, impromptu gig after one of Adams' shows in Raleigh, North Carolina, in 2005. Gilmore, Cary, and Adams were joined on-stage by Adams' pedal steel player, Jon Graboff, and bassist Catherine Popper.

== Members ==
=== Founding members ===
- Ryan Adams – vocals, rhythm guitar
- Caitlin Cary – fiddle, vocals, percussion
- Eric "Skillet" Gilmore – drums, percussion
- Steve Grothmann – bass guitar
- Phil Wandscher – lead guitar, vocals

=== Later members ===
- Ed Crawford – guitar
- Ron Bartholomew – bass guitar
- Steven Terry – drums, percussion
- Brad Rice – electric guitar
- Mike Daly – bass guitar, keyboards, guitar, mandolin, vocals
- Jeff Rice – bass guitar
- Jenni Snyder – bass guitar
- Chris Laney – bass guitar
- Bill Ladd – pedal steel guitar – studio session musician, appeared on Theme for a Trucker, Wim Wenders' movie The End of Violence
- Mike Santoro – bass – Former member of "The Selves," a band from Northern New Jersey
- Chris Riser – lap steel guitar, pedal steel guitar – 1994–95, also a member of Chapel Hill's Pine State
- Nicholas Petti – pedal steel guitar – 1995–96, also a member of Chapel Hill's Pine State
- Jon Wurster – drums
- James Iha – guitar

== Discography ==
=== Albums ===
Studio albums

- 1995: Faithless Street
- 1997: Strangers Almanac
- 2001: Pneumonia

Unreleased

- 1996: Those Weren't the Days
- 1996: The Freightwhaler Sessions
- 1997: Forever Valentine

=== EPs ===
- 1995: Angels
- 1997: Theme for a Trucker
- 1997: Rural Free Delivery
- 1997: In Your Wildest Dreams

=== Singles ===
- 1997: "16 Days"
- 1998: "Yesterday's News"
- 1998: Car Songs (split 7-inch w/ Neko Case & The Sadies)
- 2001: "Don't Be Sad"
- 2009: "San Antone" / "The Great Divide"

=== Compilations ===
- 1996: "Blank Generation" from Who the Hell? A Tribute to Richard Hell
- 1996: Smash Hits Opry
- 1996: "The Great Divide" from Power of Tower: Live from the WXDU Lounge
- 1997: "Bottom of the Glass" from Straight Outta Boone County
- 1997: "Theme for a Trucker" from The End of Violence Soundtrack
- 1997: "Busted" from Revival Vol. 2: Kudzu & Hollerin' Contest
- 1998: "Wither, I'm a Flower" from Hope Floats: Music from the Motion Picture
- 1998: "Me and My Ticket" from The Garden Place: Songs By Our Friends
- 1998: "I Hope It Rains At My Funeral" from Real: The Tom T. Hall Project
- 1999: "Nervous Breakdown" from Alt.Country Exposed Roots
- 1999: "A Song for You" from Return of the Grievous Angel: A Tribute to Gram Parsons
- 1999: "Silver Wings" from Poor Little Knitter On the Road
- 2003: "Choked Up" from Lost Highway: Lost & Found Vol. 1
- 2004: "Faithless Street" from No Depression: What It Sounds Like Vol. 1
- 2006: "Give Me Another Chance" from Big Star, Small World
