= Caitlin Cary =

American musician

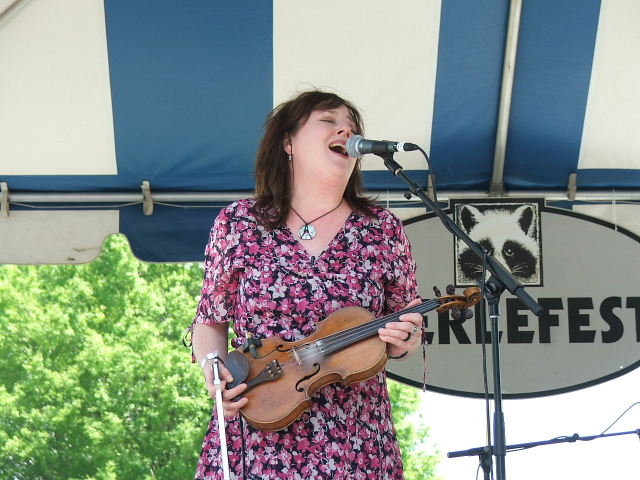
- Caitlin Cary at Merlefest 2006

Background information
- Born: October 28, 1968 (age 57); Seville, Ohio, U.S.
- Genre: Country
- Occupations: Singer, songwriter
- Instruments: Vocals, violin
- Years active: 1994–present
- Label: Yep Roc
- Website: www.caitlincary.com

Caitlin Cary (born October 28, 1968) is an alternative country musician and visual artist from Seville, Ohio.

== Early life ==
Caitlin Cary is the youngest of seven siblings (all older brothers). Her entire family was involved in music to some degree, with her parents' love for singing and her father's interest in building instruments. She began to play the violin at age five, but put it aside as a teenager. In addition to the violin, she also played her father's harpsichords, where she wrote some of her own songs.

Cary went to college at the College of Wooster in Ohio. She began working on a degree in English. During her college time, she picked up playing the violin again, and she formed a small 'jokey' band called Garden Weasels. After graduating from the College of Wooster, she enrolled in the graduate program in creative writing at North Carolina State.

== Career ==
=== Whiskeytown ===
In 1993, musician Ryan Adams contacted Cary and asked her if she would play violin in a band that he was starting. Cary agreed, and they formed Whiskeytown.

=== Solo career ===
In 2000, Cary released her first solo EP Waltzie, produced by Chris Stamey.

Cary's debut album While You Weren't Looking was released in 2002 and featured Whiskeytown's Mike Daly (guitar), who co-wrote and played on most of the songs. Personnel also included Mike Santoro (bass), Skillet Gilmore (drums), and Jen Gunderman (keyboards). Thad Cockrell, Tonya Lamm (Hazeldine), and Lynn Blakey provided harmonies.

2003's I'm Staying Out featured guest appearances from Mary Chapin Carpenter, Mitch Easter, Don Dixon, Greg Humphreys, Audley Freed, and Jane Scarpantoni.

=== Other projects ===
In 2005, Cary released an album of duets, Begonias, with Thad Cockrell with songs composed by the duo.

In 2013, Cary co-founded the North Carolina Music Love Army with Jon Lindsay. The collective of North Carolina–based musicians created the We Are Not For Sale: Songs of Protest LP to oppose the regressive actions of the North Carolina General Assembly. The album was released worldwide via Redeye on November 26, 2013.

In 2010, Caitlin performed with Matt Douglas (lead singer and songster for The Proclivities) in Raleigh's annual Love Hangover show, in which male/female duos sing love song covers. They then formed the group Small Ponds, who released an EP on Last Chance Records in September 2010.

=== Visual arts ===
Cary is an accomplished visual artist, creating fabric collages she calls "Needle Print." Examples of her work are prominently featured on her website.

== Personal life ==
Cary is married to drummer/artist Skillet Gilmore, and they live in South Raleigh, North Carolina.

== Discography ==
=== Solo ===
Albums

- 2002: While You Weren't Looking (Yep Roc)
- 2003: I'm Staying Out (Yep Roc)

EPs

- 2000: Waltzie (Yep Roc)
- 2002: Thick Walls Down (Yep Roc)

=== With Whiskeytown ===
- 1995: Faithless Street (Outpost)
- 1997: Strangers Almanac (Outpost)
- 2001: Pneumonia (Lost Highway)

=== With Tres Chicas ===
- 2004: Sweetwater (Yep Roc)
- 2006: Bloom, Red & the Ordinary Girl (Yep Roc)

=== With Thad Cockrell ===
- 2005: Begonias (Yep Roc)

=== With The Small Ponds ===
- 2010: Caitlin Cary & Matt Douglas Are The Small Ponds (Last Chance)

=== With NC Music Love Army ===
Albums

- 2013: We Are Not For Sale: Songs Of Protest (Redeye)

Singles

- 2014: "Stick To The Plan" (Bloodshot)
- 2014: "Dear Mr. McCrory" (Redeye)
- 2015: "The Ballad of Lennon Lacy" (Redeye)
- 2016: "When You Were A young Man" (Love Army Records)

=== As guest artist ===
- 2019: Horace Holloway – Tin Foil Stars (Dirtleg)
- 2016: Jon Lindsay – Cities & Schools (File 13)
- 2016: James Olin Oden – Deeper Dance (self-released / Bandcamp)
- 2014: Ocean Carolina – All The Way Home (Old Hand)
- 2013: Chris Stamey – Lovesick Blues (Yep Rock)
- 2013: Kenny Roby – Memories & Birds (Little Criminal / MRI)
- 2013: James Olin Oden – The Craic is Free (self-released / Bandcamp)
- 2012: American Aquarium – Burn.Flicker.Die (Last Chance)
- 2012: The Riverbreaks – Wildfire (self-released)
- 2011: James Olin Oden – Samhain's March: A Winter Journey (self-released / Bandcamp)
- 2010: American Aquarium – Small Town Hymns (Last Chance)
- 2010: Sally Spring – Made of Stars (Sniffinpup)
- 2008: Yarn – Empty Pockets (Ardsley)
- 2008: Chatham County Line – IV (Yep Roc)
- 2008: American Aquarium: The Bible and the Bottle (self-released)
- 2008: Monty Warren – Trailer Park Angel (Doublenaught)
- 2007: Simon Alpin – On The Wire (Ravine)
- 2007: Stephen Kellogg & the Sixers – Glassjaw Boxer (Atlantic / Everfine)
- 2006: Cracker – Greenland (Cooking Vinyl)
- 2006: Patty Hurst Shifter – Too Crowded on the Losing End (Evo / Blue Rose)
- 2006: Sally Spring – Mockingbird (Sniffinpup)
- 2005: Chatham County Line – Route 23 (Yep Roc)
- 2005: Chris Stamey and Yo la Tengo – A Question of Temperature (Yep Roc)
- 2005: Terry Anderson – Terry Anderson and the Olympic Ass-Kickin Team (Doublenaught)
- 2004: Chris Stamey – Travels In The South (Yep Roc)
- 2004: Something For Kate – The Official Fiction (Epic / Murmur)
- 2003: Goner – How Good We Had It (Bifocal Media)
- 2003: Something For Kate – Song For A Sleepwalker (Murmur)
- 2003: Tangerine Trousers – Dressed for Success (self-released)
- 2003: Thad Cockrell – Warmth & Beauty (Yep Roc)
- 2001: Alejandro Escovedo – A Man Under the Influence (Bloodshot)
- 2001: Greg Hawks & The Tremblers – Fool's Paradise (Yep Roc)
- 2001: Hazeldine – Double Back (Glitterhouse / Okra-Tone)
- 2001: Thad Cockrell – Stack of Dreams (Miles of Music)
- 2000: Kenny Roby – Mercury's Blues (Glitterhouse / Rice Box)
- 2000: Tami Hart – No Light in August (Mr. Lady)

=== As primary artist ===
- 2004: Various Artists – Por Vida: A Tribute To The Songs Of Alejandro Escovedo (Cooking Vinyl) – disc 2 track 11, "By Eleven"

=== As composer ===
- 2002: Shannon Lyon – Dharma (Inbetweens) – track 12, "Houses On The Hill" (Hidden Track) co-written with Ryan Adams
- 2003: Joan Baez – Dark Chords On A Big Guitar (Koch) – track 3, "Rosemary Moore"
