= Phil Wandscher =

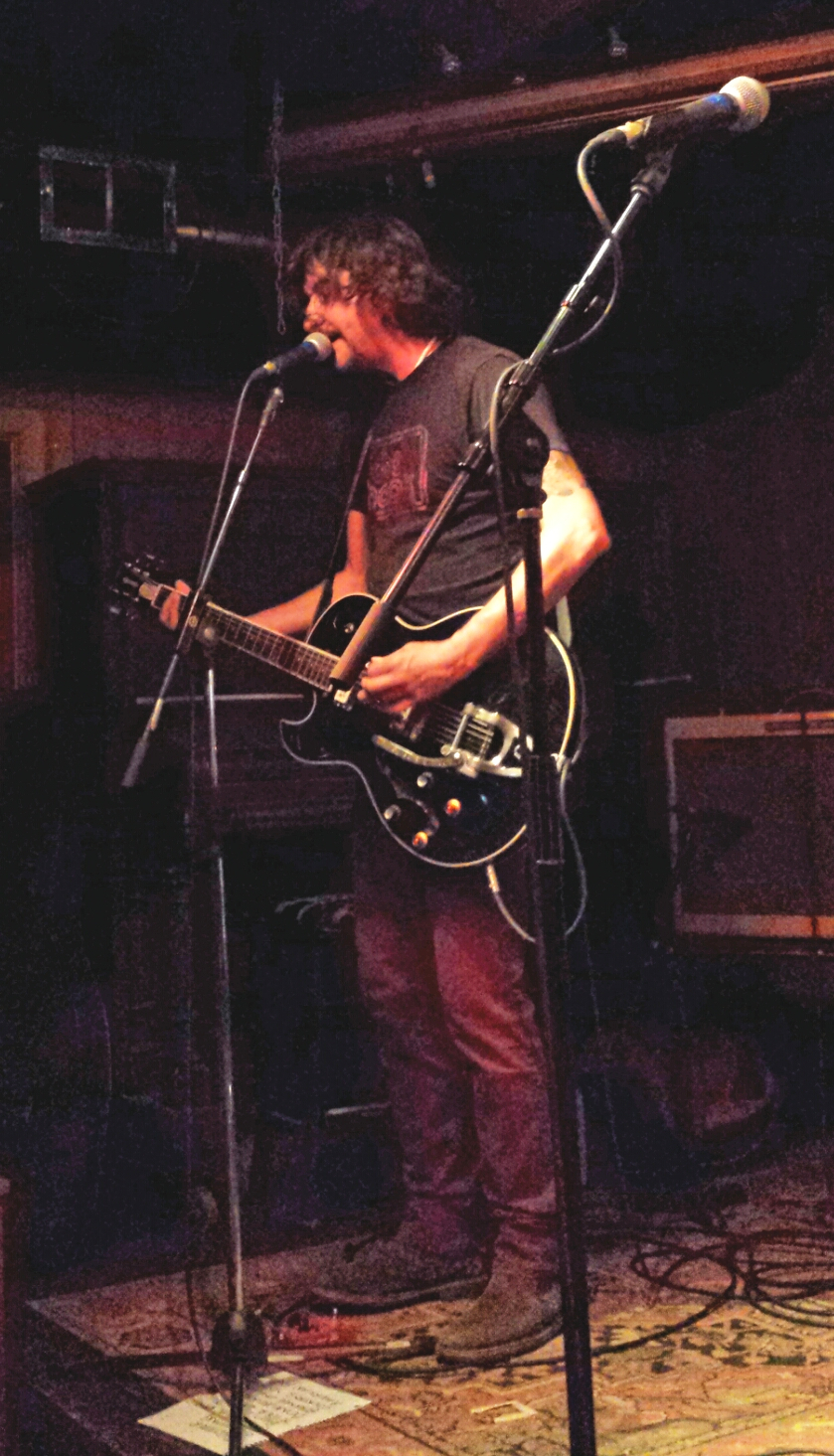
- Wandscher performing with Bad Luck Johnathan at the Hideout, Chicago in 2015

Background information
- Born: 1970 (age 55–56)
- Genres: Alt-country
- Occupation: Musician
- Instruments: Guitar; Vocals
- Formerly of: Whiskeytown, Bad Luck Johnathan, Nada Surf, Death Cab For Cutie

Phil Wandscher is the former guitarist of the alt-country band Whiskeytown, and is now a member of Jesse Sykes and the Sweet Hereafter.

Wandscher appeared on Death Cab For Cutie's album Transatlanticism, singing backing vocals on the album's title track. He also contributed lead guitar to two Nada Surf tracks: "Comes a Time", from the 2005 release The Weight Is a Gift, and "Are You Lightning", from 2008's Lucky. Wandscher also performs with Jon Langford's "glam-voodoo space rock" project Bad Luck Jonathan.
