= Alternative country =

Subgenre of country music

- Stylistic origins: Country; alternative rock; country rock; outlaw country; neotraditional country; progressive country; punk rock; rockabilly; indie rock; heartland rock; Southern rock; folk rock
- Cultural origins: Late 20th century

Other topics
- Americana; cowpunk; folk punk; gothic country; indie folk; Southern rock

Alternative country (also alt-country, insurgent country, Americana) is a loosely defined subgenre of country music that includes acts that differ significantly in style from mainstream country music, mainstream country rock, and country pop. Most frequently, the term has been used to describe certain country music bands and artists that are also defined as or have incorporated influences from genres such as alternative rock, indie rock, punk rock, heartland rock, Southern rock, progressive country, outlaw country, neotraditional country, Texas country, Red Dirt, roots rock, indie folk, folk rock, rockabilly, bluegrass, and honky tonk.

== Definitions and characteristics ==
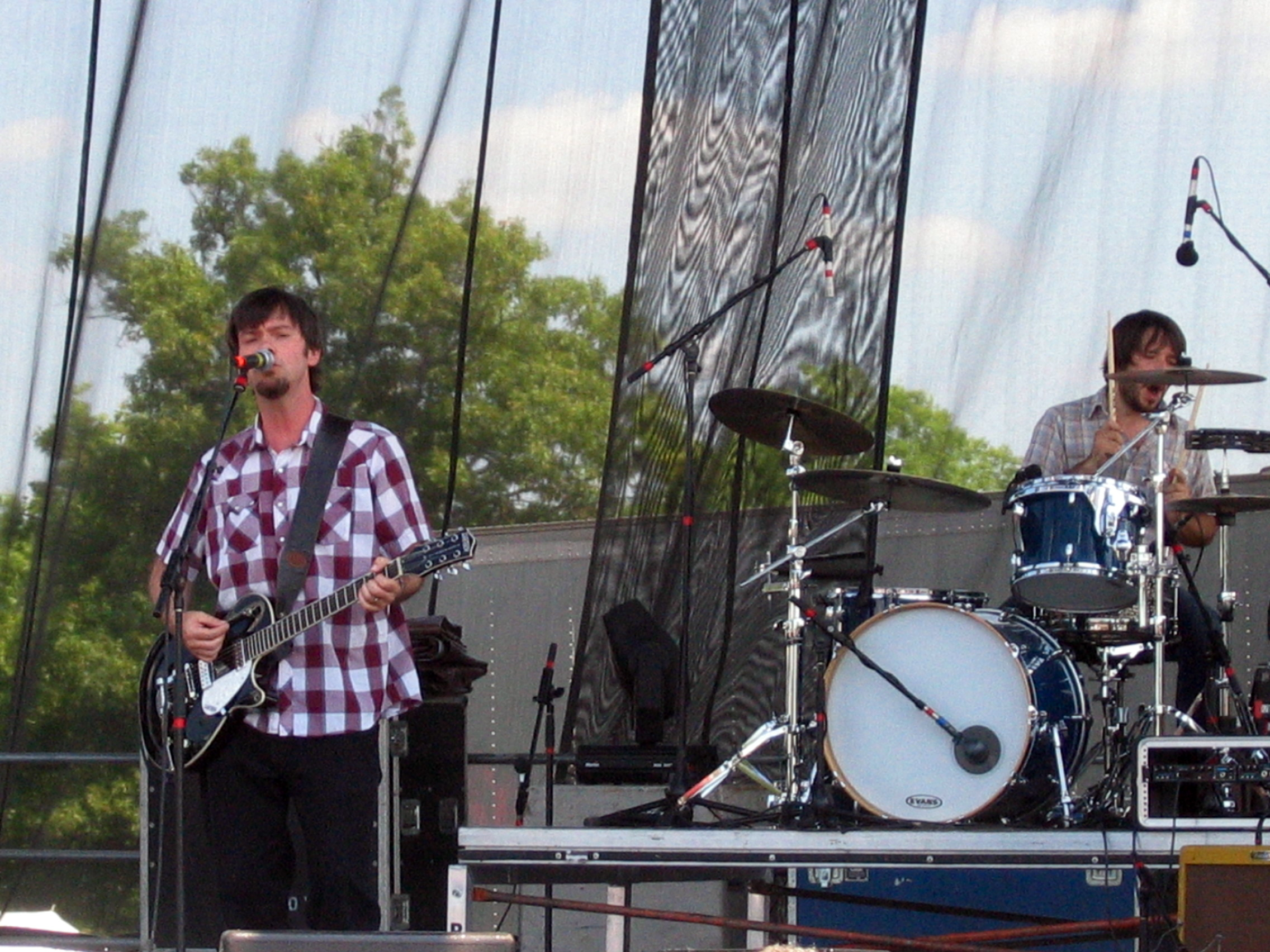
Son Volt performing in 2005

In the 1990s, the term alternative country, paralleling alternative rock, began to be used to describe a diverse group of musicians and singers operating outside the traditions and industry of mainstream country music. Many eschewed the increasingly polished production values and pop sensibilities of the Nashville-dominated industry for a more lo-fi sound, frequently infused with a strong punk and rock and roll aesthetic. Lyrics may be bleak or socially aware, but also more heartfelt and less likely to use the clichés sometimes used by mainstream country musicians. In other respects, the musical styles of artists that fall within this genre often have little in common, ranging from traditional American folk music and bluegrass, through rockabilly and honky-tonk, to music that is indistinguishable from mainstream rock or country. This already broad labeling has been further confused by alternative country artists disavowing the movement, mainstream artists declaring they are part of it, and retroactive claims that past or veteran musicians are alternative country. No Depression, the best-known magazine dedicated to the genre, declared that it covered "alternative-country music (whatever that is)".

== History ==
Alternative country drew on traditional American country music, the music of working people, preserved and celebrated by practitioners such as Woody Guthrie, Hank Williams, and the Carter Family, often cited as major influences. Another major influence was country rock, the result of fusing country music with a rock & roll sound. The third factor was punk rock, which supplied an energy and DIY attitude.

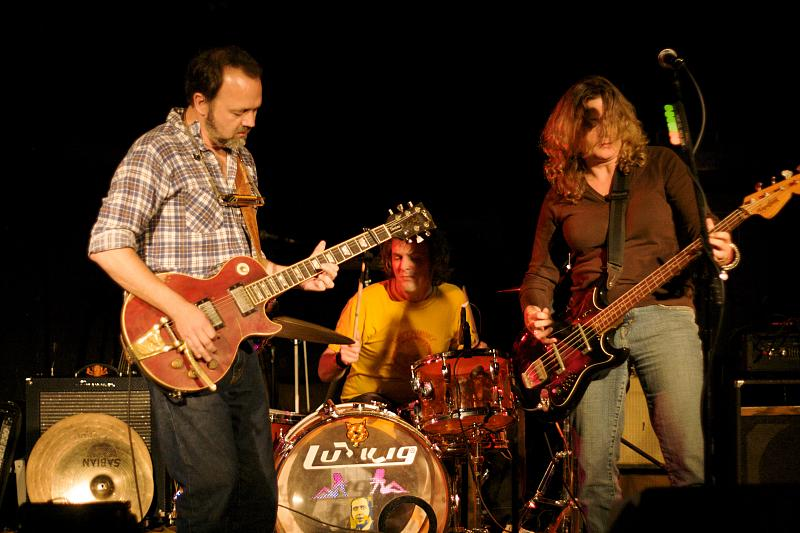
Blue Mountain on stage in 2008

Attempts to combine punk and country had been pioneered by a number of bands prior to 1990, including Nashville's Jason and the Scorchers, San Francisco’s American Music Club, and the Minneapolis-based band the Jayhawks, along with the 1980s Southern Californian cowpunk scene with bands such as the Long Ryders and X. However, the "alt country" label did not gain popularity among music journalists until the release of Uncle Tupelo's 1990 LP No Depression, which has been credited as being the first "alt-country" album. It is also the namesake of the online notice board and eventually magazine that underpinned the movement. They released three more influential albums, signing to a major label, before they broke up in 1994, with members and figures associated with them going on to form three major bands in the genre: Wilco, Son Volt and Bottle Rockets. Bottle Rockets signed, along with acts like Freakwater, Old 97's and Robbie Fulks, to the Chicago-based indie label, Bloodshot, who pioneered a version of the genre under the name insurgent country. The bands Blue Mountain, Whiskeytown, Blood Oranges and Drive-By Truckers further developed this tradition before most began to move more in the direction of rock music in the 2000s.

== See also ==
- List of alternative country musicians
- Americana (music)
- Heartland rock
- Red Dirt (music)
- Southern rock
- Outlaw country
- Gothic country
- Indie folk
- Texas country music
- Progressive country
- Country rock
- Cow punk
