= 1996 San Francisco Giants season =

1996 San Francisco Giants
- League: National League
- Division: West
- Ballpark: 3Com Park at Candlestick Point
- City: San Francisco
- Owners: Peter Magowan
- General managers: Bob Quinn
- Managers: Dusty Baker
- Television: KTVU (Ted Robinson, Mike Krukow, Lon Simmons); SportsChannel Pacific (Mike Krukow, Duane Kuiper, Lon Simmons)
- Radio: KNBR (Ted Robinson, Hank Greenwald, Mike Krukow, Duane Kuiper); SP Radio (Julio Gonzalez, Rene De La Rosa, Amaury Pi-Gonzalez)

The 1996 San Francisco Giants season was the Giants' 114th season in Major League Baseball, their 39th season in San Francisco since their move from New York following the 1957 season, and their 37th at 3Com Park at Candlestick Point. The team finished in fourth place in the National League West with a 68–94 record, 23 games behind the San Diego Padres.

== Offseason ==
- October 6, 1995: Mike Benjamin was traded by the Giants to the Philadelphia Phillies for Jeff Juden and Tommy Eason (minors).
- October 26, 1995: John Roper was claimed off waivers from the Giants by the Cincinnati Reds.
- December 1, 1995: Rikkert Faneyte was sent to the Texas Rangers by the San Francisco Giants as part of a conditional deal.
- March 26, 1996: Scott Service was released by the Giants.

== Regular season ==
=== Season standings ===
NL West
Team	W	L	Pct.	GB	Home	Road
San Diego Padres	91	71	.562	—	45‍–‍36	46‍–‍35
Los Angeles Dodgers	90	72	.556	1	47‍–‍34	43‍–‍38
Colorado Rockies	83	79	.512	8	55‍–‍26	28‍–‍53
San Francisco Giants	68	94	.420	23	38‍–‍44	30‍–‍50

=== Record vs. opponents ===
1996 National League record Source: MLB Standings Grid – 1996
Team	ATL	CHC	CIN	COL	FLA	HOU	LAD	MON	NYM	PHI	PIT	SD	SF	STL
Atlanta	—	7–5	7–5	5–7	6–7	6–6	5–7	10–3	7–6	9–4	9–3	9–4	7–5	9–4
Chicago	5–7	—	5–8	5–7	6–6	5–8	8–5	6–6	7–5	7–6	4–9	6–6	7–5	5–8
Cincinnati	5–7	8–5	—	7–6	3–9	7–6	4–8	3–9	6–6	10–2	5–8	9–3	9–4	5–8
Colorado	7–5	7–5	6–7	—	5–8	8–5	6–7	3–9	7–5	6–6	7–5	8–5	5–8	8–4
Florida	7–6	6–6	9–3	8–5	—	7–5	6–7	5–8	7–6	6–7	5–7	3–9	5–7	6–6
Houston	6–6	8–5	6–7	5–8	5–7	—	6–6	4–9	8–4	10–2	8–5	6–6	8–4	2–11
Los Angeles	7–5	5–8	8–4	7–6	7–6	6–6	—	9–3	8–4	7–6	6–6	5–8	7–6	8–4
Montreal	3–10	6–6	9–3	9–3	8–5	9–4	3–9	—	7–6	6–7	7–5	4–8	9–4	8–4
New York	6–7	5–7	6–6	5–7	6–7	4–8	4–8	6–7	—	7–6	8–5	3–10	6–6	5–7
Philadelphia	4–9	6–7	2–10	6–6	7–6	2–10	6–7	7–6	6–7	—	7–5	4–8	6–6	4–8
Pittsburgh	3–9	9–4	8–5	5–7	7–5	5–8	6–6	5–7	5–8	5–7	—	4–9	8–4	3–10
San Diego	4–9	6–6	3–9	5–8	9–3	6–6	8–5	8–4	10–3	8–4	9–4	—	11–2	4–8
San Francisco	5–7	5–7	4–9	8–5	7–5	4–8	6–7	4–9	6–6	6–6	4–8	2–11	—	7–6
St. Louis	4–9	8–5	8–5	4–8	6–6	11–2	4–8	4–8	7–5	8–4	10–3	8–4	6–7	—

=== Game log ===
1996 Game Log: 68–94 (Home: 38–44; Away: 30–50)
April: 14–12 (Home: 6–6; Away: 8–6)

#	Date	Opponent	Score	Win	Loss	Save	Attendance	Record
1	April 1	@ Braves	8–10	Maddux	**Leiter** (0–1)	Borbon	48,961	0–1
2	April 3	@ Braves	2–15	Glavine	**VanLandingham** (0–1)	—	28,728	0–2
3	April 4	@ Braves	7–1	**Watson** (1–0)	Smoltz	—	30,271	1–2
4	April 5	@ Marlins	7–1	**Fernandez** (1–0)	Rapp	—	24,769	2–2
5	April 6	@ Marlins	0–1 (10)	Nen	**Dewey** (0–1)	—	34,002	2–3
6	April 7	@ Marlins	14–7	**Bourgeois** (1–0)	Burkett	—	19,842	3–3
7	April 8	@ Astros	2–6	Hampton	**VanLandingham** (0–2)	—	13,488	3–4
8	April 9	@ Astros	3–1 (10)	**Juden** (1–0)	Tabaka	**Beck** (1)	13,588	4–4
9	April 10	@ Astros	11–5	**Fernandez** (2–0)	Kile	—	14,183	5–4
10	April 12	Cubs	4–1	**Leiter** (1–1)	Navarro	**Beck** (2)	45,589	6–4
11	April 13	Cubs	3–2 (10)	**Juden** (2–0)	Myers	—	22,120	7–4
12	April 14	Cubs	2–6	Foster	**Watson** (1–1)	Wendell	23,137	7–5
13	April 16	Dodgers	5–3	**Dewey** (1–1)	Osuna	**Beck** (3)	19,716	8–5
14	April 17	Dodgers	2–11	Osuna	**Leiter** (1–2)	—	17,039	8–6
15	April 18	@ Cubs	6–7	Perez	**VanLandingham** (0–3)	Wendell	15,857	8–7
16	April 19	@ Cubs	6–10	Foster	**Watson** (1–2)	—	17,662	8–8
17	April 20	@ Cubs	8–4	**Gardner** (1–0)	Bullinger	—	28,047	9–8
18	April 21	@ Cubs	7–6	**Fernandez** (3–0)	Trachsel	**Beck** (4)	28,065	10–8
19	April 22	Astros	8–11	Reynolds	**Leiter** (1–3)	—	8,867	10–9
20	April 23	Astros	4–8	Kile	**VanLandingham** (0–4)	—	8,439	10–10
21	April 24	Braves	3–8	Smoltz	**Watson** (1–3)	—	13,296	10–11
22	April 25	Braves	8–0	**Gardner** (2–0)	Schmidt	—	12,436	11–11
23	April 26	Marlins	0–3	Brown	**Fernandez** (3–1)	—	12,461	11–12
24	April 27	Marlins	6–3	**Leiter** (2–3)	Burkett	**Beck** (5)	15,711	12–12
25	April 28	Marlins	10–4	**VanLandingham** (1–4)	Hammond	—	23,535	13–12
26	April 30	@ Padres	9–4	**Watson** (2–3)	Tewksbury	—	14,170	14–12

May: 12–14 (Home: 5–7; Away: 7–7)

#	Date	Opponent	Score	Win	Loss	Save	Attendance	Record
27	May 1	@ Padres	4–9	Valenzuela	**Gardner** (2–1)	—	14,878	14–13
28	May 3	Reds	3–5	McElroy	**Creek** (0–1)	Brantley	12,884	14–14
29	May 4	Reds	7–9	Moore	**Leiter** (2–4)	Brantley	18,989	14–15
30	May 5	Reds	6–12	Smiley	**VanLandingham** (1–5)	—	18,052	14–16
31	May 7	@ Cardinals	4–2	**Watson** (3–3)	Fossas	**Beck** (6)	23,492	15–16
32	May 8	@ Cardinals	10–7	**Gardner** (3–1)	Benes	**Beck** (7)	22,517	16–16
33	May 9	@ Cardinals	8–16	Parrett	**Dewey** (1–2)	—	37,920	16–17
34	May 10	@ Pirates	5–4 (10)	**DeLucia** (1–0)	Cordova	**Beck** (8)	17,611	17–17
35	May 11	@ Pirates	12–7	**VanLandingham** (2–5)	Hope	—	16,591	18–17
36	May 12	@ Pirates	7–2	**Watson** (4–3)	Smith	—	17,132	19–17
37	May 13	@ Phillies	2–1	**Gardner** (4–1)	Fernandez	**Beck** (9)	18,758	20–17
38	May 14	@ Phillies	0–7	Schilling	**Fernandez** (3–2)	—	18,774	20–18
39	May 15	@ Phillies	6–7 (10)	Bottalico	**Beck** (0–1)	—	25,085	20–19
40	May 18	Mets	5–14	Clark	**VanLandingham** (2–6)	—	15,298	20–20
41	May 19	Mets	1–0	**Watson** (5–3)	Isringhausen	**Beck** (10)	—	21–20
42	May 19	Mets	6–2	**Gardner** (5–1)	Wilson	—	22,959	22–20
43	May 20	Expos	9–6	**Dewey** (2–2)	Dyer	**Beck** (11)	10,062	23–20
44	May 21	Expos	8–5	**Dewey** (3–2)	Aucoin	**Beck** (12)	8,911	24–20
45	May 22	Expos	3–4	Martinez	**VanLandingham** (2–7)	Rojas	11,663	24–21
46	May 24	Phillies	1–5	Schilling	**Watson** (5–4)	—	11,917	24–22
47	May 25	Phillies	3–2	**Gardner** (6–1)	Williams	**Beck** (13)	16,874	25–22
48	May 26	Phillies	1–10	Mulholland	**Fernandez** (3–3)	Bottalico	26,234	25–23
49	May 28	@ Mets	0–4	Clark	**Leiter** (2–5)	Henry	15,733	25–24
50	May 29	@ Mets	4–2	**VanLandingham** (3–7)	Isringhausen	**Beck** (14)	15,578	26–24
51	May 30	@ Mets	0–1	Wilson	**Watson** (5–5)	Franco	15,781	26–25
52	May 31	@ Expos	4–7	Daal	**DeLucia** (1–1)	Veres	25,712	26–26

June: 10–17 (Home: 7–9; Away: 3–8)

#	Date	Opponent	Score	Win	Loss	Save	Attendance	Record
53	June 1	@ Expos	1–5	Fassero	**Fernandez** (3–4)	Dyer	36,858	26–27
54	June 2	@ Expos	8–1	**Leiter** (3–5)	Martinez	—	25,006	27–27
55	June 3	@ Reds	6–3	**VanLandingham** (4–7)	Burba	—	20,028	28–27
56	June 4	@ Reds	1–4	Salkeld	**Watson** (5–6)	Brantley	28,549	28–28
57	June 5	@ Reds	15–4	**Gardner** (7–1)	Jarvis	—	21,881	29–28
58	June 7	Cardinals	4–9	Benes	**Fernandez** (3–5)	—	13,009	29–29
59	June 8	Cardinals	4–1	**DeLucia** (2–1)	Stottlemyre	**Beck** (15)	20,401	30–29
60	June 9	Cardinals	9–0	**Watson** (6–6)	Benes	—	24,176	31–29
61	June 10	Pirates	4–5	Morel	**DeLucia** (2–2)	Cordova	10,026	31–30
62	June 11	Pirates	2–7	Neagle	**Fernandez** (3–6)	—	11,530	31–31
63	June 13	Astros	12–8	**Leiter** (4–5)	Kile	—	10,527	32–31
64	June 14	Astros	1–9	Hampton	**VanLandingham** (4–8)	Wagner	10,758	32–32
65	June 15	Astros	3–4	Wall	**Watson** (6–7)	Jones	18,530	32–33
66	June 16	Astros	8–7	**DeLucia** (3–2)	Morman	—	27,624	33–33
67	June 17	Marlins	1–0	**Fernandez** (4–6)	Leiter	**Beck** (16)	9,524	34–33
68	June 18	Marlins	9–8 (15)	**Juden** (3–0)	Rapp	—	15,439	35–33
69	June 19	Marlins	7–4 (15)	**Bautista** (1–0)	Mathews	—	13,274	36–33
70	June 21	@ Braves	7–8 (11)	Wade	**Beck** (0–2)	—	38,432	36–34
71	June 22	@ Braves	0–6	Maddux	**Gardner** (7–2)	—	49,365	36–35
72	June 23	@ Braves	0–1	Glavine	**Fernandez** (4–7)	Wohlers	35,645	36–36
73	June 24	@ Marlins	1–2	Burkett	**Leiter** (4–6)	Nen	16,860	36–37
74	June 25	@ Marlins	4–5 (10)	Powell	**Beck** (0–3)	—	16,577	36–38
75	June 26	@ Marlins	2–3	Brown	**Watson** (6–8)	—	21,188	36–39
76	June 27	Padres	1–11	Valenzuela	**Gardner** (7–3)	—	12,325	36–40
77	June 28	Padres	1–6	Ashby	**Fernandez** (4–8)	Hoffman	13,129	36–41
78	June 29	Padres	6–7	Blair	**Beck** (0–4)	Hoffman	24,540	36–42
79	June 30	Padres	4–7	Tewksbury	**VanLandingham** (4–9)	Hoffman	26,373	36–43

July: 10–17 (Home: 8–6; Away: 2–11)

#	Date	Opponent	Score	Win	Loss	Save	Attendance	Record
80	July 1	Rockies	9–6	**Juden** (4–0)	Painter	**Beck** (17)	16,142	37–43
81	July 2	Rockies	5–1	**Gardner** (8–3)	Ritz	—	13,571	38–43
82	July 3	Rockies	2–3	Leskanic	**Beck** (0–5)	Ruffin	44,356	38–44
83	July 4	@ Padres	4–8	Tewksbury	**Leiter** (4–7)	—	14,111	38–45
84	July 5	@ Padres	6–7 (11)	Bergman	**Bautista** (1–1)	—	22,589	38–46
85	July 6	@ Padres	3–7	Worrell	**Bourgeois** (1–1)	Hoffman	51,021	38–47
86	July 7	@ Padres	3–10	Valenzuela	**Fernandez** (4–9)	—	32,693	38–48
87	July 11	@ Dodgers	3–8	Martinez	**Leiter** (4–8)	—	37,305	38–49
88	July 12	@ Dodgers	1–6	Valdez	**Fernandez** (4–10)	—	44,569	38–50
89	July 13	@ Dodgers	7–0	**Estes** (1–0)	Nomo	—	54,226	39–50
90	July 14	@ Dodgers	6–0	**VanLandingham** (5–9)	Park	—	42,862	40–50
91	July 15	@ Rockies	3–7	Bailey	**Bourgeois** (1–2)	—	48,032	40–51
92	July 16	@ Rockies	3–5	Freeman	**Leiter** (4–9)	Ruffin	49,035	40–52
93	July 17	@ Rockies	3–4	Wright	**Fernandez** (4–11)	Ruffin	48,453	40–53
94	July 18	Dodgers	3–8	Nomo	**Estes** (1–1)	—	28,072	40–54
95	July 19	Dodgers	5–4	**VanLandingham** (6–9)	Candiotti	**Beck** (18)	27,562	41–54
96	July 20	Dodgers	7–6	**Bautista** (2–1)	Worrell	—	50,014	42–54
97	July 21	Dodgers	6–7	Osuna	**DeLucia** (3–3)	Worrell	36,345	42–55
98	July 22	Cubs	3–2	**Bautista** (3–1)	Bottenfield	—	12,902	43–55
99	July 23	Cubs	6–9	Myers	**DeLucia** (3–4)	Patterson	15,878	43–56
100	July 24	Cubs	1–7	Castillo	**VanLandingham** (6–10)	—	13,695	43–57
101	July 25	Braves	4–3	**Watson** (7–8)	Maddux	**Beck** (19)	16,871	44–57
102	July 26	Braves	1–2	Glavine	**Leiter** (4–10)	Wohlers	17,560	44–58
103	July 27	Braves	7–5	**Gardner** (9–3)	Woodall	**Beck** (20)	38,761	45–58
104	July 28	Braves	10–3	**Estes** (2–1)	Smoltz	**Beck** (21)	34,525	46–58
105	July 30	@ Cubs	0–4	Castillo	**VanLandingham** (6–11)	Adams	37,424	46–59
106	July 31	@ Cubs	1–4	Trachsel	**Watson** (7–9)	Wendell	28,988	46–60

August: 12–15 (Home: 6–7; Away: 6–8)

#	Date	Opponent	Score	Win	Loss	Save	Attendance	Record
107	August 2	@ Astros	1–5	Drabek	**Gardner** (9–4)	Hernandez	22,682	46–61
108	August 3	@ Astros	1–4	Reynolds	**Estes** (2–2)	—	35,930	46–62
109	August 4	@ Astros	6–7	Hampton	**Fernandez** (4–12)	Wagner	33,646	46–63
110	August 5	Reds	3–4	Salkeld	**VanLandingham** (6–12)	Brantley	12,277	46–64
111	August 6	Reds	2–3	Carrasco	**Beck** (0–6)	Brantley	12,434	46–65
112	August 7	Reds	9–2	**Gardner** (10–4)	Jarvis	—	15,829	47–65
113	August 8	@ Cardinals	5–3 (10)	**Poole** (1–0)	Honeycutt	**Beck** (22)	34,844	48–65
114	August 9	@ Cardinals	8–6	**Fernandez** (5–12)	Morgan	**Beck** (23)	30,118	49–65
115	August 10	@ Cardinals	1–7	Benes	**VanLandingham** (6–13)	—	49,344	49–66
116	August 11	@ Cardinals	3–5	Osborne	**Watson** (7–10)	Eckersley	30,139	49–67
117	August 13	@ Pirates	12–10	**Dewey** (4–2)	Plesac	**Beck** (24)	11,378	50–67
118	August 14	@ Pirates	3–4	Peters	**Estes** (2–3)	Ericks	20,340	50–68
119	August 16	@ Phillies	6–4	**VanLandingham** (7–13)	Williams	**Beck** (25)	20,163	51–68
120	August 17	@ Phillies	8–4	**Watson** (8–10)	Hunter	**Beck** (26)	24,522	52–68
121	August 18	@ Phillies	6–7	Borland	**Gardner** (10–5)	Bottalico	24,480	52–69
122	August 19	Mets	5–4	**Scott** (1–0)	Harnisch	**Beck** (27)	11,565	53–69
123	August 20	Mets	3–7	Jones	**Fernandez** (5–13)	Franco	10,885	53–70
124	August 21	Mets	12–11	**Dewey** (5–2)	Person	**Beck** (28)	11,473	54–70
125	August 22	Expos	4–5	Fassero	**Bautista** (3–2)	Rojas	14,744	54–71
126	August 23	Expos	8–10	Daal	**Creek** (0–2)	Rojas	18,739	54–72
127	August 24	Expos	0–3	Martinez	**Estes** (2–4)	Rojas	22,710	54–73
128	August 25	Expos	7–2	**Fernandez** (6–13)	Cormier	—	24,349	55–73
129	August 26	Phillies	1–0	**VanLandingham** (8–13)	Schilling	**Beck** (29)	8,640	56–73
130	August 27	Phillies	2–3	Williams	**Bautista** (3–3)	Bottalico	9,549	56–74
131	August 28	Phillies	7–6	**Dewey** (6–2)	Jordan	**Beck** (30)	16,223	57–74
132	August 30	@ Mets	6–4	**Estes** (3–4)	Harnisch	**Beck** (31)	17,581	58–74
133	August 31	@ Mets	2–7	Person	**Scott** (1–1)	Henry	23,636	58–75

September: 10–19 (Home: 6–9; Away: 4–10)

#	Date	Opponent	Score	Win	Loss	Save	Attendance	Record
134	September 1	@ Mets	5–6 (10)	Franco	**Beck** (0–7)	—	40,643	58–76
135	September 2	@ Expos	3–4 (11)	Manuel	**Beck** (0–8)	—	26,689	58–77
136	September 3	@ Expos	2–9	Martinez	**Gardner** (10–6)	—	20,168	58–78
137	September 4	@ Expos	0–6	Paniagua	**Estes** (3–5)	—	20,317	58–79
138	September 6	@ Reds	2–0	**Fernandez** (7–13)	Smiley	**Beck** (32)	—	59–79
139	September 6	@ Reds	1–14	Morgan	**Bourgeois** (1–3)	—	23,091	59–80
140	September 7	@ Reds	5–7	Salkeld	**Scott** (1–2)	Brantley	22,790	59–81
141	September 8	@ Reds	3–8	Shaw	**Bautista** (3–4)	—	20,838	59–82
142	September 9	Cardinals	2–6	Benes	**Gardner** (10–7)	—	10,307	59–83
143	September 10	Cardinals	0–1	Petkovsek	**Rueter** (0–1)	Eckersley	8,770	59–84
144	September 11	Cardinals	4–2	**Scott** (2–2)	Benes	**Beck** (33)	9,673	60–84
145	September 12	Pirates	4–10	Schmidt	**Dewey** (6–3)	Boever	8,214	60–85
146	September 13	Pirates	0–9	Loaiza	**VanLandingham** (8–14)	—	9,888	60–86
147	September 14	Pirates	5–7 (12)	Ericks	**Hook** (0–1)	Boever	15,685	60–87
148	September 15	Pirates	1–4	Lieber	**Rueter** (0–2)	Ruebel	—	60–88
149	September 15	Pirates	9–11 (10)	Wilkins	**Poole** (1–1)	—	21,998	60–89
150	September 16	Padres	1–2 (11)	Hoffman	**Beck** (0–9)	—	8,853	60–90
151	September 17	Padres	9–7	**Poole** (2–1)	Veras	**Beck** (34)	12,737	61–90
152	September 18	Padres	5–8	Bochtler	**DeLucia** (3–5)	Hoffman	11,996	61–91
153	September 19	Rockies	11–4	**VanLandingham** (9–14)	Ritz	—	10,994	62–91
154	September 20	Rockies	6–2	**Gardner** (11–7)	Thompson	—	15,734	63–91
155	September 21	Rockies	6–2	**Rueter** (1–2)	Wright	—	30,002	64–91
156	September 22	Rockies	7–3	**Soderstrom** (1–0)	Nied	—	30,826	65–91
157	September 24	@ Dodgers	2–6	Martinez	**Watson** (8–11)	—	37,448	65–92
158	September 25	@ Dodgers	5–7	Radinsky	**DeLucia** (3–6)	Worrell	42,405	65–93
159	September 26	@ Dodgers	6–1	**Gardner** (12–7)	Candiotti	—	38,893	66–93
160	September 27	@ Rockies	9–3	**Soderstrom** (2–0)	Nied	—	48,009	67–93
161	September 28	@ Rockies	8–5	**Carlson** (1–0)	Burke	**Beck** (35)	48,042	68–93
162	September 29	@ Rockies	3–12	Ritz	**Watson** (8–12)	—	48,162	68–94

Legend: = Win = Loss
Bold = Giants team member

=== Detailed records ===
National League
Opponent	W	L	WP	RS	RA
NL East
Atlanta Braves	5	7	0.417	57	62
Florida Marlins	7	5	0.583	61	41
Montreal Expos	4	9	0.308	57	67
New York Mets	6	6	0.500	49	62
Philadelphia Phillies	6	6	0.500	43	56
Total	28	33	0.459	267	288
NL Central
Chicago Cubs	5	7	0.417	47	62
Cincinnati Reds	4	9	0.308	63	75
Houston Astros	4	8	0.333	60	75
Pittsburgh Pirates	4	8	0.333	64	80
St. Louis Cardinals	7	6	0.538	62	65
Total	24	38	0.387	296	357
NL West
Colorado Rockies	8	5	0.615	75	57
Los Angeles Dodgers	6	7	0.462	58	67
San Diego Padres	2	11	0.154	56	93
**San Francisco Giants**					
Total	16	23	0.410	189	217
Season Total	68	94	0.420	752	862

Month	Games	Won	Lost	Win %	RS	RA
April	26	14	12	0.538	145	138
May	26	12	14	0.462	119	150
June	27	10	17	0.370	121	135
July	27	10	17	0.370	112	136
August	27	12	15	0.444	131	137
September	29	10	19	0.345	124	166
Total	162	68	94	0.420	752	862

	Games	Won	Lost	Win %	RS	RA
Home	82	38	44	0.463	386	431
Away	80	30	50	0.375	366	431
Total	162	68	94	0.420	752	862

=== Notable transactions ===
- April 5, 1996: Steve Decker was signed as a free agent by the Giants.
- July 11, 1996: Jeff Juden was selected off waivers from the Giants by the Montreal Expos.
- July 27, 1996: Kirt Manwaring was traded by the Giants to the Houston Astros for Rick Wilkins and cash.
- July 30, 1996: Mark Leiter was traded by the Giants to the Montreal Expos for Kirk Rueter and Tim Scott.
- August 21, 1996: Steve Decker was purchased from the Giants by the Colorado Rockies.
- August 21, 1996: Trenidad Hubbard was selected off waivers by the San Francisco Giants from the Colorado Rockies.

=== Lou Seal ===
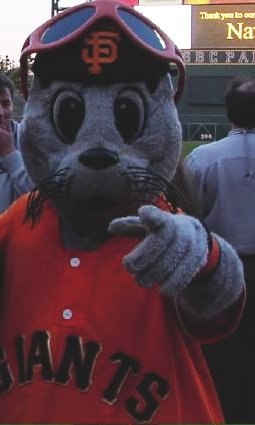
Lou Seal has served as mascot of the San Francisco Giants since 1996.

Lou Seal is the official mascot of the San Francisco Giants. "Born" on July 25, 1996, Luigi Francisco Seal has been a regular part of the Giants baseball home games and events around San Francisco, and the United States. The name is a play on the name "Lucille." Todd Schwenk, an Oakland Athletics Fan, named the mascot in a KNBR Sports Radio phone-in contest. Schwenk named Lou for the Seals always hanging out on the wharfs at Fisherman's Wharf. It also refers to the San Francisco Seals, the baseball club which was a mainstay of the Pacific Coast League from 1903 until 1957.

=== Roster ===
1996 San Francisco Giants
**Roster**
**Pitchers**: 42 Shawn Barton; 38 José Bautista; 47 Rod Beck; 33 Steve Bourgeois; 29 Dan Carlson; 51 Doug Creek; 41 Rich DeLucia; 40 Mark Dewey; 55 Shawn Estes; 22 Osvaldo Fernández; 26 Mark Gardner; 37 Chris Hook; 14 Jeff Juden; 31 Mark Leiter; 19 Jim Poole; 42 Kirk Rueter; 54 Tim Scott; 65 Steve Soderstrom; 50 William Van Landingham; 34 Allen Watson	**Catchers**: 29 Steve Decker; 30 Marcus Jensen; 49 Tom Lampkin; 8 Kirt Manwaring; 66 Doug Mirabelli; 2 Rick Wilkins; **Infielders**: 35 Rich Aurilia; 18 Kim Batiste; 36 Jay Canizaro; 45 Mark Carreon; 60 Wilson Delgado; 21 Shawon Dunston; 10 David McCarty; 32 Bill Mueller; 30 Dan Peltier; 17 J. R. Phillips; 23 Steve Scarsone; 6 Robby Thompson; 9 Matt Williams; 8 Desi Wilson	**Outfielders**: 7 Marvin Benard; 25 Barry Bonds; 62 Jacob Cruz; 2 Mel Hall; 1 Glenallen Hill; 14 Trent Hubbard; 28 Stan Javier; 52 Dax Jones; 42 Keith Williams	**Manager**: 12 Dusty Baker; **Coaches**: 16 Bobby Bonds (Hitting); 15 Bob Brenly (First Base); 20 Wendell Kim (Third Base); 5 Bob Lillis (Bench); 48 Dick Pole (Pitching)

== Player stats ==
= Indicates team leader

=== Batting ===
==== Starters by position ====
Note: Pos = Position; G = Games played; AB = At bats; H = Hits; Avg. = Batting average; HR = Home runs; RBI = Runs batted in

Pos	Player	G	AB	H	Avg.	HR	RBI
C	Tom Lampkin	66	177	41	.232	6	29
1B	Mark Carreon	81	292	76	.260	9	51
2B	Steve Scarsone	105	283	62	.219	5	23
3B	Matt Williams	105	404	122	.302	22	85
SS	Rich Aurilia	105	318	76	.239	3	26
LF	Barry Bonds	158	517	159	.308	42	129
CF	Marvin Benard	135	488	121	.248	5	27
RF	Glenallen Hill	98	379	106	.280	19	67

==== Other batters ====
Note: G = Games played; AB = At bats; H = Hits; Avg. = Batting average; HR = Home runs; RBI = Runs batted in

Player	G	AB	H	Avg.	HR	RBI
Shawon Dunston	82	287	86	.300	5	25
Stan Javier	71	274	74	.270	2	22
Robby Thompson	63	227	48	.211	5	21
Bill Mueller	55	200	66	.330	0	19
Dave McCarty	91	175	38	.217	6	24
Rick Wilkins	52	157	46	.293	8	36
Kirt Manwaring	49	145	34	.234	1	14
Kim Batiste	54	130	27	.208	3	11
Steve Decker	57	122	28	.230	1	12
Jay Canizaro	43	120	24	.200	2	8
Desi Wilson	41	118	32	.271	2	12
Jacob Cruz	33	77	18	.234	3	10
Dan Peltier	31	59	15	.254	0	9
Dax Jones	34	58	10	.172	1	7
Trent Hubbard	10	29	6	.207	1	2
Mel Hall	25	25	3	.120	0	5
J.R. Phillips	15	25	5	.200	2	5
Wilson Delgado	6	22	8	.364	0	2
Keith Williams	9	20	5	.250	0	0
Marcus Jensen	9	19	4	.211	0	4
Doug Mirabelli	9	18	4	.222	0	1

=== Pitching ===
==== Starting pitchers ====
Note: G = Games pitched; IP = Innings pitched; W = Wins; L = Losses; ERA = Earned run average; SO = Strikeouts

Player	G	IP	W	L	ERA	SO
Allen Watson	29	185.2	8	12	4.61	128
William Van Landingham	32	181.2	9	14	5.40	97
Mark Gardner	30	179.1	12	7	4.42	145
Osvaldo Fernández	30	171.2	7	13	4.61	106
Mark Leiter	23	135.1	4	10	5.19	118
Shawn Estes	11	70.0	3	5	3.60	60
Kirk Rueter	4	23.1	1	2	1.93	16
Steve Soderstrom	3	13.2	2	0	5.27	9

==== Other pitchers ====
Note: G = Games pitched; IP = Innings pitched; W = Wins; L = Losses; ERA = Earned run average; SO = Strikeouts

Player	G	IP	W	L	ERA	SO
Steve Bourgeois	15	40.0	1	3	6.30	17

==== Relief pitchers ====
Note: G = Games pitched; W = Wins; L = Losses; SV = Saves; ERA = Earned run average; SO = Strikeouts

Player	G	W	L	SV	ERA	SO
Rod Beck	63	0	9	35	3.34	48
Mark Dewey	78	6	3	0	4.21	57
Doug Creek	63	0	2	0	6.52	38
Rich DeLucia	56	3	6	0	5.84	55
José Bautista	37	3	4	0	3.36	28
Jeff Juden	36	4	0	0	4.10	35
Jim Poole	35	2	1	0	2.66	19
Tim Scott	20	2	2	0	8.24	10
Chris Hook	10	0	1	0	7.43	4
Shawn Barton	7	0	0	0	9.72	3
Dan Carlson	5	1	0	0	2.70	4

== Awards and honors ==
- Shawon Dunston SS, Willie Mac Award

All-Star Game

== Farm system ==
Level	Team	League	Manager
AAA	Phoenix Firebirds	Pacific Coast League	Ron Wotus
AA	Shreveport Captains	Texas League	Frank Cacciatore
A	San Jose Giants	California League	Carlos Lezcano
A	Burlington Bees	Midwest League	Glenn Tufts
A-Short Season	Bellingham Giants	Northwest League	Ozzie Virgil, Sr., and Shane Turner
