= 1996 Montreal Expos season =

1996 Montreal Expos
- League: National League
- Division: East
- Ballpark: Olympic Stadium
- City: Montreal
- Record: 88–74
- Divisional place: 2nd
- Owners: Claude Brochu
- General managers: Jim Beattie
- Managers: Felipe Alou
- Television: The Sports Network (Dave Van Horne, Ken Singleton) TQS (Michel Villeneuve, Marc Griffin); SRC (Claude Raymond, Camille Dube); RDS Network (Denis Casavant, Alain Chantelois)
- Radio: CIQC (Dave Van Horne, Ken Singleton, Elliott Price, Mike Stenhouse) CKAC (AM) (Jacques Doucet, Rodger Brulotte, Alain Chantelois)

The 1996 Montreal Expos season was the 28th season in franchise history. An 88–74 finish was good enough to put them in second in the National League East, 8 games behind the National League Champion Atlanta Braves and 2 games behind the Los Angeles Dodgers in the Wild Card standings.

== Offseason ==
- October 13, 1995: Butch Henry was selected off waivers by the Boston Red Sox from the Montreal Expos.
- December 1, 1995: Wally Whitehurst was signed as a free agent with the Montreal Expos.
- December 4, 1995: Jalal Leach was drafted by the Montreal Expos from the New York Yankees in the 1995 minor league draft.
- December 15, 1995: Omar Daal was traded by the Los Angeles Dodgers to the Montreal Expos for Rick Clelland (minors).
- December 20, 1995: Andy Stankiewicz signed as a free agent with the Montreal Expos.
- March 13, 1996: Rick Schu was signed as a free agent with the Montreal Expos.
- March 13, 1996: Sherman Obando was traded by the Baltimore Orioles to the Montreal Expos for Tony Tarasco.

== Spring training ==
The Expos held spring training at West Palm Beach Municipal Stadium in West Palm Beach, Florida – a facility they shared with the Atlanta Braves. It was their 20th season at the stadium; they had conducted spring training there from 1969 to 1972 and since 1981.

== Regular season ==
Opening Day (April 1) – Seven pitches into the first game of the season, at Riverfront Stadium in Cincinnati, home plate umpire John McSherry collapses on the field and dies of a massive heart attack. The game between the Cincinnati Reds and the Expos is postponed. Reds owner Marge Schott later comes under fire for wanting the game in Cincinnati to continue despite the tragedy (and against the wishes of the players on both teams), saying that she felt "cheated" when it was canceled.

The Expos set an MLB record with six grand slams before May 1, a feat not equaled until the 2018 Boston Red Sox.

Ultimately, the Expos finished two games behind the Los Angeles Dodgers in the National League wild card race.

=== Opening Day lineup ===
April 1 (game postponed)

- Mark Grudzielanek
- Mike Lansing
- Rondell White
- Pedro Martínez, P

April 2

- Mark Grudzielanek, SS
- Mike Lansing, 2B
- Rondell White, CF
- Moises Alou, LF
- David Segui, 1B
- Sherman Obando, RF
- Darrin Fletcher, C
- Shane Andrews, 3B
- Jeff Fassero, P

Note: sources do not list the complete Expos lineup for April 1, although it was likely the same (other than the pitcher) as for April 2, as the Reds use the same starting pitcher, left-hander Pete Schourek, on both days.

=== Season standings ===
NL East
Team	W	L	Pct.	GB	Home	Road
Atlanta Braves	96	66	.593	—	56‍–‍25	40‍–‍41
Montreal Expos	88	74	.543	8	50‍–‍31	38‍–‍43
Florida Marlins	80	82	.494	16	52‍–‍29	28‍–‍53
New York Mets	71	91	.438	25	42‍–‍39	29‍–‍52
Philadelphia Phillies	67	95	.414	29	35‍–‍46	32‍–‍49

=== Record vs. opponents ===
1996 National League record Source: MLB Standings Grid – 1996
Team	ATL	CHC	CIN	COL	FLA	HOU	LAD	MON	NYM	PHI	PIT	SD	SF	STL
Atlanta	—	7–5	7–5	5–7	6–7	6–6	5–7	10–3	7–6	9–4	9–3	9–4	7–5	9–4
Chicago	5–7	—	5–8	5–7	6–6	5–8	8–5	6–6	7–5	7–6	4–9	6–6	7–5	5–8
Cincinnati	5–7	8–5	—	7–6	3–9	7–6	4–8	3–9	6–6	10–2	5–8	9–3	9–4	5–8
Colorado	7–5	7–5	6–7	—	5–8	8–5	6–7	3–9	7–5	6–6	7–5	8–5	5–8	8–4
Florida	7–6	6–6	9–3	8–5	—	7–5	6–7	5–8	7–6	6–7	5–7	3–9	5–7	6–6
Houston	6–6	8–5	6–7	5–8	5–7	—	6–6	4–9	8–4	10–2	8–5	6–6	8–4	2–11
Los Angeles	7–5	5–8	8–4	7–6	7–6	6–6	—	9–3	8–4	7–6	6–6	5–8	7–6	8–4
Montreal	3–10	6–6	9–3	9–3	8–5	9–4	3–9	—	7–6	6–7	7–5	4–8	9–4	8–4
New York	6–7	5–7	6–6	5–7	6–7	4–8	4–8	6–7	—	7–6	8–5	3–10	6–6	5–7
Philadelphia	4–9	6–7	2–10	6–6	7–6	2–10	6–7	7–6	6–7	—	7–5	4–8	6–6	4–8
Pittsburgh	3–9	9–4	8–5	5–7	7–5	5–8	6–6	5–7	5–8	5–7	—	4–9	8–4	3–10
San Diego	4–9	6–6	3–9	5–8	9–3	6–6	8–5	8–4	10–3	8–4	9–4	—	11–2	4–8
San Francisco	5–7	5–7	4–9	8–5	7–5	4–8	6–7	4–9	6–6	6–6	4–8	2–11	—	7–6
St. Louis	4–9	8–5	8–5	4–8	6–6	11–2	4–8	4–8	7–5	8–4	10–3	8–4	6–7	—

=== Game log ===
1996 Game Log: 88–74 (Home: 50–31; Away: 38–43)
April: 17–9 (Home: 10–3; Away: 7–6)

#	Date	Opponent	Score	Win	Loss	Save	Attendance	Record
	April 1	@ Reds	Postponed (death of umpire John McSherry) Rescheduled for April 2					0–0
1	April 2	@ Reds	1–4	Schourek	**Fassero** (0–1)	Moore	53,136	0–1
2	April 3	@ Reds	8–4	**Veres** (1–0)	Shaw	—	19,104	1–1
3	April 4	@ Reds	10–2	**Paniagua** (1–0)	Burba	—	17,067	2–1
4	April 5	Rockies	6–4	**Dyer** (1–0)	Munoz	**Rojas** (1)	45,042	3–1
5	April 6	Rockies	4–5	Thompson	**Rueter** (0–1)	Leskanic	27,040	3–2
6	April 7	Rockies	9–1	**Fassero** (1–1)	Painter	—	11,212	4–2
7	April 8	@ Cardinals	4–3 (10)	**Rojas** (1–0)	Parrett	—	52,841	5–2
8	April 10	@ Cardinals	1–4	Benes	**Paniagua** (1–1)	—	27,734	5–3
9	April 11	@ Pirates	6–5 (11)	**Rojas** (2–0)	Cordova	**Veres** (1)	8,084	6–3
10	April 12	@ Pirates	13–3	**Rueter** (1–1)	Darwin	—	13,087	7–3
11	April 13	@ Pirates	3–9	Wagner	**Fassero** (1–2)	—	13,834	7–4
12	April 14	@ Pirates	2–5	Neagle	**Martinez** (0–1)	—	12,797	7–5
13	April 16	Phillies	7–6	**Rojas** (3–0)	Springer	—	8,510	8–5
14	April 17	Phillies	3–9	Mulholland	**Cormier** (0–1)	—	8,728	8–6
15	April 18	Phillies	8–9	Bottalico	**Rojas** (3–1)	—	8,316	8–7
16	April 19	Pirates	2–1	**Manuel** (1–0)	Plesac	—	13,256	9–7
17	April 20	Pirates	11–2	**Martinez** (1–1)	Ericks	—	14,022	10–7
18	April 21	Pirates	9–4	**Veres** (2–0)	Christiansen	—	11,361	11–7
19	April 22	Cardinals	8–0	**Cormier** (1–1)	Osborne	—	9,778	12–7
20	April 23	Cardinals	12–11	**Scott** (1–0)	Mathews	—	8,352	13–7
21	April 24	Reds	7–6 (10)	**Dyer** (2–0)	Moore	—	10,126	14–7
22	April 25	Reds	8–4	**Martinez** (2–1)	Smiley	—	13,067	15–7
23	April 26	@ Rockies	6–2	**Alvarez** (1–0)	Reynoso	—	48,024	16–7
24	April 27	@ Rockies	5–6 (13)	Painter	**Daal** (0–1)	—	48,013	16–8
25	April 28	@ Rockies	21–9	**Rueter** (2–1)	Rekar	—	48,006	17–8
26	April 29	@ Mets	2–3	Harnisch	**Fassero** (1–3)	Franco	14,011	17–9
	April 30	@ Mets	Postponed (rain) Rescheduled for May 1					17–9

May: 14–14 (Home: 8–6; Away: 6–8)

#	Date	Opponent	Score	Win	Loss	Save	Attendance	Record
27	May 1	@ Mets	4–0	**Martinez** (3–1)	Clark	—	—	18–9
28	May 1	@ Mets	0–6	Isringhausen	**Alvarez** (1–1)	—	16,937	18–10
29	May 3	@ Astros	1–4	Reynolds	**Cormier** (1–2)	Jones	19,633	18–11
30	May 4	@ Astros	2–1	**Veres** (3–0)	Hernandez	**Rojas** (2)	22,810	19–11
31	May 5	@ Astros	5–0	**Fassero** (2–3)	Brocail	—	25,207	20–11
32	May 6	Cubs	6–2	**Martinez** (4–1)	Bullinger	—	46,893	21–11
33	May 7	Cubs	8–3	**Veres** (4–0)	Adams	—	13,236	22–11
34	May 8	Cubs	4–2	**Cormier** (2–2)	Navarro	**Rojas** (3)	12,484	23–11
35	May 9	Astros	4–11	Kile	**Rueter** (2–2)	—	12,470	23–12
36	May 10	Astros	5–2	**Fassero** (3–3)	Dougherty	**Rojas** (4)	30,315	24–12
37	May 11	Astros	10–9 (13)	**Dyer** (3–0)	Dougherty	—	26,084	25–12
38	May 12	Astros	7–6	**Urbina** (1–0)	Hampton	**Rojas** (5)	19,345	26–12
39	May 13	@ Dodgers	3–2	**Manuel** (2–0)	Worrell	**Rojas** (6)	25,600	27–12
40	May 14	@ Dodgers	1–2	Martinez	**Veres** (4–1)	Worrell	37,942	27–13
41	May 15	@ Dodgers	2–7	Candiotti	**Fassero** (3–4)	—	26,875	27–14
42	May 17	@ Padres	1–2 (12)	Hoffman	**Rojas** (3–2)	—	26,469	27–15
43	May 18	@ Padres	3–2	**Urbina** (2–0)	Valenzuela	**Rojas** (7)	31,749	28–15
44	May 19	@ Padres	3–4	Worrell	**Veres** (4–2)	Hoffman	28,769	28–16
45	May 20	@ Giants	6–9	Dewey	**Dyer** (3–1)	Beck	10,062	28–17
46	May 21	@ Giants	5–8	Dewey	**Aucoin** (0–1)	Beck	8,911	28–18
47	May 22	@ Giants	4–3	**Martinez** (5–1)	VanLandingham	**Rojas** (8)	11,663	29–18
48	May 24	Dodgers	4–5 (11)	Osuna	**Daal** (0–2)	Worrell	27,843	29–19
49	May 25	Dodgers	3–5	Martinez	**Cormier** (2–3)	Worrell	27,104	29–20
50	May 26	Dodgers	3–4	Candiotti	**Rojas** (3–3)	Worrell	30,718	29–21
51	May 27	Padres	3–4	Hamilton	**Fassero** (3–5)	Hoffman	44,636	29–22
52	May 28	Padres	2–3 (10)	Hoffman	**Scott** (1–1)	Bochtler	16,537	29–23
53	May 29	Padres	9–4	**Urbina** (3–0)	Valenzuela	—	14,386	30–23
54	May 31	Giants	7–4	**Daal** (1–2)	DeLucia	**Veres** (2)	25,712	31–23

June: 16–10 (Home: 8–4; Away: 8–6)

#	Date	Opponent	Score	Win	Loss	Save	Attendance	Record
55	June 1	Giants	5–1	**Fassero** (4–5)	Fernandez	**Dyer** (1)	36,858	32–23
56	June 2	Giants	1–8	Leiter	**Martinez** (5–2)	—	25,006	32–24
57	June 4	@ Marlins	0–5	Burkett	**Rueter** (2–3)	—	14,821	32–25
58	June 5	@ Marlins	2–1	**Cormier** (3–3)	Rapp	**Veres** (3)	21,342	33–25
59	June 7	@ Cubs	9–3	**Fassero** (5–5)	Castillo	—	23,860	34–25
60	June 8	@ Cubs	4–6	Telemaco	**Martinez** (5–3)	Wendell	37,373	34–26
61	June 9	@ Cubs	2–4	Trachsel	**Rueter** (2–4)	Wendell	30,785	34–27
62	June 10	Marlins	2–5	Nen	**Dyer** (3–2)	—	34,867	34–28
63	June 11	Marlins	3–2	**Scott** (2–1)	Brown	**Veres** (4)	10,758	35–28
64	June 12	Marlins	8–0	**Fassero** (6–5)	Leiter	—	12,341	36–28
65	June 14	@ Reds	6–1	**Martinez** (6–3)	Portugal	—	26,691	37–28
66	June 15	@ Reds	6–5	**Rueter** (3–4)	Burba	**Rojas** (9)	32,833	38–28
67	June 16	@ Reds	0–7	Salkeld	**Cormier** (3–4)	—	25,657	38–29
68	June 17	@ Rockies	5–3	**Urbina** (4–0)	Freeman	**Rojas** (10)	48,021	39–29
69	June 18	@ Rockies	12–8	**Dyer** (4–2)	Holmes	—	50,025	40–29
70	June 19	@ Rockies	6–7 (10)	Ruffin	**Scott** (2–2)	—	48,007	40–30
71	June 20	Cardinals	8–3	**Rueter** (4–4)	Stottlemyre	—	15,095	41–30
72	June 21	Cardinals	4–3 (12)	**Rojas** (4–3)	Eckersley	—	16,136	42–30
73	June 22	Cardinals	4–9	Morgan	**Urbina** (4–1)	—	16,895	42–31
74	June 23	Cardinals	3–2	**Fassero** (7–5)	Osborne	**Rojas** (11)	22,168	43–31
75	June 24	Pirates	11–3	**Martinez** (7–3)	Dessens	—	23,736	44–31
76	June 25	Pirates	8–2	**Rueter** (5–4)	Smith	**Scott** (1)	12,776	45–31
77	June 26	Pirates	1–3	Darwin	**Cormier** (3–5)	Cordova	12,846	45–32
78	June 28	@ Phillies	3–7	Mulholland	**Urbina** (4–2)	Ryan	21,703	45–33
79	June 29	@ Phillies	1–0	**Fassero** (8–5)	Schilling	—	22,898	46–33
80	June 30	@ Phillies	6–5	**Rojas** (5–3)	Bottalico	**Dyer** (2)	24,949	47–33

July: 11–15 (Home: 6–8; Away: 5–7)

#	Date	Opponent	Score	Win	Loss	Save	Attendance	Record
81	July 1	Braves	2–7	Avery	**Rueter** (5–5)	—	34,116	47–34
82	July 2	Braves	5–1	**Cormier** (4–5)	Maddux	—	20,075	48–34
83	July 3	Braves	1–3	Glavine	**Scott** (2–3)	Wohlers	26,837	48–35
84	July 4	Mets	0–4	Person	**Fassero** (8–6)	—	11,861	48–36
85	July 5	Mets	6–9	Dipoto	**Scott** (2–4)	Franco	13,550	48–37
86	July 6	Mets	3–11	Jones	**Rueter** (5–6)	—	15,546	48–38
87	July 7	Mets	4–3	**Cormier** (5–5)	Harnisch	**Rojas** (12)	16,076	49–38
88	July 11	Phillies	2–3	Schilling	**Fassero** (8–7)	Bottalico	17,546	49–39
89	July 12	Phillies	3–5	Mulholland	**Martinez** (7–4)	—	14,322	49–40
90	July 13	Phillies	2–6	Mimbs	**Cormier** (5–6)	—	30,215	49–41
91	July 14	Phillies	5–2	**Scott** (3–4)	Williams	**Rojas** (13)	31,515	50–41
92	July 15	@ Braves	4–5	Maddux	**Manuel** (2–1)	Wohlers	32,708	50–42
93	July 16	@ Braves	2–3	Wohlers	**Scott** (3–5)	—	31,334	50–43
94	July 18	@ Mets	7–3	**Martinez** (8–4)	Harnisch	—	19,467	51–43
95	July 19	@ Mets	5–4	**Dyer** (5–2)	Isringhausen	**Rojas** (14)	19,005	52–43
96	July 20	@ Mets	1–4	Wilson	**Urbina** (4–3)	Franco	27,407	52–44
97	July 21	@ Mets	4–3	**Fassero** (9–7)	Clark	**Rojas** (15)	32,173	53–44
98	July 23	@ Pirates	1–5	Lieber	**Martinez** (8–5)	—	10,292	53–45
99	July 24	@ Pirates	4–5	Ericks	**Rojas** (5–4)	—	19,219	53–46
100	July 25	@ Cardinals	4–2	**Urbina** (5–3)	Petkovsek	**Rojas** (16)	34,271	54–46
101	July 26	@ Cardinals	5–1	**Fassero** (10–7)	Osborne	—	30,048	55–46
102	July 27	@ Cardinals	3–6	Benes	**Dyer** (5–3)	Eckersley	44,269	55–47
103	July 28	@ Cardinals	4–6	Petkovsek	**Martinez** (8–6)	Mathews	31,226	55–48
104	July 29	Rockies	4–1	**Cormier** (6–6)	Wright	**Rojas** (17)	19,115	56–48
105	July 30	Rockies	3–1	**Urbina** (6–3)	Reynoso	**Rojas** (18)	17,071	57–48
106	July 31	Rockies	6–2	**Fassero** (11–7)	Bailey	—	23,663	58–48

August: 14–14 (Home: 8–7; Away: 6–7)

#	Date	Opponent	Score	Win	Loss	Save	Attendance	Record
107	August 1	Reds	7–9	Shaw	**Dyer** (5–4)	Brantley	13,725	58–49
108	August 2	Reds	11–1	**Martinez** (9–6)	Jarvis	—	12,988	59–49
109	August 3	Reds	6–2	**Cormier** (7–6)	Portugal	**Rojas** (19)	17,184	60–49
110	August 4	Reds	7–3	**Urbina** (7–3)	Burba	**Rojas** (20)	15,408	61–49
111	August 6	@ Astros	7–5	**Fassero** (12–7)	Kile	**Rojas** (21)	17,658	62–49
112	August 7	@ Astros	13–5	**Leiter** (1–0)	Wall	—	19,703	63–49
113	August 8	@ Astros	2–6	Drabek	**Martinez** (9–7)	—	26,632	63–50
114	August 9	Cubs	9–11	Bullinger	**Cormier** (7–7)	Patterson	15,498	63–51
115	August 10	Cubs	2–3	Casian	**Dyer** (5–5)	Wendell	16,724	63–52
116	August 11	Cubs	4–3 (10)	**Rojas** (6–4)	Bottenfield	—	20,120	64–52
117	August 12	Astros	8–1	**Leiter** (2–0)	Darwin	—	35,458	65–52
118	August 13	Astros	7–4	**Martinez** (10–7)	Drabek	**Rojas** (22)	17,103	66–52
119	August 14	Astros	3–8	Reynolds	**Cormier** (7–8)	—	19,136	66–53
120	August 16	@ Dodgers	2–8	Astacio	**Urbina** (7–4)	—	51,573	66–54
121	August 17	@ Dodgers	6–7	Worrell	**Veres** (4–3)	—	47,549	66–55
122	August 18	@ Dodgers	7–3	**Leiter** (3–0)	Candiotti	—	36,673	67–55
123	August 19	@ Padres	3–7	Sanders	**Martinez** (10–8)	Hoffman	33,490	67–56
124	August 20	@ Padres	0–3	Tewksbury	**Cormier** (7–9)	Hoffman	18,426	67–57
125	August 21	@ Padres	2–7	Valenzuela	**Urbina** (7–5)	—	29,182	67–58
126	August 22	@ Giants	5–4	**Fassero** (13–7)	Bautista	**Rojas** (23)	14,744	68–58
127	August 23	@ Giants	10–8	**Daal** (2–2)	Creek	**Rojas** (24)	18,739	69–58
128	August 24	@ Giants	3–0	**Martinez** (11–8)	Estes	**Rojas** (25)	22,710	70–58
129	August 25	@ Giants	2–7	Fernandez	**Cormier** (7–10)	—	24,349	70–59
130	August 27	Dodgers	1–5	Nomo	**Fassero** (13–8)	—	21,040	70–60
131	August 28	Dodgers	6–5	**Rojas** (7–4)	Park	—	13,006	71–60
132	August 29	Dodgers	1–2	Martinez	**Martinez** (11–9)	Worrell	16,551	71–61
133	August 30	Padres	0–6	Sanders	**Paniagua** (1–2)	—	14,133	71–62
134	August 31	Padres	4–2	**Daal** (3–2)	Tewksbury	**Rojas** (26)	18,235	72–62

September: 16–12 (Home: 10–3; Away: 6–9)

#	Date	Opponent	Score	Win	Loss	Save	Attendance	Record
135	September 1	Padres	7–6	**Fassero** (14–8)	Ashby	**Rojas** (27)	20,666	73–62
136	September 2	Giants	4–3 (11)	**Manuel** (3–1)	Beck	—	26,689	74–62
137	September 3	Giants	9–2	**Martinez** (12–9)	Gardner	—	20,168	75–62
138	September 4	Giants	6–0	**Paniagua** (2–2)	Estes	—	20,317	76–62
139	September 5	@ Marlins	6–2	**Manuel** (4–1)	Rapp	—	16,080	77–62
140	September 6	@ Marlins	0–4	Hutton	**Fassero** (14–9)	Powell	16,943	77–63
141	September 7	@ Marlins	2–1	**Leiter** (4–0)	Valdes	**Rojas** (28)	25,278	78–63
142	September 8	@ Marlins	1–2	Helling	**Martinez** (12–10)	Nen	19,427	78–64
143	September 9	@ Cubs	1–3	Foster	**Paniagua** (2–3)	—	24,452	78–65
144	September 10	@ Cubs	3–10	Bottenfield	**Daal** (3–3)	—	26,700	78–66
145	September 11	@ Cubs	2–1	**Urbina** (8–5)	Adams	**Rojas** (29)	30,729	79–66
146	September 12	Marlins	5–4	**Veres** (5–3)	Powell	**Rojas** (30)	9,308	80–66
147	September 13	Marlins	3–2	**Martinez** (13–10)	Helling	**Rojas** (31)	13,723	81–66
148	September 14	Marlins	3–2	**Veres** (6–3)	Powell	**Rojas** (32)	17,546	82–66
149	September 15	Marlins	3–4	Leiter	**Daal** (3–4)	Nen	26,166	82–67
150	September 17	Mets	7–1	**Fassero** (15–9)	Isringhausen	—	17,282	83–67
151	September 18	Mets	4–3	**Urbina** (9–5)	Mlicki	**Rojas** (33)	14,930	84–67
152	September 19	@ Braves	5–1	**Urbina** (10–5)	Wohlers	—	37,193	85–67
153	September 20	@ Braves	2–3	Glavine	**Leiper** (0–1)	Wohlers	46,260	85–68
154	September 21	@ Braves	4–5	Neagle	**Daal** (3–5)	Wohlers	49,285	85–69
155	September 22	@ Braves	2–8	Smoltz	**Fassero** (15–10)	—	49,238	85–70
156	September 23	@ Braves	1–3	Maddux	**Leiter** (4–1)	Bielecki	49,083	85–71
157	September 24	@ Phillies	6–2	**Juden** (1–0)	Williams	**Rojas** (34)	16,044	86–71
158	September 25	@ Phillies	1–3	West	**Paniagua** (2–4)	Bottalico	17,544	86–72
159	September 26	@ Phillies	5–2	**Daal** (4–5)	Schilling	**Rojas** (35)	16,587	87–72
160	September 27	Braves	4–6	Smoltz	**Fassero** (15–11)	Wohlers	33,133	87–73
161	September 28	Braves	0–4	Woodall	**Leiter** (4–2)	—	34,125	87–74
162	September 29	Braves	6–3	**Alvarez** (2–1)	Avery	**Rojas** (36)	30,646	88–74

Legend: = Win = Loss
Bold = Expos team member

=== Detailed records ===
National League
Opponent	W	L	WP	RS	RA
NL East
Atlanta Braves	3	10	0.231	38	52
Florida Marlins	8	5	0.615	38	34
**Montreal Expos**					
New York Mets	7	6	0.538	47	54
Philadelphia Phillies	6	7	0.462	52	59
Total	24	28	0.462	175	199
NL Central
Chicago Cubs	6	6	0.500	54	51
Cincinnati Reds	9	3	0.750	77	48
Houston Astros	9	4	0.692	74	62
Pittsburgh Pirates	7	5	0.583	71	47
St. Louis Cardinals	8	4	0.667	60	50
Total	39	22	0.639	336	258
NL West
Colorado Rockies	9	3	0.750	87	49
Los Angeles Dodgers	3	9	0.250	39	55
San Diego Padres	4	8	0.333	37	50
San Francisco Giants	9	4	0.692	67	57
Total	25	24	0.510	230	211
Season Total	88	74	0.543	741	668

Month	Games	Won	Lost	Win %	RS	RA
April	26	17	9	0.654	176	121
May	28	14	14	0.500	115	114
June	26	16	10	0.615	120	103
July	26	11	15	0.423	90	105
August	28	14	14	0.500	138	135
September	28	16	12	0.571	102	90
Total	162	88	74	0.543	741	668

	Games	Won	Lost	Win %	RS	RA
Home	81	50	31	0.617	410	330
Away	81	38	43	0.469	331	338
Total	162	88	74	0.543	741	668

=== Transactions ===
- June 4, 1996: Milton Bradley was drafted by the Montreal Expos in the 2nd round of the 1996 amateur draft. Player signed July 1, 1996.
- June 12, 1996: Wally Whitehurst was selected off waivers by the New York Yankees from the Montreal Expos.
- June 25, 1996: Jon Habyan was signed as a free agent with the Montreal Expos.
- July 11, 1996: Jeff Juden was selected off waivers by the Montreal Expos from the San Francisco Giants.
- July 30, 1996: Kirk Rueter was traded by the Montreal Expos with Tim Scott to the San Francisco Giants for Mark Leiter.

=== Roster ===
1996 Montreal Expos
**Roster**
**Pitchers**: 48 Tavo Álvarez; 66 Derek Aucoin; 37 Rhéal Cormier; 47 Omar Daal; 39 Mike Dyer; 13 Jeff Fassero; 14,28 Jeff Juden; 52 Dave Leiper; 31 Mark Leiter; 44 Barry Manuel; 45 Pedro Martínez; 26 Alex Pacheco; 36 José Paniagua; 51 Mel Rojas; 42 Kirk Rueter; 54 Tim Scott; 41 Ugueth Urbina; 43 Dave Veres	**Catchers**: 12 Raúl Chávez; 24 Darrin Fletcher; 2 Tim Spehr; 25 Lenny Webster; **Infielders**: 11 Shane Andrews; 4 Mark Grudzielanek; 3 Mike Lansing; 16 Rick Schu; 21 David Segui; 9 Dave Silvestri; 5 Andy Stankiewicz	**Outfielders**: 18 Moisés Alou; 15 Yamil Benítez; 30 Cliff Floyd; 27 Vladimir Guerrero; 29 Sherman Obando; 40 Henry Rodríguez; 7 F. P. Santangelo; 22 Rondell White; **Other batters**: 46 Tony Barron; 16 Rob Lukachyk	**Manager**: 17 Felipe Alou; **Coaches**: 67 Pierre Arsenault (Bullpen); 1 Tommy Harper (Hitting); 32 Joe Kerrigan (Pitching); 6 Jerry Manuel (Third base); 55 Luis Pujols (First base); 23 Jim Tracy (Bench)

== Player stats ==
= Indicates team leader

=== Batting ===
==== Starters by position ====
Note: G = Games played; AB = At bats; R = Runs; H = Hits; HR = Home runs; RBI = Runs batted in; Avg. = Batting average; SB = Stolen bases

Pos	Player	G	AB	R	H	HR	RBI	Avg.	SB
C	Darrin Fletcher	127	394	41	105	12	57	.266	0
1B	David Segui	115	416	69	119	11	58	.286	4
2B	Mike Lansing	159	641	99	183	11	53	.285	23
SS	Shane Andrews	127	375	43	85	19	64	.227	3
3B	Mark Grudzielanek	153	657	99	201	6	49	.306	33
LF	Henry Rodríguez	145	532	81	147	36	103	.276	2
CF	Rondell White	88	334	35	98	6	41	.293	14
RF	Moisés Alou	143	540	87	152	21	96	.281	9

==== Other batters ====
Note: G = Games played; AB = At bats; R = Runs; H = Hits; HR = Home runs; RBI = Runs batted in; Avg. = Batting average; SB = Stolen bases

Player	G	AB	R	H	HR	RBI	Avg.	SB
F.P. Santangelo	152	393	54	109	7	56	.277	5
Cliff Floyd	117	227	29	55	6	26	.242	7
Sherman Obando	89	178	30	44	8	22	.247	2
Lenny Webster	78	174	18	40	2	17	.230	0
Dave Silvestri	86	162	16	33	1	17	.204	2
Andy Stankiewicz	64	77	12	22	0	9	.286	1
Tim Spehr	63	44	4	4	1	3	.091	1
Vladimir Guerrero	9	27	2	5	1	1	.185	0
Yamil Benítez	11	12	0	2	0	2	.167	0
Raúl Chávez	4	5	1	1	0	0	.200	1
Rick Schu	1	4	0	0	0	0	.000	0
Rob Lukachyk	2	2	0	0	0	0	.000	0
Tony Barron	1	1	0	0	0	0	.000	0

=== Pitching ===
==== Starting pitchers ====
Note: G = Games pitched; IP = Innings pitched; W = Wins; L = Losses; ERA = Earned run average; SO = Strikeouts; BB = Walks allowed

Player	G	IP	W	L	ERA	SO	BB
Jeff Fassero	34	231.2	15	11	3.30	222	55
Pedro Martínez	33	216.2	13	10	3.70	222	70
Rhéal Cormier	33	159.2	7	10	4.17	100	41
Ugueth Urbina	33	114.0	10	5	3.71	108	44
Kirk Rueter	16	78.2	5	6	4.58	30	22
Mark Leiter	12	69.2	4	2	4.39	46	19
José Paniagua	13	51.0	2	4	3.53	27	23

==== Other pitchers ====
Note: G = Games pitched; IP = Innings pitched; W = Wins; L = Losses; ERA = Earned run average; SO = Strikeouts; BB = Walks allowed

Player	G	IP	W	L	ERA	SO	BB
Jeff Juden	22	32.2	1	0	2.20	26	14
Tavo Álvarez	11	21.0	2	1	3.00	9	12
Alex Pacheco	5	5.2	0	0	11.12	7	1
Dave Leiper	7	4.0	0	1	11.25	3	2
Derek Aucoin	2	2.2	0	1	3.38	1	1

==== Relief pitchers ====
Note: G = Games pitched; IP = Innings pitched; W = Wins; L = Losses; SV = Saves; ERA = Earned run average; SO = Strikeouts; BB = Walks allowed

Player	G	IP	W	L	SV	ERA	SO	BB
Mel Rojas	74	81.0	7	4	36	3.22	92	28
Mike Dyer	70	75.2	5	5	2	4.40	51	34
Dave Veres	68	77.2	6	3	4	4.17	81	32
Omar Daal	64	87.1	4	5	0	4.02	82	37
Barry Manuel	53	86.0	4	1	0	3.24	62	26
Tim Scott	45	46.1	3	5	1	3.11	37	21

== Award winners ==
- Jeff Fassero, National League Pitcher of the Month, June
- Jeff Fassero, National League Pitcher of the Month, July

1996 Major League Baseball All-Star Game

- Pedro Martinez, Pitcher, Reserve
- Mark Grudzielanek, Infield, Reserve
- Henry Rodriguez, Outfield, Reservation

== Farm system ==
Level	Team	League	Manager
AAA	Ottawa Lynx	International League	Pete Mackanin
AA	Harrisburg Senators	Eastern League	Pat Kelly
A	West Palm Beach Expos	Florida State League	Rick Sofield
A	Delmarva Shorebirds	South Atlantic League	Doug Sisson
A-Short Season	Vermont Expos	New York–Penn League	Kevin Higgins
Rookie	GCL Expos	Gulf Coast League	Jim Gabella

LEAGUE CHAMPIONS: Harrisburg, Vermont
