= Kim Batiste =

American baseball player (1968–2020)

- Third baseman / Shortstop
- Born: March 15, 1968; New Orleans, Louisiana, U.S.
- Died: October 7, 2020 (aged 52); Baton Rouge, Louisiana, U.S.
- Batted: Right Threw: Right

MLB debut
- September 8, 1991, for the Philadelphia Phillies

Last MLB appearance
- September 28, 1996, for the San Francisco Giants

MLB statistics
- Batting average: .234
- Home runs: 10
- Runs batted in: 64
- Stats at Baseball Reference

Teams
- Philadelphia Phillies (1991–1994); San Francisco Giants (1996); Chinatrust Whales (1999)

Kimothy Emil Batiste (March 15, 1968 – October 7, 2020) was an American Major League Baseball infielder for the Philadelphia Phillies (1991–1994) and San Francisco Giants (1996), both of the National League. He was drafted in the third round of the 1987 amateur draft by the Phillies. His major league debut came in 1991 with the Phillies. He was a key component of the Phillies 1993 National League Championship Series victory, delivering a game-winning RBI hit in the 10th inning of Game 1, though it was his error in the 9th inning that allowed the Braves to tie the game and force extra innings.

Batiste played four seasons with the Phillies as a backup shortstop and third baseman, and was released on May 15, 1995. He signed with the Baltimore Orioles as a free agent nine days later on May 24 and was assigned to the Bowie Baysox. He had a 14-game hitting streak with the Baysox before being promoted to the Rochester Red Wings where he spent the duration of the campaign. He never appeared in a major league game with the Orioles and was selected by the Giants in the Rule 5 draft on December 4, 1995. He played one year with the Giants before being released on October 1, 1996. Batiste went on to play in the independent Atlantic League, batting .233 in 12 games in 2003 for the Atlantic City Surf in his final professional season.

Batiste lived in Baton Rouge, Louisiana after his retirement.

Batiste died on October 7, 2020, from complications after kidney surgery. He is interred at Mount Gillion Baptist Church Cemetery in nearby Prairieville.
