= Sherman Obando =

Panamanian baseball player

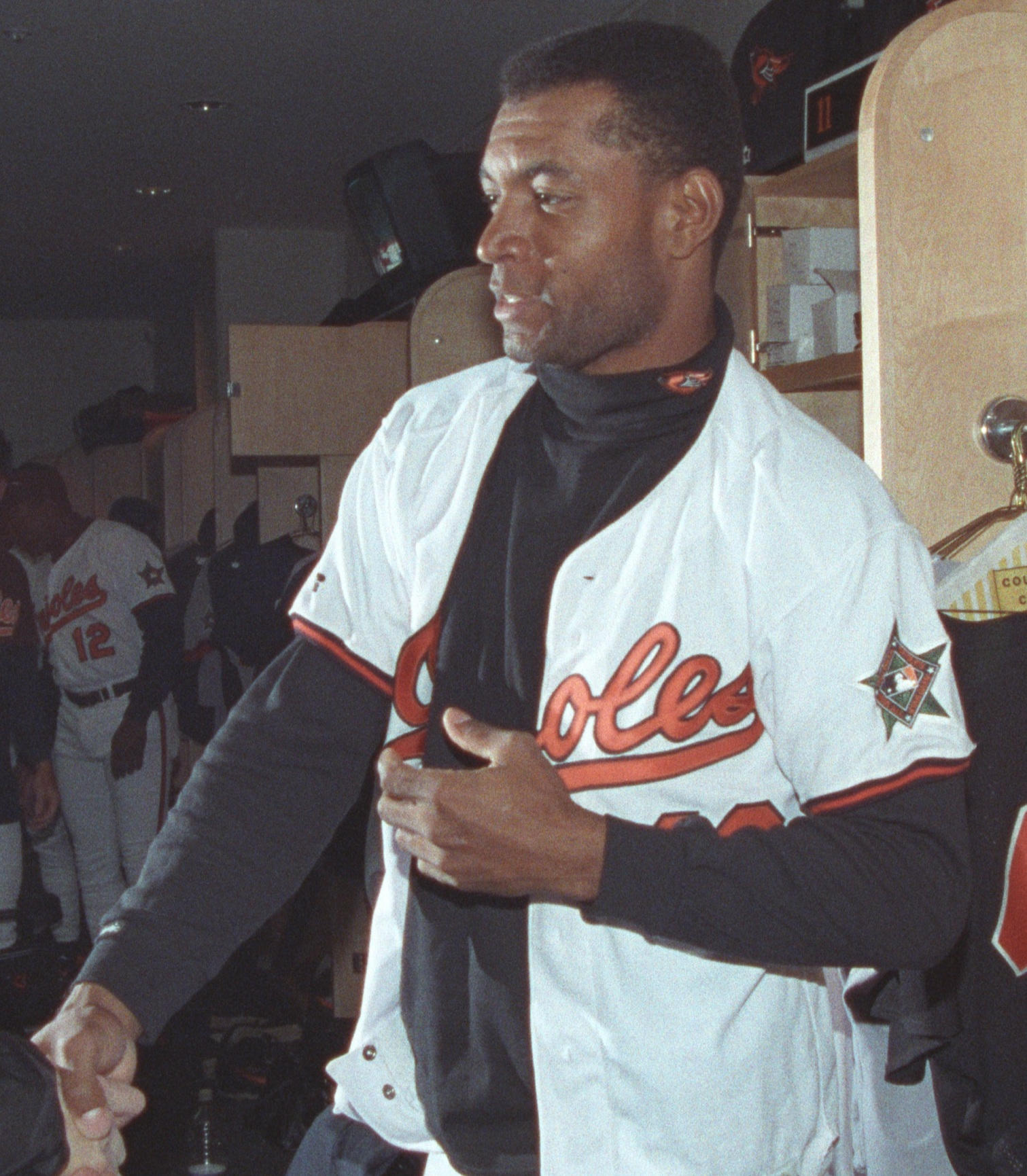
- Obando with the Baltimore Orioles in 1993
- Outfielder
- Born: January 23, 1970 (age 56); Bocas del Toro, Panama
- Batted: Right Threw: Right

Professional debut
- MLB: April 10, 1993, for the Baltimore Orioles
- NPB: May 23, 1999, for the Nippon-Ham Fighters

Last appearance
- MLB: July 21, 1997, for the Montreal Expos
- NPB: May 22, 2005, for the Hokkaido Nippon-Ham Fighters

MLB statistics
- Batting average: .239
- Home runs: 13
- Runs batted in: 49

NPB statistics
- Batting average: .294
- Home runs: 102
- Runs batted in: 314
- Stats at Baseball Reference

Teams
- Baltimore Orioles (1993, 1995); Montreal Expos (1996–1997); Nippon-Ham Fighters/Hokkaido Nippon-Ham Fighters (1999–2002, 2004–2005)

Sherman Omar Obando Gainor (born January 23, 1970) is a Panamanian former Major League Baseball player who played for the Baltimore Orioles and Montreal Expos. His main position was outfield, but often played as a first baseman or designated hitter. He is currently the first base coach for the Charleston RiverDogs.

== Major League career ==
Obando was signed by the New York Yankees in 1987, and was picked up by the Baltimore Orioles in 1992. He made his major league debut with the Orioles on April 10, 1993, and ended the season with 3 home runs and 15 RBIs. He was promoted again to the majors in 1995, but played in only 16 games. An outfielder with power-hitting potential but suspect on defense, he was traded from the Orioles to the Expos for Tony Tarasco during spring training on March 13, 1996. He played in 89 games in 1996, hitting 8 home runs and 22 RBIs. His playing time decreased from then on, and he played his last major league game on July 21, 1997.

== Japanese Professional League career ==
Obando was signed by the Nippon Ham Fighters in the middle of the 1999 season. He played poorly in his first few games, but gradually increased his output, and ended up with 20 home runs, 62 RBIs and a .306 batting average playing in 94 games.

Obando truly made his mark in his second year, hitting 30 home runs, 101 RBIs, and a .332 batting average despite missing over 30 games due to injuries. His batting average was the second highest in the Pacific League, after Ichiro Suzuki, and his slugging percentage was the highest in the league. He played in the all star game, and won the Best Nine Award this year. In a game against the Seibu Lions, he hit a home run that broke apart the lens of a television camera placed next to the backscreen of the Seibu Dome.

With Ichiro Suzuki gone away to the major leagues, Obando had a good chance at winning the triple crown, but sustained a knee injury that forced him out of over half of the 2001 season. Incredibly, he still contributed with 15 home runs and 51 RBIs in only 52 games (meaning that he had an RBI in almost every game he played).

In 2002, he played in 118 games, hitting 26 home runs and 68 RBIs, contributing greatly as a cleanup hitter. However, his knee worsened during the off-season, and the drop in his batting average (.263) compelled the Fighters to release him during the off-season. He was offered a contract from the Chunichi Dragons, but declined in favor of returning to the United States.

In 2004, the Hokkaido Nippon Ham Fighters had lent two of their regular players to the Athens Olympics Japanese baseball team, and Obando traveled to Japan with his own money to offer his services to his former team. He was signed cheaply in the middle of the season, and immediately began to display his solid batting abilities, hitting 8 home runs and 25 RBIs with a .338 batting average in 42 games. His clutch hitting contributed greatly to the team, and the Fighters made it to the playoffs that year.

Obando began the 2005 season with the Fighters, but fell into a slump and was dropped after only 24 games. He had played 6 seasons (4 full seasons) in the Japanese Pacific League.

== World Baseball Classic ==
Obando was chosen as a member of the Panamanian team, and played as a designated hitter, batting 5th. His team lost in the preliminary rounds of the tournament.

== Career statistics ==
Major Leagues

- 177 Games
- 85 Hits
- 13 Home runs
- 49 RBIs
- .239 Batting average

Japanese Professional Leagues

- 437 Games
- 458 Hits
- 102 Home runs
- 314 RBIs
- .294 Batting average
