= Alex Pacheco =

Alex Pacheco may refer to:

- Alex Pacheco (baseball), Venezuelan baseball player
- Alex Pacheco (activist), American animal rights activist, and co-founder of PETA
