= 1996 San Diego Padres season =

1996 San Diego Padres
- National League West champions
- League: National League
- Division: West
- Ballpark: Jack Murphy Stadium
- City: San Diego, California
- Record: 91–71 (.562)
- Divisional place: 1st
- Owners: Tom Werner, John Moores
- General managers: Kevin Towers
- Managers: Bruce Bochy
- Television: KFMB-TV; Prime Sports West (Jerry Coleman, Ted Leitner, Bob Chandler, Ken Levine)
- Radio: KFMB (AM) (Jerry Coleman, Ted Leitner, Bob Chandler, Ken Levine)

The 1996 San Diego Padres season was the 28th season in franchise history. They finished in first place in the National League West with a 91–71 won-loss record, one game ahead of the Los Angeles Dodgers. After trailing the Dodgers by two games heading into the final series of the season against them, the Padres recorded a three-game sweep to win the division crown.

== Offseason ==
- October 28, 1995: Rico Rossy was signed as a free agent with the San Diego Padres.
- November 29, 1995: Mike Sharperson signed as a free agent with the San Diego Padres.
- December 7, 1995: Fernando Valenzuela signed as a free agent with the San Diego Padres.
- December 14, 1995: Doug Dascenzo was signed as a free agent with the San Diego Padres.
- December 21, 1995: Wally Joyner was traded by the Kansas City Royals with Aaron Dorlarque (minors) to the San Diego Padres for Bip Roberts and Bryan Wolff (minors).
- December 21, 1995: Mike Oquist was signed as a free agent with the San Diego Padres.
- December 29, 1995: Rickey Henderson signed as a free agent with the San Diego Padres.
- March 22, 1996: Melvin Nieves was traded by the San Diego Padres with Raul Casanova and Richie Lewis to the Detroit Tigers for Sean Bergman, Todd Steverson, and Cade Gaspar (minors).

== Regular season ==
- On August 16, the San Diego Padres played the New York Mets in a game held at the Estadio de Béisbol Monterrey in Monterrey, Mexico.

=== Opening Day starters ===
- Brad Ausmus
- Ken Caminiti
- Andújar Cedeño
- Steve Finley
- Tony Gwynn
- Joey Hamilton
- Rickey Henderson
- Wally Joyner
- Jody Reed

=== Season standings ===
NL West
Team	W	L	Pct.	GB	Home	Road
San Diego Padres	91	71	.562	—	45‍–‍36	46‍–‍35
Los Angeles Dodgers	90	72	.556	1	47‍–‍34	43‍–‍38
Colorado Rockies	83	79	.512	8	55‍–‍26	28‍–‍53
San Francisco Giants	68	94	.420	23	38‍–‍44	30‍–‍50

=== Record vs. opponents ===
1996 National League record Source: MLB Standings Grid – 1996
Team	ATL	CHC	CIN	COL	FLA	HOU	LAD	MON	NYM	PHI	PIT	SD	SF	STL
Atlanta	—	7–5	7–5	5–7	6–7	6–6	5–7	10–3	7–6	9–4	9–3	9–4	7–5	9–4
Chicago	5–7	—	5–8	5–7	6–6	5–8	8–5	6–6	7–5	7–6	4–9	6–6	7–5	5–8
Cincinnati	5–7	8–5	—	7–6	3–9	7–6	4–8	3–9	6–6	10–2	5–8	9–3	9–4	5–8
Colorado	7–5	7–5	6–7	—	5–8	8–5	6–7	3–9	7–5	6–6	7–5	8–5	5–8	8–4
Florida	7–6	6–6	9–3	8–5	—	7–5	6–7	5–8	7–6	6–7	5–7	3–9	5–7	6–6
Houston	6–6	8–5	6–7	5–8	5–7	—	6–6	4–9	8–4	10–2	8–5	6–6	8–4	2–11
Los Angeles	7–5	5–8	8–4	7–6	7–6	6–6	—	9–3	8–4	7–6	6–6	5–8	7–6	8–4
Montreal	3–10	6–6	9–3	9–3	8–5	9–4	3–9	—	7–6	6–7	7–5	4–8	9–4	8–4
New York	6–7	5–7	6–6	5–7	6–7	4–8	4–8	6–7	—	7–6	8–5	3–10	6–6	5–7
Philadelphia	4–9	6–7	2–10	6–6	7–6	2–10	6–7	7–6	6–7	—	7–5	4–8	6–6	4–8
Pittsburgh	3–9	9–4	8–5	5–7	7–5	5–8	6–6	5–7	5–8	5–7	—	4–9	8–4	3–10
San Diego	4–9	6–6	3–9	5–8	9–3	6–6	8–5	8–4	10–3	8–4	9–4	—	11–2	4–8
San Francisco	5–7	5–7	4–9	8–5	7–5	4–8	6–7	4–9	6–6	6–6	4–8	2–11	—	7–6
St. Louis	4–9	8–5	8–5	4–8	6–6	11–2	4–8	4–8	7–5	8–4	10–3	8–4	6–7	—

=== Game log ===
1996 Game Log: 91–71 (Home: 45–36; Away: 46–35)
April: 17–10 (Home: 8–6; Away: 9–4)

#	Date	Opponent	Score	Win	Loss	Save	Attendance	Record
1	April 1	@ Cubs	4–5 (10)	Patterson	**Hoffman** (0–1)	—	38,734	0–1
2	April 3	@ Cubs	7–5	**Hamilton** (1–0)	Castillo	**Hoffman** (1)	29,638	1–1
3	April 5	@ Astros	10–4	**Tewksbury** (1–0)	Kile	—	28,629	2–1
4	April 6	@ Astros	8–4 (13)	**Hoffman** (1–1)	Small	—	24,510	3–1
5	April 7	@ Astros	17–2	**Bergman** (1–0)	Swindell	—	16,258	4–1
6	April 8	Marlins	9–2	**Hamilton** (2–0)	Hammond	—	44,470	5–1
7	April 9	Marlins	2–5 (10)	Leiter	**Blair** (0–1)	—	15,160	5–2
8	April 10	Marlins	3–0	**Tewksbury** (2–0)	Rapp	**Hoffman** (2)	10,510	6–2
9	April 11	Braves	2–1	**Ashby** (1–0)	Maddux	**Hoffman** (3)	19,047	7–2
10	April 12	Braves	3–5	Schmidt	**Bergman** (1–1)	Wohlers	25,747	7–3
11	April 13	Braves	6–2	**Hamilton** (3–0)	Glavine	**Bochtler** (1)	45,250	8–3
12	April 14	Braves	0–4	Smoltz	**Valenzuela** (0–1)	—	45,014	8–4
13	April 15	@ Rockies	9–11	Ruffin	**Blair** (0–2)	Leskanic	48,027	8–5
14	April 16	@ Rockies	10–6	**Ashby** (2–0)	Reynoso	—	48,031	9–5
15	April 17	@ Rockies	11–6	**Florie** (1–0)	Freeman	—	48,011	10–5
16	April 19	@ Braves	1–7	Smoltz	**Hamilton** (3–1)	—	27,375	10–6
17	April 20	@ Braves	5–6	McMichael	**Bochtler** (0–1)	Wohlers	31,893	10–7
18	April 21	@ Braves	2–1 (15)	**Worrell** (1–0)	Thobe	**Bochtler** (2)	28,829	11–7
19	April 22	@ Marlins	5–3	**Ashby** (3–0)	Burkett	—	17,473	12–7
20	April 23	@ Marlins	7–2	**Bergman** (2–1)	Hammond	—	19,667	13–7
21	April 24	Cubs	5–4	**Hamilton** (4–1)	Foster	**Hoffman** (4)	15,608	14–7
22	April 25	Cubs	8–3	**Tewksbury** (3–0)	Bullinger	—	18,736	15–7
23	April 26	Astros	3–2	**Worrell** (2–0)	Hampton	**Hoffman** (5)	21,254	16–7
24	April 27	Astros	0–6	Reynolds	**Ashby** (3–1)	—	38,309	16–8
25	April 28	Astros	2–3	Kile	**Bergman** (2–2)	Jones	27,208	16–9
26	April 29	Astros	2–0	**Hamilton** (5–1)	Brocail	—	8,979	17–9
27	April 30	Giants	4–9	Watson	**Tewksbury** (3–1)	—	14,170	17–10

May: 17–10 (Home: 9–5; Away: 8–5)

#	Date	Opponent	Score	Win	Loss	Save	Attendance	Record
28	May 1	Giants	9–4	**Valenzuela** (1–1)	Gardner	—	14,878	18–10
29	May 3	Cardinals	1–3	Osborne	**Ashby** (3–2)	Eckersley	21,335	18–11
30	May 4	Cardinals	3–4	Stottlemyre	**Bergman** (2–3)	Eckersley	44,375	18–12
31	May 5	Cardinals	10–4	**Hamilton** (6–1)	Benes	—	27,435	19–12
32	May 8	@ Pirates	5–4	**Tewksbury** (4–1)	May	**Hoffman** (6)	—	20–12
33	May 8	@ Pirates	3–4	Christiansen	**Sanders** (0–1)	Cordova	8,508	20–13
34	May 9	@ Pirates	7–1	**Ashby** (4–2)	Wagner	—	10,863	21–13
35	May 10	@ Reds	6–8	McElroy	**Florie** (1–1)	Brantley	22,508	21–14
36	May 11	@ Reds	0–1	Smiley	**Hamilton** (6–2)	Brantley	24,983	21–15
37	May 12	@ Reds	5–0	**Tewksbury** (5–1)	Burba	—	22,786	22–15
38	May 13	Mets	5–2	**Valenzuela** (2–1)	Isringhausen	—	12,829	23–15
39	May 14	Mets	9–4	**Ashby** (5–2)	Wilson	—	12,168	24–15
40	May 15	Mets	4–3 (10)	**Worrell** (3–0)	Franco	—	12,166	25–15
41	May 16	Mets	3–6	Harnisch	**Hamilton** (6–3)	Franco	17,341	25–16
42	May 17	Expos	2–1 (12)	**Hoffman** (2–1)	Rojas	—	26,469	26–16
43	May 18	Expos	2–3	Urbina	**Valenzuela** (2–2)	Rojas	31,749	26–17
44	May 19	Expos	4–3	**Worrell** (4–0)	Veres	**Hoffman** (7)	28,769	27–17
45	May 21	Phillies	4–5	Mulholland	**Bergman** (2–4)	Bottalico	11,954	27–18
46	May 22	Phillies	5–2	**Hamilton** (7–3)	Grace	**Hoffman** (8)	13,118	28–18
47	May 23	Phillies	7–5	**Sanders** (1–1)	Springer	**Hoffman** (9)	16,632	29–18
48	May 24	@ Mets	13–1	**Valenzuela** (3–2)	Isringhausen	—	24,751	30–18
49	May 25	@ Mets	7–2	**Ashby** (6–2)	Wilson	—	21,057	31–18
50	May 26	@ Mets	0–1	Jones	**Bergman** (2–5)	Franco	20,405	31–19
51	May 27	@ Expos	4–3	**Hamilton** (8–3)	Fassero	**Hoffman** (10)	44,636	32–19
52	May 28	@ Expos	3–2 (10)	**Hoffman** (3–1)	Scott	**Bochtler** (3)	16,537	33–19
53	May 29	@ Expos	4–9	Urbina	**Valenzuela** (3–3)	—	14,386	33–20
54	May 31	@ Phillies	4–2	**Ashby** (7–2)	Mulholland	**Hoffman** (11)	22,110	34–20

June: 9–19 (Home: 3–12; Away: 6–7)

#	Date	Opponent	Score	Win	Loss	Save	Attendance	Record
55	June 1	@ Phillies	8–3	**Bergman** (3–5)	Mimbs	—	27,623	35–20
56	June 2	@ Phillies	8–9 (12)	Borland	**Hoffman** (3–2)	—	32,035	35–21
57	June 3	Cardinals	0–3	Benes	**Tewksbury** (5–2)	—	13,625	35–22
58	June 4	Cardinals	5–11	Petkovsek	**Worrell** (4–1)	—	13,427	35–23
59	June 5	Cardinals	6–4	**Hoffman** (4–2)	Fossas	—	12,216	36–23
60	June 7	Pirates	0–10	Smith	**Bergman** (3–6)	—	20,312	36–24
61	June 8	Pirates	8–9 (14)	Cordova	**Blair** (0–3)	—	41,378	36–25
62	June 9	Pirates	0–6	Darwin	**Tewksbury** (5–3)	—	30,932	36–26
63	June 10	Reds	3–6	Smith	**Bochtler** (0–2)	Brantley	41,120	36–27
64	June 11	Reds	1–4	Jarvis	**Valenzuela** (3–4)	Brantley	12,029	36–28
65	June 12	Reds	4–9	Smiley	**Florie** (1–2)	—	11,411	36–29
66	June 13	@ Cubs	3–6 (14)	Jones	**Blair** (0–4)	—	28,953	36–30
67	June 14	@ Cubs	1–5	Trachsel	**Tewksbury** (5–4)	—	30,877	36–31
68	June 15	@ Cubs	2–1	**Worrell** (5–1)	Navarro	**Hoffman** (12)	39,465	37–31
69	June 16	@ Cubs	4–8	Castillo	**Valenzuela** (3–5)	Bullinger	33,376	37–32
70	June 17	@ Braves	3–9	Maddux	**Bergman** (3–7)	—	32,934	37–33
71	June 18	@ Braves	3–5	Clontz	**Hamilton** (8–4)	Wohlers	32,730	37–34
72	June 19	@ Braves	1–5	Smoltz	**Tewksbury** (5–5)	—	34,823	37–35
73	June 20	Cubs	2–3	Navarro	**Worrell** (5–2)	Wendell	19,969	37–36
74	June 21	Cubs	2–1 (10)	**Hoffman** (5–2)	Wendell	—	49,503	38–36
75	June 22	Cubs	6–9 (16)	Myers	**Blair** (0–5)	—	51,917	38–37
76	June 23	Cubs	5–4	**Hamilton** (9–4)	Telemaco	**Hoffman** (13)	30,672	39–37
77	June 25	Astros	4–9	Jones	**Sanders** (1–2)	—	13,458	39–38
78	June 26	Astros	3–4	Wall	**Worrell** (5–3)	Wagner	12,388	39–39
79	June 27	@ Giants	11–1	**Valenzuela** (4–5)	Gardner	—	12,325	40–39
80	June 28	@ Giants	6–1	**Ashby** (8–2)	Fernandez	**Hoffman** (14)	13,129	41–39
81	June 29	@ Giants	7–6	**Blair** (1–5)	Beck	**Hoffman** (15)	24,540	42–39
82	June 30	@ Giants	7–4	**Tewksbury** (6–5)	VanLandingham	**Hoffman** (16)	26,373	43–39

July: 15–12 (Home: 9–4; Away: 6–8)

#	Date	Opponent	Score	Win	Loss	Save	Attendance	Record
83	July 1	Dodgers	2–10	Candiotti	**Worrell** (5–4)	—	40,343	43–40
84	July 2	Dodgers	3–7	Astacio	**Valenzuela** (4–6)	—	28,294	43–41
85	July 3	Dodgers	3–2	**Hamilton** (10–4)	Martinez	**Hoffman** (17)	48,841	44–41
86	July 4	Giants	8–4	**Tewksbury** (7–5)	Leiter	—	14,111	45–41
87	July 5	Giants	7–6 (11)	**Bergman** (4–7)	Bautista	—	22,589	46–41
88	July 6	Giants	7–3	**Worrell** (6–4)	Bourgeois	**Hoffman** (18)	51,021	47–41
89	July 7	Giants	10–3	**Valenzuela** (5–6)	Fernandez	—	32,693	48–41
90	July 11	@ Rockies	5–8 (10)	Ruffin	**Hoffman** (5–3)	—	45,703	48–42
91	July 12	@ Rockies	12–13	Holmes	**Blair** (1–6)	—	48,053	48–43
92	July 13	@ Rockies	6–11	Ritz	**Sanders** (1–3)	—	48,009	48–44
93	July 14	@ Rockies	4–8	Reynoso	**Valenzuela** (5–7)	—	48,065	48–45
94	July 15	@ Dodgers	0–1 (10)	Guthrie	**Hoffman** (5–4)	—	44,368	48–46
95	July 16	@ Dodgers	10–1	**Tewksbury** (8–5)	Martinez	**Worrell** (1)	52,436	49–46
96	July 17	@ Dodgers	5–4	**Florie** (2–2)	Osuna	**Hoffman** (19)	42,423	50–46
97	July 18	Rockies	9–2	**Sanders** (2–3)	Ritz	—	24,212	51–46
98	July 19	Rockies	4–3	**Valenzuela** (6–7)	Reynoso	**Hoffman** (20)	26,559	52–46
99	July 20	Rockies	4–5	Leskanic	**Bochtler** (0–3)	Ruffin	55,046	52–47
100	July 21	Rockies	2–0	**Tewksbury** (9–5)	Freeman	**Hoffman** (21)	36,686	53–47
101	July 22	@ Astros	0–1	Reynolds	**Hamilton** (10–5)	Wagner	21,563	53–48
102	July 23	@ Astros	7–4	**Sanders** (3–3)	Hampton	**Hoffman** (22)	19,620	54–48
103	July 24	@ Astros	4–6 (10)	Hernandez	**Villone** (0–1)	—	19,168	54–49
104	July 26	@ Marlins	3–0 (11)	**Hoffman** (6–4)	Pall	—	19,677	55–49
105	July 27	@ Marlins	20–12	**Villone** (1–1)	Mathews	—	26,182	56–49
106	July 28	@ Marlins	2–8	Leiter	**Hamilton** (10–6)	—	22,683	56–50
107	July 29	@ Marlins	5–3	**Sanders** (4–3)	Brown	**Hoffman** (23)	18,281	57–50
108	July 30	Braves	2–1	**Valenzuela** (7–7)	Maddux	**Hoffman** (24)	24,110	58–50
109	July 31	Braves	4–7	Glavine	**Tewksbury** (9–6)	Wohlers	24,254	58–51

August: 18–10 (Home: 9–4; Away: 9–6)

#	Date	Opponent	Score	Win	Loss	Save	Attendance	Record
110	August 1	Braves	2–3	Bielecki	**Worrell** (6–5)	Wohlers	24,089	58–52
111	August 2	Marlins	2–1	**Hoffman** (7–4)	Perez	—	18,239	59–52
112	August 3	Marlins	2–5	Brown	**Sanders** (4–4)	Nen	55,412	59–53
113	August 4	Marlins	6–4	**Valenzuela** (8–7)	Hammond	**Hoffman** (25)	35,302	60–53
114	August 5	@ Cardinals	2–8	Benes	**Tewksbury** (9–7)	—	28,653	60–54
115	August 6	@ Cardinals	1–0	**Worrell** (7–5)	Osborne	**Hoffman** (26)	25,782	61–54
116	August 7	@ Cardinals	0–1	Petkovsek	**Bochtler** (0–4)	—	24,823	61–55
117	August 8	@ Pirates	12–3	**Sanders** (5–4)	Peters	—	8,388	62–55
118	August 9	@ Pirates	4–1	**Valenzuela** (9–7)	Miceli	**Hoffman** (27)	30,066	63–55
119	August 10	@ Pirates	6–2	**Veras** (1–0)	Plesac	—	21,902	64–55
120	August 11	@ Pirates	7–5	**Bergman** (5–7)	Parris	**Hoffman** (28)	27,227	65–55
121	August 13	@ Reds	4–10	Jarvis	**Hamilton** (10–7)	—	20,205	65–56
122	August 14	@ Reds	1–2 (13)	Smith	**Bergman** (5–8)	—	20,983	65–57
123	August 15	@ Reds	2–3	Burba	**Tewksbury** (9–8)	Brantley	23,143	65–58
124	August 16	Mets	15–10	**Valenzuela** (10–7)	Person	—	23,699	66–58
125	August 17	Mets	3–7	Clark	**Worrell** (7–6)	Henry	20,873	66–59
126	August 18	Mets	8–0	**Hamilton** (11–7)	Wilson	—	22,810	67–59
127	August 19	Expos	7–3	**Sanders** (6–4)	Martinez	**Hoffman** (29)	33,490	68–59
128	August 20	Expos	3–0	**Tewksbury** (10–8)	Cormier	**Hoffman** (30)	18,426	69–59
129	August 21	Expos	7–2	**Valenzuela** (11–7)	Urbina	—	29,182	70–59
130	August 23	Phillies	4–7	Hunter	**Worrell** (7–7)	Bottalico	22,102	70–60
131	August 24	Phillies	7–1	**Hamilton** (12–7)	Beech	—	31,023	71–60
132	August 25	Phillies	11–2	**Sanders** (7–4)	West	—	30,036	72–60
133	August 27	@ Mets	4–3	**Blair** (2–6)	Mlicki	**Hoffman** (31)	17,925	73–60
134	August 28	@ Mets	3–2 (12)	**Bergman** (6–8)	Wallace	**Hoffman** (32)	17,442	74–60
135	August 29	@ Mets	3–2	**Hamilton** (13–7)	Wilson	**Hoffman** (33)	17,016	75–60
136	August 30	@ Expos	6–0	**Sanders** (8–4)	Paniagua	—	14,133	76–60
137	August 31	@ Expos	2–4	Daal	**Tewksbury** (10–9)	Rojas	18,235	76–61

September: 15–10 (Home: 7–5; Away: 8–5)

#	Date	Opponent	Score	Win	Loss	Save	Attendance	Record
138	September 1	@ Expos	6–7	Fassero	**Ashby** (8–3)	Rojas	20,666	76–62
139	September 2	@ Phillies	5–1	**Valenzuela** (12–7)	Hunter	—	15,263	77–62
140	September 3	@ Phillies	2–8	Mimbs	**Hamilton** (13–8)	Ryan	16,797	77–63
141	September 4	@ Phillies	2–1	**Sanders** (9–4)	Beech	**Hoffman** (34)	18,754	78–63
142	September 6	@ Cardinals	3–8	Petkovsek	**Tewksbury** (10–10)	—	28,116	78–64
143	September 7	@ Cardinals	3–8	Osborne	**Ashby** (8–4)	—	42,846	78–65
144	September 8	@ Cardinals	5–4	**Valenzuela** (13–7)	Stottlemyre	**Hoffman** (35)	30,897	79–65
145	September 9	Pirates	6–5	**Hermanson** (1–0)	Wilkins	**Hoffman** (36)	15,727	80–65
146	September 10	Pirates	6–5	**Hoffman** (8–4)	Boever	—	15,694	81–65
147	September 11	Pirates	8–7	**Bochtler** (1–4)	Ericks	—	33,771	82–65
148	September 13	Reds	1–3	Morgan	**Ashby** (8–5)	Brantley	26,524	82–66
149	September 14	Reds	3–2 (12)	**Veras** (2–0)	Smith	—	25,231	83–66
150	September 15	Reds	8–0	**Hamilton** (14–8)	Jarvis	**Blair** (1)	29,005	84–66
151	September 16	@ Giants	2–1 (11)	**Hoffman** (9–4)	Beck	—	8,853	85–66
152	September 17	@ Giants	7–9	Poole	**Veras** (2–1)	Beck	12,737	85–67
153	September 18	@ Giants	8–5	**Bochtler** (2–4)	DeLucia	**Hoffman** (37)	11,996	86–67
154	September 19	Dodgers	0–7	Martinez	**Valenzuela** (13–8)	—	41,287	86–68
155	September 20	Dodgers	4–2	**Hamilton** (15–8)	Candiotti	**Hoffman** (38)	51,217	87–68
156	September 21	Dodgers	2–9	Valdez	**Sanders** (9–5)	—	53,629	87–69
157	September 22	Dodgers	3–2	**Ashby** (9–5)	Nomo	**Hoffman** (39)	51,092	88–69
158	September 24	Rockies	4–5 (11)	Ruffin	**Hoffman** (9–5)	Swift	23,556	88–70
159	September 25	Rockies	3–5	Thompson	**Hamilton** (15–9)	Ruffin	32,706	88–71
160	September 27	@ Dodgers	5–2 (10)	**Worrell** (8–7)	Osuna	**Hoffman** (40)	53,294	89–71
161	September 28	@ Dodgers	4–2	**Worrell** (9–7)	Dreifort	**Hoffman** (41)	52,977	90–71
162	September 29	@ Dodgers	2–0 (11)	**Veras** (3–1)	Park	**Hoffman** (42)	53,270	91–71

Legend: = Win = Loss
Bold = Padres team member

=== Detailed records ===
National League
Opponent	W	L	WP	RS	RA
NL East
Atlanta Braves	4	9	0.308	34	56
Florida Marlins	9	3	0.750	66	45
Montreal Expos	8	4	0.667	50	37
New York Mets	10	3	0.769	77	43
Philadelphia Phillies	8	4	0.667	67	46
Total	39	23	0.629	294	227
NL Central
Chicago Cubs	6	6	0.500	49	54
Cincinnati Reds	3	9	0.250	38	48
Houston Astros	6	6	0.500	60	45
Pittsburgh Pirates	9	4	0.692	72	62
St. Louis Cardinals	4	8	0.333	39	58
Total	28	33	0.459	258	267
NL West
Colorado Rockies	5	8	0.385	83	83
Los Angeles Dodgers	8	5	0.615	43	49
**San Diego Padres**					
San Francisco Giants	11	2	0.846	93	56
Total	24	15	0.615	219	188
Season Total	91	71	0.562	771	682

Month	Games	Won	Lost	Win %	RS	RA
April	27	17	10	0.630	145	108
May	27	17	10	0.630	129	87
June	28	9	19	0.321	113	155
July	27	15	12	0.556	148	133
August	28	18	10	0.643	134	91
September	25	15	10	0.600	102	108
Total	162	91	71	0.562	771	682

	Games	Won	Lost	Win %	RS	RA
Home	81	45	36	0.556	356	337
Away	81	46	35	0.568	415	345
Total	162	91	71	0.562	771	682

=== Notable transactions ===
- July 31, 1996: Marc Newfield was traded by the San Diego Padres with Bryce Florie and Ron Villone to the Milwaukee Brewers for a player to be named later and Greg Vaughn. The Milwaukee Brewers sent Gerald Parent (minors) (September 16, 1996) to the San Diego Padres to complete the trade.

=== Roster ===
1996 San Diego Padres
**Roster**
**Pitchers**: 43 Andy Ashby; 44 Sean Bergman; 55 Andrés Berumen; 47 Willie Blair; 45 Doug Bochtler; 33 Glenn Dishman; 39 Bryce Florie; 50 Joey Hamilton; 48 Dustin Hermanson; 51 Trevor Hoffman; 40 Mike Oquist; 35 Al Osuna; 27 Scott Sanders; 31 Bob Tewksbury; 34 Fernando Valenzuela; 53 Darío Veras; 49 Ron Villone; 39 Pete Walker; 36 Tim Worrell	**Catchers**: 11 Brad Ausmus; 23 John Flaherty; 25 Brian Johnson; **Infielders**: 21 Ken Caminiti; 10 Andújar Cedeño; 29 Archi Cianfrocco; 10 Chris Gomez; 22 Wally Joyner; 8 Scott Livingstone; 1 Luis López; 3 Jody Reed; 18 Craig Shipley; 2 Jim Tatum; 35 Jason Thompson	**Outfielders**: 17 Doug Dascenzo; 28 Rob Deer; 12 Steve Finley; 9,17 Chris Gwynn; 19 Tony Gwynn; 24 Rickey Henderson; 14 Marc Newfield; 7 Greg Vaughn; **Other batters**: 59 Sean Mulligan; 13 Todd Steverson	**Manager**: 15 Bruce Bochy; **Coaches**: 4 Tim Flannery (third base); 22 Grady Little (bullpen); 42 Davey Lopes (first base); 5 Rob Picciolo (bench); 16 Merv Rettenmund (hitting); 37 Dan Warthen (pitching)

== Player stats ==
= Indicates team leader

= Indicates league leader

=== Batting ===
==== Starters by position ====
Note: Pos = Position; G = Games played; AB = At bats; H = Hits; Avg. = Batting average; HR = Home runs; RBI = Runs batted in

Pos	Player	G	AB	H	Avg.	HR	RBI
C	John Flaherty	72	263	80	.303	9	41
1B	Wally Joyner	121	433	120	.277	8	64
2B	Jody Reed	146	495	121	.244	2	49
SS	Chris Gomez	89	328	86	.262	3	29
3B	Ken Caminiti	146	546	178	.326	40	130
LF	Rickey Henderson	148	465	112	.241	9	29
CF	Steve Finley	161	655	195	.298	30	95
RF	Tony Gwynn	116	451	159	.353	3	50

==== Other batters ====
Note: G = Games played; AB = At bats; H = Hits; Avg. = Batting average; HR = Home runs; RBI = Runs batted in

Player	G	AB	H	Avg.	HR	RBI
Brian Johnson	82	243	66	.272	8	35
Archi Cianfrocco	79	192	54	.281	2	32
Marc Newfield	84	191	48	.251	5	26
Scott Livingstone	102	172	51	.297	2	20
Andújar Cedeño	49	154	36	.234	3	18
Brad Ausmus	50	149	27	.181	1	13
Greg Vaughn	43	141	29	.206	10	22
Luis López	63	139	25	.180	2	11
Craig Shipley	33	92	29	.315	1	7
Chris Gwynn	81	90	16	.178	1	10
Rob Deer	25	50	9	.180	4	9
Jason Thompson	13	49	11	.224	2	6
Doug Dascenzo	21	9	1	.111	0	0
Jim Tatum	5	3	0	.000	0	0
Sean Mulligan	2	1	0	.000	0	0
Todd Steverson	1	1	0	.000	0	0

=== Pitching ===
==== Starting pitchers ====
Note: G = Games pitched; IP = Innings pitched; W = Wins; L = Losses; ERA = Earned run average; SO = Strikeouts

Player	G	IP	W	L	ERA	SO
Joey Hamilton	34	211.2	15	9	4.17	184
Bob Tewksbury	36	206.2	10	10	4.31	126
Fernando Valenzuela	33	171.2	13	8	3.62	95
Andy Ashby	24	150.2	9	5	3.23	85

==== Other pitchers ====
Note: G = Games pitched; IP = Innings pitched; W = Wins; L = Losses; ERA = Earned run average; SO = Strikeouts

Player	G	IP	W	L	ERA	SO
Scott Sanders	46	144.0	9	5	3.38	157
Tim Worrell	50	121.0	9	7	3.05	99
Sean Bergman	41	113.1	6	8	4.37	85

==== Relief pitchers ====
Note: G = Games pitched; W = Wins; L = Losses; SV = Saves; ERA = Earned run average; SO = Strikeouts

Player	G	W	L	SV	ERA	SO
Trevor Hoffman	70	9	5	42	2.25	111
Doug Bochtler	63	2	4	3	3.02	68
Willie Blair	60	2	6	1	4.60	67
Bryce Florie	39	2	2	0	4.01	51
Dario Veras	23	3	1	0	2.79	23
Ron Villone	21	1	1	0	2.95	19
Al Osuna	10	0	0	0	2.25	4
Dustin Hermanson	8	1	0	0	8.56	11
Mike Oquist	8	0	0	0	2.35	4
Andrés Berumen	3	0	0	0	5.40	4
Glenn Dishman	3	0	0	0	7.71	0
Pete Walker	1	0	0	0	0.00	1

== National League Division Series ==
=== St. Louis Cardinals vs. San Diego Padres ===
St. Louis wins the series, 3-0

Game	Home	Score	Visitor	Score	Date	Series
1	St. Louis	3	San Diego	1	October 1	1-0 (STL)
2	St. Louis	5	San Diego	4	October 3	2-0 (STL)
3	San Diego	5	St. Louis	7	October 5	3-0 (STL)

The Cardinals and Padres began their rivalry in this series. The Cardinals' first of three postseason victories against the Padres took place here. Their dominance is overwhelming to the tune of only one loss against the Padres lifetime in the postseason.

A 3-run homer by Gary Gaetti off Joey Hamilton in Game 1 put the Cardinals up for good. Todd Stottlemyre pitched masterfully, allowing only one earned run on a solo home run by Rickey Henderson. Rick Honeycutt and Dennis Eckersley shut the Padres down for the win.

A well fought Game 2 saw the Cardinals squander two leads. Scott Sanders faced Andy Benes. Willie McGee put the Cardinals on top on the 3rd with an RBI single. Ken Caminiti tied the game with a leadoff homer in the 5th. Ron Gant cleared the bases with a double in the Cardinals 5th to make it 4-1. A 2 run single by Tony Gwynn made it a one run game in the Padres 6th. An RBI ground out by Steve Finley tied the game in the Padres 8th. But the Cardinals would score a run in the 8th on an RBI ground out that scored Brian Jordan. Dennis Eckersley got his 2nd save of the postseason.

In Game 3, the Cardinals looked to Donovan Osborne to put the Padres away. Opposing the potential sweep would be Andy Ashby. Brian Jordan put the Cardinals ahead when he singled to center field to score Royce Clayton. A would-be double play ball in the bottom of the 2nd helped the Padres take the lead 2-1. Then Ken Caminiti homered to make it 3-1 in the 3rd. An RBI single in the bottom of the 4th made it 4-1 Padres and Osborne was done. But the Cardinals were not about to let the series go another game. A leadoff homer by Ron Gant made it 4-2 in the 6th. But a one-out triple by John Mabry scored Jordan and a single would bring him home to tie the game at 4. The Cardinals would take the lead in the 7th when Ray Lankford scored on a double play. The Padres were now 6 outs from being eliminated. But when Caminiti hit his second homer of the game to tie it at 5, the Padres were still alive. However, the Cardinals put the game away in the top of the 9th when Jordan hit a two-run homer that proved to be the series winner. A one-out single by Rickey Henderson in the 9th put the tying run at the plate but nothing would be made of it as Eckersley got his 3rd save in as many tries to win the series.

== Award winners ==
- Ken Caminiti, National League Most Valuable Player

1996 Major League Baseball All-Star Game

- Tony Gwynn
- Ken Caminiti

== Farm system ==
Level	Team	League	Manager
AAA	Las Vegas Stars	Pacific Coast League	Jerry Royster
AA	Memphis Chicks	Southern League	Ed Romero
A	Rancho Cucamonga Quakes	California League	Mike Basso
A	Clinton LumberKings	Midwest League	Mike Ramsey
Rookie	AZL Padres	Arizona League	Larry See
Rookie	Idaho Falls Braves	Pioneer League	Don Werner

LEAGUE CHAMPIONS: AZL Padres
