= 1996 Colorado Rockies season =

1996 Colorado Rockies
- League: National League
- Division: West
- Ballpark: Coors Field
- City: Denver, Colorado
- Record: 83–79 (.512)
- Divisional place: 3rd
- Owner: Jerry McMorris
- General manager: Bob Gebhard
- Manager: Don Baylor
- Television: KWGN-TV (Dave Campbell, Dave Armstrong)
- Radio: KOA (AM) (Wayne Hagin, Jeff Kingery); KCUV (Francisco Gamez, Carlos Bido)
- Stats: ESPN.com; Baseball Reference

The Colorado Rockies' 1996 season was the fourth for the Rockies. Managed by Don Baylor, they played home games at Coors Field and finished with a record of 83–79, third in the National League West.

== Offseason ==
- November 20, 1995: Joe Girardi was traded by the Colorado Rockies to the New York Yankees for Mike DeJean.
- December 18, 1995: Jeff Reed was signed as a free agent by the Colorado Rockies.

== Regular season ==
- The first (and as of 2024, only) no-hitter at Coors Field was thrown by Hideo Nomo of the Los Angeles Dodgers on September 17, 1996.
- On May 11, 1996, Al Leiter threw the first no-hitter in Florida Marlins history at the expense of the Rockies. The Marlins beat the Rockies by a score of 11–0 in Miami.

=== Season standings ===
NL West
Team	W	L	Pct.	GB	Home	Road
San Diego Padres	91	71	.562	—	45‍–‍36	46‍–‍35
Los Angeles Dodgers	90	72	.556	1	47‍–‍34	43‍–‍38
Colorado Rockies	83	79	.512	8	55‍–‍26	28‍–‍53
San Francisco Giants	68	94	.420	23	38‍–‍44	30‍–‍50

=== Record vs. opponents ===
1996 National League record Source: MLB Standings Grid – 1996
Team	ATL	CHC	CIN	COL	FLA	HOU	LAD	MON	NYM	PHI	PIT	SD	SF	STL
Atlanta	—	7–5	7–5	5–7	6–7	6–6	5–7	10–3	7–6	9–4	9–3	9–4	7–5	9–4
Chicago	5–7	—	5–8	5–7	6–6	5–8	8–5	6–6	7–5	7–6	4–9	6–6	7–5	5–8
Cincinnati	5–7	8–5	—	7–6	3–9	7–6	4–8	3–9	6–6	10–2	5–8	9–3	9–4	5–8
Colorado	7–5	7–5	6–7	—	5–8	8–5	6–7	3–9	7–5	6–6	7–5	8–5	5–8	8–4
Florida	7–6	6–6	9–3	8–5	—	7–5	6–7	5–8	7–6	6–7	5–7	3–9	5–7	6–6
Houston	6–6	8–5	6–7	5–8	5–7	—	6–6	4–9	8–4	10–2	8–5	6–6	8–4	2–11
Los Angeles	7–5	5–8	8–4	7–6	7–6	6–6	—	9–3	8–4	7–6	6–6	5–8	7–6	8–4
Montreal	3–10	6–6	9–3	9–3	8–5	9–4	3–9	—	7–6	6–7	7–5	4–8	9–4	8–4
New York	6–7	5–7	6–6	5–7	6–7	4–8	4–8	6–7	—	7–6	8–5	3–10	6–6	5–7
Philadelphia	4–9	6–7	2–10	6–6	7–6	2–10	6–7	7–6	6–7	—	7–5	4–8	6–6	4–8
Pittsburgh	3–9	9–4	8–5	5–7	7–5	5–8	6–6	5–7	5–8	5–7	—	4–9	8–4	3–10
San Diego	4–9	6–6	3–9	5–8	9–3	6–6	8–5	8–4	10–3	8–4	9–4	—	11–2	4–8
San Francisco	5–7	5–7	4–9	8–5	7–5	4–8	6–7	4–9	6–6	6–6	4–8	2–11	—	7–6
St. Louis	4–9	8–5	8–5	4–8	6–6	11–2	4–8	4–8	7–5	8–4	10–3	8–4	6–7	—

=== Game log ===
1996 Game Log: 83–79 (Home: 55–26; Away: 28–53)
April: 11–14 (Home: 5–8; Away: 6–6)

#	Date	Opponent	Score	Win	Loss	Save	Attendance	Record
1	April 2	@ Phillies	5–3	**Ritz** (1–0)	Fernandez	—	36,751	1–0
2	April 3	@ Phillies	1–3	Grace	**Freeman** (0–1)	Bottalico	15,648	1–1
3	April 4	@ Phillies	4–7	Mulholland	**Rekar** (0–1)	Bottalico	16,220	1–2
4	April 5	@ Expos	4–6	Dyer	**Munoz** (0–1)	Rojas	45,042	1–3
5	April 6	@ Expos	5–4	**Thompson** (1–0)	Rueter	**Leskanic** (1)	27,040	2–3
6	April 7	@ Expos	1–9	Fassero	**Painter** (0–1)	—	11,212	2–4
7	April 8	Cubs	6–9	Adams	**Ritz** (1–1)	Jones	50,185	2–5
8	April 10	Cubs	10–9	**Leskanic** (1–0)	Jones	—	50,083	3–5
9	April 11	Mets	7–3	**Reynoso** (1–0)	Mlicki	—	48,010	4–5
10	April 12	Mets	6–5	**Freeman** (1–1)	Clark	**Leskanic** (2)	50,045	5–5
11	April 14	Mets	4–10	Harnisch	**Ritz** (1–2)	Henry	48,051	5–6
12	April 15	Padres	11–9	**Ruffin** (1–0)	Blair	**Leskanic** (3)	48,027	6–6
13	April 16	Padres	6–10	Ashby	**Reynoso** (1–1)	—	48,031	6–7
14	April 17	Padres	6–11	Florie	**Freeman** (1–2)	—	48,011	6–8
15	April 19	@ Mets	5–3	**Ritz** (2–2)	Harnisch	**Leskanic** (4)	16,225	7–8
16	April 20	@ Mets	3–4 (10)	Franco	**Habyan** (0–1)	—	20,847	7–9
17	April 21	@ Mets	6–4	**Leskanic** (2–0)	Franco	—	22,737	8–9
18	April 22	@ Cubs	4–2	**Freeman** (2–2)	Navarro	**Leskanic** (5)	21,227	9–9
19	April 23	@ Cubs	4–3	**Rekar** (1–1)	Castillo	**Leskanic** (6)	14,325	10–9
20	April 24	Phillies	8–10	Borland	**Reed** (0–1)	Bottalico	48,047	10–10
21	April 25	Phillies	1–7	Fernandez	**Thompson** (1–1)	Ryan	48,033	10–11
22	April 26	Expos	2–6	Alvarez	**Reynoso** (1–2)	—	48,024	10–12
23	April 27	Expos	6–5 (13)	**Painter** (1–1)	Daal	—	48,013	11–12
24	April 28	Expos	9–21	Rueter	**Rekar** (1–2)	—	48,006	11–13
25	April 30	@ Dodgers	4–7	Nomo	**Ritz** (2–3)	Worrell	31,037	11–14

May: 14–11 (Home: 10–2; Away: 4–9)

#	Date	Opponent	Score	Win	Loss	Save	Attendance	Record
26	May 1	@ Dodgers	4–1	**Thompson** (2–1)	Astacio	**Ruffin** (1)	30,377	12–14
27	May 3	Marlins	9–5	**Reynoso** (2–2)	Burkett	—	48,129	13–14
28	May 4	Marlins	17–5	**Freeman** (3–2)	Hammond	—	48,101	14–14
29	May 5	Marlins	5–4	**Ritz** (3–3)	Perez	—	48,134	15–14
30	May 6	@ Braves	1–4	Avery	**Thompson** (2–2)	—	28,725	15–15
31	May 7	@ Braves	5–6 (10)	Clontz	**Leskanic** (2–1)	—	29,976	15–16
32	May 8	@ Braves	1–5	Glavine	**Reynoso** (2–3)	—	29,363	15–17
33	May 9	@ Marlins	2–6	Miller	**Freeman** (3–3)	—	21,008	15–18
34	May 10	@ Marlins	2–4	Rapp	**Ritz** (3–4)	Nen	27,309	15–19
35	May 11	@ Marlins	0–11	Leiter	**Thompson** (2–3)	—	31,549	15–20
36	May 12	@ Marlins	5–7	Nen	**Leskanic** (2–2)	—	21,058	15–21
37	May 14	@ Reds	5–3	**Reed** (1–1)	Schourek	**Ruffin** (2)	20,535	16–21
38	May 17	Cardinals	12–11	**Leskanic** (3–2)	Bailey	**Ruffin** (3)	48,074	17–21
39	May 18	Cardinals	9–8	**Habyan** (1–1)	Eckersley	—	48,103	18–21
40	May 19	Cardinals	10–3	**Thompson** (3–3)	Benes	—	48,075	19–21
41	May 20	Pirates	10–7	**Reynoso** (3–3)	Neagle	—	48,042	20–21
42	May 21	Pirates	12–10	**Holmes** (1–0)	Christiansen	**Ruffin** (4)	48,037	21–21
43	May 22	Pirates	6–3	**Ritz** (4–4)	Smith	**Ruffin** (5)	48,044	22–21
44	May 23	Reds	5–7	Carrasco	**Ruffin** (1–1)	Brantley	48,040	22–22
45	May 24	Reds	9–11	Ruffin	**Thompson** (3–4)	—	48,019	22–23
46	May 25	Reds	7–5	**Leskanic** (4–2)	Moore	—	48,012	23–23
47	May 27	@ Cardinals	5–2	**Ritz** (5–4)	Stottlemyre	**Ruffin** (6)	38,804	24–23
48	May 28	@ Cardinals	6–5	**Painter** (2–1)	Mathews	**Holmes** (1)	26,913	25–23
49	May 29	@ Cardinals	5–6	Petkovsek	**Leskanic** (4–3)	Benes	27,856	25–24
50	May 31	@ Pirates	4–8	Neagle	**Reynoso** (3–4)	Cordova	26,640	25–25

June: 15–14 (Home: 12–5; Away: 3–9)

#	Date	Opponent	Score	Win	Loss	Save	Attendance	Record
51	June 1	@ Pirates	2–0	**Ritz** (6–4)	Wagner	**Ruffin** (7)	15,633	26–25
52	June 2	@ Pirates	2–5	Smith	**Holmes** (1–1)	Cordova	26,745	26–26
53	June 3	@ Pirates	2–7	Ruebel	**Farmer** (0–1)	—	8,120	26–27
54	June 4	@ Astros	8–16	Hampton	**Thompson** (3–5)	—	18,418	26–28
55	June 5	@ Astros	1–4	Wall	**Reynoso** (3–5)	—	14,954	26–29
56	June 6	@ Astros	14–7	**Ritz** (7–4)	Drabek	—	22,112	27–29
57	June 7	Braves	19–8	**Painter** (3–1)	Bielecki	—	48,027	28–29
58	June 8	Braves	13–12	**Holmes** (2–1)	McMichael	**Ruffin** (8)	48,015	29–29
59	June 9	Braves	3–8	Smoltz	**Thompson** (3–6)	—	48,036	29–30
60	June 10	Astros	9–10	Wall	**Reynoso** (3–6)	—	48,007	29–31
61	June 11	Astros	7–5	**Alston** (1–0)	Young	**Ruffin** (9)	48,014	30–31
62	June 12	Astros	8–0	**Freeman** (4–3)	Reynolds	—	48,024	31–31
63	June 13	Phillies	4–1	**Rekar** (2–2)	Schilling	**Ruffin** (10)	48,018	32–31
64	June 14	Phillies	10–6	**Painter** (4–1)	Springer	—	48,006	33–31
65	June 15	Phillies	4–2	**Reynoso** (4–6)	Mulholland	**Ruffin** (11)	48,023	34–31
66	June 16	Phillies	11–3	**Ritz** (8–4)	Munoz	—	48,041	35–31
67	June 17	Expos	3–5	Urbina	**Freeman** (4–4)	Rojas	48,021	35–32
68	June 18	Expos	8–12	Dyer	**Holmes** (2–2)	—	50,025	35–33
69	June 19	Expos	7–6 (10)	**Ruffin** (2–1)	Scott	—	48,007	36–33
70	June 21	@ Phillies	3–4 (10)	Borland	**Ruffin** (2–2)	—	25,085	36–34
71	June 22	@ Phillies	4–5	Blazier	**Hawblitzel** (0–1)	Bottalico	28,604	36–35
72	June 23	@ Phillies	7–4	**Freeman** (5–4)	Fernandez	**Ruffin** (12)	33,385	37–35
73	June 24	@ Mets	1–2	Isringhausen	**Holmes** (2–3)	Franco	16,988	37–36
74	June 25	@ Mets	2–3	Jones	**Thompson** (3–7)	Franco	18,251	37–37
75	June 26	@ Mets	5–9	Mlicki	**Reed** (1–2)	—	20,675	37–38
76	June 27	Dodgers	13–1	**Ritz** (9–4)	Astacio	—	48,043	38–38
77	June 28	Dodgers	13–4	**Freeman** (6–4)	Martinez	—	48,025	39–38
78	June 29	Dodgers	10–13	Valdez	**Rekar** (2–3)	—	48,009	39–39
79	June 30	Dodgers	16–15	**Ruffin** (3–2)	Worrell	—	48,103	40–39

July: 14–14 (Home: 11–3; Away: 3–11)

#	Date	Opponent	Score	Win	Loss	Save	Attendance	Record
80	July 1	@ Giants	6–9	Juden	**Painter** (4–2)	Beck	16,142	40–40
81	July 2	@ Giants	1–5	Gardner	**Ritz** (9–5)	—	13,571	40–41
82	July 3	@ Giants	3–2	**Leskanic** (5–3)	Beck	**Ruffin** (13)	44,356	41–41
83	July 4	@ Dodgers	4–9	Valdez	**Freeman** (6–5)	—	54,331	41–42
84	July 5	@ Dodgers	1–8	Nomo	**Bailey** (0–1)	—	43,415	41–43
85	July 6	@ Dodgers	2–3	Osuna	**Ruffin** (3–3)	Worrell	35,562	41–44
86	July 7	@ Dodgers	3–0	**Ritz** (10–5)	Astacio	—	38,269	42–44
87	July 11	Padres	8–5 (10)	**Ruffin** (4–3)	Hoffman	—	45,703	43–44
88	July 12	Padres	13–12	**Holmes** (3–3)	Blair	—	48,053	44–44
89	July 13	Padres	11–6	**Ritz** (11–5)	Sanders	—	48,009	45–44
90	July 14	Padres	8–4	**Reynoso** (5–6)	Valenzuela	—	48,065	46–44
91	July 15	Giants	7–3	**Bailey** (1–1)	Bourgeois	—	48,032	47–44
92	July 16	Giants	5–3	**Freeman** (7–5)	Leiter	**Ruffin** (14)	49,035	48–44
93	July 17	Giants	4–3	**Wright** (1–0)	Fernandez	**Ruffin** (15)	48,453	49–44
94	July 18	@ Padres	2–9	Sanders	**Ritz** (11–6)	—	24,212	49–45
95	July 19	@ Padres	3–4	Valenzuela	**Reynoso** (5–7)	Hoffman	26,559	49–46
96	July 20	@ Padres	5–4	**Leskanic** (6–3)	Bochtler	**Ruffin** (16)	55,046	50–46
97	July 21	@ Padres	0–2	Tewksbury	**Freeman** (7–6)	Hoffman	36,686	50–47
98	July 23	Mets	10–7	**Ruffin** (5–3)	Henry	—	48,016	51–47
99	July 23	Mets	11–10	**Reed** (2–2)	Henry	—	48,058	52–47
100	July 24	Mets	7–6 (10)	**Leskanic** (7–3)	Byrd	—	48,061	53–47
101	July 25	Cubs	8–10	Bottenfield	**Ruffin** (5–4)	Patterson	48,087	53–48
102	July 26	Cubs	4–17	Navarro	**Freeman** (7–7)	Adams	48,062	53–49
103	July 27	Cubs	10–6	**Thompson** (4–7)	Telemaco	—	48,096	54–49
104	July 28	Cubs	5–7	Bullinger	**Ritz** (11–7)	Bottenfield	48,073	54–50
105	July 29	@ Expos	1–4	Cormier	**Wright** (1–1)	Rojas	19,115	54–51
106	July 30	@ Expos	1–3	Urbina	**Reynoso** (5–8)	Rojas	17,071	54–52
107	July 31	@ Expos	2–6	Fassero	**Bailey** (1–2)	—	23,663	54–53

August: 16–14 (Home: 9–4; Away: 7–10)

#	Date	Opponent	Score	Win	Loss	Save	Attendance	Record
108	August 1	@ Cubs	1–4	Navarro	**Thompson** (4–8)	Patterson	25,564	54–54
109	August 2	@ Cubs	7–2	**Ritz** (12–7)	Telemaco	—	34,186	55–54
110	August 3	@ Cubs	8–2	**Wright** (2–1)	Bullinger	—	40,460	56–54
111	August 4	@ Cubs	6–1	**Reynoso** (6–8)	Castillo	—	38,738	57–54
112	August 5	Marlins	9–16	Hutton	**Freeman** (7–8)	—	48,313	57–55
113	August 6	Marlins	11–0	**Thompson** (5–8)	Burkett	—	48,339	58–55
114	August 7	Marlins	12–5	**Ritz** (13–7)	Leiter	—	48,622	59–55
115	August 9	@ Braves	6–4	**Wright** (3–1)	Glavine	**Ruffin** (17)	41,275	60–55
116	August 10	@ Braves	9–7 (10)	**Reed** (3–2)	Wohlers	**Ruffin** (18)	46,064	61–55
117	August 11	@ Braves	1–4	Smoltz	**Freeman** (7–9)	Wohlers	32,961	61–56
118	August 13	@ Marlins	0–5	Leiter	**Ritz** (13–8)	—	26,256	61–57
119	August 14	@ Marlins	1–2	Brown	**Leskanic** (7–4)	Nen	26,589	61–58
120	August 15	@ Marlins	6–7	Powell	**Ruffin** (5–5)	Nen	21,723	61–59
121	August 16	@ Reds	8–4	**Reynoso** (7–8)	Salkeld	—	28,878	62–59
122	August 17	@ Reds	3–5	Smiley	**Munoz** (0–2)	Brantley	—	62–60
123	August 17	@ Reds	5–9	Shaw	**Reed** (3–3)	—	34,225	62–61
124	August 18	@ Reds	4–9	Jarvis	**Ritz** (13–9)	Shaw	24,883	62–62
125	August 19	@ Reds	6–3	**Thompson** (6–8)	Portugal	—	22,670	63–62
126	August 20	Cardinals	5–4 (13)	**Munoz** (1–2)	Mathews	—	48,126	64–62
127	August 21	Cardinals	10–2	**Reynoso** (8–8)	Benes	—	48,045	65–62
128	August 22	Cardinals	10–5	**Bailey** (2–2)	Morgan	—	48,086	66–62
129	August 23	Pirates	3–5	Lieber	**Ritz** (13–10)	Cordova	48,038	66–63
130	August 24	Pirates	9–3	**Thompson** (7–8)	Peters	—	48,014	67–63
131	August 25	Pirates	13–9	**Munoz** (2–2)	Wilkins	—	48,139	68–63
132	August 26	Reds	9–5 (7)	**Swift** (1–0)	Jarvis	**Bailey** (1)	48,093	69–63
133	August 27	Reds	3–4	Smiley	**Reynoso** (8–9)	Brantley	50,046	69–64
134	August 28	Reds	10–9	**Ruffin** (6–5)	Shaw	—	48,057	70–64
135	August 29	Reds	7–18	Burba	**Thompson** (7–9)	—	48,029	70–65
136	August 30	@ Cardinals	4–7	Benes	**Wright** (3–2)	Eckersley	25,530	70–66
137	August 31	@ Cardinals	1–2	Benes	**Bailey** (2–3)	Eckersley	35,804	70–67

September: 13–12 (Home: 8–4; Away: 5–8)

#	Date	Opponent	Score	Win	Loss	Save	Attendance	Record
138	September 1	@ Cardinals	6–15	Petkovsek	**Rekar** (2–4)	—	28,552	70–68
139	September 2	@ Pirates	8–3	**Ritz** (14–10)	Loaiza	—	9,513	71–68
140	September 4	@ Pirates	2–5	Lieber	**Thompson** (7–10)	Plesac	10,081	71–69
141	September 6	@ Astros	1–2	Hernandez	**Leskanic** (7–5)	—	20,932	71–70
142	September 7	@ Astros	4–5	Kile	**Holmes** (3–4)	Hudek	37,213	71–71
143	September 8	@ Astros	5–2	**Reed** (4–3)	Reynolds	**Ruffin** (19)	31,316	72–71
144	September 9	@ Astros	4–2	**Ritz** (15–10)	Wall	**Ruffin** (20)	13,833	73–71
145	September 10	Braves	9–8	**Holmes** (4–4)	Clontz	**Ruffin** (21)	48,051	74–71
146	September 11	Braves	6–5	**Wright** (4–2)	Neagle	**Swift** (1)	48,091	75–71
147	September 12	Braves	16–8	**Burke** (1–0)	Smoltz	—	48,052	76–71
148	September 13	Astros	6–3	**Holmes** (5–4)	Hernandez	**Ruffin** (22)	48,049	77–71
149	September 14	Astros	7–3	**Ritz** (16–10)	Wall	—	48,132	78–71
150	September 15	Astros	11–4	**Thompson** (8–10)	Drabek	—	48,038	79–71
151	September 16	Dodgers	4–6	Valdez	**Wright** (4–3)	—	48,013	79–72
152	September 17	Dodgers	0–9	Nomo	**Swift** (1–1)	—	50,066	79–73
153	September 18	Dodgers	6–4	**Burke** (2–0)	Astacio	**Ruffin** (23)	50,053	80–73
154	September 19	@ Giants	4–11	VanLandingham	**Ritz** (16–11)	—	10,994	80–74
155	September 20	@ Giants	2–6	Gardner	**Thompson** (8–11)	—	15,734	80–75
156	September 21	@ Giants	2–6	Rueter	**Wright** (4–4)	—	30,002	80–76
157	September 22	@ Giants	3–7	Soderstrom	**Nied** (0–1)	—	30,826	80–77
158	September 24	@ Padres	5–4 (11)	**Ruffin** (7–5)	Hoffman	**Swift** (2)	23,556	81–77
159	September 25	@ Padres	5–3	**Thompson** (9–11)	Hamilton	**Ruffin** (24)	32,706	82–77
160	September 27	Giants	3–9	Soderstrom	**Nied** (0–2)	—	48,009	82–78
161	September 28	Giants	5–8	Carlson	**Burke** (2–1)	Beck	48,042	82–79
162	September 29	Giants	12–3	**Ritz** (17–11)	Watson	—	48,162	83–79

Legend: = Win = Loss
Bold = Rockies team member

=== Detailed records ===
National League
Opponent	W	L	WP	RS	RA
NL East
Atlanta Braves	7	5	0.583	89	79
Florida Marlins	5	8	0.385	79	77
Montreal Expos	3	9	0.250	49	87
New York Mets	7	5	0.583	67	66
Philadelphia Phillies	6	6	0.500	62	55
Total	28	33	0.459	346	364
NL Central
Chicago Cubs	7	5	0.583	73	72
Cincinnati Reds	6	7	0.462	81	92
Houston Astros	8	5	0.615	85	63
Pittsburgh Pirates	7	5	0.583	73	65
St. Louis Cardinals	8	4	0.667	83	70
Total	36	26	0.581	395	362
NL West
**Colorado Rockies**					
Los Angeles Dodgers	6	7	0.462	80	80
San Diego Padres	8	5	0.615	83	83
San Francisco Giants	5	8	0.385	57	75
Total	19	20	0.487	220	238
Season Total	83	79	0.512	961	964

Month	Games	Won	Lost	Win %	RS	RA
April	25	11	14	0.440	128	170
May	25	14	11	0.560	156	147
June	29	15	14	0.517	209	177
July	28	14	14	0.500	145	167
August	30	16	14	0.533	187	162
September	25	13	12	0.520	136	141
Total	162	83	79	0.512	961	964

	Games	Won	Lost	Win %	RS	RA
Home	81	55	26	0.679	658	559
Away	81	28	53	0.346	303	405
Total	162	83	79	0.512	961	964

=== Notable transactions ===
- June 4, 1996: Shawn Chacón was drafted by the Colorado Rockies in the 3rd round of the 1996 amateur draft. Player signed June 18, 1996.
- July 30, 1996: Eric Anthony was purchased by the Colorado Rockies from the Cincinnati Reds.
- August 21, 1996: Steve Decker was purchased by the Colorado Rockies from the San Francisco Giants.
- August 31, 1996: Marvin Freeman was selected off waivers by the Chicago White Sox from the Colorado Rockies.

=== Major League debuts ===
- Batters:
  - Angel Echevarria (Jul 15)
  - Neifi Pérez (Aug 31)
  - Alan Cockrell (Sep 7)
  - Terry Jones (Sep 9)
- Pitchers:
  - Mike Farmer (May 4)
  - Garvin Alston (Jun 6)
  - Ryan Hawblitzel (Jun 9)
  - Jamey Wright (Jul 3)
  - John Burke (Aug 13)
  - Robbie Beckett (Sep 12)

=== Roster ===
1996 Colorado Rockies
**Roster**
**Pitchers**: 50 Garvin Alston; 38 Roger Bailey; 41 Robbie Beckett; 37 John Burke; 36 Mike Farmer; 44 Marvin Freeman; 48 John Habyan; 13 Ryan Hawblitzel; 40 Darren Holmes; 16 Curtis Leskanic; 43 Mike Munoz; 17 David Nied; 28 Lance Painter; 39 Steve Reed; 23 Bryan Rekar; 42 Armando Reynoso; 30 Kevin Ritz; 18 Bruce Ruffin; 20 Bill Swift; 32 Mark Thompson; 19 Jamey Wright	**Catchers**: 27 Jorge Brito; 27 Steve Decker; 34 Jayhawk Owens; 15 Jeff Reed; **Infielders**: 6 Jason Bates; 12 Pedro Castellano; 9 Vinny Castilla; 14 Andrés Galarraga; 5 Neifi Pérez; 22 Walt Weiss; 21 Eric Young	**Outfielders**: 29 Eric Anthony; 10 Dante Bichette; 26 Ellis Burks; 44 Alan Cockrell; 11 Angel Echevarria; 1 Trent Hubbard; 1 Terry Jones; 3 Quinton McCracken; 29 Harvey Pulliam; 27 Milt Thompson; 35 John Vander Wal; 33 Larry Walker	**Manager**: 25 Don Baylor; **Coaches**: 45 Frank Funk (pitching); 2 Gene Glynn (third base); 24 Ken Griffey (hitting/first base); 47 Jackie Moore (bench); 46 Paul Zuvella (bullpen)

== Player stats ==
= Indicates team leader

= Indicates league leader

=== Batting ===
==== Starters by position ====
Note: Pos = Position; G = Games played; AB = At bats; H = Hits; Avg. = Batting average; HR = Home runs; RBI = Runs batted in

Pos	Player	G	AB	H	Avg.	HR	RBI
C	Jeff Reed	116	341	97	.284	8	37
1B	Andrés Galarraga	159	626	190	.304	47	150
2B	Eric Young	141	568	184	.324	8	74
SS	Walt Weiss	155	517	146	.282	8	48
3B	Vinny Castilla	160	629	191	.304	40	113
LF	Ellis Burks	156	613	211	.344	40	128
CF	Quinton McCracken	124	283	82	.290	3	40
RF	Dante Bichette	159	633	198	.313	31	141

==== Other batters ====
Note: G = Games played; AB = At bats; H = Hits; Avg. = Batting average; HR = Home runs; RBI = Runs batted in

Player	G	AB	H	Avg.	HR	RBI
Larry Walker	83	272	75	.276	18	58
Jayhawk Owens	73	180	43	.239	4	17
Jason Bates	88	160	33	.206	1	9
John Vander Wal	104	151	38	.252	5	31
Eric Anthony	32	62	15	.242	4	9
Trent Hubbard	45	60	13	.217	1	12
Neifi Pérez	17	45	7	.156	0	3
Steve Decker	10	25	8	.320	1	8
Angel Echevarria	26	21	6	.286	0	6
Pedro Castellano	13	17	2	.118	0	2
Harvey Pulliam	10	15	2	.133	0	0
Milt Thompson	14	15	1	.067	0	2
Jorge Brito	8	14	1	.071	0	0
Terry Jones	12	10	3	.300	0	1
Alan Cockrell	9	8	2	.250	0	2

=== Pitching ===
==== Starting pitchers ====
Note: G = Games pitched; IP = Innings pitched; W = Wins; L = Losses; ERA = Earned run average; SO = Strikeouts

Player	G	IP	W	L	ERA	SO
Kevin Ritz	35	213.0	17	11	5.28	105
Mark Thompson	34	169.2	9	11	5.30	99
Armando Reynoso	30	168.2	8	9	4.96	88
Marvin Freeman	26	129.2	7	9	6.04	71
Jamey Wright	16	91.1	4	4	4.93	45
Bryan Rekar	14	58.1	2	4	8.95	25

==== Other pitchers ====
Note: G = Games pitched; IP = Innings pitched; W = Wins; L = Losses; ERA = Earned run average; SO = Strikeouts

Player	G	IP	W	L	ERA	SO
Roger Bailey	24	83.2	2	3	6.24	45
Mike Farmer	7	28.0	0	1	7.71	16
Bill Swift	7	18.1	1	1	5.40	5

==== Relief pitchers ====
Note: G = Games pitched; W = Wins; L = Losses; SV = Saves; ERA = Earned run average; SO = Strikeouts

Player	G	W	L	SV	ERA	SO
Bruce Ruffin	71	7	5	24	4.00	74
Curtis Leskanic	70	7	5	6	6.23	76
Steve Reed	70	4	3	0	3.96	51
Darren Holmes	62	5	4	1	3.97	73
Mike Munoz	54	2	2	0	6.65	45
Lance Painter	34	4	2	0	5.86	48
John Habyan	19	1	1	0	7.13	25
John Burke	11	2	1	0	7.47	19
Ryan Hawblitzel	8	0	1	0	6.00	7
Garvin Alston	6	1	0	0	9.00	5
David Nied	6	0	2	0	13.50	4
Robbie Beckett	5	0	0	0	13.50	6

== Awards and honors ==
- Eric Young, NL Leader, Stolen Bases

All-Star Game

- Dante Bichette, OF, Starter
- Ellis Burks, OF, Reserve
- Eric Young, 2B, Reserve

== Farm system ==
Level	Team	League	Manager
AAA	Colorado Springs Sky Sox	Pacific Coast League	Brad Mills
AA	New Haven Ravens	Eastern League	Bill Hayes
A	Salem Avalanche	Carolina League	Bill McGuire
A	Asheville Tourists	South Atlantic League	P. J. Carey
A-Short Season	Portland Rockies	Northwest League	Ron Gideon
Rookie	AZL Rockies	Arizona League	Jim Eppard

Records
Preceded by 1995	Colorado Rockies seasons 1996	Succeeded by 1997
