= Rob Lukachyk =

American baseball player (born 1968)

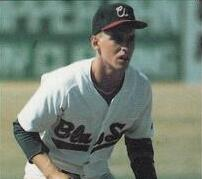
- Lukachyk with the Utica Blue Sox c. 1988
- Pinch hitter
- Born: July 24, 1968 (age 57); Jersey City, New Jersey
- Batted: Left Threw: Right

MLB debut
- July 5, 1996, for the Montreal Expos

Last MLB appearance
- July 6, 1996, for the Montreal Expos

MLB statistics
- Games: 2
- At bats: 2
- Hits: 0
- Stats at Baseball Reference

Teams
- Montreal Expos (1996)

Robert James Lukachyk (born July 24, 1968) is an American former professional baseball player. Lukachyk played briefly for the Montreal Expos of Major League Baseball (MLB) during their 1996 season.

== Career ==
Lukachyk was selected by the Chicago White Sox in the 10th round of the 1987 MLB draft out of Brookdale Community College in New Jersey. After that, he signed as a free agent with the Baltimore Orioles (1993) and Detroit Tigers (1994) before joining the Expos organization.

Originally a corner infielder and outfielder in the minors, Lukachyk made two appearances as a pinch-hitter for Montreal and went hitless in two at bats.

In between, Lukachyk played winter ball with the Pastora de Occidente club of the Venezuelan League in the 1996–97 season.

Lukachyk eventually moved on to play for the Somerset Patriots of the independent Atlantic League of Professional Baseball. After his playing days were over, he moved on to work in their front office.

Rob Lukachyk is now a baseball instructor at Frozen Ropes in Union, NJ.

In a 12-season minor league career, he posted a .267 batting average with 104 home runs and 586 runs batted in in 1,185 games.

== Sources ==
- Career statistics from Baseball Reference · Baseball Reference (Minors) · Retrosheet · Baseball Almanac, or Retrosheet
