= Steve Bourgeois =

American baseball player

- Pitcher
- Born: August 4, 1972 (age 53); Lutcher, Louisiana
- Batted: Right Threw: Right

MLB debut
- April 3, 1996, for the San Francisco Giants

Last MLB appearance
- September 28, 1996, for the San Francisco Giants

MLB statistics
- Win–loss record: 1–3
- Earned run average: 6.30
- Strikeouts: 17
- Stats at Baseball Reference

Teams
- San Francisco Giants (1996)

Steven James Bourgeois (born August 4, 1972), is an American former professional baseball pitcher. He played in 1996 with the San Francisco Giants of Major League Baseball (MLB). Bourgeois batted and threw right-handed. Bourgeois had a 1–3 record, with a 6.30 ERA, in 15 games, in his one-year career. He was drafted by the Giants in the 21st round of the 1993 draft.

Due to his participation as a replacement player during the 1994 Major League Baseball strike, he was not eligible to join the MLB Players Union.
