= Rick Wilkins (baseball) =

American baseball player (born 1967)

- Catcher
- Born: June 4, 1967 (age 59); Jacksonville, Florida, U.S.
- Batted: Left Threw: Right

MLB debut
- June 6, 1991, for the Chicago Cubs

Last MLB appearance
- October 3, 2001, for the San Diego Padres

MLB statistics
- Batting average: .244
- Home runs: 81
- Runs batted in: 275
- Stats at Baseball Reference

Teams
- Chicago Cubs (1991–1995); Houston Astros (1995–1996); San Francisco Giants (1996–1997); Seattle Mariners (1997–1998); New York Mets (1998); Los Angeles Dodgers (1999); St. Louis Cardinals (2000); San Diego Padres (2001)

Richard David Wilkins (born June 4, 1967) is an American former professional baseball catcher. He played 11 seasons in Major League Baseball (MLB) between 1991 and 2001 for the Chicago Cubs, Houston Astros, San Francisco Giants, Seattle Mariners, New York Mets, Los Angeles Dodgers, St. Louis Cardinals, and San Diego Padres.

== Early life ==
Wilkins was born in Jacksonville, Florida. He graduated from The Bolles School where he was a district champ in both baseball and football his senior year of high school in 1985. He received an athletic scholarship from Furman University.

== Baseball career ==
Wilkins was selected in the 23rd round by the Chicago Cubs in the 1986 Major League Baseball draft. Prior to his call to the big leagues Wilkins was rated the 70th best prospect by Baseball America and at the age of 24 he made his major league debut on June 6, 1991. By 1993, he was named the opening day catcher of the Chicago Cubs, where he played in 136 games while posting a batting average .303 and clubbing 30 home runs along with 73 RBIs making him the 4th member of the .300/30 club for catchers in Major League Baseball history. Since then 5 more members have made the elusive club. On October 3, 2001, Wilkins ended his professional playing career going 1 for 1 with 2 RBIs with the San Diego Padres.
