= Dax Jones =

American baseball player (born 1970)

- Outfielder
- Born: August 4, 1970 (age 54); Pittsburgh, Pennsylvania
- Batted: Right Threw: Right

MLB debut
- July 11, 1996, for the San Francisco Giants

Last MLB appearance
- September 28, 1996, for the San Francisco Giants

MLB statistics
- Batting average: .172
- Home runs: 1
- Runs batted in: 7
- Stats at Baseball Reference

Teams
- San Francisco Giants (1996)

Dax Xenos Jones (born August 4, 1970) is a former Major League Baseball player for the San Francisco Giants. He was drafted by the Giants in the 8th round (220th pick overall) of the 1990 amateur draft. In 1996, his only year in the majors, he hit .172 (10 for 58) with one home run (inside the park), two triples, and two stolen bases. He was a career .284 hitter in the minor leagues over 8 years. His highest batting average in the minor leagues was .309 in Phoenix during the 1996 season. He stole 98 bases in his 8-year minor league career, his best year being 1992 when he combined for 20 between Clinton and Shreveport.

Jones' first and middle name were taken from the lead character in the 1970 film The Adventurers.
