= Derek Aucoin =

Canadian baseball player (1970–2020)

- Pitcher
- Born: March 27, 1970; Lachine, Quebec, Canada
- Died: December 26, 2020 (aged 50); Montreal, Quebec, Canada
- Batted: Right Threw: Right

MLB debut
- May 21, 1996, for the Montreal Expos

Last MLB appearance
- May 25, 1996, for the Montreal Expos

MLB statistics
- Win–loss record: 0–1
- Earned run average: 3.38
- Strikeouts: 1
- Stats at Baseball Reference

Teams
- Montreal Expos (1996)

Derek Alfred Aucoin (March 27, 1970 – December 26, 2020) was a Canadian professional baseball pitcher. He pitched in two games in Major League Baseball (MLB) for the Montreal Expos during the 1996 season. He had a 0–1 record, in 2 2/3 innings, with a 3.38 ERA. He was signed by the Montreal Expos as an amateur free agent in 1989.

== Professional baseball career ==
=== Montreal Expos ===
In his first professional season, 1989, with the Gulf Coast League Expos he went 2–1 with a 2.66 ERA in seven games, three starts.

While with the Short-Season Jamestown Expos in 1990 Aucoin compiled a record of 1–3 with a 4.46 ERA in eight games, all starts.

His next two seasons, 1991 and 1992, were spent at the Class-A level. In 1991, he went 3–6 with a 4.28 ERA in 41 games, four starts with the Sumter Flyers. In 1992, he went 3–2 with a 3.00 ERA in 39 games, two starts with the Rockford Expos.

Aucoin was promoted to the Advanced-A West Palm Beach Expos in 1993. He compiled a record of 4–4 with a 4.24 ERA in 38 games, six starts.

In 1994 Aucoin split the season between West Palm Beach and the Double-A Harrisburg Senators of the Eastern League He went a combined 3–4 with a 2.82 ERA in 38 games. Staying at Harrisburg in 1995 he went 2–4 with a 4.96 ERA in 29 games.

Aucoin split the 1996 season between the Expos and the Triple-A Ottawa Lynx of the International League. With Ottawa, he went 3–5 with a 3.96 ERA in 52 games. On 21 May 1996 he made his Major League debut against the San Francisco Giants. In 2/3 of an inning, he gave up one earned run and registered a loss. He would finish his Major League Career going 0–1 with a 3.38 ERA in two games.

With West Palm Beach and Ottawa in 1997 he went a combined 0–1 with a very poor 11.37 ERA through 25 games.

=== New York Mets ===
In his final season, 1998, Aucoin split the season between the Gulf Coast League Mets, the Advanced-A St. Lucie Mets, the Double-A Binghamton Mets and the Triple-A Norfolk Tides. He went a combined 1–0 with a 6.21 ERA in 28 games.

== Personal life and death ==
In April 2011, Derek married Isabelle Rochefort. They had a son, Dawson Paul Aucoin, named after Hall of Fame player Andre Dawson.

He died from brain cancer on 26 December 2020 at the age of 50.
