= 1996 Philadelphia Phillies season =

Major League Baseball season

1996 Philadelphia Phillies
- League: National League
- Division: East
- Ballpark: Veterans Stadium
- City: Philadelphia
- Record: 67–95 (.414)
- Divisional place: 5th
- Owners: Bill Giles
- General managers: Lee Thomas
- Managers: Jim Fregosi
- Television: WPHL-TV; PRISM; SportsChannel Philadelphia (Harry Kalas, Richie Ashburn, Andy Musser, Chris Wheeler, Garry Maddox, Todd Kalas)
- Radio: WGMP (Harry Kalas, Richie Ashburn, Andy Musser, Chris Wheeler)

The 1996 Philadelphia Phillies season was the 114th season in the history of the franchise. The Phillies finished fifth in the National League East with a record of 67 wins and 95 losses. They also hosted the 1996 Major League Baseball All-Star Game.

== Offseason ==
- October 6, 1995: Jeff Juden and Tommy Eason (minors) were traded by the Phillies to the San Francisco Giants for Mike Benjamin.
- December 6, 1995: Paul Quantrill was traded by the Phillies to the Toronto Blue Jays for Howard Battle with Ricardo Jordan.
- January 29, 1996: Heathcliff Slocumb, Larry Wimberly (minors) and Rick Holyfield (minors) were traded by the Phillies to the Boston Red Sox for Glenn Murray, Ken Ryan, and Lee Tinsley.
- February 17, 1996: Terry Mulholland was signed as a free agent by the Phillies.

== Regular season ==
- The Phillies were hit for the cycle against on July 3 during a game against their rival New York Mets. Alex Ochoa hit for the cycle against the Phillies when the Mets won at Veterans Stadium. This was the first time since 1951 that a player had hit for the cycle against the Phillies.

=== Season standings ===
NL East
Team	W	L	Pct.	GB	Home	Road
Atlanta Braves	96	66	.593	—	56‍–‍25	40‍–‍41
Montreal Expos	88	74	.543	8	50‍–‍31	38‍–‍43
Florida Marlins	80	82	.494	16	52‍–‍29	28‍–‍53
New York Mets	71	91	.438	25	42‍–‍39	29‍–‍52
Philadelphia Phillies	67	95	.414	29	35‍–‍46	32‍–‍49

=== Record vs. opponents ===
1996 National League record Source: MLB Standings Grid – 1996
Team	ATL	CHC	CIN	COL	FLA	HOU	LAD	MON	NYM	PHI	PIT	SD	SF	STL
Atlanta	—	7–5	7–5	5–7	6–7	6–6	5–7	10–3	7–6	9–4	9–3	9–4	7–5	9–4
Chicago	5–7	—	5–8	5–7	6–6	5–8	8–5	6–6	7–5	7–6	4–9	6–6	7–5	5–8
Cincinnati	5–7	8–5	—	7–6	3–9	7–6	4–8	3–9	6–6	10–2	5–8	9–3	9–4	5–8
Colorado	7–5	7–5	6–7	—	5–8	8–5	6–7	3–9	7–5	6–6	7–5	8–5	5–8	8–4
Florida	7–6	6–6	9–3	8–5	—	7–5	6–7	5–8	7–6	6–7	5–7	3–9	5–7	6–6
Houston	6–6	8–5	6–7	5–8	5–7	—	6–6	4–9	8–4	10–2	8–5	6–6	8–4	2–11
Los Angeles	7–5	5–8	8–4	7–6	7–6	6–6	—	9–3	8–4	7–6	6–6	5–8	7–6	8–4
Montreal	3–10	6–6	9–3	9–3	8–5	9–4	3–9	—	7–6	6–7	7–5	4–8	9–4	8–4
New York	6–7	5–7	6–6	5–7	6–7	4–8	4–8	6–7	—	7–6	8–5	3–10	6–6	5–7
Philadelphia	4–9	6–7	2–10	6–6	7–6	2–10	6–7	7–6	6–7	—	7–5	4–8	6–6	4–8
Pittsburgh	3–9	9–4	8–5	5–7	7–5	5–8	6–6	5–7	5–8	5–7	—	4–9	8–4	3–10
San Diego	4–9	6–6	3–9	5–8	9–3	6–6	8–5	8–4	10–3	8–4	9–4	—	11–2	4–8
San Francisco	5–7	5–7	4–9	8–5	7–5	4–8	6–7	4–9	6–6	6–6	4–8	2–11	—	7–6
St. Louis	4–9	8–5	8–5	4–8	6–6	11–2	4–8	4–8	7–5	8–4	10–3	8–4	6–7	—

=== Game log ===
1996 Game Log: 67–95 (Home: 35–46; Away: 32–49)
April: 13–11 (Home: 4–6; Away: 9–5)

#	Date	Opponent	Score	Win	Loss	Save	Attendance	Record
1	April 2	Rockies	3–5	Ritz	**Fernandez** (0–1)	—	36,751	0–1
2	April 3	Rockies	3–1	**Grace** (1–0)	Freeman	**Bottalico** (1)	15,648	1–1
3	April 4	Rockies	7–4	**Mulholland** (1–0)	Rekar	**Bottalico** (2)	16,220	2–1
4	April 5	Reds	5–6 (10)	Shaw	**Borland** (0–1)	Moore	17,318	2–2
5	April 6	Reds	4–8	Salkeld	**Hunter** (0–1)	—	17,958	2–3
6	April 8	@ Pirates	6–3	**Fernandez** (1–1)	Neagle	—	41,416	3–3
7	April 10	@ Pirates	7–6	**Grace** (2–0)	Christiansen	**Bottalico** (3)	7,075	4–3
8	April 11	@ Cardinals	1–2	Benes	**Mulholland** (1–1)	Mathews	23,412	4–4
9	April 12	@ Cardinals	1–6	Urbani	**Williams** (0–1)	—	26,753	4–5
10	April 13	@ Cardinals	4–2	**Hunter** (1–1)	Fossas	**Bottalico** (4)	28,913	5–5
11	April 14	@ Cardinals	5–6	Mathews	**Fernandez** (1–2)	Eckersley	27,545	5–6
12	April 16	@ Expos	6–7	Rojas	**Springer** (0–1)	—	8,510	5–7
13	April 17	@ Expos	9–3	**Mulholland** (2–1)	Cormier	—	8,728	6–7
14	April 18	@ Expos	9–8	**Bottalico** (1–0)	Rojas	—	8,316	7–7
15	April 19	Cardinals	0–1	Bailey	**Springer** (0–2)	Eckersley	25,614	7–8
16	April 20	Cardinals	0–1	Benes	**Bottalico** (1–1)	Eckersley	23,630	7–9
17	April 21	Cardinals	4–2	**Grace** (3–0)	Benes	**Bottalico** (5)	32,896	8–9
18	April 22	Pirates	3–9	Darwin	**Mulholland** (2–2)	—	17,604	8–10
19	April 23	Pirates	6–2	**Springer** (1–2)	Wagner	**Ryan** (1)	19,254	9–10
20	April 24	@ Rockies	10–8	**Borland** (1–1)	Reed	**Bottalico** (6)	48,047	10–10
21	April 25	@ Rockies	7–1	**Fernandez** (2–2)	Thompson	**Ryan** (2)	48,033	11–10
22	April 26	@ Reds	2–0	**Grace** (4–0)	Burba	**Bottalico** (7)	21,842	12–10
23	April 27	@ Reds	3–2	**Leiper** (1–0)	Portugal	**Bottalico** (8)	22,555	13–10
24	April 30	@ Marlins	2–7	Rapp	**Williams** (0–2)	Nen	15,252	13–11

May: 13–15 (Home: 6–7; Away: 7–8)

#	Date	Opponent	Score	Win	Loss	Save	Attendance	Record
25	May 1	@ Marlins	6–5	**Ryan** (1–0)	Leiter	**Bottalico** (9)	14,672	14–11
26	May 2	@ Marlins	2–0	**Grace** (5–0)	Brown	**Bottalico** (10)	14,888	15–11
27	May 3	@ Braves	6–3	**Mulholland** (3–2)	Maddux	**Bottalico** (11)	39,697	16–11
28	May 4	@ Braves	3–6	McMichael	**Ryan** (1–1)	Clontz	44,429	16–12
29	May 5	@ Braves	8–11	Smoltz	**Williams** (0–3)	—	35,471	16–13
30	May 6	Astros	5–11	Drabek	**Hunter** (1–2)	—	15,906	16–14
31	May 7	Astros	5–7	Young	**Springer** (1–3)	Jones	16,569	16–15
32	May 8	Astros	2–1 (10)	**Ryan** (2–1)	Tabaka	—	16,284	17–15
33	May 10	Braves	0–11	Smoltz	**Mulholland** (3–3)	—	27,068	17–16
34	May 11	Braves	3–11	Avery	**Mimbs** (0–1)	—	22,823	17–17
35	May 12	Braves	6–0	**Grace** (6–0)	Maddux	—	32,314	18–17
36	May 13	Giants	1–2	Gardner	**Fernandez** (2–3)	Beck	18,758	18–18
37	May 14	Giants	7–0	**Schilling** (1–0)	Fernandez	—	18,774	19–18
38	May 15	Giants	7–6 (10)	**Bottalico** (2–1)	Beck	—	25,085	20–18
39	May 16	@ Dodgers	2–8	Valdez	**Mimbs** (0–2)	—	25,960	20–19
40	May 17	@ Dodgers	3–6	Nomo	**Grace** (6–1)	Worrell	54,304	20–20
41	May 18	@ Dodgers	2–7	Astacio	**Fernandez** (2–4)	Osuna	51,064	20–21
42	May 19	@ Dodgers	5–4	**Leiper** (2–0)	Radinsky	**Bottalico** (12)	38,178	21–21
43	May 21	@ Padres	5–4	**Mulholland** (4–3)	Bergman	**Bottalico** (13)	11,954	22–21
44	May 22	@ Padres	2–5	Hamilton	**Grace** (6–2)	Hoffman	13,118	22–22
45	May 23	@ Padres	5–7	Sanders	**Springer** (1–4)	Hoffman	16,632	22–23
46	May 24	@ Giants	5–1	**Schilling** (2–0)	Watson	—	11,917	23–23
47	May 25	@ Giants	2–3	Gardner	**Williams** (0–4)	Beck	16,874	23–24
48	May 26	@ Giants	10–1	**Mulholland** (5–3)	Fernandez	**Bottalico** (14)	26,234	24–24
49	May 28	Dodgers	9–3	**Grace** (7–2)	Valdez	—	17,186	25–24
50	May 29	Dodgers	2–3 (11)	Guthrie	**Bottalico** (2–2)	Worrell	24,120	25–25
51	May 30	Dodgers	3–2	**Borland** (2–1)	Worrell	—	29,287	26–25
52	May 31	Padres	2–4	Ashby	**Mulholland** (5–4)	Hoffman	22,110	26–26

June: 6–21 (Home: 5–6; Away: 1–15)

#	Date	Opponent	Score	Win	Loss	Save	Attendance	Record
53	June 1	Padres	3–8	Bergman	**Mimbs** (0–3)	—	27,623	26–27
54	June 2	Padres	9–8 (12)	**Borland** (3–1)	Hoffman	—	32,035	27–27
55	June 3	@ Cubs	3–4	Patterson	**Ryan** (2–2)	—	26,320	27–28
56	June 4	@ Cubs	12–3	**Williams** (1–4)	Bullinger	—	15,431	28–28
57	June 5	@ Cubs	6–9	Adams	**Borland** (3–2)	Wendell	18,189	28–29
58	June 7	@ Astros	5–11	Reynolds	**Crawford** (0–1)	—	22,585	28–30
59	June 8	@ Astros	3–7	Wagner	**Springer** (1–5)	—	23,739	28–31
60	June 9	@ Astros	1–2	Young	**Williams** (1–5)	Jones	30,180	28–32
61	June 10	Cubs	1–2	Navarro	**Mulholland** (5–5)	—	19,588	28–33
62	June 11	Cubs	2–9	Campbell	**Munoz** (0–1)	—	23,220	28–34
63	June 12	Cubs	4–3	**Fernandez** (3–4)	Castillo	**Bottalico** (15)	27,287	29–34
64	June 13	@ Rockies	1–4	Rekar	**Schilling** (2–1)	Ruffin	48,018	29–35
65	June 14	@ Rockies	6–10	Painter	**Springer** (1–6)	—	48,006	29–36
66	June 15	@ Rockies	2–4	Reynoso	**Mulholland** (5–6)	Ruffin	48,023	29–37
67	June 16	@ Rockies	3–11	Ritz	**Munoz** (0–2)	—	48,041	29–38
68	June 18	@ Cardinals	2–3	Osborne	**Fernandez** (3–5)	Eckersley	31,311	29–39
69	June 19	@ Cardinals	2–3	Benes	**Bottalico** (2–3)	—	34,612	29–40
70	June 21	Rockies	4–3 (10)	**Borland** (4–2)	Ruffin	—	25,085	30–40
71	June 22	Rockies	5–4	**Blazier** (1–0)	Hawblitzel	**Bottalico** (16)	28,604	31–40
72	June 23	Rockies	4–7	Freeman	**Fernandez** (3–6)	Ruffin	33,385	31–41
73	June 24	@ Reds	0–7	Portugal	**Schilling** (2–2)	—	20,835	31–42
74	June 25	@ Reds	1–9	Burba	**Quirico** (0–1)	—	—	31–43
75	June 25	@ Reds	1–3	Jarvis	**Mimbs** (0–4)	Smith	23,369	31–44
76	June 26	@ Reds	2–4	Salkeld	**Williams** (1–6)	Brantley	32,286	31–45
77	June 28	Expos	7–3	**Mulholland** (6–6)	Urbina	**Ryan** (3)	21,703	32–45
78	June 29	Expos	0–1	Fassero	**Schilling** (2–3)	—	22,898	32–46
79	June 30	Expos	5–6	Rojas	**Bottalico** (2–4)	Dyer	24,949	32–47

July: 11–16 (Home: 6–6; Away: 5–10)

#	Date	Opponent	Score	Win	Loss	Save	Attendance	Record
80	July 1	Mets	6–4	**Williams** (2–6)	Jones	**Ryan** (4)	20,779	33–47
81	July 2	Mets	3–2	**Springer** (2–6)	Harnisch	**Bottalico** (17)	20,890	34–47
82	July 3	Mets	6–10	Byrd	**Ryan** (2–3)	Henry	43,158	34–48
83	July 4	Marlins	8–5	**Blazier** (2–0)	Rapp	**Bottalico** (18)	17,460	35–48
84	July 5	Marlins	7–4	**Borland** (5–2)	Miller	**Bottalico** (19)	46,872	36–48
85	July 6	Marlins	2–1	**Williams** (3–6)	Brown	**Bottalico** (20)	22,278	37–48
86	July 7	Marlins	4–7 (10)	Mathews	**Jordan** (0–1)	Nen	28,183	37–49
87	July 11	@ Expos	3–2	**Schilling** (3–3)	Fassero	**Bottalico** (21)	17,546	38–49
88	July 12	@ Expos	5–3	**Mulholland** (7–6)	Martinez	—	14,322	39–49
89	July 13	@ Expos	6–2	**Mimbs** (1–4)	Cormier	—	30,215	40–49
90	July 14	@ Expos	2–5	Scott	**Williams** (3–7)	Rojas	31,515	40–50
91	July 15	@ Mets	5–7	Dipoto	**Springer** (2–7)	Henry	15,549	40–51
92	July 16	@ Mets	3–6	Clark	**Schilling** (3–4)	Franco	18,478	40–52
93	July 17	@ Mets	2–3	Mlicki	**Frey** (0–1)	—	29,459	40–53
94	July 18	@ Marlins	0–7	Brown	**Mimbs** (1–5)	—	16,521	40–54
95	July 19	@ Marlins	2–11	Hammond	**Williams** (3–8)	—	19,123	40–55
96	July 20	@ Marlins	4–7	Rapp	**Springer** (2–8)	Nen	24,336	40–56
97	July 21	@ Marlins	12–3	**Schilling** (4–4)	Burkett	**Bottalico** (22)	20,873	41–56
98	July 22	Reds	2–5	Portugal	**Mulholland** (7–7)	Brantley	—	41–57
99	July 22	Reds	3–5	Smith	**Ryan** (2–4)	Brantley	22,808	41–58
100	July 23	Reds	3–5	Jarvis	**Mimbs** (1–6)	—	23,100	41–59
101	July 24	Reds	1–3	Burba	**Williams** (3–9)	Brantley	27,352	41–60
102	July 25	@ Pirates	4–6	Miceli	**Springer** (2–9)	Cordova	12,163	41–61
103	July 26	@ Pirates	4–7	Ericks	**Bottalico** (2–5)	Plesac	17,239	41–62
104	July 27	@ Pirates	2–1	**Mulholland** (8–7)	Parris	—	23,121	42–62
105	July 28	@ Pirates	8–12	Ericks	**Borland** (5–3)	—	15,189	42–63
106	July 30	Cardinals	8–7	**Ryan** (3–4)	Mathews	—	20,166	43–63

August: 11–19 (Home: 6–12; Away: 5–7)

#	Date	Opponent	Score	Win	Loss	Save	Attendance	Record
107	August 1	Cardinals	2–1	**Springer** (3–9)	Osborne	**Ryan** (5)	—	44–63
108	August 1	Cardinals	1–7	Benes	**Mimbs** (1–7)	—	22,934	44–64
109	August 2	Pirates	3–8	Wilkins	**Blazier** (2–1)	—	24,505	44–65
110	August 3	Pirates	7–6	**Bottalico** (3–5)	Plesac	—	22,690	45–65
111	August 4	Pirates	4–2	**Williams** (4–9)	Miceli	**Ryan** (6)	25,498	46–65
112	August 5	Pirates	3–0	**Schilling** (5–4)	Neagle	—	20,337	47–65
113	August 6	@ Braves	4–10	Bielecki	**Springer** (3–10)	—	32,036	47–66
114	August 7	@ Braves	1–14 (8)	Smoltz	**Munoz** (0–3)	—	29,920	47–67
115	August 8	@ Braves	4–1	**Beech** (1–0)	Maddux	**Bottalico** (23)	32,401	48–67
116	August 9	Astros	1–5	Reynolds	**West** (0–1)	—	21,780	48–68
117	August 10	Astros	1–3	Hampton	**Schilling** (5–5)	Wagner	18,486	48–69
118	August 11	Astros	5–10	Kile	**Williams** (4–10)	—	24,150	48–70
119	August 13	Braves	0–2	Maddux	**Hunter** (1–3)	—	—	48–71
120	August 13	Braves	2–5	Hartgraves	**Beech** (1–1)	Wohlers	25,196	48–72
121	August 14	Braves	4–1	**West** (1–1)	Glavine	**Bottalico** (24)	28,206	49–72
122	August 15	Braves	5–8	Wade	**Schilling** (5–6)	—	28,011	49–73
123	August 16	Giants	4–6	VanLandingham	**Williams** (4–11)	Beck	20,163	49–74
124	August 17	Giants	4–8	Watson	**Hunter** (1–4)	Beck	24,522	49–75
125	August 18	Giants	7–6	**Borland** (6–3)	Gardner	**Bottalico** (25)	24,480	50–75
126	August 20	@ Dodgers	3–1	**Jordan** (1–1)	Osuna	**Bottalico** (26)	35,457	51–75
127	August 21	@ Dodgers	6–0	**Schilling** (6–6)	Nomo	—	39,502	52–75
128	August 22	@ Dodgers	5–8	Astacio	**Williams** (4–12)	Worrell	29,608	52–76
129	August 23	@ Padres	7–4	**Hunter** (2–4)	Worrell	**Bottalico** (27)	22,102	53–76
130	August 24	@ Padres	1–7	Hamilton	**Beech** (1–2)	—	31,023	53–77
131	August 25	@ Padres	2–11	Sanders	**West** (1–2)	—	30,036	53–78
132	August 26	@ Giants	0–1	VanLandingham	**Schilling** (6–7)	Beck	8,640	53–79
133	August 27	@ Giants	3–2	**Williams** (5–12)	Bautista	**Bottalico** (28)	9,549	54–79
134	August 28	@ Giants	6–7	Dewey	**Jordan** (1–2)	Beck	16,223	54–80
135	August 30	Dodgers	6–7 (12)	Dreifort	**Parrett** (0–1)	Worrell	22,129	54–81
136	August 31	Dodgers	7–11	Valdez	**Schilling** (6–8)	Osuna	24,821	54–82

September: 13–13 (Home: 8–9; Away: 5–4)

#	Date	Opponent	Score	Win	Loss	Save	Attendance	Record
137	September 1	Dodgers	6–3	**Williams** (6–12)	Worrell	**Bottalico** (29)	24,959	55–82
138	September 2	Padres	1–5	Valenzuela	**Hunter** (2–5)	—	15,263	55–83
139	September 3	Padres	8–2	**Mimbs** (2–7)	Hamilton	**Ryan** (7)	16,797	56–83
140	September 4	Padres	1–2	Sanders	**Beech** (1–3)	Hoffman	18,754	56–84
141	September 5	Cubs	6–1	**Schilling** (7–8)	Castillo	—	18,164	57–84
142	September 6	Cubs	4–6	Bullinger	**Ryan** (3–5)	Wendell	17,803	57–85
143	September 7	Cubs	4–2	**Hunter** (3–5)	Bottenfield	**Bottalico** (30)	18,021	58–85
144	September 8	Cubs	3–5	Navarro	**Mimbs** (2–8)	Wendell	27,600	58–86
145	September 10	@ Astros	3–4	Morman	**Schilling** (7–9)	Hernandez	12,700	58–87
146	September 11	@ Astros	10–8	**Parrett** (1–1)	Holt	**Bottalico** (31)	17,300	59–87
147	September 12	@ Astros	1–4	Kile	**Williams** (6–13)	—	16,103	59–88
148	September 13	@ Cubs	2–4	Trachsel	**Hunter** (3–6)	Wendell	23,048	59–89
149	September 14	@ Cubs	6–2	**Mimbs** (3–8)	Navarro	**Ryan** (8)	36,290	60–89
150	September 15	@ Cubs	6–1	**Schilling** (8–9)	Foster	—	24,697	61–89
151	September 17	Marlins	5–11	Rapp	**Beech** (1–4)	—	15,507	61–90
152	September 18	Marlins	8–6	**Borland** (7–3)	Miller	**Bottalico** (32)	17,158	62–90
153	September 19	Mets	2–7	Clark	**Hunter** (3–7)	—	16,689	62–91
154	September 20	Mets	2–5	Wilson	**Mimbs** (3–9)	Franco	22,001	62–92
155	September 21	Mets	2–1	**Schilling** (9–9)	Harnisch	—	23,283	63–92
156	September 22	Mets	4–3	**Bottalico** (4–5)	Wallace	—	27,672	64–92
157	September 24	Expos	2–6	Juden	**Williams** (6–14)	Rojas	16,044	64–93
158	September 25	Expos	3–1	**West** (2–2)	Paniagua	**Bottalico** (33)	17,544	65–93
159	September 26	Expos	2–5	Daal	**Schilling** (9–10)	Rojas	16,587	65–94
160	September 27	@ Mets	6–5	**Jordan** (2–2)	Dipoto	**Bottalico** (34)	15,889	66–94
161	September 28	@ Mets	2–4	Person	**Maduro** (0–1)	Wallace	16,801	66–95
162	September 29	@ Mets	9–5	**Blazier** (3–1)	Fyhrie	—	21,975	67–95

Legend: = Win = Loss
Bold = Phillies team member

=== Detailed records ===
National League
Opponent	W	L	WP	RS	RA
NL East
Atlanta Braves	4	9	0.308	46	83
Florida Marlins	7	6	0.538	62	74
Montreal Expos	7	6	0.538	59	52
New York Mets	6	7	0.462	52	62
**Philadelphia Phillies**					
Total	24	28	0.462	219	271
NL Central
Chicago Cubs	6	7	0.462	59	51
Cincinnati Reds	2	10	0.167	27	57
Houston Astros	2	10	0.167	42	73
Pittsburgh Pirates	7	5	0.583	57	62
St. Louis Cardinals	4	8	0.333	30	41
Total	21	40	0.344	215	284
NL West
Colorado Rockies	6	6	0.500	55	62
Los Angeles Dodgers	6	7	0.462	59	63
San Diego Padres	4	8	0.333	46	67
San Francisco Giants	6	6	0.500	56	43
Total	22	27	0.449	216	235
Season Total	67	95	0.414	650	790

Month	Games	Won	Lost	Win %	RS	RA
April	24	13	11	0.542	107	100
May	28	13	15	0.464	118	132
June	27	6	21	0.222	94	148
July	27	11	16	0.407	115	140
August	30	11	19	0.367	108	162
September	26	13	13	0.500	108	108
Total	162	67	95	0.414	650	790

	Games	Won	Lost	Win %	RS	RA
Home	81	35	46	0.432	313	379
Away	81	32	49	0.395	337	411
Total	162	67	95	0.414	650	790

=== Notable transactions ===
- April 16, 1996: Rafael Quirico was signed as a free agent by the Phillies.
- May 6, 1996: Rubén Amaro, Jr. was signed as a free agent by the Phillies.
- June 4, 1996: Jimmy Rollins was drafted by the Phillies in the 2nd round of the 1996 Major League Baseball draft. Player signed June 24, 1996.
- June 17, 1996: Mark Whiten was released by the Phillies.
- July 6, 1996: Mitch Williams was signed as a free agent by the Phillies.
- July 31, 1996: Terry Mulholland was traded by the Phillies to the Seattle Mariners for Desi Relaford.
- August 12, 1996: Rafael Quirico was released by the Phillies.
- September 30, 1996: Howard Battle was selected off waivers from the Phillies by the Los Angeles Dodgers.
- August 19, 1996: Mitch Williams was released by the Phillies.

=== All-Star Game ===
The 1996 Major League Baseball All-Star Game was the 67th playing of the midsummer classic between the all-stars of the American League (AL) and National League (NL). The game was held on July 9, 1996, at Veterans Stadium in Philadelphia. The game resulted in the National League defeating the American League 6–0. Joe Carter, the Toronto Blue Jays representative to the All-Star Game, received boos from the crowd for his home run that ended the 1993 World Series.

=== Roster ===
1996 Philadelphia Phillies
**Roster**
**Pitchers**: 55 Matt Beech; 21 Ron Blazier; 42 Toby Borland; 52 Ricky Bottalico; 54 Carlos Crawford; 34 Glenn Dishman; 50 Sid Fernandez; 37 Steve Frey; 44 Mike Grace; 43 Bronson Heflin; 39 Rich Hunter; 48 Ricardo Jordan; 43 Dave Leiper; 50 Calvin Maduro; 47 Mike Mimbs; 57 Larry Mitchell; 45 Terry Mulholland; 35 Bobby Muñoz; 49 Jeff Parrett; 43 Rafael Quirico; 51 Ken Ryan; 38 Curt Schilling; 33 Russ Springer; 40 David West; 41 Mike Williams	**Catchers**: 22 Gary Bennett; 27 Bobby Estalella; 24 Mike Lieberthal; 18 Benito Santiago; **Infielders**: 34 Howard Battle; 5 Mike Benjamin; 26 David Doster; 25 Gregg Jefferies; 23 Kevin Jordan; 12 Mickey Morandini; 13 Desi Relaford; 6 Scott Rolen; 6,5 Gene Schall; 31 Kevin Sefcik; 19 Kevin Stocker; 27 Todd Zeile; 43 Jon Zuber	**Outfielders**: 37 Rubén Amaro, Jr.; 10 Darren Daulton; 4 Lenny Dykstra; 8 Jim Eisenreich; 9 Pete Incaviglia; 29 Wendell Magee; 34 Manny Martínez; 7 Glenn Murray; 15 Ricky Otero; 17 J. R. Phillips; 26 Lee Tinsley; 22 Mark Whiten	**Manager**: 11 Jim Fregosi; **Coaches**: 2 Larry Bowa (Third Base); 30 Dave Cash (First Base); 14 Denis Menke (Hitting); 46 Johnny Podres (Pitching); 3 John Vukovich (Bench); 59 Joe Rigoli (Bullpen)

== Player stats ==
= Indicates team leader

=== Batting ===
==== Starters by position ====
Note: Pos = Position; G = Games played; AB = At bats; H = Hits; Avg. = Batting average; HR = Home runs; RBI = Runs batted in

Pos	Player	G	AB	H	Avg.	HR	RBI
C	Benito Santiago	136	481	127	.264	30	85
1B	Gregg Jeffries	104	404	118	.292	7	51
2B	Mickey Morandini	140	539	135	.250	3	32
SS	Kevin Stocker	119	394	100	.254	5	41
3B	Todd Zeile	134	500	134	.268	20	80
LF	Pete Incaviglia	99	269	63	.234	16	42
CF	Ricky Otero	104	411	112	.273	2	32
RF	Jim Eisenreich	113	338	122	.361	3	41

==== Other batters ====
Note: G = Games played; AB = At bats; H = Hits; Avg. = Batting average; HR = Home runs; RBI = Runs batted in

Player	G	AB	H	Avg.	HR	RBI
Mark Whiten	60	182	43	.236	7	21
Mike Lieberthal	50	166	42	.253	7	23
Wendell Magee	38	142	29	.204	2	14
Lenny Dykstra	40	134	35	.261	3	13
Kevin Jordan	43	131	37	.282	3	12
Scott Rolen	37	130	33	.254	4	18
Rubén Amaro Jr.	61	117	37	.316	2	15
Kevin Sefcik	44	116	33	.284	0	9
David Doster	39	105	28	.267	1	8
Mike Benjamin	35	103	23	.223	4	13
Glenn Murray	38	97	19	.196	2	6
Jon Zuber	30	91	23	.253	1	10
J.R. Phillips	35	79	12	.152	5	10
Gene Schall	28	66	18	.273	2	10
Lee Tinsley	31	52	7	.135	0	2
Desi Relaford	15	40	7	.175	0	1
Manny Martínez	13	36	8	.222	0	0
Bobby Estalella	7	17	6	.353	2	4
Gary Bennett	6	16	4	.250	0	1
Darren Daulton	5	12	2	.167	0	0
Howard Battle	5	5	0	.000	0	0

=== Pitching ===
==== Starting pitchers ====
Note: G = Games pitched; IP = Innings pitched; W = Wins; L = Losses; ERA = Earned run average; SO = Strikeouts

Player	G	IP	W	L	ERA	SO
Curt Schilling	26	183.1	9	10	3.19	182
Mike Williams	32	167.0	6	14	5.44	103
Terry Mulholland	21	133.1	8	7	4.66	52
Mike Mimbs	21	99.1	3	9	5.53	56
Mike Grace	12	80.0	7	2	3.49	49
Rich Hunter	14	69.1	3	7	6.49	32
Sid Fernandez	11	63.0	3	6	3.43	77
Matt Beech	8	41.1	1	4	6.97	33
David West	7	28.1	2	2	4.76	22
Bobby Muñoz	6	25.1	0	3	7.82	8
Carlos Crawford	1	3.2	0	1	4.91	4
Rafael Quirico	1	1.2	0	1	37.80	1

==== Other pitchers ====
Note: G = Games pitched; IP = Innings pitched; W = Wins; L = Losses; ERA = Earned run average; SO = Strikeouts

Player	G	IP	W	L	ERA	SO
Calvin Maduro	4	15.1	0	1	3.52	11
Glenn Dishman	4	7.0	0	0	7.71	3

==== Relief pitchers ====
Note: G = Games pitched; W = Wins; L = Losses; SV = Saves; ERA = Earned run average; SO = Strikeouts

Player	G	W	L	SV	ERA	SO
Ricky Bottalico	61	4	5	34	3.19	74
Toby Borland	69	7	3	0	4.07	76
Ken Ryan	62	3	5	8	2.43	70
Russ Springer	51	3	10	0	4.66	94
Steve Frey	31	0	1	0	4.72	12
Ron Blazier	27	3	1	0	5.87	25
Ricardo Jordan	26	2	2	0	1.80	17
Dave Leiper	26	2	0	0	6.43	10
Jeff Parrett	18	1	1	0	1.88	22
Larry Mitchell	7	0	0	0	4.50	7
Bronson Heflin	3	0	0	0	6.75	4

== Awards and honors ==
All-Star Game

- Ricky Bottalico, Pitcher, Reserve

== Farm system ==
Level	Team	League	Manager
AAA	Scranton/Wilkes-Barre; Red Barons	International League	Butch Hobson and Ramón Avilés
AA	Reading Phillies	Eastern League	Bill Robinson
A	Clearwater Phillies	Florida State League	Al LeBoeuf
A	Piedmont Boll Weevils	South Atlantic League	Roy Majtyka
A-Short Season	Batavia Clippers	New York–Penn League	Floyd Rayford
Rookie	Martinsville Phillies	Appalachian League	Ramon Henderson
