= List of Nippon Professional Baseball players (Z) =

The following is a list of Nippon Professional Baseball players with the last name starting with Z, retired or active.

== Z ==
Name	Debut	Final Game	Position	Teams	Ref
Da-Wei Zhu			Pitcher	Seibu Lions	
Jon Zuber	2001	2001	Infielder	Yokohama BayStars	
Julio Zuleta	June 23, 2003	2008	Infielder	Fukuoka Daiei Hawks, Fukuoka SoftBank Hawks, Chiba Lotte Marines	
