= 1996 Los Angeles Dodgers season =

1996 Los Angeles Dodgers
- National League Wild Card winners
- League: National League
- Division: West
- Ballpark: Dodger Stadium
- City: Los Angeles
- Record: 90–72 (.556)
- Divisional place: 2nd
- Owners: Peter O'Malley
- General managers: Fred Claire
- Managers: Tommy Lasorda, Bill Russell
- Television: KTLA (5)
- Radio: KABC (AM) (Vin Scully, Ross Porter, Rick Monday); KWKW (Jaime Jarrín, René Cárdenas)

The 1996 Los Angeles Dodgers season was the 107th for the franchise in Major League Baseball, and their 39th season in Los Angeles, California. The Dodgers were atop the standings for a substantial part of the season, albeit under two managers. Longtime manager Tommy Lasorda suffered a heart attack in late June and had to step down. Bill Russell, Lasorda's bench coach and a former Dodger player, was chosen to manage the rest of the season.

The Dodgers went into the final weekend of the season with a two-game lead on the San Diego Padres, needing only to win one of the final three games with the Padres to clinch the National League West title. However, the Padres swept them, and the Dodgers limped into the playoffs as a Wild Card team. The Dodgers were swept by the Atlanta Braves in the NLDS.

The Dodgers used 15 different pitchers during the season, the fewest of any MLB team in 1996.

== Offseason ==
- November 29, 1995: Acquired Mike Blowers from the Seattle Mariners for Miguel Cairo and Willie Otanez.
- December 15, 1995: Acquired Rick Clelland from the Montreal Expos for Omar Daal.
- December 17, 1995: Acquired Billy Brewer from the Kansas City Royals for José Offerman.

== Regular season ==
=== Season standings ===
NL West
Team	W	L	Pct.	GB	Home	Road
San Diego Padres	91	71	.562	—	45‍–‍36	46‍–‍35
Los Angeles Dodgers	90	72	.556	1	47‍–‍34	43‍–‍38
Colorado Rockies	83	79	.512	8	55‍–‍26	28‍–‍53
San Francisco Giants	68	94	.420	23	38‍–‍44	30‍–‍50

=== Record vs. opponents ===
1996 National League record Source: MLB Standings Grid – 1996
Team	ATL	CHC	CIN	COL	FLA	HOU	LAD	MON	NYM	PHI	PIT	SD	SF	STL
Atlanta	—	7–5	7–5	5–7	6–7	6–6	5–7	10–3	7–6	9–4	9–3	9–4	7–5	9–4
Chicago	5–7	—	5–8	5–7	6–6	5–8	8–5	6–6	7–5	7–6	4–9	6–6	7–5	5–8
Cincinnati	5–7	8–5	—	7–6	3–9	7–6	4–8	3–9	6–6	10–2	5–8	9–3	9–4	5–8
Colorado	7–5	7–5	6–7	—	5–8	8–5	6–7	3–9	7–5	6–6	7–5	8–5	5–8	8–4
Florida	7–6	6–6	9–3	8–5	—	7–5	6–7	5–8	7–6	6–7	5–7	3–9	5–7	6–6
Houston	6–6	8–5	6–7	5–8	5–7	—	6–6	4–9	8–4	10–2	8–5	6–6	8–4	2–11
Los Angeles	7–5	5–8	8–4	7–6	7–6	6–6	—	9–3	8–4	7–6	6–6	5–8	7–6	8–4
Montreal	3–10	6–6	9–3	9–3	8–5	9–4	3–9	—	7–6	6–7	7–5	4–8	9–4	8–4
New York	6–7	5–7	6–6	5–7	6–7	4–8	4–8	6–7	—	7–6	8–5	3–10	6–6	5–7
Philadelphia	4–9	6–7	2–10	6–6	7–6	2–10	6–7	7–6	6–7	—	7–5	4–8	6–6	4–8
Pittsburgh	3–9	9–4	8–5	5–7	7–5	5–8	6–6	5–7	5–8	5–7	—	4–9	8–4	3–10
San Diego	4–9	6–6	3–9	5–8	9–3	6–6	8–5	8–4	10–3	8–4	9–4	—	11–2	4–8
San Francisco	5–7	5–7	4–9	8–5	7–5	4–8	6–7	4–9	6–6	6–6	4–8	2–11	—	7–6
St. Louis	4–9	8–5	8–5	4–8	6–6	11–2	4–8	4–8	7–5	8–4	10–3	8–4	6–7	—

=== Opening Day lineup ===
Opening Day starters
Name	Position
Delino DeShields	Second baseman
Brett Butler	Center fielder
Mike Piazza	Catcher
Eric Karros	First baseman
Raúl Mondesí	Right fielder
Mike Blowers	Third baseman
Todd Hollandsworth	Left fielder
Greg Gagne	Shortstop
Ramón Martínez	Starting pitcher

=== Notable Transactions ===
- July 31, 1996: Acquired Chad Curtis from the Detroit Tigers for Joey Eischen and John Cummings
- August 31, 1996: Acquired Dave Clark from the Pittsburgh Pirates for Carl South
- October 30, 1996: Chip Hale signed as a free agent with the Los Angeles Dodgers.

== Roster ==
1996 Los Angeles Dodgers
**Roster**
**Pitchers**: 56 Pedro Astacio; 45 Jim Bruske; 49 Tom Candiotti; 41 John Cummings; 37 Darren Dreifort; 51 Joey Eischen; 44 Mark Guthrie; 52 Darren Hall; 48 Ramón Martínez; 16 Hideo Nomo; 13 Antonio Osuna; 61 Chan Ho Park; 36 Scott Radinsky; 59 Ismael Valdes; 38 Todd Worrell	**Catchers**: 26 Carlos Hernández; 31 Mike Piazza; 15 Tom Prince; **Infielders**: 20 Mike Blowers; 25 Mike Busch; 60 Juan Castro; 14 Delino DeShields; 3 Chad Fonville; 7 Greg Gagne; 5 Dave Hansen; 23 Eric Karros; 62 Oreste Marrero; 29 Tim Wallach	**Outfielders**: 21 Billy Ashley; 22 Brett Butler; 27 Roger Cedeño; 35 Dave Clark; 10 Chad Curtis; 28 Todd Hollandsworth; 55 Wayne Kirby; 43 Raúl Mondesí; 40 Rick Parker; 29 Milt Thompson; **Other batters**: 12 Karim García; 30 Wilton Guerrero	**Manager**: 2 Tommy Lasorda; 18 Bill Russell; **Coaches**: 8 Joey Amalfitano (third base); 58 Mark Cresse (bullpen); 11 Manny Mota; 18 Bill Russell (bench); 9 Reggie Smith (hitting/1st base); 17 Dave Wallace (pitching)

=== Game log ===
1996 Game Log: 90–72 (Home: 47–34; Away: 43–38)
April: 14–14 (Home: 10–4; Away: 4–10)

#	Date	Time (PT)	Opponent	Score	Win	Loss	Save	Time of Game	Attendance	Record	Box/ Streak
1	April 1		@ Astros	4–3	**Martinez** (1–0)	Reynolds	**Worrell** (1)		34,375	1–0	
2	April 2		@ Astros	4–5	Jones	**Cummings** (0–1)	—		20,492	1–1	
3	April 3		@ Astros	2–5	Hampton	**Nomo** (0–1)	Jones		14,858	1–2	
4	April 4		@ Cubs	4–9	Foster	**Astacio** (0–1)	—		12,626	1–3	
5	April 5		@ Cubs	1–11	Bullinger	**Candiotti** (0–1)	—		19,324	1–4	
6	April 6		@ Cubs	3–1	**Park** (1–0)	Navarro	**Worrell** (2)		24,428	2–4	
7	April 7		@ Cubs	4–5	Jones	**Osuna** (0–1)	—		19,002	2–5	
8	April 8	1:05 p.m. PDT	Braves	1–0	**Nomo** (1–1)	Glavine	—	2:24	53,180	3–5	W1
9	April 9	7:05 p.m. PDT	Braves	1–3	Smoltz	**Astacio** (0–2)	Wohlers	2:52	35,570	3–6	L1
10	April 10	7:35 p.m. PDT	Braves	9–2	**Candiotti** (1–1)	Avery	—	2:53	48,194	4–6	W1
11	April 11		Marlins	5–0	**Park** (2–0)	Brown	**Worrell** (3)		36,023	5–6	
12	April 12		Marlins	1–3	Burkett	**Valdez** (0–1)	—		40,343	5–7	
13	April 13		Marlins	3–1	**Nomo** (2–1)	Hammond	—		46,059	6–7	
14	April 14		Marlins	6–1	**Astacio** (1–2)	Leiter	—		49,728	7–7	
15	April 16		@ Giants	3–5	Dewey	**Osuna** (0–2)	Beck		19,716	7–8	
16	April 17		@ Giants	11–2	**Osuna** (1–2)	Leiter	—		17,039	8–8	
17	April 19		@ Marlins	0–5	Powell	**Hall** (0–1)	—		24,143	8–9	
18	April 20		@ Marlins	4–7	Leiter	**Nomo** (2–2)	Nen		35,542	8–10	
19	April 21		@ Marlins	4–5	Brown	**Hall** (0–2)	Mathews		23,842	8–11	
20	April 22	4:40 p.m. PDT	@ Braves	1–4	Maddux	**Candiotti** (1–2)	—	2:03	33,080	8–12	L4
21	April 23	5:40 p.m. PDT	@ Braves	3–2	**Osuna** (2–2)	Clontz	**Worrell** (4)	2:55	30,475	9–12	W1
22	April 24		Astros	5–2	**Valdez** (1–1)	Brocail	—		26,666	10–12	
23	April 25		Astros	6–4	**Nomo** (3–2)	Drabek	**Worrell** (5)		33,530	11–12	
24	April 26		Cubs	1–0	**Astacio** (2–2)	Trachsel	**Worrell** (6)		31,172	12–12	
25	April 27		Cubs	3–4 (10)	Navarro	**Osuna** (2–3)	Jones		43,519	12–13	
26	April 28		Cubs	0–3	Castillo	**Park** (2–1)	—		45,441	12–14	
27	April 29		Cubs	10–4	**Valdez** (2–1)	Foster	—		39,003	13–14	
28	April 30		Rockies	7–4	**Nomo** (4–2)	Ritz	**Worrell** (7)		31,037	14–14	

May: 15–12 (Home: 6–5; Away: 9–7)

#	Date	Time (PT)	Opponent	Score	Win	Loss	Save	Time of Game	Attendance	Record	Box/ Streak
29	May 1		Rockies	1–4	Thompson	**Astacio** (2–3)	Ruffin		30,377	14–15	
30	May 3		@ Pirates	10–1	**Park** (3–1)	Darwin	—		18,268	15–15	
31	May 4		@ Pirates	2–7	Wagner	**Candiotti** (1–3)	—		20,321	15–16	
32	May 5		@ Pirates	2–4	Neagle	**Valdez** (2–2)	Plesac		19,206	15–17	
33	May 6		@ Pirates	8–4	**Nomo** (5–2)	Hope	**Radinsky** (1)		9,415	16–17	
34	May 7		@ Reds	2–3 (12)	Moore	**Worrell** (0–1)	—		18,147	16–18	
35	May 8		@ Reds	0–5	Schourek	**Park** (3–2)	Shaw		17,820	16–19	
36	May 10		@ Cardinals	3–2 (12)	**Worrell** (1–1)	Eckersley	—		36,821	17–19	
37	May 11		@ Cardinals	4–2	**Valdez** (3–2)	Benes	**Worrell** (8)		38,008	18–19	
38	May 12		@ Cardinals	5–6	Petkovsek	**Nomo** (5–3)	Eckersley		38,549	18–20	
39	May 13		Expos	2–3	Manuel	**Worrell** (1–2)	Rojas		25,600	18–21	
40	May 14		Expos	2–1	**Martinez** (2–0)	Veres	**Worrell** (9)		37,942	19–21	
41	May 15		Expos	7–2	**Candiotti** (2–3)	Fassero	—		26,875	20–21	
42	May 16		Phillies	8–2	**Valdez** (4–2)	Mimbs	—		25,960	21–21	
43	May 17		Phillies	6–3	**Nomo** (6–3)	Grace	**Worrell** (10)		54,304	22–21	
44	May 18		Phillies	7–2	**Astacio** (3–3)	Fernandez	**Osuna** (1)		51,064	23–21	
45	May 19		Phillies	4–5	Leiper	**Radinsky** (0–1)	Bottalico		38,178	23–22	
46	May 20		Mets	1–7	Jones	**Candiotti** (2–4)	—		26,625	23–23	
47	May 21		Mets	6–4	**Valdez** (5–2)	Harnisch	**Worrell** (11)		27,158	24–23	
48	May 22		Mets	2–3	Clark	**Nomo** (6–4)	Franco		33,716	24–24	
49	May 24		@ Expos	5–4 (11)	**Osuna** (3–3)	Daal	**Worrell** (12)		27,843	25–24	
50	May 25		@ Expos	5–3	**Martinez** (3–0)	Cormier	**Worrell** (13)		27,104	26–24	
51	May 26		@ Expos	4–3	**Candiotti** (3–4)	Rojas	**Worrell** (14)		30,718	27–24	
52	May 28		@ Phillies	3–9	Grace	**Valdez** (5–3)	—		17,186	27–25	
53	May 29		@ Phillies	3–2 (11)	**Guthrie** (1–0)	Bottalico	**Worrell** (15)		24,120	28–25	
54	May 30		@ Phillies	2–3	Borland	**Worrell** (1–3)	—		29,287	28–26	
55	May 31		@ Mets	10–3	**Martinez** (4–0)	Jones	—		19,793	29–26	

June: 13–14 (Home: 6–8; Away: 7–6)

#	Date	Time (PT)	Opponent	Score	Win	Loss	Save	Time of Game	Attendance	Record	Box/ Streak
56	June 1		@ Mets	3–4	Harnisch	**Candiotti** (3–5)	Franco		26,445	29–27	
57	June 2		@ Mets	1–0	**Valdez** (6–3)	Clark	**Worrell** (16)		39,328	30–27	
58	June 4		Pirates	0–3	Darwin	**Nomo** (6–5)	Cordova		29,576	30–28	
59	June 5		Pirates	3–7	Wilkins	**Astacio** (3–4)	Cordova		32,161	30–29	
60	June 6		Pirates	8–3	**Candiotti** (4–5)	Miceli	—		26,664	31–29	
61	June 7		Reds	1–2	Smiley	**Valdez** (6–4)	Brantley		35,197	31–30	
62	June 8		Reds	5–4 (10)	**Worrell** (2–3)	Carrasco	—		44,575	32–30	
63	June 9		Reds	3–2	**Nomo** (7–5)	Smith	**Worrell** (17)		47,847	33–30	
64	June 10		Cardinals	2–1	**Park** (4–2)	Morgan	**Osuna** (2)		54,043	34–30	
65	June 11		Cardinals	3–6	Osborne	**Martinez** (4–1)	Honeycutt		29,096	34–31	
66	June 13	4:42 p.m. PDT	@ Braves	6–3	**Valdez** (7–4)	Glavine	**Worrell** (18)	2:43	39,463	35–31	W1
67	June 14	4:40 p.m. PDT	@ Braves	1–3	Smoltz	**Astacio** (3–5)	Wohlers	2:12	45,389	35–32	L1
68	June 15	3:14 p.m. PDT	@ Braves	6–2	**Nomo** (8–5)	Avery	**Worrell** (19)	2:43	49,726	36–32	W1
69	June 16	10:11 a.m. PDT	@ Braves	3–2	**Candiotti** (5–5)	Schmidt	**Worrell** (20)	2:36	44,784	37–32	W2
70	June 18		@ Cubs	9–6	**Martinez** (5–1)	Telemaco	**Worrell** (21)		—	38–32	
71	June 18		@ Cubs	4–7	Campbell	**Valdez** (7–5)	—		23,362	38–33	
72	June 19		@ Cubs	4–3 (13)	**Park** (5–2)	Adams	**Worrell** (22)		28,477	39–33	
73	June 20		Astros	2–4	Wall	**Nomo** (8–6)	Jones		49,656	39–34	
74	June 21		Astros	3–11	Drabek	**Candiotti** (5–6)	—		33,273	39–35	
75	June 22		Astros	3–0	**Martinez** (6–1)	Reynolds	—		37,844	40–35	
76	June 23		Astros	4–3	**Worrell** (3–3)	Hernandez	—		35,467	41–35	
77	June 25		Cubs	0–2	Trachsel	**Nomo** (8–7)	—		37,448	41–36	
78	June 26		Cubs	4–6	Navarro	**Candiotti** (5–7)	Adams		35,200	41–37	
79	June 27		@ Rockies	1–13	Ritz	**Astacio** (3–6)	—		48,043	41–38	
80	June 28		@ Rockies	4–13	Freeman	**Martinez** (6–2)	—		48,025	41–39	
81	June 29		@ Rockies	13–10	**Valdez** (8–5)	Rekar	—		48,009	42–39	
82	June 30		@ Rockies	15–16	Ruffin	**Worrell** (3–4)	—		48,103	42–40	

July: 15–11 (Home: 8–5; Away: 7–6)

#	Date	Time (PT)	Opponent	Score	Win	Loss	Save	Time of Game	Attendance	Record	Box/ Streak
83	July 1		@ Padres	10–2	**Candiotti** (6–7)	Worrell	—		40,343	43–40	
84	July 2		@ Padres	7–3	**Astacio** (4–6)	Valenzuela	—		28,294	44–40	
85	July 3		@ Padres	2–3	Hamilton	**Martinez** (6–3)	Hoffman		48,841	44–41	
86	July 4		Rockies	9–4	**Valdez** (9–5)	Freeman	—		54,331	45–41	
87	July 5		Rockies	8–1	**Nomo** (9–7)	Bailey	—		43,415	46–41	
88	July 6		Rockies	3–2	**Osuna** (4–3)	Ruffin	**Worrell** (23)		35,562	47–41	
89	July 7		Rockies	0–3	Ritz	**Astacio** (4–7)	—		38,269	47–42	
90	July 11		Giants	8–3	**Martinez** (7–3)	Leiter	—		37,305	48–42	
91	July 12		Giants	6–1	**Valdez** (10–5)	Fernandez	—		44,569	49–42	
92	July 13		Giants	0–7	Estes	**Nomo** (9–8)	—		54,226	49–43	
93	July 14		Giants	0–6	VanLandingham	**Park** (5–3)	—		42,862	49–44	
94	July 15		Padres	1–0 (10)	**Guthrie** (2–0)	Hoffman	—		44,368	50–44	
95	July 16		Padres	1–10	Tewksbury	**Martinez** (7–4)	Worrell		52,436	50–45	
96	July 17		Padres	4–5	Florie	**Osuna** (4–4)	Hoffman		42,423	50–46	
97	July 18		@ Giants	8–3	**Nomo** (10–8)	Estes	—		28,072	51–46	
98	July 19		@ Giants	4–5	VanLandingham	**Candiotti** (6–8)	Beck		27,562	51–47	
99	July 20		@ Giants	6–7	Bautista	**Worrell** (3–5)	—		50,014	51–48	
100	July 21		@ Giants	7–6	**Osuna** (5–4)	DeLucia	**Worrell** (25)		36,345	52–48	
101	July 23		@ Marlins	7–1	**Valdez** (11–5)	Leiter	—		17,889	53–48	
102	July 24		@ Marlins	0–3	Brown	**Nomo** (10–9)	Nen		20,486	53–49	
103	July 25		@ Marlins	6–3	**Astacio** (5–7)	Hammond	**Worrell** (26)		18,151	54–49	
104	July 26		@ Astros	3–4	Darwin	**Guthrie** (2–1)	Wagner		27,089	54–50	
105	July 27		@ Astros	6–5 (11)	**Osuna** (6–4)	Clark	**Worrell** (27)		36,841	55–50	
106	July 28		@ Astros	2–3	Darwin	**Eischen** (0–1)	—		32,912	55–51	
107	July 30		Marlins	5–4 (10)	**Osuna** (7–4)	Weathers	—		34,973	56–51	
108	July 31		Marlins	3–0	**Martinez** (8–4)	Rapp	**Worrell** (28)		29,565	57–51	

August: 17–10 (Home: 7–6; Away: 10–4)

#	Date	Time (PT)	Opponent	Score	Win	Loss	Save	Time of Game	Attendance	Record	Box/ Streak
109	August 1		Marlins	6–7 (14)	Hammond	**Dreifort** (0–1)	Mathews		41,197	57–52	
110	August 2	7:08 p.m. PDT	Braves	2–1	**Radinsky** (1–1)	Smoltz	**Guthrie** (1)	2:52	49,012	58–52	W1
111	August 3	1:05 p.m. PDT	Braves	3–5 (18)	Woodall	**Martinez** (8–5)	—	5:05	42,575	58–53	L1
112	August 4	1:06 p.m. PDT	Braves	4–6	Borbon	**Guthrie** (2–2)	Wohlers	3:17	45,903	58–54	L2
113	August 6		@ Pirates	3–1	**Astacio** (6–7)	Parris	**Worrell** (29)		11,824	59–54	
114	August 7		@ Pirates	2–12	Lieber	**Martinez** (8–6)	Wilkins		12,232	59–55	
115	August 9		@ Reds	4–9	Portugal	**Valdez** (11–6)	—		34,004	59–56	
116	August 10		@ Reds	7–5	**Nomo** (11–9)	Burba	**Worrell** (30)		33,830	60–56	
117	August 11		@ Reds	10–5	**Osuna** (8–4)	Carrasco	—		27,897	61–56	
118	August 12		@ Reds	6–5	**Martinez** (9–6)	Smiley	**Worrell** (31)		21,677	62–56	
119	August 13		@ Cardinals	8–4	**Candiotti** (7–8)	Stottlemyre	—		30,761	63–56	
120	August 14		@ Cardinals	1–6	Benes	**Valdez** (11–7)	—		26,945	63–57	
121	August 15		@ Cardinals	5–2	**Nomo** (12–9)	Morgan	**Worrell** (32)		32,930	64–57	
122	August 16		Expos	8–2	**Astacio** (7–7)	Urbina	—		51,573	65–57	
123	August 17		Expos	7–6	**Worrell** (4–5)	Veres	—		47,549	66–57	
124	August 18		Expos	3–7	Leiter	**Candiotti** (7–9)	—		36,673	66–58	
125	August 20		Phillies	1–3	Jordan	**Osuna** (8–5)	Bottalico		35,457	66–59	
126	August 21		Phillies	0–6	Schilling	**Nomo** (12–10)	—		39,502	66–60	
127	August 22		Phillies	8–5	**Astacio** (8–7)	Williams	**Worrell** (33)		29,608	67–60	
128	August 23		Mets	7–5	**Martinez** (10–6)	Clark	**Worrell** (34)		36,909	68–60	
129	August 24		Mets	7–5	**Candiotti** (8–9)	Wilson	**Worrell** (35)		33,201	69–60	
130	August 25		Mets	6–5	**Radinsky** (2–1)	Franco	**Worrell** (36)		39,056	70–60	
131	August 27		@ Expos	5–1	**Nomo** (13–10)	Fassero	—		21,040	71–60	
132	August 28		@ Expos	5–6	Rojas	**Park** (5–4)	—		13,006	71–61	
133	August 29		@ Expos	2–1	**Martinez** (11–6)	Martinez	**Worrell** (37)		16,551	72–61	
134	August 30		@ Phillies	7–6 (12)	**Dreifort** (1–1)	Parrett	**Worrell** (38)		22,129	73–61	
135	August 31		@ Phillies	11–7	**Valdez** (12–7)	Schilling	**Osuna** (3)		24,821	74–61	

September: 16–11 (Home: 10–6; Away: 6–5)

#	Date	Time (PT)	Opponent	Score	Win	Loss	Save	Time of Game	Attendance	Record	Box/ Streak
136	September 1		@ Phillies	3–6	Williams	**Worrell** (4–6)	Bottalico		24,959	74–62	
137	September 2		@ Mets	8–5	**Astacio** (9–7)	Clark	**Worrell** (39)		19,658	75–62	
138	September 3		@ Mets	7–6	**Radinsky** (3–1)	Henry	—		15,646	76–62	
139	September 4		@ Mets	2–3 (12)	Wallace	**Dreifort** (1–2)	—		15,662	76–63	
140	September 6		Pirates	2–1	**Osuna** (9–5)	Wilkins	**Worrell** (40)		41,509	77–63	
141	September 7		Pirates	4–3	**Nomo** (14–10)	Schmidt	**Worrell** (41)		50,862	78–63	
142	September 8		Pirates	1–4	Plesac	**Dreifort** (1–3)	Ericks		33,922	78–64	
143	September 9		Reds	7–2	**Martinez** (12–6)	Jarvis	—		29,081	79–64	
144	September 10		Reds	5–4	**Candiotti** (9–9)	Salkeld	**Worrell** (42)		28,237	80–64	
145	September 11		Reds	3–2	**Valdez** (13–7)	Smiley	**Worrell** (43)		27,527	81–64	
146	September 12		Cardinals	4–1	**Nomo** (15–10)	Osborne	**Osuna** (4)		34,191	82–64	
147	September 13		Cardinals	0–2	Batchelor	**Guthrie** (2–3)	Eckersley		36,657	82–65	
148	September 14		Cardinals	9–5	**Martinez** (13–6)	Benes	—		44,548	83–65	
149	September 15		Cardinals	6–5	**Radinsky** (4–1)	Eckersley	**Worrell** (44)		35,803	84–65	
150	September 16		@ Rockies	6–4	**Valdez** (14–7)	Wright	—		48,013	85–65	
151	September 17		@ Rockies	9–0	**Nomo** (16–10)	Swift	—		50,066	86–65	
152	September 18		@ Rockies	4–6	Burke	**Astacio** (9–8)	Ruffin		50,053	86–66	
153	September 19		@ Padres	7–0	**Martinez** (14–6)	Valenzuela	—		41,287	87–66	
154	September 20		@ Padres	2–4	Hamilton	**Candiotti** (9–10)	Hoffman		51,217	87–67	
155	September 21		@ Padres	9–2	**Valdez** (15–7)	Sanders	—		53,629	88–67	
156	September 22		@ Padres	2–3	Ashby	**Nomo** (16–11)	Hoffman		51,092	88–68	
157	September 24		Giants	6–2	**Martinez** (15–6)	Watson	—		37,448	89–68	
158	September 25		Giants	7–5	**Radinsky** (5–1)	DeLucia	**Worrell** (45)		42,405	90–68	
159	September 26		Giants	1–6	Gardner	**Candiotti** (9–11)	—		38,893	90–69	
160	September 27		Padres	2–5 (10)	Worrell	**Osuna** (9–6)	Hoffman		53,294	90–70	
161	September 28		Padres	2–4	Worrell	**Dreifort** (1–4)	Hoffman		52,977	90–71	
162	September 29		Padres	0–2 (11)	Veras	**Park** (5–5)	Hoffman		53,270	90–72	

Legend: = Win = Loss
Bold = Dodgers team member

=== Detailed records ===
National League
Opponent	W	L	WP	RS	RA
NL East
Atlanta Braves	7	5	0.583	40	33
Florida Marlins	7	6	0.538	50	40
Montreal Expos	9	3	0.750	55	39
New York Mets	8	4	0.667	60	50
Philadelphia Phillies	7	6	0.538	63	59
Total	38	24	0.613	268	221
NL Central
Chicago Cubs	5	8	0.385	47	61
Cincinnati Reds	8	4	0.667	53	48
Houston Astros	6	6	0.500	44	49
Pittsburgh Pirates	6	6	0.500	45	50
St. Louis Cardinals	8	4	0.667	50	42
Total	33	28	0.541	239	250
NL West
Colorado Rockies	7	6	0.538	80	80
**Los Angeles Dodgers**					
San Diego Padres	5	8	0.385	49	43
San Francisco Giants	7	6	0.538	67	58
Total	19	20	0.487	196	181
Season Total	90	72	0.556	703	652

Month	Games	Won	Lost	Win %	RS	RA
April	28	14	14	0.500	106	100
May	27	15	12	0.556	114	97
June	27	13	14	0.481	111	136
July	26	15	11	0.577	116	94
August	27	17	10	0.630	138	133
September	27	16	11	0.593	118	92
Total	162	90	72	0.556	703	652

	Games	Won	Lost	Win %	RS	RA
Home	81	47	34	0.580	314	283
Away	81	43	38	0.531	389	369
Total	162	90	72	0.556	703	652

=== Postseason Game log ===
Legend
	Dodgers win
	Dodgers loss
**Bold**	Dodgers team member

1996 Postseason game log: 0–3 (Home: 0–2; Away: 0–1)
NL Division Series: vs. Atlanta Braves 0–3 (Home: 0–2; Away: 0–1)

#	Date	Time (PT)	Opponent	Score	Win	Loss	Save	Time of Game	Attendance	Series	Box/ Streak
1	October 2	1:07 p.m. PDT	Braves	L 1–2 (10)	Smoltz (1–0)	**Osuna** (0–1)	Wohlers (1)	3:08	47,428	ATL 1–0	L1
2	October 3	5:07 p.m. PDT	Braves	L 2–3	Maddux (1–0)	**Valdez** (0–1)	Wohlers (2)	2:08	51,916	ATL 2–0	L2
3	October 5	1:16 p.m. PDT	@ Braves	L 2–5	Glavine (1–0)	**Nomo** (0–1)	Wohlers (3)	3:19	52,529	ATL 3–0	L3

== Starting Pitchers stats ==
Note: G = Games pitched; GS = Games started; IP = Innings pitched; W/L = Wins/Losses; ERA = Earned run average; BB = Walks allowed; SO = Strikeouts; CG = Complete games

Name	G	GS	IP	W/L	ERA	BB	SO	CG
Hideo Nomo	33	33	228.3	16-11	3.19	85	234	3
Ismael Valdez	33	33	225.0	15-7	3.32	54	173	0
Pedro Astacio	35	32	211.7	9-8	3.44	67	130	0
Ramón Martínez	28	27	168.7	15-6	3.42	86	133	2
Tom Candiotti	28	27	152.3	9-11	4.49	43	79	1

== Relief Pitchers stats ==
Note: G = Games pitched; GS = Games started; IP = Innings pitched; W/L = Wins/Losses; ERA = Earned run average; BB = Walks allowed; SO = Strikeouts; SV = Saves

Name	G	GS	IP	W/L	ERA	BB	SO	SV
Todd Worrell	72	0	65.3	4-6	3.03	15	66	44
Antonio Osuna	73	0	84.0	9-6	3.00	32	85	4
Mark Guthrie	66	0	73.0	2-3	2.22	22	56	1
Scott Radinsky	58	0	52.3	5-1	2.41	17	48	1
Chan Ho Park	48	10	108.7	5-5	3.64	71	119	0
Joey Eischen	28	0	43.3	0-1	4.78	20	36	0
Darren Dreifort	19	0	23.7	1-4	4.94	12	24	0
Jim Bruske	11	0	12.7	0-0	5.68	3	12	0
Darren Hall	9	0	12.0	0-2	6.00	5	12	0
John Cummings	4	0	5.3	0-1	6.75	2	5	0

== Batting Stats ==
Note: Pos = Position; G = Games played; AB = At bats; Avg. = Batting average; R = Runs scored; H = Hits; HR = Home runs; RBI = Runs batted in; SB = Stolen bases

Name	Pos	G	AB	Avg.	R	H	HR	RBI	SB
Mike Piazza	C	148	547	.336	87	184	36	105	0
Tom Prince	C	40	64	.297	6	19	1	11	0
Carlos Hernández	C	13	14	.286	1	4	0	0	0
Eric Karros	1B	154	608	.260	84	158	34	111	8
Delino DeShields	2B	154	581	.224	75	130	5	41	48
Greg Gagne	SS	128	428	.255	48	109	10	55	4
Mike Blowers	3B/1B/SS	92	317	.265	31	84	6	38	0
Chad Fonville	2B/SS/LF/CF/3B	103	201	.204	34	41	0	13	7
Tim Wallach	3B	45	162	.228	14	37	4	22	0
Juan Castro	SS/3B/2B/LF	70	132	.197	16	26	0	5	1
Dave Hansen	3B/1B	80	104	.221	7	23	0	6	0
Mike Busch	3B/1B	38	83	.217	8	18	4	17	0
Oreste Marrero	1B	10	8	.375	2	3	0	1	0
Wilton Guerrero	IF	5	2	.000	1	0	0	0	0
Raúl Mondesí	RF	157	634	.297	98	188	24	88	14
Roger Cedeño	CF/LF/RF	86	211	.246	26	52	2	18	5
Todd Hollandsworth	LF/CF/RF	149	478	.291	64	139	12	59	21
Wayne Kirby	CF/LF	65	188	.271	23	51	1	11	4
Brett Butler	CF	34	131	.267	22	35	0	8	8
Billy Ashley	LF	71	110	.200	18	22	9	25	0
Chad Curtis	CF	43	104	.212	20	22	2	9	2
Milt Thompson	LF	48	51	.118	2	6	0	1	1
Dave Clark	LF	15	15	.200	0	3	0	1	0
Rick Parker	CF/LF	16	14	.286	2	4	0	1	1
Karim García	OF	1	1	.000	0	0	0	0	0

== 1996 Playoffs ==
=== 1996 National League Division Series ===
The 1996 National League Division Series was played between Los Angeles Dodgers and Atlanta Braves. Atlanta ended up winning the series 3-0.

==== Game 1, October 2 ====
Dodger Stadium, Los Angeles

Team	1	2	3	4	5	6	7	8	9	10	R	H	E
Atlanta	0	0	0	1	0	0	0	0	0	1	2	4	0
Los Angeles	0	0	0	0	1	0	0	0	0	0	1	5	0
W: John Smoltz (1-0) L: Antonio Osuna (0-1) SV: Mark Wohlers (1)
HRs: ATL – Javy López (1); LAD – none

==== Game 2, October 3 ====
Dodger Stadium, Los Angeles

Team	1	2	3	4	5	6	7	8	9	R	H	E
Atlanta	0	1	0	0	0	0	2	0	0	3	5	2
Los Angeles	1	0	0	1	0	0	0	0	0	2	3	0
W: Greg Maddux (1-0) L: Ismael Valdez (0-1) SV: Mark Wohlers (2)
HRs: ATL – Fred McGriff (1), Ryan Klesko (1), Jermaine Dye (1); LAD – none

==== Game 3, October 5 ====
Atlanta–Fulton County Stadium, Atlanta

Team	1	2	3	4	5	6	7	8	9	R	H	E
Los Angeles	0	0	0	0	0	0	1	1	0	2	6	1
Atlanta	1	0	0	4	0	0	0	0	X	5	7	0
W: Tom Glavine (1-0) L: Hideo Nomo (0-1) SV: Mark Wohlers (3)
HRs: LA – none; ATL – Chipper Jones (1)

== 1996 Awards ==
- 1996 Major League Baseball All-Star Game
  - Mike Piazza starter
  - Todd Worrell reserve
- Rookie of the Year Award
  - Todd Hollandsworth
- All-Star Game MVP Award
  - Mike Piazza
- TSN National League All-Star
  - Mike Piazza
- Players Choice: Outstanding NL Rookie
  - Todd Hollandsworth
- Baseball Digest Rookie All-Star
  - Todd Hollandsworth
- Silver Slugger Award
  - Mike Piazza
- NL Pitcher of the Month
  - Hideo Nomo (September 1996)
- NL Player of the Week
  - Hideo Nomo (Sep. 16–22)
- Branch Rickey Award
  - Brett Butler

== Farm system ==
Level	Team	League	Manager
AAA	Albuquerque Dukes	Pacific Coast League	Phil Regan
AA	San Antonio Missions	Texas League	John Shelby
High A	San Bernardino Stampede	California League	Del Crandall
High A	Vero Beach Dodgers	Florida State League	Jon Debus
**A**	**Savannah Sand Gnats**	**South Atlantic League**	**John Shoemaker**
**A-Short Season**	**Yakima Bears**	**Northwest League**	**Joe Vavra**
Rookie	Great Falls Dodgers	Pioneer League	Mickey Hatcher
Rookie	DSL Dodgers; DSL Dodgers 2	Dominican Summer League	

Teams in BOLD won League Championships

== Major League Baseball draft ==
The Dodgers selected 79 players in this draft. Of those, seven of them would eventually play Major League baseball.

The top draft pick was third baseman Damian Rolls from Schlagel High School. He was selected by the Kansas City Royals in the 1999 Rule 5 draft and then traded to the Tampa Bay Devil Rays, where he played parts of five seasons with a .248 batting average, 9 homers and 73 RBI.

Shortstop Alex Cora was drafted in the third round out of the University of Miami. He would play 14 seasons in the Majors (7 of them with the Dodgers), primarily as a utility infielder/defensive replacement. He hit .243 in 1,273 games and later became a manager with the Boston Red Sox.

The most successful player in this draft class was left-handed pitcher Ted Lilly from Fresno City College, who was drafted in the 23rd round. A two-time All-Star, he would play 15 seasons in the Majors (the last 4 with the Dodgers) and had a 130-113 record and 4.14 ERA in 356 games (331 starts).

1996 draft picks

Round	Name	Position	School	Signed	Career span	Highest level
1	Damian Rolls	3B	Schlagel High School	Yes	1996–2009	**MLB**
2	Josh Glassey	C	Mission Bay High School	Yes	1996–2002	AAA
3	Alex Cora	SS	University of Miami	Yes	1996–2011	**MLB**
4	Peter Bergeron	OF	Greenfield High School	Yes	1996–2007	**MLB**
5	Nick Leach	1B	Madera High School	Yes	1996–2002	AA
6	Jack Jones	SS	California State University, Fullerton	Yes	1996–2004	AAA
7	Ben Simon	RHP	Eastern Michigan University	Yes	1996–2005	AAA
8	Chris Karabinus	LHP	Towson University	Yes	1997	A-
9	Edwin Falcon	C	Tomas C Ongay High School	Yes	1996–1998	A-
10	Jeff Auterson	OF	Norte Vista High School	Yes	1996–2001	A+
11	Jason Walters	RHP	Meridian Community College	Yes	1997–1999	A-
12	Randy Stearns	OF	University of Wisconsin–River Falls	Yes	1996–1997	A
13	Derrick Peoples	OF	Billy Ryan High School	Yes	1997–2004	A-
14	Willie King	1B	Franklin D. Roosevelt High School	Yes	1996–2005	A
15	Casey Snow	C	California State University, Long Beach	Yes	1996–2000	AAA
16	Matthew Kramer	RHP	Moorpark College	Yes	1996–1999	A+
17	Mikal Richey	OF	Columbia High School	Yes	1996–1997	Rookie
18	Pedro Flores	LHP	East Los Angeles College	Yes	1996–2011	AAA
19	Mickey Maestas	RHP	George Mason University	Yes	1996–1997	A-
20	Ismael Gallo	SS	Mt. San Antonio College	Yes	1997–2001	A+
21	Kimani Newton	OF	St. Joseph High School	Yes	1996–2000	A+
22	Elvis Correa	RHP	South Division High School	Yes	1996–2001	A+
23	Ted Lilly	LHP	Fresno City College	Yes	1996–2013	**MLB**
24	Pat Kelleher	OF		Yes	1997–2002	A+
25	Scott Morrison	SS	Baylor University	Yes	1996–1997	A
26	Monte Marshall	2B	Birmingham–Southern College	Yes	1996–1997	A+
27	Steve Wilson	C	Georgia Southern University	Yes	1996–1998	A+
28	Brian Zaun	OF	Butler University	Yes	1996–1997	A
29	Toby Dollar	RHP	Texas Christian University	Yes	1996–1999	AAA
30	Rich Saitta	2B	Rutgers, the State University of New Jersey	Yes	1996–2002	AAA
31	Brian Foulks	OF	Benedict College	Yes	1996–1997	A
32	Brian Sankey	1B	Boston College	Yes	1996–1998	A+
33	Brian Jacobson	LHP	California Baptist University	Yes	1996–1997	A
34	Brad Creese	C	Marina High School	No; Diamondbacks-2000	2000–2006	AAA
35	Don Thomas	LHP	Andrew College	No; Astros-1997	1997–2003	A
36	Wayne Franklin	LHP	University of Maryland, Baltimore County	Yes	1996–2010	**MLB**
37	Jim Fritz	C	University of Tennessee	No; Phillies-1997	1997–1998	A
38	Jeff Kubenka	LHP	St. Mary's University	Yes	1996–2002	**MLB**
39	Bryan Cranson	LHP	Bronson High School	No		
40	Frank Thompson	RHP	Embry–Riddle Aeronautical University	Yes	1996–2001	A+
41	Jason Weekley	OF	Saint Mary's College of California	Yes	1996–1997	A+
42	Jake Allen	C	Southeastern Illinois College	Yes	1997	Rookie
43	Kevin Culmo	RHP	California State University, Sacramento	Yes	1996	A-
44	Eddie Sordo	RHP	Jacksonville University	No		
45	Erik Lazerus	SS	California State University, Chico	No	1997–1999	Ind
46	Bradley Turner	C	Belton High School	No		
47	Eric Lovinger	RHP	Oregon State University	Yes	1996	A-
48	Neal Hannah	RHP	Mercer University	Yes	1996–1998	A-
49	Peter Brinjak	RHP	Power-St. Joseph's High School	No		
50	Brian Paulk	RHP	Saginaw Valley State University	Yes	1996–1998	A+
51	Doug Straight	RHP	Buckhannon-Upshur High School	No		
52	Dean Mitchell	RHP	Texas A&M University	Yes	1996–2001	AAA
53	Blake Mayo	RHP	University of Alabama at Birmingham	Yes	1996–2002	AAA
54	James Jackson	OF	Kankakee High School	No		
55	Adam Flohr	LHP	Spokane Falls Community College	No; Devil Rays-1998	1998–2003	AAA
56	Spencer Micunek	RHP	Kalamazoo Valley Community College	No		
57	Ryan Anholt	2B	Kwantlen College	No	2000	Ind
58	Brian Little	3B	College of the Sequoias	No		
59	J. C. Huguest	C	Coral Park High School	No; Reds-2000	2000–2008	A+
60	Craig Jarvis	OF	Claremont Secondary School	No		
61	Kevin Sullivan	C	Pacelli High School	No; Phillies-2000	2000–2008	AAA
62	Mark Paschal	OF	Chaffey College	No		
63	George Bailey	3B	St. Joseph High School	No		
64	Joseph Thomas	RHP	Mt. San Antonio College	No		
65	Devin Helps	LHP	McClung Collegiate High School	No		
66	Travis Bolton	C	West Valley High School	No		
67	Graig Merritt	C	Terry Fox Secondary School	No; Devil Rays-2001	2001–2005	AA
68	Samuel Shelton	RHP	Durango High School	No		
69	Mike Meyer	SS	Sabino High School	No; Cardinals-2000	2000–2014	A+
70	Matt Mason	C	J. Lloyd Crow High School	No	2000–2003	Ind
71	Kevin Huff	RHP	Horizon High School	No		
72	Eric Bruntlett	SS	Harrison High School	No; Astros-2000	2000–2010	**MLB**
73	Edwin Rodriguez	1B	Academia Cristo Rey	No		
74	Ryan Withey	SS	Mainland High School	No; Angels-2000	2000–2001	A
75	Paul Sirant	RHP	River East Collegiate High School	No		
76	Chad Zaniewski	OF	John I. Leonard High School	No		
77	Richard Garner	C	Wade Hampton High School	No		
78	Jim Davis	1B	Berrien County High School	No		
79	Saúl Rivera	SS	Lake Land College	No		
