= Zhu Dawei =

Zhu Dawei may refer to:

- Zhu Dawei (baseball), pitcher for the Seibu Lions
- Zhu Dawei (historian), a historian of the Six Dynasties era
