= 1996 Cincinnati Reds season =

1996 Cincinnati Reds
- League: National League
- Division: Central
- Ballpark: Cinergy Field
- City: Cincinnati
- Record: 81–81 (.500)
- Divisional place: 3rd
- Owners: Marge Schott
- General managers: Jim Bowden
- Managers: Ray Knight
- Television: WSTR; SportsChannel Cincinnati (Marty Brennaman, George Grande, Chris Welsh)
- Radio: WLW (Marty Brennaman, Joe Nuxhall)

The 1996 Cincinnati Reds season was the 127th season for the franchise in Major League Baseball, and their 27th and 26th full season at Cinergy Field. The Reds failed to improve on their record of 85–59 from 1995 and defend their National League Central title, finishing the season at 81–81 and a third place finish.

== Offseason ==
- December 7, 1995: Chris Sabo was signed as a free agent with the Cincinnati Reds.
- January 2, 1996: Eric Davis was signed as a free agent with the Cincinnati Reds.
- January 9, 1996: Mike Kelly was traded by the Atlanta Braves to the Cincinnati Reds for a player to be named later and Chad Fox. The Cincinnati Reds sent Ray King (June 11, 1996) to the Atlanta Braves to complete the trade.
- January 20, 1996: Vince Coleman signed as a free agent with the Cincinnati Reds.
- February 26, 1996: Joe Oliver was signed as a free agent with the Cincinnati Reds.
- February 26, 1996: Damon Berryhill was released by the Cincinnati Reds.

== Regular season ==
- Opening Day (April 1) – Seven pitches into the first game of the season, at Riverfront Stadium in Cincinnati, home plate umpire John McSherry collapses on the field and dies of a massive heart attack. The game between the Reds and Montreal Expos is postponed. Reds owner Marge Schott later comes under fire for wanting the game in Cincinnati to continue despite the tragedy (and against the wishes of the players on both teams), saying that she felt "cheated" when it was canceled.

=== Opening Day lineup ===
April 1 (game postponed)

- Vince Coleman, LF
- Hal Morris, 1B
- Barry Larkin, SS
- Reggie Sanders, RF
- Eddie Taubensee, C
- Bret Boone, 2B
- Mike Kelly, CF
- Jeff Branson, 3B
- Pete Schourek, P

April 2

- Eric Davis, LF
- Eric Owens, 2B
- Barry Larkin, SS
- Reggie Sanders, RF
- Chris Sabo, 3B
- Hal Morris, 1B
- Mike Kelly, CF
- Joe Oliver, C
- Pete Schourek, P

Note: the two lineups have multiple differences, as the Expos had scheduled right-hander Pedro Martínez to start on April 1; he was replaced by left-hander Jeff Fassero for the April 2 game.

=== Season standings ===
NL Central
Team	W	L	Pct.	GB	Home	Road
St. Louis Cardinals	88	74	.543	—	48‍–‍33	40‍–‍41
Houston Astros	82	80	.506	6	48‍–‍33	34‍–‍47
Cincinnati Reds	81	81	.500	7	46‍–‍35	35‍–‍46
Chicago Cubs	76	86	.469	12	43‍–‍38	33‍–‍48
Pittsburgh Pirates	73	89	.451	15	36‍–‍44	37‍–‍45

=== Record vs. opponents ===
1996 National League record Source: MLB Standings Grid – 1996
Team	ATL	CHC	CIN	COL	FLA	HOU	LAD	MON	NYM	PHI	PIT	SD	SF	STL
Atlanta	—	7–5	7–5	5–7	6–7	6–6	5–7	10–3	7–6	9–4	9–3	9–4	7–5	9–4
Chicago	5–7	—	5–8	5–7	6–6	5–8	8–5	6–6	7–5	7–6	4–9	6–6	7–5	5–8
Cincinnati	5–7	8–5	—	7–6	3–9	7–6	4–8	3–9	6–6	10–2	5–8	9–3	9–4	5–8
Colorado	7–5	7–5	6–7	—	5–8	8–5	6–7	3–9	7–5	6–6	7–5	8–5	5–8	8–4
Florida	7–6	6–6	9–3	8–5	—	7–5	6–7	5–8	7–6	6–7	5–7	3–9	5–7	6–6
Houston	6–6	8–5	6–7	5–8	5–7	—	6–6	4–9	8–4	10–2	8–5	6–6	8–4	2–11
Los Angeles	7–5	5–8	8–4	7–6	7–6	6–6	—	9–3	8–4	7–6	6–6	5–8	7–6	8–4
Montreal	3–10	6–6	9–3	9–3	8–5	9–4	3–9	—	7–6	6–7	7–5	4–8	9–4	8–4
New York	6–7	5–7	6–6	5–7	6–7	4–8	4–8	6–7	—	7–6	8–5	3–10	6–6	5–7
Philadelphia	4–9	6–7	2–10	6–6	7–6	2–10	6–7	7–6	6–7	—	7–5	4–8	6–6	4–8
Pittsburgh	3–9	9–4	8–5	5–7	7–5	5–8	6–6	5–7	5–8	5–7	—	4–9	8–4	3–10
San Diego	4–9	6–6	3–9	5–8	9–3	6–6	8–5	8–4	10–3	8–4	9–4	—	11–2	4–8
San Francisco	5–7	5–7	4–9	8–5	7–5	4–8	6–7	4–9	6–6	6–6	4–8	2–11	—	7–6
St. Louis	4–9	8–5	8–5	4–8	6–6	11–2	4–8	4–8	7–5	8–4	10–3	8–4	6–7	—

=== Game log ===
1996 Game Log: 81–81 (Home: 46–35; Away: 35–46)
April: 9–16 (Home: 5–8; Away: 4–8)

#	Date	Opponent	Score	Win	Loss	Save	Attendance	Record
	April 1	Expos	Postponed (death of umpire John McSherry) Rescheduled for April 2					0–0
1	April 2	Expos	4–1	**Schourek** (1–0)	Fassero	**Moore** (1)	53,136	1–0
2	April 3	Expos	4–8	Veres	**Shaw** (0–1)	—	19,104	1–1
3	April 4	Expos	2–10	Paniagua	**Burba** (0–1)	—	17,067	1–2
4	April 5	@ Phillies	6–5 (10)	**Shaw** (1–1)	Borland	**Moore** (2)	17,318	2–2
5	April 6	@ Phillies	8–4	**Salkeld** (1–0)	Hunter	—	17,958	3–2
	April 7	@ Phillies	Postponed (rain) Rescheduled for July 22					3–2
6	April 8	Mets	7–6	**Schourek** (2–0)	Jones	**Brantley** (1)	17,623	4–2
7	April 9	Mets	5–12	Isringhausen	**Smiley** (0–1)	Franco	15,958	4–3
8	April 10	Mets	9–7	**Pugh** (1–0)	Macdonald	**Brantley** (2)	16,775	5–3
9	April 11	Astros	4–9	Reynolds	**Portugal** (0–1)	—	18,946	5–4
10	April 12	Astros	8–10 (10)	Jones	**Moore** (0–1)	Tabaka	24,960	5–5
	April 13	Astros	Postponed (rain) Rescheduled for April 14					5–5
11	April 14	Astros	5–3	**Schourek** (3–0)	Hampton	**Brantley** (3)	—	6–5
12	April 14	Astros	9–8	**Shaw** (2–1)	Young	**Brantley** (4)	21,552	7–5
13	April 15	@ Cubs	3–2 (10)	**Moore** (1–1)	Patterson	**Brantley** (5)	20,395	8–5
14	April 16	@ Cubs	3–6	Trachsel	**Portugal** (0–2)	—	11,464	8–6
15	April 17	@ Cubs	6–8 (10)	Wendell	**Ruffin** (0–1)	—	13,023	8–7
16	April 19	@ Astros	5–13	Brocail	**Schourek** (3–1)	—	22,728	8–8
17	April 20	@ Astros	6–1	**Smiley** (1–1)	Drabek	—	34,098	9–8
18	April 21	@ Astros	5–7	Jones	**Brantley** (0–1)	—	27,845	9–9
19	April 22	@ Mets	1–5	Wilson	**Portugal** (0–3)	—	14,568	9–10
20	April 23	@ Mets	6–8 (10)	Henry	**Shaw** (2–2)	—	14,357	9–11
21	April 24	@ Expos	6–7 (10)	Dyer	**Moore** (1–2)	—	10,126	9–12
22	April 25	@ Expos	4–8	Martinez	**Smiley** (1–2)	—	13,067	9–13
23	April 26	Phillies	0–2	Grace	**Burba** (0–2)	Bottalico	21,842	9–14
24	April 27	Phillies	2–3	Leiper	**Portugal** (0–4)	Bottalico	22,555	9–15
	April 28	Phillies	Postponed (rain) Rescheduled for June 25					9–15
25	April 30	Pirates	7–10	Neagle	**Smiley** (1–3)	Cordova	16,243	9–16

May: 10–12 (Home: 5–6; Away: 5–6)

#	Date	Opponent	Score	Win	Loss	Save	Attendance	Record
26	May 1	Pirates	3–4	Hope	**Burba** (0–3)	Plesac	18,197	9–17
27	May 3	@ Giants	5–3	**McElroy** (1–0)	Creek	**Brantley** (6)	12,884	10–17
28	May 4	@ Giants	9–7	**Moore** (2–2)	Leiter	**Brantley** (7)	18,989	11–17
29	May 5	@ Giants	12–6	**Smiley** (2–3)	VanLandingham	—	18,052	12–17
30	May 7	Dodgers	3–2 (12)	**Moore** (3–2)	Worrell	—	18,147	13–17
31	May 8	Dodgers	5–0	**Schourek** (4–1)	Park	**Shaw** (1)	17,820	14–17
32	May 10	Padres	8–6	**McElroy** (2–0)	Florie	**Brantley** (8)	22,508	15–17
33	May 11	Padres	1–0	**Smiley** (3–3)	Hamilton	**Brantley** (9)	24,983	16–17
34	May 12	Padres	0–5	Tewksbury	**Burba** (0–4)	—	22,786	16–18
35	May 14	Rockies	3–5	Reed	**Schourek** (4–2)	Ruffin	20,535	16–19
	May 15	Rockies	Postponed (rain) Rescheduled for August 17					16–19
36	May 17	@ Braves	2–8	Maddux	**Smiley** (3–4)	—	40,612	16–20
37	May 18	@ Braves	1–2	Clontz	**Ruffin** (0–2)	Wohlers	49,553	16–21
38	May 19	@ Braves	5–9	Smoltz	**Schourek** (4–3)	Wohlers	41,153	16–22
39	May 20	Marlins	3–5	Rapp	**Burba** (0–5)	Nen	18,023	16–23
40	May 21	Marlins	2–3	Weathers	**Salkeld** (1–1)	Mathews	19,534	16–24
41	May 22	Marlins	4–1	**Smiley** (4–4)	Leiter	**Brantley** (10)	22,055	17–24
42	May 23	@ Rockies	7–5	**Carrasco** (1–0)	Ruffin	**Brantley** (11)	48,040	18–24
43	May 24	@ Rockies	11–9	**Ruffin** (1–2)	Thompson	—	48,019	19–24
44	May 25	@ Rockies	5–7	Leskanic	**Moore** (3–3)	—	48,012	19–25
	May 26	@ Rockies	Postponed (rain) Rescheduled for August 29					19–25
45	May 27	@ Marlins	2–6	Leiter	**Smiley** (4–5)	—	15,919	19–26
46	May 28	@ Marlins	2–6	Brown	**Burba** (0–6)	Mathews	14,052	19–27
	May 29	@ Marlins	Postponed (rain) Rescheduled for August 23					19–27
47	May 31	Braves	1–9	Avery	**Schourek** (4–4)	—	33,455	19–28

June: 17–11 (Home: 9–6; Away: 8–5)

#	Date	Opponent	Score	Win	Loss	Save	Attendance	Record
48	June 1	Braves	3–2	**Portugal** (1–4)	Maddux	**Brantley** (12)	34,023	20–28
49	June 2	Braves	2–6	Glavine	**Smiley** (4–6)	—	23,482	20–29
50	June 3	Giants	3–6	VanLandingham	**Burba** (0–7)	—	20,028	20–30
51	June 4	Giants	4–1	**Salkeld** (2–1)	Watson	**Brantley** (13)	28,549	21–30
52	June 5	Giants	4–15	Gardner	**Jarvis** (0–1)	—	21,881	21–31
	June 6	Giants	Postponed (rain) Rescheduled for September 6					21–31
53	June 7	@ Dodgers	2–1	**Smiley** (5–6)	Valdez	**Brantley** (14)	35,197	22–31
54	June 8	@ Dodgers	4–5 (10)	Worrell	**Carrasco** (1–1)	—	44,575	22–32
55	June 9	@ Dodgers	2–3	Nomo	**Smith** (0–1)	Worrell	47,847	22–33
56	June 10	@ Padres	6–3	**Smith** (1–1)	Bochtler	**Brantley** (15)	41,120	23–33
57	June 11	@ Padres	4–1	**Jarvis** (1–1)	Valenzuela	**Brantley** (16)	12,029	24–33
58	June 12	@ Padres	9–4	**Smiley** (6–6)	Florie	—	11,411	25–33
59	June 14	Expos	1–6	Martinez	**Portugal** (1–5)	—	26,691	25–34
60	June 15	Expos	5–6	Rueter	**Burba** (0–8)	Rojas	32,833	25–35
61	June 16	Expos	7–0	**Salkeld** (3–1)	Cormier	—	25,657	26–35
62	June 17	@ Astros	4–5	Young	**Shaw** (2–3)	Jones	24,977	26–36
63	June 18	@ Astros	6–4 (10)	**Brantley** (1–1)	Hernandez	—	20,505	27–36
64	June 19	@ Astros	10–7	**Portugal** (2–5)	Hampton	**Brantley** (17)	38,218	28–36
65	June 20	@ Mets	5–3	**Burba** (1–8)	Jones	**Shaw** (2)	16,994	29–36
66	June 21	@ Mets	4–9	Dipoto	**Salkeld** (3–2)	Mlicki	19,432	29–37
67	June 22	@ Mets	2–5	Clark	**Schourek** (4–5)	Franco	24,589	29–38
68	June 23	@ Mets	2–1	**Smiley** (7–6)	Person	**Brantley** (18)	18,593	30–38
69	June 24	Phillies	7–0	**Portugal** (3–5)	Schilling	—	20,835	31–38
70	June 25	Phillies	9–1	**Burba** (2–8)	Quirico	—	—	32–38
71	June 25	Phillies	3–1	**Jarvis** (2–1)	Mimbs	**Smith** (1)	23,369	33–38
72	June 26	Phillies	4–2	**Salkeld** (4–2)	Williams	**Brantley** (19)	32,286	34–38
73	June 28	Cubs	7–4	**Smiley** (8–6)	Castillo	**Smith** (2)	27,864	35–38
74	June 29	Cubs	9–5	**Portugal** (4–5)	Bullinger	—	32,273	36–38
75	June 30	Cubs	0–6	Trachsel	**Burba** (2–9)	—	30,352	36–39

July: 16–12 (Home: 7–6; Away: 9–6)

#	Date	Opponent	Score	Win	Loss	Save	Attendance	Record
76	July 1	@ Cardinals	8–5	**Carrasco** (2–1)	Benes	**Brantley** (20)	27,221	37–39
77	July 2	@ Cardinals	3–4	Honeycutt	**Smith** (1–2)	Eckersley	29,074	37–40
78	July 3	@ Cardinals	0–4	Osborne	**Smiley** (8–7)	—	32,658	37–41
79	July 4	@ Cubs	2–1	**Portugal** (5–5)	Bullinger	**Brantley** (21)	38,047	38–41
80	July 5	@ Cubs	3–0	**Burba** (3–9)	Trachsel	**Brantley** (22)	40,743	39–41
81	July 6	@ Cubs	2–6	Patterson	**Carrasco** (2–2)	—	38,690	39–42
82	July 7	@ Cubs	6–7 (13)	Sturtze	**Ruffin** (1–3)	—	36,352	39–43
83	July 11	Pirates	3–5	Neagle	**Smiley** (8–8)	Plesac	24,670	39–44
84	July 12	Pirates	5–2	**Portugal** (6–5)	Darwin	**Brantley** (23)	27,708	40–44
85	July 13	Pirates	3–0	**Jarvis** (3–1)	Lieber	—	32,119	41–44
86	July 14	Pirates	7–6	**Burba** (4–9)	Wagner	**Brantley** (24)	26,619	42–44
87	July 15	Cardinals	3–8	Morgan	**Salkeld** (4–3)	—	38,450	42–45
88	July 16	Cardinals	4–5	Osborne	**Shaw** (2–4)	Eckersley	23,370	42–46
89	July 17	Cardinals	4–6	Benes	**Portugal** (6–6)	Eckersley	28,879	42–47
90	July 18	@ Pirates	3–8	Lieber	**Jarvis** (3–2)	—	12,669	42–48
91	July 19	@ Pirates	11–3	**Burba** (5–9)	Wagner	—	17,153	43–48
92	July 20	@ Pirates	9–3	**Salkeld** (5–3)	Miceli	—	26,378	44–48
93	July 21	@ Pirates	4–6	Neagle	**Smiley** (8–9)	Plesac	23,117	44–49
94	July 22	@ Phillies	5–2	**Portugal** (7–6)	Mulholland	**Brantley** (25)	—	45–49
95	July 22	@ Phillies	5–3	**Smith** (2–2)	Ryan	**Brantley** (26)	22,808	46–49
96	July 23	@ Phillies	5–3	**Jarvis** (4–2)	Mimbs	—	23,100	47–49
97	July 24	@ Phillies	3–1	**Burba** (6–9)	Williams	**Brantley** (27)	27,352	48–49
98	July 26	Mets	7–4	**Smiley** (9–9)	Wilson	—	30,011	49–49
99	July 27	Mets	7–5	**Service** (1–0)	Clark	**Brantley** (28)	26,880	50–49
100	July 28	Mets	1–7	Jones	**Jarvis** (4–3)	—	25,094	50–50
101	July 29	Astros	1–2	Hampton	**Portugal** (7–7)	Wagner	22,163	50–51
102	July 30	Astros	5–4 (10)	**Shaw** (3–4)	Clark	—	27,015	51–51
103	July 31	Astros	10–0	**Smiley** (10–9)	Wall	—	26,082	52–51

August: 15–17 (Home: 8–6; Away: 7–11)

#	Date	Opponent	Score	Win	Loss	Save	Attendance	Record
104	August 1	@ Expos	9–7	**Shaw** (4–4)	Dyer	**Brantley** (29)	13,725	53–51
105	August 2	@ Expos	1–11	Martinez	**Jarvis** (4–4)	—	12,988	53–52
106	August 3	@ Expos	2–6	Cormier	**Portugal** (7–8)	Rojas	17,184	53–53
107	August 4	@ Expos	3–7	Urbina	**Burba** (6–10)	Rojas	15,408	53–54
108	August 5	@ Giants	4–3	**Salkeld** (6–3)	VanLandingham	**Brantley** (30)	12,277	54–54
109	August 6	@ Giants	3–2	**Carrasco** (3–2)	Beck	**Brantley** (31)	12,434	55–54
110	August 7	@ Giants	2–9	Gardner	**Jarvis** (4–5)	—	15,829	55–55
111	August 9	Dodgers	9–4	**Portugal** (8–8)	Valdez	—	34,004	56–55
112	August 10	Dodgers	5–7	Nomo	**Burba** (6–11)	Worrell	33,830	56–56
113	August 11	Dodgers	5–10	Osuna	**Carrasco** (3–3)	—	27,897	56–57
114	August 12	Dodgers	5–6	Martinez	**Smiley** (10–10)	Worrell	21,677	56–58
115	August 13	Padres	10–4	**Jarvis** (5–5)	Hamilton	—	20,205	57–58
116	August 14	Padres	2–1 (13)	**Smith** (3–2)	Bergman	—	20,983	58–58
117	August 15	Padres	3–2	**Burba** (7–11)	Tewksbury	**Brantley** (32)	23,143	59–58
118	August 16	Rockies	4–8	Reynoso	**Salkeld** (6–4)	—	28,878	59–59
119	August 17	Rockies	5–3	**Smiley** (11–10)	Munoz	**Brantley** (33)	—	60–59
120	August 17	Rockies	9–5	**Shaw** (5–4)	Reed	—	34,225	61–59
121	August 18	Rockies	9–4	**Jarvis** (6–5)	Ritz	**Shaw** (3)	24,883	62–59
122	August 19	Rockies	3–6	Thompson	**Portugal** (8–9)	—	22,670	62–60
123	August 20	@ Braves	1–4	Glavine	**Burba** (7–12)	Wohlers	32,658	62–61
124	August 21	@ Braves	3–4	Borbon	**Brantley** (1–2)	—	29,213	62–62
125	August 22	@ Braves	3–2 (13)	**Carrasco** (4–3)	Borowski	**Brantley** (34)	31,729	63–62
126	August 23	@ Marlins	6–5	**Carrara** (1–0)	Valdes	**Brantley** (35)	—	64–62
127	August 23	@ Marlins	3–8	Leiter	**Jarvis** (6–6)	—	21,497	64–63
128	August 24	@ Marlins	3–5	Brown	**Burba** (7–13)	Nen	33,883	64–64
129	August 25	@ Marlins	5–6	Nen	**Smith** (3–3)	—	27,372	64–65
130	August 26	@ Rockies	5–9 (7)	Swift	**Jarvis** (6–7)	Bailey	48,093	64–66
131	August 27	@ Rockies	4–3	**Smiley** (12–10)	Reynoso	**Brantley** (36)	50,046	65–66
132	August 28	@ Rockies	9–10	Ruffin	**Shaw** (5–5)	—	48,057	65–67
133	August 29	@ Rockies	18–7	**Burba** (8–13)	Thompson	—	48,029	66–67
134	August 30	Marlins	1–3	Brown	**Remlinger** (0–1)	—	22,485	66–68
135	August 31	Marlins	22–8	**Jarvis** (7–7)	Miller	—	25,196	67–68

September: 14–13 (Home: 12–3; Away: 2–10)

#	Date	Opponent	Score	Win	Loss	Save	Attendance	Record
136	September 1	Marlins	1–6	Hutton	**Smiley** (12–11)	—	25,521	67–69
137	September 2	Braves	7–6	**Shaw** (6–5)	McMichael	**Brantley** (37)	20,879	68–69
138	September 3	Braves	5–1	**Burba** (9–13)	Bielecki	**Shaw** (4)	18,844	69–69
139	September 4	Braves	12–6	**Salkeld** (7–4)	Glavine	—	19,532	70–69
140	September 6	Giants	0–2	Fernandez	**Smiley** (12–12)	Beck	—	70–70
141	September 6	Giants	14–1	**Morgan** (1–0)	Bourgeois	—	23,091	71–70
142	September 7	Giants	7–5	**Salkeld** (8–4)	Scott	**Brantley** (38)	22,790	72–70
143	September 8	Giants	8–3	**Shaw** (7–5)	Bautista	—	20,838	73–70
144	September 9	@ Dodgers	2–7	Martinez	**Jarvis** (7–8)	—	29,081	73–71
145	September 10	@ Dodgers	4–5	Candiotti	**Salkeld** (8–5)	Worrell	28,237	73–72
146	September 11	@ Dodgers	2–3	Valdez	**Smiley** (12–13)	Worrell	27,527	73–73
147	September 13	@ Padres	3–1	**Morgan** (2–0)	Ashby	**Brantley** (39)	26,524	74–73
148	September 14	@ Padres	2–3 (12)	Veras	**Smith** (3–4)	—	25,231	74–74
149	September 15	@ Padres	0–8	Hamilton	**Jarvis** (7–9)	Blair	29,005	74–75
150	September 17	@ Pirates	3–5	Cordova	**Smiley** (12–14)	Ericks	7,551	74–76
151	September 18	@ Pirates	3–5	Schmidt	**Morgan** (2–1)	Plesac	7,924	74–77
152	September 19	@ Pirates	4–6	Peters	**Pugh** (1–1)	Ericks	10,188	74–78
153	September 20	Cardinals	4–2	**Burba** (10–13)	Benes	**Brantley** (40)	23,496	75–78
	September 21	Cardinals	Postponed (rain) Rescheduled for September 22					75–78
154	September 22	Cardinals	6–3	**Shaw** (8–5)	Mathews	**Brantley** (41)	—	76–78
155	September 22	Cardinals	6–0	**Smiley** (13–14)	Jackson	—	38,225	77–78
156	September 23	Cardinals	2–3	Stottlemyre	**Morgan** (2–2)	Eckersley	17,313	77–79
157	September 24	Cubs	6–3	**Lyons** (1–0)	Navarro	**Brantley** (42)	18,584	78–79
158	September 25	Cubs	4–3	**Burba** (11–13)	Foster	**Brantley** (43)	18,506	79–79
159	September 26	Cubs	12–4	**Jarvis** (8–9)	Swartzbaugh	—	20,777	80–79
160	September 27	@ Cardinals	1–2 (11)	Batchelor	**Shaw** (8–6)	—	39,730	80–80
161	September 28	@ Cardinals	2–5	Jackson	**Morgan** (2–3)	Honeycutt	52,876	80–81
162	September 29	@ Cardinals	6–3	**Lyons** (2–0)	Ludwick	**Brantley** (44)	51,379	81–81

Legend: = Win = Loss
Bold = Reds team member

=== Detailed records ===
National League
Opponent	W	L	WP	RS	RA
NL East
Atlanta Braves	5	7	0.417	45	59
Florida Marlins	3	9	0.250	54	62
Montreal Expos	3	9	0.250	48	77
New York Mets	6	6	0.500	56	72
Philadelphia Phillies	10	2	0.833	57	27
Total	27	33	0.450	260	297
NL Central
Chicago Cubs	8	5	0.615	63	55
**Cincinnati Reds**					
Houston Astros	7	6	0.538	78	73
Pittsburgh Pirates	5	8	0.385	65	63
St. Louis Cardinals	5	8	0.385	49	50
Total	25	27	0.481	255	241
NL West
Colorado Rockies	7	6	0.538	92	81
Los Angeles Dodgers	4	8	0.333	48	53
San Diego Padres	9	3	0.750	48	38
San Francisco Giants	9	4	0.692	75	63
Total	29	21	0.580	263	235
Season Total	81	81	0.500	778	773

Month	Games	Won	Lost	Win %	RS	RA
April	25	9	16	0.360	125	163
May	22	10	12	0.455	94	108
June	28	17	11	0.607	128	112
July	28	16	12	0.571	129	110
August	32	15	17	0.469	176	179
September	27	14	13	0.519	126	101
Total	162	81	81	0.500	778	773

	Games	Won	Lost	Win %	RS	RA
Home	81	46	35	0.568	413	363
Away	81	35	46	0.432	365	410
Total	162	81	81	0.500	778	773

=== Notable transactions ===
- April 2, 1996: Scott Service was signed as a free agent with the Cincinnati Reds.
- May 27, 1996: Lee Smith was traded by the California Angels to the Cincinnati Reds for Chuck McElroy.
- June 18, 1996: Vince Coleman was released by the Cincinnati Reds.
- July 30, 1996: Kevin Mitchell was traded by the Boston Red Sox to the Cincinnati Reds for Roberto Mejía and Brad Tweedie (minors).
- July 30, 1996: Eric Anthony was purchased by the Colorado Rockies from the Cincinnati Reds.

==== Draft picks ====
- June 4, 1996: Buddy Carlyle was drafted by the Cincinnati Reds in the 2nd round of the 1996 amateur draft. Player signed June 21, 1996.

=== Roster ===
1996 Cincinnati Reds
**Roster**
**Pitchers**: 45 Jeff Brantley; 34 Dave Burba; 40 Giovanni Carrara; 58 Héctor Carrasco; 37 Xavier Hernandez; 32 Kevin Jarvis; 37 Derek Lilliquist; 59 Curt Lyons; 39 Pedro Martínez; 31 Chuck McElroy; 53 Marcus Moore; 31 Mike Morgan; 21 Mark Portugal; 40,53 Tim Pugh; 43 Mike Remlinger; 26 Johnny Ruffin; 42 Roger Salkeld; 46 Pete Schourek; 36 Scott Service; 41 Jeff Shaw; 57 John Smiley; 47 Lee Smith; 48 Jerry Spradlin; 56 Scott Sullivan	**Catchers**: 51 Brook Fordyce; 9 Joe Oliver; 10 Eddie Taubensee; **Infielders**: 39 Tim Belk; 29 Bret Boone; 20,45 Jeff Branson; 12 Willie Greene; 11 Barry Larkin; 23 Hal Morris; 30 Eduardo Pérez; 17 Chris Sabo	**Outfielders**: 19 Eric Anthony; 30 Vince Coleman; 44 Eric Davis; 33 Steve Gibralter; 00 Curtis Goodwin; 28 Lenny Harris; 22 Thomas Howard; 15 Mike Kelly; 7 Keith Mitchell; 7 Kevin Mitchell; 54 Chad Mottola; 18 Eric Owens; 16 Reggie Sanders	**Manager**: 25 Ray Knight; **Coaches**: 50 Marc Bombard (Third base); 35 Don Gullett (Pitching); 72 Tom Hume (Bullpen); 4 Hal McRae (Hitting); 55 Jim Lett (Bench); 2 Joel Youngblood (First base)

== Player stats ==
=== Batting ===
==== Starters by position ====
Note: Pos = Position; G = Games played; AB = At bats; H = Hits; Avg. = Batting average; HR = Home runs; RBI = Runs batted in

Pos	Player	G	AB	H	Avg.	HR	RBI
C	Joe Oliver	106	289	70	.242	11	46
1B	Hal Morris	142	528	165	.313	16	80
2B	Bret Boone	142	520	121	.233	12	69
SS	Barry Larkin	152	517	154	.298	33	89
3B	Willie Greene	115	287	70	.244	19	63
LF	Eric Owens	88	205	41	.200	0	9
CF	Eric Davis	129	415	119	.287	26	83
RF	Reggie Sanders	81	287	72	.251	14	33

==== Other batters ====
Note: G = Games played; AB = At bats; H = Hits; Avg. = Batting average; HR = Home runs; RBI = Runs batted in

Player	G	AB	H	Avg.	HR	RBI
Thomas Howard	121	360	98	.272	6	42
Ed Taubensee	108	327	95	.291	12	48
Jeff Branson	129	311	76	.244	9	37
Lenny Harris	125	302	86	.285	5	32
Curtis Goodwin	49	136	31	.228	0	5
Chris Sabo	54	125	32	.256	3	16
Eric Anthony	47	123	30	.244	8	13
Kevin Mitchell	37	114	37	.325	6	26
Vince Coleman	33	84	13	.155	1	4
Chad Mottola	35	79	17	.215	3	6
Mike Kelly	19	49	9	.184	1	7
Eduardo Pérez	18	36	8	.222	3	5
Keith Mitchell	11	15	4	.267	1	3
Tim Belk	7	15	3	.200	0	0
Brook Fordyce	4	7	2	.286	0	1
Steve Gibralter	2	2	0	.000	0	0

=== Pitching ===
==== Starting pitchers ====
Note: G = Games pitched; IP = Innings pitched; W = Wins; L = Losses; ERA = Earned run average; SO = Strikeouts

Player	G	IP	W	L	ERA	SO
John Smiley	35	217.1	13	14	3.64	171
Dave Burba	34	195.0	11	13	3.83	148
Mark Portugal	27	156.0	8	9	3.98	93
Kevin Jarvis	24	120.1	8	9	5.98	63
Pete Schourek	12	67.1	4	5	6.01	54
Mike Morgan	5	27.1	2	3	2.30	19
Curt Lyons	3	16.0	2	0	4.50	14

==== Other pitchers ====
Note: G = Games pitched; IP = Innings pitched; W = Wins; L = Losses; ERA = Earned run average; SO = Strikeouts

Player	G	IP	W	L	ERA	SO
Roger Salkeld	29	116.0	8	5	5.20	82
Giovanni Carrara	8	23.0	1	0	5.87	13

==== Relief pitchers ====
Note: G = Games pitched; W = Wins; L = Losses; SV = Saves; ERA = Earned run average; SO = Strikeouts

Player	G	W	L	SV	ERA	SO
Jeff Brantley	66	1	2	44	2.41	76
Jeff Shaw	78	8	6	4	2.49	69
Héctor Carrasco	56	4	3	0	3.75	59
Johnny Ruffin	49	1	3	0	5.49	69
Lee Smith	43	3	4	2	4.06	35
Scott Service	34	1	0	0	3.94	46
Marcus Moore	23	3	3	2	5.81	27
Mike Remlinger	19	0	1	0	5.60	19
Chuck McElroy	12	2	0	0	6.57	13
Tim Pugh	10	1	1	0	11.49	9
Scott Sullivan	7	0	0	0	2.25	3
Derek Lilliquist	5	0	0	0	7.36	1
Pedro Martínez	4	0	0	0	6.00	3
Xavier Hernandez	3	0	0	0	13.50	3
Jerry Spradlin	1	0	0	0	0.00	0

== Farm system ==
Level	Team	League	Manager
AAA	Indianapolis Indians	American Association	Dave Miley
AA	Chattanooga Lookouts	Southern League	Mark Berry
A	Winston-Salem Warthogs	Carolina League	Phillip Wellman
A	Charleston Alley Cats	South Atlantic League	Tommy Thompson and Donnie Scott
Rookie	Princeton Reds	Appalachian League	Mark Wagner
Rookie	Billings Mustangs	Pioneer League	Matt Martin
