= Rich Hunter =

American baseball player (born 1974)

- Pitcher
- Born: September 25, 1974 (age 50); Pasadena, California
- Batted: Right Threw: Right

MLB debut
- April 6, 1996, for the Philadelphia Phillies

Last MLB appearance
- September 29, 1996, for the Philadelphia Phillies

MLB statistics
- Win–loss record: 3–7
- Earned run average: 6.49
- Strikeouts: 32
- Stats at Baseball Reference

Teams
- Philadelphia Phillies (1996)

Career highlights and awards
- Paul Owens Award (1995)

Richard Thomas Hunter (born September 25, 1974) is a former Major League Baseball pitcher who played in 1996 with the Philadelphia Phillies. In 1995, Hunter went a combined 19–2 with a 2.73 ERA between the Piedmont Boll Weevils, Clearwater Phillies, and Reading Phillies. As a result, he was a winner of the Paul Owens Award, given annually to the top pitcher and position player in the Phillies' farm system (David Doster and Wendell Magee were co-winners among position players).
