= Keith Mitchell (baseball) =

American baseball player (born 1969)

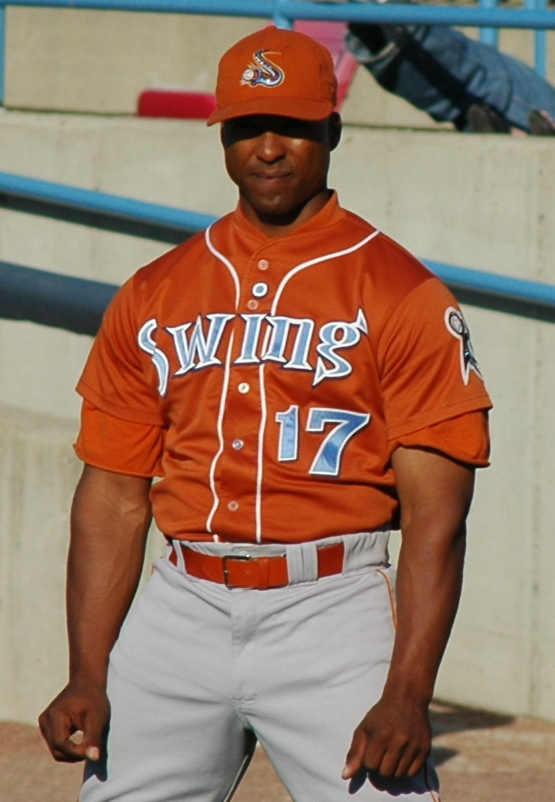
- Mitchell with the Swing of the Quad Cities as a coach in 2005
- Outfielder
- Born: August 6, 1969 (age 57); San Diego, California, U.S.
- Batted: Right Threw: Right

Professional debut
- MLB: July 23, 1991, for the Atlanta Braves
- KBO: 2000, for the Haitai Tigers

Last appearance
- MLB: September 27, 1998, for the Boston Red Sox
- KBO: 2000, for the Haitai Tigers

MLB statistics
- Batting average: .260
- Home runs: 8
- Runs batted in: 29

KBO statistics
- Batting average: .227
- Home runs: 8
- Runs batted in: 38
- Stats at Baseball Reference

Teams
- Atlanta Braves (1991); Seattle Mariners (1994); Cincinnati Reds (1996); Boston Red Sox (1998); Haitai Tigers (2000)

Keith Alexander Mitchell (born August 6, 1969) is an American former professional baseball player and coach. He played parts of four seasons in Major League Baseball (MLB) for the Atlanta Braves, Seattle Mariners, Cincinnati Reds and Boston Red Sox. He also played in the KBO League for the Haitai Tigers.

== Career ==
Mitchell was drafted by the Braves in the fourth round of the 1987 MLB draft. He debuted with the Braves on July 23, 1991, and hit .318 in 48 games that season, but that was his only MLB season with Atlanta. He did, however, earn some playing time as the left fielder for the Braves in that year's postseason.

All his stints in the MLB were short and far apart from one another. In 1994, he played in 46 games with the Mariners and in 1996, he played in 11 games with the Reds. His MLB career ended two years later in 1998 after playing 23 games with the Red Sox. While playing for the Mariners, he was the third out in John Valentin's unassisted triple play on July 8, 1994.

In 128 games over four seasons, Mitchell posted a .260 batting average with 38 runs, 8 home runs and 29 RBI.

In 2005, Mitchell was named the hitting coach of the Swing of the Quad Cities, a minor league affiliate of the St. Louis Cardinals. 2006–07, Mitchell served as the Quad Cities' manager. In 2008, he was the hitting coach of the Palm Beach Cardinals.

== Personal life ==
Mitchell is a cousin of Kevin Mitchell.
