= Glenn Murray (baseball) =

American baseball player (born 1970)

- Outfielder
- Born: November 23, 1970 (age 55); Manning, South Carolina, U.S.
- Batted: Right Threw: Right

MLB debut
- May 10, 1996, for the Philadelphia Phillies

Last MLB appearance
- July 24, 1996, for the Philadelphia Phillies

MLB statistics
- Batting average: .196
- Home runs: 2
- Runs batted in: 6
- Stats at Baseball Reference

Teams
- Philadelphia Phillies (1996)

Glenn Murray (born November 23, 1970) is an American former outfielder from Manning, South Carolina, who made his Major League Baseball debut in 1996 with the Philadelphia Phillies. In his debut with the Philadelphia Phillies he collected his first hit against the Atlanta Braves.

After playing 38 games he collected 19 hits with 2 home runs and 6 runs batted in.

== Career ==
Glenn Murray was drafted in the second round of the 1989 free-agent draft by the Montreal Expos. After hitting 26 home runs and 96 RBI in 1993 for the Expos AA minor league team the Harrisburg Senators, Murray was traded by Montreal to the Red Sox on March 23, 1994 for Derek Vineyard. Murray's stay in the Red Sox organization lasted until January 1996 when the Boston Red Sox sent him, with Ken Ryan and Lee Tinsley, to the Philadelphia Phillies for Rick Holyfield, Heathcliff Slocumb and Larry Wimberly.

Murray played 38 games in the major leagues with the Philadelphia Phillies. His first game was on May 10, 1996 and last on July 24, 1996. He appeared in 11 games solely as a pinch hitter and 27 in the outfield (24 in right field, 2 in center field, and 1 in left field). In October of that season, Murray was claimed on waivers by the Cincinnati Reds.

On May 20, 1998, Glenn Murray was part of an unusual feat in baseball while playing for AAA Indianapolis Indians in a game against Pawtucket. In the 5th inning of the game, Pete Rose Jr. hit a solo home run, Jason Willims hit a 3-run home run, Murray added a grand slam, and Guillermo Garcia completed the "homer cycle" with a 2-run shot. The Indians won the game, 11-4.

In 1999, Murray joined the Nashua Pride of the Atlantic League. He stayed there until 2006, the year that Nashua switched to the Can-Am League, though he began the 2001 and 2002 seasons in the Mexican League. In 2003 in Nashua, he bat .252 with 23 home runs and 67 RBI. In 2005 in Nashua, he bat .265 with 31 home runs and 98 RBI. In 477 games with Nashua, he has hit .275 with 106 home runs and 358 RBI.

In 1,529 career games in the minor leagues, Murray has hit .255 with 275 home runs, 923 RBI, and 197 stolen bases.
