= Tim Belk =

American baseball player (born 1970)

- First baseman
- Born: April 6, 1970 (age 55); Cincinnati, Ohio
- Batted: Right Threw: Right

MLB debut
- June 25, 1996, for the Cincinnati Reds

Last MLB appearance
- July 3, 1996, for the Cincinnati Reds

MLB statistics
- Batting average: .200
- Games played: 7
- At bats: 15
- Stats at Baseball Reference

Teams
- Cincinnati Reds (1996)

Timothy William Belk (born April 6, 1970) is a former professional first baseman who played one season for the Cincinnati Reds of Major League Baseball. He made his Major League debut on June 25, 1996, and played his final game on July 3, 1996. He was drafted by the Reds on June 1, 1992 and signed with them on June 4, 1992. He was later traded to the Detroit Tigers on March 20, 1998, for Kevin Baez, but did not play a game.
