= Ken Ryan =

American baseball player (born 1968)

- Pitcher
- Born: October 24, 1968 (age 57); Pawtucket, Rhode Island, U.S.
- Batted: Right Threw: Right

MLB debut
- August 31, 1992, for the Boston Red Sox

Last MLB appearance
- May 15, 1999, for the Philadelphia Phillies

MLB statistics
- Win–loss record: 14–16
- Earned run average: 3.91
- Strikeouts: 225
- Stats at Baseball Reference

Teams
- Boston Red Sox (1992–1995); Philadelphia Phillies (1996–1999)

Kenneth Frederick Ryan, Jr. (born October 24, 1968), is an American former baseball pitcher. He played eight seasons in Major League Baseball for the Boston Red Sox and Philadelphia Phillies.

== Professional career ==
Ryan was born in Pawtucket, Rhode Island. After graduating in 1986 from Seekonk High School in Seekonk, Massachusetts, Ryan was signed as an undrafted free agent by the Boston Red Sox. He received an $11,000 signing bonus, forgoing an offer to play college baseball for the Maine Black Bears.

He worked his way through the Red Sox minor league system and made his MLB debut on August 31, 1992. Ryan spent the next three years splitting time between the Red Sox and the minors. He had a team-leading and career-high 13 saves in the strike-shortened 1994 season.

On January 29, 1996, he was traded with Lee Tinsley and Glenn Murray to the Philadelphia Phillies for Heathcliff Slocumb, Larry Wimberly, and Rick Holifield. In 1996, he pitched in a career-high 62 MLB games, going 3–5 with 8 saves and a 2.43 ERA. He spent the next three seasons pitching for both the Phillies and their minor league affiliates. He last pitched in the majors on May 15, 1999, taking the loss after allowing one run in one inning. He pitched in Triple-A until the Phillies released him on August 22.

Ryan signed with the Pittsburgh Pirates on August 26, 1999 He played for the Triple-A Nashville Sounds until the Pirates released him at the end of the season.

During the 1999–2000 off-season, Ryan signed with the New York Yankees. He pitched four times for the Triple-A Columbus Clippers. He spent most of the 2000 season pitching for the Nashua Pride of the independent Atlantic League. He collected 24 saves in 40 relief appearances and helped the Pride win the league title. Ryan then retired from professional baseball.

After retiring, Ryan was a broadcaster for the Boston Red Sox in 2007 and the Triple-A Pawtucket Red Sox from 2012 to 2015.

== Personal life ==
Ryan married Odalys Rodriguez in Lakeland, Florida in 1991. He currently lives in Seekonk, Massachusetts, with his wife and three daughters, Julia, Amanda, and Kelli Rose.

Ryan is the owner of the KR Baseball Academy, an instructional facility for young players, in Lincoln, Rhode Island.
