= Carlos Crawford =

American baseball player (born 1971)

- Pitcher
- Born: October 4, 1971 (age 54); Charlotte, North Carolina, U.S.
- Batted: Right Threw: Right

MLB debut
- June 7, 1996, for the Philadelphia Phillies

Last MLB appearance
- June 7, 1996, for the Philadelphia Phillies

MLB statistics
- Win–loss record: 0–1
- Earned run average: 4.91
- Strikeouts: 4
- Stats at Baseball Reference

Teams
- Philadelphia Phillies (1996)

Carlos Lamonte Crawford (born October 4, 1971) is an American former professional baseball right-handed pitcher, who played in one game for the Philadelphia Phillies of Major League Baseball (MLB) in 1996.

Crawford was drafted by the Cleveland Indians in the 51st round of the 1990 amateur draft. He played his first professional season with their Rookie league Burlington Indians in 1991, and his last with the Pittsburgh Pirates' Rookie league Gulf Coast Pirates, the Double-A Carolina Mudcats, and the Triple-A Nashville Sounds in 1998.

He made his Major League debut on June 7, 1996. Having not having slept the night before due to excitement, Crawford allowed ten runs, two earned and eight unearned, in less than four innings pitched. Crawford's bright spots in his lone MLB game were recording four strikeouts, with one being against All-Star Jeff Bagwell. As of 2022, his eight unearned runs allowed are the most in a Major League debut since unearned runs became an official statistic in 1913.
