= Curt Lyons =

American baseball player (born 1974)

- Starting pitcher
- Born: October 17, 1974 (age 50); Greencastle, Indiana, U.S.
- Batted: Right Threw: Right

MLB debut
- September 19, 1996, for the Cincinnati Reds

Last MLB appearance
- September 29, 1996, for the Cincinnati Reds

MLB statistics
- Win–loss record: 2–0
- Earned run average: 4.50
- Strikeouts: 14

Teams
- Cincinnati Reds (1996)

Curt Russell Lyons (born October 17, 1974) is an American former professional baseball player. A pitcher, Lyons played three games of Major League Baseball with the Cincinnati Reds in 1996. His baseball career ended in 2000 with the Akron Aeros of Minor League Baseball.
