= St. Joseph High School (Virgin Islands) =

Private school in Frederiksted, U.S. Virgin Islands

Location
- 3 Mt Pleasant, Route 2 Frederiksted, St. Croix, U.S. Virgin Islands 00840; United States
- Coordinates: 17°42′49″N 64°52′58″W

Information
- Type: Private, Coeducational
- Religious affiliation: Roman Catholic
- CEEB code: 550240
- Principal: Ms. Colleen Williams
- Grades: 9–12
- Accreditation: Middle States Association of Colleges and Schools
- Website: https://saintjhs.com/

St. Joseph High School is a private, Roman Catholic high school in Frederiksted, U.S. Virgin Islands on St. Croix. The head of school is Mrs. Skalkos. It is located within the Roman Catholic Diocese of St. Thomas and is the only Catholic high school on St. Croix.

== Background ==
St. Joseph High School was established in 1961.
