= Rafael Quirico =

Dominican baseball player (born 1969)

- Pitcher
- Born: September 7, 1969 (age 56); Santo Domingo, Dominican Republic
- Batted: Left Threw: Left

MLB debut
- June 25, 1996, for the Philadelphia Phillies

Last MLB appearance
- June 25, 1996, for the Philadelphia Phillies

MLB statistics
- Win–loss record: 0–1
- Earned run average: 37.80
- Strikeouts: 1
- Stats at Baseball Reference

Teams
- Philadelphia Phillies (1996)

Rafael Octavio Quirico Dottin (born September 7, 1969) is a Dominican former Major League Baseball pitcher. He appeared in one game for the Philadelphia Phillies in 1996. He was called up from the minor leagues to make a start in the first game of a doubleheader against the Cincinnati Reds on June 25, but lasted just 1 2/3 innings, giving up seven runs on four hits, walking five batters while striking out just one. He was returned to the minor leagues, where he pitched one more season before his career ended.
