= Damian Rolls =

American baseball player (born 1977)

- Utility player
- Born: September 15, 1977 (age 48); Manhattan, Kansas, U.S.
- Batted: Right Threw: Right

MLB debut
- September 3, 2000, for the Tampa Bay Devil Rays

Last MLB appearance
- October 3, 2004, for the Tampa Bay Devil Rays

MLB statistics
- Batting average: .248
- Home runs: 9
- Runs batted in: 73
- Stats at Baseball Reference

Teams
- Tampa Bay Devil Rays (2000–2004)

Damian Michael Rolls (born September 15, 1977) is an American former Major League Baseball player. He was the hitting coach for the Kansas City T-Bones.

Rolls was drafted by the Los Angeles Dodgers as the 23rd pick in the 1st round in 1996, but was claimed by the Kansas City Royals in the 1999 Rule 5 draft and immediately traded to the Tampa Bay Devil Rays. He played all or part of the 2000-2004 with Tampa Bay, playing several different positions, most often as a third baseman.

Rolls was released by the Devil Rays on November 23, 2004. On January 21, 2005, he signed with the New York Yankees, but was released on May 1, 2006. Rolls signed on May 10 with the Chicago White Sox and played for their Triple-A affiliate, the Charlotte Knights. On June 7, 2006, Rolls was released after batting only .182 in 17 games. After his release, he signed with the Bridgeport Bluefish of the Atlantic League where he played well, batting .315 in 74 games.

For 2007, Rolls signed with the Long Island Ducks, where his season was cut short by injury. He re-signed with the Ducks for the 2008 season, then went on to play for the Kansas City T-Bones in 2009, mostly as a first baseman. He retired after the season and rejoined the team as hitting coach.

In 2011 The Rockland Boulders, an American professional baseball team based in Pomona, New York in the County of Rockland and member of the Canadian American Association of Professional Baseball hired Rolls to serve as the club’s hitting coach for the 2011 season.

== See also ==
- Rule 5 draft results
