= Zhu Dawei (historian) =

Chinese historian (1931–2020)

Zhu Dawei (朱大渭; 1931 – 8 April 2020) was a Chinese historian. Born in Sichuan, Xizhong, he was author of The Social History of the Six Dynasties and many other books on the Six Dynasties era. In 1991, he was awarded special expert status by the State Council of the People's Republic of China and, in 2006, elected emeritus academician of the Chinese Academy of Social Sciences. Zhu died on 8 April 2020, at the age of 89.
