= Lee Tinsley =

American baseball player (1969–2023)

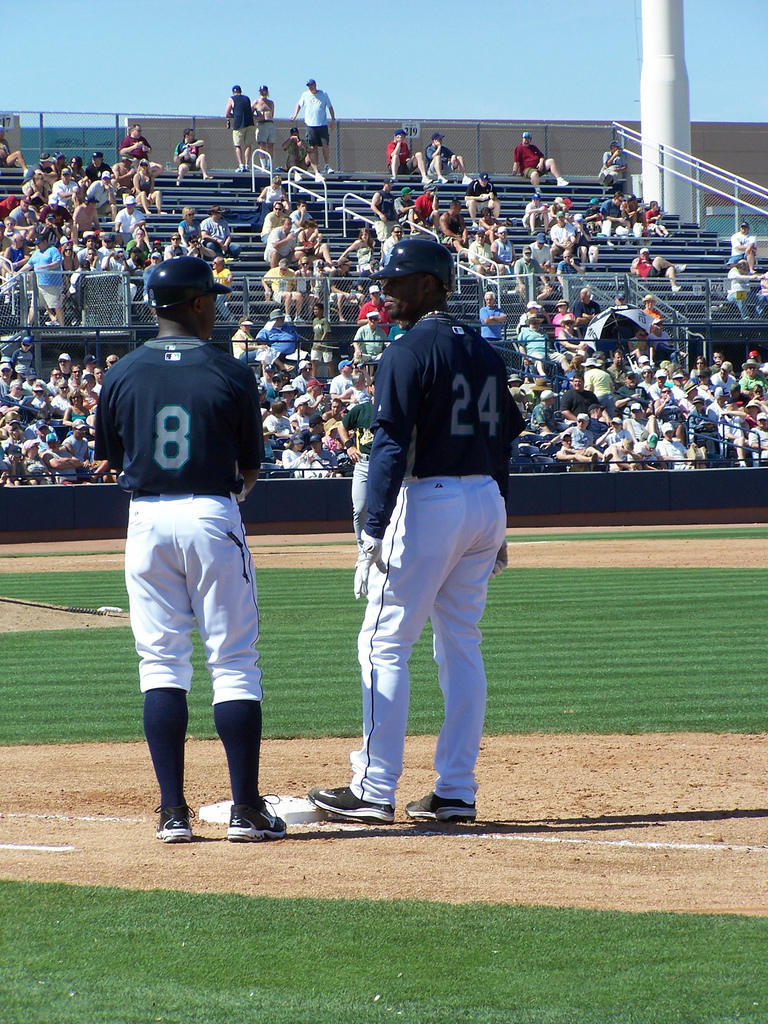
- Tinsley (left) talking to Ken Griffey Jr.
- Outfielder
- Born: March 4, 1969; Shelbyville, Kentucky, U.S.
- Died: January 12, 2023 (aged 53); Scottsdale, Arizona, U.S.
- Batted: Switch Threw: Right

MLB debut
- April 6, 1993, for the Seattle Mariners

Last MLB appearance
- September 28, 1997, for the Seattle Mariners

MLB statistics
- Batting average: .241
- Home runs: 13
- Runs batted in: 79
- Stats at Baseball Reference

Teams
- As player: Seattle Mariners (1993); Boston Red Sox (1994–1995); Philadelphia Phillies (1996); Boston Red Sox (1996); Seattle Mariners (1997); As coach: Arizona Diamondbacks (2006–2008); Seattle Mariners (2009–2010); Cincinnati Reds (2014–2015)

Lee Owen Tinsley (March 4, 1969 – January 12, 2023) was an American professional baseball outfielder. He played in Major League Baseball (MLB) from 1993 to 1997 for the Seattle Mariners, Boston Red Sox and Philadelphia Phillies. Tinsley later served as a coach in MLB for seven seasons, between 2006 and 2015.

== Playing career ==
=== Oakland Athletics ===
Tinsley was drafted in the first round of the 1987 MLB draft out of Shelby County High School in Shelbyville, Kentucky. He began his professional career that year with the Medford A's of the Northwest League. In 1989 and 1990, Tinsley played with the Madison Muskies of the Midwest League. In 1991, he was promoted to the AA Huntsville Stars of the Southern League, where he hit .224 in 92 games.

=== Cleveland Indians ===
On July 26, 1991, Tinsley was traded by the Athletics (along with another minor leaguer) to the Cleveland Indians for Brook Jacoby. He played with the Canton–Akron Indians of the Eastern League through 1992. Tinsley was then promoted to the AAA Colorado Springs Sky Sox to finish the 1992 season.

=== Seattle Mariners ===
Tinsley was selected off waivers by the Seattle Mariners on September 21, 1992. He spent most of 1993 with the Calgary Cannons in the Pacific Coast League, where he hit .302 in 111 games. Tinsley made his Major League debut on April 6, 1993, against the Toronto Blue Jays, pinch hitting in the fifth inning and remaining in the game to play left field. He walked once and struck out once in two plate appearances.

Tinsley collected his first Major League hit on April 11, 1993, with a ninth inning pinch-hit single off Baltimore's Gregg Olson, eventually scoring the tying run to send the game into extra-innings. He hit his first home run on July 21, 1993, off Steve Farr of the New York Yankees. In 11 games with the Mariners, Tinsley had three hits in 19 at-bats for a .158 batting average.

=== Boston Red Sox / Philadelphia Phillies ===
Tinsley was traded to the Boston Red Sox on March 22, 1994, for a player to be named later. He hit .222 in 78 games for them in 1994, while tying a club record by going 13-for-13 in stolen base attempts in his first full year in the majors. Tinsley opened the 1995 campaign with a 14-game hitting streak, while also making good on his first two stolen base attempts of the year to run his streak to a team record 15 in a row, dating back to 1994. Tinsley later had a career-best 15-game hitting streak from June 10–25, finishing the campaign with a .284 average in 100 games for Boston.

On January 29, 1996, the Red Sox traded Tinsley (along with Glenn Murray and Ken Ryan) to the Philadelphia Phillies in exchange for Heathcliff Slocumb and two minor leaguers. He appeared in 31 games for the Phillies before being dealt back to Boston on June 9. Tinsley appeared in 92 of the Red Sox' final 102 games and hit .245.

=== Back to Seattle ===
Tinsley was dealt to Seattle prior to the 1997 season, which was an injury-riddled campaign for Tinsley, who started 19 of Seattle's first 24 games, but was eventually sidelined in May with an injured right elbow. He was then activated on August 1, returning to the lineup two days later, but was placed back on the D.L. on August 21. He hit only .197 that season in 49 games.

=== Later career ===
Tinsley never returned to the Majors, but he spent 1998–99 in AAA with the affiliates of the Anaheim Angels, Montreal Expos and Cincinnati Reds. In 2000, he played in the independent Western Baseball League with the Valley Vipers and then moved to the Mexican League where he finished off the season.

== Coaching career ==
Tinsley made his coaching debut as the hitting coach for the El Paso Diablos, Arizona's AA affiliate, in 2001. He left the organization for a year to serve as the roving outfield instructor for the Angels' minor league system, then returned to the Diamondbacks' chain in 2003, serving as the minor league outfield co-ordinator. He was the first-base coach for the Diamondbacks from 2006 to 2008.

On December 1, 2008, Tinsley was named first base coach of the Seattle Mariners, a position he held through 2010.

Tinsley was the minor league outfield/baserunning coordinator for the Chicago Cubs from 2011 to 2013. He was named the manager of the Ogden Raptors for 2014, but chose to join the Cincinnati Reds as assistant hitting coach instead. On October 22, 2015, Tinsley did not have his contract renewed by the Reds.

== Personal life and death ==
Tinsley had three children. On January 12, 2023, he died in Scottsdale, Arizona, at the age of 53.

Preceded by Brett Butler	Arizona Diamondbacks first base coach 2006–2008	Succeeded by Lorenzo Bundy
