= Bronson Heflin =

American baseball player (born 1971)

- Pitcher
- Born: August 29, 1971 (age 54); Clarksville, Tennessee, U.S.
- Batted: Right Threw: Right

MLB debut
- August 1, 1996, for the Philadelphia Phillies

Last MLB appearance
- 1996, for the Philadelphia Phillies

MLB statistics
- Win–loss record: 0–0
- Earned run average: 6.75
- Strikeouts: 4
- Stats at Baseball Reference

Teams
- Philadelphia Phillies (1996)

Bronson Wayne Heflin (born August 29, 1971) is an American former professional baseball pitcher, who played in Major League Baseball (MLB) for the 1996 Philadelphia Phillies.

Heflin was drafted by the Phillies in the 37th round (1,038th overall) of the 1994 Major League Baseball draft. He played his first professional season with their Class A (Short Season) Batavia Clippers in 1994, and his last with the Pittsburgh Pirates' Triple-A Nashville Sounds in 2000.
