= Larry Mitchell (baseball) =

American baseball player (born 1971)

- Pitcher
- Born: October 16, 1971 (age 54); Flint, Michigan, U.S.
- Batted: Right Threw: Right

MLB debut
- August 11, 1996, for the Philadelphia Phillies

Last MLB appearance
- September 2, 1996, for the Philadelphia Phillies

MLB statistics
- Win–loss record: 0–0
- Earned run average: 4.50
- Strikeouts: 7
- Stats at Baseball Reference

Teams
- Philadelphia Phillies (1996)

Larry Paul Mitchell (born October 16, 1971) is an American former professional baseball pitcher. He played in Major League Baseball (MLB) for the Philadelphia Phillies for one season in 1996.

== Career ==
Mitchell was selected by the Philadelphia Phillies in the fifth round, with the 137th overall selection, of the 1992 Major League Baseball draft.

Mitchell made his MLB debut on August 11, 1996. He made only seven appearances, all out of the bullpen in his career, all coming in August and September of 1996. In the contests, he recorded a 4.50 ERA with 7 strikeouts in 12.0 innings of work.

Mitchell's final professional season came in 1998, a season he split between the Double–A Bowie Baysox of the Baltimore Orioles organization and the Double–A Birmingham Barons of the Chicago White Sox organization. In 6 games split between the two affiliates, he struggled immensely to a cumulative 19.06 ERA with 2 strikeouts in 5 2/3 innings of work.

== Personal life ==
Mitchell founded a small start-up in August 2012 called "Freeagent Pros", which provides lesson referrals for all kinds of sports.
