= Zhu Dawei (baseball) =

Chinese baseball player

Zhu Dawei 朱大卫
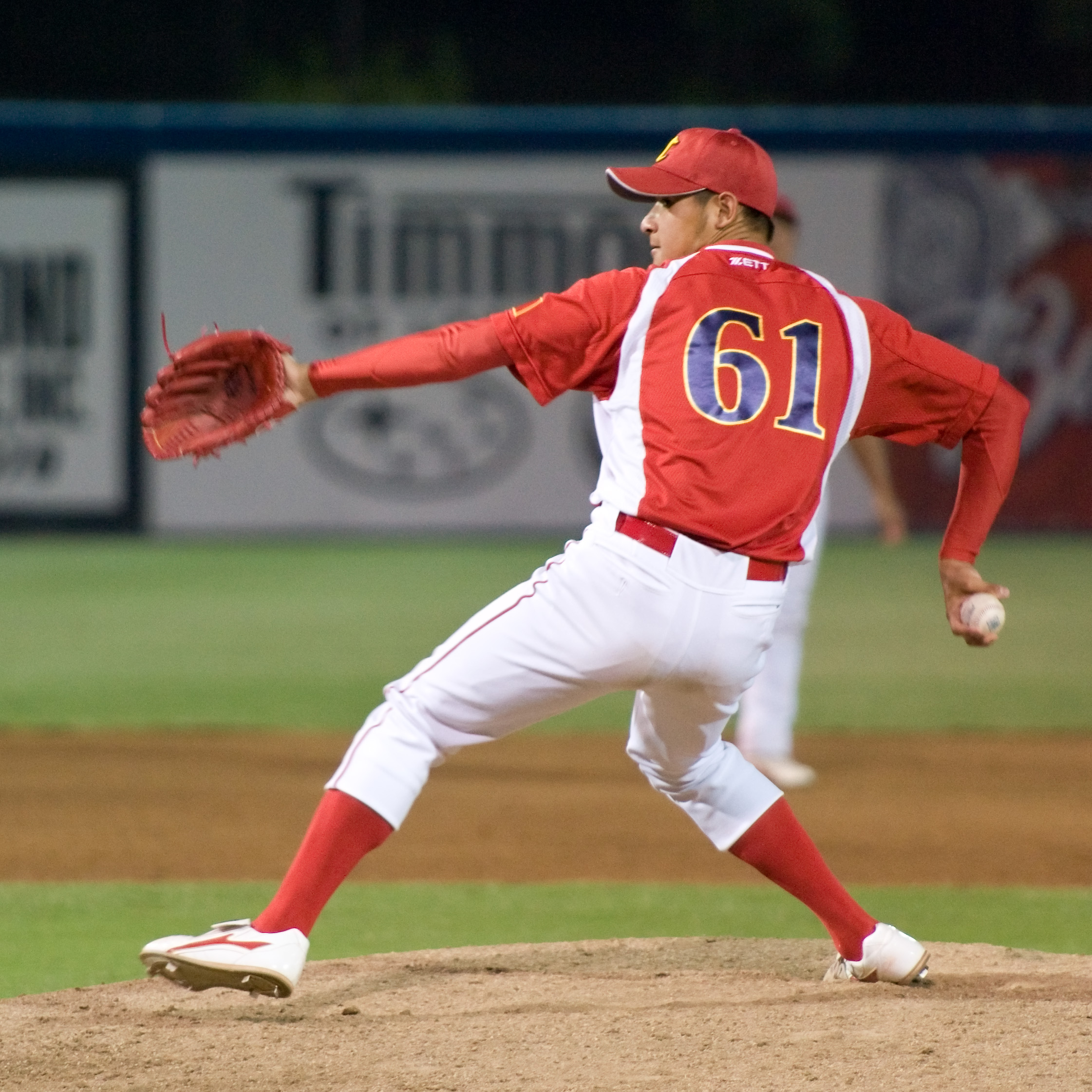
- Zhu with the China national baseball team in 2008
- Pitcher
- Born: 25 July 1988 (age 37); Shanghai, China
- Bats: Right Throws: Right

Teams
- Saitama Seibu Lions (2007–2011)

Zhu Dawei (simplified Chinese: 朱大卫; traditional Chinese: 朱大衛; pinyin: Zhū Dàwèi; born 25 July 1988 in Shanghai, China) is a Chinese baseball pitcher for the Saitama Seibu Lions. He was a member of the China national baseball team in the 2009 World Baseball Classic
