= Wendell Magee =

American baseball player (born 1972)

- Outfielder
- Born: August 3, 1972 (age 54); Hattiesburg, Mississippi, U.S.
- Batted: Right Threw: Right

MLB debut
- August 16, 1996, for the Philadelphia Phillies

Last MLB appearance
- September 1, 2002, for the Detroit Tigers

MLB statistics
- Batting average: .247
- Home runs: 24
- Runs batted in: 122
- Stats at Baseball Reference

Teams
- Philadelphia Phillies (1996–1999); Detroit Tigers (2000–2002)

Wendell Errol Magee (born August 3, 1972) is an American former Major League Baseball player who played outfield from 1996 to 2002 for the Philadelphia Phillies and Detroit Tigers. Magee also played for the Long Island Ducks of the Atlantic League in 2004–2005.

== Career ==
Magee played football at Hattiesburg High School in Mississippi but was never picked to play on the school's baseball team. He accepted a scholarship to play college football at Tennessee State on the condition that he be allowed to play for the school's baseball team as well. However, after one season, coaches told Magee that he would not be allowed to play baseball because he was too valuable as a baseball player. Magee then transferred to Pearl River Community College in Poplarville, Mississippi, to play football for his former high school coach as well as college baseball. After one season at Pearl River, Magee transferred to Samford University where he played baseball and football as a running back (under head coaches Terry Bowden and Chan Gailey) for the Samford Bulldogs. He was later inducted into the athletics halls of fame for both Peral River and Samford. He was selected by the Philadelphia Phillies in the twelfth round of the 1994 Major League Baseball draft.

Magee was assigned to the Batavia Clippers of the New York–Penn League to begin his professional career in 1994. He made his Major League debut with the Phillies on August 16, 1996, at Veterans Stadium against the San Francisco Giants, pinch hitting for Mike Williams. Magee played parts of four seasons as an outfielder with the Phillies, never appearing in more than 38 games. Before the 2000 season, he was traded to the Detroit Tigers where he received substantially more playing time. By 2002, he was the team's starting center fielder, his first and only season as a starter.

In February 2003, he signed a free agent contract with the Cleveland Indians. The following month, he was traded to the Phillies for a player to be named later. He spent the 2003 season with the AAA affiliates of the Phillies, Tigers and Colorado Rockies. He spent the 2004 and 2005 seasons with the Long Island Ducks of the independent Atlantic League, his last in professional baseball.

== Personal life ==
In 2021, Magee wrote a book entitled Set the Captives Free which was published by Fulton Books. As of 2021, Magee lived in Hoover, Alabama. He is a lifelong friend of National Football League All-Pro Larry Whigham. His son, Josh, played three seasons of Minor League Baseball and also played college football as a wide receiver at UAB and South Alabama.
