= David Doster =

American baseball player (born 1970)

- Second baseman
- Born: October 8, 1970 (age 55); Fort Wayne, Indiana, U.S.
- Batted: Right Threw: Right

Professional debut
- MLB: June 16, 1996, for the Philadelphia Phillies
- NPB: March 30, 2001, for the Yokohama BayStars

Last appearance
- MLB: October 3, 1999, for the Philadelphia Phillies
- NPB: October 11, 2001, for the Yokohama BayStars

MLB statistics
- Batting average: .233
- Home runs: 4
- Runs batted in: 18

NPB statistics
- Batting average: .272
- Home runs: 9
- Runs batted in: 27
- Stats at Baseball Reference

Teams
- Philadelphia Phillies (1996, 1999); Yokohama BayStars (2001)

David Eric Doster (born October 8, 1970), is an American former professional baseball second baseman, who played Major League Baseball (MLB) with the Philadelphia Phillies, during the 1996 and 1999 seasons. Doster also played one season in Nippon Professional Baseball (NPB), with the Yokohama BayStars, in 2001.

Doster played baseball scholastically at New Haven High School and Indiana State University. He was drafted by the Phillies in the 27th round of the 1993 amateur draft. Professionally, Doster played his first season with the Minor League Baseball (MiLB) Class A Spartanburg Phillies, in 1993, and his last season with the Arizona Diamondbacks' Triple-A team, the Tucson Sidewinders, in 2005.

Doster had a good MiLB career: He won a Double-A title with the 1995 Reading Phillies, was a 2002 International League All-Star, and ranks 2nd on the Pacific Coast League's 'Consecutive Game Hit Streak List', with 32 games (trailing only Joe DiMaggio).

Doster is still currently involved in baseball. He is teaching lessons at Strike Zone Training Center in Fort Wayne. Doster is also a color commentary broadcaster for the Fort Wayne TinCaps.
