= Jon Zuber =

American baseball player (born 1969)

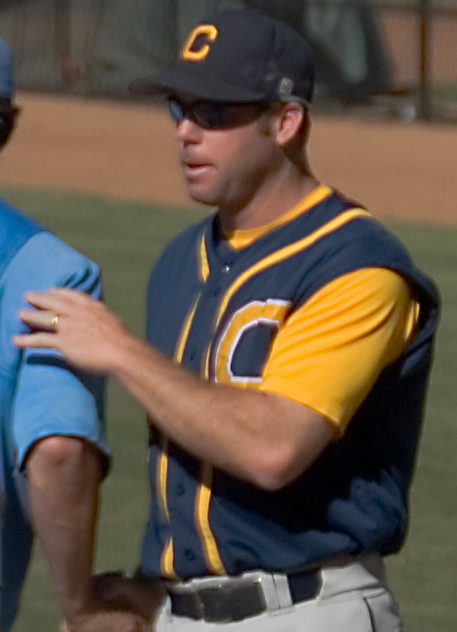
- Zuber at Cal in 2007
- First baseman
- Born: December 10, 1969 (age 55); Encino, California, U.S.
- Batted: Left Threw: Left

Professional debut
- MLB: April 19, 1996, for the Philadelphia Phillies
- NPB: March 30, 2001, for the Yokohama BayStars

Last appearance
- MLB: September 27, 1998, for the Philadelphia Phillies
- NPB: September 29, 2001, for the Yokohama BayStars

MLB statistics
- Batting average: .250
- Home runs: 3
- Runs batted in: 16

NPB statistics
- Batting average: .310
- Home runs: 2
- Runs batted in: 27
- Stats at Baseball Reference

Teams
- Philadelphia Phillies (1996, 1998); Yokohama BayStars (2001)
Medals
Men's baseball
Representing United States
Pan American Games
Silver medal – second place	1999 Winnipeg	Team competition

Jon Edward Zuber (born December 10, 1969) is an American former professional baseball first baseman. He played parts of two seasons in Major League Baseball (MLB) for the Philadelphia Phillies in 1996 and 1998. He also played one season in Nippon Professional Baseball (NPB) for the Yokohama BayStars in 2001. He is currently an assistant coach at his alma mater, The University of California, Berkeley.

== Early life ==
He attended Campolindo High School in Moraga, California.

Played American Legion baseball for Lafayette Generals Post 517 coached by Don Miller

== Career ==
Zuber was drafted by the Phillies in the 12th round of the 1992 MLB draft. He was a .250 career hitter over 68 major league games. He hit .253 in 1996 and .244 in 1998, though with 2 home runs in only 45 at bats for a .489 slugging percentage.
