= 1996 Pittsburgh Pirates season =

1996 Pittsburgh Pirates
- League: National League
- Division: Central
- Ballpark: Three Rivers Stadium
- City: Pittsburgh, Pennsylvania
- Record: 73–89 (.451)
- Divisional place: 5th
- Owners: Kevin McClatchy
- General managers: Cam Bonifay
- Managers: Jim Leyland
- Television: WPXI; Prime Sports KBL
- Radio: KDKA-AM (Steve Blass, Greg Brown, Lanny Frattare, Bob Walk)

The 1996 Pittsburgh Pirates season was the 115th season of the franchise; the 110th in the National League. This was their 27th season at Three Rivers Stadium. The Pirates finished fifth and last in the National League Central with a record of 73–89.

== Offseason ==
- December 28, 1995: Charlie Hayes was signed as a free agent by the Pirates.
- February 2, 1996: John DeSalvo was released by the Pirates (Injury).
- February 4, 1996: Danny Darwin was signed as a free agent by the Pirates.
- February 17, 1996: Zane Smith was signed as a free agent by the Pirates.

== Regular season ==
=== Season standings ===
NL Central
Team	W	L	Pct.	GB	Home	Road
St. Louis Cardinals	88	74	.543	—	48‍–‍33	40‍–‍41
Houston Astros	82	80	.506	6	48‍–‍33	34‍–‍47
Cincinnati Reds	81	81	.500	7	46‍–‍35	35‍–‍46
Chicago Cubs	76	86	.469	12	43‍–‍38	33‍–‍48
Pittsburgh Pirates	73	89	.451	15	36‍–‍44	37‍–‍45

=== Game log ===
1996 Game Log: 73–89 (Home: 36–44; Away: 37–45)
April: 12–14 (Home: 4–7; Away: 8–7)

#	Date	Opponent	Score	Win	Loss	Save	Attendance	Record
1	April 1	@ Marlins	4–0	**Wagner** (1–0)	Brown	—	41,815	1–0
2	April 2	@ Marlins	4–1	**Christiansen** (1–0)	Pena	**Miceli** (1)	20,243	2–0
3	April 4	@ Marlins	2–6	Leiter	**Ericks** (0–1)	—	19,008	2–1
4	April 5	@ Mets	7–5	**Smith** (1–0)	Mlicki	—	16,088	3–1
5	April 6	@ Mets	5–0	**Darwin** (1–0)	Clark	—	20,756	4–1
6	April 8	Phillies	3–6	Fernandez	**Neagle** (0–1)	—	41,416	4–2
7	April 10	Phillies	6–7	Grace	**Christiansen** (1–1)	Bottalico	7,075	4–3
8	April 11	Expos	5–6 (11)	Rojas	**Cordova** (0–1)	Veres	8,084	4–4
9	April 12	Expos	3–13	Rueter	**Darwin** (1–1)	—	13,087	4–5
10	April 13	Expos	9–3	**Wagner** (2–0)	Fassero	—	13,834	5–5
11	April 14	Expos	5–2	**Neagle** (1–1)	Martinez	—	12,797	6–5
12	April 15	@ Cardinals	4–6	Benes	**Ericks** (0–2)	Honeycutt	18,731	6–6
13	April 16	@ Cardinals	13–3	**Smith** (2–0)	Benes	**Lieber** (1)	21,349	7–6
14	April 17	@ Cardinals	1–6	Osborne	**Darwin** (1–2)	—	23,074	7–7
15	April 18	@ Cardinals	6–2	**Wagner** (3–0)	Stottlemyre	—	25,700	8–7
16	April 19	@ Expos	1–2	Manuel	**Plesac** (0–1)	—	13,256	8–8
17	April 20	@ Expos	2–11	Martinez	**Ericks** (0–3)	—	14,022	8–9
18	April 21	@ Expos	4–9	Veres	**Christiansen** (1–2)	—	11,361	8–10
19	April 22	@ Phillies	9–3	**Darwin** (2–2)	Mulholland	—	17,604	9–10
20	April 23	@ Phillies	2–6	Springer	**Wagner** (3–1)	Ryan	19,254	9–11
21	April 24	Marlins	6–3	**Neagle** (2–1)	Rapp	—	9,812	10–11
22	April 25	Marlins	1–4	Leiter	**Hope** (0–1)	Nen	8,315	10–12
23	April 26	Mets	10–6	**Christiansen** (2–2)	Isringhausen	—	13,185	11–12
24	April 27	Mets	4–7	Mlicki	**Miceli** (0–1)	Franco	16,698	11–13
25	April 28	Mets	5–7	Jones	**Wagner** (3–2)	Franco	27,706	11–14
26	April 30	@ Reds	10–7	**Neagle** (3–1)	Smiley	**Cordova** (1)	16,243	12–14

May: 9–18 (Home: 6–11; Away: 3–7)

#	Date	Opponent	Score	Win	Loss	Save	Attendance	Record
27	May 1	@ Reds	4–3	**Hope** (1–1)	Burba	**Plesac** (1)	18,197	13–14
28	May 3	Dodgers	1–10	Park	**Darwin** (2–3)	—	18,268	13–15
29	May 4	Dodgers	7–2	**Wagner** (4–2)	Candiotti	—	20,321	14–15
30	May 5	Dodgers	4–2	**Neagle** (4–1)	Valdez	**Plesac** (2)	19,206	15–15
31	May 6	Dodgers	4–8	Nomo	**Hope** (1–2)	Radinsky	9,415	15–16
32	May 8	Padres	4–5	Tewksbury	**May** (0–1)	Hoffman	—	15–17
33	May 8	Padres	4–3	**Christiansen** (3–2)	Sanders	**Cordova** (2)	8,508	16–17
34	May 9	Padres	1–7	Ashby	**Wagner** (4–3)	—	10,863	16–18
35	May 10	Giants	4–5 (10)	DeLucia	**Cordova** (0–2)	Beck	17,611	16–19
36	May 11	Giants	7–12	VanLandingham	**Hope** (1–3)	—	16,591	16–20
37	May 12	Giants	2–7	Watson	**Smith** (2–1)	—	17,132	16–21
38	May 13	@ Braves	3–9	Glavine	**Darwin** (2–4)	—	28,583	16–22
39	May 14	@ Braves	3–7	Smoltz	**Wagner** (4–4)	—	28,175	16–23
40	May 15	@ Braves	3–0	**Neagle** (5–1)	Avery	—	30,917	17–23
41	May 17	@ Astros	2–4	Reynolds	**Lieber** (0–1)	Jones	22,882	17–24
42	May 18	@ Astros	2–1 (11)	**Cordova** (1–2)	Young	**Plesac** (3)	21,010	18–24
43	May 19	@ Astros	3–4	Jones	**Lieber** (0–2)	—	18,815	18–25
44	May 20	@ Rockies	7–10	Reynoso	**Neagle** (5–2)	—	48,042	18–26
45	May 21	@ Rockies	10–12	Holmes	**Christiansen** (3–3)	Ruffin	48,037	18–27
46	May 22	@ Rockies	3–6	Ritz	**Smith** (2–2)	Ruffin	48,044	18–28
47	May 24	Braves	3–5	Smoltz	**Darwin** (2–5)	Wohlers	20,238	18–29
48	May 25	Braves	6–2	**Neagle** (6–2)	Avery	—	29,273	19–29
49	May 26	Braves	3–6 (13)	Wade	**Miceli** (0–2)	Bielecki	33,085	19–30
50	May 27	Astros	3–5	Kile	**Smith** (2–3)	—	8,906	19–31
51	May 28	Astros	6–5	**Miceli** (1–2)	Swindell	**Cordova** (3)	7,182	20–31
52	May 29	Astros	4–7	Morman	**Darwin** (2–6)	Jones	11,679	20–32
53	May 31	Rockies	8–4	**Neagle** (7–2)	Reynoso	**Cordova** (4)	26,640	21–32

June: 15–12 (Home: 5–5; Away: 10–7)

#	Date	Opponent	Score	Win	Loss	Save	Attendance	Record
54	June 1	Rockies	0–2	Ritz	**Wagner** (4–5)	Ruffin	15,633	21–33
55	June 2	Rockies	5–2	**Smith** (3–3)	Holmes	**Cordova** (5)	26,745	22–33
56	June 3	Rockies	7–2	**Ruebel** (1–0)	Farmer	—	8,120	23–33
57	June 4	@ Dodgers	3–0	**Darwin** (3–6)	Nomo	**Cordova** (6)	29,576	24–33
58	June 5	@ Dodgers	7–3	**Wilkins** (1–0)	Astacio	**Cordova** (7)	32,161	25–33
59	June 6	@ Dodgers	3–8	Candiotti	**Miceli** (1–3)	—	26,664	25–34
60	June 7	@ Padres	10–0	**Smith** (4–3)	Bergman	—	20,312	26–34
61	June 8	@ Padres	9–8 (14)	**Cordova** (2–2)	Blair	—	41,378	27–34
62	June 9	@ Padres	6–0	**Darwin** (4–6)	Tewksbury	—	30,932	28–34
63	June 10	@ Giants	5–4	**Morel** (1–0)	DeLucia	**Cordova** (8)	10,026	29–34
64	June 11	@ Giants	7–2	**Neagle** (8–2)	Fernandez	—	11,530	30–34
65	June 13	Marlins	3–4	Perez	**Cordova** (2–3)	Nen	15,083	30–35
66	June 14	Marlins	5–4	**Plesac** (1–1)	Nen	—	26,494	31–35
67	June 15	Marlins	12–8	**Darwin** (5–6)	Rapp	—	15,596	32–35
68	June 16	Marlins	2–4	Brown	**Neagle** (8–3)	Nen	28,120	32–36
69	June 17	Mets	6–7 (10)	Mlicki	**Cordova** (2–4)	Franco	11,002	32–37
70	June 19	Mets	6–5	**Plesac** (2–1)	Isringhausen	—	—	33–37
71	June 19	Mets	3–5	Mlicki	**Cordova** (2–5)	Franco	20,108	33–38
72	June 21	@ Marlins	0–4	Brown	**Darwin** (5–7)	—	20,442	33–39
73	June 22	@ Marlins	4–1 (10)	**Plesac** (3–1)	Perez	—	26,666	34–39
74	June 23	@ Marlins	5–3	**Lieber** (1–2)	Rapp	**Cordova** (9)	20,769	35–39
75	June 24	@ Expos	3–11	Martinez	**Dessens** (0–1)	—	23,736	35–40
76	June 25	@ Expos	2–8	Rueter	**Smith** (4–4)	Scott	12,776	35–41
77	June 26	@ Expos	3–1	**Darwin** (6–7)	Cormier	**Cordova** (10)	12,846	36–41
78	June 28	@ Cardinals	1–6	Osborne	**Neagle** (8–4)	—	34,490	36–42
79	June 29	@ Cardinals	5–6	Honeycutt	**Miceli** (1–4)	—	34,426	36–43
80	June 30	@ Cardinals	3–10	Stottlemyre	**Smith** (4–5)	—	38,901	36–44

July: 12–15 (Home: 10–7; Away: 2–8)

#	Date	Opponent	Score	Win	Loss	Save	Attendance	Record
81	July 1	Cubs	4–1	**Darwin** (7–7)	Navarro	**Plesac** (4)	15,910	37–44
82	July 2	Cubs	7–15	Telemaco	**Wagner** (4–6)	—	13,241	37–45
83	July 3	Cubs	3–2	**Neagle** (9–4)	Castillo	**Plesac** (5)	22,157	38–45
84	July 4	Cardinals	1–7	Benes	**Dessens** (0–2)	—	23,321	38–46
85	July 5	Cardinals	4–7	Stottlemyre	**Smith** (4–6)	Fossas	18,759	38–47
86	July 6	Cardinals	5–9	Benes	**Darwin** (7–8)	—	19,144	38–48
87	July 7	Cardinals	8–2	**Lieber** (2–2)	Morgan	—	16,255	39–48
88	July 11	@ Reds	5–3	**Neagle** (10–4)	Smiley	**Plesac** (6)	24,670	40–48
89	July 12	@ Reds	2–5	Portugal	**Darwin** (7–9)	Brantley	27,708	40–49
90	July 13	@ Reds	0–3	Jarvis	**Lieber** (2–3)	—	32,119	40–50
91	July 14	@ Reds	6–7	Burba	**Wagner** (4–7)	Brantley	26,619	40–51
92	July 15	@ Cubs	2–12	Castillo	**Miceli** (1–5)	—	32,119	40–52
93	July 16	@ Cubs	10–5	**Neagle** (11–4)	Navarro	—	26,502	41–52
94	July 18	Reds	8–3	**Lieber** (3–3)	Jarvis	—	12,669	42–52
95	July 19	Reds	3–11	Burba	**Wagner** (4–8)	—	17,153	42–53
96	July 20	Reds	3–9	Salkeld	**Miceli** (1–6)	—	26,378	42–54
97	July 21	Reds	6–4	**Neagle** (12–4)	Smiley	**Plesac** (7)	23,117	43–54
98	July 23	Expos	5–1	**Lieber** (4–3)	Martinez	—	10,292	44–54
99	July 24	Expos	5–4	**Ericks** (1–3)	Rojas	—	19,219	45–54
100	July 25	Phillies	6–4	**Miceli** (2–6)	Springer	**Cordova** (11)	12,163	46–54
101	July 26	Phillies	7–4	**Ericks** (2–3)	Bottalico	**Plesac** (8)	17,239	47–54
102	July 27	Phillies	1–2	Mulholland	**Parris** (0–1)	—	23,121	47–55
103	July 28	Phillies	12–8	**Ericks** (3–3)	Borland	—	15,189	48–55
104	July 29	@ Mets	0–5	Harnisch	**Peters** (0–1)	—	15,680	48–56
105	July 30	@ Mets	4–5	Isringhausen	**Cordova** (2–6)	Franco	—	48–57
106	July 30	@ Mets	3–4 (12)	Franco	**Lieber** (4–4)	—	18,378	48–58
107	July 31	@ Mets	2–3 (10)	Dipoto	**Plesac** (3–2)	—	15,787	48–59

August: 8–20 (Home: 3–10; Away: 5–10)

#	Date	Opponent	Score	Win	Loss	Save	Attendance	Record
108	August 1	@ Mets	13–9	**Morel** (2–0)	Mlicki	**Ericks** (1)	20,327	49–59
109	August 2	@ Phillies	8–3	**Wilkins** (2–0)	Blazier	—	24,505	50–59
110	August 3	@ Phillies	6–7	Bottalico	**Plesac** (3–3)	—	22,690	50–60
111	August 4	@ Phillies	2–4	Williams	**Miceli** (2–7)	Ryan	25,498	50–61
112	August 5	@ Phillies	0–3	Schilling	**Neagle** (12–5)	—	20,337	50–62
113	August 6	Dodgers	1–3	Astacio	**Parris** (0–2)	Worrell	11,824	50–63
114	August 7	Dodgers	12–2	**Lieber** (5–4)	Martinez	**Wilkins** (1)	12,232	51–63
115	August 8	Padres	3–12	Sanders	**Peters** (0–2)	—	8,388	51–64
116	August 9	Padres	1–4	Valenzuela	**Miceli** (2–8)	Hoffman	30,066	51–65
117	August 10	Padres	2–6	Veras	**Plesac** (3–4)	—	21,902	51–66
118	August 11	Padres	5–7	Bergman	**Parris** (0–3)	Hoffman	27,227	51–67
119	August 13	Giants	10–12	Dewey	**Plesac** (3–5)	Beck	11,378	51–68
120	August 14	Giants	4–3	**Peters** (1–2)	Estes	**Ericks** (2)	20,340	52–68
121	August 16	@ Braves	4–5	Smoltz	**Neagle** (12–6)	Wohlers	39,210	52–69
122	August 17	@ Braves	1–7	Bielecki	**Ruebel** (1–1)	—	49,024	52–70
123	August 18	@ Braves	1–2 (14)	Borowski	**Cordova** (2–7)	—	31,587	52–71
124	August 19	@ Astros	1–2 (13)	Morman	**Morel** (2–1)	—	15,067	52–72
125	August 20	@ Astros	4–9	Wall	**Miceli** (2–9)	Hernandez	19,866	52–73
126	August 21	@ Astros	5–2	**Neagle** (13–6)	Hampton	**Ericks** (3)	13,357	53–73
127	August 22	@ Astros	8–6	**Wilkins** (3–0)	Wagner	**Ericks** (4)	14,899	54–73
128	August 23	@ Rockies	5–3	**Lieber** (6–4)	Ritz	**Cordova** (12)	48,038	55–73
129	August 24	@ Rockies	3–9	Thompson	**Peters** (1–3)	—	48,014	55–74
130	August 25	@ Rockies	9–13	Munoz	**Wilkins** (3–1)	—	48,139	55–75
131	August 27	Braves	3–2	**Neagle** (14–6)	Smoltz	**Plesac** (9)	14,603	56–75
132	August 28	Braves	4–9	Wade	**Loaiza** (0–1)	—	14,591	56–76
133	August 29	Braves	1–5	Maddux	**Lieber** (6–5)	Wohlers	12,101	56–77
134	August 30	Astros	0–10	Wall	**Peters** (1–4)	—	24,619	56–78
135	August 31	Astros	4–5	Hernandez	**Ericks** (3–4)	Hudek	27,559	56–79

September: 17–10 (Home: 8–4; Away: 9–6)

#	Date	Opponent	Score	Win	Loss	Save	Attendance	Record
136	September 1	Astros	9–5	**Wainhouse** (1–0)	Darwin	—	14,144	57–79
137	September 2	Rockies	3–8	Ritz	**Loaiza** (0–2)	—	9,513	57–80
138	September 4	Rockies	5–2	**Lieber** (7–5)	Thompson	**Plesac** (10)	10,081	58–80
139	September 6	@ Dodgers	1–2	Osuna	**Wilkins** (3–2)	Worrell	41,509	58–81
140	September 7	@ Dodgers	3–4	Nomo	**Schmidt** (0–1)	Worrell	50,862	58–82
141	September 8	@ Dodgers	4–1	**Plesac** (4–5)	Dreifort	**Ericks** (5)	33,922	59–82
142	September 9	@ Padres	5–6	Hermanson	**Wilkins** (3–3)	Hoffman	15,727	59–83
143	September 10	@ Padres	5–6	Hoffman	**Boever** (0–1)	—	15,694	59–84
144	September 11	@ Padres	7–8	Bochtler	**Ericks** (3–5)	—	33,771	59–85
145	September 12	@ Giants	10–4	**Schmidt** (1–1)	Dewey	**Boever** (1)	8,214	60–85
146	September 13	@ Giants	9–0	**Loaiza** (1–2)	VanLandingham	—	9,888	61–85
147	September 14	@ Giants	7–5 (12)	**Ericks** (4–5)	Hook	**Boever** (2)	15,685	62–85
148	September 15	@ Giants	4–1	**Lieber** (8–5)	Rueter	**Ruebel** (1)	—	63–85
149	September 15	@ Giants	11–9 (10)	**Wilkins** (4–3)	Poole	—	21,998	64–85
150	September 17	Reds	5–3	**Cordova** (3–7)	Smiley	**Ericks** (6)	7,551	65–85
151	September 18	Reds	5–3	**Schmidt** (2–1)	Morgan	**Plesac** (11)	7,924	66–85
152	September 19	Reds	6–4	**Peters** (2–4)	Pugh	**Ericks** (7)	10,188	67–85
153	September 20	Cubs	6–4	**Lieber** (9–5)	Foster	**Ericks** (8)	19,285	68–85
154	September 21	Cubs	8–3	**Loiselle** (1–0)	Swartzbaugh	—	23,619	69–85
155	September 22	Cubs	11–3 (8)	**Cordova** (4–7)	Castillo	—	27,472	70–85
156	September 23	Cubs	3–4	Trachsel	**Schmidt** (2–2)	Patterson	7,684	70–86
157	September 24	Cardinals	1–7	Benes	**Loaiza** (1–3)	—	8,611	70–87
158	September 25	Cardinals	7–8 (11)	Bailey	**Miceli** (2–10)	Mathews	20,022	70–88
159	September 27	@ Cubs	7–4 (10)	**Plesac** (5–5)	Wendell	—	—	71–88
160	September 27	@ Cubs	9–10	Adams	**Boever** (0–2)	—	18,757	71–89
161	September 28	@ Cubs	8–7 (10)	**Plesac** (6–5)	Wendell	—	29,729	72–89
162	September 29	@ Cubs	8–3	**Loaiza** (2–3)	Navarro	—	26,873	73–89

Legend: = Win = Loss
Bold = Pirates team member

=== Record vs. opponents ===
1996 National League record Source: MLB Standings Grid – 1996
Team	ATL	CHC	CIN	COL	FLA	HOU	LAD	MON	NYM	PHI	PIT	SD	SF	STL
Atlanta	—	7–5	7–5	5–7	6–7	6–6	5–7	10–3	7–6	9–4	9–3	9–4	7–5	9–4
Chicago	5–7	—	5–8	5–7	6–6	5–8	8–5	6–6	7–5	7–6	4–9	6–6	7–5	5–8
Cincinnati	5–7	8–5	—	7–6	3–9	7–6	4–8	3–9	6–6	10–2	5–8	9–3	9–4	5–8
Colorado	7–5	7–5	6–7	—	5–8	8–5	6–7	3–9	7–5	6–6	7–5	8–5	5–8	8–4
Florida	7–6	6–6	9–3	8–5	—	7–5	6–7	5–8	7–6	6–7	5–7	3–9	5–7	6–6
Houston	6–6	8–5	6–7	5–8	5–7	—	6–6	4–9	8–4	10–2	8–5	6–6	8–4	2–11
Los Angeles	7–5	5–8	8–4	7–6	7–6	6–6	—	9–3	8–4	7–6	6–6	5–8	7–6	8–4
Montreal	3–10	6–6	9–3	9–3	8–5	9–4	3–9	—	7–6	6–7	7–5	4–8	9–4	8–4
New York	6–7	5–7	6–6	5–7	6–7	4–8	4–8	6–7	—	7–6	8–5	3–10	6–6	5–7
Philadelphia	4–9	6–7	2–10	6–6	7–6	2–10	6–7	7–6	6–7	—	7–5	4–8	6–6	4–8
Pittsburgh	3–9	9–4	8–5	5–7	7–5	5–8	6–6	5–7	5–8	5–7	—	4–9	8–4	3–10
San Diego	4–9	6–6	3–9	5–8	9–3	6–6	8–5	8–4	10–3	8–4	9–4	—	11–2	4–8
San Francisco	5–7	5–7	4–9	8–5	7–5	4–8	6–7	4–9	6–6	6–6	4–8	2–11	—	7–6
St. Louis	4–9	8–5	8–5	4–8	6–6	11–2	4–8	4–8	7–5	8–4	10–3	8–4	6–7	—

=== Detailed records ===
National League
Opponent	W	L	WP	RS	RA
NL East
Atlanta Braves	3	9	0.250	35	59
Florida Marlins	7	5	0.583	48	42
Montreal Expos	5	7	0.417	47	71
New York Mets	5	8	0.385	68	68
Philadelphia Phillies	5	7	0.417	62	57
Total	25	36	0.410	260	297
NL Central
Chicago Cubs	9	4	0.692	86	73
Cincinnati Reds	8	5	0.615	63	65
Houston Astros	5	8	0.385	51	65
**Pittsburgh Pirates**					
St. Louis Cardinals	3	10	0.231	59	79
Total	25	27	0.481	259	282
NL West
Colorado Rockies	5	7	0.417	65	73
Los Angeles Dodgers	6	6	0.500	50	45
San Diego Padres	4	9	0.308	62	72
San Francisco Giants	8	4	0.667	80	64
Total	23	26	0.469	257	254
Season Total	73	89	0.451	776	833

Month	Games	Won	Lost	Win %	RS	RA
April	26	12	14	0.462	131	131
May	27	9	18	0.333	111	151
June	27	15	12	0.556	125	118
July	27	12	15	0.444	122	145
August	28	8	20	0.286	120	164
September	27	17	10	0.630	167	124
Total	162	73	89	0.451	776	833

	Games	Won	Lost	Win %	RS	RA
Home	80	36	44	0.450	384	429
Away	82	37	45	0.451	392	404
Total	162	73	89	0.451	776	833

== Roster ==
1996 Pittsburgh Pirates
Roster
Pitchers: 44 Joe Boever; 41 Jason Christiansen; 26 Steve Cooke; 67 Francisco Córdova; 44 Danny Darwin; 71 Elmer Dessens; 57 John Ericks; 42 Lee Hancock; 29 John Hope; 47 Jon Lieber; 34 Esteban Loaiza; 75 Rich Loiselle; 61 Darrell May; 32 Dan Miceli; 55 Ramón Morel; 15 Denny Neagle; 27 Steve Parris; 38 Chris Peters; 19 Dan Plesac; 49 Matt Ruebel; 42 Jason Schmidt; 24 Zane Smith; 43 Paul Wagner; 53 Dave Wainhouse; 6 John DeSalvo; 53 Dave Wainhouse	Catchers: 2 Angelo Encarnación; 18 Jason Kendall; 63 Keith Osik; Infielders: 48 Rich Aude; 3 Jay Bell; 13 Carlos García; 17 Charlie Hayes; 36 Mark Johnson; 7 Jeff King; 16 Nelson Liriano; 17 Dale Sveum	Outfielders: 46 Jermaine Allensworth; 25 Trey Beamon; 5 Jacob Brumfield; 35 Dave Clark; 30 Midre Cummings; 11 Mike Kingery; 28 Al Martin; 6 Orlando Merced; 12 John Wehner; 51 Tony Womack	Manager: 10 Jim Leyland; Coaches: 45 Rich Donnelly (bench); 23 Gene Lamont (third base); 39 Milt May (hitting); 31 Ray Miller (pitching); 37 Tommy Sandt (first base); 54 Spin Williams (bullpen)

=== Opening Day lineup ===
Opening Day Starters
#	Name	Position
11	Mike Kingery	CF
28	Al Martin	LF
22	Orlando Merced	RF
7	Jeff King	1B
17	Charlie Hayes	3B
3	Jay Bell	SS
6	John DeSalvo	2B
18	Jason Kendall	C
43	Paul Wagner	SP

== Player stats ==
Batting

Note: G = Games played; AB = At bats; H = Hits; Avg. = Batting average; HR = Home runs; RBI = Runs batted in

Regular season
Player	G	AB	H	Avg.	HR	RBI
J. DeSalvo	15	5	2	0.400	0	2
D. Sveum	12	34	12	0.353	1	5
D. May	5	3	1	0.333	0	0
T. Womack	17	30	10	0.333	0	7
A. Encarnación	7	22	7	0.318	0	1
A. Martin	155	630	189	0.300	18	72
J. Kendall	130	414	124	0.300	3	42
K. Osik	48	140	41	0.293	1	14
O. Merced	120	453	130	0.287	17	80
C. García	101	390	111	0.285	6	44
D. Clark	92	211	58	0.275	8	35
M. Johnson	127	343	94	0.274	13	47
J. King	155	591	160	0.271	30	111
N. Liriano	112	217	58	0.267	3	30
J. Allensworth	61	229	60	0.262	4	31
J. Wehner	86	139	36	0.259	2	13
J. Bell	151	527	132	0.250	13	71
R. Aude	7	16	4	0.250	0	1
J. Brumfield	29	80	20	0.250	2	8
R. Loiselle	5	8	2	0.250	0	2
C. Hayes	128	459	114	0.248	10	62
M. Kingery	117	276	68	0.246	3	27
M. Ruebel	26	13	3	0.231	0	0
M. Cummings	24	85	19	0.224	3	7
M. Wilkins	47	9	2	0.222	0	1
T. Beamon	24	51	11	0.216	0	6
C. Peters	16	19	4	0.211	0	1
D. Darwin	19	39	8	0.205	1	3
J. Hope	5	5	1	0.200	0	0
J. Lieber	51	36	7	0.194	0	3
D. Neagle	30	55	10	0.182	0	2
S. Parris	8	6	1	0.167	0	0
Z. Smith	16	26	4	0.154	0	3
F. Córdova	59	16	2	0.125	0	2
E. Loaiza	11	17	2	0.118	0	1
J. Schmidt	6	12	1	0.083	0	2
P. Wagner	17	25	1	0.040	0	2
J. Boever	13	1	0	0.000	0	0
J. Christiansen	33	4	0	0.000	0	0
S. Cooke	3	1	0	0.000	0	0
J. Ericks	28	5	0	0.000	0	0
D. Miceli	44	13	0	0.000	0	0
R. Morel	29	4	0	0.000	0	0
D. Plesac	73	5	0	0.000	0	0
D. Wainhouse	17	1	0	0.000	0	0
L. Hancock	13	0	0	—	0	0
Team totals	162	5,665	1,509	0.266	138	738

Pitching

Note: G = Games pitched; IP = Innings pitched; W = Wins; L = Losses; ERA = Earned run average; SO = Strikeouts

Regular season
Player	G	IP	W	L	ERA	SO
D. Darwin	19	122 1/3	7	9	3.02	69
R. Loiselle	5	20 2/3	1	0	3.05	9
D. Neagle	27	182 2/3	14	6	3.05	131
M. Wilkins	47	75	4	3	3.84	62
J. Lieber	51	142	9	5	3.99	94
J. Schmidt	6	37 2/3	2	2	4.06	26
F. Córdova	59	99	4	7	4.09	95
D. Plesac	73	70 1/3	6	5	4.09	76
M. Ruebel	26	58 2/3	1	1	4.60	22
E. Loaiza	10	52 2/3	2	3	4.96	32
Z. Smith	16	83 1/3	4	6	5.08	47
R. Morel	29	42	2	1	5.36	22
J. Boever	13	15	0	2	5.40	6
P. Wagner	16	81 2/3	4	8	5.40	81
C. Peters	16	64	2	4	5.63	28
D. Wainhouse	17	23 2/3	1	0	5.70	16
D. Miceli	44	85 2/3	2	10	5.78	66
J. Ericks	28	46 2/3	4	5	5.79	46
L. Hancock	13	18 1/3	0	0	6.38	13
J. Christiansen	33	44 1/3	3	3	6.70	38
J. Hope	5	19 1/3	1	3	6.98	13
S. Parris	8	26 1/3	0	3	7.18	27
S. Cooke	3	8 1/3	0	0	7.56	7
E. Dessens	15	25	0	2	8.28	13
D. May	5	8 2/3	0	1	9.35	5
Team totals	162	1,453 1/3	73	89	4.61	1,044

== Awards and honors ==
1996 Major League Baseball All-Star Game

- Jason Kendall, C, reserve

== Transactions ==
- April 27, 1996: Joe Boever was selected off waivers by the Pirates from the Detroit Tigers.
- May 15, 1996: Jacob Brumfield was traded by the Pirates to the Toronto Blue Jays for D. J. Boston (minors).
- June 4, 1996: Kris Benson was drafted by the Pirates in the 1st round (1st pick). Player signed August 11, 1996.
- July 6, 1996: Zane Smith was released by the Pirates.
- July 23, 1996: Danny Darwin was traded by the Pirates to the Houston Astros for Rich Loiselle.
- August 28, 1996: Denny Neagle was traded by the Pirates to the Atlanta Braves for Ron Wright, Corey Pointer (minors) and a player to be named later. The Braves completed the deal by sending Jason Schmidt to the Pirates on August 30.
- August 30, 1996: Charlie Hayes was traded by the Pirates to the New York Yankees for a player to be named later. The Yankees completed the deal by sending Chris Corn (minors) to the Pirates on August 31.

== Farm system ==
Level	Team	League	Manager
AAA	Calgary Cannons	Pacific Coast League	Trent Jewett
AA	Carolina Mudcats	Southern League	Marc Hill
A	Lynchburg Hillcats	Carolina League	Jeff Banister
A	Augusta Greenjackets	South Atlantic League	Jay Loviglio
A-Short Season	Erie SeaWolves	New York–Penn League	Jeff Richardson
Rookie	GCL Pirates	Gulf Coast League	Woody Huyke
