= 1996 Florida Marlins season =

1996 Florida Marlins
- League: National League
- Division: East
- Ballpark: Joe Robbie Stadium
- City: Miami Gardens, Florida
- Record: 80–82 (.494)
- Divisional place: 3rd
- Owners: Wayne Huizenga
- General managers: Dave Dombrowski
- Managers: Rene Lachemann, Cookie Rojas, John Boles
- Television: Sunshine Network; WBFS-TV (Gary Carter, Jay Randolph)
- Radio: WQAM (Joe Angel, Dave O'Brien); WCMQ-FM (Spanish) (Felo Ramírez, Manolo Alvarez)

The 1996 Florida Marlins season was the fourth season for the Major League Baseball (MLB) franchise in the National League. It would begin with the team attempting to improve on their season from 1995. Their managers were Rene Lachemann, Cookie Rojas, and John Boles. They played home games in Miami Gardens, Florida. They finished with a record of 80 wins and 82 losses, third place in the National League East.

The Marlins home ballpark at the time had been known as Joe Robbie Stadium since its opening. However, in the middle of the 1996 season, the Miami Dolphins, who controlled the stadium, sold naming rights to Pro Player by Fruit of the Loom.

Thus, in the middle of the Marlins season on August 26, Joe Robbie Stadium was renamed Pro Player Park. On September 10, after the Dolphins home opener and still before the end of baseball season, the park was renamed Pro Player Stadium, a name which remained though the 2004 season.

== Offseason ==
- October 8, 1995: Scott Podsednik was sent by the Texas Rangers to the Florida Marlins to complete an earlier deal made on August 8, 1995. The Texas Rangers sent players to be named later to the Florida Marlins for Bobby Witt. The Texas Rangers sent Wilson Heredia (August 11, 1995) and Scott Podsednik (October 8, 1995) to the Florida Marlins to complete the trade.
- November 21, 1995: Devon White signed as a free agent with the Florida Marlins.
- December 13, 1995: Mark Davis was signed as a free agent with the Florida Marlins.
- December 22, 1995: Craig Grebeck was signed as a free agent with the Florida Marlins.
- January 5, 1996: Andre Dawson was signed as a free agent with the Florida Marlins.
- January 23, 1996: Aaron Small was selected off waivers by the Seattle Mariners from the Florida Marlins.
- March 23, 1996: Mark Davis was released by the Florida Marlins.

== Regular season ==
- On May 11, 1996, Al Leiter threw the first no-hitter in Florida Marlins history. The Marlins beat the Rockies by a score of 11–0.

=== Season standings ===
NL East
| Team | W | L | Pct. | GB | Home | Road |
|---|---|---|---|---|---|---|
| Atlanta Braves | 96 | 66 | .593 | — | 56‍–‍25 | 40‍–‍41 |
| Montreal Expos | 88 | 74 | .543 | 8 | 50‍–‍31 | 38‍–‍43 |
| Florida Marlins | 80 | 82 | .494 | 16 | 52‍–‍29 | 28‍–‍53 |
| New York Mets | 71 | 91 | .438 | 25 | 42‍–‍39 | 29‍–‍52 |
| Philadelphia Phillies | 67 | 95 | .414 | 29 | 35‍–‍46 | 32‍–‍49 |

=== Record vs. opponents ===
1996 National League record Source: MLB Standings Grid – 1996
| Team | ATL | CHC | CIN | COL | FLA | HOU | LAD | MON | NYM | PHI | PIT | SD | SF | STL |
|---|---|---|---|---|---|---|---|---|---|---|---|---|---|---|
| Atlanta | — | 7–5 | 7–5 | 5–7 | 6–7 | 6–6 | 5–7 | 10–3 | 7–6 | 9–4 | 9–3 | 9–4 | 7–5 | 9–4 |
| Chicago | 5–7 | — | 5–8 | 5–7 | 6–6 | 5–8 | 8–5 | 6–6 | 7–5 | 7–6 | 4–9 | 6–6 | 7–5 | 5–8 |
| Cincinnati | 5–7 | 8–5 | — | 7–6 | 3–9 | 7–6 | 4–8 | 3–9 | 6–6 | 10–2 | 5–8 | 9–3 | 9–4 | 5–8 |
| Colorado | 7–5 | 7–5 | 6–7 | — | 5–8 | 8–5 | 6–7 | 3–9 | 7–5 | 6–6 | 7–5 | 8–5 | 5–8 | 8–4 |
| Florida | 7–6 | 6–6 | 9–3 | 8–5 | — | 7–5 | 6–7 | 5–8 | 7–6 | 6–7 | 5–7 | 3–9 | 5–7 | 6–6 |
| Houston | 6–6 | 8–5 | 6–7 | 5–8 | 5–7 | — | 6–6 | 4–9 | 8–4 | 10–2 | 8–5 | 6–6 | 8–4 | 2–11 |
| Los Angeles | 7–5 | 5–8 | 8–4 | 7–6 | 7–6 | 6–6 | — | 9–3 | 8–4 | 7–6 | 6–6 | 5–8 | 7–6 | 8–4 |
| Montreal | 3–10 | 6–6 | 9–3 | 9–3 | 8–5 | 9–4 | 3–9 | — | 7–6 | 6–7 | 7–5 | 4–8 | 9–4 | 8–4 |
| New York | 6–7 | 5–7 | 6–6 | 5–7 | 6–7 | 4–8 | 4–8 | 6–7 | — | 7–6 | 8–5 | 3–10 | 6–6 | 5–7 |
| Philadelphia | 4–9 | 6–7 | 2–10 | 6–6 | 7–6 | 2–10 | 6–7 | 7–6 | 6–7 | — | 7–5 | 4–8 | 6–6 | 4–8 |
| Pittsburgh | 3–9 | 9–4 | 8–5 | 5–7 | 7–5 | 5–8 | 6–6 | 5–7 | 5–8 | 5–7 | — | 4–9 | 8–4 | 3–10 |
| San Diego | 4–9 | 6–6 | 3–9 | 5–8 | 9–3 | 6–6 | 8–5 | 8–4 | 10–3 | 8–4 | 9–4 | — | 11–2 | 4–8 |
| San Francisco | 5–7 | 5–7 | 4–9 | 8–5 | 7–5 | 4–8 | 6–7 | 4–9 | 6–6 | 6–6 | 4–8 | 2–11 | — | 7–6 |
| St. Louis | 4–9 | 8–5 | 8–5 | 4–8 | 6–6 | 11–2 | 4–8 | 4–8 | 7–5 | 8–4 | 10–3 | 8–4 | 6–7 | — |

=== Game log ===
1996 Game Log: 80–82 (Home: 52–29; Away: 28–53)
April: 11–16 (Home: 6–6; Away: 5–10)

| # | Date | Opponent | Score | Win | Loss | Save | Attendance | Record |
|---|---|---|---|---|---|---|---|---|
| 1 | April 1 | Pirates | 0–4 | Wagner | **Brown** (0–1) | — | 41,815 | 0–1 |
| 2 | April 2 | Pirates | 1–4 | Christiansen | **Pena** (0–1) | Miceli | 20,243 | 0–2 |
| 3 | April 4 | Pirates | 6–2 | **Leiter** (1–0) | Ericks | — | 19,008 | 1–2 |
| 4 | April 5 | Giants | 1–7 | Fernandez | **Rapp** (0–1) | — | 24,769 | 1–3 |
| 5 | April 6 | Giants | 1–0 (10) | **Nen** (1–0) | Dewey | — | 34,002 | 2–3 |
| 6 | April 7 | Giants | 7–14 | Bourgeois | **Burkett** (0–1) | — | 19,842 | 2–4 |
| 7 | April 8 | @ Padres | 2–9 | Hamilton | **Hammond** (0–1) | — | 44,470 | 2–5 |
| 8 | April 9 | @ Padres | 5–2 (10) | **Leiter** (2–0) | Blair | — | 15,160 | 3–5 |
| 9 | April 10 | @ Padres | 0–3 | Tewksbury | **Rapp** (0–2) | Hoffman | 10,510 | 3–6 |
| 10 | April 11 | @ Dodgers | 0–5 | Park | **Brown** (0–2) | Worrell | 36,023 | 3–7 |
| 11 | April 12 | @ Dodgers | 3–1 | **Burkett** (1–1) | Valdez | — | 40,343 | 4–7 |
| 12 | April 13 | @ Dodgers | 1–3 | Nomo | **Hammond** (0–2) | — | 46,059 | 4–8 |
| 13 | April 14 | @ Dodgers | 1–6 | Astacio | **Leiter** (2–1) | — | 49,728 | 4–9 |
| 14 | April 16 | @ Braves | 2–5 | Avery | **Brown** (0–3) | Wohlers | 26,625 | 4–10 |
| 15 | April 17 | @ Braves | 2–4 | Maddux | **Burkett** (1–2) | Wohlers | 28,884 | 4–11 |
| 16 | April 18 | @ Braves | 5–3 | **Hammond** (1–2) | Glavine | **Nen** (1) | 25,300 | 5–11 |
| 17 | April 19 | Dodgers | 5–0 | **Powell** (1–0) | Hall | — | 24,143 | 6–11 |
| 18 | April 20 | Dodgers | 7–4 | **Leiter** (3–1) | Nomo | **Nen** (2) | 35,542 | 7–11 |
| 19 | April 21 | Dodgers | 5–4 | **Brown** (1–3) | Hall | **Mathews** (1) | 23,842 | 8–11 |
| 20 | April 22 | Padres | 3–5 | Ashby | **Burkett** (1–3) | — | 17,473 | 8–12 |
| 21 | April 23 | Padres | 2–7 | Bergman | **Hammond** (1–3) | — | 19,667 | 8–13 |
| 22 | April 24 | @ Pirates | 3–6 | Neagle | **Rapp** (0–3) | — | 9,812 | 8–14 |
| 23 | April 25 | @ Pirates | 4–1 | **Leiter** (4–1) | Hope | **Nen** (3) | 8,315 | 9–14 |
| 24 | April 26 | @ Giants | 3–0 | **Brown** (2–3) | Fernandez | — | 12,461 | 10–14 |
| 25 | April 27 | @ Giants | 3–6 | Leiter | **Burkett** (1–4) | Beck | 15,711 | 10–15 |
| 26 | April 28 | @ Giants | 4–10 | VanLandingham | **Hammond** (1–4) | — | 23,535 | 10–16 |
| 27 | April 30 | Phillies | 7–2 | **Rapp** (1–3) | Williams | **Nen** (4) | 15,252 | 11–16 |

May: 16–11 (Home: 12–6; Away: 4–5)

| # | Date | Opponent | Score | Win | Loss | Save | Attendance | Record |
|---|---|---|---|---|---|---|---|---|
| 28 | May 1 | Phillies | 5–6 | Ryan | **Leiter** (4–2) | Bottalico | 14,672 | 11–17 |
| 29 | May 2 | Phillies | 0–2 | Grace | **Brown** (2–4) | Bottalico | 14,888 | 11–18 |
| 30 | May 3 | @ Rockies | 5–9 | Reynoso | **Burkett** (1–5) | — | 48,129 | 11–19 |
| 31 | May 4 | @ Rockies | 5–17 | Freeman | **Hammond** (1–5) | — | 48,101 | 11–20 |
| 32 | May 5 | @ Rockies | 4–5 | Ritz | **Perez** (0–1) | — | 48,134 | 11–21 |
| 33 | May 6 | Mets | 4–1 | **Leiter** (5–2) | Clark | **Nen** (5) | 16,819 | 12–21 |
| 34 | May 7 | Mets | 3–2 | **Hammond** (2–5) | Isringhausen | **Nen** (6) | 20,127 | 13–21 |
| 35 | May 8 | Mets | 6–3 | **Perez** (1–1) | Henry | **Nen** (7) | 21,357 | 14–21 |
| 36 | May 9 | Rockies | 6–2 | **Miller** (1–0) | Freeman | — | 21,008 | 15–21 |
| 37 | May 10 | Rockies | 4–2 | **Rapp** (2–3) | Ritz | **Nen** (8) | 27,309 | 16–21 |
| 38 | May 11 | Rockies | 11–0 | **Leiter** (6–2) | Thompson | — | 31,549 | 17–21 |
| 39 | May 12 | Rockies | 7–5 | **Nen** (2–0) | Leskanic | — | 21,058 | 18–21 |
| 40 | May 13 | Cardinals | 5–2 | **Burkett** (2–5) | Benes | **Powell** (1) | 19,227 | 19–21 |
| 41 | May 14 | Cardinals | 11–5 | **Mathews** (1–0) | Parrett | — | 16,070 | 20–21 |
| 42 | May 15 | Cardinals | 0–6 | Stottlemyre | **Rapp** (2–4) | — | 18,066 | 20–22 |
| 43 | May 17 | @ Cubs | 1–3 | Bullinger | **Leiter** (6–3) | Wendell | 32,528 | 20–23 |
| 44 | May 18 | @ Cubs | 3–2 | **Burkett** (3–5) | Trachsel | **Nen** (9) | 38,003 | 21–23 |
| 45 | May 19 | @ Cubs | 8–7 (11) | **Mantei** (1–0) | Wendell | **Nen** (10) | 30,420 | 22–23 |
| 46 | May 20 | @ Reds | 5–3 | **Rapp** (3–4) | Burba | **Nen** (11) | 18,023 | 23–23 |
| 47 | May 21 | @ Reds | 3–2 | **Weathers** (1–0) | Salkeld | **Mathews** (2) | 19,534 | 24–23 |
| 48 | May 22 | @ Reds | 1–4 | Smiley | **Leiter** (6–4) | Brantley | 22,055 | 24–24 |
| 49 | May 24 | Cardinals | 2–4 | Morgan | **Burkett** (3–6) | Mathews | 19,583 | 24–25 |
| 50 | May 25 | Cardinals | 0–5 | Benes | **Rapp** (3–5) | — | 26,312 | 24–26 |
| 51 | May 26 | Cardinals | 8–2 (7) | **Weathers** (2–0) | Osborne | — | 20,573 | 25–26 |
| 52 | May 27 | Reds | 6–2 | **Leiter** (7–4) | Smiley | — | 15,919 | 26–26 |
| 53 | May 28 | Reds | 6–2 | **Brown** (3–4) | Burba | **Mathews** (4) | 14,052 | 27–26 |
| 54 | May 31 | Cubs | 1–2 | Navarro | **Rapp** (3–6) | — | 19,552 | 27–27 |

June: 12–14 (Home: 8–5; Away: 4–9)

| # | Date | Opponent | Score | Win | Loss | Save | Attendance | Record |
|---|---|---|---|---|---|---|---|---|
| 55 | June 1 | Cubs | 4–5 (10) | Wendell | **Mathews** (1–1) | — | 30,133 | 27–28 |
| 56 | June 2 | Cubs | 3–2 | **Brown** (4–4) | Telemaco | **Nen** (12) | 22,174 | 28–28 |
| 57 | June 4 | Expos | 5–0 | **Burkett** (4–6) | Rueter | — | 14,821 | 29–28 |
| 58 | June 5 | Expos | 1–2 | Cormier | **Rapp** (3–7) | Veres | 21,342 | 29–29 |
| 59 | June 7 | @ Mets | 12–2 | **Leiter** (8–4) | Harnisch | — | 13,009 | 30–29 |
| 60 | June 8 | @ Mets | 6–7 | Clark | **Weathers** (2–1) | Franco | 22,550 | 30–30 |
| 61 | June 9 | @ Mets | 0–3 | Isringhausen | **Burkett** (4–7) | — | 40,707 | 30–31 |
| 62 | June 10 | @ Expos | 5–2 | **Nen** (3–0) | Dyer | — | 34,867 | 31–31 |
| 63 | June 11 | @ Expos | 2–3 | Scott | **Brown** (4–5) | Veres | 10,758 | 31–32 |
| 64 | June 12 | @ Expos | 0–8 | Fassero | **Leiter** (8–5) | — | 12,341 | 31–33 |
| 65 | June 13 | @ Pirates | 4–3 | **Perez** (2–1) | Cordova | **Nen** (13) | 15,083 | 32–33 |
| 66 | June 14 | @ Pirates | 4–5 | Plesac | **Nen** (3–1) | — | 26,494 | 32–34 |
| 67 | June 15 | @ Pirates | 8–12 | Darwin | **Rapp** (3–8) | — | 15,596 | 32–35 |
| 68 | June 16 | @ Pirates | 4–2 | **Brown** (5–5) | Neagle | **Nen** (14) | 28,120 | 33–35 |
| 69 | June 17 | @ Giants | 0–1 | Fernandez | **Leiter** (8–6) | Beck | 9,524 | 33–36 |
| 70 | June 18 | @ Giants | 8–9 (15) | Juden | **Rapp** (3–9) | — | 15,439 | 33–37 |
| 71 | June 19 | @ Giants | 4–7 (15) | Bautista | **Mathews** (1–2) | — | 13,274 | 33–38 |
| 72 | June 21 | Pirates | 4–0 | **Brown** (6–5) | Darwin | — | 20,442 | 34–38 |
| 73 | June 22 | Pirates | 1–4 (10) | Plesac | **Perez** (2–2) | — | 26,666 | 34–39 |
| 74 | June 23 | Pirates | 3–5 | Lieber | **Rapp** (3–10) | Cordova | 20,769 | 34–40 |
| 75 | June 24 | Giants | 2–1 | **Burkett** (5–7) | Leiter | **Nen** (15) | 16,860 | 35–40 |
| 76 | June 25 | Giants | 5–4 (10) | **Powell** (2–0) | Beck | — | 16,577 | 36–40 |
| 77 | June 26 | Giants | 3–2 | **Brown** (7–5) | Watson | — | 21,188 | 37–40 |
| 78 | June 28 | Braves | 2–0 | **Leiter** (9–6) | Glavine | **Nen** (16) | 30,661 | 38–40 |
| 79 | June 29 | Braves | 5–3 | **Rapp** (4–10) | Smoltz | — | 40,952 | 39–40 |
| 80 | June 30 | Braves | 4–5 | Clontz | **Burkett** (5–8) | Wohlers | 34,023 | 39–41 |

July: 10–17 (Home: 8–6; Away: 2–11)

| # | Date | Opponent | Score | Win | Loss | Save | Attendance | Record |
|---|---|---|---|---|---|---|---|---|
| 81 | July 1 | @ Astros | 2–6 | Hampton | **Brown** (7–6) | — | 18,513 | 39–42 |
| 82 | July 2 | @ Astros | 3–4 (12) | Johnstone | **Mathews** (1–3) | — | 18,897 | 39–43 |
| 83 | July 3 | @ Astros | 3–4 | Drabek | **Leiter** (9–7) | Jones | 24,537 | 39–44 |
| 84 | July 4 | @ Phillies | 5–8 | Blazier | **Rapp** (4–11) | Bottalico | 17,460 | 39–45 |
| 85 | July 5 | @ Phillies | 4–7 | Borland | **Miller** (1–1) | Bottalico | 46,872 | 39–46 |
| 86 | July 6 | @ Phillies | 1–2 | Williams | **Brown** (7–7) | Bottalico | 22,278 | 39–47 |
| 87 | July 7 | @ Phillies | 7–4 (10) | **Mathews** (2–3) | Jordan | **Nen** (17) | 28,183 | 40–47 |
| 88 | July 11 | @ Braves | 9–8 | **Burkett** (6–8) | Avery | **Nen** (18) | 33,208 | 41–47 |
| 89 | July 12 | @ Braves | 3–6 | Glavine | **Leiter** (9–8) | Wohlers | 32,517 | 41–48 |
| 90 | July 13 | @ Braves | 0–3 | Smoltz | **Brown** (7–8) | — | 36,953 | 41–49 |
| 91 | July 14 | @ Braves | 10–15 | McMichael | **Perez** (2–3) | — | 31,134 | 41–50 |
| 92 | July 15 | Astros | 15–5 | **Pall** (1–0) | Wall | — | 15,807 | 42–50 |
| 93 | July 16 | Astros | 3–2 | **Perez** (3–3) | Jones | — | 15,610 | 43–50 |
| 94 | July 17 | Astros | 11–2 | **Leiter** (10–8) | Reynolds | — | 16,345 | 44–50 |
| 95 | July 18 | Phillies | 7–0 | **Brown** (8–8) | Mimbs | — | 16,521 | 45–50 |
| 96 | July 19 | Phillies | 11–2 | **Hammond** (3–5) | Williams | — | 19,123 | 46–50 |
| 97 | July 20 | Phillies | 7–4 | **Rapp** (5–11) | Springer | **Nen** (19) | 24,336 | 47–50 |
| 98 | July 21 | Phillies | 3–12 | Schilling | **Burkett** (6–9) | Bottalico | 20,873 | 47–51 |
| 99 | July 23 | Dodgers | 1–7 | Valdez | **Leiter** (10–9) | — | 17,889 | 47–52 |
| 100 | July 24 | Dodgers | 3–0 | **Brown** (9–8) | Nomo | **Nen** (20) | 20,486 | 48–52 |
| 101 | July 25 | Dodgers | 3–6 | Astacio | **Hammond** (3–6) | Worrell | 18,151 | 48–53 |
| 102 | July 26 | Padres | 0–3 (11) | Hoffman | **Pall** (1–1) | — | 19,677 | 48–54 |
| 103 | July 27 | Padres | 12–20 | Villone | **Mathews** (2–4) | — | 26,182 | 48–55 |
| 104 | July 28 | Padres | 8–2 | **Leiter** (11–9) | Hamilton | — | 22,683 | 49–55 |
| 105 | July 29 | Padres | 3–5 | Sanders | **Brown** (9–9) | Hoffman | 18,281 | 49–56 |
| 106 | July 30 | @ Dodgers | 4–5 (10) | Osuna | **Weathers** (2–2) | — | 34,973 | 49–57 |
| 107 | July 31 | @ Dodgers | 0–3 | Martinez | **Rapp** (5–12) | Worrell | 29,565 | 49–58 |

August: 16–13 (Home: 8–3; Away: 8–10)

| # | Date | Opponent | Score | Win | Loss | Save | Attendance | Record |
|---|---|---|---|---|---|---|---|---|
| 108 | August 1 | @ Dodgers | 7–6 (14) | **Hammond** (4–6) | Dreifort | **Mathews** (5) | 41,197 | 50–58 |
| 109 | August 2 | @ Padres | 1–2 | Hoffman | **Perez** (3–4) | — | 18,239 | 50–59 |
| 110 | August 3 | @ Padres | 5–2 | **Brown** (10–9) | Sanders | **Nen** (21) | 55,412 | 51–59 |
| 111 | August 4 | @ Padres | 4–6 | Valenzuela | **Hammond** (4–7) | Hoffman | 35,302 | 51–60 |
| 112 | August 5 | @ Rockies | 16–9 | **Hutton** (1–0) | Freeman | — | 48,313 | 52–60 |
| 113 | August 6 | @ Rockies | 0–11 | Thompson | **Burkett** (6–10) | — | 48,339 | 52–61 |
| 114 | August 7 | @ Rockies | 5–12 | Ritz | **Leiter** (11–10) | — | 48,622 | 52–62 |
| 115 | August 8 | Mets | 0–3 | Harnisch | **Brown** (10–10) | Franco | 21,627 | 52–63 |
| 116 | August 9 | Mets | 2–1 (10) | **Nen** (4–1) | Henry | — | 21,506 | 53–63 |
| 117 | August 10 | Mets | 9–6 | **Rapp** (6–12) | Wilson | **Nen** (22) | 22,115 | 54–63 |
| 118 | August 11 | Mets | 3–5 | Clark | **Valdes** (0–1) | Franco | 21,092 | 54–64 |
| 119 | August 13 | Rockies | 5–0 | **Leiter** (12–10) | Ritz | — | 26,256 | 55–64 |
| 120 | August 14 | Rockies | 2–1 | **Brown** (11–10) | Leskanic | **Nen** (23) | 26,589 | 56–64 |
| 121 | August 15 | Rockies | 7–6 | **Powell** (3–0) | Ruffin | **Nen** (24) | 21,723 | 57–64 |
| 122 | August 16 | @ Cardinals | 2–6 | Benes | **Rapp** (6–13) | — | 30,507 | 57–65 |
| 123 | August 17 | @ Cardinals | 3–4 | Mathews | **Powell** (3–1) | Eckersley | 30,792 | 57–66 |
| 124 | August 18 | @ Cardinals | 3–5 | Stottlemyre | **Leiter** (12–11) | Eckersley | 34,564 | 57–67 |
| 125 | August 19 | @ Cubs | 4–3 | **Brown** (12–10) | Telemaco | **Nen** (25) | 32,302 | 58–67 |
| 126 | August 20 | @ Cubs | 1–8 | Foster | **Hutton** (1–1) | — | 22,119 | 58–68 |
| 127 | August 21 | @ Cubs | 3–8 | Castillo | **Rapp** (6–14) | — | 27,699 | 58–69 |
| 128 | August 23 | Reds | 5–6 | Carrara | **Valdes** (0–2) | Brantley | — | 58–70 |
| 129 | August 23 | Reds | 8–3 | **Leiter** (13–11) | Jarvis | — | 21,497 | 59–70 |
| 130 | August 24 | Reds | 5–3 | **Brown** (13–10) | Burba | **Nen** (26) | 33,883 | 60–70 |
| 131 | August 25 | Reds | 6–5 | **Nen** (5–1) | Smith | — | 27,372 | 61–70 |
| 132 | August 27 | @ Cardinals | 6–3 | **Hutton** (2–1) | Morgan | **Nen** (27) | 24,784 | 62–70 |
| 133 | August 28 | @ Cardinals | 3–2 (10) | **Hammond** (5–7) | Bailey | **Nen** (28) | 21,767 | 63–70 |
| 134 | August 29 | @ Cardinals | 10–9 | **Leiter** (14–11) | Stottlemyre | **Nen** (29) | 23,105 | 64–70 |
| 135 | August 30 | @ Reds | 3–1 | **Brown** (14–10) | Remlinger | — | 22,485 | 65–70 |
| 136 | August 31 | @ Reds | 8–22 | Jarvis | **Miller** (1–2) | — | 25,196 | 65–71 |

September: 15–11 (Home: 10–3; Away: 5–8)

| # | Date | Opponent | Score | Win | Loss | Save | Attendance | Record |
|---|---|---|---|---|---|---|---|---|
| 137 | September 1 | @ Reds | 6–1 | **Hutton** (3–1) | Smiley | — | 25,521 | 66–71 |
| 138 | September 2 | Cubs | 4–3 | **Valdes** (1–2) | Trachsel | **Nen** (30) | 16,622 | 67–71 |
| 139 | September 3 | Cubs | 3–11 | Navarro | **Leiter** (14–12) | — | 15,528 | 67–72 |
| 140 | September 4 | Cubs | 9–2 | **Brown** (15–10) | Foster | — | 14,879 | 68–72 |
| 141 | September 5 | Expos | 2–6 | Manuel | **Rapp** (6–15) | — | 16,080 | 68–73 |
| 142 | September 6 | Expos | 4–0 | **Hutton** (4–1) | Fassero | **Powell** (2) | 16,943 | 69–73 |
| 143 | September 7 | Expos | 1–2 | Leiter | **Valdes** (1–3) | Rojas | 25,278 | 69–74 |
| 144 | September 8 | Expos | 2–1 | **Helling** (1–0) | Martinez | **Nen** (31) | 19,427 | 70–74 |
| 145 | September 9 | @ Mets | 1–6 | Mlicki | **Brown** (15–11) | — | 14,100 | 70–75 |
| 146 | September 10 | @ Mets | 9–3 (12) | **Powell** (4–1) | Henry | — | 14,746 | 71–75 |
| 147 | September 11 | @ Mets | 1–3 | Isringhausen | **Rapp** (6–16) | Wallace | 12,448 | 71–76 |
| 148 | September 12 | @ Expos | 4–5 | Veres | **Powell** (4–2) | Rojas | 9,308 | 71–77 |
| 149 | September 13 | @ Expos | 2–3 | Martinez | **Helling** (1–1) | Rojas | 13,723 | 71–78 |
| 150 | September 14 | @ Expos | 2–3 | Veres | **Powell** (4–3) | Rojas | 17,546 | 71–79 |
| 151 | September 15 | @ Expos | 4–3 | **Leiter** (15–12) | Daal | **Nen** (32) | 26,166 | 72–79 |
| 152 | September 17 | @ Phillies | 11–5 | **Rapp** (7–16) | Beech | — | 15,507 | 73–79 |
| 153 | September 18 | @ Phillies | 6–8 | Borland | **Miller** (1–3) | Bottalico | 17,158 | 73–80 |
| 154 | September 20 | Astros | 3–1 | **Brown** (16–11) | Reynolds | **Nen** (33) | 21,518 | 74–80 |
| 155 | September 21 | Astros | 2–1 | **Heredia** (1–0) | Wagner | — | 31,023 | 75–80 |
| 156 | September 22 | Astros | 6–0 | **Helling** (2–1) | Kile | — | 17,461 | 76–80 |
| 157 | September 24 | Braves | 12–1 | **Rapp** (8–16) | Avery | — | 18,245 | 77–80 |
| 158 | September 25 | Braves | 3–0 | **Brown** (17–11) | Glavine | **Nen** (34) | 29,178 | 78–80 |
| 159 | September 26 | Braves | 7–1 | **Leiter** (16–12) | Neagle | — | 25,553 | 79–80 |
| 160 | September 27 | @ Astros | 3–2 | **Hutton** (5–1) | Kile | **Nen** (35) | 21,725 | 80–80 |
| 161 | September 28 | @ Astros | 1–5 | Darwin | **Heredia** (1–1) | — | 21,832 | 80–81 |
| 162 | September 29 | @ Astros | 4–5 (10) | Hudek | **Hammond** (5–8) | — | 42,658 | 80–82 |

Legend: = Win = Loss
Bold = Marlins team member

=== Detailed records ===
National League
| Opponent | W | L | WP | RS | RA |
NL East
| Atlanta Braves | 7 | 6 | 0.538 | 64 | 54 |
| **Florida Marlins** | | | | | |
| Montreal Expos | 5 | 8 | 0.385 | 34 | 38 |
| New York Mets | 7 | 6 | 0.538 | 56 | 45 |
| Philadelphia Phillies | 6 | 7 | 0.462 | 74 | 62 |
| Total | 25 | 27 | 0.481 | 228 | 199 |
NL Central
| Chicago Cubs | 6 | 6 | 0.500 | 44 | 56 |
| Cincinnati Reds | 9 | 3 | 0.750 | 62 | 54 |
| Houston Astros | 7 | 5 | 0.583 | 56 | 37 |
| Pittsburgh Pirates | 5 | 7 | 0.417 | 42 | 48 |
| St. Louis Cardinals | 6 | 6 | 0.500 | 53 | 53 |
| Total | 33 | 27 | 0.550 | 257 | 248 |
NL West
| Colorado Rockies | 8 | 5 | 0.615 | 77 | 79 |
| Los Angeles Dodgers | 6 | 7 | 0.462 | 40 | 50 |
| San Diego Padres | 3 | 9 | 0.250 | 45 | 66 |
| San Francisco Giants | 5 | 7 | 0.417 | 41 | 61 |
| Total | 22 | 28 | 0.440 | 203 | 256 |
| Season Total | 80 | 82 | 0.494 | 688 | 703 |

| Month | Games | Won | Lost | Win % | RS | RA |
|---|---|---|---|---|---|---|
| April | 27 | 11 | 16 | 0.407 | 83 | 117 |
| May | 27 | 16 | 11 | 0.593 | 120 | 105 |
| June | 26 | 12 | 14 | 0.462 | 99 | 97 |
| July | 27 | 10 | 17 | 0.370 | 138 | 145 |
| August | 29 | 16 | 13 | 0.552 | 136 | 158 |
| September | 26 | 15 | 11 | 0.577 | 112 | 81 |
| Total | 162 | 80 | 82 | 0.494 | 688 | 703 |

| | Games | Won | Lost | Win % | RS | RA |
| Home | 81 | 52 | 29 | 0.642 | 369 | 277 |
| Away | 81 | 28 | 53 | 0.346 | 319 | 426 |
| Total | 162 | 80 | 82 | 0.494 | 688 | 703 |

=== Transactions ===
- June 4, 1996: Mark Kotsay was drafted by the Florida Marlins in the 1st round (9th pick) of the 1996 amateur draft. Player signed August 15, 1996.
- July 31, 1996: Dave Weathers was traded by the Florida Marlins to the New York Yankees for Mark Hutton.
- August 13, 1996: Terry Pendleton was traded by the Florida Marlins to the Atlanta Braves for Roosevelt Brown.
- August 23, 1996: Gregg Zaun was sent by the Baltimore Orioles to the Florida Marlins to complete an earlier deal made on August 21, 1996. The Baltimore Orioles sent a player to be named later to the Florida Marlins for Terry Mathews. The Baltimore Orioles sent Gregg Zaun (August 23, 1996) to the Florida Marlins to complete the trade.

=== Roster ===
1996 Florida Marlins
**Roster**
| **Pitchers**: 56 Joel Adamson; 43 Miguel Batista; 27 Kevin Brown; 33 John Burkett; 11 Chris Hammond; 33 Rick Helling; 24 Félix Heredia; 61 Liván Hernández; 50 Bill Hurst; 52 Mark Hutton; 36 Andy Larkin; 25 Al Leiter; 18 Matt Mantei; 51 Terry Mathews; 53 Kurt Miller; 31 Robb Nen; 46 Donn Pall; 32 Alejandro Peña; 58 Yorkis Pérez; 59 Jay Powell; 48 Pat Rapp; 44 Marc Valdes; 35 David Weathers | **Catchers**: 23 Charles Johnson; 13 Bob Natal; 33 Joe Siddall; 9 Gregg Zaun; **Infielders**: 7 Kurt Abbott; 26 Alex Arias; 29 Josh Booty; 34 Luis Castillo; 4 Greg Colbrunn; 14 Craig Grebeck; 37 Ralph Milliard; 45 Russ Morman; 9 Terry Pendleton; 16 Édgar Rentería; 3 Quilvio Veras | **Outfielders**: 35 Jerry Brooks; 19 Jeff Conine; 8 Andre Dawson; 40 Billy McMillon; 6 Joe Orsulak; 10 Gary Sheffield; 20 Jesús Tavárez; 2 Devon White | **Manager**: 21 John Boles; 15 Rene Lachemann; **Coaches**: 12 Joe Breeden (Bullpen); 22 Rusty Kuntz (1st Base); 34 José Morales (Hitting); 1 Cookie Rojas (3rd Base); 47 Larry Rothschild (Pitching); 38 Rick Williams (Assistant Pitching) |

== Player stats ==
=== Batting ===
==== Starters by position ====
Note: Pos = Position; G = Games played; AB = At bats; H = Hits; Avg. = Batting average; HR = Home runs; RBI = Runs batted in

| Pos | Player | G | AB | H | Avg. | HR | RBI |
|---|---|---|---|---|---|---|---|
| C | Charles Johnson | 120 | 386 | 84 | .218 | 13 | 37 |
| 1B | Greg Colbrunn | 141 | 511 | 146 | .286 | 16 | 69 |
| 2B | Quilvio Veras | 73 | 253 | 64 | .253 | 4 | 14 |
| SS | Édgar Rentería | 106 | 431 | 133 | .309 | 5 | 31 |
| 3B | Terry Pendleton | 111 | 406 | 102 | .251 | 7 | 58 |
| LF | Jeff Conine | 157 | 597 | 175 | .293 | 26 | 95 |
| CF | Devon White | 146 | 552 | 151 | .274 | 17 | 84 |
| RF | Gary Sheffield | 161 | 519 | 163 | .314 | 42 | 120 |

==== Other batters ====
Note: G = Games played; AB = At bats; H = Hits; Avg. = Batting average; HR = Home runs; RBI = Runs batted in

| Player | G | AB | H | Avg. | HR | RBI |
|---|---|---|---|---|---|---|
| Kurt Abbott | 109 | 320 | 81 | .253 | 8 | 33 |
| Alex Arias | 100 | 224 | 62 | .277 | 3 | 26 |
| Joe Orsulak | 120 | 217 | 48 | .221 | 2 | 19 |
| Luis Castillo | 41 | 164 | 43 | .262 | 1 | 8 |
| Jesús Tavárez | 98 | 114 | 25 | .219 | 0 | 6 |
| Craig Grebeck | 50 | 95 | 20 | .211 | 1 | 9 |
| Bob Natal | 44 | 90 | 12 | .133 | 0 | 2 |
| Ralph Milliard | 24 | 62 | 10 | .161 | 0 | 1 |
| Andre Dawson | 42 | 58 | 16 | .276 | 2 | 14 |
| Billy McMillon | 28 | 51 | 11 | .216 | 0 | 4 |
| Joe Siddall | 18 | 47 | 7 | .149 | 0 | 3 |
| Greg Zaun | 10 | 31 | 9 | .290 | 1 | 2 |
| Russ Morman | 6 | 6 | 1 | .167 | 0 | 0 |
| Jerry Brooks | 8 | 5 | 2 | .400 | 0 | 3 |
| Josh Booty | 2 | 2 | 1 | .500 | 0 | 0 |

=== Pitching ===
==== Starting pitchers ====
Note: G = Games pitched; IP = Innings pitched; W = Wins; L = Losses; ERA = Earned run average; SO = Strikeouts

| Player | G | IP | W | L | ERA | SO |
|---|---|---|---|---|---|---|
| Kevin Brown | 32 | 233.0 | 17 | 11 | 1.89 | 159 |
| Al Leiter | 33 | 215.1 | 16 | 12 | 2.93 | 200 |
| Pat Rapp | 30 | 162.1 | 8 | 16 | 5.10 | 86 |
| John Burkett | 24 | 154.0 | 6 | 10 | 4.32 | 108 |
| Rick Helling | 5 | 27.2 | 2 | 1 | 1.95 | 26 |
| Andy Larkin | 1 | 5.0 | 0 | 0 | 1.80 | 2 |

==== Other pitchers ====
Note: G = Games pitched; IP = Innings pitched; W = Wins; L = Losses; ERA = Earned run average; SO = Strikeouts

| Player | G | IP | W | L | ERA | SO |
|---|---|---|---|---|---|---|
| Chris Hammond | 38 | 81.0 | 5 | 8 | 6.56 | 50 |
| David Weathers | 31 | 71.1 | 2 | 2 | 4.54 | 40 |
| Mark Hutton | 13 | 56.1 | 5 | 1 | 3.67 | 31 |
| Marc Valdes | 11 | 48.2 | 1 | 3 | 4.81 | 13 |
| Kurt Miller | 26 | 46.1 | 1 | 3 | 6.80 | 30 |

==== Relief pitchers ====
Note: G = Games pitched; W = Wins; L = Losses; SV = Saves; ERA = Earned run average; SO = Strikeouts

| Player | G | W | L | SV | ERA | SO |
|---|---|---|---|---|---|---|
| Robb Nen | 75 | 5 | 1 | 35 | 1.95 | 92 |
| Jay Powell | 67 | 4 | 3 | 2 | 4.54 | 52 |
| Yorkis Pérez | 64 | 3 | 4 | 0 | 5.29 | 47 |
| Terry Mathews | 57 | 2 | 4 | 4 | 4.91 | 49 |
| Félix Heredia | 21 | 1 | 1 | 0 | 4.32 | 10 |
| Matt Mantei | 14 | 1 | 0 | 0 | 6.38 | 25 |
| Donn Pall | 12 | 1 | 1 | 0 | 5.79 | 9 |
| Miguel Batista | 9 | 0 | 0 | 0 | 5.56 | 6 |
| Joel Adamson | 9 | 0 | 0 | 0 | 7.36 | 7 |
| Alejandro Peña | 4 | 0 | 1 | 0 | 4.50 | 5 |
| Bill Hurst | 2 | 0 | 0 | 0 | 0.00 | 1 |
| Liván Hernández | 1 | 0 | 0 | 0 | 0.00 | 2 |

== Farm system ==
| Level | Team | League | Manager |
|---|---|---|---|
| AAA | Charlotte Knights | International League | Sal Rende |
| AA | Portland Sea Dogs | Eastern League | Carlos Tosca |
| A | Brevard County Manatees | Florida State League | Fredi González |
| A | Kane County Cougars | Midwest League | Lynn Jones |
| A-Short Season | Utica Blue Sox | New York–Penn League | Steve McFarland |
| Rookie | GCL Marlins | Gulf Coast League | Juan Bustabad |
