= 1996 New York Mets season =

1996 New York Mets
- League: National League
- Division: East
- Ballpark: Shea Stadium
- City: New York
- Record: 71–91 (.438)
- Divisional place: 4th
- Owners: Fred Wilpon and Nelson Doubleday, Jr.
- General manager: Joe McIlvaine
- Managers: Dallas Green, Bobby Valentine
- Television: WWOR-TV/SportsChannel New York (Ralph Kiner, Tim McCarver, Fran Healy, Howie Rose, Gary Thorne)
- Radio: WFAN (Bob Murphy, Gary Cohen, Ed Coleman); WXLX (spanish) (Juan Alicea)

The 1996 New York Mets season was the 35th regular season for the Mets. They went 71–91 and finished fourth in the National League East, twenty-five games behind the first place Atlanta Braves. The Mets were managed by Dallas Green and Bobby Valentine. They played home games at Shea Stadium.

== Offseason ==
- December 14, 1995: Lance Johnson signed as a free agent with the New York Mets.
- December 19, 1995: Brent Mayne was traded by the Kansas City Royals to the New York Mets for Al Shirley (minors).
- March 31, 1996: Ryan Thompson was traded by the New York Mets with Reid Cornelius to the Cleveland Indians for Mark Clark.

== Regular season ==
After back to back finishes near the top of the National League East, the Mets returned to the losing ways that had plagued the team since 1991. Manager Dallas Green, like his three predecessors in the position, was fired before the season was completed. His replacement was former Texas Rangers manager Bobby Valentine, the manager of the Norfolk Tides.

The Mets did not put up great power numbers as they had in recent years but managed to have two players reach 30 or more home runs. One was catcher Todd Hundley, who broke Roy Campanella's major league record for home runs by a catcher by recording 41. The other was outfielder Bernard Gilkey, who put up 30 home runs of his own. Lance Johnson, acquired in the off season after spending eight years with the Chicago White Sox, had a career year as well. The National League's All-Star center fielder, Johnson hit a career high .333, led the NL in hits with 227, stole 50 bases to set another career high, and recorded sixty extra base hits including a league leading 21 triples; no player since 1930 had that many in the National League.

The Mets traded away infielders Jeff Kent and José Vizcaíno to the Cleveland Indians during the season. The promotion of rookie Rey Ordoñez to be the team's everyday shortstop had both players playing out of position, with Vizcaino at second base and Kent at third. In return the Mets received Carlos Baerga and Alvaro Espinoza, neither of whom made much of an impact.

Mark Clark led the Mets starters with a 14–11 record. Bobby Jones' 12–8 mark was good enough for second best on the team. Jason Isringhausen made more than twenty starts for the only time in his career, finishing with a 6–14 mark.

Alex Ochoa hit for the cycle on July 3 in a 10–6 win in Philadelphia. He was the sixth Met to hit for the cycle.

The Mets and San Diego Padres traveled to Mexico in August, marking the first time a regular season MLB game was played in Mexico.

=== Opening Day Roster ===
- Rico Brogna
- Bernard Gilkey
- Todd Hundley
- Butch Huskey
- Lance Johnson
- Bobby Jones
- Jeff Kent
- Rey Ordóñez
- José Vizcaíno

=== Season standings ===
NL East
| Team | W | L | Pct. | GB | Home | Road |
|---|---|---|---|---|---|---|
| Atlanta Braves | 96 | 66 | .593 | — | 56‍–‍25 | 40‍–‍41 |
| Montreal Expos | 88 | 74 | .543 | 8 | 50‍–‍31 | 38‍–‍43 |
| Florida Marlins | 80 | 82 | .494 | 16 | 52‍–‍29 | 28‍–‍53 |
| New York Mets | 71 | 91 | .438 | 25 | 42‍–‍39 | 29‍–‍52 |
| Philadelphia Phillies | 67 | 95 | .414 | 29 | 35‍–‍46 | 32‍–‍49 |

=== Record vs. opponents ===
1996 National League record Source: MLB Standings Grid – 1996
| Team | ATL | CHC | CIN | COL | FLA | HOU | LAD | MON | NYM | PHI | PIT | SD | SF | STL |
|---|---|---|---|---|---|---|---|---|---|---|---|---|---|---|
| Atlanta | — | 7–5 | 7–5 | 5–7 | 6–7 | 6–6 | 5–7 | 10–3 | 7–6 | 9–4 | 9–3 | 9–4 | 7–5 | 9–4 |
| Chicago | 5–7 | — | 5–8 | 5–7 | 6–6 | 5–8 | 8–5 | 6–6 | 7–5 | 7–6 | 4–9 | 6–6 | 7–5 | 5–8 |
| Cincinnati | 5–7 | 8–5 | — | 7–6 | 3–9 | 7–6 | 4–8 | 3–9 | 6–6 | 10–2 | 5–8 | 9–3 | 9–4 | 5–8 |
| Colorado | 7–5 | 7–5 | 6–7 | — | 5–8 | 8–5 | 6–7 | 3–9 | 7–5 | 6–6 | 7–5 | 8–5 | 5–8 | 8–4 |
| Florida | 7–6 | 6–6 | 9–3 | 8–5 | — | 7–5 | 6–7 | 5–8 | 7–6 | 6–7 | 5–7 | 3–9 | 5–7 | 6–6 |
| Houston | 6–6 | 8–5 | 6–7 | 5–8 | 5–7 | — | 6–6 | 4–9 | 8–4 | 10–2 | 8–5 | 6–6 | 8–4 | 2–11 |
| Los Angeles | 7–5 | 5–8 | 8–4 | 7–6 | 7–6 | 6–6 | — | 9–3 | 8–4 | 7–6 | 6–6 | 5–8 | 7–6 | 8–4 |
| Montreal | 3–10 | 6–6 | 9–3 | 9–3 | 8–5 | 9–4 | 3–9 | — | 7–6 | 6–7 | 7–5 | 4–8 | 9–4 | 8–4 |
| New York | 6–7 | 5–7 | 6–6 | 5–7 | 6–7 | 4–8 | 4–8 | 6–7 | — | 7–6 | 8–5 | 3–10 | 6–6 | 5–7 |
| Philadelphia | 4–9 | 6–7 | 2–10 | 6–6 | 7–6 | 2–10 | 6–7 | 7–6 | 6–7 | — | 7–5 | 4–8 | 6–6 | 4–8 |
| Pittsburgh | 3–9 | 9–4 | 8–5 | 5–7 | 7–5 | 5–8 | 6–6 | 5–7 | 5–8 | 5–7 | — | 4–9 | 8–4 | 3–10 |
| San Diego | 4–9 | 6–6 | 3–9 | 5–8 | 9–3 | 6–6 | 8–5 | 8–4 | 10–3 | 8–4 | 9–4 | — | 11–2 | 4–8 |
| San Francisco | 5–7 | 5–7 | 4–9 | 8–5 | 7–5 | 4–8 | 6–7 | 4–9 | 6–6 | 6–6 | 4–8 | 2–11 | — | 7–6 |
| St. Louis | 4–9 | 8–5 | 8–5 | 4–8 | 6–6 | 11–2 | 4–8 | 4–8 | 7–5 | 8–4 | 10–3 | 8–4 | 6–7 | — |

=== Game log ===
1996 Game Log: 71–91 (Home: 42–39; Away: 29–52)
April: 11–13 (Home: 6–7; Away: 5–6)

| # | Date | Opponent | Score | Win | Loss | Save | Attendance | Record |
|---|---|---|---|---|---|---|---|---|
| 1 | April 1 | Cardinals | 7–6 | **Dipoto** (1–0) | Fossas | **Franco** (1) | 42,060 | 1–0 |
| 2 | April 3 | Cardinals | 3–5 | Stottlemyre | **Person** (0–1) | Eckersley | 13,323 | 1–1 |
| 3 | April 4 | Cardinals | 10–9 | **Franco** (1–0) | Eckersley | — | 15,507 | 2–1 |
| 4 | April 5 | Pirates | 5–7 | Smith | **Mlicki** (0–1) | — | 16,088 | 2–2 |
| 5 | April 6 | Pirates | 0–5 | Darwin | **Clark** (0–1) | — | 20,756 | 2–3 |
| 6 | April 8 | @ Reds | 6–7 | Schourek | **Jones** (0–1) | Brantley | 17,623 | 2–4 |
| 7 | April 9 | @ Reds | 12–5 | **Isringhausen** (1–0) | Smiley | **Franco** (2) | 15,958 | 3–4 |
| 8 | April 10 | @ Reds | 7–9 | Pugh | **Macdonald** (0–1) | Brantley | 16,775 | 3–5 |
| 9 | April 11 | @ Rockies | 3–7 | Reynoso | **Mlicki** (0–2) | — | 48,010 | 3–6 |
| 10 | April 12 | @ Rockies | 5–6 | Freeman | **Clark** (0–2) | Leskanic | 50,045 | 3–7 |
| 11 | April 14 | @ Rockies | 10–4 | **Harnisch** (1–0) | Ritz | **Henry** (1) | 48,051 | 4–7 |
| 12 | April 16 | Astros | 6–9 | Reynolds | **Isringhausen** (1–1) | Jones | 13,795 | 4–8 |
| 13 | April 17 | Astros | 5–7 | Kile | **Wilson** (0–1) | Jones | 12,065 | 4–9 |
| 14 | April 19 | Rockies | 3–5 | Ritz | **Harnisch** (1–1) | Leskanic | 16,225 | 4–10 |
| 15 | April 20 | Rockies | 4–3 (10) | **Franco** (2–0) | Habyan | — | 20,847 | 5–10 |
| 16 | April 21 | Rockies | 4–6 | Leskanic | **Franco** (2–1) | — | 22,737 | 5–11 |
| 17 | April 22 | Reds | 5–1 | **Wilson** (1–1) | Portugal | — | 14,568 | 6–11 |
| 18 | April 23 | Reds | 8–6 (10) | **Henry** (1–0) | Shaw | — | 14,357 | 7–11 |
| 19 | April 24 | @ Cardinals | 4–9 | Petkovsek | **Harnisch** (1–2) | — | 23,189 | 7–12 |
| 20 | April 25 | @ Cardinals | 9–3 | **Clark** (1–2) | Benes | — | 26,933 | 8–12 |
| 21 | April 26 | @ Pirates | 6–10 | Christiansen | **Isringhausen** (1–2) | — | 13,185 | 8–13 |
| 22 | April 27 | @ Pirates | 7–4 | **Mlicki** (1–2) | Miceli | **Franco** (3) | 16,698 | 9–13 |
| 23 | April 28 | @ Pirates | 7–5 | **Jones** (1–1) | Wagner | **Franco** (4) | 27,706 | 10–13 |
| 24 | April 29 | Expos | 3–2 | **Harnisch** (2–2) | Fassero | **Franco** (5) | 14,011 | 11–13 |

May: 11–17 (Home: 6–6; Away: 5–11)

| # | Date | Opponent | Score | Win | Loss | Save | Attendance | Record |
|---|---|---|---|---|---|---|---|---|
| 25 | May 1 | Expos | 0–4 | Martinez | **Clark** (1–3) | — | — | 11–14 |
| 26 | May 1 | Expos | 6–0 | **Isringhausen** (2–2) | Alvarez | — | 16,937 | 12–14 |
| 27 | May 3 | @ Cubs | 2–4 | Navarro | **Wilson** (1–2) | — | 19,822 | 12–15 |
| 28 | May 4 | @ Cubs | 7–3 | **Jones** (2–1) | Castillo | **Henry** (2) | 30,041 | 13–15 |
| 29 | May 5 | @ Cubs | 4–5 | Wendell | **Dipoto** (1–1) | — | 25,949 | 13–16 |
| 30 | May 6 | @ Marlins | 1–4 | Leiter | **Clark** (1–4) | Nen | 16,819 | 13–17 |
| 31 | May 7 | @ Marlins | 2–3 | Hammond | **Isringhausen** (2–3) | Nen | 20,127 | 13–18 |
| 32 | May 8 | @ Marlins | 3–6 | Perez | **Henry** (1–1) | Nen | 21,357 | 13–19 |
| 33 | May 10 | Cubs | 2–0 | **Jones** (3–1) | Castillo | **Franco** (6) | 16,687 | 14–19 |
| 34 | May 11 | Cubs | 7–6 | **Henry** (2–1) | Jones | — | 23,237 | 15–19 |
| 35 | May 12 | Cubs | 0–3 | Bullinger | **Clark** (1–5) | — | 19,122 | 15–20 |
| 36 | May 13 | @ Padres | 2–5 | Valenzuela | **Isringhausen** (2–4) | — | 12,829 | 15–21 |
| 37 | May 14 | @ Padres | 4–9 | Ashby | **Wilson** (1–3) | — | 12,168 | 15–22 |
| 38 | May 15 | @ Padres | 3–4 (10) | Worrell | **Franco** (2–2) | — | 12,166 | 15–23 |
| 39 | May 16 | @ Padres | 6–3 | **Harnisch** (3–2) | Hamilton | **Franco** (7) | 17,341 | 16–23 |
| 40 | May 18 | @ Giants | 14–5 | **Clark** (2–5) | VanLandingham | — | 15,298 | 17–23 |
| 41 | May 19 | @ Giants | 0–1 | Watson | **Isringhausen** (2–5) | Beck | — | 17–24 |
| 42 | May 19 | @ Giants | 2–6 | Gardner | **Wilson** (1–4) | — | 22,959 | 17–25 |
| 43 | May 20 | @ Dodgers | 7–1 | **Jones** (4–1) | Candiotti | — | 26,625 | 18–25 |
| 44 | May 21 | @ Dodgers | 4–6 | Valdez | **Harnisch** (3–3) | Worrell | 27,158 | 18–26 |
| 45 | May 22 | @ Dodgers | 3–2 | **Clark** (3–5) | Nomo | **Franco** (8) | 33,716 | 19–26 |
| 46 | May 24 | Padres | 1–13 | Valenzuela | **Isringhausen** (2–6) | — | 24,751 | 19–27 |
| 47 | May 25 | Padres | 2–7 | Ashby | **Wilson** (1–5) | — | 21,057 | 19–28 |
| 48 | May 26 | Padres | 1–0 | **Jones** (5–1) | Bergman | **Franco** (9) | 20,405 | 20–28 |
| 49 | May 28 | Giants | 4–0 | **Clark** (4–5) | Leiter | **Henry** (3) | 15,733 | 21–28 |
| 50 | May 29 | Giants | 2–4 | VanLandingham | **Isringhausen** (2–7) | Beck | 15,578 | 21–29 |
| 51 | May 30 | Giants | 1–0 | **Wilson** (2–5) | Watson | **Franco** (10) | 15,781 | 22–29 |
| 52 | May 31 | Dodgers | 3–10 | Martinez | **Jones** (5–2) | — | 19,793 | 22–30 |

June: 15–13 (Home: 10–5; Away: 5–8)

| # | Date | Opponent | Score | Win | Loss | Save | Attendance | Record |
|---|---|---|---|---|---|---|---|---|
| 53 | June 1 | Dodgers | 4–3 | **Harnisch** (4–3) | Candiotti | **Franco** (11) | 26,445 | 23–30 |
| 54 | June 2 | Dodgers | 0–1 | Valdez | **Clark** (4–6) | Worrell | 39,328 | 23–31 |
| 55 | June 3 | @ Braves | 4–5 | Clontz | **Macdonald** (0–2) | Wohlers | 30,162 | 23–32 |
| 56 | June 4 | @ Braves | 12–6 | **Wilson** (3–5) | Schmidt | — | 32,199 | 24–32 |
| 57 | June 5 | @ Braves | 6–8 | McMichael | **Mlicki** (1–3) | Wohlers | 31,998 | 24–33 |
| 58 | June 7 | Marlins | 2–12 | Leiter | **Harnisch** (4–4) | — | 13,009 | 24–34 |
| 59 | June 8 | Marlins | 7–6 | **Clark** (5–6) | Weathers | **Franco** (12) | 22,550 | 25–34 |
| 60 | June 9 | Marlins | 3–0 | **Isringhausen** (3–7) | Burkett | — | 40,707 | 26–34 |
| 61 | June 10 | Braves | 8–3 | **Jones** (6–2) | Avery | — | 17,439 | 27–34 |
| 62 | June 11 | Braves | 3–4 (13) | Borbon | **Byrd** (0–1) | Wade | 19,256 | 27–35 |
| 63 | June 12 | Braves | 3–2 | **Clark** (6–6) | Maddux | **Franco** (13) | 18,896 | 28–35 |
| 64 | June 13 | @ Cardinals | 2–1 | **Person** (1–1) | Benes | **Henry** (4) | 30,697 | 29–35 |
| 65 | June 14 | @ Cardinals | 4–13 | Stottlemyre | **Isringhausen** (3–8) | — | 38,556 | 29–36 |
| 66 | June 15 | @ Cardinals | 2–4 | Benes | **Jones** (6–3) | Eckersley | 50,635 | 29–37 |
| 67 | June 16 | @ Cardinals | 4–5 | Petkovsek | **Henry** (2–2) | Eckersley | 31,375 | 29–38 |
| 68 | June 17 | @ Pirates | 7–6 (10) | **Mlicki** (2–3) | Cordova | **Franco** (14) | 11,002 | 30–38 |
| 69 | June 19 | @ Pirates | 5–6 | Plesac | **Isringhausen** (3–9) | — | — | 30–39 |
| 70 | June 19 | @ Pirates | 5–3 | **Mlicki** (3–3) | Cordova | **Franco** (15) | 20,108 | 31–39 |
| 71 | June 20 | Reds | 3–5 | Burba | **Jones** (6–4) | Shaw | 16,994 | 31–40 |
| 72 | June 21 | Reds | 9–4 | **Dipoto** (2–1) | Salkeld | **Mlicki** (1) | 19,432 | 32–40 |
| 73 | June 22 | Reds | 5–2 | **Clark** (7–6) | Schourek | **Franco** (16) | 24,589 | 33–40 |
| 74 | June 23 | Reds | 1–2 | Smiley | **Person** (1–2) | Brantley | 18,593 | 33–41 |
| 75 | June 24 | Rockies | 2–1 | **Isringhausen** (4–9) | Holmes | **Franco** (17) | 16,988 | 34–41 |
| 76 | June 25 | Rockies | 3–2 | **Jones** (7–4) | Thompson | **Franco** (18) | 18,251 | 35–41 |
| 77 | June 26 | Rockies | 9–5 | **Mlicki** (4–3) | Reed | — | 20,675 | 36–41 |
| 78 | June 28 | @ Astros | 7–2 | **Clark** (8–6) | Drabek | **Henry** (5) | 24,569 | 37–41 |
| 79 | June 29 | @ Astros | 1–9 | Reynolds | **Person** (1–3) | — | 35,454 | 37–42 |
| 80 | June 30 | @ Astros | 3–9 | Kile | **Isringhausen** (4–10) | — | 35,981 | 37–43 |

July: 15–13 (Home: 10–5; Away: 5–8)

| # | Date | Opponent | Score | Win | Loss | Save | Attendance | Record |
|---|---|---|---|---|---|---|---|---|
| 81 | July 1 | @ Phillies | 4–6 | Williams | **Jones** (7–5) | Ryan | 20,779 | 37–44 |
| 82 | July 2 | @ Phillies | 2–3 | Springer | **Harnisch** (4–5) | Bottalico | 20,890 | 37–45 |
| 83 | July 3 | @ Phillies | 10–6 | **Byrd** (1–1) | Ryan | **Henry** (6) | 43,158 | 38–45 |
| 84 | July 4 | @ Expos | 4–0 | **Person** (2–3) | Fassero | — | 11,861 | 39–45 |
| 85 | July 5 | @ Expos | 9–6 | **Dipoto** (3–1) | Scott | **Franco** (19) | 13,550 | 40–45 |
| 86 | July 6 | @ Expos | 11–3 | **Jones** (8–5) | Rueter | — | 15,546 | 41–45 |
| 87 | July 7 | @ Expos | 3–4 | Cormier | **Harnisch** (4–6) | Rojas | 16,076 | 41–46 |
| 88 | July 11 | Astros | 8–2 | **Clark** (9–6) | Drabek | — | 18,557 | 42–46 |
| 89 | July 12 | Astros | 1–3 | Reynolds | **Jones** (8–6) | Wagner | 17,405 | 42–47 |
| 90 | July 14 | Astros | 5–7 (11) | Hernandez | **Mlicki** (4–4) | Jones | — | 42–48 |
| 91 | July 14 | Astros | 10–3 | **Harnisch** (5–6) | Hampton | — | 33,505 | 43–48 |
| 92 | July 15 | Phillies | 7–5 | **Dipoto** (4–1) | Springer | **Henry** (7) | 15,549 | 44–48 |
| 93 | July 16 | Phillies | 6–3 | **Clark** (10–6) | Schilling | **Franco** (20) | 18,478 | 45–48 |
| 94 | July 17 | Phillies | 3–2 | **Mlicki** (5–4) | Frey | — | 29,459 | 46–48 |
| 95 | July 18 | Expos | 3–7 | Martinez | **Harnisch** (5–7) | — | 19,467 | 46–49 |
| 96 | July 19 | Expos | 4–5 | Dyer | **Isringhausen** (4–11) | Rojas | 19,005 | 46–50 |
| 97 | July 20 | Expos | 4–1 | **Wilson** (4–5) | Urbina | **Franco** (21) | 27,407 | 47–50 |
| 98 | July 21 | Expos | 3–4 | Fassero | **Clark** (10–7) | Rojas | 32,173 | 47–51 |
| 99 | July 23 | @ Rockies | 7–10 | Ruffin | **Henry** (2–3) | — | 48,016 | 47–52 |
| 100 | July 23 | @ Rockies | 10–11 | Reed | **Henry** (2–4) | — | 48,058 | 47–53 |
| 101 | July 24 | @ Rockies | 6–7 (10) | Leskanic | **Byrd** (1–2) | — | 48,061 | 47–54 |
| 102 | July 26 | @ Reds | 4–7 | Smiley | **Wilson** (4–6) | — | 30,011 | 47–55 |
| 103 | July 27 | @ Reds | 5–7 | Service | **Clark** (10–8) | Brantley | 26,880 | 47–56 |
| 104 | July 28 | @ Reds | 7–1 | **Jones** (9–6) | Jarvis | — | 25,094 | 48–56 |
| 105 | July 29 | Pirates | 5–0 | **Harnisch** (6–7) | Peters | — | 15,680 | 49–56 |
| 106 | July 30 | Pirates | 5–4 | **Isringhausen** (5–11) | Cordova | **Franco** (22) | — | 50–56 |
| 107 | July 30 | Pirates | 4–3 (12) | **Franco** (3–2) | Lieber | — | 18,378 | 51–56 |
| 108 | July 31 | Pirates | 3–2 (10) | **Dipoto** (5–1) | Plesac | — | 15,787 | 52–56 |

August: 8–20 (Home: 3–9; Away: 5–11)

| # | Date | Opponent | Score | Win | Loss | Save | Attendance | Record |
|---|---|---|---|---|---|---|---|---|
| 109 | August 1 | Pirates | 9–13 | Morel | **Mlicki** (5–5) | Ericks | 20,327 | 52–57 |
| 110 | August 2 | Cardinals | 3–4 | Stottlemyre | **Jones** (9–7) | Honeycutt | 34,091 | 52–58 |
| 111 | August 3 | Cardinals | 5–4 | **Harnisch** (7–7) | Benes | **Franco** (23) | 28,594 | 53–58 |
| 112 | August 4 | Cardinals | 2–4 | Morgan | **Isringhausen** (5–12) | Eckersley | 24,595 | 53–59 |
| 113 | August 5 | @ Cubs | 3–7 | Trachsel | **Wilson** (4–7) | — | 36,766 | 53–60 |
| 114 | August 6 | @ Cubs | 0–3 | Navarro | **Clark** (10–9) | Patterson | 24,558 | 53–61 |
| 115 | August 7 | @ Cubs | 11–7 | **Dipoto** (6–1) | Adams | — | 27,086 | 54–61 |
| 116 | August 8 | @ Marlins | 3–0 | **Harnisch** (8–7) | Brown | **Franco** (24) | 21,627 | 55–61 |
| 117 | August 9 | @ Marlins | 1–2 (10) | Nen | **Henry** (2–5) | — | 21,506 | 55–62 |
| 118 | August 10 | @ Marlins | 6–9 | Rapp | **Wilson** (4–8) | Nen | 22,115 | 55–63 |
| 119 | August 11 | @ Marlins | 5–3 | **Clark** (11–9) | Valdes | **Franco** (25) | 21,092 | 56–63 |
| 120 | August 12 | Cubs | 1–11 | Navarro | **Isringhausen** (5–13) | — | 17,636 | 56–64 |
| 121 | August 13 | Cubs | 2–3 | Telemaco | **Harnisch** (8–8) | Wendell | 17,819 | 56–65 |
| 122 | August 14 | Cubs | 8–5 | **Jones** (10–7) | Bullinger | **Franco** (26) | 20,110 | 57–65 |
| 123 | August 16 | @ Padres | 10–15 | Valenzuela | **Person** (2–4) | — | 23,699 | 57–66 |
| 124 | August 17 | @ Padres | 7–3 | **Clark** (12–9) | Worrell | **Henry** (8) | 20,873 | 58–66 |
| 125 | August 18 | @ Padres | 0–8 | Hamilton | **Wilson** (4–9) | — | 22,810 | 58–67 |
| 126 | August 19 | @ Giants | 4–5 | Scott | **Harnisch** (8–9) | Beck | 11,565 | 58–68 |
| 127 | August 20 | @ Giants | 7–3 | **Jones** (11–7) | Fernandez | **Franco** (27) | 10,885 | 59–68 |
| 128 | August 21 | @ Giants | 11–12 | Dewey | **Person** (2–5) | Beck | 11,473 | 59–69 |
| 129 | August 23 | @ Dodgers | 5–7 | Martinez | **Clark** (12–10) | Worrell | 36,909 | 59–70 |
| 130 | August 24 | @ Dodgers | 5–7 | Candiotti | **Wilson** (4–10) | Worrell | 33,201 | 59–71 |
| 131 | August 25 | @ Dodgers | 5–6 | Radinsky | **Franco** (3–3) | Worrell | 39,056 | 59–72 |
| 132 | August 27 | Padres | 3–4 | Blair | **Mlicki** (5–6) | Hoffman | 17,925 | 59–73 |
| 133 | August 28 | Padres | 2–3 (12) | Bergman | **Wallace** (0–1) | Hoffman | 17,442 | 59–74 |
| 134 | August 29 | Padres | 2–3 | Hamilton | **Wilson** (4–11) | Hoffman | 17,016 | 59–75 |
| 135 | August 30 | Giants | 4–6 | Estes | **Harnisch** (8–10) | Beck | 17,581 | 59–76 |
| 136 | August 31 | Giants | 7–2 | **Person** (3–5) | Scott | **Henry** (9) | 23,636 | 60–76 |

September: 11–15 (Home: 7–7; Away: 4–8)

| # | Date | Opponent | Score | Win | Loss | Save | Attendance | Record |
|---|---|---|---|---|---|---|---|---|
| 137 | September 1 | Giants | 6–5 (10) | **Franco** (4–3) | Beck | — | 40,643 | 61–76 |
| 138 | September 2 | Dodgers | 5–8 | Astacio | **Clark** (12–11) | Worrell | 19,658 | 61–77 |
| 139 | September 3 | Dodgers | 6–7 | Radinsky | **Henry** (2–6) | — | 15,646 | 61–78 |
| 140 | September 4 | Dodgers | 3–2 (12) | **Wallace** (1–1) | Dreifort | — | 15,662 | 62–78 |
| 141 | September 6 | @ Braves | 7–8 | Wohlers | **Henry** (2–7) | — | 37,660 | 62–79 |
| 142 | September 7 | @ Braves | 1–6 | Smoltz | **Jones** (11–8) | — | 47,130 | 62–80 |
| 143 | September 8 | @ Braves | 6–2 | **Clark** (13–11) | Maddux | — | 39,045 | 63–80 |
| 144 | September 9 | Marlins | 6–1 | **Mlicki** (6–6) | Brown | — | 14,100 | 64–80 |
| 145 | September 10 | Marlins | 3–9 (12) | Powell | **Henry** (2–8) | — | 14,746 | 64–81 |
| 146 | September 11 | Marlins | 3–1 | **Isringhausen** (6–13) | Rapp | **Wallace** (1) | 12,448 | 65–81 |
| 147 | September 13 | Braves | 6–4 | **Dipoto** (7–1) | Borowski | **Wallace** (2) | 17,331 | 66–81 |
| 148 | September 14 | Braves | 6–5 (12) | **Wallace** (2–1) | Borowski | — | 22,857 | 67–81 |
| 149 | September 15 | Braves | 2–3 | Glavine | **Wilson** (4–12) | Wohlers | 23,718 | 67–82 |
| 150 | September 16 | Braves | 2–5 | Neagle | **Harnisch** (8–11) | — | 14,980 | 67–83 |
| 151 | September 17 | @ Expos | 1–7 | Fassero | **Isringhausen** (6–14) | — | 17,282 | 67–84 |
| 152 | September 18 | @ Expos | 3–4 | Urbina | **Mlicki** (6–7) | Rojas | 14,930 | 67–85 |
| 153 | September 19 | @ Phillies | 7–2 | **Clark** (14–11) | Hunter | — | 16,689 | 68–85 |
| 154 | September 20 | @ Phillies | 5–2 | **Wilson** (5–12) | Mimbs | **Franco** (28) | 22,001 | 69–85 |
| 155 | September 21 | @ Phillies | 1–2 | Schilling | **Harnisch** (8–12) | — | 23,283 | 69–86 |
| 156 | September 22 | @ Phillies | 3–4 | Bottalico | **Wallace** (2–2) | — | 27,672 | 69–87 |
| 157 | September 24 | @ Astros | 4–0 | **Jones** (12–8) | Wall | — | 39,511 | 70–87 |
| 158 | September 25 | @ Astros | 4–5 (10) | Hudek | **Wallace** (2–3) | — | 15,760 | 70–88 |
| 159 | September 26 | @ Astros | 2–6 | Drabek | **Trlicek** (0–1) | — | 13,751 | 70–89 |
| 160 | September 27 | Phillies | 5–6 | Jordan | **Dipoto** (7–2) | Bottalico | 15,889 | 70–90 |
| 161 | September 28 | Phillies | 4–2 | **Person** (4–5) | Maduro | **Wallace** (3) | 16,801 | 71–90 |
| 162 | September 29 | Phillies | 5–9 | Blazier | **Fyhrie** (0–1) | — | 21,975 | 71–91 |

Legend: = Win = Loss
Bold = Mets team member

=== Detailed records ===
National League
| Opponent | W | L | WP | RS | RA |
NL East
| Atlanta Braves | 6 | 7 | 0.462 | 66 | 61 |
| Florida Marlins | 6 | 7 | 0.462 | 45 | 56 |
| Montreal Expos | 6 | 7 | 0.462 | 54 | 47 |
| **New York Mets** | | | | | |
| Philadelphia Phillies | 7 | 6 | 0.538 | 62 | 52 |
| Total | 25 | 27 | 0.481 | 227 | 216 |
NL Central
| Chicago Cubs | 5 | 7 | 0.417 | 47 | 57 |
| Cincinnati Reds | 6 | 6 | 0.500 | 72 | 56 |
| Houston Astros | 4 | 8 | 0.333 | 56 | 62 |
| Pittsburgh Pirates | 8 | 5 | 0.615 | 68 | 68 |
| St. Louis Cardinals | 5 | 7 | 0.417 | 55 | 67 |
| Total | 28 | 33 | 0.459 | 298 | 310 |
NL West
| Colorado Rockies | 5 | 7 | 0.417 | 66 | 67 |
| Los Angeles Dodgers | 4 | 8 | 0.333 | 50 | 60 |
| San Diego Padres | 3 | 10 | 0.231 | 43 | 77 |
| San Francisco Giants | 6 | 6 | 0.500 | 62 | 49 |
| Total | 18 | 31 | 0.367 | 221 | 253 |
| Season Total | 71 | 91 | 0.438 | 746 | 779 |

| Month | Games | Won | Lost | Win % | RS | RA |
|---|---|---|---|---|---|---|
| April | 24 | 11 | 13 | 0.458 | 139 | 140 |
| May | 28 | 11 | 17 | 0.393 | 93 | 114 |
| June | 28 | 15 | 13 | 0.536 | 124 | 129 |
| July | 28 | 15 | 13 | 0.536 | 153 | 122 |
| August | 28 | 8 | 20 | 0.286 | 131 | 159 |
| September | 26 | 11 | 15 | 0.423 | 106 | 115 |
| Total | 162 | 71 | 91 | 0.438 | 746 | 779 |

| | Games | Won | Lost | Win % | RS | RA |
| Home | 81 | 42 | 39 | 0.519 | 335 | 350 |
| Away | 81 | 29 | 52 | 0.358 | 411 | 429 |
| Total | 162 | 71 | 91 | 0.438 | 746 | 779 |

== Roster ==
1996 New York Mets
Roster
| Pitchers: 43 Paul Byrd; 54 Mark Clark; 45 Jerry DiPoto; 31 John Franco; 40 Mike Fyhrie; 27 Pete Harnisch; 35 Doug Henry; 44 Jason Isringhausen; 28 Bobby Jones; 49 Rob MacDonald; 48 Pedro Martínez; 34 Blas Minor; 38 Dave Mlicki; 29 Robert Person; 34 Ricky Trlicek; 47 Derek Wallace; 32 Paul Wilson | Catchers: 30 Alberto Castillo; 7 Charlie Greene; 9 Todd Hundley; 17 Brent Mayne; Infielders: 13 Edgardo Alfonzo; 6 Carlos Baerga; 11 Tim Bogar; 26 Rico Brogna; 12 Álvaro Espinoza; 15 Matt Franco; 19 Jason Hardtke; 42 Butch Huskey; 12 Jeff Kent; 0 Rey Ordóñez; 20 Roberto Petagine; 15 José Vizcaíno | Outfielders: 3 Carl Everett; 23 Bernard Gilkey; 1,51 Lance Johnson; 5 Chris Jones; 22 Alex Ochoa; 18 Kevin Roberson; 33 Andy Tomberlin | Manager: 46 Dallas Green; 2 Bobby Valentine; Coaches: 34 Bob Apodaca (pitching); 4 Mike Cubbage (third base); 55 Frank Howard (first base); 10 Tom McCraw (hitting); 52 Greg Pavlick (pitching); 8 Steve Swisher (bullpen); 7 Bobby Wine (bench) |

== Player stats ==
=== Batting ===
Note: Pos = Position; G = Games played; AB = At bats; H = Hits; Avg. = Batting average; HR = Home runs; RBI = Runs batted in

| Pos | Player | G | AB | H | Avg. | HR | RBI |
|---|---|---|---|---|---|---|---|
| C | Todd Hundley | 153 | 540 | 140 | .259 | 41 | 112 |
| 1B | Butch Huskey | 118 | 414 | 115 | .278 | 15 | 60 |
| 2B | José Vizcaíno | 96 | 363 | 110 | .303 | 1 | 32 |
| SS | Rey Ordóñez | 151 | 502 | 129 | .257 | 1 | 30 |
| 3B | Jeff Kent | 89 | 335 | 97 | .290 | 9 | 39 |
| LF | Bernard Gilkey | 153 | 571 | 181 | .317 | 30 | 117 |
| CF | Lance Johnson | 160 | 682 | 227 | .333 | 9 | 69 |
| RF | Alex Ochoa | 82 | 282 | 83 | .294 | 4 | 33 |

==== Other batters ====
Note: G = Games played, AB = At bats; H = Hits; Avg. = Batting average; HR = Home runs; RBI = Runs batted in

| Player | G | AB | H | Avg. | HR | RBI |
|---|---|---|---|---|---|---|
| Edgardo Alfonzo | 123 | 368 | 96 | .261 | 4 | 40 |
| Carl Everett | 101 | 192 | 46 | .240 | 1 | 16 |
| Rico Brogna | 55 | 188 | 48 | .255 | 7 | 30 |
| Chris Jones | 89 | 149 | 36 | .242 | 4 | 18 |
| Álvaro Espinoza | 48 | 134 | 41 | .306 | 4 | 16 |
| Brent Mayne | 70 | 99 | 26 | .263 | 1 | 6 |
| Roberto Petagine | 50 | 99 | 23 | .232 | 4 | 17 |
| Tim Bogar | 91 | 89 | 19 | .213 | 0 | 6 |
| Carlos Baerga | 26 | 83 | 16 | .193 | 2 | 11 |
| Andy Tomberlin | 63 | 66 | 17 | .258 | 3 | 10 |
| Jason Hardtke | 19 | 57 | 11 | .193 | 0 | 6 |
| Kevin Roberson | 27 | 36 | 8 | .222 | 3 | 9 |
| Matt Franco | 14 | 31 | 6 | .194 | 1 | 2 |
| Alberto Castillo | 6 | 11 | 4 | .364 | 0 | 0 |
| Charlie Greene | 2 | 1 | 0 | .000 | 0 | 0 |

=== Starting pitchers ===
Note: G = Games pitched; IP = Innings pitched; W = Wins; L = Losses; ERA = Earned run average; SO = Strikeouts

| Player | G | IP | W | L | ERA | SO |
|---|---|---|---|---|---|---|
| Mark Clark | 32 | 212.1 | 14 | 11 | 3.43 | 142 |
| Bobby Jones | 31 | 195.2 | 12 | 8 | 4.42 | 116 |
| Pete Harnisch | 31 | 194.2 | 8 | 12 | 4.21 | 114 |
| Jason Isringhausen | 27 | 171.2 | 6 | 14 | 4.77 | 114 |
| Paul Wilson | 26 | 149.0 | 5 | 12 | 5.38 | 109 |

==== Other pitchers ====
Note: G = Games pitched; IP = Innings pitched; W = Wins; L = Losses; ERA = Earned run average; SO = Strikeouts

| Player | G | IP | W | L | ERA | SO |
|---|---|---|---|---|---|---|
| Robert Person | 27 | 89.2 | 4 | 5 | 4.52 | 76 |

===== Relief pitchers =====
Note: G = Games pitched; W = Wins; L = Losses; SV = Saves; ERA = Earned run average; SO = Strikeouts

| Player | G | W | L | SV | ERA | SO |
|---|---|---|---|---|---|---|
| John Franco | 51 | 4 | 3 | 28 | 1.83 | 48 |
| Doug Henry | 58 | 2 | 8 | 9 | 4.68 | 58 |
| Jerry Dipoto | 57 | 7 | 2 | 0 | 4.19 | 52 |
| Dave Mlicki | 51 | 6 | 7 | 1 | 3.30 | 83 |
| Paul Byrd | 38 | 1 | 2 | 0 | 4.24 | 31 |
| Bob MacDonald | 20 | 0 | 2 | 0 | 4.26 | 12 |
| Derek Wallace | 19 | 2 | 3 | 3 | 4.01 | 15 |
| Blas Minor | 17 | 0 | 0 | 0 | 3.51 | 20 |
| Pedro Martínez | 5 | 0 | 0 | 0 | 6.43 | 6 |
| Ricky Trlicek | 5 | 0 | 1 | 0 | 3.38 | 3 |
| Mike Fyhrie | 2 | 0 | 1 | 0 | 15.43 | 0 |

== Awards and records ==
- Lance Johnson, National League leader, Triples (21)

All-Star Game

- Todd Hundley, Catcher, Reserve
- Lance Johnson, Outfield, Reserve

== Farm system ==
| Level | Team | League | Manager |
|---|---|---|---|
| AAA | Norfolk Tides | International League | Bobby Valentine and Bruce Benedict |
| AA | Binghamton Mets | Eastern League | John Tamargo |
| A | St. Lucie Mets | Florida State League | John Gibbons |
| A | Capital City Bombers | South Atlantic League | Howie Freiling |
| A-Short Season | Pittsfield Mets | New York–Penn League | Doug Davis |
| Rookie | Kingsport Mets | Appalachian League | John Stephenson |
| Rookie | GCL Mets | Gulf Coast League | Mickey Brantley |

LEAGUE CHAMPIONS: St. Lucie
