= 1996 Chicago Cubs season =

1996 Chicago Cubs
- League: National League
- Division: Central
- Ballpark: Wrigley Field
- City: Chicago
- Record: 76–86 (.469)
- Divisional place: 4th
- Owners: Tribune Company
- General managers: Ed Lynch
- Managers: Jim Riggleman
- Television: WGN-TV/Superstation WGN/Chicagoland Cable (Harry Caray, Steve Stone, Wayne Larrivee)
- Radio: WGN (Pat Hughes, Ron Santo, Harry Caray)
- Stats: ESPN.com; Baseball Reference

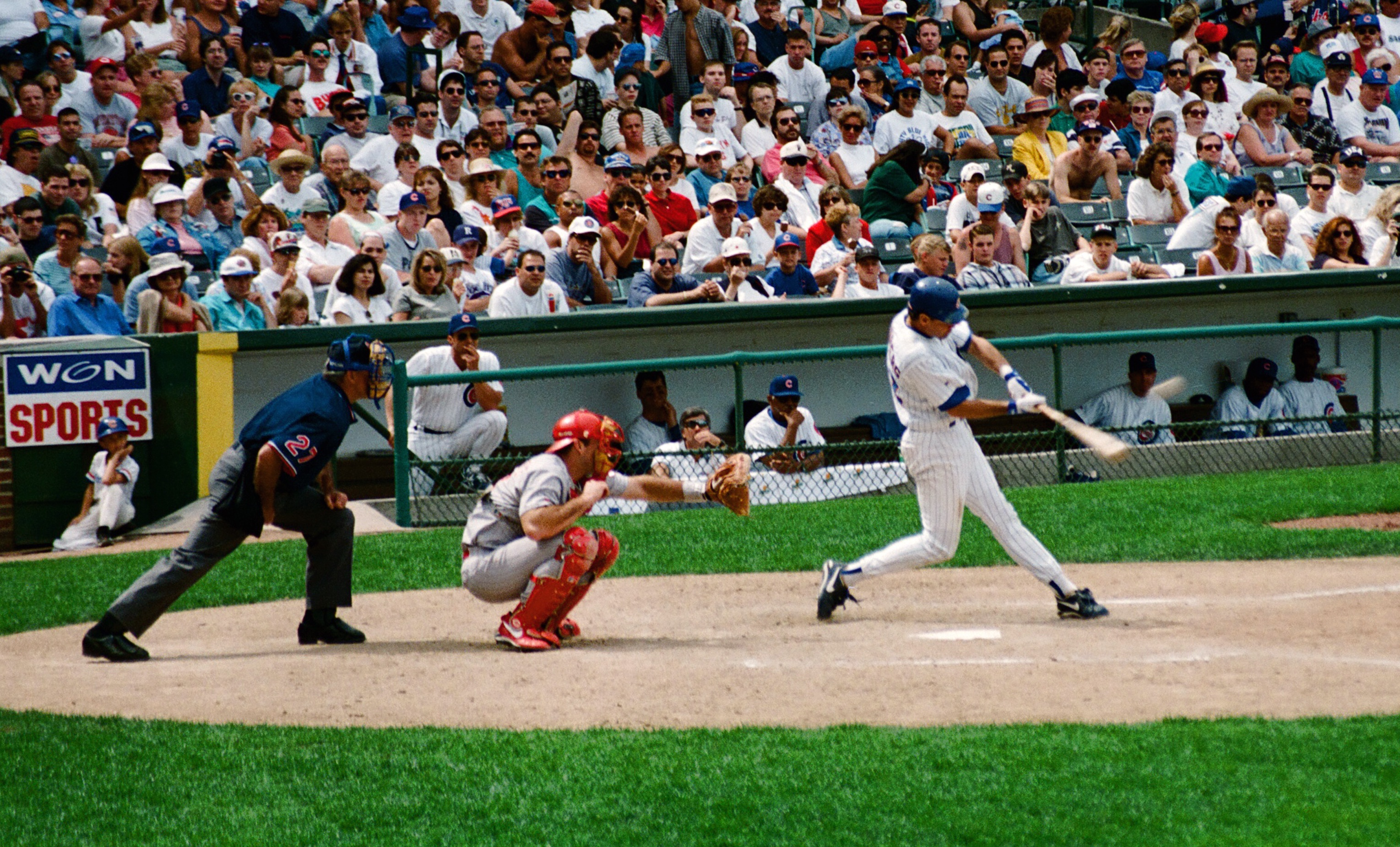

The 1996 Chicago Cubs season was the 125th season of the Chicago Cubs franchise, the 121st in the National League and the 81st at Wrigley Field. The Cubs finished fourth in the National League Central with a record of 76–86.

== Offseason ==
- March 9, 1996: Kent Bottenfield was signed as a free agent with the Chicago Cubs.

== Regular season ==
=== Season standings ===
NL Central
Team	W	L	Pct.	GB	Home	Road
St. Louis Cardinals	88	74	.543	—	48‍–‍33	40‍–‍41
Houston Astros	82	80	.506	6	48‍–‍33	34‍–‍47
Cincinnati Reds	81	81	.500	7	46‍–‍35	35‍–‍46
Chicago Cubs	76	86	.469	12	43‍–‍38	33‍–‍48
Pittsburgh Pirates	73	89	.451	15	36‍–‍44	37‍–‍45

=== Record vs. opponents ===
1996 National League record Source: MLB Standings Grid – 1996
Team	ATL	CHC	CIN	COL	FLA	HOU	LAD	MON	NYM	PHI	PIT	SD	SF	STL
Atlanta	—	7–5	7–5	5–7	6–7	6–6	5–7	10–3	7–6	9–4	9–3	9–4	7–5	9–4
Chicago	5–7	—	5–8	5–7	6–6	5–8	8–5	6–6	7–5	7–6	4–9	6–6	7–5	5–8
Cincinnati	5–7	8–5	—	7–6	3–9	7–6	4–8	3–9	6–6	10–2	5–8	9–3	9–4	5–8
Colorado	7–5	7–5	6–7	—	5–8	8–5	6–7	3–9	7–5	6–6	7–5	8–5	5–8	8–4
Florida	7–6	6–6	9–3	8–5	—	7–5	6–7	5–8	7–6	6–7	5–7	3–9	5–7	6–6
Houston	6–6	8–5	6–7	5–8	5–7	—	6–6	4–9	8–4	10–2	8–5	6–6	8–4	2–11
Los Angeles	7–5	5–8	8–4	7–6	7–6	6–6	—	9–3	8–4	7–6	6–6	5–8	7–6	8–4
Montreal	3–10	6–6	9–3	9–3	8–5	9–4	3–9	—	7–6	6–7	7–5	4–8	9–4	8–4
New York	6–7	5–7	6–6	5–7	6–7	4–8	4–8	6–7	—	7–6	8–5	3–10	6–6	5–7
Philadelphia	4–9	6–7	2–10	6–6	7–6	2–10	6–7	7–6	6–7	—	7–5	4–8	6–6	4–8
Pittsburgh	3–9	9–4	8–5	5–7	7–5	5–8	6–6	5–7	5–8	5–7	—	4–9	8–4	3–10
San Diego	4–9	6–6	3–9	5–8	9–3	6–6	8–5	8–4	10–3	8–4	9–4	—	11–2	4–8
San Francisco	5–7	5–7	4–9	8–5	7–5	4–8	6–7	4–9	6–6	6–6	4–8	2–11	—	7–6
St. Louis	4–9	8–5	8–5	4–8	6–6	11–2	4–8	4–8	7–5	8–4	10–3	8–4	6–7	—

=== Game log ===
1996 Game Log: 76–86 (Home: 43–38; Away: 33–48)
April: 13–14 (Home: 9–7; Away: 4–7)

#	Date	Opponent	Score	Win	Loss	Save	Attendance	Record
1	April 1	Padres	5–4 (10)	**Patterson** (1–0)	Hoffman	—	38,734	1–0
2	April 3	Padres	5–7	Hamilton	**Castillo** (0–1)	Hoffman	29,638	1–1
3	April 4	Dodgers	9–4	**Foster** (1–0)	Astacio	—	12,626	2–1
4	April 5	Dodgers	11–1	**Bullinger** (1–0)	Candiotti	—	19,324	3–1
5	April 6	Dodgers	1–3	Park	**Navarro** (0–1)	Worrell	24,428	3–2
6	April 7	Dodgers	5–4	**Jones** (1–0)	Osuna	—	19,002	4–2
7	April 8	@ Rockies	9–6	**Adams** (1–0)	Ritz	**Jones** (1)	50,185	5–2
8	April 10	@ Rockies	9–10	Leskanic	**Jones** (1–1)	—	50,083	5–3
9	April 12	@ Giants	1–4	Leiter	**Navarro** (0–2)	Beck	45,589	5–4
10	April 13	@ Giants	2–3 (10)	Juden	**Myers** (0–1)	—	22,120	5–5
11	April 14	@ Giants	6–2	**Foster** (2–0)	Watson	**Wendell** (1)	23,137	6–5
12	April 15	Reds	2–3 (10)	Moore	**Patterson** (1–1)	Brantley	20,395	6–6
13	April 16	Reds	6–3	**Trachsel** (1–0)	Portugal	—	11,464	7–6
14	April 17	Reds	8–6 (10)	**Wendell** (1–0)	Ruffin	—	13,023	8–6
15	April 18	Giants	7–6	**Perez** (1–0)	VanLandingham	**Wendell** (2)	15,857	9–6
16	April 19	Giants	10–6	**Foster** (3–0)	Watson	—	17,662	10–6
17	April 20	Giants	4–8	Gardner	**Bullinger** (1–1)	—	28,047	10–7
18	April 21	Giants	6–7	Fernandez	**Trachsel** (1–1)	Beck	28,065	10–8
19	April 22	Rockies	2–4	Freeman	**Navarro** (0–3)	Leskanic	21,227	10–9
20	April 23	Rockies	3–4	Rekar	**Castillo** (0–2)	Leskanic	14,325	10–10
21	April 24	@ Padres	4–5	Hamilton	**Foster** (3–1)	Hoffman	15,608	10–11
22	April 25	@ Padres	3–8	Tewksbury	**Bullinger** (1–2)	—	18,736	10–12
23	April 26	@ Dodgers	0–1	Astacio	**Trachsel** (1–2)	Worrell	31,172	10–13
24	April 27	@ Dodgers	4–3 (10)	**Navarro** (1–3)	Osuna	**Jones** (2)	43,519	11–13
25	April 28	@ Dodgers	3–0	**Castillo** (1–2)	Park	—	45,441	12–13
26	April 29	@ Dodgers	4–10	Valdez	**Foster** (3–2)	—	39,003	12–14
27	April 30	Cardinals	7–6	**Wendell** (2–0)	Eckersley	—	20,771	13–14

May: 9–17 (Home: 6–7; Away: 3–10)

#	Date	Opponent	Score	Win	Loss	Save	Attendance	Record
28	May 1	Cardinals	9–3	**Trachsel** (2–2)	Benes	—	25,668	14–14
29	May 3	Mets	4–2	**Navarro** (2–3)	Wilson	—	19,822	15–14
30	May 4	Mets	3–7	Jones	**Castillo** (1–3)	Henry	30,041	15–15
31	May 5	Mets	5–4	**Wendell** (3–0)	Dipoto	—	25,949	16–15
32	May 6	@ Expos	2–6	Martinez	**Bullinger** (1–3)	—	46,893	16–16
33	May 7	@ Expos	3–8	Veres	**Adams** (1–1)	—	13,236	16–17
34	May 8	@ Expos	2–4	Cormier	**Navarro** (2–4)	Rojas	12,484	16–18
35	May 10	@ Mets	0–2	Jones	**Castillo** (1–4)	Franco	16,687	16–19
36	May 11	@ Mets	6–7	Henry	**Jones** (1–2)	—	23,237	16–20
37	May 12	@ Mets	3–0	**Bullinger** (2–3)	Clark	—	19,122	17–20
38	May 13	Astros	6–0	**Trachsel** (3–2)	Reynolds	—	22,610	18–20
39	May 14	Astros	3–6	Kile	**Navarro** (2–5)	Jones	17,562	18–21
40	May 15	Astros	5–7	Wall	**Castillo** (1–5)	Jones	16,093	18–22
41	May 16	Astros	13–1	**Telemaco** (1–0)	Drabek	—	15,902	19–22
42	May 17	Marlins	3–1	**Bullinger** (3–3)	Leiter	**Wendell** (3)	32,528	20–22
43	May 18	Marlins	2–3	Burkett	**Trachsel** (3–3)	Nen	38,003	20–23
44	May 19	Marlins	7–8 (11)	Mantei	**Wendell** (3–1)	Nen	30,420	20–24
45	May 20	@ Braves	1–18	Avery	**Castillo** (1–6)	—	29,984	20–25
46	May 21	@ Braves	4–2	**Telemaco** (2–0)	Wohlers	**Patterson** (1)	31,045	21–25
47	May 22	@ Braves	4–9	Glavine	**Bullinger** (3–4)	—	33,186	21–26
48	May 24	@ Astros	7–8 (10)	Jones	**Patterson** (1–2)	—	23,910	21–27
49	May 25	@ Astros	2–5	Drabek	**Navarro** (2–6)	Jones	34,326	21–28
50	May 26	@ Astros	2–7	Reynolds	**Castillo** (1–7)	—	33,245	21–29
51	May 27	Braves	1–9	Glavine	**Telemaco** (2–1)	—	33,070	21–30
52	May 29	Braves	0–2	Smoltz	**Trachsel** (3–4)	—	30,601	21–31
53	May 31	@ Marlins	2–1	**Navarro** (3–6)	Rapp	—	19,552	22–31

June: 16–11 (Home: 8–5; Away: 8–6)

#	Date	Opponent	Score	Win	Loss	Save	Attendance	Record
54	June 1	@ Marlins	5–4 (10)	**Wendell** (4–1)	Mathews	—	30,133	23–31
55	June 2	@ Marlins	2–3	Brown	**Telemaco** (2–2)	Nen	22,174	23–32
56	June 3	Phillies	4–3	**Patterson** (2–2)	Ryan	—	26,320	24–32
57	June 4	Phillies	3–12	Williams	**Bullinger** (3–5)	—	15,431	24–33
58	June 5	Phillies	9–6	**Adams** (2–1)	Borland	**Wendell** (4)	18,189	25–33
59	June 7	Expos	3–9	Fassero	**Castillo** (1–8)	—	23,860	25–34
60	June 8	Expos	6–4	**Telemaco** (3–2)	Martinez	**Wendell** (5)	37,373	26–34
61	June 9	Expos	4–2	**Trachsel** (4–4)	Rueter	**Wendell** (6)	30,785	27–34
62	June 10	@ Phillies	2–1	**Navarro** (4–6)	Mulholland	—	19,588	28–34
63	June 11	@ Phillies	9–2	**Campbell** (1–0)	Munoz	—	23,220	29–34
64	June 12	@ Phillies	3–4	Fernandez	**Castillo** (1–9)	Bottalico	27,287	29–35
65	June 13	Padres	6–3 (14)	**Jones** (2–2)	Blair	—	28,953	30–35
66	June 14	Padres	5–1	**Trachsel** (5–4)	Tewksbury	—	30,877	31–35
67	June 15	Padres	1–2	Worrell	**Navarro** (4–7)	Hoffman	39,465	31–36
68	June 16	Padres	8–4	**Castillo** (2–9)	Valenzuela	**Bullinger** (1)	33,376	32–36
69	June 18	Dodgers	6–9	Martinez	**Telemaco** (3–3)	Worrell	—	32–37
70	June 18	Dodgers	7–4	**Campbell** (2–0)	Valdez	—	23,362	33–37
71	June 19	Dodgers	3–4 (13)	Park	**Adams** (2–2)	Worrell	28,477	33–38
72	June 20	@ Padres	3–2	**Navarro** (5–7)	Worrell	**Wendell** (7)	19,969	34–38
73	June 21	@ Padres	1–2 (10)	Hoffman	**Wendell** (4–2)	—	49,503	34–39
74	June 22	@ Padres	9–6 (16)	**Myers** (1–1)	Blair	—	51,917	35–39
75	June 23	@ Padres	4–5	Hamilton	**Telemaco** (3–4)	Hoffman	30,672	35–40
76	June 25	@ Dodgers	2–0	**Trachsel** (6–4)	Nomo	—	37,448	36–40
77	June 26	@ Dodgers	6–4	**Navarro** (6–7)	Candiotti	**Adams** (1)	35,200	37–40
78	June 28	@ Reds	4–7	Smiley	**Castillo** (2–10)	Smith	27,864	37–41
79	June 29	@ Reds	5–9	Portugal	**Bullinger** (3–6)	—	32,273	37–42
80	June 30	@ Reds	6–0	**Trachsel** (7–4)	Burba	—	30,352	38–42

July: 14–12 (Home: 6–6; Away: 8–6)

#	Date	Opponent	Score	Win	Loss	Save	Attendance	Record
81	July 1	@ Pirates	1–4	Darwin	**Navarro** (6–8)	Plesac	15,910	38–43
82	July 2	@ Pirates	15–7	**Telemaco** (4–4)	Wagner	—	13,241	39–43
83	July 3	@ Pirates	2–3	Neagle	**Castillo** (2–11)	Plesac	22,157	39–44
84	July 4	Reds	1–2	Portugal	**Bullinger** (3–7)	Brantley	38,047	39–45
85	July 5	Reds	0–3	Burba	**Trachsel** (7–5)	Brantley	40,743	39–46
86	July 6	Reds	6–2	**Patterson** (3–2)	Carrasco	—	38,690	40–46
87	July 7	Reds	7–6 (13)	**Sturtze** (1–0)	Ruffin	—	36,352	41–46
88	July 11	Cardinals	6–0	**Navarro** (7–8)	Osborne	—	38,802	42–46
89	July 12	Cardinals	3–13	Benes	**Trachsel** (7–6)	—	38,918	42–47
90	July 13	Cardinals	5–10	Stottlemyre	**Bullinger** (3–8)	Eckersley	39,254	42–48
91	July 14	Cardinals	6–7	Benes	**Adams** (2–3)	Eckersley	38,638	42–49
92	July 15	Pirates	12–2	**Castillo** (3–11)	Miceli	—	32,119	43–49
93	July 16	Pirates	5–10	Neagle	**Navarro** (7–9)	—	26,502	43–50
94	July 18	@ Cardinals	6–5	**Bottenfield** (1–0)	Petkovsek	**Wendell** (8)	38,983	44–50
95	July 19	@ Cardinals	1–9	Benes	**Castillo** (3–12)	—	45,336	44–51
96	July 20	@ Cardinals	3–0	**Trachsel** (8–6)	Morgan	**Wendell** (9)	50,418	45–51
97	July 21	@ Cardinals	5–6 (10)	Petkovsek	**Wendell** (4–3)	—	42,257	45–52
98	July 22	@ Giants	2–3	Bautista	**Bottenfield** (1–1)	—	12,902	45–53
99	July 23	@ Giants	9–6	**Myers** (2–1)	DeLucia	**Patterson** (2)	15,878	46–53
100	July 24	@ Giants	7–1	**Castillo** (4–12)	VanLandingham	—	13,695	47–53
101	July 25	@ Rockies	10–8	**Bottenfield** (2–1)	Ruffin	**Patterson** (3)	48,087	48–53
102	July 26	@ Rockies	17–4	**Navarro** (8–9)	Freeman	**Adams** (2)	48,062	49–53
103	July 27	@ Rockies	6–10	Thompson	**Telemaco** (4–5)	—	48,096	49–54
104	July 28	@ Rockies	7–5	**Bullinger** (4–8)	Ritz	**Bottenfield** (1)	48,073	50–54
105	July 30	Giants	4–0	**Castillo** (5–12)	VanLandingham	**Adams** (3)	37,424	51–54
106	July 31	Giants	4–1	**Trachsel** (9–6)	Watson	**Wendell** (10)	28,988	52–54

August: 15–13 (Home: 9–7; Away: 6–6)

#	Date	Opponent	Score	Win	Loss	Save	Attendance	Record
107	August 1	Rockies	4–1	**Navarro** (9–9)	Thompson	**Patterson** (4)	25,564	53–54
108	August 2	Rockies	2–7	Ritz	**Telemaco** (4–6)	—	34,186	53–55
109	August 3	Rockies	2–8	Wright	**Bullinger** (4–9)	—	40,460	53–56
110	August 4	Rockies	1–6	Reynoso	**Castillo** (5–13)	—	38,738	53–57
111	August 5	Mets	7–3	**Trachsel** (10–6)	Wilson	—	36,766	54–57
112	August 6	Mets	3–0	**Navarro** (10–9)	Clark	**Patterson** (5)	24,558	55–57
113	August 7	Mets	7–11	Dipoto	**Adams** (2–4)	—	27,086	55–58
114	August 9	@ Expos	11–9	**Bullinger** (5–9)	Cormier	**Patterson** (6)	15,498	56–58
115	August 10	@ Expos	3–2	**Casian** (1–0)	Dyer	**Wendell** (11)	16,724	57–58
116	August 11	@ Expos	3–4 (10)	Rojas	**Bottenfield** (2–2)	—	20,120	57–59
117	August 12	@ Mets	11–1	**Navarro** (11–9)	Isringhausen	—	17,636	58–59
118	August 13	@ Mets	3–2	**Telemaco** (5–6)	Harnisch	**Wendell** (12)	17,819	59–59
119	August 14	@ Mets	5–8	Jones	**Bullinger** (5–10)	Franco	20,110	59–60
120	August 16	Astros	3–8	Hampton	**Castillo** (5–14)	—	37,139	59–61
121	August 17	Astros	12–3	**Trachsel** (11–6)	Kile	—	39,775	60–61
122	August 18	Astros	10–8	**Navarro** (12–9)	Brocail	**Wendell** (13)	37,210	61–61
123	August 19	Marlins	3–4	Brown	**Telemaco** (5–7)	Nen	32,302	61–62
124	August 20	Marlins	8–1	**Foster** (4–2)	Hutton	—	22,119	62–62
125	August 21	Marlins	8–3	**Castillo** (6–14)	Rapp	—	27,699	63–62
126	August 23	@ Braves	3–4	Maddux	**Trachsel** (11–7)	Wohlers	38,210	63–63
127	August 24	@ Braves	5–6	Clontz	**Casian** (1–1)	—	46,804	63–64
128	August 25	@ Braves	3–2	**Foster** (5–2)	Wohlers	**Wendell** (14)	35,176	64–64
129	August 27	@ Astros	5–6	Morman	**Adams** (2–5)	Hernandez	15,374	64–65
130	August 28	@ Astros	4–5	Olson	**Bottenfield** (2–3)	—	18,026	64–66
131	August 29	@ Astros	4–3	**Navarro** (13–9)	Reynolds	**Wendell** (15)	16,151	65–66
132	August 30	Braves	3–2	**Foster** (6–2)	Glavine	**Patterson** (7)	—	66–66
133	August 30	Braves	5–6	Borowski	**Bottenfield** (2–4)	Wohlers	31,548	66–67
134	August 31	Braves	12–0	**Castillo** (7–14)	Neagle	**Adams** (4)	38,691	67–67

September: 9–19 (Home: 5–6; Away: 4–13)

#	Date	Opponent	Score	Win	Loss	Save	Attendance	Record
135	September 1	Braves	2–1 (12)	**Campbell** (3–0)	Borowski	—	40,192	68–67
136	September 2	@ Marlins	3–4	Valdes	**Trachsel** (11–8)	Nen	16,622	68–68
137	September 3	@ Marlins	11–3	**Navarro** (14–9)	Leiter	—	15,528	69–68
138	September 4	@ Marlins	2–9	Brown	**Foster** (6–3)	—	14,879	69–69
139	September 5	@ Phillies	1–6	Schilling	**Castillo** (7–15)	—	18,164	69–70
140	September 6	@ Phillies	6–4	**Bullinger** (6–10)	Ryan	**Wendell** (16)	17,803	70–70
141	September 7	@ Phillies	2–4	Hunter	**Bottenfield** (2–5)	Bottalico	18,021	70–71
142	September 8	@ Phillies	5–3	**Navarro** (15–9)	Mimbs	**Wendell** (17)	27,600	71–71
143	September 9	Expos	3–1	**Foster** (7–3)	Paniagua	—	24,452	72–71
144	September 10	Expos	10–3	**Bottenfield** (3–5)	Daal	—	26,700	73–71
145	September 11	Expos	1–2	Urbina	**Adams** (2–6)	Rojas	30,729	73–72
146	September 13	Phillies	4–2	**Trachsel** (12–8)	Hunter	**Wendell** (18)	23,048	74–72
147	September 14	Phillies	2–6	Mimbs	**Navarro** (15–10)	Ryan	36,290	74–73
148	September 15	Phillies	1–6	Schilling	**Foster** (7–4)	—	24,697	74–74
149	September 17	@ Cardinals	3–5	Osborne	**Patterson** (3–3)	Mathews	29,612	74–75
150	September 18	@ Cardinals	3–5	Stottlemyre	**Trachsel** (12–9)	Eckersley	32,843	74–76
151	September 19	@ Cardinals	4–5 (13)	Bailey	**Campbell** (3–1)	—	34,923	74–77
152	September 20	@ Pirates	4–6	Lieber	**Foster** (7–5)	Ericks	19,285	74–78
153	September 21	@ Pirates	3–8	Loiselle	**Swartzbaugh** (0–1)	—	23,619	74–79
154	September 22	@ Pirates	3–11 (8)	Cordova	**Castillo** (7–16)	—	27,472	74–80
155	September 23	@ Pirates	4–3	**Trachsel** (13–9)	Schmidt	**Patterson** (8)	7,684	75–80
156	September 24	@ Reds	3–6	Lyons	**Navarro** (15–11)	Brantley	18,584	75–81
157	September 25	@ Reds	3–4	Burba	**Foster** (7–6)	Brantley	18,506	75–82
158	September 26	@ Reds	4–12	Jarvis	**Swartzbaugh** (0–2)	—	20,777	75–83
159	September 27	Pirates	4–7 (10)	Plesac	**Wendell** (4–4)	—	—	75–84
160	September 27	Pirates	10–9	**Adams** (3–6)	Boever	—	18,757	76–84
161	September 28	Pirates	7–8 (10)	Plesac	**Wendell** (4–5)	—	29,729	76–85
162	September 29	Pirates	3–8	Loaiza	**Navarro** (15–12)	—	26,873	76–86

Legend: = Win = Loss
Bold = Cubs team member

=== Detailed records ===
National League
Opponent	W	L	WP	RS	RA
NL East
Atlanta Braves	5	7	0.417	43	61
Florida Marlins	6	6	0.500	56	44
Montreal Expos	6	6	0.500	51	54
New York Mets	7	5	0.583	57	47
Philadelphia Phillies	7	6	0.538	51	59
Total	31	30	0.508	258	265
NL Central
**Chicago Cubs**					
Cincinnati Reds	5	8	0.385	55	63
Houston Astros	5	8	0.385	76	67
Pittsburgh Pirates	4	9	0.308	73	86
St. Louis Cardinals	5	8	0.385	61	74
Total	19	33	0.365	265	290
NL West
Colorado Rockies	5	7	0.417	72	73
Los Angeles Dodgers	8	5	0.615	61	47
San Diego Padres	6	6	0.500	54	49
San Francisco Giants	7	5	0.583	62	47
Total	26	23	0.531	249	216
Season Total	76	86	0.469	772	771

Month	Games	Won	Lost	Win %	RS	RA
April	27	13	14	0.481	136	128
May	26	9	17	0.346	99	130
June	27	16	11	0.593	126	112
July	26	14	12	0.538	150	127
August	28	15	13	0.536	150	123
September	28	9	19	0.321	111	151
Total	162	76	86	0.469	772	771

	Games	Won	Lost	Win %	RS	RA
Home	81	43	38	0.531	413	372
Away	81	33	48	0.407	359	399
Total	162	76	86	0.469	772	771

=== Notable transactions ===
- May 29, 1996: Félix Fermín signed as a free agent with the Chicago Cubs.

== Roster ==
1996 Chicago Cubs
Roster
Pitchers: 51 Terry Adams; 45 Kent Bottenfield; 52 Jim Bullinger; 33 Mike Campbell; 55 Larry Casian; 49 Frank Castillo; 32 Kevin Foster; 27 Doug Jones; 59 Rodney Myers; 38 Jaime Navarro; 35 Bob Patterson; 47 Mike Perez; 34 Tanyon Sturtze; 36 Dave Swartzbaugh; 44 Amaury Telemaco; 46 Steve Trachsel; 13 Turk Wendell	Catchers: 4 Brian Dorsett; 7 Tyler Houston; 6 Mike Hubbard; 9 Scott Servais; Infielders: 20 Bret Barberie; 37 Brant Brown; 2 Félix Fermín; 12 Leo Gómez; 17 Mark Grace; 24 Todd Haney; 18 José Hernández; 16 Dave Magadan; 11 Rey Sánchez; 23 Ryne Sandberg; 15 Terry Shumpert	Outfielders: 10 Scott Bullett; 1 Doug Glanville; 25 Luis Gonzalez; 39 Robin Jennings; 19 Brooks Kieschnick; 56 Brian McRae; 21 Sammy Sosa; 30 Ozzie Timmons; 28 Pedro Valdés	Manager: 5 Jim Riggleman; Coaches: 43 Dave Bialas (bullpen); 31 Fergie Jenkins (pitching); 40 Tony Muser (hitting); 3 Mako Oliveras (first base); 42 Dan Radison (third base); 26 Billy Williams (bench)

== Player stats ==
=== Batting ===
==== Starters by position ====
Note: Pos = Position; G = Games played; AB = At bats; H = Hits; Avg. = Batting average; HR = Home runs; RBI = Runs batted in

Pos	Player	G	AB	H	Avg.	HR	RBI
C	Scott Servais	129	445	118	.265	11	63
1B	Mark Grace	142	547	181	.331	9	75
2B	Ryne Sandberg	150	554	135	.244	25	92
SS	Rey Sánchez	95	289	61	.211	1	12
3B	Leo Gómez	136	362	86	.238	17	56
LF	Luis Gonzalez	146	483	131	.271	15	79
CF	Brian McRae	157	624	172	.276	17	66
RF	Sammy Sosa	124	498	136	.273	40	100

==== Other batters ====
Note: G = Games played; AB = At bats; H = Hits; Avg. = Batting average; HR = Home runs; RBI = Runs batted in

Player	G	AB	H	Avg.	HR	RBI
José Hernández	131	331	80	.242	10	41
Dave Magadan	78	169	43	.254	3	17
Scott Bullett	109	165	35	.212	3	16
Ozzie Timmons	65	140	28	.200	7	16
Tyler Houston	46	115	39	.339	2	19
Doug Glanville	49	83	20	.241	1	10
Todd Haney	49	82	11	.134	0	3
Brant Brown	29	69	21	.304	5	9
Robin Jennings	31	58	13	.224	0	4
Brian Dorsett	17	41	5	.122	1	3
Mike Hubbard	21	38	4	.105	1	4
Terry Shumpert	27	31	7	.226	2	6
Bret Barberie	15	29	1	.034	1	2
Brooks Kieschnick	25	29	10	.345	1	6
Félix Fermín	11	16	2	.125	0	1
Pedro Valdés	9	8	1	.125	0	1

=== Pitching ===
==== Starting pitchers ====
Note: G = Games pitched; IP = Innings pitched; W = Wins; L = Losses; ERA = Earned run average; SO = Strikeouts

Player	G	IP	W	L	ERA	SO
Jaime Navarro	35	236.2	15	12	3.92	158
Steve Trachsel	31	205.0	13	9	3.03	132
Frank Castillo	33	182.1	7	16	5.28	139
Kevin Foster	17	87.0	7	6	6.21	53
Dave Swartzbaugh	6	24.0	0	2	6.38	13

==== Other pitchers ====
Note: G = Games pitched; IP = Innings pitched; W = Wins; L = Losses; ERA = Earned run average; SO = Strikeouts

Player	G	IP	W	L	ERA	SO
Jim Bullinger	37	129.1	6	10	6.54	90
Amaury Telemaco	25	97.1	5	7	5.46	64
Mike Campbell	13	36.1	3	1	4.46	19

==== Relief pitchers ====
Note: G = Games pitched; W = Wins; L = Losses; SV = Saves; ERA = Earned run average; SO = Strikeouts

Player	G	W	L	SV	ERA	SO
Turk Wendell	70	4	5	18	2.84	75
Bob Patterson	79	3	3	8	3.13	53
Terry Adams	69	3	6	4	2.94	78
Kent Bottenfield	48	3	5	1	2.63	33
Rodney Myers	45	2	1	0	4.68	50
Larry Casian	35	1	1	0	1.88	15
Doug Jones	28	2	2	2	5.01	26
Mike Pérez	24	1	0	0	4.67	22
Tanyon Sturtze	6	1	0	0	9.00	7

== Farm system ==
Level	Team	League	Manager
AAA	Iowa Cubs	American Association	Ron Clark
AA	Orlando Cubs	Southern League	Bruce Kimm
A	Daytona Cubs	Florida State League	Dave Trembley
A	Rockford Cubbies	Midwest League	Steve Roadcap
A-Short Season	Williamsport Cubs	New York–Penn League	Rubén Amaro Sr.
Rookie	GCL Cubs	Gulf Coast League	Sandy Alomar Sr.
