= Dave Wainhouse =

Canadian baseball player (born 1967)

- Relief pitcher
- Born: November 7, 1967 (age 58); Toronto, Ontario, Canada
- Batted: Left Threw: Right

MLB debut
- August 3, 1991, for the Montreal Expos

Last MLB appearance
- April 27, 2000, for the St. Louis Cardinals

MLB statistics
- Win–loss record: 2–3
- Earned run average: 7.37
- Strikeouts: 66
- Stats at Baseball Reference

Teams
- Montreal Expos (1991); Seattle Mariners (1993); Pittsburgh Pirates (1996–1997); Colorado Rockies (1998–1999); St. Louis Cardinals (2000)

David Paul Wainhouse (born November 7, 1967) is a Canadian former professional baseball player who pitched for seven seasons in Major League Baseball. A right-hander, Wainhouse was primarily a middle reliever.

== Amateur career ==
Wainhouse attended Mercer Island High School in Mercer Island, Washington, where he played varsity baseball in his senior year. He attended college at Washington State, where he joined the baseball squad as a walk-on. Wainhouse had a strong season in his junior year, finishing with a 7–0 record.

The Montreal Expos selected Wainhouse with their first-round pick of the 1988 Major League Baseball draft, making him the first Canadian-born player picked the first round as well as the highest-ever pick out of Washington State.

Later that summer, prior to making his professional debut, Wainhouse was named to the Canada's Olympic baseball team. At the Seoul Games, baseball was a demonstration event. Canada finished the preliminary round with a 1–2 record and failed to qualify for the medal round.

== Professional career ==
Wainhouse made his pro debut in 1989 with the West Palm Beach Expos of the Single-A Florida State League. He progressed rapidly through the Expos farm system, earning a promotion to the Jacksonville Expos of the Double-A Southern League in 1990. The 1991 season saw Wainhouse start with the Harrisburg Senators of the Double-A Eastern League, get promoted to the Triple-A Indianapolis Indians and, as a September call-up, see a two-game stint in Montreal.

While playing with Indianapolis in 1992, Wainhouse suffered a knee injury that put him on the disabled list for the remainder of the season. That offseason, the Expos traded him to the Seattle Mariners (along with Kevin Foster) for Frank Bolick and a player to be named later. He only appeared in three games for the Mariners at the start of the 1993 season before getting demoted to the minors.

A back injury kept Wainhouse out of action in 1994. He spent the following season in the minor league systems of the Toronto Blue Jays and Florida Marlins, failing to return to the majors until 1996, with the Pittsburgh Pirates. He split time in 1996 and 1997 between the Pirates and their Triple-A affiliate, the Calgary Cannons. At the end of the 1997 campaign, Wainhouse signed with the Colorado Rockies. Just as he did in Pittsburgh, Wainhouse spent 1998 and 1999 shuttling between the major league club and their Triple-A farm team, this time the Colorado Springs Sky Sox.

Wainhouse signed with the St. Louis Cardinals in 2000, once again splitting time between Triple-A and the majors that year. He appeared in nine games with the Cardinals before an injury ended his season.

Wainhouse retired after the 2001 season. In a seven-season major league career, he compiled a career record of 2–3 in 85 games with an ERA of 7.37. Wainhouse now lives in Kent, Washington with his wife and two children. He currently operates a baseball academy and has been named as the assistant coach of the Seattle University Redhawks baseball program.
