= 1996 St. Louis Cardinals season =

Major League Baseball season

1996 St. Louis Cardinals
- National League Central champions
- League: National League
- Division: Central
- Ballpark: Busch Memorial Stadium
- City: St. Louis, Missouri
- Record: 88–74 (.543)
- Divisional place: 1st
- Owners: William DeWitt, Jr.
- General managers: Walt Jocketty
- Managers: Tony La Russa
- Television: KPLR; Prime Sports Midwest (Al Hrabosky, Bob Carpenter, Joe Buck)
- Radio: KMOX (Jack Buck, Mike Shannon, Joe Buck)

The 1996 St. Louis Cardinals season was the Cardinals' 115th season in St. Louis, Missouri and the 105th season in the National League. It was Tony La Russa's first season managing the club, after leaving the Oakland Athletics. During the first year of the William DeWitt, Jr. era, the Cardinals went 88–74 during the season and won their first-ever National League Central title by six games over the Houston Astros. They beat the San Diego Padres in the NLDS, but fell in 7 games to the Atlanta Braves in the NLCS after being up 3–1. DeWitt, along with Drew Bauer and Fred Hanser had bought the Cardinals from Anheuser-Busch during the 1995-96 offseason.

== Offseason ==
- October 23, 1995: The Cardinals hire Tony La Russa as team's manager
- December 23, 1995: Ron Gant was signed as a free agent with the St. Louis Cardinals
- December 23, 1995: Andy Benes was signed as a free agent with the St. Louis Cardinals
- December 15, 1995: Willie McGee was signed as a free agent with the St. Louis Cardinals.
- January 9, 1996: Todd Stottlemyre was traded by the Oakland Athletics to the St. Louis Cardinals for Allen Battle, Carl Dale, Jay Witasick, and Bret Wagner (minors).
- January 11, 1996: Mike Gallego signed as a free agent with the St. Louis Cardinals.
- February 13, 1996: Dennis Eckersley was traded by the Oakland Athletics to the St. Louis Cardinals for Steve Montgomery.
- December 18, 1995: Gary Gaetti signed as a free agent with the St. Louis Cardinals.

=== Ozzie Smith's final season ===
Legendary veteran shortstop Ozzie Smith announced during the season that it would be his last season in the Major Leagues, while veteran outfielder Willie McGee, was brought back to the Cards as a free agent. Though the tension between Smith and exciting youngster Royce Clayton, acquired in a trade, grew thick and troublesome at times as they shared time at shortstop, both players had good seasons. McGee came off the bench and started when needed.

== Regular season ==
=== Season standings ===
NL Central
Team	W	L	Pct.	GB	Home	Road
St. Louis Cardinals	88	74	.543	—	48‍–‍33	40‍–‍41
Houston Astros	82	80	.506	6	48‍–‍33	34‍–‍47
Cincinnati Reds	81	81	.500	7	46‍–‍35	35‍–‍46
Chicago Cubs	76	86	.469	12	43‍–‍38	33‍–‍48
Pittsburgh Pirates	73	89	.451	15	36‍–‍44	37‍–‍45

=== Record vs. opponents ===
1996 National League record Source: MLB Standings Grid – 1996
Team	ATL	CHC	CIN	COL	FLA	HOU	LAD	MON	NYM	PHI	PIT	SD	SF	STL
Atlanta	—	7–5	7–5	5–7	6–7	6–6	5–7	10–3	7–6	9–4	9–3	9–4	7–5	9–4
Chicago	5–7	—	5–8	5–7	6–6	5–8	8–5	6–6	7–5	7–6	4–9	6–6	7–5	5–8
Cincinnati	5–7	8–5	—	7–6	3–9	7–6	4–8	3–9	6–6	10–2	5–8	9–3	9–4	5–8
Colorado	7–5	7–5	6–7	—	5–8	8–5	6–7	3–9	7–5	6–6	7–5	8–5	5–8	8–4
Florida	7–6	6–6	9–3	8–5	—	7–5	6–7	5–8	7–6	6–7	5–7	3–9	5–7	6–6
Houston	6–6	8–5	6–7	5–8	5–7	—	6–6	4–9	8–4	10–2	8–5	6–6	8–4	2–11
Los Angeles	7–5	5–8	8–4	7–6	7–6	6–6	—	9–3	8–4	7–6	6–6	5–8	7–6	8–4
Montreal	3–10	6–6	9–3	9–3	8–5	9–4	3–9	—	7–6	6–7	7–5	4–8	9–4	8–4
New York	6–7	5–7	6–6	5–7	6–7	4–8	4–8	6–7	—	7–6	8–5	3–10	6–6	5–7
Philadelphia	4–9	6–7	2–10	6–6	7–6	2–10	6–7	7–6	6–7	—	7–5	4–8	6–6	4–8
Pittsburgh	3–9	9–4	8–5	5–7	7–5	5–8	6–6	5–7	5–8	5–7	—	4–9	8–4	3–10
San Diego	4–9	6–6	3–9	5–8	9–3	6–6	8–5	8–4	10–3	8–4	9–4	—	11–2	4–8
San Francisco	5–7	5–7	4–9	8–5	7–5	4–8	6–7	4–9	6–6	6–6	4–8	2–11	—	7–6
St. Louis	4–9	8–5	8–5	4–8	6–6	11–2	4–8	4–8	7–5	8–4	10–3	8–4	6–7	—

=== Game log ===
1996 Game Log: 88–74 (Home: 48–33; Away: 40–41)
April: 12–15 (Home: 7–8; Away: 5–7)

#	Date	Opponent	Score	Win	Loss	Save	Attendance	Record
1	April 1	@ Mets	6–7	Dipoto	**Fossas** (0–1)	Franco	42,060	0–1
2	April 3	@ Mets	5–3	**Stottlemyre** (1–0)	Person	**Eckersley** (1)	13,323	1–1
3	April 4	@ Mets	9–10	Franco	**Eckersley** (0–1)	—	15,507	1–2
4	April 5	@ Braves	5–4 (14)	**Bailey** (1–0)	Bielecki	**Eckersley** (2)	31,071	2–2
5	April 6	@ Braves	3–2 (12)	**Parrett** (1–0)	Clontz	—	34,649	3–2
6	April 7	@ Braves	3–13	Schmidt	**Busby** (0–1)	—	28,498	3–3
7	April 8	Expos	3–4 (10)	Rojas	**Parrett** (1–1)	—	52,841	3–4
8	April 10	Expos	4–1	**Benes** (1–0)	Paniagua	—	27,734	4–4
9	April 11	Phillies	2–1	**Benes** (2–0)	Mulholland	**Mathews** (1)	23,412	5–4
10	April 12	Phillies	6–1	**Urbani** (1–0)	Williams	—	26,753	6–4
11	April 13	Phillies	2–4	Hunter	**Fossas** (0–2)	Bottalico	28,913	6–5
12	April 14	Phillies	6–5	**Mathews** (1–0)	Fernandez	**Eckersley** (3)	27,545	7–5
13	April 15	Pirates	6–4	**Benes** (3–0)	Ericks	**Honeycutt** (1)	18,731	8–5
14	April 16	Pirates	3–13	Smith	**Benes** (3–1)	Lieber	21,349	8–6
15	April 17	Pirates	6–1	**Osborne** (1–0)	Darwin	—	23,074	9–6
16	April 18	Pirates	2–6	Wagner	**Stottlemyre** (1–1)	—	25,700	9–7
17	April 19	@ Phillies	1–0	**Bailey** (2–0)	Springer	**Eckersley** (4)	25,614	10–7
18	April 20	@ Phillies	1–0	**Benes** (4–1)	Bottalico	**Eckersley** (5)	23,630	11–7
19	April 21	@ Phillies	2–4	Grace	**Benes** (4–2)	Bottalico	32,896	11–8
20	April 22	@ Expos	0–8	Cormier	**Osborne** (1–1)	—	9,778	11–9
21	April 23	@ Expos	11–12	Scott	**Mathews** (1–1)	—	8,352	11–10
22	April 24	Mets	9–4	**Petkovsek** (1–0)	Harnisch	—	23,189	12–10
23	April 25	Mets	3–9	Clark	**Benes** (4–3)	—	26,933	12–11
24	April 26	Braves	1–6	Avery	**Benes** (4–4)	—	34,598	12–12
25	April 27	Braves	2–7	Maddux	**Osborne** (1–2)	—	20,757	12–13
26	April 29	Braves	1–4	Glavine	**Stottlemyre** (1–2)	Wohlers	25,452	12–14
27	April 30	@ Cubs	6–7	Wendell	**Eckersley** (0–2)	—	20,771	12–15

May: 12–14 (Home: 4–6; Away: 8–8)

#	Date	Opponent	Score	Win	Loss	Save	Attendance	Record
28	May 1	@ Cubs	3–9	Trachsel	**Benes** (4–5)	—	25,668	12–16
29	May 3	@ Padres	3–1	**Osborne** (2–2)	Ashby	**Eckersley** (6)	21,335	13–16
30	May 4	@ Padres	4–3	**Stottlemyre** (2–2)	Bergman	**Eckersley** (7)	44,375	14–16
31	May 5	@ Padres	4–10	Hamilton	**Benes** (4–6)	—	27,435	14–17
32	May 7	Giants	2–4	Watson	**Fossas** (0–3)	Beck	23,492	14–18
33	May 8	Giants	7–10	Gardner	**Benes** (4–7)	Beck	22,517	14–19
34	May 9	Giants	16–8	**Parrett** (2–1)	Dewey	—	37,920	15–19
35	May 10	Dodgers	2–3 (12)	Worrell	**Eckersley** (0–3)	—	36,821	15–20
36	May 11	Dodgers	2–4	Valdez	**Benes** (4–8)	Worrell	38,008	15–21
37	May 12	Dodgers	6–5	**Petkovsek** (2–0)	Nomo	**Eckersley** (8)	38,549	16–21
38	May 13	@ Marlins	2–5	Burkett	**Benes** (4–9)	Powell	19,227	16–22
39	May 14	@ Marlins	5–11	Mathews	**Parrett** (2–2)	—	16,070	16–23
40	May 15	@ Marlins	6–0	**Stottlemyre** (3–2)	Rapp	—	18,066	17–23
41	May 17	@ Rockies	11–12	Leskanic	**Bailey** (2–1)	Ruffin	48,074	17–24
42	May 18	@ Rockies	8–9	Habyan	**Eckersley** (0–4)	—	48,103	17–25
43	May 19	@ Rockies	3–10	Thompson	**Benes** (4–10)	—	48,075	17–26
44	May 20	@ Astros	5–3	**Osborne** (3–2)	Drabek	—	14,547	18–26
45	May 21	@ Astros	8–2	**Stottlemyre** (4–2)	Reynolds	—	17,935	19–26
46	May 22	@ Astros	5–2	**Benes** (5–10)	Kile	**Mathews** (2)	15,353	20–26
47	May 24	@ Marlins	4–2	**Morgan** (1–0)	Burkett	**Mathews** (3)	19,583	21–26
48	May 25	@ Marlins	5–0	**Benes** (6–10)	Rapp	—	26,312	22–26
49	May 26	@ Marlins	2–8 (7)	Weathers	**Osborne** (3–3)	—	20,573	22–27
50	May 27	Rockies	2–5	Ritz	**Stottlemyre** (4–3)	Ruffin	38,804	22–28
51	May 28	Rockies	5–6	Painter	**Mathews** (1–2)	Holmes	26,913	22–29
52	May 29	Rockies	6–5	**Petkovsek** (3–0)	Leskanic	**Benes** (1)	27,856	23–29
53	May 31	Astros	6–4	**Osborne** (4–3)	Swindell	**Fossas** (1)	37,625	24–29

June: 17–10 (Home: 10–1; Away: 7–9)

#	Date	Opponent	Score	Win	Loss	Save	Attendance	Record
54	June 1	Astros	5–4 (10)	**Bailey** (3–1)	Hernandez	—	34,958	25–29
55	June 2	Astros	2–0	**Stottlemyre** (5–3)	Kile	—	32,703	26–29
56	June 3	@ Padres	3–0	**Benes** (7–10)	Tewksbury	—	13,625	27–29
57	June 4	@ Padres	11–5	**Petkovsek** (4–0)	Worrell	—	13,427	28–29
58	June 5	@ Padres	4–6	Hoffman	**Fossas** (0–4)	—	12,216	28–30
59	June 7	@ Giants	9–4	**Benes** (8–10)	Fernandez	—	13,009	29–30
60	June 8	@ Giants	1–4	DeLucia	**Stottlemyre** (5–4)	Beck	20,401	29–31
61	June 9	@ Giants	0–9	Watson	**Benes** (8–11)	—	24,176	29–32
62	June 10	@ Dodgers	1–2	Park	**Morgan** (1–1)	Osuna	54,043	29–33
63	June 11	@ Dodgers	6–3	**Osborne** (5–3)	Martinez	**Honeycutt** (2)	29,096	30–33
64	June 13	Mets	1–2	Person	**Benes** (8–12)	Henry	30,697	30–34
65	June 14	Mets	13–4	**Stottlemyre** (6–4)	Isringhausen	—	38,556	31–34
66	June 15	Mets	4–2	**Benes** (9–12)	Jones	**Eckersley** (9)	50,635	32–34
67	June 16	Mets	5–4	**Petkovsek** (5–0)	Henry	**Eckersley** (10)	31,375	33–34
68	June 18	Phillies	3–2	**Osborne** (6–3)	Fernandez	**Eckersley** (11)	31,311	34–34
69	June 19	Phillies	3–2	**Benes** (10–12)	Bottalico	—	34,612	35–34
70	June 20	@ Expos	3–8	Rueter	**Stottlemyre** (6–5)	—	15,095	35–35
71	June 21	@ Expos	3–4 (12)	Rojas	**Eckersley** (0–5)	—	16,136	35–36
72	June 22	@ Expos	9–4	**Morgan** (2–1)	Urbina	—	16,895	36–36
73	June 23	@ Expos	2–3	Fassero	**Osborne** (6–4)	Rojas	22,168	36–37
74	June 24	@ Braves	9–2	**Benes** (11–12)	Smoltz	—	31,971	37–37
75	June 25	@ Braves	3–4	Schmidt	**Stottlemyre** (6–6)	Wohlers	30,942	37–38
76	June 26	@ Braves	11–7	**Benes** (12–12)	Avery	—	31,191	38–38
77	June 27	@ Braves	0–3	Maddux	**Morgan** (2–2)	Wohlers	32,243	38–39
78	June 28	Pirates	6–1	**Osborne** (7–4)	Neagle	—	34,490	39–39
79	June 29	Pirates	6–5	**Honeycutt** (1–0)	Miceli	—	34,426	40–39
80	June 30	Pirates	10–3	**Stottlemyre** (7–6)	Smith	—	38,901	41–39

July: 15–11 (Home: 6–8; Away: 9–3)

#	Date	Opponent	Score	Win	Loss	Save	Attendance	Record
81	July 1	Reds	5–8	Carrasco	**Benes** (12–13)	Brantley	27,221	41–40
82	July 2	Reds	4–3	**Honeycutt** (2–0)	Smith	**Eckersley** (12)	29,074	42–40
83	July 3	Reds	4–0	**Osborne** (8–4)	Smiley	—	32,658	43–40
84	July 4	@ Pirates	7–1	**Benes** (13–13)	Dessens	—	23,321	44–40
85	July 5	@ Pirates	7–4	**Stottlemyre** (8–6)	Smith	**Fossas** (2)	18,759	45–40
86	July 6	@ Pirates	9–5	**Benes** (14–13)	Darwin	—	19,144	46–40
87	July 7	@ Pirates	2–8	Lieber	**Morgan** (2–3)	—	16,255	46–41
88	July 11	@ Cubs	0–6	Navarro	**Osborne** (8–5)	—	38,802	46–42
89	July 12	@ Cubs	13–3	**Benes** (15–13)	Trachsel	—	38,918	47–42
90	July 13	@ Cubs	10–5	**Stottlemyre** (9–6)	Bullinger	**Eckersley** (13)	39,254	48–42
91	July 14	@ Cubs	7–6	**Benes** (16–13)	Adams	**Eckersley** (14)	38,638	49–42
92	July 15	@ Reds	8–3	**Morgan** (3–3)	Salkeld	—	38,450	50–42
93	July 16	@ Reds	5–4	**Osborne** (9–5)	Shaw	**Eckersley** (15)	23,370	51–42
94	July 17	@ Reds	6–4	**Benes** (17–13)	Portugal	**Eckersley** (16)	28,879	52–42
95	July 18	Cubs	5–6	Bottenfield	**Petkovsek** (5–1)	Wendell	38,983	52–43
96	July 19	Cubs	9–1	**Benes** (18–13)	Castillo	—	45,336	53–43
97	July 20	Cubs	0–3	Trachsel	**Morgan** (3–4)	Wendell	50,418	53–44
98	July 21	Cubs	6–5 (10)	**Petkovsek** (6–1)	Wendell	—	42,257	54–44
99	July 22	Braves	6–8	McMichael	**Mathews** (1–3)	Wohlers	36,215	54–45
100	July 23	Braves	2–3	Smoltz	**Stottlemyre** (9–7)	Wohlers	35,520	54–46
101	July 24	Braves	1–4	Wade	**Benes** (18–14)	McMichael	35,411	54–47
102	July 25	Expos	2–4	Urbina	**Petkovsek** (6–2)	Rojas	34,271	54–48
103	July 26	Expos	1–5	Fassero	**Osborne** (9–6)	—	30,048	54–49
104	July 27	Expos	6–3	**Benes** (19–14)	Dyer	**Eckersley** (17)	44,269	55–49
105	July 28	Expos	6–4	**Petkovsek** (7–2)	Martinez	**Mathews** (4)	31,226	56–49
106	July 30	@ Phillies	7–8	Ryan	**Mathews** (1–4)	—	20,166	56–50

August: 15–15 (Home: 10–8; Away: 5–7)

#	Date	Opponent	Score	Win	Loss	Save	Attendance	Record
107	August 1	@ Phillies	1–2	Springer	**Osborne** (9–7)	Ryan	—	56–51
108	August 1	@ Phillies	7–1	**Benes** (20–14)	Mimbs	—	22,934	57–51
109	August 2	@ Mets	4–3	**Stottlemyre** (10–7)	Jones	**Honeycutt** (3)	34,091	58–51
110	August 3	@ Mets	4–5	Harnisch	**Benes** (20–15)	Franco	28,594	58–52
111	August 4	@ Mets	4–2	**Morgan** (4–4)	Isringhausen	**Eckersley** (18)	24,595	59–52
112	August 5	Padres	8–2	**Benes** (21–15)	Tewksbury	—	28,653	60–52
113	August 6	Padres	0–1	Worrell	**Osborne** (9–8)	Hoffman	25,782	60–53
114	August 7	Padres	1–0	**Petkovsek** (8–2)	Bochtler	—	24,823	61–53
115	August 8	Giants	3–5 (10)	Poole	**Honeycutt** (2–1)	Beck	34,844	61–54
116	August 9	Giants	6–8	Fernandez	**Morgan** (4–5)	Beck	30,118	61–55
117	August 10	Giants	7–1	**Benes** (22–15)	VanLandingham	—	49,344	62–55
118	August 11	Giants	5–3	**Osborne** (10–8)	Watson	**Eckersley** (19)	30,139	63–55
119	August 13	Dodgers	4–8	Candiotti	**Stottlemyre** (10–8)	—	30,761	63–56
120	August 14	Dodgers	6–1	**Benes** (23–15)	Valdez	—	26,945	64–56
121	August 15	Dodgers	2–5	Nomo	**Morgan** (4–6)	Worrell	32,930	64–57
122	August 16	Marlins	6–2	**Benes** (24–15)	Rapp	—	30,507	65–57
123	August 17	Marlins	4–3	**Mathews** (2–4)	Powell	**Eckersley** (20)	30,792	66–57
124	August 18	Marlins	5–3	**Stottlemyre** (11–8)	Leiter	**Eckersley** (21)	34,564	67–57
125	August 20	@ Rockies	4–5 (13)	Munoz	**Mathews** (2–5)	—	48,126	67–58
126	August 21	@ Rockies	2–10	Reynoso	**Benes** (24–16)	—	48,045	67–59
127	August 22	@ Rockies	5–10	Bailey	**Morgan** (4–7)	—	48,086	67–60
128	August 23	@ Astros	1–0	**Osborne** (11–8)	Kile	**Eckersley** (22)	35,554	68–60
129	August 24	@ Astros	1–3	Reynolds	**Stottlemyre** (11–9)	—	43,258	68–61
130	August 25	@ Astros	1–4	Wall	**Benes** (24–17)	Hernandez	31,609	68–62
131	August 26	@ Astros	3–2	**Benes** (25–17)	Hampton	**Eckersley** (23)	21,624	69–62
132	August 27	Marlins	3–6	Hutton	**Morgan** (4–8)	Nen	24,784	69–63
133	August 28	Marlins	2–3 (10)	Hammond	**Bailey** (3–2)	Nen	21,767	69–64
134	August 29	Marlins	9–10	Leiter	**Stottlemyre** (11–10)	Nen	23,105	69–65
135	August 30	Rockies	7–4	**Benes** (26–17)	Wright	**Eckersley** (24)	25,530	70–65
136	August 31	Rockies	2–1	**Benes** (27–17)	Bailey	**Eckersley** (25)	35,804	71–65

September: 17–9 (Home: 11–2; Away: 6–7)

#	Date	Opponent	Score	Win	Loss	Save	Attendance	Record
137	September 1	Rockies	15–6	**Petkovsek** (9–2)	Rekar	—	28,552	72–65
138	September 2	Astros	8–7 (10)	**Benes** (28–17)	Brocail	—	32,955	73–65
139	September 3	Astros	12–3	**Stottlemyre** (12–10)	Reynolds	—	23,955	74–65
140	September 4	Astros	6–4	**Benes** (29–17)	Wall	**Eckersley** (26)	34,891	75–65
141	September 6	Padres	8–3	**Petkovsek** (10–2)	Tewksbury	—	28,116	76–65
142	September 7	Padres	8–3	**Osborne** (12–8)	Ashby	—	42,846	77–65
143	September 8	Padres	4–5	Valenzuela	**Stottlemyre** (12–11)	Hoffman	30,897	77–66
144	September 9	@ Giants	6–2	**Benes** (30–17)	Gardner	—	10,307	78–66
145	September 10	@ Giants	1–0	**Petkovsek** (11–2)	Rueter	**Eckersley** (27)	8,770	79–66
146	September 11	@ Giants	2–4	Scott	**Benes** (30–18)	Beck	9,673	79–67
147	September 12	@ Dodgers	1–4	Nomo	**Osborne** (12–9)	Osuna	34,191	79–68
148	September 13	@ Dodgers	2–0	**Batchelor** (1–0)	Guthrie	**Eckersley** (28)	36,657	80–68
149	September 14	@ Dodgers	5–9	Martinez	**Benes** (30–19)	—	44,548	80–69
150	September 15	@ Dodgers	5–6	Radinsky	**Eckersley** (0–6)	Worrell	35,803	80–70
151	September 17	Cubs	5–3	**Osborne** (13–9)	Patterson	**Mathews** (5)	29,612	81–70
152	September 18	Cubs	5–3	**Stottlemyre** (13–11)	Trachsel	**Eckersley** (29)	32,843	82–70
153	September 19	Cubs	5–4 (13)	**Bailey** (4–2)	Campbell	—	34,923	83–70
154	September 20	@ Reds	2–4	Burba	**Benes** (30–20)	Brantley	23,496	83–71
155	September 22	@ Reds	3–6	Shaw	**Mathews** (2–6)	Brantley	—	83–72
156	September 22	@ Reds	0–6	Smiley	**Jackson** (0–1)	—	38,225	83–73
157	September 23	@ Reds	3–2	**Stottlemyre** (14–11)	Morgan	**Eckersley** (30)	17,313	84–73
158	September 24	@ Pirates	7–1	**Benes** (31–20)	Loaiza	—	8,611	85–73
159	September 25	@ Pirates	8–7 (11)	**Bailey** (5–2)	Miceli	**Mathews** (6)	20,022	86–73
160	September 27	Reds	2–1 (11)	**Batchelor** (2–0)	Shaw	—	39,730	87–73
161	September 28	Reds	5–2	**Jackson** (1–1)	Morgan	**Honeycutt** (4)	52,876	88–73
162	September 29	Reds	3–6	Lyons	**Ludwick** (0–1)	Brantley	51,379	88–74

Legend: = Win = Loss
Bold = Cardinals team member

=== Detailed records ===
National League
Opponent	W	L	WP	RS	RA
NL East
Atlanta Braves	4	9	0.308	47	67
Florida Marlins	6	6	0.500	53	53
Montreal Expos	4	8	0.333	50	60
New York Mets	7	5	0.583	67	55
Philadelphia Phillies	8	4	0.667	41	30
Total	29	32	0.475	258	265
NL Central
Chicago Cubs	8	5	0.615	74	61
Cincinnati Reds	8	5	0.615	50	49
Houston Astros	11	2	0.846	63	38
Pittsburgh Pirates	10	3	0.769	79	59
**St. Louis Cardinals**					
Total	37	15	0.712	266	207
NL West
Colorado Rockies	4	8	0.333	70	83
Los Angeles Dodgers	4	8	0.333	42	50
San Diego Padres	8	4	0.667	58	39
San Francisco Giants	6	7	0.462	65	62
Total	22	27	0.449	235	234
Season Total	88	74	0.543	759	706

Month	Games	Won	Lost	Win %	RS	RA
April	27	12	15	0.444	108	140
May	26	12	14	0.462	132	141
June	27	17	10	0.630	133	97
July	26	15	11	0.577	138	114
August	30	15	15	0.500	117	113
September	26	17	9	0.654	131	101
Total	162	88	74	0.543	759	706

	Games	Won	Lost	Win %	RS	RA
Home	81	48	33	0.593	391	326
Away	81	40	41	0.494	368	380
Total	162	88	74	0.543	759	706

=== Opening Day starters ===
- Luis Alicea
- Gary Gaetti
- Ron Gant
- Ray Lankford
- John Mabry
- Willie McGee
- Pat Borders
- Ozzie Smith
- Todd Stottlemyre

== Roster ==
1996 St. Louis Cardinals
Roster
Pitchers: 39 Cory Bailey; 52 Brian Barber; 44 Rich Batchelor; 41 Alan Benes; 40 Andy Benes; 57 Mike Busby; 43 Dennis Eckersley; 48 Tony Fossas; 32 Rick Honeycutt; 29 Danny Jackson; 54 Eric Ludwick; 33 T. J. Mathews; 36 Mike Morgan; 31 Donovan Osborne; 49 Jeff Parrett; 46 Mark Petkovsek; 30 Todd Stottlemyre; 34 Tom Urbani	Catchers: 38 Pat Borders; 49 Mike DiFelice; 19 Tom Pagnozzi; Infielders: 18 Luis Alicea; 27 David Bell; 11 Royce Clayton; 8 Gary Gaetti; 22 Mike Gallego; 68 Aaron Holbert; 47 John Mabry; 12 Danny Sheaffer; 1 Ozzie Smith; 24 Dmitri Young	Outfielders: 55 Terry Bradshaw; 5 Ron Gant; 3 Brian Jordan; 16 Ray Lankford; 51 Willie McGee; 35 Miguel Mejia; 23 Mark Sweeney	Manager: 10 Tony La Russa; Coaches: 18 Dave Duncan (Pitching); 9 Mark DeJohn (Bullpen); 28 Ron Hassey (Bench); 25 George Hendrick (Hitting); 39 Dave McKay (First Base); 15 Tommie Reynolds (Third Base)

== Player stats ==
=== Batting ===
==== Starters by position ====
Note: Pos = Position; G = Games played; AB = At bats; H = Hits; Avg. = Batting average; HR = Home runs; RBI = Runs batted in

Pos	Player	G	AB	H	Avg.	HR	RBI
C	Tom Pagnozzi	119	407	110	.270	13	55
1B	John Mabry	151	543	161	.297	13	74
2B	Luis Alicea	129	380	98	.258	5	42
SS	Royce Clayton	129	491	136	.277	6	35
3B	Gary Gaetti	141	522	143	.274	23	80
LF	Ron Gant	122	419	103	.246	30	82
CF	Ray Lankford	149	545	150	.275	21	86
RF	Brian Jordan	140	513	159	.310	17	104

==== Other batters ====
Note: G = Games played; AB = At bats; H = Hits; Avg. = Batting average; HR = Home runs; RBI = Runs batted in

Player	G	AB	H	Avg.	HR	RBI
Willie McGee	123	309	95	.307	5	41
Ozzie Smith	82	227	64	.282	2	18
Danny Sheaffer	79	198	45	.227	2	20
Mark Sweeney	98	170	45	.265	3	22
David Bell	62	145	31	.214	1	9
Mike Gallego	51	143	30	.210	0	4
Pat Borders	26	69	22	.319	0	4
Dmitri Young	16	29	7	.241	0	2
Miguel Mejia	45	23	2	.087	0	0
Terry Bradshaw	15	21	7	.333	0	3
Mike DiFelice	4	7	2	.286	0	2
Aaron Holbert	1	3	0	.000	0	0

=== Pitching ===
==== Starting pitchers ====
Note: G = Games pitched; IP = Innings pitched; W = Wins; L = Losses; ERA = Earned run average; SO = Strikeouts

Player	G	IP	W	L	ERA	SO
Andy Benes	36	230.1	18	10	3.83	160
Todd Stottlemyre	34	223.1	14	11	3.87	194
Donovan Osborne	30	198.2	13	9	3.53	134
Alan Benes	34	191.0	13	10	4.90	131
Mike Morgan	18	103.0	4	8	5.24	55
Mike Busby	1	4.0	0	1	18.00	4
Brian Barber	1	3.0	0	0	15.00	1

==== Other pitchers ====
Note: G = Games pitched; IP = Innings pitched; W = Wins; L = Losses; ERA = Earned run average; SO = Strikeouts

Player	G	IP	W	L	ERA	SO
Mark Petkovsek	48	88.2	11	2	3.55	45
Danny Jackson	13	36.1	1	1	4.46	27
Tom Urbani	3	11.2	1	0	7.71	1
Eric Ludwick	6	10.0	0	1	9.00	12

==== Relief pitchers ====
Note: G = Games pitched; W = Wins; L = Losses; SV = Saves; ERA = Earned run average; SO = Strikeouts

Player	G	W	L	SV	ERA	SO
Dennis Eckersley	63	0	6	30	3.30	49
T.J. Mathews	67	2	6	6	3.01	80
Tony Fossas	65	0	4	2	2.68	36
Rick Honeycutt	61	2	1	4	2.85	30
Cory Bailey	51	5	2	0	3.00	38
Jeff Parrett	33	2	2	0	4.25	42
Rich Batchelor	11	2	0	0	1.20	11

== NLDS ==
St. Louis wins the series, 3-0

Game	Home	Score	Visitor	Score	Date	Series
1	St. Louis	3	San Diego	1	October 1	1-0 (STL)
2	St. Louis	5	San Diego	4	October 3	2-0 (STL)
3	San Diego	5	St. Louis	7	October 5	3-0 (STL)

== NLCS ==
=== Game 1 ===
October 9: Atlanta–Fulton County Stadium in Atlanta

Team	1	2	3	4	5	6	7	8	9	R	H	E
St. Louis	0	1	0	0	0	0	1	0	0	2	5	1
Atlanta	0	0	0	0	2	0	0	2	X	4	9	0
WP: John Smoltz (1-0) LP: Mark Petkovsek (0-1) Sv: Mark Wohlers (1); Home runs: STL: None; ATL: None

=== Game 2 ===
October 10: Atlanta–Fulton County Stadium in Atlanta

Team	1	2	3	4	5	6	7	8	9	R	H	E
St. Louis	1	0	2	0	0	0	5	0	0	8	11	2
Atlanta	0	0	2	0	0	1	0	0	0	3	5	2
WP: Todd Stottlemyre (1-0) LP: Greg Maddux (0-1); Home runs: STL: Gary Gaetti (1); ATL: Marquis Grissom (1)

=== Game 3 ===
October 12: Busch Stadium in St. Louis, Missouri

Team	1	2	3	4	5	6	7	8	9	R	H	E
Atlanta	1	0	0	0	0	0	0	1	0	2	8	1
St. Louis	2	0	0	0	0	1	0	0	X	3	7	0
WP: Donovan Osborne (1-0) LP: Tom Glavine (0-1) Sv: Dennis Eckersley (1); Home runs: ATL: None; STL: Ron Gant 2 (2)

=== Game 4 ===
October 13: Busch Stadium in St. Louis, Missouri

Team	1	2	3	4	5	6	7	8	9	R	H	E
Atlanta	0	1	0	0	0	2	0	0	0	3	9	1
St. Louis	0	0	0	0	0	0	3	1	X	4	5	0
WP: Dennis Eckersley (1-0) LP: Greg McMichael (0-1); Home runs: ATL: Mark Lemke (1), Ryan Klesko (1); STL: Brian Jordan (1)

=== Game 5 ===
October 14: Busch Stadium in St. Louis, Missouri

Team	1	2	3	4	5	6	7	8	9	R	H	E
Atlanta	5	2	0	3	1	0	0	1	2	14	22	0
St. Louis	0	0	0	0	0	0	0	0	0	0	7	0
WP: John Smoltz (2-0) LP: Todd Stottlemyre (1-1); Home runs: ATL: Fred McGriff (1), Javy López (1), STL: None

=== Game 6 ===
October 16: Atlanta–Fulton County Stadium in Atlanta

Team	1	2	3	4	5	6	7	8	9	R	H	E
St. Louis	0	0	0	0	0	0	0	1	0	1	6	1
Atlanta	0	1	0	0	1	0	0	1	X	3	7	0
WP: Greg Maddux (1-1) LP: Alan Benes (0-1) Sv: Mark Wohlers (2); Home runs: STL: None; ATL: None

=== Game 7 ===
October 17: Atlanta–Fulton County Stadium in Atlanta

Team	1	2	3	4	5	6	7	8	9	R	H	E
St. Louis	0	0	0	0	0	0	0	0	0	0	4	2
Atlanta	6	0	0	4	0	3	2	0	X	15	17	0
WP: Tom Glavine (1-1) LP: Donovan Osborne (1-1); Home runs: STL: None; ATL: Javy López (2), Andruw Jones (1), Fred McGriff (2)

== Awards and honors ==
- Tony La Russa, Associated Press Manager of the Year
- Ozzie Smith, All Star Game

== Farm system ==
Level	Team	League	Manager
AAA	Louisville Redbirds	American Association	Joe Pettini
AA	Arkansas Travelers	Texas League	Rick Mahler
A	St. Petersburg Cardinals	Florida State League	Chris Maloney
A	Peoria Chiefs	Midwest League	Roy Silver
A-Short Season	New Jersey Cardinals	New York–Penn League	Scott Melvin
Rookie	Johnson City Cardinals	Appalachian League	Steve Turco
