= 1996 National League Championship Series =

Team (Wins)	Managers	Season
Atlanta Braves (4)	Bobby Cox	96–66 (.593), GA: 8
St. Louis Cardinals (3)	Tony La Russa	88–74 (.543), GA: 6
- Dates: October 9–17
- MVP: Javy López (Atlanta)
- Umpires: Paul Runge, Mark Hirschbeck, Bob Davidson, Joe West, Jerry Crawford, Ed Montague

Broadcast
- Television: Fox
- TV announcers: Joe Buck, Tim McCarver, and Bob Brenly
- Radio: CBS
- Radio announcers: Jim Hunter and Jerry Coleman
- NLDS: Atlanta Braves over Los Angeles Dodgers (3–0); St. Louis Cardinals over San Diego Padres (3–0)

The 1996 National League Championship Series (NLCS) was a best-of-seven playoff series in Major League Baseball’s 1996 postseason pitting the NL East champion and defending World Series champion Atlanta Braves against the NL Central champion St. Louis Cardinals for the National League pennant. The Series began on October 9 and ended on October 17. The Braves held home-field advantage due to the predetermined rotation in place from 1995–1997 amongst division champions.

It was the second NLCS meeting of the two teams and first since 1982, which St. Louis won in a three-game sweep.

The Braves won in seven games, and doing so by becoming the eighth team in MLB history to win a best-of-seven postseason series after being down 3–1, and first to overcome such a deficit in the NLCS. They outscored the Cardinals, 32–1, over the final three games.

Bobby Cox became the first manager to be on both the winning and losing end of such a comeback in postseason history, having previously lost the 1985 American League Championship Series with the Toronto Blue Jays against the Kansas City Royals after winning three of the first four games. This would be followed by Terry Francona between his time with the Boston Red Sox and Cleveland Indians (winning in the 2004 ALCS & 2007 ALCS with Boston, and losing in the 2016 World Series with Cleveland).

The Braves would go on to lose to the New York Yankees in the World Series in six games.

== Summary ==
=== Atlanta Braves vs. St. Louis Cardinals ===
Atlanta won the series, 4–3.

Game	Date	Score	Location	Time	Attendance
1	October 9	St. Louis Cardinals – 2, Atlanta Braves – 4	Atlanta–Fulton County Stadium	2:35	48,686
2	October 10	St. Louis Cardinals – 8, Atlanta Braves – 3	Atlanta–Fulton County Stadium	2:53	52,067
3	October 12	Atlanta Braves – 2, St. Louis Cardinals – 3	Busch Stadium (II)	2:46	56,769
4	October 13	Atlanta Braves – 3, St. Louis Cardinals – 4	Busch Stadium (II)	3:17	56,764
5	October 14	Atlanta Braves – 14, St. Louis Cardinals – 0	Busch Stadium (II)	2:57	56,782
6	October 16	St. Louis Cardinals – 1, Atlanta Braves – 3	Atlanta–Fulton County Stadium	2:41	52,067
7	October 17	St. Louis Cardinals – 0, Atlanta Braves – 15	Atlanta–Fulton County Stadium	2:25	52,067

== Game summaries ==
=== Game 1 ===
October 9, 1996 8:07 pm (EDT) at Atlanta–Fulton County Stadium in Atlanta, Georgia 66 °F (19 °C), clear
Team	1	2	3	4	5	6	7	8	9	R	H	E
St. Louis	0	1	0	0	0	0	1	0	0	2	5	0
Atlanta	0	0	0	0	2	0	0	2	X	4	9	0
WP: John Smoltz (1–0) LP: Mark Petkovsek (0–1) Sv: Mark Wohlers (1); Attendance: 48,686; Boxscore

Game 1 was played in Atlanta with 24-game winner John Smoltz on the mound for the Braves versus Andy Benes for the Cardinals. Brian Jordan tripled and scored the first run of the series for St. Louis on a wild pitch in the second, but Mark Lemke singled in two runs in the fifth. St. Louis tied the game in the seventh on three consecutive leadoff singles by Gary Gaetti, John Mabry and Tom Pagnozzi, but Atlanta catcher Javy López gave Atlanta back the lead for good with a two-run bases-loaded single in the bottom of the eighth off T.J. Mathews, both runs charged to Mark Petkovsek. Mark Wohlers got the save after Smoltz threw eight innings. The Braves held on to a 4–2 victory.

=== Game 2 ===
October 10, 1996 8:07 pm (EDT) at Atlanta–Fulton County Stadium in Atlanta, Georgia 56 °F (13 °C), clear
Team	1	2	3	4	5	6	7	8	9	R	H	E
St. Louis	1	0	2	0	0	0	5	0	0	8	11	2
Atlanta	0	0	2	0	0	1	0	0	0	3	5	2
WP: Todd Stottlemyre (1–0) LP: Greg Maddux (0–1); Home runs: STL: Gary Gaetti (1); ATL: Marquis Grissom (1); Attendance: 52,067; Boxscore

The Braves sent Greg Maddux to the mound versus Todd Stottlemyre looking to go up two games to none on St. Louis. Royce Clayton singled to lead off the top of the first and scored on Ron Gant's one-out single aided by center fielder Marquis Grissom's error. The Cardinals made it 3–0 in the third on back-to-back two-out RBI doubles by Gant and Brian Jordan, but a two-run home run by Marquis Grissom in the bottom of the inning made the score 3–2. The Braves loaded the bases in the sixth on a single and two walks with one out when Ryan Klesko's RBI single tied the game. In the seventh inning, a throwing error by Chipper Jones on Mark Sweeney's ground ball, single and walked load the bases with no outs for the Cardinals. Ray Lankford's sacrifice fly put them up 4–3 and two outs later, Jordan was intentionally walked to load the bases before Gary Gaetti drove a pitch from Maddux over the fence for a grand slam home run, putting the Cardinals 8–3. Dennis Eckersley pitched the final 1 1/3 innings for the Cardinals and the series was evened at 1–1 as play moved to St. Louis. Only three of the eight runs Maddux allowed were earned.

=== Game 3 ===
October 12, 1996 3:17 pm (CDT) at Busch Stadium (II) in St. Louis, Missouri 72 °F (22 °C), sunny
Team	1	2	3	4	5	6	7	8	9	R	H	E
Atlanta	1	0	0	0	0	0	0	1	0	2	8	1
St. Louis	2	0	0	0	0	1	0	0	X	3	7	0
WP: Donovan Osborne (1–0) LP: Tom Glavine (0–1) Sv: Dennis Eckersley (1); Home runs: ATL: None; STL: Ron Gant 2 (2); Attendance: 56,769; Boxscore

The Braves struck first in Game 3 when Marquis Grissom singled to lead off the first, moved to second on a groundout, then to third on a wild pitch by Donovan Osborne before scoring on Chipper Jones's sacrifice fly, but in the bottom of the inning, Royce Clayton singled and Ron Gant's two-run home run off former teammate Tom Glavine put the Cardinals up 2–1. He also homered in the sixth off Glavine for the Cardinals' other run. The Braves loaded the bases with no outs on three straight singles off Osborne and Mark Petkovsek in the seventh, but scored only once on a Jermaine Dye sacrifice fly. They went quietly in the ninth to Dennis Eckersley, who earned a save, as St. Louis took a 2-1 series lead.

=== Game 4 ===
October 13, 1996 7:30 pm (CDT) at Busch Stadium (II) in St. Louis, Missouri 78 °F (26 °C), clear
Team	1	2	3	4	5	6	7	8	9	R	H	E
Atlanta	0	1	0	0	0	2	0	0	0	3	9	1
St. Louis	0	0	0	0	0	0	3	1	X	4	5	0
WP: Dennis Eckersley (1–0) LP: Greg McMichael (0–1); Home runs: ATL: Ryan Klesko (1), Mark Lemke (1); STL: Brian Jordan (1); Attendance: 56,764; Boxscore

Needing the win to help stave off an upset, the Braves struck first on a Ryan Klesko home run in the second off Andy Benes. Mark Lemke's leadoff home run in the sixth made it 2–0 Braves and after Chipper Jones doubled, Tony Fossas relieved Benes and walked Fred McGriff before Klesko grounded into a double play, moving Jones to third. After Javy López was intentionally walked, T.J. Mathews relieved Fossas and allowed an RBI single by Jermaine Dye. Denny Neagle was on the mound for Atlanta and pitched shutout ball until the seventh inning, when he allowed a two-out single to John Mabry and a walk to Tom Pagnozzi to end his night. Then Dmitri Young rocketed a pinch-hit triple off reliever Greg McMichael that scored two runs. After a walk to pinch-hitter Luis Alicea, Royce Clayton singled in the tying run. In the eighth inning, Brian Jordan homered off Braves reliever Greg McMichael. Down 4–3, the Braves again could not crack Dennis Eckersley, who pitched the final 1 1/3 innings for the win, striking out Terry Pendleton and Marquis Grissom to finish off the Braves.

=== Game 5 ===
October 14, 1996 6:12 pm (CDT) at Busch Stadium (II) in St. Louis, Missouri 82 °F (28 °C), clear
Team	1	2	3	4	5	6	7	8	9	R	H	E
Atlanta	5	2	0	3	1	0	0	1	2	14	22	0
St. Louis	0	0	0	0	0	0	0	0	0	0	7	0
WP: John Smoltz (2–0) LP: Todd Stottlemyre (1–1); Home runs: ATL: Javy López (1), Fred McGriff (1); STL: None; Attendance: 56,782; Boxscore

With their backs to the wall, the defending champion Braves struck back with a vengeance. The Braves knocked Cardinals starter Todd Stottlemyre out of the game early. In the first, Marquis Grissom hit a leadoff single followed by a Mark Lemke double before both scored on Chipper Jones's double. Jones then scored on Fred McGriff's single. Two outs later, Jermaine Dye singled before Jeff Blauser's two-run triple made it 5–0 Braves. Leading off the next inning, three consecutive singles made it 6–0 Braves and knocked Stottlemyre out of the game. Danny Jackson in relief allowed a two-out RBI single to Ryan Klesko. In the fourth with two on and two outs, consecutive RBI singles by John Smoltz, Grissom, and Lemke made it 10–0 Braves. Javy López's two-out home run next inning off Tony Fossas made it 11–0 Braves. In the eighth, Lopez doubled with one out and scored on Rafael Belliard's two-out single off Mark Petkovsek. Fred McGriff's two-run home run in the ninth off Rick Honeycutt made it 14–0 Braves. Behind 24-game winner John Smoltz and 22 hits (an LCS record), the Braves forced the series to return to Atlanta with Atlanta–Fulton County Stadium still scheduled for demolition over the fall and winter.

=== Game 6 ===
October 16, 1996 8:12 pm (EDT) at Atlanta–Fulton County Stadium in Atlanta, Georgia 72 °F (22 °C), clear
Team	1	2	3	4	5	6	7	8	9	R	H	E
St. Louis	0	0	0	0	0	0	0	1	0	1	6	1
Atlanta	0	1	0	0	1	0	0	1	X	3	7	0
WP: Greg Maddux (1–1) LP: Alan Benes (0–1) Sv: Mark Wohlers (2); Attendance: 52,067; Boxscore

After his rattling defeat in Game 2, Greg Maddux stepped up in Game 6 and outdueled Cardinals starter Alan Benes to keep Atlanta's comeback hopes alive. While Maddux mowed down the Cardinals, with some help from a great catch by center fielder Marquis Grissom, the Braves struck first in the second on Jermaine Dye's sacrifice fly with runners on second and third. In the fifth, Jeff Blauser was hit by a pitch, moved to second on a groundout and scored on Mark Lemke's single. Those would be the only runs Benes allowed in five solid innings, but was given very little support. A wild pitch by Mark Wohlers allowed Royce Clayton to score from third led to the Cardinals' only run of the game in the eighth with the run charged to Maddux, but the Braves got the run back in the bottom half on Rafael Belliard's RBI single off Todd Stottlemyre. Wohlers pitched a perfect ninth inning to earn the save, finish off the Cardinals, and to extend the Championship Series to its seventh game.

=== Game 7 ===
October 17, 1996 8:07 pm (EDT) at Atlanta–Fulton County Stadium in Atlanta, Georgia 71 °F (22 °C), clear
Team	1	2	3	4	5	6	7	8	9	R	H	E
St. Louis	0	0	0	0	0	0	0	0	0	0	4	2
Atlanta	6	0	0	4	0	3	2	0	X	15	17	0
WP: Tom Glavine (1–1) LP: Donovan Osborne (1–1); Home runs: STL: None; ATL: Javy López (2), Andruw Jones (1), Fred McGriff (2); Attendance: 52,067; Boxscore

The Braves clinched the NLCS with a blowout Game 7 win. In the first with runners on second and third and one out off Donovan Osborne, Fred McGriff hit into a fielder's choice to score the first run of the game. After a walk, consecutive RBI singles by Jermaine Dye and Andruw Jones made it 3–0 Braves. After Jeff Blauser was hit by a pitch to load the bases, Tom Glavine cleared them with a triple, knocking Osborne out of the game after less than an inning while Glavine pitched seven shutout innings, allowing only three hits. In the fourth, the Cardinals game 1 and 4 starter, Andy Benes, walked two straight batters with one out before McGriff drove them both in with a single aided by an error, then Javy López's home run made it 10–0 Braves. McGriff tripled to lead off the sixth off Mark Petkovsek, then scored on Lopez's double before Jones's one-out two run home run made it 13–0 Braves. McGriff's two-run home run in the seventh off Rick Honeycutt capped the scoring at 15–0 Braves. Mike Bielecki and Steve Avery pitched scoreless eighth and ninth innings, respectively as the Braves advanced to the World Series for the second straight year.

Javy López was named the MVP for having a role in each Atlanta victory. In Game 1, he snapped a 2–2 tie with a two-run single; in Game 5, he hit a home run, two doubles, and scored four runs; in Game 6, he singled and scored after being hit by a pitch; and in Game 7, he went two for four with a double, a home run, three RBIs, and scored three runs. Overall, he batted a torrid .545 (13 for 24) with eight runs scored, five doubles, two home runs and six RBIs in the Championship Series.

== Composite box ==
1996 NLCS (4–3): Atlanta Braves over St. Louis Cardinals

Team	1	2	3	4	5	6	7	8	9	R	H	E
Atlanta Braves	12	4	2	7	4	6	2	5	2	44	77	4
St. Louis Cardinals	3	1	2	0	0	1	9	2	0	18	45	5
Total attendance: 375,202 Average attendance: 53,600

The Cardinals were outscored 32–1 from Games 5–7. The Braves +26 run differential for the entire series was the second largest in a postseason series.

== Aftermath ==
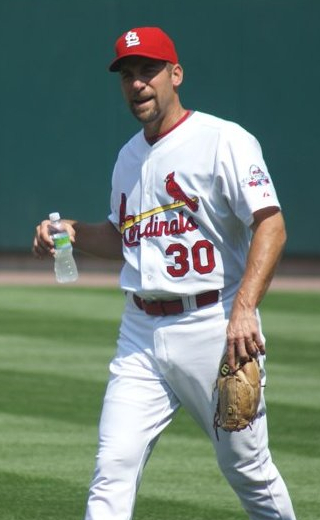
Smoltz with the Cardinals during the last season of his career in 2009

Game 7 of this NLCS would be the last time the Braves won a winner-take-all postseason until the 2026 NL Wild Card Series. In between, they had lost six straight such games with the 2002 NLDS, 2003 NLDS, 2004 NLDS, the 2012 NL Wild Card Game, the 2019 NLDS, and the 2020 NLCS.

After a bitter feud between Ozzie Smith and Tony La Russa that developed in spring training due to reduced playing time, Ozzie Smith announced his retirement on June 19, 1996, making Game 7 the last game of his 18-year career. Smith was elected to the National Baseball Hall of Fame in his first year of eligibility in 2002. He was also inducted into the St. Louis Cardinals Hall of Fame in the inaugural class of 2014. In 2021, MLB.com called Smith's walk-off home run in Game 5 of the 1985 NLCS the second greatest moment in Busch Stadium.

John Smoltz would later end his Hall of Fame career with the St. Louis Cardinals in 2009.

The two teams met again three other times since 1996 in the postseason — during the 2000 National League Division Series, 2012 National League Wild Card Game, and 2019 National League Division Series — with the Cardinals winning all three match-ups. The Cardinals would avenge their 1996 Game 7 blowout loss against the Braves by returning the favor and blowing out the Braves by 12 runs in the decisive Game 5 of the 2019 NLDS. This was highlighted by a ten run first inning, which set a Major League Baseball record for first-inning runs in a postseason game, and tied the Major League Baseball record for the most runs in any inning in a postseason game (coincidentally, these records would be surpassed again against the Braves by the Dodgers in Game 3 of the 2020 NLCS with an 11-run first inning).
