= 1996 Atlanta Braves season =

1996 Atlanta Braves
- National League champions National League East champions
- League: National League
- Division: East
- Ballpark: Fulton County Stadium
- City: Atlanta
- Record: 96–66 (.593)
- Divisional place: 1st
- Owners: Ted Turner
- General managers: John Schuerholz
- Managers: Bobby Cox
- Television: WTBS; TBS Superstation (Pete Van Wieren, Skip Caray, Don Sutton, Joe Simpson); SportSouth (Tim Brando, Ernie Johnson, Ernie Johnson, Jr.)
- Radio: WSB (AM) (Pete Van Wieren, Skip Caray, Don Sutton, Joe Simpson)

The 1996 Atlanta Braves season was the 126th season in the history of the franchise and 31st season in the city of Atlanta. They had a regular season record of 96–66 and reached the World Series, where they lost to the underdog New York Yankees in six games, failing to defend their championship in 1995. Heavily favored and seen as one of the greatest Braves teams in history and despite taking a 2–0 lead, the Braves unexpectedly lost the next 4 games. This World Series appearance was their fourth appearance in the last 5 years as a franchise, excluding the strike-abbreviated 1994 season. Atlanta won its seventh division title (second in the National League East, the other five in the NL West) and its fifth in six years. In the previous round, Atlanta completed a miraculous comeback. After trailing in the NLCS to St. Louis three games to one, Atlanta outscored St. Louis 32–1 in games five through seven to complete the comeback.

The 1996 season was the Braves' final season at Atlanta–Fulton County Stadium, with Game 5 of the 1996 World Series being the last game played in the stadium. Atlanta–Fulton County Stadium also served as a venue during the 1996 Summer Olympics held in Atlanta, prompting the Braves to go on an extended road trip as their stadium hosted the baseball competition. Following the closing ceremonies of the 1996 Summer Paralympics, Centennial Olympic Stadium was reconstructed as planned into Turner Field, which would become the home of the Braves for the next 20 seasons. This was also the final season for Ted Turner as the owner of the Braves. The team would be acquired (along with TBS) by Time Warner in October 1996, following the World Series.

Atlanta had an excellent pitching staff, which set an MLB record with 1,245 strikeouts, besting the 1969 Houston Astros. The record was surpassed by 4 teams in 2001.

== Offseason ==
- January 3, 1996: Jerome Walton was signed as a free agent.
- January 9, 1996: Mike Kelly was traded to the Cincinnati Reds for a player to be named later and Chad Fox. The Reds sent Ray King (June 11, 1996) to the Braves to complete the trade.
- March 31, 1996: Mike Bielecki was signed as a free agent.

== Regular season ==
=== Season standings ===
NL East
Team	W	L	Pct.	GB	Home	Road
Atlanta Braves	96	66	.593	—	56‍–‍25	40‍–‍41
Montreal Expos	88	74	.543	8	50‍–‍31	38‍–‍43
Florida Marlins	80	82	.494	16	52‍–‍29	28‍–‍53
New York Mets	71	91	.438	25	42‍–‍39	29‍–‍52
Philadelphia Phillies	67	95	.414	29	35‍–‍46	32‍–‍49

=== Record vs. opponents ===
1996 National League record Source: MLB Standings Grid – 1996
Team	ATL	CHC	CIN	COL	FLA	HOU	LAD	MON	NYM	PHI	PIT	SD	SF	STL
Atlanta	—	7–5	7–5	5–7	6–7	6–6	5–7	10–3	7–6	9–4	9–3	9–4	7–5	9–4
Chicago	5–7	—	5–8	5–7	6–6	5–8	8–5	6–6	7–5	7–6	4–9	6–6	7–5	5–8
Cincinnati	5–7	8–5	—	7–6	3–9	7–6	4–8	3–9	6–6	10–2	5–8	9–3	9–4	5–8
Colorado	7–5	7–5	6–7	—	5–8	8–5	6–7	3–9	7–5	6–6	7–5	8–5	5–8	8–4
Florida	7–6	6–6	9–3	8–5	—	7–5	6–7	5–8	7–6	6–7	5–7	3–9	5–7	6–6
Houston	6–6	8–5	6–7	5–8	5–7	—	6–6	4–9	8–4	10–2	8–5	6–6	8–4	2–11
Los Angeles	7–5	5–8	8–4	7–6	7–6	6–6	—	9–3	8–4	7–6	6–6	5–8	7–6	8–4
Montreal	3–10	6–6	9–3	9–3	8–5	9–4	3–9	—	7–6	6–7	7–5	4–8	9–4	8–4
New York	6–7	5–7	6–6	5–7	6–7	4–8	4–8	6–7	—	7–6	8–5	3–10	6–6	5–7
Philadelphia	4–9	6–7	2–10	6–6	7–6	2–10	6–7	7–6	6–7	—	7–5	4–8	6–6	4–8
Pittsburgh	3–9	9–4	8–5	5–7	7–5	5–8	6–6	5–7	5–8	5–7	—	4–9	8–4	3–10
San Diego	4–9	6–6	3–9	5–8	9–3	6–6	8–5	8–4	10–3	8–4	9–4	—	11–2	4–8
San Francisco	5–7	5–7	4–9	8–5	7–5	4–8	6–7	4–9	6–6	6–6	4–8	2–11	—	7–6
St. Louis	4–9	8–5	8–5	4–8	6–6	11–2	4–8	4–8	7–5	8–4	10–3	8–4	6–7	—

=== Game log ===
1996 Game Log: 96–66 (Home: 56–25; Away: 40–41)
April: 16–11 (Home: 8–6; Away: 8–5)

#	Date	Opponent	Score	Win	Loss	Save	Attendance	Record
1	April 1	Giants	10–8	**Maddux** (1–0)	Leiter	**Borbon** (1)	48,961	1–0
2	April 3	Giants	15–2	**Glavine** (1–0)	VanLandingham	—	28,728	2–0
3	April 4	Giants	1–7	Watson	**Smoltz** (0–1)	—	30,271	2–1
4	April 5	Cardinals	4–5 (14)	Bailey	**Bielecki** (0–1)	Eckersley	31,071	2–2
5	April 6	Cardinals	2–3 (12)	Parrett	**Clontz** (0–1)	—	34,649	2–3
6	April 7	Cardinals	13–3	**Schmidt** (1–0)	Busby	—	28,498	3–3
7	April 8	@ Dodgers	0–1	Nomo	**Glavine** (1–1)	—	53,180	3–4
8	April 9	@ Dodgers	3–1	**Smoltz** (1–1)	Astacio	**Wohlers** (1)	35,570	4–4
9	April 10	@ Dodgers	2–9	Candiotti	**Avery** (0–1)	—	48,194	4–5
10	April 11	@ Padres	1–2	Ashby	**Maddux** (1–1)	Hoffman	19,047	4–6
11	April 12	@ Padres	5–3	**Schmidt** (2–0)	Bergman	**Wohlers** (2)	25,747	5–6
12	April 13	@ Padres	2–6	Hamilton	**Glavine** (1–2)	Bochtler	45,250	5–7
13	April 14	@ Padres	4–0	**Smoltz** (2–1)	Valenzuela	—	45,014	6–7
14	April 16	Marlins	5–2	**Avery** (1–1)	Brown	**Wohlers** (3)	26,625	7–7
15	April 17	Marlins	4–2	**Maddux** (2–1)	Burkett	**Wohlers** (4)	28,884	8–7
16	April 18	Marlins	3–5	Hammond	**Glavine** (1–3)	Nen	25,300	8–8
17	April 19	Padres	7–1	**Smoltz** (3–1)	Hamilton	—	27,375	9–8
18	April 20	Padres	6–5	**McMichael** (1–0)	Bochtler	**Wohlers** (5)	31,893	10–8
19	April 21	Padres	1–2 (15)	Worrell	**Thobe** (0–1)	Bochtler	28,829	10–9
20	April 22	Dodgers	4–1	**Maddux** (3–1)	Candiotti	—	33,080	11–9
21	April 23	Dodgers	2–3	Osuna	**Clontz** (0–2)	Worrell	30,475	11–10
22	April 24	@ Giants	8–3	**Smoltz** (4–1)	Watson	—	13,296	12–10
23	April 25	@ Giants	0–8	Gardner	**Schmidt** (2–1)	—	12,436	12–11
24	April 26	@ Cardinals	6–1	**Avery** (2–1)	Benes	—	34,598	13–11
25	April 27	@ Cardinals	7–2	**Maddux** (4–1)	Osborne	—	20,757	14–11
26	April 29	@ Cardinals	4–1	**Glavine** (2–3)	Stottlemyre	**Wohlers** (6)	25,452	15–11
27	April 30	@ Astros	7–5	**Smoltz** (5–1)	Jones	**McMichael** (1)	17,795	16–11

May: 19–6 (Home: 12–3; Away: 7–3)

#	Date	Opponent	Score	Win	Loss	Save	Attendance	Record
28	May 1	@ Astros	0–3	Hampton	**Avery** (2–2)	—	18,546	16–12
29	May 3	Phillies	3–6	Mulholland	**Maddux** (4–2)	Bottalico	39,697	16–13
30	May 4	Phillies	6–3	**McMichael** (2–0)	Ryan	**Clontz** (1)	44,429	17–13
31	May 5	Phillies	11–8	**Smoltz** (6–1)	Williams	—	35,471	18–13
32	May 6	Rockies	4–1	**Avery** (3–2)	Thompson	—	28,725	19–13
33	May 7	Rockies	6–5 (10)	**Clontz** (1–2)	Leskanic	—	29,976	20–13
34	May 8	Rockies	5–1	**Glavine** (3–3)	Reynoso	—	29,363	21–13
35	May 10	@ Phillies	11–0	**Smoltz** (7–1)	Mulholland	—	27,068	22–13
36	May 11	@ Phillies	11–3	**Avery** (4–2)	Mimbs	—	22,823	23–13
37	May 12	@ Phillies	0–6	Grace	**Maddux** (4–3)	—	32,314	23–14
38	May 13	Pirates	9–3	**Glavine** (4–3)	Darwin	—	28,583	24–14
39	May 14	Pirates	7–3	**Smoltz** (8–1)	Wagner	—	28,175	25–14
40	May 15	Pirates	0–3	Neagle	**Avery** (4–3)	—	30,917	25–15
41	May 17	Reds	8–2	**Maddux** (5–3)	Smiley	—	40,612	26–15
42	May 18	Reds	2–1	**Clontz** (2–2)	Ruffin	**Wohlers** (7)	49,553	27–15
43	May 19	Reds	9–5	**Smoltz** (9–1)	Schourek	**Wohlers** (8)	41,153	28–15
44	May 20	Cubs	18–1	**Avery** (5–3)	Castillo	—	29,984	29–15
45	May 21	Cubs	2–4	Telemaco	**Wohlers** (0–1)	Patterson	31,045	29–16
46	May 22	Cubs	9–4	**Glavine** (5–3)	Bullinger	—	33,186	30–16
47	May 24	@ Pirates	5–3	**Smoltz** (10–1)	Darwin	**Wohlers** (9)	20,238	31–16
48	May 25	@ Pirates	2–6	Neagle	**Avery** (5–4)	—	29,273	31–17
49	May 26	@ Pirates	6–3 (13)	**Wade** (1–0)	Miceli	**Bielecki** (1)	33,085	32–17
50	May 27	@ Cubs	9–1	**Glavine** (6–3)	Telemaco	—	33,070	33–17
51	May 29	@ Cubs	2–0	**Smoltz** (11–1)	Trachsel	—	30,601	34–17
52	May 31	@ Reds	9–1	**Avery** (6–4)	Schourek	—	33,455	35–17

June: 15–13 (Home: 11–6; Away: 4–7)

#	Date	Opponent	Score	Win	Loss	Save	Attendance	Record
53	June 1	@ Reds	2–3	Portugal	**Maddux** (5–4)	Brantley	34,023	35–18
54	June 2	@ Reds	6–2	**Glavine** (7–3)	Smiley	—	23,482	36–18
55	June 3	Mets	5–4	**Clontz** (3–2)	Macdonald	**Wohlers** (10)	30,162	37–18
56	June 4	Mets	6–12	Wilson	**Schmidt** (2–2)	—	32,199	37–19
57	June 5	Mets	8–6	**McMichael** (3–0)	Mlicki	**Wohlers** (11)	31,998	38–19
58	June 7	@ Rockies	8–19	Painter	**Bielecki** (0–2)	—	48,027	38–20
59	June 8	@ Rockies	12–13	Holmes	**McMichael** (3–1)	Ruffin	48,015	38–21
60	June 9	@ Rockies	8–3	**Smoltz** (12–1)	Thompson	—	48,036	39–21
61	June 10	@ Mets	3–8	Jones	**Avery** (6–5)	—	17,439	39–22
62	June 11	@ Mets	4–3 (13)	**Borbon** (1–0)	Byrd	**Wade** (1)	19,256	40–22
63	June 12	@ Mets	2–3	Clark	**Maddux** (5–5)	Franco	18,896	40–23
64	June 13	Dodgers	3–6	Valdez	**Glavine** (7–4)	Worrell	39,463	40–24
65	June 14	Dodgers	3–1	**Smoltz** (13–1)	Astacio	**Wohlers** (12)	45,389	41–24
66	June 15	Dodgers	2–6	Nomo	**Avery** (6–6)	Worrell	49,726	41–25
67	June 16	Dodgers	2–3	Candiotti	**Schmidt** (2–3)	Worrell	44,784	41–26
68	June 17	Padres	9–3	**Maddux** (6–5)	Bergman	—	32,934	42–26
69	June 18	Padres	5–3	**Clontz** (4–2)	Hamilton	**Wohlers** (13)	32,730	43–26
70	June 19	Padres	5–1	**Smoltz** (14–1)	Tewksbury	—	34,823	44–26
71	June 21	Giants	8–7 (11)	**Wade** (2–0)	Beck	—	38,432	45–26
72	June 22	Giants	6–0	**Maddux** (7–5)	Gardner	—	49,365	46–26
73	June 23	Giants	1–0	**Glavine** (8–4)	Fernandez	**Wohlers** (14)	35,645	47–26
74	June 24	Cardinals	2–9	Benes	**Smoltz** (14–2)	—	31,971	47–27
75	June 25	Cardinals	4–3	**Schmidt** (3–3)	Stottlemyre	**Wohlers** (15)	30,942	48–27
76	June 26	Cardinals	7–11	Benes	**Avery** (6–7)	—	31,191	48–28
77	June 27	Cardinals	3–0	**Maddux** (8–5)	Morgan	**Wohlers** (16)	32,243	49–28
78	June 28	@ Marlins	0–2	Leiter	**Glavine** (8–5)	Nen	30,661	49–29
79	June 29	@ Marlins	3–5	Rapp	**Smoltz** (14–3)	—	40,952	49–30
80	June 30	@ Marlins	5–4	**Clontz** (5–2)	Burkett	**Wohlers** (17)	34,023	50–30

July: 15–11 (Home: 7–3; Away: 8–8)

#	Date	Opponent	Score	Win	Loss	Save	Attendance	Record
81	July 1	@ Expos	7–2	**Avery** (7–7)	Rueter	—	34,116	51–30
82	July 2	@ Expos	1–5	Cormier	**Maddux** (8–6)	—	20,075	51–31
83	July 3	@ Expos	3–1	**Glavine** (9–5)	Scott	**Wohlers** (18)	26,837	52–31
84	July 4	Astros	2–5	Reynolds	**Smoltz** (14–4)	Hernandez	49,060	52–32
85	July 5	Astros	1–7	Kile	**Schmidt** (3–4)	—	36,896	52–33
86	July 6	Astros	4–2	**Bielecki** (1–2)	Hampton	—	41,619	53–33
87	July 7	Astros	9–1	**Maddux** (9–6)	Wall	—	28,716	54–33
88	July 11	Marlins	8–9	Burkett	**Avery** (7–8)	Nen	33,208	54–34
89	July 12	Marlins	6–3	**Glavine** (10–5)	Leiter	**Wohlers** (19)	32,517	55–34
90	July 13	Marlins	3–0	**Smoltz** (15–4)	Brown	—	36,953	56–34
91	July 14	Marlins	15–10	**McMichael** (4–1)	Perez	—	31,134	57–34
92	July 15	Expos	5–4	**Maddux** (10–6)	Manuel	**Wohlers** (20)	32,708	58–34
93	July 16	Expos	3–2	**Wohlers** (1–1)	Scott	—	31,334	59–34
94	July 18	@ Astros	3–2	**Smoltz** (16–4)	Jones	**Wohlers** (21)	35,822	60–34
95	July 19	@ Astros	6–7	Kile	**Woodall** (0–1)	Wagner	39,090	60–35
96	July 20	@ Astros	1–2	Wagner	**Maddux** (10–7)	—	49,674	60–36
97	July 21	@ Astros	3–4 (10)	Hernandez	**McMichael** (4–2)	—	45,561	60–37
98	July 22	@ Cardinals	8–6	**McMichael** (5–2)	Mathews	**Wohlers** (22)	36,215	61–37
99	July 23	@ Cardinals	3–2	**Smoltz** (17–4)	Stottlemyre	**Wohlers** (23)	35,520	62–37
100	July 24	@ Cardinals	4–1	**Wade** (3–0)	Benes	**McMichael** (2)	35,411	63–37
101	July 25	@ Giants	3–4	Watson	**Maddux** (10–8)	Beck	16,871	63–38
102	July 26	@ Giants	2–1	**Glavine** (11–5)	Leiter	**Wohlers** (24)	17,560	64–38
103	July 27	@ Giants	5–7	Gardner	**Woodall** (0–2)	Beck	38,761	64–39
104	July 28	@ Giants	3–10	Estes	**Smoltz** (17–5)	Beck	34,525	64–40
105	July 30	@ Padres	1–2	Valenzuela	**Maddux** (10–9)	Hoffman	24,110	64–41
106	July 31	@ Padres	7–4	**Glavine** (12–5)	Tewksbury	**Wohlers** (25)	24,254	65–41

August: 19–10 (Home: 10–5; Away: 9–5)

#	Date	Opponent	Score	Win	Loss	Save	Attendance	Record
107	August 1	@ Padres	3–2	**Bielecki** (2–2)	Worrell	**Wohlers** (26)	24,089	66–41
108	August 2	@ Dodgers	1–2	Radinsky	**Smoltz** (17–6)	Guthrie	49,012	66–42
109	August 3	@ Dodgers	5–3 (18)	**Woodall** (1–2)	Martinez	—	42,575	67–42
110	August 4	@ Dodgers	6–4	**Borbon** (2–0)	Guthrie	**Wohlers** (27)	45,903	68–42
111	August 6	Phillies	10–4	**Bielecki** (3–2)	Springer	—	32,036	69–42
112	August 7	Phillies	14–1 (8)	**Smoltz** (18–6)	Munoz	—	29,920	70–42
113	August 8	Phillies	1–4	Beech	**Maddux** (10–10)	Bottalico	32,401	70–43
114	August 9	Rockies	4–6	Wright	**Glavine** (12–6)	Ruffin	41,275	70–44
115	August 10	Rockies	7–9 (10)	Reed	**Wohlers** (1–2)	Ruffin	46,064	70–45
116	August 11	Rockies	4–1	**Smoltz** (19–6)	Freeman	**Wohlers** (28)	32,961	71–45
117	August 13	@ Phillies	2–0	**Maddux** (11–10)	Hunter	—	—	72–45
118	August 13	@ Phillies	5–2	**Hartgraves** (1–0)	Beech	**Wohlers** (29)	25,196	73–45
119	August 14	@ Phillies	1–4	West	**Glavine** (12–7)	Bottalico	28,206	73–46
120	August 15	@ Phillies	8–5	**Wade** (4–0)	Schilling	—	28,011	74–46
121	August 16	Pirates	5–4	**Smoltz** (20–6)	Neagle	**Wohlers** (30)	39,210	75–46
122	August 17	Pirates	7–1	**Bielecki** (4–2)	Ruebel	—	49,024	76–46
123	August 18	Pirates	2–1 (14)	**Borowski** (1–0)	Cordova	—	31,587	77–46
124	August 20	Reds	4–1	**Glavine** (13–7)	Burba	**Wohlers** (31)	32,658	78–46
125	August 21	Reds	4–3	**Borbon** (3–0)	Brantley	—	29,213	79–46
126	August 22	Reds	2–3 (13)	Carrasco	**Borowski** (1–1)	Brantley	31,729	79–47
127	August 23	Cubs	4–3	**Maddux** (12–10)	Trachsel	**Wohlers** (32)	38,210	80–47
128	August 24	Cubs	6–5	**Clontz** (6–2)	Casian	—	46,804	81–47
129	August 25	Cubs	2–3	Foster	**Wohlers** (1–3)	Wendell	35,176	81–48
130	August 27	@ Pirates	2–3	Neagle	**Smoltz** (20–7)	Plesac	14,603	81–49
131	August 28	@ Pirates	9–4	**Wade** (5–0)	Loaiza	—	14,591	82–49
132	August 29	@ Pirates	5–1	**Maddux** (13–10)	Lieber	**Wohlers** (33)	12,101	83–49
133	August 30	@ Cubs	2–3	Foster	**Glavine** (13–8)	Patterson	—	83–50
134	August 30	@ Cubs	6–5	**Borowski** (2–1)	Bottenfield	**Wohlers** (34)	31,548	84–50
135	August 31	@ Cubs	0–12	Castillo	**Neagle** (0–1)	Adams	38,691	84–51

September: 12–15 (Home: 8–2; Away: 4–13)

#	Date	Opponent	Score	Win	Loss	Save	Attendance	Record
136	September 1	@ Cubs	1–2 (12)	Campbell	**Borowski** (2–2)	—	40,192	84–52
137	September 2	@ Reds	6–7	Shaw	**McMichael** (5–3)	Brantley	20,879	84–53
138	September 3	@ Reds	1–5	Burba	**Bielecki** (4–3)	Shaw	18,844	84–54
139	September 4	@ Reds	6–12	Salkeld	**Glavine** (13–9)	—	19,532	84–55
140	September 6	Mets	8–7	**Wohlers** (2–3)	Henry	—	37,660	85–55
141	September 7	Mets	6–1	**Smoltz** (21–7)	Jones	—	47,130	86–55
142	September 8	Mets	2–6	Clark	**Maddux** (13–11)	—	39,045	86–56
143	September 10	@ Rockies	8–9	Holmes	**Clontz** (6–3)	Ruffin	48,051	86–57
144	September 11	@ Rockies	5–6	Wright	**Neagle** (0–2)	Swift	48,091	86–58
145	September 12	@ Rockies	8–16	Burke	**Smoltz** (21–8)	—	48,052	86–59
146	September 13	@ Mets	4–6	Dipoto	**Borowski** (2–3)	Wallace	17,331	86–60
147	September 14	@ Mets	5–6 (12)	Wallace	**Borowski** (2–4)	—	22,857	86–61
148	September 15	@ Mets	3–2	**Glavine** (14–9)	Wilson	**Wohlers** (35)	23,718	87–61
149	September 16	@ Mets	5–2	**Neagle** (1–2)	Harnisch	—	14,980	88–61
150	September 17	Astros	5–4	**Smoltz** (22–8)	Kile	**Wohlers** (36)	32,109	89–61
151	September 18	Astros	6–2	**Maddux** (14–11)	Hampton	—	29,885	90–61
152	September 19	Expos	1–5	Urbina	**Wohlers** (2–4)	—	37,193	90–62
153	September 20	Expos	3–2	**Glavine** (15–9)	Leiper	**Wohlers** (37)	46,260	91–62
154	September 21	Expos	5–4	**Neagle** (2–2)	Daal	**Wohlers** (38)	49,285	92–62
155	September 22	Expos	8–2	**Smoltz** (23–8)	Fassero	—	49,238	93–62
156	September 23	Expos	3–1	**Maddux** (15–11)	Leiter	**Bielecki** (2)	49,083	94–62
157	September 24	@ Marlins	1–12	Rapp	**Avery** (7–9)	—	18,245	94–63
158	September 25	@ Marlins	0–3	Brown	**Glavine** (15–10)	Nen	29,178	94–64
159	September 26	@ Marlins	1–7	Leiter	**Neagle** (2–3)	—	25,553	94–65
160	September 27	@ Expos	6–4	**Smoltz** (24–8)	Fassero	**Wohlers** (39)	33,133	95–65
161	September 28	@ Expos	4–0	**Woodall** (2–2)	Leiter	—	34,125	96–65
162	September 29	@ Expos	3–6	Alvarez	**Avery** (7–10)	Rojas	30,646	96–66

Legend: = Win = Loss
Bold = Braves team member

=== Postseason Game log ===
1996 Postseason Game Log
National League Division Series: 3–0

#	Date	Opponent	Score	Win	Loss	Save	Attendance	Record
1	October 2	@ Dodgers	2–1 (10)	**Smoltz** (1–0)	Osuna (0–1)	**Wohlers** (1)	47,428	1–0
2	October 3	@ Dodgers	3–2	**Maddux** (1–0)	Valdez (0–1)	**Wohlers** (2)	51,916	2–0
3	October 5	Dodgers	5–2	**Glavine** (1–0)	Nomo (0–1)	**Wohlers** (3)	52,529	3–0

National League Championship Series: 4–3

#	Date	Opponent	Score	Win	Loss	Save	Attendance	Record
1	October 9	Cardinals	4–2	**Smoltz** (1–0)	Petkovsek (0–1)	**Wohlers** (1)	48,686	1–0
2	October 10	Cardinals	3–8	Stottlemyre (1–0)	**Maddux** (0–1)	—	52,067	1–1
3	October 12	@ Cardinals	2–3	Osborne (1–0)	**Glavine** (0–1)	Eckersley (1)	56,769	1–2
4	October 13	@ Cardinals	3–4	Eckersley (1–0)	**McMichael** (0–1)	—	56,764	1–3
5	October 14	@ Cardinals	14–0	**Smoltz** (2–0)	Stottlemyre (1–1)	—	56,782	2–3
6	October 16	Cardinals	3–1	**Maddux** (1–1)	Benes (0–1)	**Wohlers** (2)	52,067	3–3
7	October 17	Cardinals	15–0	**Glavine** (1–1)	Osborne (1–1)	—	52,067	4–3

World Series: 2–4

#	Date	Opponent	Score	Win	Loss	Save	Attendance	Record
1	October 20	@ Yankees	12–1	**Smoltz** (1–0)	Pettitte (0–1)	—	56,365	1–0
2	October 21	@ Yankees	4–0	**Maddux** (1–0)	Key (0–1)	—	56,340	2–0
3	October 22	Yankees	2–5	Cone (1–0)	**Glavine** (0–1)	Wetteland (1)	51,843	2–1
4	October 23	Yankees	6–8 (10)	Lloyd (1–0)	**Avery** (0–1)	Wetteland (2)	51,881	2–2
5	October 24	Yankees	0–1	Pettitte (1–1)	**Smoltz** (1–1)	Wetteland (3)	51,881	2–3
6	October 26	@ Yankees	2–3	Key (1–1)	**Maddux** (1–1)	Wetteland (4)	56,375	2–4

=== Detailed records ===
National League
Opponent	W	L	WP	RS	RA
NL East
**Atlanta Braves**					
Florida Marlins	6	7	0.462	54	64
Montreal Expos	10	3	0.769	52	38
New York Mets	7	6	0.538	61	66
Philadelphia Phillies	9	4	0.692	83	46
Total	32	20	0.615	250	214
NL Central
Chicago Cubs	7	5	0.583	61	43
Cincinnati Reds	7	5	0.583	59	45
Houston Astros	6	6	0.500	47	44
Pittsburgh Pirates	9	3	0.750	59	35
St. Louis Cardinals	9	4	0.692	67	47
Total	38	23	0.623	293	214
NL West
Colorado Rockies	5	7	0.417	79	89
Los Angeles Dodgers	5	7	0.417	33	40
San Diego Padres	9	4	0.692	56	34
San Francisco Giants	7	5	0.583	62	57
Total	26	23	0.531	230	220
Season Total	96	66	0.593	773	648

Month	Games	Won	Lost	Win %	RS	RA
April	27	16	11	0.593	126	91
May	25	19	6	0.760	154	76
June	28	15	13	0.536	132	140
July	26	15	11	0.577	116	103
August	29	19	10	0.655	131	99
September	27	12	15	0.444	114	139
Total	162	96	66	0.593	773	648

	Games	Won	Lost	Win %	RS	RA
Home	81	56	25	0.691	434	300
Away	81	40	41	0.494	339	348
Total	162	96	66	0.593	773	648

=== Opening Day starters ===
- Jeff Blauser
- Marquis Grissom
- David Justice
- Ryan Klesko
- Mark Lemke
- Javy López
- Greg Maddux
- Fred McGriff
- Mike Mordecai

=== Notable transactions ===
- June 4, 1996: Marcus Giles was drafted by the Braves in the 53rd round of the 1996 MLB draft. He signed May 26, 1997. Other notable draft picks who signed with the Braves include Mark DeRosa, Jason Marquis, and Joe Nelson.
- June 24: Mark Whiten signed as a free agent with the Braves.
- August 13: Terry Pendleton was traded by the Florida Marlins to the Braves for Roosevelt Brown.
- August 14: Mark Whiten was traded by the Braves to the Seattle Mariners for Roger Blanco.
- August 17: Luis Polonia was signed as a free agent with the Braves.
- August 28: The Pittsburgh Pirates traded Denny Neagle to the Braves for Ron Wright, Corey Pointer, and a player to be named later. On August 30, Atlanta sent Jason Schmidt to Pittsburgh to complete the trade.

=== Roster ===
1996 Atlanta Braves
**Roster**
**Pitchers**: 33 Steve Avery; 26 Mike Bielecki; 51 Pedro Borbón, Jr.; 50 Joe Borowski; 52 Brad Clontz; 47 Tom Glavine; 34 Dean Hartgraves; 32 Kevin Lomon; 31 Greg Maddux; 38 Greg McMichael; 15 Denny Neagle; 46 Jason Schmidt; 49 Carl Schutz; 29 John Smoltz; 49 Tom Thobe; 36 Terrell Wade; 43 Mark Wohlers; 48 Brad Woodall	**Catchers**: 30 Joe Ayrault; 8 Javy López; 12 Eddie Pérez; **Infielders**: 2 Rafael Belliard; 4 Jeff Blauser; 11,17,30 Ed Giovanola; 14 Tony Graffanino; 5 Tyler Houston; 10 Chipper Jones; 20 Mark Lemke; 5 Pablo Martínez; 27 Fred McGriff; 16 Mike Mordecai; 5 Terry Pendleton	**Outfielders**: 15 Danny Bautista; 24 Jermaine Dye; 9 Marquis Grissom; 25 Andruw Jones; 23 David Justice; 18 Ryan Klesko; 17 Luis Polonia; 7 Dwight Smith; 19 Jerome Walton; 25 Mark Whiten	**Manager**: 6 Bobby Cox; **Coaches**: 37 Jim Beauchamp (bench); 39 Pat Corrales (first base); 28 Clarence Jones (hitting); 54 Leo Mazzone (pitching); 22 Jimy Williams (third base); 42 Ned Yost (bullpen)

== Player stats ==
=== Batting ===
==== Starters by position ====
Note: Pos = Position; G = Games played; AB = At bats; H = Hits; Avg. = Batting average; HR = Home runs; RBI = Runs batted in

Pos	Player	G	AB	H	Avg.	HR	RBI
C	Javy López	138	489	138	.282	23	69
1B	Fred McGriff	159	617	182	.295	28	107
2B	Mark Lemke	135	498	127	.255	5	37
SS	Jeff Blauser	83	265	65	.245	10	35
3B	Chipper Jones	157	598	185	.309	30	110
LF	Ryan Klesko	153	528	149	.282	34	93
CF	Marquis Grissom	158	671	207	.308	23	74
RF	Jermaine Dye	98	292	82	.281	12	37

==== Other batters ====
Note: G = Games played; AB = At bats; H = Hits; Avg. = Batting average; HR = Home runs; RBI = Runs batted in

Player	G	AB	H	Avg.	HR	RBI
Terry Pendleton	42	162	33	.204	4	17
Eddie Pérez	68	156	40	.256	4	17
Dwight Smith	101	153	31	.203	3	16
Rafael Belliard	86	142	24	.169	0	3
David Justice	40	140	45	.321	6	25
Mike Mordecai	66	108	26	.241	2	8
Andruw Jones	31	106	23	.217	5	13
Mark Whiten	36	90	23	.256	3	17
Ed Giovanola	43	82	19	.232	0	7
Jerome Walton	37	47	16	.340	1	4
Tony Graffanino	22	46	8	.174	0	2
Luis Polonia	22	31	13	.419	0	2
Tyler Houston	33	27	6	.222	1	8
Danny Bautista	17	20	3	.150	0	1
Joe Ayrault	7	5	1	.200	0	0
Pablo Martínez	4	2	1	.500	0	0

=== Pitching ===
==== Starting pitchers ====
Note: G = Games pitched; IP = Innings pitched; W = Wins; L = Losses; ERA = Earned run average; SO = Strikeouts

Player	G	IP	W	L	ERA	SO
John Smoltz	35	253.2	24	8	2.94	276
Greg Maddux	35	245.0	15	11	2.72	172
Tom Glavine	36	235.1	15	10	2.98	181
Steve Avery	24	131.0	7	10	4.47	86
Jason Schmidt	13	58.2	3	4	6.75	48
Denny Neagle	6	38.2	2	3	5.59	18

==== Other pitchers ====
Note: G = Games pitched; IP = Innings pitched; W = Wins; L = Losses; ERA = Earned run average; SO = Strikeouts

Player	G	IP	W	L	ERA	SO
Mike Bielecki	40	75.1	4	3	2.63	71
Terrell Wade	44	69.2	5	0	2.97	79
Brad Woodall	8	19.2	2	2	7.32	20

==== Relief pitchers ====
Note: G = Games pitched; W = Wins; L = Losses; SV = Saves; ERA = Earned run average; SO = Strikeouts

Player	G	W	L	SV	ERA	SO
Mark Wohlers	77	2	4	39	3.03	100
Brad Clontz	81	6	3	1	5.69	49
Greg McMichael	73	5	3	2	3.22	78
Pedro Borbón, Jr.	43	3	0	1	2.75	31
Joe Borowski	22	2	4	0	4.85	15
Dean Hartgraves	20	1	0	0	4.34	14
Kevin Lomon	6	0	0	0	4.91	1
Tom Thobe	4	0	1	0	1.50	1
Carl Schutz	3	0	0	0	2.70	5

== National League Divisional Playoffs ==
=== Atlanta Braves vs. Los Angeles Dodgers ===
Atlanta wins the series, 3–0

Game	Home	Score	Visitor	Score	Date	Series
1	Los Angeles	1	Atlanta	2	October 2	1–0 (ATL)
2	Los Angeles	2	Atlanta	3	October 3	2–0 (ATL)
3	Atlanta	5	Los Angeles	2	October 5	3–0 (ATL)

== National League Championship Series ==
=== Game 1 ===
October 9: Atlanta–Fulton County Stadium in Atlanta

Team	1	2	3	4	5	6	7	8	9	R	H	E
St. Louis	0	1	0	0	0	0	1	0	0	2	5	1
Atlanta	0	0	0	0	2	0	0	2	X	4	9	0
WP: John Smoltz (1–0) LP: Mark Petkovsek (0–1) SV: Mark Wohlers (1); Home runs: STL: None; ATL: None

=== Game 2 ===
October 10: Atlanta–Fulton County Stadium in Atlanta

Team	1	2	3	4	5	6	7	8	9	R	H	E
St. Louis	1	0	2	0	0	0	5	0	0	8	11	2
Atlanta	0	0	2	0	0	1	0	0	0	3	5	2
WP: Todd Stottlemyre (1–0) LP: Greg Maddux (0–1); Home runs: STL: Gary Gaetti (1); ATL: Marquis Grissom (1)

=== Game 3 ===
October 12: Busch Stadium in St. Louis, Missouri

Team	1	2	3	4	5	6	7	8	9	R	H	E
Atlanta	1	0	0	0	0	0	0	1	0	2	8	1
St. Louis	2	0	0	0	0	1	0	0	X	3	7	0
WP: Donovan Osborne (1–0) LP: Tom Glavine (0–1) SV: Dennis Eckersley (1); Home runs: ATL: None; STL: Ron Gant 2 (2)

=== Game 4 ===
October 13: Busch Stadium in St. Louis, Missouri

Team	1	2	3	4	5	6	7	8	9	R	H	E
Atlanta	0	1	0	0	0	2	0	0	0	3	9	1
St. Louis	0	0	0	0	0	0	3	1	X	4	5	0
WP: Dennis Eckersley (1–0) LP: Greg McMichael (0–1); Home runs: ATL: Mark Lemke (1), Ryan Klesko (1); STL: Brian Jordan (1)

=== Game 5 ===
October 14: Busch Stadium in St. Louis, Missouri

Team	1	2	3	4	5	6	7	8	9	R	H	E
Atlanta	5	2	0	3	1	0	0	1	2	14	22	0
St. Louis	0	0	0	0	0	0	0	0	0	0	7	0
WP: John Smoltz (2–0) LP: Todd Stottlemyre (1–1); Home runs: ATL: Fred McGriff (1), Javy López (1); STL: None

=== Game 6 ===
October 16: Atlanta–Fulton County Stadium in Atlanta

Team	1	2	3	4	5	6	7	8	9	R	H	E
St. Louis	0	0	0	0	0	0	0	1	0	1	6	1
Atlanta	0	1	0	0	1	0	0	1	X	3	7	0
WP: Greg Maddux (1–1) LP: Alan Benes (0–1) SV: Mark Wohlers (2); Home runs: STL: None; ATL: None

=== Game 7 ===
October 17: Atlanta–Fulton County Stadium in Atlanta

Team	1	2	3	4	5	6	7	8	9	R	H	E
St. Louis	0	0	0	0	0	0	0	0	0	0	4	2
Atlanta	6	0	0	4	0	3	2	0	X	15	17	0
WP: Tom Glavine (1–1) LP: Donovan Osborne (1–1); Home runs: STL: None; ATL: Javy López (2), Andruw Jones (1), Fred McGriff (2)

== World Series ==
=== Game 1 ===
October 20, 1996, at Yankee Stadium in New York City

Team	1	2	3	4	5	6	7	8	9	R	H	E
Atlanta	0	2	6	0	1	3	0	0	0	12	13	0
New York	0	0	0	0	1	0	0	0	0	1	4	1
WP: John Smoltz (1–0) LP: Andy Pettitte (0–1); Home runs: ATL: Andruw Jones 2 (2), Fred McGriff (1); NYY: None

=== Game 2 ===
October 21, 1996, at Yankee Stadium in New York City

Team	1	2	3	4	5	6	7	8	9	R	H	E
Atlanta	1	0	1	0	1	1	0	0	0	4	10	0
New York	0	0	0	0	0	0	0	0	0	0	7	1
WP: Greg Maddux (1–0) LP: Jimmy Key (0–1)

=== Game 3 ===
October 22, 1996, at Atlanta–Fulton County Stadium in Atlanta

Team	1	2	3	4	5	6	7	8	9	R	H	E
New York	1	0	0	1	0	0	0	3	0	5	8	1
Atlanta	0	0	0	0	0	1	0	1	0	2	6	1
WP: David Cone (1–0) LP: Tom Glavine (0–1) Sv: John Wetteland (1); Home runs: NYY: Bernie Williams (1); ATL: None

=== Game 4 ===
October 23, 1996, at Atlanta–Fulton County Stadium in Atlanta

Team	1	2	3	4	5	6	7	8	9	10	R	H	E
New York	0	0	0	0	0	3	0	3	0	2	8	12	0
Atlanta	0	4	1	0	1	0	0	0	0	0	6	9	2
WP: Graeme Lloyd (1–0) LP: Steve Avery (0–1) Sv: John Wetteland (2); Home runs: NYY: Jim Leyritz (1); ATL: Fred McGriff (2)

=== Game 5 ===
October 24, 1996, at Atlanta–Fulton County Stadium in Atlanta

Team	1	2	3	4	5	6	7	8	9	R	H	E
New York	0	0	0	1	0	0	0	0	0	1	4	1
Atlanta	0	0	0	0	0	0	0	0	0	0	5	1
WP: Andy Pettitte (1–1) LP: John Smoltz (1–1) Sv: John Wetteland (3)

=== Game 6 ===
October 26, 1996, at Yankee Stadium in New York City

Team	1	2	3	4	5	6	7	8	9	R	H	E
Atlanta	0	0	0	1	0	0	0	0	1	2	8	0
New York	0	0	3	0	0	0	0	0	X	3	8	1
WP: Jimmy Key (1–1) LP: Greg Maddux (1–1) Sv: = John Wetteland (4)

== Award winners ==
- Tom Glavine, P, Silver Slugger Award
- Marquis Grissom, OF, Gold Glove Award
- Javy López, C, NLCS MVP
- Greg Maddux, P, Gold Glove Award
- John Smoltz, P, Pitcher of the Month Award, April
- John Smoltz, P, Pitcher of the Month Award, May
- John Smoltz, P, National League Cy Young Award
- John Smoltz, Sporting News Pitcher of the Year Award

1996 Major League Baseball All-Star Game

- Fred McGriff, 1B, starter
- Chipper Jones, 3B, starter
- John Smoltz, P, starter
- Tom Glavine, P, reserve
- Greg Maddux, P, reserve
- Mark Wohlers, P, reserve

== Farm system ==
Level	Team	League	Manager
AAA	Richmond Braves	International League	Bill Dancy
AA	Greenville Braves	Southern League	Jeff Cox
A	Durham Bulls	Carolina League	Randy Ingle
A	Macon Braves	South Atlantic League	Paul Runge
A-Short Season	Eugene Emeralds	Northwest League	Jim Saul
Rookie	Danville Braves	Appalachian League	Brian Snitker
Rookie	GCL Braves	Gulf Coast League	Robert Lucas and Chino Cadahia
