= Evansville Lutheran School =

Private, parochial elementary school in Evansville, Indiana, United States

Location
- 111 East Virginia Street; Evansville, Vanderburgh County, Indiana 47711; United States; 37.981137°N 87.561752°W

Information
- Type: Private, Parochial elementary
- Religious affiliation: Lutheranism
- Denomination: Lutheran Church–Missouri Synod
- Established: 1971; 55 years ago
- Principal: Logan Waggy
- Faculty: 13
- Grades: K-8
- Enrollment: 184 (2013-2014)
- Campus: Urban
- Colors: Purple, gold and white
- Athletics: Basketball, Volleyball, Cheerleading, Cross Country, Track and Field
- Website: www.evansvillelutheranschool.com

Evansville Lutheran School is a private, Lutheran parochial elementary school located in Evansville, Indiana, in the United States. Established in 1971, Evansville Lutheran School is the first parochial Lutheran school. The school is affiliated with the Lutheran Church–Missouri Synod (LCMS).

== Overview ==
The school is based on the ideas and concepts of Martin Luther. The school was originally divided into two sections: the Early Childhood Campus (ECC) for grades K–4 and the Middle Upper Grade Campus (MUG) for grades 5–8.

Today the school holds all students in their original ECC campus, located on Virginia St. The school is supported by two Lutheran churches: St. Paul's Lutheran Church and Lutheran Church of Our Redeemer. The school is in basketball LIT tournaments and is known for its music program. The school teaches students to honor God in the terms of Martin Luther.

As for sports, the school offers basketball, cheerleading, cross country, track, and volleyball. The school has also developed a program for younger children who are interested in learning basketball, called the Lutheran Developmental League, teaching children in grades K–4 the sport of basketball.

The school colors are purple and gold, which represent royalty, and their mascot is a ruling monarch.

== Notable alumni ==
- Andy Benes – 1977 Professional baseball player for the major leagues
- Alan Benes – 1975 Professional baseball player for the major leagues
- Talitha Washington – Mathematician, graduated 1988.
