= Mike Oquist =

American baseball player (born 1968)

- Pitcher
- Born: May 30, 1968 (age 58); La Junta, Colorado, U.S.
- Batted: Right Threw: Right

MLB debut
- August 14, 1993, for the Baltimore Orioles

Last MLB appearance
- September 21, 1999, for the Oakland Athletics

MLB statistics
- Win–loss record: 25–31
- Earned run average: 5.46
- Strikeouts: 351
- Stats at Baseball Reference

Teams
- Baltimore Orioles (1993–1995); San Diego Padres (1996); Oakland Athletics (1997–1999)

Michael Lee Oquist (born May 30, 1968) is an American former professional baseball pitcher. He played in Major League Baseball (MLB) for the Baltimore Orioles, San Diego Padres, and Oakland Athletics from 1993 to 1999.

== Career ==
Oquist played collegiate baseball at the University of Arkansas prior to turning professional.

On August 3, 1998, Oquist gave up 14 earned runs to the New York Yankees. Oquist allowed 14 runs on 16 hits, with the most being in the 2nd inning (7). He struck out three batters while walking three and allowing four home runs on 115 pitches. The four relievers that closed the game out for the Athletics allowed a combined total of one hit, one walk, and four strikeouts. Conversely, Orlando Hernandez, the pitcher for the Yankees, pitched a complete game while allowing a run on three hits with eight strikeouts. He threw 123 pitches while Oquist (five days removed from his previous pitching appearance) threw 115. His final game score was a -21, while his ERA ballooned from 5.87 to 6.61.
