= Sean Mulligan =

American baseball player

- Catcher
- Born: April 25, 1970 (age 55); Lynwood, California, U.S.
- Batted: Right Threw: Right

MLB debut
- September 1, 1996, for the San Diego Padres

Last MLB appearance
- September 6, 1996, for the San Diego Padres

MLB statistics
- Batting average: .000
- Home runs: 0
- Runs batted in: 0

CPBL statistics
- Batting average: .305
- Home runs: 3
- Runs batted in: 9
- Stats at Baseball Reference

Teams
- San Diego Padres (1996); Mercuries Tigers (1998)

Sean Patrick Mulligan (born April 25, 1970) is an American former professional baseball player. A catcher in the minor leagues, Mulligan played in two games as a pinch hitter for the San Diego Padres of Major League Baseball (MLB) in 1996. He was famously traded away from San Diego in exchange for $50,000 and a treadmill. He last played professional baseball in 2001.

Mulligan played college baseball at Illinois.
