= Carl Schutz =

American baseball player (born 1971)

- Relief pitcher
- Born: August 22, 1971 (age 53); Hammond, Louisiana, U.S.
- Batted: Left Threw: Left

MLB debut
- September 3, 1996, for the Atlanta Braves

Last MLB appearance
- September 24, 1996, for the Atlanta Braves

MLB statistics
- Win–loss record: 0–0
- Earned run average: 2.70
- Strikeouts: 5
- Stats at Baseball Reference

Teams
- Atlanta Braves (1996)

Carl James Schutz (born August 22, 1971) is a former Major League Baseball pitcher. He played one season with the Atlanta Braves in 1996 for the month of September.
