= Miguel Mejia (outfielder) =

Dominican baseball player (born 1975)

Miguel Mejía
- Outfielder / Pinch runner
- Born: March 25, 1975 (age 51); San Pedro de Macorís, Dominican Republic
- Batted: Right Threw: Right

MLB debut
- April 4, 1996, for the St. Louis Cardinals

Last MLB appearance
- September 29, 1996, for the St. Louis Cardinals

MLB statistics
- Games played: 45
- Batting average: .087
- Stolen bases: 6
- Stats at Baseball Reference

Teams
- St. Louis Cardinals (1996)

Miguel Mejía (born March 25, 1975) is a Dominican former Major League Baseball player. Mejia played for the St. Louis Cardinals in 1996. He was used as both an outfielder and a pinch runner. He was selected by the Kansas City Royals from the Baltimore Orioles in the Rule 5 draft on December 4, 1995.
