= Pablo Martínez (shortstop) =

Dominican baseball player (born 1969)

- Shortstop
- Born: June 29, 1969 (age 56); Sabana Grande de Boyá, Monte Plata, Dominican Republic
- Batted: Both Threw: Right

MLB debut
- July 20, 1996, for the Atlanta Braves

Last MLB appearance
- August 4, 1996, for the Atlanta Braves

MLB statistics
- Batting average: .500
- Home runs: 0
- Runs batted in: 0
- Stats at Baseball Reference

Teams
- Atlanta Braves (1996)

Pablo Made "Valera" Martinez (born June 29, 1969) is a Dominican former Major League Baseball shortstop. He played one season with the Atlanta Braves in 1996 between July 20 and August 4.
