= Andy Benes =

American baseball player (born 1967)

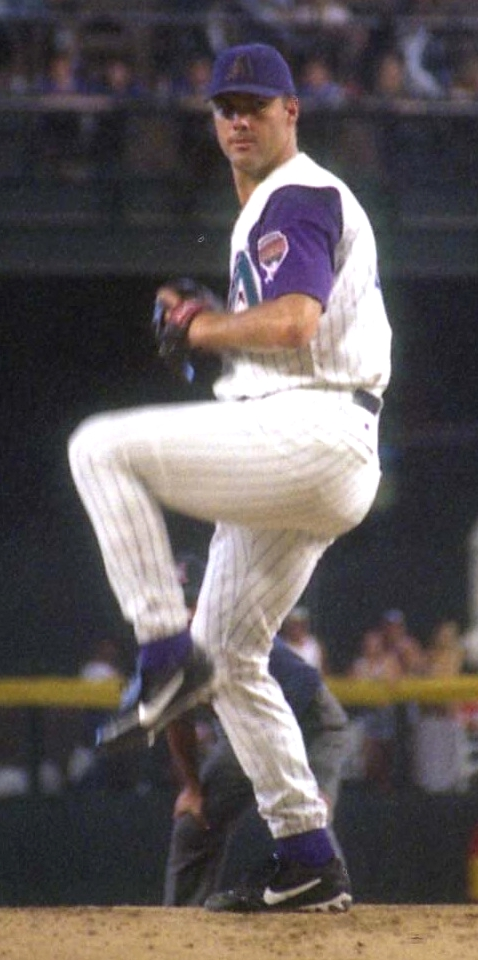
- Pitcher
- Born: August 20, 1967 (age 59); Evansville, Indiana, U.S.
- Batted: Right Threw: Right

MLB debut
- August 11, 1989, for the San Diego Padres

Last MLB appearance
- September 29, 2002, for the St. Louis Cardinals

MLB statistics
- Win–loss record: 155–139
- Earned run average: 3.97
- Strikeouts: 2,000
- Stats at Baseball Reference

Teams
- San Diego Padres (1989–1995); Seattle Mariners (1995); St. Louis Cardinals (1996–1997); Arizona Diamondbacks (1998–1999); St. Louis Cardinals (2000–2002)

Career highlights and awards
- All-Star (1993); NL strikeout leader (1994)
Medals
Baseball
Representing United States
Olympic Games
Gold medal – first place	1988 Seoul	Team
Baseball World Cup
Silver medal – second place	1988 Rome	Team

Andrew Charles Benes (/ˈbɛnɛs/ BEN-es; born August 20, 1967) is an American former professional baseball pitcher who played 14 seasons in Major League Baseball (MLB), most prominently as a member of the San Diego Padres, who selected Benes as the first overall pick in the 1988 MLB draft. With the Padres, he was named to the National League (NL) All-Star team in 1993 and led the league in strikeouts in 1994. He also played for the Seattle Mariners, St. Louis Cardinals, and Arizona Diamondbacks.

== Career ==
Benes was born in Evansville, Indiana, where he attended Evansville Lutheran School and Evansville Central High School, as did his brother Alan Benes.

He played college baseball in his hometown for the University of Evansville Purple Aces. He also played college football and basketball at Evansville before focusing solely on baseball in 1987. In 1988, he was named Player of the Year by Collegiate Baseball Newspaper and an All-American by Baseball America and the ABCA. He had a 16–3 record with 188 strikeouts, including 21 strikeouts in a game against UNC-Wilmington.

He was the first player selected in the 1988 Major League Baseball draft by the Padres. Before signing with the Padres, Benes pitched for the United States in the 1988 Summer Olympics. He pitched 6 2/3 innings, allowed two runs and struck out and walked four batters in a 12–2 win over Australia that clinched the Americans' advance to the medal round. The Americans eventually won their first baseball Olympic gold medal. He also played in the 1988 Baseball World Cup, where the U.S. lost to Cuba in the title game.

Benes signed a contract with the Padres that included a $230,000 signing bonus. He made 21 starts in Minor League Baseball (MiLB), 16 for the Double-A Wichita Wranglers and five with the Las Vegas Stars, before making his MLB debut on August 11. After losing his first two games, he earned his first win over the Philadelphia Phillies on August 23. He finished the season with a 6–3 record. He was named The Sporting News National League Rookie Pitcher of the Year.

Benes was an All-Star in 1993 during a 15–15 season with the Padres and led MLB with 189 strikeouts and 14 losses the next season.

On July 31, 1995, Benes was traded with a player to be named later (Greg Keagle) to the Mariners for Marc Newfield and Ron Villone. He went 7–2 with the Mariners, albeit with a high 5.82 ERA. Both he and the franchise made their first appearance in the MLB postseason in 1995. Benes pitched poorly in the playoffs, going 0–1 and allowing 13 runs in 14 innings. After the season, Benes became a free agent.

Benes signed with the Cardinals before the 1996 season. He finished third in the Cy Young Award balloting in 1996, after an 18–10, 3.83 earned run average season. Benes was primarily a starting pitcher but on May 29, 1996, he picked up his only major league save. He recorded the final out of a 6–5 Cardinals victory over the Colorado Rockies to close out the game for the Cardinals.

After the 1997 season, Benes agreed to a five-year, $30 million contract to return to the Cardinals. Unfortunately, the contract was signed 90 minutes after a deadline to re-sign players.

Instead, Benes became one of the first players in Diamondbacks history when he signed a three-year, $18 million contract prior to the team's inaugural 1998 season. He threw the first pitch, a ball, and earned the first loss in Diamondbacks history, as the team fell on Opening Day to the Rockies. He led the team with 14 wins, 34 starts, and 164 strikeouts in its first season.

Benes returned to the Cardinals in 2000. He ended his career with 2,000 strikeouts, which is in the top 100 in MLB history. His final regular season MLB pitch struck out Ryan Christenson on September 29, 2002. He ended his career in the NL Championship Series, earning a loss in Game 4 to the San Francisco Giants.

Relief pitcher Todd Jones wrote in The Sporting News in 2004 that Benes had a habit of gritting his teeth when preparing to throw a slider, a tell that hitters could exploit.

=== Honors ===
Benes was inducted into the Purple Aces Hall of Fame in 1994, the Missouri Sports Hall of Fame in 2020, and the Missouri Valley Conference Hall of Fame in 2023. The University of Evansville retired his number in 2010. He received the Southern Indiana Athletic Conference Lifetime Achievement Award in 2016.

He received the Padres Clyde McCullough Pitcher of the Year Award in 1991 and 1993 and was named the NL Player of the Week for the week of August 1, 1993.

== Personal life ==
Benes and his younger brother Alan Benes were teammates on the Cardinals in 1996–1997 and 2000–2001. Another younger brother Adam Benes was drafted by the Cardinals in 1995 and pitched in the minors until 2000.

Benes and his wife Jennifer married in 1987. They have seven children and live near St. Louis. Their first child Drew Benes was drafted by the Cardinals in 2010 and pitched in the Cardinals organization from 2010 to 2012. Their fourth child Shane Benes played for the State College Spikes in the Cardinals system in 2019. Benes is a Christian.

== See also ==
- List of Major League Baseball career strikeout leaders
