= Tom Pagnozzi =

American baseball player (born 1962)

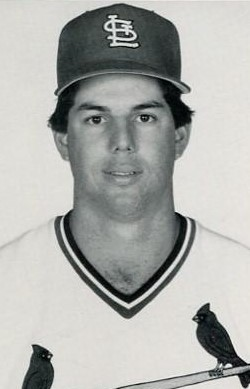
- Catcher
- Born: July 30, 1962 (age 63); Tucson, Arizona, U.S.
- Batted: Right Threw: Right

MLB debut
- April 12, 1987, for the St. Louis Cardinals

Last MLB appearance
- August 15, 1998, for the St. Louis Cardinals

MLB statistics
- Batting average: .253
- Home runs: 44
- Runs batted in: 320
- Stats at Baseball Reference

Teams
- St. Louis Cardinals (1987–1998)

Career highlights and awards
- All-Star (1992); 3× Gold Glove Award (1991, 1992, 1994)

Thomas Alan Pagnozzi (born July 30, 1962) is an American former professional baseball player. He played his entire 12-year Major League Baseball (MLB) career as a catcher for the St. Louis Cardinals, from 1987 through 1998. A three-time Gold Glove Award winner, Pagnozzi was named to the National League All-Star team in 1992. Besides catcher, Pagnozzi also made 40 appearances at first base and seven at third base during his career.

== Baseball career ==
Pagnozzi was born in Tucson, Arizona. He attended University of Arkansas where he played for the Arkansas Razorbacks baseball team. Initially a backup catcher and utility player for the Cardinals, in 1990. Pagnozzi impressed Cardinals manager Joe Torre enough to move Todd Zeile, then the Cardinals' hot catching prospect, to third base to make room for him. Pagnozzi remained the Cardinals' regular catcher until 1996. While he had moderate power and was considered a run batted in (RBI) threat, he was primarily regarded for his defense, for which he won the Gold Glove Award in 1991, 1992, and 1994. Pagnozzi made the National League All-Star team in 1992.

From 1986 to 1990, Pagnozzi played in the Puerto Rican Liga de Béisbol Profesional Roberto Clemente with the Indios de Mayagüez (Mayagüez Indians).

Pagnozzi retired from MLB as a player in 1998 at the age of 36 after having been released by the Cardinals in August. However, he signed a short-lived minor-league contract with the New York Yankees in December 1999. His offensive career totals included a batting average of .253 with 44 home runs and 320 RBI. He placed in the top five in Cardinals franchise history in catcher defensive categories such as games caught, innings, putouts, stolen bases allowed, caught stealing, and fielding percentage.

Tom Pagnozzi's nephew, Matt Pagnozzi, was also a catcher, and made his debut with the Cardinals on September 29, 2009.

== See also ==
- List of Major League Baseball players who spent their entire career with one franchise
- List of St. Louis Cardinals team records
- St. Louis Cardinals award winners and league leaders
