= Javy López =

Puerto Rican baseball player (born 1970)

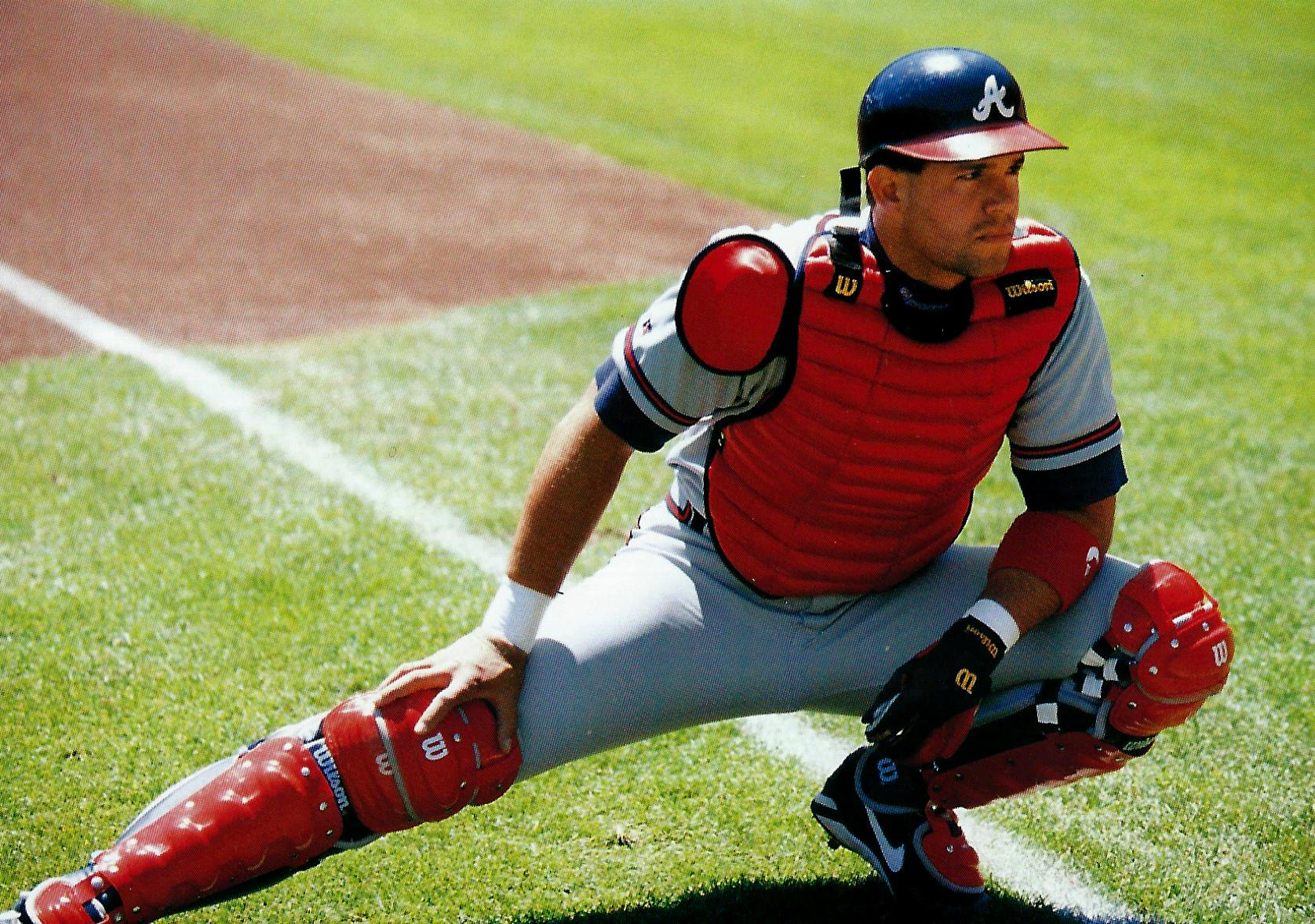
- López as a catcher for the Atlanta Braves
- Catcher
- Born: November 5, 1970 (age 55); Ponce, Puerto Rico
- Batted: Right Threw: Right

MLB debut
- September 18, 1992, for the Atlanta Braves

Last MLB appearance
- September 2, 2006, for the Boston Red Sox

MLB statistics
- Batting average: .287
- Home runs: 260
- Runs batted in: 864
- Stats at Baseball Reference

Teams
- Atlanta Braves (1992–2003); Baltimore Orioles (2004–2006); Boston Red Sox (2006)

Career highlights and awards
- 3× All-Star (1997, 1998, 2003); World Series champion (1995); NLCS MVP (1996); Silver Slugger Award (2003); Braves Hall of Fame

Javier "Javy" López Torres (born November 5, 1970) is a Puerto Rican former professional baseball player. A catcher, he played in Major League Baseball for the Atlanta Braves, Baltimore Orioles, and Boston Red Sox. With Atlanta, López was a member of the 1995 World Series championship team, a three-time All-Star selection, and won a Silver Slugger Award in 2003. He is an inductee of the Braves Hall of Fame.

== Professional career ==
=== Atlanta Braves ===
López was signed by the Atlanta Braves in 1987 as an amateur free agent, López made his debut on September 18, 1992, against the Houston Astros. After sharing duties with Charlie O'Brien and Eddie Pérez for four seasons, he established himself as the Braves' regular catcher in 1996. The same season, he led the Braves to win the National League Championship Series, earning the series Most Valuable Player honors. He also made the National League All-Star team from 1997–98. Lopez had his best season in 2003 with a .328 batting average, 43 home runs and 109 RBI in 129 games, including a .378 on-base percentage and a .687 slugging percentage. In that season he broke Todd Hundley's record for most home runs hit in a season by a catcher (42) and was selected to the All-Star Game, winning the Silver Slugger Award and finishing fifth in the National League MVP ballot. The positional record stood until Cal Raleigh broke it in 2025. While with the Braves, López caught Kent Mercker's no-hitter on April 8, 1994.

While López starred for the Braves, he very rarely caught future Hall of Fame pitcher Greg Maddux, who was not comfortable pitching to him. Instead the Braves' backup catcher, which varied over the years, would become Maddux's personal catcher.

=== Baltimore Orioles ===
Before the 2004 season, López signed as a free agent with the Baltimore Orioles. He hit .316 with 23 HR and 86 RBI, the following year López suffered a broken hand on a foul tip, ending the year with a .278 with 15 HR and 49 RBI while seeing a decline in his game time from 150 to 103 games.

=== Boston Red Sox ===
In the 2006 midseason, López was acquired by the Boston Red Sox from Baltimore in exchange for minor league outfielder Adam Stern and cash considerations. López debuted with Boston on the same day after Doug Mirabelli left the game early after an ankle injury. On September 8, the Red Sox released López due to Jason Varitek returning from the disabled list, which minimized playing time for López.

=== Retirement ===
In January 2007, it was reported that López reached a preliminary agreement on a $750,000, one-year contract with the Colorado Rockies, but he did not play for them during the regular season. Before the 2008 season he signed a minor league deal with an invitation to spring training with the Atlanta Braves, in an attempt to return to the majors. But after being told he would not make the opening day lineup, López retired for good. "I feel perfect physically," he said. "It's just that the hitting wasn't there and unfortunately I couldn’t throw anybody out on stealing attempts. That's a concern. I don't blame them. My role as a backup catcher is to be able to throw runners out." He plans to continue in the Atlanta Braves organization performing other duties. In a 15-season career, López posted a .287 average with 260 home runs and 864 RBI in 1,503 games. His 243 home runs as a catcher ranks eighth on the career list at that position. Strong defensively, he recorded a .992 fielding percentage. In 60 postseason games, he batted .278 (57-for-205) with 27 runs, 14 doubles, 10 home runs, 28 RBI and 14 walks. His final game was on September 2, 2006.

== Personal life ==
López's first marriage was to Analy Hernández. They have two children. The marriage ended in divorce. López married his second wife, Gina Brodbeck, on June 23, 2004. They have two sons.

== See also ==
- List of Major League Baseball players from Puerto Rico
- List of Puerto Ricans
- List of Major League Baseball career home run leaders
