= Tony Fossas =

Cuban baseball player (born 1957)

- Pitcher
- Born: September 23, 1957 (age 68); Havana, Cuba
- Batted: Left Threw: Left

MLB debut
- May 15, 1988, for the Texas Rangers

Last MLB appearance
- May 14, 1999, for the New York Yankees

MLB statistics
- Win–loss record: 17–24
- Earned run average: 3.90
- Strikeouts: 324
- Stats at Baseball Reference

Teams
- Texas Rangers (1988); Milwaukee Brewers (1989–1990); Boston Red Sox (1991–1994); St. Louis Cardinals (1995–1997); Seattle Mariners (1998); Chicago Cubs (1998); Texas Rangers (1998); New York Yankees (1999)

Emilio Antonio Fossas Morejon (born September 23, 1957) is a Cuban former left-handed professional baseball pitcher. He played in Major League Baseball (MLB) from 1988 to 1999 for the Texas Rangers, Milwaukee Brewers, Boston Red Sox, St. Louis Cardinals, Seattle Mariners, Chicago Cubs, and New York Yankees.

== Amateur career ==
Fossas attended St. Mary's High School in Brookline, Massachusetts, and was selected as a 12th round pick by the Texas Rangers during the 1979 Major League Baseball draft. The previous year he had been drafted by the Minnesota Twins, but decided not to sign with the team, instead finishing his college studies and collegiate career at University of South Florida in Tampa. In 1978, he played collegiate summer baseball for the Falmouth Commodores of the Cape Cod Baseball League.

== Professional career ==
At the age of 31, Fossas received a promotion to the majors in 1988 with the Rangers, who released him during the offseason. Although he only pitched 5 2/3 innings that initial year, Fossas eventually became an entrenched yeoman setup pitcher with the Milwaukee Brewers from 1989 to 1990, the Boston Red Sox from 1991 to 1994, and the St. Louis Cardinals from 1995 to 1997.

Fossas' greatest success came as a left-handed specialist reliever, or LOOGY, a pitcher who was brought in expressly to face one or two particularly dangerous left-handed batters (during Fossas's tenure, this included such players as Fred McGriff, Ken Griffey Jr., Barry Bonds, and George Brett). For example, against the hall of famers, Brett and Griffey, Fossas held them to only 6 hits in 42 at bats, which is a .143 batting average. As a left-handed reliever with an unorthodox delivery, he was well-suited to this role, and often faced only one or two batters in each appearance. With Boston in 1992, Fossas made 60 appearances, but due to his specialized use he pitched a total of less than 30 innings. Fossas amassed 7 career saves; five of those required him to only retire one batter (a left handed hitter) for the final out. Because of this specialty he was nicknamed “The Mechanic,” and he built his reputation by stepping in to face mostly left-handed hitters when the pressure was on.

In 1998 he pitched for the Seattle Mariners, Chicago Cubs and returned to the Texas Rangers in what would be his last full year before finishing his career with the New York Yankees in 1999.

== Coaching career ==
Fossas became a pitching coach for Florida Atlantic University Owls in 2005. He became the pitching coach for the minor league Dayton Dragons in 2009.

On November 19, 2024, Fossas was hired to serve as the pitching coach for the Gastonia Ghost Peppers of the Atlantic League of Professional Baseball.

== Personal life ==
Fossas lives in Clover, SC. He is a former resident of Florida with his wife Pura, daughter Keila, and son Mark.
