= Mark Petkovsek =

American baseball player (born 1965)

- Pitcher
- Born: November 18, 1965 (age 60); Beaumont, Texas, U.S.
- Batted: Right Threw: Right

MLB debut
- June 8, 1991, for the Texas Rangers

Last MLB appearance
- October 4, 2001, for the Texas Rangers

MLB statistics
- Win–loss record: 46–28
- Earned run average: 4.73
- Strikeouts: 358
- Stats at Baseball Reference

Teams
- Texas Rangers (1991); Pittsburgh Pirates (1993); St. Louis Cardinals (1995–1998); Anaheim Angels (1999–2000); Texas Rangers (2001)

Mark Joseph Petkovsek (born November 18, 1965) is an American former professional baseball pitcher. He played in Major League Baseball (MLB) for the Texas Rangers, Pittsburgh Pirates, St. Louis Cardinals, and Anaheim Angels.

== Biography ==
Petkovsek attended the University of Texas, where he threw a seven-inning no-hitter in March 1987. In 1985 and 1986, Petkovsek played collegiate summer baseball for the Chatham A's of the Cape Cod Baseball League (CCBL). He compiled a 14–4 mark in the two seasons with Chatham, and in 2016 was inducted into the CCBL Hall of Fame.

Petkovsek was a first-round pick of the Rangers in 1987, and in 1991, he made his major-league debut with the club, pitching 4 2/3 innings and taking the loss against the New York Yankees.

The Rangers granted him his free agency following the year, and he signed with Pittsburgh for 1992. He spent the year at AAA Buffalo, where he co-aced for the club with Tim Wakefield.

After Petkovsek appeared in 23 games for Pittsburgh in 1993, the Pirates let Petkovsek walk, and the right-hander signed with the Astros for 1994. They assigned him to AAA Tucson out of spring training, and he spent the entire year there.

On May 16, 1994, Petkovsek threw the first nine-inning no-hitter in Tucson franchise history, beating the Colorado Springs Sky Sox, 5–0, in his only complete game of the year. For his effort, Petkovsek was named PCL Pitcher of the Week.

As had the Rangers and Pirates before them, the Astros granted Petkovsek his free agency after the 1994 season, and he found a home in the Cardinals organization, pitching at both AAA Louisville and for the major-league team in 1995. His 21 major league starts that year were a career high.

He helped the Cardinals win the 1996 National League Central division title, winning 11 times against only two defeats as a swingman. The 11 wins he had for St. Louis were a career high, regardless of professional level.
