= Donovan Osborne =

American baseball player (born 1969)

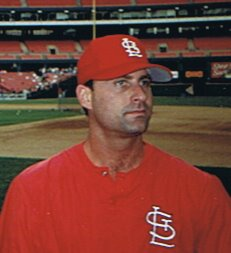
- Pitcher
- Born: June 21, 1969 (age 56); Roseville, California, U.S.
- Batted: Switch Threw: Left

MLB debut
- April 9, 1992, for the St. Louis Cardinals

Last MLB appearance
- May 15, 2004, for the New York Yankees

MLB statistics
- Win–loss record: 49–46
- Earned run average: 4.03
- Strikeouts: 558
- Stats at Baseball Reference

Teams
- St. Louis Cardinals (1992–1993, 1995–1999); Chicago Cubs (2002); New York Yankees (2004)

Donovan Alan Osborne (born June 21, 1969) is an American former Major League Baseball player who pitched in the Major Leagues from 1992 to 2004.

== Career ==
Osborne attended Carson High School in Carson City, Nevada before he was drafted by the Montreal Expos in the 1987 Major League Baseball draft. After declining to sign with the Expos, Osborne attended the University of Nevada, Las Vegas (UNLV), where he played for the UNLV Rebels baseball team. Out of UNLV, Osborne was chosen by the St. Louis Cardinals in the first round (13th overall) of the 1990 amateur draft.

In the 1992 season, his Major League debut season, Osborne finished fifth in MLB Rookie of the Year Award voting.

Osborne was the Cardinals' Opening Day starter in 1999. In 1996, Osborne won 13 games for the Cardinals, made 30 starts for the only time in his career, pitched 198 2/3 innings, and posted a 3.53 earned run average. He ranked among the National League top-10 in walks per nine innings, shutouts, ERA+, and strike-to-walk ratio.
