= Alan Benes =

American baseball player (born 1972)

- Pitcher
- Born: January 21, 1972 (age 54); Evansville, Indiana, U.S.
- Batted: Right Threw: Right

MLB debut
- September 19, 1995, for the St. Louis Cardinals

Last MLB appearance
- May 28, 2003, for the Texas Rangers

MLB statistics
- Win–loss record: 29–28
- Earned run average: 4.59
- Strikeouts: 401
- Stats at Baseball Reference

Teams
- St. Louis Cardinals (1995–2001); Chicago Cubs (2002–2003); Texas Rangers (2003)

Alan Paul Benes (born January 21, 1972) is an American former professional baseball pitcher. He played in Major League Baseball from 1995 to 2003 for the St. Louis Cardinals, Chicago Cubs and Texas Rangers. He stood at 6 feet 5 inches (1.96 m) and weighed 215 pounds (98 kg).

== Amateur career ==
Benes attended Lake Forest High School in Illinois and Creighton University, where he was part of Creighton's NCAA College World Series appearance (1991). In 1991, he played collegiate summer baseball in the Cape Cod Baseball League for the Yarmouth-Dennis Red Sox and was named a league all-star. He was selected by the St. Louis Cardinals in the first round of the 1993 MLB draft.

== Professional career ==
He began his major league career in 1995, pitching in three games for the Cardinals. His highlight years included the 1996 and 1997 seasons with the Cardinals, when he won a combined 22 games and struck out 291 batters over 353 innings. His performance during the 1996 season helped the Cardinals reach the playoffs for the first time since 1987. During the 1996 post-season, Alan posted an 0–1 record with a 2.84 ERA.

In 1997, batters hit only .219 against him, and Benes had 160 strikeouts in 161.2 innings. His 2.89 ERA would have placed him tied for the sixth-best ERA than year, but he fell just 1/3 of an inning short of the 162 required innings when he had a shoulder injury that ended his season in late July. At the time of this injury he ranked third in the league in strikeouts.

Benes sat out the majority of the 1998 and 1999 seasons with an arm injury, which would never allow him to return to top form. From 2000 through 2003, he pitched a combined 123 innings with St. Louis Cardinals, Chicago Cubs and Texas Rangers. After various stints in the minor leagues following the 2003 season, Alan retired before the 2007 season and is currently serving as an instructor to the St. Louis Cardinals.

== Personal ==
Benes is the younger brother and former teammate of former major league pitcher Andy Benes, the older brother of former minor league pitcher Adam Benes, and the uncle of former minor league pitcher Drew Benes.
