= 1996 Major League Baseball season =

1996 MLB season
- League: Major League Baseball
- Sport: Baseball
- Duration: March 31 – October 26, 1996
- Games: 162
- Teams: 28
- TV partner(s): Fox; ESPN; NBC (Note: NBC did not broadcast any regular season games. They only broadcast the All-Star Game, three divisional playoff games in prime time and the ALCS.)

Draft
- Top draft pick: Kris Benson
- Picked by: Pittsburgh Pirates

Regular Season
- Season MVP: AL: Juan González (TEX); NL: Ken Caminiti (SD)

Postseason
- AL champions: New York Yankees
- AL runners-up: Baltimore Orioles
- NL champions: Atlanta Braves
- NL runners-up: St. Louis Cardinals

World Series
- Champions: New York Yankees
- Runners-up: Atlanta Braves
- World Series MVP: John Wetteland (NYY)

MLB seasons
- ← 1995 1997 →

Locations of teams for the 1994–1996 American League seasons
West Central East
Locations of teams for the 1995–1996 National League seasons
West Central East

The 1996 Major League Baseball season was the final season of league-only play before the beginning of interleague play the following season. The season ended with the New York Yankees defeating the defending champion Atlanta Braves in six games for the World Series title, the Yankees' first championship since 1978. The record for most home runs hit in an MLB regular season, set at 4,458 in 1987, was broken, as the AL and NL combined to hit 4,962 home runs. Only 196 shutouts were recorded in the 2,266 MLB regular-season games. This was the first season in the Division Series era to be played to the full 162 games, as the 1994–95 player's strike caused the first two seasons of the era to be abbreviated.

== Standings ==
=== American League ===
AL East
Team	W	L	Pct.	GB	Home	Road
New York Yankees	92	70	.568	—	49‍–‍31	43‍–‍39
Baltimore Orioles	88	74	.543	4	43‍–‍38	45‍–‍36
Boston Red Sox	85	77	.525	7	47‍–‍34	38‍–‍43
Toronto Blue Jays	74	88	.457	18	35‍–‍46	39‍–‍42
Detroit Tigers	53	109	.327	39	27‍–‍54	26‍–‍55

AL Central
Team	W	L	Pct.	GB	Home	Road
Cleveland Indians	99	62	.615	—	51‍–‍29	48‍–‍33
Chicago White Sox	85	77	.525	14½	44‍–‍37	41‍–‍40
Milwaukee Brewers	80	82	.494	19½	38‍–‍43	42‍–‍39
Minnesota Twins	78	84	.481	21½	39‍–‍43	39‍–‍41
Kansas City Royals	75	86	.466	24	37‍–‍43	38‍–‍43

AL West
Team	W	L	Pct.	GB	Home	Road
Texas Rangers	90	72	.556	—	50‍–‍31	40‍–‍41
Seattle Mariners	85	76	.528	4½	43‍–‍38	42‍–‍38
Oakland Athletics	78	84	.481	12	40‍–‍41	38‍–‍43
California Angels	70	91	.435	19½	43‍–‍38	27‍–‍53

=== National League ===
NL East
Team	W	L	Pct.	GB	Home	Road
Atlanta Braves	96	66	.593	—	56‍–‍25	40‍–‍41
Montreal Expos	88	74	.543	8	50‍–‍31	38‍–‍43
Florida Marlins	80	82	.494	16	52‍–‍29	28‍–‍53
New York Mets	71	91	.438	25	42‍–‍39	29‍–‍52
Philadelphia Phillies	67	95	.414	29	35‍–‍46	32‍–‍49

NL Central
Team	W	L	Pct.	GB	Home	Road
St. Louis Cardinals	88	74	.543	—	48‍–‍33	40‍–‍41
Houston Astros	82	80	.506	6	48‍–‍33	34‍–‍47
Cincinnati Reds	81	81	.500	7	46‍–‍35	35‍–‍46
Chicago Cubs	76	86	.469	12	43‍–‍38	33‍–‍48
Pittsburgh Pirates	73	89	.451	15	36‍–‍44	37‍–‍45

NL West
Team	W	L	Pct.	GB	Home	Road
San Diego Padres	91	71	.562	—	45‍–‍36	46‍–‍35
Los Angeles Dodgers	90	72	.556	1	47‍–‍34	43‍–‍38
Colorado Rockies	83	79	.512	8	55‍–‍26	28‍–‍53
San Francisco Giants	68	94	.420	23	38‍–‍44	30‍–‍50

== Postseason ==
=== Bracket ===
Division Series (ALDS, NLDS)
East	NY Yankees	3
West	Texas	1
American League
WC	Baltimore	3
Central	Cleveland	1
East	Atlanta	3
WC	Los Angeles	0
National League
West	San Diego	0
Central	St. Louis	3

League Championship Series (ALCS, NLCS)
East	NY Yankees	4
WC	Baltimore	1
East	Atlanta	4
Central	St. Louis	3

World Series
AL	NY Yankees	4
NL	Atlanta	2

== Awards and honors ==
- Baseball Hall of Fame
  - Jim Bunning
  - Bill Foster
  - Ned Hanlon
  - Earl Weaver

Baseball Writers' Association of America Awards
BBWAA Award	National League	American League
Rookie of the Year	Todd Hollandsworth (LAD)	Derek Jeter (NYY)
Cy Young Award	John Smoltz (ATL)	Pat Hentgen (TOR)
Manager of the Year	Bruce Bochy (SD)	Johnny Oates (TEX); Joe Torre (NYY)
Most Valuable Player	Ken Caminiti (SD)	Juan González (TEX)
Gold Glove Awards
Position	National League	American League
Pitcher	Greg Maddux (ATL)	Mike Mussina (BAL)
Catcher	Charles Johnson (FLA)	Iván Rodríguez (TEX)
First Baseman	Mark Grace (CHC)	J. T. Snow (CAL)
Second Baseman	Craig Biggio (HOU)	Roberto Alomar (BAL)
Third Baseman	Ken Caminiti (SD)	Robin Ventura (CWS)
Shortstop	Barry Larkin (CIN)	Omar Vizquel (CLE)
Outfielders	Barry Bonds (SF)	Kenny Lofton (CLE)
Outfielders	Marquis Grissom (ATL)	Jay Buhner (SEA)
Outfielders	Steve Finley (SD)	Ken Griffey Jr. (SEA)
Silver Slugger Awards
Pitcher/Designated Hitter	Tom Glavine (ATL)	Paul Molitor (MIN)
Catcher	Mike Piazza (LAD)	Iván Rodríguez (TEX)
First Baseman	Andrés Galarraga (COL)	Mark McGwire (OAK)
Second Baseman	Eric Young (COL)	Roberto Alomar (BAL)
Third Baseman	Ken Caminiti (SD)	Jim Thome (CLE)
Shortstop	Barry Larkin (CIN)	Alex Rodriguez (SEA)
Outfielders	Barry Bonds (SF)	Albert Belle (CLE)
Outfielders	Ellis Burks (COL)	Juan González (TEX)
Outfielders	Gary Sheffield (FLA)	Ken Griffey Jr. (SEA)

=== Other awards ===
- Outstanding Designated Hitter Award: Paul Molitor (MIN)
- Roberto Clemente Award (Humanitarian): Kirby Puckett (MIN)
- Rolaids Relief Man Award: John Wetteland (NYY, American); Jeff Brantley (CIN, National)

=== Player of the Month ===
Month	American League	National League
April	Frank Thomas	Barry Bonds
May	Mo Vaughn	Jeff Bagwell
June	Mark McGwire	Dante Bichette
July	Juan González	Sammy Sosa
August	Alex Rodriguez	Ken Caminiti
September	Frank Thomas	Ken Caminiti

=== Pitcher of the Month ===
Month	American League	National League
April	Juan Guzmán	John Smoltz
May	Charles Nagy	John Smoltz
June	Orel Hershiser	Jeff Fassero
July	Pat Hentgen	Jeff Fassero
August	Pat Hentgen	Kevin Brown
September	Charles Nagy	Hideo Nomo

== MLB statistical leaders ==
Statistic	American League		National League	
AVG	Alex Rodriguez SEA	.358	Tony Gwynn SD	.353
HR	Mark McGwire OAK	52	Andrés Galarraga COL	47
RBI	Albert Belle CLE	148	Andrés Galarraga COL	150
Wins	Andy Pettitte NYY	21	John Smoltz ATL	24
ERA	Juan Guzmán TOR	2.93	Kevin Brown FLA	1.89
SO	Roger Clemens BOS	257	John Smoltz ATL	276
SV	John Wetteland NYY	43	Jeff Brantley CIN; Todd Worrell LAD	44
SB	Kenny Lofton CLE	75	Eric Young COL	53

== Managers ==
=== American League ===
Team	Manager	Notes
Baltimore Orioles	Davey Johnson	
Boston Red Sox	Kevin Kennedy	
California Angels	Marcel Lachemann, John McNamara, Joe Maddon	
Chicago White Sox	Terry Bevington	
Cleveland Indians	Mike Hargrove	
Detroit Tigers	Buddy Bell	
Kansas City Royals	Bob Boone	
Milwaukee Brewers	Phil Garner	
Minnesota Twins	Tom Kelly	
New York Yankees	Joe Torre	Won World Series
Oakland Athletics	Art Howe	
Seattle Mariners	Lou Piniella	
Texas Rangers	Johnny Oates	
Toronto Blue Jays	Cito Gaston	

=== National League ===
Team	Manager	Notes
Atlanta Braves	Bobby Cox	Won National League Pennant
Chicago Cubs	Jim Riggleman	
Cincinnati Reds	Ray Knight	
Colorado Rockies	Don Baylor	
Florida Marlins	Rene Lachemann, Cookie Rojas, John Boles	
Houston Astros	Terry Collins	
Los Angeles Dodgers	Tommy Lasorda, Bill Russell	
Montreal Expos	Felipe Alou	
New York Mets	Dallas Green, Bobby Valentine	
Philadelphia Phillies	Jim Fregosi	
Pittsburgh Pirates	Jim Leyland	
St. Louis Cardinals	Tony La Russa	
San Diego Padres	Bruce Bochy	
San Francisco Giants	Dusty Baker	

== Home field attendance and payroll ==
Team name	Wins	%±	Home attendance	%±	Per game	Est. payroll	%±
Colorado Rockies	83	7.8%	3,891,014	14.8%	48,037	$40,324,823	18.1%
Baltimore Orioles	88	23.9%	3,646,950	17.7%	44,475	$54,599,315	24.3%
Cleveland Indians	99	−1.0%	3,318,174	16.7%	41,477	$48,216,360	26.7%
Los Angeles Dodgers	90	15.4%	3,188,454	15.3%	39,364	$35,355,000	−10.0%
Atlanta Braves	96	6.7%	2,901,242	13.2%	35,818	$49,698,500	5.2%
Texas Rangers	90	21.6%	2,889,020	45.5%	35,667	$39,041,528	12.9%
Seattle Mariners	85	7.6%	2,723,850	65.8%	33,628	$41,328,501	13.3%
St. Louis Cardinals	88	41.9%	2,654,718	51.1%	32,774	$40,269,667	8.5%
Toronto Blue Jays	74	32.1%	2,559,573	−9.4%	31,600	$30,555,083	−39.6%
Boston Red Sox	85	−1.2%	2,315,231	7.0%	28,583	$42,393,500	30.6%
New York Yankees	92	16.5%	2,250,877	32.0%	28,136	$54,191,792	10.9%
Chicago Cubs	76	4.1%	2,219,110	15.7%	27,396	$33,081,000	12.1%
San Diego Padres	91	30.0%	2,187,886	110.0%	27,011	$28,348,172	7.5%
Houston Astros	82	7.9%	1,975,888	44.9%	24,394	$28,487,000	−16.6%
Cincinnati Reds	81	−4.7%	1,861,428	1.3%	22,981	$42,526,334	−1.4%
California Angels	70	−10.3%	1,820,521	4.1%	22,476	$28,847,000	−7.6%
Philadelphia Phillies	67	−2.9%	1,801,677	−11.8%	22,243	$34,314,500	12.3%
Florida Marlins	80	19.4%	1,746,767	2.7%	21,565	$31,132,000	27.0%
Chicago White Sox	85	25.0%	1,676,403	4.1%	20,696	$45,289,500	−3.6%
Montreal Expos	88	33.3%	1,616,709	23.4%	19,959	$16,264,500	30.4%
New York Mets	71	2.9%	1,588,323	24.8%	19,609	$24,479,500	−11.5%
Minnesota Twins	78	39.3%	1,437,352	35.9%	17,529	$23,117,000	−9.0%
Kansas City Royals	75	7.1%	1,435,997	16.4%	17,950	$20,281,250	−31.3%
San Francisco Giants	68	1.5%	1,413,922	13.9%	17,243	$37,144,725	1.9%
Pittsburgh Pirates	73	25.9%	1,332,150	47.1%	16,652	$23,017,500	25.4%
Milwaukee Brewers	80	23.1%	1,327,155	22.0%	16,385	$21,730,000	22.1%
Detroit Tigers	53	−11.7%	1,168,610	−1.0%	14,427	$23,438,000	−36.7%
Oakland Athletics	78	16.4%	1,148,380	−2.2%	14,178	$21,243,000	−43.7%

== Television coverage ==
This was the first season under new five-year rights agreements with ESPN, Fox and NBC. ESPN continued to air Sunday Night Baseball and Wednesday Night Baseball. Fox basically reinstated the Saturday afternoon Game of the Week with its own Fox Saturday Baseball broadcasts, initially offering up to four regionalized telecasts per week. NBC declined to broadcast any regular season games and instead agreed to a limited deal in which the network aired the All-Star Game and the American League Championship Series in even-numbered years, the World Series and National League Championship Series in odd-numbered years, and three Division Series games in each of these five years. Fox handled the All-Star Game and the American League Championship Series in odd-numbered years, the World Series and National League Championship Series in even-numbered years, and five Division Series games each year. ESPN then aired any Division Series games not picked up by either Fox or NBC.

Network	Day of week	Announcers
ESPN	Sunday nights Wednesday nights	Jon Miller, Joe Morgan See also: List of ESPN Major League Baseball broadcasters
Fox	Saturday afternoons	Joe Buck, Tim McCarver, Thom Brennaman, Bob Brenly See also: List of Major League Baseball on Fox broadcasters
NBC	None	Bob Costas, Joe Morgan, Bob Uecker

== Events ==
=== January–June ===
- January 8 – For only the seventh time in history and the first time since 1971, the Baseball Writers' Association of America fails to select a player for induction into the Baseball Hall of Fame.
- March 5 – The Veterans Committee elects four new members to the Hall of Fame and just misses naming a fifth. The group elected includes Earl Weaver, Baltimore Orioles manager for 17 seasons; pitcher Jim Bunning, who won 100 games in each league; 19th-century manager Ned Hanlon, who won pennants in Baltimore and Brooklyn, and Bill Foster, the Negro leagues' pitcher with most wins. Second baseman Nellie Fox receives the necessary 75% of the Committee's votes, but the rules allow for election of only one modern player, and Bunning has more votes.
- April 1 – Seven pitches into the first game of the season, at Riverfront Stadium in Cincinnati, home plate umpire John McSherry collapses on the field and dies of a massive heart attack. The game between the Cincinnati Reds and Montreal Expos is postponed, along with the rest of the games scheduled for that day. Reds owner Marge Schott later comes under fire for wanting the game in Cincinnati to continue despite the tragedy (and against the wishes of the players on both teams), saying that she felt "cheated" when it was canceled.
- April 6 – Cleveland Indians player Albert Belle hits Sports Illustrated photographer Tony Tomsic in the hand prior to a game between the Indians and Toronto Blue Jays at Jacobs Field. The angry Indians outfielder had told the photographer to stop taking pictures of him doing pre-game stretches and Tomsic complied. Belle then throws a ball from the outfield that breaks the skin of the photographer's hand in two places and draws blood.
- April 19 – The Texas Rangers set a major league record for most runs scored in the eighth inning, by scoring 19 runs against the Baltimore Orioles.
- May 14 – New York Yankee pitcher Dwight Gooden pitches the first Yankee Stadium no-hitter in 3 years as his Yankees beat the Seattle Mariners 3–0.
- May 17 – Baltimore Orioles catcher Chris Hoiles hits a walk-off grand slam against the Seattle Mariners in the bottom of the ninth, down by three, with two outs and a full count. This is only the second occurrence of this cliché ultimate game ending event in the history of professional baseball; during the 1988 season, Alan Trammell became the first to accomplish this feat in a 7–6 comeback win over the Yankees.
- June 1 – Major League Baseball games begin to be broadcast on Fox.
- June 6 – The Boston Red Sox beat the Chicago White Sox 7–4, as John Valentin of Boston hits for the cycle and the White Sox complete a triple play. It marks the first time since July 1, 1931, that both events occur in the same game.

=== July–December ===
- July 9 – At Veterans Stadium, the National League defeats the American League 6–0 in the All-Star Game. Ken Caminiti and Mike Piazza hit home runs for the winners. The game is the first All-Star contest in which no walks are issued by either team. The Orioles' Cal Ripken Jr. starts the game, despite suffering a broken nose when he accidentally catches a forearm from White Sox reliever Roberto Hernández when the latter slips on the tarp during the AL team photo shoot.
- September 6 – Eddie Murray of the Baltimore Orioles becomes the 15th player in major league history to hit 500 home runs. He homers off Felipe Lira in the seventh inning of the Orioles' 5–4, 12-inning loss to the Detroit Tigers at Camden Yards. Murray also joins Hank Aaron and Willie Mays as the only big leaguers to reach both this milestone and also the 3,000 hit mark.
- September 6 – Brett Butler returns to the Los Angeles Dodgers line-up four months after having surgery for throat cancer. The 39-year-old center fielder scores the decisive run in a 2–1 victory over the Pittsburgh Pirates.
- September 16 – Paul Molitor of the Minnesota Twins became the 21st member of the 3,000-hit club with a triple in the fifth inning against the Kansas City Royals.
- September 17 – Hideo Nomo pitches a no-hitter against the Colorado Rockies, leading the Los Angeles Dodgers to a 9–0 victory. Nomo walks four batters and strikes out eight.
- September 18 – Roger Clemens of the Boston Red Sox ties a Major League record (matching his own 1986 feat) for most strikeouts in a single nine-inning game, throwing 20 strikeouts in a 4–0 win against the Detroit Tigers.
- October 24 – The Atlanta Braves play their final game at Atlanta–Fulton County Stadium vs. the New York Yankees.
- October 26 – The New York Yankees take their fourth victory in a row from the Atlanta Braves, 3–2, giving them the 1996 World Series and their 23rd World Championship. Starter Jimmy Key gets the win with help from closer John Wetteland, whose four saves earn him the MVP trophy.

== Movies ==
- Ed
- Soul of the Game (TV)
- The Fan

== Deaths ==
- February 8 – Del Ennis, 70, All-Star left fielder for the Phillies who had seven 100-RBI seasons, leading the NL for the 1950 "Whiz Kids" team, and was the team's career home run leader (259) until 1980
- February 19 – Charles O. Finley, 77, owner of the Athletics from 1960 to 1981 who moved the team from Kansas City to Oakland, and was known for numerous gimmicks and controversies; won three straight World Series from 1972–74
- March 8 – Bill Nicholson, 81, 5-time All-Star right fielder for the Cubs and Phillies who twice led the NL in home runs and RBI
- April 1 – John McSherry, 51, National League umpire since 1971 who worked in eight NLCS and two World Series
- May 3 – Alex Kellner, 71, an All-Star pitcher who played for the Athletics, Reds and Cardinals between 1948 and 1959
- May 19 – Johnny Berardino, 79, infielder for the Browns and Indians who topped 80 RBI in 1940 and 1941; became an actor, best known for the soap opera General Hospital
- May 26 – Mike Sharperson, 34, All-Star infielder for the Dodgers who batted .300 in 1992
- June 16 – Mel Allen, 83, broadcaster who spent over 35 years with the Yankees, also on national broadcasts and This Week in Baseball
- July 8 – Jim Busby, 69, All-Star center fielder for six teams who batted .312 for 1953 Senators, led AL in putouts twice; later a coach
- August 4 – Willard Brown, 81, All-Star outfielder of the Negro leagues who became the first black player to hit a home run in the American League
- September 4 – Babe Dahlgren, 84, All-Star first baseman best remembered for replacing Lou Gehrig to end his 2,130 consecutive games streak, hitting a home run in the game
- September 6 – Barney McCosky, 79, outfielder for the Tigers and Athletics who batted .312 lifetime, led AL in hits in 1940
- October 4 – Joe Hoerner, 59, All-Star reliever for seven teams who averaged 15 saves for 1966–69 Cardinals
- October 29 – Ewell Blackwell, 74, six-time All-Star pitcher for the Cincinnati Reds who came within two outs of throwing consecutive no-hitters in 1947; led NL in wins and strikeouts that season
- November 11 – Lum Harris, 81, manager who won 1969 NL West title with the Braves; previously a pitcher for the Athletics, and Houston manager
- December 27 – Gene Brabender, 55, pitcher who led the Seattle Pilots with 13 wins in their only season
