= 1997 Pittsburgh Pirates season =

1997 Pittsburgh Pirates
- League: National League
- Division: Central
- Ballpark: Three Rivers Stadium
- City: Pittsburgh, Pennsylvania
- Record: 79–83 (.488)
- Divisional place: 2nd
- Owners: Kevin McClatchy
- General managers: Cam Bonifay
- Managers: Gene Lamont
- Television: WPGH-TV & WPTT-TV; Fox Sports Net Pittsburgh
- Radio: KDKA-AM (Steve Blass, Greg Brown, Lanny Frattare, Bob Walk)

The 1997 Pittsburgh Pirates season was the 116th season of the franchise; the 111th in the National League. This was their 28th season at Three Rivers Stadium. The Pirates finished second in the National League Central with a record of 79–83.

== Offseason ==
- October 4, 1996: The Pirates promote 3rd base coach Gene Lamont to manager, after Jim Leyland resigned after the 1996 season.
- November 14, 1996: Dan Plesac, Carlos García and Orlando Merced were traded by the Pirates to the Toronto Blue Jays for José Silva, Brandon Cromer (minors), Jose Pett (minors), and players to be named later. The Blue Jays completed the deal by sending Abraham Núñez, Craig Wilson, and Mike Halperin (minors) to the Pirates on December 11.
- December 13, 1996: Jay Bell and Jeff King were traded by the Pirates to the Kansas City Royals for Jeff Granger, Joe Randa, Jeff Wallace, and Jeff Martin (minors).
- December 20, 1996: Kevin Elster was signed as a free agent with the Pittsburgh Pirates.

== New stadium referendum ==
Perhaps the most interesting headline of the Pirates' 1997 season didn't occur on the field. In 1997 voters in Pittsburgh's Allegheny County and 10 surrounding counties were presented with a referendum, known as the Regional Renaissance Initiative, to raise their county sales tax by 1/2% for seven years to fund, among other things, new stadiums for the Pirates and Pittsburgh Steelers. Both teams were playing in Three Rivers Stadium, which at the time was considered by many to be obsolete. The unexpected pennant drive provided a backdrop for the question as it was debated throughout the summer, given the concern that the Pirates might leave the city if a new stadium wasn't procured.

The referendum failed badly in all 11 counties. Only in Allegheny County was it close (58–42), while being rejected by 2–1 to 3–1 margins in other counties. The next year what became known as "Plan B" was pursued by local and state government officials which called again for two new stadiums as well as an expansion of the David L. Lawrence Convention Center. The new plan was eventually passed, this time without a referendum and despite polls showing the public was against this as well, resulting in the construction of PNC Park and Heinz Field, where both teams would start playing in 2001.

== Regular season ==
The 1997 Pittsburgh Pirates were informally known as "The Freak Show," as the team of rookies and cheap veterans (the team only had a $9 million payroll) unexpectedly competed with the Houston Astros for the division title until the final week of the season.

=== Season standings ===
NL Central
Team	W	L	Pct.	GB	Home	Road
Houston Astros	84	78	.519	—	46‍–‍35	38‍–‍43
Pittsburgh Pirates	79	83	.488	5	43‍–‍38	36‍–‍45
Cincinnati Reds	76	86	.469	8	40‍–‍41	36‍–‍45
St. Louis Cardinals	73	89	.451	11	41‍–‍40	32‍–‍49
Chicago Cubs	68	94	.420	16	42‍–‍39	26‍–‍55

=== Game log ===
1997 Game Log (79–83)
April (12–13)

#	Date	Opponent	Score	Win	Loss	Save	Attendance	Record
1	April 1	@ Giants	5–2	**Ruebel** (1–0)	Rodriguez	**Ericks** (1)	41,996	1–0
2	April 3	@ Giants	5–7	Fernandez	**Cooke** (0–1)	Beck	8,099	1–1
3	April 4	@ Dodgers	3–5	Candiotti	**Wainhouse** (0–1)	Worrell	37,284	1–2
4	April 5	@ Dodgers	3–1	**Cordova** (1–0)	Park	**Ericks** (2)	41,099	2–2
5	April 6	@ Dodgers	3–6	Dreifort	**Rincon** (0–1)	Worrell	37,493	2–3
6	April 7	@ Padres	2–3 (10)	Veras	**Ruebel** (1–1)	—	29,895	2–4
7	April 8	@ Padres	2–0	**Cooke** (1–1)	Bergman	**Ericks** (3)	14,278	3–4
8	April 9	@ Padres	4–2	**Loaiza** (1–0)	Worrell	**Ericks** (4)	24,735	4–4
9	April 11	Dodgers	1–7	Martinez	**Cordova** (1–1)	—	43,126	4–5
10	April 13	Dodgers	5–14	Nomo	**Schmidt** (0–1)	—	14,885	4–6
11	April 15	Padres	3–2	**Ericks** (1–0)	Ashby	—	6,851	5–6
12	April 16	Padres	5–7	Valenzuela	**Cooke** (1–2)	Hoffman	6,777	5–7
13	April 17	Reds	3–2	**Loaiza** (2–0)	Morgan	**Ericks** (5)	6,039	6–7
14	April 18	Reds	1–6	Burba	**Cordova** (1–2)	—	9,082	6–8
15	April 19	Reds	6–5	**Rincon** (1–1)	Remlinger	—	11,457	7–8
16	April 20	Reds	5–3	**Lieber** (1–0)	Mercker	**Ericks** (6)	14,542	8–8
17	April 21	Phillies	2–10	Schilling	**Cooke** (1–3)	—	9,015	8–9
18	April 23	Phillies	3–2	**Rincon** (2–1)	Spradlin	—	8,850	9–9
19	April 24	@ Cubs	4–3	**Loiselle** (1–0)	Rojas	—	21,787	10–9
20	April 25	@ Cubs	1–11	Foster	**Lieber** (1–1)	—	18,333	10–10
21	April 26	@ Cubs	6–7	Patterson	**Rincon** (2–2)	Rojas	29,323	10–11
22	April 27	@ Cubs	7–0	**Schmidt** (1–1)	Telemaco	—	21,083	11–11
23	April 28	@ Phillies	9–4 (12)	**Wilkins** (1–0)	Mimbs	—	12,017	12–11
24	April 29	@ Phillies	2–8	Maduro	**Ruebel** (1–2)	—	12,453	12–12
25	April 30	Giants	1–6	Gardner	**Lieber** (1–2)	—	10,073	12–13

May (14–14)

#	Date	Opponent	Score	Win	Loss	Save	Attendance	Record
26	May 1	Giants	3–2	**Cooke** (2–3)	Estes	**Rincon** (1)	10,507	13–13
27	May 2	@ Braves	3–2	**Peters** (1–0)	Bielecki	**Loiselle** (1)	37,577	14–13
28	May 3	@ Braves	3–0	**Loaiza** (3–0)	Glavine	**Rincon** (2)	46,602	15–13
29	May 4	@ Braves	1–3	Wade	**Cordova** (1–3)	Wohlers	42,037	15–14
30	May 5	@ Marlins	0–3	Helling	**Lieber** (1–3)	Nen	16,616	15–15
31	May 6	@ Marlins	4–0	**Cooke** (3–3)	Fernandez	—	18,063	16–15
32	May 7	@ Rockies	14–3	**Wilkins** (2–0)	Thompson	—	48,056	17–15
33	May 8	@ Rockies	10–8	**Loaiza** (4–0)	Wright	**Loiselle** (2)	48,050	18–15
34	May 9	Braves	9–0	**Cordova** (2–3)	Wade	—	18,006	19–15
35	May 10	Braves	3–9	Neagle	**Lieber** (1–4)	—	34,143	19–16
36	May 11	Braves	2–8	Smoltz	**Cooke** (3–4)	—	29,895	19–17
37	May 12	Braves	2–10	Maddux	**Schmidt** (1–2)	—	12,114	19–18
38	May 14	Rockies	15–10	**Wilkins** (3–0)	Reed	—	11,841	20–18
39	May 15	Rockies	4–3	**Cordova** (3–3)	Bailey	**Rincon** (3)	8,548	21–18
40	May 16	Marlins	1–3	Fernandez	**Lieber** (1–5)	Nen	17,156	21–19
41	May 17	Marlins	1–11	Rapp	**Cooke** (3–5)	—	32,066	21–20
42	May 18	Marlins	3–5 (10)	Nen	**Loiselle** (1–1)	Stanifer	28,702	21–21
43	May 20	@ Cardinals	1–3	Jackson	**Loaiza** (4–1)	Eckersley	25,990	21–22
44	May 21	@ Cardinals	3–2	**Ruebel** (2–2)	Fossas	**Loiselle** (3)	34,738	22–22
45	May 22	@ Expos	9–3	**Lieber** (2–5)	Perez	**Rincon** (4)	12,620	23–22
46	May 23	@ Expos	1–4	Martinez	**Cooke** (3–6)	—	18,499	23–23
47	May 24	@ Expos	3–7	Juden	**Schmidt** (1–3)	Urbina	26,154	23–24
48	May 25	@ Expos	8–6	**Wilkins** (4–0)	Daal	**Loiselle** (4)	27,253	24–24
49	May 26	Cubs	1–2	Foster	**Cordova** (3–4)	Adams	20,609	24–25
50	May 27	Cubs	7–8	Gonzalez	**Lieber** (2–6)	Adams	9,641	24–26
51	May 28	Cubs	4–1	**Cooke** (4–6)	Mulholland	—	10,198	25–26
52	May 30	Expos	10–2	**Peters** (2–0)	Juden	—	14,676	26–26
53	May 31	Expos	2–4	Hermanson	**Loaiza** (4–2)	Urbina	14,628	26–27

June (11–16)

#	Date	Opponent	Score	Win	Loss	Save	Attendance	Record
54	June 1	Expos	11–2	**Cordova** (4–4)	Bullinger	—	25,752	27–27
55	June 2	@ Cubs	2–3	Mulholland	**Lieber** (2–7)	Adams	21,773	27–28
56	June 3	@ Cubs	3–1	**Cooke** (5–6)	Trachsel	**Loiselle** (5)	17,317	28–28
57	June 4	Cardinals	0–10	Benes	**Schmidt** (1–4)	—	19,181	28–29
58	June 5	Cardinals	9–3	**Loaiza** (5–2)	Stottlemyre	—	11,382	29–29
59	June 6	Phillies	5–4 (10)	**Wilkins** (5–0)	Spradlin	—	15,165	30–29
60	June 7	Phillies	9–2	**Lieber** (3–7)	Nye	—	25,664	31–29
61	June 8	Phillies	2–3	Schilling	**Cooke** (5–7)	Bottalico	30,667	31–30
62	June 10	@ Reds	5–8	Remlinger	**Rincon** (2–3)	Shaw	18,556	31–31
63	June 11	@ Reds	1–2	Tomko	**Loaiza** (5–3)	Shaw	20,854	31–32
64	June 13	Royals	5–3	**Cordova** (5–4)	Williams	**Loiselle** (6)	33,253	32–32
65	June 14	Royals	3–8	Belcher	**Lieber** (3–8)	Montgomery	39,509	32–33
66	June 15	Royals	1–8	Appier	**Cooke** (5–8)	—	35,774	32–34
67	June 16	@ Twins	8–6	**Schmidt** (2–4)	Aldred	**Loiselle** (7)	16,007	33–34
68	June 17	@ Twins	1–13	Hawkins	**Loaiza** (5–4)	—	14,894	33–35
69	June 18	@ Twins	2–8	Radke	**Cordova** (5–5)	—	15,688	33–36
70	June 19	@ Mets	6–7	Franco	**Rincon** (2–4)	—	15,492	33–37
71	June 20	@ Mets	0–1	Jones	**Cooke** (5–9)	Franco	18,737	33–38
72	June 21	@ Mets	2–3	Mlicki	**Wilkins** (5–1)	McMichael	32,908	33–39
73	June 22	@ Mets	9–12 (10)	Kashiwada	**Peters** (2–1)	—	23,247	33–40
74	June 23	@ Astros	6–0	**Cordova** (6–5)	Garcia	—	16,738	34–40
75	June 24	@ Astros	8–3	**Lieber** (4–8)	Wall	—	17,972	35–40
76	June 25	@ Astros	1–5	Kile	**Sodowsky** (0–1)	—	26,954	35–41
77	June 27	Mets	6–1	**Schmidt** (3–4)	Mlicki	—	18,103	36–41
78	June 28	Mets	3–8	Reynoso	**Loaiza** (5–5)	—	23,711	36–42
79	June 29	Mets	8–10	Jordan	**Peters** (2–2)	Franco	26,499	36–43
80	June 30	White Sox	3–1	**Lieber** (5–8)	Darwin	—	28,070	37–43

July (16–12)

#	Date	Opponent	Score	Win	Loss	Save	Attendance	Record
81	July 1	White Sox	3–0	**Cooke** (6–9)	Baldwin	**Loiselle** (8)	22,163	38–43
82	July 2	White Sox	3–1	**Schmidt** (4–4)	Navarro	—	25,772	39–43
83	July 3	@ Cardinals	6–4	**Loaiza** (6–5)	Valenzuela	**Loiselle** (9)	30,753	40–43
84	July 4	@ Cardinals	7–5 (10)	**Wilkins** (6–1)	Eckersley	**Loiselle** (10)	33,885	41–43
85	July 5	@ Cardinals	4–3	**Lieber** (6–8)	Morris	**Wilkins** (1)	39,593	42–43
86	July 6	@ Cardinals	6–3	**Cooke** (7–9)	Stottlemyre	—	29,290	43–43
87	July 10	Astros	0–7	Kile	**Schmidt** (4–5)	—	17,335	43–44
88	July 11	Astros	0–10	Hampton	**Loaiza** (6–6)	—	21,913	43–45
89	July 12	Astros	3–0 (10)	**Rincon** (3–4)	Hudek	—	44,119	44–45
90	July 13	Astros	5–3	**Sodowsky** (1–1)	Springer	**Loiselle** (11)	25,675	45–45
91	July 14	Mets	5–4	**Rincon** (4–4)	McMichael	**Loiselle** (12)	12,794	46–45
92	July 15	Mets	4–3	**Christiansen** (1–0)	Acevedo	**Loiselle** (13)	12,244	47–45
93	July 16	Reds	3–7	Burba	**Loaiza** (6–7)	—	30,698	47–46
94	July 17	Reds	5–9	Smiley	**Cordova** (6–6)	—	19,710	47–47
95	July 18	@ Phillies	6–8	Leiter	**Lieber** (6–9)	Bottalico	19,676	47–48
96	July 19	@ Phillies	13–3	**Cooke** (8–9)	Green	—	17,472	48–48
97	July 20	@ Phillies	1–4	Stephenson	**Schmidt** (4–6)	Bottalico	20,431	48–49
98	July 21	@ Phillies	3–2	**Loaiza** (7–7)	Schilling	**Loiselle** (14)	19,303	49–49
99	July 22	@ Padres	2–3	Hoffman	**Loiselle** (1–2)	—	18,306	49–50
100	July 23	@ Padres	1–9	Smith	**Lieber** (6–10)	—	16,151	49–51
101	July 24	@ Padres	6–8	Bruske	**Sodowsky** (1–2)	Hoffman	18,715	49–52
102	July 25	@ Giants	5–2	**Schmidt** (5–6)	Rueter	**Loiselle** (15)	14,236	50–52
103	July 26	@ Giants	10–3	**Loaiza** (8–7)	Creek	—	25,962	51–52
104	July 27	@ Giants	5–6 (13)	Henry	**Wilkins** (6–2)	—	0	51–53
105	July 27	@ Giants	10–7	**Cordova** (7–6)	VanLandingham	—	38,866	52–53
106	July 28	@ Dodgers	2–4	Valdez	**Lieber** (6–11)	Worrell	53,503	52–54
107	July 29	@ Dodgers	1–3	Astacio	**Cooke** (8–10)	Worrell	43,791	52–55
108	July 31	Rockies	4–1	**Schmidt** (6–6)	Bailey	**Loiselle** (16)	16,654	53–55

August (15–14)

#	Date	Opponent	Score	Win	Loss	Save	Attendance	Record
109	August 1	Rockies	6–7	Reed	**Rincon** (4–5)	Dipoto	22,657	53–56
110	August 2	Rockies	6–5	**Cordova** (8–6)	Swift	**Loiselle** (17)	32,388	54–56
111	August 3	Rockies	8–4	**Ruebel** (3–2)	Reed	—	24,989	55–56
112	August 4	Braves	0–6	Smoltz	**Cooke** (8–11)	—	21,609	55–57
113	August 5	Braves	5–4	**Schmidt** (7–6)	Glavine	**Loiselle** (18)	20,069	56–57
114	August 6	Marlins	3–12	Brown	**Loaiza** (8–8)	—	32,594	56–58
115	August 7	Marlins	5–1	**Wilkins** (7–2)	Leiter	—	18,042	57–58
116	August 8	@ Rockies	3–5	Wright	**Lieber** (6–12)	Dipoto	48,262	57–59
117	August 9	@ Rockies	7–8	Munoz	**Rincon** (4–6)	—	48,323	57–60
118	August 10	@ Rockies	7–8	Leskanic	**Wilkins** (7–3)	Dipoto	48,018	57–61
119	August 12	@ Braves	5–2	**Sodowsky** (2–2)	Wohlers	**Loiselle** (19)	42,435	58–61
120	August 13	@ Braves	2–1	**Lieber** (7–12)	Smoltz	**Loiselle** (20)	40,793	59–61
121	August 15	@ Marlins	5–6	Powell	**Loiselle** (1–3)	—	26,092	59–62
122	August 16	@ Marlins	10–5	**Cordova** (9–6)	Saunders	—	40,031	60–62
123	August 17	@ Marlins	2–10	Brown	**Cooke** (8–12)	—	38,221	60–63
124	August 18	@ Marlins	7–2	**Loaiza** (9–8)	Alfonseca	—	30,200	61–63
125	August 19	Padres	5–3	**Lieber** (8–12)	Smith	**Loiselle** (21)	12,411	62–63
126	August 20	Padres	7–3	**Schmidt** (8–6)	Ashby	—	10,222	63–63
127	August 21	Padres	4–9	Hitchcock	**Cordova** (9–7)	—	13,129	63–64
128	August 22	Giants	3–2	**Cooke** (9–12)	Rueter	**Loiselle** (22)	18,562	64–64
129	August 23	Giants	6–4	**Loaiza** (10–8)	Darwin	**Loiselle** (23)	42,502	65–64
130	August 24	Giants	9–6	**Christiansen** (2–0)	Henry	**Wilkins** (2)	33,363	66–64
131	August 25	Dodgers	2–8	Martinez	**Schmidt** (8–7)	Guthrie	0	66–65
132	August 25	Dodgers	4–3	**Wilkins** (8–3)	Worrell	—	14,018	67–65
133	August 26	Dodgers	4–6	Dreifort	**Rincon** (4–7)	—	13,689	67–66
134	August 27	Dodgers	5–9	Reyes	**Cooke** (9–13)	—	48,032	67–67
135	August 29	@ Brewers	1–4	Karl	**Loaiza** (10–9)	Jones	17,539	67–68
136	August 30	@ Brewers	3–1	**Lieber** (9–12)	Mercedes	**Loiselle** (24)	23,673	68–68
137	August 31	@ Brewers	2–3	Jones	**Wilkins** (8–4)	—	32,541	68–69

September (11–14)

#	Date	Opponent	Score	Win	Loss	Save	Attendance	Record
138	September 1	Indians	5–7	Ogea	**Cooke** (9–14)	Mesa	45,298	68–70
139	September 2	Indians	6–4	**Silva** (1–0)	Wright	**Loiselle** (25)	43,380	69–70
140	September 3	Indians	3–7	Hershiser	**Loaiza** (10–10)	—	37,513	69–71
141	September 4	@ Reds	2–5	Morgan	**Lieber** (9–13)	Shaw	15,136	69–72
142	September 5	@ Reds	6–8	Sullivan	**Wilkins** (8–5)	Shaw	21,492	69–73
143	September 6	@ Reds	13–4	**Cordova** (10–7)	Remlinger	—	20,383	70–73
144	September 7	@ Reds	3–6	Burba	**Silva** (1–1)	Shaw	19,682	70–74
145	September 9	@ Expos	4–5 (10)	Urbina	**Loiselle** (1–4)	—	8,782	70–75
146	September 10	@ Expos	4–5	Martinez	**Lieber** (9–14)	Urbina	10,139	70–76
147	September 12	Cubs	3–1	**Schmidt** (9–7)	Batista	**Loiselle** (26)	13,833	71–76
148	September 13	Cubs	1–4	Trachsel	**Cordova** (10–8)	Adams	21,505	71–77
149	September 14	Cubs	2–3	Clark	**Rincon** (4–8)	Adams	20,120	71–78
150	September 15	Expos	5–4 (10)	**Wilkins** (9–5)	Telford	—	7,736	72–78
151	September 16	Expos	8–2	**Lieber** (10–14)	Johnson	—	8,010	73–78
152	September 17	Astros	4–8	Reynolds	**Schmidt** (9–8)	—	27,422	73–79
153	September 18	Astros	12–3	**Cordova** (11–8)	Kile	—	14,852	74–79
154	September 19	Cardinals	5–6 (11)	King	**Loiselle** (1–5)	Eckersley	16,235	74–80
155	September 20	Cardinals	10–1	**Loaiza** (11–10)	Beltran	—	21,053	75–80
156	September 21	Cardinals	14–2	**Lieber** (11–14)	Busby	—	26,247	76–80
157	September 22	Cardinals	3–1	**Schmidt** (10–8)	Morris	**Loiselle** (27)	17,919	77–80
158	September 23	@ Mets	5–4	**Silva** (2–1)	Lidle	**Loiselle** (28)	14,670	78–80
159	September 24	@ Mets	5–7	Crawford	**Cooke** (9–15)	Rojas	13,195	78–81
160	September 26	@ Astros	0–2	Garcia	**Loaiza** (11–11)	Wagner	37,850	78–82
161	September 27	@ Astros	1–8	Reynolds	**Schmidt** (10–9)	—	36,170	78–83
162	September 28	@ Astros	5–4 (11)	**Christiansen** (3–0)	Henriquez	**Loiselle** (29)	30,606	79–83

Legend: = Win = Loss
Bold = Pirates team member

=== Record vs. opponents ===
1997 National League record Source: MLB Standings Grid – 1997
Team	ATL	CHC	CIN	COL	FLA	HOU	LAD	MON	NYM	PHI	PIT	SD	SF	STL	AL
Atlanta	—	9–2	9–2	5–6	4–8	7–4	6–5	10–2	5–7	10–2	5–6	8–3	7–4	8–3	8–7
Chicago	2–9	—	7–5	2–9	2–9	3–9	5–6	4–7	6–5	6–5	7–5	6–5	5–6	4–8	9–6
Cincinnati	2–9	5–7	—	5–6	5–6	5–7	6–5	6–5	2–9	8–3	8–4	5–6	4–7	6–6	9–6
Colorado	6–5	9–2	6–5	—	7–4	5–6	5–7	7–4	6–5	4–7	4–7	4–8	4–8	7–4	9–7
Florida	8–4	9–2	6–5	4–7	—	7–4	7–4	7–5	4–8	6–6	7–4	5–6	5–6	5–6	12–3
Houston	4–7	9–3	7–5	6–5	4–7	—	7–4	8–3	7–4	4–7	6–6	6–5	3–8	9–3	4–11
Los Angeles	5–6	6–5	5–6	7–5	4–7	4–7	—	7–4	6–5	10–1	9–2	5–7	6–6	5–6	9–7
Montreal	2–10	7–4	5–6	4–7	5–7	3–8	4–7	—	5–7	6–6	5–6	8–3	6–5	6–5	12–3
New York	7–5	5–6	9–2	5–6	8–4	4–7	5–6	7–5	—	7–5	7–4	5–6	3–8	9–2	7–8
Philadelphia	2–10	5–6	3–8	7–4	6–6	7–4	1–10	6–6	5–7	—	5–6	7–4	3–8	6–5	5–10
Pittsburgh	6–5	5–7	4–8	7–4	4–7	6–6	2–9	6–5	4–7	6–5	—	5–6	8–3	9–3	7–8
San Diego	3–8	5–6	6–5	8–4	6–5	5–6	7–5	3–8	6–5	4–7	6–5	—	4–8	5–6	8–8
San Francisco	4–7	6–5	7–4	8–4	6–5	8–3	6–6	5–6	8–3	8–3	3–8	8–4	—	3–8	10–6
St. Louis	3–8	8–4	6–6	4–7	6–5	3–9	6–5	5–6	2–9	5–6	3–9	6–5	8–3	—	8–7

=== Detailed records ===
**National League**
Opponent	W	L	WP	RS	RA
**NL East**
Atlanta Braves	6	5	0.545	35	45
Florida Marlins	4	7	0.364	41	58
Montreal Expos	6	5	0.545	65	44
New York Mets	4	7	0.364	53	60
Philadelphia Phillies	6	5	0.545	55	50
Total	26	29	0.473	249	257
**NL Central**
Chicago Cubs	5	7	0.417	41	44
Cincinnati Reds	4	8	0.333	53	65
Houston Astros	6	6	0.500	45	53
St. Louis Cardinals	9	3	0.750	68	43
Total	24	24	0.500	207	205
**NL West**
Colorado Rockies	7	4	0.636	84	62
Los Angeles Dodgers	2	9	0.182	33	66
San Diego Padres	5	6	0.455	41	49
San Francisco Giants	8	3	0.727	62	47
Total	22	22	0.500	220	224
**American League**
Chicago White Sox	3	0	1.000	9	2
Cleveland Indians	1	2	0.333	14	18
Kansas City Royals	1	2	0.333	9	19
Milwaukee Brewers	1	2	0.333	6	8
Minnesota Twins	1	2	0.333	11	27
Total	7	8	0.467	49	74
Season Total	79	83	0.488	725	760

Month	Games	Won	Lost	Win %	RS	RA
April	25	12	13	0.480	91	123
May	28	14	14	0.500	127	122
June	27	11	16	0.407	119	135
July	28	16	12	0.571	123	122
August	29	15	14	0.517	136	147
September	25	11	14	0.440	129	111
Total	162	79	83	0.488	725	760

	Games	Won	Lost	Win %	RS	RA
Home	81	43	38	0.531	365	395
Away	81	36	45	0.444	360	365
Total	162	79	83	0.488	725	760

== Roster ==
1997 Pittsburgh Pirates
Roster
Pitchers: 41 Jason Christiansen; 26 Steve Cooke; 67 Francisco Córdova; 71 Elmer Dessens; 57 John Ericks; 39 Jeff Granger; 36 Jason Johnson; 47 Jon Lieber; 34 Esteban Loaiza; 51 Rich Loiselle; 55 Ramón Morel; 38 Chris Peters; 73 Ricardo Rincón; 49 Matt Ruebel; 42 Jason Schmidt; 56 José Silva; 63 Clint Sodowsky; 43 Paul Wagner; 53 Dave Wainhouse; 39 Jeff Wallace; 35 Marc Wilkins	Catchers: 18 Jason Kendall; 15 Keith Osik; Infielders: 6 Lou Collier; 3 Shawon Dunston; 10 Kevin Elster; 22 Freddy García; 36 Mark Johnson; 48 Abraham Núñez; 2 Kevin Polcovich; 16 Joe Randa; 17 Dale Sveum; 30 Eddie Williams; 5 Tony Womack; 29 Kevin Young	Outfielders: 46 Jermaine Allensworth; 13 Adrian Brown; 19 Emil Brown; 30 Midre Cummings; 11 José Guillén; 28 Al Martin; 25 Mark Smith; 12 Turner Ward	Manager: 32 Gene Lamont; Coaches: 37 Joe Jones (first base); 45 Jack Lind (third base); 23 Lloyd McClendon (hitting); 44 Rick Renick (bench); 50 Pete Vuckovich (pitching); 54 Spin Williams (bullpen)

=== Opening Day lineup ===
Opening Day Starters
#	Name	Position
5	Tony Womack	2B
46	Jermaine Allensworth	CF
28	Al Martin	LF
36	Mark Johnson	1B
10	Kevin Elster	SS
18	Jason Kendall	C
11	José Guillén	RF
16	Joe Randa	3B
47	Jon Lieber	SP

== Player stats ==
Batting

Note: G = Games played; AB = At bats; H = Hits; Avg. = Batting average; HR = Home runs; RBI = Runs batted in

Regular season
Player	G	AB	H	Avg.	HR	RBI
C. Sodowsky	45	2	1	0.500	0	0
S. Dunston	18	71	28	0.394	5	16
T. Ward	71	167	59	0.353	7	33
J. Randa	126	443	134	0.302	7	60
K. Young	97	333	100	0.300	18	74
J. Kendall	144	486	143	0.294	8	49
A. Martin	113	423	123	0.291	13	59
M. Smith	71	193	55	0.285	9	35
T. Womack	155	641	178	0.278	6	50
K. Polcovich	84	245	67	0.273	4	21
J. Guillén	143	498	133	0.267	14	70
D. Sveum	126	306	80	0.261	12	47
K. Osik	49	105	27	0.257	0	7
J. Allensworth	108	369	94	0.255	3	43
C. Peters	31	4	1	0.250	0	2
E. Williams	30	89	22	0.247	3	11
A. Núñez	19	40	9	0.225	0	6
K. Elster	39	138	31	0.225	7	25
M. Johnson	78	219	47	0.215	4	29
A. Brown	48	147	28	0.190	1	10
M. Cummings	52	106	20	0.189	3	8
E. Brown	66	95	17	0.179	2	6
E. Loaiza	33	60	10	0.167	0	5
F. García	20	40	6	0.150	3	5
J. Silva	11	7	1	0.143	0	0
L. Collier	18	37	5	0.135	0	3
J. Lieber	33	58	7	0.121	0	8
J. Schmidt	32	56	6	0.107	0	2
F. Córdova	29	56	5	0.089	0	0
S. Cooke	32	52	3	0.058	0	1
J. Johnson	3	1	0	0.000	0	0
R. Loiselle	72	1	0	0.000	0	0
R. Rincón	62	1	0	0.000	0	0
M. Ruebel	44	7	0	0.000	0	0
P. Wagner	14	1	0	0.000	0	0
D. Wainhouse	25	2	0	0.000	0	0
M. Wilkins	70	4	0	0.000	0	1
J. Christiansen	39	0	0	—	0	0
E. Dessens	3	0	0	—	0	0
J. Ericks	10	0	0	—	0	0
J. Granger	9	0	0	—	0	0
R. Morel	5	0	0	—	0	0
J. Wallace	11	0	0	—	0	0
Team totals	162	5,503	1,440	0.262	129	686

Pitching

Note: G = Games pitched; IP = Innings pitched; W = Wins; L = Losses; ERA = Earned run average; SO = Strikeouts

Regular season
Player	G	IP	W	L	ERA	SO
E. Dessens	3	3 1/3	0	0	0.00	2
J. Wallace	11	12	0	0	0.75	14
J. Ericks	10	9 1/3	1	0	1.93	6
J. Christiansen	39	33 2/3	3	0	2.94	37
R. Loiselle	72	72 2/3	1	5	3.10	66
R. Rincón	62	60	4	8	3.45	71
F. Córdova	29	178 2/3	11	8	3.63	121
C. Sodowsky	45	52	2	2	3.63	51
M. Wilkins	70	75 2/3	9	5	3.69	47
P. Wagner	14	16	0	0	3.94	9
E. Loaiza	33	196 1/3	11	11	4.13	122
S. Cooke	32	167 1/3	9	15	4.30	109
J. Lieber	33	188 1/3	11	14	4.49	160
C. Peters	31	37 1/3	2	2	4.58	17
J. Schmidt	32	187 2/3	10	9	4.60	136
R. Morel	5	2/3	0	0	4.70	4
J. Silva	11	36 1/3	2	1	5.94	30
J. Johnson	3	6	0	0	6.00	3
M. Ruebel	44	62 2/3	3	2	6.32	50
D. Wainhouse	25	28	0	1	8.04	21
J. Granger	9	5	0	0	18.00	4
Team totals	162	1,436	79	83	4.28	1,080

== Awards and honors ==
The Sporting News Executive of the Year Award

- Cam Bonifay, GM

1997 Major League Baseball All-Star Game

- Tony Womack, 2B, reserve

== Notable transactions ==
- July 8, 1997: Midre Cummings was selected off waivers from the Pirates by the Philadelphia Phillies.

== Farm system ==
Level	Team	League	Manager
AAA	Calgary Cannons	Pacific Coast League	Trent Jewett
AA	Carolina Mudcats	Southern League	Marc Hill and Jeff Banister
A	Lynchburg Hillcats	Carolina League	Jeff Banister and Jeff Richardson
A	Augusta Greenjackets	South Atlantic League	Jeff Richardson and Scott Little
A-Short Season	Erie SeaWolves	New York–Penn League	Marty Brown
Rookie	GCL Pirates	Gulf Coast League	Woody Huyke

LEAGUE CHAMPIONS: Lynchburg
