= 1997 San Diego Padres season =

1997 San Diego Padres
- League: National League
- Division: West
- Ballpark: Qualcomm Stadium
- City: San Diego, California
- Record: 76–86 (.469)
- Divisional place: 4th
- Owners: John Moores
- General managers: Kevin Towers
- Managers: Bruce Bochy
- Television: KUSI-TV; 4SD (Mark Grant, Mel Proctor, Rick Sutcliffe, Glenn Geffner)
- Radio: KFMB (AM) (Jerry Coleman, Ted Leitner, Bob Chandler, Glenn Geffner)

The 1997 San Diego Padres season was the 29th season in franchise history. The Padres finished last in the National League West. Right fielder (and future Hall of Famer) Tony Gwynn had the highest batting average in the majors, at .372.

In April, the Padres played three home games at the Aloha Stadium in Hawaii against the St. Louis Cardinals. The Cardinals won the opening two games (a doubleheader) on April 19, winning the first 1-0 and the second 2-1 before the Padres won game 3 on Sunday April 20 by a score of 8–2. Reported attendances were 37,382 (games 1 and 2) and 40,050 (game 3).

== Regular season ==
=== Transactions ===
- June 13, 1997: Fernando Valenzuela was traded by the San Diego Padres with Scott Livingstone and Phil Plantier to the St. Louis Cardinals for Rich Batchelor, Danny Jackson, and Mark Sweeney.
- August 13, 1997: Rickey Henderson was traded by the San Diego Padres to the Anaheim Angels for a player to be named later, Ryan Hancock, and Stevenson Agosto (minors). The Anaheim Angels sent George Arias (August 19, 1997) to the San Diego Padres to complete the trade.

=== Season standings ===
NL West
Team	W	L	Pct.	GB	Home	Road
San Francisco Giants	90	72	.556	—	48‍–‍33	42‍–‍39
Los Angeles Dodgers	88	74	.543	2	47‍–‍34	41‍–‍40
Colorado Rockies	83	79	.512	7	47‍–‍34	36‍–‍45
San Diego Padres	76	86	.469	14	39‍–‍42	37‍–‍44

=== Record vs. opponents ===
1997 National League record Source: MLB Standings Grid – 1997
Team	ATL	CHC	CIN	COL	FLA	HOU	LAD	MON	NYM	PHI	PIT	SD	SF	STL	AL
Atlanta	—	9–2	9–2	5–6	4–8	7–4	6–5	10–2	5–7	10–2	5–6	8–3	7–4	8–3	8–7
Chicago	2–9	—	7–5	2–9	2–9	3–9	5–6	4–7	6–5	6–5	7–5	6–5	5–6	4–8	9–6
Cincinnati	2–9	5–7	—	5–6	5–6	5–7	6–5	6–5	2–9	8–3	8–4	5–6	4–7	6–6	9–6
Colorado	6–5	9–2	6–5	—	7–4	5–6	5–7	7–4	6–5	4–7	4–7	4–8	4–8	7–4	9–7
Florida	8–4	9–2	6–5	4–7	—	7–4	7–4	7–5	4–8	6–6	7–4	5–6	5–6	5–6	12–3
Houston	4–7	9–3	7–5	6–5	4–7	—	7–4	8–3	7–4	4–7	6–6	6–5	3–8	9–3	4–11
Los Angeles	5–6	6–5	5–6	7–5	4–7	4–7	—	7–4	6–5	10–1	9–2	5–7	6–6	5–6	9–7
Montreal	2–10	7–4	5–6	4–7	5–7	3–8	4–7	—	5–7	6–6	5–6	8–3	6–5	6–5	12–3
New York	7–5	5–6	9–2	5–6	8–4	4–7	5–6	7–5	—	7–5	7–4	5–6	3–8	9–2	7–8
Philadelphia	2–10	5–6	3–8	7–4	6–6	7–4	1–10	6–6	5–7	—	5–6	7–4	3–8	6–5	5–10
Pittsburgh	6–5	5–7	4–8	7–4	4–7	6–6	2–9	6–5	4–7	6–5	—	5–6	8–3	9–3	7–8
San Diego	3–8	5–6	6–5	8–4	6–5	5–6	7–5	3–8	6–5	4–7	6–5	—	4–8	5–6	8–8
San Francisco	4–7	6–5	7–4	8–4	6–5	8–3	6–6	5–6	8–3	8–3	3–8	8–4	—	3–8	10–6
St. Louis	3–8	8–4	6–6	4–7	6–5	3–9	6–5	5–6	2–9	5–6	3–9	6–5	8–3	—	8–7

=== Roster ===
1997 San Diego Padres
Roster
Pitchers: 43 Andy Ashby; 46 Rich Batchelor; 40,44 Sean Bergman; 45 Doug Bochtler; 55 Jim Bruske; 33 Terry Burrows; 39 Will Cunnane; 44 Todd Erdos; 50 Joey Hamilton; 41 Sterling Hitchcock; 51 Trevor Hoffman; 34 Danny Jackson; 32 Marc Kroon; 52 Joey Long; 54 Paul Menhart; 48 Heath Murray; 54 Tim Scott; 47 Pete Smith; 34 Fernando Valenzuela; 53 Darío Veras; 36 Tim Worrell	Catchers: 23 John Flaherty; 9,65 Carlos Hernández; 3 Mandy Romero; 14 Don Slaught; Infielders: 14 George Arias; 21 Ken Caminiti; 29 Archi Cianfrocco; 10 Chris Gomez; 22 Wally Joyner; 27 Derrek Lee; 8 Scott Livingstone; 18 Craig Shipley; 26 Terry Shumpert; 13 Jorge Velandia; 4 Quilvio Veras	Outfielders: 31 Trey Beamon; 12 Steve Finley; 19 Tony Gwynn; 24 Rickey Henderson; 20 Chris Jones; 7 Phil Plantier; 28 Rubén Rivera; 8 Mark Sweeney; 25 Greg Vaughn	Manager: 15 Bruce Bochy; Coaches: 38 Greg Booker (bullpen); 11 Tim Flannery (third base); 42 Davey Lopes (first base); 5 Rob Picciolo (bench); 16 Merv Rettenmund (hitting); 37 Dan Warthen (pitching)

== Player stats ==
=== Batting ===
==== Starters by position ====
Note: Pos = Position; G = Games played; AB = At bats; H = Hits; Avg. = Batting average; HR = Home runs; RBI = Runs batted in

Pos	Player	G	AB	H	Avg.	HR	RBI
C	John Flaherty	129	439	120	.273	9	46
1B	Wally Joyner	135	455	149	.327	13	83
2B	Quilvio Veras	145	539	143	.265	3	45
SS	Chris Gomez	150	522	132	.253	5	54
3B	Ken Caminiti	137	486	141	.290	26	90
LF	Greg Vaughn	120	361	78	.216	18	57
CF	Steve Finley	143	560	146	.261	28	92
RF	Tony Gwynn	149	592	220	.372	17	119

==== Other batters ====
Note: G = Games played; AB = At bats; H = Hits; Avg. = Batting average; HR = Home runs; RBI = Runs batted in

Player	G	AB	H	Avg.	HR	RBI
Rickey Henderson	88	288	79	.274	6	27
Archi Cianfrocco	89	220	54	.245	4	26
Chris Jones	92	152	37	.243	7	25
Craig Shipley	63	139	38	.273	5	19
Carlos Hernández	50	134	42	.313	3	14
Mark Sweeney	71	103	33	.320	2	19
Trey Beamon	43	65	18	.277	0	7
Derrek Lee	22	54	14	.259	1	4
Mandy Romero	21	48	10	.208	2	4
Terry Shumpert	13	33	9	.273	1	6
Jorge Velandia	14	29	3	.103	0	0
Scott Livingstone	23	26	4	.154	0	3
George Arias	11	22	5	.227	0	2
Don Slaught	20	20	0	.000	0	0
Rubén Rivera	17	20	5	.250	0	1
Phil Plantier	10	8	1	.125	0	0

=== Pitching ===
==== Starting pitchers ====
Note: G = Games pitched; IP = Innings pitched; W = Wins; L = Losses; ERA = Earned run average; SO = Strikeouts

Player	G	IP	W	L	ERA	SO
Andy Ashby	30	200.2	9	11	4.13	144
Joey Hamilton	31	192.2	12	7	4.25	124
Sterling Hitchcock	32	161.0	10	11	5.20	106
Fernando Valenzuela	13	66.1	2	8	4.75	51
Paul Menhart	9	44.0	2	3	4.70	22

==== Other pitchers ====
Note: G = Games pitched; IP = Innings pitched; W = Wins; L = Losses; ERA = Earned run average; SO = Strikeouts

Player	G	IP	W	L	ERA	SO
Pete Smith	37	118.0	7	6	4.81	68
Tim Worrell	60	106.1	4	8	5.16	81
Sean Bergman	44	99.0	2	4	6.09	74
Will Cunnane	54	91.1	6	3	5.81	79
Danny Jackson	13	49.0	1	7	7.53	19
Heath Murray	17	33.1	1	2	6.75	16

===== Relief pitchers =====
Note: G = Games pitched; W = Wins; L = Losses; SV = Saves; ERA = Earned run average; SO = Strikeouts

Player	G	W	L	SV	ERA	SO
Trevor Hoffman	70	6	4	37	2.66	111
Doug Bochtler	54	3	6	2	4.77	46
Jim Bruske	28	4	1	0	3.63	32
Dario Veras	23	2	1	0	5.11	21
Tim Scott	14	1	1	0	7.85	14
Rich Batchelor	13	2	0	0	7.82	10
Terry Burrows	13	0	2	0	10.45	8
Marc Kroon	12	0	1	0	6.35	12
Todd Erdos	11	2	0	0	5.27	13
Joey Long	10	0	0	0	8.18	8

== League Honors ==
=== All-Stars ===
- Ken Caminiti, starting 3B
- Steve Finley
- Tony Gwynn, starting DH

=== Awards ===
- Gold Glove: Ken Caminiti (3B)
- Silver Slugger Award: Tony Gwynn (OF)

=== Statistical leaders ===
- Tony Gwynn: Batting Champion (.372)

== Farm system ==
Level	Team	League	Manager
AAA	Las Vegas Stars	Pacific Coast League	Jerry Royster
AA	Mobile BayBears	Southern League	Mike Ramsey
A	Rancho Cucamonga Quakes	California League	Mike Basso
A	Clinton LumberKings	Midwest League	Tom LeVasseur
Rookie	AZL Padres	Arizona League	Randy Whisler
Rookie	Idaho Falls Braves	Pioneer League	Don Werner
