= 1997 Montreal Expos season =

1997 Montreal Expos
- League: National League
- Division: East
- Ballpark: Olympic Stadium
- City: Montreal
- Record: 78–84
- Divisional place: 4th
- Owners: Claude Brochu
- General managers: Jim Beattie
- Managers: Felipe Alou
- Television: The Sports Network (Dave Van Horne, Ken Singleton); TQS (Michel Villeneuve, Marc Griffin); SRC (Claude Raymond, Rene Pothier); RDS Network (Denis Casavant, Rodger Brulotte)
- Radio: CIQC (Dave Van Horne, Joe Cannon, Elliott Price); CKAC (AM) (Jacques Doucet, Rodger Brulotte, Alain Chantelois)

The 1997 Montreal Expos season was the 29th season of the franchise. They finished 78–84, 23 games back of the Atlanta Braves in the National League East and 14 games back of the Florida Marlins in the Wild Card. They played the Toronto Blue Jays in Interleague play for the first time during the season.

== Offseason ==
- October 28, 1996: John Habyan was released by the Montreal Expos.
- November 15, 1996: Dave Silvestri was selected off waivers by the Seattle Mariners from the Montreal Expos.
- December 17, 1996: Torey Lovullo was signed as a free agent with the Montreal Expos.
- January 21, 1997: Lee Smith signed as a free agent with the Montreal Expos.
- January 28, 1997: Yamil Benitez was traded by the Montreal Expos to the Kansas City Royals for Melvin Bunch.
- March 26, 1997: Cliff Floyd was traded by the Montreal Expos to the Florida Marlins for Dustin Hermanson and Joe Orsulak.
- March 31, 1997: Rico Rossy was signed as a free agent with the Montreal Expos.

== Spring training ==
The Expos held spring training at West Palm Beach Municipal Stadium in West Palm Beach, Florida – a facility they shared with the Atlanta Braves – for the last time in 1997. It was their 21st season at the stadium; they had conducted spring training there from 1969 to 1972 and since 1981. In the final spring training game at Municipal Stadium, held on March 26, 1997, the Expos defeated the Braves 2–0. The following season, the Expos moved their spring training activities to Roger Dean Stadium in Jupiter, Florida.

== Regular season ==
In 1997, Pedro Martínez posted a 17–8 record for the Expos, and led the league in half a dozen pitching categories, including a 1.90 ERA, 305 strikeouts and 13 complete games pitched, and won the National League Cy Young Award. Pedro Martínez was also the first right-handed pitcher to reach 300 strikeouts with an ERA under 2.00 since Walter Johnson in 1912.

The 13 complete games were tied for the second-highest single-season total in all of baseball since Martínez's career began (Curt Schilling had 15 in 1998; Chuck Finley and Jack McDowell also reached 13 in a year). However, this 1997 total is by far the highest in Martínez's career, as he has only completed more than 5 games in one other season (7, in 2000).

- May 7, 1997 – The Expos set a team record (never broken) in runs scored in one inning as they score 13 runs off of Julián Tavárez, Jim Poole, and Joe Roa of the San Francisco Giants at 3Com Park. The Expos would go on to defeat the Giants 19 to 3. The only non-pitcher on the Expos to not register a hit was Sherman Obando who went 0 for 1. An up-and-coming prospect named Vladimir Guerrero hit his first career double and was struck by his second career pitch. A crowd of 9,958 were on hand to witness it in San Francisco.

=== Opening-day starters ===
- Shane Andrews
- Jim Bullinger
- Darrin Fletcher
- Mark Grudzielanek
- Mike Lansing
- Joe Orsulak
- Henry Rodríguez
- David Segui
- Rondell White

=== Season standings ===
NL East
Team	W	L	Pct.	GB	Home	Road
Atlanta Braves	101	61	.623	—	50‍–‍31	51‍–‍30
Florida Marlins	92	70	.568	9	52‍–‍29	40‍–‍41
New York Mets	88	74	.543	13	50‍–‍31	38‍–‍43
Montreal Expos	78	84	.481	23	45‍–‍36	33‍–‍48
Philadelphia Phillies	68	94	.420	33	38‍–‍43	30‍–‍51

=== Record vs. opponents ===
1997 National League record Source: MLB Standings Grid – 1997
Team	ATL	CHC	CIN	COL	FLA	HOU	LAD	MON	NYM	PHI	PIT	SD	SF	STL	AL
Atlanta	—	9–2	9–2	5–6	4–8	7–4	6–5	10–2	5–7	10–2	5–6	8–3	7–4	8–3	8–7
Chicago	2–9	—	7–5	2–9	2–9	3–9	5–6	4–7	6–5	6–5	7–5	6–5	5–6	4–8	9–6
Cincinnati	2–9	5–7	—	5–6	5–6	5–7	6–5	6–5	2–9	8–3	8–4	5–6	4–7	6–6	9–6
Colorado	6–5	9–2	6–5	—	7–4	5–6	5–7	7–4	6–5	4–7	4–7	4–8	4–8	7–4	9–7
Florida	8–4	9–2	6–5	4–7	—	7–4	7–4	7–5	4–8	6–6	7–4	5–6	5–6	5–6	12–3
Houston	4–7	9–3	7–5	6–5	4–7	—	7–4	8–3	7–4	4–7	6–6	6–5	3–8	9–3	4–11
Los Angeles	5–6	6–5	5–6	7–5	4–7	4–7	—	7–4	6–5	10–1	9–2	5–7	6–6	5–6	9–7
Montreal	2–10	7–4	5–6	4–7	5–7	3–8	4–7	—	5–7	6–6	5–6	8–3	6–5	6–5	12–3
New York	7–5	5–6	9–2	5–6	8–4	4–7	5–6	7–5	—	7–5	7–4	5–6	3–8	9–2	7–8
Philadelphia	2–10	5–6	3–8	7–4	6–6	7–4	1–10	6–6	5–7	—	5–6	7–4	3–8	6–5	5–10
Pittsburgh	6–5	5–7	4–8	7–4	4–7	6–6	2–9	6–5	4–7	6–5	—	5–6	8–3	9–3	7–8
San Diego	3–8	5–6	6–5	8–4	6–5	5–6	7–5	3–8	6–5	4–7	6–5	—	4–8	5–6	8–8
San Francisco	4–7	6–5	7–4	8–4	6–5	8–3	6–6	5–6	8–3	8–3	3–8	8–4	—	3–8	10–6
St. Louis	3–8	8–4	6–6	4–7	6–5	3–9	6–5	5–6	2–9	5–6	3–9	6–5	8–3	—	8–7

Expos vs. American League
Team	AL East				
Team	BAL	BOS	DET	NYY	TOR
Montreal	2–1	3–0	3–0	2–1	2–1

=== Notable transactions ===
- May 20, 1997: Torey Lovullo was released by the Montreal Expos.
- July 25, 1997: Omar Daal was selected off waivers by the Toronto Blue Jays from the Montreal Expos.
- July 31, 1997: Jeff Juden was traded by the Montreal Expos to the Cleveland Indians for Steve Kline.
- September 25, 1997: Lee Smith was released by the Montreal Expos.

=== Roster ===
1997 Montreal Expos
Roster
Pitchers: 54 Shayne Bennett; 52 Jim Bullinger; 13 Rhéal Cormier; 47 Omar Daal; 34 Rick DeHart; 53 Steve Falteisek; 30 Dustin Hermanson; 47 Mike Johnson; 14 Jeff Juden; 44 Steve Kline; 45 Pedro Martínez; 36 José Paniagua; 33 Carlos Pérez; 49 Lee Smith; 38 Everett Stull; 32 Anthony Telford; 51 Mike Thurman; 44 Salomón Torres; 41 Ugueth Urbina; 18 Marc Valdes; 43 Dave Veres	Catchers: 12 Raúl Chávez; 24 Darrin Fletcher; 16 Chris Widger; Infielders: 11 Shane Andrews; 2 Orlando Cabrera; 14 Brad Fullmer; 4 Mark Grudzielanek; 3 Mike Lansing; 21 David Segui; 5 Andy Stankiewicz; 15 Doug Strange; 37 José Vidro	Outfielders: 27 Vladimir Guerrero; 9 Ryan McGuire; 31 Hensley Meulens; 29 Sherman Obando; 19 Joe Orsulak; 40 Henry Rodríguez; 7 F. P. Santangelo; 22 Rondell White	Manager: 17 Felipe Alou; Coaches: 67 Pierre Arsenault (Bullpen); 26 Bobby Cuellar (Pitching); 1 Tommy Harper (Hitting); 25 Pete Mackanin (Third base); 55 Luis Pujols (First base); 23 Jim Tracy (Bench)

=== Interleague play ===
- June 30 – The first interleague game between the Montreal Expos and the Toronto Blue Jays took place at SkyDome. The Expos won the game by a score of 2–1.

==== Expos vs. Jays ====
June 30, SkyDome, Toronto, Ontario

Team	1	2	3	4	5	6	7	8	9	R	H	E
Montreal	0	1	0	0	0	1	0	0	0	2	6	0
Toronto	0	0	0	0	0	0	1	0	0	1	3	0
W: Pedro Martínez (10–3) L: Pat Hentgen (8–5)
Home Runs: Vladimir Guerrero (4), Carlos Delgado (15) Attendance: 37,430 Time: 2:03

==== Batting ====
Montreal Expos	AB	R	H	RBI	Toronto Blue Jays	AB	R	H	RBI
Grudzielanek, ss	3	1	1	0	Nixon cf	4	0	1	0
Lansing 2b	4	0	0	0	Merced dh	4	0	0	0
Santangelo 3b	4	0	0	0	Carter lf	4	0	0	0
Segui 1b	3	0	2	1	Delgado 1b	2	1	1	1
Rodriguez lf	4	0	0	0	Sprague 3b	3	0	0	0
Orsulak lf	0	0	0	0	Green rf	3	0	0	0
Guerrero rf	4	1	2	1	Santiago c	3	0	0	0
McGuire dh	3	0	0	0	Gonzalez ss	3	0	1	0
White cf	3	0	0	0	Garcia 2b	3	0	0	0
Widger c	3	0	1	0	NONE	0	0	0	0
Totals	31	2	6	2	Totals	29	1	3	1

==== Pitching ====
Montreal Expos	IP	H	R	ER	BB	SO
Martinez W (10–3)	9.0	3	1	1	1	10
Totals	9.0	3	1	1	1	10

Toronto Blue Jays	IP	H	R	ER	BB	SO
Hentgen L (8–5)	9.0	6	2	2	1	3
Totals	9.0	6	2	2	1	3

== Player stats ==
= Indicates team leader

=== Batting ===
==== Starters by position ====
Note: Pos = Position; G = Games played; AB = At bats; H = Hits; Avg. = Batting average; HR = Home runs; RBI = Runs batted in

Pos	Player	G	AB	H	Avg.	HR	RBI
C	Chris Widger	91	278	65	.234	7	37
1B	David Segui	125	459	141	.307	21	68
2B	Mike Lansing	144	572	161	.281	20	70
SS	Mark Grudzielanek	156	649	177	.273	4	51
3B	Doug Strange	118	327	84	.257	12	47
LF	Henry Rodriguez	132	476	116	.244	26	83
CF	Rondell White	151	592	160	.270	28	82
RF	Vladimir Guerrero	90	325	98	.302	11	40

==== Other batters ====
Note: G = Games played; AB = At bats; H = Hits; Avg. = Batting average; HR = Home runs; RBI = Runs batted in

Player	G	AB	H	Avg.	HR	RBI
F.P. Santangelo	130	350	87	.249	5	31
Darrin Fletcher	96	310	86	.277	17	55
Ryan McGuire	84	199	51	.256	3	17
José Vidro	67	169	42	.249	2	17
Joe Orsulak	106	150	34	.227	1	7
Andy Stankiewicz	76	107	24	.224	1	5
Shane Andrews	18	64	13	.203	4	9
Sherman Obando	41	47	6	.128	2	9
Brad Fullmer	19	40	12	.300	3	8
Raúl Chávez	13	26	7	.269	0	2
Hensley Meulens	16	24	7	.292	2	6
Orlando Cabrera	16	18	4	.222	0	2

=== Pitching ===
= Indicates league leader

==== Starting pitchers ====
Note: G = Games pitched; IP = Innings pitched; W = Wins; L = Losses; ERA = Earned run average; SO = Strikeouts

Player	G	IP	W	L	ERA	SO
Pedro Martínez	31	241.1	17	8	1.90	305
Carlos Pérez	33	206.2	12	13	3.88	110
Dustin Hermanson	32	158.1	8	8	3.69	136
Jeff Juden	22	130.0	11	5	4.22	107
Mike Johnson	11	50.0	2	5	5.94	28
Rhéal Cormier	1	1.1	0	1	33.75	0

==== Other pitchers ====
Note: G = Games pitched; IP = Innings pitched; W = Wins; L = Losses; ERA = Earned run average; SO = Strikeouts

Player	G	IP	W	L	ERA	SO
Jim Bullinger	36	155.1	7	12	5.56	87
Marc Valdes	48	95.0	4	4	3.13	54
José Paniagua	9	18.0	1	2	12.00	8
Mike Thurman	5	11.2	1	0	5.40	8

==== Relief pitchers ====
Note: G = Games pitched; W = Wins; L = Losses; SV = Saves; ERA = Earned run average; SO = Strikeouts

Player	G	W	L	SV	ERA	SO
Ugueth Urbina	63	5	8	27	3.78	84
Anthony Telford	65	4	6	1	3.24	61
Dave Veres	53	2	3	1	3.48	47
Omar Daal	33	1	2	1	9.79	16
Steve Kline	26	1	3	0	6.15	20
Lee Smith	25	0	1	5	5.82	15
Rick DeHart	23	2	1	0	5.52	29
Shayne Bennett	16	0	1	0	3.18	8
Salomón Torres	12	0	0	0	7.25	11
Steve Falteisek	5	0	0	0	3.38	2
Everett Stull	3	0	1	0	16.20	2

== Award winners ==
- Pedro Martínez, NL Cy Young Award
- Pedro Martínez, Pitcher of the Month, August

1997 Major League Baseball All-Star Game

- Pedro Martínez, pitcher, reserve

== Farm system ==
Level	Team	League	Manager
AAA	Ottawa Lynx	International League	Pat Kelly
AA	Harrisburg Senators	Eastern League	Rick Sofield
A	West Palm Beach Expos	Florida State League	Doug Sisson
A	Cape Fear Crocs	South Atlantic League	Phil Stephenson
A-Short Season	Vermont Expos	New York–Penn League	Kevin Higgins
Rookie	GCL Expos	Gulf Coast League	Luis Dorante

LEAGUE CHAMPIONS: Harrisburg
