= 1997 Cincinnati Reds season =

1997 Cincinnati Reds
- League: National League
- Division: Central
- Ballpark: Cinergy Field
- City: Cincinnati
- Record: 76–86 (.469)
- Divisional place: 3rd
- Owners: Marge Schott
- General managers: Jim Bowden
- Managers: Ray Knight, Jack McKeon
- Television: WSTR/WKRC-TV; SportsChannel Cincinnati (Marty Brennaman, George Grande, Chris Welsh)
- Radio: WLW (Marty Brennaman, Joe Nuxhall)

The 1997 Cincinnati Reds season was the 128th season for the franchise in Major League Baseball, and their 28th and 27th full season at Cinergy Field The Reds failed to improve on their record of 81–81 from 1996 and finished the season at 76-86, missing the postseason for the 2nd consecutive season. The Reds were managed by Ray Knight and then Jack McKeon.

== Offseason ==
- December 13, 1996: Pete Rose Jr. was signed as a free agent with the Cincinnati Reds.
- December 21, 1996: Stan Belinda was signed as a free agent with the Cincinnati Reds.
- December 23, 1996: Rikkert Faneyte was sent to the Cincinnati Reds by the Texas Rangers as part of a conditional deal.
- January 27, 1997: Terry Pendleton was signed as a free agent with the Cincinnati Reds.
- February 8, 1997: Joe Oliver was signed as a free agent with the Cincinnati Reds.
- March 27, 1997: Scott Service was selected off waivers by the Oakland Athletics from the Cincinnati Reds.

== Regular season ==
=== Season standings ===
NL Central
Team	W	L	Pct.	GB	Home	Road
Houston Astros	84	78	.519	—	46‍–‍35	38‍–‍43
Pittsburgh Pirates	79	83	.488	5	43‍–‍38	36‍–‍45
Cincinnati Reds	76	86	.469	8	40‍–‍41	36‍–‍45
St. Louis Cardinals	73	89	.451	11	41‍–‍40	32‍–‍49
Chicago Cubs	68	94	.420	16	42‍–‍39	26‍–‍55

=== Record vs. opponents ===
1997 National League record Source: MLB Standings Grid – 1997
Team	ATL	CHC	CIN	COL	FLA	HOU	LAD	MON	NYM	PHI	PIT	SD	SF	STL	AL
Atlanta	—	9–2	9–2	5–6	4–8	7–4	6–5	10–2	5–7	10–2	5–6	8–3	7–4	8–3	8–7
Chicago	2–9	—	7–5	2–9	2–9	3–9	5–6	4–7	6–5	6–5	7–5	6–5	5–6	4–8	9–6
Cincinnati	2–9	5–7	—	5–6	5–6	5–7	6–5	6–5	2–9	8–3	8–4	5–6	4–7	6–6	9–6
Colorado	6–5	9–2	6–5	—	7–4	5–6	5–7	7–4	6–5	4–7	4–7	4–8	4–8	7–4	9–7
Florida	8–4	9–2	6–5	4–7	—	7–4	7–4	7–5	4–8	6–6	7–4	5–6	5–6	5–6	12–3
Houston	4–7	9–3	7–5	6–5	4–7	—	7–4	8–3	7–4	4–7	6–6	6–5	3–8	9–3	4–11
Los Angeles	5–6	6–5	5–6	7–5	4–7	4–7	—	7–4	6–5	10–1	9–2	5–7	6–6	5–6	9–7
Montreal	2–10	7–4	5–6	4–7	5–7	3–8	4–7	—	5–7	6–6	5–6	8–3	6–5	6–5	12–3
New York	7–5	5–6	9–2	5–6	8–4	4–7	5–6	7–5	—	7–5	7–4	5–6	3–8	9–2	7–8
Philadelphia	2–10	5–6	3–8	7–4	6–6	7–4	1–10	6–6	5–7	—	5–6	7–4	3–8	6–5	5–10
Pittsburgh	6–5	5–7	4–8	7–4	4–7	6–6	2–9	6–5	4–7	6–5	—	5–6	8–3	9–3	7–8
San Diego	3–8	5–6	6–5	8–4	6–5	5–6	7–5	3–8	6–5	4–7	6–5	—	4–8	5–6	8–8
San Francisco	4–7	6–5	7–4	8–4	6–5	8–3	6–6	5–6	8–3	8–3	3–8	8–4	—	3–8	10–6
St. Louis	3–8	8–4	6–6	4–7	6–5	3–9	6–5	5–6	2–9	5–6	3–9	6–5	8–3	—	8–7

=== Notable transactions ===
- April 4, 1997: Scott Service was selected off waivers by the Cincinnati Reds from the Oakland Athletics.
- June 3, 1997: DeWayne Wise was drafted by the Cincinnati Reds in the 5th round of the 1997 amateur draft. Player signed June 5, 1997.
- July 15, 1997: Chris Stynes was traded by the Kansas City Royals with Jon Nunnally to the Cincinnati Reds for Hector Carrasco and Scott Service.
- July 24, 1997: Terry Pendleton was released by the Cincinnati Reds.
- July 31, 1997: John Smiley was traded by the Cincinnati Reds with Jeff Branson to the Cleveland Indians for Jim Crowell, Danny Graves, Damian Jackson, and Scott Winchester.

=== Roster ===
1997 Cincinnati Reds
Roster
Pitchers: 37 Stan Belinda; 40 Ricky Bones; 45 Jeff Brantley; 34 Dave Burba; 61 Giovanni Carrara; 58 Héctor Carrasco; 50 Jim Crowell; 49 Joey Eischen; 32 Danny Graves; 32 Kevin Jarvis; 58 Richie Lewis; 53 Pedro Martínez; 38 Kent Mercker; 31,36 Mike Morgan; 43 Mike Remlinger; 67 Félix Rodríguez; 46 Pete Schourek; 50 Scott Service; 41 Jeff Shaw; 57 John Smiley; 56 Scott Sullivan; 51 Jeff Tabaka; 40 Brett Tomko; 48 Gabe White; 52 Scott Winchester	Catchers: 6 Brook Fordyce; 7 Joe Oliver; 10 Eddie Taubensee; Infielders: 17 Aaron Boone; 29 Bret Boone; 20 Jeff Branson; 12 Willie Greene; 4 Damian Jackson; 11 Barry Larkin; 23 Hal Morris; 9 Terry Pendleton; 39 Eduardo Pérez; 3 Pokey Reese; 14 Pete Rose Jr.	Outfielders: 00 Curtis Goodwin; 28 Lenny Harris; 15 Mike Kelly; 22 Jon Nunnally; 18 Eric Owens; 21 Deion Sanders; 16 Reggie Sanders; 22 Rubén Sierra; 20 Chris Stynes; 31 Ozzie Timmons; 44 Pat Watkins	Manager: 25 Ray Knight; 31 Jack McKeon; Coaches: 30 Ken Griffey, Sr. (hitting); 35 Don Gullett (pitching); 47 Tom Hume (bullpen); 19 Denis Menke (bench); 0 Ron Oester (first base); 2 Joel Youngblood (third base)

=== Game log ===
1997 Game Log
April

#	Date	Opponent	Score	Win	Loss	Save	Attendance	Record
1	April 1	Colorado Rockies	11 – 4				54,820	1-0
2	April 2	Colorado Rockies	5 – 3				20,210	2-0
3	April 3	Colorado Rockies	7 – 1				22,660	2-1
4	April 4	Florida Marlins	9 – 7				25,039	3-1
5	April 5	Florida Marlins	4 – 3				38,598	3-2
6	April 6	Florida Marlins	3 – 2				36,146	3-3
7	April 7	Colorado Rockies	13 – 2				48,014	3-4
8	April 9	Colorado Rockies	13 – 4				50,095	3-5
9	April 11	Florida Marlins	10 – 0				21,240	3-6
10	April 12	Florida Marlins	2 – 1				21,466	4-6
11	April 13	Florida Marlins	6 – 4				17,687	5-6
12	April 14	Atlanta Braves	15 – 5				31,427	5-7
13	April 15	Atlanta Braves	3 – 0				31,962	5-8
14	April 16	Atlanta Braves	7 – 1				38,411	5-9
15	April 17	Pittsburgh Pirates	3 – 2				6,039	5-10
16	April 18	Pittsburgh Pirates	6 – 1				9,082	6-10
17	April 19	Pittsburgh Pirates	6 – 5				11,457	6-11
18	April 20	Pittsburgh Pirates	5 – 3				14,542	6-12
19	April 22	New York Mets	7 – 2				14,585	6-13
20	April 23	New York Mets	10 – 2				26,492	6-14
21	April 25	Philadelphia Phillies	10 – 7				22,843	6-15
22	April 26	Philadelphia Phillies	10 – 2				27,357	7-15
23	April 28	New York Mets	15 – 2				15,572	7-16
24	April 29	New York Mets	3 – 1				17,699	7-17
25	April 30	Atlanta Braves	12 – 3				18,278	7-18

May

#	Date	Opponent	Score	Win	Loss	Save	Attendance	Record
26	1 May	Atlanta Braves	4 – 2				19,991	7-19
27	2 May	San Francisco Giants	6 – 2				11,959	8-19
28	3 May	San Francisco Giants	3 – 1				18,149	9-19
29	4 May	San Francisco Giants	2 – 1				26,287	9-20
30	5 May	Los Angeles Dodgers	3 – 1				26,955	9-21
31	6 May	Los Angeles Dodgers	3 – 2				38,241	10-21
32	7 May	Los Angeles Dodgers	4 – 2				28,303	10-22
33	9 May	San Diego Padres	7 – 2				22,695	11-22
34	10 May	San Diego Padres	9 – 6				24,739	11-23
35	11 May	San Diego Padres	5 – 4				31,539	11-24
36	13 May	San Francisco Giants	4 – 1				17,828	11-25
37	14 May	San Francisco Giants	4 – 2				16,404	11-26
38	15 May	Los Angeles Dodgers	2 – 1				16,986	11-27
39	16 May	Los Angeles Dodgers	4 – 2				24,556	12-27
40	17 May	San Diego Padres	6 – 2				21,469	12-28
41	18 May	San Diego Padres	5 – 0				23,265	13-28
42	19 May	San Diego Padres	13 – 6				17,898	13-29
43	20 May	Houston Astros	7 – 4				14,954	14-29
44	21 May	Houston Astros	4 – 3				15,088	14-30
45	23 May	Chicago Cubs	3 – 1				23,189	14-31
46	24 May	Chicago Cubs	4 – 1				26,887	15-31
47	25 May	Chicago Cubs	7 – 5				26,844	16-31
48	26 May	Philadelphia Phillies	8 – 5				0	17-31
49	26 May	Philadelphia Phillies	8 – 4				16,798	18-31
50	27 May	Philadelphia Phillies	2 – 1				17,297	18-32
51	28 May	Philadelphia Phillies	2 – 0				15,451	19-32
52	29 May	Chicago Cubs	2 – 1				23,005	19-33
53	30 May	Chicago Cubs	5 – 1				21,267	20-33
54	31 May	Chicago Cubs	7 – 4				36,440	20-34

June

#	Date	Opponent	Score	Win	Loss	Save	Attendance	Record
55	June 1	Chicago Cubs	7 – 1				28849	20-35
56	June 3	Philadelphia Phillies	3 – 2				14340	21-35
57	June 4	Houston Astros	2 – 5				18849	21-36
58	June 5	Houston Astros	6 – 5				22437	22-36
59	June 6	New York Mets	5 – 2				21339	23-36
60	June 7	New York Mets	10 – 5				23830	24-36
61	June 9	New York Mets	4 – 2				23079	24-37
62	June 10	Pittsburgh Pirates	8 – 5				18556	25-37
63	June 11	Pittsburgh Pirates	2 – 1				20854	26-37
64	June 13	Chicago White Sox	3 – 1				31682	26-38
65	June 14	Chicago White Sox	5 – 1				36685	27-38
66	June 15	Chicago White Sox	14 – 6				31663	27-39
67	June 16	Cleveland Indians	4 – 1				42961	28-39
68	June 17	Cleveland Indians	5 – 1				42901	28-40
69	June 18	Cleveland Indians	5 – 2				42865	29-40
70	June 20	St. Louis Cardinals	4 – 2				42091	30-40
71	June 21	St. Louis Cardinals	6 – 2				44931	30-41
72	June 22	St. Louis Cardinals	5 – 2				43194	30-42
73	June 23	Montreal Expos	5 – 0				12367	30-43
74	June 24	Montreal Expos	7 – 6				13141	31-43
75	June 25	Montreal Expos	2 – 1				12407	32-43
76	June 26	St. Louis Cardinals	5 – 3				20116	32-44
77	June 27	St. Louis Cardinals	5 = 3				28317	33-44
78	June 28	St. Louis Cardinals	12 – 6				24390	33-45
79	June 29	St. Louis Cardinals	6 – 5				24216	33-46
80	June 30	Milwaukee Brewers	4 – 3				19866	34-46

July

#	Date	Opponent	Score	Win	Loss	Save	Attendance	Record
81	July 1	Milwaukee Brewers	9:1				21264	35-46
82	July 2	Milwaukee Brewers	7:4				27866	36-46
83	July 3	Houston Astros	4:3				14708	37-46
84	July 4	Houston Astros	4:2				34080	38-46
85	July 5	Houston Astros	1:2				24022	38-47
86	July 6	Houston Astros	5:6				25564	38-48
87	July 11	Montreal Expos	2:5				25915	38-49
88	July 12	Montreal Expos	4:3				25744	39-49
89	July 13	Montreal Expos	0:2				22293	39-50
90	July 14	St. Louis Cardinals	4:2				19405	40-50
91	July 15	St. Louis Cardinals	4:7				21232	40-51
92	July 16	Pittsburgh Pirates	7:3				30698	41-51
93	July 17	Pittsburgh Pirates	9:5				19710	42-51
94	July 18	New York Mets	3:4				22901	42-52
95	July 19	New York Mets	3:5				26675	42-53
96	July 20	New York Mets	1:10				36259	42-54
97	July 21	New York Mets	3:5				22172	42-55
98	July 22	Florida Marlins	7:6				19547	43-55
99	July 23	Florida Marlins	1:8				20371	43-56
100	July 25	Atlanta Braves	3:7				34931	43-57
101	July 26	Atlanta Braves	7:6				33115	44-57
102	July 27	Atlanta Braves	2:3				30167	44-58
103	July 28	Florida Marlins	4:0				18393	45-58
104	July 29	Florida Marlins	1:7				20745	45-59
105	July 30	Florida Marlins	0:6				21373	45-60

August

#	Date	Opponent	Score	Win	Loss	Save	Attendance	Record
106	August 1	San Francisco Giants	7:8				25636	45-61
107	August 2	San Francisco Giants	5:1				23266	46-61
108	August 3	San Francisco Giants	3:8				21272	46-62
109	August 4	San Francisco Giants	1:9				17930	46-63
110	August 5	San Diego Padres	7:3				17797	47-63
111	August 6	San Diego Padres	3:6				18218	47-64
112	August 7	San Diego Padres	7:0				17458	48-64
113	August 8	Los Angeles Dodgers	5:10				26837	48-65
114	August 9	Los Angeles Dodgers	3:2				30809	49-65
115	August 10	Los Angeles Dodgers	8:1				24742	50-65
116	August 11	San Francisco Giants	7:4				19086	51-65
117	August 12	San Francisco Giants	3:7				15890	51-66
118	August 13	San Diego Padres	2:0				15218	52-66
119	August 14	San Diego Padres	4:5				16774	52-67
120	August 15	Los Angeles Dodgers	5:3				46711	53-67
121	August 16	Los Angeles Dodgers	3:5				53464	53-68
122	August 17	Los Angeles Dodgers	5:0				51245	54-68
123	August 19	Colorado Rockies	6:5				31722	55-68
124	August 20	Colorado Rockies	3:5				21968	55-69
125	August 22	Atlanta Braves	2:6				48937	55-70
126	August 23	Atlanta Braves	3:10				48499	55-71
127	August 24	Atlanta Braves	6:4				45577	56-71
128	August 25	Colorado Rockies	7:6				48143	57-71
129	August 25	Colorado Rockies	6:4				48081	58-71
130	August 26	Colorado Rockies	5:9				48063	58-72
131	August 27	Colorado Rockies	5:7				48032	58-73
132	August 29	Minnesota Twins	5:3				12155	59-73
133	August 30	Minnesota Twins	1:4				17831	59-74
134	August 31	Minnesota Twins	6:8				13092	59-75

September

#	Date	Opponent	Score	Win	Loss	Save	Attendance	Record
135	September 1	Kansas City Royals	7 – 4				31,920	59-76
136	September 2	Kansas City Royals	4:0				15,288	60-76
137	September 3	Kansas City Royals	6:3				16,285	61-76
138	September 4	Pittsburgh Pirates	5:2				15,136	62-76
139	September 5	Pittsburgh Pirates	8:6				21,492	63-76
140	September 6	Pittsburgh Pirates	4:13				20,383	63-77
141	September 7	Pittsburgh Pirates	6:3				19,682	64-77
142	September 8	Chicago Cubs	1:8				15,337	64-78
143	September 9	Chicago Cubs	5:2				15,349	65-78
144	September 10	Chicago Cubs	1:3				16,200	65-79
145	September 12	Philadelphia Phillies	4:2				0	66-79
146	September 12	Philadelphia Phillies	1:9				17,546	66-80
147	September 13	Philadelphia Phillies	3:0				15,524	67-80
148	September 14	Philadelphia Phillies	6:4				20,518	68-80
149	September 15	Chicago Cubs	4 – 1				20,352	69-80
150	September 16	Chicago Cubs	5 – 0				22,190	69-81
151	September 17	Montreal Expos	4 – 1				15,757	69-82
152	September 18	Montreal Expos	6 – 3				15,099	70-82
153	September 19	Houston Astros	5 – 4				21,791	71-82
154	September 20	Houston Astros	4 – 1				20,197	71-83
155	September 21	Houston Astros	8 – 3				22,652	71-84
156	September 22	Houston Astros	6 – 3				17,411	71-85
157	September 23	St. Louis Cardinals	8 – 6				22,045	72-85
158	September 24	St. Louis Cardinals	5 – 4				23,308	73-85
159	September 25	St. Louis Cardinals	4 – 3				30,938	74-85
160	September 26	Montreal Expos	7 – 1				17,430	75-85
161	September 27	Montreal Expos	8 – 5				14,708	75-86
162	September 28	Montreal Expos	11 – 3				15,477	76-86

== Player stats ==
=== Batting ===
==== Starters by position ====
Note: Pos = Position; G = Games played; AB = At bats; H = Hits; Avg. = Batting average; HR = Home runs; RBI = Runs batted in

Pos	Player	G	AB	H	Avg.	HR	RBI
C	Joe Oliver	111	349	90	.258	14	43
1B	Hal Morris	96	333	92	.276	1	33
2B	Bret Boone	139	443	99	.223	7	46
SS	Pokey Reese	128	397	87	.219	4	26
3B	Willie Greene	151	495	125	.253	26	91
LF	Chris Stynes	49	198	69	.348	6	28
CF	Deion Sanders	115	465	127	.273	5	23
RF	Reggie Sanders	86	312	79	.253	19	56

==== Other batters ====
Note: G = Games played; AB = At bats; H = Hits; Avg. = Batting average; HR = Home runs; RBI = Runs batted in

Player	G	AB	H	Avg.	HR	RBI
Eduardo Pérez	106	297	75	.253	16	52
Curtis Goodwin	85	265	67	.253	1	12
Eddie Taubensee	108	254	68	.268	10	34
Lenny Harris	120	238	65	.273	3	28
Barry Larkin	73	224	71	.317	4	20
Jon Nunnally	65	201	64	.318	13	35
Mike Kelly	73	140	41	.293	6	19
Terry Pendleton	50	113	28	.248	1	17
Jeff Branson	65	98	15	.153	1	5
Brook Fordyce	47	96	20	.208	1	8
Rubén Sierra	25	90	22	.244	2	7
Eric Owens	27	57	15	.263	0	3
Aaron Boone	16	49	12	.245	0	5
Pat Watkins	17	29	6	.207	0	0
Damian Jackson	12	27	6	.222	1	2
Pete Rose Jr.	11	14	2	.143	0	0
Ozzie Timmons	6	9	3	.333	0	0

=== Pitching ===
==== Starting pitchers ====
Note: G = Games pitched; IP = Innings pitched; W = Wins; L = Losses; ERA = Earned run average; SO = Strikeouts

Player	G	IP	W	L	ERA	SO
Mike Morgan	31	162.0	9	12	4.78	103
Dave Burba	30	160.0	11	10	4.73	131
Kent Mercker	28	144.2	8	11	3.92	75
Brett Tomko	22	126.0	11	7	3.43	95
John Smiley	20	117.0	9	10	5.23	94
Pete Schourek	18	84.2	5	8	5.42	59
Giovanni Carrara	2	10.1	0	1	7.84	5

==== Other pitchers ====
Note: G = Games pitched; IP = Innings pitched; W = Wins; L = Losses; ERA = Earned run average; SO = Strikeouts

Player	G	IP	W	L	ERA	SO
Mike Remlinger	69	124.0	8	8	4.14	145
Gabe White	12	41.0	2	2	4.39	25
Ricky Bones	9	17.2	0	1	10.19	8
Jim Crowell	2	6.1	0	1	9.95	3

==== Relief pitchers ====
Note: G = Games pitched; W = Wins; L = Losses; SV = Saves; ERA = Earned run average; SO = Strikeouts

Player	G	W	L	SV	ERA	SO
Jeff Shaw	78	4	2	42	2.38	74
Stan Belinda	84	1	5	1	3.71	114
Scott Sullivan	59	5	3	1	3.24	96
Héctor Carrasco	38	1	2	0	3.68	46
Félix Rodríguez	26	0	0	0	4.30	34
Jeff Brantley	13	1	1	1	3.86	16
Danny Graves	10	0	0	0	6.14	7
Kevin Jarvis	9	0	1	1	10.13	12
Pedro Martínez	8	1	1	0	9.45	4
Scott Winchester	5	0	0	0	6.00	3
Richie Lewis	4	0	0	0	6.35	4
Scott Service	4	0	0	0	11.81	3
Jeff Tabaka	3	0	0	0	4.50	1
Joey Eischen	1	0	0	0	6.75	2

== Awards and records ==
- Bret Boone, National League Record, Best Fielding Average in One Season by a National League Second Baseman (.997)

1997 Major League Baseball All-Star Game

- Barry Larkin, shortstop, starter

== Farm system ==
Level	Team	League	Manager
AAA	Indianapolis Indians	American Association	Dave Miley
AA	Chattanooga Lookouts	Southern League	Mark Berry
A	Burlington Bees	Midwest League	Phillip Wellman
A	Charleston Alley Cats	South Atlantic League	Barry Lyons
Rookie	Billings Mustangs	Pioneer League	Donnie Scott

LEAGUE CHAMPIONS: Billings
