= 1997 San Francisco Giants season =

1997 San Francisco Giants
- National League West champions
- League: National League
- Division: West
- Ballpark: 3Com Park at Candlestick Point
- City: San Francisco
- Record: 90–72 (.556)
- Divisional place: 1st
- Owners: Peter Magowan
- General managers: Brian Sabean
- Managers: Dusty Baker
- Television: KTVU; SportsChannel Pacific (Mike Krukow, Duane Kuiper, Lon Simmons, Ted Robinson, Jon Miller )
- Radio: KNBR (Mike Krukow, Duane Kuiper, Lon Simmons, Ted Robinson, Jon Miller ) SP Radio (Julio Gonzalez, Rene De La Rosa, Amaury Pi-Gonzalez)

The 1997 San Francisco Giants season was the Giants' 115th season in Major League Baseball, their 40th season in San Francisco since their move from New York following the 1957 season, and their 38th at 3Com Park at Candlestick Point. The Giants finished in first place in the National League West with a record of 90 wins and 72 losses. They lost the NLDS in three games to the Florida Marlins.

== Offseason ==
- November 13, 1996: Matt Williams was traded by the San Francisco Giants with a player to be named later to the Cleveland Indians for a player to be named later, Jeff Kent, Julián Tavárez, and José Vizcaíno. The Cleveland Indians sent Joe Roa (December 16, 1996) to the San Francisco Giants to complete the trade.
- November 26, 1996: J. T. Snow was traded by the Anaheim Angels to the San Francisco Giants for Allen Watson and Fausto Macey (minors).
- December 16, 1996: Trenidad Hubbard was sent by the San Francisco Giants to the Cleveland Indians to complete an earlier deal made on November 13, 1996.
- January 6, 1997: Damon Berryhill was signed as a free agent with the San Francisco Giants.

== Regular season ==
- June 12 – The first interleague game took place as the Texas Rangers hosted the San Francisco Giants at The Ballpark in Arlington (now Rangers Ballpark in Arlington).

=== Opening Day starters ===
- Darryl Hamilton CF
- José Vizcaíno SS
- Glenallen Hill RF
- Barry Bonds LF
- Jeff Kent 2B
- J.T. Snow 1B
- Rick Wilkins C
- Bill Mueller 3B
- Mark Gardner P

=== Season standings ===
NL West
| Team | W | L | Pct. | GB | Home | Road |
|---|---|---|---|---|---|---|
| San Francisco Giants | 90 | 72 | .556 | — | 48‍–‍33 | 42‍–‍39 |
| Los Angeles Dodgers | 88 | 74 | .543 | 2 | 47‍–‍34 | 41‍–‍40 |
| Colorado Rockies | 83 | 79 | .512 | 7 | 47‍–‍34 | 36‍–‍45 |
| San Diego Padres | 76 | 86 | .469 | 14 | 39‍–‍42 | 37‍–‍44 |

=== Record vs. opponents ===
1997 National League record Source: MLB Standings Grid – 1997
| Team | ATL | CHC | CIN | COL | FLA | HOU | LAD | MON | NYM | PHI | PIT | SD | SF | STL | AL |
|---|---|---|---|---|---|---|---|---|---|---|---|---|---|---|---|
| Atlanta | — | 9–2 | 9–2 | 5–6 | 4–8 | 7–4 | 6–5 | 10–2 | 5–7 | 10–2 | 5–6 | 8–3 | 7–4 | 8–3 | 8–7 |
| Chicago | 2–9 | — | 7–5 | 2–9 | 2–9 | 3–9 | 5–6 | 4–7 | 6–5 | 6–5 | 7–5 | 6–5 | 5–6 | 4–8 | 9–6 |
| Cincinnati | 2–9 | 5–7 | — | 5–6 | 5–6 | 5–7 | 6–5 | 6–5 | 2–9 | 8–3 | 8–4 | 5–6 | 4–7 | 6–6 | 9–6 |
| Colorado | 6–5 | 9–2 | 6–5 | — | 7–4 | 5–6 | 5–7 | 7–4 | 6–5 | 4–7 | 4–7 | 4–8 | 4–8 | 7–4 | 9–7 |
| Florida | 8–4 | 9–2 | 6–5 | 4–7 | — | 7–4 | 7–4 | 7–5 | 4–8 | 6–6 | 7–4 | 5–6 | 5–6 | 5–6 | 12–3 |
| Houston | 4–7 | 9–3 | 7–5 | 6–5 | 4–7 | — | 7–4 | 8–3 | 7–4 | 4–7 | 6–6 | 6–5 | 3–8 | 9–3 | 4–11 |
| Los Angeles | 5–6 | 6–5 | 5–6 | 7–5 | 4–7 | 4–7 | — | 7–4 | 6–5 | 10–1 | 9–2 | 5–7 | 6–6 | 5–6 | 9–7 |
| Montreal | 2–10 | 7–4 | 5–6 | 4–7 | 5–7 | 3–8 | 4–7 | — | 5–7 | 6–6 | 5–6 | 8–3 | 6–5 | 6–5 | 12–3 |
| New York | 7–5 | 5–6 | 9–2 | 5–6 | 8–4 | 4–7 | 5–6 | 7–5 | — | 7–5 | 7–4 | 5–6 | 3–8 | 9–2 | 7–8 |
| Philadelphia | 2–10 | 5–6 | 3–8 | 7–4 | 6–6 | 7–4 | 1–10 | 6–6 | 5–7 | — | 5–6 | 7–4 | 3–8 | 6–5 | 5–10 |
| Pittsburgh | 6–5 | 5–7 | 4–8 | 7–4 | 4–7 | 6–6 | 2–9 | 6–5 | 4–7 | 6–5 | — | 5–6 | 8–3 | 9–3 | 7–8 |
| San Diego | 3–8 | 5–6 | 6–5 | 8–4 | 6–5 | 5–6 | 7–5 | 3–8 | 6–5 | 4–7 | 6–5 | — | 4–8 | 5–6 | 8–8 |
| San Francisco | 4–7 | 6–5 | 7–4 | 8–4 | 6–5 | 8–3 | 6–6 | 5–6 | 8–3 | 8–3 | 3–8 | 8–4 | — | 3–8 | 10–6 |
| St. Louis | 3–8 | 8–4 | 6–6 | 4–7 | 6–5 | 3–9 | 6–5 | 5–6 | 2–9 | 5–6 | 3–9 | 6–5 | 8–3 | — | 8–7 |

=== Roster ===
1997 San Francisco Giants
Roster
| Pitchers: 40 Wilson Álvarez; 43 René Arocha; 41 Cory Bailey; 47 Rod Beck; 29 Dan Carlson; 51 Doug Creek; 43 Danny Darwin; 41 Rich DeLucia; 55 Shawn Estes; 22 Osvaldo Fernández; 38 Keith Foulke; 26 Mark Gardner; 57 Doug Henry; 49 Roberto Hernández; 37,41 John Johnstone; 45 Terry Mulholland; 19 Jim Poole; 49 Pat Rapp; 37 Joe Roa; 33 Rich Rodriguez; 42,45,46 Kirk Rueter; 52 Julián Tavárez; 50 William Van Landingham | Catchers: 8 Damon Berryhill; 30 Marcus Jensen; 18 Brian Johnson; 2 Doug Mirabelli; 2 Rick Wilkins; Infielders: 35 Rich Aurilia; 36,38 Wilson Delgado; 21 Jeff Kent; 14 Mark Lewis; 32 Bill Mueller; 6 J. T. Snow; 10 José Vizcaíno | Outfielders: 7 Marvin Benard; 25 Barry Bonds; 30 Jacob Cruz; 5 Darryl Hamilton; 34 Glenallen Hill; 28 Stan Javier; 23 Dante Powell | Manager: 12 Dusty Baker; Coaches: 17 Carlos Alfonso (first base); 20 Gene Clines (hitting); 15 Sonny Jackson (third base); 16 Ron Perranoski (bench); 48 Dick Pole (pitching) |

=== Notable transactions ===
- August 8, 1997: William Van Landingham was released by the San Francisco Giants.
- August 19, 1997: William Van Landingham was signed as a free agent with the San Francisco Giants.

The White Flag Trade was a trade made in 1997. On July 31, 1997, the Chicago White Sox traded three major players to the San Francisco Giants for six minor leaguers. At the time, the trade was maligned by the vast majority of White Sox fans as Jerry Reinsdorf giving up on the team, as they were only 3.5 games behind the Cleveland Indians for the American League Central Division lead. In 2000, however, the White Sox won the Central Division title, receiving large contributions from two of the players received in this trade.

- The Chicago White Sox received:
  - Keith Foulke, right-handed pitcher
  - Bob Howry, right-handed pitcher
  - Lorenzo Barceló, right-handed pitcher
  - Ken Vining, left-handed pitcher
  - Mike Caruso, shortstop
  - Brian Manning
- The San Francisco Giants received:
  - Wilson Álvarez, left-handed pitcher
  - Danny Darwin, right-handed pitcher
  - Roberto Hernández, right-handed pitcher

== Player stats ==
=== Batting ===
Note: Pos = Position; G = Games played; AB = At bats; H = Hits; Avg. = Batting average; HR = Home runs; RBI = Runs batted in

| Pos | Player | G | AB | H | Avg. | HR | RBI |
|---|---|---|---|---|---|---|---|
| C | Rick Wilkins | 66 | 190 | 37 | .195 | 6 | 23 |
| 1B | J.T. Snow | 157 | 531 | 149 | .281 | 28 | 104 |
| 2B | Jeff Kent | 155 | 580 | 145 | .250 | 29 | 121 |
| SS | José Vizcaíno | 151 | 568 | 151 | .266 | 5 | 50 |
| 3B | Bill Mueller | 128 | 390 | 114 | .292 | 7 | 44 |
| LF | Barry Bonds | 159 | 532 | 155 | .291 | 40 | 101 |
| CF | Darryl Hamilton | 125 | 460 | 124 | .270 | 5 | 43 |
| RF | Glenallen Hill | 128 | 398 | 104 | .261 | 11 | 64 |

==== Other batters ====
Note: G = Games played; AB = At bats; H = Hits; Avg. = Batting average; HR = Home runs; RBI = Runs batted in

| Player | G | AB | H | Avg. | HR | RBI |
|---|---|---|---|---|---|---|
| Stan Javier | 142 | 440 | 126 | .286 | 8 | 50 |
| Mark Lewis | 118 | 341 | 91 | .267 | 10 | 42 |
| Brian Johnson | 56 | 179 | 50 | .279 | 11 | 27 |
| Damon Berryhill | 73 | 167 | 43 | .257 | 3 | 23 |
| Marvin Benard | 84 | 114 | 26 | .228 | 1 | 13 |
| Rich Aurilia | 46 | 102 | 28 | .275 | 5 | 19 |
| Marcus Jensen | 30 | 74 | 11 | .149 | 1 | 3 |
| Dante Powell | 27 | 39 | 12 | .308 | 1 | 3 |
| Jacob Cruz | 16 | 25 | 4 | .160 | 0 | 3 |
| Wilson Delgado | 8 | 7 | 1 | .143 | 0 | 0 |
| Doug Mirabelli | 6 | 7 | 1 | .143 | 0 | 0 |

=== Starting pitchers ===
Note: G = Games pitched; IP = Innings pitched; W = Wins; L = Losses; ERA = Earned run average; SO = Strikeouts

| Player | G | IP | W | L | ERA | SO |
|---|---|---|---|---|---|---|
| Shawn Estes | 32 | 201.0 | 19 | 5 | 3.18 | 181 |
| Kirk Rueter | 32 | 190.2 | 13 | 6 | 3.45 | 115 |
| Mark Gardner | 30 | 180.1 | 12 | 9 | 4.29 | 136 |
| William Van Landingham | 18 | 89.0 | 4 | 7 | 4.96 | 52 |
| Wilson Álvarez | 11 | 66.1 | 4 | 3 | 4.48 | 69 |
| Osvaldo Fernández | 11 | 56.1 | 3 | 4 | 4.95 | 31 |
| Keith Foulke | 11 | 44.2 | 1 | 5 | 8.26 | 33 |
| Danny Darwin | 10 | 44.0 | 1 | 3 | 4.91 | 30 |
| Pat Rapp | 8 | 33.0 | 1 | 2 | 6.00 | 28 |
| Doug Creek | 3 | 13.1 | 1 | 2 | 6.75 | 14 |

==== Other pitchers ====
Note: G = Games pitched; IP = Innings pitched; W = Wins; L = Losses; ERA = Earned run average; SO = Strikeouts

| Player | G | IP | W | L | ERA | SO |
|---|---|---|---|---|---|---|
| Joe Roa | 28 | 65.2 | 2 | 5 | 5.21 | 34 |
| Terry Mulholland | 15 | 29.2 | 0 | 1 | 5.16 | 25 |

===== Relief pitchers =====
Note: G = Games pitched; W = Wins; L = Losses; SV = Saves; ERA = Earned run average; SO = Strikeouts

| Player | G | W | L | SV | ERA | SO |
|---|---|---|---|---|---|---|
| Rod Beck | 73 | 7 | 4 | 37 | 3.47 | 53 |
| Julián Tavárez | 89 | 6 | 4 | 0 | 3.87 | 38 |
| Doug Henry | 75 | 4 | 5 | 3 | 4.71 | 69 |
| Rich Rodriguez | 71 | 4 | 3 | 1 | 3.17 | 32 |
| Jim Poole | 63 | 3 | 1 | 0 | 7.11 | 26 |
| Roberto Hernández | 28 | 5 | 2 | 4 | 2.48 | 35 |
| John Johnstone | 13 | 0 | 0 | 0 | 3.38 | 15 |
| Cory Bailey | 7 | 0 | 1 | 0 | 8.38 | 5 |
| Dan Carlson | 6 | 0 | 0 | 0 | 7.63 | 14 |
| René Arocha | 6 | 0 | 0 | 0 | 11.32 | 7 |
| Rich DeLucia | 3 | 0 | 0 | 0 | 10.80 | 2 |

== National League Divisional Playoffs ==
=== Florida Marlins vs. San Francisco Giants ===
Florida wins the series, 3–0

| Game | Home | Score | Visitor | Score | Date | Series |
|---|---|---|---|---|---|---|
| 1 | Florida | 2 | San Francisco | 1 | September 30 | 1-0 (FLA) |
| 2 | Florida | 7 | San Francisco | 6 | October 1 | 2-0 (FLA) |
| 3 | San Francisco | 2 | Florida | 6 | October 3 | 3-0 (FLA) |

== Award winners ==
- J. T. Snow 1B, Willie Mac Award

All-Star Game

== Farm system ==
| Level | Team | League | Manager |
|---|---|---|---|
| AAA | Phoenix Firebirds | Pacific Coast League | Ron Wotus |
| AA | Shreveport Captains | Texas League | Carlos Lezcano |
| A | Bakersfield Blaze | California League | Glenn Tufts and Keith Bodie |
| A | San Jose Giants | California League | Frank Cacciatore |
| A-Short Season | Salem-Keizer Volcanoes | Northwest League | Shane Turner |
