= Tom McGraw =

American baseball player (born 1967)

- Relief pitcher
- Born: December 8, 1967 (age 58); Portland, Oregon, U.S.
- Batted: Left Threw: Left

MLB debut
- May 7, 1997, for the St. Louis Cardinals

Last MLB appearance
- May 9, 1997, for the St. Louis Cardinals

MLB statistics
- Games pitched: 2
- Earned run average: 0.00
- Strikeouts: 0
- Stats at Baseball Reference

Teams
- St. Louis Cardinals (1997)

Thomas Virgil McGraw (born December 8, 1967) is an American former relief pitcher who played for the St. Louis Cardinals of Major League Baseball (MLB) during their 1997 season. Listed at 6' 2", 195 lb., McGraw batted and threw left-handed. He was born in Portland, Oregon.

McGraw attended Washington State University, where he pitched for the Cougars baseball team from 1987 to 1990.
