= 1997 Los Angeles Dodgers season =

1997 Los Angeles Dodgers
- League: National League
- Division: West
- Ballpark: Dodger Stadium
- City: Los Angeles
- Record: 88–74 (.543)
- Divisional place: 2nd
- Owners: Peter O'Malley
- General managers: Fred Claire
- Managers: Bill Russell
- Television: Fox Sports West 2; KTLA (5)
- Radio: KABC; Vin Scully, Ross Porter, Rick Monday; KWKW; Jaime Jarrín, René Cárdenas

The 1997 Los Angeles Dodgers season was the 108th for the franchise in Major League Baseball, and their 40th season in Los Angeles, California. The Dodgers were competitive all season long before finally fading down the stretch; the Dodgers finished in second place behind their longtime rivals, San Francisco Giants, in the National League West. The edition of the Dodgers had, for the second time in team history (and for the first time since 1977), four players crack the 30 home run barrier: Mike Piazza led the team with 40, Eric Karros and Todd Zeile hit 31 each, and Raul Mondesi hit 30.

== Offseason ==
- December 9, 1996: Acquired Jeff Berblinger from the Detroit Tigers for Deivi Cruz and Juan Hernaiz

== Regular season ==
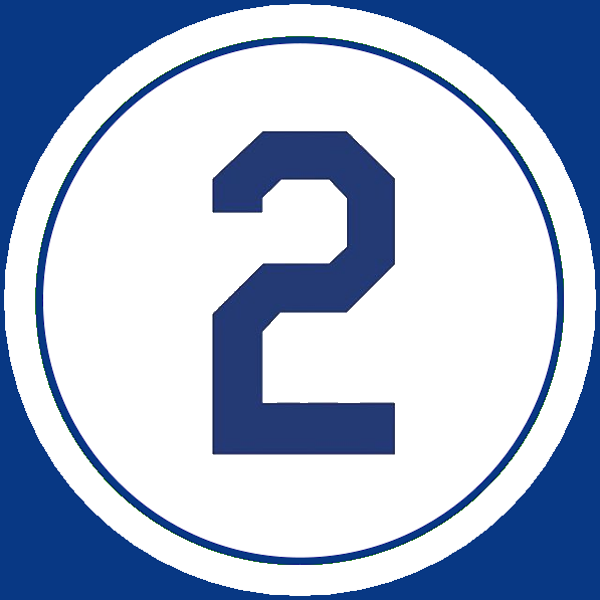
Tommy Lasorda's number 2 was retired by the Los Angeles Dodgers in 1997.

=== Season standings ===
NL West
Team	W	L	Pct.	GB	Home	Road
San Francisco Giants	90	72	.556	—	48‍–‍33	42‍–‍39
Los Angeles Dodgers	88	74	.543	2	47‍–‍34	41‍–‍40
Colorado Rockies	83	79	.512	7	47‍–‍34	36‍–‍45
San Diego Padres	76	86	.469	14	39‍–‍42	37‍–‍44

=== Record vs. opponents ===
1997 National League record Source: MLB Standings Grid – 1997
Team	ATL	CHC	CIN	COL	FLA	HOU	LAD	MON	NYM	PHI	PIT	SD	SF	STL	AL
Atlanta	—	9–2	9–2	5–6	4–8	7–4	6–5	10–2	5–7	10–2	5–6	8–3	7–4	8–3	8–7
Chicago	2–9	—	7–5	2–9	2–9	3–9	5–6	4–7	6–5	6–5	7–5	6–5	5–6	4–8	9–6
Cincinnati	2–9	5–7	—	5–6	5–6	5–7	6–5	6–5	2–9	8–3	8–4	5–6	4–7	6–6	9–6
Colorado	6–5	9–2	6–5	—	7–4	5–6	5–7	7–4	6–5	4–7	4–7	4–8	4–8	7–4	9–7
Florida	8–4	9–2	6–5	4–7	—	7–4	7–4	7–5	4–8	6–6	7–4	5–6	5–6	5–6	12–3
Houston	4–7	9–3	7–5	6–5	4–7	—	7–4	8–3	7–4	4–7	6–6	6–5	3–8	9–3	4–11
Los Angeles	5–6	6–5	5–6	7–5	4–7	4–7	—	7–4	6–5	10–1	9–2	5–7	6–6	5–6	9–7
Montreal	2–10	7–4	5–6	4–7	5–7	3–8	4–7	—	5–7	6–6	5–6	8–3	6–5	6–5	12–3
New York	7–5	5–6	9–2	5–6	8–4	4–7	5–6	7–5	—	7–5	7–4	5–6	3–8	9–2	7–8
Philadelphia	2–10	5–6	3–8	7–4	6–6	7–4	1–10	6–6	5–7	—	5–6	7–4	3–8	6–5	5–10
Pittsburgh	6–5	5–7	4–8	7–4	4–7	6–6	2–9	6–5	4–7	6–5	—	5–6	8–3	9–3	7–8
San Diego	3–8	5–6	6–5	8–4	6–5	5–6	7–5	3–8	6–5	4–7	6–5	—	4–8	5–6	8–8
San Francisco	4–7	6–5	7–4	8–4	6–5	8–3	6–6	5–6	8–3	8–3	3–8	8–4	—	3–8	10–6
St. Louis	3–8	8–4	6–6	4–7	6–5	3–9	6–5	5–6	2–9	5–6	3–9	6–5	8–3	—	8–7

=== Opening Day lineup ===
Opening Day starters
Name	Position
Brett Butler	Center fielder
Wilton Guerrero	Second baseman
Raúl Mondesí	Right fielder
Mike Piazza	Catcher
Eric Karros	First baseman
Todd Zeile	Third baseman
Todd Hollandsworth	Left fielder
Greg Gagne	Shortstop
Ramón Martínez	Starting pitcher

== Notable Transactions ==
- August 9, 1997: Acquired Hal Garrett from the Pittsburgh Pirates for Eddie Williams.
- August 12, 1997: Acquired Otis Nixon from the Toronto Blue Jays for Bobby Cripps.
- August 18, 1997: Acquired Eric Young from the Colorado Rockies for Pedro Astacio.
- August 27, 1997: Acquired Darren Lewis from the Chicago White Sox for Chad Fonville.
- September 3, 1997: Chip Hale was released by the Los Angeles Dodgers.

=== Roster ===
1997 Los Angeles Dodgers
Roster
Pitchers: 56 Pedro Astacio; 49 Tom Candiotti; 37 Darren Dreifort; 55 Rick Gorecki; 44 Mark Guthrie; 52 Darren Hall; 50 Mike Harkey; 60 Mike Judd; 48 Ramón Martínez; 16 Hideo Nomo; 13 Antonio Osuna; 61 Chan Ho Park; 36 Scott Radinsky; 57 Dennys Reyes; 59 Ismael Valdez; 38 Todd Worrell	Catchers: 31 Mike Piazza; 15 Tom Prince; Infielders: 54 Henry Blanco; 25 Juan Castro; 41 Tripp Cromer; 3 Chad Fonville; 7 Greg Gagne; 30 Wilton Guerrero; 5 Chip Hale; 23 Eric Karros; 66 Paul Konerko; 46 Nelson Liriano; 51 Adam Riggs; 26 Eric Young; 27 Todd Zeile	Outfielders: 29 Eric Anthony; 21 Billy Ashley; 22 Brett Butler; 45 Roger Cedeño; 12 Karim García; 28 Todd Hollandsworth; 56 Garey Ingram; 35 Wayne Kirby; 20 Darren Lewis; 43 Raúl Mondesí; 10 Otis Nixon; Other batters: 33 Eddie Murray; 26 Eddie Williams	Manager: 18 Bill Russell; Coaches: 8 Joey Amalfitano (third base); 58 Mark Cresse (bullpen); 11 Manny Mota; 14 Mike Scioscia (bench); 9 Reggie Smith (hitting/1st base); 17 Dave Wallace (pitching)

== Starting Pitchers stats ==
Note: G = Games pitched; GS = Games started; IP = Innings pitched; W/L = Wins/Losses; ERA = Earned run average; BB = Walks allowed; SO = Strikeouts; CG = Complete games

Name	G	GS	IP	W/L	ERA	BB	SO	CG
Hideo Nomo	33	33	207.1	14-12	4.25	92	233	1
Ismael Valdez	30	30	196.2	10-11	2.65	47	140	0
Chan Ho Park	32	29	192.0	14-8	3.38	70	166	2
Pedro Astacio	26	24	153.2	7-9	4.10	47	115	2
Ramón Martínez	22	22	133.2	10-5	3.64	68	120	1

== Relief Pitchers stats ==
Note: G = Games pitched; GS = Games started; IP = Innings pitched; W/L = Wins/Losses; ERA = Earned run average; BB = Walks allowed; SO = Strikeouts; SV = Saves

Name	G	GS	IP	W/L	ERA	BB	SO	SV
Todd Worrell	65	0	59.2	2-6	5.28	23	61	35
Scott Radinsky	75	0	62.1	5-1	2.89	21	44	3
Darren Hall	63	0	54.2	3-2	2.30	26	39	2
Mark Guthrie	62	0	69.1	1-4	5.32	30	42	1
Darren Dreifort	48	0	63.0	5-2	2.86	34	63	4
Tom Candiotti	41	18	135.0	10-7	3.60	40	90	0
Antonio Osuna	48	0	61.2	3-4	2.19	19	68	0
Dennys Reyes	14	5	47.0	2-3	3.83	18	36	0
Mike Harkey	10	0	14.2	1-0	4.30	5	6	0
Rick Gorecki	4	1	6.0	1-0	15.00	6	6	0
Mike Judd	1	0	2.2	0-0	0.00	0	4	0

== Batting Stats ==
Note: Pos = Position; G = Games played; AB = At bats; Avg. = Batting average; R = Runs scored; H = Hits; HR = Home runs; RBI = Runs batted in; SB = Stolen bases

Name	Pos	G	AB	Avg.	R	H	HR	RBI	SB
Mike Piazza	C	152	556	.362	104	201	40	124	5
Tom Prince	C	47	100	.220	17	22	3	14	0
Eric Karros	1B	162	628	.266	86	167	31	104	15
Wilton Guerrero	2B/SS	111	357	.291	39	104	4	32	6
Greg Gagne	SS	144	514	.251	49	129	9	57	2
Todd Zeile	3B	160	575	.268	89	154	31	90	8
Eric Young	2B	37	154	.273	28	42	2	16	13
Nelson Liriano	2B/SS/3B/1B	76	88	.227	10	20	1	11	0
Tripp Cromer	2B/SS	28	86	.291	8	25	4	20	0
Juan Castro	SS/2B/3B	40	75	.147	3	11	0	4	0
Adam Riggs	2B	9	20	.200	3	4	0	1	1
Chad Fonville	2B	9	14	.143	1	2	0	1	0
Chip Hale	3B	14	12	.083	0	1	0	0	0
Paul Konerko	1B/3B	6	7	.143	0	1	0	0	0
Eddie Murray	1B	9	7	.286	0	2	0	3	0
Eddie Williams	1B	8	7	.143	0	1	0	1	0
Henry Blanco	1B	3	5	.400	1	2	1	1	0
Raúl Mondesí	RF	159	616	.310	95	191	30	87	32
Roger Cedeño	CF/LF/RF	80	194	.273	31	53	3	17	9
Todd Hollandsworth	LF/CF/RF	106	296	.247	39	73	4	31	5
Brett Butler	CF/LF	105	343	.283	52	97	0	18	15
Otis Nixon	CF	42	175	.274	30	48	1	18	12
Billy Ashley	LF	71	131	.244	12	32	6	19	0
Darren Lewis	LF/CF/RF	26	77	.299	7	23	1	10	3
Eric Anthony	LF/RF	47	74	.243	8	18	2	5	2
Wayne Kirby	CF/LF/RF	46	65	.169	6	11	0	4	0
Karim García	LF/RF	15	39	.128	5	5	1	8	0
Garey Ingram	LF/CF	12	9	.444	2	4	0	1	1

== 1997 Awards ==
- 1997 Major League Baseball All-Star Game
  - Mike Piazza starter
- Gold Glove Award
  - Raúl Mondesí
- Silver Slugger Award
  - Mike Piazza
- TSN National League All-Star
  - Mike Piazza
- NL Player of the Month
  - Mike Piazza (July 1997)
  - Mike Piazza (August 1997)
- NL Player of the Week
  - Mike Piazza (Aug. 25–31)

== Farm system ==
Level	Team	League	Manager
AAA	Albuquerque Dukes	Pacific Coast League	Glenn Hoffman
**AA**	**San Antonio Missions**	**Texas League**	**Ron Roenicke**
High A	San Bernardino Stampede	California League	Del Crandall; Dino Ebel
High A	Vero Beach Dodgers	Florida State League	John Shoemaker
A	Savannah Sand Gnats	South Atlantic League	John Shelby
A-Short Season	Yakima Bears	Northwest League	Joe Vavra
Rookie	Great Falls Dodgers	Pioneer League	Mickey Hatcher
Rookie	DSL Dodgers; DSL Dodgers 2	Dominican Summer League	
Rookie	Adelaide Giants	Australian Baseball League	

Teams in BOLD won League Championships

== Major League Baseball draft ==
The Dodgers selected 71 players in this draft. Of those, seven of them would eventually play Major League baseball. They received an extra supplemental pick in the second round as a result of losing free agent Delino DeShields.

The first round pick was first baseman Glenn Davis from Vanderbilt University. In eight seasons in the minors, he never advanced past AA. He hit .242 in 802 minor league games with 108 homers and 431 RBI. With their second round pick, the Dodgers picked shortstop Chase Utley from Polytechnic High School in Long Beach, California. However, Utley refused to sign and went to college instead. He was eventually a first round pick of the Philadelphia Phillies in 2000 and became a multi-time All-Star.

None of the players signed by the Dodgers in this draft class had a significant major league career.

1997 draft picks

Round	Name	Position	School	Signed	Career span	Highest level
1	Glenn Davis	1B	Vanderbilt University	Yes	1997–2004	AA
2	Chase Utley	SS	Polytechnic High School	No; Phillies-2000	2000–2018	**MLB**
2s	Steve Colyer	LHP	Fort Zumwalt South High School	Yes	1998–2007	**MLB**
3	Ricky Bell	SS	Moeller High School	Yes	1997–2006	AAA
4	John Hernandez	C	Nogales High School	Yes	1997–2010	AAA
5	Kip Harkrider	SS	University of Texas at Austin	Yes	1997–2007	AA
6	Will McCrotty	C	Russellville High School	Yes	1997–2003	AA
7	Miles Durham	OF	Cooper High School	No; Tigers-2000	2000–2002	A
8	Beau Parker	RHP	Prairie High School	Yes	1997–1999	A-
9	Jaime Goudie	SS	Hardaway High School	Yes	1997–2001	AA
10	Joe Patterson	OF	Ontario High School	No		
11	Cory Vance	LHP	Butler High School	No; Rockies-2000	2000–2005	**MLB**
12	David Lamberth	SS	Macon County High School	No		
13	Matt Bornyk	RHP	Esquimalt High School	Yes	1997–1998	A-
14	Brent Husted	RHP	University of Nevada, Reno	Yes	1997–2002	AAA
15	David Mittauer	RHP	Dade Christian High School	No		
16	Scott Walter	C	Loyola High School	No; Royals-2000	2000–2005	AAA
17	Chad Cislak	RHP	Sabino High School	No; Indians-2000	2000–2001	Rookie
18	Mike Balbuena	3B	Key West High School	Yes	1997–1998	A-
19	Shane Allen	OF	Glenns Ferry High School	Yes	1997–1999	A-
20	Pete Zamora	1B	University of California, Los Angeles	Yes	1997–2005	AAA
21	Steve Verigood	LHP	Spartanburg Methodist College	Yes	1997–1998	A-
22	Matt Montgomery	RHP	California State University, Long Beach	Yes	1997–2006	AAA
23	Jared Moon	RHP	Redondo Beach High School	Yes	1997–1999	A-
24	Mike Rawls	LHP	Bethune-Cookman University	Yes	1997	A-
25	Dave Detienne	3B	Auburn Drive High School	Yes	1998–2008	AAA
26	Bill Everly	RHP	West Virginia Wesleyan College	Yes	1997–2000	AAA
27	Aaron Dean	1B	Lamar University	Yes	1997–2005	A+
28	Richard Bell	LHP	California Lutheran University	No	1998–2005	AAA
29	Darin Schmalz	RHP	University of Notre Dame	Yes	1997	A-
30	Sam Lopez	SS	Dinuba High School	No; Mets-1999	1999	A-
31	Wayne Slater	OF	Bethune-Cookman University	Yes	1997–1998	A-
32	Shaylar Hatch	RHP		No		
33	Shaun Benzor	LHP	Redlands High School	No		
34	Blake McGinley	LHP	North Bakersfield High School	No; Mets-2001	2001–2007	AAA
35	Adam Thomas	OF	Hazel Park High School	No		
36	Jesús Feliciano	OF	Academia Discipulos de Cristo	Yes	1998–2013	**MLB**
37	Tyler Renwick	RHP	New Mexico Junior College	No; Blue Jays-1998	1998–2001	AAA
38	Eliot Joynet	OF	Mt. San Jacinto College	No		
39	Jahseam George	LHP	Dr. Floyd B. Buchanan High School	No; Indians-2002	2002	A-
40	John Nelson	SS	Denton High School	No; Cardinals-2001	2001–2008	**MLB**
41	Ryan Beaver	RHP	Millikan High School	No		
42	Carlos Orozco	OF	Montgomery High School	No		
43	Michael Hernandez	LHP	Carson High School	No		-
44	Graig Merritt	C	College of Southern Idaho	No; Devil Rays-2001	2001–2005	AA
45	Shane Youman	LHP	New Iberia High School	No; Pirates-2002	2002–2016	**MLB**
46	Ryan Kellner	C	Spartanburg Methodist College	Yes	1998–2005	AAA
47	Jean Emard	LHP	Ployvalente Edouard Montpetit	No		
48	Luis DeJesus	C	Miguel de Cervantes High School	No		
49	Lance Warren	C	Richmond High School	Yes	1997–1998	A+
50	Chris Howay	RHP	New Westminster High School	No; Athletics-2002	2001–2004	A-
51	Eric Burris	1B	Los Angeles Harbor College	No		
52	Russell Ivory	OF	Grossmont College	No		
53	Ismael Garcia	2B	Mt. San Antonio College	Yes	1998–2003	A-
54	Michael Ford	OF	Elk Grove High School	No		
55	Melvin Anderson	3B	North Iverville High School	No; Phillies-2000	2000–2003	A
56	Reggie Laplante	RHP	Polyvalente Edouard Montpetit	No; Yankees-1999	1999–2003	A
57	George Bailey	3B	Indian River Community College	No	2000	Ind
58	James Howard	RHP	Allen D Nease High School	No		
59	Joshua Ridgway	SS	Delta Secondary School	No		
60	Jason Ware	1B	Long Beach City College	No		
61	Javier Gonzalez	RHP	Mt. San Antonio College	No		
62	Steve Holm	SS	McClatchy High School	No; Giants-2001	2001–2012	**MLB**
63	Cedric Herbert	RHP	Grayson County College	No		
64	Jeremy Loftice	RHP	Truett-McConnell College	No		
65	Luis Fontanez	C	Juano Colon High School	No		
66	John Castellano	C	Indian River Community College	Yes	1998–2006	AAA
67	Cory Stephen	C	Martin Collegiate Institute	No		
68	Matt Ybarra	C	Encinal High School	No		
69	Luis Medina	C	Pedro Casa Blanca High School	No		
70	Ryan Withey	OF	Seminole Community College	No; Angels-2000	2000–2001	A
