= 1997 St. Louis Cardinals season =

Major League Baseball season

1997 St. Louis Cardinals
- League: National League
- Division: Central
- Ballpark: Busch Memorial Stadium
- City: St. Louis, Missouri
- Record: 73–89 (.451)
- Divisional place: 4th
- Owners: William DeWitt, Jr.
- General managers: Walt Jocketty
- Managers: Tony La Russa
- Television: Fox Sports Midwest; KPLR (Al Hrabosky, Bob Carpenter, Joe Buck, Bob Ramsey, Ozzie Smith, Rich Gould)
- Radio: KMOX (Jack Buck, Mike Shannon, Joe Buck)

The 1997 St. Louis Cardinals season was the team's 116th season in St. Louis, Missouri and the 106th season in the National League. The Cardinals went 73–89 during the season and finished fourth in the National League Central division, 11 games behind the Houston Astros.

== Offseason ==
- December 4, 1996: Willie McGee was signed as a free agent by the Cardinals.
- December 6, 1996: Tom Pagnozzi was signed as a free agent with the St. Louis Cardinals.

== Regular season ==
=== Season standings ===
NL Central
Team	W	L	Pct.	GB	Home	Road
Houston Astros	84	78	.519	—	46‍–‍35	38‍–‍43
Pittsburgh Pirates	79	83	.488	5	43‍–‍38	36‍–‍45
Cincinnati Reds	76	86	.469	8	40‍–‍41	36‍–‍45
St. Louis Cardinals	73	89	.451	11	41‍–‍40	32‍–‍49
Chicago Cubs	68	94	.420	16	42‍–‍39	26‍–‍55

=== Record vs. opponents ===
1997 National League record Source: MLB Standings Grid – 1997
Team	ATL	CHC	CIN	COL	FLA	HOU	LAD	MON	NYM	PHI	PIT	SD	SF	STL	AL
Atlanta	—	9–2	9–2	5–6	4–8	7–4	6–5	10–2	5–7	10–2	5–6	8–3	7–4	8–3	8–7
Chicago	2–9	—	7–5	2–9	2–9	3–9	5–6	4–7	6–5	6–5	7–5	6–5	5–6	4–8	9–6
Cincinnati	2–9	5–7	—	5–6	5–6	5–7	6–5	6–5	2–9	8–3	8–4	5–6	4–7	6–6	9–6
Colorado	6–5	9–2	6–5	—	7–4	5–6	5–7	7–4	6–5	4–7	4–7	4–8	4–8	7–4	9–7
Florida	8–4	9–2	6–5	4–7	—	7–4	7–4	7–5	4–8	6–6	7–4	5–6	5–6	5–6	12–3
Houston	4–7	9–3	7–5	6–5	4–7	—	7–4	8–3	7–4	4–7	6–6	6–5	3–8	9–3	4–11
Los Angeles	5–6	6–5	5–6	7–5	4–7	4–7	—	7–4	6–5	10–1	9–2	5–7	6–6	5–6	9–7
Montreal	2–10	7–4	5–6	4–7	5–7	3–8	4–7	—	5–7	6–6	5–6	8–3	6–5	6–5	12–3
New York	7–5	5–6	9–2	5–6	8–4	4–7	5–6	7–5	—	7–5	7–4	5–6	3–8	9–2	7–8
Philadelphia	2–10	5–6	3–8	7–4	6–6	7–4	1–10	6–6	5–7	—	5–6	7–4	3–8	6–5	5–10
Pittsburgh	6–5	5–7	4–8	7–4	4–7	6–6	2–9	6–5	4–7	6–5	—	5–6	8–3	9–3	7–8
San Diego	3–8	5–6	6–5	8–4	6–5	5–6	7–5	3–8	6–5	4–7	6–5	—	4–8	5–6	8–8
San Francisco	4–7	6–5	7–4	8–4	6–5	8–3	6–6	5–6	8–3	8–3	3–8	8–4	—	3–8	10–6
St. Louis	3–8	8–4	6–6	4–7	6–5	3–9	6–5	5–6	2–9	5–6	3–9	6–5	8–3	—	8–7

=== Roster ===
1997 St. Louis Cardinals
Roster
Pitchers: 38 Manny Aybar; 44 Rich Batchelor; 33 José Bautista; 53 Rigo Beltrán; 41 Alan Benes; 40 Andy Benes; 54 Mike Busby; 43 Dennis Eckersley; 48 Tony Fossas; 50 John Frascatore; 32 Rick Honeycutt; 29 Danny Jackson; 57 Curtis King; 34 Sean Lowe; 54 Eric Ludwick; 33 T. J. Mathews; 61 Tom McGraw; 35 Matt Morris; 31 Donovan Osborne; 28 Lance Painter; 46 Mark Petkovsek; 64 Brady Raggio; 30 Todd Stottlemyre; 34 Fernando Valenzuela	Catchers: 37 Mike DiFelice; 49 Tom Lampkin; 26 Eli Marrero; 19 Tom Pagnozzi; Infielders: 27 David Bell; 56 Jeff Berblinger; 11 Royce Clayton; 7 Delino DeShields; 8 Gary Gaetti; 22 Mike Gallego; 53 Mike Gulan; 29 Scott Livingstone; 25 Mark McGwire; 67 Roberto Mejía; 52 Luis Ordaz; 38 Steve Scarsone; 12 Danny Sheaffer; 24 Dmitri Young	Outfielders: 68 Micah Franklin; 5 Ron Gant; 22 Scarborough Green; 3 Brian Jordan; 16 Ray Lankford; 47 John Mabry; 51 Willie McGee; 23 Phil Plantier; 23 Mark Sweeney	Manager: 10 Tony La Russa; Coaches: 18 Dave Duncan (Pitching); 34 Mark DeJohn (Bullpen); 25 George Hendrick (Hitting); 15 Rene Lachemann (Third Base); 4 Carney Lansford (Bench); 39 Dave McKay (First Base)

=== Transactions ===
- June 3, 1997: 1997 Major League Baseball draft
  - Rick Ankiel was drafted by the Cardinals in the 2nd round. Player signed August 28, 1997.
  - Xavier Nady was drafted by the Cardinals in the 4th round, but did not sign.
  - José Rodríguez was drafted by the Cardinals in the 24th round. Player signed July 15, 1997.
- June 13, 1997: Danny Jackson, Mark Sweeney and Rich Batchelor were traded by the Cardinals to the San Diego Padres for Scott Livingstone, Phil Plantier, and Fernando Valenzuela.
- July 29, 1997: Mike Gallego was released by the Cardinals.

== The Trade ==
The beginning came on July 31, when the Cardinals acquired Mark McGwire from the Oakland Athletics in exchange for relief pitcher T.J. Mathews and minor league pitchers Eric Ludwick and Blake Stein. McGwire could have been a free agent at the end of the season.

McGwire had 34 home runs and 81 RBIs with Oakland at the time of the trade, which reunited him with former Athletics manager Tony La Russa. The Cardinals were considered to have little chance of keeping him with the club beyond the final two months of the season. But general manager Walt Jocketty's deal figured to inject some excitement into a dull close to the season, since the Cardinals were far out of the race. They had begun their freefall in early July when left fielder Ron Gant had failed to make a routine catch which would have given the Cardinals a victory over the Pittsburgh Pirates. Not only did the Pirates rally for that victory, but they also ended up sweeping the four-game series, knocking the Cardinals out of first place, and sending them reeling.

McGwire hadn't expected to stay with Oakland, but he also didn't think he would end up with the Cardinals.

=== McGwire's Impact ===
The team was in the throes of a slump when their new first baseman arrived. On August 10, the Cardinals had lost 11 of their last 14 games. They had scored a total of 58 runs scored in their 21 previous games at that point.

McGwire struggled to hit anything at first but had four home runs with his new team in less than two weeks, including two in an August 13 game that featured a 455-foot dinger, one of the longest in Busch Stadium history.

=== September Booms ===
On September 3, the same day pitcher Alan Benes underwent rotate cuff surgery, McGwire hit the first Busch Stadium home run that was measured at more than 500 feet—504 feet, to be exact—hit on a pitch from Jaime Navarro of the Chicago White Sox.

A week later, he hit his 16th homer since joining the Cardinals but his 50th overall for the season, making him only the second man in baseball history-Babe Ruth did it twice-to reach the 50-homer mark in successive seasons

McGwire's biggest blasts might have come on September 17. That afternoon, the Cardinals announced they had signed him to a three-year, $28.5 million contract with an option for a fourth season at $11 million. He announced at the news conference that part of the deal included the formation of a charitable foundation to fight sexual and physical abuse of children, a fight strengthened by his donation of $1 million a year. McGwire choked up and wiped away tears as he talked of that cause, something close to his heart because of a close friend who had suffered such abuse.

He had decided to stay in St. Louis, McGwire said, because of the overwhelming affection shown him by Cardinals fans. Never did he feel it so much as when he stepped to the plate for his first at bat after signing his contract that day. With Los Angeles Dodgers pitcher Ramón Hernández on the mound at Busch, the crowd of 27,157 fans stood for a standing ovation at the announcement of McGwire's name. No one stopped cheering as Martinez threw ball one, then ball two, strike one and ball three. They all remained on their feet and screaming as Martinez fired the fifth pitch of the at bat, which McGwire hit 517 feet for the then-longest home run in stadium history, an upper-deck shot over the left-field scoreboard. it was McGwire's fifth homer of more than 500 feet that season and his 18th home run since joining the Cardinals 48 days earlier.

With two homers on the second-to-last day of the season and one more in the season finale. McGwire ended with 24 homers in the Cardinals uniform and 58 overall for the season. That was a single-season for a right-handed batter and fueled a winter of speculation that he might be the chosen one to break Roger Maris's hallowed record.

== Player stats ==
=== Batting ===
==== Starters by position ====
Note: Pos = Position; G = Games played; AB = At bats; H = Hits; Avg. = Batting average; HR = Home runs; RBI = Runs batted in

Pos	Player	G	AB	H	Avg.	HR	RBI
C	Mike Difelice	93	260	62	.238	4	30
1B	Dmitri Young	110	333	86	.258	5	34
2B	Delino DeShields	150	572	169	.295	11	58
SS	Royce Clayton	154	576	153	.266	9	61
3B	Gary Gaetti	148	502	126	.251	17	69
LF	Ron Gant	139	502	115	.229	17	62
CF	Ray Lankford	133	465	137	.295	31	98
RF	John Mabry	116	388	110	.284	5	36

==== Other batters ====
Note: G = Games played; AB = At bats; H = Hits; Avg. = Batting average; HR = Home runs; RBI = Runs batted in

Player	G	AB	H	Avg.	HR	RBI
Willie McGee	122	300	90	.300	3	38
Tom Lampkin	108	229	56	.245	7	22
Mark McGwire	51	174	44	.253	24	42
Brian Jordan	47	145	34	.234	0	10
David Bell	66	142	30	.211	1	12
Danny Sheaffer	76	132	33	.250	0	11
Phil Plantier	42	113	29	.257	5	18
Mark Sweeney	44	61	13	.213	0	4
Tom Pagnozzi	25	50	11	.220	1	8
Eli Marrero	17	45	11	.244	2	7
Mike Gallego	27	43	7	.163	0	1
Scott Livingstone	42	41	7	.171	0	3
Micah Franklin	17	34	11	.324	2	2
Scarborough Green	20	31	3	.097	0	1
Luis Ordaz	12	22	6	.273	0	1
Roberto Mejía	7	14	1	.071	0	2
Steve Scarsone	5	10	1	.100	0	0
Mike Gulan	5	9	0	.000	0	1
Jeff Berblinger	7	5	0	.000	0	0

=== Pitching ===
==== Starting pitchers ====
Note: G = Games pitched; IP = Innings pitched; W = Wins; L = Losses; ERA = Earned run average; SO = Strikeouts

Player	G	IP	W	L	ERA	SO
Matt Morris	33	217.0	12	9	3.19	149
Todd Stottlemyre	28	181.0	12	9	3.88	160
Andy Benes	26	177.0	10	7	3.10	175
Alan Benes	23	161.2	9	9	2.89	160
Donovan Osborne	14	80.1	3	7	4.93	51
Manny Aybar	12	68.0	2	4	4.24	41
Fernando Valenzuela	5	22.2	0	4	5.56	10
Danny Jackson	4	18.2	1	2	7.71	13
Mike Busby	3	14.1	0	2	8.79	6

==== Other pitchers ====
Note: G = Games pitched; IP = Innings pitched; W = Wins; L = Losses; ERA = Earned run average; SO = Strikeouts

Player	G	IP	W	L	ERA	SO
Brady Raggio	15	31.1	1	2	6.89	21
Sean Lowe	6	17.1	0	2	9.35	8

==== Relief pitchers ====
Note: G = Games pitched; W = Wins; L = Losses; SV = Saves; ERA = Earned run average; SO = Strikeouts

Player	G	W	L	SV	ERA	SO
Dennis Eckersley	57	1	5	36	3.91	45
Tony Fossas	71	2	7	0	3.83	41
John Frascatore	59	5	2	0	2.48	58
Mark Petkovsek	55	4	7	2	5.06	51
T.J. Mathews	40	4	4	0	2.15	46
Rigo Beltrán	35	1	2	1	3.48	50
Curtis King	30	4	2	0	2.76	13
Lance Painter	14	1	1	0	4.76	11
José Bautista	11	0	0	0	6.57	4
Rich Batchelor	10	1	1	0	4.50	8
Eric Ludwick	5	0	1	0	9.45	7
Rick Honeycutt	2	0	0	0	13.50	2
Tom McGraw	2	0	0	0	0.00	0
Gary Gaetti	1	0	0	0	0.00	0

== Awards and honors ==
- St. Louis Baseball Man of the Year: Ray Lankford
- Mark McGwire, Major League record, 1st player to lead the Major Leagues in Home Runs but not lead the American League or National League in home runs

== Farm system ==
Level	Team	League	Manager
AAA	Louisville Redbirds	American Association	Gaylen Pitts
AA	Arkansas Travelers	Texas League	Rick Mahler
A	Prince William Cannons	Carolina League	Roy Silver
A	Peoria Chiefs	Midwest League	Joe Cunningham, Jr.
A-Short Season	New Jersey Cardinals	New York–Penn League	Jeff Shireman
Rookie	Johnson City Cardinals	Appalachian League	Steve Turco
