= 1997 Chicago Cubs season =

1997 Chicago Cubs
- League: National League
- Division: Central
- Ballpark: Wrigley Field
- City: Chicago
- Record: 68–94 (.420)
- Divisional place: 5th
- Owners: Tribune Company
- General managers: Ed Lynch
- Managers: Jim Riggleman
- Television: WGN-TV/Superstation WGN/Chicagoland TV (Harry Caray, Steve Stone, Josh Lewin)
- Radio: WGN (Pat Hughes, Ron Santo, Harry Caray, Josh Lewin)
- Stats: ESPN.com; Baseball Reference

The 1997 Chicago Cubs season was the 126th season of the Chicago Cubs franchise, the 122nd in the National League and the 82nd at Wrigley Field. The Cubs finished fifth and last in the National League Central with a record of 68–94. The team never had a record above .500 at any point during the season.

The Cubs lost the first 14 games of the season, before finally winning the second game of a double-header against the New York Mets. The 0–14 start brought the superstition of the "billy goat curse" to the forefront, and at one point a goat was actually led around Wrigley Field in an effort to end the curse.

This was also Harry Caray's final season as broadcaster for the Cubs, as he died on February 18, 1998 (two months after his grandson Chip Caray was hired to share play-by-play duties with him). The team would wear a patch with his likeness that year.

The Cubs' Sept. 25 game at Houston, which they ultimately lost 9-1, can be seen in the first episode of the fourth season of the NBC television drama ER. The episode, titled "Ambush," was the medical drama's much hyped and famous live episode. At one point in the episode, Dr. Doug Ross, portrayed by George Clooney, remarks that the Cubs were trailing 7-1 in the seventh inning.

== Offseason ==
- December 10, 1996: Mel Rojas was signed as a free agent with the Chicago Cubs.

== Regular season ==
- June 16 – The first interleague game between the Chicago Cubs and Chicago White Sox took place at the new Comiskey Park. The Cubs won the game by a score of 8–3.

=== Season standings ===
NL Central
Team	W	L	Pct.	GB	Home	Road
Houston Astros	84	78	.519	—	46‍–‍35	38‍–‍43
Pittsburgh Pirates	79	83	.488	5	43‍–‍38	36‍–‍45
Cincinnati Reds	76	86	.469	8	40‍–‍41	36‍–‍45
St. Louis Cardinals	73	89	.451	11	41‍–‍40	32‍–‍49
Chicago Cubs	68	94	.420	16	42‍–‍39	26‍–‍55

=== Record vs. opponents ===
1997 National League record Source: MLB Standings Grid – 1997
Team	ATL	CHC	CIN	COL	FLA	HOU	LAD	MON	NYM	PHI	PIT	SD	SF	STL	AL
Atlanta	—	9–2	9–2	5–6	4–8	7–4	6–5	10–2	5–7	10–2	5–6	8–3	7–4	8–3	8–7
Chicago	2–9	—	7–5	2–9	2–9	3–9	5–6	4–7	6–5	6–5	7–5	6–5	5–6	4–8	9–6
Cincinnati	2–9	5–7	—	5–6	5–6	5–7	6–5	6–5	2–9	8–3	8–4	5–6	4–7	6–6	9–6
Colorado	6–5	9–2	6–5	—	7–4	5–6	5–7	7–4	6–5	4–7	4–7	4–8	4–8	7–4	9–7
Florida	8–4	9–2	6–5	4–7	—	7–4	7–4	7–5	4–8	6–6	7–4	5–6	5–6	5–6	12–3
Houston	4–7	9–3	7–5	6–5	4–7	—	7–4	8–3	7–4	4–7	6–6	6–5	3–8	9–3	4–11
Los Angeles	5–6	6–5	5–6	7–5	4–7	4–7	—	7–4	6–5	10–1	9–2	5–7	6–6	5–6	9–7
Montreal	2–10	7–4	5–6	4–7	5–7	3–8	4–7	—	5–7	6–6	5–6	8–3	6–5	6–5	12–3
New York	7–5	5–6	9–2	5–6	8–4	4–7	5–6	7–5	—	7–5	7–4	5–6	3–8	9–2	7–8
Philadelphia	2–10	5–6	3–8	7–4	6–6	7–4	1–10	6–6	5–7	—	5–6	7–4	3–8	6–5	5–10
Pittsburgh	6–5	5–7	4–8	7–4	4–7	6–6	2–9	6–5	4–7	6–5	—	5–6	8–3	9–3	7–8
San Diego	3–8	5–6	6–5	8–4	6–5	5–6	7–5	3–8	6–5	4–7	6–5	—	4–8	5–6	8–8
San Francisco	4–7	6–5	7–4	8–4	6–5	8–3	6–6	5–6	8–3	8–3	3–8	8–4	—	3–8	10–6
St. Louis	3–8	8–4	6–6	4–7	6–5	3–9	6–5	5–6	2–9	5–6	3–9	6–5	8–3	—	8–7

=== Notable transactions ===
- July 12, 1997: Carlos Zambrano was signed by the Chicago Cubs as an amateur free agent.
- August 8, 1997: Brian McRae was traded by the Chicago Cubs with Mel Rojas and Turk Wendell to the New York Mets for players to be named later and Lance Johnson. The New York Mets sent Mark Clark (August 11, 1997) and Manny Alexander (August 14, 1997) to the Chicago Cubs to complete the trade.

== Roster ==
1997 Chicago Cubs
Roster
Pitchers: 33,51 Terry Adams; 47 Miguel Batista; 34,45 Kent Bottenfield; 55 Larry Casian; 49 Frank Castillo; 48 Mark Clark; 31 Kevin Foster; 54 Geremi González; 33 Ramón Morel; 45 Terry Mulholland; 59 Rodney Myers; 35 Bob Patterson; 41 Marc Pisciotta; 51 Mel Rojas; 40 Dave Stevens; 38 Dave Swartzbaugh; 36 Kevin Tapani; 52 Ramón Tatís; 44 Amaury Telemaco; 46 Steve Trachsel; 13 Turk Wendell	Catchers: 7 Tyler Houston; 6 Mike Hubbard; 9 Scott Servais; Infielders: 24 Manny Alexander; 20 Miguel Cairo; 17 Mark Grace; 25 Dave Hansen; 18 José Hernández; 15 Kevin Orie; 11 Rey Sánchez; 23 Ryne Sandberg; Outfielders: 37 Brant Brown; 22 Dave Clark; 12 Shawon Dunston; 1,8 Doug Glanville; 29 Robin Jennings; 1 Lance Johnson; 19 Brooks Kieschnick; 10 Terrell Lowery; 56 Brian McRae; 21 Sammy Sosa	Manager: 5 Jim Riggleman; Coaches: 43 Dave Bialas (bullpen); 40 Tony Muser (former hitting); 2 Mako Oliveras (first base); 55 Jeff Pentland (hitting); 3 Dan Radison (third base); 27 Phil Regan (pitching); 26 Billy Williams (bench)

== Player stats ==
=== Batting ===
==== Starters by position ====
Note: Pos = Position; G = Games played; AB = At bats; H = Hits; Avg. = Batting average; HR = Home runs; RBI = Runs batted in

Pos	Player	G	AB	H	Avg.	HR	RBI
C	Scott Servais	122	385	100	.260	6	45
1B	Mark Grace	151	555	177	.319	13	78
2B	Ryne Sandberg	135	447	118	.264	12	64
SS	Shawon Dunston	114	419	119	.284	9	41
3B	Kevin Orie	114	364	100	.275	8	44
LF	Doug Glanville	146	474	142	.300	4	35
CF	Brian McRae	108	417	100	.240	6	28
RF	Sammy Sosa	162	642	161	.251	36	119

==== Other batters ====
Note: G = Games played; AB = At bats; H = Hits; Avg. = Batting average; HR = Home runs; RBI = Runs batted in

Player	G	AB	H	Avg.	HR	RBI
Rey Sánchez	97	205	51	.249	1	12
Tyler Houston	72	196	51	.260	2	28
José Hernández	121	183	50	.273	7	26
Dave Hansen	90	151	47	.311	3	21
Lance Johnson	39	145	44	.303	4	15
Dave Clark	102	143	43	.301	5	32
Brant Brown	46	137	32	.234	5	15
Manny Alexander	33	99	29	.293	1	7
Brooks Kieschnick	39	90	18	.200	4	12
Mike Hubbard	29	64	13	.203	1	2
Miguel Cairo	16	29	7	.241	0	1
Robin Jennings	9	18	3	.167	0	2
Terrell Lowery	9	14	4	.286	0	0

=== Pitching ===
==== Starting pitchers ====
Note: G = Games pitched; IP = Innings pitched; W = Wins; L = Losses; ERA = Earned run average; SO = Strikeouts

Player	G	IP	W	L	ERA	SO
Steve Trachsel	34	201.1	8	12	4.51	160
Terry Mulholland	25	157.0	6	12	4.07	74
Kevin Foster	26	146.1	10	7	4.61	118
Geremi González	23	144.0	11	9	4.25	93
Frank Castillo	20	98.0	6	9	5.42	67
Kevin Tapani	13	85.0	9	3	3.39	55
Mark Clark	9	63.0	6	1	2.86	51
Dave Swartzbaugh	2	8.0	0	1	9.00	4

==== Other pitchers ====
Note: G = Games pitched; IP = Innings pitched; W = Wins; L = Losses; ERA = Earned run average; SO = Strikeouts

Player	G	IP	W	L	ERA	SO
Amaury Telemaco	10	38.0	0	3	6.16	29
Miguel Batista	11	36.1	0	5	5.70	27
Rodney Myers	5	9.0	0	0	6.00	6

==== Relief pitchers ====
Note: G = Games pitched; W = Wins; L = Losses; SV = Saves; ERA = Earned run average; SO = Strikeouts

Player	G	W	L	SV	ERA	SO
Terry Adams	74	2	9	18	4.62	64
Bob Patterson	76	1	6	0	3.34	58
Kent Bottenfield	64	2	3	2	3.86	74
Ramón Tatís	56	1	1	0	5.34	33
Mel Rojas	54	0	4	3	4.42	61
Turk Wendell	52	3	5	4	4.20	54
Marc Pisciotta	24	3	1	0	3.18	21
Larry Casian	12	0	1	0	7.45	7
Dave Stevens	10	0	2	0	9.64	13
Ramón Morel	3	0	0	0	4.91	3

== Farm system ==
Level	Team	League	Manager
AAA	Iowa Cubs	American Association	Tim Johnson
AA	Orlando Rays	Southern League	Dave Trembley
A	Daytona Cubs	Florida State League	Steve Roadcap
A	Rockford Cubbies	Midwest League	Rubén Amaro, Sr.
A-Short Season	Williamsport Cubs	New York–Penn League	Bobby Ralston
Rookie	AZL Cubs	Arizona League	Terry Kennedy

LEAGUE CHAMPIONS: AZL Cubs
