= Jim Crowell =

American baseball player (born 1974)

- Pitcher
- Born: May 14, 1974 (age 51); Minneapolis, Minnesota, U.S.
- Batted: Left Threw: Left

MLB debut
- September 12, 1997, for the Cincinnati Reds

Last MLB appearance
- May 17, 2005, for the Florida Marlins

MLB statistics
- Win–loss record: 0–1
- Earned run average: 11.37
- Strikeouts: 6
- Stats at Baseball Reference

Teams
- Cincinnati Reds (1997); Philadelphia Phillies (2004); Florida Marlins (2005)

James Everette Crowell (born May 14, 1974) is an American former professional baseball pitcher, who has played in Major League Baseball (MLB) for the Cincinnati Reds (1997), Philadelphia Phillies (2004), and Florida Marlins (2005).

Crowell attended Valparaiso High School and the University of Indianapolis. He played in the Toronto Blue Jays organization in 2007. His son, Caden, currently is playing for Notre Dame.
