= José Silva (baseball) =

Mexican baseball player (born 1973)

- Pitcher
- Born: December 19, 1973 (age 52); Tijuana, Mexico
- Batted: Right Threw: Right

Professional debut
- MLB: September 10, 1996, for the Toronto Blue Jays
- CPBL: August 30, 2009, for the La New Bears

Last appearance
- MLB: September 28, 2002, for the Cincinnati Reds
- CPBL: September 20, 2009, for the La New Bears

MLB statistics
- Win–loss record: 25–28
- Earned run average: 5.41
- Strikeouts: 298

CPBL statistics
- Win–loss record: 1–2
- Earned run average: 1.80
- Strikeouts: 9
- Stats at Baseball Reference

Teams
- Toronto Blue Jays (1996); Pittsburgh Pirates (1997–2001); Cincinnati Reds (2002); La New Bears (2009)
Medals
Men's baseball
Representing Mexico
Pan American Games
Bronze medal – third place	2007 Rio de Janeiro	Team

José Leonel Silva (born December 19, 1973) is a Mexican former professional baseball pitcher. He played in Major League Baseball for the Toronto Blue Jays, Pittsburgh Pirates, and Cincinnati Reds, and in the Chinese Professional Baseball League (CPBL) for the La New Bears.

== Career ==
Silva was drafted out of Hilltop High School in Chula Vista, California. He last pitched in the affiliated minor leagues in 2006 for the Oklahoma RedHawks, and has been playing in the Mexican League since then.

Silva became a pitching coach in the San Diego area.
