= Jermaine Allensworth =

American baseball player (born 1972)

- Center fielder
- Born: January 11, 1972 (age 54); Anderson, Indiana, U.S.
- Batted: Right Threw: Right

MLB debut
- July 23, 1996, for the Pittsburgh Pirates

Last MLB appearance
- May 29, 1999, for the New York Mets

MLB statistics
- Batting average: .260
- Home runs: 15
- Runs batted in: 114
- Stats at Baseball Reference

Teams
- Pittsburgh Pirates (1996–1998); Kansas City Royals (1998); New York Mets (1998–1999)

Jermaine Lamont Allensworth (born January 11, 1972) is an American former professional baseball center fielder. He played four seasons in Major League Baseball (MLB), from 1996 until 1999, for the Pittsburgh Pirates, Kansas City Royals and the New York Mets.

== Career ==
Allensworth was the California Angels' 15th round selection and 422nd overall selection of the 1990 MLB draft, but did not sign with them. He instead played college baseball for the Purdue Boilermakers. Allensworth was talked into attending Purdue by Troy Lewis. In 1992, he played collegiate summer baseball with the Cotuit Kettleers of the Cape Cod Baseball League and was named a league all-star. He was a Big Ten Conference All-Star in 1993. He was drafted 34th overall by the Pittsburgh Pirates that year, with whom he signed.

He was an All-Star in the Pacific Coast League in 1996, leading to a promotion to the MLB, where he batted .262 in 61 games with the Pirates. He played two more seasons with the Pirates before being traded to the Kansas City Royals, then sent to the New York Mets, where he finished his career.

After his MLB career, Allensworth continued to play in the minor leagues. After being released by the Atlanta Braves following the 2002 season, he spent a year away from professional baseball. In 2004, he joined the independent Northern League, where he played for five seasons, most recently for the Schaumburg Flyers in 2008. In 2007, he led the Gary SouthShore RailCats to the League Championship.

Allensworth was portrayed by Tracy Morgan in a sketch on a 1997 episode of Saturday Night Live.
