= Abraham Núñez (infielder) =

Dominican baseball player (born 1976)

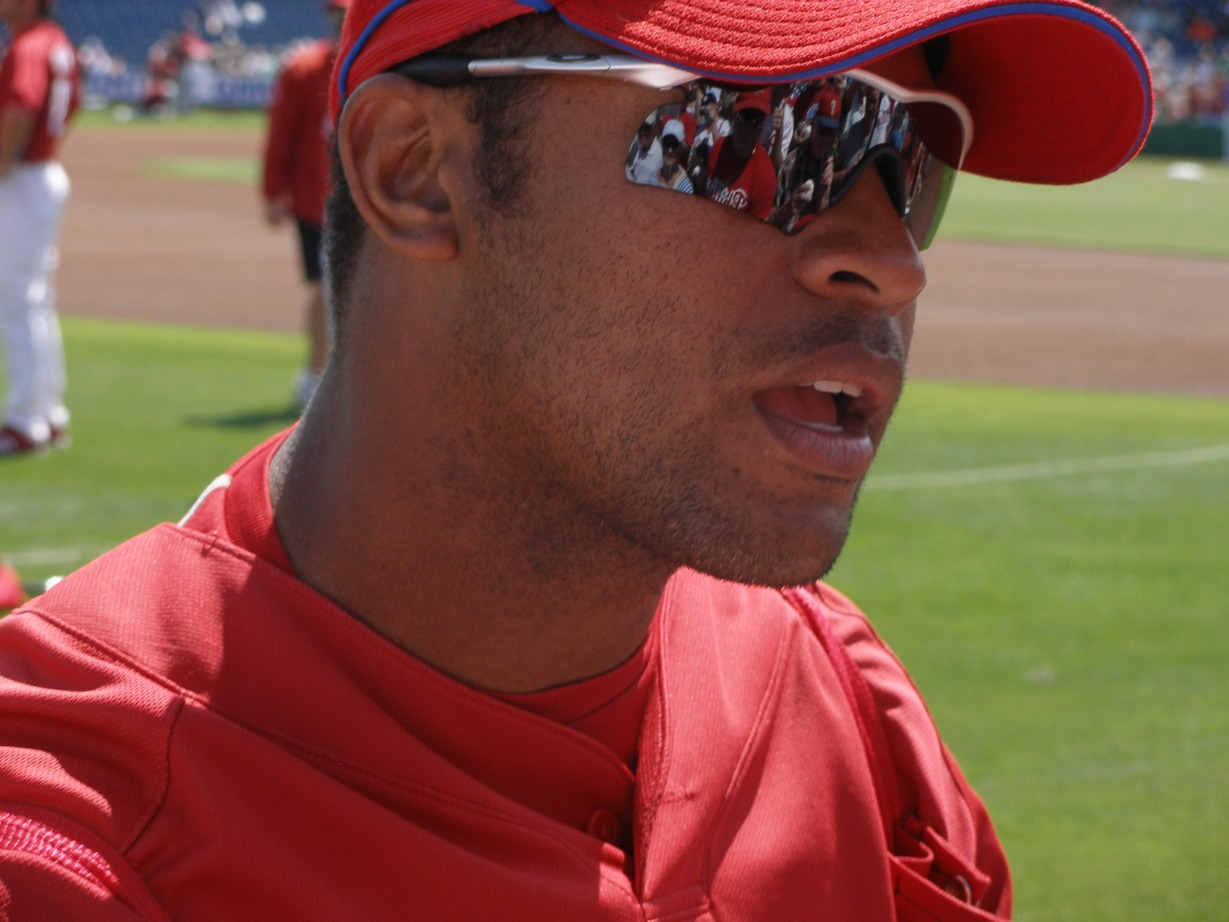
- Nunez with the Philadelphia Phillies
- Infielder
- Born: March 16, 1976 (age 49); Santo Domingo, Dominican Republic
- Batted: Switch Threw: Right

MLB debut
- August 27, 1997, for the Pittsburgh Pirates

Last MLB appearance
- June 8, 2008, for the New York Mets

MLB statistics
- Batting average: .242
- Home runs: 18
- Runs batted in: 209
- Stats at Baseball Reference

Teams
- Pittsburgh Pirates (1997–2004); St. Louis Cardinals (2005); Philadelphia Phillies (2006–2007); New York Mets (2008)

Abraham Orlando Núñez Adames [NOO-nyez] (born March 16, 1976) is a Dominican former professional baseball third baseman. He played in Major League Baseball (MLB) from 1997 to 2008 for the Pittsburgh Pirates, St. Louis Cardinals, Philadelphia Phillies, and New York Mets. Núñez primarily played third base, but was capable of playing all four infield positions.

== Career ==
He played 630 games with the Pittsburgh Pirates from 1997–2004. He joined the St. Louis Cardinals in 2005, and with a mid-season injury to third baseman Scott Rolen, Núñez saw his playing time increase, becoming the everyday starter at third base for the rest of the season and the playoffs. After the 2005 season, he signed with the Philadelphia Phillies as a free agent. While he was with the Phillies, Nunez was used in roles as a defensive replacement and as a starter when pitcher Jamie Moyer was on the mound. Nunez is known for his sharp fielding skills, and was apparently a better fielder than the Phillies Greg Dobbs and Wes Helms who, as a Philly sportswriter said, "fields with oven mitts".

=== Brewers and Bears ===
At the end of the 2007 season, Núñez was released by the Phillies. At the start of 2008, he signed a minor league contract with the Milwaukee Brewers, but was later released, and during May he signed on with the New York Mets. The Mets designated him for assignment on June 11 and he became a free agent at the end of the season.

On May 11, 2009, Nunez agreed to play for the Newark Bears of the Atlantic League. Later that month, the Arizona Diamondbacks signed him to a minor league contract.

=== The Jackals ===
On March 5, 2010, Nunez signed a contract to play for the New Jersey Jackals of the independent Canadian-American (Can-Am) League.

=== Coaching Résumé ===
Nunez began his coaching tenure within the Kansas City Royals organization in 2012 as the hitting coach for the DSL Royals of the Dominican Summer League. Since then he has served in the same capacity for the Rookie Level Burlington Royals (2013), Low-A Lexington Legends (2014), and Advanced-A Wilmington Blue Rocks (2015–19). As of 2022, Nunez is the hitting coach of the Royals' Double-A team, the Northwest Arkansas Naturals.

Nunez has also given his time in the off-season to serve as the bench coach for the Dominican Winter League Gigantes del Cibao; there he was part of the National Championship-winning team in 2015.
