= Jeff Wallace =

American baseball player (born 1976)

- Pitcher
- Born: April 12, 1976 (age 50); Wheeling, West Virginia, U.S.
- Batted: Left Threw: Left

MLB debut
- August 21, 1997, for the Pittsburgh Pirates

Last MLB appearance
- October 3, 2001, for the Tampa Bay Devil Rays

MLB statistics
- Win–loss record: 3–3
- Earned run average: 4.20
- Strikeouts: 120
- Stats at Baseball Reference

Teams
- Pittsburgh Pirates (1997, 1999–2000); Tampa Bay Devil Rays (2001)

Jeffrey Allen Wallace (born April 12, 1976) is an American former Major League Baseball pitcher. He was drafted by the Kansas City Royals in the 25th round of the 1995 amateur draft. Wallace played his first professional season with their Rookie League GCL Royals in 1995 He played during four seasons at the major league level for the Pittsburgh Pirates and Tampa Bay Devil Rays and split his last season between the Boston Red Sox's Class-A (Advanced) Sarasota Red Sox and Triple-A Pawtucket Red Sox, in 2002. He works at Leslie Equipment Company in West Virginia.
