= Joey Long =

American baseball player (born 1970)

- Pitcher
- Born: July 15, 1970 (age 54); Sidney, Ohio, U.S.
- Batted: Right Threw: Left

MLB debut
- April 25, 1997, for the San Diego Padres

Last MLB appearance
- May 24, 1997, for the San Diego Padres

MLB statistics
- Win–loss record: 0–0
- Earned run average: 8.18
- Strikeouts: 8
- Stats at Baseball Reference

Teams
- San Diego Padres (1997)

Joey J. Long (born July 15, 1970) is an American former professional baseball pitcher. He played during one season in Major League Baseball (MLB) for the San Diego Padres. He was drafted by the Padres in the 5th round of the 1991 Major League Baseball draft. Long played his first professional season with their Class A (Short Season) Spokane Indians in 1991, and his last with the Pittsburgh Pirates' Double-A Altoona Curve and Triple-A Nashville Sounds in 1999. He now lives in Ohio, near a small town called Rosewood. He also has a daughter.
