= Steve Falteisek =

American baseball player (born 1972)

- Pitcher
- Born: January 28, 1972 (age 54); Mineola, New York, U.S.
- Batted: Right Threw: Right

MLB debut
- July 22, 1997, for the Montreal Expos

Last MLB appearance
- May 23, 1999, for the Milwaukee Brewers

MLB statistics
- Win–loss record: 0–0
- Earned run average: 5.85
- Strikeouts: 7
- Stats at Baseball Reference

Teams
- Montreal Expos (1997); Milwaukee Brewers (1999)

Steven James Falteisek (born January 28, 1972) is an American former Major League Baseball pitcher. Falteisek was drafted in the tenth round of the 1992 Major League Baseball draft by the Montreal Expos. He would reach the Major League level with the team in 1997. In 1998, Falteisek signed as a free agent with the Milwaukee Brewers and would make his final Major League appearance during his time with the team. After the Brewers cut him in 1999, Falteisek signed with the Cleveland Indians organization in 2000. Later that same year, he was traded to the Florida Marlins organization for minor league player Victor Martinez.

Falteisek played at the collegiate level at the University of South Alabama.
