= 1997 Houston Astros season =

36th season in Major League Baseball for the Houston Astros

1997 Houston Astros
- National League Central champions
- League: National League
- Division: Central
- Ballpark: Astrodome
- City: Houston, Texas
- Record: 84–78 (.519)
- Divisional place: 1st
- Owners: Drayton McLane, Jr.
- General managers: Gerry Hunsicker
- Managers: Larry Dierker
- Television: KTXH–TV 20 (Bill Brown, Milo Hamilton, Jim Deshaies); Fox Sports Southwest (Bill Brown, Milo Hamilton, Jim Deshaies, Bill Worrell)
- Radio: KILT–AM 610 (Milo Hamilton, Vince Controneo); KXYZ–AM 1320 (Francisco Ernesto Ruiz, Alex Treviño)

The 1997 Houston Astros season was the 36th season for the Major League Baseball (MLB) franchise located in Houston, Texas, their 33rd as the Astros, 36th in the National League (NL), fourth in the NL Central division, and 33rd at The Astrodome. The Astros entered the season with an 82–80 record and second-place finish in the NL Central, 6 games behind the division-champion St. Louis Cardinals. In the NL Wild Card race, Houston placed third, 8 games behind the Los Angeles Dodgers.

The 1997 season was the first for former player-turned-broadcaster Larry Dierker as manager, the 13th in Astros' franchise history, succeeding Terry Collins. On April 1, pitcher Shane Reynolds made his second of five consecutive Opening Day starts for the Astros, who hosted the Atlanta Braves and won, 2–1. In the amateur draft, the Astros selected first baseman Lance Berkman in the first round, at 16th overall. On June 13, the Astros played their first interleague game in franchise history, an 8–1 defeat to the Minnesota Twins of the American League (AL).

First baseman Jeff Bagwell (second career selection), second baseman Craig Biggio (sixth), and pitcher Darryl Kile (second) each represented the Astros at the MLB All-Star Game, playing for the National League. Former second baseman Nellie Fox, who played for Houston during their days as the Colt .45s, was inducted into the Baseball Hall of Fame. With 42 home runs and 31 stolen bases, Bagwell became the first Houston Astro to join the 30–30 club and first regular first baseman in major league history.

The Astros finished in first place with an 84–78 record for their first division title as a member of the NL Central, their first division title since 1986. (Note: As members of the National League West division.) It was the fourth division title overall and fourth playoff appearance in franchise history.

In the National League Division Series (NLDS), Atlanta swept the best-of-5 playoff, ending the Astros' season. This was the first time in which they were swept in a playoff format.

Following the season, Bagwell (second) and Biggio (fourth) each received Silver Slugger Awards, while Biggio was also recognized with the Branch Rickey and Gold Glove Awards. (Note: Fourth Gold Glove Award.)

== Offseason ==
=== Summary ===
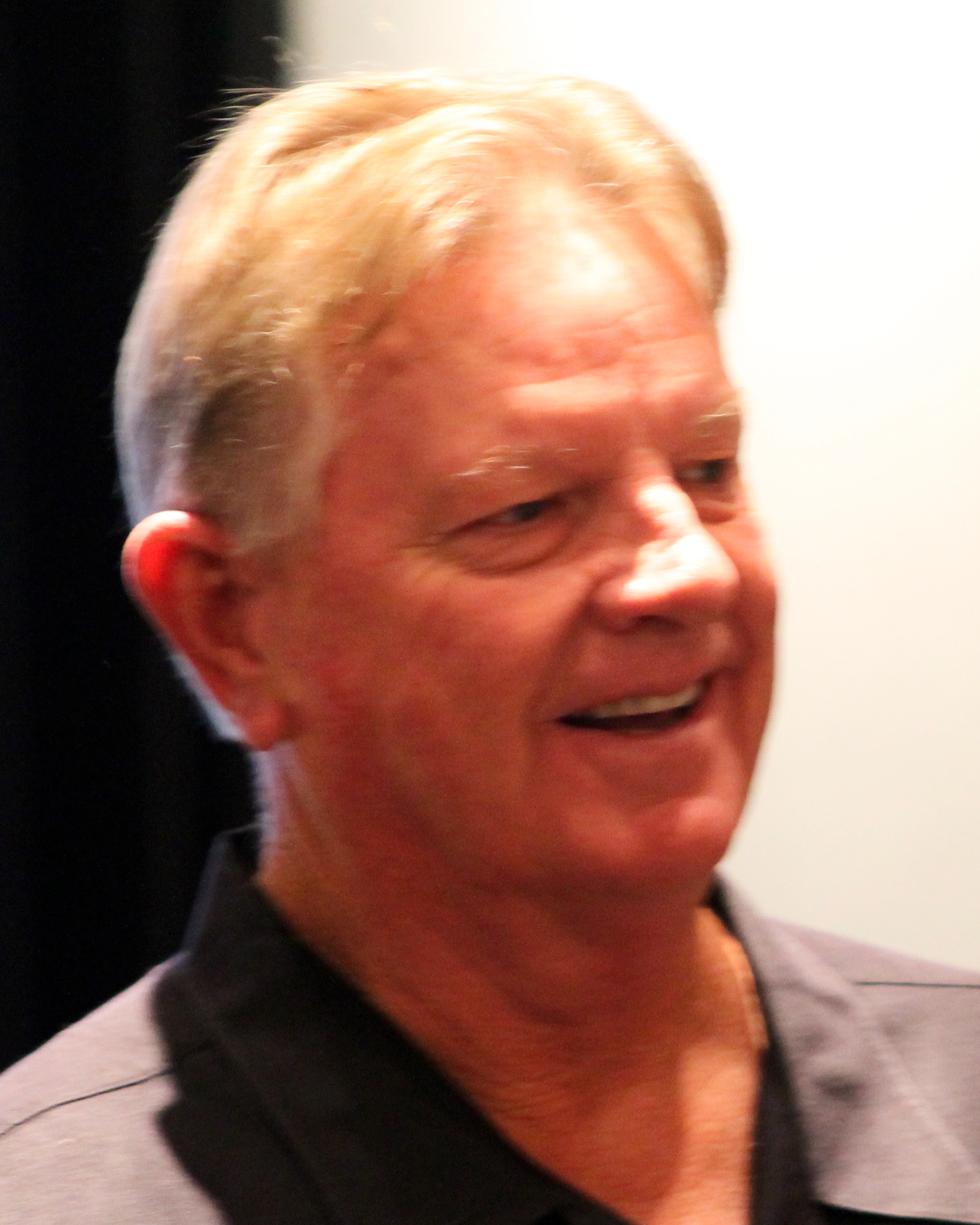
Larry Dierker, c. 2014, won the NL Central division title in his first year as manager.

The Astros concluded the 1996 campaign with a final record of 82–80 (.506), for a second-place ranking in the National League (NL) Central division, six games behind the division-champion St. Louis Cardinals. In the NL Wild Card race, Houston finished in third place and eight games behind the Los Angeles Dodgers. For the fifth straight campaign, since 1992, Houston concluded with a record of at least .500, adding to the franchise-best string. Also unprecedented during any period in franchise annals, the Astros stacked a fourth consecutive winning season, which surpassed the catenation by the 1979, 1980, and 1981-era clubs. The 1996 Astros also set then-club records for runs scored (753) and doubles (297).

The Astros hired former player-turned-broadcaster Larry Dierker as manager, the 13th in Astros' franchise history, to succeed Terry Collins, who had led the club to three consecutive second-place results in the NL Central division. Dierker pitched 13 seasons for Houston, from 1964–1976, gaining two All-Star selections. He pitched his final season as an active player with the St. Louis Cardinals in 1977. Dierker returned to Houston in 1979 as a broadcaster, serving in that capacity for the club through the 1996 campaign.

Two of Dieker's teammates during his playing career realized significant milestones in 1997. Former second baseman Nellie Fox, who played for Houston during their days as the Colt .45s (1964 to 1965), was elected into the Baseball Hall of Fame, while former outfielder José Cruz (1975 to 1987), joined the on-field staff as Houston's first base coach for his first major league coaching role.

=== Transactions ===
- December 2, 1996: Pat Listach signed as a free agent with the Houston Astros.

== Regular season ==
=== Summary ===
==== April ====
Opening Day starting lineup
Uniform	Player	Position
7	Craig Biggio	Second baseman
4	Pat Listach	Shortstop
5	Jeff Bagwell	First baseman
14	Derek Bell	Center fielder
26	Luis Gonzalez	Left fielder
17	Sean Berry	Third baseman
11	Brad Ausmus	Catcher
53	Bobby Abreu	Right fielder
37	Shane Reynolds	Pitcher
Venue: Astrodome • Final: Houston 2, Atlanta 1 Sources:

Larry Dierker made his managerial debut on Opening Day, April 1, sending right-hander Shane Reynolds to the mound opposite John Smoltz—the reigning NL Cy Young Award winner—of the Atlanta Braves, the defending NL pennant winners. In front of an attendance of 44,618, an Astrodome record on an Opening Day, Houston opened the scoring during the bottom of the first when Craig Biggio raced home on Jeff Bagwell's high chopper to third baseman Chipper Jones. Jones then tied the score in the top of the third by golfing a liner which cleared the center field fence for a home run. During the bottom of the third, Pat Listach swatted a sacrifice fly to score Brad Ausmus for a 2–1 Houston lead. Reynolds and Smoltz locked into a pitching duel to maintain the score. For his eighth and ultimate frame, Reynolds whiffed two of his last three batters, Jones and Ryan Klesko. Billy Wagner took over for Reynolds in the ninth, and ended the contest on consecutive strikeouts of Jeff Blauser and Mike Mordecai for the save to seal the Astros' 2–1 victory. Hence, Dierker won his managerial debut, while Reynolds was the winning pitcher.

On April 8, Russ Johnson made his major league debut, going 1-for-4 in a 4–2 defeat to Atlanta. Johnson followed up his debut by collecting a seven-game hitting streak, during which he batted .321. This feat set a franchise record by hitting safely in each of his first 7 major league appearances, and was later tied by Jose Altuve on July 27, 2011. Johnson went 0-for-4 with 4 strikeouts on April 19 to end the hitting streak. It was his final appearance in the major leagues until later August.

Bagwell was named NL Player of the Week for April 27. He batted .391 (nine hits in 23 at bats), .826 slugging percentage. with three home runs and nine RBI.

On April 28 at the Astrodome, Bobby Abreu belted his first two major league home runs, the second of which was a game-tying shot. Abreu went 3-for-4 with 4 RBI. In the bottom of the second, Astros starter Mike Hampton singled in Brad Ausmus to tie the contest, 1–1. Leading off the third, Abreu connected off Rockies starter Jamey Wright to right-center field for the first home run. In the bottom of the fourth, Abreu doubled in Ray Montgomery and Biggio. Leading the off the bottom of the seventh, Abreu connected for the second time, off Steve Reed, tying the score, 6–6. However, the Rockies nipped the Astros, 7–6, in extra innings. Vinny Castilla went 3-for-5, capping his evening with the game-winning home run to left-center field in the top of the tenth frame off Astros closer Billy Wagner (2–1). This was also the first 4-RBI bout of Abreu's career.

==== May ====
Craig Biggio greeted Philadelphia Phillies starter Mark Leiter with a leadoff home run on May 16 at Veterans Stadium for his 100th career home run, his tenth career leadoff home run, and first of two for the contest. The Astros scored four runs until Leiter was chased after just having recorded just one out by Brad Ausmus, who slugged his first home run as an Astro. In the top of the second inning, Houston did not relent, exploding for seven off left-hander Mike Mimbs, including Biggio's second home run with two outs. Biggio's effort spearheaded 12–7 drubbing of Philadelphia. The Astros coaxed 11 bases on balls as plate discipline savants Jeff Bagwell (4) and Bobby Abreu (3) led the way. Bagwell also added a home run in the ninth inning. This was the seventh multi-home game of Biggio's career, and third game with four or more RBI.

On May 20, Jeff Bagwell collected his 1,000th career hit on a home run (his first of two on the day) off Calvin Maduro in a 9–5 win over the Phillies.

Starting May 26, outfielder Luis Gonzalez authored a 23-game hitting streak, tying the franchise record established by Art Howe in 1981. Gonzalez batted .351, .413 on-base percentage (OBP), and .479 slugging percentage (SLG). The streak ended on June 20 in a 7–3 victory over the Chicago Cubs, though Gonzalez did reach base again by drawing a base on balls. He had two hits the following game, which extended an overlapping on-base streak to 27 games, his season high. The franchise record stood until the 2000 season, when Gonzalez' teammate Tony Eusebio hit in 24 straight.

==== First intterleague series ====
On June 13, Houston faced the Minnesota Twins of the American League (AL) the first regular-season interleague game in franchise history, losing 8–1.

On June 16, Sean Berry assumed the role as first designated hitter (DH) during the regular season in team history at Kauffman Stadium as the Kansas City Royals hosted the Astros for the team's first interleague road contest against an AL opponent. Hence, the first pitcher to play without a spot in the batting order for the Astros was Mike Hampton, who would later win five Silver Slugger Awards during his career. Batting seventh, Berry went 1-for-4; however, the Royals triumphed, 5–2. Hampton (2–6) was charged with the loss after surrendering three runs, eight hits and three walks over 6 1/3 innings pitched (IP).

==== MLB All-Star Game ====
- Home Run Derby: Jeff Bagwell—Round 1: 4 / Round 2: 1 / Total: 5 (4th place) • Winner: Tino Martinez (NYY)—Total:16

Bagwell, at first base, second baseman Craig Biggio, and pitcher Darryl Kile were selected to represent the Astros at the MLB All-Star Game, and played for the National League. With Bagwell and Biggio elected to the starting lineup, this represented the first time that fans had elected two Astros position players to the Midsummer Classic starting lineup. Bagwell became the first starter as his position to represent Houston since Lee May at the 1972 game.

==== July ====
Just one game back of first-place Houston on July 12, the Pittsburgh Pirates sold out Three Rivers Stadium for the first time on a date that was not a home opener. The Pirates did not disappoint their fans, with starter Francisco Córdova tossing nine dominant no-hit innings. However, when he retired the Astros to end the top half of the ninth inning, no celebration ensued. The Astros' Chris Holt and Billy Wagner had matched Córdova's shutout effort, also keeping the Pirates scoreless through nine. In the top of the tenth, Ricardo Rincón relieved Córdova, who had thrown 121 pitches, and retired the Astros in order. After John Hudek assumed the bottom of the tenth inning for Houston, he issued two bases on balls prior to serving an offering to Mark Smith that Smith converted into a three-run, walk-off home run to win it for Pittsburgh, 3–0. This became the first combined, extra-innings no-hitter in Major League history. Córdova tied a major league record achieved just once—eight decades earlier—for most innings by one pitcher in a combined no-hitter, by Ernie Shore, on June 23, 1917. (Note: In a unique sequence of events, Shore relieved starting pitcher Babe Ruth after just one batter faced. Ruth issued a base on balls to the leadoff hitter, Ray Morgan, prior to being ejected for arguing balls and strikes. After relieving Ruth, Morgan was erased on a caught stealing, and Shore recorded all remaining 26 outs without surrendering a hit for the Boston Red Sox, who defeated the Washington Senators, 4–0 (nine total innings). Because Ruth had started the outing, Shore could not receive credit for a complete game. However, Shore was credited with a shutout.)

During the month of July, right-hander Darryl Kile won all six of his starts to go with a 1.59 earned run average (ERA), three complete games, and two shutouts. Over 51 innings pitched, Kile surrendered 36 hits, two home runs, 11 walks and struck out 46, with a 0.922 walks plus hits per inning pitched (WHIP). For the second time in his career (June 1993), Kile was selected as NL Pitcher of the Month. (Note: The most recent Astro to win Pitcher of the Month Award was Doug Drabek in May 1994.)

==== August—September ====
Russ Johnson made his first major league appearance in four month on August 26, which was a 7–6 loss to Atlanta. This time, he had two hits in five at bats and two RBI, to collect hits in 8 of his first 9 games.

Led by a four-hitter from southpaw Mike Hampton on September 25, the Astros clinched their first NL Central division title, eleven years to the day that Mike Scott spun a no-hitter to clinch Astros' most recent title as members of the NL West. Hampton led the Astros to 9–1 triumph of over the Chicago Cubs. Much of the contest proceeded as a pitchers' duel between Hampton and Geremi González. Biggio doubled in Ricky Gutiérrez during the bottom of the third. The Cubs attained their lone tally during the top of the seventh when José Hernández tripled, and Mike Hubbard singled home Hernández. In the bottom of the seventh Brad Ausmus, blasted a three-run homer to increase the Astros' lead to 5–1, and after González was relieved the Astros scored thrice more in the frame. With this masterpiece, Hampton's record stood at 15–10, a remarkable turnaround since having sported a 2–6 mark through mid-June. (Note: Hampton's challenging start to the campaign was rooted in part, on advice from Dierker, that he convert his style as a power pitcher to a sinkerball pitcher.)

In his 33rd campaign with Houston—including 13 as a pitcher and 18 as a broadcaster—Larry Dierker became the sixth manager to win a division title in his first year at the position. It was also Dierker's first division title as on-field personnel, as the club did not win their first until following his retirement as a pitcher. Meanwhile, in his tenth major league season, Biggio was also on course for the playoffs for the first time.

==== Performance overview ====
Having scored 777 runs and yielded 660, the club underperformed their Pythagorean expectation of 93–69 (.574).

Jeff Bagwell recorded the second of a Major League-record six successive campaigns of each of 100 runs scored, 30 doubles, 30 home runs, 100 runs batted in (RBI) and 100 base on balls (BB), through 2001. (Note: Just four other players had produced six or more total seasons meeting each of the criteria: Lou Gehrig (8); and Babe Ruth, Ted Williams, and Barry Bonds (6 each). Filtered for: Number of seasons player meets criteria, in the regular season: Requiring runs ≥ 100, doubles ≥ 30, home runs ≥ 30, runs batted in ≥ 100 and bases on balls ≥ 100, sorted by descending instances.) By finishing with 43 home runs and 31 stolen bases, Bagwell became the first player in club history to join the 30 home runs—30 stolen bases club. Further, he established club records for home runs, RBI (135), total bases (335), and extra-base hits (85).

Craig Biggio amassed a then-club record 146 runs scored, (Note: Surpassed by Bagwell in 2000.) while leading baseball, for the highest mark in the Major Leagues since Ted Williams (American League) (AL) in 1950, and most by a National Leaguer since Chuck Klein in 1932. Moreover, Biggio became the first player in major league history to play 162 games in a season without having grounded into a double play. Of those who accrued sufficient plate appearances to qualify for the batting title, Biggio's was the seventh in the major leagues to avoid a double play since 1939.

Right-hander Darryl Kile became the third Astros hurler to register each of at least 19 victories, 200 strikeouts, and a sub-3.00 earned run average (ERA) during the same season (Dierker, 1969; and J. R. Richard, 1976). (Note: For single seasons, playing for HOU, in the regular season, requiring wins ≥ 19 and earned run average ≤ 3 and strikeouts ≥ 200, sorted by ascending season.)

Southpaw reliever Billy Wagner whiffed 106 batters over 66 1/3 innings pitched, resulting in a major league-record pace of 14.4 strikeouts per nine innings (K/9), to displace the prior record of 14.1 effected by Rob Dibble of the Cincinnati Reds in 1992.

Biggio was recognized with both the Silver Slugger and Gold Glove Awards at second base for the third time, extending his club record of receiving both awards in the same campaigns. Having won the Silver Slugger at catcher in 1989, Biggio added to his record for total Silver Sluggers won in club history, with four. The Gold Glove was Biggio's fourth straight. Among Astros Gold Glove winners, only César Cedeño and Doug Rader had won more (5 each). Biggio was also accorded the Branch Rickey Award as well as media postseason All-Star honors by the Associated Press (AP) and The Sporting News.

Bagwell was also awarded the Silver Slugger for his offensive campaign, distinguishing him as the club leader at first base. His second win, Bagwell was first recognized during the 1994 campaign, when had joined Glenn Davis in 1986 as the only Astros to win the Silver Slugger at first base.

=== League standings ===
==== National League Central ====
NL Central
Team	W	L	Pct.	GB	Home	Road
Houston Astros	84	78	.519	—	46‍–‍35	38‍–‍43
Pittsburgh Pirates	79	83	.488	5	43‍–‍38	36‍–‍45
Cincinnati Reds	76	86	.469	8	40‍–‍41	36‍–‍45
St. Louis Cardinals	73	89	.451	11	41‍–‍40	32‍–‍49
Chicago Cubs	68	94	.420	16	42‍–‍39	26‍–‍55

==== Record versus opponents ====
National League

1997 National League record Source: MLB Standings Grid – 1997
Team	ATL	CHC	CIN	COL	FLA	HOU	LAD	MON	NYM	PHI	PIT	SD	SF	STL	AL
Atlanta	—	9–2	9–2	5–6	4–8	7–4	6–5	10–2	5–7	10–2	5–6	8–3	7–4	8–3	8–7
Chicago	2–9	—	7–5	2–9	2–9	3–9	5–6	4–7	6–5	6–5	7–5	6–5	5–6	4–8	9–6
Cincinnati	2–9	5–7	—	5–6	5–6	5–7	6–5	6–5	2–9	8–3	8–4	5–6	4–7	6–6	9–6
Colorado	6–5	9–2	6–5	—	7–4	5–6	5–7	7–4	6–5	4–7	4–7	4–8	4–8	7–4	9–7
Florida	8–4	9–2	6–5	4–7	—	7–4	7–4	7–5	4–8	6–6	7–4	5–6	5–6	5–6	12–3
Houston	4–7	9–3	7–5	6–5	4–7	—	7–4	8–3	7–4	4–7	6–6	6–5	3–8	9–3	4–11
Los Angeles	5–6	6–5	5–6	7–5	4–7	4–7	—	7–4	6–5	10–1	9–2	5–7	6–6	5–6	9–7
Montreal	2–10	7–4	5–6	4–7	5–7	3–8	4–7	—	5–7	6–6	5–6	8–3	6–5	6–5	12–3
New York	7–5	5–6	9–2	5–6	8–4	4–7	5–6	7–5	—	7–5	7–4	5–6	3–8	9–2	7–8
Philadelphia	2–10	5–6	3–8	7–4	6–6	7–4	1–10	6–6	5–7	—	5–6	7–4	3–8	6–5	5–10
Pittsburgh	6–5	5–7	4–8	7–4	4–7	6–6	2–9	6–5	4–7	6–5	—	5–6	8–3	9–3	7–8
San Diego	3–8	5–6	6–5	8–4	6–5	5–6	7–5	3–8	6–5	4–7	6–5	—	4–8	5–6	8–8
San Francisco	4–7	6–5	7–4	8–4	6–5	8–3	6–6	5–6	8–3	8–3	3–8	8–4	—	3–8	10–6
St. Louis	3–8	8–4	6–6	4–7	6–5	3–9	6–5	5–6	2–9	5–6	3–9	6–5	8–3	—	8–7

=== Notable transactions ===
- June 3, 1997: 1997 Major League Baseball draft
  - Lance Berkman was drafted by the Astros in the 1st round (16th pick). Player signed June 4, 1997.
  - Eric Byrnes was drafted by the Astros in the 4th round, but did not sign.
- July 1, 1997: Pat Listach was released by the Astros.
- July 27, 1997: Josías Manzanillo was signed as a free agent with the Houston Astros.

=== Roster ===
1997 Houston Astros
Roster
Pitchers: 55 Manuel Barrios; 51 José Cabrera; 50 Sid Fernandez; 59 Ramón García; 54 Tommy Greene; 10 Mike Hampton; 54 Oscar Henríquez; 45 Chris Holt; 35 John Hudek; 57 Darryl Kile; 42 José Lima; 52 Mike Magnante; 41 Tom Martin; 43 Blas Minor; 37 Shane Reynolds; 31 Russ Springer; 13 Billy Wagner; 56 Donne Wall	Catchers: 11 Brad Ausmus; 20 Tony Eusebio; 9 Randy Knorr; 4 Tony Peña; Infielders: 5 Jeff Bagwell; 17 Sean Berry; 7 Craig Biggio; 27 Tim Bogar; 12 Ricky Gutiérrez; 19 Russ Johnson; 4 Pat Listach; 2 Luis Rivera; 28 Bill Spiers	Outfielders: 53 Bobby Abreu; 14 Derek Bell; 21 Chuck Carr; 26 Luis Gonzalez; 52 Richard Hidalgo; 22 Thomas Howard; 39 Ray Montgomery; 6 James Mouton; 29 J. R. Phillips; 29 Ken Ramos	Manager: 49 Larry Dierker; Coaches: 8 Alan Ashby (bullpen); 25 José Cruz (first base); 16 Tom McCraw (hitting); 48 Vern Ruhle (pitching); 18 Bill Virdon (bench); 24 Mike Cubbage (third base)

== Game log ==
=== Regular season ===
Legend
	Astros win
	Astros loss
	Postponement
	Clinched division
**Bold**	Astros team member

1997 regular season game log: 84–78 (Home: 46–35; Away: 38–43)
April: 15–11 (Home: 8–5; Away: 7–6)

#	Date	Time (CT)	Opponent	Score	Win	Loss	Save	Time of Game	Attendance	Record	Box/ Streak
1	April 1	7:06 p.m. CDT	Braves	**W** 2–1	**Reynolds** (1–0)	Smoltz (0–1)	**Wagner** (1)	2:29	44,618	1–0	W1
2	April 2	7:06 p.m. CDT	Braves	**W** 4–3	**Hampton** (1–0)	Maddux (0–1)	**Wagner** (2)	2:34	16,308	2–0	W2
3	April 3	7:06 p.m. CDT	Braves	L 2–3	Glavine (1–0)	**Kile** (0–1)	Wohlers (1)	2:38	17,693	2–1	L1
4	April 4	7:06 p.m. CDT	Cardinals	**W** 3–2 (11)	**Springer** (1–0)	Ludwick (0–1)	–	3:56	25,985	3–1	W1
5	April 5	7:07 p.m. CDT	Cardinals	**W** 6–2	**Fernandez** (1–0)	Osborne (0–1)	**García** (1)	2:54	25,957	4–1	W2
6	April 6	1:35 p.m. CDT	Cardinals	**W** 3–2	**Martin** (1–0)	Frascatore (0–1)	**Wagner** (3)	2:44	18,752	5–1	W3
7	April 8	6:40 p.m. CDT	@ Braves	L 2–4	Glavine (2–0)	**Hampton** (1–1)	Wohlers (3)	2:48	31,064	5–2	L1
8	April 9	6:40 p.m. CDT	@ Braves	L 3–4 (12)	Embree (1–0)	**Lima** (0–1)	–	3:48	33,986	5–3	L2
9	April 10	6:35 p.m. CDT	@ Braves	**W** 5–3	**Holt** (1–0)	Smoltz (1–2)	**Hudek** (1)	2:58	33,637	6–3	W1
10	April 11	7:06 p.m. CDT	@ Cardinals	L 2–4	Batchelor (1–1)	**Reynolds** (1–1)	Eckersley (1)	2:41	23,744	6–4	L1
11	April 12	1:17 p.m. CDT	@ Cardinals	**W** 7–5	**García** (1–0)	Stottlemyre (0–1)	**Wagner** (4)	3:15	28,235	7–4	W1
12	April 13	7:07 p.m. CDT	@ Cardinals	L 2–6	Benes (1–1)	**Hampton** (1–2)	Eckersley (2)	2:38	22,705	7–5	L1
13	April 14	1:35 p.m. CDT	@ Cardinals	**W** 4–2 (10)	**Wagner** (1–0)	Eckersley (0–1)	**Hudek** (2)	3:11	22,623	8–5	W1
14	April 15	7:08 p.m. CDT	Expos	L 5–7	Martínez (1–0)	**Holt** (1–1)	–	2:30	18,602	8–6	L1
15	April 16	7:05 p.m. CDT	Expos	**W** 10–2	**Reynolds** (2–1)	Valdes (0–2)	–	3:01	14,046	9–6	W1
16	April 18	9:05 p.m. CDT	@ Dodgers	L 3–5	Martínez (2–1)	**Hampton** (1–3)	Worrell (5)	3:25	38,937	9–7	L1
17	April 19	9:05 p.m. CDT	@ Dodgers	**W** 2–1	**Kile** (1–1)	Nomo (2–1)	**Wagner** (5)	3:07	46,244	10–7	W1
18	April 20	3:07 p.m. CDT	@ Dodgers	**W** 3–1	**Holt** (2–1)	Candiotti (2–1)	**Hudek** (3)	2:21	33,250	11–7	W2
19	April 22	9:06 p.m. CDT	@ Padres	**W** 12–3	**Reynolds** (3–1)	Valenzuela (1–2)	–	3:15	16,748	12–7	W3
20	April 23	9:36 p.m. CDT	@ Padres	**W** 11–7	**García** (2–0)	Worrell (1–3)	–	3:09	15,534	13–7	W34
21	April 25	7:05 p.m. CDT	Giants	**W** 5–4	**Wagner** (2–0)	Roa (1–1)	–	2:37	26,705	14–7	W5
22	April 26	7:05 p.m. CDT	Giants	L 0–2	Estes (4–0)	**Holt** (2–2)	–	2:17	36,837	14–8	L1
23	April 27	1:35 p.m. CDT	Giants	L 2–3	Fernández (3–1)	**Reynolds** (3–2)	Beck (11)	2:33	22,316	14–9	L2
24	April 28	7:05 p.m. CDT	Rockies	L 6–7 (10)	McCurry (1–0)	**Wagner** (2–1)	Ruffin (6)	3:35	13,510	14–10	L3
25	April 29	12:35 p.m. CDT	Rockies	**W** 3–1	**Wall** (1–0)	Bailey (3–1)	**Hudek** (4)	2:16	13,567	15–10	W1
26	April 30	6:39 p.m. CDT	@ Expos	L 6–8	Pérez (4–1)	**Kile** (1–2)	Urbina (2)	3:01	12,346	15–11	L1

May: 11–17 (Home: 6–6; Away: 5–11)

#	Date	Time (CT)	Opponent	Score	Win	Loss	Save	Time of Game	Attendance	Record	Box/ Streak
27	May 1	12:39 p.m. CDT	@ Expos	L 0–4	Martínez (4–0)	**Holt** (2–3)	–	2:11	12,328	15–12	L2
28	May 2	7:05 p.m. CDT	Marlins	**W** 2–1	**Reynolds** (4–2)	Rapp (2–2)	**Wagner** (6)	2:32	25,421	16–12	W1
29	May 3	7:05 p.m. CDT	Marlins	L 8–9 (13)	Heredia (2–0)	**García** (2–1)	Powell (1)	4:54	24,539	16–13	L1
30	May 4	7:06 p.m. CDT	Marlins	**W** 1–0	**Kile** (2–2)	Brown (3–2)	—	2:25	16,469	17–13	W1
31	May 5	7:05 p.m. CDT	Phillies	**W** 9–2	**Holt** (3–3)	Leiter (3–3)	–	2:33	11,268	18–13	W2
32	May 6	7:07 p.m. CDT	Phillies	L 1–5	Schilling (4–3)	**García** (2–2)	–	3:05	12,179	18–14	L1
33	May 7	7:05 p.m. CDT	Mets	L 1–4	Reynoso (2–0)	**Martin** (1–1)	Franco (8)	2:55	12,574	18–15	L2
34	May 8	12:35 p.m. CDT	Mets	**W** 4–2	**Hampton** (2–3)	Reed (3–2)	**Wagner** (7)	2:28	12,842	19–15	W1
35	May 9	6:05 p.m. CDT	@ Marlins	L 2–3	Nen (2–1)	**Lima** (0–2)	—	3:04	30,525	19–16	L1
36	May 10	6:06 p.m. CDT	@ Marlins	**W** 4–2	**Holt** (4–3)	Helling (1–2)	**Wagner** (8)	3:04	42,132	20–16	W1
37	May 11	12:38 p.m. CDT	@ Marlins	L 3–6	Fernandez (4–4)	**Wall** (1–1)	Nen (9)	3:06	30,030	20–17	L1
38	May 12	6:06 p.m. CDT	@ Marlins	L 4–11	Stanifer (1–0)	**Reynolds** (4–3)	—	2:51	15,342	20–18	L2
39	May 13	5:40 p.m. CDT	@ Mets	L 3–4	McMichael (3–2)	**Springer** (1–1)	Franco (11)	2:28	13,997	20–19	L3
40	May 14	6:42 p.m. CDT	@ Mets	**W** 1–0	**Kile** (3–2)	McMichael (3–3)	**Wagner** (9)	2:28	13,051	21–19	W1
41	May 16	6:05 p.m. CDT	@ Phillies	**W** 12–7	**Holt** (5–3)	Leiter (3–4)	–	3:09	13,456	22–19	W2
42	May 17	6:05 p.m. CDT	@ Phillies	L 2–4	Schilling (6–3)	**Reynolds** (4–4)	Bottalico (9)	2:27	17,138	22–20	L1
43	May 18	12:35 p.m. CDT	@ Phillies	L 3–5	Stephenson (1–0)	**Hampton** (2–4)	Bottalico (10)	2:29	17,367	22–21	L2
44	May 19	6:07 p.m. CDT	@ Phillies	**W** 9–5	**Kile** (4–2)	Maduro (3–5)	–	3:01	15,122	23–21	W1
45	May 20	7:06 p.m. CDT	Reds	L 4–7	Smiley (4–6)	**Springer** (1–2)	Shaw (5)	2:51	14,954	23–22	L1
46	May 21	7:05 p.m. CDT	Reds	**W** 4–3 (14)	**Martin** (2–1)	Sullivan (0–1)	–	4:22	15,088	24–22	W1
47	May 23	8:05 p.m. CDT	@ Rockies	L 7–8	Jones (1–0)	**Wall** (1–2)	Reed (4)	2:42	48,127	24–23	L1
48	May 24	2:35 p.m. CDT	@ Rockies	**W** 7–0	**Kile** (5–2)	Burke (0–1)	–	2:48	48,129	25–23	W1
49	May 25	2:05 p.m. CDT	@ Rockies	L 5–8	Bailey (5–4)	**García** (2–3)	Munoz (1)	2:55	48,222	25–24	L1
50	May 26	3:06 p.m. CDT	@ Giants	L 3–4	Tavárez (1–2)	**Lima** (0–3)	–	3:09	16,059	25–25	L2
51	May 27	2:36 p.m. CDT	@ Giants	L 4–5 (10)	Beck (3–2)	**Wagner** (2–2)	–	3:18	8,437	25–26	L3
52	May 29	7:05 p.m. CDT	Padres	**W** 10–6	**Kile** (6–2)	Valenzuela (2–7)	–	3:23	13,793	26–26	W1
53	May 30	7:06 p.m. CDT	Padres	L 2–9	Cunnane (3–1)	**Holt** (5–4)	Worrell (1)	2:43	31,339	26–27	L1
54	May 31	7:05 p.m. CDT	Padres	L 5–12	Hitchcock (5–5)	**Reynolds** (4–5)	Smith (1)	2:58	39,286	26–28	L2

June: 14–14 (Home: 7–6; Away: 7–8)

#	Date	Time (CT)	Opponent	Score	Win	Loss	Save	Time of Game	Attendance	Record	Box/ Streak
55	June 1	1:36 p.m. CDT	Padres	L 3–6	Hamilton (4–2)	**Wagner** (2–3)	Hoffman (8)	2:57	19,899	26–29	L3
56	June 2	7:05 p.m. CDT	Dodgers	**W** 2–0	**Wall** (2–2)	Nomo (5–5)	**Lima** (1)	2:28	16,227	27–29	W1
57	June 3	12:35 p.m. CDT	Dodgers	**W** 4–3	**Magnante** (1–0)	Radinsky (2–1)	–	3:16	17,268	28–29	W2
58	June 4	6:35 p.m. CDT	@ Reds	**W** 5–2	**Holt** (6–4)	Burba (4–5)	**Wagner** (10)	2:29	18,849	29–29	W3
59	June 5	11:35 a.m. CDT	@ Reds	L 5–6	Schourek (5–4)	**Reynolds** (4–6)	Shaw (9)	2:53	22,437	29–30	L1
60	June 6	9:05 p.m. CDT	@ Padres	**W** 8–7	**Lima** (1–3)	Hamilton (4–3)	**Wagner** (11)	3:27	21,700	30–30	W1
61	June 7	9:06 p.m. CDT	@ Padres	L 4–5 (10)	Hoffman (3–3)	**García** (2–4)	–	3:24	34,763	30–31	L1
62	June 8	3:06 p.m. CDT	@ Padres	**W** 9–0	**Kile** (7–2)	Valenzuela (2–8)	–	2:40	28,939	30–32	L2
63	June 9	9:05 p.m. CDT	@ Dodgers	L 3–8	Martínez (6–3)	**Holt** (6–5)	–	2:54	25,585	31–32	L1
64	June 10	9:05 p.m. CDT	@ Dodgers	**W** 6–3	**Magnante** (2–0)	Osuna )1–2)	**Wagner** (12)	3:16	26,491	32–32	W1
65	June 11	9:35 p.m. CDT	@ Dodgers	L 5–10	Park (5–3)	**Hampton** (2–5)	–	3:09	52,873	32–33	L1
66	June 13	7:05 p.m. CDT	Twins	L 1–8	Radke (6–5)	**Wall** (2–3)	–	2:40	30,956	32–34	L2
67	June 14	7:05 p.m. CDT	Twins	L 1–6	Robertson (7–3)	**Kile** (7–3)	–	2:44	27,172	32–35	L3
68	June 15	1:35 p.m. CDT	Twins	**W** 3–2	**Wagner** (3–3)	Guardado (0–2)	–	2:35	28,218	33–35	W1
69	June 16	7:06 p.m. CDT	@ Royals	L 2–5	Rosado (7–3)	**Hampton** (2–6)	–	2:47	22,528	33–36	L1
70	June 17	7:05 p.m. CDT	@ Royals	**W** 10–2	**García** (3–4)	Haney (0–2)	–	2:46	20,588	34–36	W1
71	June 18	7:05 p.m. CDT	@ Royals	L 2–6	Pittsley (2–4)	**Wall** (2–4)	–	2:30	20,085	34–37	L1
72	June 20	7:05 p.m. CDT	Cubs	**W** 7–3	**Kile** (8–3)	Trachsel (4–6)	–	2:49	30,085	35–37	W1
73	June 21	12:15 p.m. CDT	Cubs	**W** 7–3	**Holt** (7–5)	Castillo (4–9)	–	2:52	25,227	36–37	W2
74	June 22	1:36 p.m. CDT	Cubs	**W** 3–1	**Hampton** (3–6)	Foster (8–5)	**Wagner** (13)	2:15	23,407	37–37	W3
75	June 23	7:05 p.m. CDT	Pirates	L 0–6	Córdova (6–5)	**García** (3–5)	–	2:24	16,738	37–38	L1
76	June 24	7:05 p.m. CDT	Pirates	L 3–8	Lieber (4–8)	**Wall** (2–5)	–	2:44	17,972	37–39	L2
77	June 25	12:36 p.m. CDT	Pirates	**W** 5–1	**Kile** (9–3)	Sodowsky (0–1)	–	2:30	26,954	38–39	W1
78	June 26	7:06 p.m. CDT	@ Cubs	**W** 7–6 (10)	**Wagner** (4–3)	Adams (1–4)	**Minor** (1)	3:52	30,473	39–39	W2
79	June 27	2:23 p.m. CDT	@ Cubs	L 1–2	Foster (9–5)	**Hampton** (3–7)	Wendell (4)	2:54	28,265	39–40	L1
80	June 28	12:09 p.m. CDT	@ Cubs	L 2–5	González (4–2)	**García** (3–6)	Bottenfield (1)	2:58	38,244	39–41	L2
81	June 29	1:22 p.m. CDT	@ Cubs	**W** 10–8	**Minor** (1–0)	Mulholland (5–9)	**Wagner** (14)	3:34	30,542	40–41	W1
82	June 30	7:05 p.m. CDT	Indians	L 4–6	Mesa (1–4)	**Martin** (2–2)	Jackson (9)	3:07	29,051	40–42	L1

July: 19–7 (Home: 10–5; Away: 9–2)

#	Date	Time (CT)	Opponent	Score	Win	Loss	Save	Time of Game	Attendance	Record	Box/ Streak
83	July 1	7:04 p.m. CDT	Indians	L 6–8	Plunk (3–2)	**Lima** (1–4)	Jackson (10)	3:05	23,998	40–43	L2
84	July 2	7:05 p.m. CDT	Indians	**W** 6–2	**Hampton** (4–7)	Hershiser (7–5)	—	2:33	25,661	41–43	W1
85	July 3	7:06 p.m. CDT	Reds	L 3–4	Smiley (6–10)	**García** (3–7)	Shaw (17)	2:33	14,708	41–44	L1
86	July 4	6:05 p.m. CDT	Reds	L 2–4	Morgan (3–5)	**Greene** (0–1)	Shaw (18)	2:43	34,808	41–45	L2
87	July 5	7:05 p.m. CDT	Reds	**W** 2–1	**Kile** (10–3)	Mercker (6–6)	**Wagner** (15)	2:26	24,022	42–45	W1
88	July 6	1:37 p.m. CDT	Reds	**W** 6–5	**Wagner** (5–3)	Remlinger (3–4)	–	2:43	25,564	43–45	W2
—	July 8	7:15 p.m. CDT	**68th All-Star Game in Cleveland, OH**								
89	July 10	6:35 p.m. CDT	@ Pirates	**W** 7–0	**Kile** (11–3)	Schmidt (4–5)	–	2:39	17,335	44–45	W3
90	July 11	6:35 p.m. CDT	@ Pirates	**W** 10–0	**Hampton** (5–7)	Loaiza (6–6)	–	2:37	21,913	45–45	W4
91	July 12	6:40 p.m. CDT	@ Pirates	L 0–3 (10)	Rincón (3–4)	**Hudek** (0–1)	–	2:39	44,119	45–46	L1
92	July 13	12:35 p.m. CDT	@ Pirates	L 3–5	Sodowsky (1–1)	**Springer** (1–3)	Loiselle (11)	3:03	25,675	45–47	L2
93	July 14	7:05 p.m. CDT	@ Cubs	**W** 9–7 (15)	**Wagner** (6–3)	Tatís (0–1)	**Springer** (1)	5:19	27,803	46–47	W1
94	July 15	1:23 p.m. CDT	@ Cubs	**W** 5–3	**Kile** (12–3)	Rojas (0–3)	**Magnante** (1)	2:42	19,323	47–47	W2
95	July 16	7:07 p.m. CDT	Giants	**W** 8–1	**Hampton** (6–7)	Foulke (1–4)	–	2:45	24,522	48–47	W3
96	July 17	12:35 p.m. CDT	Giants	L 1–3	Gardner (10–4)	**Holt** (7–6)	Beck (30)	2:33	29,955	48–48	L1
97	July 18	6:40 p.m. CDT	@ Expos	**W** 2–0	**García** (4–7)	Martínez (11–5)	**Wagner** (16)	2:52	19,379	49–48	W1
98	July 19	6:37 p.m. CDT	@ Expos	**W** 8–6	**Reynolds** (5–6)	Juden (11–3)	**Wagner** (17)	3:13	34,518	50–48	W2
99	July 20	1:10 p.m. CDT	@ Expos	**W** 9–0	**Kile** (13–3)	Hermanson (4–5)	–	2:14	26,873	51–48	W3
100	July 22	7:08 p.m. CDT	@ Cardinals	**W** 4–2	**Hampton** (7–7)	Benes (6–5)	**Wagner** (18)	2:26	33,964	52–48	W4
101	July 23	7:06 p.m. CDT	@ Cardinals	**W** 7–2	**Magnante** (3–0)	Stottlemyre (9–7)	–	2:52	33,376	53–48	W5
102	July 24	7:06 p.m. CDT	Expos	**W** 10–5	**Martin** (3–2)	Telford (2–3)	–	2:55	23,889	54–48	W6
103	July 25	7:05 p.m. CDT	Expos	**W** 5–2	**Kile** (14–3)	Juden (11–4)	–	2:18	35,102	55–48	W7
104	July 26	7:06 p.m. CDT	Expos	**W** 9–8 (10)	**Wagner** (7–3)	Urbina (3–7)	–	3:21	33,868	56–48	W8
105	July 27	1:39 p.m. CDT	Expos	**W** 7–2	**Hampton** (8–7)	Bullinger (6–10)	–	2:12	26,713	57–48	W9
106	July 28	7:05 p.m. CDT	Cardinals	L 1–2	Stottlemyre (10–7)	**Holt** (7–7)	Eckersley (26)	2:20	25,995	57–49	L1
107	July 29	7:05 p.m. CDT	Cardinals	**W** 5–4	**Reynolds** (6–6)	Osborne (1–3)	**Wagner** (19)	3:06	25,399	58–49	W1
108	July 30	7:06 p.m. CDT	Cardinals	**W** 7–4	**Kile** (15–3)	Fossas (1–2)	**Martin** (1)	3:04	28,204	59–49	W2

August: 11–17 (Home: 7–7; Away: 4–10)

#	Date	Time (CT)	Opponent	Score	Win	Loss	Save	Time of Game	Attendance	Record	Box/ Streak
109	August 1	7:06 p.m. CDT	Mets	L 5–8 (10)	Franco (3–1)	**Lima** (1–5)	–	3:28	33,589	59–50	L1
110	August 2	12:15 p.m. CDT	Mets	**W** 6–0	**Hampton** (9–7)	Jones (12–7)	–	2:33	31,929	60–50	W1
111	August 3	1:35 p.m. CDT	Mets	**W** 3–2	**Martin** (4–2)	McMichael (7–9)	–	3:06	35,788	61–50	W2
112	August 4	6:05 p.m. CDT	@ Marlins	L 1–4	Hernández (6–0)	**Holt** (7–8)	Powell (2)	2:17	18,323	61–51	L1
113	August 5	6:06 p.m. CDT	@ Marlins	L 5–6	Nen (8–2)	**Wagner** (7–4)	—	3:13	25,483	61–52	L2
114	August 6	6:37 p.m. CDT	@ Phillies	L 4–6	Stephenson (6–5)	**García** (4–8)	Bottalico (21)	2:40	15,557	61–53	L3
115	August 7	12:06 p.m. CDT	@ Phillies	L 5–6 (11)	Brewer (1–2)	**Martin** (4–3)	–	3:17	18,046	62–53	L4
116	August 8	6:40 p.m. CDT	@ Mets	L 1–6	Bohanon (3–1)	**Reynolds** (6–7)	–	2:40	23,818	61–55	L5
117	August 9	6:11 p.m. CDT	@ Mets	**W** 8–3	**Springer** (2–3)	Rojas (0–5)	–	2:40	34,352	62–55	W1
118	August 10	12:41 p.m. CDT	@ Mets	**W** 11–8	**Kile** (16–3)	Reed (10–5)	**Martin** (2)	3:02	32,914	63–55	W2
119	August 11	6:41 p.m. CDT	@ Mets	**W** 8–3	**García** (5–8)	Harnisch (0–1)	–	2:49	20,452	64–55	W3
120	August 12	7:06 p.m. CDT	Marlins	**W** 13–2	**Hampton** (10–7)	Leiter (8–9)	—	2:50	19,296	65–55	W4
121	August 13	6:36 p.m. CDT	Marlins	L 6–8	Fernandez (15–8)	**Lima** (1–6)	Nen (30)	3:24	22,543	65–56	L1
122	August 15	7:05 p.m. CDT	Phillies	L 1–5	Schilling (13–10)	**Holt** (7–9)	–	2:17	31,837	65–57	L2
123	August 16	12:16 p.m. CDT	Phillies	L 3–5	Spradlin (2–6)	**Wagner** (7–5)	Bottalico (23)	2:47	28,260	65–58	L3
124	August 17	1:36 p.m. CDT	Phillies	W 11–6	**Martin** (5–3)	Gomes (2–1)	**Springer** (2)	3:36	23,161	66–58	W1
125	August 19	7:06 p.m. CDT	Braves	L 3–4	Smoltz (12–10)	**Hampton** (10–8)	Wohlers (30)	2:46	32,145	66–59	L1
126	August 20	7:06 p.m. CDT	Braves	L 1–3	Glavine (11–6)	**Reynolds** (6–8)	Wohlers (31)	2:46	25,593	66–60	L2
127	August 21	7:05 p.m. CDT	Rockies	**W** 10–4	**Holt** (8–9)	Bailey (9–9)	–	3:00	22,962	67–60	W1
128	August 22	7:05 p.m. CDT	Rockies	**W** 9–1	**Kile** (17–3)	Thomson (5–8)	–	2:49	33,061	68–60	W2
129	August 23	12:17 p.m. CDT	Rockies	L 3–6	Reed (4–5)	**Hudek** (0–2)	Dipoto (10)	3:17	32,374	68–61	L1
130	August 24	1:38 p.m. CDT	Rockies	**W** 3–1	**Hampton** (11–8)	Wright (6–10)	–	2:09	28,918	68–62	W1
131	August 26	6:40 p.m. CDT	@ Braves	L 6–7 (11)	Clontz (5–1)	**Wagner** (7–6)	–	3:47	37,313	69–62	L1
132	August 27	6:40 p.m. CDT	@ Braves	**W** 6–4 (13)	**Hudek** (1–2)	Byrd (3–3)	**Lima** (2)	4:28	33,019	70–62	W1
133	August 28	6:40 p.m. CDT	@ Braves	L 2–4	Neagle (18–3)	**Kile** (17–4)	Wohlers (32)	2:32	37,849	70–63	L1
134	August 29	7:06 p.m. CDT	@ White Sox	L 4–5	Foulke (2–5)	**Hudek** (1–3)	Karchner (11)	3:08	21,312	70–64	L2
135	August 30	6:05 p.m. CDT	@ White Sox	L 2–9	Bere (3–0)	**Hampton** (11–9)	–	2:31	28,051	70–65	L3
136	August 31	1:07 p.m. CDT	@ White Sox	L 1–3	Baldwin (11–13)	**Reynolds** (6–9)	Karchner (12)	3:18	22,916	70–66	L4

September: 15–12 (Home: 8–6; Away: 7–6)

#	Date	Time (CT)	Opponent	Score	Win	Loss	Save	Time of Game	Attendance	Record	Box/ Streak
137	September 1	1:36 p.m. CDT	Brewers	L 2–3	Adamson (5–2)	**Holt** (8–10)	Jones (30)	2:58	35,685	70–67	L5
138	September 2	7:05 p.m. CDT	Brewers	L 2–4	Villone (1–0)	**Kile** (17–5)	Jones (31)	2:42	18,258	70–68	L6
139	September 3	7:05 p.m. CDT	Brewers	**W** 4–0	**García** (6–8)	Karl (10–11)	–	2:26	13,580	71–68	W1
140	September 4	9:07 p.m. CDT	@ Giants	**W** 14–2	**Hampton** (12–9)	Gardner (12–8)	–	3:02	8,565	72–68	W2
141	September 5	9:07 p.m. CDT	@ Giants	L 1–4	Hernández (7–2)	**Reynolds** (6–10)	Beck (35)	3:19	11,934	72–69	L1
142	September 6	3:08 p.m. CDT	@ Giants	L 3–5	Tavárez (6–4)	**Wagner** (7–7)	Hernández (2)	3:21	17,636	72–70	L2
143	September 7	3:08 p.m. CDT	@ Giants	L 1–5	Rueter (11–6)	**Kile** (17–6)	–	3:17	19,861	72–71	L3
144	September 9	8:05 p.m. CDT	@ Rockies	**W** 7–4	**Hampton** (13–9)	Wright (6–11)	**Springer** (3)	2:46	48,039	73–71	W1
145	September 10	2:05 p.m. CDT	@ Rockies	L 7–9	Leskanic (4–0)	**Magnante** (3–1)	Dipoto (13)	3:08	42,321	73–72	L1
146	September 12	7:06 p.m. CDT	Dodgers	**W** 10–3	**Reynolds** (7–10)	Park (13–7)	–	3:02	36,817	74–72	W1
147	September 13	7:05 p.m. CDT	Dodgers	**W** 5–1	**Kile** (18–6)	Candiotti (10–6)	–	2:43	33,130	75–72	W2
148	September 14	1:36 p.m. CDT	Dodgers	L 3–4 (10)	Radinsky (5–1)	**Wagner** (7–8)	Worrell (35)	3:32	32,666	75–73	L1
149	September 15	7:06 p.m. CDT	Padres	L 3–4	Smith (6–5)	**Hampton** (13–10)	Hoffman (34)	3:27	22,566	75–74	L3
150	September 16	12:35 p.m. CDT	Padres	**W** 15–3	**García** (7–8)	Hitchcock (10–10)	–	3:11	15,156	76–74	W1
151	September 17	7:16 p.m. CDT	@ Pirates	**W** 8–4	**Reynolds** (8–10)	Schmidt (9–8)	–	2:52	27,422	77–74	W2
152	September 18	6:04 p.m. CDT	@ Pirates	L 3–12	Córdova (11–8)	**Kile** (18–7)	–	2:57	14,852	77–75	L1
153	September 19	6:35 p.m. CDT	@ Reds	L 4–5	Burba (10–10)	**Holt** (8–11)	Shaw (40)	2:44	21,791	77–76	L2
154	September 20	12:05 p.m. CDT	@ Reds	**W** 4–1	**Hampton** (14–10)	Tomko (11–7)	**Wagner** (20)	2:39	20,197	78–76	W1
155	September 21	1:15 p.m. CDT	@ Reds	**W** 8–3	**García** (8–8)	Morgan (8–12)	–	3:16	22,652	79–76	W2
156	September 22	11:35 a.m. CDT	@ Reds	**W** 6–3	**Springer** (3–3)	Belinda (1–5)	**Wagner** (21)	3:13	17,411	80–76	W3
157	September 23	7:06 p.m. CDT	Cubs	**W** 5–3	**Kile** (19–7)	Trachsel (8–12)	**Wagner** (22)	2:44	19,380	81–76	W4
158	September 24	7:05 p.m. CDT	Cubs	L 1–3	Clark (14–8)	**Holt** (8–12)	Adams (18)	3:00	41,560	81–77	L1
159	September 25	7:07 p.m. CDT	Cubs	**W** 9–1	**Hampton** (15–10)	González (11–9)	–	2:42	35,623	82–77	W1
160	September 26	7:06 p.m. CDT	Pirates	**W** 2–0	**García** (9–8)	Loaiza (11–11)	**Wagner** (23)	2:18	37,850	83–77	W2
161	September 27	7:05 p.m. CDT	Pirates	**W** 8–1	**Reynolds** (9–10)	Schmidt (10–9)	–	2:45	36,170	84–77	W3
162	September 28	1:35 p.m. CDT	Pirates	L 4–5 (11)	Christiansen (3–0)	**Henríquez** (0–1)	Loiselle (29)	2:58	30,606	84–78	L1

=== Detailed records ===
National League
Opponent	W	L	WP	RS	RA
NL East
Atlanta Braves
Florida Marlins	4	7	0.364	49	52
Montreal Expos
New York Mets
Philadelphia Phillies
Div Total	4	7	0.364	49	52
NL Central
Chicago Cubs
Cincinnati Reds
**Houston Astros**					
Pittsburgh Pirates
St. Louis Cardinals
Div Total
NL West
Colorado Rockies
Los Angeles Dodgers
San Diego Padres
San Francisco Giants
Div Total
League Total	4	7	0.364	49	52
American League
Chicago White Sox
Cleveland Indians	1	2	0.333	16	16
Kansas City Royals
Milwaukee Brewers
Minnesota Twins
League Total	1	2	0.333	16	16
Season Total	5	9	0.357	65	68

Month	Games	Won	Lost	Win %	RS	RA
April
May
June
July
August
September
Total

	Games	Won	Lost	Win %	RS	RA
Home
Away
Total

=== Postseason Game log ===
Legend
	Astros win
	Astros loss
	Postponement
**Bold**	Astros team member

1997 Postseason game log: 0–3 (Home: 0–1; Away: 0–2)
NL Division Series: vs. Atlanta Braves 0–3 (Home: 0–1; Away: 0–2)

#	Date	Time (CT)	Opponent	Score	Win	Loss	Save	Time of Game	Attendance	Series	Box/ Streak
1	September 30	12:07 p.m. CDT	@ Braves	L 1–2	Maddux (1–0)	**Kile** (0–1)	–	2:15	46,467	ATL 1–0	L1
2	October 1	12:07 p.m. CDT	@ Braves	L 3–13	Glavine (1–0)	**Hampton** (0–1)	–	3:06	49,200	ATL 2–0	L2
3	October 3	3:07 p.m. CDT	Braves	L 1–4	Smoltz (1–0)	**Reynolds** (0–1)	–	2:35	53,688	ATL 3–0	L3

== Player stats ==
=== Batting ===
==== Starters by position ====
Note: Pos = Position; G = Games played; AB = At bats; H = Hits; Avg. = Batting average; HR = Home runs; RBI = Runs batted in

Pos	Player	G	AB	H	Avg.	HR	RBI
C	Brad Ausmus	130	425	113	.266	4	44
1B	Jeff Bagwell	162	566	162	.286	43	135
2B	Craig Biggio	162	619	191	.309	22	81
SS	Tim Bogar	97	241	60	.249	4	30
3B	Sean Berry	96	301	77	.256	8	43
LF	Luis Gonzalez	152	550	142	.258	10	68
CF	Chuck Carr	63	192	53	.276	4	17
RF	Derek Bell	129	493	136	.276	15	71

==== Other batters ====
Note: G = Games played; AB = At bats; H = Hits; Avg. = Batting average; HR = Home runs; RBI = Runs batted in

Player	G	AB	H	Avg.	HR	RBI
Ricky Gutiérrez	102	303	79	.261	3	34
Bill Spiers	132	291	93	.320	4	48
Thomas Howard	107	255	63	.247	3	22
Bobby Abreu	59	188	47	.250	3	26
James Mouton	86	180	38	.211	3	23
Tony Eusebio	60	164	45	.274	1	18
Pat Listach	52	132	24	.182	0	6
Ray Montgomery	29	68	16	.235	0	4
Richard Hidalgo	19	62	19	.306	2	6
Russ Johnson	21	60	18	.300	2	9
Tony Peña	9	19	4	.211	0	2
J.R. Phillips	13	15	2	.133	1	4
Luis Rivera	7	13	3	.231	0	3
Ken Ramos	14	12	0	.000	0	1
Randy Knorr	4	8	3	.375	1	1

=== Pitching ===
==== Starting pitchers ====
Note: G = Games pitched; IP = Innings pitched; W = Wins; L = Losses; ERA = Earned run average; SO = Strikeouts

Player	G	IP	W	L	ERA	SO
Darryl Kile	34	255.2	19	7	2.57	205
Mike Hampton	34	223.0	15	10	3.83	139
Chris Holt	33	209.2	8	12	3.52	95
Shane Reynolds	30	181.0	9	10	4.23	152
Donne Wall	8	41.2	2	5	6.26	25
Tommy Greene	2	9.0	0	1	7.00	11
Sid Fernandez	1	5.0	1	0	3.60	3

==== Other pitchers ====
Note: G = Games pitched; IP = Innings pitched; W = Wins; L = Losses; ERA = Earned run average; SO = Strikeouts

Player	G	IP	W	L	ERA	SO
Ramón García	42	158.2	9	8	3.69	120

==== Relief pitchers ====
Note: G = Games pitched; W = Wins; L = Losses; SV = Saves; ERA = Earned run average; SO = Strikeouts

Player	G	W	L	SV	ERA	SO
Billy Wagner	62	7	8	23	2.85	106
Tom Martin	55	5	3	2	2.09	36
Russ Springer	54	3	3	3	4.23	74
José Lima	52	1	6	2	5.28	63
Mike Magnante	40	3	1	1	2.27	43
John Hudek	40	1	3	4	5.98	36
José Cabrera	12	0	0	0	1.19	18
Blas Minor	11	1	0	1	4.50	6
Óscar Henríquez	4	0	1	0	4.50	3
Manuel Barrios	2	0	0	0	12.00	3

== National League Divisional playoffs ==
The Atlanta Braves defeated the Houston Astros, three games to none.

Game	Home	Score	Visitor	Score	Date	Series
1	Atlanta	2	Houston	1	September 30	1-0 (ATL)
2	Atlanta	13	Houston	3	October 1	2-0 (ATL)
3	Houston	1	Atlanta	4	October 3	3-0 (ATL)

In the seventh inning of Game 3, Chuck Carr homered off John Smoltz which would be the final at bat of his major league career. Nineteen other National League players had previously homered in his final major league at bat; however, Carr became the first major leaguer to do so during the postseason. Carr's home run was team's final run scored of the season as Atlanta won, 4–1, to complete the series sweep and eliminate Houston. This became the first playoff series in which Houston were swept.

== Major League Baseball draft ==
Houston Astros 1997 MLB draft selections
Rd.	Slot	Draftee	Position	School	Origin	Signed	Notes	Bio
1	16	Lance Berkman	First baseman	Rice	(Texas)	Y	(Note: MLB debut on July 16, 1999 with Houston)	
2	68	Cameron Hahn	Catcher	Louisville Male HS	(Indiana)	Y		
4	130	Eric Byrnes	Outfielder	UCLA • 1997	(California)	N	(Note: Signed with the Oakland Athletics from the 1998 draft.) (Note: MLB debut on August 22, 2000, with Oakland)	

== Awards and achievements ==
=== Offensive achievements ===
==== Grand slams ====
No.	Date	Astros batter	Venue	Inning	Pitcher	Opposing team	Box
1	July 14	Brad Ausmus (Note: 1st MLB grand slam)	Wrigley Field	7 (Note: Tied score or took lead)	Kent Bottenfield	Chicago Cubs	
2	July 20	Luis Gonzalez	Olympic Stadium	8	Omar Daal	Montreal Expos	

==== Power—speed club ====
30 home runs—30 stolen bases club
Player	AVG	Runs	HR	SB	PSN
Jeff Bagwell	.286	109	43	31	36.0

=== Career honors ===
Colt .45s/Astros elected to Baseball Hall of Fame
Individual	Position	Houston Colt .45s / Astros career					Induction	
Individual	Position	Uni.	Seasons	Games	Start	Finish	Induction	
Nellie Fox	Second baseman	2	2	154	1964	1965	Class	Plaque
See also: Members of the Baseball Hall of Fame • Sources:

=== Annual awards ===
1997 Houston Astros award winners
Name of award		Recipient	Ref.
Associated Press (AP) All-Star	Second baseman	Craig Biggio	
Branch Rickey Award		Craig Biggio	
Fred Hartman Award for Long and Meritorious Service to Baseball		Bill Virdon	
Gold Glove Award	Second baseman	Craig Biggio	
Houston-Area Major League Player of the Year	TOR	Roger Clemens	
Houston Astros	Most Valuable Player (MVP) Award	Craig Biggio	
Houston Astros	Pitcher of the Year (Note: Premier year for this award.)	Darryl Kile	
Houston Astros	Rookie of the Year	Chris Holt	
MLB All-Star Game	Home Run Derby contestant	Jeff Bagwell	
MLB All-Star Game	Starting first baseman	Jeff Bagwell	
MLB All-Star Game	Starting second baseman	Craig Biggio	
MLB All-Star Game	Reserve pitcher	Darryl Kile	
National League (NL) Pitcher of the Month	July	Darryl Kile	
National League (NL) Player of the Week	April 27	Jeff Bagwell	
National League (NL) Player of the Week	July 20	Darryl Kile	
National League (NL) Player of the Week	August 24	Derek Bell	
Silver Slugger Award	First baseman	Jeff Bagwell	
Silver Slugger Award	Second baseman	Craig Biggio	
The Sporting News NL All-Stars	First baseman	Jeff Bagwell	
The Sporting News NL All-Stars	Second baseman	Craig Biggio	

Other awards results

Name of award	Voting recipient(s) (Team)	Ref.
NL Cy Young	1st—P. Martinez (MON) • 5th—Kile (HOU)	
NL Most Valuable Player	1st—L. Walker (COL) • 3rd—Bagwell (HOU) • 4th—Biggio (HOU); Other Astros: 22nd—Kile	
NL Manager of the Year	1st—D. Baker (SFG) • 3rd—Dierker (HOU)	

=== League leaders ===
NL batting leaders

- Games played: Jeff Bagwell, Craig Biggio (162—tied, led MLB)
- Plate appearances: Craig Biggio (744)
- Runs scored: Craig Biggio (146—led MLB)

NL pitching leaders

- Batters faced: Darryl Kile (1056)

NL fielding leaders

- Assists
  - All players: Craig Biggio (504)
  - As P: Mike Hampton (57)
- Caught stealing percentage: Brad Ausmus (49.5)
- Double plays turned as LF: Luis Gonzalez (2)

== Minor league system ==
Level	Team	League	Manager
AAA	New Orleans Zephyrs	American Association	Steve Swisher and Matt Galante
AA	Jackson Generals	Texas League	Dave Engle
A	Kissimmee Cobras	Florida State League	John Tamargo
A	Quad Cities River Bandits	Midwest League	Manny Acta
A-Short Season	Auburn Doubledays	New York–Penn League	Mike Rojas
Rookie	GCL Astros	Gulf Coast League	Bobby Ramos

Awards

- Triple-A All-Star—Pitcher: John Halama

== See also ==
- 30–30 club
- List of Major League Baseball annual assists leaders
- List of Major League Baseball annual runs scored leaders
- List of Major League Baseball franchise postseason streaks
- List of Major League Baseball pitchers who have thrown an immaculate inning
- List of Major League Baseball players with a home run in their final major league at bat
- List of Major League Baseball postseason sweeps
