= 1997 Colorado Rockies season =

1997 Colorado Rockies
- League: National League
- Division: West
- Ballpark: Coors Field
- City: Denver, Colorado
- Record: 83–79 (.512)
- Divisional place: 3rd
- Owner: Jerry McMorris
- General manager: Bob Gebhard
- Manager: Don Baylor
- Television: KWGN-TV; Fox Sports Rocky Mountain (Dave Campbell, Dave Armstrong)
- Radio: KOA (AM) (Wayne Hagin, Jeff Kingery); KCUV (Francisco Gamez, Antonio Guevara)
- Stats: ESPN.com; Baseball Reference

The Colorado Rockies' 1997 season was the fifth for the Major League Baseball (MLB) franchise located in Denver, Colorado, their fifth in the National League (NL), and third at Coors Field. The team competed in the National League West, finishing in third place with a record of 83–79. Right fielder Larry Walker won the NL Most Valuable Player Award (MVP), becoming the first Rockies player and Canadian-born player to do so in MLB.

In a season of contrasting dynamics, the Rockies led the NL in attendance, runs scored, batting average, on-base percentage (OBP), and slugging percentage. However, the club was last in earned run average (ERA), as only Roger Bailey and John Thomson pitched enough innings to qualify for the ERA title and both produced ERAs under 5.00. Walker, Vinny Castilla, and Andrés Galarraga each hit at least 40 home runs. Walker led the NL in home runs with 49 and OBP (.452), and the major leagues in on-base plus slugging (1.172), while Galarraga led the NL in runs batted in (140).

== Offseason ==
- November 28, 1996: Armando Reynoso was traded by the Colorado Rockies to the New York Mets for Jerry DiPoto.
- December 9, 1996: Kirt Manwaring was signed as a free agent by the Colorado Rockies.
- January 15, 1997: Juan Uribe was signed as an amateur free agent by the Colorado Rockies.
- January 24, 1997: Darnell Coles was signed as a free agent by the Colorado Rockies.
- March 26, 1997: Steve Decker was released by the Colorado Rockies.

== Regular season ==
The Rockies commenced the 1997 season on the road. Larry Walker hit two home runs in the season-opening series against the Reds in Cincinnati, and, on April 5, hit three more versus the Montreal Expos in Montreal for his first career three home run game. His first week accomplishments included a .440 batting average with six home runs in 25 at bats and the Player of the Week Award for the second time in his career on April 6. Walker concluded the month of April batting .456 with 41 hits, 29 runs scored, 11 home runs, 29 runs batted in (RBI), seven stolen bases, .538 on-base percentage (OBP), .911 slugging percentage (SLG), and 1.449 on-base plus slugging percentage (OPS). His 29 runs scored set a major league record for the month of April, until surpassed by Bryce Harper in 2017. Walker was named NL Player of the Month for the first time. The Rockies concluded the month of April with a 17–7 record for a .708 winning percentage, their most successful month of 1997.

Perhaps the most famous home run first baseman Andrés Galarraga hit was a mammoth grand slam off Kevin Brown on May 31, which landed 20 rows deep into the upper deck at Florida Marlins' Pro Player Stadium. It may also be his most debated home run with a distance initially measured at 573 feet (175 m) and then 529 feet (161 m). At the time, it set a record for both the Rockies and the stadium. In 2011, ESPN's Home Run Tracker recalculated the distance to 468 feet (143 m).

In the June 20 contest versus the San Diego Padres, Walker collected his 108th hit of the season and the 1,000th of his career while batting against Andy Ashby.

Walker continued to hit near or above .400 in July, when he was selected to play in the All-Star Game. His remarkable season continued: as late as July 17, he was hitting .402. The Rockies struggled in the month of July, losing 19 of 27 games for a .296 winning percentage.

Third baseman Vinny Castilla replicated the exact totals in batting average (.304), home runs (40), and RBI (113) as he had produced in 1996, with one fewer game played (159) and one point less in slugging percentage (.547).

The Rockies led the NL in attendance at more than 3.88 million. They also led the league in runs scored (923), home runs (239), batting (.288), OBP (.357), and SLG (.478). They were last in ERA at 5.25.

The career season for Walker was 1997, when he hit .366 with 49 home runs, 130 RBI, 33 stolen bases, and 409 total bases, en route to becoming the first Canadian-born and Colorado Rockies player to win the MVP Award in MLB. Combined with 12 outfield assists, the season remains one of the finest all around performances in recent baseball history. Even more impressively, Walker's breakout season came just one year after various injuries limited him to 83 games and 272 at-bats, although the NL Comeback Player of the Year award went to Darren Daulton.

=== Season standings ===
NL West
Team	W	L	Pct.	GB	Home	Road
San Francisco Giants	90	72	.556	—	48‍–‍33	42‍–‍39
Los Angeles Dodgers	88	74	.543	2	47‍–‍34	41‍–‍40
Colorado Rockies	83	79	.512	7	47‍–‍34	36‍–‍45
San Diego Padres	76	86	.469	14	39‍–‍42	37‍–‍44

=== Record vs. opponents ===
1997 National League record Source: MLB Standings Grid – 1997
Team	ATL	CHC	CIN	COL	FLA	HOU	LAD	MON	NYM	PHI	PIT	SD	SF	STL	AL
Atlanta	—	9–2	9–2	5–6	4–8	7–4	6–5	10–2	5–7	10–2	5–6	8–3	7–4	8–3	8–7
Chicago	2–9	—	7–5	2–9	2–9	3–9	5–6	4–7	6–5	6–5	7–5	6–5	5–6	4–8	9–6
Cincinnati	2–9	5–7	—	5–6	5–6	5–7	6–5	6–5	2–9	8–3	8–4	5–6	4–7	6–6	9–6
Colorado	6–5	9–2	6–5	—	7–4	5–6	5–7	7–4	6–5	4–7	4–7	4–8	4–8	7–4	9–7
Florida	8–4	9–2	6–5	4–7	—	7–4	7–4	7–5	4–8	6–6	7–4	5–6	5–6	5–6	12–3
Houston	4–7	9–3	7–5	6–5	4–7	—	7–4	8–3	7–4	4–7	6–6	6–5	3–8	9–3	4–11
Los Angeles	5–6	6–5	5–6	7–5	4–7	4–7	—	7–4	6–5	10–1	9–2	5–7	6–6	5–6	9–7
Montreal	2–10	7–4	5–6	4–7	5–7	3–8	4–7	—	5–7	6–6	5–6	8–3	6–5	6–5	12–3
New York	7–5	5–6	9–2	5–6	8–4	4–7	5–6	7–5	—	7–5	7–4	5–6	3–8	9–2	7–8
Philadelphia	2–10	5–6	3–8	7–4	6–6	7–4	1–10	6–6	5–7	—	5–6	7–4	3–8	6–5	5–10
Pittsburgh	6–5	5–7	4–8	7–4	4–7	6–6	2–9	6–5	4–7	6–5	—	5–6	8–3	9–3	7–8
San Diego	3–8	5–6	6–5	8–4	6–5	5–6	7–5	3–8	6–5	4–7	6–5	—	4–8	5–6	8–8
San Francisco	4–7	6–5	7–4	8–4	6–5	8–3	6–6	5–6	8–3	8–3	3–8	8–4	—	3–8	10–6
St. Louis	3–8	8–4	6–6	4–7	6–5	3–9	6–5	5–6	2–9	5–6	3–9	6–5	8–3	—	8–7

=== Transactions ===
- May 23, 1997: Darnell Coles was purchased by the Hanshin Tigers (Japan Central) from the Colorado Rockies.
- June 3, 1997: Aaron Cook was drafted by the Colorado Rockies in the 2nd round of the 1997 amateur draft. Player signed July 13, 1997.
- June 3, 1997: Chone Figgins was drafted by the Colorado Rockies in the 4th round of the 1997 amateur draft. Player signed June 9, 1997.
- July 27, 1997: Craig Counsell was traded by the Colorado Rockies to the Florida Marlins for Mark Hutton.
- August 19, 1997: Eric Young was traded by the Colorado Rockies to the Los Angeles Dodgers for Pedro Astacio.
- August 20, 1997: Bill Swift was released by the Colorado Rockies.

=== Major League debuts ===
- Batters:
  - Todd Helton (Aug 2)
- Pitchers:
  - Mike DeJean (May 2)
  - John Thomson (May 11)
  - Bobby Jones (May 18)

=== Roster ===
1997 Colorado Rockies
Roster
Pitchers: 34 Pedro Astacio; 31 Roger Bailey; 41 Robbie Beckett; 37 John Burke; 48 Frank Castillo; 44 Mike DeJean; 45 Jerry DiPoto; 40 Darren Holmes; 53 Mark Hutton; 36 Bobby Jones; 16 Curtis Leskanic; 38 Jeff McCurry; 47 Nate Minchey; 43 Mike Munoz; 39 Steve Reed; 23 Bryan Rekar; 30 Kevin Ritz; 18 Bruce Ruffin; 54 Tim Scott; 20 Bill Swift; 32 Mark Thompson; 52 John Thomson; 19 Jamey Wright	Catchers: 8 Kirt Manwaring; 15 Jeff Reed; Infielders: 6 Jason Bates; 9 Vinny Castilla; 28 Darnell Coles; 14 Andrés Galarraga; 28 Rene Gonzales; 5 Neifi Pérez; 12 Brian Raabe; 22 Walt Weiss; 21 Eric Young	Outfielders: 10 Dante Bichette; 26 Ellis Burks; 11 Angel Echevarria; 17 Todd Helton; 3 Quinton McCracken; 24 Harvey Pulliam; 35 John Vander Wal; 33 Larry Walker; Other batters: 4 Craig Counsell	Manager: 25 Don Baylor; Coaches: 46 P. J. Carey (bullpen); 49 Frank Funk (pitching); 2 Gene Glynn (third base); 13 Clint Hurdle (hitting/first base); 42 Jackie Moore (bench)

=== Game log ===
1997 Game Log
April

#	Date	Opponent	Score	Win	Loss	Save	Attendance	Record
1	April 1	@ Reds	11–4	Smiley (1–0)	Ritz (0–1)	Jarvis (1)	54,820	0–1
2	April 2	@ Reds	5–3	Burba (1–0)	Swift (0–1)	Shaw (1)	20,210	0–2
3	April 3	@ Reds	7–1	Thompson (1–0)	Schourek (0–1)		22,660	1–2
4	April 4	@ Expos	5–4	Wright (1–0)	Valdes (0–1)	Ruffin (1)	19,890	2–2
5	April 5	@ Expos	15–3	Bailey (1–0)	Cormier (0–1)		30,919	3–2
6	April 6	@ Expos	6–2	Ritz (1–1)	Bullinger (0–1)		15,690	4–2
7	April 7	Reds	13–2	Swift (1–1)	Burba (1–1)	Holmes (1)	48,014	5–2
8	April 9	Reds	13–4	Thompson (2–0)	Bones (0–1)		50,095	6–2
9	April 12	Expos	12–8	Wright (2–0)	Bullinger (0–2)	DiPoto (1)	50,010	7–2
10	April 13	Expos	8–3	Pérez (2–0)	Ritz (1–2)	Daal (1)	50,029	7–3
11	April 14	Expos	10–8	DiPoto (1–0)	Stull (0–1)	Ruffin (2)	48,011	8–3
12	April 15	@ Cubs	10–7	Thompson (3–0)	Foster (0–1)		15,496	9–3
13	April 16	@ Cubs	4–0	Bailey (2–0)	Castillo (0–3)		13,890	10–3
14	April 18	Braves	14–0	Glavine (3–0)	Wright (2–1)		48,070	10–4
15	April 19	Braves	8–7	Neagle (2–0)	Ritz (1–3)	Bielecki (1)	48,065	10–5
16	April 20	Braves	9–2	Holmes (1–0)	Smoltz (2–3)		48,155	11–5
17	April 22	Marlins	13–4	Bailey (3–0)	Rapp (2–1)		48,034	12–5
18	April 23	Marlins	7–3	Wright (3–1)	Brown (2–1)	Ruffin (3)	50,017	13–5
19	April 25	@ Cardinals	5–4	Ritz (2–3)	Benes (2–2)	Ruffin (4)	29,675	14–5
20	April 26	@ Cardinals	4–2	Swift (2–1)	Morris (0–1)	Ruffin (5)	45,681	15–5
21	April 27	@ Cardinals	6–2	Osborne (1–2)	Thompson (3–1)		30,615	15–6
22	April 28	@ Astros	7–6 (10)	McCurry (1–0)	Wagner (2–1)	Ruffin (6)	13,510	16–6
23	April 29	@ Astros	3–1	Wall (1–0)	Bailey (3–1)	Hudek (4)	13,567	16–7
24	April 30	Cubs	11–5	Ritz (3–3)	Foster (2–2)		48,017	17–7

May

#	Date	Opponent	Score	Win	Loss	Save	Attendance	Record
25	May 1	Cubs	5–4	Swift (3–1)	Castillo (1–4)	Reed (1)	48,052	18–7
26	May 2	Phillies	7–4	Muñoz (1–4)	Thompson (3–2)	Bottalico (6)	48,031	18–8
27	May 3	Phillies	7–3	Wright (4–1)	Portugal (0–2)		48,050	19–8
28	May 4	Phillies	9–0	Bailey (4–1)	Maduro (2–3)		48,107	20–8
29	May 5	Mets	6–1	Jones (5–2)	Ritz (3–4)		48,036	20–9
30	May 6	Mets	12–11	Swift (4–1)	Borland (0–1)	Reed (2)	48,020	21–9
31	May 7	Pirates	14–3	Wilkins (2–0)	Thompson (3–3)		48,056	21–10
32	May 8	Pirates	10–8	Loaiza (4–0)	Wright (4–2)	Loiselle (2)	48,050	21–11
33	May 9	@ Phillies	3–1	Maduro (3–3)	Bailey (4–2)	Bottalico (7)	13,564	21–12
34	May 10	@ Phillies	5–4 (10)	Bottalico (1–1)	Reed (0–1)		17,629	21–13
35	May 11	@ Phillies	3–1	Schilling (5–3)	Thomson (0–1)		21,282	21–14
36	May 12	@ Phillies	9–2	DeJean (1–0)	Muñoz (1–5)		12,603	22–14
37	May 14	@ Pirates	15–10	Wilkins (3–0)	Reed (0–2)		11,841	22–15
38	May 15	@ Pirates	4–3	Córdova (3–3)	Bailey (4–3)	Rincón (3)	8,548	22–16
39	May 16	@ Mets	2–1	Munoz (1–0)	McMichael (3–4)	Ruffin (7)	15,261	23–16
40	May 17	@ Mets	3–1	Jones (7–2)	Thomson (0–2)	Franco (12)	23,987	23–17
41	May 18	@ Mets	10–4	Kashiwada (1–0)	Ruffin (0–1)		22,845	23–18
42	May 19	@ Mets	4–3	Lidle (2–0)	McCurry (1–1)		14,248	23–19
43	May 20	@ Giants	6–3	Van Landingham (2–2)	Bailey (4–4)	Beck (15)	12,431	23–20
44	May 21	@ Giants	10–7	Ritz (4–4)	Rueter (2–1)	Reed (3)	12,268	24–20
45	May 22	@ Giants	7–2	Gardner (6–1)	Thomson (0–3)		10,811	24–21
46	May 23	Astros	8–7	Jones (1–0)	Wall (1–2)	Reed (4)	48,127	25–21
47	May 24	Astros	7–0	Kile (5–2)	Burke (0–1)		48,129	25–22
48	May 25	Astros	8–5	Bailey (5–4)	García (2–3)	Munoz (1)	48,222	26–22
49	May 26	Cardinals	9–7	DeJean (2–0)	Petkovsek (2–4)	Reed (5)	48,043	27–22
50	May 27	Cardinals	8–6	Benes (4–4)	Thomson (0–4)	Eckersley (9)	50,010	27–23
51	May 29	@ Marlins	6–5	Holmes (2–0)	Nen (4–2)	Reed (6)	19,145	28–23
52	May 30	@ Marlins	4–3 (12)	Hutton (3–1)	DiPoto (1–1)		35,731	28–24
53	May 31	@ Marlins	8–4	Ritz (5–4)	Brown (5–3)	DeJean (1)	35,032	29–24

June

#	Date	Opponent	Score	Win	Loss	Save	Attendance	Record
54	June 1	@ Marlins	9–2	Thomson (1–4)	Helling (1–4)		41,816	30–24
55	June 2	@ Cardinals	11–7	Burke (1–1)	Jackson (1–1)		22,653	31–24
56	June 3	@ Cardinals	15–4	Morris (3–3)	Jones (1–1)		34,038	31–25
57	June 4	Padres	7–5	Cunnane (4–1)	Bailey (5–5)	Bochtler (2)	48,049	31–26
58	June 5	Padres	9–7 (11)	Reed (1–2)	Burrows (0–1)		48,018	32–26
59	June 7	Marlins	7–5	Heredia (3–0)	Holmes (2–1)	Nen (16)	48,052	32–27
60	June 8	Marlins	7–2	Burke (2–1)	Leiter (5–4)	DiPoto (2)	48,055	33–27
61	June 8	Marlins	9–1 (7)	Fernandez (6–6)	Wright (4–3)		48,033	33–28
62	June 9	Braves	8–3	Bailey (6–5)	Glavine (6–4)		48,047	34–28
63	June 10	Braves	8–3	Neagle (9–1)	Ritz (5–5)		48,103	34–29
64	June 11	Braves	9–6	Thomson (2–4)	Clontz (2–1)		48,633	35–29
65	June 12	@ Mariners	12–11	Wells (2–0)	Munoz (1–1)	Ayala (4)	37,948	35–30
66	June 13	@ Mariners	6–1	Johnson (10–1)	Wright (4–4)		55,980	35–31
67	June 14	@ Athletics	7–1	Bailey (7–5)	Wengert (3–4)		25,139	36–31
68	June 15	@ Athletics	5–2	Prieto (5–4)	Ritz (5–6)	Taylor (13)	24,333	36–32
69	June 17	Rangers	10–8 (11)	Patterson (5–3)	Reed (1–3)		48,243	36–33
70	June 18	Rangers	10–9	Leskanic (1–0)	Wetteland (4–1)		43,432	37–33
71	June 19	@ Padres	8–4	Bailey (8–5)	Jackson (1–4)		19,146	38–33
72	June 20	@ Padres	5–2	Ashby (3–3)	Munoz (1–2)	Hoffman (11)	20,602	38–34
73	June 21	@ Padres	9–4	Rekar (1–0)	Bergman (1–2)		43,044	39–34
74	June 22	@ Padres	4–2	Worrell (3–6)	Ruffin (0–2)	Hoffman (12)	28,893	39–35
75	June 23	@ Dodgers	5–3	Nomo (7–6)	Ritz (5–7)	Hall (1)	31,076	39–36
76	June 24	@ Dodgers	6–2	Holmes (3–1)	Astacio (3–7)		45,194	40–36
77	June 25	@ Dodgers	2–0	Valdez (4–8)	Burke (2–2)	Hall (2)	30,963	40–37
78	June 26	Giants	7–6	DeJean (3–0)	Foulke (1–2)	Leskanic (1)	48,301	41–37
79	June 27	Giants	6–3	Rueter (5–2)	Thomson (2–5)	Beck (26)	48,225	41–38
80	June 28	Giants	9–2	Ritz (6–7)	Gardner (8–4)		48,273	42–38
81	June 29	Giants	7–4	Estes (11–2)	Bailey (8–6)		48,384	42–39
82	June 30	Angels	11–7	DiPoto (2–1)	Gross (1–1)		48,359	43–39

July

#	Date	Opponent	Score	Win	Loss	Save	Attendance	Record
83	July 1	Angels	4–1	Finley (4–6)	Burke (2–3)	Percival (10)	48,235	43–40
84	July 2	@ Rangers	9–1	Burkett (6–7)	Thomson (2–6)		38,569	43–41
85	July 3	@ Rangers	8–3	Oliver (5–9)	Ritz (6–8)		38,907	43–42
86	July 4	@ Giants	4–0	Estes (12–2)	Wright (4–5)	Beck (28)	41,566	43–43
87	July 5	@ Giants	2–1	Tavárez (2–2)	Munoz (1–3)	Beck (29)	34,148	43–44
88	July 6	@ Giants	7–0	Gardner (9–4)	Burke (2–4)		28,252	43–45
89	July 10	Padres	11–5	Ashby (5–5)	Burke (2–5)		45,833	43–46
90	July 11	Padres	6–5 (11)	DiPoto (3–1)	Hoffman (3–4)		48,053	44–46
91	July 12	Padres	11–7	Hamilton (7–3)	Swift (4–2)	Hoffman (17)	48,179	44–47
92	July 13	Padres	13–11	Batchelor (3–1)	McCurry (1–2)	Hoffman (18)	48,053	44–48
93	July 14	Dodgers	14–12 (10)	Radinsky (4–1)	Reed (1–4)	Worrell (22)	48,360	44–49
94	July 15	Dodgers	6–5	Park (7–5)	Bailey (8–7)	Worrell (23)	48,621	44–50
95	July 16	@ Braves	2–1	Glavine (10–5)	DiPoto (3–2)	Wohlers (23)	48,400	44–51
96	July 17	@ Braves	8–2	Maddux (13–3)	Swift (4–3)		48,024	44–52
97	July 19	@ Cubs	7–0	Trachsel (5–7)	Wright (4–6)			44–53
98	July 19	@ Cubs	6–5	Wendell (3–5)	McCurry (1–3)	Rojas (11)	40,751	44–54
99	July 20	@ Cubs	9–5	Leskanic (2–0)	Adams (1–5)	Holmes (2)	36,861	45–54
100	July 21	@ Expos	8–4	Urbina (3–6)	Holmes (3–2)		20,540	45–55
101	July 22	@ Expos	11–9 (12)	Reed (2–4)	Veres (2–3)		22,518	46–55
102	July 24	Cubs	7–1	Wright (5–6)	Trachsel (5–8)		48,294	47–55
103	July 25	Cubs	9–3	Castillo (7–9)	Foster (10–6)		48,279	48–55
104	July 26	Cubs	6–3	Bailey (9–7)	Mulholland (6–10)	Holmes (3)	48,108	49–55
105	July 27	Cubs	4–0	Thomson (3–6)	González (7–4)		48,378	50–55
106	July 28	Expos	3–2	Pérez (10–6)	Swift (4–4)	Urbina (18)	48,066	50–56
107	July 29	Expos	3–0	Martínez (12–5)	Wright (5–7)		48,117	50–57
108	July 30	Expos	12–6	Castillo (8–9)	Juden (11–5)		48,405	51–57
109	July 31	@ Pirates	4–1	Schmidt (6–6)	Bailey (9–8)	Loiselle (16)	16,654	51–58

August

#	Date	Opponent	Score	Win	Loss	Save	Attendance	Record
110	August 1	@ Pirates	7–6	Reed (3–4)	Rincón (4–5)	DiPoto (3)	22,657	52–58
111	August 2	@ Pirates	6–5	Córdova (8–6)	Swift (4–5)	Loiselle (17)	32,388	52–59
112	August 3	@ Pirates	8–4	Ruebel (3–2)	Reed (3–5)		24,989	52–60
113	August 4	@ Phillies	7–3	Green (2–1)	Castillo (8–10)		15,230	52–61
114	August 5	@ Phillies	4–2	Holmes (4–2)	Bottalico (2–4)	DiPoto (4)	16,428	53–61
115	August 6	@ Mets	4–0	Thomson (4–6)	Mlicki (5–8)		26,633	54–61
116	August 7	@ Mets	12–4	Clark (8–7)	Swift (4–6)		29,536	54–62
117	August 8	Pirates	5–3	Wright (6–7)	Lieber (6–12)	DiPoto (5)	48,262	55–62
118	August 9	Pirates	8–7	Munoz (2–3)	Rincón (4–6)		48,323	56–62
119	August 10	Pirates	8–7	Leskanic (3–0)	Wilkins (7–3)	DiPoto (6)	48,018	57–62
120	August 12	Phillies	5–0	Beech (1–7)	Thomson (4–7)		48,228	57–63
121	August 13	Phillies	12–8	Leiter (8–12)	Wright (6–8)		48,491	57–64
122	August 15	Mets	6–2	Castillo (9–10)	Reed (10–6)		48,308	58–64
123	August 16	Mets	7–5	Holmes (5–2)	McMichael (7–10)	DiPoto (7)	48,311	59–64
124	August 17	Mets	6–4	Thomson (5–7)	Mlicki (5–10)	DiPoto (8)	48,440	60–64
125	August 19	@ Reds	6–5	Morgan (5–10)	Wright (6–9)	Shaw (25)	31,722	60–65
126	August 20	@ Reds	5–3	Castillo (10–10)	White (1–1)	DiPoto (9)	21,968	61–65
127	August 21	@ Astros	10–4	Holt (8–9)	Bailey (9–9)		22,962	61–66
128	August 22	@ Astros	9–1	Kile (17–3)	Thomson (5–8)		33,061	61–67
129	August 23	@ Astros	6–3	Reed (4–5)	Hudek (0–2)	DiPoto (10)	32,374	62–67
130	August 24	@ Astros	3–1	Hampton (11–8)	Wright (6–10)		28,918	62–68
131	August 25	Reds	7–6	Martínez (1–0)	Castillo (10–11)	Shaw (26)	48,143	62–69
132	August 25	Reds	6–4	White (2–1)	Hutton (3–2)	Shaw (27)	48,081	62–70
133	August 26	Reds	9–5	DeJean (4–0)	Martínez (1–1)		48,063	63–70
134	August 27	Reds	7–5	Thomson (6–8)	Remlinger (6–6)	DiPoto (11)	48,032	64–70
135	August 28	Mariners	9–5	Astacio (8–9)	Olivares (6–9)		48,422	65–70
136	August 29	Mariners	6–5	DiPoto (4–2)	Timlin (3–3)		48,178	66–70
137	August 30	Athletics	4–3	DiPoto (5–2)	Mohler (1–10)		48,308	67–70
138	August 31	Athletics	10–4	Holmes (6–2)	Oquist (2–5)		48,041	68–70

September

#	Date	Opponent	Score	Win	Loss	Save	Attendance	Record
139	September 1	@ Angels	4–1	Thomson (7–8)	Watson (11–9)	DiPoto (12)	19,614	69–70
140	September 2	@ Angels	7–2	Astacio (9–9)	Dickson (13–7)	Munoz (2)	18,266	70–70
141	September 5	Cardinals	11–4	Castillo (11–11)	Osborne (3–7)		48,051	71–70
142	September 6	Cardinals	10–7 (13)	Eckersley (1–4)	McCurry (1–4)	Petkovsek (2)	48,017	71–71
143	September 6	Cardinals	7–6	Holmes (7–2)	King (3–1)		44,288	72–71
144	September 7	Cardinals	7–4	Astacio (10–9)	Petkovsek (4–6)		48,011	73–71
145	September 9	Astros	7–4	Hampton (13–9)	Wright (6–11)	Springer (3)	48,039	73–72
146	September 10	Astros	9–7	Leskanic (4–0)	Magnante (3–1)	DiPoto (13)	42,321	74–72
147	September 12	@ Braves	3–1	Munoz (3–3)	Wohlers (5–6)	DiPoto (14)	47,772	75–72
148	September 13	@ Braves	10–6	Holmes (8–2)	Cather (0–4)	DeJean (2)	49,097	76–72
149	September 14	@ Braves	4–0	Astacio (11–9)	Smoltz (14–12)		46,245	77–72
150	September 15	@ Marlins	7–1	Wright (7–11)	Fernandez (17–11)		19,148	78–72
151	September 16	@ Marlins	9–6	Powell (7–2)	DiPoto (5–3)		21,990	78–73
152	September 17	@ Padres	5–4	Ashby (9–11)	Thomson (7–9)	Hoffman (35)	15,768	78–74
153	September 18	@ Padres	7–6	Menhart (2–2)	Bailey (9–10)	Hoffman (36)	15,067	78–75
154	September 19	@ Dodgers	6–4	Astacio (12–9)	Nomo (13–12)	DiPoto (15)	53,408	79–75
155	September 20	@ Dodgers	2–1	Wright (8–11)	Osuna (3–4)	DiPoto (16)	45,780	80–75
156	September 21	@ Dodgers	10–5	Castillo (12–11)	Martínez (9–5)		53,903	81–75
157	September 23	Giants	7–6	Holmes (9–2)	Darwin (5–11)	Leskanic (2)	48,026	82–75
158	September 24	Giants	4–3	Hernández (10–3)	Reed (4–6)		48,035	82–76
159	September 25	Dodgers	9–5	Nomo (14–12)	Astacio (12–10)		48,020	82–77
160	September 26	Dodgers	10–4	Valdez (10–11)	Wright (8–12)		48,016	82–78
161	September 27	Dodgers	6–1	Martínez (10–5)	Castillo (12–12)		48,125	82–79
162	September 28	Dodgers	13–9	DeJean (5–0)	Reyes (2–3)		48,197	83–79

== Player statistics ==
= Indicates team leader

=== Batting ===
Legend
Pos	Position	R	Runs scored	HR	Home runs	SB	Stolen bases	AVG	Batting average
G	Games played	H	Hits	RBI	Runs batted in	CS	Caught stealing	OBP	On-base percentage
PA	Plate appearances	2B	Doubles	BB	Bases on balls	HBP	HBP	SLG	Slugging percentage
AB	At bats	3B	Triples	SO	Strikeouts	GIDP	GIDP	OPS	On-base plus slugging percentage

	Key to symbols and categories
**Names**	* – left-handed batter or pitcher; # – switch hitter; Bold: active and on both 25-man roster and 40-man roster; ''₤ – on 40-man roster but not 25-man roster; Italics: on 10-day disabled list (DL) or 60-day DL (§)
**Starting lineup** / **rotation**	Table half above first double line: Appeared in most games at that position or top five pitchers in starts Below double line: Ranked by AB regardless of position for position players / Role, then IP for pitchers
**Statistics**	: Team leader; Bold: Major League Baseball (MLB) leader or tied for lead; **Bold** (non-italicized): American (AL) or National League (NL) leader or tied for lead; ^{†} – top-ten in AL or NL

Pos	Player	G	PA	AB	R	H	2B	3B	HR	RBI	BB	SO	SB	CS	TB	AVG	OBP	SLG	OPS
C	Kirt Manwaring	104	375	337	22	76	6	4	1	27	30	78	1	5	93	.226	.291	.276	.567
1B	Andrés Galarraga	154	674	600^{†}	120^{†}	191^{†}	31	3	41^{†}	**140**	54	141^{†}	15	8	351^{†}	.318^{†}	.389	.585^{†}	.974^{†}
2B	Eric Young	118	543	468	78	132	29	6^{†}	6	45	57	37	32^{†}	12^{†}	191	.282	.363	.408	.771
SS	Walt Weiss ^{#}	121	469	393	52	106	23	5	4	38	66	56	5	2	151	.270	.377	.384	.761
3B	Vinny Castilla	159^{†}	668	612^{†}	94	186^{†}	25	2	40^{†}	113^{†}	44	108	2	4	335^{†}	.304	.356	.547^{†}	.904^{†}
LF	Dante Bichette	151	602	561	81	173	31	2	26	118^{†}	30	90	6	5	286	.308	.343	.510	.853
CF	Quinton McCracken ^{#}	147	375	325	69	95	11	1	3	36	42	62	28	11	117	.292	.374	.360	.734
RF	Larry Walker *	153	664	568	143^{†}	208^{†}	46^{†}	4	**49**	130^{†}	78	90	33^{†}	8	**409**	.366^{†}	**.452**	**.720**	**1.172**
OF	Ellis Burks	119	478	424	91	123	19	2	32	82	47	75	7	2	242	.290	.363	.571	.934
MI	Neifi Pérez ^{#}	83	344	313	46	91	13	10^{†}	5	31	21	43	4	3	139	.291	.333	.444	.777
C	Jeff Reed *	90	298	256	43	76	10	0	17	47	35	55	2	1	137	.297	.386	.535	.921
IF	Jason Bates ^{#}	62	139	121	17	29	10	0	3	11	15	27	0	1	48	.240	.338	.397	.735
UT	John Vander Wal *	76	102	92	7	16	2	0	1	11	10	33	1	1	21	.174	.255	.228	.455
UT	Todd Helton *	35	101	93	13	26	2	1	5	11	8	11	0	1	45	.280	.337	.484	.821
OF	Harvey Pulliam	59	72	67	15	19	3	0	3	9	5	15	0	1	31	.284	.333	.463	.796
UT	Darnell Coles	21	23	22	1	7	1	0	1	2	0	6	0	0	11	.318	.348	.500	.848
OF	Angel Echevarria	15	22	20	4	5	2	0	0	0	2	5	0	0	7	.250	.318	.350	.668
2B	Brian Raabe	2	4	3	0	1	0	0	0	0	0	1	0	0	1	.333	.333	.333	.667
3B	Rene Gonzales	2	2	2	0	1	0	0	0	1	0	0	0	0	1	.500	.500	.500	1.000
PR	Craig Counsell	1	0	0	0	0	0	0	0	0	0	0	0	0	0	----	----	----	----
—	Pitcher Totals	162	383	326	27	50	5	0	2	17	18	127	1	0	61	.153	.199	.187	.386
**Team totals**		**162**	**6338**	**5603**	**923**	**1611**	**269**	**40**	**239**	**869**	**562**	**1060**	**137**	**65**	**2677**	**.288**	**.357**	**.478**	**.835**
**NL rank of 14 teams**				**2**	**1**	**1**	**8**	**2**	**1**		**6**	**4**	**6**	**11**	**1**	**1**	**1**	**1**	**1**
Pos	Player	G	PA	AB	R	H	2B	3B	HR	RBI	BB	SO	SB	CS	TB	AVG	OBP	SLG	OPS

=== Pitching ===
==== Starting pitchers ====
Note: G = Games pitched; IP = Innings pitched; W = Wins; L = Losses; ERA = Earned run average; SO = Strikeouts

Player	G	IP	W	L	ERA	SO
Roger Bailey	29	191.0	9	10	4.29	84
John Thomson	27	166.1	7	9	4.71	106
Jamey Wright	26	149.2	8	12	6.25	59
Kevin Ritz	18	107.1	6	8	5.87	56
Frank Castillo	14	86.1	6	3	5.42	59
Bill Swift	14	65.1	4	6	6.34	29
Pedro Astacio	7	48.2	5	1	4.25	51
Mark Thompson	6	29.2	3	3	7.89	9
Bobby Jones	4	19.1	1	1	8.38	5
Bryan Rekar	2	9.1	1	0	5.79	4

==== Other pitchers ====
Note: G = Games pitched; IP = Innings pitched; W = Wins; L = Losses; ERA = Earned run average; SO = Strikeouts

Player	G	IP	W	L	ERA	SO
Darren Holmes	42	89.1	9	2	5.34	70
John Burke	17	59.0	2	5	6.56	39
Jeff McCurry	33	40.2	1	4	4.43	19
Mark Hutton	8	12.2	0	1	7.11	10

==== Relief pitchers ====
Note: G = Games pitched; W = Wins; L = Losses; SV = Saves; ERA = Earned run average; SO = Strikeouts

Player	G	W	L	SV	ERA	SO
Jerry DiPoto	74	5	3	16	4.70	74
Mike Munoz	64	3	3	2	4.53	26
Steve Reed	63	4	6	6	4.04	43
Mike DeJean	55	5	0	2	3.99	38
Curtis Leskanic	55	4	0	2	5.55	53
Bruce Ruffin	23	0	2	7	5.32	31
Tim Scott	3	0	0	0	10.13	2
Nate Minchey	2	0	0	0	13.50	1
Robbie Beckett	2	0	0	0	5.40	2

== Awards, league leaders and accomplishments ==
=== National League leaders ===
==== Offensive statistics ====
- At bats per home run: Larry Walker (11.6)
- Extra base hits: Larry Walker (99) ^{†}
- Home runs: Larry Walker (49)
- Offensive win %: Larry Walker (.857) ^{†}
- On-base percentage: Larry Walker (.452)
- On-base plus slugging percentage: Larry Walker (1.172) ^{†}
- Power–speed number: Larry Walker (39.4)
- Runs batted in: Andrés Galarraga (140)
- Slugging percentage: Larry Walker (.720) ^{†}
- Total bases: Larry Walker (409) ^{†}
- Wins Above Replacement: Larry Walker (9.8) ^{†}
- Notes: ^{†} – led MLB. References:

==== Defensive statistics ====
- Assists at third base: Vinny Castilla (323)
- Double plays turned:
  - at first base: Andrés Galarraga (176)
  - at third base: Vinny Castilla (41)
  - all outfielders and at right field: Larry Walker (4)
  - at center field: Quinton McCracken (3)
- Fielding percentage:
  - at left field: Dante Bichette (.991)
  - at right field: Larry Walker (.992)
  - at pitcher: Roger Bailey (1.000)
- Putouts for all fielders and at first base: Andrés Galarraga (1,458)
- Range factor per game:
  - at first base: Andrés Galarraga (10.23)
  - at shortstop: Walt Weiss (4.73)
- Range factor per nine innings:
  - at first base: Andrés Galarraga (10.69)
  - at shortstop: Walt Weiss (5.22)
  - at pitcher: Roger Bailey (3.06)

=== Awards ===
- All-Star Game selectees:
  - Andrés Galarraga
  - Larry Walker (starter at right field)
- Baseball Digest Player of the Year: Larry Walker
- Colorado Rockies Player of the Year: Larry Walker
- National League Most Valuable Player (MVP): Larry Walker
- National League Player of the Month: Larry Walker (April)
- National League Players of the Week:
  - 2× Larry Walker (April 6 & September 21)
  - Vinny Castilla (April 13)
  - Ellis Burks (May 25)
  - Dante Bichette (July 27)
- Rawlings Gold Glove at outfield: Larry Walker
- Silver Slugger
  - at third base: Vinny Castilla
  - at outfield: Larry Walker
- Tip O'Neill Award: Larry Walker

== Farm system ==
Level	Team	League	Manager
AAA	Colorado Springs Sky Sox	Pacific Coast League	Paul Zuvella
AA	New Haven Ravens	Eastern League	Bill Hayes
A	Salem Avalanche	Carolina League	Bill McGuire
A	Asheville Tourists	South Atlantic League	Ron Gideon
A-Short Season	Portland Rockies	Northwest League	Jim Eppard
Rookie	AZL Rockies	Arizona League	Tim Blackwell

LEAGUE CHAMPIONS: Portland

== See also ==
- 30–30 club
- List of Colorado Rockies team records
- List of Gold Glove Award winners at outfield
- List of Major League Baseball annual home run leaders
- List of Major League Baseball annual putouts leaders
- List of Major League Baseball annual runs batted in leaders
- List of National League annual slugging percentage leaders
- List of Silver Slugger Award winners at third base
- List of Silver Slugger Award winners at outfield

Records
Preceded by 1996	Colorado Rockies seasons 1997	Succeeded by 1998
