= Roger Bailey =

Roger Bailey may refer to:

- Roger Bailey (baseball)
- Roger Bailey (rugby league)
- Roger Bailey (My Family)
