= Andrés Galarraga =

Venezuelan baseball player (born 1961)

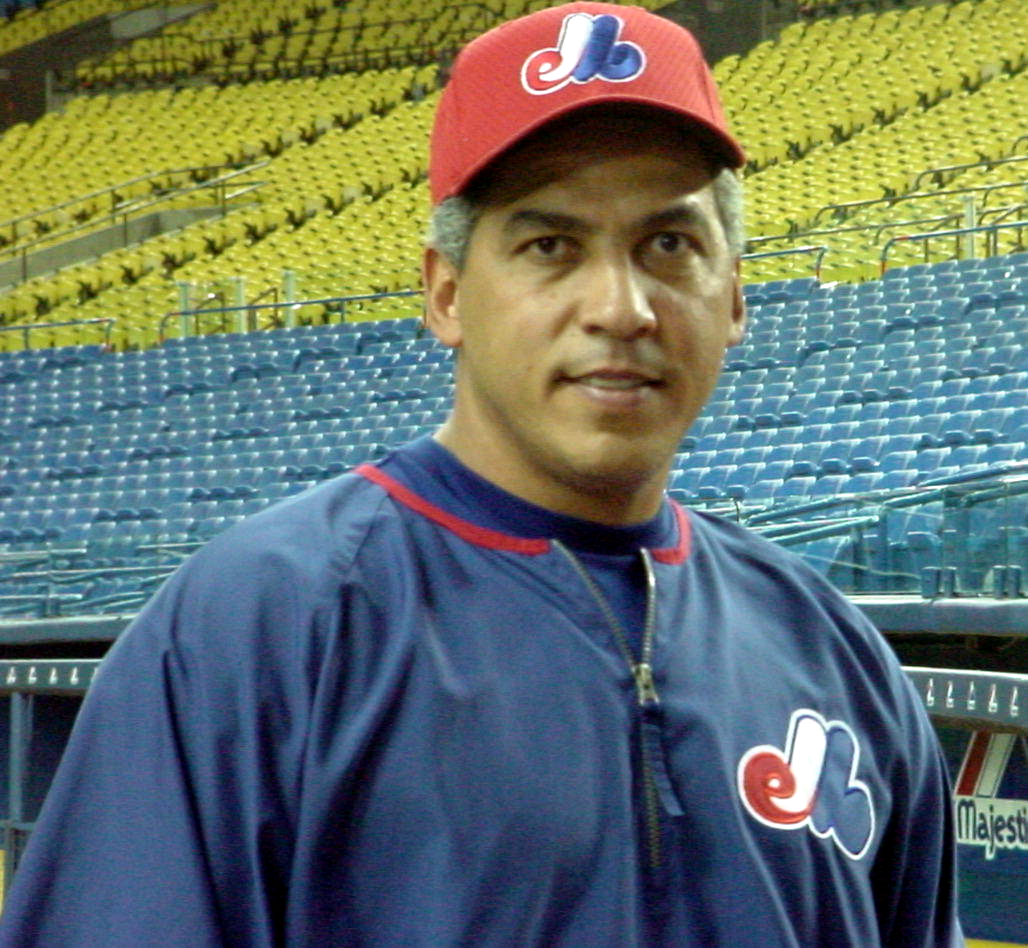
- Galarraga with the Montreal Expos in 2002
- First baseman
- Born: June 18, 1961 (age 65); Caracas, Venezuela
- Batted: Right Threw: Right

MLB debut
- August 23, 1985, for the Montreal Expos

Last MLB appearance
- October 3, 2004, for the Anaheim Angels

MLB statistics
- Batting average: .288
- Hits: 2,333
- Home runs: 399
- Runs batted in: 1,425
- Stats at Baseball Reference

Teams
- Montreal Expos (1985–1991); St. Louis Cardinals (1992); Colorado Rockies (1993–1997); Atlanta Braves (1998, 2000); Texas Rangers (2001); San Francisco Giants (2001); Montreal Expos (2002); San Francisco Giants (2003); Anaheim Angels (2004)

Career highlights and awards
- 5× All-Star (1988, 1993, 1997, 1998, 2000); 2× Gold Glove Award (1989, 1990); 2× Silver Slugger Award (1988, 1996); NL batting champion (1993); NL home run leader (1996); 2× NL RBI leader (1996, 1997)

Andrés José Padovani Galarraga (Spanish: [anˈdɾes ɣalaˈraɣa]; born June 18, 1961) is a Venezuelan former professional baseball first baseman who played 19 seasons in Major League Baseball (MLB) for the Montreal Expos, St. Louis Cardinals, Colorado Rockies, Atlanta Braves, Texas Rangers, San Francisco Giants and Anaheim Angels. He batted and threw right-handed. During his playing days, Galarraga stood 6 feet 3 inches (1.91 m) tall, weighing 235 pounds (107 kg).

Galarraga began his professional career in Venezuela at the age of 16. He was nicknamed "the Big Cat" (textually translated from English as El Gran Gato, although his nickname in his native Venezuela was El Gato) for his impressively quick reflexes and seamless defensive skills as a first baseman despite his large physical size. Galarraga was a five-time National League (NL) All-Star, won two NL Gold Glove Awards and two NL Silver Slugger Awards, and won two MLB Comeback Player of the Year Awards, the second time after returning to baseball after treatment for cancer.

== Career ==
=== Venezuelan Winter League ===
Galarraga was signed by the Leones del Caracas as a catcher and third baseman. He made his debut in the 1978–1979 season. Some of the players Galarraga had as teammates included big-leaguers Tony Armas, Bo Díaz, Manny Trillo, Gonzalo Márquez, and Leo Hernández. Galarraga originally started as a utility player, but three seasons later he became the regular first baseman of the team. At the recommendation of team manager Felipe Alou, he was signed by the Expos in 1979. At the time, some MLB scouts thought the 17-year-old power-hitting prodigy was too overweight to play professionally. Galarraga played with this team until 1993, when he retired from the Venezuelan Winter League.

=== Minor leagues ===
In Minor League Baseball (MiLB), Galarraga played for the West Palm Beach Expos (1979, 1982–1983), Calgary Expos (1979–1980), Jamestown Expos (1981), Jacksonville Suns (1984), and Indianapolis Indians (1985). Galarraga was named Double-A Southern League Most Valuable Player for Jacksonville in 1984, with a .289 batting average, 27 home runs and 87 runs batted in (RBI). He also led the league in total bases (271), slugging percentage (.508), intentional base on balls (10), hit by pitches (9), and in double plays (130) and total chances (1428) at first base. Prior to his major league promotion, Galarraga hit .269/25/85, in 121 games with Indianapolis, being named as the Triple-A International League (IL) Rookie of the Year.

=== Montreal Expos (1985–1991) ===
Galarraga made his debut with Montreal on August 23, 1985. During that season's last six-plus weeks, he struggled, hitting .187 (14-for-75), with two homers, and four RBI, in 24 games. Galarraga had a promising start in 1986, but it was interrupted, when he suffered a knee injury; at the time, he had already posted eight home runs and was leading all NL rookies with 25 runs batted in. Galarraga underwent arthroscopic knee surgery, on July 10. He was activated one month later, only to be re-injured the following day after pulling muscles in his rib cage. Galarraga returned to action in September, ending with .271, 10 home runs, and 42 RBI, in 105 games.

Galarraga with the Phillie Phanatic in 1987

Overshadowed by some teammates, Galarraga survived a tough rookie year and quietly enjoyed a consistently strong 1987 season. He hit .305 with 13 home runs, 90 RBI, and finishing second in the league in doubles (40). Despite his size, Galarraga displayed solid defense, being adept at scooping throws out of the dirt and excellent quickness turning the 3-6-3 double play. Cardinals' manager Whitey Herzog called him "the best-fielding right-handed first baseman I've seen since Gil Hodges."

In 1988, Galarraga emerged from the shadows to become the best player on the Expos. He had an MVP-caliber season with a .302 batting average, 99 runs, 29 home runs, and 92 RBI. Galarraga also led the league in hits (184) and doubles (42), and earned an All-Star berth for the first time in his career. He was named the Montreal Expos Player of the Year at the end of the season.

1989 was a rough season however for the Big Cat. Galarraga became a target of Montreal fans' frustration when he tailed off after the All-Star game. That year, Galarraga led the league in strikeouts (158), dropping his production to .257, 23 home runs, and 85 RBI. He fell five RBI short of becoming the first Expo to string together three straight seasons with 90 or more RBI. Despite the rough season, Galarraga blasted his first grand slam, stole home for the first time in his career, and was rewarded with a Gold Glove Award for his stellar play at first base.

Galarraga's 1990 season had Expos mumbling that the team should lower its expectations for the slick-fielding first baseman. For the second consecutive season, the Big Cat failed to repeat the standards he set in his first two full seasons. Galarraga hit .256 with 20 home runs and 87 RBI, almost a mirror image of his previous season. For the third consecutive year, he led the league in strikeouts; pitchers exploited Galarraga's impatience at the plate and didn't give him good pitches to hit. Even without any improvement with the bat, Galarraga continued to make tremendous contributions on the field, scooping up infielder's errant throws, starting 3-6-3 double plays, and winning his second Gold Glove. That season he also had a six-RBI game, two four-RBI games, and hit his first career inside-the-park home run.

Slowed by injuries, Galarraga struggled through the worst offensive season of his career in 1991. Disabled with a strained left hamstring between May and July, he later had arthroscopic surgery to repair damage to the undersurface of his left kneecap. Montreal missed Galarraga's glove as much as his bat, committing 43 infield errors in 53 games without him. That season, Galarraga hit .219, 9 home runs, and 33 RBI, in 107 games. He stole home for the second time in his career and hit his 100th career home run. At the end of the season, Galarraga was traded to the St. Louis Cardinals for starting pitcher Ken Hill.

=== St. Louis Cardinals (1992) ===
Galarraga had a second chance with the 1992 Cardinals; however, a pitch broke his wrist early in the season and he didn't recover until July. Galarraga batted .296 after the All-Star break and hit all ten of his homers after July 1 for a .497 second-half slugging percentage. He finished with a .243 batting average and 39 RBI, but made a good impression on Cardinals batting coach Don Baylor. When Baylor became the first Rockies manager in the off-season, he recommended that Colorado take a chance on Galarraga and sign him as a free agent.

=== Colorado Rockies (1993–1997) ===
==== National League batting champion (1993) ====
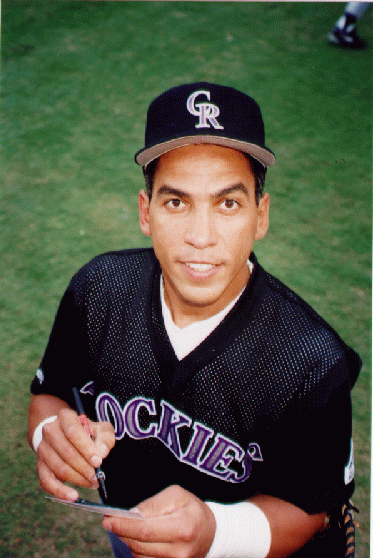
Galarraga with the Rockies in 1996

By joining the Rockies, Galarraga was given new life for his career. In a 1993 season full of remarkable individual achievements, he solidified his stature as an accomplished hitter, and flirted with the .400 mark for much of the season. Galarraga's final .370 batting average was a 127-point increase over his previous year mark. He led National League batters in batting average, and it was the highest average by a right-handed hitter since Joe DiMaggio batted .381 in 1939.

Despite missing 42 games with assorted injuries, The Big Cat compiled 56 multi-hit games to lead the league. He added 22 homers, 98 RBI, 71 runs, 35 doubles, four triples, a .403 on-base percentage, and his .602 slugging percentage was second in the league. Galarraga's .370 mark made him the first player on an expansion team as well as the first Venezuelan to win a batting title. Tony Gwynn hit .358 to finish as runner-up in the title race. Galarraga finished 10th in the MVP selection, but won The Sporting News Comeback Player of the Year Award. After the season, and for third time, he underwent arthroscopic knee surgery. In the strike-shortened 1994 season, Galarraga set a new National League record in April by driving in 30 runs in a month. He seemed to be on his way to a terrific year again, but he fractured his right hand on July 28. At the time of Galarraga's injury, Colorado had climbed to within a half-game of the first place Los Angeles Dodgers. Without him however, the Rockies went 3–10 the rest of the way. Galarraga paced the club with 31 homers (fifth in the league), and batted .319 with 85 RBI.

On June 25, 1995, Galarraga hit a home run in three consecutive innings to tie an MLB record. He finished the season hitting .280, with 31 homers, and 106 RBI. Galarraga's numbers were helped by the fact that he stayed healthy for the first time in four years. That season, the Rockies had four players with 30 or more home runs, matching the 1977 Dodgers. On August 29 of the same season, in a game against the Pittsburgh Pirates, Galarraga spoiled Paul Wagner's bid for a no-hitter, by singling with two out in the ninth; it was the only hit Wagner would allow in defeating the Rockies 4–0.

Over the next few seasons, Galarraga developed into one of the best RBI-men in baseball, driving in a combined 411 runs between 1996 and 1998 (150, 140, and 121). In the same period, he batted .304, .318, and .305, with 47, 41, and 44 home runs, respectively. Some critics argued that Galarraga's achievements were possible thanks to the thin-air, mile-high, hitter-friendly Coors Field, but he also belted many homers on the road that traveled over 450 feet (140 m).

==== NL RBI leader (1997) ====
Perhaps the most famous home run Galarraga hit was a mammoth grand slam off Kevin Brown on May 31, 1997, which landed 20 rows deep into the upper deck at Florida Marlins' Pro Player Stadium. It may also be his most debated home run, with a distance initially measured at 573 feet (175 m) and then changed to 529 feet (161 m). At the time, it set a record for both the Rockies and the stadium. In 2011, ESPN's Home Run Tracker recalculated the distance to 468 feet (143 m). But in 2017, the Baseball Research Journal published an analysis by Jose L. Lopez PhD, and Oscar A. Lopez PhD—professors of Engineering at the Central University of Venezuela—that concluded that Galarraga's home run travelled between 517.5 and 529.4 feet. This makes Galarraga's May 31, 1997 grand slam one of the few pre-Statcast home runs to have been proven to have traveled over 500 feet. Previously, Galarraga smashed two homers in two games that traveled 455-foot (139 m) and 451-foot (137 m) respectively, totaling 1,435 feet (437 m), an average of 478 feet (146 m) each.

The Rockies released Galarraga at the end of the season to make room at first base for prospect Todd Helton. At the time of his release, Galarraga was the club's all-time leader in home runs (172) and RBI (579). As a free agent, he signed a three-year contract with the Atlanta Braves.

=== Atlanta Braves (1998, 2000) ===
In Galarraga's first season in Atlanta (1998), he hit .305, with 44 home runs, and 121 RBI. This made him the first player in MLB history to hit 40 or more homers in consecutive seasons for two different teams. During 1999 spring training, Galarraga developed a sore back. Treatment from the team's trainers and team doctor included hydrobaths, massages, muscle relaxers, and stretching, but would not stop the nagging soreness. Galarraga was referred to a medical oncologist in Atlanta for a thorough physical exam and an MRI. On the second lumbar vertebra in his lower back, Galarraga had a tumor known as non-Hodgkin's lymphoma, a form of lymphatic cancer. He missed the entire 1999 season receiving chemotherapy treatments. Rockies third baseman and ex-teammate Vinny Castilla switched briefly from his traditional number 9 to number 14 on his jersey, to honor Galarraga's cancer fight.

In Spring 2000, Galarraga returned to the field after undergoing chemotherapy and a strict workout routine. In his third at-bat of opening day of the 2000 season, Galarraga gave the team the win with a go-ahead home run. In the months of April and May, he was tied for first place in home runs in the National League and he was batting .300. At the end of the season, Galarraga had batted .302, with 28 home runs, and 100 RBI. He was awarded his second National League Comeback Player of the Year Award by The Sporting News. Galarraga asked the Braves’ ownership for a two-year contract, but the most that the team would offer him was a one-year contract. He subsequently decided to become a free agent, and he later signed with the Texas Rangers, who were willing to offer Galarraga the two-year contract that he sought.

=== Rangers, Expos, and Giants (2001–2003) ===
The change of baseball leagues affected Galarraga badly in 2001. At age 40, he found himself "lost" in a different league, facing different pitchers, and stuck in a back-up position with the star Rafael Palmeiro as the main first baseman for the Texas Rangers. Galarraga was used mainly as a designated hitter (DH), as a pinch-hitter, and occasionally as a starter against left-handed pitchers. After a disappointing .235 batting average, 10 home runs, and 34 RBI, in 72 games, he was traded to the San Francisco Giants, at mid-season.

In 2002, Galarraga signed with the Expos for the full season. He then returned to the Giants in 2003, after signing a minor league contract, prior to the season. As a part-time player with the Giants, Galarraga batted .301, with 12 home runs, and 42 RBI.

=== Anaheim Angels (2004) ===
In 2004, Galarraga's cancer recurred and he underwent two three-week periods of chemotherapy and was hospitalized for 23 days for additional treatment. This was the same non-Hodgkin's lymphoma that had sidelined Galarraga in 1999, but he beat it for the second time and began play with the Anaheim Angels' Triple-A affiliate, the Salt Lake Stingers. When rosters were expanded in September, Galarraga came back to the major leagues. Although he served mostly as a bench player in Anaheim, Galarraga was highly regarded in the clubhouse, especially among younger players such as Vladimir Guerrero, for whom Galarraga became a voice of experience. He saw action in a few games, hitting one home run — the 399th and final home run of Galarraga's storied big league career.

=== New York Mets (2005) ===
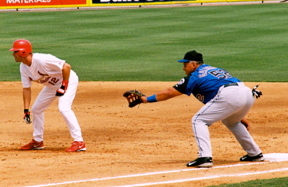
Galarraga (right) with the Mets during spring training in 2005

In 2005, Galarraga again found himself with a new team, the New York Mets, who had invited him to spring training, not knowing if the 43-year-old would be a good fit for their roster. Galarraga showed that he had some gas left in the tank offensively by socking three home runs, but appeared very tentative on the defensive end. Galarraga eventually retired during spring training on March 29, 2005, saying it was "the right time to give a younger guy a chance to play." He finished his career with a .288 batting average, 399 home runs, and 1,425 RBI. Galarraga ranked 36th all-time in career home runs at the time of his retirement.

== Highlights ==
- Led National League in Hits (184 in 1988)
- Led National League in Total Bases (329 in 1988)
- Led National League in Doubles (42 in 1988)
- Led National League in Runs Created (113 in 1988)
- Led National League in Extra-Base Hits (79 in 1988)
- Led National League in Batting average (.370 in 1993)
- Led National League in Home Runs (47 in 1996)
- Twice led National League in RBIs (150 in 1996 and 140 in 1997)
- Ranks 69th on MLB All-Time Total Bases List (4,038)
- Ranks 83rd on MLB All-Time Doubles List (444)
- Ranks 43rd on MLB All-Time Home Run List (399)
- Ranks 57th on MLB All-Time RBI List (1,425)
- Ranks 58th on MLB All-Time Extra-Base Hits List (875)
- Ranks 95th on MLB All-Time Intentional Walks List (106)
- Was inducted into the Colorado Sports Hall of Fame in 2007 (first Rockies Baseball Player to be inducted)
- Best Comeback Athlete ESPY Award 2001 (Atlanta Braves)
- The Sporting News Comeback Player of the Year Award winner 1993 (Colorado Rockies) 2001 (Atlanta Braves)
- First Rockies player ever represented at All-Star Game (1993)
- Rockies Career Leader in At Bats per Home Runs with 15.5.
- His 150 RBI season in 1996 is still a single season record for the Rockies.
- Won the three Triple Crown categories (BA, HR, RBI) although in different seasons
- Set Rockies record for RBI before the All-Star break (84 in 1997)
- Became the first player in history to win two NL Comeback Player of the Year Awards
- Honored in the docudrama movie Galarraga: puro béisbol (Galarraga: Nothing But Baseball – Venezuela, 2000)
- Honored in the book Andrés Galarraga – Real Life Reader Biography, by writer Sue Boulais (2003)
- Gained induction into the Venezuelan Baseball Hall of Fame and Museum (2010)

== See also ==
- List of athletes on Wheaties boxes
- List of Colorado Rockies team records
- List of Major League Baseball annual doubles leaders
- List of Major League Baseball career hits leaders
- List of Major League Baseball career home run leaders
- List of Major League Baseball career doubles leaders
- List of Major League Baseball career putouts leaders
- List of Major League Baseball career runs scored leaders
- List of Major League Baseball career runs batted in leaders
- List of Major League Baseball single-game hits leaders
- Venezuelan Baseball Hall of Fame and Museum

Preceded by Jeff Bagwell; Tony Gwynn	National League Player of the Month; June 1993; September 1993	Succeeded by Fred McGriff; Ellis Burks
