= Tom Martin (baseball) =

American baseball player (born 1970)

- Pitcher
- Born: May 21, 1970 (age 55); Charleston, South Carolina, U.S.
- Batted: Left Threw: Left

MLB debut
- April 2, 1997, for the Houston Astros

Last MLB appearance
- July 19, 2007, for the Colorado Rockies

MLB statistics
- Win–loss record: 11–9
- Earned run average: 4.92
- Strikeouts: 224
- Stats at Baseball Reference

Teams
- Houston Astros (1997); Cleveland Indians (1998–2000); New York Mets (2001); Tampa Bay Devil Rays (2002); Los Angeles Dodgers (2003–2004); Atlanta Braves (2004–2005); Colorado Rockies (2006–2007)

Thomas Edgar "Tombo" Martin (born May 21, 1970) is an American former Major League Baseball (MLB) relief pitcher. He batted and threw left-handed.

== Career ==
Martin was selected by the Baltimore Orioles in the sixth round of the 1988 Major League Baseball Draft. Martin was traded to the San Diego Padres on February 17, 1992 for Jim Lewis and Steve Martin. In the 1993 minor league draft, Martin was selected from the Padres by the Atlanta Braves where he made it as high as Triple-A before being released on January 25, 1995. On February 21, 1995, The Houston Astros signed him, where in 1997, Martin made his major league debut. He appeared in relief in 55 games that season with an impressive 2.09 ERA. The Arizona Diamondbacks selected Martin in the 1997 MLB Expansion Draft, but traded him to the Cleveland Indians along with Travis Fryman for Matt Williams thirteen days later. For the next three seasons, Martin would be up and down between the majors and minors, before he was traded to the New York Mets for Javier Ochoa on January 11, 2001. Becoming a free agent at the end of the season, Martin signed with the Tampa Bay Devil Rays, but was released on September 9, 2002.

On February 26, 2003, Martin signed with the Los Angeles Dodgers where he enjoyed success keeping his ERA under 4. On July 31, 2004, the day of the non-waiver trade deadline, the Dodgers traded Martin to the Atlanta Braves for Matt Merricks. Released by the Braves on April 14, 2005, he was signed by the team he made his major league debut for, the Houston Astros, but was released two and a half months later without appearing in a major league game. Martin signed with the Colorado Rockies on January 18, 2006, spending the entire year in the majors. After being released by the Rockies in July of 2007, Martin signed a minor league contract with an invitation to spring training with the Los Angeles Dodgers on January 26, 2008. He was released by the Dodgers on March 10.

On April 22, 2008, Martin signed with the Long Island Ducks of the independent Atlantic League. In 6 games, he had a 3.38 ERA and 6 strikeouts.

In January 2009, he signed a minor league contract with the New York Mets and was invited to spring training. On March 22, he was released due to a broken wrist. He re-signed a minor league contract on May 15. On June 23, 2009, Martin was released by the Mets.
