= John Hudek =

American baseball player (born 1966)

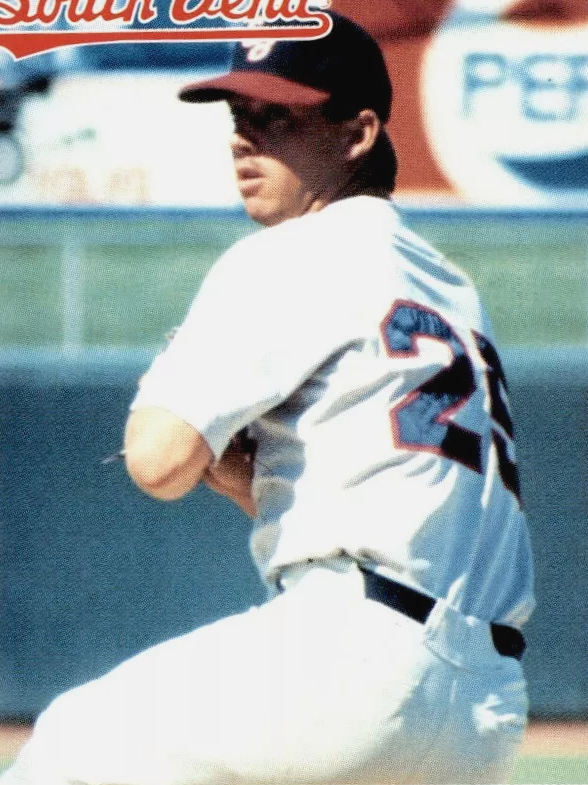
- Hudek with the South Bend White Sox in 1988
- Pitcher
- Born: August 8, 1966 (age 59); Tampa, Florida, U.S.
- Batted: Switch Threw: Right

MLB debut
- April 23, 1994, for the Houston Astros

Last MLB appearance
- September 30, 1999, for the Toronto Blue Jays

MLB statistics
- Win–loss record: 10–15
- Earned run average: 4.43
- Strikeouts: 206
- Stats at Baseball Reference

Teams
- Houston Astros (1994–1997); New York Mets (1998); Cincinnati Reds (1998–1999); Atlanta Braves (1999); Toronto Blue Jays (1999)

Career highlights and awards
- All-Star (1994)

John Raymond Hudek (born August 8, 1966) is an American former Major League Baseball pitcher. He played all or part of six seasons in the majors, from 1994 until 1999, for five different teams. He appeared in a total of 194 major league games, all in relief, making the 1994 NL All-Star team as a rookie. Once, in a game on September 5, 1997, he was tasked to pitch against Brian Johnson with runners on. With two strikes, catcher Tony Pena seemed to call for an intentional walk before Hudek threw a pitch in the middle of the zone for a strike that struck-out Johnson.
