= Ramón García (1990s pitcher) =

Venezuelan baseball player (born 1969)

- Pitcher
- Born: December 9, 1969 (age 56); Guanare, Portuguesa State, Venezuela
- Batted: Right Threw: Right

MLB debut
- May 31, 1991, for the Chicago White Sox

Last MLB appearance
- September 26, 1997, for the Houston Astros

MLB statistics
- Win–loss record: 17–16
- Earned run average: 4.84
- Strikeouts: 200
- Stats at Baseball Reference

Teams
- Chicago White Sox (1991); Milwaukee Brewers (1996); Houston Astros (1997)

Ramón Antonio García Fortunato (born December 9, 1969) is a Venezuelan former Major League Baseball right-handed pitcher.

== Career ==
He played for the Chicago White Sox (1991), Milwaukee Brewers (1996) and Houston Astros (1997).

In a three-season career, García compiled a 17–16 record with 200 strikeouts, five saves, and a 4.84 of earned run average in 95 appearances.

== See also ==
- List of players from Venezuela in Major League Baseball
