= John Burke (1990s pitcher) =

American baseball player (born 1970)

- Pitcher
- Born: February 9, 1970 (age 56); Durango, Colorado, U.S.
- Batted: Both Threw: Right

MLB debut
- August 13, 1996, for the Colorado Rockies

Last MLB appearance
- July 10, 1997, for the Colorado Rockies

MLB statistics
- Win–loss record: 4–6
- Earned run average: 6.75
- Strikeouts: 58
- Stats at Baseball Reference

Teams
- Colorado Rockies (1996–1997)

John Chandler Burke (born February 9, 1970) is an American former baseball player who was a pitcher for the Colorado Rockies of Major League Baseball (MLB) in 1996 and 1997.

== Early life ==
He was born in Durango, Colorado. He graduated from Cherry Creek High School in Greenwood Village (suburban Denver), where he was a standout high school baseball player for the Cherry Creek Bruins.

== College career ==
Burke accepted an athletic scholarship to attend the University of Florida in Gainesville, Florida, where he played for coach Joe Arnold's Florida Gators baseball team from 1990 to 1992. During his three seasons as a Gator, he set numerous team pitching records, including most career strikeouts and most career strikeouts per inning. He played in the 1991 College World Series, and was named a first-team All-American by Baseball America following the season. After his professional baseball career ended, he returned to the university and completed his bachelor's degree in anthropology in 2000.

== Professional career ==
Burke, who threw right-handed and was a switch hitter, was drafted a total of three times. In 1989, he was drafted by the Baltimore Orioles in the 34th round (867th overall). In 1991, he was drafted by the Houston Astros in the first round (6th). In 1992, the year he decided to sign with a team, he was drafted by the Colorado Rockies in the first round, 27th overall. Burke was the Colorado Rockies' first-ever amateur draft pick.

Burke, who combined a mid-90s fastball with a good curve and change-up, was primarily a starter in the minor leagues, where he had two really notable seasons. In 1993, with A-Advanced Central Valley, Burke went 7–8 with a 3.20 ERA and 114 strikeouts in 119 innings. In 1995 with AAA Colorado Springs, he went 7–1 with a 4.55 ERA. During 1995, Pacific Coast League managers voted Burke as the league's best pitching prospect and the pitcher with the best breaking pitch.

On August 13, 1996, Burke made his big league debut as a 26-year-old rookie. During his big league career, he appeared in a total of 28 games and had an ERA of 6.75. He had a record of 4 wins and 6 losses.

As a hitter, Burke hit .190 (4-21). He committed one error in the field.

Burke played his final game on July 10, 1997.

Currently, Burke lives in Littleton, Colorado.

== Honors and awards ==
- In 1993, he was a California League All-Star.

== See also ==
- 1991 College Baseball All-America Team
- List of Florida Gators baseball players
- List of University of Florida alumni
