= Rich Loiselle =

American baseball player (born 1972)

- Pitcher
- Born: January 12, 1972 (age 54); Neenah, Wisconsin, U.S.
- Batted: Right Threw: Right

MLB debut
- September 7, 1996, for the Pittsburgh Pirates

Last MLB appearance
- October 6, 2001, for the Pittsburgh Pirates

MLB statistics
- Win–loss record: 9–18
- Earned run average: 4.38
- Strikeouts: 178
- Saves: 49
- Stats at Baseball Reference

Teams
- Pittsburgh Pirates (1996–2001)

Richard Frank Loiselle (born January 12, 1972) is an American former professional baseball relief pitcher. He played in Major League Baseball (MLB) for the Pittsburgh Pirates from 1996 to 2001. Listed at 6' 5", 225 lb., Loiselle batted and threw right handed. He was born in Neenah, Wisconsin.

== Career ==
The San Diego Padres selected Loiselle in the 38th round of the 1991 MLB draft. He then spent five seasons in the Padres Minor League system.

In 1994, MLB cancelled the postseason due to a strike by the Major League Baseball Players Association. As a result, spring training for the 1995 season began with replacement players in camp, but management and players eventually resolved the dispute before regular season games were played. Nevertheless, Loiselle, along with dozens of players who agreed to serve as replacement players, were subsequently blacklisted by the MLBPA.

During the 1996 midseason, Loiselle was traded by San Diego along with Jeff Tabaka to the Houston Astros for Phil Plantier. A few days later, he was sent to the Pirates in exchange for Danny Darwin. Although Loiselle made his Major League debut with Pittsburgh in that season, he was one of dozens of players that never were allowed membership into the MLBPA for crossing the picket line.

His most productive season came in 1997, when he posted career numbers with a 3.10 ERA, 29 saves and 72 2/3 innings pitched.

During a game against the Milwaukee Brewers May 26, 1998, Loiselle was pitching in the bottom of the ninth when he hit Mike Matheny in the face with a pitch. Matheny proceeded to spit blood as he walked off the field.

In between, Loiselle pitched winter ball with the Navegantes del Magallanes club of the Venezuelan League in the 1995–96 season.
