= Kevin Foster (baseball) =

American baseball player (1969–2008)

- Pitcher
- Born: January 13, 1969; Evanston, Illinois, U.S.
- Died: October 11, 2008 (aged 39); Oklahoma City, Oklahoma, U.S.
- Batted: Right Threw: Right

MLB debut
- September 12, 1993, for the Philadelphia Phillies

Last MLB appearance
- August 21, 2001, for the Texas Rangers

MLB statistics
- Win–loss record: 32–30
- Earned Run Average: 4.86
- Strikeouts: 417
- Stats at Baseball Reference

Teams
- Philadelphia Phillies (1993); Chicago Cubs (1994–1998); Texas Rangers (2001)

Kevin Christopher Foster (January 13, 1969 – October 11, 2008) was an American professional baseball player who pitched 100 games in Major League Baseball (MLB) for the Philadelphia Phillies, Chicago Cubs and Texas Rangers in all or parts of seven seasons between 1993 and 2001. He threw and batted right-handed, stood 6 feet 1 inch (1.85 m) tall and weighed 160 pounds (73 kg).

Foster was born in Evanston, Illinois, where he graduated from Evanston Township High School, and attended Kishwaukee College.

== Career ==
He was selected by the Montreal Expos in the 29th round of the 1987 Major League Baseball draft, and debuted with two September 1993 games as a late-season call-up for the Phillies. The following spring, he was traded to the Cubs, where appeared in 89 of his 100 MLB games, with 82 starts, and posted all 32 of his career wins. In one of his starts, Foster picked up the Cubs’ first victory against the Chicago White Sox in interleague play, an 8–3 triumph at Comiskey Park on June 16, 1997. Exactly one year later, Foster worked in his last game as a Cub before returning to the minor leagues. His last MLB trial came during July and August 2001 as a relief pitcher for the Texas Rangers.

As a major leaguer, Foster posted a career 32–30 won–lost record and 4.86 earned run average, with two complete games. In 5092/3 innings pitched, he allowed 500 hits and 220 bases on balls, with 417 strikeouts. He later played for the independent St. Paul Saints of the Northern League in 2003 and 2004.

== Death ==
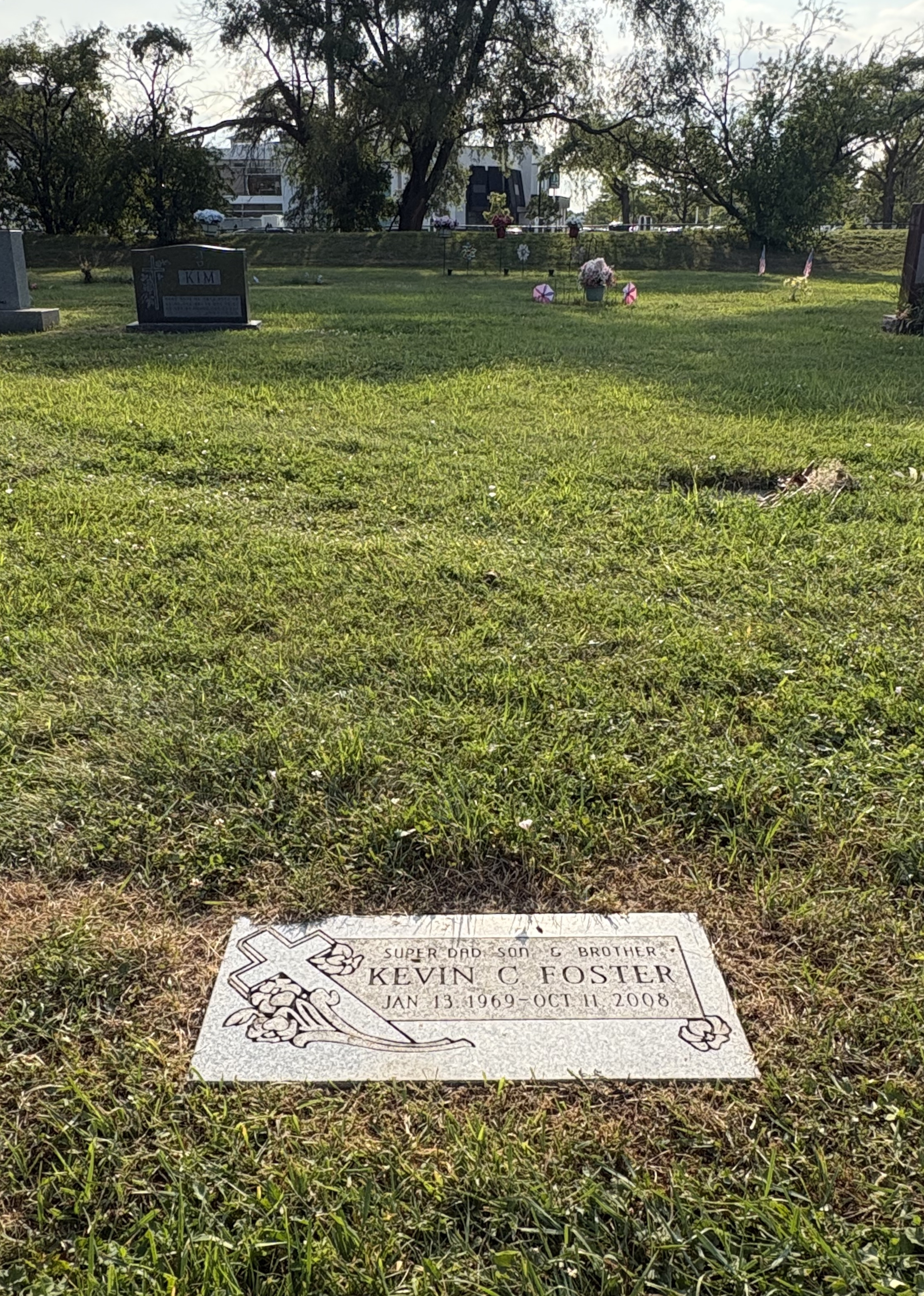
Foster's grave at Memorial Park Cemetery

Foster died of renal cancer on October 11, 2008, in Oklahoma City, Oklahoma. He was buried at Memorial Park Cemetery in Skokie, Illinois.
