= Jeff Shaw =

American baseball player (born 1966)

- Pitcher
- Born: July 7, 1966 (age 58); Washington Court House, Ohio, U.S.
- Batted: Right Threw: Right

MLB debut
- April 30, 1990, for the Cleveland Indians

Last MLB appearance
- October 6, 2001, for the Los Angeles Dodgers

MLB statistics
- Win–loss record: 34–54
- Earned run average: 3.54
- Strikeouts: 545
- Saves: 203
- Stats at Baseball Reference

Teams
- Cleveland Indians (1990–1992); Montreal Expos (1993–1995); Chicago White Sox (1995); Cincinnati Reds (1996–1998); Los Angeles Dodgers (1998–2001)

Career highlights and awards
- 2× All-Star (1998, 2001); NL Rolaids Relief Man Award (1997); NL saves leader (1997)

Jeffrey Lee Shaw (born July 7, 1966) is an American former professional baseball relief pitcher, who played in Major League Baseball (MLB) for the Cleveland Indians and Chicago White Sox of the American League (AL), and the Montreal Expos, Cincinnati Reds, and Los Angeles Dodgers of the National League (NL), during a 12-year career from 1990 to 2001. He is the father of MLB infielder Travis Shaw.

== Amateur career ==
Shaw started his baseball career at Washington Senior High School, located in Washington Court House, Ohio. While he was enrolled at the University of Rio Grande, he attended a tryout camp for the Cincinnati Reds during the summer of 1985, where he received little attention. He and his mother then drove to Columbus, Ohio to try out with the New York Yankees at the home field of New York's Triple-A affiliate, the Columbus Clippers. He drew the interest of scouts by upping the speed on his fastball from 84–85 miles per hour (135–137 km/h) to 93 miles per hour (150 km/h) while he played in a semi-professional league in Washington Court House. Shaw played for Cuyahoga Community College-West, but transferred to Cuyahoga Community College to be eligible for the draft. Shaw was selected by the Cleveland Indians with the first pick of the opening round of the January 1986 amateur draft, signing on May 11, 1986.

== Professional career ==
Shaw first pitched professionally during 1986 for the Batavia Trojans, a Class A Short Season affiliate of Cleveland. He rose through their farm system, reaching Double-A in 1988 with the Williamsport Bills and Triple-A in 1990 with the Colorado Springs Sky Sox.

Shaw made his major-league debut on April 30, 1990. He played three seasons with Cleveland, then became a free agent.

In November 1992, Shaw signed with the Kansas City Royals, who traded him the following month to the Montreal Expos in a multi-player deal. Shaw then played for Montreal during the 1993–1995 seasons. In August 1995, Montreal traded Shaw to the Chicago White Sox in exchange for pitcher José DeLeón. After finishing the season with the White Sox, Shaw again became a free agent.

In January 1996, Shaw signed with the Cincinnati Reds, allowing him to commute to the ballpark from his home in Washington Court House. He played for the Reds until July 1998, when he was traded to the Los Angeles Dodgers. Shaw played another three seasons before retiring; his final MLB appearance was on October 6, 2001.

=== Trade to the Dodgers ===
On July 4, 1998, the Reds traded Shaw to the Dodgers for Paul Konerko and Dennys Reyes. This trade was not what Shaw wanted. He had signed a three-year extension (to begin in 1999) with the Reds after the 1997 season. Though he could have negotiated for a higher rate elsewhere, he was willing to sign a contract with the Reds at a discount since he could live at his home in Washington Court House. Shaw's agent stated they asked Reds general manager Jim Bowden for a no-trade clause, but he would not agree to one.

Shaw was asked during a Reds game to leave the dugout to take a call from Bowden, and was told he was being traded. Learning it was to the Dodgers, Shaw said it was "the farthest place from Washington Court House." Because Shaw had so recently signed a long-term contract, he was entitled to ask for a trade. To keep Shaw, Dodgers general manager Kevin Malone ended up spending more than he bargained for, signing Shaw to a three-year, $15 million contract making him the second-highest paid closer in the league. Shaw's wife and children subsequently moved out to California with him.

=== Career summary ===
Shaw received many accolades and awards during his career. In 1997, he won the Rolaids Relief Man Award for the National League, as he led the league with 42 saves and recorded a 2.38 earned run average (ERA). He was also selected to the National League All-Star team twice, once in 1998 and again in 2001. He was selected in 1998 as a member of the Cincinnati Reds, but was traded to the Los Angeles Dodgers at the beginning of the All-Star break, thus his first game he pitched as a Dodger was in the 1998 All-Star Game. Shaw featured a split-finger fastball as his strikeout pitch.

== Family ==
Shaw is married with three children. His son, Travis Shaw, also became an MLB player.

== See also ==
- List of Major League Baseball annual saves leaders
