= Jeff McCurry =

American baseball player (born 1970)

- Pitcher
- Born: January 21, 1970 (age 56); Tokyo, Japan
- Batted: Right Threw: Right

MLB debut
- May 6, 1995, for the Pittsburgh Pirates

Last MLB appearance
- June 22, 1999, for the Houston Astros

MLB statistics
- Win–loss record: 3–12
- Earned run average: 5.89
- Strikeouts: 60
- Stats at Baseball Reference

Teams
- Pittsburgh Pirates (1995, 1998); Detroit Tigers (1996); Colorado Rockies (1997); Houston Astros (1999)

Jeffrey Dee McCurry (born January 21, 1970) is an American former professional baseball pitcher. He appeared in parts of five seasons at the Major League Baseball (MLB) for the Pittsburgh Pirates, Detroit Tigers, Colorado Rockies, and Houston Astros.

== Playing career ==
McCurry was drafted by the Pirates in the 14th round of the 1990 MLB draft. He did not sign a contract with Pittsburgh until May 25, 1991. He made his professional debut with their Rookie league Gulf Coast Pirates and Class A (Short Season) Welland Pirates in 1991. McCurry recorded a 2.57 ERA in 6 games with the GCL Pirates and an 0.57 ERA in 9 appearances with Welland.

McCurry split the 1992 season between the Class A Augusta Pirates and the Class A-Advanced Salem Buccaneers. He recorded a 3.30 ERA in 19 outings with Augusta. In 30 games with Salem, he recorded a 6–2 record and an earned run average of 2.87 over 62.2 innings. In 1993, McCurry made 41 appearances for Salem and tallied a 1–4 record and a 3.89 ERA. He also appeared in 23 games for the Class AA Carolina Mudcats, recording a 2.79 ERA in 29 innings. He spent the entire 1994 season with Carolina. Appearing in 48 games, McCurry totaled a 6–5 record and a 3.21 ERA in 81.1 innings.

== Post–playing career ==
McCurry now coaches baseball at St. Thomas High School in Houston, Texas.

== See also ==
- List of Major League Baseball players from Japan
