= Mike Magnante =

American baseball player (born 1965)

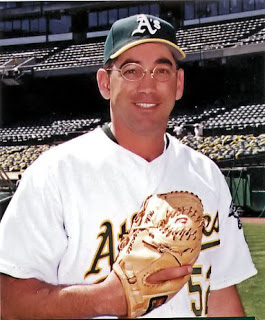
- Pitcher
- Born: June 17, 1965 (age 60); Glendale, California, U.S.
- Batted: Left Threw: Left

MLB debut
- April 22, 1991, for the Kansas City Royals

Last MLB appearance
- July 29, 2002, for the Oakland Athletics

MLB statistics
- Win–loss record: 26–32
- Earned run average: 4.08
- Strikeouts: 347
- Stats at Baseball Reference

Teams
- Kansas City Royals (1991–1996); Houston Astros (1997–1998); Anaheim Angels (1999); Oakland Athletics (2000–2002)

Michael Anthony Magnante (/məɡˈnænti/; Italian pronunciation: [maɲˈɲante];) born June 17, 1965, is an American former professional baseball pitcher. He played 12 seasons in Major League Baseball as a left-handed relief pitcher for four teams.

Magnante was born in Glendale, California, and attended school in neighboring Burbank, California. He won three games during his senior year at John Burroughs High School, before attending college at UCLA. Magnante got a position on the UCLA baseball team as a walk on and was described as mediocre; but an injury on the basketball court in 1985 changed that. Determined to come back from the injury, things were different went he pitched after that. "At the very end of the season at UCLA, I got angry at myself and angry at my coaches and I went out to the mound mad at everything and said, ‘OK, let’s see if you can hit the fastball.’ And I just threw as hard as I could. It was the first time I’d ever done that. And they didn’t hit it."

Magnante was drafted in 1988 by the Kansas City Royals and by 1991 had a record of 6-1 with an ERA of 3.02. He had six seasons with the Royals before joining the Astros in 1997.

On August 22, 1997, Magnante pitched an immaculate inning by striking out three batters on nine pitches in the ninth inning of a 6–3 win over the Cincinnati Reds. Magnante became the 20th National League pitcher and the 29th pitcher in major league history to accomplish the feat.

In 2002, the Oakland Athletics released Magnante four days before reaching 10 years of MLB service time and fully vesting his pension, because of the acquisition of Ricardo Rincón. This moment is depicted in the film Moneyball (though his pension is not mentioned in the film). As of 2020, he is a math teacher at Agoura High School.
