= Roger Bailey (baseball) =

American baseball player (born 1970)

- Pitcher
- Born: October 3, 1970 (age 55); Chattahoochee, Florida, U.S.
- Batted: Right Threw: Right

MLB debut
- April 27, 1995, for the Colorado Rockies

Last MLB appearance
- September 24, 1997, for the Colorado Rockies

MLB statistics
- Win–loss record: 18–19
- Earned run average: 4.90
- Strikeouts: 162
- Stats at Baseball Reference

Teams
- Colorado Rockies (1995–1997)

Charles Roger Bailey (born October 3, 1970) is an American former Major League Baseball right-handed pitcher who played for the Colorado Rockies from 1995 to 1997.

A native of Chattahoochee, Florida, Bailey attended Chattahoochee High School, and is an alumnus of Florida State University. In 1991, he played collegiate summer baseball with the Brewster Whitecaps of the Cape Cod Baseball League.

He was selected by the Rockies in the 3rd round of the 1992 MLB draft. He made his Major League Baseball debut with Colorado on April 27, 1995, and appeared in his final game on September 24, 1997.
