= 1997 Atlanta Braves season =

1997 Atlanta Braves
- National League East champions
- League: National League
- Division: East
- Ballpark: Turner Field
- City: Atlanta
- Record: 101–61 (.623)
- Divisional place: 1st
- Owners: Time Warner
- General managers: John Schuerholz
- Managers: Bobby Cox
- Television: WTBS; TBS Superstation (Pete Van Wieren, Skip Caray, Don Sutton, Joe Simpson); SportSouth (Tim Brando, Ernie Johnson, Bob Rathbun)
- Radio: WSB (AM) (Pete Van Wieren, Skip Caray, Don Sutton, Joe Simpson)

The 1997 Atlanta Braves season marked the franchise's 32nd season in Atlanta and 127th overall. The Braves entered the season as defending National League champions, having lost the 1996 World Series to the Yankees in 6 games. They won their seventh consecutive division title, taking the National League East by 9 games over the second place Florida Marlins. However, the Marlins defeated the Braves in the NLCS. 1997 was the first year that the Braves played their home games in Turner Field, a reconstruction of the former Centennial Olympic Stadium, which originally served as the main venue for the 1996 Summer Olympics.

== Off season ==
- November 20, 1996: John Smoltz was signed as a free agent with the Atlanta Braves.
- November 25, 1996: Paul Byrd was traded by the New York Mets with a player to be named later to the Atlanta Braves for Greg McMichael. The New York Mets sent Andy Zwirchitz (minors) (May 25, 1997) to the Atlanta Braves to complete the trade.
- December 19, 1996: Mike Bielecki was signed as a free agent with the Atlanta Braves.
- March 25, 1997: Kenny Lofton was traded by the Cleveland Indians with Alan Embree to the Atlanta Braves for Marquis Grissom and David Justice.

== Regular season ==
The first game at Turner Field took place on April 4, 1997, with Denny Neagle making the start for the Braves.

=== Opening day starters ===
- Kenny Lofton – CF
- Mark Lemke – 2B
- Chipper Jones – 3B
- Fred McGriff – 1B
- Ryan Klesko – LF
- Michael Tucker – RF
- Javy López – C
- Jeff Blauser – SS
- John Smoltz – P

=== Season standings ===
NL East
Team	W	L	Pct.	GB	Home	Road
Atlanta Braves	101	61	.623	—	50‍–‍31	51‍–‍30
Florida Marlins	92	70	.568	9	52‍–‍29	40‍–‍41
New York Mets	88	74	.543	13	50‍–‍31	38‍–‍43
Montreal Expos	78	84	.481	23	45‍–‍36	33‍–‍48
Philadelphia Phillies	68	94	.420	33	38‍–‍43	30‍–‍51

=== Record vs. opponents ===
1997 National League record Source: MLB Standings Grid – 1997
Team	ATL	CHC	CIN	COL	FLA	HOU	LAD	MON	NYM	PHI	PIT	SD	SF	STL	AL
Atlanta	—	9–2	9–2	5–6	4–8	7–4	6–5	10–2	5–7	10–2	5–6	8–3	7–4	8–3	8–7
Chicago	2–9	—	7–5	2–9	2–9	3–9	5–6	4–7	6–5	6–5	7–5	6–5	5–6	4–8	9–6
Cincinnati	2–9	5–7	—	5–6	5–6	5–7	6–5	6–5	2–9	8–3	8–4	5–6	4–7	6–6	9–6
Colorado	6–5	9–2	6–5	—	7–4	5–6	5–7	7–4	6–5	4–7	4–7	4–8	4–8	7–4	9–7
Florida	8–4	9–2	6–5	4–7	—	7–4	7–4	7–5	4–8	6–6	7–4	5–6	5–6	5–6	12–3
Houston	4–7	9–3	7–5	6–5	4–7	—	7–4	8–3	7–4	4–7	6–6	6–5	3–8	9–3	4–11
Los Angeles	5–6	6–5	5–6	7–5	4–7	4–7	—	7–4	6–5	10–1	9–2	5–7	6–6	5–6	9–7
Montreal	2–10	7–4	5–6	4–7	5–7	3–8	4–7	—	5–7	6–6	5–6	8–3	6–5	6–5	12–3
New York	7–5	5–6	9–2	5–6	8–4	4–7	5–6	7–5	—	7–5	7–4	5–6	3–8	9–2	7–8
Philadelphia	2–10	5–6	3–8	7–4	6–6	7–4	1–10	6–6	5–7	—	5–6	7–4	3–8	6–5	5–10
Pittsburgh	6–5	5–7	4–8	7–4	4–7	6–6	2–9	6–5	4–7	6–5	—	5–6	8–3	9–3	7–8
San Diego	3–8	5–6	6–5	8–4	6–5	5–6	7–5	3–8	6–5	4–7	6–5	—	4–8	5–6	8–8
San Francisco	4–7	6–5	7–4	8–4	6–5	8–3	6–6	5–6	8–3	8–3	3–8	8–4	—	3–8	10–6
St. Louis	3–8	8–4	6–6	4–7	6–5	3–9	6–5	5–6	2–9	5–6	3–9	6–5	8–3	—	8–7

=== Roster ===
1997 Atlanta Braves
**Roster**
**Pitchers**: 26 Mike Bielecki; 50 Joe Borowski; 49 Chris Brock; 45 Paul Byrd; 38 Mike Cather; 30 Brad Clontz; 32 Alan Embree; 40 Chad Fox; 47 Tom Glavine; 50 John LeRoy; 46 Kerry Ligtenberg; 31 Greg Maddux; 34 Kevin Millwood; 15 Denny Neagle; 29 John Smoltz; 36 Terrell Wade; 43 Mark Wohlers	**Catchers**: 8 Javy López; 48 Greg Myers; 12 Eddie Pérez; 9 Tim Spehr; **Infielders**: 2 Rafael Belliard; 4 Jeff Blauser; 23 Greg Colbrunn; 11 Ed Giovanola; 14 Tony Graffanino; 10 Chipper Jones; 20 Mark Lemke; 1 Keith Lockhart; 27 Fred McGriff; 16 Mike Mordecai; 33 Randall Simon	**Outfielders**: 17 Danny Bautista; 19 Tommy Gregg; 25 Andruw Jones; 18 Ryan Klesko; 7 Kenny Lofton; 24 Michael Tucker	**Manager**: 6 Bobby Cox; **Coaches**: 37 Jim Beauchamp (bench); 39 Pat Corrales (third base); 22 Bobby Dews (first base); 28 Clarence Jones (hitting); 54 Leo Mazzone (pitching); 42 Ned Yost (bullpen)

=== Game log ===
1997 Game Log: 101–61 (Home: 50–31; Away: 51–30)
April: 19–6 (Home: 12–2; Away: 7–4)

#	Date	Opponent	Score	Win	Loss	Save	Attendance	Record
1	April 1	@ Astros	1–2	Reynolds (1–0)	**Smoltz** (0–1)	Wagner (1)	44,618	0–1
2	April 2	@ Astros	3–4	Hampton (1–0)	**Maddux** (0–1)	Wagner (2)	16,308	0–2
3	April 3	@ Astros	3–2	**Glavine** (1–0)	Kile (0–1)	**Wohlers** (1)	17,963	1–2
4	April 4	Cubs	5–4	**Clontz** (1–0)	Adams (0–1)	**Wohlers** (2)	45,044	2–2
–	April 5	Cubs	Suspended (rain); completed April 6 (Note: Game was suspended in the bottom of the 7th with the Braves leading 8–5.)					
5	April 6	Cubs	11–5	**Smoltz** (1–1)	Casian (0–1)	—	45,698	3–2
6	April 6	Cubs	4–0	**Maddux** (1–1)	Mulholland (0–2)	—	41,318	4–2
7	April 8	Astros	4–2	**Glavine** (2–0)	Hampton (1–1)	**Wohlers** (3)	31,064	5–2
8	April 9	Astros	4–3 (12)	**Embree** (1–0)	Lima (0–1)	—	33,986	6–2
9	April 10	Astros	3–5	Holt (1–0)	**Smoltz** (1–2)	Hudek (1)	33,637	6–3
–	April 11	@ Cubs	Postponed (snow); rescheduled for July 22					
10	April 12	@ Cubs	2–1	**Bielecki** (1–0)	Patterson (0–1)	**Wohlers** (4)	23,944	7–3
11	April 13	@ Cubs	6–4	**Clontz** (2–0)	Wendell (0–1)	**Wohlers** (5)	21,244	8–3
12	April 14	Reds	15–5	**Neagle** (1–0)	Schourek (0–2)	—	31,427	9–3
13	April 15	Reds	3–0	**Smoltz** (2–2)	Mercker (1–1)	—	31,962	10–3
14	April 16	Reds	7–1	**Byrd** (1–0)	Smiley (1–3)	—	38,411	11–3
15	April 18	@ Rockies	14–0	**Glavine** (3–0)	Wright (2–1)	—	48,070	12–3
16	April 19	@ Rockies	8–7	**Neagle** (2–0)	Ritz (1–3)	**Bielecki** (1)	48,065	13–3
17	April 20	@ Rockies	2–9	Holmes (1–0)	**Smoltz** (2–3)	—	48,155	13–4
18	April 22	@ Giants	4–0	**Maddux** (2–1)	Van Landingham (1–1)	—	18,404	14–4
19	April 23	@ Giants	3–4	Henry (2–0)	**Embree** (1–1)	—	17,050	14–5
20	April 25	Padres	5–4	**Neagle** (3–0)	Cunnane (0–1)	**Wohlers** (6)	43,376	15–5
21	April 26	Padres	3–2 (10)	**Wohlers** (1–0)	Hoffman (0–1)	—	45,473	16–5
22	April 27	Padres	2–0 (5)	**Maddux** (3–1)	Valenzuela (1–3)	—	36,399	17–5
23	April 28	Dodgers	14–0	**Glavine** (4–0)	Martinez (2–2)	—	28,357	18–5
24	April 29	Dodgers	2–6	Park (1–1)	**Wade** (0–1)	—	35,442	18–6
25	April 30	@ Reds	12–3	**Neagle** (4–0)	Mercker (1–3)	—	18,278	19–6

May: 17–11 (Home: 8–6; Away: 9–5)

#	Date	Opponent	Score	Win	Loss	Save	Attendance	Record
26	May 1	@ Reds	4–2	**Smoltz** (3–3)	Burba (3–3)	**Wohlers** (7)	19,991	20–6
27	May 2	Pirates	2–3	Peters (1–0)	**Bielecki** (1–1)	Loiselle (1)	37,577	20–7
28	May 3	Pirates	0–3	Loaiza (3–0)	**Glavine** (4–1)	Rincon (2)	46,602	20–8
29	May 4	Pirates	3–1	**Wade** (1–1)	Cordova (1–3)	**Wohlers** (8)	42,037	21–8
30	May 5	@ Cardinals	2–1	**Neagle** (5–0)	Al. Benes (3–3)	**Wohlers** (9)	26,113	22–8
31	May 6	@ Cardinals	3–4	Mathews (1–1)	**Bielecki** (1–2)	Eckersley (7)	28,620	22–9
32	May 7	@ Marlins	3–2 (10)	**Byrd** (2–0)	Powell (0–1)	**Bielecki** (2)	26,838	23–9
33	May 8	@ Marlins	1–5	Saunders (1–1)	**Glavine** (4–2)	—	32,088	23–10
34	May 9	@ Pirates	0–9	Cordova (2–3)	**Wade** (1–2)	—	18,006	23–11
35	May 10	@ Pirates	9–3	**Neagle** (6–0)	Lieber (1–4)	—	34,143	24–11
36	May 11	@ Pirates	8–2	**Smoltz** (4–3)	Cooke (3–4)	—	29,895	25–11
37	May 12	@ Pirates	10–2	**Maddux** (4–1)	Schmidt (1–2)	—	12,114	26–11
38	May 13	Marlins	5–11	Saunders (2–1)	**Wade** (1–3)	—	38,365	26–12
39	May 14	Marlins	3–4	Brown (4–2)	**Bielecki** (1–3)	Nen (10)	38,902	26–13
40	May 16	Cardinals	1–0 (13)	**Borowski** (1–0)	Frascatore (2–2)	—	46,626	27–13
41	May 17	Cardinals	11–6	**Smoltz** (5–3)	Morris (1–2)	—	48,366	28–13
42	May 18	Cardinals	5–1	**Glavine** (5–2)	An. Benes (2–2)	—	35,046	29–13
43	May 19	Cardinals	7–3	**Neagle** (7–0)	Stottlemyre (2–3)	—	33,497	30–13
44	May 20	Expos	4–2	**Wade** (2–3)	Hermanson (1–3)	**Wohlers** (10)	38,278	31–13
45	May 21	Expos	3–2	**Maddux** (5–1)	Urbina (2–3)	—	41,528	32–13
46	May 23	@ Dodgers	4–2	**Smoltz** (6–3)	Astacio (3–3)	**Wohlers** (11)	38,735	33–13
47	May 24	@ Dodgers	3–10	Martinez (4–3)	**Glavine** (5–3)	—	49,074	33–14
48	May 25	@ Dodgers	0–2	Valdez (3–5)	**Neagle** (7–1)	To. Worrell (13)	40,417	33–15
49	May 26	@ Padres	12–5	**Borowski** (2–0)	Ti. Worrell (2–6)	—	17,265	34–15
50	May 27	@ Padres	9–2	**Maddux** (6–1)	Hamilton (3–2)	—	18,231	35–15
51	May 29	Giants	2–4	Estes (7–2)	**Smoltz** (6–4)	Beck (16)	38,844	35–16
52	May 30	Giants	3–2	**Wohlers** (2–0)	Henry (2–1)	—	45,181	36–16
53	May 31	Giants	4–6	Poole (2–0)	**Borowski** (2–1)	Beck (17)	46,445	36–17

June: 16–12 (Home: 5–5; Away: 11–7)

#	Date	Opponent	Score	Win	Loss	Save	Attendance	Record
54	June 1	Giants	4–3	**Bielecki** (2–3)	Poole (2–1)	**Wohlers** (12)	46,501	37–17
55	June 2	Padres	4–5	Murray (1–0)	**Maddux** (6–2)	Hoffman (9)	33,659	37–18
56	June 3	Padres	2–5	Smith (1–0)	**Wohlers** (2–1)	Hoffman (10)	41,902	37–19
57	June 4	@ Expos	6–3	**Glavine** (6–3)	Juden (5–2)	—	16,429	38–19
58	June 5	@ Expos	9–0	**Neagle** (8–1)	Hermanson (2–4)	—	12,212	39–19
59	June 6	@ Giants	9–5	**Byrd** (3–0)	Roa (1–4)	—	16,948	40–19
60	June 7	@ Giants	5–2	**Maddux** (7–2)	Henry (2–2)	**Wohlers** (13)	30,440	41–19
61	June 8	@ Giants	3–5	Poole (3–1)	**Smoltz** (6–5)	Beck (19)	36,689	41–20
62	June 9	@ Rockies	3–8	Bailey (6–5)	**Glavine** (6–4)	—	48,047	41–21
63	June 10	@ Rockies	8–3	**Neagle** (9–1)	Ritz (5–5)	—	48,103	42–21
64	June 11	@ Rockies	6–9	Thomson (2–4)	**Clontz** (2–1)	—	48,633	42–22
65	June 13	Orioles	3–4	Key (11–1)	**Maddux** (7–3)	Myers (21)	48,334	42–23
66	June 14	Orioles	4–6 (12)	Rhodes (4–2)	**Borowski** (2–2)	Myers (22)	47,344	42–24
67	June 15	Orioles	3–5 (10)	Mathews (1–1)	**Wohlers** (2–2)	Myers (23)	48,088	42–25
68	June 16	@ Blue Jays	3–0	**Neagle** (10–1)	Clemens (11–2)	—	34,409	43–25
69	June 17	@ Blue Jays	8–7	**Maddux** (8–3)	Andujar (0–3)	**Wohlers** (14)	31,356	44–25
70	June 18	@ Blue Jays	3–5	Williams (2–6)	**Smoltz** (6–6)	Timlin (6)	31,717	44–26
71	June 20	@ Phillies	4–1	**Glavine** (7–4)	Leiter (4–8)	—	20,648	45–26
72	June 21	@ Phillies	9–8	**Clontz** (3–1)	Blazier (0–1)	**Wohlers** (15)	24,309	46–26
73	June 22	@ Phillies	12–5	**Maddux** (9–3)	Stephenson (2–3)	—	25,534	47–26
74	June 23	@ Mets	2–3	Reed (5–4)	**Smoltz** (6–7)	—	22,193	47–27
75	June 24	@ Mets	5–6	McMichael (4–6)	**Wohlers** (2–3)	—	26,663	47–28
76	June 25	@ Mets	14–7	**Glavine** (8–4)	Jones (12–4)	—	27,980	48–28
77	June 26	Phillies	5–4	**Neagle** (11–1)	Beech (0–3)	**Wohlers** (16)	41,762	49–28
78	June 27	Phillies	7–1	**Maddux** (10–3)	Stephenson (2–4)	—	48,234	50–28
79	June 28	Phillies	9–1	**Smoltz** (7–7)	Schilling (9–7)	—	48,557	51–28
80	June 29	Phillies	6–5	**Bielecki** (3–3)	Brewer (0–1)	**Wohlers** (17)	47,902	52–28
81	June 30	@ Yankees	0–1 (10)	Stanton (5–0)	**Bielecki** (3–4)	—	39,887	52–29

July: 17–11 (Home: 9–6; Away: 8–5)

#	Date	Opponent	Score	Win	Loss	Save	Attendance	Record
82	July 1	@ Yankees	3–1	**Neagle** (12–1)	Mendoza (3–3)	**Wohlers** (18)	39,596	53–29
83	July 2	@ Yankees	2–0	**Maddux** (11–3)	Gooden (3–1)	—	36,606	54–29
84	July 3	@ Expos	15–2	**Smoltz** (8–7)	Bullinger (5–8)	—	18,064	55–29
85	July 4	@ Expos	6–3	**Clontz** (4–1)	Urbina (2–6)	**Wohlers** (19)	19,939	56–29
86	July 5	@ Expos	5–3	**Glavine** (9–4)	Martinez (10–4)	**Wohlers** (20)	24,788	57–29
87	July 6	@ Expos	2–6	Juden (11–2)	**Neagle** (12–2)	—	21,316	57–30
**68th All-Star Game in Cleveland, Ohio**
88	July 10	Mets	7–10	McMichael (5–6)	**Bielecki** (3–5)	Franco (21)	47,685	57–31
89	July 11	Mets	7–9	Lidle (4–1)	**Glavine** (9–5)	Franco (22)	40,094	57–32
90	July 12	Mets	7–4	**Maddux** (12–3)	Clark (7–6)	**Wohlers** (21)	48,091	58–32
91	July 13	Mets	6–7 (10)	McMichael (6–6)	**Bielecki** (3–6)	Franco (23)	42,111	58–33
92	July 14	Phillies	10–6	**Millwood** (1–0)	Brewer (0–2)	**Wohlers** (22)	38,118	59–33
93	July 15	Phillies	1–8	Stephenson (3–4)	**Smoltz** (8–8)	—	39,494	59–34
94	July 16	Rockies	2–1	**Glavine** (10–5)	Dipoto (3–2)	**Wohlers** (23)	48,400	60–34
95	July 17	Rockies	8–2	**Maddux** (13–3)	Swift (4–3)	—	48,024	61–34
96	July 18	Dodgers	4–1	**Neagle** (13–2)	Reyes (1–1)	**Wohlers** (24)	48,721	62–34
97	July 19	Dodgers	1–4	Astacio (6–7)	**Millwood** (1–1)	Radinsky (1)	49,758	62–35
98	July 20	Dodgers	3–8	Park (8–5)	**Smoltz** (8–9)	—	48,414	62–36
99	July 21	Dodgers	5–4 (10)	**Embree** (2–1)	Dreifort (3–1)	—	49,318	63–36
100	July 22 (1)	@ Cubs	4–1	**Maddux** (14–3)	Gonzales (7–3)	—	N/A	64–36
101	July 22 (2)	@ Cubs	4–5	Bottenfield (2–2)	**Cather** (0–1)	Rojas (12)	31,804	64–37
102	July 23	@ Cubs	1–3	Tapani (1–0)	**Millwood** (1–2)	Rojas (13)	34,230	64–38
103	July 25	@ Reds	7–3	**Smoltz** (9–9)	Schourek (5–6)	—	34,931	65–38
104	July 26	@ Reds	6–7 (11)	Shaw (3–0)	**Wohlers** (2–4)	—	33,115	65–39
105	July 27	@ Reds	3–2	**Maddux** (15–3)	Burba (6–10)	**Wohlers** (25)	30,167	66–39
106	July 28	Cubs	6–0	**Neagle** (14–2)	Tapani (1–1)	—	47,266	67–39
107	July 29	Cubs	7–2	**Millwood** (2–2)	Trachsel (5–9)	—	44,131	68–39
108	July 30	Cubs	6–5	**Embree** (3–1)	Rojas (0–4)	—	43,090	69–39
109	July 31	@ Marlins	0–1	Saunders (3–3)	**Byrd** (3–1)	Nen (27)	18,409	69–40

August: 16–11 (Home: 8–6; Away: 8–5)

#	Date	Opponent	Score	Win	Loss	Save	Attendance	Record
110	August 1	@ Marlins	2–3 (12)	Powell (2–2)	**Cather** (0–2)	—	40,669	69–41
111	August 2	@ Marlins	4–2	**Neagle** (15–2)	Leiter (8–7)	**Wohlers** (26)	41,643	70–41
112	August 3	@ Marlins	4–8	Fernandez (13–8)	**Millwood** (2–3)	—	41,193	70–42
113	August 4	@ Pirates	6–0	**Smoltz** (10–9)	Cooke (8–11)	—	21,609	71–42
114	August 5	@ Pirates	4–5	Schmidt (7–6)	**Glavine** (10–6)	Loiselle (18)	20,069	71–43
115	August 6	Cardinals	4–3	**Wohlers** (3–4)	Petkovsek (4–5)	—	46,880	72–43
116	August 7	Cardinals	3–0	**Neagle** (16–2)	Stottlemyre (11–8)	**Wohlers** (27)	46,687	73–43
117	August 8	Marlins	4–6	Fernandez (14–8)	**Byrd** (3–2)	Nen (28)	49,335	73–44
118	August 9	Marlins	4–3	**Smoltz** (11–9)	Stanifer (1–1)	**Wohlers** (28)	47,552	74–44
119	August 10	Marlins	2–4 (10)	Powell (3–2)	**Bielecki** (3–7)	Nen (29)	47,649	74–45
120	August 11	Marlins	2–1	**Wohlers** (4–4)	Heredia (4–2)	—	47,870	75–45
121	August 12	Pirates	2–5	Sodowsky (2–2)	**Wohlers** (4–5)	Loiselle (19)	42,435	75–46
122	August 13	Pirates	1–2	Lieber (7–12)	**Smoltz** (11–10)	Loiselle (20)	40,793	75–47
123	August 15	@ Cardinals	2–3 (12)	King (1–0)	**Cather** (0–3)	—	43,863	75–48
124	August 16	@ Cardinals	5–3	**Maddux** (16–3)	Morris (8–8)	**Wohlers** (29)	47,229	76–48
125	August 17	@ Cardinals	1–3	King (2–0)	**Neagle** (16–3)	Eckersley (29)	40,968	76–49
126	August 19	@ Astros	4–3	**Smoltz** (12–10)	Hampton (10–8)	**Wohlers** (30)	32,145	77–49
127	August 20	@ Astros	3–1	**Glavine** (11–6)	Reynolds (6–8)	**Wohlers** (31)	25,593	78–49
128	August 22	Reds	6–2	**Maddux** (17–3)	Remlinger (6–5)	—	48,937	79–49
129	August 23	Reds	10–3	**Neagle** (17–3)	Tomko (8–5)	—	48,499	80–49
130	August 24	Reds	4–6 (10)	Shaw (4–2)	**Fox** (0–1)	Belinda (1)	45,577	80–50
131	August 26	Astros	7–6 (11)	**Clontz** (5–1)	Wagner (7–6)	—	37,313	81–50
132	August 27	Astros	4–6 (13)	Hudek (1–2)	**Byrd** (3–3)	Lima (2)	33,019	81–51
133	August 28	Astros	4–2	**Neagle** (18–3)	Kile (17–4)	**Wohlers** (32)	37,849	82–51
134	August 29	@ Red Sox	9–1	**Smoltz** (13–10)	Sele (12–11)	—	32,577	83–51
135	August 30	@ Red Sox	15–2	**Millwood** (3–3)	Wakefield (9–15)	—	32,865	84–51
136	August 31	@ Red Sox	7–3	**Glavine** (12–6)	Avery (6–6)	—	33,147	85–51

September: 16–10 (Home: 8–6; Away: 8–4)

#	Date	Opponent	Score	Win	Loss	Save	Attendance	Record
137	September 1	Tigers	2–4	Moehler (9–10)	**Maddux** (17–4)	T. Jones (26)	38,950	85–52
138	September 2	Tigers	5–0	**Neagle** (19–3)	Keagle (1–4)	—	32,308	86–52
139	September 3	Tigers	4–12	Blair (15–6)	**Smoltz** (13–11)	—	36,556	86–53
140	September 4	@ Padres	8–7 (11)	**Wohlers** (5–5)	Worrell (3–8)	—	12,804	87–53
141	September 5	@ Padres	2–6	Ashby (8–10)	**Glavine** (12–7)	—	21,492	87–54
142	September 6	@ Padres	9–1	**Maddux** (18–4)	Hitchcock (10–9)	—	32,099	88–54
143	September 7	@ Padres	4–0	**Neagle** (20–3)	Hamilton (10–6)	—	21,052	89–54
144	September 9	@ Dodgers	4–3	**Smoltz** (14–11)	Valdez (9–11)	**Wohlers** (33)	37,270	90–54
145	September 10	@ Dodgers	7–0	**Glavine** (13–7)	R. Martinez (9–4)	—	41,564	91–54
146	September 12	Rockies	1–3	Munoz (3–3)	**Wohlers** (5–6)	Dipoto (14)	47,772	91–55
147	September 13	Rockies	6–10	Holmes (8–2)	**Cather** (0–4)	DeJean (2)	49,097	91–56
148	September 14	Rockies	0–4	Astacio (11–9)	**Smoltz** (14–12)	—	46,245	91–57
149	September 15	Giants	5–4	**Ligtenberg** (1–0)	Beck (5–4)	—	38,641	92–57
150	September 16	Giants	6–4	**Millwood** (4–3)	Alvarez (12–11)	—	37,661	93–57
151	September 17	Mets	10–2	**Maddux** (19–4)	B. Jones (14–9)	—	40,974	94–57
152	September 18	Mets	11–4	**Byrd** (4–3)	Isringhausen (2–2)	—	41,373	95–57
153	September 19	Expos	2–1	**Smoltz** (15–12)	Perez (12–12)	—	47,156	96–57
154	September 20	Expos	3–1	**Glavine** (14–7)	P. Martinez (17–8)	—	48,147	97–57
155	September 21	Expos	1–7	DeHart (2–1)	**Neagle** (20–4)	—	47,179	97–58
156	September 22	Expos	3–2 (11)	**Cather** (1–4)	Bennett (0–1)	—	41,268	98–58
157	September 23	@ Phillies	6–0	**Millwood** (5–3)	Leiter (10–17)	—	14,264	99–58
158	September 24	@ Phillies	1–5	Stephenson (8–6)	**Byrd** (4–4)	—	16,772	99–59
159	September 25	@ Phillies	3–2 (10)	**Cather** (2–4)	Spradlin (3–8)	**Clontz** (1)	15,030	100–59
160	September 26	@ Mets	7–6 (11)	**LeRoy** (1–0)	Rojas (0–6)	**Ligtenberg** (1)	21,864	101–59
161	September 27	@ Mets	1–2	Crawford (4–3)	**Wohlers** (5–7)	—	31,472	101–60
162	September 28	@ Mets	2–8	Acevedo (3–1)	**Neagle** (20–5)	—	27,176	101–61

Legend: = Win = Loss
Bold = Braves team member

== Player stats ==
=== Batting ===
==== Starters by position ====
Note: Pos = Position; G = Games played; AB = At bats; H = Hits; Avg. = Batting average; HR = Home runs; RBI = Runs batted in

Pos	Player	G	AB	H	Avg.	HR	RBI
C	Javy López	123	414	122	.295	23	68
1B	Fred McGriff	152	564	156	.277	22	97
2B	Mark Lemke	109	351	86	.245	2	26
SS	Jeff Blauser	151	519	160	.308	17	70
3B	Chipper Jones	157	597	176	.295	21	111
LF	Ryan Klesko	143	467	122	.261	24	84
CF	Kenny Lofton	122	493	164	.333	5	48
RF	Michael Tucker	138	499	141	.283	14	56

==== Other batters ====
Note: G = Games played; AB = At bats; H = Hits; Avg. = Batting average; HR = Home runs; RBI = Runs batted in

Player	G	AB	H	Avg.	HR	RBI
Andruw Jones	153	399	92	.231	18	70
Eddie Pérez	73	191	41	.215	6	18
Tony Graffanino	104	186	48	.258	8	20
Keith Lockhart	96	147	41	.279	6	32
Danny Bautista	64	103	25	.243	3	9
Mike Mordecai	61	81	14	.173	0	3
Rafael Belliard	72	71	15	.211	1	3
Greg Colbrunn	28	54	15	.278	2	9
Tommy Gregg	13	19	5	.263	0	0
Randall Simon	13	14	6	.429	0	1
Tim Spehr	8	14	3	.214	1	4
Greg Myers	9	9	1	.111	0	1
Ed Giovanola	14	8	2	.250	0	0

=== Pitching ===
==== Starting pitchers ====
Note; G = Games pitched, IP = Innings pitched; W = Wins; L = Losses; ERA = Earned run average; SO = Strikeouts

Player	G	IP	W	L	ERA	SO
John Smoltz	35	256.0	15	12	3.02	241
Tom Glavine	33	240.0	14	7	2.96	152
Denny Neagle	34	233.1	20	5	2.97	172
Greg Maddux	33	232.2	19	4	2.20	177

==== Other pitchers ====
Note: G = Games pitched; IP = Innings pitched; W = Wins; L = Losses; ERA = Earned run average; SO = Strikeouts

Player	G	IP	W	L	ERA	SO
Kevin Millwood	12	51.1	5	3	4.03	42
Terrell Wade	12	42.0	2	3	5.36	35
Chris Brock	7	30.2	0	0	5.58	16

==== Relief pitchers ====
Note: G = Games pitched; W = Wins; L = Losses; SV = Saves; ERA = Earned run average; SO = Strikeouts

Player	G	W	L	SV	ERA	SO
Mark Wohlers	71	5	7	33	3.50	92
Alan Embree	66	3	1	0	2.54	45
Brad Clontz	51	5	1	1	3.75	42
Mike Bielecki	50	3	7	2	4.08	60
Mike Cather	35	2	4	0	2.39	29
Paul Byrd	31	4	4	0	5.26	37
Chad Fox	30	0	1	0	3.29	28
Joe Borowski	20	2	2	0	3.75	6
Kerry Ligtenberg	15	1	0	1	3.00	19
John LeRoy	1	1	0	0	0.00	3

== Turner Field ==
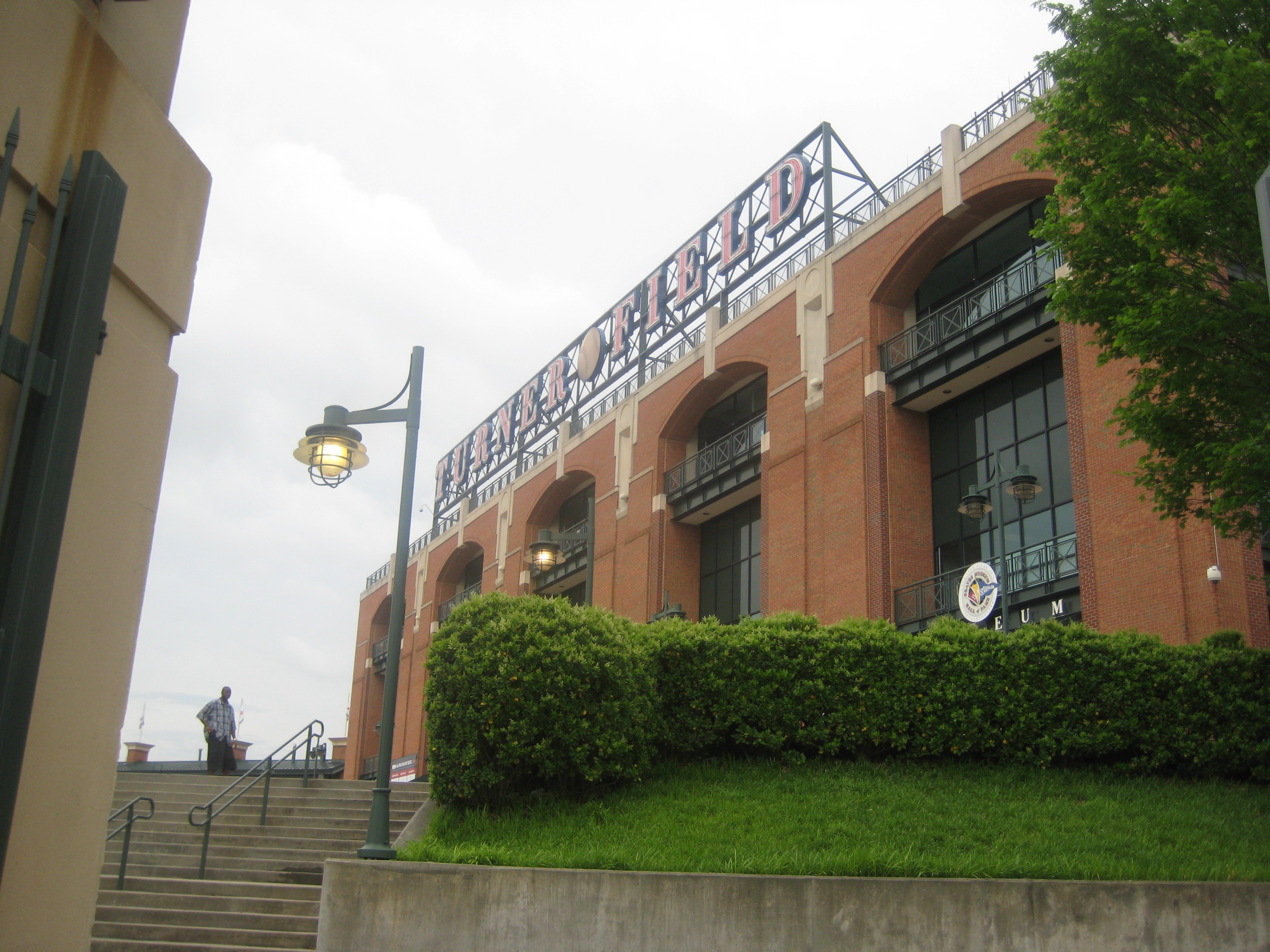
Turner Field exterior from Ralph David Abernathy Boulevard

In 1997, the Braves moved into Turner Field. The ballpark was built across the street from the former home of the Braves, Atlanta–Fulton County Stadium, which was demolished in the summer of 1997.

The most popular name choice among Atlanta residents for the new stadium at the time of its construction (according to a poll in the Atlanta Journal-Constitution) was Hank Aaron Stadium. After the ballpark was instead named after Ted Turner, the city of Atlanta renamed the section of Capitol Avenue on which the stadium sits Hank Aaron Drive, giving Turner Field the street number 755, after Aaron's home run total.

After the 1996 Summer Olympics were complete the stadium was officially given as a gift to the Atlanta National League Baseball Club, Inc. (the Atlanta Braves) Ted Turner, then owner of the Braves, agreed to pay a large sum of the cost to build Centennial Olympic Stadium (approximately $170 million of the $209 million bill), if in turn, the stadium was built in a way that it could be converted to a new baseball stadium and that the Atlanta Committee for the Olympic Games (ACOG) paid for the conversion. This was considered a good agreement for both the Olympic Committee and the Braves, because there would be no use for a permanent 85,000 seat track and field stadium in Downtown Atlanta (as the 71,000 seat Georgia Dome was completed four years earlier by the state of Georgia) and the Braves had already been exploring opportunities for a new stadium.

== Postseason ==
=== Game log ===
1997 Postseason Game Log
National League Division Series: 3–0

#	Date	Opponent	Score	Win	Loss	Save	Attendance	Record
1	September 30	Astros	2–1	Maddux (1–0)	Kile (0–1)	—	46,467	1–0
2	October 1	Astros	13–3	Glavine (1–0)	Hampton (0–1)	—	49,200	2–0
3	October 3	@ Astros	4–1	Smoltz (1–0)	Reynolds (0–1)	—	53,688	3–0

National League Championship Series: 2–4

#	Date	Opponent	Score	Win	Loss	Save	Attendance	Record
1	October 7	Marlins	3–5	Brown (1–0)	Maddux (1–1)	Nen (1)	49,244	0–1
2	October 8	Marlins	7–1	Glavine (2–0)	Fernandez (1–1)	—	48,933	1–1
3	October 10	@ Marlins	2–5	Hernandez (1–0)	Smoltz (1–1)	Nen (2)	53,857	1–2
4	October 11	@ Marlins	4–0	Neagle (1–0)	Leiter (0–1)	—	54,890	2–2
5	October 12	@ Marlins	1–2	Hernandez (2–0)	Maddux (1–2)	—	51,982	2–3
6	October 14	Marlins	4–7	Brown (2–0)	Glavine (2–1)	—	50,446	2–4

== Farm system ==
Level	Team	League	Manager
AAA	Richmond Braves	International League	Bill Dancy
AA	Greenville Braves	Southern League	Randy Ingle
A	Durham Bulls	Carolina League	Paul Runge
A	Macon Braves	South Atlantic League	Brian Snitker
A-Short Season	Eugene Emeralds	Northwest League	Jim Saul
Rookie	Danville Braves	Appalachian League	Rick Albert
Rookie	GCL Braves	Gulf Coast League	Frank Howard

LEAGUE CHAMPIONS: Greenville
