= Nuclear (Ryan Adams song) =

Single by Ryan Adams

from the album Demolition
- B-side: "Blue"; "Song For Keith"
- Released: September 16, 2002; March 4, 2003
- Studio: Javelina (Nashville, Tennessee)
- Genre: Alternative country
- Label: Lost Highway Records
- Songwriter(s): Ryan Adams
- Producer(s): Dave Domanich

Ryan Adams singles chronology
| "Answering Bell" (2002) | "Nuclear" (2002) | "So Alive" (2004) |

"Nuclear" is a song by singer-songwriter Ryan Adams from his 2002 album Demolition, the only single from the album.

The song was recorded during Adams' July 2001 sessions with the Pinkhearts in Nashville.

In 2002, Adams spoke with CNN about the song: "I guess it's Britpop for Americans. I don't know what it is, really, but the lyrics are funny. There's actually a really funny line in it that says, 'I saw her and the Yankees lost to the Braves.' If you're from Atlanta, that's not a very nice thing to say. It's sort of referring to the fact that the Braves never win." (The Atlanta Braves lost both the 1996 and 1999 World Series to the New York Yankees.)

Among the b-sides included on the various "Nuclear" singles are the non-album tracks "Blue" and "Song For Keith". Adams co-wrote "Blue" with Julianna Raye, and the song comes from the 48 Hours sessions. "Song For Keith" is a tribute to Rolling Stones guitarist Keith Richards and was recorded during The Pinkhearts Sessions.

== Track listings ==
European CD Single (released 16 September 2002)

1. "Nuclear" (LP version)
2. "Blue" (non-album track)

UK 7" Single (released 16 September 2002)

1. "Nuclear" (LP version)
2. "Song For Keith" (non-album track)

CD1 Single (released 4 March 2003)

1. "Nuclear" (LP version)
2. "Blue" (non-album track)
3. "Song For Keith" (non-album track)

CD2 Single (released 4 March 2003)

1. "Nuclear" (LP version)
2. "New York, New York" (Live in Amsterdam)
3. "To Be Young (Is To Be Sad, Is To Be High)" (Live in Amsterdam)

== Personnel and production credits ==
- Ryan Adams — electric guitar, vocals
- Bucky Baxter — steel guitar
- Billy Mercer — bass
- Brad Pemberton — drums
- Brad Rice — electric guitar
- Produced by Dave Domanich
- Engineered by Warren Peterson and Chad Brown
- Recorded at Javelina Recording Studios (Nashville, Tennessee)

"Blue"

- Ryan Adams — lead vocal and guitar
- Greg Leisz — pedal steel
- Chris Stills — rhythm guitar
- Ethan Johns — drums
- Julianna Raye — background vocals
- Produced by Ethan Johns

"Song For Keith"

- Ryan Adams — lead vocal, guitar and drums
- Billy Mercer — bass: Billy Mercer
- David Rawlings — guitar
- Brad Rice — guitar and background vocals
- Tony Scalzo — piano
- Produced by Dave Domanich
