= 1996 World Series =

92nd edition of Major League Baseball's championship series

Team (Wins)	Managers	Season
New York Yankees (4)	Joe Torre	92–70 (.568), GA: 4
Atlanta Braves (2)	Bobby Cox	96–66 (.593), GA: 8
- Dates: October 20–26
- Venue(s): Yankee Stadium (New York); Atlanta–Fulton County Stadium (Atlanta)
- MVP: John Wetteland (New York)
- Umpires: Jim Evans (AL, crew chief), Terry Tata (NL), Tim Welke (AL), Steve Rippley (NL), Larry Young (AL), Gerry Davis (NL)
- Hall of Famers: Yankees: Wade Boggs; Derek Jeter; Tim Raines; Mariano Rivera; Joe Torre (manager); Braves: Bobby Cox (manager); John Schuerholz (GM); Tom Glavine; Andruw Jones; Chipper Jones; Greg Maddux; Fred McGriff; John Smoltz

Broadcast
- Television: Fox (United States); MLB International (International); CTV Television Network (Canada)
- TV announcers: Joe Buck, Tim McCarver, and Bob Brenly (Fox); Gary Thorne and Rick Cerone (MLB International)
- Radio: CBS; WABC (NYY); WSB (ATL)
- Radio announcers: Vin Scully and Jeff Torborg (CBS); John Sterling and Michael Kay (WABC); Skip Caray, Pete Van Wieren, Don Sutton, and Joe Simpson (WSB)
- ALCS: New York Yankees over Baltimore Orioles (4–1)
- NLCS: Atlanta Braves over St. Louis Cardinals (4–3)

The 1996 World Series was the championship series of Major League Baseball's (MLB) 1996 season. The 92nd edition of the World Series, it was a best-of-seven playoff between the National League (NL) champion (and defending World Series champion) Atlanta Braves and the American League (AL) champion New York Yankees. The Yankees defeated the Braves four games to two to capture their first World Series title since 1978 and their 23rd overall. The series was played from October 20–26, 1996, and was broadcast on television on Fox. Yankees relief pitcher John Wetteland was named the World Series Most Valuable Player for saving all four Yankee wins.

The Yankees advanced to the World Series by defeating the Texas Rangers in the AL Division Series, three games to one, and then the Baltimore Orioles in the AL Championship Series, four games to one. It was the Yankees' first appearance in a World Series since 1981. The Braves advanced to the Series by defeating the Los Angeles Dodgers in the NL Division Series, three games to none, and then the St. Louis Cardinals in the NL Championship Series, four games to three. It was the Braves' second consecutive appearance in a World Series.

The Yankees lost the first two games at home, being outscored by the Braves, 16–1. However, they rebounded to win the next four games, the last three in close fashion, including a dramatic comeback win in Game 4 to tie the series. They became the third team to win a World Series after losing Games 1 and 2 at their home stadium, following the Kansas City Royals in 1985 and the New York Mets in 1986. They also became the first team since the Los Angeles Dodgers in 1981 to win four consecutive games in a World Series after losing the first two. It would be 29 years before another team lost Games 1 & 2 at home in a best-of-seven series (LCS or World Series) and come back to win the series, when the Toronto Blue Jays defeated the Seattle Mariners in the 2025 American League Championship Series, 4–3.

Game 5 was the final game to be played at Atlanta–Fulton County Stadium, as the Braves moved into Turner Field the following season. Atlanta became the only city to host the World Series and the Olympics in the same year and Atlanta–Fulton County Stadium became the only stadium to host baseball in an Olympics and the World Series in the same year. The Yankees victory also resulted in general manager Bob Watson becoming the first African-American general manager to win the World Series.

== Background ==
The 1996 World Series marked the beginning of the New York Yankees' dynasty of the late 1990s and early 2000s. Despite the rich playoff history of the Yankees, the defending champion Atlanta Braves entered the Series as heavy favorites.

The Yankees had reached the Fall Classic after their ALCS victory over the Baltimore Orioles, while the Braves had rallied from a 3–1 deficit to defeat the St. Louis Cardinals in the NLCS.

The Braves used the dominant pitching of Greg Maddux and Tom Glavine, as well as timely hitting, to defeat the Indians the year before, and looked to reuse that recipe against the upstart Yankees. In 1996, John Smoltz returned to form, winning 24 games and a Cy Young Award, providing another serious pitching threat for Atlanta. New York brought a lineup mixed with veterans, like Paul O'Neill, and young stars, like rookie Derek Jeter. The Yankees bullpen was also vastly superior to the Atlanta bullpen, which would prove to be the deciding factor in the Series.

New York's season was marked by tragedy and triumphant. Joe Torre managed through the season while his brother Rocco died of a heart attack in June, and his other brother, Frank, underwent a heart transplant during the World Series. Utility infielder Luis Sojo missed time after his father died, and Paul O'Neill's father died during the World Series. Early in the season, David Cone's career nearly came to abrupt end after he was diagnosed with a rare aneurysm in his right armpit. Cone later came back in September and nearly threw a no-hitter in his first start against the Oakland Athletics. Dwight Gooden, who one of the premier pitchers in the 1980s, was given up on after poor pitching and failing multiple drug test before signing with the Yankees in 1995. On May 14, 1996, he no-hit the Seattle Mariners 2–0 at Yankee Stadium, which was the first Yankees no-hitter by a right-handed pitcher since Don Larsen's perfect game in the 1956 World Series.

Over the course of the 1996 World Series, the Braves hit .315 during the first six innings and .176 afterward. Atlanta had more hits, runs, homers, and a lower team ERA during the course of the series, but still lost, much like the 1960 Yankees' performance against the Pittsburgh Pirates.

This is the first World Series to feature the series logo on the side of each team's hats.

This was also the last of four consecutive World Series (1992–1996) to be presided over jointly by the presidents of the American and National Leagues in lieu of the Commissioner of Baseball, as Paul Beeston would be named CEO of Major League Baseball for the 1997 Major League Baseball season. Following Game 6, then-American League president Gene Budig presided over the Commissioner's Trophy presentation to the Yankees. Then-Chairman of the Executive Committee (and de facto Commissioner) Bud Selig, who had presided over the trophy presentations in 1995 and would do so again in 1997, officially became Commissioner in 1998.

Yankees' manager Joe Torre was facing off against the team he starred for as a player from 1960 to 1968 and managed from 1982 to 1984. For the Braves, Torre was an All-Star from 1963 to 1967.

== Summary ==
AL New York Yankees (4) vs. NL Atlanta Braves (2)

Game	Date	Score	Location	Time	Attendance
1	October 20	Atlanta Braves – 12, New York Yankees – 1	Yankee Stadium	3:10	56,365
2	October 21	Atlanta Braves – 4, New York Yankees – 0	Yankee Stadium	2:44	56,340
3	October 22	New York Yankees – 5, Atlanta Braves – 2	Atlanta–Fulton County Stadium	3:22	51,843
4	October 23	New York Yankees – 8, Atlanta Braves – 6 (10)	Atlanta–Fulton County Stadium	4:17	51,881
5	October 24	New York Yankees – 1, Atlanta Braves – 0	Atlanta–Fulton County Stadium	2:54	51,881
6	October 26	Atlanta Braves – 2, New York Yankees – 3	Yankee Stadium	2:52	56,375

== Matchups ==
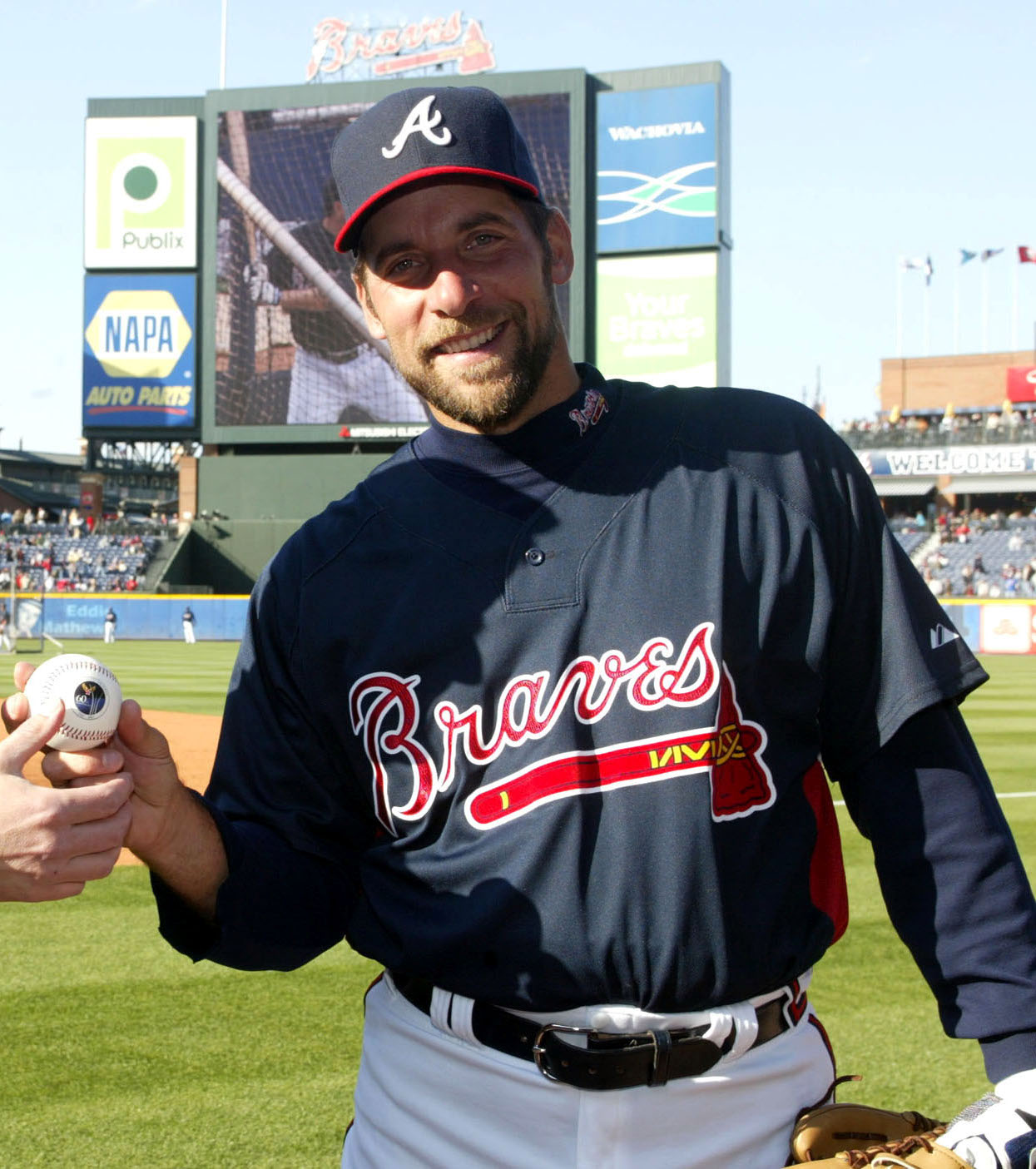
John Smoltz, the winning pitcher in Game 1.

=== Game 1 ===
October 20, 1996 7:35 pm (EDT) at Yankee Stadium in Bronx, New York 56 °F (13 °C), mostly cloudy
Team	1	2	3	4	5	6	7	8	9	R	H	E
Atlanta	0	2	6	0	1	3	0	0	0	12	13	0
New York	0	0	0	0	1	0	0	0	0	1	4	1
WP: John Smoltz (1–0) LP: Andy Pettitte (0–1); Home runs: ATL: Andruw Jones 2 (2), Fred McGriff (1); NYY: None; Attendance: 56,365; Boxscore

Game 1 and Game 2 were originally scheduled for Saturday, October 19, and Sunday, October 20. Rain on October 19, however, washed out Game 1. The schedule was moved back one day, with Game 1 and Game 2 rescheduled for October 20 and 21, and the Monday travel day eliminated. This was the first time weather resulted in a postponement since the 1986 World Series, where Game 7 was delayed one day due to inclement weather.

The game was a matchup of league wins leaders. The Yankees sent out lefthander Andy Pettitte, who in only his second full season in the major leagues had won 21 games and made the American League All-Star Team. For the Braves went veteran John Smoltz, who won a career high 24 games and led the National League in strikeouts.

Entering the World Series, Atlanta had completed a comeback from a 3–1 deficit and beaten the St. Louis Cardinals by a margin of 32–1 in the three previous games. They continued their offensive onslaught in Game One.

In the second inning, rookie Braves outfielder Andruw Jones stepped to the plate with catcher Javy Lopez on base and two out. The 19-year-old native of Curaçao drove a full-count pitch over the left field fence to open the scoring. In doing this he broke the record held by Mickey Mantle of being the youngest player in World Series history to hit a home run in his first Series at-bat.

One inning later, the defending champions broke the game open. Jeff Blauser and Marquis Grissom opened the top of the third with singles, and were moved into scoring position by a sacrifice bunt from Mark Lemke. Chipper Jones then singled to score the runners, advancing to second on a throw to the plate. While Fred McGriff batted, Jones stole third base and then scored himself when McGriff followed his single with one of his own. After issuing a walk to Lopez, Pettitte was pulled from the game with Yankees manager Joe Torre calling on Brian Boehringer to get out of the jam his team was in.

With his team now trailing by five runs, Boehringer faced Jermaine Dye and got him to fly out to left. However, once again the young outfielder from the Caribbean came through as Andruw Jones hit his second home run in the next at-bat to make the score 8–0. McGriff later added his own home run off Boehringer in the fifth which struck the right field foul pole with a loud clang.

The Yankees' offense, meanwhile, had been unable to do much against Smoltz. Entering their half of the fifth, they had yet to record a hit and, despite Smoltz recording four walks, had stranded every baserunner that they had managed to get on. In the fifth, they did break through for their first run when veteran third baseman Wade Boggs drove in rookie sensation Derek Jeter with a double.

The Braves closed out the scoring in the sixth. Andruw Jones singled off Boehringer and Ryan Klesko reached on an error by second baseman Mariano Duncan. After Blauser's fly ball out advanced Jones to third, Grissom and Lemke recorded consecutive hits to drive in the baserunners and make the score 11–1. David Weathers came in with runners now on the corners and one out, then gave up a sacrifice fly out that scored Grissom.

Smoltz pitched six innings to get the victory, recording the single run on two hits. Relievers Greg McMichael, Denny Neagle, Terrell Wade, and Brad Clontz held the Yankees scoreless in the final three innings. Pettitte, in his first World Series start, took the loss after being charged with seven of the 12 Braves runs in 2.2 innings of work.

Andruw Jones, with his two home runs in the first at bats, joined Gene Tenace as the only other player to homer in his first two World Series at bats.

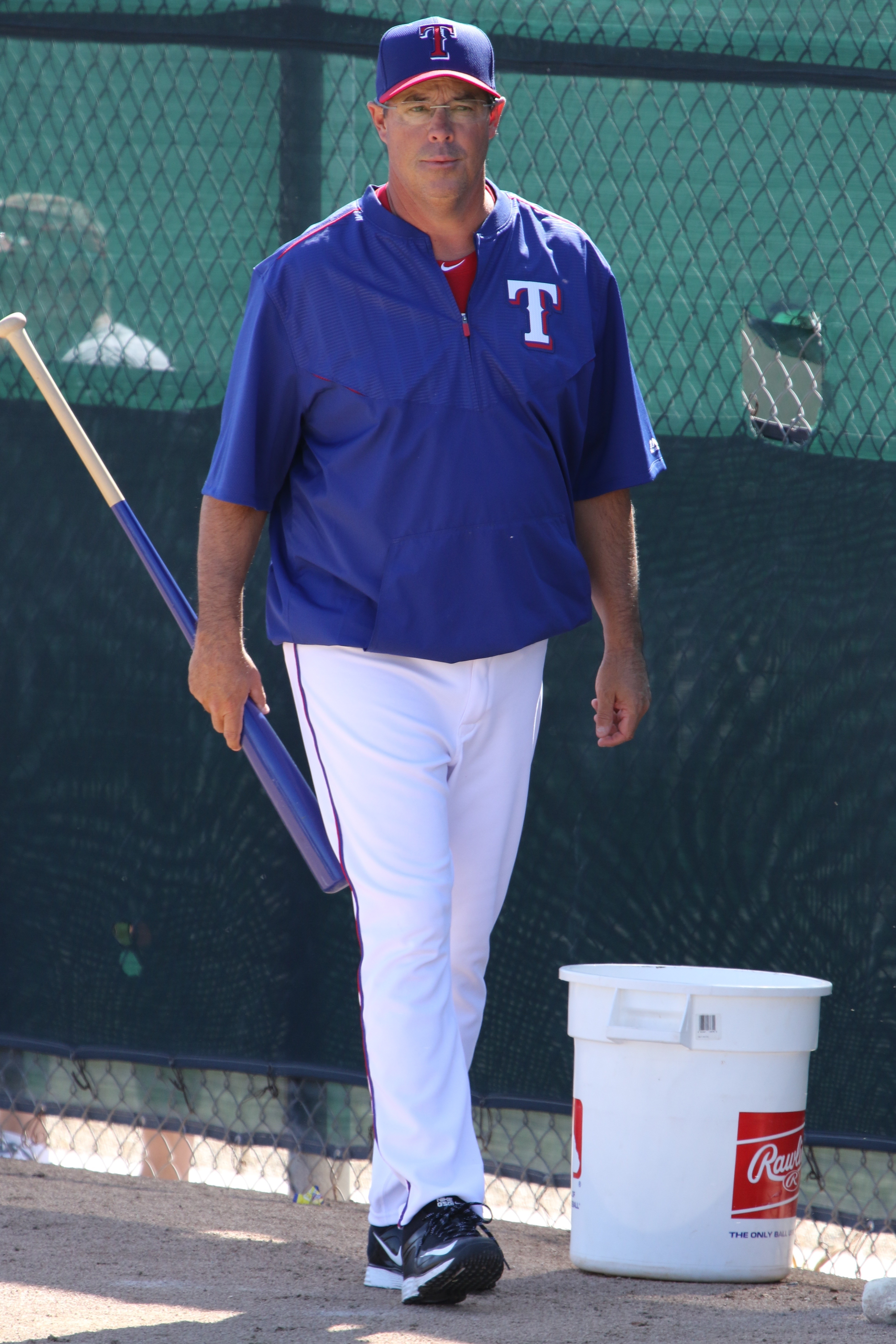
Greg Maddux hurled eight shutout innings against the Yankees in Game 2.

=== Game 2 ===
October 21, 1996 7:15 pm (EDT) at Yankee Stadium in Bronx, New York 55 °F (13 °C), mostly cloudy
Team	1	2	3	4	5	6	7	8	9	R	H	E
Atlanta	1	0	1	0	1	1	0	0	0	4	10	0
New York	0	0	0	0	0	0	0	0	0	0	7	1
WP: Greg Maddux (1–0) LP: Jimmy Key (0–1); Attendance: 56,340; Boxscore

Game 2 of the series saw the Braves turn to four-time defending Cy Young Award winner Greg Maddux to start. As a free agent in 1992, Maddux nearly signed with the Yankees, but the Yankees inner-turmoil in their front office and Maddux's preference to stay in the National League, saw him sign with the Braves instead. The Yankees trotted out one of their few pitchers that actually had World Series experience, the veteran Jimmy Key. Just before signing with the Yankees as a free agent in 1993, Key had defeated the Braves twice in the 1992 World Series, including in the Series-clincher, while pitching for the Toronto Blue Jays.

As they had in Game 1, the Yankees again struggled against a strong Braves starter. Maddux pitched eight shutout innings and, despite giving up six hits, only allowed two runners to reach third base. Despite only striking out two batters, he managed to retire most of the hitters he faced on ground ball outs; he also did not walk a batter, only allowing one additional runner to reach when he hit Derek Jeter with a pitch in the third inning.

Key, meanwhile, had trouble getting Fred McGriff out with runners on base. In the first inning, following a pitch Key thought was a strike, McGriff singled with two outs to drive home Mark Lemke, who had hit a ground-rule double earlier. Then, in the third inning, McGriff came up with Marquis Grissom at third and singled again, driving the second Atlanta run in. Finally, in the fifth, McGriff drove in his third run of the game by hitting a sacrifice fly to score Lemke from third with nobody out. The Braves' fourth run came when Grissom singled off Key in the sixth to drive in Terry Pendleton.

Mark Wohlers, a long-time Brave reliever of postseasons past who was now the team's closer, relieved Maddux in the ninth and struck out Bernie Williams, Tino Martinez, and Paul O'Neill to end the game and put the Braves up 2-0 heading back to Atlanta.

After the game, Yankees manager Joe Torre and his first base coach José Cardenal met with owner George Steinbrenner, furious at the team's performance in the World Series so far. At that post-game meeting, Torre guaranteed three victories in Atlanta and then bringing the series back to Yankee Stadium to clinch at home. Steinbrenner doubted Torre, saying, "If you guys can't beat the Braves at home, you surely can't beat them down in Atlanta."

This was the Braves' last win in a World Series game until Game 1 of in their 2021 championship season, having gone 0–8 in WS games in the interim.

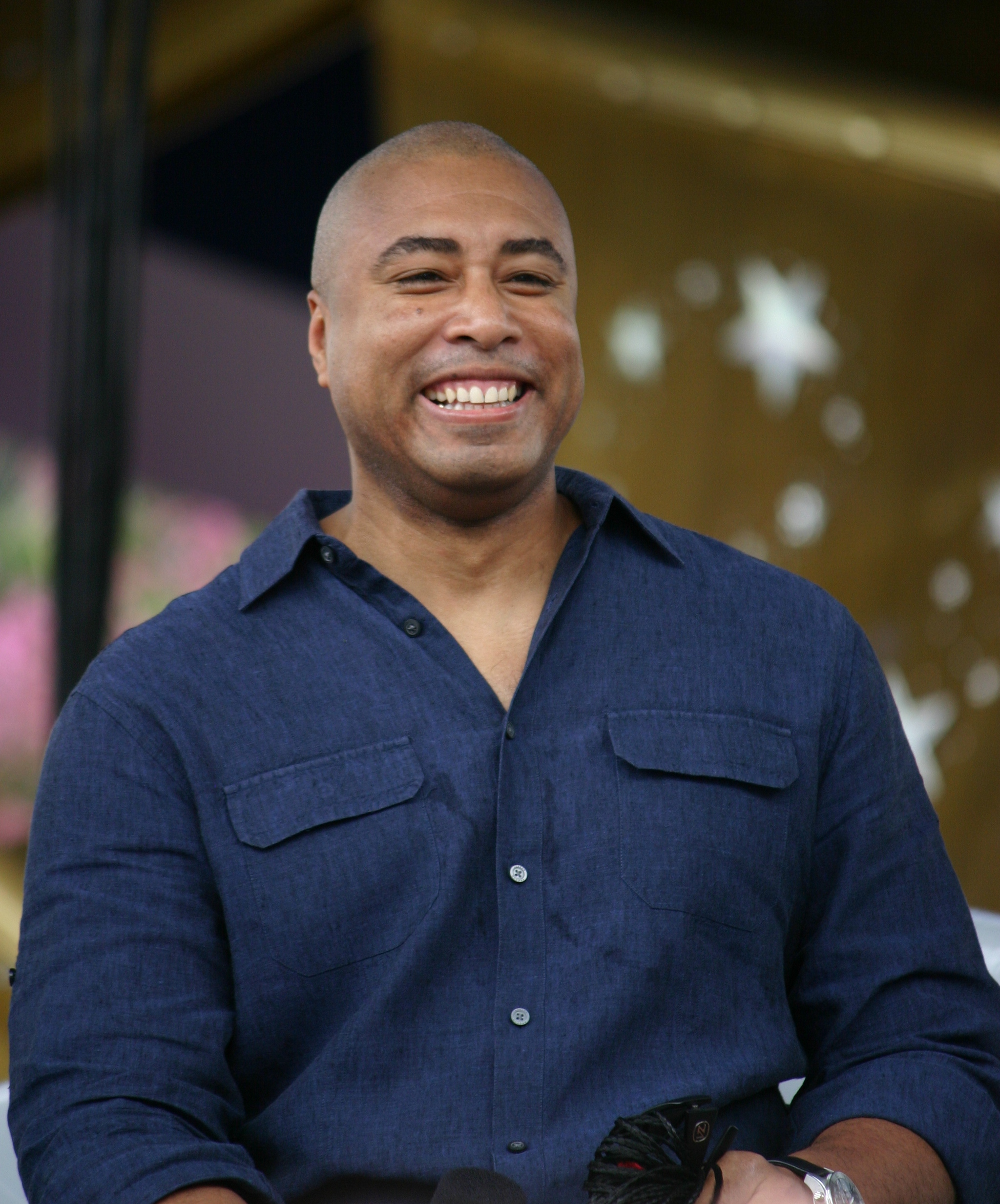
Bernie Williams hit 2-run home run, the only one of Game 3.

=== Game 3 ===
October 22, 1996 8:15 pm (EDT) at Atlanta–Fulton County Stadium in Atlanta, Georgia 71 °F (22 °C), clear
Team	1	2	3	4	5	6	7	8	9	R	H	E
New York	1	0	0	1	0	0	0	3	0	5	8	1
Atlanta	0	0	0	0	0	1	0	1	0	2	6	1
WP: David Cone (1–0) LP: Tom Glavine (0–1) Sv: John Wetteland (1); Home runs: NYY: Bernie Williams (1); ATL: None; Attendance: 51,843; Boxscore

The Yankees decided to shake their lineup up prior to Game 3 in an attempt to get themselves out of the slump they experienced in the first two games. Manager Joe Torre took veterans Paul O'Neill, Wade Boggs, and Tino Martinez out of the lineup. Replacing Boggs at third base was Charlie Hayes, while Darryl Strawberry took O'Neill's spot in right field. After starting him as the designated hitter in the first two games, Torre decided to keep Cecil Fielder in the lineup and had him replace Martinez at first base.

With the Braves looking to make it a 3–0 lead in the series, they sent veteran Tom Glavine to the mound to start Game 3. He had started the most recent World Series game in Atlanta, the 1–0 shutout in Game 6 in 1995 which he won and which helped him earn the series MVP award.

The Yankees' starter, meanwhile, was returning from nearly having his career end. David Cone had signed a three-year contract to stay with the Yankees after he was traded to them by Toronto during the 1995 season. He started off the season pitching well, but was discovered to have an aneurysm in his pitching arm and forced to miss most of the season. He did manage to come back toward the end of the season and was kept on the postseason roster. Cone was also previously experienced in World Series play, having played for the same 1992 Blue Jays team as Game 2 starter Jimmy Key; he managed two no-decisions in both of his prior starts.

The Yankees got the first run of the game in their first turn at bat. Tim Raines led off with a walk and moved to second on a sacrifice bunt from Derek Jeter. Bernie Williams drove him in with a single. The Yankees added another in the fourth inning. After Williams reached on a Jeff Blauser error, he would advance on a walk to Fielder and then a line drive to the right that Andruw Jones caught. Strawberry drove in the unearned run with a single; and after Mariano Duncan struck out, Joe Girardi drew a walk to put two runners on for Cone. Cone did manage to make contact, but hit the ball right at a stumbling Chipper Jones who touched third base to end the inning.

Cone led off the sixth inning with a walk to Glavine, followed by a single to Marquis Grissom. After retiring Mark Lemke on a failed bunt attempt, Cone loaded the bases by walking Chipper Jones. Fred McGriff popped out to Jeter for the second out, but Ryan Klesko drew a walk to force in Glavine and cut the lead to 2–1. Cone got Javy López to pop out to Girardi to end the inning, closing his night. Glavine would be done after the seventh, giving up only four hits and the earned run in the first and unearned run in the fourth.

In the eighth inning the Yankees put the game out of reach. Jeter reached on a single off Greg McMichael and Williams hit a home run following that, extending the lead to 4–1. After Fielder doubled, Brad Clontz came in and retired Hayes. He then walked Strawberry, only to give up another run with a single from defensive replacement Luis Sojo.

The Braves tried to rally in the bottom half and got a run back off Mariano Rivera on a triple by Grissom and a single by Lemke. Rivera managed to strike out Chipper Jones, but with McGriff and Klesko looming Torre brought in lefthander Graeme Lloyd, who retired them both. Neither team threatened in the ninth and the Yankees got their much needed win.

Cone won his first World Series decision in three tries; he had previously recorded two no-decisions in the 1992 World Series. Glavine lost what would be his only start in the series that year, while Yankee closer John Wetteland received his first save.

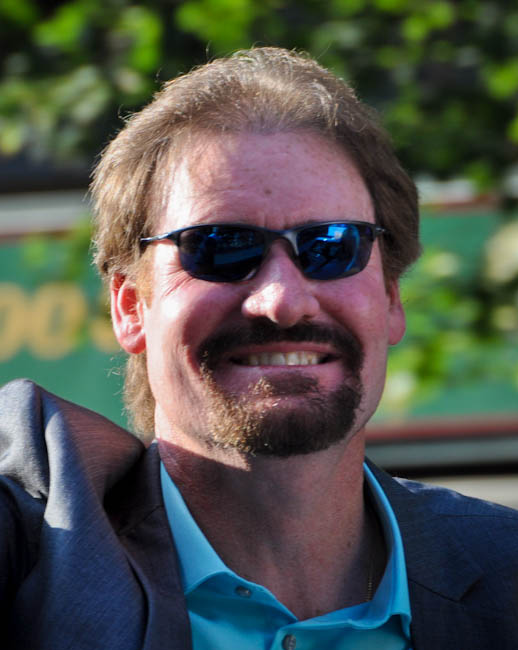
Wade Boggs drew a bases-loaded walk in the tenth inning that gave the Yankees the winning margin in Game 4.

=== Game 4 ===
October 23, 1996 8:15 pm (EDT) at Atlanta–Fulton County Stadium in Atlanta, Georgia 57 °F (14 °C), clear
Team	1	2	3	4	5	6	7	8	9	10	R	H	E
New York	0	0	0	0	0	3	0	3	0	2	8	12	0
Atlanta	0	4	1	0	1	0	0	0	0	0	6	9	2
WP: Graeme Lloyd (1–0) LP: Steve Avery (0–1) Sv: John Wetteland (2); Home runs: NYY: Jim Leyritz (1); ATL: Fred McGriff (2); Attendance: 51,881; Boxscore

The original intent for the Yankees entering the series was to use a short pitching rotation, which would have consisted of their front three starters (Pettitte, Key, and Cone) each making starts on three days rest. However, since Game 1 was postponed and the teams would have to play a potential five consecutive days, that was no longer possible. So, for Game 4, the Yankees were forced to adjust their starting pitching lineup.

Denny Neagle, who saw action in Game 1, was the starter for Atlanta. Acquired at midseason from the Pittsburgh Pirates to shore up the rotation, he did not perform well during the regular season and had no record in the postseason, but pitched decently in the NLCS allowing only two hits and two runs in two appearances and one start.

Kenny Rogers got the start for the Yankees. He had been signed away from the Texas Rangers in the off-season, where he had just made his first All-Star team, and was one of the major acquisitions the Yankees made. However, Rogers only won 12 games during the regular season and pitched poorly during the postseason, being pulled early in his Division Series and ALCS starts.

Rogers' struggles continued in the World Series. In the bottom of the second Fred McGriff led off with a home run to open the scoring. After Javy López and Andruw Jones walked, Jermaine Dye sacrificed Lopez to third. Jeff Blauser followed with a bunt single to score Lopez, and, after Neagle bunted to advance Jones and Blauser, Marquis Grissom doubled them in to give Atlanta an early 4–0 lead. Rogers was pulled after allowing Chipper Jones and McGriff to reach base to begin the third, and was charged with a fifth run when Brian Boehringer gave up a sacrifice fly to Lopez which enabled Jones to score. The Braves extended their lead to 6–0 as Andruw Jones drove in Chipper Jones with a double in the fifth off David Weathers. Meanwhile, Neagle was pitching shutout ball and the Yankees had only gotten two hits through five innings. The sixth inning, however, proved to be troublesome.

Derek Jeter led off for the Yankees and hit a pop up into foul territory on the right side. McGriff and second baseman Mark Lemke came over from their positions to see if they could catch the ball while right field umpire Tim Welke watched the play. Behind him, Dye was coming in from his position in right field and had a better angle on the ball than both infielders. Welke, however, never turned around and in the process accidentally impeded Dye's progress to the ball. Dye attempted to try to catch the foul pop anyway but it dropped in front of him, allowing Jeter to stay alive.

Jeter took advantage with a single, and after Bernie Williams drew a walk. Cecil Fielder hit a ball to right that Dye misplayed, allowing both runners to score. Charlie Hayes then followed with his own single, scoring Fielder. With the Yankees still having no outs and Darryl Strawberry due up, Bobby Cox brought in reliever Terrell Wade to replace Neagle. Strawberry drew a walk, which brought Mariano Duncan to the plate as the tying run.

The Braves went back to the bullpen and brought in veteran Mike Bielecki, who had yet to give up a run in the postseason. He struck out Duncan for the first out, then followed this up by doing the same to pinch hitters Paul O'Neill and Tino Martinez. The Braves escaped the inning without any further runs scoring. They did not manage to add any runs in their half, though, as Yankee reliever Jeff Nelson retired them in order. The seventh also proved uneventful, as Bielecki retired Tim Raines on a fly out and, after walking Jeter, struck out Williams and Fielder while Nelson induced groundouts by Lemke, Chipper Jones, and Lopez.

For the eighth inning, Cox decided to make a call to his closer early and brought in Mark Wohlers for a two-inning save. Hayes greeted him with a slow roller up the third base line that was able to stay fair, giving him an infield single. Strawberry hit a single, and Duncan followed with what should have been a double play ground ball to shortstop. Rafael Belliard, who had entered the game as a defensive replacement for Blauser, was unable to field the ball cleanly and was only able to get Strawberry out at second.

With one out and runners on the corners, catcher Jim Leyritz, who had replaced Joe Girardi in the bottom of the sixth, came up for his first at bat. Leyritz later said he felt he had an advantage because Wohlers was such a hard thrower and he was a solid fastball hitter. As such, he went up looking for a pitch to hit and with the count even at 2–2, Leyritz drove a Wohlers slider over the left field wall to tie the game at six. Cox's decision had proven to be a mistake, even though Wohlers managed to strike out the next two batters to get out of the inning.

Mariano Rivera came in for the bottom of the eighth and immediately gave up a single to Andruw Jones. Dye followed up with a sacrifice bunt to move him into scoring position. However, pinch hitter Luis Polonia struck out and Rivera got backup catcher Eddie Perez to ground out, stranding Jones and keeping the game tied entering the ninth.

After recording the first two outs in the top half, Wohlers gave up back to back singles to Fielder and Hayes in the top half and then gave up an infield hit to Strawberry which loaded the bases. However, he got out of the jam when Duncan hit a short fly ball to Dye.

After getting Grissom to pop out to start the home ninth, Rivera gave up a hit to Lemke and walked Chipper Jones. With the lefthanded McGriff due up, Yankees manager Joe Torre made another call to the bullpen for Graeme Lloyd to face him as he had in Game 3. The move worked as McGriff grounded into a double play to end the inning and extend the game into extra innings.

For the top of the tenth, Steve Avery came on to pitch for the Braves. Avery was another veteran of the Braves' postseason past and had been an integral part of their starting rotation for several years, including in 1991 when he won the NLCS Most Valuable Player award. However, after making the All-Star Team in 1993 his career had taken a downward slide and by 1996 Avery was limited to relief duties in the postseason. He was tasked with keeping the game tied against the bottom of the Yankees lineup, and started out doing just that as he retired Leyritz and Lloyd.

Avery then followed that up by walking Tim Raines on four pitches. Jeter followed with a single, and with two runners on base Cox decided again to play strategy. Williams was the batter and on deck was Andy Fox, who had pinch run for Fielder in the ninth. The Braves intentionally walked Williams to load the bases for Fox.

Torre called Fox back to the dugout and sent up the struggling Wade Boggs to try to drive in the go-ahead run. Although Avery got two early strikes, Boggs drew a walk on a full count, scoring Raines and giving the Yankees their first lead of the game. With his strategy having backfired, Cox made a double switch, bringing in Brad Clontz to pitch while Ryan Klesko replaced McGriff at first base. The next batter, Hayes, hit a pop fly that Klesko lost sight of and dropped, which scored Jeter.

Lloyd retired Klesko to lead off the bottom of the tenth, then gave way to closer John Wetteland, who gave up a single to Andruw Jones but recorded two flyouts from Dye and Terry Pendleton to get his second save of the postseason. Lloyd was credited with the win, with Avery suffering the loss. "It was our game to win and we had our chances," Avery said. "I ended up costing us the game."

This was the second biggest comeback in World Series history. In 1929, the Philadelphia Athletics scored 10 runs in the seventh inning to defeat the Chicago Cubs 10–8 in Game 4. This was also the last time the first four games were won by the road team until the 2019 World Series between the Houston Astros and Washington Nationals.

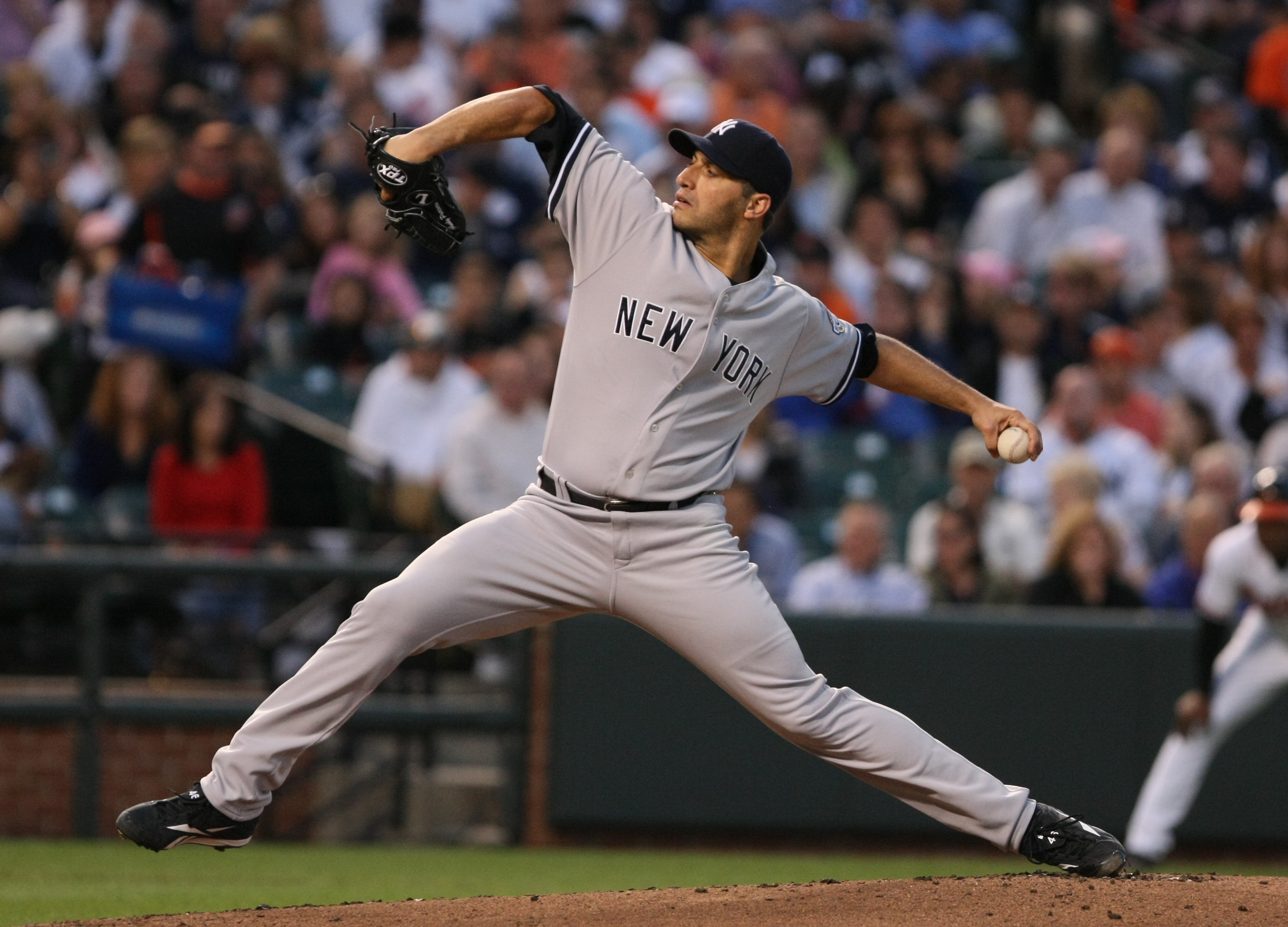
Andy Pettitte shut out the Braves' offense in Game 5 to even his record in the series.

=== Game 5 ===
October 24, 1996 8:15 pm (EDT) at Atlanta–Fulton County Stadium in Atlanta, Georgia 61 °F (16 °C), clear
Team	1	2	3	4	5	6	7	8	9	R	H	E
New York	0	0	0	1	0	0	0	0	0	1	4	1
Atlanta	0	0	0	0	0	0	0	0	0	0	5	1
WP: Andy Pettitte (1–1) LP: John Smoltz (1–1) Sv: John Wetteland (3); Attendance: 51,881; Boxscore

With the series tied and both teams guaranteed to return to New York, the Yankees and Braves took to the field for what was to be the final game ever played inside Atlanta-Fulton County Stadium. As part of the planning that went into Atlanta's winning bid for the 1996 Summer Olympics, the main venue for the Games, Centennial Olympic Stadium, would be immediately reconfigured as a baseball stadium once the Olympics and Paralympics were over; the stadium, which was placed adjacent to its soon-to-be predecessor, would be renamed Turner Field and the Braves would begin play there once the 1997 season began.

The pitching matchup featured a rematch of the Game 1 starters, with John Smoltz looking to give the Braves the series lead while Andy Pettitte sought to atone for his poor performance in Game 1 and give the Yankees the opportunity to clinch the series at home in Game 6.

Unlike in Game 1, where the Braves routed the Yankees by a 12–1 margin, Game 5 proved to be a classic pitcher's duel. In fact, only one run was scored by either team. That came in the top of the fourth inning, with Charlie Hayes leading off. He lifted a fly ball to right center field that Marquis Grissom seemed to have an easy play on. However, as he was coming toward right field, Jermaine Dye was coming from the left and crossed in front of Grissom. Grissom consequently lost sight of the ball and it dropped between him and Dye, and Hayes advanced to second base on the error. Two batters later, Cecil Fielder hit a double to drive in Hayes and give the Yankees the lead.

The Yankees threatened again in the sixth. After Bernie Williams struck out to start the inning, Fielder singled. Darryl Strawberry drew a walk, and Paul O'Neill grounded out to advance the runners to second and third. Smoltz struck out Mariano Duncan to end the inning.

Through five innings Pettitte had only allowed one hit, a single off the bat of Andruw Jones, and Grissom had been the only other Brave to reach base. But in the home half of the sixth, Atlanta threatened. Smoltz and Grissom reached base and Mark Lemke was asked to bunt to try to advance the runners so that Chipper Jones, batting next, could come up with an opportunity to drive them both in.

Facing the possibility of having the go-ahead runs in scoring position with one out, Pettitte got Lemke to bunt the ball to the third base side of the mound. Since Pettitte was left-handed, this meant he had an easier shot at getting the lead runner than he might have of throwing to first in time and he used that advantage to beat a sliding Smoltz to third with his throw. Jones then hit Pettitte's first pitch right back to him, starting a 1-4-3 double play to retire the side.

Smoltz would pitch two more innings, allowing two baserunners in the seventh; he retired Jim Leyritz on a fielder's choice play with Pettitte batting and then got Derek Jeter to lineout to Fred McGriff at first, who doubled off Pettitte to end the inning. After retiring the Yankees in order in the eighth he was lifted for a pinch hitter; he only would allow four hits and strike out ten batters, with the lone unearned run counting against him.

For the ninth inning, Braves manager Bobby Cox brought in his closer, Mark Wohlers, to try to hold the Yankees to the one-run lead they'd held since the fourth. After retiring Strawberry on a groundout, he walked O'Neill. Duncan followed with a fielder's choice that retired O'Neill, then stole second base to put himself in scoring position.

That made for a shift in strategy for the Braves. With Leyritz standing in the batter's box and two out, first base was open. The pitcher's spot was due next, and Pettitte was in fact standing in the on deck circle. Cox decided to call Joe Torre's bluff, since closer John Wetteland was loosening up in the Yankee bullpen, and called for an intentional walk to see what Torre was going to do. The call did not go completely as planned, as Wohlers threw a wild pitch on the intended play and Duncan advanced to third.

Torre elected not to go to his bench, and sent up his ace to face the hard-throwing Wohlers. Although Pettitte was retired on a flyout to end the inning, it was not a matter of whether or not he would reach base. Instead, it showed that Torre had enough confidence in Pettitte to at least send him out for the bottom of the ninth to finish the shutout.

The Braves immediately responded in their half. Chipper Jones hit a line drive to left field and was able to reach second easily, putting the tying run in scoring position. After McGriff grounded out, Torre decided to make the change and brought Wetteland into the game to face Javy López.

After he induced a groundout off the bat of López, Wetteland faced Ryan Klesko, came up to pinch hit for Andruw Jones, but Torre decided to walk him intentionally. With the winning runs now on base, Cox again went to his bench and called back the young outfielder Dye. Luis Polonia, a former Yankee, was sent up to pinch hit.

After fighting off six pitches, all foul balls, Polonia lifted a fly ball deep to right. O’Neill, who was playing with sore legs the entire series, was able to chase down the ball and caught it on the warning track, then slapped the wall with his glove in celebration as the Yankees took the victory.

The loss suffered by Smoltz was his first in seven career World Series starts; he had two victories, in Game 5 in 1992 and Game 1 of this series, and four no-decisions prior to this. It was also only his second post-season loss of his career, and in both of these losses up to that point, all the runs he surrendered were unearned. He would only pitch in one more World Series, the 1999 rematch between these two teams; he took the loss in the decisive fourth game at Yankee Stadium despite another quality start in that game.

The Yankees became the first team to sweep the middle three games of the World Series since the Braves themselves did it in 1991 (although the Braves won all three games at Fulton County Stadium in the 1991 World Series, the home team won all seven games of that series). New York was the first road team to sweep the middle three since the Baltimore Orioles in 1983, and the last until the Houston Astros in 2019 to do so (the visiting team won all seven games in the 2019 World Series for the only time).

The Braves joined the 1905 Philadelphia Athletics, the 1921 New York Yankees and the 1986 World Series champion New York Mets as the only teams to lose a 1–0 World Series game on an unearned run.

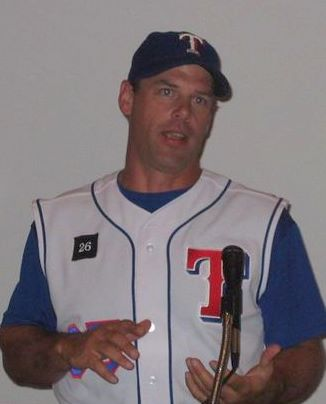
John Wetteland saved his fourth game of the series in Game 6, tying him for most games saved in a postseason series.

=== Game 6 ===
October 26, 1996 8:00 pm (EDT) at Yankee Stadium in Bronx, New York 59 °F (15 °C), mostly cloudy
Team	1	2	3	4	5	6	7	8	9	R	H	E
Atlanta	0	0	0	1	0	0	0	0	1	2	8	0
New York	0	0	3	0	0	0	0	0	X	3	8	1
WP: Jimmy Key (1–1) LP: Greg Maddux (1–1) Sv: John Wetteland (4); Attendance: 56,375; Boxscore

Prior to Game 6, Yankees manager Joe Torre's brother Frank underwent heart transplant surgery.

The Yankees, seeking to clinch their first world championship since 1978 and the first for a New York City baseball team since the Mets won in 1986, faced off against Greg Maddux in a rematch of the Game 2 starters, as Jimmy Key took to the hill for the Yankees. The Braves, for the third time in their four World Series visits thus far in the 1990s, were facing an elimination game.

The Yankees struck against Maddux in the bottom of the third inning. Paul O'Neill led off the frame with a double and advanced to third on a groundout by Mariano Duncan. Joe Girardi then hit a flyball to center field that Marquis Grissom misjudged, which scored O'Neill and gave Girardi a triple. He scored on a single by Derek Jeter, and after stealing second Jeter scored on a single by Bernie Williams. These were the only three runs Maddux gave up in the series, but they were costly. Maddux pitched the next 4 2/3 innings without giving up another run.

The Braves got a run back in the top of the fourth as Fred McGriff reached on a walk. Javy López and Andruw Jones followed with back to back singles to load the bases, and Jermaine Dye drew a walk to force in the run. Key got out of the bases loaded jam by getting designated hitter Terry Pendleton to ground into a double play to end the inning.

The top of the fifth inning saw another umpiring controversy. With Mark Lemke at the plate and one out, Girardi dropped a pitch from Key. Grissom tried to advance and Girardi's throw was late and replays clearly showed Grissom to be safe, but umpire Terry Tata called Grissom out. Atlanta manager Bobby Cox emerged from the dugout and began arguing the call to no avail. Because Chipper Jones opened the following inning with a double, the missed call likely cost the Braves a run. On his way back to the dugout Cox turned his ire to third base umpire Tim Welke, with the incident involving Welke's accidental interference ushering in a Yankee rally in Game 4 still fresh in his mind. Welke threw Cox out of the game, marking the first managerial ejection in the World Series since 1992. Incidentally, Cox was also on the receiving end in the previous instance; he had been ejected for throwing a batting helmet from the dugout to protest a strikeout call (Fox and the video recap of the series erroneously reported that Whitey Herzog's ejection in the 1985 World Series had been the last time). It was the last ejection of a manager in a World Series game until the 2019 World Series, when Dave Martinez of the Washington Nationals was also thrown out of the game in game 6.

New York manager Joe Torre pulled Key from the game in the top of the sixth with one out and Chipper Jones—who had opened the inning with a double—on third. David Weathers came in to pitch to Lopez and retired him. Then after a walk to Andruw Jones and Ryan Klesko coming in to pinch hit for Dye the Yankees went to Graeme Lloyd to pitch to Klesko, who did not have a hit against Lloyd in the series. Lloyd retired Klesko to end the inning and Mariano Rivera got the next six outs to send the game to the ninth. Maddux came out of the game one out away from a complete game in the eighth, and Mark Wohlers retired Cecil Fielder to end it.

John Wetteland was called on again for his fourth save of the series, but the Braves tried to rally. After he struck out Andruw Jones to lead off the inning, Klesko and Pendleton got back to back singles off Wetteland. With one out and runners at the corners, Luis Polonia came off the bench to pinch hit for Jeff Blauser, but failed to produce a hit and struck out swinging. Grissom then followed with another single, scoring Klesko and giving the Braves at least one more chance with Lemke at the plate. However, Lemke popped out to Charlie Hayes in foul territory to end the game, series, baseball season, and Atlanta's reign as world champions. Wetteland became the second pitcher to record four saves in a single postseason series, following Dennis Eckersley's feat in the 1988 ALCS and since matched by Greg Holland in the 2014 ALCS. He also set a new record for most saves in one postseason, with 7, since tied by 5 other pitchers (Robb Nen, Troy Percival, Brad Lidge, and Koji Uehara, besides Holland). The Yankees had waited 18 years to see another title come to the Big Apple.

== Composite box ==
1996 World Series (4–2): New York Yankees (A.L.) beat Atlanta Braves (N.L.).

Team	1	2	3	4	5	6	7	8	9	10	R	H	E
New York Yankees	1	0	3	2	1	3	0	6	0	2	18	43	5
Atlanta Braves	1	6	8	1	3	5	0	1	1	0	26	51	4
Total attendance: 324,685 Average attendance: 54,114; Winning player's share: $216,870 Losing player's share: $143,678

This World Series is notable for being one of the few six-game Series in which the winning team was outscored.
It happened previously in 1918, 1959, 1977, and 1992, and would later occur in 2003.

== Broadcasting ==
This was the first World Series to be televised by Fox, with Joe Buck calling the play-by-play and Tim McCarver and Bob Brenly serving as color commentators. At the age of 27, Buck became the second-youngest announcer to call the play-by-play of a World Series telecast. Vin Scully, who was calling the series with Jeff Torborg over CBS Radio, remains the youngest ever, having been 25 when he called the 1953 World Series for NBC television. Buck, however, became the youngest person to call all nine innings of a World Series telecast while acting as a full-time network employee (surpassing CBS' Sean McDonough, who was 30 years of age when he called the 1992 World Series), as in 1953 Scully shared play-by-play duties with Mel Allen. Also, Major League Baseball's network television policies back then allowed announcers employed by the participating World Series teams (in the case of 1953, Scully's Brooklyn Dodgers and Allen's New York Yankees) to call the action.

Having called Games 1, 4, and 5 of the 1995 World Series for ABC, and the World Series prior to that in 1993 for CBS, Tim McCarver gained the unique distinction of serving as a television color commentator for at least three consecutive World Series on three different networks. During Game 6 at Yankee Stadium, a fan behind home plate held up a sign that said "John 3:16". McCarver made mention of this sign, saying that the fan was a true Yankees fan because he knew Tommy John's career ERA. (John's career ERA is actually 3.34, not 3.16.)

The Atlanta Braves became the first Major League Baseball team to appear in World Series telecast on all four major networks (NBC in 1957–58 and 1995, ABC in 1995, CBS in 1991–92 and Fox in 1996; they would appear with NBC again in 1999 and with Fox in 2021). The Philadelphia Phillies have since duplicated this feat (NBC in 1950 and 1980, ABC in 1983, CBS in 1993 and Fox in 2008–09 and 2022.)

This marked the first time Canadian television did not simulcast American coverage of the World Series. Instead, CTV broadcast MLB International's coverage, as would happen during the years when Fox has broadcast the World Series, first through TSN and presently through SportsNet.

== Aftermath ==
=== Braves ===
The Braves, who were playing in their 4th World Series since 1991, were in the midst of an unprecedented run of success, winning their division every full season from 1991 to 2005 (not including 1994 because of the player's strike that canceled that season in August). During that period, the Braves would play in the National League Championship Series (NLCS) nearly every season from 1991 to 2001 (the lone exception being 2000). However, the Braves would make the World Series only one more time in that span, winning their fifth National League pennant in 1999. They were again defeated by the Yankees in a 4-game sweep. The Braves would not return to the World Series until 2021, and have made only three appearances in the NLCS since (in 2001, 2020, and 2021). The Braves' 2-game lead in the 1996 World Series marked the closest the Braves would come to a second World Series title in the Bobby Cox era.

=== Yankees ===
It took Yankees manager Joe Torre a record 4,272 games to make it to the World Series in his combined careers as a player and a manager, but he would not have to wait very long to go back. The Yankees would win the American League pennant five more times in the next seven seasons (only falling short of making the World Series in 1997 and 2002), which included the Yankees winning three consecutive World Series championships from 1998 to 2000. This gave the Yankees four championships in five years. The 1996 championship was the 23rd in franchise history and the first of five that Derek Jeter, Mariano Rivera, and Andy Pettitte won with the Yankees.

On October 11, 2005, A&E Home Video released the New York Yankees Fall Classic Collectors Edition (1996–2001) DVD set, featuring one World Series Game apiece from 1996, 1998, 1999, 2000, and 2001. Game 4 from the 1996 World Series is included in the set. On September 23, 2008, The Essential Games of Yankee Stadium DVD set was released, featuring six games that were played in Yankee Stadium, which were determined via fan voting. Game 6 of the 1996 Series is included in this set.

To date, the 1996 Yankees are the last team in the World Series to comeback from a 2–0 series deficit, and were the last team to overcome a 2–0 series deficit in any best-of-seven series after losing the first two games at home until the Blue Jays accomplished this feat in the 2025 American League Championship Series.

== In popular culture ==
In a notable scene from the episode "The Abstinence" of the American television series Seinfeld, George Costanza gives batting advice to Derek Jeter and Bernie Williams. When Jeter protests that they "won the World Series", referring to the 1996 Series, George derisively replies, "In six games."

== See also ==
- 1996 Japan Series
- Georgia sports curse
