= Tim Spehr =

American baseball player (born 1966)

- Catcher
- Born: July 2, 1966 (age 60); Excelsior Springs, Missouri, U.S.
- Batted: Right Threw: Right

MLB debut
- July 18, 1991, for the Kansas City Royals

Last MLB appearance
- September 28, 1999, for the Kansas City Royals

MLB statistics
- Batting average: .198
- Home runs: 19
- Runs batted in: 72
- Stats at Baseball Reference

Teams
- Kansas City Royals (1991); Montreal Expos (1993–1996); Kansas City Royals (1997); Atlanta Braves (1997); New York Mets (1998); Kansas City Royals (1998–1999)

Timothy Joseph Spehr (born July 2, 1966) is an American former professional baseball player. He played in Major League Baseball as a catcher for the Kansas City Royals (1991, 1997 and 1998–99), Montreal Expos (1993–96), Atlanta Braves (1997) and New York Mets (1998).

Spehr played college baseball for the Arizona State Sun Devils baseball team. He was not known for his offense, but he did have some power. In his first at-bat with the Atlanta Braves in 1997, he hit a grand slam (the first of two in the game, the second by Ryan Klesko) to help power a comeback from a 6–0 deficit to the Phillies. Only once did he hit above .250, when he had nine hits in 35 at-bats for the Expos in 1994.

Spehr's best season was his last, where he set career highs in many offensive categories.
