= Answering Bell =

Single by Ryan Adams

from the album Gold
- Released: 2002
- Studio: The Sound Factory (Hollywood, California)
- Genre: Alternative country
- Length: 3:05
- Label: Lost Highway
- Songwriter: Ryan Adams
- Producer: Ethan Johns

Ryan Adams singles chronology
"New York, New York" (2001)	"Answering Bell" (2002)	"Nuclear" (2002)

Music video
- "Answering Bell" on YouTube

"Answering Bell" is a song by alt-country singer-songwriter Ryan Adams from his 2001 album Gold. It was released as a CD single in 2002.

The song features Counting Crows frontman Adam Duritz on backing vocals. When Ryan Adams performed the song on The Tonight Show with Jay Leno in February 2002, Duritz sang with the band.

== Music video ==
A music video for the song, directed by Luke Scott, was shot in January 2002. Loosely based on The Wizard of Oz, the video features cameos by Elton John, Adam Duritz, and singer-songwriter Leona Naess, who was briefly engaged to Adams.

Adams reportedly got the idea for the video while sick in bed in a Hamburg, Germany hotel room, delirious from the flu medication he was taking. The singer-songwriter also claims that he asked Bryan Adams, who was staying in the same hotel at the time, to appear in the video, but Bryan turned him down.

== Track listings ==
European CD Single (released 2002)

1. "Answering Bell" (LP version)
2. "Touch, Feel & Lose" (live)
3. "Answering Bell" (live)

UK Enhanced CD (released 16 April 2002)

1. "Answering Bell (LP version)
2. "The Bar Is A Beautiful Place"
3. "Sweet Black Magic"
4. "Answering Bell" (Video)

UK Live Hits EP (released 7 May 2002)

1. "Answering Bell" (live)
2. "New York, New York" (live)
3. "To Be Young (Is To Be Sad, Is To Be High)" (live)
4. "New York, New York" (Video)
5. Photo Gallery
6. Wallpaper
7. Lyrics Sheet ("Answering Bell")
8. Biography
9. "Answering Bell" video clip
- All live tracks recorded by KRO Radio 3FM's "Leidsekade Live" at the Paradiso in Amsterdam, Holland on 10/18/01

== Personnel and production credits ==
- Ryan Adams — acoustic guitar, banjo, piano, vocals
- Bucky Baxter — steel guitar
- Jennifer Condos — bass
- Benmont Tench — Hammond B-3
- Ethan Johns — drums, guitar
- Adam Duritz — background vocals
- Produced, engineered, and mixed by Ethan Johns
