= Demolition (Ryan Adams album) =

Studio album by Ryan Adams
- Released: September 24, 2002
- Genres: Alternative country, rock
- Length: 45:16
- Label: Lost Highway Records
- Producers: Ryan Adams, Michael Blair, Frank Callari, David Domanich, Ethan Johns, Luke Lewis

Ryan Adams chronology
Gold (2001)	Demolition (2002)	Rock n Roll (2003)

Singles from Demolition
- 1. "Nuclear" Released: September 16, 2002

Professional ratings
Aggregate scores
Source	Rating
Metacritic	70/100
Review scores
Source	Rating
AllMusic	2.5/5 stars
Blender	2/5 stars
Entertainment Weekly	B−
The Guardian	3/5 stars
Los Angeles Times	4/4 stars
NME	8/10
Pitchfork	5.5/10
Rolling Stone	3/5 stars
Spin	7/10
The Village Voice	B+

Demolition is the third studio album by alt-country singer-songwriter Ryan Adams, released on September 24, 2002, on Lost Highway. The album comprises tracks from Adams' unreleased studio albums, The Suicide Handbook, The Pinkheart Sessions and 48 Hours, as well as "You Will Always Be The Same" from The Stockholm Sessions. In 2009, Adams stated: "I don’t much care for this record. The rock songs are plodding and the quiet songs belonged to better records [...] to make Gold as a compromise then to have to watch those records get broken up for Demolition was heartbreaking."

== Track listing ==
All tracks are written by Ryan Adams, except where noted.

No.	Title	Writer(s)	Length
1.	"Nuclear"		3:25
2.	"Hallelujah"		3:11
3.	"You Will Always Be the Same"		2:38
4.	"Desire"		3:41
5.	"Cry on Demand"		4:23
6.	"Starting to Hurt"		3:19
7.	"She Wants to Play Hearts"		4:01
8.	"Tennessee Sucks"		2:55
9.	"Dear Chicago"		2:13
10.	"Gimme a Sign"		3:04
11.	"Tomorrow"	Ryan Adams, Carrie Hamilton	4:23
12.	"Chin Up, Cheer Up"		2:59
13.	"Jesus (Don't Touch My Baby)"		5:09

Japanese bonus tracks
No.	Title	Writer(s)	Length
14.	"New York, New York" (Live In Amsterdam)
15.	"To Be Young (Is to Be Sad, Is to Be High)" (Live In Amsterdam)	Ryan Adams and David Rawlings
16.	"Blue"		2:28
17.	"Song for Keith"		3:29

== Personnel ==
- Ryan Adams – Vocals (all tracks), Guitar (tracks 2,3,4,5,7,9,11,12,13), Electric guitar (tracks 1,6,8,10), Harmonica (tracks 2,4), Bass (tracks 5,13), Piano (tracks 5,8), Synth (track 13), Drum Machine (track 13)
- Mikael Nord Andersson – Dobro (track 3)
- Bucky Baxter – Pedal Steel Guitar (tracks 1,6,8,10), Background vocals (tracks 5,7), Guitar (tracks 5,9)
- Michael Blair – Djembe Heartbeat (track 3)
- Sheldon Gomberg – Bass (tracks 2,4)
- Svante Henryson – Cello (track 3)
- Ethan Johns – Drums (tracks 2,4,12), Background vocals (track 2), Electric guitar (track 2), Ukulele (track 4), Bass (track 12), B3 (track 2)
- John Paul Keith – Guitar (tracks 6,10)
- Greg Leisz – Steel Guitar (tracks 2,4,12), Dobro (track 12)
- Billy Mercer – Bass (tracks 1,6,10)
- Brad Pemberton – Drums (tracks 1,6,8,10)
- David Rawlings – Guitar (track 11)
- Julianna Raye – Background vocals (track 4)
- Brad Rice – Electric guitar (tracks 1,8)
- Chris Stills – Background vocals (track 2), 12-String Acoustic Guitar (track 2), B3 (track 4)
- Gillian Welch – Background vocals (track 11)

== Charts ==
=== Album ===
Country	Peak position
US	28
France	124
Germany	83
Ireland	19
Netherlands	44
New Zealand	49
Norway	14
Sweden	15
UK	22

=== Singles ===
Year	Single	Chart	Peak position
2002	"Nuclear"	Irish Singles Chart	45
2002	"Nuclear"	UK Singles Chart	37
