= Gold (Ryan Adams album) =

Studio album by Ryan Adams
- Released: September 25, 2001
- Recorded: Sound Factory (Hollywood, California)
- Genres: Rock, alternative country
- Length: 70:26
- Label: Lost Highway
- Producer: Ethan Johns

Ryan Adams chronology
| Heartbreaker (2000) | Gold (2001) | Demolition (2002) |

Singles from Gold
- 1. "New York, New York" Released: November 26, 2001; 2. "Answering Bell" Released: 2002

Gold is the second studio album by American musician Ryan Adams. It was released September 25, 2001, by Lost Highway Records. The album remains Adams' best-selling album, certifying gold in the UK and going on to sell 364,000 copies in the U.S. and 812,000 worldwide.

Adams received three Grammy Award nominations in 2002: Best Rock Album, Best Male Rock Vocal Performance for "New York, New York", and Best Male Country Vocal Performance for "Lovesick Blues", a song recorded for the Hank Williams tribute album, Timeless.

Adams claimed that "with Gold, I was trying to prove something to myself. I wanted to invent a modern classic." Gold was the number six album of 2001 on The Village Voice's annual Pazz and Jop critic's poll.

== Background ==
Adams intended for the album to be a double album, but his record label, Lost Highway, condensed the album into a single disc. According to Adams, the label "took the last five songs, made it a bonus disc and put it on the first hundred and fifty thousand copies. Fucking my fans over and making them pay extra for a record I wanted to be a double album. They counted that as one record." This bonus disc is known as Side Four; the disc's title reflects the fact that the bonus material makes up the fourth side of the double LP edition of the album.

The album includes "When the Stars Go Blue", which has been covered by artists such as The Corrs and Bono, Tyler Hilton, Bethany Joy Galeotti, Tim McGraw and as a duo by Kurt Nilsen featuring Venke Knutson. "New York, New York" became a notable MTV and VH1 favorite following the September 11 attacks. "The Rescue Blues" was featured in the end credits of the 2001 film Behind Enemy Lines.

Adams' friend and former roommate Adam Duritz (lead singer of Counting Crows) lends background vocals to several tracks.

Stephen King's 2006 book Lisey's Story includes part of the lyrics to "When the Stars Go Blue". Also, the song "The Rescue Blues" was featured in an episode of Scrubs. In 2011, "Answering Bell" was featured in the film and on the soundtrack to Bridesmaids. "La Cienega Just Smiled" was featured in the Angel episode Unleashed.

== Album cover ==
Regarding the album cover, which features Adams standing in front of an upside-down American flag, he told Spin in 2003: "I’m a Democratic Socialist. I really don’t get into the United States at all. I’m sorry, but politically, I really don’t care."

== Critical reception ==
Professional ratings
Aggregate scores
| Source | Rating |
|---|---|
| Metacritic | 78/100 |
Review scores
| Source | Rating |
| AllMusic | 3.5/5 stars |
| Blender | 4/5 stars |
| Entertainment Weekly | B+ |
| The Guardian | 4/5 stars |
| Los Angeles Times | 3/4 stars |
| Pitchfork | 6.0/10 |
| Q | 4/5 stars |
| Rolling Stone | 4/5 stars |
| Uncut | 5/5 stars |
| USA Today | 3/4 stars |

Q listed Gold as one of the best 50 albums of 2001. Kludge included it on their list of the 25 best albums of 2001. Rolling Stone ranked "Gold" the 81st best record of the 2000s. NME ranked Gold at number 193 on its list of The 500 Greatest Albums of All Time.

Gold finished sixth in the 2001 Village Voice Pazz & Jop yearly critics' poll.

== Track listing ==
All tracks are written by Ryan Adams except where noted.

| No. | Title | Writer(s) | Length |
|---|---|---|---|
| 1. | "New York, New York" | | 3:46 |
| 2. | "Firecracker" | | 2:51 |
| 3. | "Answering Bell" | | 3:05 |
| 4. | "La Cienega Just Smiled" | | 5:03 |
| 5. | "The Rescue Blues" | | 3:38 |
| 6. | "Somehow, Someday" | | 4:24 |
| 7. | "When the Stars Go Blue" | | 3:31 |
| 8. | "Nobody Girl" | Adams, Ethan Johns | 9:40 |
| 9. | "Sylvia Plath" | Adams, Richard Causon | 4:10 |
| 10. | "Enemy Fire" | Adams, Gillian Welch | 4:09 |
| 11. | "Gonna Make You Love Me" | | 2:36 |
| 12. | "Wild Flowers" | | 4:59 |
| 13. | "Harder Now That It's Over" | Adams, Chris Stills | 4:32 |
| 14. | "Touch, Feel & Lose" | Adams, David Rawlings | 4:15 |
| 15. | "Tina Toledo's Street Walkin' Blues" | Adams, Johns | 6:10 |
| 16. | "Goodnight, Hollywood Blvd." | Adams, Causon | 3:25 |

Bonus disc: "Side Four"
| No. | Title | Writer(s) | Length |
|---|---|---|---|
| 1. | "Rosalie Come and Go" | | 3:54 |
| 2. | "The Fools We Are as Men" | | 4:01 |
| 3. | "Sweet Black Magic" | Adams, Johns | 2:35 |
| 4. | "The Bar Is a Beautiful Place" | | 5:58 |
| 5. | "Cannonball Days" | | 3:24 |

Bonus disc: "Side Five"
| No. | Title | Length |
|---|---|---|
| 1. | "Mara Lisa" | 3:42 |
| 2. | "From Me to You" | 3:48 |
| 3. | "Touch, Feel & Lose" (live in Amsterdam) | 4:42 |

== Personnel ==
Notes: D1 indicates Disk 1; S4 indicates Side 4

- Ryan Adams – vocals (all tracks) acoustic guitar (D1: tracks 1–8, 11–13; S4: tracks 2, 3, 5). electric guitar (D:1 tracks 8, 10, 14, 15; S4: track 1), banjo (D1: track 3), piano (D1: track 3; S4: tracks 3, 4)
- Bucky Baxter – Steel guitar (D1: tracks 3, 13)
- Andre Carter – trumpet (D1: track 14; S4: track 4)
- Richard Causon – piano (D1: tracks 1, 4, 6, 7, 9, 16)
- Jennifer Condos – bass (D1: tracks 2, 3, 4, 10, 12, 14; S4: tracks 1, 2, 4)
- Milo De Cruz – bass (D1: tracks 8, 11, 15)
- Adam Duritz – choir (D1: tracks 5, 14), background vocals (D1: track 3; S4: track 1)
- Keith Hunter – choir (D1: tracks 5, 14)
- Rami Jaffi – accordion (D1: track 13)
- Ethan Johns – Drums (D1: 1–15; S4: tracks 1, 4), electric guitar (D1: tracks 1, 2, 5, 6; S4: track 1), guitar (D1: track 3), chamberlain strings (D1: tracks 4, 7, 12, 13), lead guitar (D1: tracks 8, 13, 15), Hammond B-3 (D1: tracks 1, 6, 8; S4: track 5), background vocals (D1: tracks 6, 15; S4: track 3), acoustic guitar (D1: tracks 2, 6, 8; S4: track 5), 12-string guitar (D1: tracks 5, 7) mandocello (D1: tracks 6, 7; S4: track 2), vibes (D1: tracks 4, 12), string arrangement (D1: tracks 9, 16), slide guitar (D1: track 15), mandolin (D1: track 13; S4: track 2), bass (D1: track 5), electric piano (D1: track 7), celeste (D1: track 12), harmonium (D1: track 7; S4: track 2), congas (D1: track 1), banjo (S4: track 3)
- Jim Keltner – drums (S4: track 4)
- Rob McDonald – choir (D1: tracks 5, 14)
- Sid Paige – concert master (D1: tracks 9, 16)
- Julianna Raye – background vocals (D1: track 7), choir (D1: tracks 5, 14)
- Chris Stills – background vocals (D1: tracks 2, 6, 8, 13), electric guitar (D1: tracks 8, 11, 15), bass (D1: tracks 1, 13), acoustic guitar (D1: track 4), acoustic 12-string guitar (D1: track 12), guitar (S4: track 1)
- Benmont Tench – Hammond B-3 (D1: tracks 2, 3, 5, 14), piano (D1: tracks 2, 15)
- Kamasi Washington – saxophone (D1: tracks 1, 14; S4: track 4)
- C.C. White – background vocals (D1: tracks 8, 15), choir (D1: tracks 5, 14), solo vocals (D1: track 15)

== Charts ==
=== Album ===
| Country | Peak position |
|---|---|
| US | 59 |
| France | 126 |
| Germany | 51 |
| Ireland | 17 |
| Netherlands | 60 |
| New Zealand | 45 |
| Norway | 6 |
| Sweden | 9 |
| UK | 20 |

=== Singles ===
| Year | Single | Chart | Peak position |
|---|---|---|---|
| 2001 | "New York, New York" | US Billboard Hot 100 | 112 |
| 2001 | "New York, New York" | Dutch Mega Single Top 100 | 83 |
| 2001 | "New York, New York" | UK Singles Chart | 53 |
| 2002 | "Answering Bell" | Dutch Mega Single Top 100 | 92 |
| 2002 | "Answering Bell" | Irish Singles Chart | 49 |
| 2002 | "Answering Bell" | UK Singles Chart | 39 |

== Sales and certifications ==
| Region | Certification | Certified units/sales |
|---|---|---|
| United Kingdom (BPI) | Gold | 218,395 |
