= New York, New York (Ryan Adams song) =

Single by Ryan Adams

from the album Gold
- Released: November 26, 2001
- Genre: Alternative country
- Length: 3:47
- Label: Lost Highway
- Songwriter: Ryan Adams

Ryan Adams singles chronology
"New York, New York" (2001)	"Answering Bell" (2002)

"New York, New York" is the debut solo single by American singer-songwriter Ryan Adams. It was the lead single to his second studio album, Gold (2001).

The song was supposed to be released on September 11, 2001, but following the terrorist attacks, it was postponed to November 26. The single reached No. 53 in the UK in December 2001 and No. 18 on the Adult Top 40 chart in the US. The song earned Adams a Grammy Award nomination for Best Male Rock Vocal Performance.

Following the attacks, the song was seen by many as an inspirational anthem of healing for New York City. Two months after the attack, Adams performed the song on Saturday Night Live.

In 2009, the song was included in The Guardian newspaper's "1000 Songs Everyone Must Hear". It features a closing saxophone solo by a young Kamasi Washington.

== Background ==
Adams wrote the song about an ex-lover from his brief time in New York during his early 20s. A native of North Carolina, he lived in New York two years before the release of the song. The song was written about Amy Lombardi, who also inspired the breakup songs on his debut album Heartbreaker. Adams moved to New York in order to be in a relationship with her. The single, and Adams' second album Gold, were originally scheduled for release on September 11, 2001, but the release date was postponed to November following the terrorist attacks.

The song's lyrics mention several lower Manhattan geographic references, including the intersection of Avenue A and 10th Street (where Adams and Lombardi's apartment was), the Second Avenue subway station, Houston Street, Avenue B, and an Upper West Side church.

After the attacks, Adams decided not to play the song live and requested that the song would not be licensed for media, because he did not want people to feel as if he was exploiting the tragedy for his own personal gain. He made exceptions for the New York Yankees, who played the song during games in the old Yankee Stadium, as well as the NYPD and the New York City Fire Department.

The song was nominated for the 2002 Grammy Award for Best Male Rock Vocal Performance, losing to "Dig In" by Lenny Kravitz.

The closing saxophone solo was played by 20-year-old Kamasi Washington in one of his first studio session appearances. It features two takes being played at the same time, which originated as a playback accident before the producers enjoyed it enough to keep it.

== Music video ==
The video was filmed on September 7, 2001, four days before the September 11 attacks. It was the second video shot for the song. The first one was shot in a taxi cab and was scrapped because Adams felt that it came out badly. As Adams is a self-professed obsessive of the television series Friends, the video's shots of the New York skyline featured the same angles as the series' opening sequence. The video was mostly filmed under the Brooklyn Bridge, and the Twin Towers feature heavily in the background. The closing shot sees Adams stare across the Hudson River, looking directly at the towers. Following the attack, the video was dedicated to all those who died in the terrorist strikes of September 11 and to the rescue workers of the city.

== Personnel ==
- Ryan Adams - vocals, acoustic guitar
- Richard Causon - piano
- Chris Stills - bass
- Kamasi Washington - saxophone
- Ethan Johns - electric guitars, Hammond B-3, congas, drums

== Track listing ==
1. "New York, New York"
2. "Mara Lisa"
3. "From Me to You"

== Chart performance ==
The song peaked at #18 on the U.S. Billboard Adult Top 40 for the week ending February 2, 2002.

Chart (2001–02)	Peak position
Dutch Singles Chart	83
UK Singles Chart	53
U.S. Billboard Hot 100	112
U.S. Billboard Adult Top 40	18
