= Desire (Ryan Adams song) =

Song by Ryan Adams

from the album Demolition
- Released: September 24, 2002
- Genre: Alternative country, Rock
- Length: 3:41
- Label: Lost Highway Records
- Songwriter(s): Ryan Adams
- Producer(s): Ryan Adams

"Desire" is a song by Ryan Adams from his 2002 album Demolition. The song, at the length of 3:41, was not released as a single from the album. It originally attracted little attention, and even though the review site Music Box described it as crossing "U2 with Bob Dylan", several major reviews – like Rolling Stone and The A.V. Club – did not even mention the song.

The song did however gain popularity later on, as a soundtrack for various popular television series. On 26 January 2005 the song was featured on the West Wing episode "King Corn". A year later, on 20 February 2006, it was also used for the House, M.D. episode "Skin Deep". It also played at the TV series John Doe (Episode 9), originally aired 12/6/2002. More recently, it was used on Beauty & the Beast episode 1x16 "Insatiable" aired on 21 March 2013. The song also features in the Nicholas Sparks film The Longest Ride.

== Instruments ==
- Ryan Adams - Vocals, Guitar, Harmonica
- Sheldon Gomberg - Bass
- Ethan Johns - Drums, Ukulele
- Greg Leisz - Steel Guitar
- Julianna Raye - Background vocals
- Chris Stills - B3
