= Brad Clontz =

American baseball player (born 1971)

- Pitcher
- Born: April 25, 1971 (age 54); Stuart, Virginia, U.S.
- Batted: Right Threw: Right

MLB debut
- April 26, 1995, for the Atlanta Braves

Last MLB appearance
- April 30, 2000, for the Pittsburgh Pirates

MLB statistics
- Win–loss record: 22–8
- Earned run average: 4.34
- Strikeouts: 210
- Stats at Baseball Reference

Teams
- Atlanta Braves (1995–1997); Los Angeles Dodgers (1998); New York Mets (1998); Pittsburgh Pirates (1999–2000)

Career highlights and awards
- World Series champion (1995)

John Bradley Clontz (born April 25, 1971) is an American former Major League Baseball (MLB) relief pitcher who played for the Atlanta Braves, Los Angeles Dodgers, New York Mets, and Pittsburgh Pirates between 1995 and 2000.

== Amateur career ==
Clontz was born in Stuart, Virginia. He played college baseball at Virginia Tech and his contributions there earned him a spot in the Virginia Tech Sports Hall of Fame. In 1991, he played collegiate summer baseball with the Wareham Gatemen of the Cape Cod Baseball League, and received the league's Outstanding Relief Pitcher award.

== Professional career ==
Clontz made his major league debut on April 26, 1995. During his career, he pitched for the Atlanta Braves, Los Angeles Dodgers, New York Mets, and Pittsburgh Pirates.

Clontz was a member of the 1995 Atlanta Braves World Series Championship team. He was known for his distinctive sidearm windup and delivery. He last played for the Triple-A affiliate of the Florida Marlins, the Albuquerque Isotopes, in 2006.

== Personal ==
As of 2025, Clontz was employed as vice-president of customer development at Baha Mar Casino in Nassau, Bahamas.
