= Jeff Blauser =

American baseball player (born 1965)

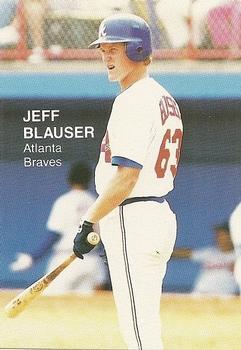
- Shortstop
- Born: November 8, 1965 (age 60); Los Gatos, California, U.S.
- Batted: Right Threw: Right

MLB debut
- July 5, 1987, for the Atlanta Braves

Last MLB appearance
- October 3, 1999, for the Chicago Cubs

MLB statistics
- Batting average: .262
- Home runs: 122
- Runs batted in: 513
- Stats at Baseball Reference

Teams
- Atlanta Braves (1987–1997); Chicago Cubs (1998–1999)

Career highlights and awards
- 2× All-Star (1993, 1997); World Series champion (1995); Silver Slugger Award (1997)

Jeffrey Michael Blauser (/ˈblaʊzər/ BLOW-zər; born November 8, 1965) is an American former professional baseball shortstop. He played in Major League Baseball for the Atlanta Braves and Chicago Cubs from 1987 to 1999.

== Career ==
Blauser went to Placer High School in Auburn, California, and Sacramento City College. He was selected by the Braves in the first round (4th pick) of the 1984 June amateur draft (secondary phase) and made his major league debut on July 5, 1987. Blauser was a powerful right-handed shortstop at 6' 0", 170 lb. He hit well for a middle infielder but was shaky with the glove, which often led him to be replaced on the field in the later innings. In 1993, Blauser had a breakout season, batting over .300 for the first time and scoring 110 runs. He was named to the All-Star team.

During the next few seasons, Blauser's production suffered. In 1995, his .211 batting average was the worst among qualified hitters. He made 23 errors in 1996 and spent half the season on the disabled list. He came back in 1997, however, batting .308 with 17 home runs and 70 runs batted in. He was an All-Star for the second time and also won the Silver Slugger Award for National League shortstops.

After the 1997 season, Blauser signed a 2-year, $8.2 million deal with the Cubs as a free agent. The contract also contained a club option for 2000 worth $7 million. In two years with them, he struggled with injuries and batted under .230. After the 1999 season, the Cubs declined to pick up his 2000 option, opting instead to pay a $200,000 buyout. Blauser retired after the season.

Blauser retired with a lifetime batting average of .262, 122 home runs and 513 RBI. He managed the Mississippi Braves, the AA affiliate of the Atlanta Braves, during the 2006 season.
