= Ryan Klesko =

American baseball player (born 1971)

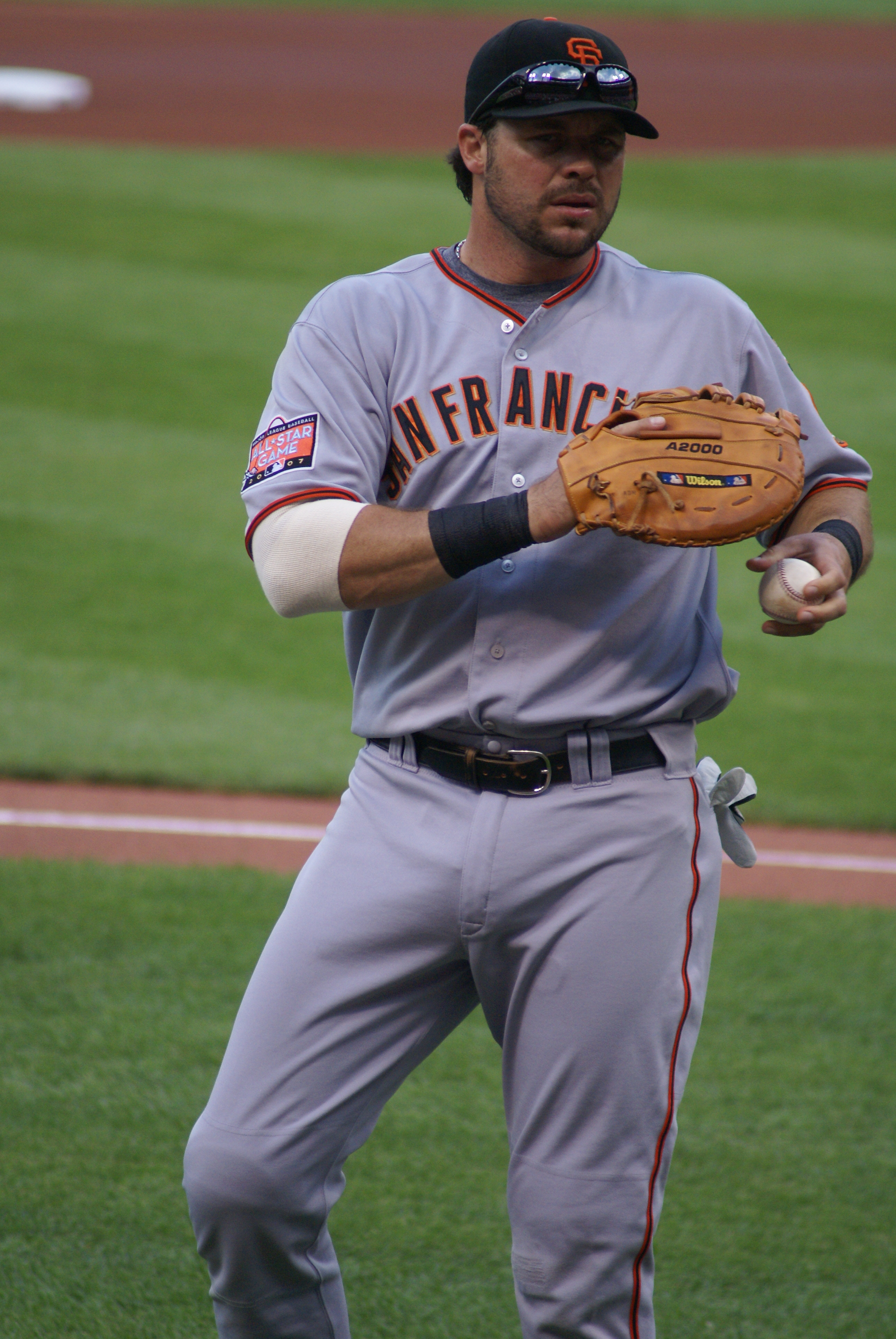
- Klesko with the San Francisco Giants in 2007
- Left fielder / First baseman
- Born: June 12, 1971 (age 55); Westminster, California, U.S.
- Batted: Left Threw: Left

MLB debut
- September 12, 1992, for the Atlanta Braves

Last MLB appearance
- September 29, 2007, for the San Francisco Giants

MLB statistics
- Batting average: .279
- Home runs: 278
- Runs batted in: 987
- Stats at Baseball Reference

Teams
- Atlanta Braves (1992–1999); San Diego Padres (2000–2006); San Francisco Giants (2007)

Career highlights and awards
- All-Star (2001); World Series champion (1995)
Medals
Men's baseball
Representing United States
World Junior Baseball Championship
Gold medal – first place	1988 Sydney	Team

Ryan Anthony Klesko (born June 12, 1971) is an American former Major League Baseball first baseman and corner outfielder who played for the Atlanta Braves, San Diego Padres and San Francisco Giants.

== Early life ==
Klesko was born on June 12, 1971, in Westminster, California. His father was an oilfields worker whom Klesko lost at a young age. His mother, Lorene, worked at an aerospace parts company in Santa Ana and helped Klesko learn to play baseball. When he was nine, she dug a pitcher's mound for him in his backyard. She enrolled him in pitching school with Ron Lefebvre and put on catcher's gear herself to catch Klesko three times a week.

Klesko attended Westminster High School, where even though he hit a lot of home runs, he starred as a pitcher, throwing a ninety-two mile per hour fastball and pitching for the USA Junior Olympic team. He strained a ligament pitching for the junior team at 17, though, and concentrated on hitting thereafter. Klesko signed a letter of intent to play college baseball at Arizona State, but he never did so, instead signing with the Atlanta Braves after the team selected him in the fifth round of the 1989 Major League Baseball (MLB) Draft.

== Professional career ==
Klesko hit a home run in three consecutive World Series games against the Cleveland Indians in Games 3, 4, and 5 of the 1995 World Series. In Game 3, he hit a solo shot off of Charles Nagy in the seventh inning of a 7–6 loss. The Game 4 home run, another solo shot (this time off Ken Hill) put the Braves up 1–0 in the sixth; they would win the game 5–2. In Game 5, his ninth-inning two-run home run to right field off José Mesa was almost caught by his mother; Klesko wound up trading the man who caught it an autographed Greg Maddux baseball for it. The Braves lost that game 5–4, but they beat the Indians for the fourth time in the sixth game to become World Series champions.

Klesko hit at least 21 home runs in eight of his 13 seasons in the major leagues, with a high of 34 homers in 1996. His most productive season came in 2001, when he hit .286 with 30 home runs and posted career highs in RBI (113), runs (105), stolen bases (23) and slugging percentage (.539), and made the National League All-Star team. In 2002, Klesko hit .300 with 29 home runs and 95 RBI, and collected career-highs in hits (162) and doubles (39). Defensively he shuttled around the outfield and first base. In his career, Klesko compiled a .370 on-base percentage with a .500 slugging average, for an .870 OPS. His .525 slugging percentage as a Brave ranks fourth all-time among the team's career leaders, ahead of Eddie Mathews. His .886 OPS as a Brave ranks him fifth among Braves' all-time leaders.

Klesko missed nearly the entire 2006 season due to major shoulder surgery. He returned on September 21, drawing a walk as a pinch-hitter in his first plate appearance. On December 19, 2006, Klesko signed a one-year contract with the San Francisco Giants. Klesko announced his retirement from baseball on April 18, 2008.

== Off the field ==
As of 2019, Klesko serves as a pre-game and post-game analyst for the Atlanta Braves on Fan Duel Sports Network. Klesko has also served as the Padres' spokesperson for the Make-A-Wish Foundation, hosting Make-A-Wish children for batting practice, a pregame ceremony and a ballgame each home stand. Through his Klesko's Korner program, he has regularly provided Padres tickets to children and families facing cancer for the last four years, and he has also been a leading supporter of the Padres Scholars program. Klesko was honored June 19, 2014, with his induction into the National Polish-American Sports Hall of Fame in Troy, Michigan.

Klesko and fellow former Atlanta Braves pitcher John Smoltz were named in a tax dispute involving conservation easement for a 1,546-acre non-cash donation the two made on behalf of a partnership the two formed in the early 1990s. On 25 April 2024, the court cleared the two of fraud charges, but reduced the assessed value of the donated easement to one-tenth of the claimed amount, and imposed a 40% penalty.

== See also ==
- List of Major League Baseball career home run leaders
