= List of neutral site regular season Major League Baseball games played in the United States and Canada =

Major League Baseball (MLB) has played multiple regular season neutral site games in the United States at stadiums that are not the home ballpark of an MLB team. Such contests have been arranged by MLB for marketing purposes since the late 1990s, with increasing frequency. Listed below are the results of those games. Exhibition contests, such as preseason games or postseason all-star games, are not included. Also not included are games played in alternate or temporary home ballparks, such as by the Toronto Blue Jays during their 2020 and 2021 seasons or by the Montreal Expos during their 2003 and 2004 seasons.

== Neutral site games played in the United States ==
Season	Date	Designated visitor	Score	Designated home team	Attendance	Stadium	City	Notes	Ref.
1997	April 19	St. Louis Cardinals	1–0	San Diego Padres	37,382	Aloha Stadium	Honolulu, Hawaii	The 1997 Padres Paradise Series in Honolulu were the first regular-season MLB games played in Hawaii. The April 19 games were a twi-night doubleheader with attendance reported only for the second game.	
1997	April 19	St. Louis Cardinals	2–1	San Diego Padres	37,382	Aloha Stadium	Honolulu, Hawaii	The 1997 Padres Paradise Series in Honolulu were the first regular-season MLB games played in Hawaii. The April 19 games were a twi-night doubleheader with attendance reported only for the second game.	
1997	April 20	St. Louis Cardinals	2–8	San Diego Padres	40,050	Aloha Stadium	Honolulu, Hawaii	The 1997 Padres Paradise Series in Honolulu were the first regular-season MLB games played in Hawaii. The April 19 games were a twi-night doubleheader with attendance reported only for the second game.	
1998	April 15	Anaheim Angels	3–6	New York Yankees	40,743	Shea Stadium	New York City	The New York Yankees moved one game to Shea Stadium in 1998 because Yankee Stadium was temporarily closed for inspections and repairs after a steel beam fell from its upper deck	
2001	April 1	Texas Rangers	1–8	Toronto Blue Jays	19,891	Hiram Bithorn Stadium	San Juan, Puerto Rico	Opening Day game	
2004	September 13	Montreal Expos	3–6	Florida Marlins	4,003	U.S. Cellular Field	Chicago, Illinois	The Florida Marlins moved two games with the Montreal Expos in September 2004 to U.S. Cellular Field in Chicago due to Hurricane Ivan.	
2004	September 14	Montreal Expos	6-8	Florida Marlins	5,457	U.S. Cellular Field	Chicago, Illinois	The Florida Marlins moved two games with the Montreal Expos in September 2004 to U.S. Cellular Field in Chicago due to Hurricane Ivan.	
2007	April 10	Los Angeles Angels	6–7	Cleveland Indians	19,031	Miller Park	Milwaukee, Wisconsin	The Cleveland Indians moved three of their 2007 games to Milwaukee due to a heavy snowstorm in Cleveland.	
2007	April 11	Los Angeles Angels	4–1	Cleveland Indians	16,375	Miller Park	Milwaukee, Wisconsin	The Cleveland Indians moved three of their 2007 games to Milwaukee due to a heavy snowstorm in Cleveland.	
2007	April 12	Los Angeles Angels	2–4	Cleveland Indians	17,090	Miller Park	Milwaukee, Wisconsin	The Cleveland Indians moved three of their 2007 games to Milwaukee due to a heavy snowstorm in Cleveland.	
2007	May 15	Texas Rangers	3–4	Tampa Bay Devil Rays	8,443	The Ballpark at Disney's; Wide World of Sports (Note: The Ballpark at Disney's Wide World of Sports and Champion Stadium are different names, for sponsorship reasons, of the same stadium.)	Lake Buena Vista, Florida		
2007	May 16	Texas Rangers	8–11	Tampa Bay Devil Rays	8,839	The Ballpark at Disney's; Wide World of Sports	Lake Buena Vista, Florida		
2007	May 17	Texas Rangers	6–8	Tampa Bay Devil Rays	9,635	The Ballpark at Disney's; Wide World of Sports	Lake Buena Vista, Florida		
2008	April 22	Toronto Blue Jays	4–6	Tampa Bay Rays	8,269	Champion Stadium	Lake Buena Vista, Florida		
2008	April 23	Toronto Blue Jays	3–5	Tampa Bay Rays	8,989	Champion Stadium	Lake Buena Vista, Florida		
2008	April 24	Toronto Blue Jays	3–5	Tampa Bay Rays	9,540	Champion Stadium	Lake Buena Vista, Florida		
2008	September 14	Chicago Cubs	5–0	Houston Astros	23,441	Miller Park	Milwaukee, Wisconsin	The Houston Astros moved two of their 2008 games to Milwaukee due to the effects of Hurricane Ike. Game 1 featured the first neutral-site no-hitter, thrown by Chicago Cubs pitcher Carlos Zambrano.	
2008	September 15	Chicago Cubs	6–1	Houston Astros	15,158	Miller Park	Milwaukee, Wisconsin	The Houston Astros moved two of their 2008 games to Milwaukee due to the effects of Hurricane Ike. Game 1 featured the first neutral-site no-hitter, thrown by Chicago Cubs pitcher Carlos Zambrano.	
2010	June 28	New York Mets	3–10	Florida Marlins	18,073	Hiram Bithorn Stadium	San Juan, Puerto Rico		
2010	June 29	New York Mets	6–7	Florida Marlins	18,373	Hiram Bithorn Stadium	San Juan, Puerto Rico		
2010	June 30	New York Mets	6–5	Florida Marlins	19,232	Hiram Bithorn Stadium	San Juan, Puerto Rico		
2017	August 29	Texas Rangers	12–2	Houston Astros	3,485	Tropicana Field	St. Petersburg, Florida	Due to Hurricane Harvey, the 2017 Houston Astros moved their August 29–31 series with the Texas Rangers to Tropicana Field in St. Petersburg, Florida.	
2017	August 30	Texas Rangers	8–1	Houston Astros	6,123	Tropicana Field	St. Petersburg, Florida	Due to Hurricane Harvey, the 2017 Houston Astros moved their August 29–31 series with the Texas Rangers to Tropicana Field in St. Petersburg, Florida.	
2017	August 31	Texas Rangers	1–5	Houston Astros	3,385	Tropicana Field	St. Petersburg, Florida	Due to Hurricane Harvey, the 2017 Houston Astros moved their August 29–31 series with the Texas Rangers to Tropicana Field in St. Petersburg, Florida.	
2017	September 11	New York Yankees	5–1	Tampa Bay Rays	15,327	Citi Field	New York City	Due to Hurricane Irma, the 2017 Tampa Bay Rays moved their September 11–13 series with the New York Yankees from Tropicana Field to Citi Field in New York City.	
2017	September 12	New York Yankees	1–2	Tampa Bay Rays	21,024	Citi Field	New York City	Due to Hurricane Irma, the 2017 Tampa Bay Rays moved their September 11–13 series with the New York Yankees from Tropicana Field to Citi Field in New York City.	
2017	September 13	New York Yankees	3–2	Tampa Bay Rays	13,159	Citi Field	New York City	Due to Hurricane Irma, the 2017 Tampa Bay Rays moved their September 11–13 series with the New York Yankees from Tropicana Field to Citi Field in New York City.	
2018	April 17	Cleveland Indians	6–1	Minnesota Twins	19,516	Hiram Bithorn Stadium	San Juan, Puerto Rico		
2018	April 18	Cleveland Indians	1–2	Minnesota Twins	19,537	Hiram Bithorn Stadium	San Juan, Puerto Rico		
2026	September 27	Chicago Cubs	6-2	Boston Red Sox	20,411	Tropicana Field	St. Petersburg, Florida	Due to a Nor'easter that struck much of the Northeastern United States over the weekend of Sept. 25-27, 2026, MLB made the decision to move the Red Sox and Cubs' final game of the 2026 regular season to Tropicana Field, with the Red Sox serving as the home team.	

== Specialty Games (2016–present) ==
Beginning with the Fort Bragg Game in 2016, MLB uses the term Specialty Games to refer to neutral-site games during the regular season in the U.S. and Canada. Other specialty games include the MLB Little League Classic, MLB in Omaha, MLB at Field of Dreams, MLB at Rickwood Field, and the MLB Speedway Classic.

Season	Date	Event	Designated visitor	Score	Designated home team	Attendance	Stadium	City	TV	Ref.
2016	July 3 (Note: The 2016 Fort Bragg game was the first MLB game played on an active military base and the first MLB game played in the state of North Carolina. Only veterans, active military personnel, and family were allowed to be spectators at the game.)	Fort Bragg Game	Miami Marlins	5–2	Atlanta Braves	12,582	Fort Bragg Stadium	Fort Bragg, North Carolina	ESPN	
2017	August 20	MLB Little League Classic (Note: Inaugural)	St. Louis Cardinals	3–6	Pittsburgh Pirates	2,596	Bowman Field	Williamsport, Pennsylvania	ESPN	
2018	August 19	MLB Little League Classic	New York Mets	8–2	Philadelphia Phillies	2,429	Bowman Field	Williamsport, Pennsylvania	ESPN	
2019	June 13 (Note: The 2019 MLB in Omaha game was the first MLB game played in the state of Nebraska and was meant to unify both College and Major League Baseball.)	MLB in Omaha	Detroit Tigers	3–7	Kansas City Royals	25,454	TD Ameritrade Park (Note: Now Charles Schwab Field Omaha)	Omaha, Nebraska	ESPN	
2019	August 18	MLB Little League Classic	Chicago Cubs	7–1	Pittsburgh Pirates	2,503	Bowman Field	Williamsport, Pennsylvania	ESPN	
2021	August 12 (Note: The 2021 MLB at Field of Dreams Game was the first MLB game played in the state of Iowa. A random drawing for the opportunity to purchase tickets for the game directly from MLB was restricted to residents of Iowa.)	MLB at Field of Dreams (Note: Inaugural)	New York Yankees	8–9	Chicago White Sox	7,832	Field of Dreams	Dyersville, Iowa	Fox	
2021	August 22	MLB Little League Classic	Los Angeles Angels	0–3	Cleveland Indians	1,832	Bowman Field	Williamsport, Pennsylvania	ESPN	
2022	August 11	MLB at Field of Dreams	Chicago Cubs	4–2	Cincinnati Reds	7,823	Field of Dreams	Dyersville, Iowa	Fox	
2022	August 21	MLB Little League Classic	Boston Red Sox	3–5	Baltimore Orioles	2,467	Bowman Field	Williamsport, Pennsylvania	ESPN	
2023	August 20	MLB Little League Classic	Philadelphia Phillies	3–4	Washington Nationals	2,473	Bowman Field	Williamsport, Pennsylvania	ESPN	
2024	June 20 (Note: The 2024 MLB at Rickwood Field game was the first MLB game played in the state of Alabama. Rickwood Field is the oldest existing professional ballpark in the United States and was the home of the Birmingham Black Barons of the Negro leagues. It was scheduled a replacement for the Field of Dreams game due to construction at the site in Iowa.)	MLB at Rickwood Field	San Francisco Giants (Note: Playing as the San Francisco Sea Lions)	5–6	St. Louis Cardinals (Note: Playing as the St. Louis Stars)	8,332	Rickwood Field	Birmingham, Alabama	Fox	
2024	August 18	MLB Little League Classic	New York Yankees	2–3	Detroit Tigers	2,532	Bowman Field	Williamsport, Pennsylvania	ESPN	
2025	August 2–3 (Note: The 2025 MLB Speedway Classic game was the first MLB game played in the state of Tennessee. The game was suspended in the bottom of the first inning due to water on the field, and it resumed the following day.)	MLB Speedway Classic	Atlanta Braves	4–2	Cincinnati Reds	91,032	Bristol Motor Speedway	Bristol, Tennessee	Fox	
2025	August 17	MLB Little League Classic	Seattle Mariners	3–7	New York Mets	2,518	Bowman Field	Williamsport, Pennsylvania	ESPN	
2026	August 13	MLB at Field of Dreams	Philadelphia Phillies	7–1	Minnesota Twins	7,163	Field of Dreams	Dyersville, Iowa	Netflix	
2026	August 23	MLB Little League Classic	Atlanta Braves	4–2	Milwaukee Brewers		Bowman Field	Williamsport, Pennsylvania	ESPN	

== See also ==
- List of Major League Baseball games played outside the United States and Canada
