= Alan Porter =

American baseball umpire (born 1977)

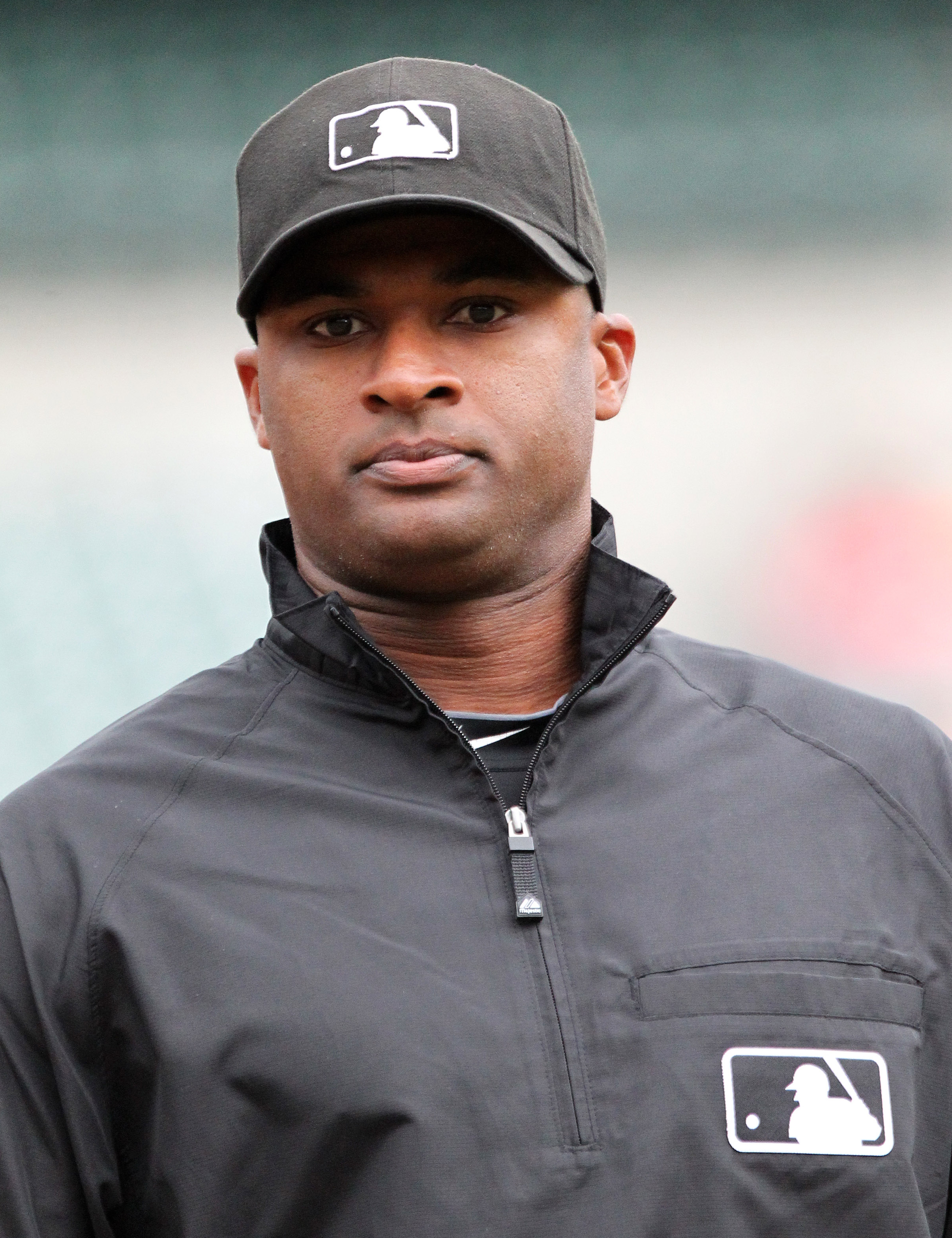
- Porter in 2011

MLB – No. 64
- Umpire
- Born: December 18, 1977 (age 48); Philadelphia, Pennsylvania, U.S.

MLB debut
- April 5, 2010

Crew information
- Umpiring crew: D
- Crew members: #64 Alan Porter (crew chief); #28 Jim Wolf; #40 Roberto Ortiz; #9 Alex MacKay

Career highlights and awards
- Special assignments: World Series (2019, 2022, 2025); League Championship Series (2018, 2020, 2021, 2024, 2026); Division Series (2014, 2015, 2016, 2017, 2019, 2022, 2025); Wild Card Games/Series (2018, 2020, 2021, 2023, 2024, 2026); All-Star Games (2015, 2026); World Baseball Classic (2023); MLB Little League Classic (2019, 2021, 2023); MLB in Omaha (2019); MLB at Rickwood Field (2024)

Alan Dwayne Porter Jr. (born December 18, 1977) is an American Major League Baseball umpire. He umpired his first Major League game on April 5, 2010. He wears uniform number 64.

== Umpiring career ==
Porter's Major League umpiring debut was in early 2010 and he umpired a total of 35 major league games that season. He returned in 2011 to officiate in 121 big league games. Porter was hired to the full-time MLB staff in January 2013. Porter was the home plate umpire for Jordan Zimmermann's (Washington Nationals) no-hitter against the Miami Marlins on the last day of the 2014 regular season. Porter's first postseason assignment was the 2014 NLDS between the St. Louis Cardinals and the Los Angeles Dodgers. Porter later served as the right field umpire in the 2015 MLB All-Star Game in Cincinnati.

Porter was chosen as one of the umpires for the 2019 World Series, his first, between the Houston Astros and the Washington Nationals. Porter was the home plate umpire for Game 1, right field umpire for Game 2, and served as the replay official for the remainder of the series. Porter was selected to work his second World Series in 2022, and was promoted to crew chief in 2023.

=== Injury ===
On August 15, 2010, Porter was forced to leave a Houston Astros – Pittsburgh Pirates game in which he was serving as the home plate umpire after he was struck on the head by Carlos Lee's bat while Lee was following through with his swing.

== Personal ==
Porter has two sons Alan III (Trey) and Alexander.

Porter graduated from Hatboro-Horsham High School in Horsham, Pennsylvania in 1995.

== See also ==
- List of Major League Baseball umpires (disambiguation)
