= John Libka =

American baseball umpire (born 1987)

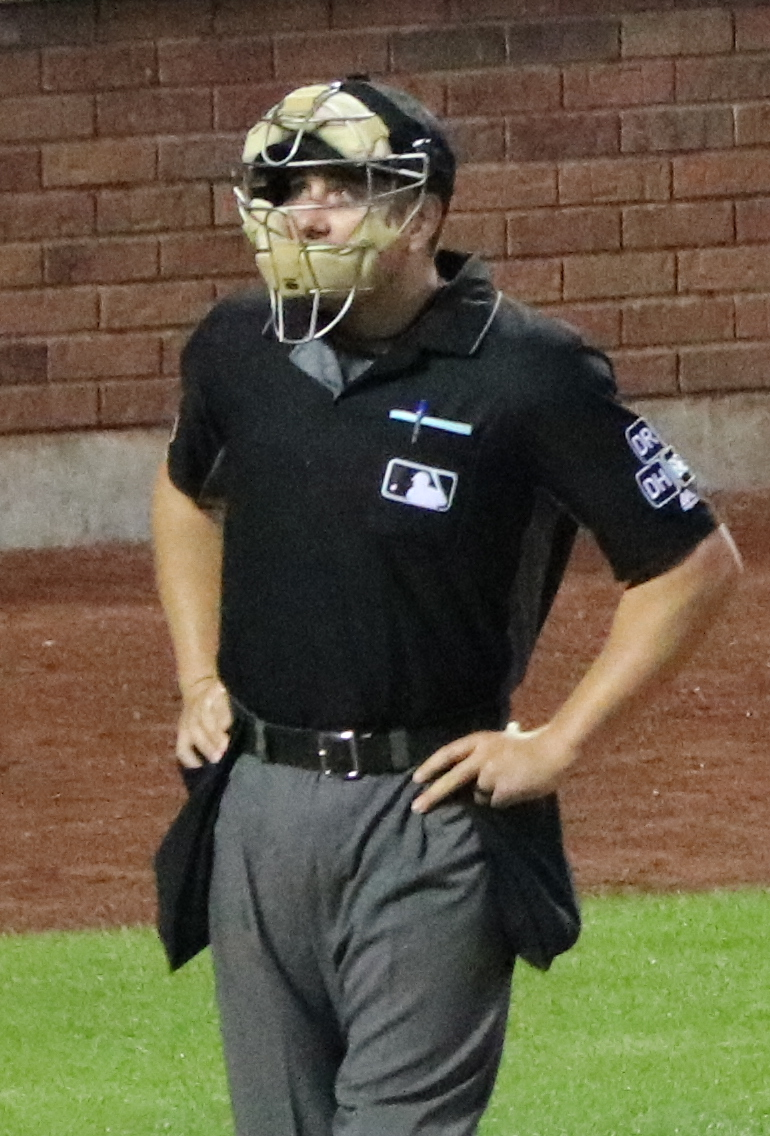
- Libka in 2018

MLB – No. 84
- Umpire
- Born: June 13, 1987 (age 39); Saginaw, Michigan, U.S.

MLB debut
- May 27, 2017
- Stats at Baseball Reference

Crew information
- Umpiring crew: E
- Crew members: #92 James Hoye (crew chief); #17 D. J. Reyburn; #84 John Libka; #29 Sean Barber

Career highlights and awards
- Special Assignments: League Championship Series (2025); Division Series (2023, 2024); Wild Card Games/Series (2022, 2025, 2026); MLB in Omaha (2019)

John Libka (born June 13, 1987) is an American Major League Baseball umpire.

== Biography ==
Libka was born on June 13, 1987, in Saginaw, Michigan, to Gary and Lori Libka. He grew up in Mayville, Michigan, and attended high school at the Juniata Christian School in Vassar, Michigan. Libka played baseball through his junior year in high school before beginning to umpire through the Michigan High School Athletic Association's Legacy Program. Under the direction of his father, Gary, Libka officiated his first games at age 16. After high school, Libka attended Pensacola Christian College, graduating with a degree in education. After a teaching internship, Libka decided to return to umpiring, attending the Wendelstedt Umpire School and graduating in 2010. Libka now is an instructor at the Wendelstedt School.

== Professional career ==
Libka made his Major League Baseball debut on May 27, 2017, umpiring a doubleheader in which the Detroit Tigers visited the Chicago White Sox. On July 6, 2017, he ejected his first player, sending the Houston Astros' Marwin González off the field for arguing balls and strikes. Through the 2018 regular season he was found to be the best performing home plate umpire in terms of accuracy in calling balls and strikes, with an error rate of 7.59 percent, and second best in 2018 alone, with an error rate of 7.33 percent. This was based on a study conducted at Boston University where 372,442 pitches were analyzed. Through the end of the 2021 season, Libka was used in the majors as a substitute, also known as a "callup" umpire. He was officially hired by MLB starting with the 2022 season.
