= Padres Paradise Series =

Three-game series between the Cardinals and Padres in Honolulu, Hawaii in 1997

1997 Padres Paradise Series
- Teams: St. Louis Cardinals; San Diego Padres
- Date: April 19, 1997 – April 20, 1997; 4:09 p.m. HST (Saturday, April 19); 7:17 p.m. HST (Saturday, April 19); 2:05 p.m. HST (Sunday, April 20)
- Venue: Aloha Stadium
- City: Honolulu, Hawaii
- Managers: Tony La Russa (St. Louis Cardinals); Bruce Bochy (San Diego Padres)
- Umpires: Wally Bell; Jerry Crawford; Tom Hallion; Ed Montague
- Attendance: 37,382 (games 1 & 2); 40,050 (game 3)
- Time of game: 2:36 (game 1); 2:34 (game 2); 2:53 (game 3)

The Padres Paradise Series was a three-game Major League Baseball regular season series between the San Diego Padres and St. Louis Cardinals, held on April 19 and 20, 1997, at Aloha Stadium in Honolulu, Hawaii, United States. These were the first regular-season major league games played in the state. The Padres were the home team for all three games. The Cardinals won the opening two games (a twi-night doubleheader) on April 19, winning the first 1–0 and the second 2–1. The Padres won the third game on April 20 by a score of 8–2. Reported attendances were 37,382 (games 1 & 2) and 40,050 (game 3).

The Padres front office saw the series as a test run for future exhibition games in Hawaii. The Padres had played an exhibition series at Aloha Stadium in 1975 against Japan's Seibu Lions. The Padres arrived in Hawaii with an 8–5 record. The three-game series began a stretch in which they lost 10 of 11 and dropped below .500 for the rest of the season.

== Participating teams ==
The Padres first asked the Houston Astros to move a series from San Diego to Honolulu, but the Astros declined. The Padres then turned to the Cardinals.

== Rosters ==
=== St. Louis Cardinals 1997 roster ===
1997 St. Louis Cardinals
Roster
Pitchers: 38 Manny Aybar; 44 Rich Batchelor; 33 José Bautista; 53 Rigo Beltrán; 41 Alan Benes; 40 Andy Benes; 54 Mike Busby; 43 Dennis Eckersley; 48 Tony Fossas; 50 John Frascatore; 32 Rick Honeycutt; 29 Danny Jackson; 57 Curtis King; 34 Sean Lowe; 54 Eric Ludwick; 33 T. J. Mathews; 61 Tom McGraw; 35 Matt Morris; 31 Donovan Osborne; 28 Lance Painter; 46 Mark Petkovsek; 64 Brady Raggio; 30 Todd Stottlemyre; 34 Fernando Valenzuela	Catchers: 37 Mike DiFelice; 49 Tom Lampkin; 26 Eli Marrero; 19 Tom Pagnozzi; Infielders: 27 David Bell; 56 Jeff Berblinger; 11 Royce Clayton; 7 Delino DeShields; 8 Gary Gaetti; 22 Mike Gallego; 53 Mike Gulan; 29 Scott Livingstone; 25 Mark McGwire; 67 Roberto Mejía; 52 Luis Ordaz; 38 Steve Scarsone; 12 Danny Sheaffer; 24 Dmitri Young	Outfielders: 68 Micah Franklin; 5 Ron Gant; 22 Scarborough Green; 3 Brian Jordan; 16 Ray Lankford; 47 John Mabry; 51 Willie McGee; 23 Phil Plantier; 23 Mark Sweeney	Manager: 10 Tony La Russa; Coaches: 18 Dave Duncan (Pitching); 34 Mark DeJohn (Bullpen); 25 George Hendrick (Hitting); 15 Rene Lachemann (Third Base); 4 Carney Lansford (Bench); 39 Dave McKay (First Base)

=== San Diego Padres 1997 roster ===
1997 San Diego Padres
Roster
Pitchers: 43 Andy Ashby; 46 Rich Batchelor; 40,44 Sean Bergman; 45 Doug Bochtler; 55 Jim Bruske; 33 Terry Burrows; 39 Will Cunnane; 44 Todd Erdos; 50 Joey Hamilton; 41 Sterling Hitchcock; 51 Trevor Hoffman; 34 Danny Jackson; 32 Marc Kroon; 52 Joey Long; 54 Paul Menhart; 48 Heath Murray; 54 Tim Scott; 47 Pete Smith; 34 Fernando Valenzuela; 53 Darío Veras; 36 Tim Worrell	Catchers: 23 John Flaherty; 9,65 Carlos Hernández; 3 Mandy Romero; 14 Don Slaught; Infielders: 14 George Arias; 21 Ken Caminiti; 29 Archi Cianfrocco; 10 Chris Gomez; 22 Wally Joyner; 27 Derrek Lee; 8 Scott Livingstone; 18 Craig Shipley; 26 Terry Shumpert; 13 Jorge Velandia; 4 Quilvio Veras	Outfielders: 31 Trey Beamon; 12 Steve Finley; 19 Tony Gwynn; 24 Rickey Henderson; 20 Chris Jones; 7 Phil Plantier; 28 Rubén Rivera; 8 Mark Sweeney; 25 Greg Vaughn	Manager: 15 Bruce Bochy; Coaches: 38 Greg Booker (bullpen); 11 Tim Flannery (third base); 42 Davey Lopes (first base); 5 Rob Picciolo (bench); 16 Merv Rettenmund (hitting); 37 Dan Warthen (pitching)

== Venue ==
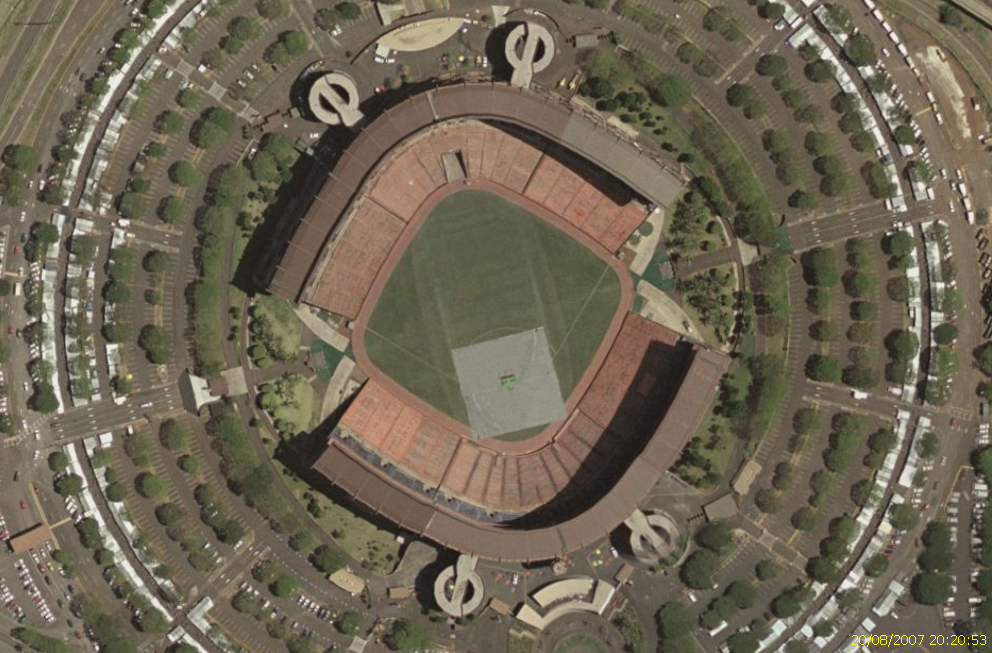
Aerial view of Aloha Stadium in its baseball/soccer configuration

== Broadcasting ==
The Sunday game was nationally televised on ESPN's Sunday Night Baseball.

== Series summary ==
The series was composed of three Padres regular season home games relocated from San Diego.

=== Game 1 ===
The first game was held on Saturday, April 19, 1997, at 4:09 p.m. HST.

Team	1	2	3	4	5	6	7	8	9	R	H	E
St. Louis Cardinals	0	0	0	0	0	1	0	0	0	1	7	0
San Diego Padres	0	0	0	0	0	0	0	0	0	0	6	2
WP: Mark Petkovsek (2-2) LP: Sterling Hitchcock (2-1) Sv: Dennis Eckersley (3); Attendance: 37,382; Notes: Game duration 2:36; Boxscore

=== Game 2 ===
The second game was held on Saturday, April 19, 1997, at 7:17 p.m. HST.

Team	1	2	3	4	5	6	7	8	9	R	H	E
St. Louis Cardinals	0	2	0	0	0	0	0	0	0	2	7	0
San Diego Padres	0	0	0	0	0	0	0	0	1	1	3	2
WP: Alan Benes (2-1) LP: WP: Tim Worrell (1-2); Attendance: 37,382; Notes: Game duration 2:34; Boxscore

=== Game 3 ===
The third game was held on Sunday, April 20, 1997, at 2:05 p.m. HST.

Team	1	2	3	4	5	6	7	8	9	R	H	E
St. Louis Cardinals	0	0	1	1	0	0	0	0	0	2	9	0
San Diego Padres	2	0	1	4	0	0	1	0	X	8	12	0
WP: Andy Ashby (1-1) LP: Brady Raggio (1-1); Home runs: StL: Ron Gant (2, off Andy Ashby, 4th inn, 0 on, 2 outs to Deep LF-CF). SD: None; Attendance: 40,050; Notes: Game duration 2:53; Boxscore

== See also ==
- List of neutral site regular season Major League Baseball games played in the United States and Canada
- List of Major League Baseball games played outside the United States and Canada
