= Lambert Bartak =

Baseball stadium organist (1919–2013)

- Born: April 8, 1919; Clarkson, Nebraska
- Died: November 3, 2013 (aged 94); San Diego, California
- Occupation: Organist
- Years active: 1955–2010
- Known for: College World Series organist; Omaha Royals organist

Lambert James Bartak (April 8, 1919 – November 3, 2013) was an American organist, best known for playing at the College World Series.

== Biography ==
Bartak was the full-time organist for the NCAA Division I College World Series at Johnny Rosenblatt Stadium in Omaha, Nebraska. He played full-time for the series from 1983 through his retirement in 2010. He had first played the organ for the event in 1955.

Bartak also played the organ for the minor league Omaha Royals from 1973 to 2002. Bartak performed in one of the few stadiums that still featured live music, as most stadiums had switched to prerecorded music. His image was often shown on the video screens at Rosenblatt and on broadcasts of the games.

Bartak is one of three organists to be ejected from a baseball game, the others being Wilbur Snapp in 1985 and Derek Dye in 2012. During an Omaha Royals game on May 26, 1988, Royals catcher Larry Owen argued a call with home plate umpire Ángel Hernandez. Manager Glenn Ezell joined the fray and, during the argument, Bartak played the theme song from The Mickey Mouse Club. After Bartak played the spelling portion of the song, "M-I-C-K-E-Y M-O-U-S-E", another umpire, Tony Maners, motioned to the press box ejecting Bartak. Coincidentally, Maners later umpired during the 2006 College World Series.

Bartak retired following the 2010 College World Series, ending his career with the ballpark he loved, Johnny Rosenblatt Stadium. TD Ameritrade Park, when it opened in 2011, ushered in the era of Omaha, Nebraska, native Jerry Pawlak as Bartak's successor at the organ. The original organ that Bartak played at Rosenblatt has been restored and is being used at TD Ameritrade Park.

Bartak was born in Clarkson, Nebraska, in 1919. His father was a Czech immigrant to the United States. Bartak served in the United States Army during World War II, playing in a military band. He died in San Diego at the age of 94 in 2013.
