= 2019 Major League Baseball season =

2019 MLB season
- League: Major League Baseball
- Sport: Baseball
- Duration: March 20 – October 30, 2019
- Games: 162
- Teams: 30
- TV partner(s): Fox/FS1; TBS; ESPN; MLB Network

Draft
- Top draft pick: Adley Rutschman
- Picked by: Baltimore Orioles

Regular season
- Season MVP: AL: Mike Trout (LAA); NL: Cody Bellinger (LAD)

Postseason
- AL champions: Houston Astros
- AL runners-up: New York Yankees
- NL champions: Washington Nationals
- NL runners-up: St. Louis Cardinals

World Series
- Champions: Washington Nationals
- Runners-up: Houston Astros
- World Series MVP: Stephen Strasburg (WSH)

MLB seasons
- ← 2018 2020 →

Locations of AL teams for the 2013–2019 MLB seasons
West Central East
Locations of NL teams for the 2017–present MLB seasons
West Central East

The 2019 Major League Baseball season began on March 20, while the regular season ended on September 29. It was the 150th anniversary of professional baseball, dating back to the 1869 foundation of the Cincinnati Red Stockings. The postseason began on October 1. The World Series began October 22 and ended October 30 with the Washington Nationals defeating the Houston Astros in seven games to win their first World Series championship. The entire schedule was released on August 22, 2018.

The 90th Major League Baseball All-Star Game was held on July 9 at Progressive Field, home of the Cleveland Indians. The American League won, 4–3, for its seventh straight victory.

This was the final season when anyone on the 40-man expanded roster could be used in games from September 1 through the end of the regular season (so-called September call-ups).

== Schedule ==
As has been the case since 2013, teams were scheduled to play 19 games against each division opponent for a total of 76 games, and six or seven games against each team from the other two divisions for a total of 66 games. The primary inter-league match-ups were AL East vs NL West, AL Central vs NL East and AL West vs NL Central.

The season began on March 20 and 21 with the Oakland Athletics and the Seattle Mariners playing in Tokyo, Japan, at the Tokyo Dome.

Excluding international openers, March 28 was the earliest Opening Day in history. The previous earliest date was March 29 of the 2018 season.

The second annual Mexico Series of games featured four matchups during the season. The first featured the St. Louis Cardinals and the Cincinnati Reds at Monterrey, Mexico's Estadio de Béisbol Monterrey on April 13 and 14. The other series, also in Monterrey, featured two games between the Houston Astros and the Los Angeles Angels on May 4 and 5.

The Kansas City Royals faced the Detroit Tigers at Charles Schwab Field Omaha in Omaha, Nebraska, on June 13 for the MLB in Omaha game, only two days before the College World Series. This was the first MLB game played in the state of Nebraska.

The MLB London Series featured the New York Yankees and Boston Red Sox at London Stadium in London, on June 29 and 30 making it the first regular season series played in London, under a two-year commitment.

The MLB Little League Classic at Muncy Bank Ballpark at Historic Bowman Field in Williamsport, Pennsylvania, coinciding with the Little League World Series, returned to the schedule for the third straight year. It was played between the Chicago Cubs and Pittsburgh Pirates on August 18.

== Spring training ==
Spring training for the 2019 season began in late February and lasted through late March. Teams began workouts and practice for spring training beginning in mid February. Pitchers and catchers reported first, followed by position players a few days later.

Prior to the start of the regular season, each team played between 22 and 35 spring training games, beginning on February 22. There were several times during spring training where a team had two different squads playing different teams simultaneously. In addition to spring training games, teams occasionally played exhibition games with non-MLB teams, such as Minor League Baseball teams, independent teams, or college teams. These exhibition games were not counted in spring training standings. Spring training ended on March 26, two days before the Opening Day.

== Standings ==
=== American League ===
AL East
Team	W	L	Pct.	GB	Home	Road
^{(2)} New York Yankees	103	59	.636	—	57‍–‍24	46‍–‍35
^{(5)} Tampa Bay Rays	96	66	.593	7	48‍–‍33	48‍–‍33
Boston Red Sox	84	78	.519	19	38‍–‍43	46‍–‍35
Toronto Blue Jays	67	95	.414	36	35‍–‍46	32‍–‍49
Baltimore Orioles	54	108	.333	49	25‍–‍56	29‍–‍52

AL Central
Team	W	L	Pct.	GB	Home	Road
^{(3)} Minnesota Twins	101	61	.623	—	46‍–‍35	55‍–‍26
Cleveland Indians	93	69	.574	8	49‍–‍32	44‍–‍37
Chicago White Sox	72	89	.447	28½	39‍–‍41	33‍–‍48
Kansas City Royals	59	103	.364	42	31‍–‍50	28‍–‍53
Detroit Tigers	47	114	.292	53½	22‍–‍59	25‍–‍55

AL West
Team	W	L	Pct.	GB	Home	Road
^{(1)} Houston Astros	107	55	.660	—	60‍–‍21	47‍–‍34
^{(4)} Oakland Athletics	97	65	.599	10	52‍–‍29	45‍–‍36
Texas Rangers	78	84	.481	29	45‍–‍36	33‍–‍48
Los Angeles Angels	72	90	.444	35	38‍–‍43	34‍–‍47
Seattle Mariners	68	94	.420	39	35‍–‍46	33‍–‍48

=== National League ===
NL East
Team	W	L	Pct.	GB	Home	Road
^{(2)} Atlanta Braves	97	65	.599	—	50‍–‍31	47‍–‍34
^{(4)} Washington Nationals	93	69	.574	4	50‍–‍31	43‍–‍38
New York Mets	86	76	.531	11	48‍–‍33	38‍–‍43
Philadelphia Phillies	81	81	.500	16	45‍–‍36	36‍–‍45
Miami Marlins	57	105	.352	40	30‍–‍51	27‍–‍54

NL Central
Team	W	L	Pct.	GB	Home	Road
^{(3)} St. Louis Cardinals	91	71	.562	—	50‍–‍31	41‍–‍40
^{(5)} Milwaukee Brewers	89	73	.549	2	49‍–‍32	40‍–‍41
Chicago Cubs	84	78	.519	7	51‍–‍30	33‍–‍48
Cincinnati Reds	75	87	.463	16	41‍–‍40	34‍–‍47
Pittsburgh Pirates	69	93	.426	22	35‍–‍46	34‍–‍47

NL West
Team	W	L	Pct.	GB	Home	Road
^{(1)} Los Angeles Dodgers	106	56	.654	—	59‍–‍22	47‍–‍34
Arizona Diamondbacks	85	77	.525	21	44‍–‍37	41‍–‍40
San Francisco Giants	77	85	.475	29	35‍–‍46	42‍–‍39
Colorado Rockies	71	91	.438	35	43‍–‍38	28‍–‍53
San Diego Padres	70	92	.432	36	36‍–‍45	34‍–‍47

== Postseason ==
=== Bracket ===
Wild Card Games (ALWC, NLWC)
4	Oakland	0
5	Tampa Bay	1
4	Washington	1
5	Milwaukee	0

Division Series (ALDS, NLDS)
1	Houston	3
5	Tampa Bay	2
American League
2	NY Yankees	3
3	Minnesota	0
1	LA Dodgers	2
4	Washington	3
National League
2	Atlanta	2
3	St. Louis	3

League Championship Series (ALCS, NLCS)
1	Houston	4
2	NY Yankees	2
4	Washington	4
3	St. Louis	0

World Series
AL1	Houston	3
NL4	Washington	4

== Managerial changes ==
=== General managers ===
==== Offseason ====
Team	Former GM	Reason for leaving	New GM	Notes
New York Mets	Sandy Alderson	Health	Brodie Van Wagenen	On June 26, 2018, Alderson took a permanent leave of absence due to recurrence of cancer. He was hired as general manager in 2010 and saw the team win the National League pennant in 2015. On October 28, 2018, after having three interims finish the rest of the season, the Mets agreed to have former agent Brodie Van Wagenen be their 13th general manager in franchise history.
San Francisco Giants	Bobby Evans	Fired	Scott Harris	On September 24, 2018, the Giants fired Bobby Evans after almost four seasons as general manager. The Giants made the playoffs in 2016, but are 166–224 (.426) since taking a major league-best 57–33 (.633) record into the All-Star break that year.
Baltimore Orioles	Dan Duquette	Contract not renewed	Mike Elias	On October 3, 2018, the team announced that Duquette, along with manager Buck Showalter, would not be retained for the 2019 season after the Orioles had the worst record in franchise history at 47–115 (.290). Duquette was hired as general manager after the 2011 season. On November 16, 2018, Mike Elias was named the team's new general manager.
Los Angeles Dodgers	Farhan Zaidi	Resigned	N/A	On November 7, 2018, Zaidi left the Dodgers to become the President of Baseball Operations for the San Francisco Giants. Since taking over in 2014, he oversaw the Dodgers win the NL West all five times, and the NL pennant twice from 2017 to 2018.

==== In-season ====
Date	Team	Former GM	Reason for leaving	New GM	Notes
September 9	Boston Red Sox	Dave Dombrowski	Fired	Brian O'Halloran	Dombrowski, who held the title President of Baseball Operations and was de facto general manager since Mike Hazen left the team in October 2016, was fired less than a year after Boston won the 2018 World Series, following a loss that dropped the team's record to 76–67 (.531).

=== Field managers ===
==== Offseason ====
Team	Former manager	Interim manager	Reason for leaving	New Manager	Notes
Cincinnati Reds	Bryan Price	Jim Riggleman	Fired	David Bell	Price was fired in April, and was replaced by Riggleman for the remainder of the 2018 season. Bell was hired for the 2019 season.
Texas Rangers	Jeff Banister	Don Wakamatsu	Fired	Chris Woodward	Banister was fired in September, and was replaced by Wakamatsu for the remainder of the season. Woodward was hired for the 2019 season.
Toronto Blue Jays	John Gibbons	None	Contract not renewed	Charlie Montoyo	On September 26, 2018, the team announced that manager John Gibbons will not be retained for the 2019 season. In his second stint with the team, Gibbons finished with a 498–494 (.502) record and two playoff appearances. On October 25, 2018, the Blue Jays announced that Charlie Montoyo will be the new manager for the 2019 season, signing him to a three-year deal with a club option for 2022.
Los Angeles Angels	Mike Scioscia	None	Resigned	Brad Ausmus	On September 30, 2018, it was announced that Mike Scioscia will be stepping down as manager of the Los Angeles Angels after 19 years with a 1650–1428 (.536) record. He led the Angels to six division titles and won the 2002 World Series. He also won the American League Manager of the Year twice during his tenure. On October 21, 2018, it was announced that Brad Ausmus would be the new manager of the Angels.
Minnesota Twins	Paul Molitor	None	Reassigned	Rocco Baldelli	On October 2, 2018, it was announced that Paul Molitor will be offered a new role in the Twins organization and will be out as manager after four years. Molitor finished with a 305–343 (.471) record with one playoff appearance in 2017, in which he was named the American League Manager of the Year after the season. On October 25, 2018, it was announced that Rocco Baldelli will be the new Twins manager.
Baltimore Orioles	Buck Showalter	None	Contract not renewed	Brandon Hyde	On October 3, 2018, the team announced that manager Buck Showalter, along with general manager Dan Duquette, will not be retained for the 2019 season. Showalter went 669–684 (.494) in his nine seasons at Baltimore and led the Orioles to the postseason three times, including the 2014 American League Championship Series, when they were swept by the Kansas City Royals, but in his final season with the Orioles, they finished with the worst record in franchise history and in the 2018 season overall at 47–115 (.290) On December 14, 2018, the Orioles officially announced that Brandon Hyde will be the new manager of the Orioles.

==== In-season ====
Team	Former manager	Interim manager	Reason for leaving	New manager	Notes
San Diego Padres	Andy Green	Rod Barajas	Fired	Jayce Tingler	On September 21, Green was fired after four seasons with a record of 274–366 (.428). Bench coach Rod Barajas was named the interim manager of the Padres for the rest of the season. The Padres would eventually hire Jayce Tingler for during the 2020 offseason.
Pittsburgh Pirates	Clint Hurdle	None	Fired	Derek Shelton	On September 28, Clint Hurdle was fired after nearly nine seasons with the Pirates, with a record of 735–720 (.505). He was fired prior to the final game of the season and did not manage the final game.

== League leaders ==
=== American League ===
Hitting leaders
Stat	Player	Total
AVG	Tim Anderson (CWS)	.335
OPS	Mike Trout (LAA)	1.083
HR	Jorge Soler (KC)	48
RBI	José Abreu (CWS)	123
R	Mookie Betts (BOS)	135
H	Whit Merrifield (KC)	206
SB	Mallex Smith (SEA)	46

Pitching leaders
Stat	Player	Total
W	Justin Verlander (HOU)	21
L	Spencer Turnbull (DET)	17
ERA	Gerrit Cole (HOU)	2.50
K	Gerrit Cole (HOU)	326
IP	Justin Verlander (HOU)	223.0
SV	Roberto Osuna (HOU)	38
WHIP	Justin Verlander (HOU)	0.803

=== National League ===
Hitting leaders
Stat	Player	Total
AVG	Christian Yelich (MIL)	.329
OPS	Christian Yelich (MIL)	1.100
HR	Pete Alonso (NYM)	53
RBI	Anthony Rendon (WSH)	126
R	Ronald Acuña Jr. (ATL)	127
H	Ozzie Albies (ATL)	189
SB	Ronald Acuña Jr. (ATL)	37

Pitching leaders
Stat	Player	Total
W	Stephen Strasburg (WSH)	18
L	Sandy Alcantara (MIA); Merrill Kelly (AZ); Miles Mikolas (STL)	14
ERA	Hyun-Jin Ryu (LAD)	2.32
K	Jacob deGrom (NYM)	255
IP	Stephen Strasburg (WSH)	209.0
SV	Kirby Yates (SD)	41
WHIP	Jack Flaherty (STL)	0.968

== Milestones ==
=== Batters ===
- Paul Goldschmidt (STL):
  - Became the first player in Major League history to hit three home runs in either his first or second game with a new team. He accomplished the feat on March 29 against the Milwaukee Brewers.
- Christian Yelich (MIL):
  - With a home run in the first inning against the St. Louis Cardinals on March 31, Yelich became the sixth player in Major League history to hit a home run in each of his team's first four games of the season.
  - With his 14th home run of the season on April 27 against the New York Mets, Yelich tied a Major League record for the most home runs in a single season before May 1. He tied the record that was set by Albert Pujols (2006) and Alex Rodriguez (2007).
- Zack Greinke (HOU)/(AZ):
  - At age 35, became the oldest pitcher since 1957 to hit multiple home runs in the same game on April 2 against the San Diego Padres.
  - Became the first pitcher since 1930 to have at least five extra-base hits through the team's first 26 games on April 25 against the Pittsburgh Pirates. He also became the first pitcher since 1906 to hit for the cycle all in the month of April.
- Chris Davis (BAL):
  - With his line drive out in the fifth inning against the Oakland Athletics on April 8, Davis set the Major League record with his 47th consecutive hitless at-bat. He broke the record that was set by Eugenio Vélez at the end of the 2010 season and the beginning of the 2011 season. Davis finally was able to put an end to the streak at 54 consecutive hitless at-bats with a single in the first inning against the Boston Red Sox on April 13.
- Cody Bellinger (LAD):
  - Set the Major League record for total bases in March/April with 88 on April 26 against the Pittsburgh Pirates. He finished March/April with 97 total bases.
  - With his 14th home run of the season on April 28 against the Pittsburgh Pirates, Bellinger tied a Major League record for the most home runs in a single season before May 1. He tied the record that was set by Albert Pujols (2006), Alex Rodriguez (2007) and this year by Christian Yelich.
  - By collecting his 37th RBI on April 29 against the San Francisco Giants, Bellinger set the Major League record with the most RBI by May 1. He broke the record that was held by Mark McGwire and Juan Gonzalez, who both set the record in 1998.
  - Became the second player under the age of 25 in National League history to hit 30 home runs before the All-Star break on July 4 against the San Diego Padres. Willie Mays accomplished this feat as well in 1954.
- Juan Soto, Víctor Robles and Carter Kieboom (WSH):
  - Became the first trio of teammates aged 21-or-younger in Major League history to hit a home run in the same game against the San Diego Padres on April 27.
- Pablo Sandoval (SF):
  - On May 6 against the Cincinnati Reds became only the second player since 1900 to post a scoreless outing, hit a home run and steal a base in the same game, joining fellow Giant Christy Mathewson, who accomplished the feat on May 23, 1905.
- Robinson Canó (NYM):
  - Recorded his 2,500th career hit against the San Diego Padres on May 7 with a double in the first inning. He became the 101st player, and sixth Dominican-born, to reach this mark.
  - Recorded his 550th career double in the eighth inning against the Chicago Cubs on June 21. He became the 31st player to reach this mark.
- Joey Gallo (TEX):
  - With his 100th career home run, Gallo became the first player in Major League history to amass 100 home runs before reaching it in singles (93) on May 8 against the Pittsburgh Pirates.
- Albert Pujols (LAA):
  - Recorded his 2,000th career RBI with a home run in the third inning against the Detroit Tigers on May 9. He becomes the third player to reach this mark, joining Hank Aaron and Alex Rodriguez.
  - Recorded his 650th career double in the third inning on July 7 against the Houston Astros. He became the eighth player to reach this mark.
  - Recorded his 650th career home run on July 28 against the Baltimore Orioles. He became the sixth player to reach this mark. With this home run, Pujols also became the first player in Major League history to hit at least 650 home runs and 650 doubles in their career.
  - With a single in the fourth inning on August 14 against the Pittsburgh Pirates, Pujols became the all-time hits leader among players born outside the United States, passing Adrián Beltré with career hit 3,167.
- Trevor Story (COL):
  - Became the fastest shortstop in Major League history to hit his 100th career home run, doing so in his 448th game on May 24 against the Baltimore Orioles.
- Austin Riley (ATL):
  - With his eighth home run of the season on June 1 against the Detroit Tigers, Riley joined Rhys Hoskins, Carlos Delgado and Trevor Story as the only players in Major League history to homer at least eight times through the first 16 games of a career. Riley also tied the mark for the most RBIs through his first 16 games, with 22 (done by Jim Greengrass and Mandy Brooks).
- Edwin Encarnación (NYY)/(SEA):
  - Recorded his 400th career home run against the Los Angeles Angels on June 9 as a member of the Seattle Mariners. He became the 56th player to reach this mark.
- Howie Kendrick / Trea Turner / Adam Eaton / Anthony Rendon (WSH):
  - Became the ninth group of players to hit four consecutive home runs in the eighth inning on June 9 against the San Diego Padres.
- Shohei Ohtani (LAA):
  - Became the first Japanese-born player in Major League history to hit for the cycle on June 13 against the Tampa Bay Rays.
- Yordan Alvarez (HOU):
  - With his home run on June 15 against the Toronto Blue Jays, Alvarez tied a Major League record by hitting at least four home runs in his first five career games. In becoming the fourth player to achieve this mark, Alvarez joined Trevor Story (six in 2016), Yasiel Puig (four in 2013) and Mike Jacobs (four in 2005).
  - By knocking in two runs against the Oakland Athletics on July 22, Alvarez became the first player in Major League history to have 35 RBIs in his first 30 career games since runs batted in became an official statistic in 1920.
- Charlie Blackmon (COL):
  - Set the Major League record for most hits in a four-game series by getting 15 hits against the San Diego Padres from June 13 to 16. He broke the record that was set by Buck Jordan of the Boston Braves in 1934 and Bill White of the St. Louis Cardinals in 1961.
- Pete Alonso (NYM):
  - With his 26th home run on June 22 against the Chicago Cubs, Alonso set the record for most homers by a National League rookie before the All-Star break. Cody Bellinger had set the mark in 2017. Hit his 30th home run on July 7 against the Philadelphia Phillies becoming the third rookie to have 30 home runs by the All-Star break. He joins Mark McGwire (1987) and Aaron Judge (2017) to reach this mark.
  - On August 18, Alonso hit his 40th home run, setting a National League rookie record previously set by Cody Bellinger in 2017.
  - Became the second rookie in Major League history to hit 50 home runs when he hit his 50th on September 20 against the Cincinnati Reds. He joins Aaron Judge who accomplished this in 2017.
  - Tied the Major League rookie record for most home runs in a season with his 52nd against the Atlanta Braves on September 27. He tied the record set by Aaron Judge in 2017.
  - Set the Major League rookie record for most home runs in a season with his 53rd, passing Judge in the process, also against the Atlanta Braves, on September 28.
- Bryce Harper (PHI):
  - Became the first player in Major League history to have two milestone hits in one at-bat on July 3 against the Atlanta Braves. His at-bat in the sixth inning included his 1000th career hit and his 200th career home run.
- Travis d'Arnaud (TB):
  - Became the first player in Major League history to homer three times in a game while catching and batting leadoff. He accomplished this against the New York Yankees on July 15.
- Bo Bichette (TOR):
  - Became the first player in Major League history to record 10 extra-base hits within his first nine career games on August 6 against the Tampa Bay Rays.
- Aristides Aquino (CIN):
  - Became the first rookie in Major league history to hit a home run in three consecutive innings on August 10 against the Chicago Cubs.
  - With his 13th home run on August 28 against the Miami Marlins, he became the first player in the modern era to reach 13 home runs in 100 career plate appearances.
  - Became the fastest player to reach 15 career home runs with his home run on September 2 against the Philadelphia Phillies. Aquino accomplished this in 122 plate appearances, breaking the record by Rhys Hoskins who did it in 135 plate appearances last season.
- Rafael Devers (BOS):
  - Went 6-for-6 with four doubles against the Cleveland Indians on August 13, becoming the first player in Major League history to record six or more hits and four or more doubles in one game.
- Ronald Acuña Jr. (ATL):
  - With his 30th stolen base on August 23 against the New York Mets, Acuña became the second-youngest player to join the game's 30–30 club. The only other player to join the 30-30 club before his 22-year-old season was Mike Trout, who accomplished this feat during his 20-year-old season in 2012.
  - With his 40th home run on September 19 against the Philadelphia Phillies, Acuña became the youngest in Major League history to hit at least 40 home runs and steal 30 bases in a season.
- Eduardo Escobar (AZ):
  - Became the fourth switch-hitter in Major League history to hit at least 30 home runs, 20 doubles and 10 triples in the same season on August 29 against the Los Angeles Dodgers.
- Mike Trout (LAA):
  - On August 31, Trout made history by becoming the youngest player (28 years, 24 days) to join the 200-homer 200-stolen base club. He achieved this feat against the Boston Red Sox with his 11th stolen base of the season, breaking the record that was previously held by Barry Bonds (28 years, 349 days).
- Ketel Marte and Eduardo Escobar (AZ):
  - Became the first switch-hitting teammates in National League history to both hit 30+ home runs on September 4 against the San Diego Padres.
- Eugenio Suarez (CIN):
  - With his 48th home run against the Chicago Cubs on September 18, Suarez set a new single-season home run record by a Venezuelan-born player. He broke the record set by Andres Galarraga in 1996.
- Nelson Cruz (MIN):
  - Recorded his 400th career home run in the fourth inning against the Kansas City Royals on September 22. He became the 57th player, and tenth Dominican-born player, to reach this mark.
- Adam Frazier (PIT):
  - Tied the Major League record for most doubles in a game by hitting four against the Chicago Cubs on July 1.

=== Pitchers ===
==== No-hitters ====
- Mike Fiers (OAK):
  - Threw his second career no-hitter, and the 13th in franchise history, by defeating the Cincinnati Reds 2–0 on May 7. Fiers struck out six and walked two, throwing 83 of his 131 pitches for strikes. Fiers becomes the 35th pitcher with multiple no-hitters in his career, including the post-season. This was also the 300th no-hitter in Major League history.
- Taylor Cole and Félix Peña (LAA):
  - Combined to throw the 11th no-hitter in franchise history by defeating the Seattle Mariners 13–0 on July 12. With every player wearing Tyler Skaggs's jersey number 45 in their first home game since his death on July 1, Cole and Pena allowed only one walk during the game in the 13th combined no-hitter in Major League history. Cole started the game and went two innings, throwing 13 of his 22 pitches for strikes. Pena went the last seven innings, walking one and striking out six. He threw 81 pitches and 52 were for strikes.
- Aaron Sanchez, Will Harris, Joe Biagini, and Chris Devenski (HOU):
  - Combined to throw the 12th no-hitter in franchise history and the 14th combined no-hitter in Major League history by defeating the Seattle Mariners 9–0 on August 3. Sanchez struck out six and walked two, throwing 55 of his 92 pitches for strikes. Harris walked one while throwing 12 pitches, of which five were strikes. Biagini struck out one and walked one while throwing 22 pitches, of which 12 were strikes. Devenski struck out one; with eight of twelve pitches were strikes.
- Justin Verlander (HOU):
  - Threw his third career no-hitter and the 13th no-hitter in franchise history in a 2–0 victory against the Toronto Blue Jays at Rogers Centre on September 1. Verlander struck out fourteen batters while allowing only one walk, throwing 79 of his 120 pitches for strikes. Verlander also became the first person in Major League history to throw multiple no-hitters at the same park. He also became the sixth player in Major League history to throw at least three no-hitters, joining Nolan Ryan, Sandy Koufax, Bob Feller, Larry Corcoran, and Cy Young.

==== Other pitching accomplishments ====
- In the opening game between the Mets and the Nationals, Jacob deGrom (NYM) had 10 strikeouts and Max Scherzer (WSH) had 12. This was the second time in Opening Day history when both starting pitchers in the same game recorded ten or more strikeouts. The only other time this happened was on April 7, 1970, when Dave McNally of the Baltimore Orioles had 13 strikeouts in a complete-game win and Sam McDowell of the Detroit Tigers struck out 11 in 6 1/3 innings.
- Merrill Kelly and Jon Duplantier (AZ):
  - Became the first teammates in Major League history to make their major league debuts in the same game, with one pitcher earning a win and the other earning a save on April 1 against the San Diego Padres.
- Jacob deGrom (NYM):
  - Tied Bob Gibson for most consecutive quality starts in Major League history at 26 games, by pitching seven scoreless innings against the Miami Marlins on April 3. This came to an end in deGrom's next start against the Minnesota Twins on April 9.
- Trevor Bauer (CIN)/(CLE):
  - Became the first pitcher in Major League history to go five-plus innings in back-to-back starts to begin a season and give up only one total hit on April 4 against the Toronto Blue Jays.
- Shane Greene (ATL)/(DET):
  - Became the fastest pitcher in Major League history to earn his seventh save by closing out a game April 7 against the Kansas City Royals. Greene accomplished this in his team's first ten games.
- Taylor Clarke (AZ):
  - Became the first pitcher since 1969 to record a save and get a hit in his Major League debut on April 20 against the Chicago Cubs.
- Adam Wainwright (STL):
  - Recorded his 150th career win with a victory against the Milwaukee Brewers on April 24. He became the 261st player to reach this mark.
- Max Scherzer (WSH):
  - Recorded his 2,500th career strikeout by fanning Manuel Margot of the San Diego Padres on April 26. He became the 35th player to reach this mark.
  - For the month of June, posted an ERA of 1.00 and struck out 68 batters in 45 innings. He became the fourth pitcher in the live ball era (since 1920) with an ERA of 1.00 or lower and 68-plus strikeouts in a month. The others were Randy Johnson, Roger Clemens and Pedro Martinez.
- CC Sabathia (NYY):
  - Recorded his 3,000th career strikeout by fanning John Ryan Murphy of the Arizona Diamondbacks on April 30. He became the 17th player, and third left-hander (joining Randy Johnson and Steve Carlton), to reach this mark.
  - Recorded his 250th career win with a victory against the Tampa Bay Rays on June 19. He became the 48th player to reach this mark.
- Stephen Strasburg (WSH):
  - With his 1,500th strikeout on May 2 against the St. Louis Cardinals, Strasburg became the fastest pitcher in Major League history to reach this mark accomplishing it in 1272 1/3 innings. Chris Sale previously held the record in 1290 innings.
- Pat Venditte (SF) and Sam Dyson (MIN)/(SF):
  - Tied a Major League record by combining to hit four batters in the sixth inning of their game against the Cincinnati Reds on May 6. They tied a record that was set by the Pittsburgh Pirates on August 19, 1893.
- Félix Hernández (SEA):
  - Recorded his 2,500th career strikeout by fanning Michael Chavis of the Boston Red Sox on May 11. He became the 36th player to reach this mark.
- Chris Sale (BOS):
  - By striking out 17 Colorado Rockies in seven innings on May 14, Sale set a Major League record by striking out 17 or more batters in a start lasting seven innings or fewer.
  - Became the second pitcher in Major League history to record two immaculate innings in the same season by accomplishing this in the eighth inning on June 5 against the Kansas City Royals. Sale also did this on May 8 against the Baltimore Orioles. He joins Lefty Grove who did this during the 1928 season.
  - With his 200th strikeout on the season against the Los Angeles Angels on August 8, Sale became the fifth pitcher in Major League history to record 200-plus strikeouts in seven consecutive seasons. He joins Walter Johnson, Tom Seaver, Roger Clemens and Max Scherzer.
  - Recorded his 2,000th career strikeout by getting Oscar Mercado in the third inning on August 13 against the Cleveland Indians. He became the 83rd pitcher to reach this mark. Sale also became the fastest pitcher in Major League history to record 2,000 strikeouts. He accomplished this feat in 1,626 innings, breaking the record of 1,711 1/3 innings set by Pedro Martinez.
- Ryan Pressly (HOU):
  - With his scoreless outing on May 16 against the Detroit Tigers, Pressly has made 38 straight scoreless appearances, tying the Major League record set by Craig Kimbrel in 2011. Pressly set the new record the very next night against the Boston Red Sox. Pressly's streak came to an end at 40 games on May 24 against the Boston Red Sox.
- Zack Greinke (HOU)/(AZ):
  - Recorded his 2,500th career strikeout by fanning Franmil Reyes of the San Diego Padres on May 21. He became the 37th player to reach this mark.
  - Recorded his 200th career win with a victory against the Oakland Athletics on August 18. He became the 115th player to reach this mark.
- Justin Verlander (HOU):
  - Became the first pitcher since 1908 to strikeout 15 batters and allow at least three homers in a game on June 12 against the Milwaukee Brewers.
  - Recorded his 3,000th career strikeout by fanning Kole Calhoun of the Los Angeles Angels for his sixth strikeout of the game in the bottom of the fourth inning on September 28, during his final start of the regular season. He became the 18th player in history to reach this mark. Verlander would go on to finish the game with 12 strikeouts, with his final one, against Calhoun in the sixth inning, making him the 19th pitcher in Major League history to record at least 300 strikeouts in a single season. Verlander also became only the second pitcher in Major League history to reach 3,000 career strikeouts and 300 strikeouts in a season in the same game, joining Randy Johnson who accomplished the same feat on September 10, 2000.
- Cole Hamels (CHC):
  - Recorded his 2,500th career strikeout by fanning Iván Nova of the Chicago White Sox on June 18. He became the 38th player to reach this mark.
- Greg Holland (AZ):
  - Recorded his 200th career save by closing out a victory against the Los Angeles Dodgers on June 24. He became the 51st player to reach this mark.
- David Price (BOS):
  - Recorded his 150th career win with a victory against the Detroit Tigers on July 7. He became the 262nd player to reach this mark.
- Gerrit Cole (HOU):
  - With his 200th strikeout of the season on July 22 against the Oakland Athletics, Cole became the second fastest to this mark in Major League history. Cole reached this mark in 133 1/3 innings. Randy Johnson holds the record by reaching this mark in 130 2/3 innings during the 2001 season.
  - Became the second pitcher in Major League history to strike out 14 or more batters in three consecutive games on September 8 against the Seattle Mariners. This was first accomplished in 1999 by Pedro Martinez.
  - Became the 18th pitcher in Major League history to notch 300 strikeouts in a season when he struck out Shin-Soo Choo of the Texas Rangers in the sixth inning on September 18.
- Stevie Wilkerson (BAL):
  - Became the first position player in Major League history to earn a save (since it became official in 1969) by closing out the win on July 25 against the Los Angeles Angels. Wilkerson threw a perfect 16th inning to close out the win.
- Yu Darvish (CHC):
  - Became the first pitcher since at least 1893 to have five consecutive starts with at least eight strikeouts and no walks. The streak ended on August 27 when Darvish had seven strikeouts and one walk in the Cubs' 5–2 win over the New York Mets.
- Brian Moran (MIA):
  - Became the first pitcher in Major League history to strike out his brother in his Major League debut when he struck out Pirates third baseman Colin Moran on September 5.
- Roberto Osuna (HOU):
  - Became the youngest player in Major League history to reach 150 career saves by closing out a victory on September 17 against the Texas Rangers. Osuna is 24 years old, breaking the mark set by Craig Kimbrel, who was 25 when he set the mark.
- Kenley Jansen (LAD):
  - Recorded his 300th career save by closing out a victory against the San Diego Padres on September 25. He became the 30th player to reach this mark.
- Gerrit Cole and Justin Verlander (HOU):
  - Became only the second pair of teammates to each record 300 or more strikeouts during the same season, joining Curt Schilling and Randy Johnson who accomplished the feat with the Arizona Diamondbacks during the 2002 season.

=== Miscellaneous ===
- Major League Baseball:
  - In May, there were 1,135 home runs hit, which set a new Major League record for the most home runs in a month. The previous record was from August 2017, when there were 1,119 home runs hit. The record was broken again in June, with 1,142 home runs hit. The record was broken yet again in August, with 1,228 home runs hit.
  - A new Major League record for the most home runs in a season was set on September 11, when Jonathan Villar of the Baltimore Orioles hit a go-ahead three-run home run in the bottom of the seventh inning against the Los Angeles Dodgers. The home run was the 6,106th home run league-wide of the season, breaking the previous record of 6,105 home runs that was set two years earlier during the 2017 season. Major League Baseball finished with a total of 6,776 home runs.
  - For the 12th straight season, Major League Baseball set a new record for most strikeouts in a single season.
  - For the first time in Major League Baseball history, at least four teams (the Houston Astros, Los Angeles Dodgers, New York Yankees and Minnesota Twins) recorded 100 or more wins in the same season.
  - The World Series was the first best-of-seven postseason series in the history of the major North American sports where all seven games were won by the road team.
- Los Angeles Dodgers:
  - On March 28, the Dodgers set a Major League record for most home runs (eight) on Opening Day, in their 12–5 win against the Arizona Diamondbacks. The Dodgers tied the Major League record for most home runs in a team's first six games with 17.
  - On April 17, the Dodgers tied a Major League record by hitting a home run in 32 straight home games against the Cincinnati Reds. A.J. Pollock hit the record tying home run in the sixth inning. The streak started, and only includes the regular season, on August 21, 2018. This tied the record that was previously held by the 1999 Colorado Rockies. The Dodgers set the new record their next home game on April 26 against the Pittsburgh Pirates on Cody Bellinger's home run in the first inning. The streak came to an end, at 33 consecutive games, the very next game against the Pirates.
  - Became the first team in Major League history to win two consecutive games on a walk-off home run by a rookie on June 22 against the Colorado Rockies. The following day, they would go on to win the game on another rookie walk-off homer to make it three in a row.
  - Became the first team in the live ball era (since 1920) to end a game on five consecutive walks on July 2 in a 5–4 win against the Arizona Diamondbacks.
  - Set the Major League record for most home runs in a five-game stretch with 22 home runs from August 11–16 (off on August 12).
  - Set the National League record for most home runs in a single season with 279 home runs. That's 30 more than the 2000 Houston Astros.
- Elvis Luciano (TOR):
  - Is the first player in Major League history born in the 2000s. He made his debut on March 31 against the Detroit Tigers. He won his first game on April 28 against the Oakland Athletics.
- Seattle Mariners:
  - Set a Major League record for hitting a home run in a record 15 straight games to open the season, breaking the mark set by the 2002 Cleveland Indians. Dee Gordon hit the home run in the sixth inning against the Kansas City Royals on April 11. The Mariners were able to extend the record to 20 straight games but were unable to hit a home run in a loss to the Cleveland Indians on April 17.
- Edwin Jackson (TOR):
  - Set a Major League record for appearing in a game for his 14th Major League team with his first pitch to Giants' Joe Panik on May 15. He broke the record that he shared with Octavio Dotel.
- San Diego Padres:
  - The Padres broke the record for the longest no-hitter drought with 8,020 games on May 16 against the Pittsburgh Pirates. The drought started with the team's inaugural game on April 8, 1969. They broke the record that was set by the New York Mets, that ended with Johan Santana's no-hitter in 2012.
- Houston Astros:
  - With their win against the Boston Red Sox on May 18, the Astros became the third team in Major League history to have two winning streaks of at least 10 games before June 1 of a season, following the 1941 St. Louis Cardinals and 1955 Brooklyn Dodgers.
  - Became the first team in Major League All-Star history that three players from the same club got the first three hits for one team. This was accomplished by George Springer, Alex Bregman and Michael Brantley.
  - Became the first team in Major League history to hit six home runs in the first two innings of a game on September 9 against the Oakland Athletics.
  - Became the first team in Major League history to lead the majors in pitching strikeouts (1,671) and the fewest hitting strikeouts (1,166).
- Toronto Blue Jays:
  - Upon the former making his Major League debut on May 24, Cavan Biggio (son of Craig Biggio) and fellow rookie Vladimir Guerrero Jr. became the first teammates in Major League history whose fathers were both members of the Baseball Hall of Fame.
- Minnesota Twins:
  - Became the first team in Major League history to have five games with at least five home runs before the start of June after their game against the Seattle Mariners on May 18.
  - With their second eight-home-run day of the season on May 23 against the Los Angeles Angels, the Twins had hit 98 home runs in their first 49 games, matching the most hit by a team through its first 49 games in Major League history. They tied the record set by the 1999 Seattle Mariners and the 2000 St. Louis Cardinals.
  - On July 5, set the Major League record for most home runs before the All-Star break with 165 beating the record of 161 set last season by the New York Yankees. The Twins finished with 166 home runs at the All-Star break.
  - Became the first team in Major League history with nine 5-plus-home-run games in single season on July 25 against the Chicago White Sox. The following night, the Twins became the fastest team in Major League history to reach their 200th home run, doing so in 103 games, 19 games less than the 2005 Texas Rangers.
  - Set the Major League record for most road home runs in a season by hitting their 141st home run against the Chicago White Sox on August 29. They broke the record that was set in 2001 by the San Francisco Giants.
  - Set the Major League record for most home runs in a season by hitting their 268th home run against the Detroit Tigers on August 31. They broke the record set last season by the New York Yankees. The Twins finished the season with 307 home runs, which set a new Major League record.
  - With Jorge Polanco's 20th home run on August 31 against the Detroit Tigers, the Twins set the Major League record for most players with at least 20 home runs during the season. Polanco became the eighth Twin to reach this plateau, breaking the mark that was set held by seven teams, most recently by the 2018 Los Angeles Dodgers.
  - Became the first team in Major League history to have five players (Nelson Cruz, Max Kepler, Eddie Rosario, Mitch Garver and Miguel Sano) to hit at least 30 home runs in a season.
  - With Jonathan Schoop's home run on September 26 against the Detroit Tigers, the Twins became the first team in Major League history to hit 300 home runs in a season.
- Baltimore Orioles:
  - Gave up their 100th home run of the season on May 21 against the New York Yankees. The Orioles pitching staff did it in 48 games, which was nine games faster than the previous fastest held by the 2000 Kansas City Royals.
  - Became the first team in Major League history to score at least 13 runs each in consecutive shutout games. Both games were against the Cleveland Indians on June 28 and 29.
  - Became the first team in Major League history to homer at least twice in 10 consecutive games on July 27 against the Los Angeles Angels.
  - Became the first team in Major League history to allow multiple home runs in 10 consecutive games on August 5 against the New York Yankees.
  - Set the record for most home runs allowed in a season by giving up their 259th on August 22 against the Tampa Bay Rays. Austin Meadows hit the home run in the third inning, breaking the mark that was set by the Cincinnati Reds during the 2016 season. The Orioles gave up 305 home runs to establish the new record.
- New York Yankees:
  - On May 22 became the first team in Major League history to hit at least three home runs in six consecutive games in the same ballpark (Oriole Park at Camden Yards).
  - Set the Major League record for most consecutive games (28) with a home run on June 25 against the Toronto Blue Jays. They broke the record that was set in 2002 by the Texas Rangers. The streak came to an end at 31 games after not hitting a home run against the New York Mets on July 2.
  - In their season series against the Baltimore Orioles, the Yankees hit 61 home runs, a new Major League record.
  - Set the Major League record for most home runs in any month with their 59th home run against the Los Angeles Dodgers on August 26. This broke the record that was held by the Baltimore Orioles (May 1987) and the Seattle Mariners (May 1999). They finished August with 74 home runs.
- Washington Nationals:
  - Became the first franchise in Major League history to hit back-to-back-to-back-to-back home runs on more than one occasion on June 9 against the San Diego Padres. They also accomplished this feat on July 17, 2017, against the Milwaukee Brewers. This was the ninth time in Major League history that four consecutive home runs were hit.
- Arizona Diamondbacks:
  - Became the second team in Major League history to hit three straight home runs to start a game on the road on June 10 against the Philadelphia Phillies. The first team to accomplish this was the Milwaukee Brewers on September 9, 2007.
    - Three Major League firsts were also accomplished in this game:
      - The Diamondbacks became the first team in Major League history to hit eight home runs in a game and surrender eight home runs in another game (March 28 against the Los Angeles Dodgers) in the same season.
      - Back-to-back-to-back home runs by a team on three consecutive days. The Los Angeles Angels on June 8, the Washington Nationals on June 9 and the Diamondbacks on June 10.
      - Thirteen combined home runs in a single game.
  - Became the first team in the modern era (since 1900) to win a game that lasted nine or more innings while having just one baserunner, according to Elias Sports. This was accomplished on September 14 against the Cincinnati Reds.
- The San Diego Padres and Colorado Rockies scored 92 runs during their four-game series from June 13 to 16 to set a Major League record. They broke the record of 88 runs that was set in May 1929 by the Philadelphia Phillies and Brooklyn Robins.
- Cincinnati Reds:
  - Against the Colorado Rockies on July 13, the Reds, according to Elias Sports, became the first Major League team in the modern era to collect five triples and at least three home runs in one game.
- The game between the San Francisco Giants and Arizona Diamondbacks on August 16 was the first in National League history that each team hit at least six home runs.
- Michael Lorenzen (CIN):
  - Became the first player since Babe Ruth on June 13, 1921, to earn the win, hit a home run and play in the field in the same game on September 4 against the Philadelphia Phillies.
- Bruce Bochy (SF):
  - Became the 11th manager in Major League history to record 2,000 career victories during the Giants' 11–3 victory against the Boston Red Sox on September 18.

== Awards and honors ==
=== Regular season ===
Baseball Writers' Association of America Awards
BBWAA Award	National League	American League
Rookie of the Year	Pete Alonso (NYM)	Yordan Alvarez (HOU)
Cy Young Award	Jacob deGrom (NYM)	Justin Verlander (HOU)
Manager of the Year	Mike Shildt (STL)	Rocco Baldelli (MIN)
Most Valuable Player	Cody Bellinger (LAD)	Mike Trout (LAA)
Gold Glove Awards
Position	National League	American League
Pitcher	Zack Greinke (AZ)	Mike Leake (SEA)
Catcher	J. T. Realmuto (PHI)	Roberto Pérez (CLE)
1st Base	Anthony Rizzo (CHC)	Matt Olson (OAK)
2nd Base	Kolten Wong (STL)	Yolmer Sánchez (CWS)
3rd Base	Nolan Arenado (COL)	Matt Chapman (OAK)
Shortstop	Nick Ahmed (AZ)	Francisco Lindor (CLE)
Left field	David Peralta (AZ)	Alex Gordon (KC)
Center field	Lorenzo Cain (MIL)	Kevin Kiermaier (TB)
Right field	Cody Bellinger (LAD)	Mookie Betts (BOS)
Silver Slugger Awards
Pitcher/Designated Hitter	Zack Greinke (AZ)	Nelson Cruz (MIN)
Catcher	J. T. Realmuto (PHI)	Mitch Garver (MIN)
1st Base	Freddie Freeman (ATL)	Carlos Santana (CLE)
2nd Base	Ozzie Albies (ATL)	DJ LeMahieu (NYY)
3rd Base	Anthony Rendon (WSH)	Alex Bregman (HOU)
Shortstop	Trevor Story (COL)	Xander Bogaerts (BOS)
Outfield	Ronald Acuña Jr. (ATL)	Mookie Betts (BOS)
Outfield	Cody Bellinger (LAD)	George Springer (HOU)
Outfield	Christian Yelich (MIL)	Mike Trout (LAA)

=== All-MLB Team ===
On December 10, Major League Baseball announced its first-ever All-MLB team. Players were selected through fan votes (50%) and votes from a panel of experts (50%). The winners were selected based on merit, with no set number of nominees per position and no distinction between leagues.

All-MLB First Team
Position	Player (Team)
Starting pitcher	Gerrit Cole (HOU)
Starting pitcher	Justin Verlander (HOU)
Starting pitcher	Jacob deGrom (NYM)
Starting pitcher	Max Scherzer (WSH)
Starting pitcher	Stephen Strasburg (WSH)
Relief pitcher	Kirby Yates (SD)
Relief pitcher	Josh Hader (MIL)
Designated hitter	Nelson Cruz (MIN)
Catcher	J. T. Realmuto (PHI)
1st Base	Pete Alonso (NYM)
2nd Base	DJ LeMahieu (NYY)
3rd Base	Anthony Rendon (WSH)
Shortstop	Xander Bogaerts (BOS)
Outfield	Mike Trout (LAA)
Outfield	Cody Bellinger (LAD)
Outfield	Christian Yelich (MIL)
All-MLB Second Team
Starting pitcher	Zack Greinke (HOU)/(AZ)
Starting pitcher	Hyun-jin Ryu (LAD)
Starting pitcher	Jack Flaherty (STL)
Starting pitcher	Charlie Morton (TB)
Starting pitcher	Mike Soroka (ATL)
Relief pitcher	Aroldis Chapman (NYY)
Relief pitcher	Liam Hendriks (OAK)
Designated hitter	Yordan Alvarez (HOU)
Catcher	Yasmani Grandal (MIL)
1st Base	Freddie Freeman (ATL)
2nd Base	Jose Altuve (HOU)
3rd Base	Alex Bregman (HOU)
Shortstop	Marcus Semien (OAK)
Outfield	Ronald Acuña Jr. (ATL)
Outfield	Juan Soto (WSH)
Outfield	Mookie Betts (BOS)

=== Other awards ===
- The Sporting News Player of the Year Award: Mike Trout (LAA)
- Comeback Players of the Year: Carlos Carrasco (CLE, American); Josh Donaldson (ATL, National)
- Edgar Martínez Award (Best designated hitter): Nelson Cruz (MIN)
- Hank Aaron Award: Mike Trout (LAA, American); Christian Yelich (MIL, National)
- Roberto Clemente Award (Humanitarian): Carlos Carrasco (CLE)
- Mariano Rivera AL Reliever of the Year Award (Best AL reliever): Aroldis Chapman (NYY)
- Trevor Hoffman NL Reliever of the Year Award (Best NL reliever): Josh Hader (MIL)
- Warren Spahn Award (Best left-handed pitcher): Patrick Corbin (WSH)

Fielding Bible Awards
Position	Player
Pitcher	Zack Greinke
Catcher	Roberto Perez
1st Base	Matt Olson
2nd Base	Kolten Wong
3rd Base	Matt Chapman
Shortstop	Nick Ahmed
Left Field	David Peralta
Center Field	Lorenzo Cain
Right Field	Cody Bellinger
Multi-position	Cody Bellinger

=== Monthly awards ===
==== Player of the Month ====
Month	American League	National League
April	Tim Anderson	Cody Bellinger
May	Rafael Devers	Josh Bell
June	DJ LeMahieu	Charlie Blackmon
July	Yuli Gurriel	Paul Goldschmidt
August	Alex Bregman	Aristides Aquino
September	Austin Meadows	Eugenio Suárez

==== Pitcher of the Month ====
Month	American League	National League
April	Tyler Glasnow	Luis Castillo
May	Lucas Giolito	Hyun-jin Ryu
June	Gerrit Cole	Max Scherzer
July	Gerrit Cole	Stephen Strasburg
August	Mike Clevinger	Jack Flaherty
September	Gerrit Cole	Jack Flaherty

==== Rookie of the Month ====
Month	American League	National League
April	Brandon Lowe	Pete Alonso
May	Michael Chavis	Austin Riley
June	Yordan Alvarez	Pete Alonso
July	Yordan Alvarez	Keston Hiura
August	Yordan Alvarez	Aristides Aquino
September	Eloy Jiménez	Pete Alonso

==== Reliever of the Month ====
Month	American League	National League
April	Shane Greene	Kirby Yates
May	Aroldis Chapman	Josh Hader
June	Liam Hendriks	Josh Hader
July	Tommy Kahnle	Seth Lugo
August	Aroldis Chapman	Felipe Vázquez
September	Brandon Workman	Brent Suter

== Home field attendance and payroll ==
Team name	Wins	%±	Home attendance	%±	Per game	Est. payroll	%±
Los Angeles Dodgers	106	15.2%	3,974,309	3.0%	49,066	$193,553,333	17.5%
St. Louis Cardinals	91	3.4%	3,480,393	2.3%	42,968	$161,120,267	2.2%
New York Yankees	103	3.0%	3,304,404	−5.1%	40,795	$228,442,421	42.1%
Chicago Cubs	84	−11.6%	3,094,865	−2.7%	38,208	$217,805,215	6.1%
Los Angeles Angels	72	−10.0%	3,023,012	0.1%	37,321	$177,345,250	6.3%
Colorado Rockies	71	−22.0%	2,993,244	−0.8%	36,954	$145,348,500	6.4%
Milwaukee Brewers	89	−7.3%	2,923,333	2.5%	36,091	$128,842,900	17.9%
Boston Red Sox	84	−22.2%	2,915,502	0.7%	35,994	$218,978,142	−1.5%
Houston Astros	107	3.9%	2,857,367	−4.1%	35,276	$166,042,500	−3.9%
Philadelphia Phillies	81	1.3%	2,727,421	26.4%	33,672	$141,786,962	51.0%
San Francisco Giants	77	5.5%	2,707,760	−14.2%	33,429	$175,550,753	−13.1%
Atlanta Braves	97	7.8%	2,654,920	3.9%	32,777	$133,186,667	15.0%
New York Mets	86	11.7%	2,442,532	9.8%	30,155	$154,837,230	−4.1%
San Diego Padres	70	6.1%	2,396,399	10.5%	29,585	$90,260,767	−3.8%
Minnesota Twins	101	29.5%	2,303,299	17.6%	28,436	$113,758,333	3.2%
Washington Nationals	93	13.4%	2,259,781	−10.7%	27,899	$203,016,595	7.5%
Arizona Diamondbacks	85	3.7%	2,135,510	−4.8%	26,364	$124,016,266	−8.0%
Texas Rangers	78	16.4%	2,132,994	1.2%	26,333	$104,433,499	−1.6%
Cincinnati Reds	75	11.9%	1,809,075	11.0%	22,334	$109,737,499	16.0%
Seattle Mariners	68	−23.6%	1,791,109	−22.1%	22,112	$126,874,600	−19.2%
Toronto Blue Jays	67	−8.2%	1,750,144	−24.7%	21,607	$64,680,671	−57.4%
Cleveland Indians	93	2.2%	1,738,642	−9.8%	21,465	$151,257,783	5.5%
Oakland Athletics	97	0.0%	1,670,734	6.2%	20,626	$102,935,833	47.3%
Chicago White Sox	72	16.1%	1,649,775	2.5%	20,622	$80,846,333	7.7%
Detroit Tigers	47	−26.6%	1,501,430	−19.1%	18,536	$100,618,500	−9.8%
Pittsburgh Pirates	69	−15.9%	1,491,439	1.8%	18,413	$72,915,501	−17.3%
Kansas City Royals	59	1.7%	1,479,659	−11.1%	18,267	$98,183,242	3.1%
Baltimore Orioles	54	14.9%	1,307,807	−16.4%	16,146	$82,696,100	−41.6%
Tampa Bay Rays	96	6.7%	1,178,735	2.1%	14,552	$56,071,767	21.9%
Miami Marlins	57	−9.5%	811,302	0.0%	10,016	$74,683,643	−13.7%

== Uniforms ==
=== Changes ===
On November 16, 2018, the Miami Marlins unveiled a new logo, team colors, and uniform for 2019, as part of changes instituted by the team's new CEO Derek Jeter. The new design replaces one used since their 2012 move to Marlins Park and rebranding from the Florida Marlins to the Miami Marlins, and utilizes shades of red, blue, black, and slate.

On January 29, 2018, Major League Baseball stated that the Cleveland Indians had agreed to stop using their "Chief Wahoo" logo—which has attracted controversy as a stereotype of Native Americans—on their uniforms in 2019, as it was deemed to be "no longer appropriate for on-field use". The block C cap insignia will officially become the team's main logo; on November 19, 2018, the team unveiled new uniforms excluding the Chief Wahoo logo, as well as new hats with red brims for home games, a new red-colored home alternate jersey (marking the team's first red jersey since the 1970s), and sleeve patches commemorating their hosting of the 2019 All-Star Game. In order to maintain trademarks and prevent it from falling into the public domain, the logo will continue to be used on a limited amount of team merchandise.

All 30 teams wore patches this year on the right sleeve commemorating MLB's 150th anniversary. The patch was also featured on caps on Opening Day.

=== Anniversaries and special events ===
The following teams will wear commemorative patches for special occasions

Team	Special occasion
All Teams	150th anniversary of Major League Baseball
All Teams	#42 patch for Jackie Robinson Day (April 15)
All Teams	Pink ribbons for breast cancer awareness (May 12, Mother's Day)
All Teams	"Play Ball" patch in partnership with USA Baseball and USA Softball (June 1–2)
All Teams	Blue ribbons for prostate cancer awareness (June 16, Father's Day)
All Teams	No July 4 uniforms this season but special Stars and Stripes fauxback caps July 4–7
All Teams	Gold ribbons for childhood cancer (August 30)
Baltimore Orioles	#20 patch in memory of Frank Robinson
Boston Red Sox	2018 World Series Championship (April 9)
Boston Red Sox	2019 MLB London Series (June 29–30)
Cincinnati Reds	150th anniversary of professional baseball
Cincinnati Reds	#20 patch in memory of Frank Robinson
Cleveland Indians	2019 All-Star Game
Cleveland Indians	#20 patch in memory of Frank Robinson (April 1)
Los Angeles Angels	#45 patch in memory of Tyler Skaggs (From July 2 onwards)
Los Angeles Dodgers	#36 patch in memory of Don Newcombe
Milwaukee Brewers	50th Anniversary of the franchise (as the Seattle Pilots)
New York Yankees	Black armband on left sleeve in memory of Mel Stottlemyre
New York Yankees	2019 MLB London Series (June 29–30)
Philadelphia Phillies	"DPM" patch in memory of team chairman David Montgomery (From May 13 onwards)
Philadelphia Phillies	Patch to commemorate Ryan Howard's retirement (July 14)
Pittsburgh Pirates	Department of Public Safety patches (April 20)
Pittsburgh Pirates	40th Anniversary of 1979 World Series Championship
San Diego Padres	50th Anniversary in San Diego
San Francisco Giants	"PETER" patch in memory of former team president Peter Magowan
San Francisco Giants	"STRETCH 44" patch in memory of Willie McCovey
Seattle Mariners	Edgar Martínez Hall of Fame Patch (August 9–11)
Tampa Bay Rays	"VJN" patch in memory of founder and first owner Vince Naimoli (From August 30 onwards)
Texas Rangers	Final Season at Globe Life Park in Arlington
Toronto Blue Jays	Canadian flag patch for Canada Day (July 1)

=== Other uniforms ===
- April 15: Players, managers and umpires wore #42, the 72nd anniversary of Jackie Robinson's debut in the majors.
- May 27: All teams wore a uniform with a poppy which had the words "Lest We Forget" for Memorial Day.
- June 29: The Orioles wore uniforms based on the Maryland state flag.
- July 12: The Angels wore uniforms with the name "Skaggs" and the number 45 to remember Tyler Skaggs, who had died on July 1.
- July 13: The Giants and Brewers wore Spanish language "Gigantes" and "Cerveceros" uniforms.
- July 22: The Astros wore caps with the Apollo 11 logo to mark the 50th anniversary of the Moon landing.
- August 18: The Cubs and Pirates wore special caps and uniforms at the Little League World Series. The Cubs wore uniforms with the word "Cubbies" and the Pirates wore uniforms with the words "The Burgh". Players wore nicknames on their backs.
- August 23 to 25: For the third straight year, there was a Players Weekend, an event for which all teams allowed players to showcase their passions, backgrounds and interests by putting their personal touches, including nicknames, on what they wear and the equipment they use. The teams wore either black or white uniforms with the home team choosing what color they wanted to wear during the weekend. The pitcher always wore a black hat, no matter what uniform color the team wore.
- September 6: The Reds and Braves wore Spanish language "Los Rojos" and "Los Bravos" uniforms.
- September 8 and 16: The Athletics wore Spanish language "Atléticos" uniforms.
- September 14: The Giants wore black uniforms with orange "Gigantes" uniforms.

== Throwbacks ==
To honor the 150th anniversary of the Cincinnati Red Stockings becoming the first professional baseball team, the Cincinnati Reds announced on November 5, 2018, that the team would wear fifteen throwback uniforms. They wore:

- May 4 – 1902 throwbacks (the 150th anniversary of the Red Stockings' 1869 home opener)
- May 5 – 1911 road throwbacks
- May 19 – 1919 throwbacks
- July 6 – 1939 throwbacks
- July 7 – 1956 road throwbacks
- July 21 – 1961 throwbacks
- July 28 – 1967 throwbacks
- August 11 – 1969 throwbacks
- September 22 – 1999 throwbacks

The Pirates are continuing to wear 1979 "bumblebee" throwbacks on Sundays this season. The team wore mono-black uniforms July 20 as the 40th anniversary of the 1979 World Series-winning team was honored.

The Pirates and Brewers wore Negro leagues throwbacks June 1 and 7. The Pirates wore uniforms of the Pittsburgh Crawfords and the Brewers wore the uniforms of the Milwaukee Bears.

The Twins and Royals wore Negro leagues throwbacks June 23. The Twins wore 1908 uniforms of the St. Paul Colored Gophers, and the Royals wore 1942 uniforms of the Kansas City Monarchs.

The Mariners and Astros wore 1980s–1990s throwbacks June 29.

The Royals and Nationals wore 1969 throwbacks July 6. The Nationals wore the 1969 throwbacks of the Montreal Expos.

The Phillies wore mono-burgundy 1979 "Saturday Night Special" throwbacks July 27. They were only worn once, on May 27, 1979. The Braves wore 1979 throwbacks, as well.

The Braves wore 1970's throwbacks August 1 to 4.

The Mariners and Astros wore 1980s throwbacks August 2.

The Orioles and Astros wore 1989 throwbacks August 9.

The Angels wore 1970s California Angels throwbacks August 16.

== Venues ==
This was the Texas Rangers' final season at Globe Life Park in Arlington (formerly known as the Ballpark in Arlington and Ameriquest Field), where the team played its final regular season home game with a 6–1 win over the New York Yankees on September 29 before moving to Globe Life Field in 2020.

The stadium of the Seattle Mariners was renamed T-Mobile Park for the mobile provider (including its magenta-pink logo color as part of the park's branding atmosphere), after Safeco's contract with the team to call the venue Safeco Field expired at the end of the 2018 season.

The home field of the San Francisco Giants had its fourth name in its history since opening in 2000, but its first name outside the same company, as Oracle will pay an unknown but significant amount for a twenty-year agreement to rename the former AT&T Park as Oracle Park. It also keeps Oracle's name on a Bay Area sports venue, as the Golden State Warriors left Oakland's Oracle Arena for the Chase Center .75 miles (1.2 km) south of Oracle Park at the end of the 2018–19 NBA season.

== Broadcast rights ==
=== Television ===
==== National ====
This was the sixth year of the current eight-year deals with Fox Sports, ESPN, and TBS. Fox aired eight weeks of baseball on Saturday Nights which led up to the 2019 Major League Baseball All-Star Game which also aired on Fox. Fox then televised Saturday afternoon games for the final four weeks of the season. FS1 televised games on Tuesday and on Saturday both during the afternoon and night. ESPN televised games on its flagship telecast Sunday Night Baseball as well as Monday and Wednesday nights. TBS televised Sunday afternoon games for the last 13 weeks of the regular season. Fox and ESPN Sunday Night Baseball telecasts were exclusive; all other national telecasts were subject to local blackout.

TBS televised the National League Wild Card Game, Division Series, and the Championship Series. ESPN televised the American League Wild Card. FS1 and MLB Network televised the American League Division Series. Fox and FS1 televised the American League Championship Series. The World Series will air exclusively on Fox for the 20th consecutive year.

On April 30, 2019, Major League Baseball and YouTube agreed to a partnership for 13 exclusive baseball games. The agreement was essentially a replacement to an earlier deal with Facebook Watch, which was criticized for requiring a Facebook account to access and for having too clunky of an interface. The YouTube games would feature a pre and post game show, alongside the game, all produced by MLB Network. There was no requirement for a YouTube account to access the game. The first game aired was between the Phillies and the Dodgers on July 18, 2019. After the season, MLB said they averaged 130,000 viewers per telecast. The August 7, Dodgers-Cardinals telecast saw the highest peak of 320,000 live viewers.

==== Local ====
Under an agreement with the U.S. Department of Justice regarding Disney's acquisition of 21st Century Fox, the Fox Sports Regional Networks were required to be sold off to third parties by June 18, 2019. Fox also invoked a clause to give Yankee Global Enterprises the rights to buy their stake back in the YES Network. Including YES, the Fox Sports Regional Networks broadcast games for 15 of the 30 MLB teams. On March 8, YES was sold to a consortium including Yankee Global Enterprises, Amazon, and Sinclair Broadcast Group for $3.5 billion. Then on May 3, Sinclair and Entertainment Studios agreed to purchase the rest of the Fox Sports Regional Networks. The networks continued to use the Fox Sports branding for the rest of the regular season under a transitional license agreement.

WGN-TV broadcasts of Chicago Cubs and White Sox games concluded at the end of the season. WGN held the local broadcast television rights of both teams since 1948. The network's final telecasts took place on September 28 (Cubs) and September 29 (White Sox). Effective with the 2020 season, Cubs games will move exclusively to the new Marquee Sports Network, while White Sox games will air full-time on NBC Sports Chicago.

=== Radio ===
==== Local ====
- The New York Mets moved from iHeartMedia's WOR (710) to Entercom's WCBS (880), returning the team to the fold of the former CBS Radio New York cluster after five years with WOR (the team previously had a decades-long association with WFAN). However, the team's radio network throughout New York State was dissolved before the season, leaving WCBS the only station broadcasting the team's games.

==== National ====
- ESPN Radio will air its 22nd season of national coverage, including Sunday Night Baseball, Saturday games, Opening Day and holiday games, the All-Star Game, and Home Run Derby, and the entire Major League Baseball postseason.

=== Digital ===
MLB's contract with Facebook Watch has been further downsized, now only consisting of six games (reduced from 25). In addition, the games will no longer be exclusive to the service, and subject to blackout in-market. The league also reached a new digital partnership with the streaming service DAZN, who now airs a daily studio program, ChangeUp, which features live look-ins on games in progress.

In mid-July, MLB and Google announced that 13 games will air exclusively on YouTube, produced by MLB Network.

== Retirements ==
The following players and managers retired from the start of 2019 season through Opening Day of the 2020 season:

- Bruce Bochy – February 18 that he will retire from managing the San Francisco Giants at the end of the season
- Ichiro Suzuki – March 21
- Jason Hammel – March 23
- Craig Gentry – May 2
- Jake Peavy – May 5, but had not pitched professionally since 2016
- James Loney – May 10
- Koji Uehara – May 19, but had not pitched in the majors since 2017
- Sean Burnett – May 28
- Matt den Dekker – June 7
- Alex Meyer – June 25
- Cody Decker – July 7
- Chris Stewart – July 12
- Kirk Nieuwenhuis – July 12
- Troy Tulowitzki – July 25
- Danny Farquhar – July 31
- Ty Kelly – August 24
- Ned Yost – September 23 that he will retire from managing the Kansas City Royals at the end of the season
- Brian McCann – October 9
- David Freese – October 12
- CC Sabathia – October 21
- Tanner Scheppers – October 24
- Mike Olt – October 25
- Michael Saunders – October 25, but had not played professionally since 2017
- Kristopher Negrón – November 12
- Clint Hurdle – November 13 that he is retiring from managing
- Koda Glover – December 2
- Ian Kinsler – December 20
- Carlos Gomez – January 16, 2020
- Tony Barnette – January 28, 2020
- Peter Bourjos – January 30, 2020
- Curtis Granderson – January 31, 2020
- Mike Dunn – February 4, 2020
- Kendrys Morales – February 7, 2020
- Martín Prado – February 12, 2020
- Jeremy Hellickson – February 14, 2020
- Lonnie Chisenhall – February 21, 2020
- Tom Koehler – March 2, 2020
- A. J. Reed – March 4, 2020
- Evan Gattis – March 30, 2020
- Mark Reynolds – April 9, 2020
- Steve Pearce – April 14, 2020
- Rob Wooten – April 18, 2020
- Ryan O'Rourke – June 8, 2020
- Denard Span – June 8, 2020
- Chad Bettis – June 25, 2020
- Blake Trahan – June 28, 2020
- Brandon Guyer – July 6, 2020
- Devin Mesoraco – July 10, 2020
- George Kontos – July 20, 2020

== Retired numbers ==
- Adrián Beltré had his #29 retired by the Texas Rangers on June 8. It was the fifth number retired by the franchise.
- Joe Mauer had his #7 retired by the Minnesota Twins on June 15. It was the ninth number retired by the franchise.
- Michael Young had his #10 retired by the Texas Rangers on August 31. It was the sixth number retired by the franchise.

== See also ==
- 2019 in baseball
- 2019 KBO League season
- 2019 Nippon Professional Baseball season
- MLB in Omaha
