= MLB in Omaha =

Special Major League Baseball event

	1	2	3	4	5	6	7	8	9	R	H	E
Detroit Tigers	0	0	0	0	0	0	1	1	1	3	7	1
Kansas City Royals	0	2	0	3	1	1	0	0	×	7	10	1
- Date: June 13, 2019
- Venue: Charles Schwab Field Omaha (Note: Formerly TD Ameritrade Park Omaha)
- City: Omaha, Nebraska
- Managers: Ron Gardenhire (Detroit Tigers); Ned Yost (Kansas City Royals)
- Umpires: HP: Alan Porter; 1B: Joe West (Note: Crew Chief); 2B: John Libka; 3B: Eric Cooper
- Attendance: 25,454
- Time of game: 7:08 PM CDT
- Ceremonial first pitch: 8 players from the final 8 schools in the 2019 College World Series
- Television: ESPN
- TV announcers: Karl Ravech (play-by-play); Eduardo Pérez (analyst); Kyle Peterson (analyst)

MLB in Omaha was a Major League Baseball (MLB) specialty game played between the American League (AL) Central's Detroit Tigers and Kansas City Royals on June 13, 2019. The game was played at TD Ameritrade Park in Omaha, Nebraska, two days before the start of that season's College World Series, held at the same venue. This was the first regular-season MLB contest played in the state of Nebraska. The game, sponsored by GEICO and broadcast on ESPN, was won by the Royals, 7–3.

== Background ==
In June 2018, MLB announced that the Tigers and Royals would play a regular season game at TD Ameritrade Park in Omaha, Nebraska. MLB wanted a way to connect College Baseball with Major League Baseball, and did so by scheduling an MLB game two days before the 2019 College World Series in Omaha.

== Game ==
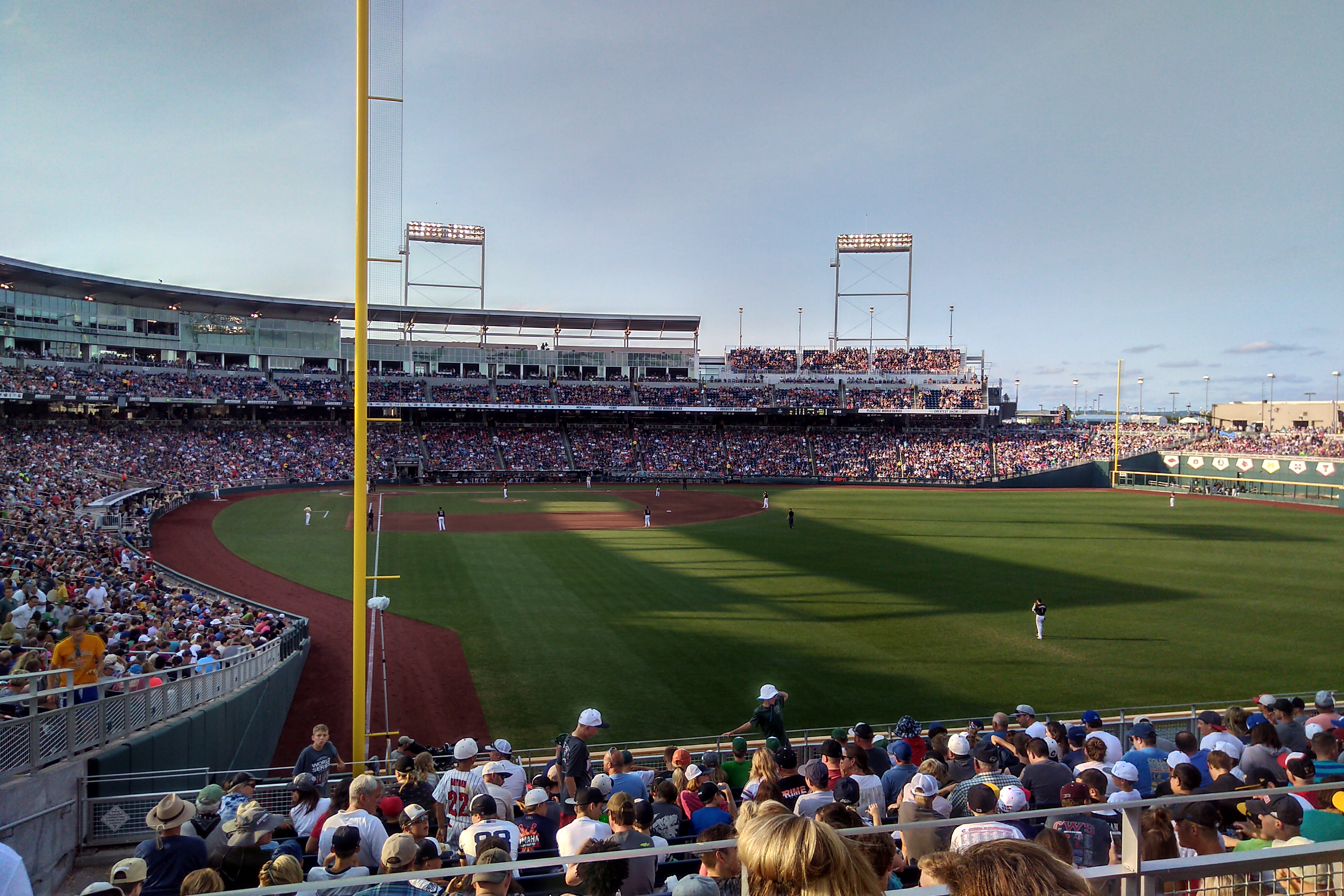
TD Ameritrade Park (Now Charles Schwab Field)

=== Recap ===
The Royals served as the home team, while the Tigers were the visitors. Matthew Boyd was the starting pitcher for Detroit, and Homer Bailey started for Kansas City. Nicky Lopez hit his first career home run where he played college baseball to start the scoring for the Royals. Homer Bailey pitched six scoreless innings and got the win while Matthew Boyd was given the loss. The Royals won the game 7–3.

=== Line score ===
June 13, 2019 7:08 p.m. CDT (8:08 p.m. EDT) at TD Ameritrade Park
Team	1	2	3	4	5	6	7	8	9	R	H	E
Detroit Tigers	0	0	0	0	0	0	1	1	1	3	7	1
Kansas City Royals	0	2	0	3	1	1	0	0	×	7	10	1
WP: Homer Bailey (5–6) LP: Matthew Boyd (5–5) Sv: Ian Kennedy (6); Home runs: Away: None; Home: Nicky Lopez (1); Attendance: 25,454 Time: 3:17; Umpires: Alan Porter, Joe West, John Libka, Eric Cooper

=== Box score ===
Tigers	AB	R	H	RBI	BB	SO	AVG
JaCoby Jones, CF	2	0	1	0	0	0	.257
Victor Reyes, CF	2	1	1	1	0	0	.500
Christin Stewart, LF	5	0	0	0	0	3	.241
Nicholas Castellanos, RF	3	1	0	0	2	1	.260
Miguel Cabrera, DH	4	0	1	0	0	1	.284
Ronny Rodriguez, PR–DH	1	0	1	1	0	0	.219
Brandon Dixon, 1B	4	0	2	0	1	0	.289
Niko Goodrum, SS	3	0	0	0	1	1	.230
Harold Castro, 2B	2	0	0	1	1	0	.262
Grayson Greiner, C	4	0	0	0	0	2	.161
Dawel Lugo, 3B	4	1	1	0	0	0	.242

Pitching

Tigers	IP	H	R	ER	BB	SO	HR	ERA
Matthew Boyd (L)	4	6	5	4	2	7	1	3.35
Carlos Torres	2	4	2	2	0	3	0	11.25
Austin Adams	2	0	0	0	2	2	0	7.00

Royals	AB	R	H	RBI	BB	SO	AVG
Whit Merrifield, RF	5	2	2	2	0	2	.294
Adalberto Mondesi, SS	5	0	0	0	0	2	.277
Cheslor Cuthbert, 1B	5	0	2	1	0	2	.333
Jorge Soler, DH	3	1	1	0	1	1	.245
Kelvin Gutierrez, 3B	4	0	0	0	0	1	.260
Nicky Lopez, 2B	4	2	2	1	0	1	.216
Martin Maldonado, C	4	1	2	1	0	1	.202
Terrance Gore, LF	2	1	1	0	2	1	.286
Billy Hamilton, CF	3	0	0	0	1	1	.227

Pitching

Royals	IP	H	R	ER	BB	SO	HR	ERA
Homer Bailey (W)	6	2	0	0	3	6	0	5.37
Jorge López	1	1	1	1	0	1	0	6.79
Kevin McCarthy	1	2	1	1	1	0	0	6.32
Wily Peralta	2/3	2	1	1	1	0	0	4.66
Ian Kennedy (S)	1/3	0	0	0	0	0	0	3.67

== See also ==
- List of neutral site regular season Major League Baseball games played in the United States and Canada
- College World Series
- 2019 College World Series
