= Charles Schwab Field =

Baseball park in Omaha, Nebraska

Charles Schwab Field Omaha
- "The Chuck"
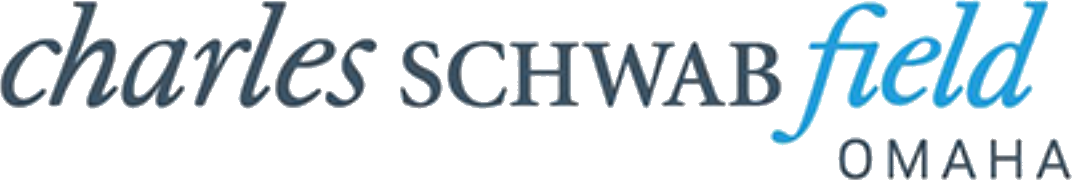

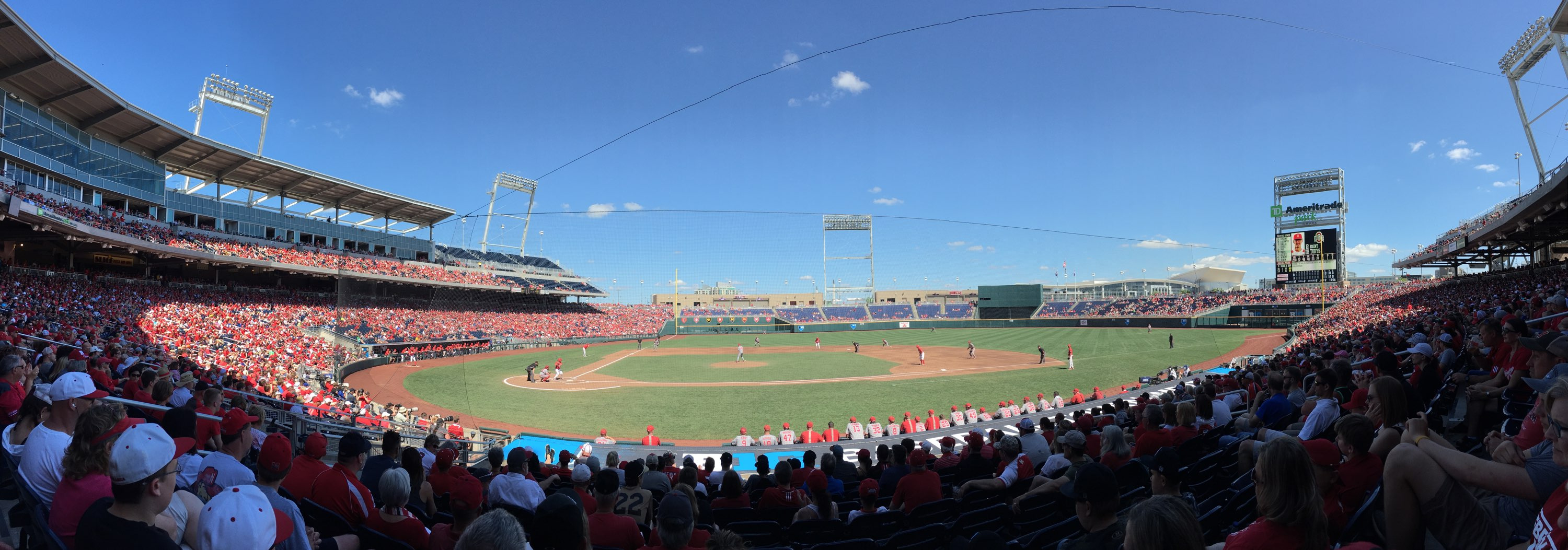
- Pictured in 2019
- Interactive map of Charles Schwab Field Omaha
- Former names: TD Ameritrade Park Omaha (2011–2022)
- Address: 1200 Mike Fahey Street
- Location: Omaha, Nebraska, U.S.
- Coordinates: 41.267°N 95.932°W
- Elevation: 1,010 ft (310 m) AMSL
- Owner: City of Omaha
- Operator: Metropolitan Entertainment and Convention Authority
- Capacity: 24,505 (expandable to 35,000)
- Surface: Kentucky bluegrass
- Scoreboard: 34 ft × 54 ft (10 m × 16 m) =$5.29 million (281 trillion colors)
- Record attendance: 28,846 (June 18, 2015) (LSU vs. TCU)
- Field size: Left Line – 335 ft (102 m); Left Center – 375 ft (114 m); Center – 408 ft (124 m); Right Center – 375 ft (114 m); Right Line – 335 ft (102 m)

Construction
- Groundbreaking: January 21, 2009
- Opened: April 18, 2011; 15 years ago (Open House)
- Cost: $131 million ($187 million in 2025)
- Architects: HDR Inc. DLR Group; Populous
- General contractor: Kiewit Corporation
- Main contractor: Nemaha Sports - Field Contractor/Construction

Tenants
- Men's College World Series (NCAA) (2011–present); Creighton Bluejays (NCAA) (2011−present); Omaha Nighthawks (UFL) (2011−2012); Omaha Mammoths (FXFL) (2014)

Website
- charlesschwabfieldomaha.com

Charles Schwab Field Omaha (formerly TD Ameritrade Park Omaha) is a ballpark in Omaha, Nebraska, United States. Opened in 2011, the city-owned stadium replaced the historic Johnny Rosenblatt Stadium, which was about two miles (3 km) south. The diamond is aligned southeast (home plate to center field) at an approximate elevation of 1,010 feet (310 m) above sea level.

Charles Schwab Field has a seating capacity of 24,000, with the ability to expand to 35,000 spectators.

The ballpark cost $131 million to construct.

The park turned a profit of $5.6 million in its first year of operation, easily covering its debt payments.

It is the home field of the Creighton University Bluejays, and the host venue of the College World Series (MCWS)—the final rounds of the NCAA Division I Baseball Championship. The MCWS (Note: The event's official name has been "NCAA Men's College World Series" since no later than 2008. However, the NCAA did not consistently use the word "Men's" in the event branding until 2022.) has been held in Omaha since 1950, and will continue to be hosted there through at least 2035. The Big Ten Conference has also held its baseball tournament at the venue, first in 2014 and 2016, and from 2018 onwards. Attempts were made to bring a professional baseball team to Charles Schwab Field, but legal troubles prevented this.

The Triple-A Omaha Storm Chasers (formerly Royals) of the International League opted for a smaller capacity venue at the new Werner Park, west of Papillion in Sarpy County. In 2021, after Charles Schwab Corporation acquired TD Ameritrade, the park was renamed Charles Schwab Field Omaha.

== History ==
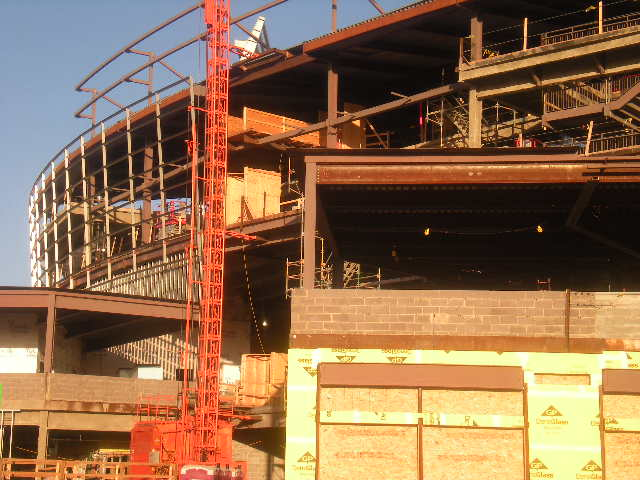
Steel structure being added; March 2010

Groundbreaking for the park occurred on January 21, 2009.

In June 2009, TD Ameritrade acquired the naming rights for the stadium, agreeing to pay $15 million over the following 20 years.

On April 15, 2010, it was announced that the Omaha Nighthawks, the local franchise in the United Football League, would play their first season in Johnny Rosenblatt Stadium and then move to the park for 2011 and beyond. The football gridiron was laid along a line extending from home plate down the first base line into right field. The United Football League suspended all play midway through its 2012 season and then dissolved afterwards, marking the end of professional football at the park.

In December 2010, it was announced that Omaha would host a six-day multi-genre music festival in July called Red Sky Music Festival. Concerts were to be held all day as well as nightly in the parking lots of the park as well as CenturyLink Center. The festival took place in 2011 and 2012.

The original Hammond organ from Rosenblatt Stadium has been restored and is used during games at Charles Schwab Field, although musician Lambert Bartak (retired after the 2010 CWS, died in 2013) would not be the organist.

On February 9, 2013, the ballpark hosted outdoor ice hockey at the "Mutual of Omaha Battles on Ice." The first game featured the junior Omaha Lancers and the Lincoln Stars of the USHL. The second game was a collegiate matchup between the Nebraska–Omaha Mavericks (now branded as the Omaha Mavericks) and the University of North Dakota, both then of the WCHA. (Note: Both Omaha and North Dakota now play in the National Collegiate Hockey Conference.)

In May 2014, it was announced that a franchise in the new Fall Experimental Football League, called the Omaha Mammoths, would play their home games at the park beginning in October. The Mammoths would only play one shortened season in Omaha.

In 2014 and 2016, the park hosted the Big Ten Conference's baseball championship. A four-year contract was soon reached to hold the tournament there from 2018 through 2022.

On June 21, 2018, Major League Baseball announced that a regular season game between the Kansas City Royals and Detroit Tigers would be played at the park on June 13, 2019, ahead of the 2019 College World Series. The Royals won the game, 7–3, with 25,454 people in attendance. This was the first MLB game ever played in Nebraska.

In 2026, two new video boards were added to the outfield. The project replaced the original right field board, and it added a brand new screen in left field. Ribbon panel displays were added to the second level, and a new LED lighting system was installed.

=== First game ===
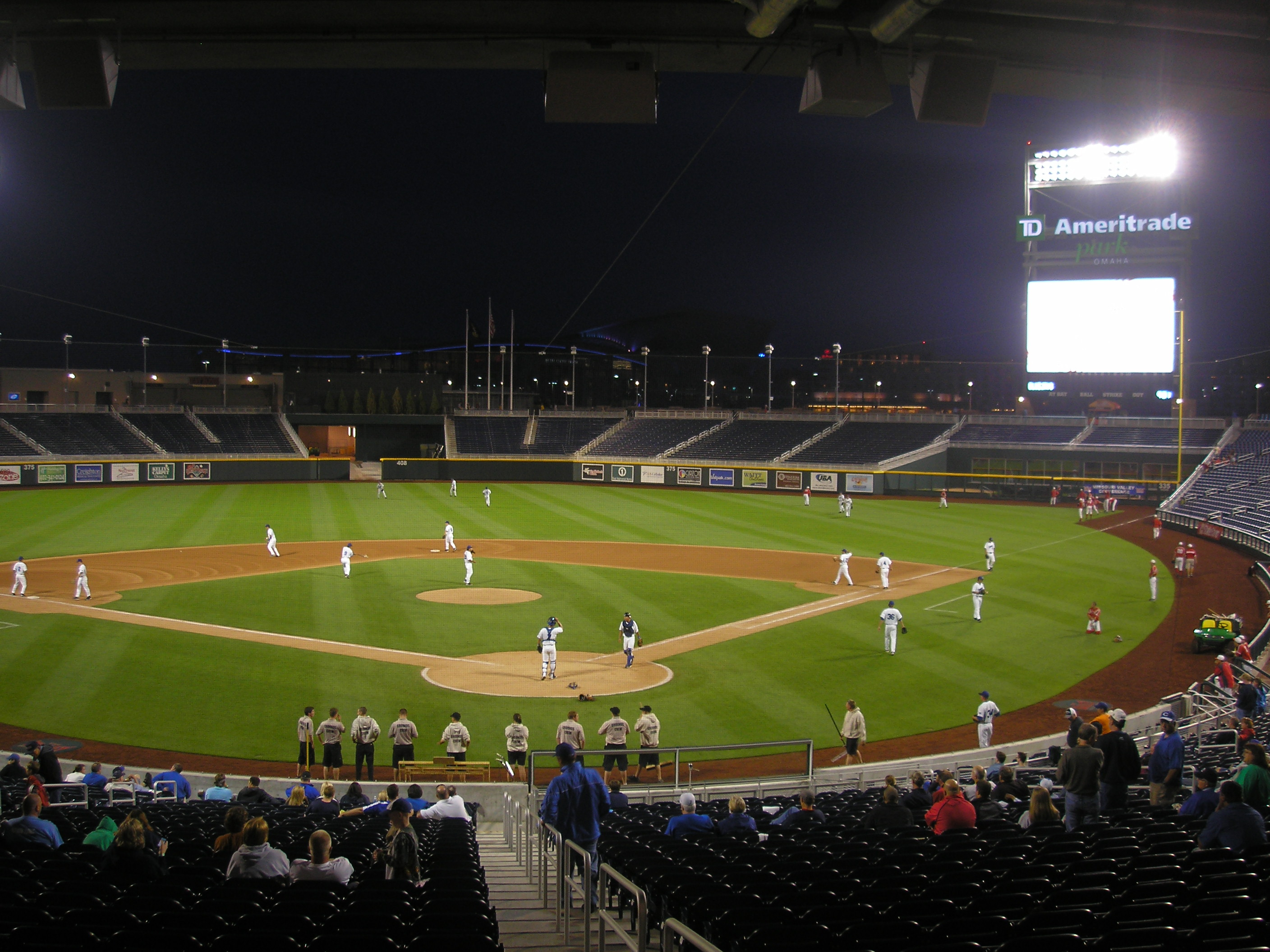
MVC Tournament; May 2011

The first regular season college baseball game was played on April 19, 2011, between the Nebraska Cornhuskers and host Creighton Bluejays. The ceremonial first pitch was thrown out by TD Ameritrade CEO Frederick Tomczyk. It was a game of many firsts for the park including first balk and first hamster races. The Cornhuskers won 2–1 in front of a paid attendance of just over 22,000 (a sellout) and a scanned attendance of just over 18,000, making it the most attended game of the collegiate regular season.

During its first season, the Missouri Valley Conference baseball tournament was held at the ballpark in late May, the third time Creighton had hosted the event.

=== First Men's College World Series ===
The park hosted its first MCWS (then branded simply as CWS) in June 2011. Participants were South Carolina Gamecocks, Florida Gators, Vanderbilt Commodores, Virginia Cavaliers, North Carolina Tar Heels, California Golden Bears, Texas A&M Aggies, and Texas Longhorns.

Before the opening game of the CWS between Vanderbilt and North Carolina on Saturday, June 18, the ceremonial first pitch was delivered by former president George W. Bush. Omaha Little Leaguer Henry Slagle had the honor of handing the ball to President Bush as his Memorial Park Little League team greeted the former president on the field. Before the pitch, his father, former president George H. W. Bush, who played for Yale in the first CWS in 1947, delivered a video message christening the new facility. Omaha's own Gene Klosner sang the stadium's first CWS national anthem prior to the game. Attendance for the first game was set at 22,745, standing room only, fans. The first CWS pitch at the new park was thrown by UNC's Patrick Johnson to Vanderbilt's Tony Kemp at exactly 1:11 p.m. Central Daylight Time. Vanderbilt's Connor Harrell hit the first CWS home run in the park in the sixth inning of the game, a two-run blast over the left field wall, as the Commodores went on to beat North Carolina 7–3.

The first CWS finals in the new ballpark began on Monday, June 27, at 7 p.m. between the South Carolina Gamecocks and their SEC Eastern Division Rivals, the Florida Gators, in front of 25,851 fans.

Other worthy notes about the park's first CWS were the Southeastern Conference's Eastern Division South Carolina, Florida and Vanderbilt completing a podium clean sweep, and the 2011 CWS All-Tournament Team being comprised completely of players from the SEC East.

This was also the first year in which the new BBCOR Composite baseball bat (Batted Ball Coefficient of Restitution) standard was ushered-in. Meant to reduce the speed of the ball off the bat while lessening the potential for injury to players, particularly pitchers. The new bat also proved to negate the long ball which has caused critics to claim that the new park is too large for the toned-down bats and makes the exciting home run ball a thing of the past in the CWS. Also, pitchers were held to a strict 25 second clock between pitches for the first time in the history of the College World Series. The pitch clock was instituted in an effort to shorten the games. In 2011, the average total session (game) time was 3:10 with the longest game at 4:25, the shortest at 2:38, the Championship game at 3:21 and only one of the 14 sessions took over four hours to complete.

== Attendance ==
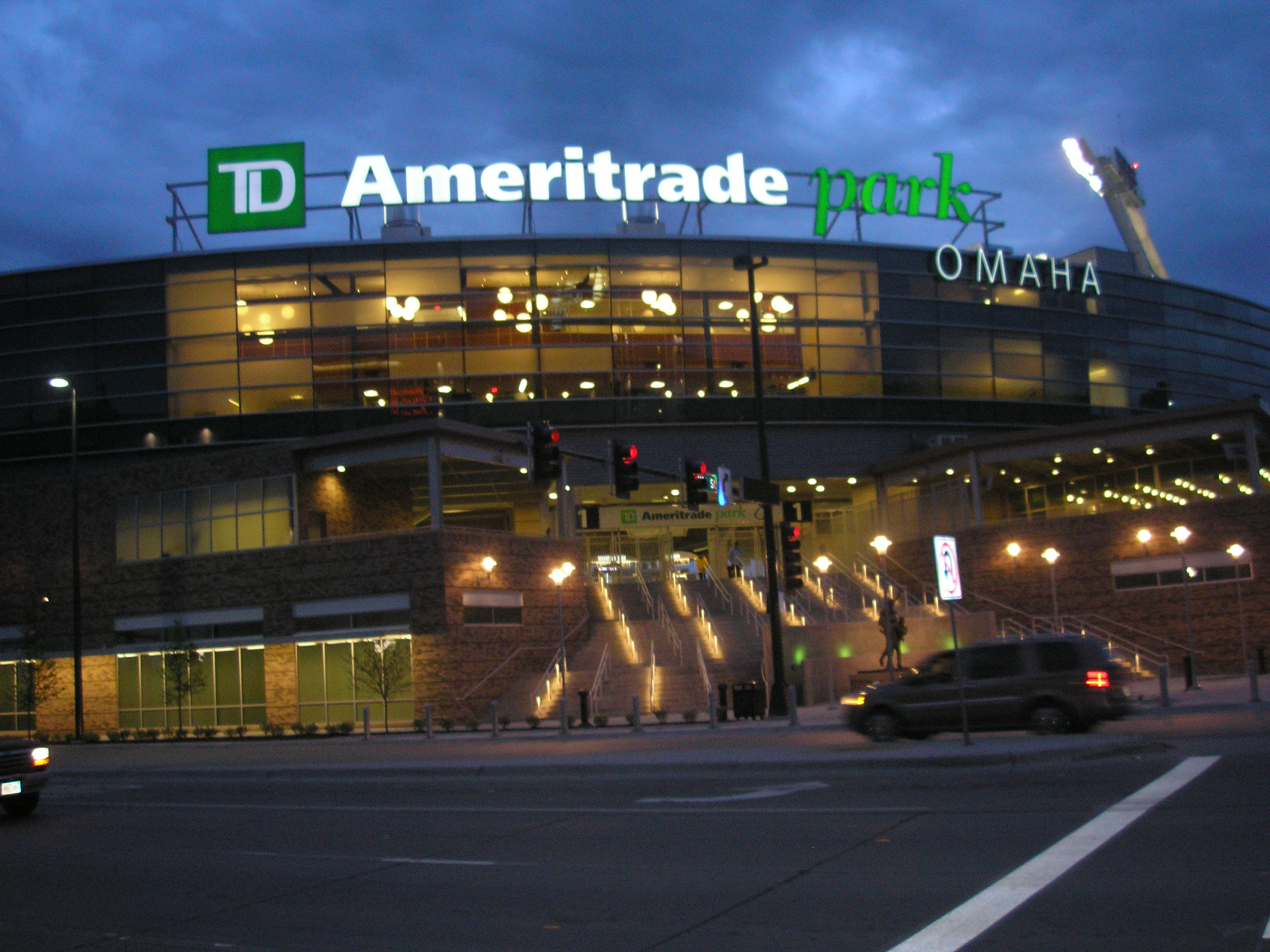
Entrance; May 2011

=== College World Series ===
The 2011 CWS, the first played at the park, consisted of 14 sessions with a total attendance of 321,684 for an average session attendance of 22,977. The 2011 total was both the highest since 2005 and 2,294 spectators more than the 2010 per-game average of 20,683.

In 2022, the first year in which the word "Men's" was added to the CWS branding, Ole Miss took home the Men's College World Series title after sweeping Oklahoma in the finals. The ballpark saw new records set for attendance as the 2022 MCWS set a new attendance record with 366,105 fans over 15 games in Omaha. That passed the record of 361,711 fans set in 2021. Sunday's final saw 25,972 fans, which was 1,467 over stadium capacity and the biggest crowd in a MCWS finals game since 2017.

The attendance record for the MCWS was broken again, for the third consecutive year, in 2023 as the event drew a total of 392,646 fans, an average of 24,559 per game. Both of those numbers are the best in the 73-year history of the event. This was in large part due to good weather (only one game had a weather delay) and the eventual champion, the LSU Tigers, playing in eight of the sixteen games. The total attendance in Omaha for CWS events has surpassed 11 million now, and stands at 11,719,319.

Charles Schwab Field is becoming well known for its lack of home runs leading to the idea that teams must play small ball to win. Nevertheless, KJ Harrison from Oregon State hit a grand slam—the first ever in the ballpark during the MCWS—to deep left-center field in June 2017, during a 13–1 win over Louisiana State University. The first grand slam in Charles Schwab Field was hit by Creighton in a game against Utah Valley.

=== Creighton ===
In 2013, Creighton ranked tenth among Division I baseball programs in attendance, averaging 4,041 per game.

=== Omaha Nighthawks ===
The Omaha Nighthawks competed in TD Ameritrade Park in the former United Football League. The highest attendance for a Nighthawks game at TD Ameritrade Park was 17,697, for the October 15, 2011 game against the Las Vegas Locomotives. The lowest attendance, almost exactly a year later on October 17, 2012, was 2,234, with the Locomotives also the opponent.

=== Big Ten Conference tournament ===
The first Big Ten Conference baseball tournament to be played at the park was held in 2014. The championship game of that tournament was attended by 19,965 spectators, which remains a record for single-day attendance at an NCAA conference tournament game. The Indiana Hoosiers defeated the Nebraska Cornhuskers, 8–4, to claim the Big Ten title. The tournament was once again hosted at the park in 2016. Beginning in 2018, the Big Ten Conference arranged for the park to host its tournament every season until 2022.

=== Concerts ===
On August 13 and August 21, 2023 respectively, Schwab Field hosted concerts by Def Leppard & Mötley Crüe with special guest Alice Cooper as part of The World Tour, and P!nk with special guests Grouplove, KidCutUp, and Brandi Carlile as part of the Summer Carnival.

== See also ==
- List of NCAA Division I baseball venues
- Sports in Omaha
- Downtown Omaha
- MLB in Omaha
