= Nashville Sounds all-time roster =

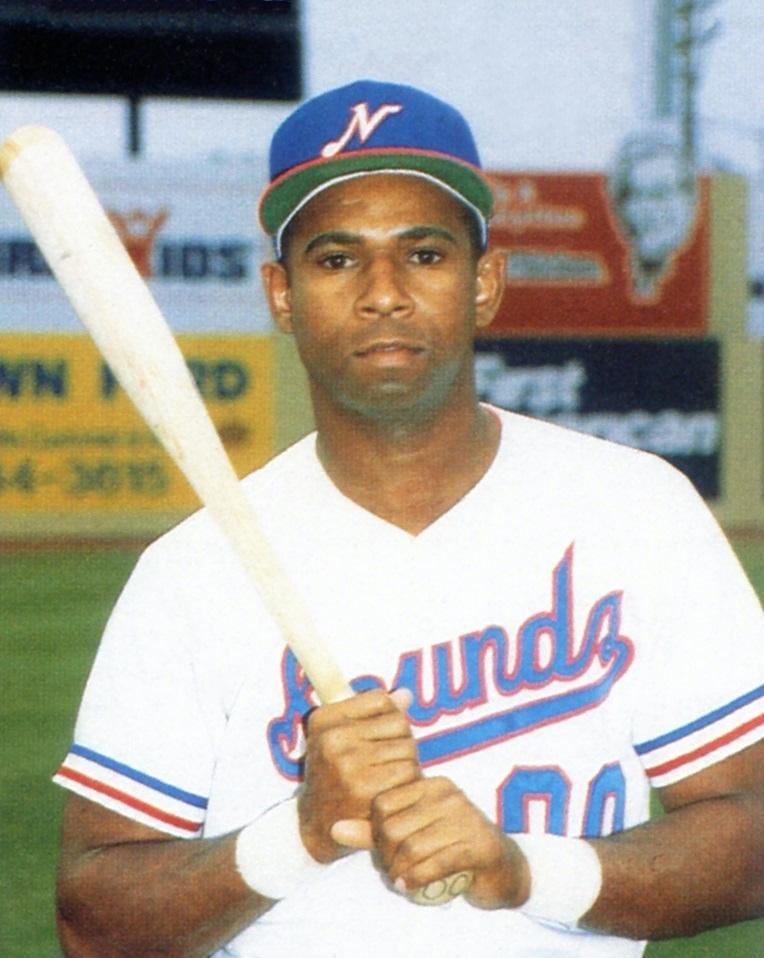
Skeeter Barnes played in 514 games for the Sounds, more than any other player in team history.

The Nashville Sounds Minor League Baseball team has played in Nashville, Tennessee, since its establishment in 1978. Through the completion of the 2026 season, 1,604 players have competed in at least one regular-season game for the Sounds. Of those, 1,154 have also played in at least one game for a Major League Baseball (MLB) team. Six additional players have appeared for the Sounds only in postseason games, one of whom has also played in the majors. Encompassing both regular and postseason play, 1,610 players have competed for Nashville; 1,160 of those have also played in Major League Baseball.

Created as an expansion team of the Double-A Southern League in 1978, the Sounds played in this league through 1984. At the Double-A classification, Nashville was affiliated with Major League Baseball's Cincinnati Reds (1978–1979) and New York Yankees (1980–1984). The Sounds moved up to Triple-A in 1985 as members of the American Association, joined the Pacific Coast League in 1998, and were placed in the Triple-A East in 2021 before it was renamed the International League in 2022. At Tripe-A, they have been affiliates of the Detroit Tigers (1985–1986), Cincinnati Reds (1987–1992), Chicago White Sox (1993–1997), Pittsburgh Pirates (1998–2004), Milwaukee Brewers (2005–2014), Oakland Athletics (2015–2018), Texas Rangers (2019–2020), and Milwaukee Brewers (2021–present).

Ninety-two of the team's players have distinguished themselves after their playing time with Nashville by winning a Major League Baseball award, being named to a major league All-Star team, or being elected to the National Baseball Hall of Fame. Ryan Braun, Barry Larkin, Don Mattingly, and Willie McGee have won the Most Valuable Player (MVP) Award. R. A. Dickey, Doug Drabek, and Jacob Misiorowski have won the Cy Young Award. Jason Bay, Ryan Braun, and Chris Sabo have won the Rookie of the Year Award. Don Mattingly, Bob Melvin, and Buck Showalter have won the Manager of the Year Award. Prince Fielder and Aramis Ramírez have won the Hank Aaron Award. Nelson Cruz and Khris Davis have won the Edgar Martínez Award. John Axford, Keith Foulke, Trevor Hoffman, and Jeff Montgomery won the Rolaids Relief Man Award. Liam Hendriks has won the Reliever of the Year Award. Prince Fielder and Liam Hendriks have won the Comeback Player of the Year Award. Jake Bauers, Lorenzo Cain, Nelson Cruz, Rob Dibble, Alcides Escobar, and Freddy Peralta have won the League Championship Series MVP Award. José Rijo and Ben Zobrist have won the World Series MVP Award. Nelson Cruz and Barry Larkin have won the Roberto Clemente Award. Twenty-three alumni have won the Rawlings Gold Glove Award; five have won the Wilson Defensive Player of the Year Award, including Matt Chapman as the Wilson Overall Defensive Player of the Year; and seventeen have won the Silver Slugger Award. Seventy-seven former players have been selected to play in the Major League Baseball All-Star Game, including Prince Fielder as All-Star Game MVP. Ten players have been selected for the All-MLB Team. Trevor Hoffman, Barry Larkin, and Tim Raines have been elected to the National Baseball Hall of Fame.

== Players ==
General key
Position(s)	The player's primary fielding position(s) (Note: Players are listed at a position if they appeared in 30% of their games or more at that position during their Sounds career, as defined by Baseball Reference. Players failing to meet this threshold are listed at their most-played position.)
MLB	Indicates if a player has played in at least one game for a Major League Baseball team
*	Appeared only in the postseason
†	MLB award winner or All-Star after playing for the Sounds

Positions key
P	Pitcher	3B	Third baseman	RF	Right fielder
C	Catcher	SS	Shortstop	OF	Outfielder
1B	First baseman	LF	Left fielder	DH	Designated hitter
2B	Second baseman	CF	Center fielder	PH	Pinch hitter

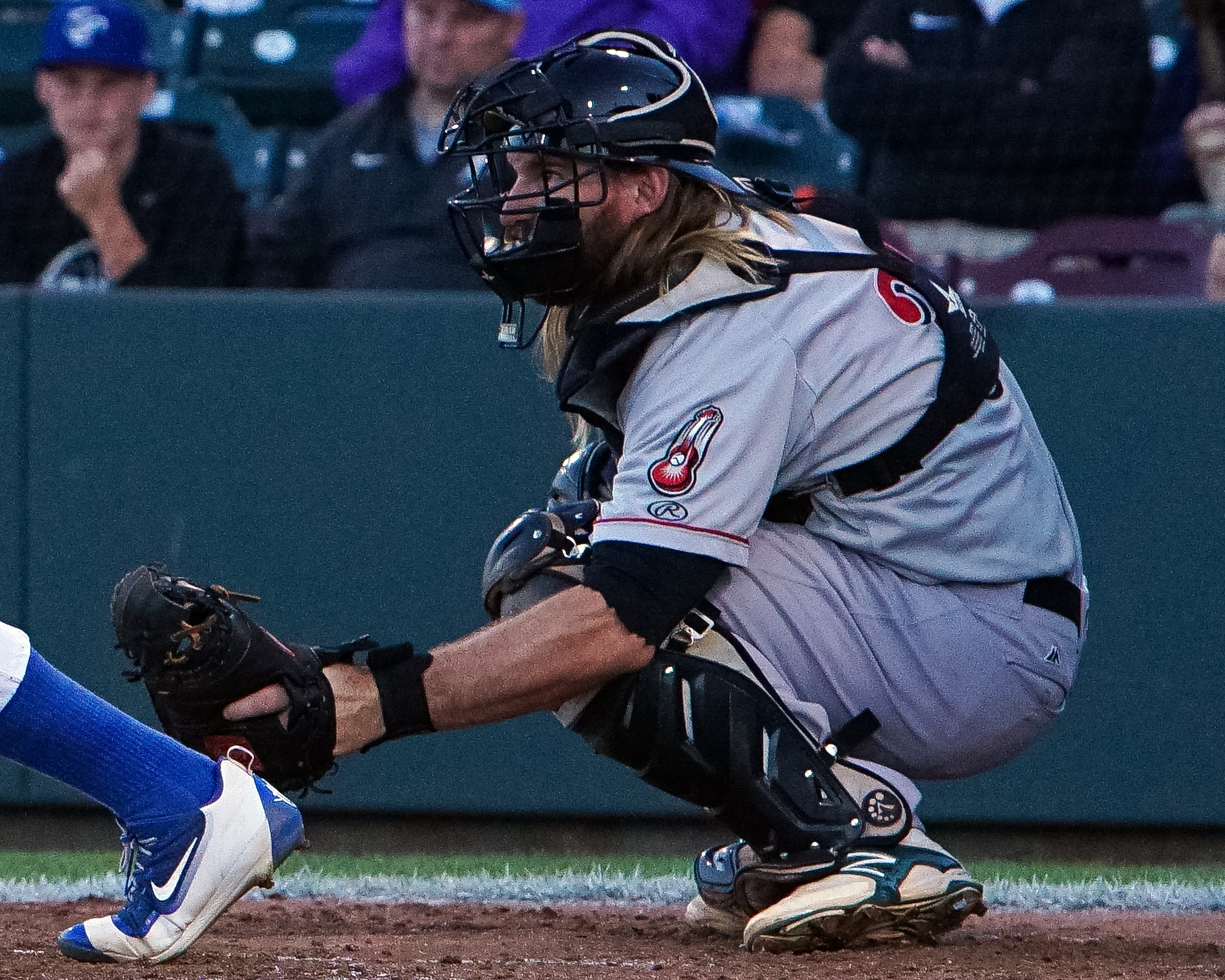
Bryan Anderson, catcher (2015–2016)

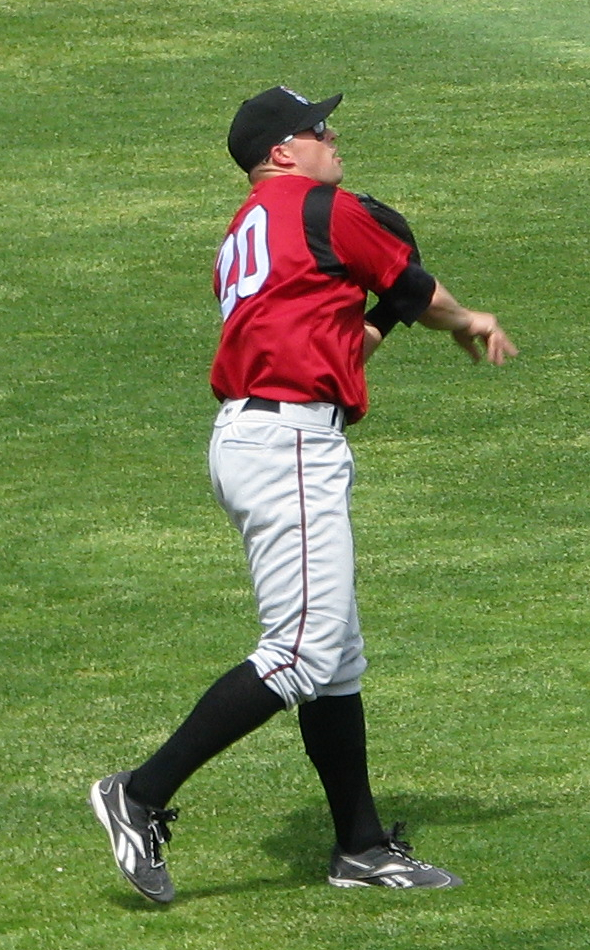
Drew Anderson, left fielder (2006–2007, 2009–2010)

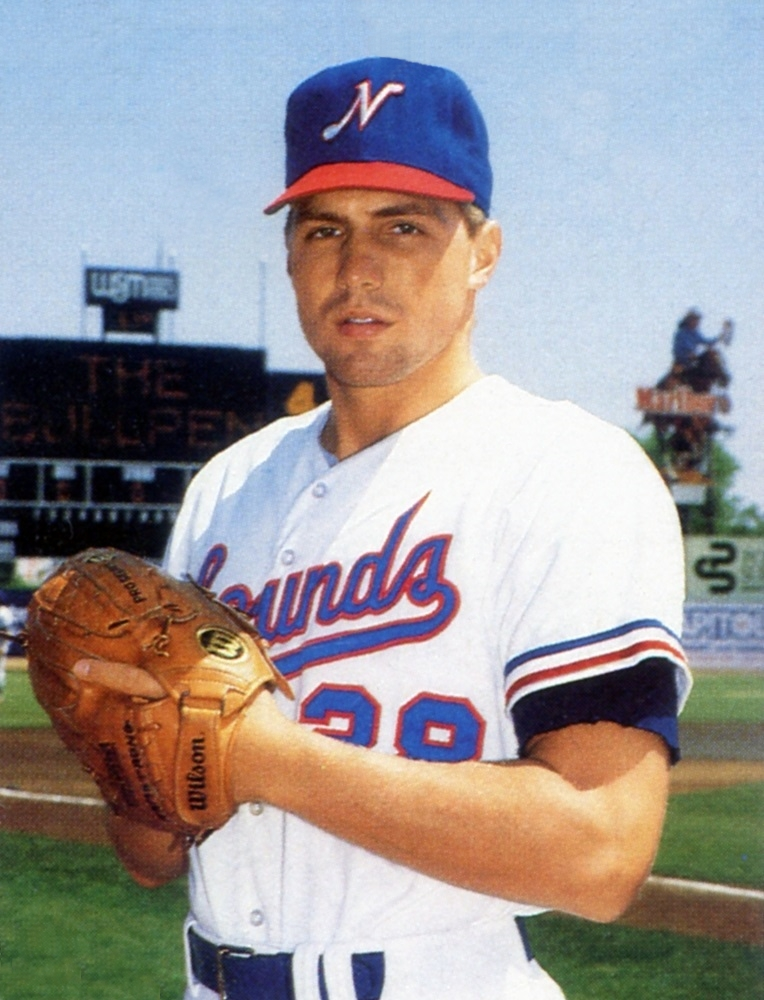
Jack Armstrong, pitcher (1988–1989, 1991)

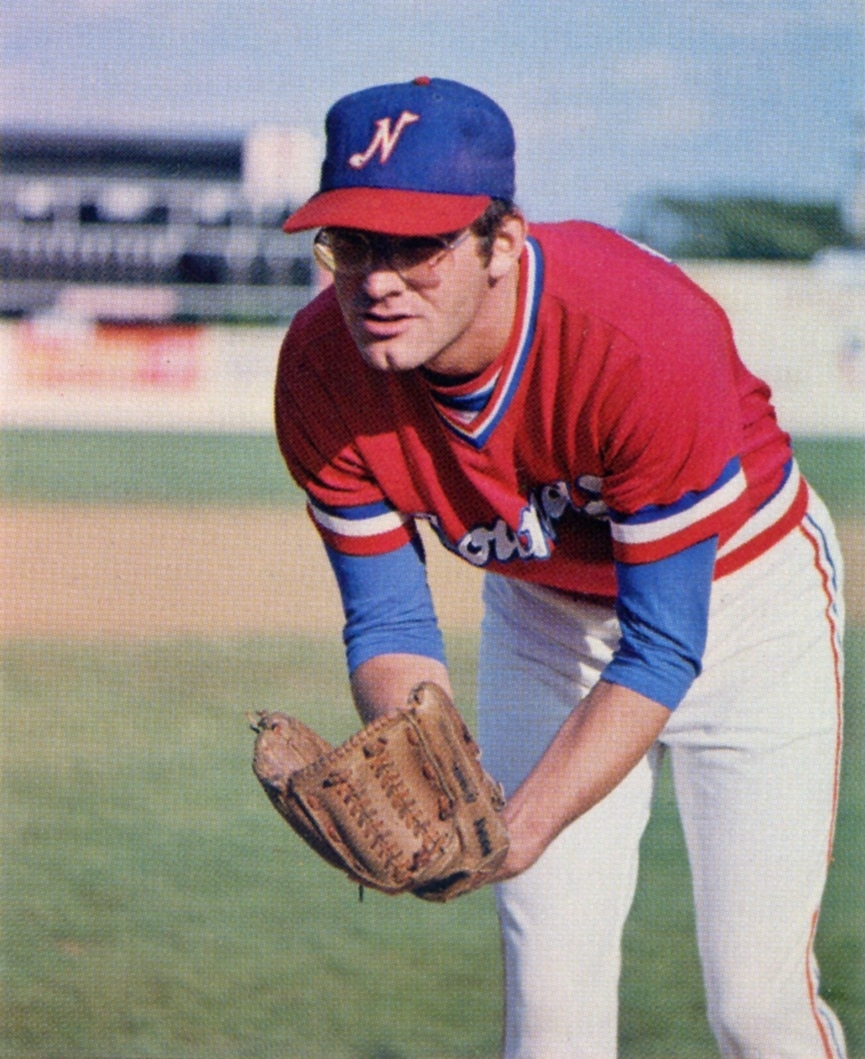
Mike Armstrong, pitcher (1979)

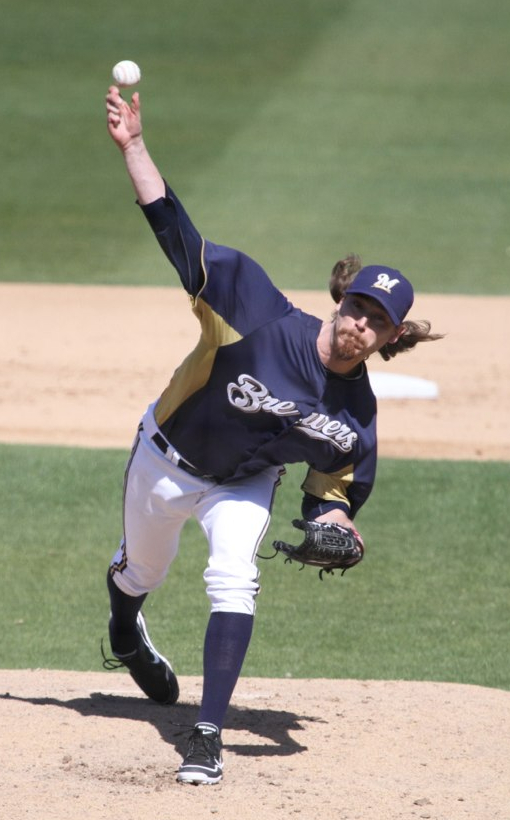
John Axford, pitcher (2009–2010, 2017)

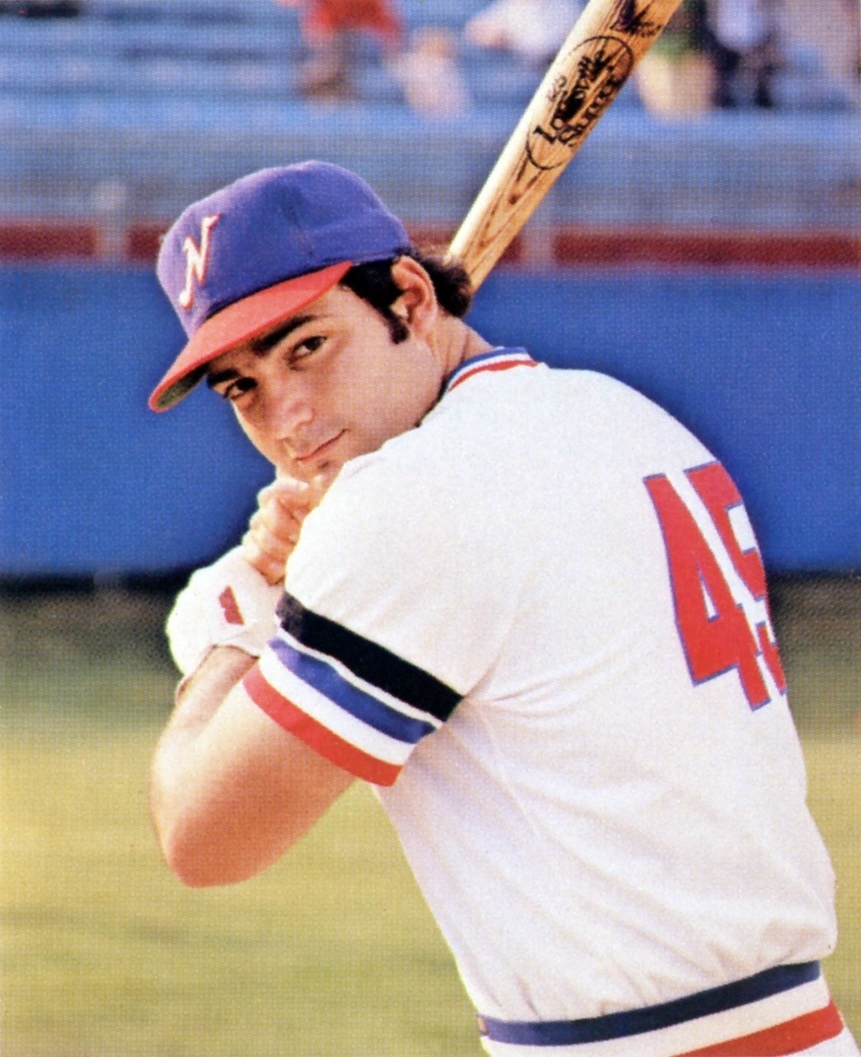
Steve Balboni, first baseman (1980)

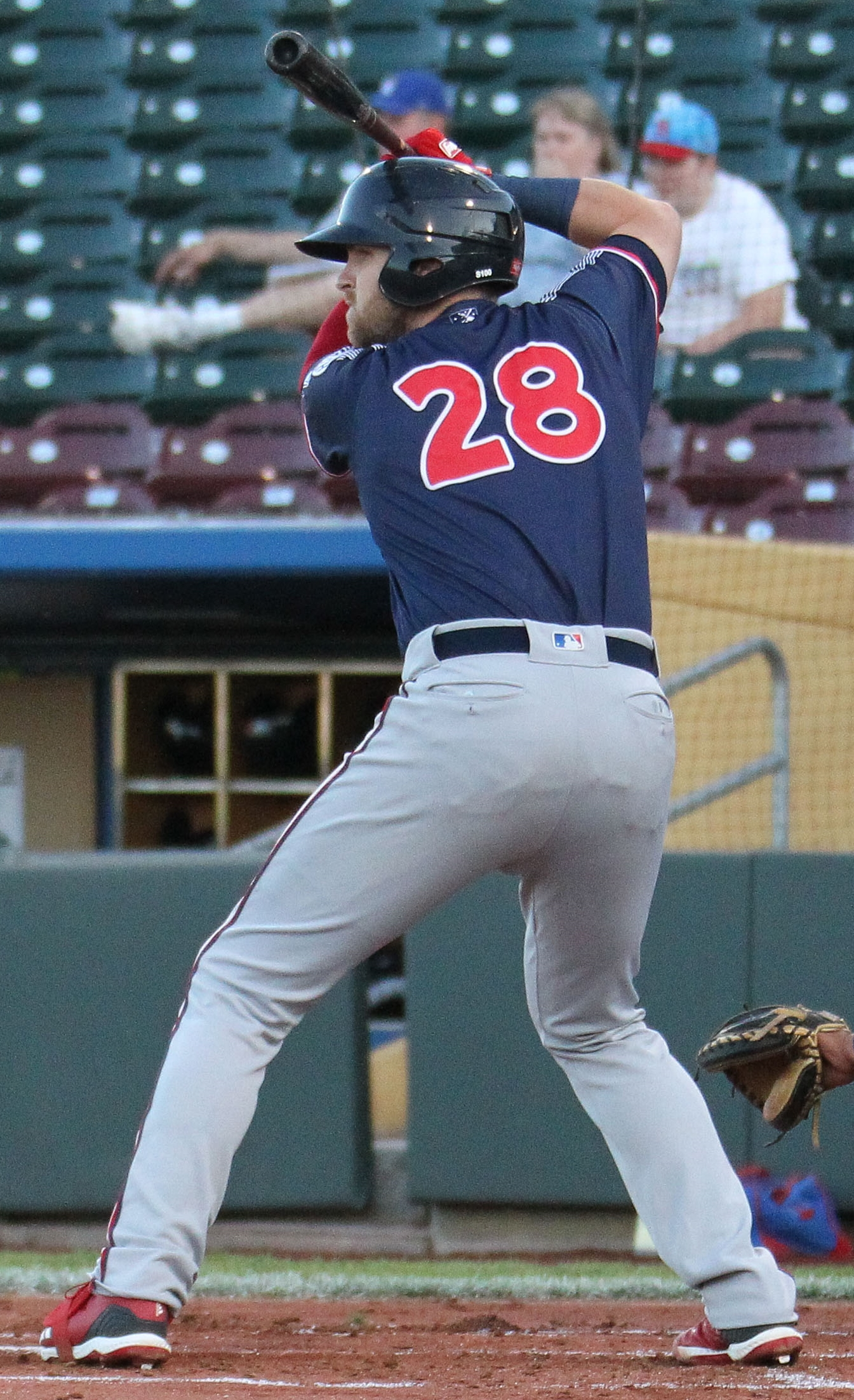
Jett Bandy, catcher (2019)

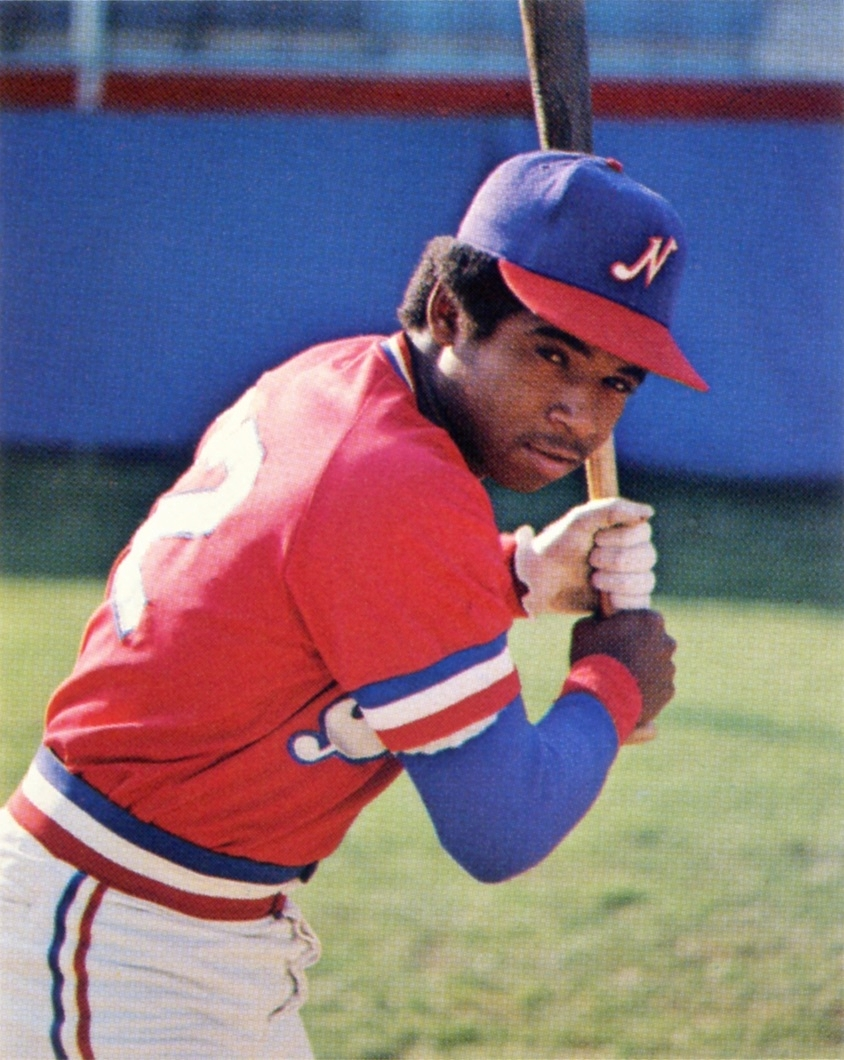
Skeeter Barnes, outfielder (1979, 1988–1990)

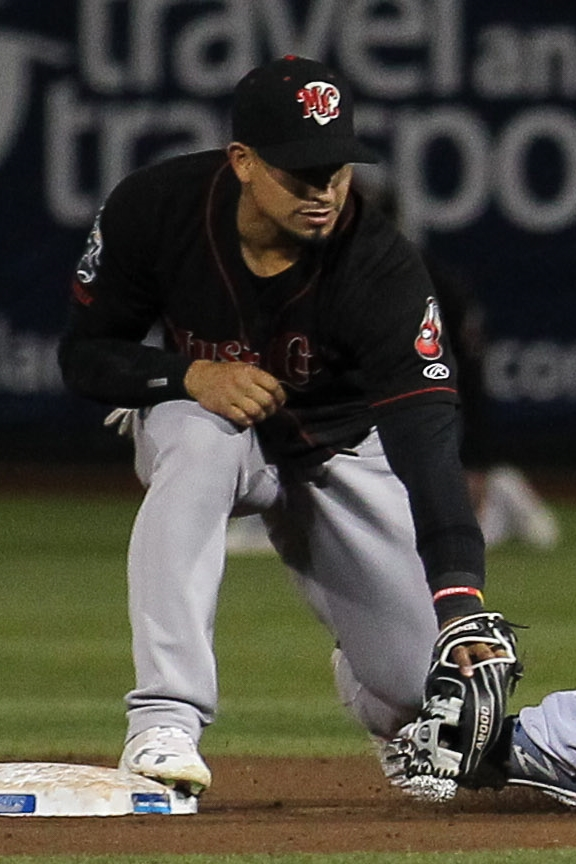
Franklin Barreto, shortstop and second baseman (2016–2018)

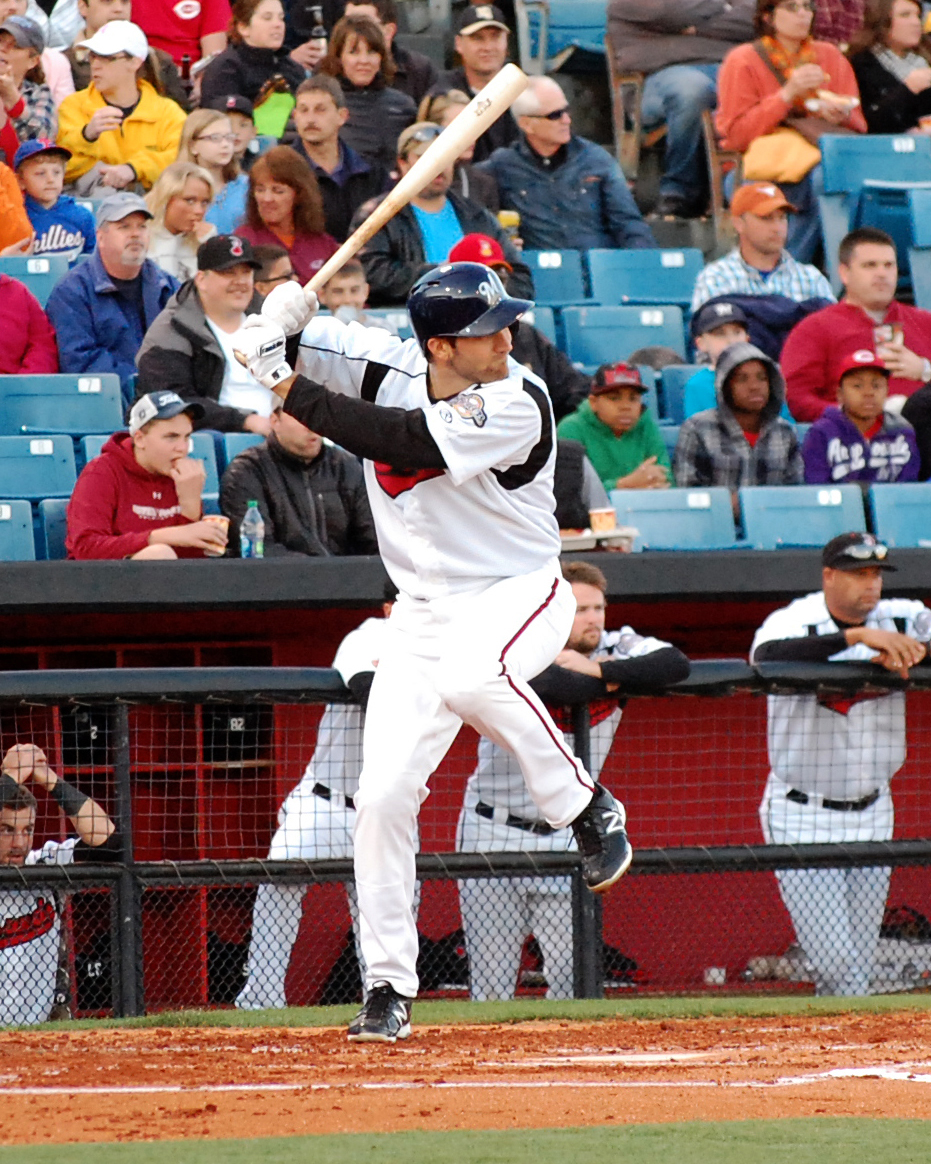
Jeff Bianchi, shortstop (2012–2014)

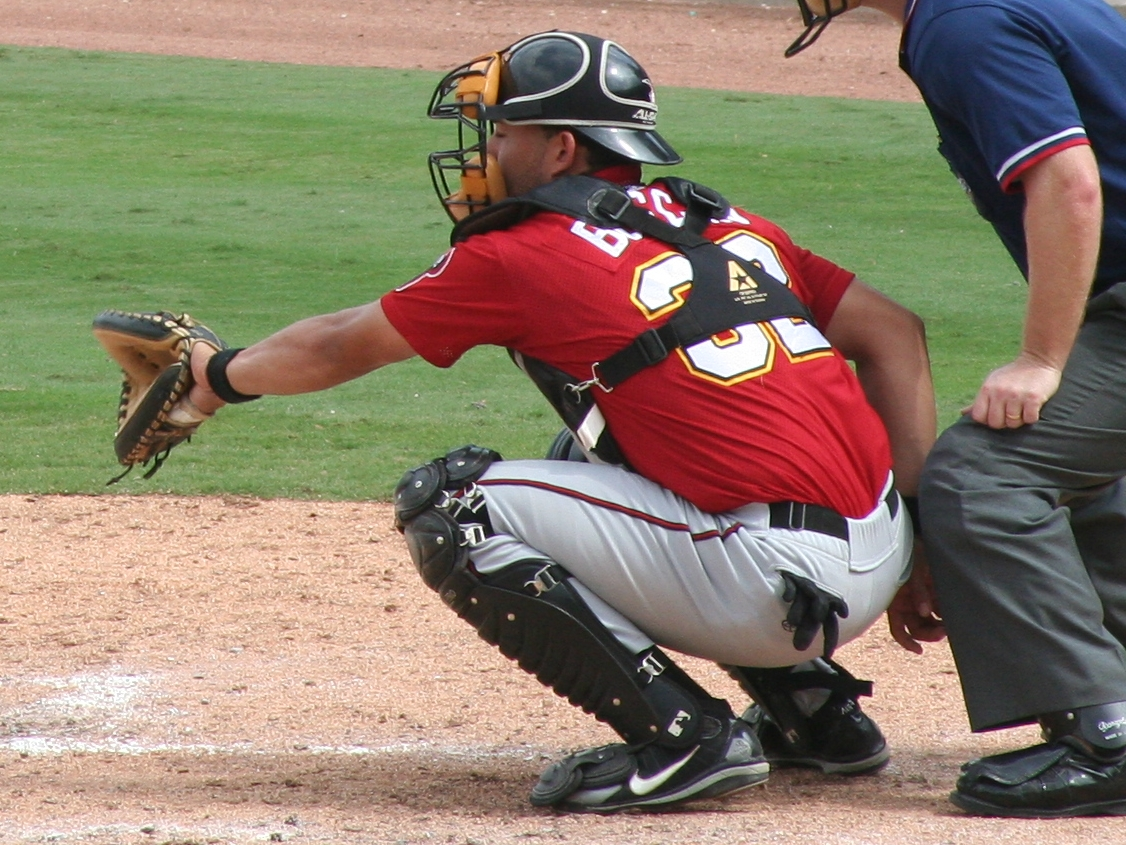
J. C. Boscán, catcher (2006)

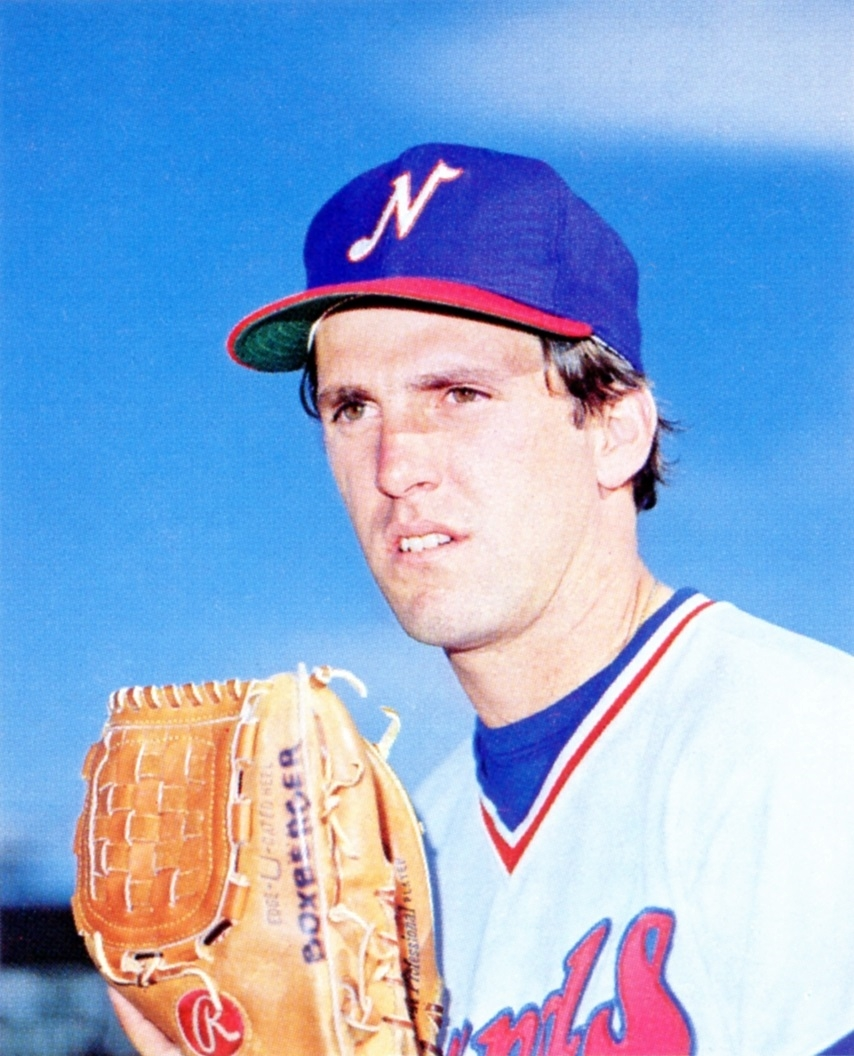
Rod Boxberger, pitcher (1981)

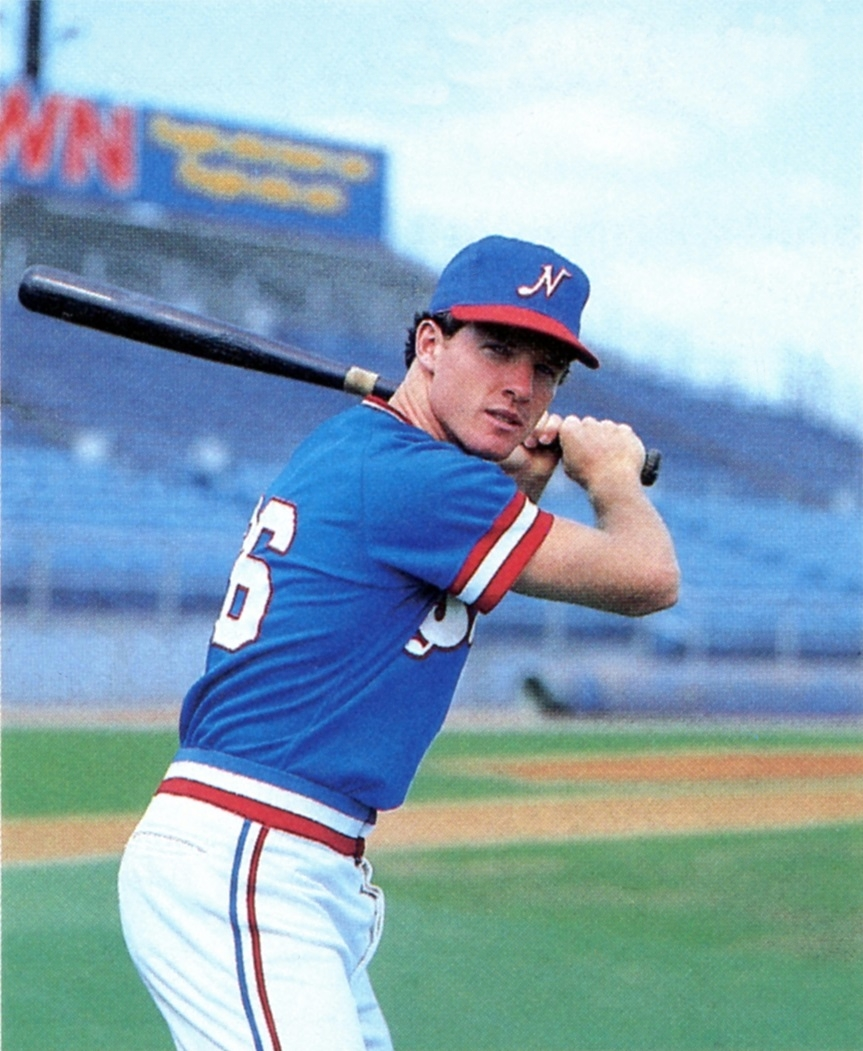
Scott Bradley, catcher (1982–1983, 1992)

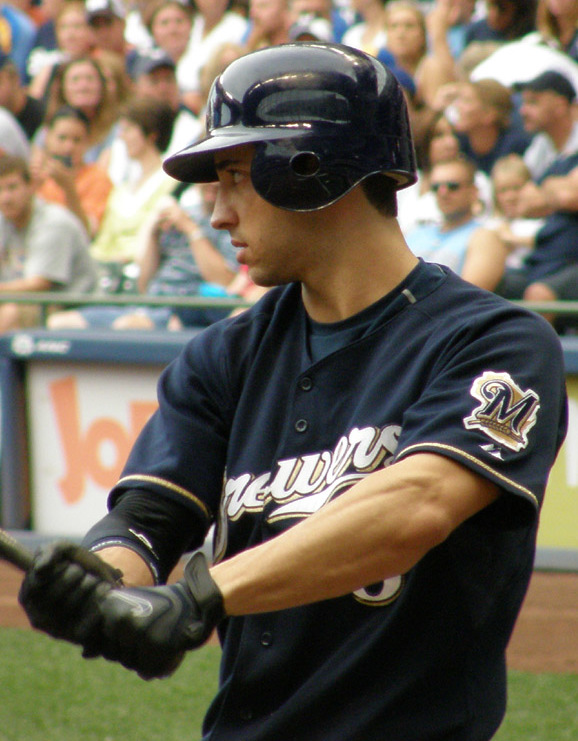
Ryan Braun, third baseman (2007)

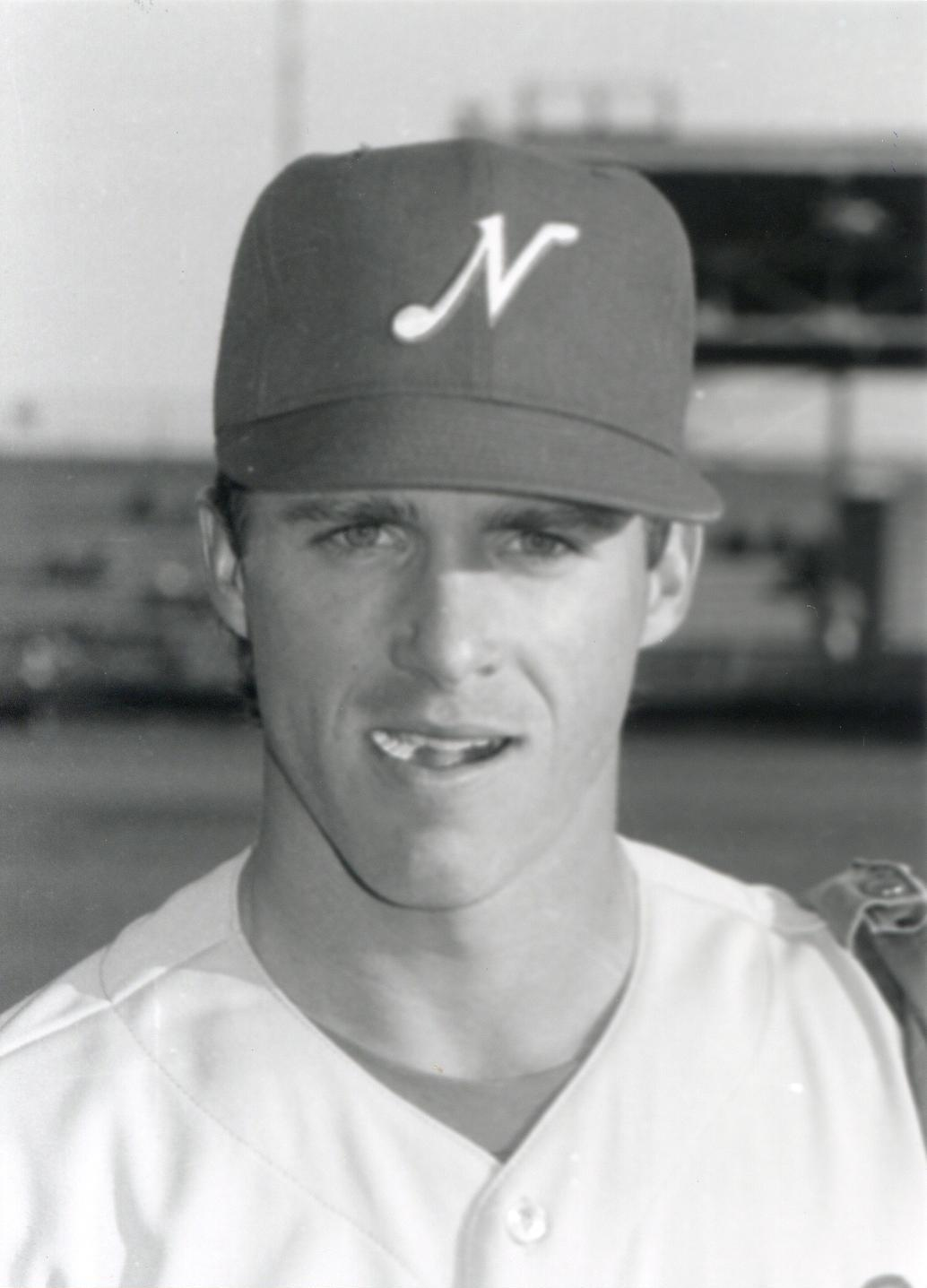
Marty Brown, third baseman (1988–1989)

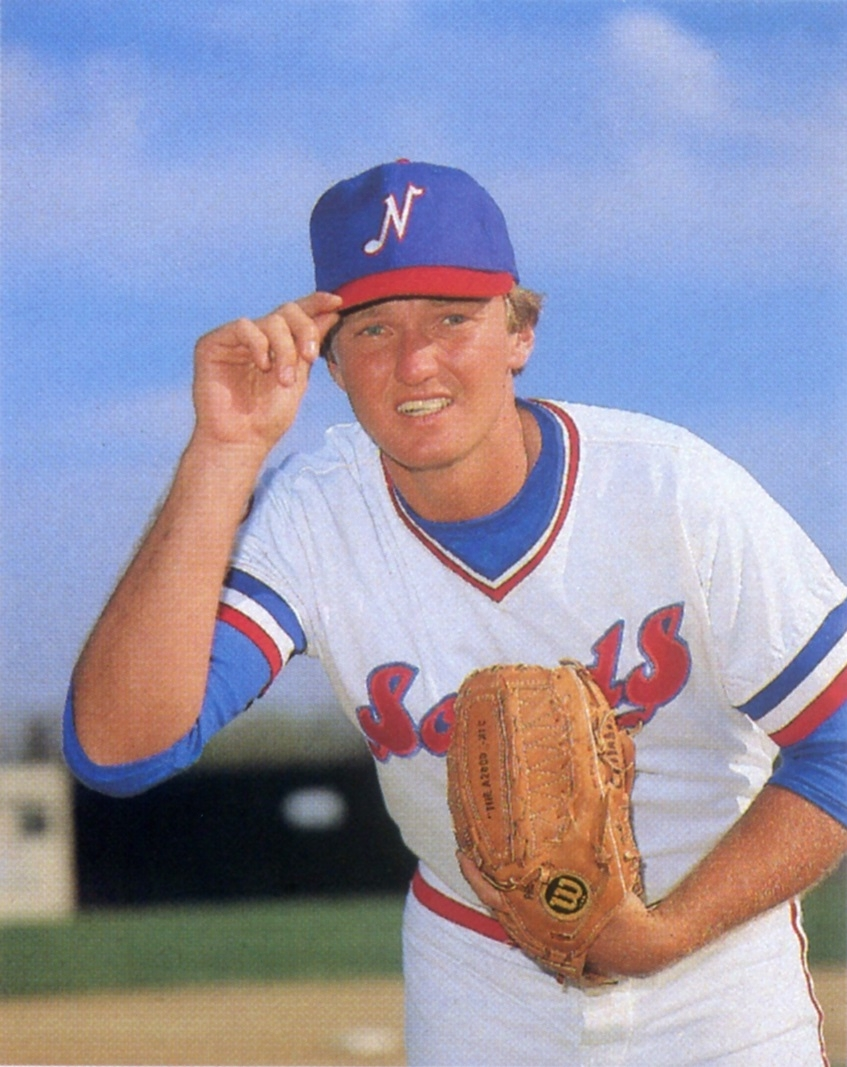
Ben Callahan, pitcher (1982–1984)

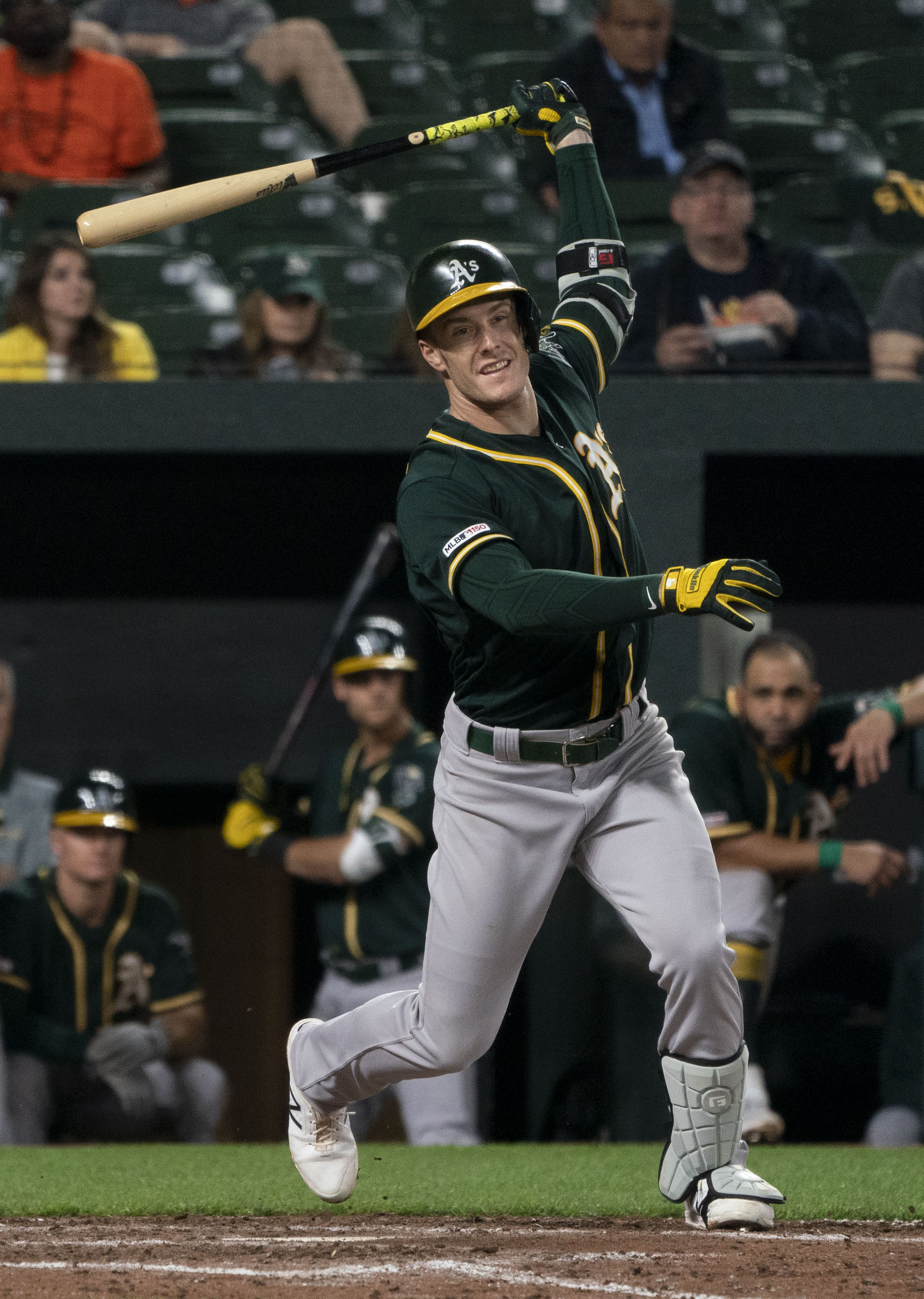
Mark Canha, right fielder (2017–2018)

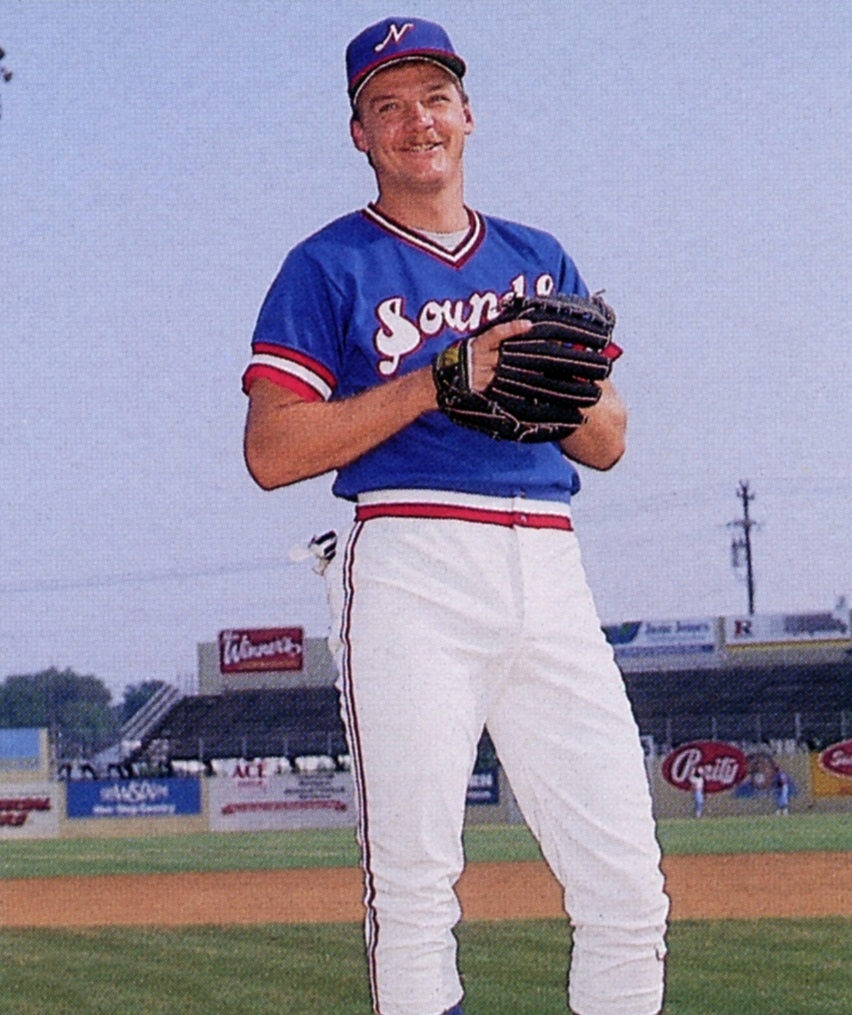
Chuck Cary, pitcher (1985–1986, 1993)

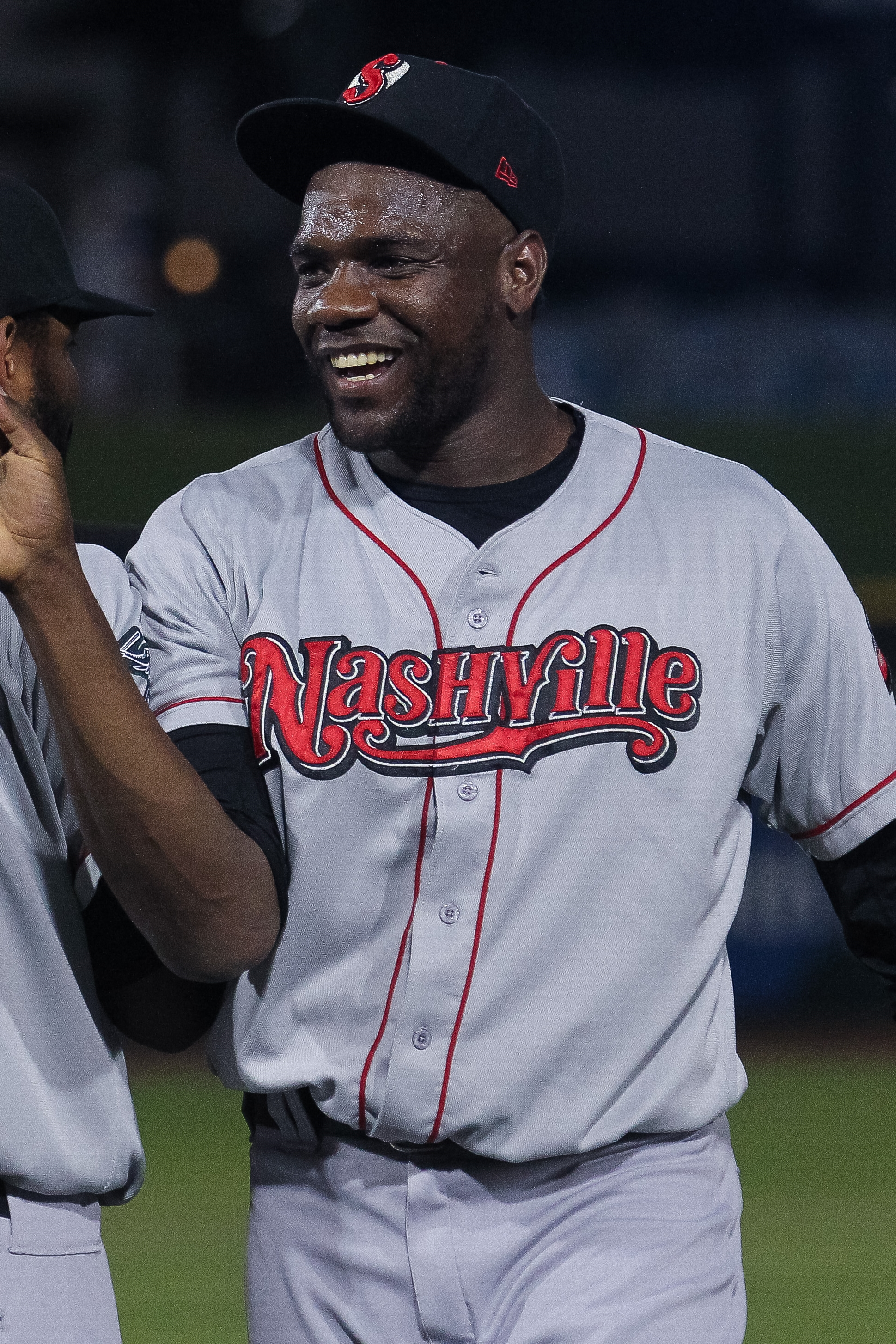
Simón Castro, pitcher (2017)

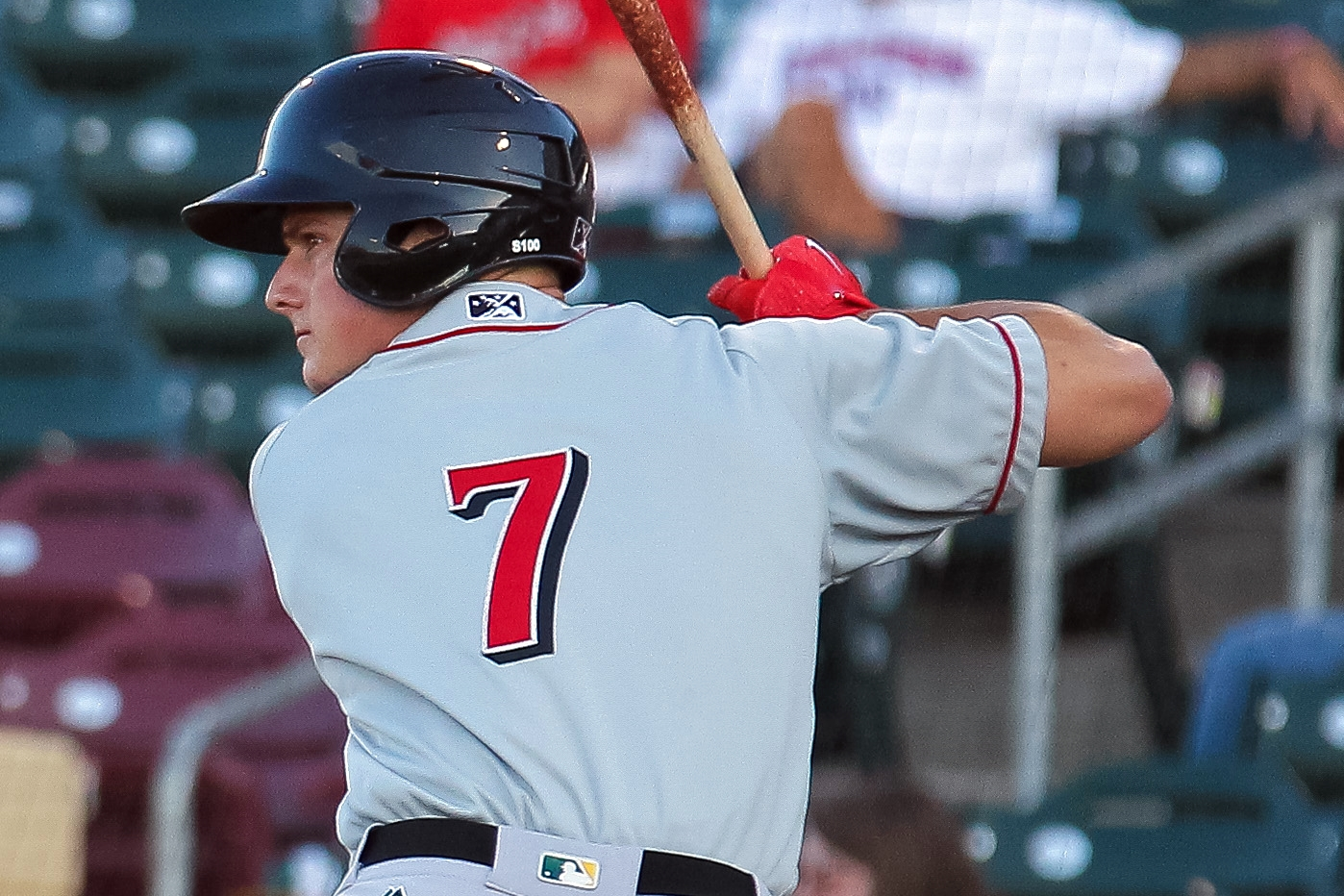
Matt Chapman, third baseman (2016–2017)

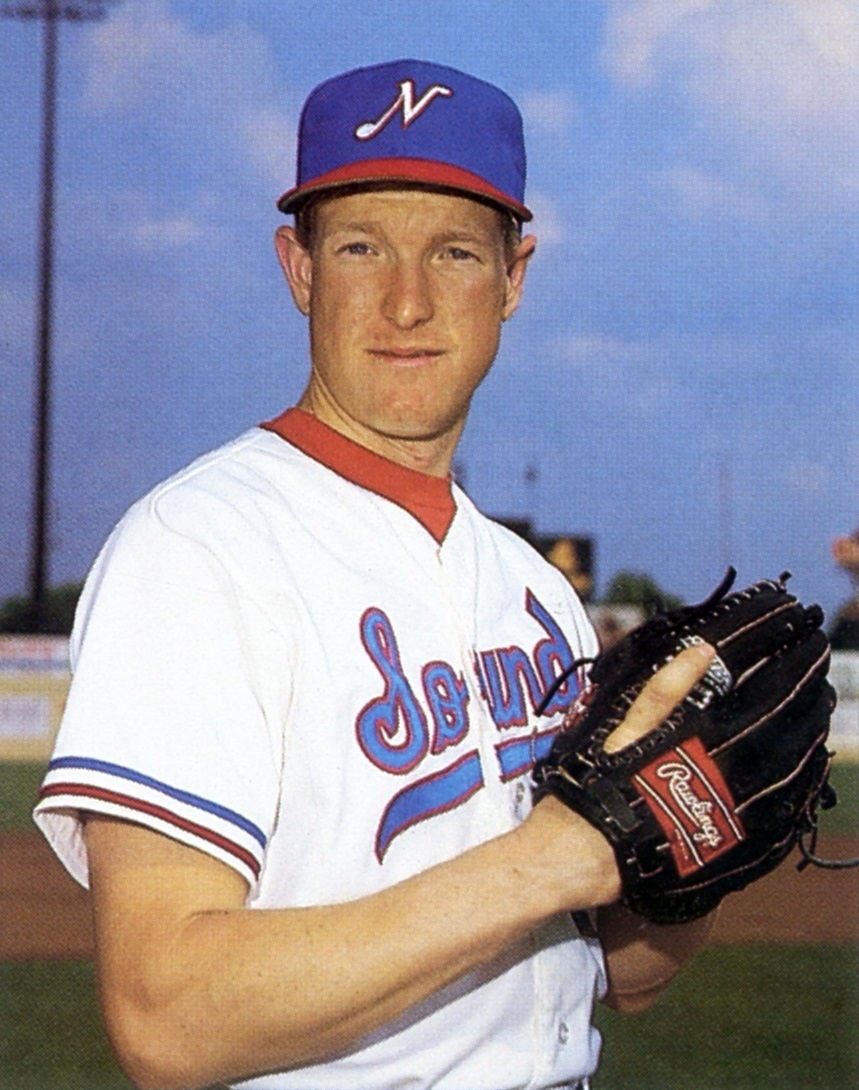
Norm Charlton, pitcher (1987–1988)

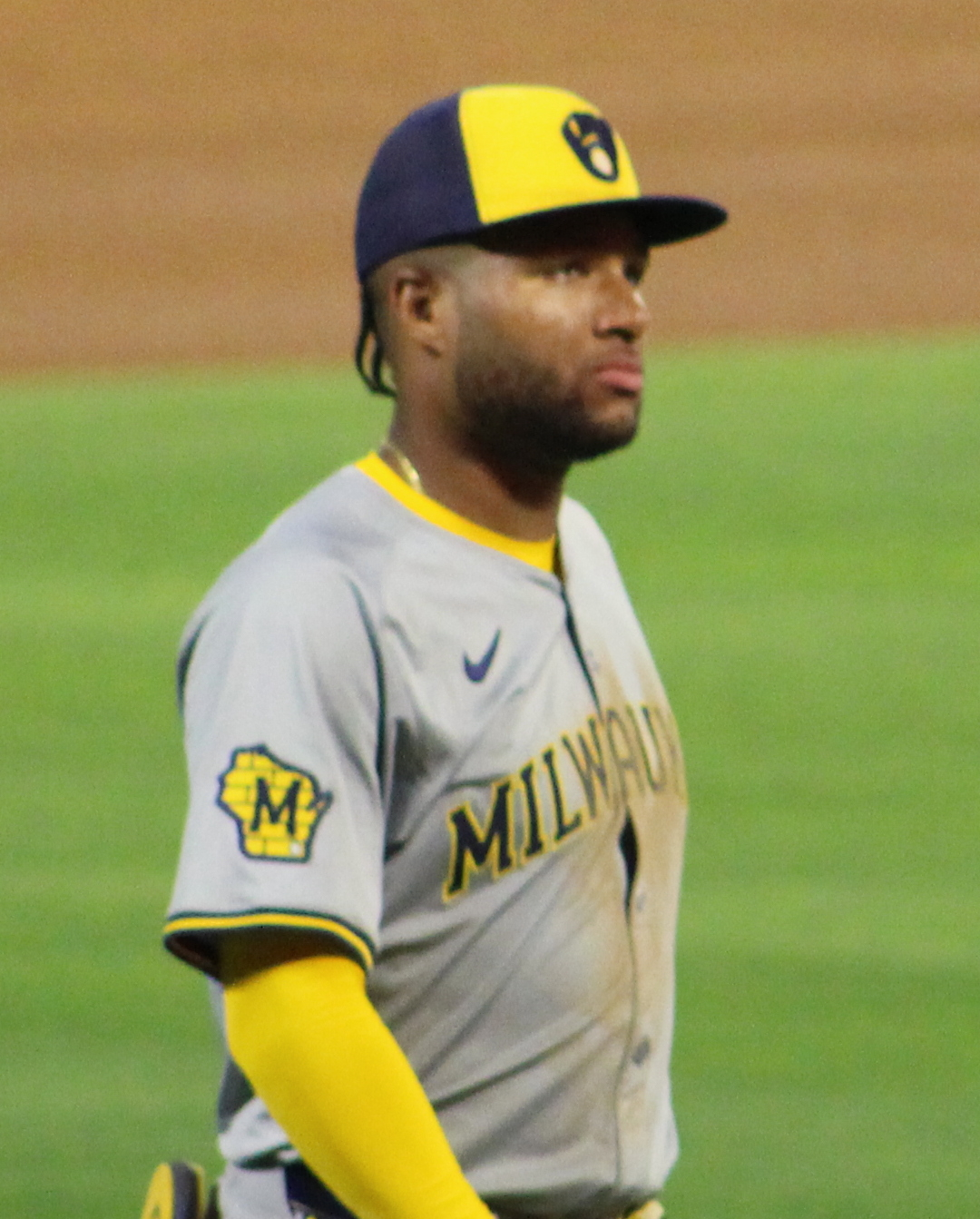
Jackson Chourio, center fielder and right fielder (2023, 2025–2026)

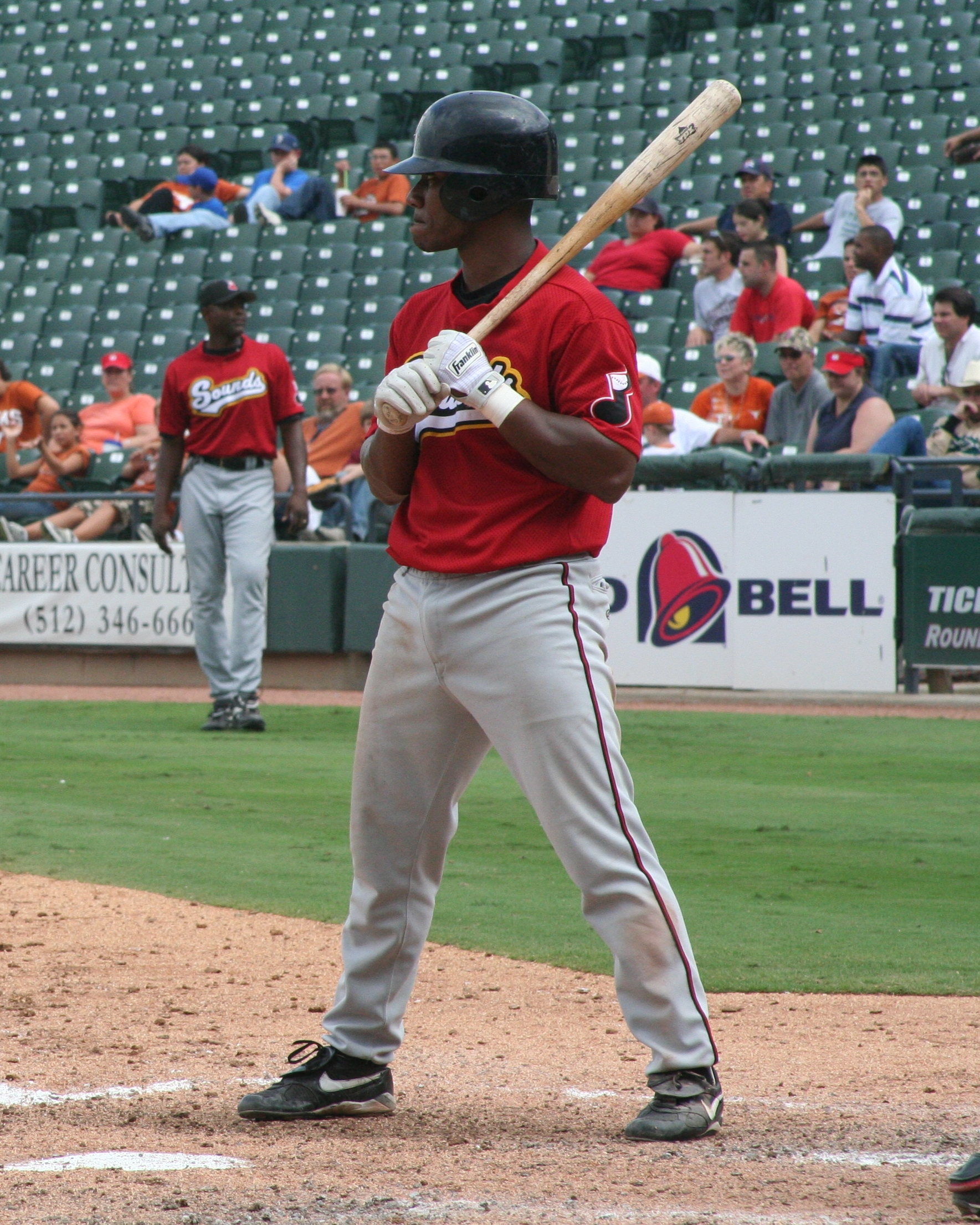
Jermaine Clark, second and third baseman (2006)

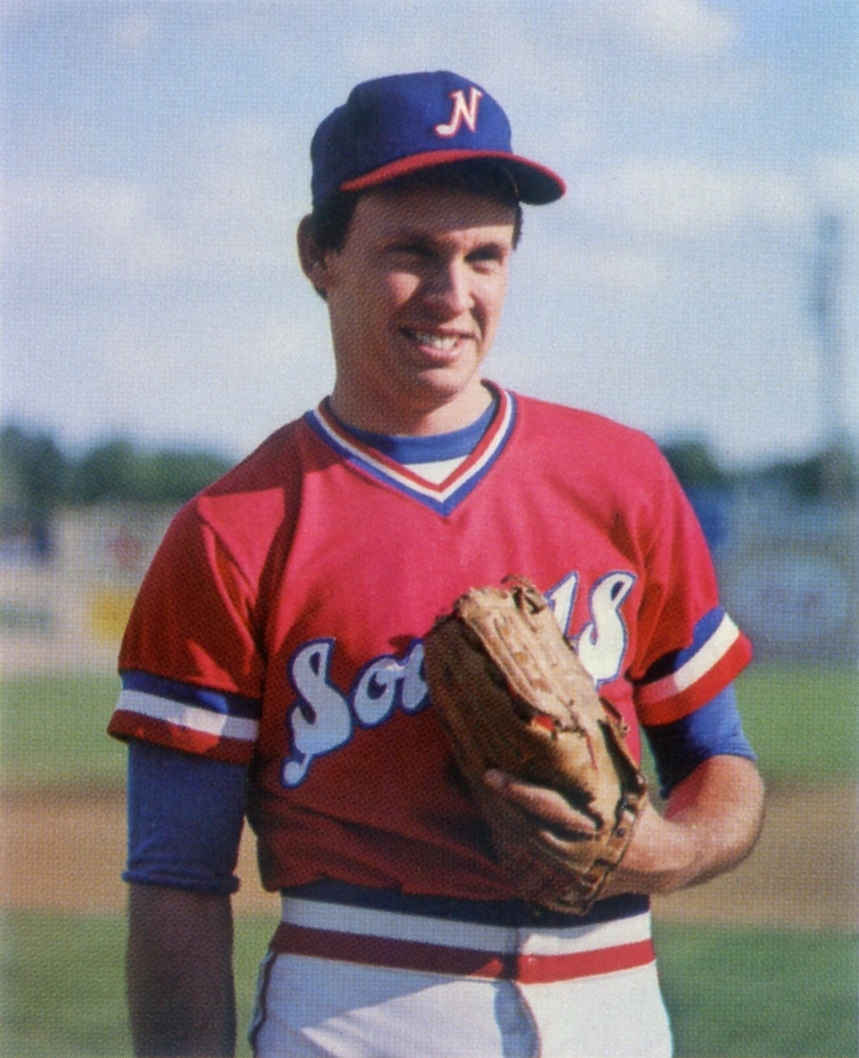
Geoff Combe, pitcher (1978–1979)

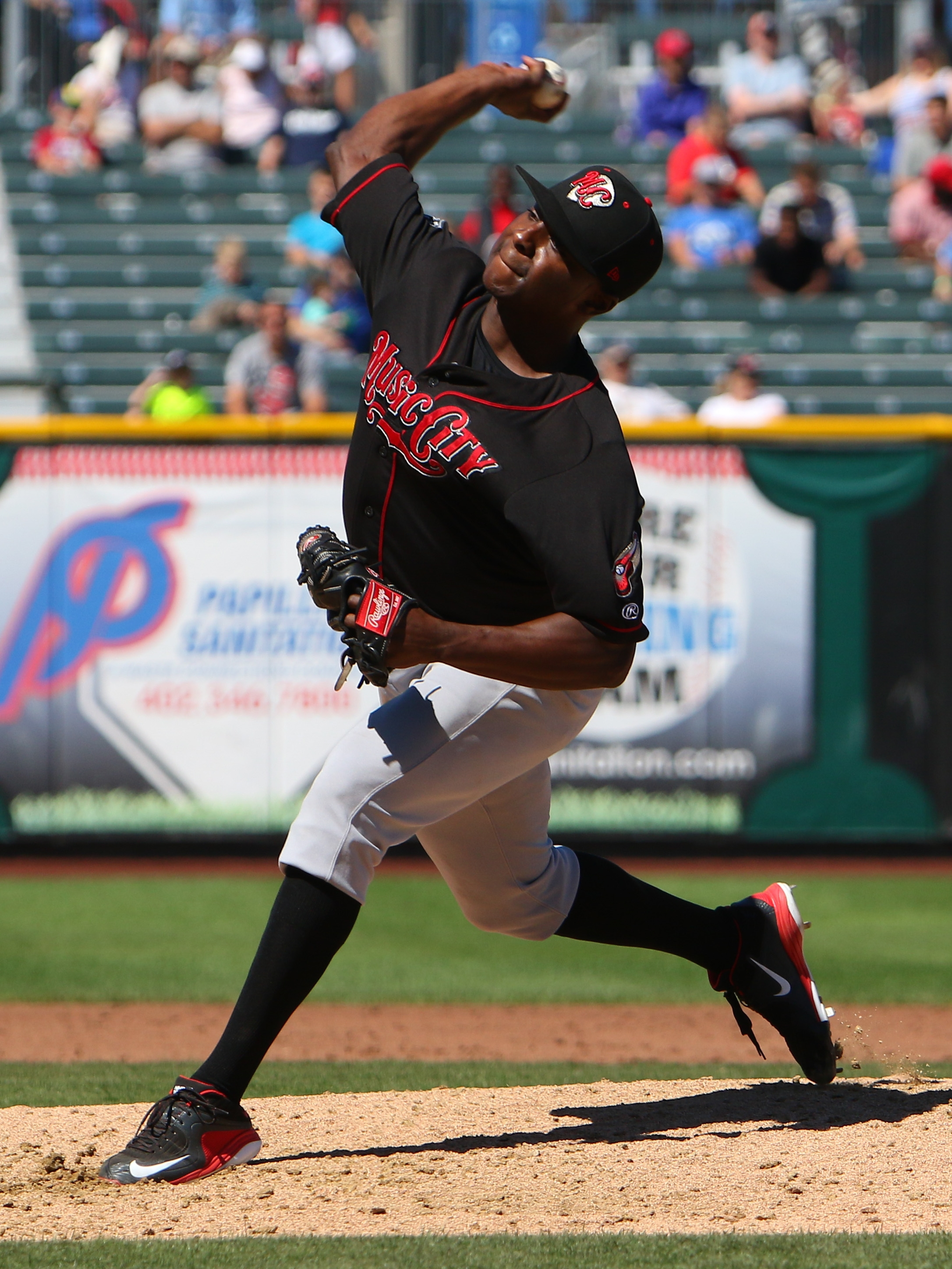
Jharel Cotton, pitcher (2016–2017)

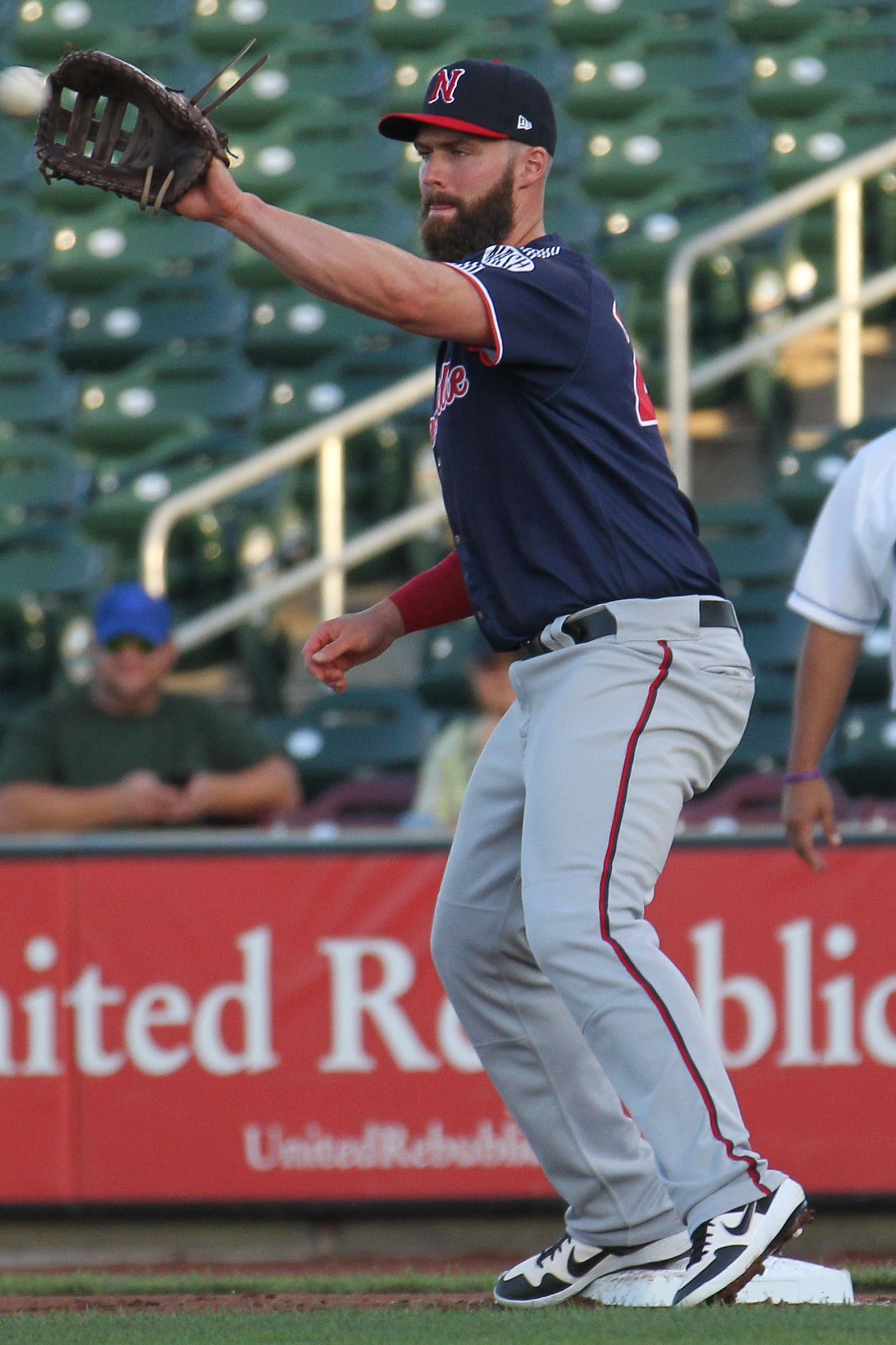
Matt Davidson, first baseman (2019)

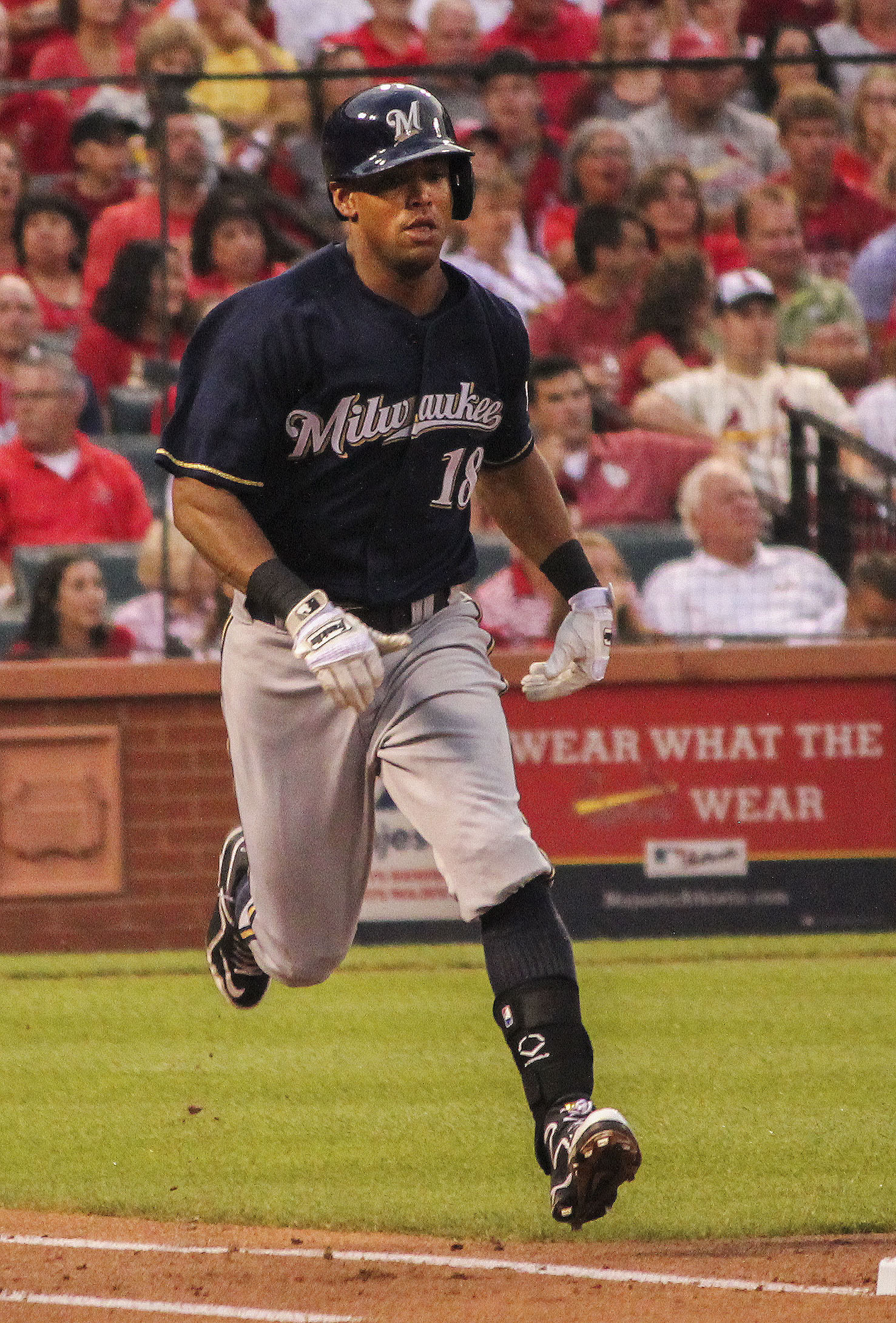
Khris Davis, left fielder (2012–2013)

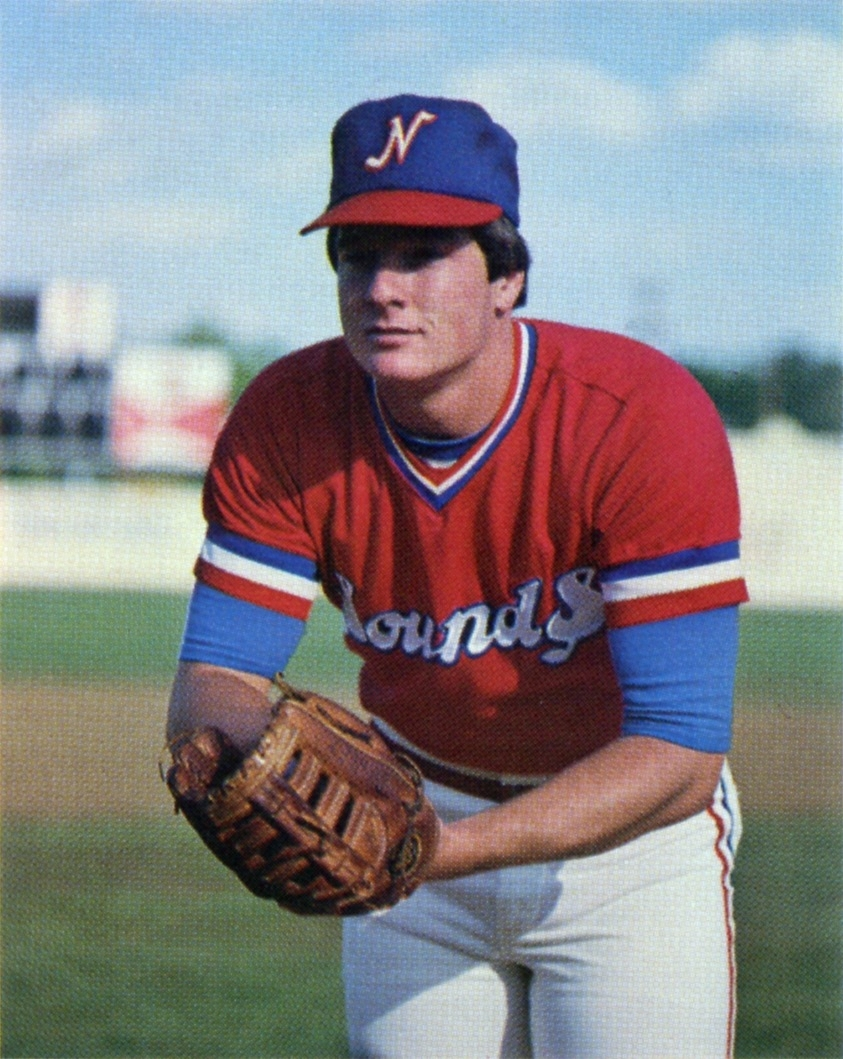
Bill Dawley, pitcher (1978–1979)

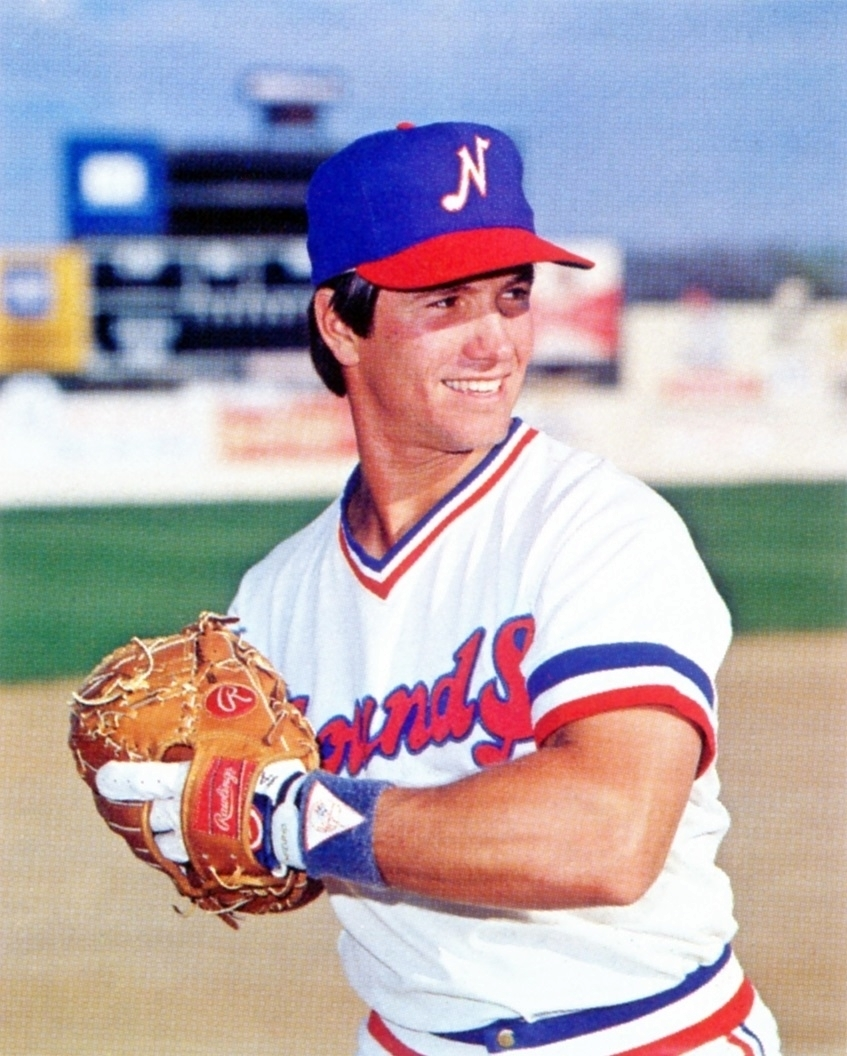
Brian Dayett, outfielder and third baseman (1980–1982)

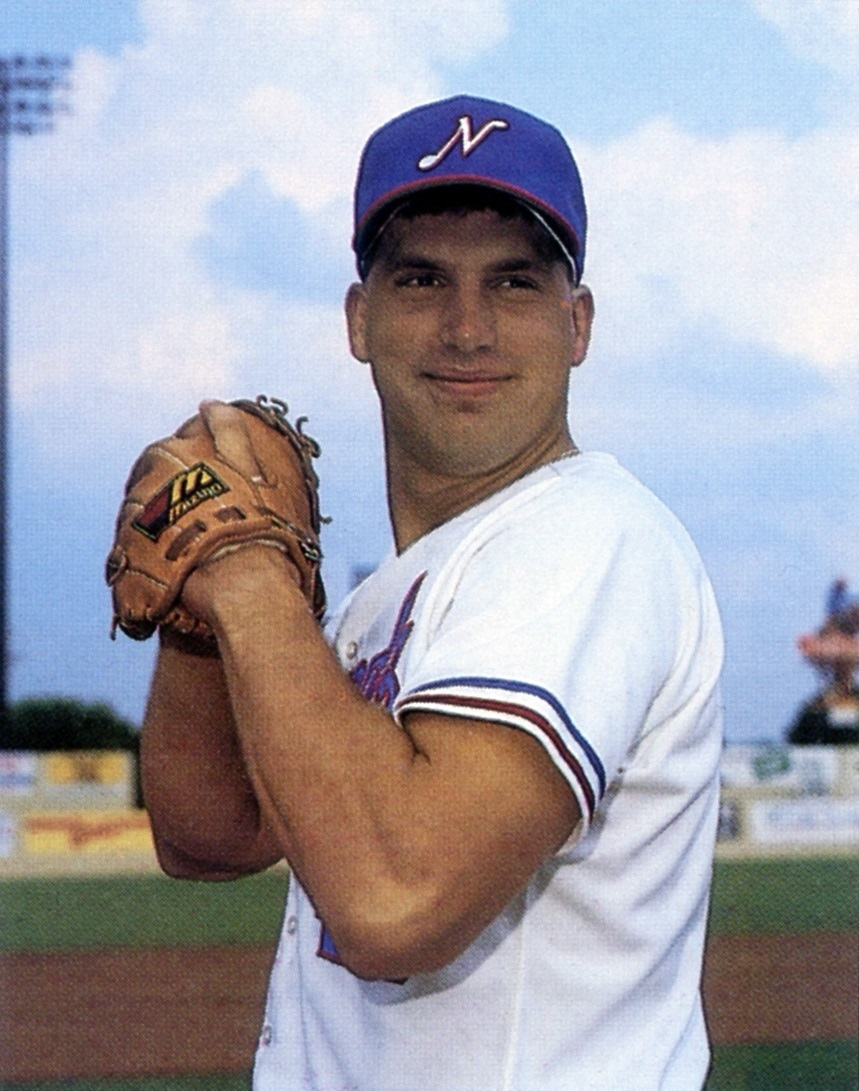
Rob Dibble, pitcher (1987–1988)

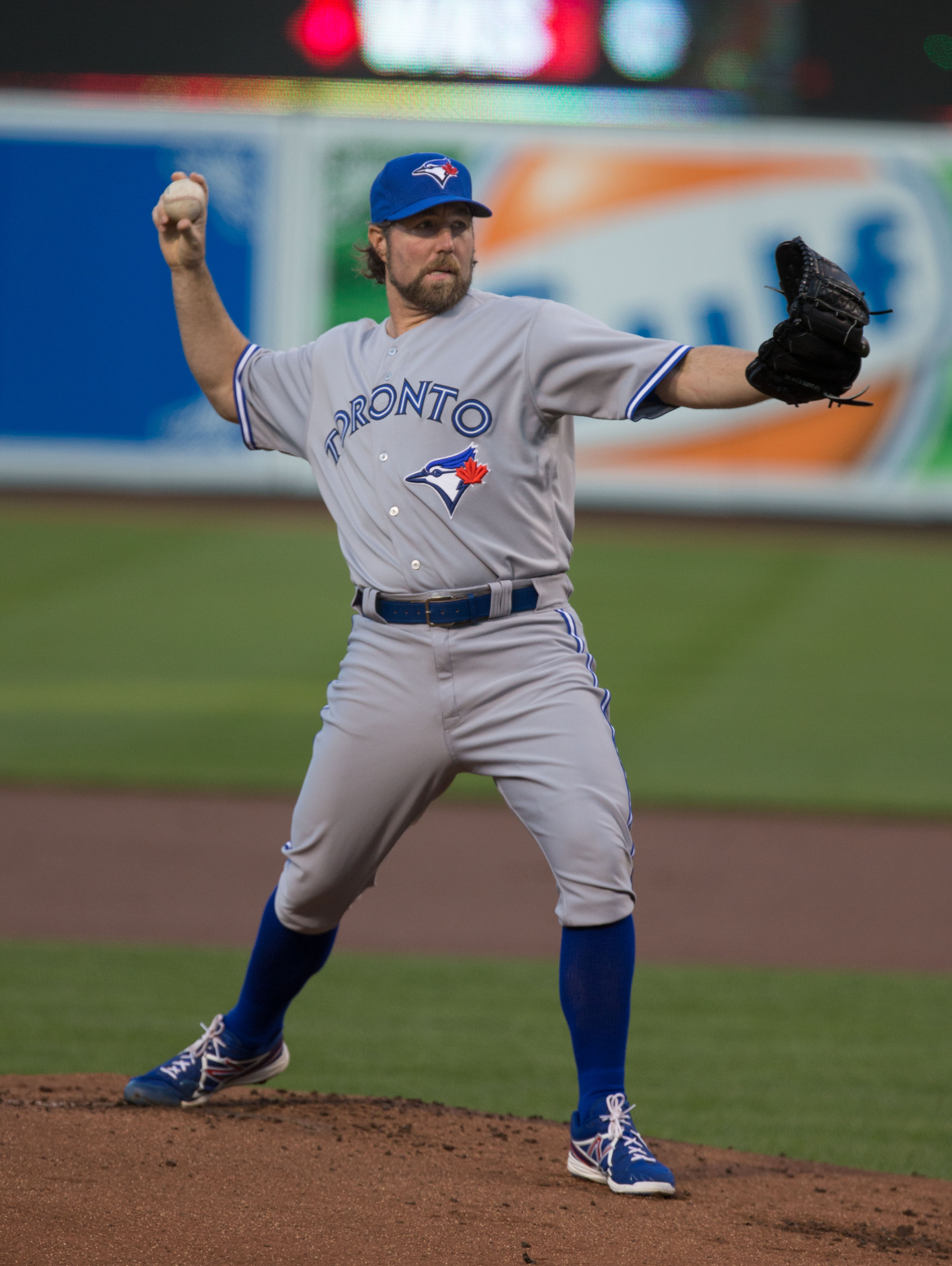
R. A. Dickey, pitcher (2007)

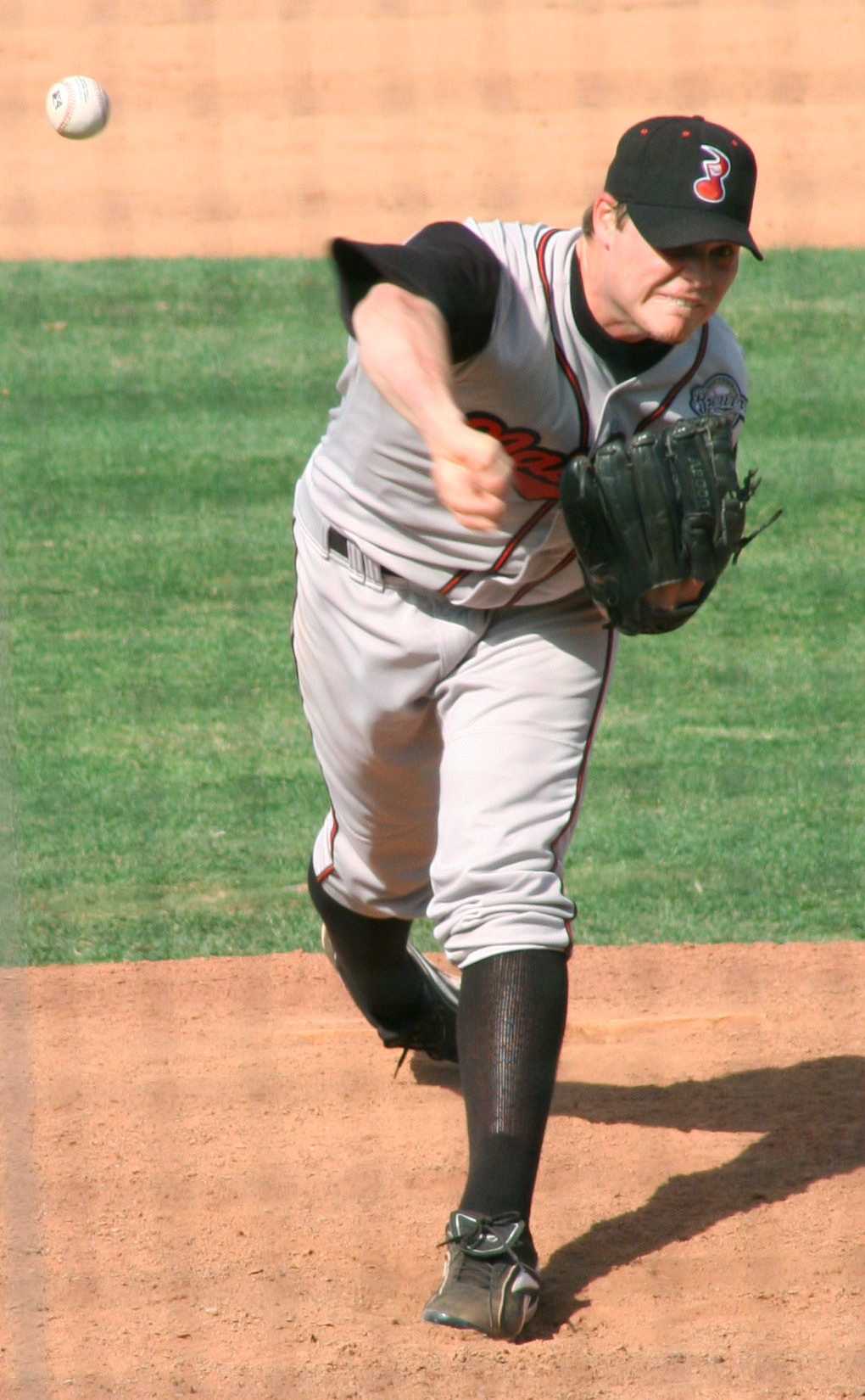
Tim Dillard, pitcher (2007–2014, 2019)

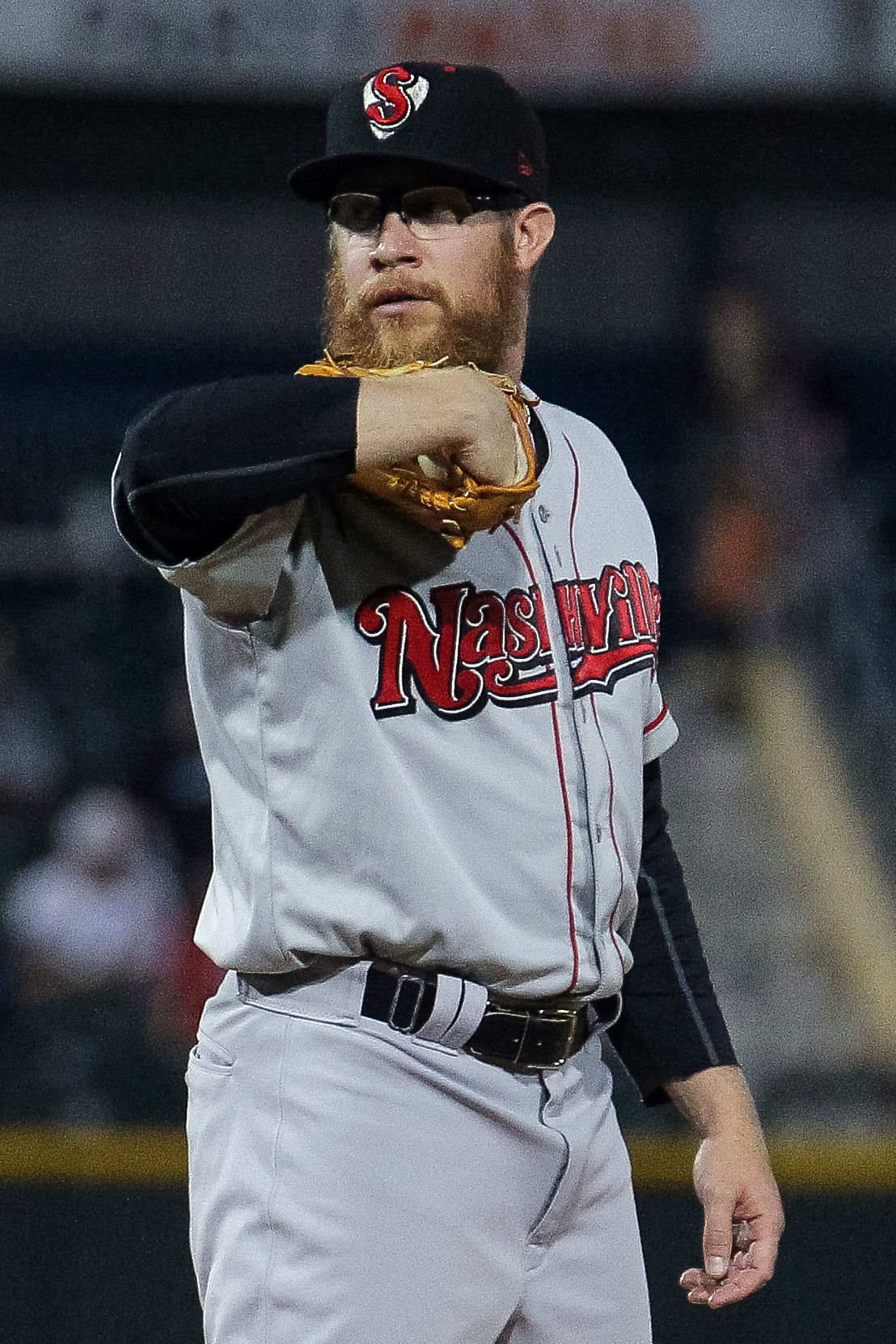
Sean Doolittle, pitcher (2015–2017)

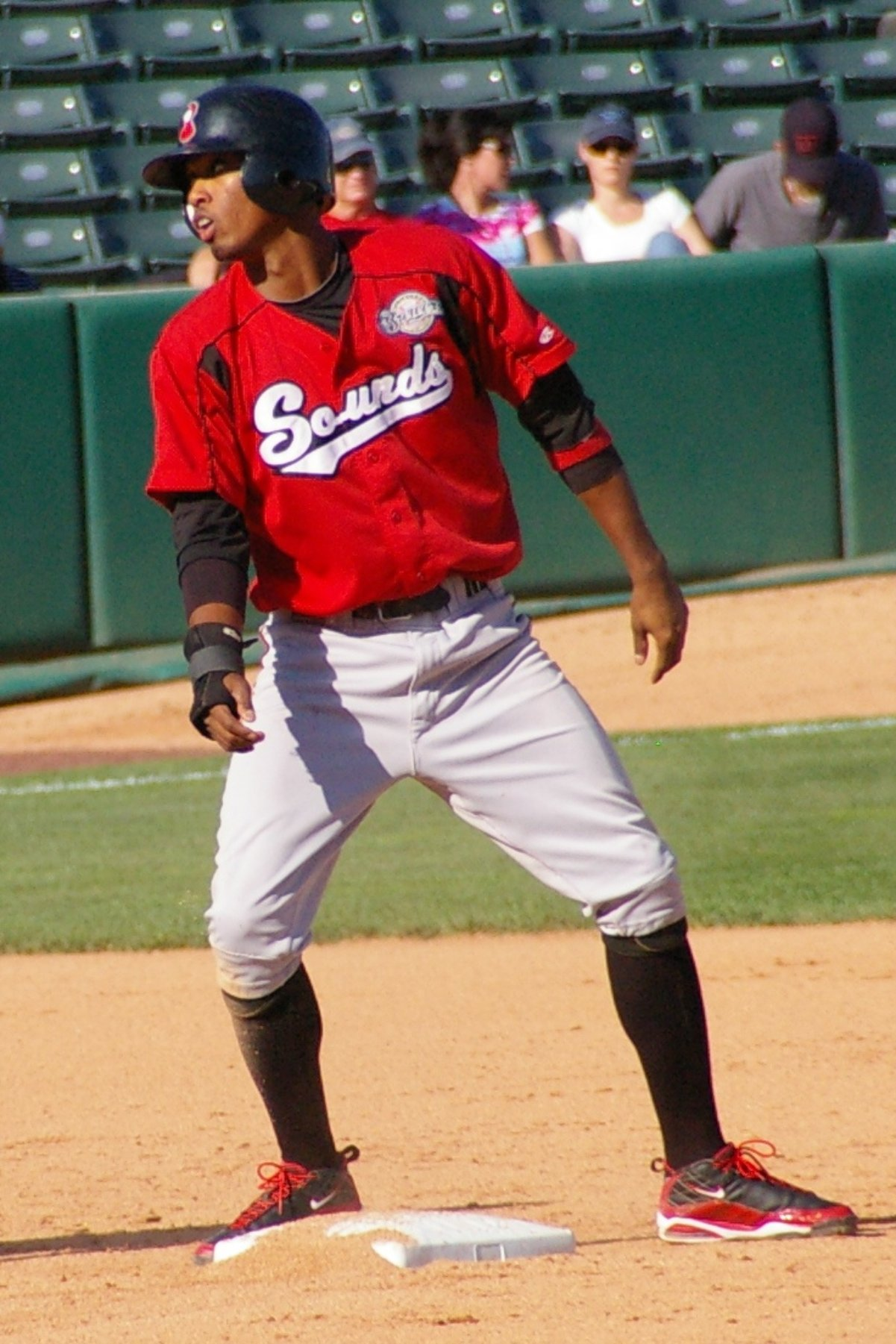
Alcides Escobar, shortstop (2009)

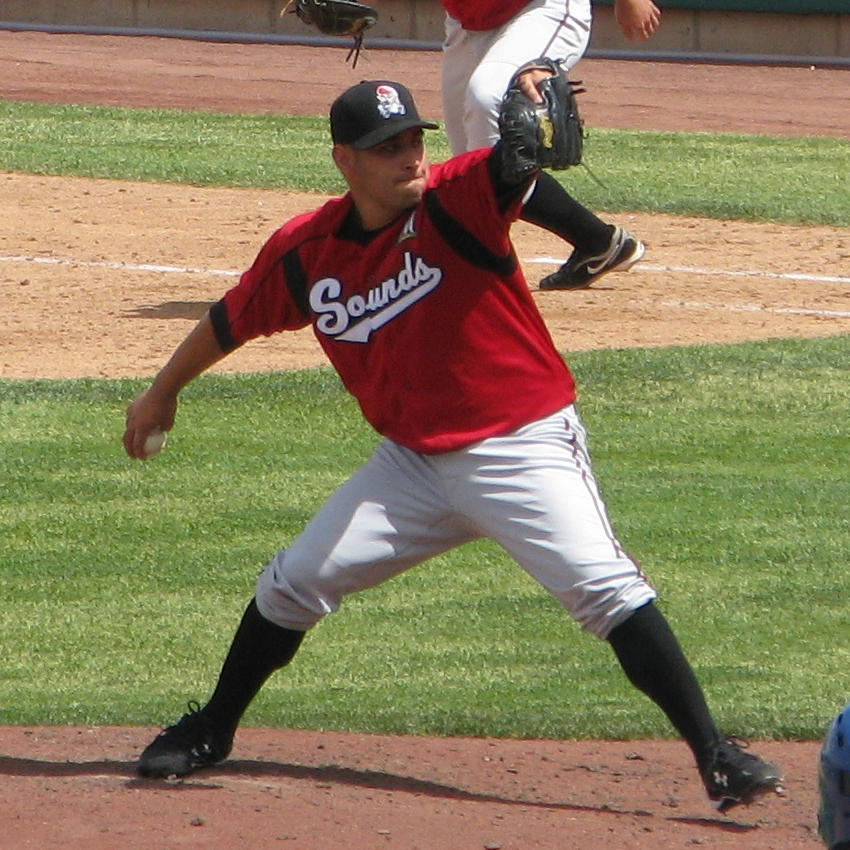
Marco Estrada, pitcher (2010, 2012–2013)

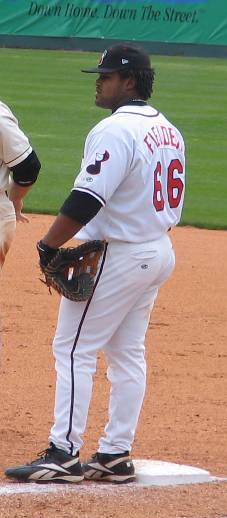
Prince Fielder, first baseman (2005)

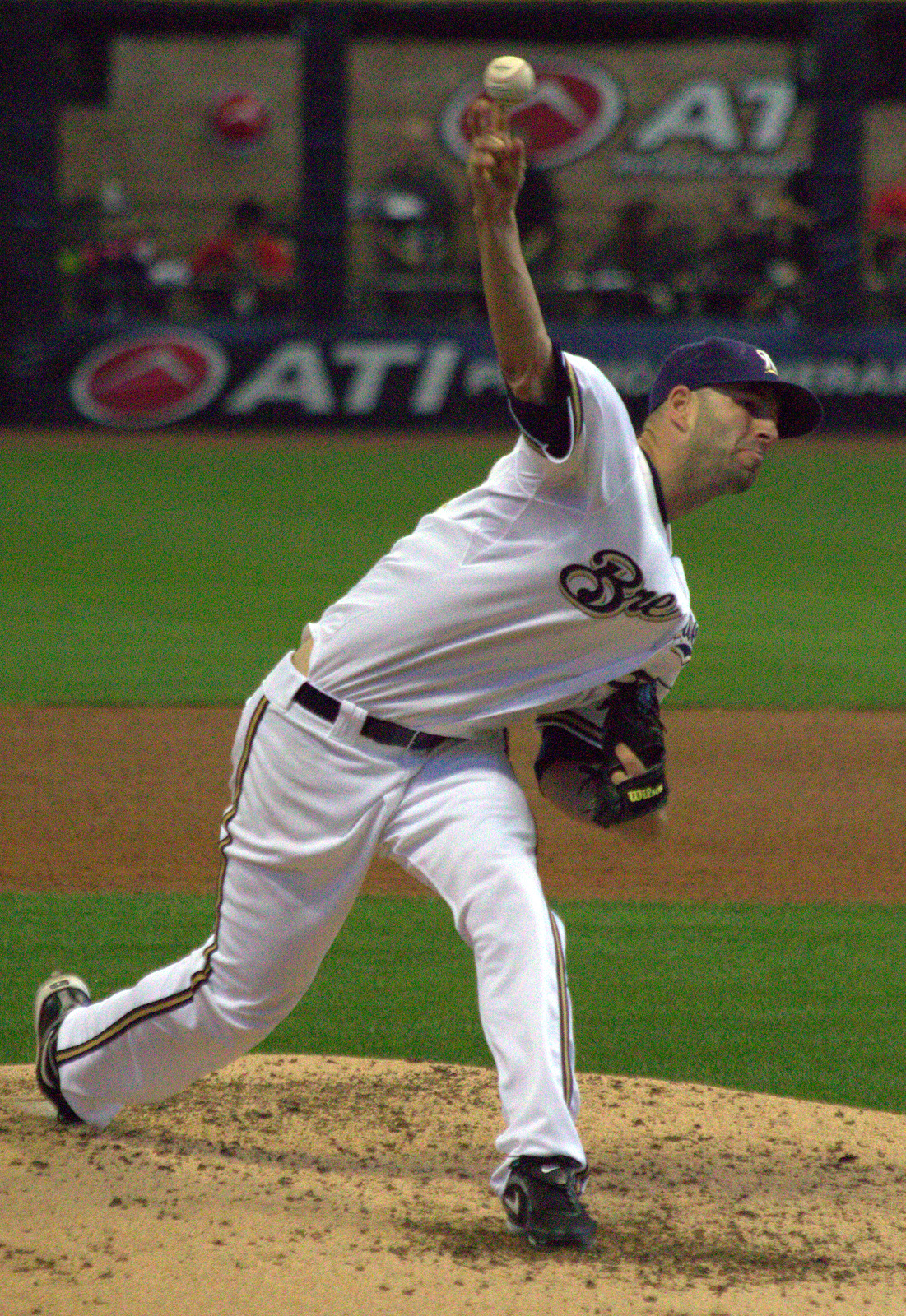
Mike Fiers, pitcher (2011–2014)

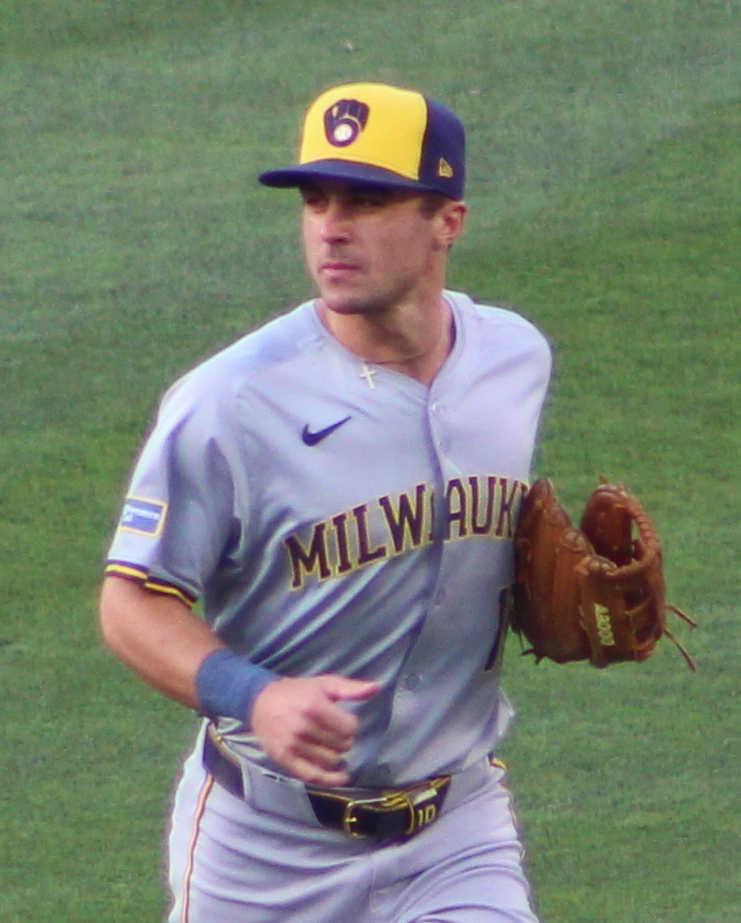
Sal Frelick, center fielder (2022–2023, 2026)

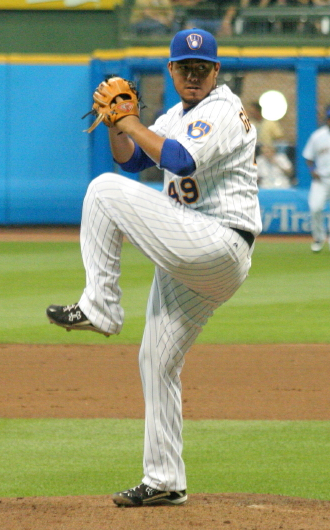
Yovani Gallardo, pitcher (2007–2008)

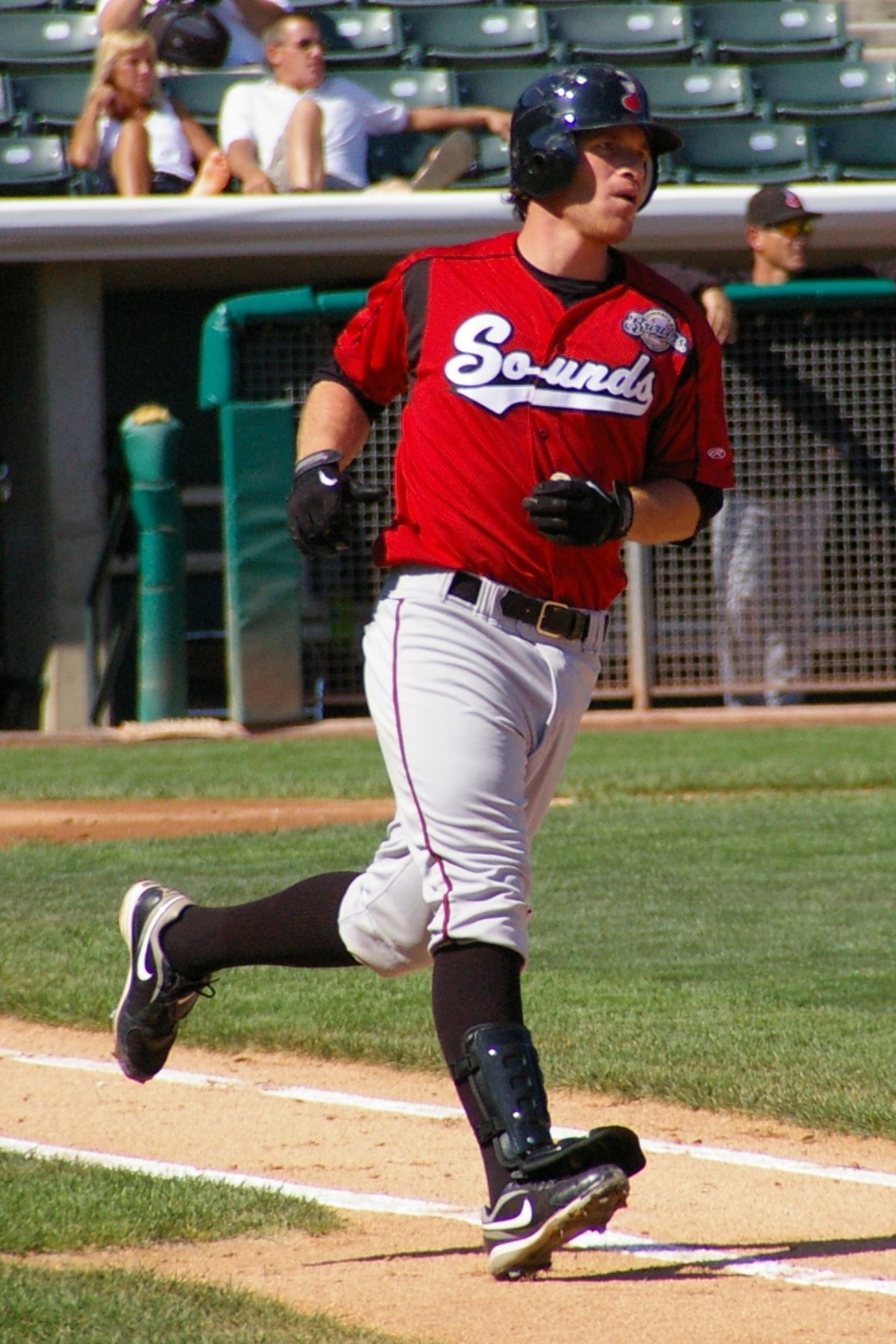
Mat Gamel, third and first baseman (2008–2011)

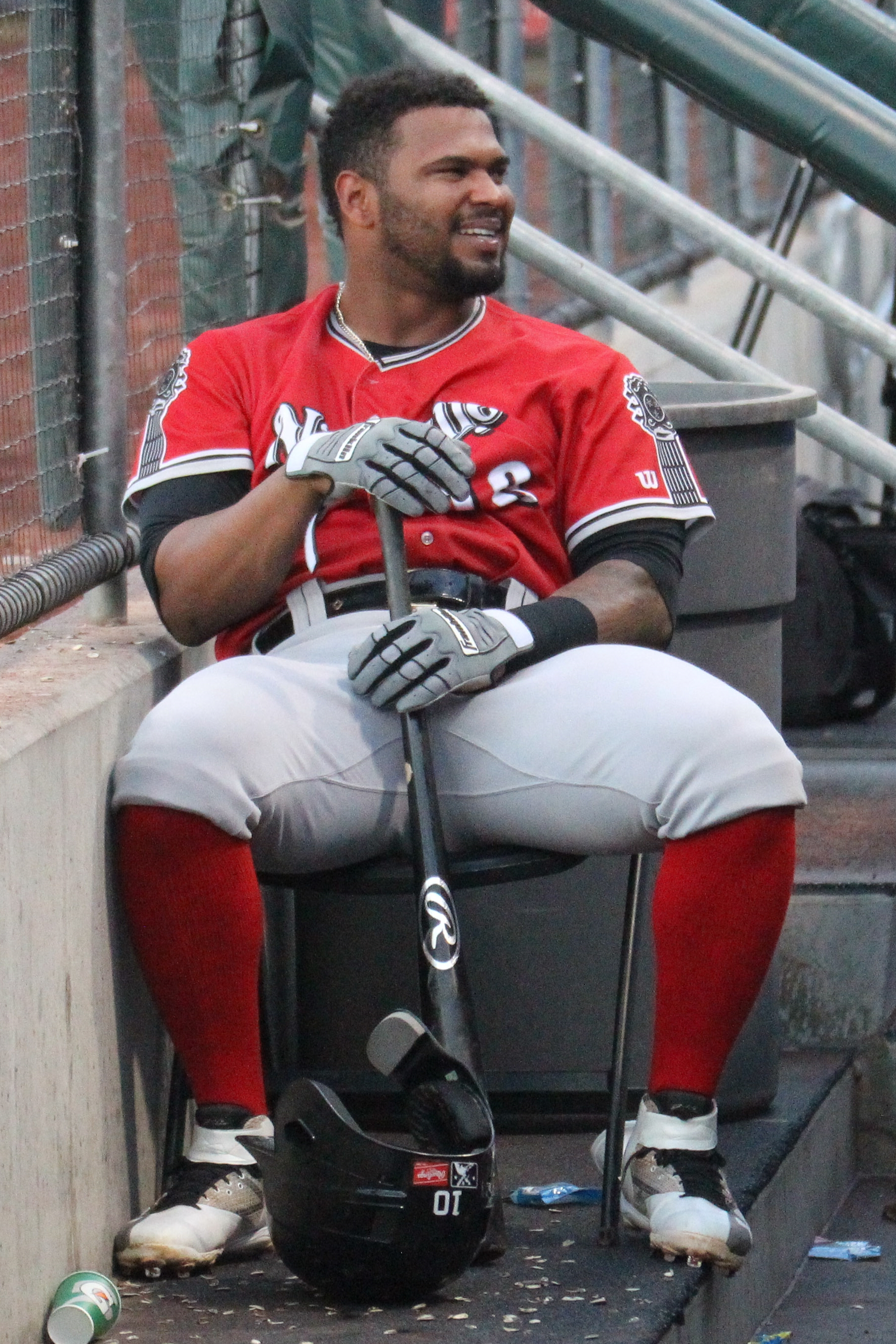
Anthony García, outfielder and designated hitter (2018)

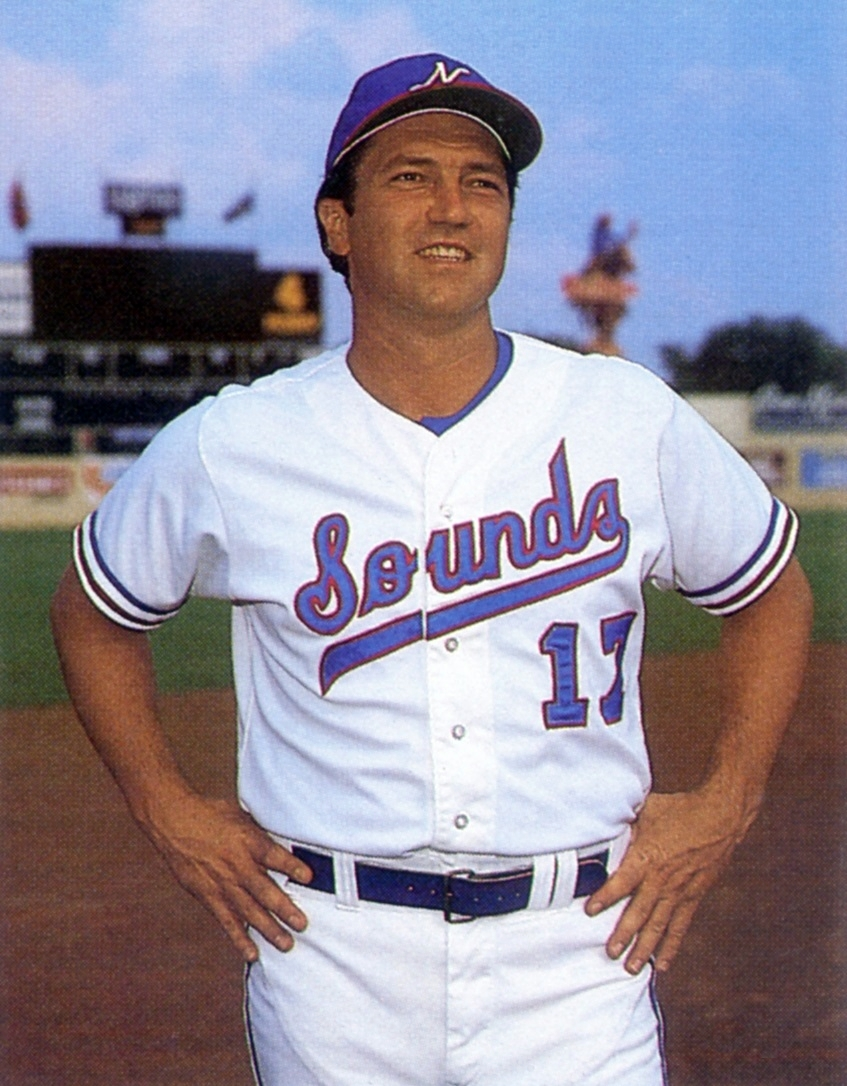
Wayne Garland, pitcher (1982)

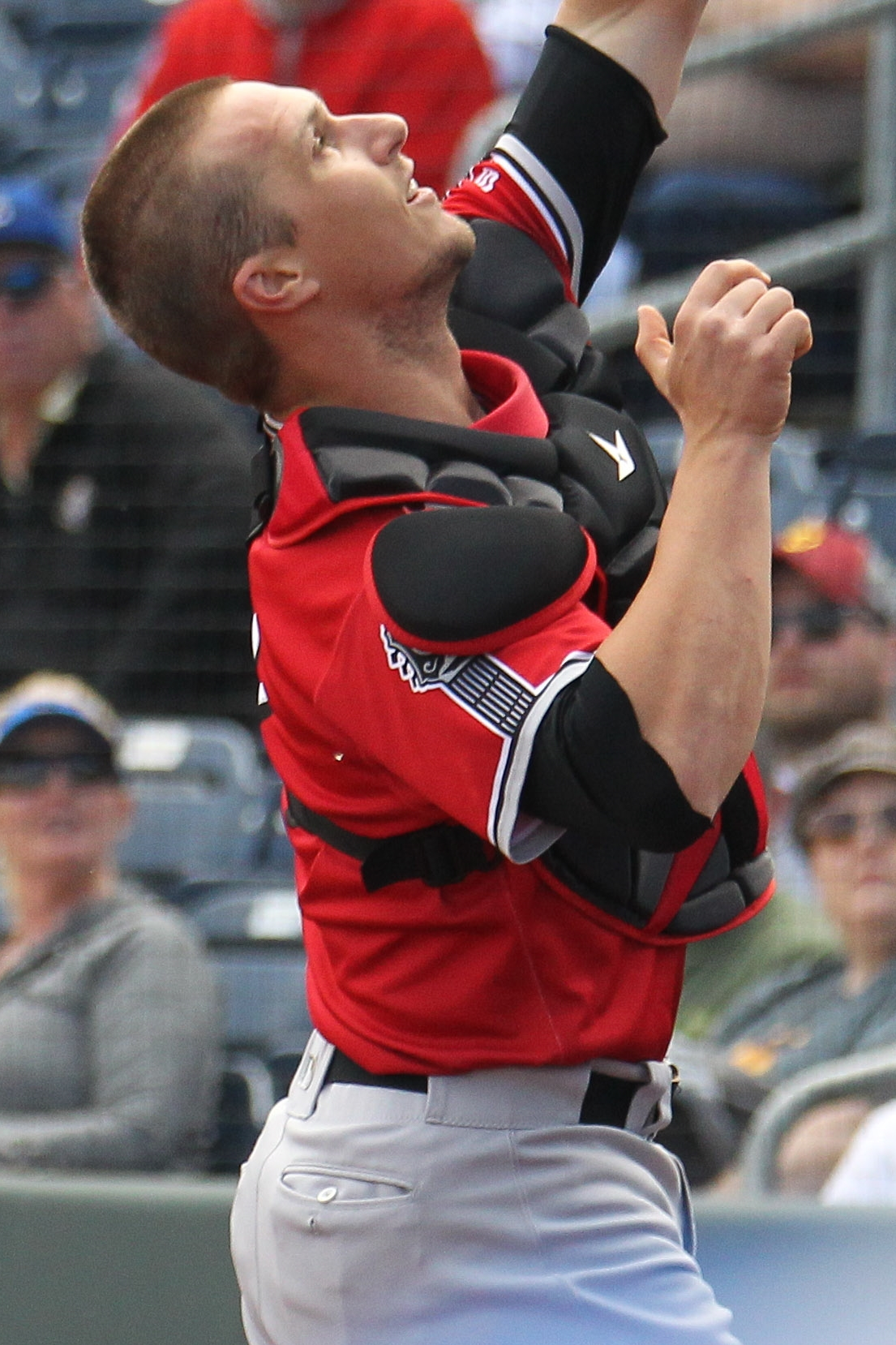
Dustin Garneau, catcher (2018)

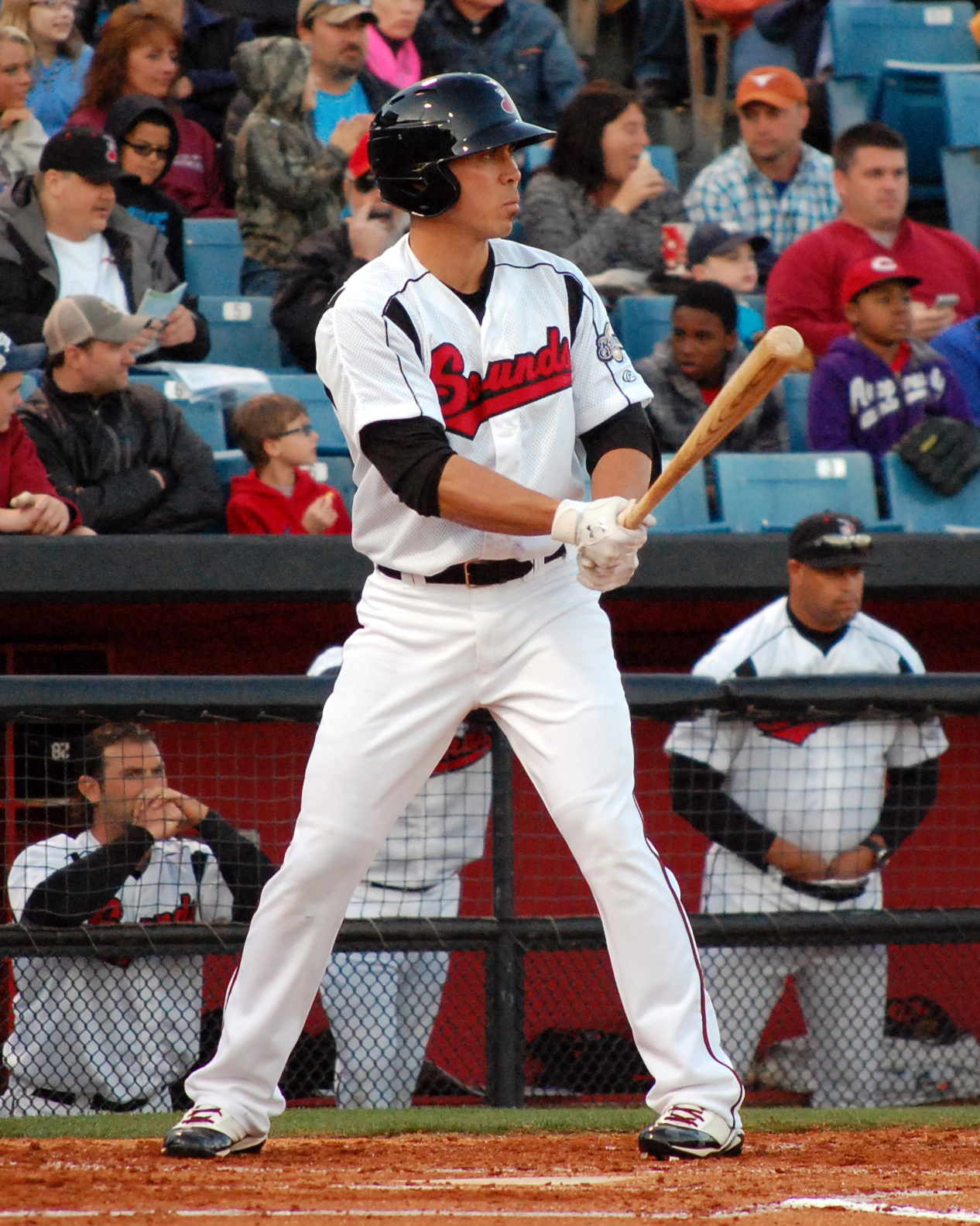
Cole Garner, right fielder (2013)

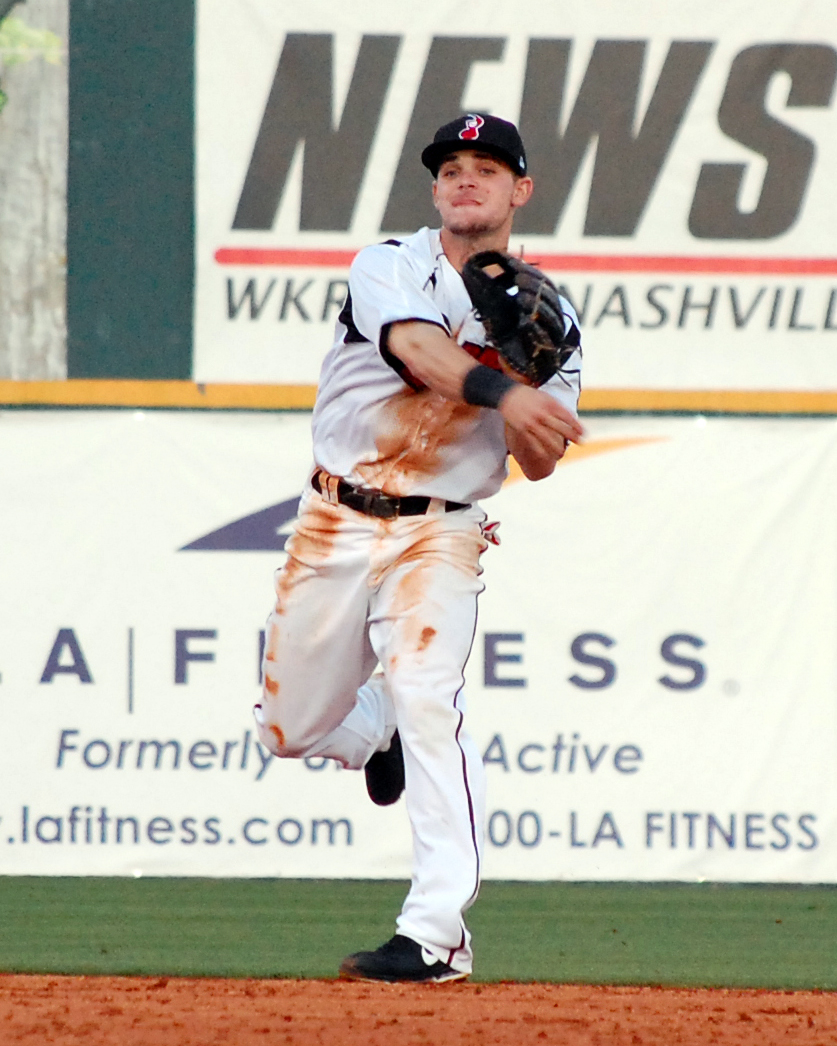
Scooter Gennett, second baseman (2013)

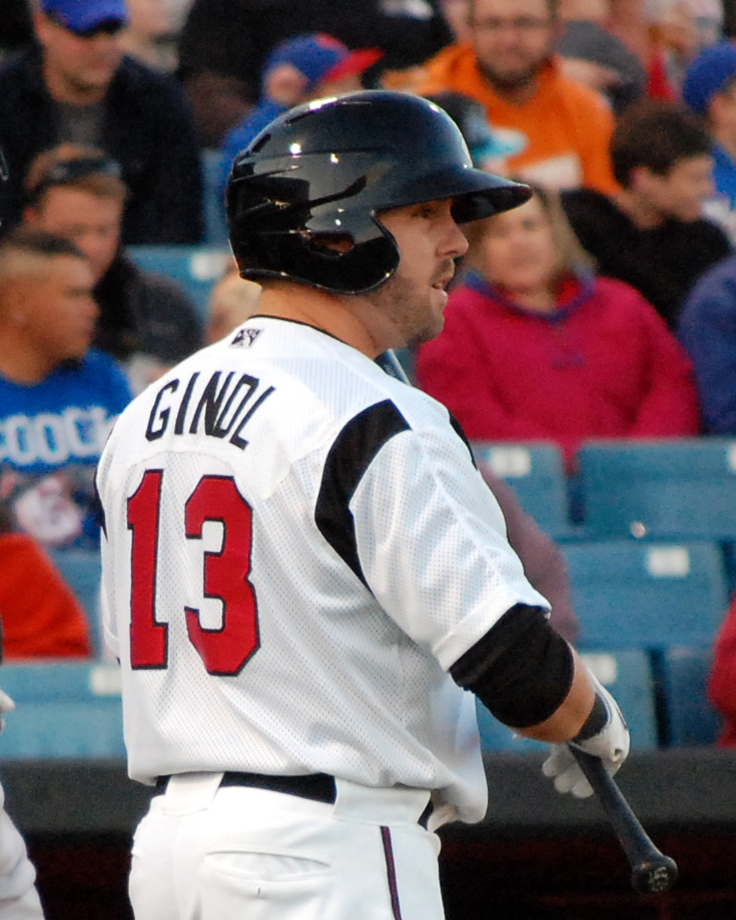
Caleb Gindl, right fielder and center fielder (2011–2014)

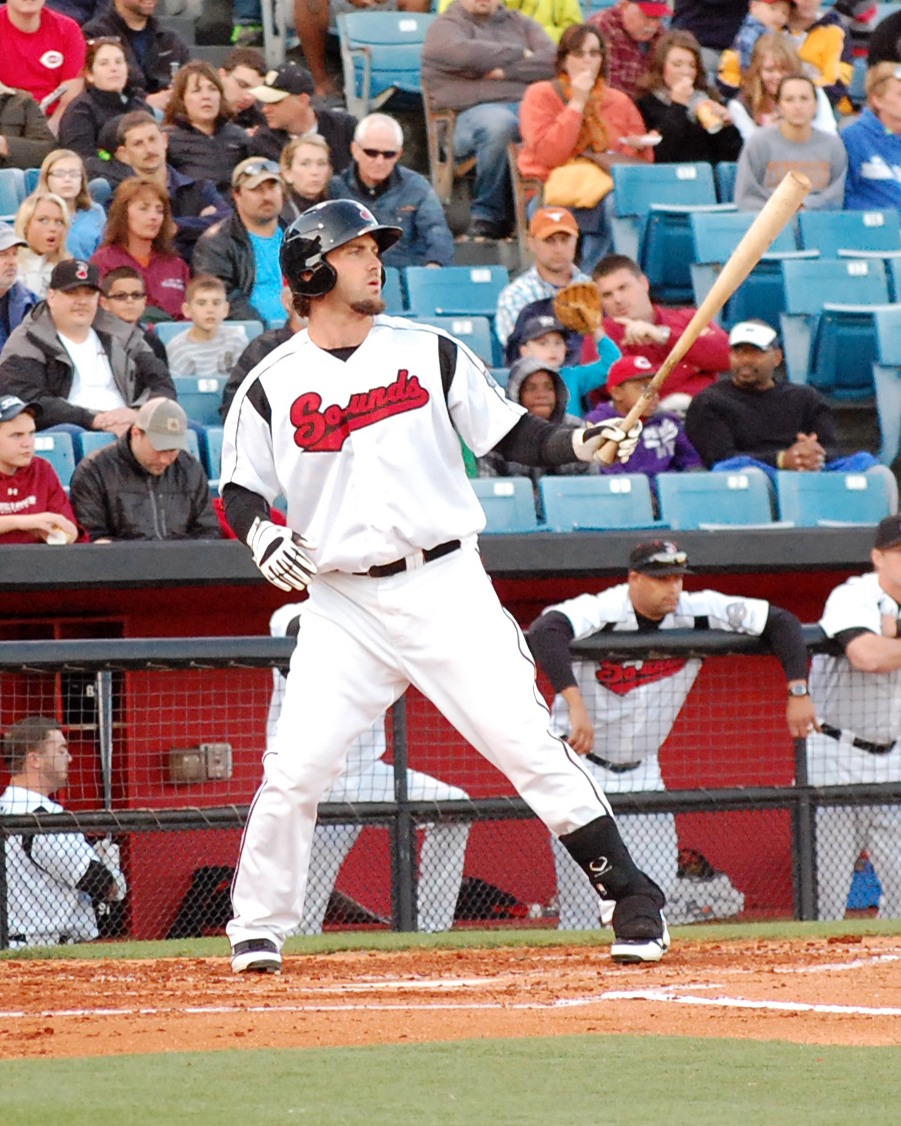
Sean Halton, outfielder and first baseman (2012–2014)

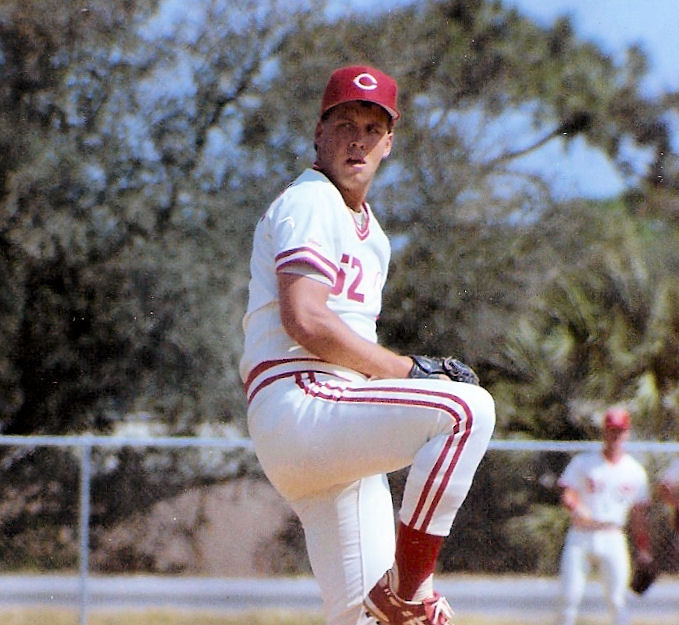
Chris Hammond, pitcher (1989–1990)

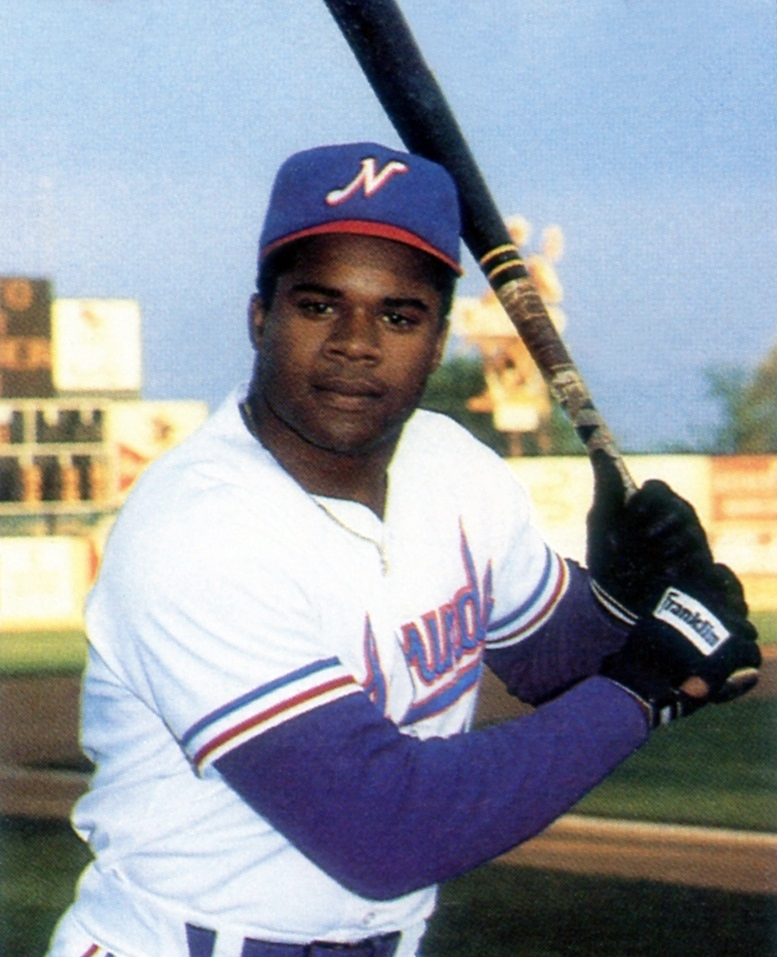
Lenny Harris, second baseman and shortstop (1987–1989)

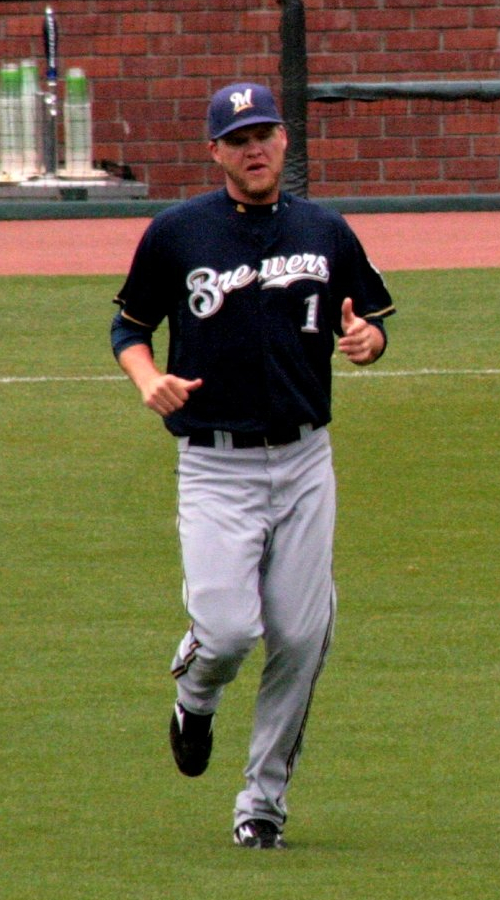
Corey Hart, right fielder and left fielder (2005–2006, 2009, 2011)

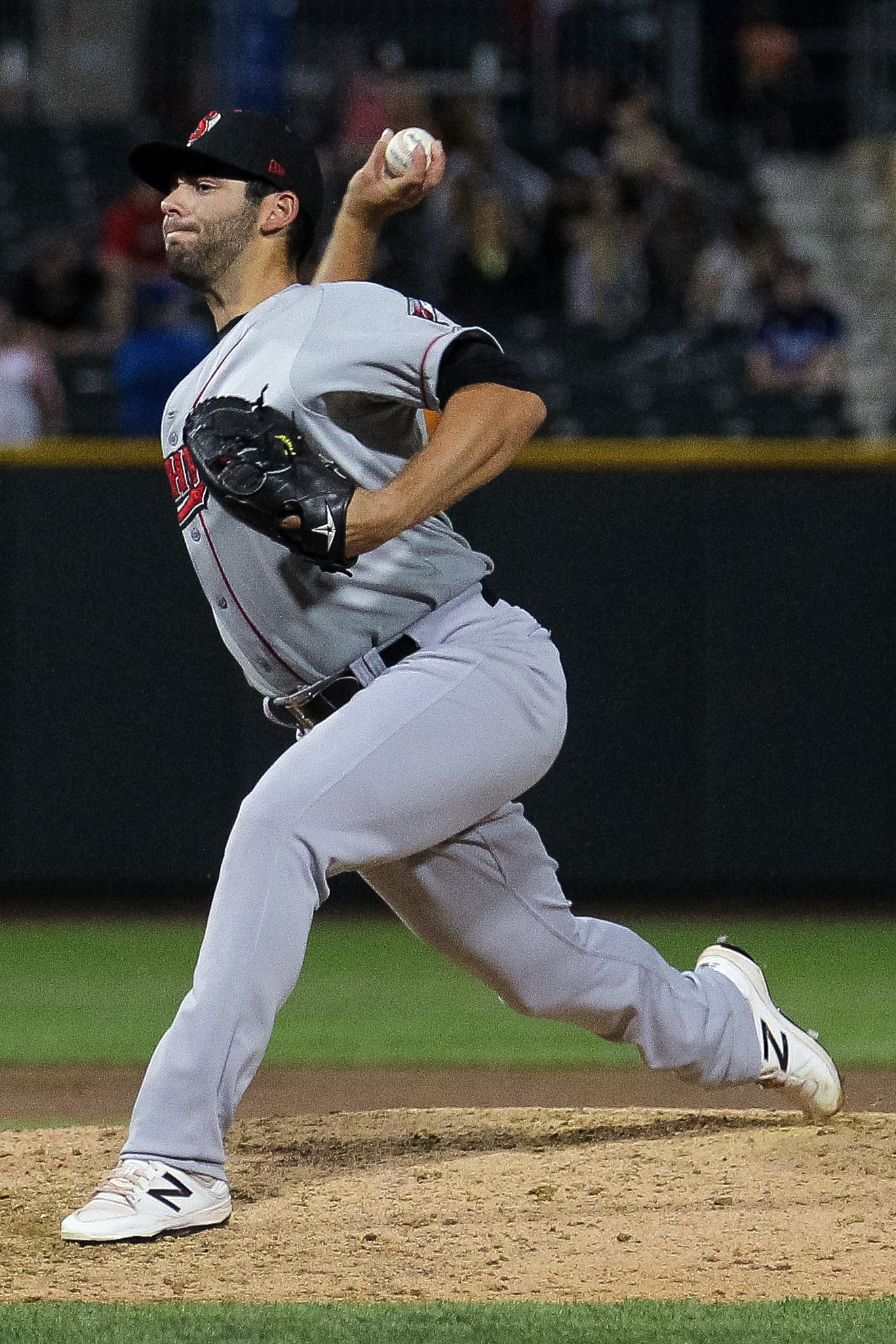
Tucker Healy, pitcher (2016–2017)

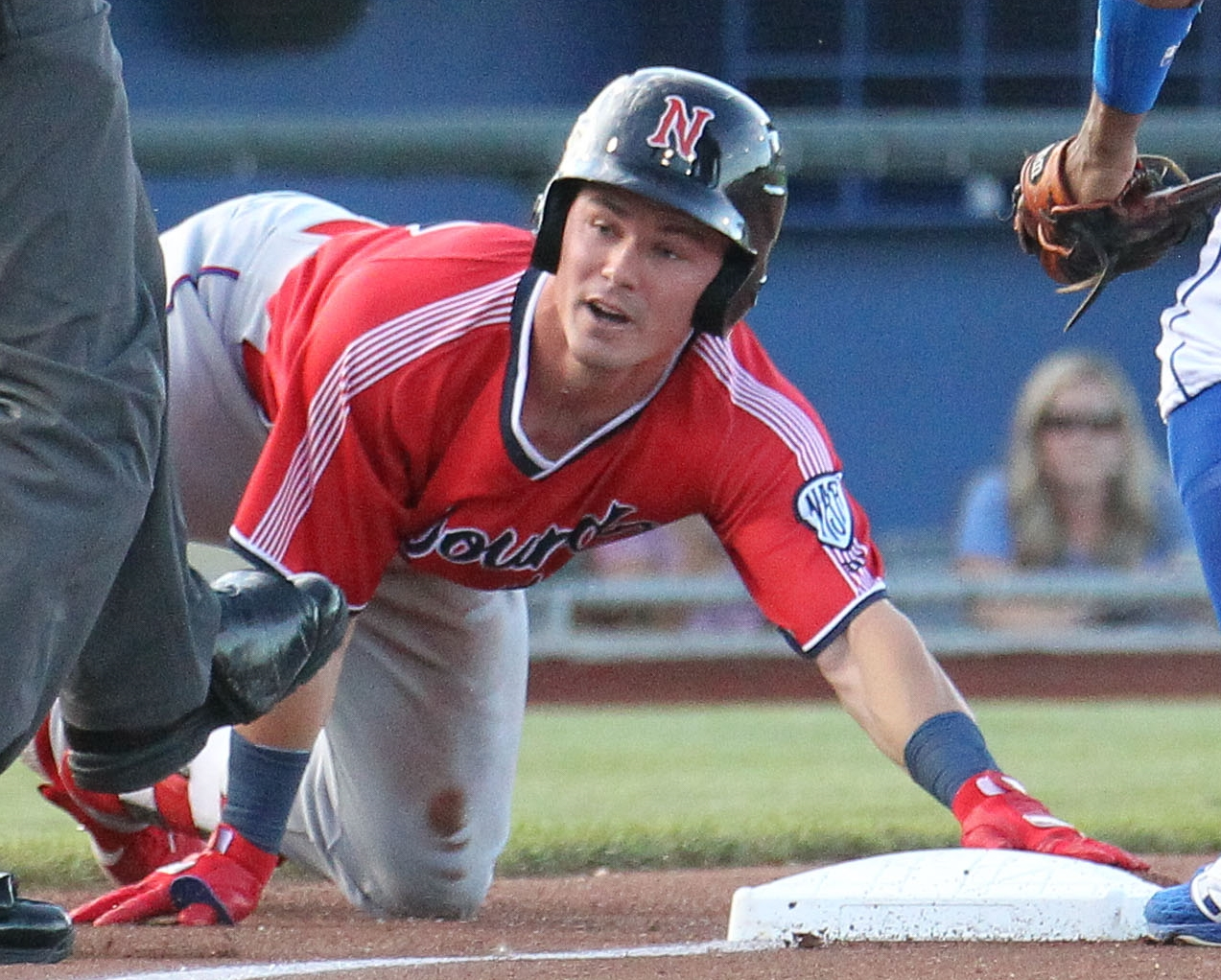
Scott Heineman, right fielder (2019)

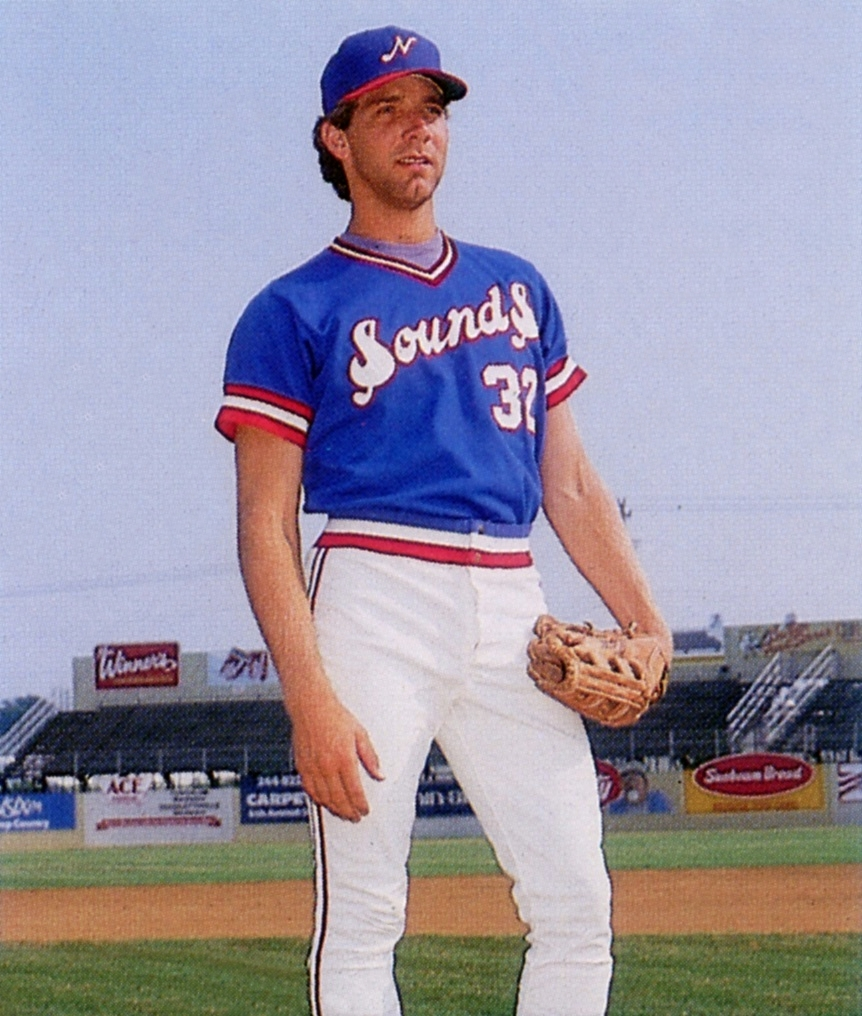
Mike Henneman, pitcher (1986)

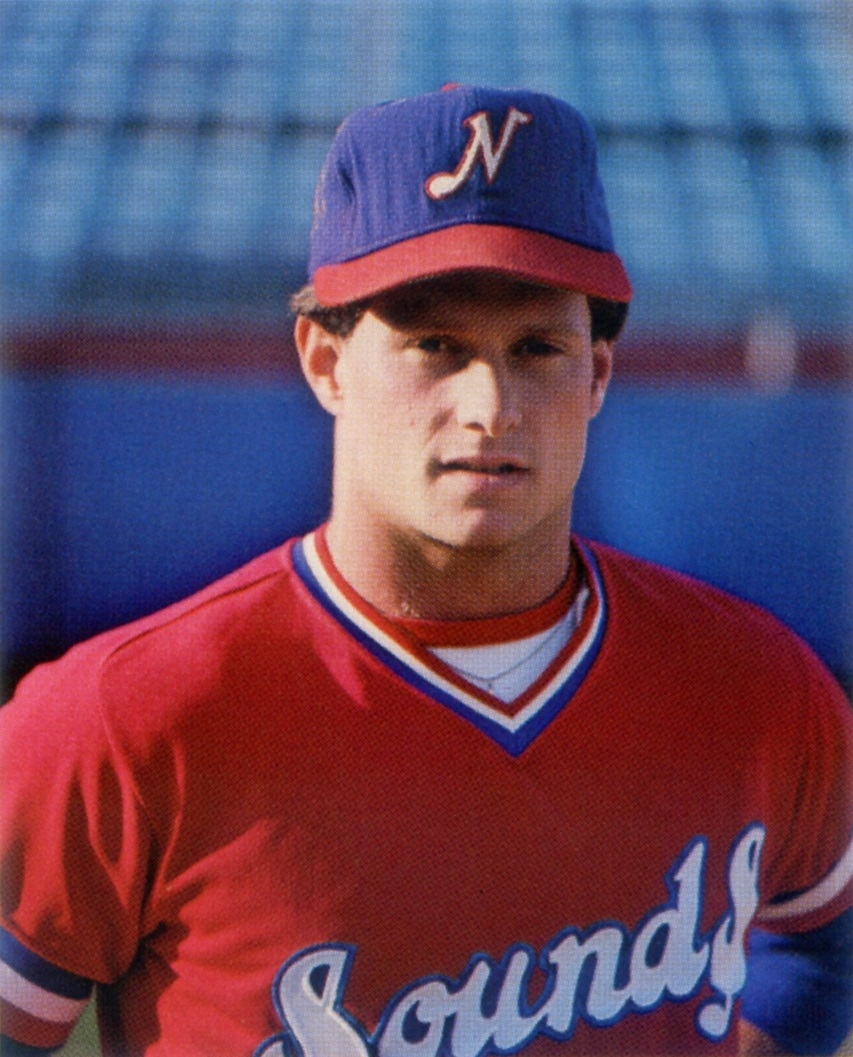
Paul Householder, outfielder (1979)

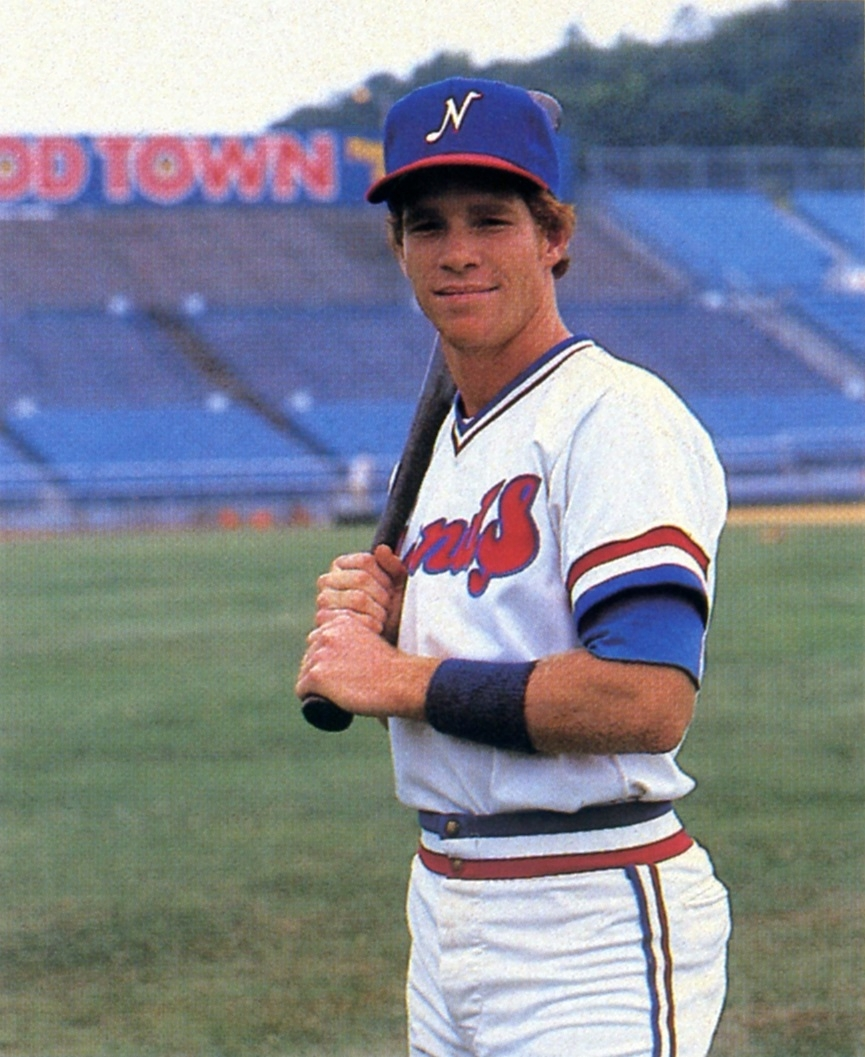
Rex Hudler, second baseman (1982)

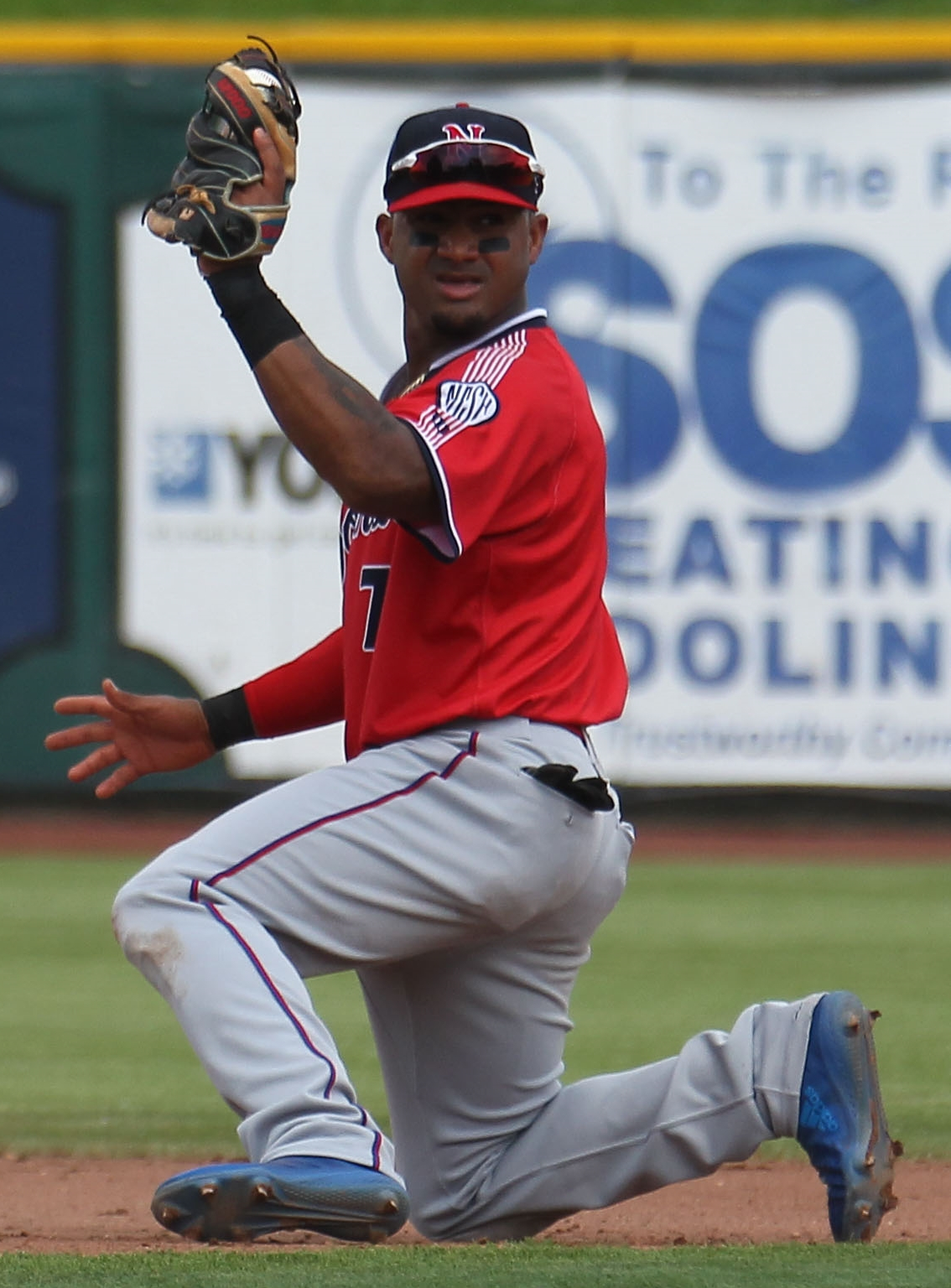
Andy Ibáñez, third baseman (2019)

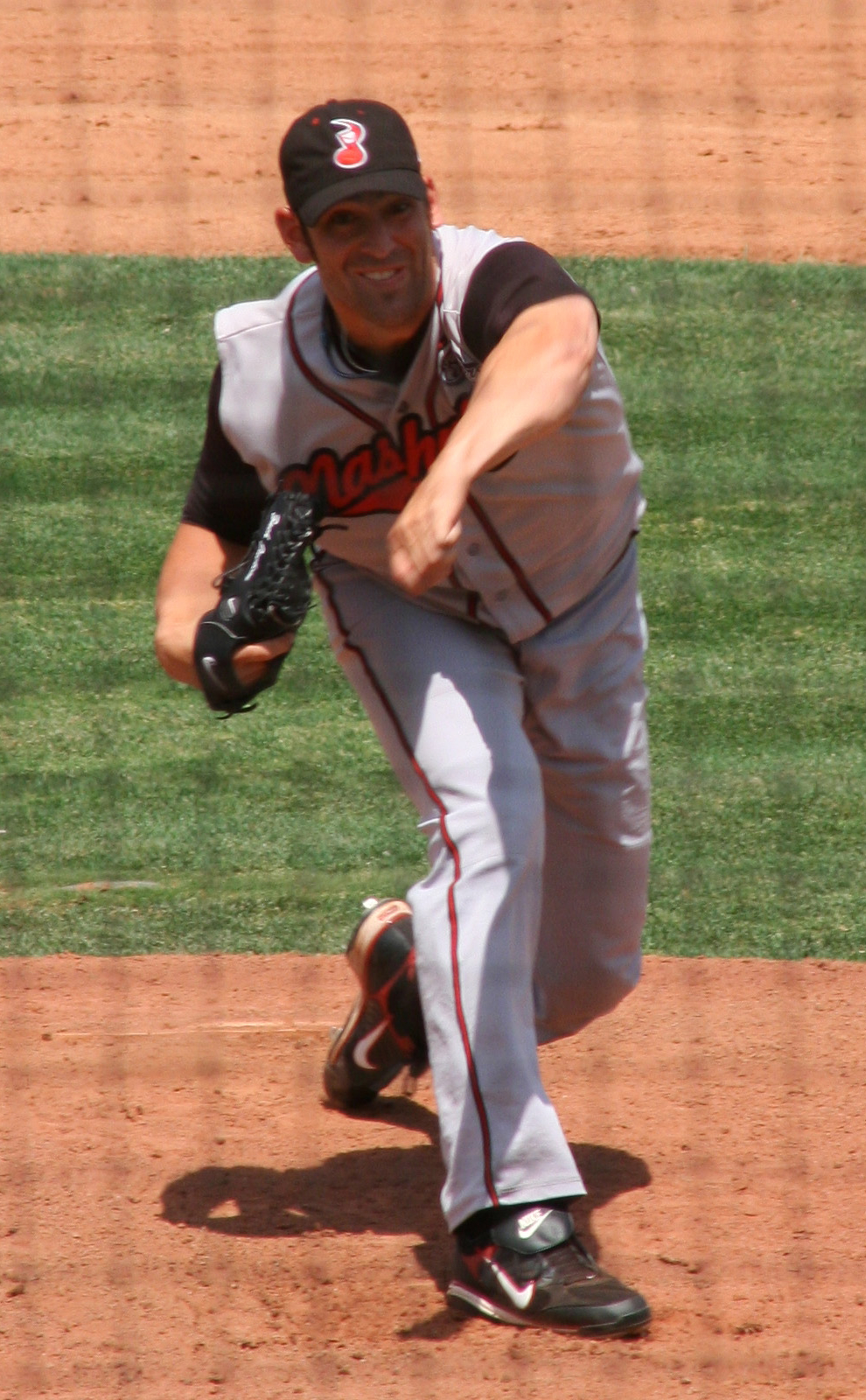
Zach Jackson, pitcher (2006–2008)

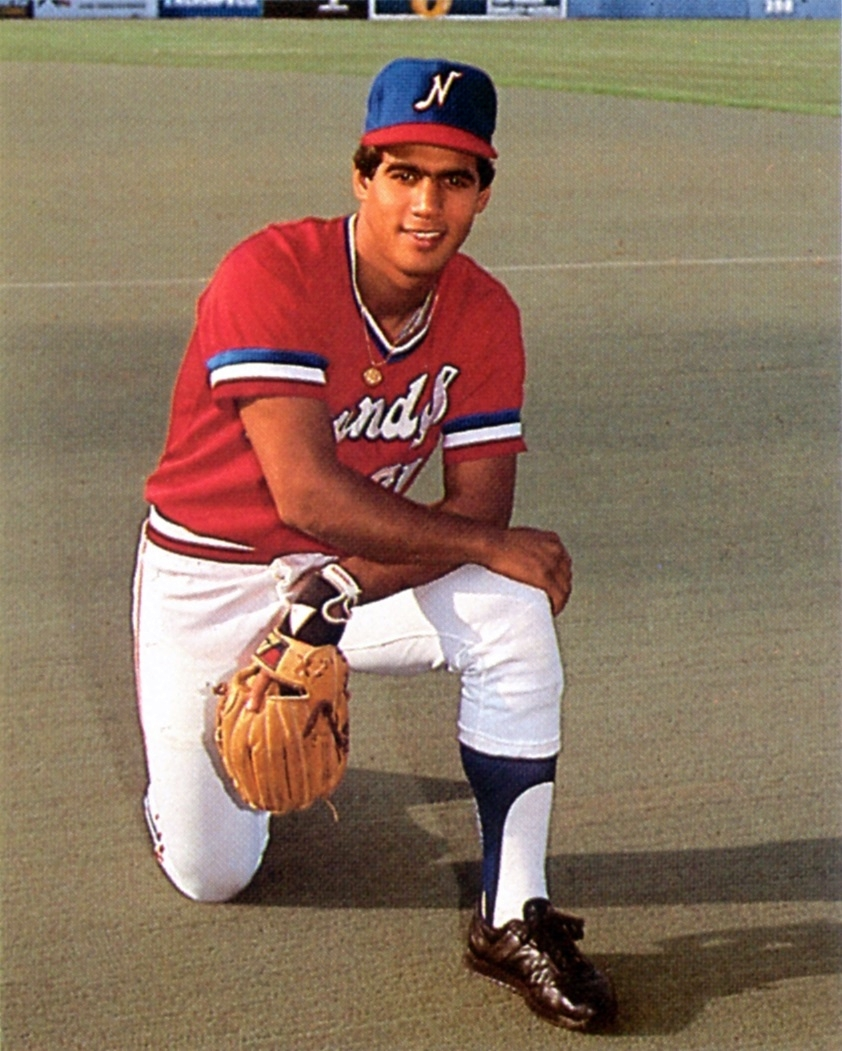
Stan Javier, outfielder (1984)

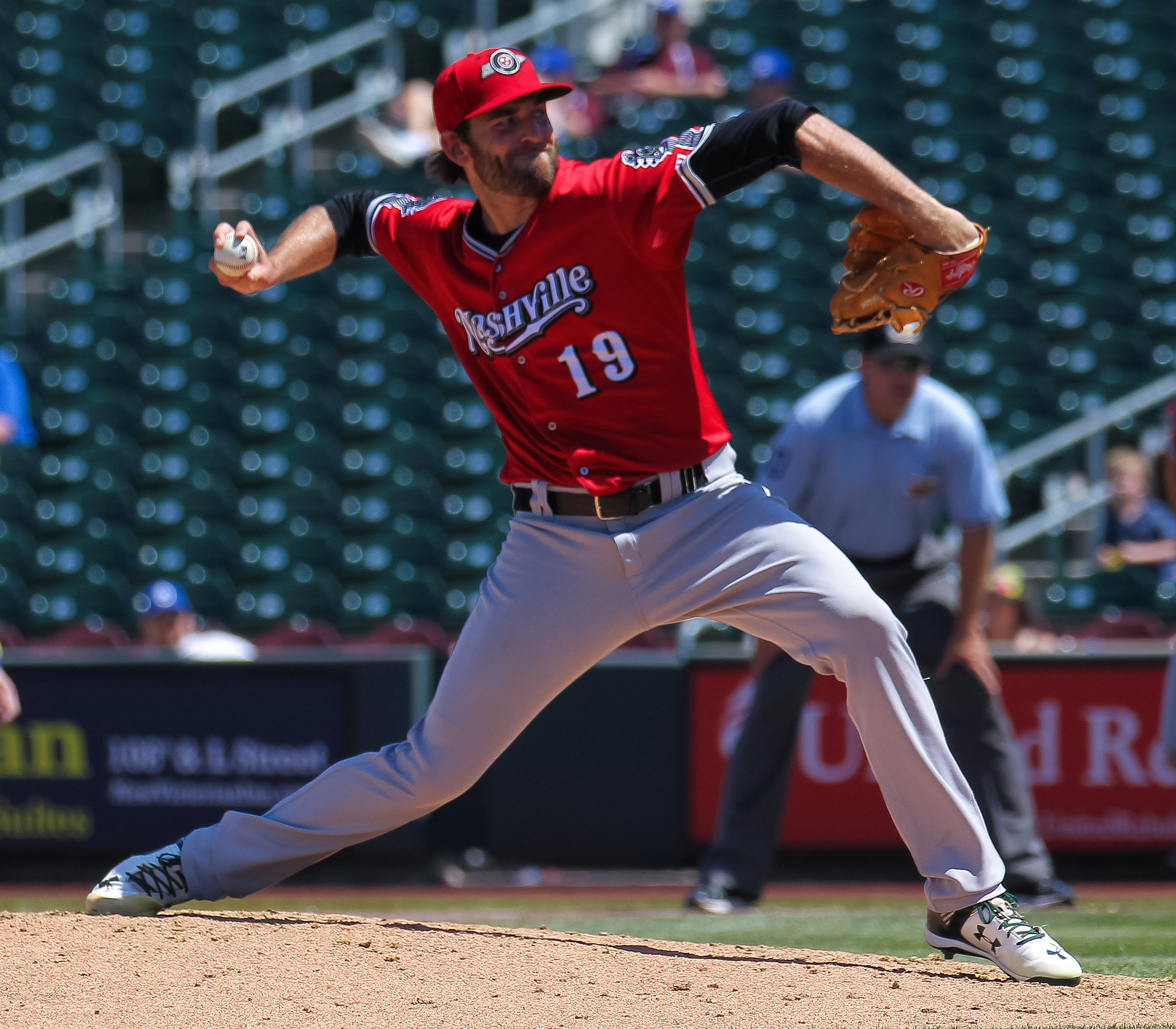
Chris Jensen, pitcher (2016–2017)

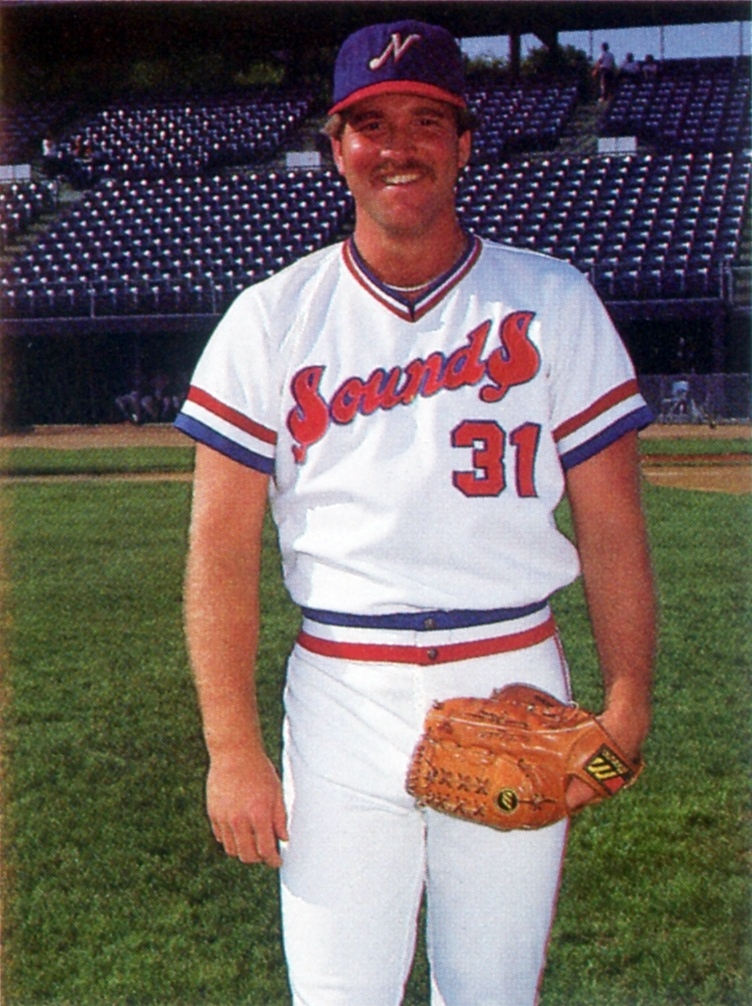
Bryan Kelly, pitcher (1985–1986)

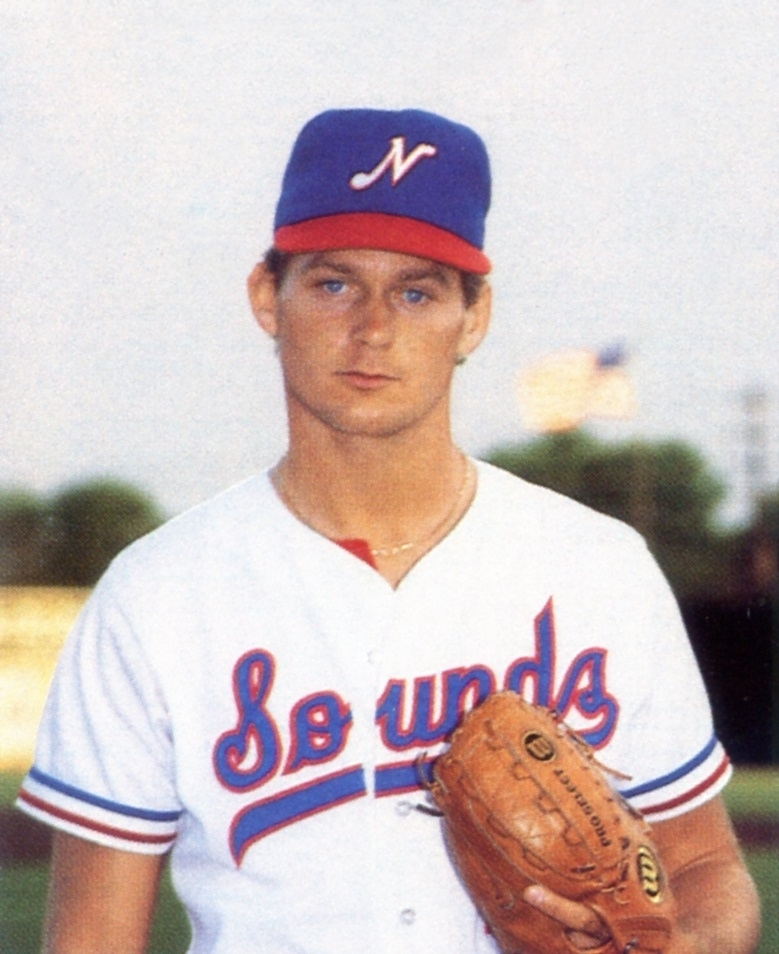
Hugh Kemp, pitcher (1987–1989)

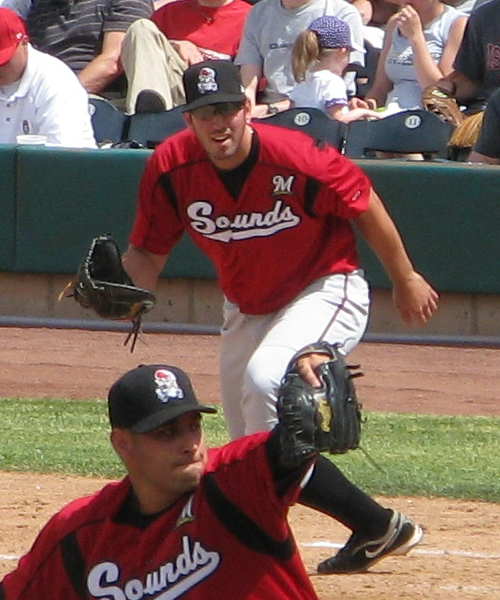
Joe Koshansky, first baseman (2009–2010)

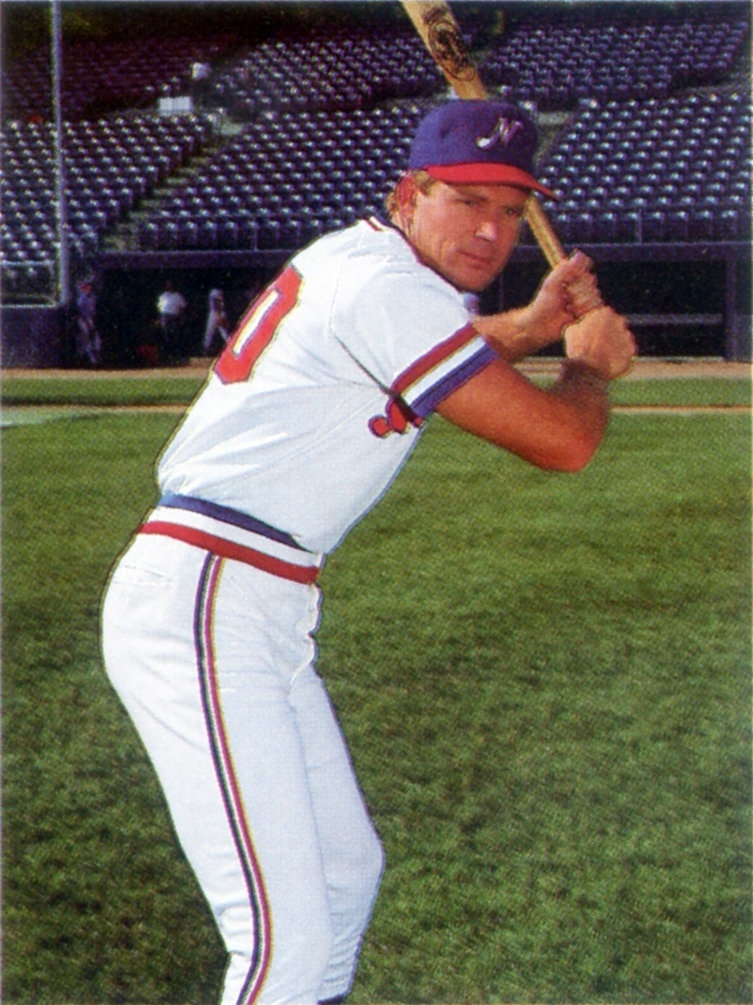
Rusty Kuntz, outfielder (1985)

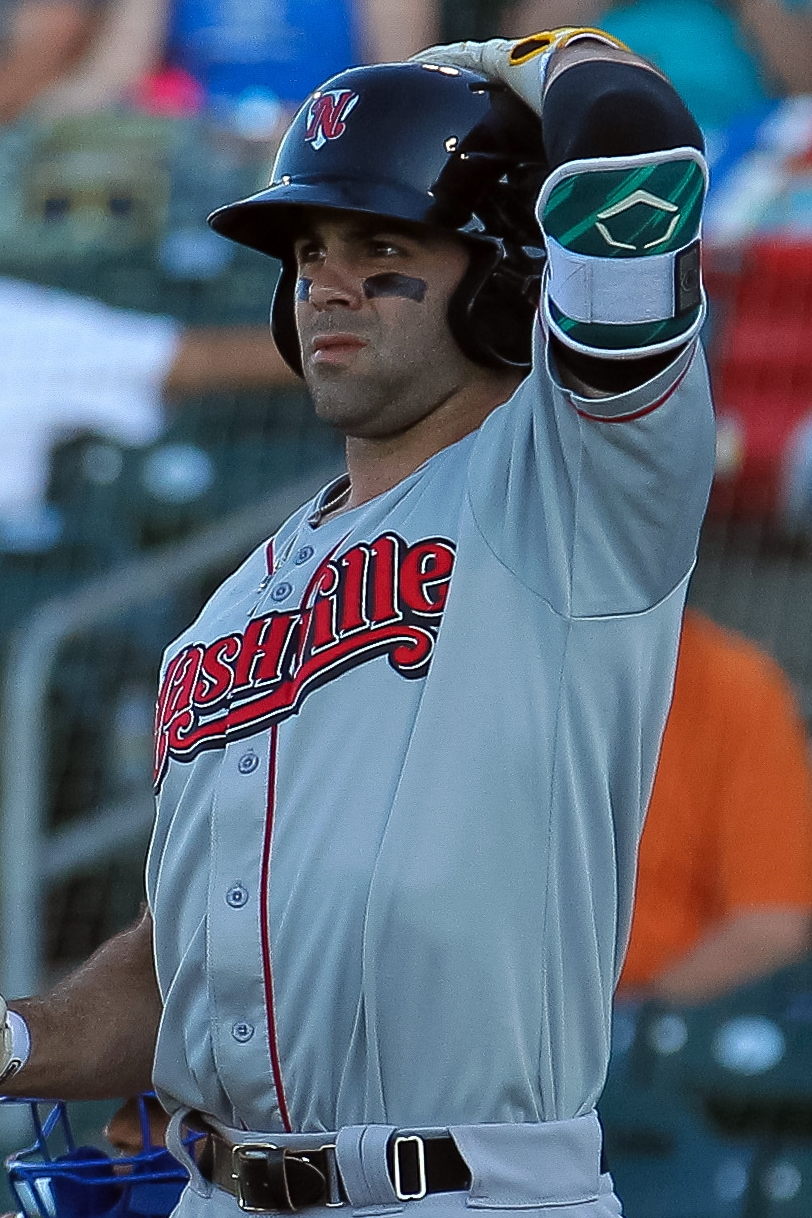
Ryan LaMarre, center fielder (2017)

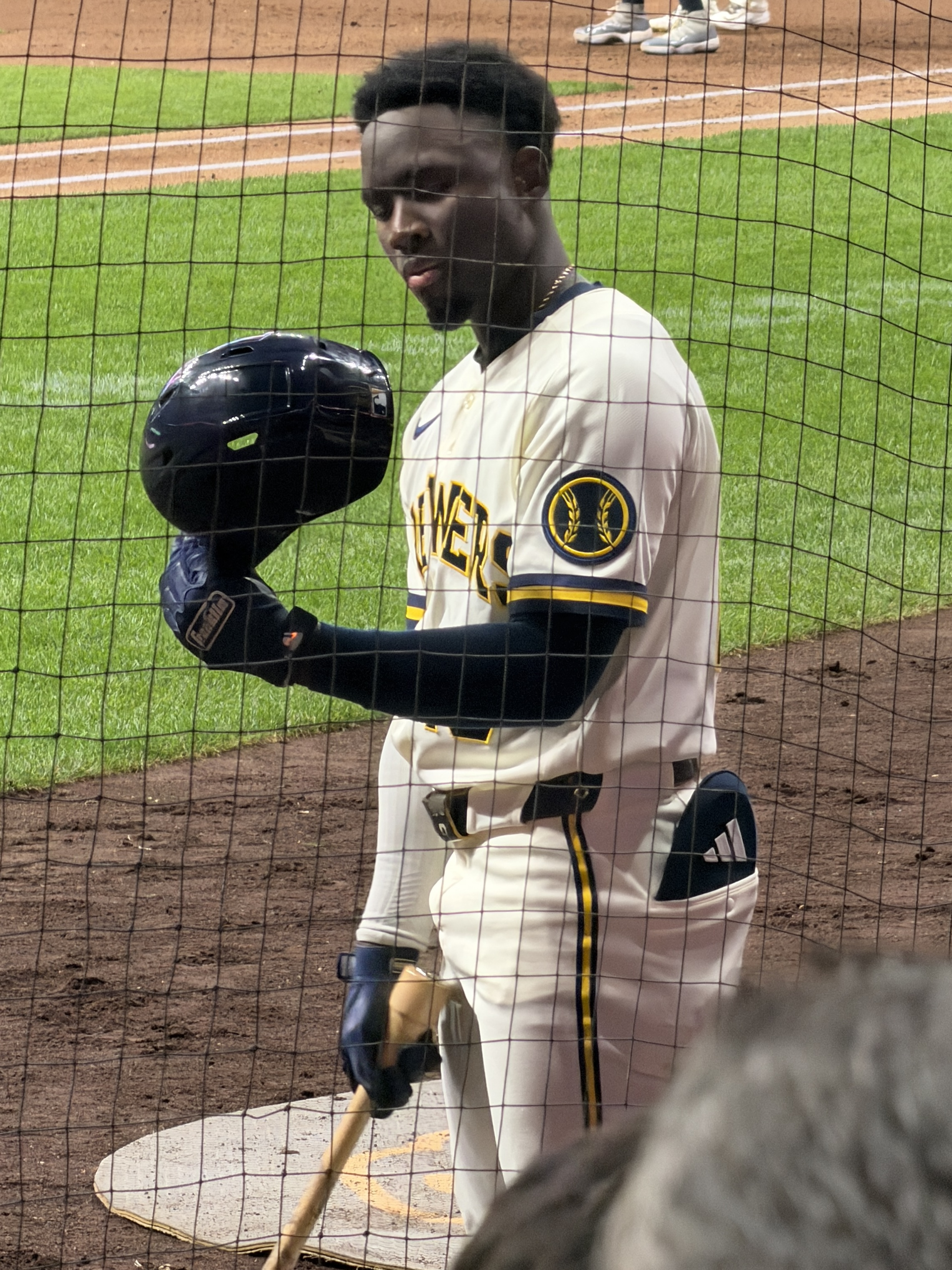
Luis Lara, center fielder (2016)

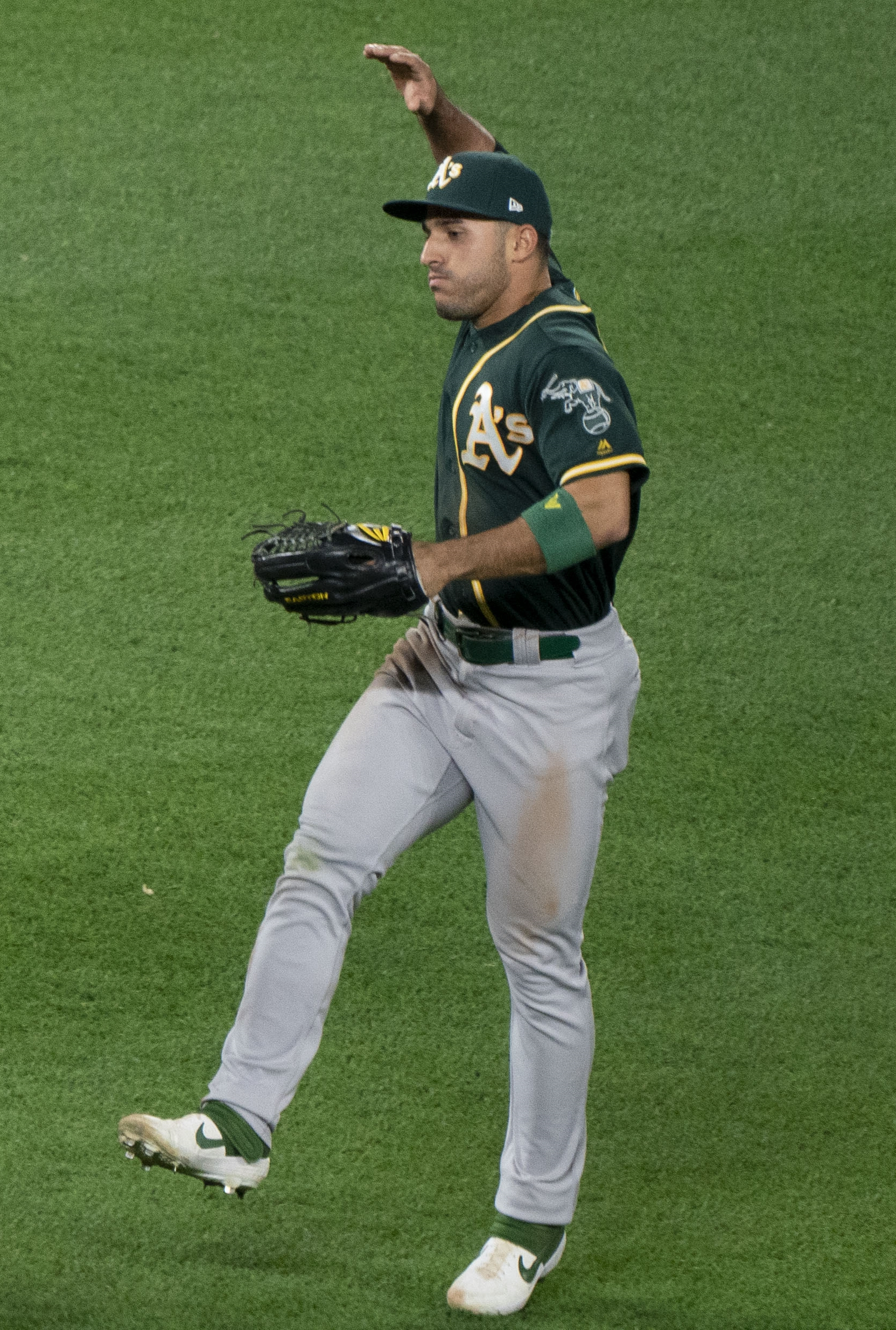
Ramón Laureano, right fielder and center fielder (2018)

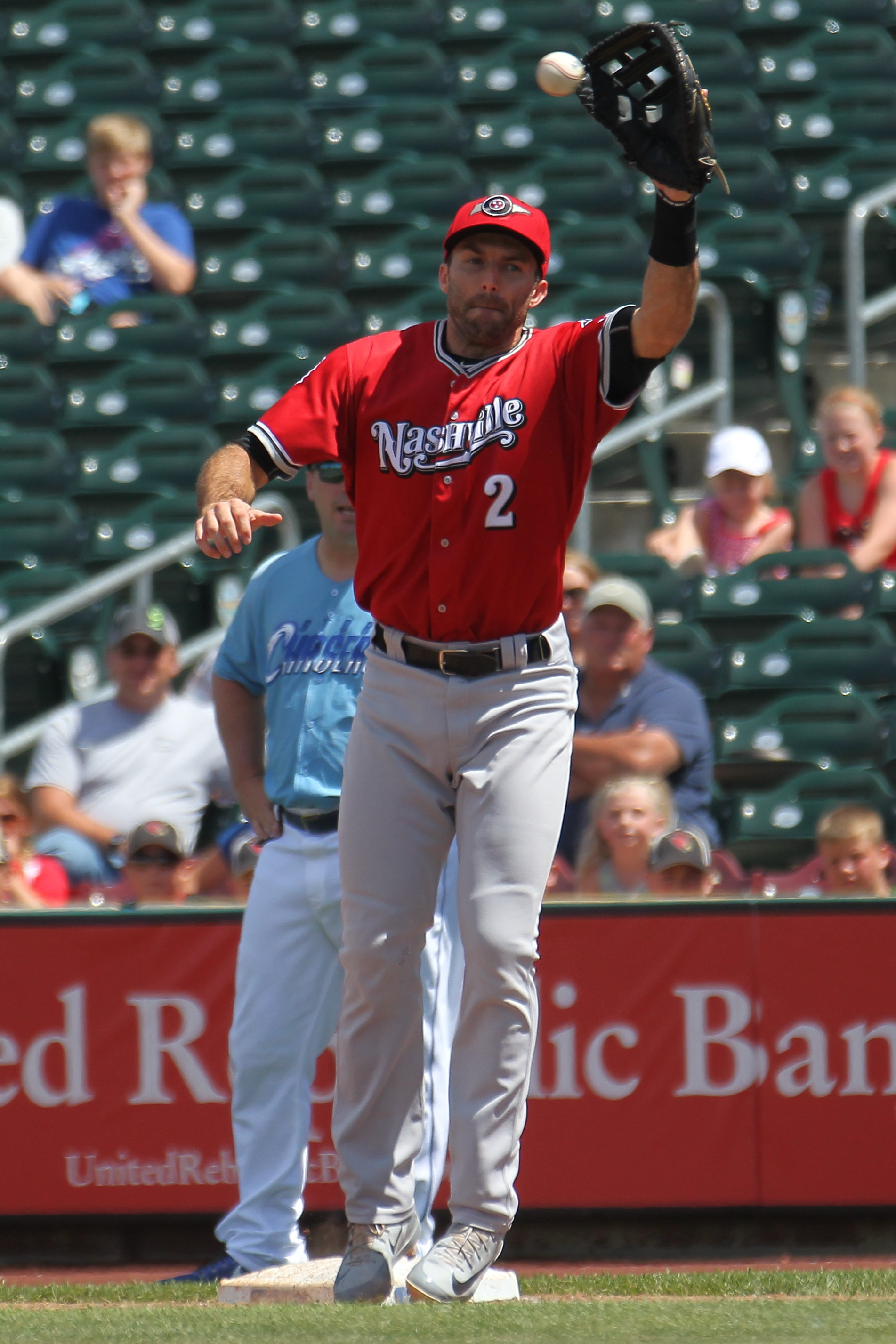
Steve Lombardozzi Jr., first baseman and second baseman (2018)

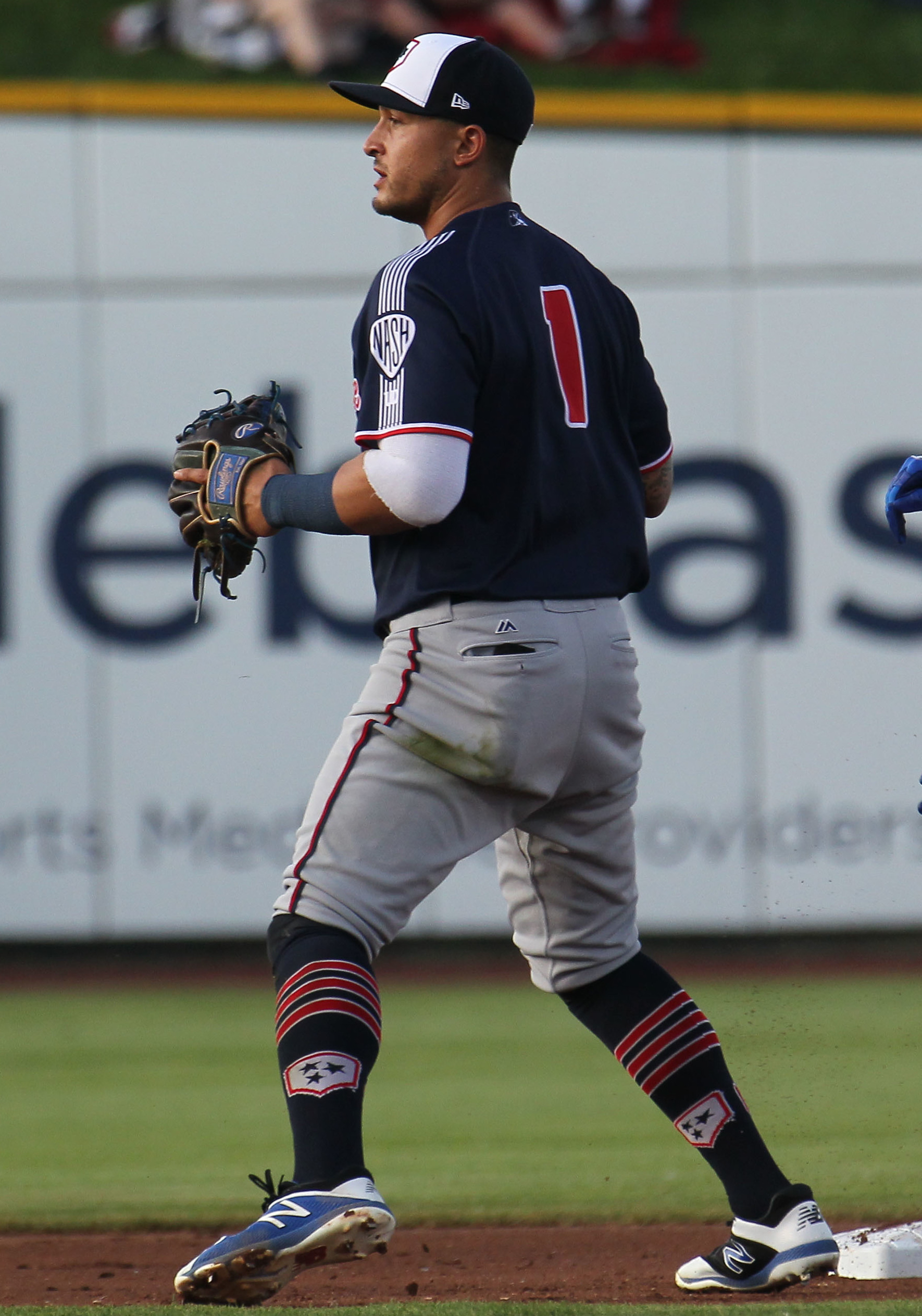
Christian Lopes, second baseman and outfielder (2019)

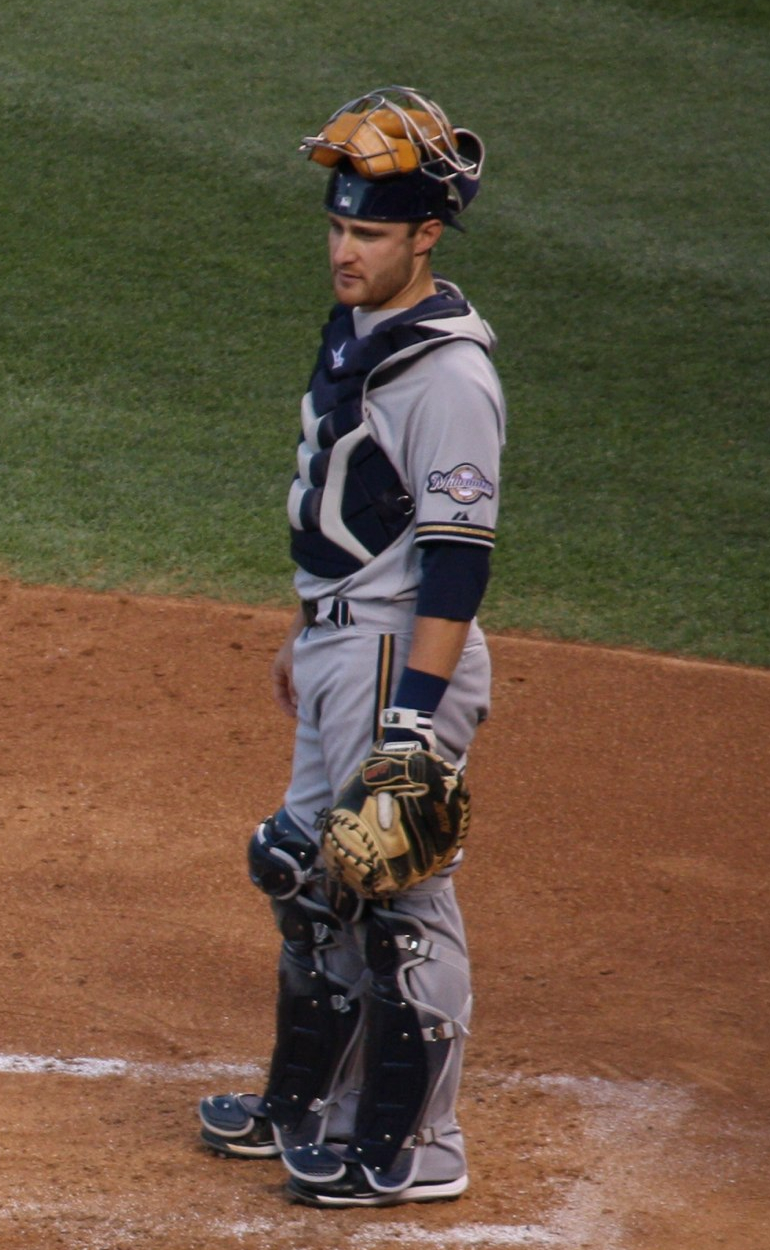
Jonathan Lucroy, catcher (2010, 2012)

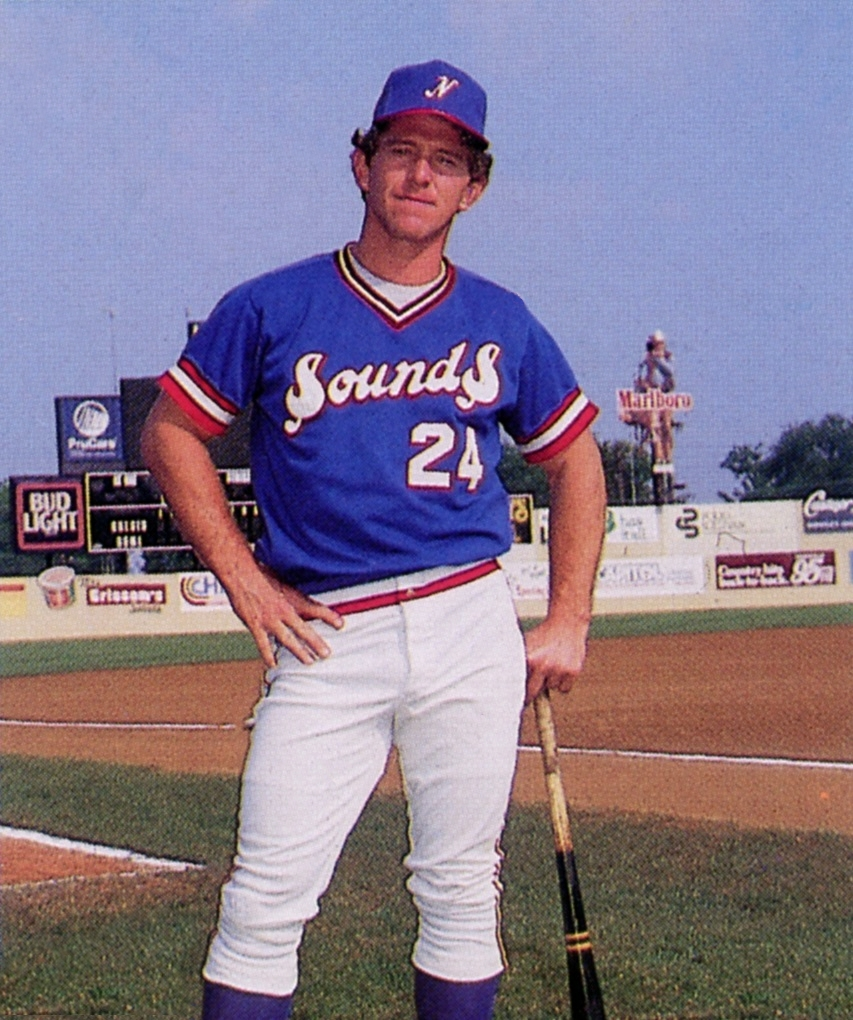
Scotti Madison, first baseman (1985–1986, 1989)

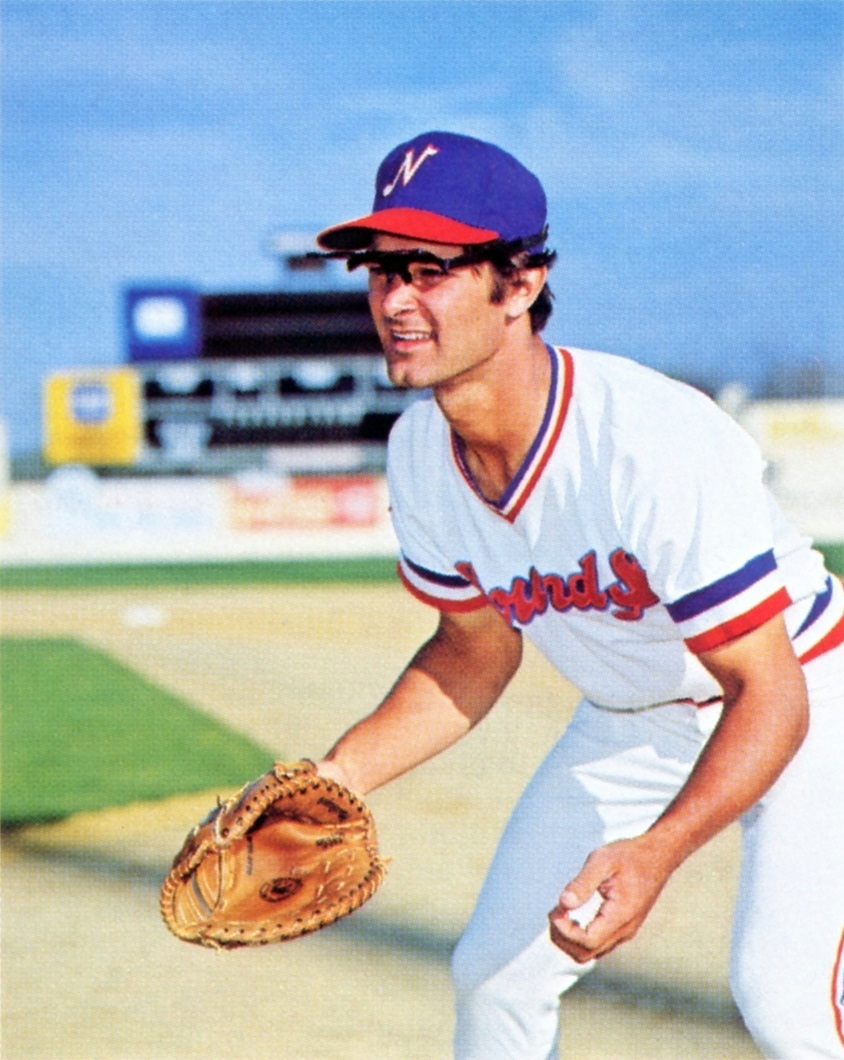
Don Mattingly, first baseman and outfielder (1981)

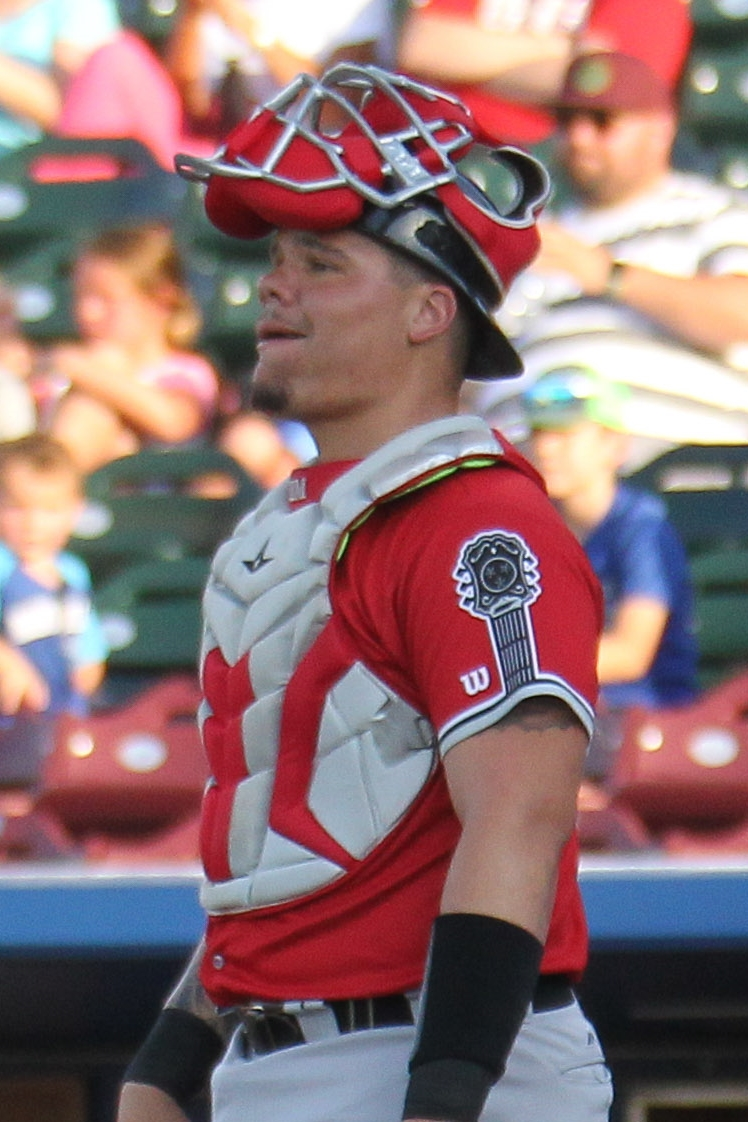
Bruce Maxwell, catcher (2016–2018)

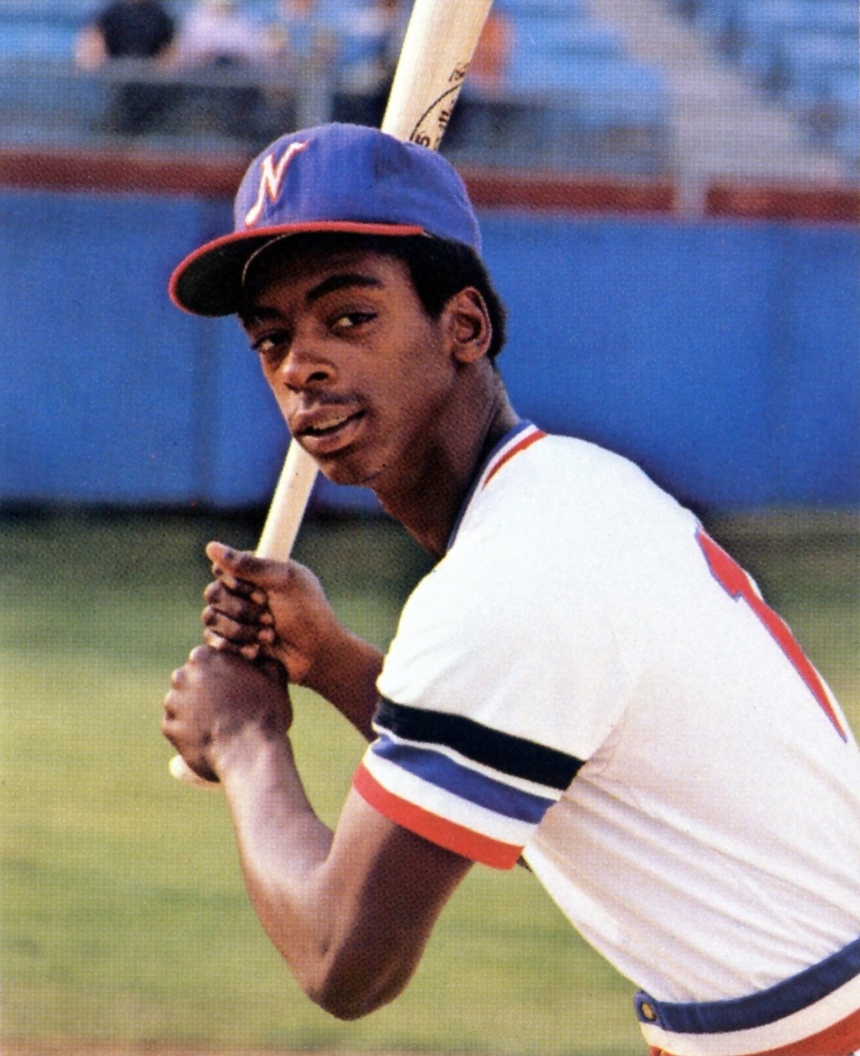
Willie McGee, outfielder (1980–1981)

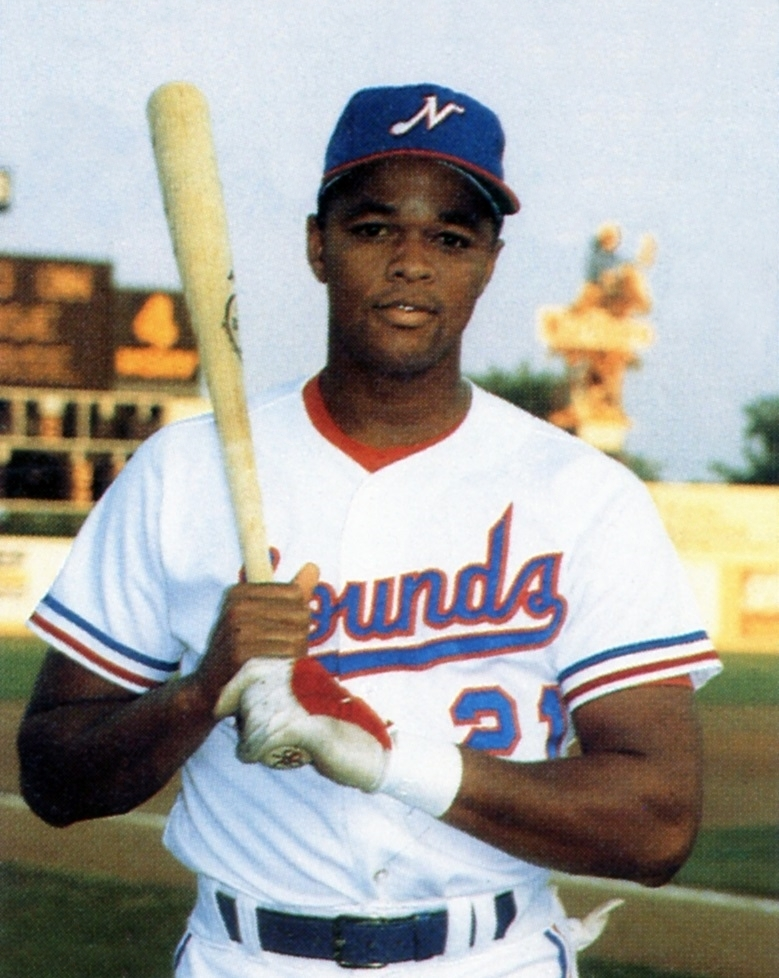
Terry McGriff, catcher (1987–1990)

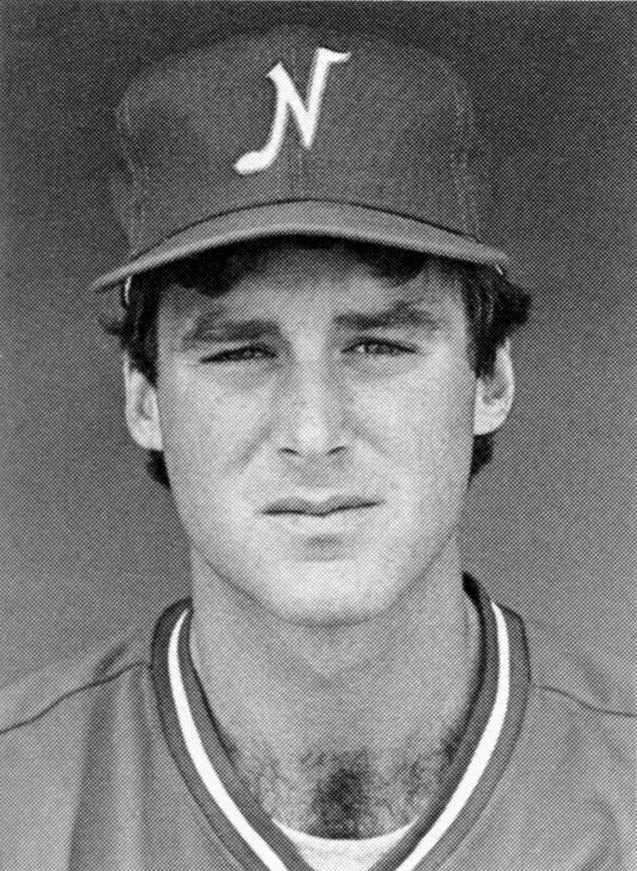
Bob Melvin, catcher (1985)

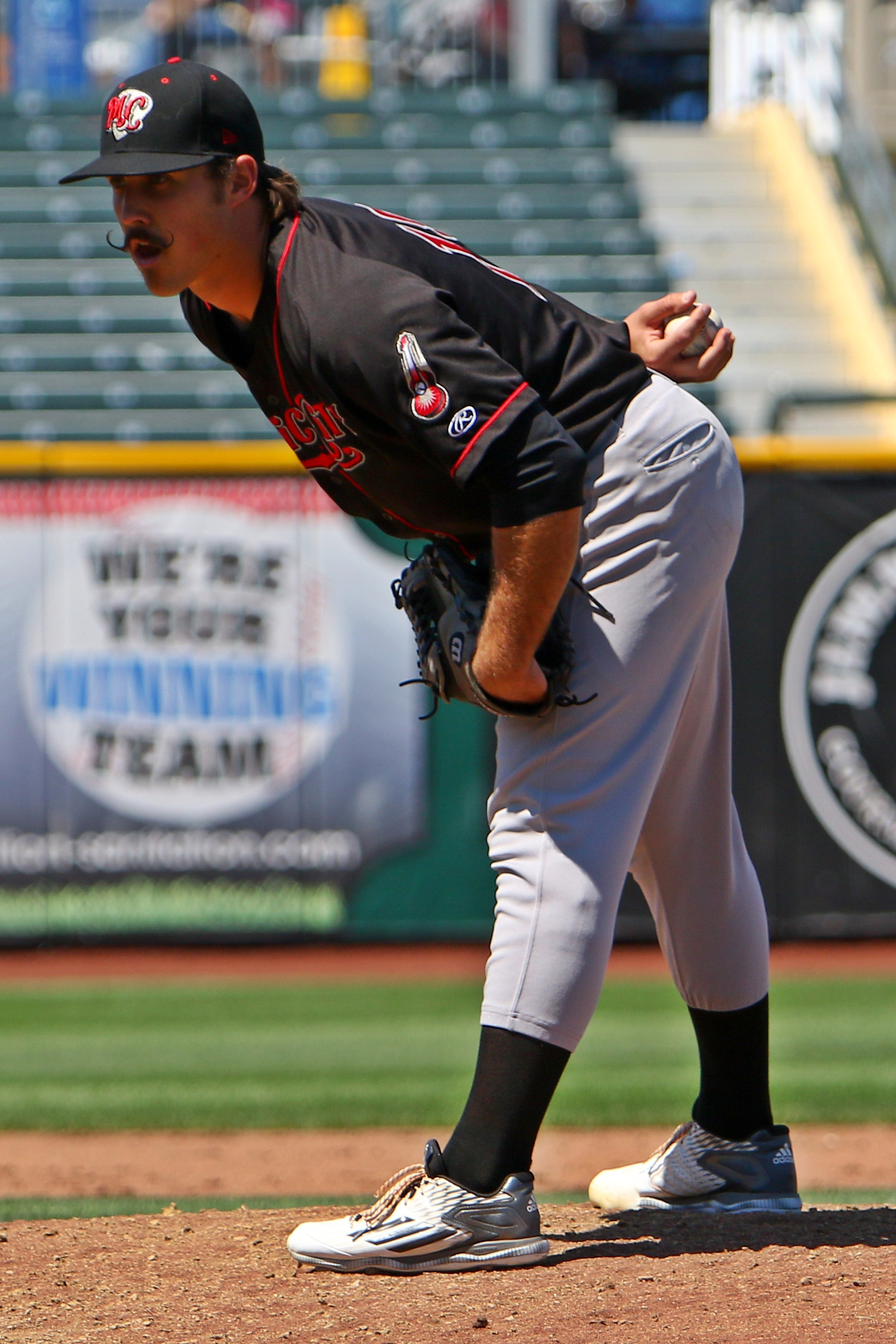
Daniel Mengden, pitcher (2016–2018)

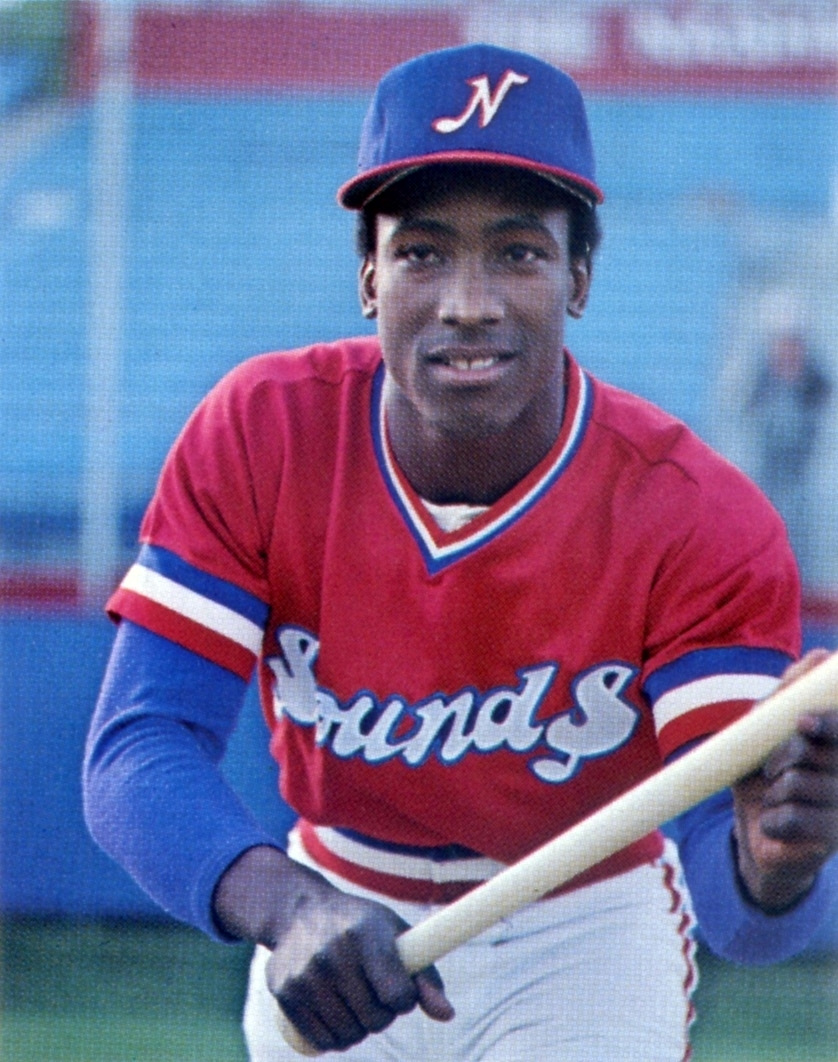
Eddie Milner, outfielder (1979, 1988)

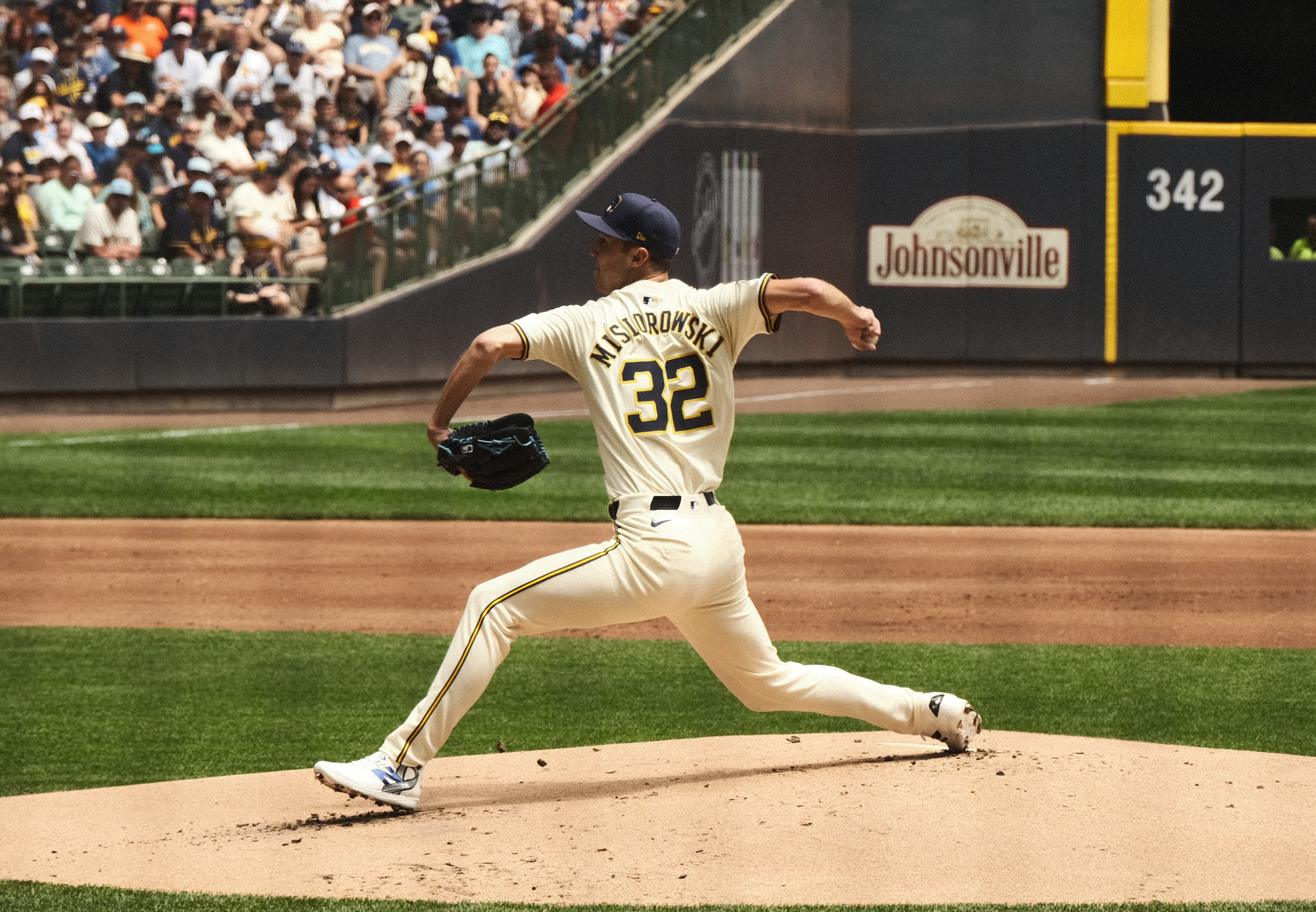
Jacob Misiorowski, pitcher (2024–2025)

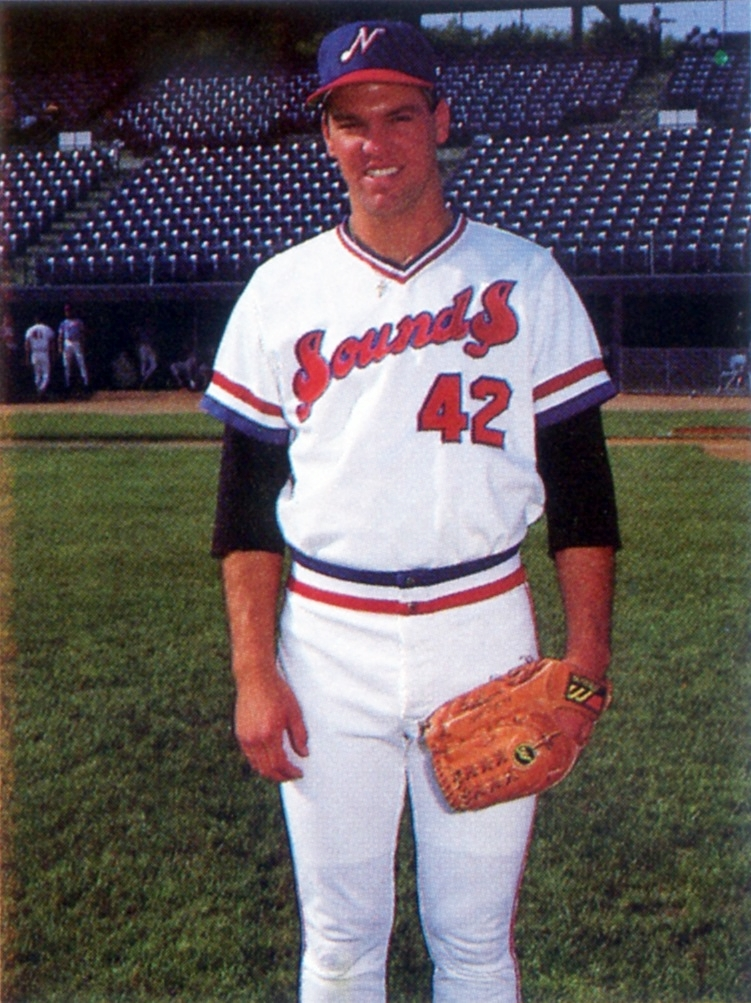
Rich Monteleone, pitcher (1985)

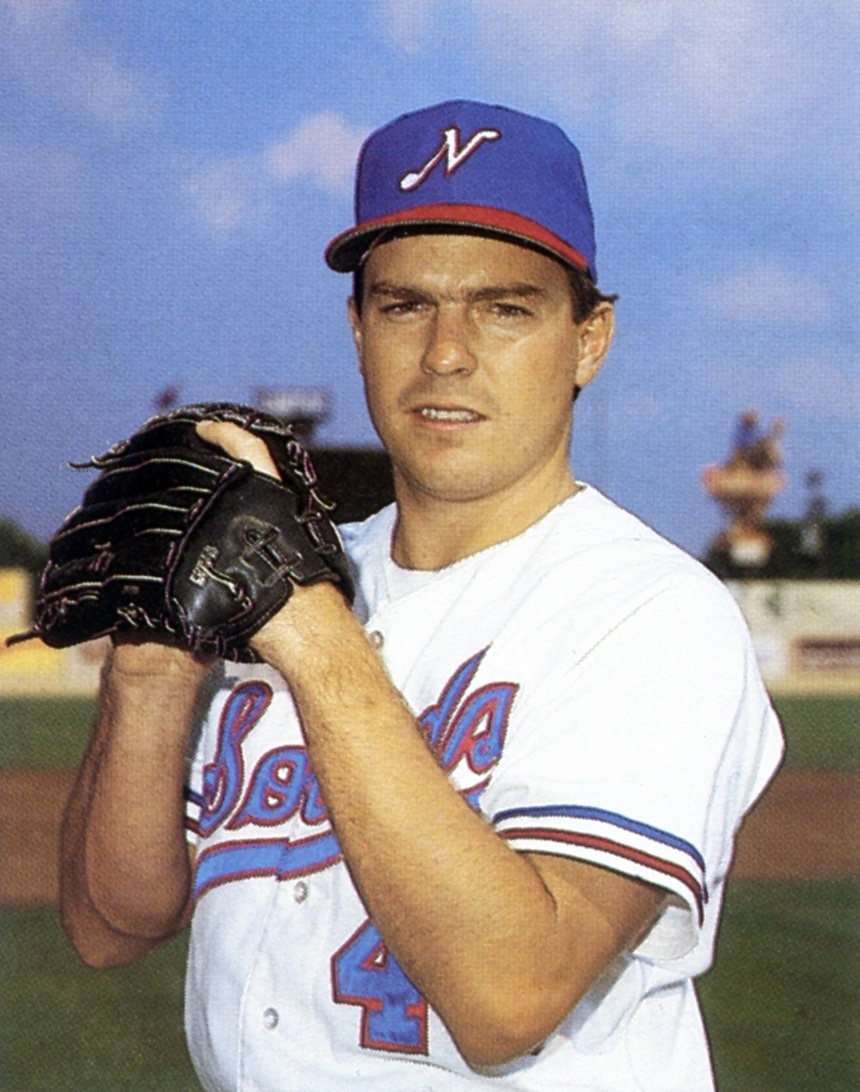
Jeff Montgomery, pitcher (1987)

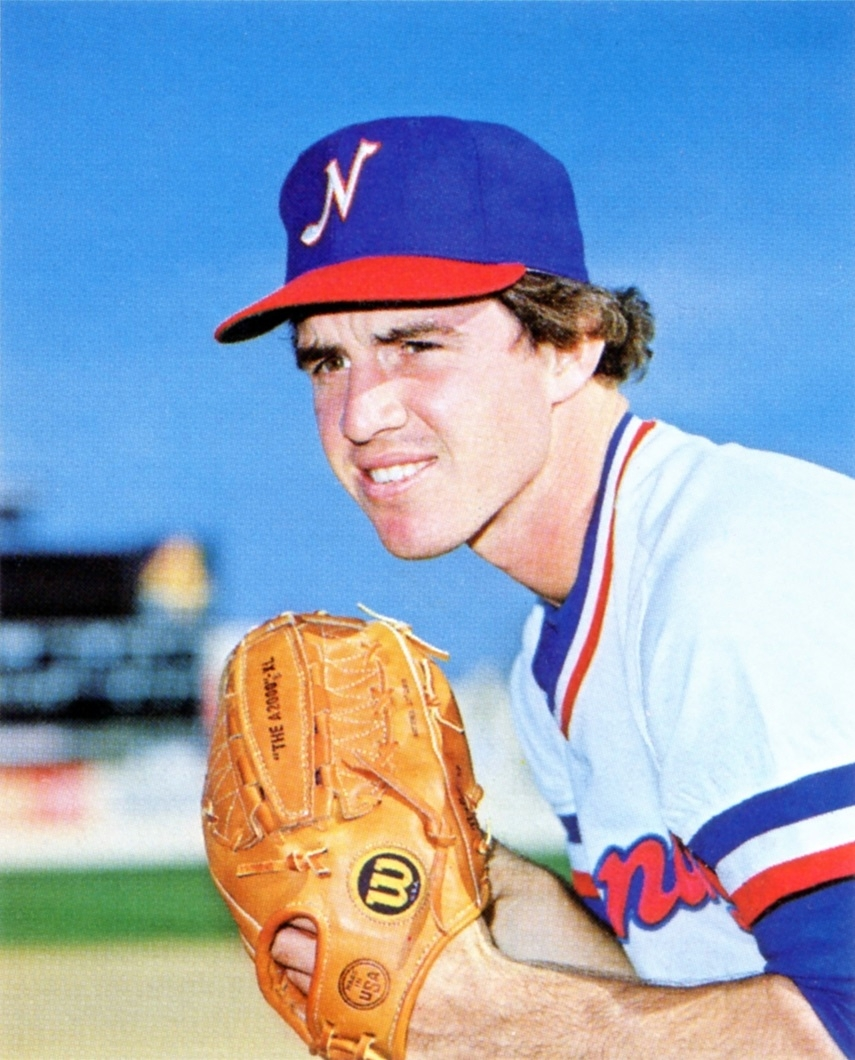
Mike Morgan, pitcher (1981)

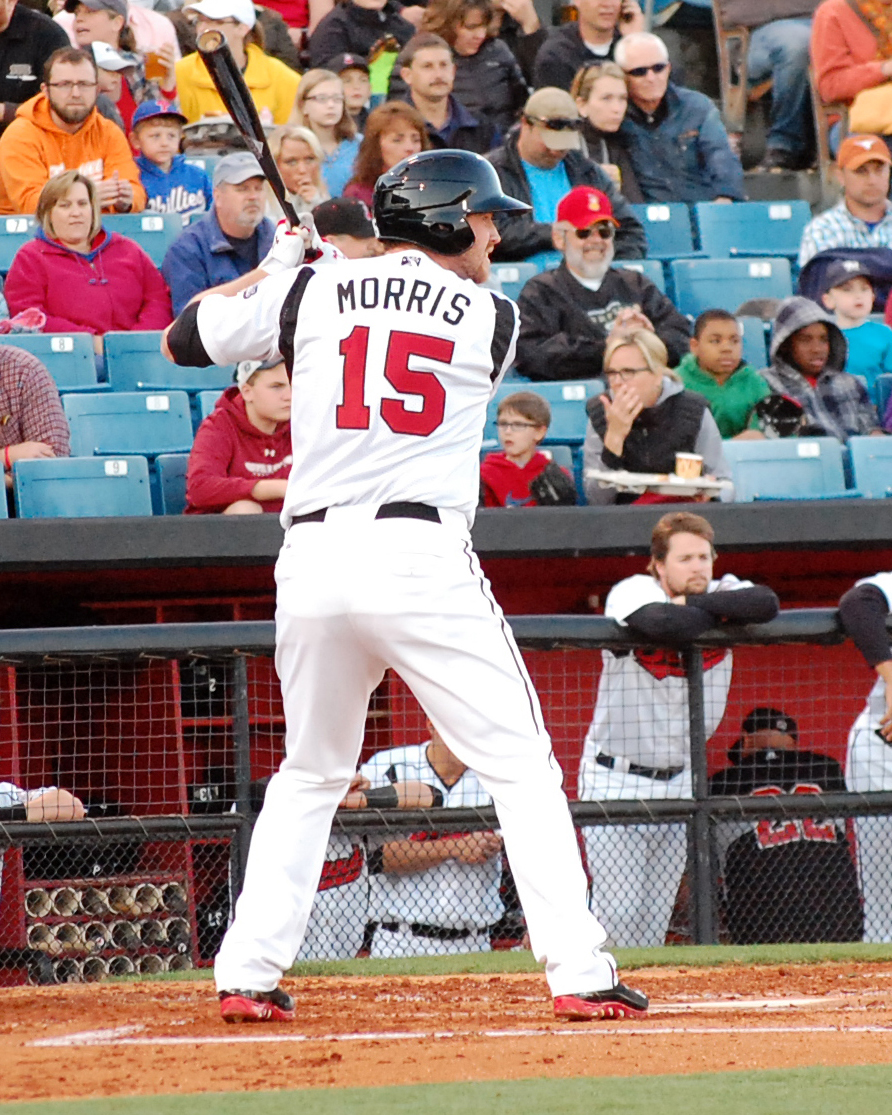
Hunter Morris, first baseman (2013–2014)

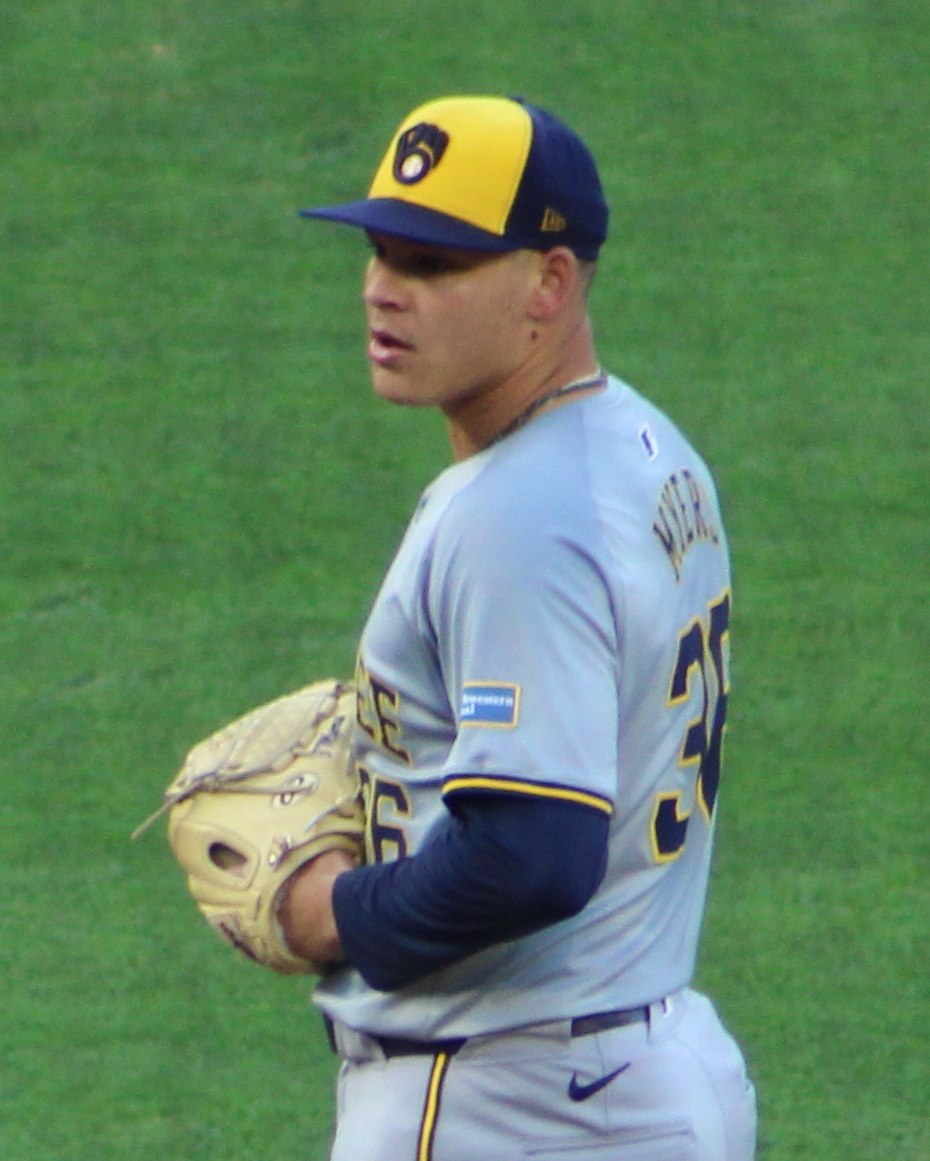
Tobias Myers, pitcher (2023–2025)

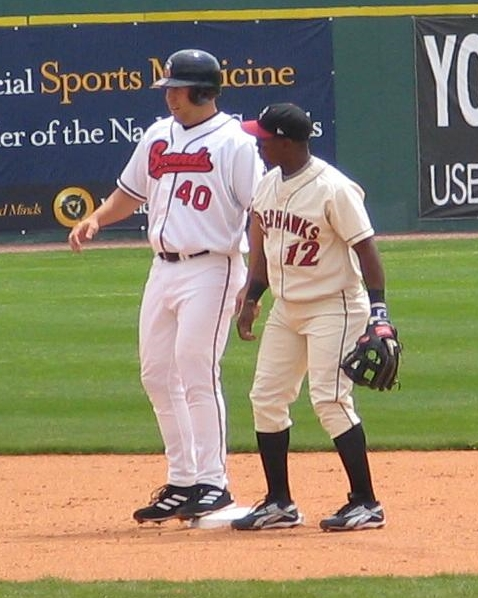
Brad Nelson (left), first baseman (2005–2008)

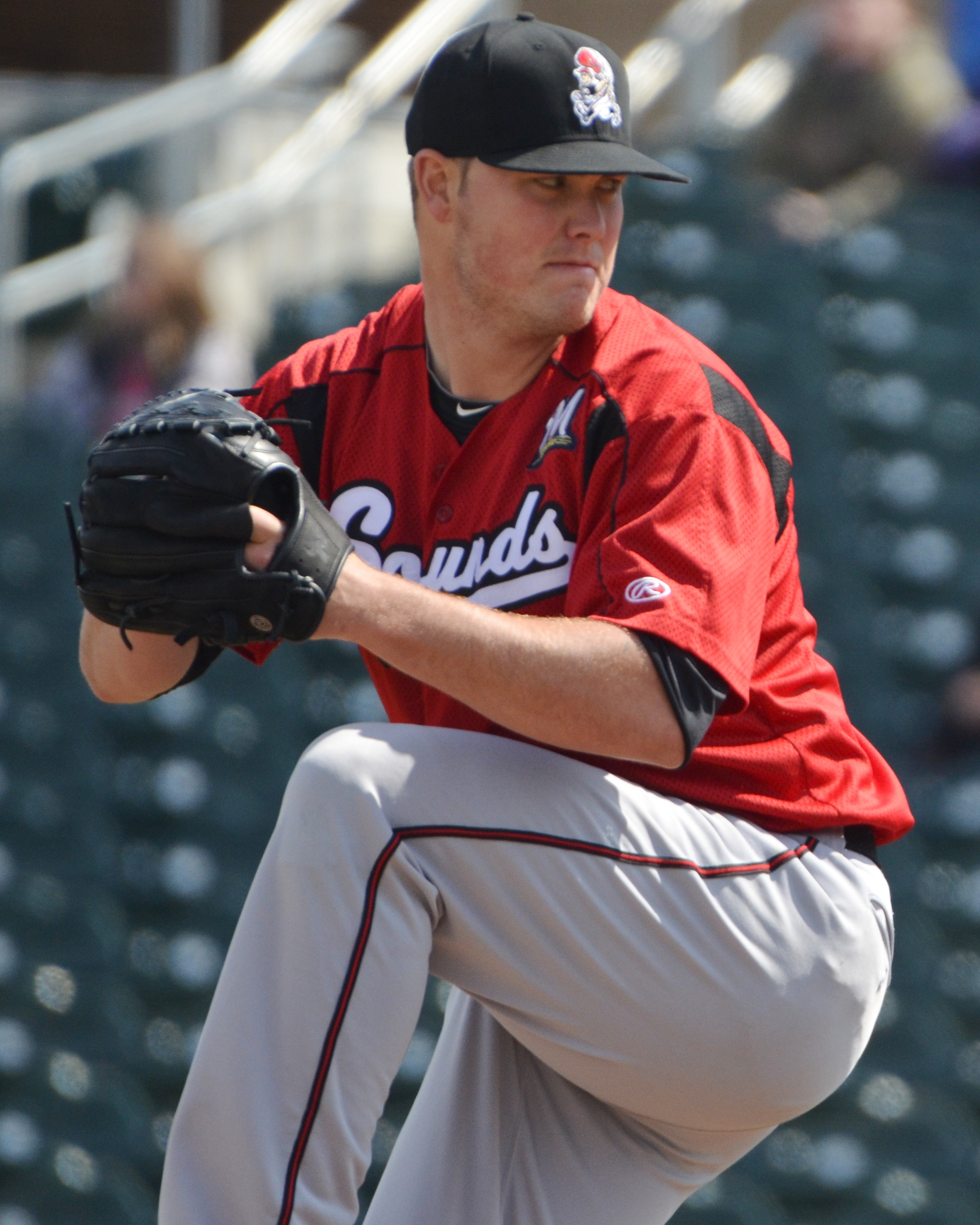
Jimmy Nelson, pitcher (2013–2014)

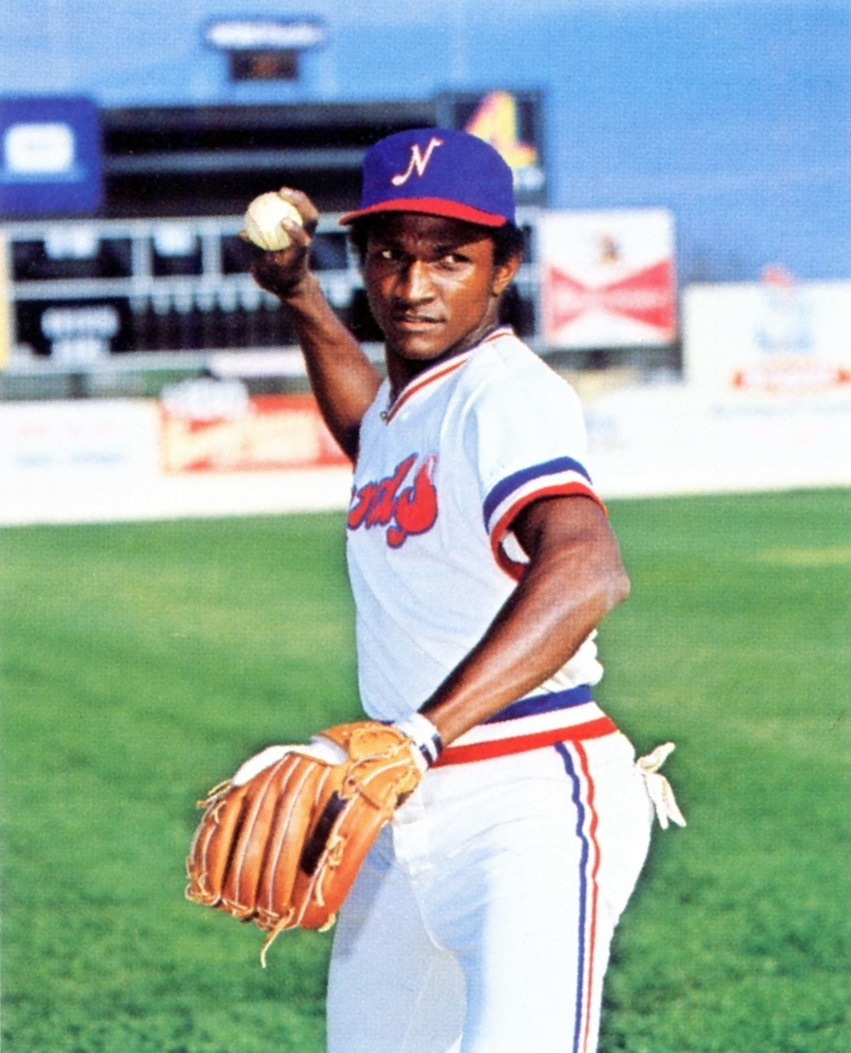
Otis Nixon, shortstop (1981–1982)

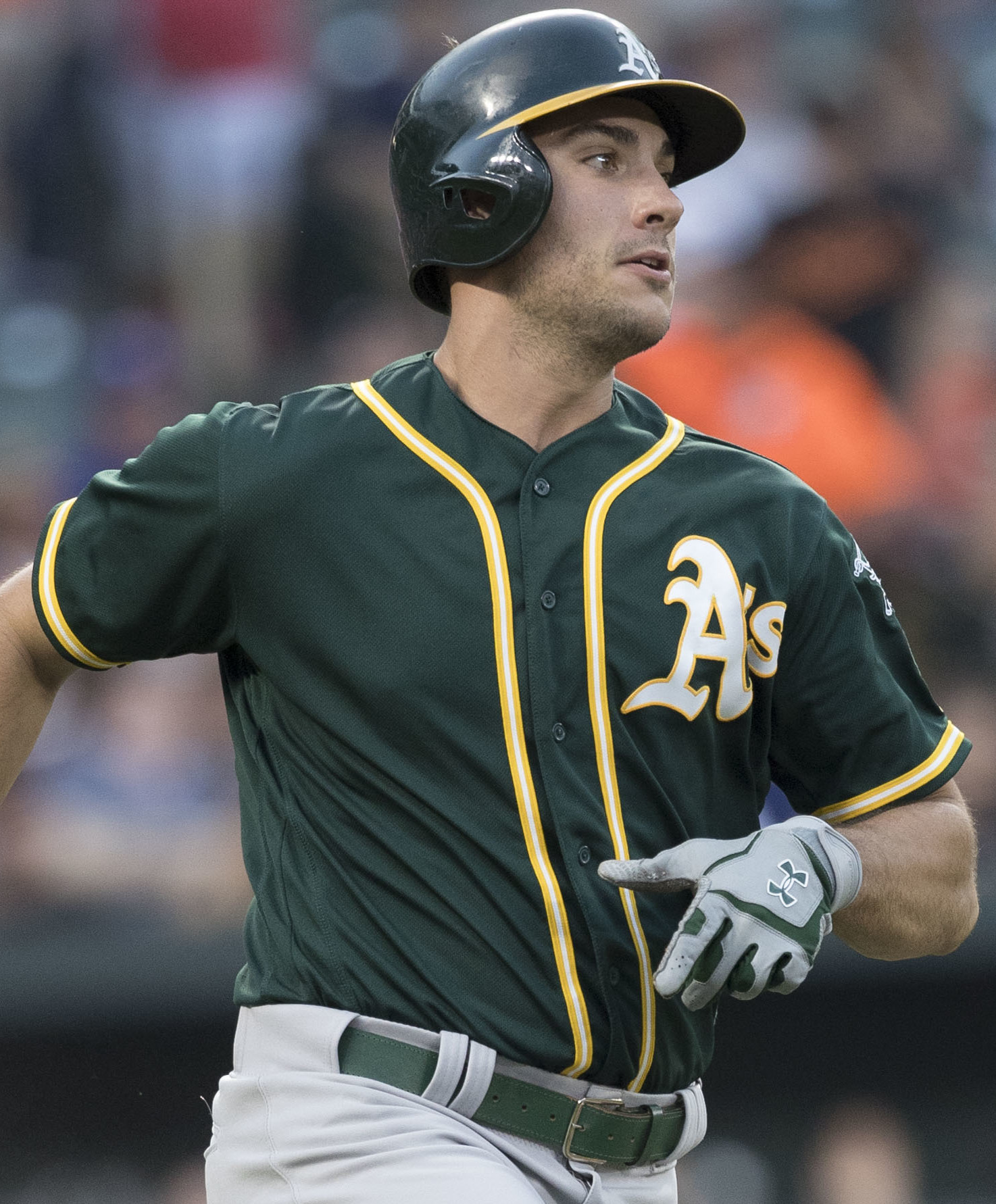
Matt Olson, first baseman and right fielder (2016–2017)

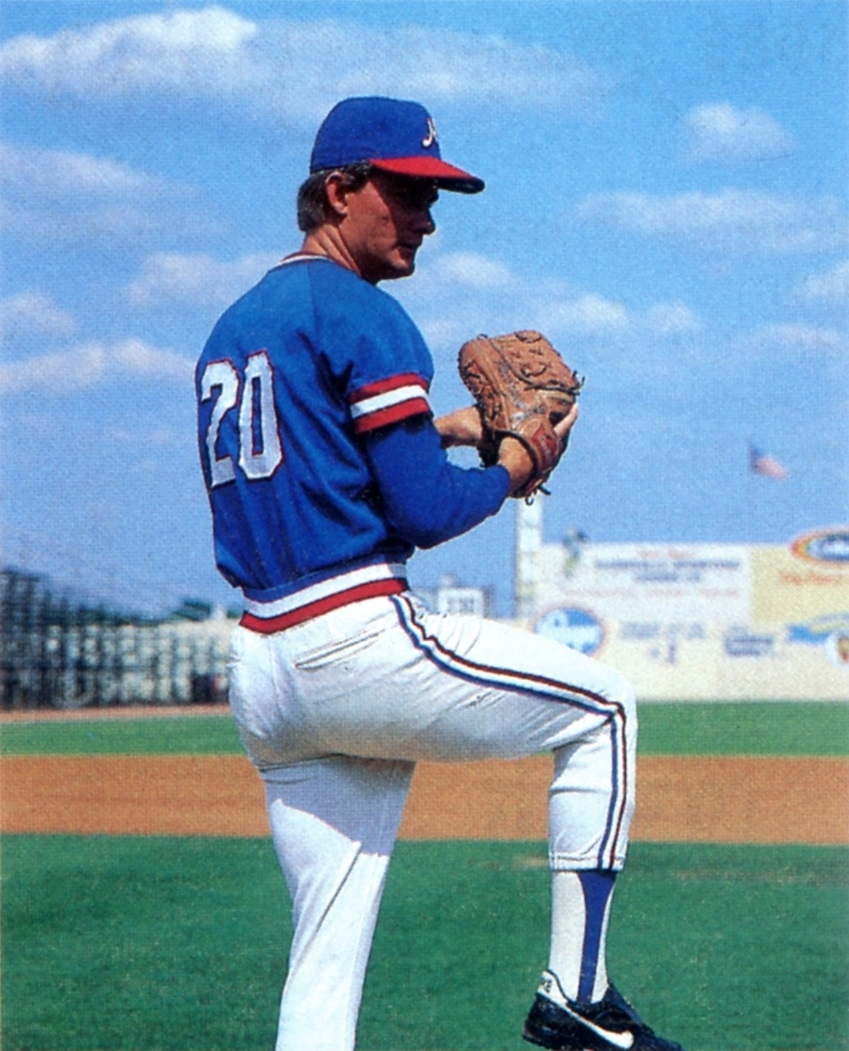
Ed Olwine, pitcher (1983)

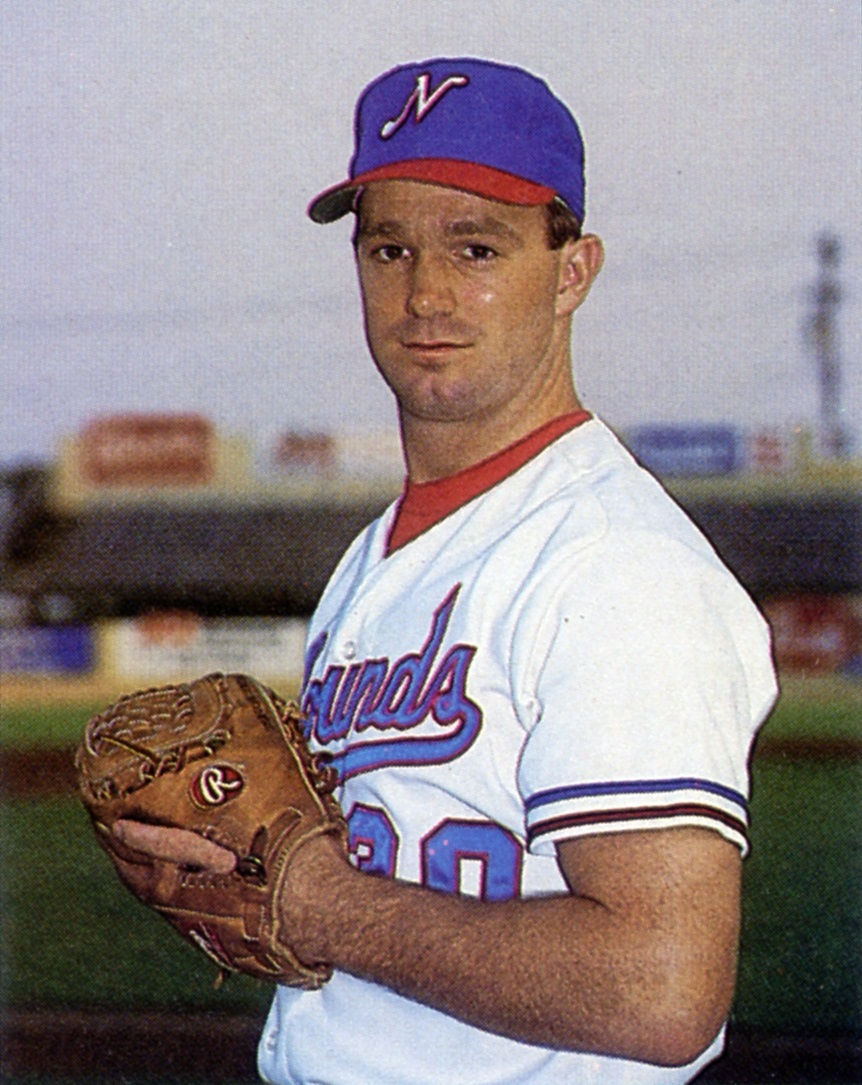
Pat Pacillo, pitcher (1987–1988)

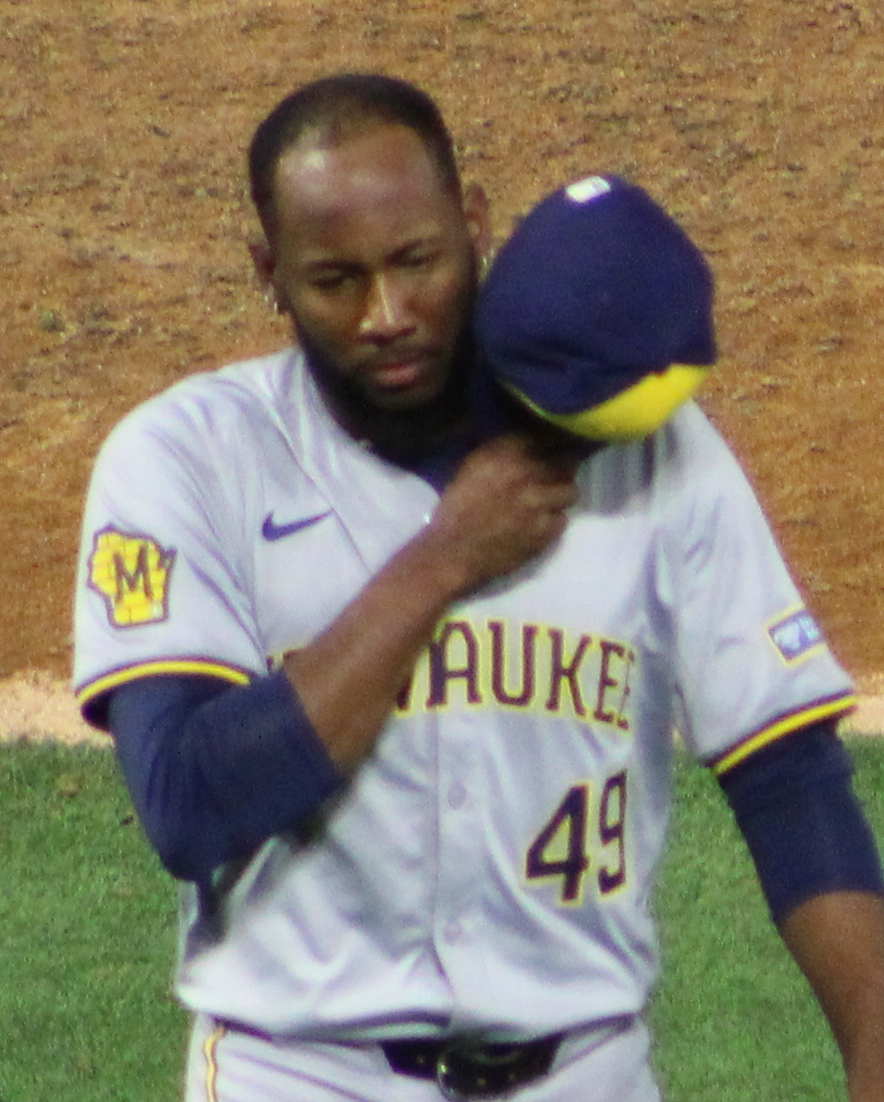
Enoli Paredes, pitcher (2024)

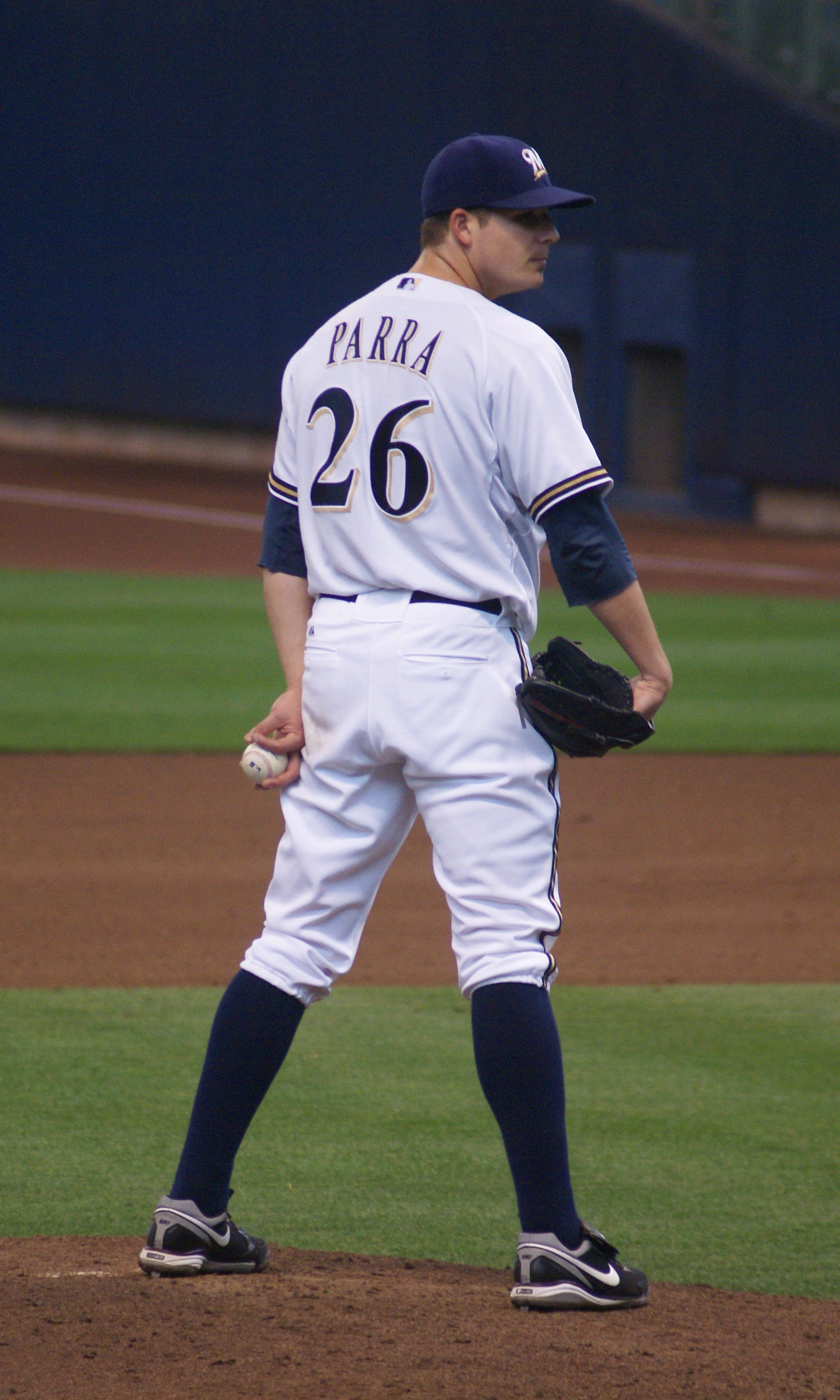
Manny Parra, pitcher (2007, 2009, 2011)

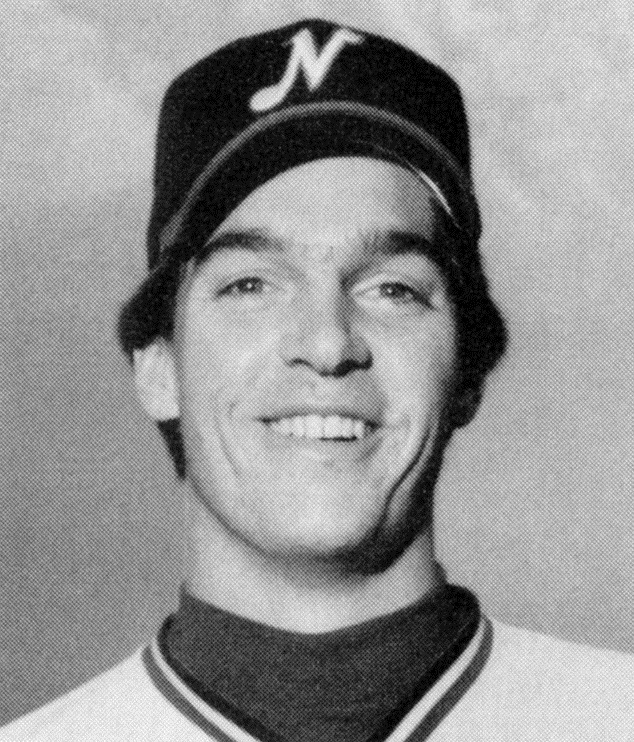
Frank Pastore, pitcher (1978)

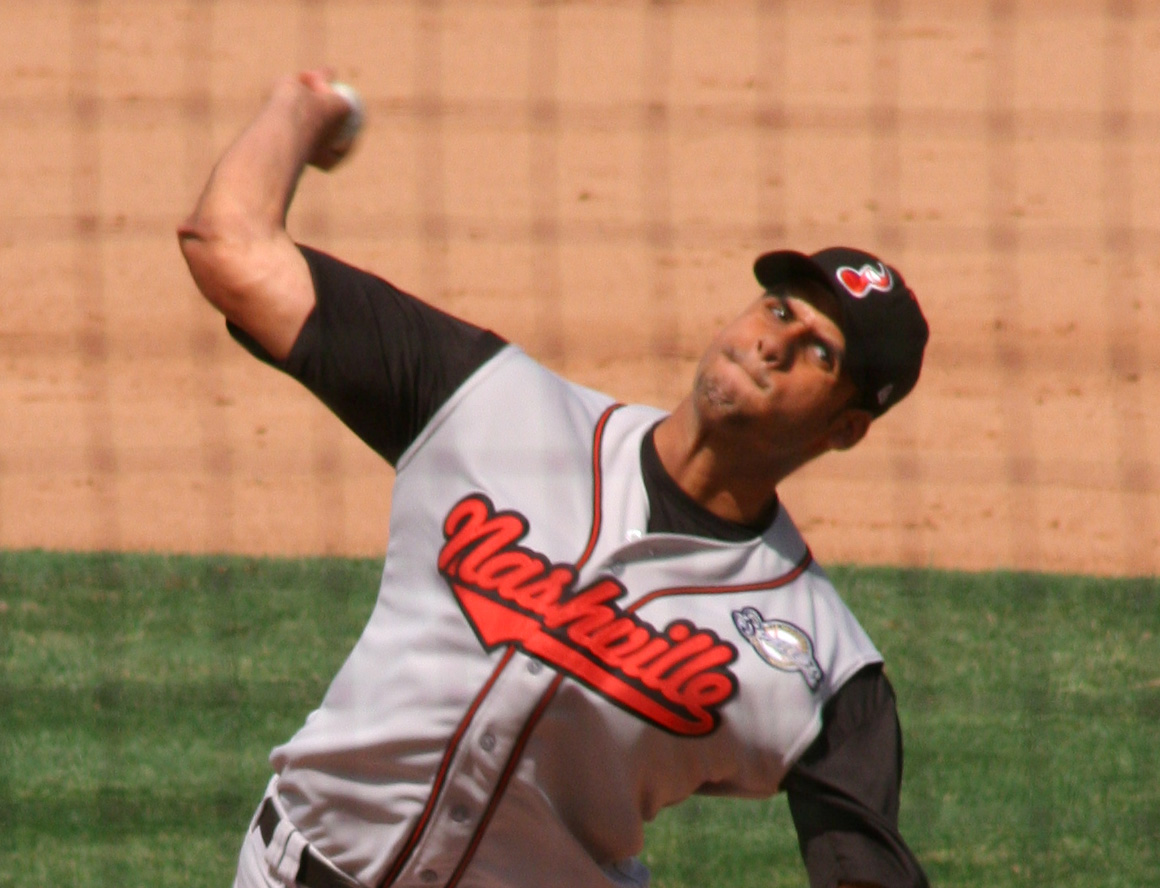
Luis Peña, pitcher (2008)

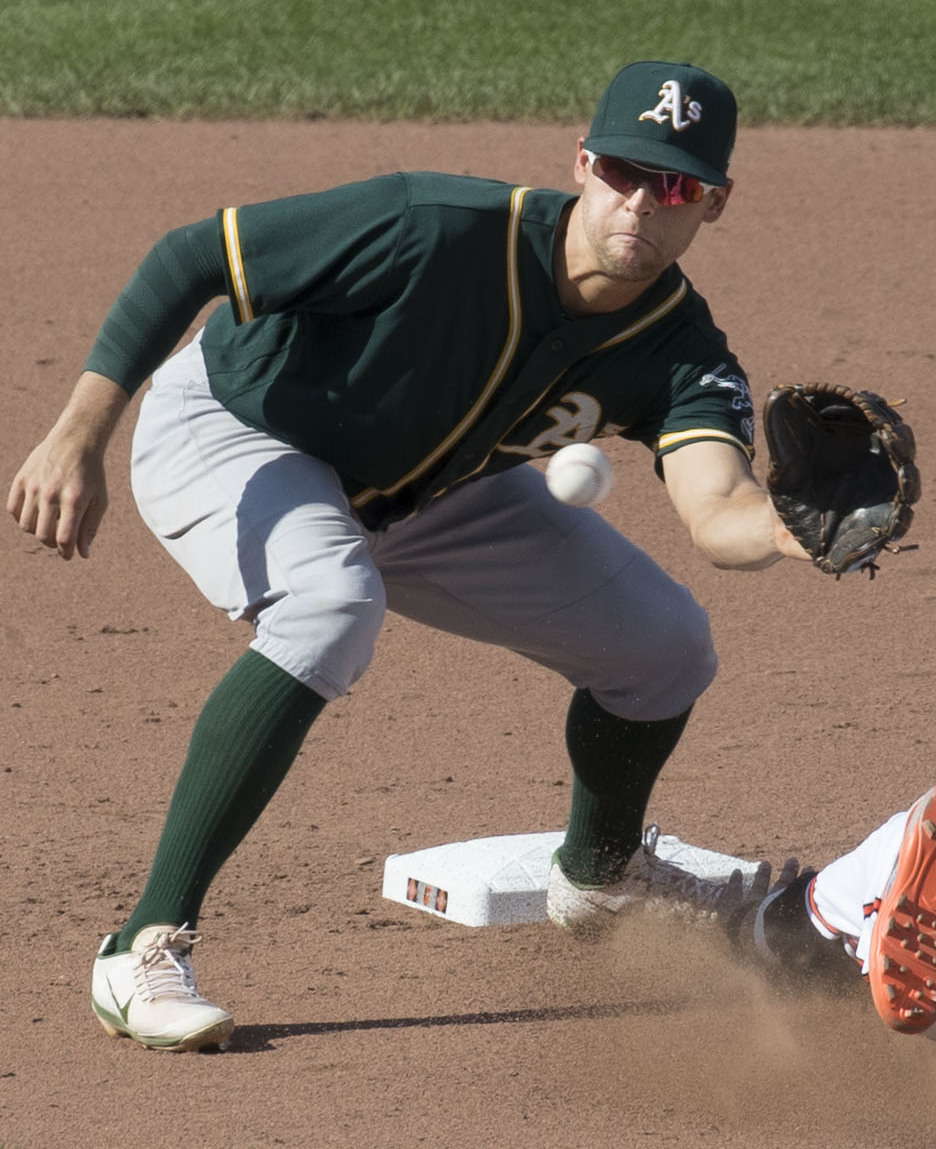
Chad Pinder, shortstop (2016–2017)

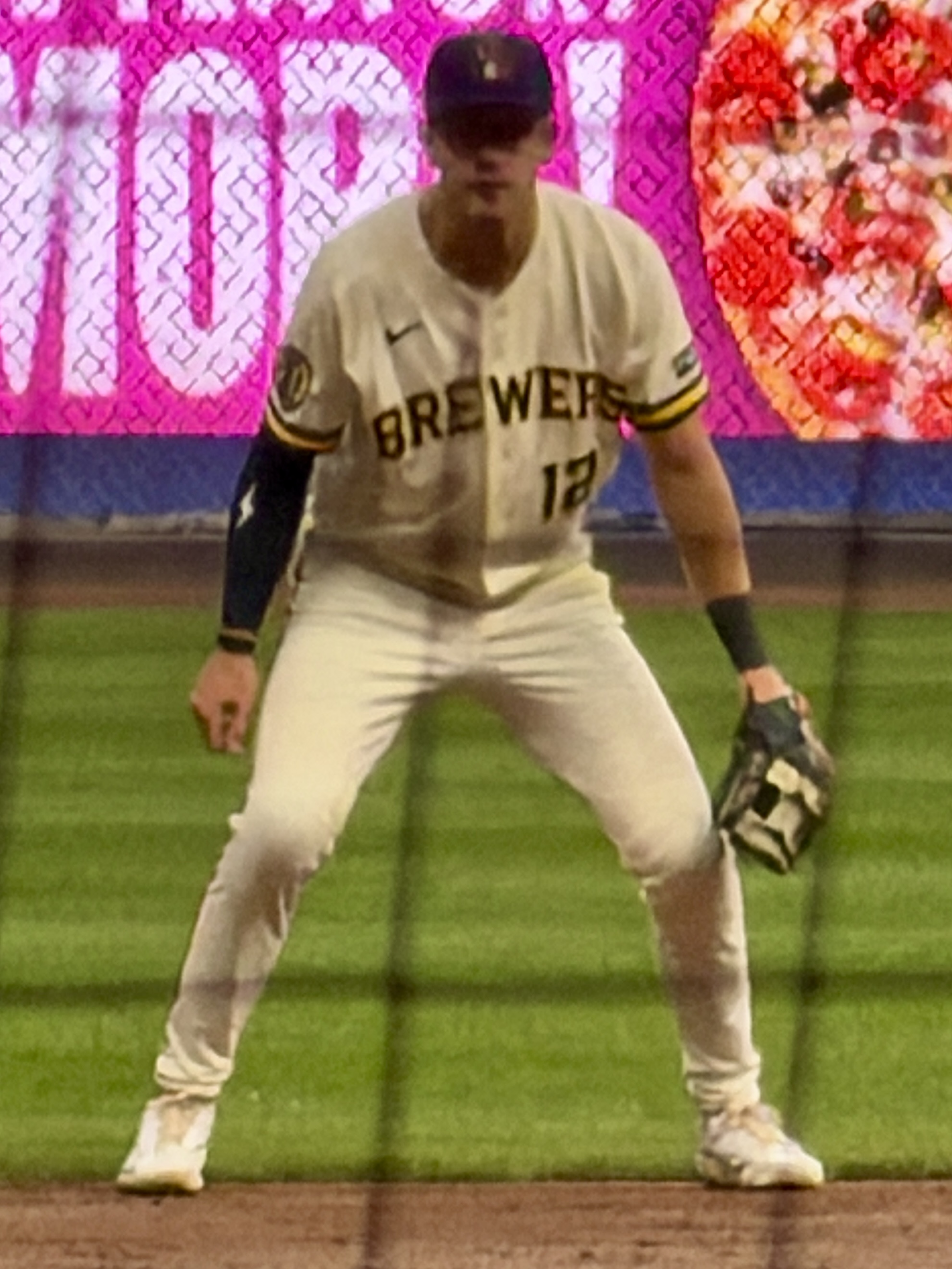
Cooper Pratt, shortstop (2026)

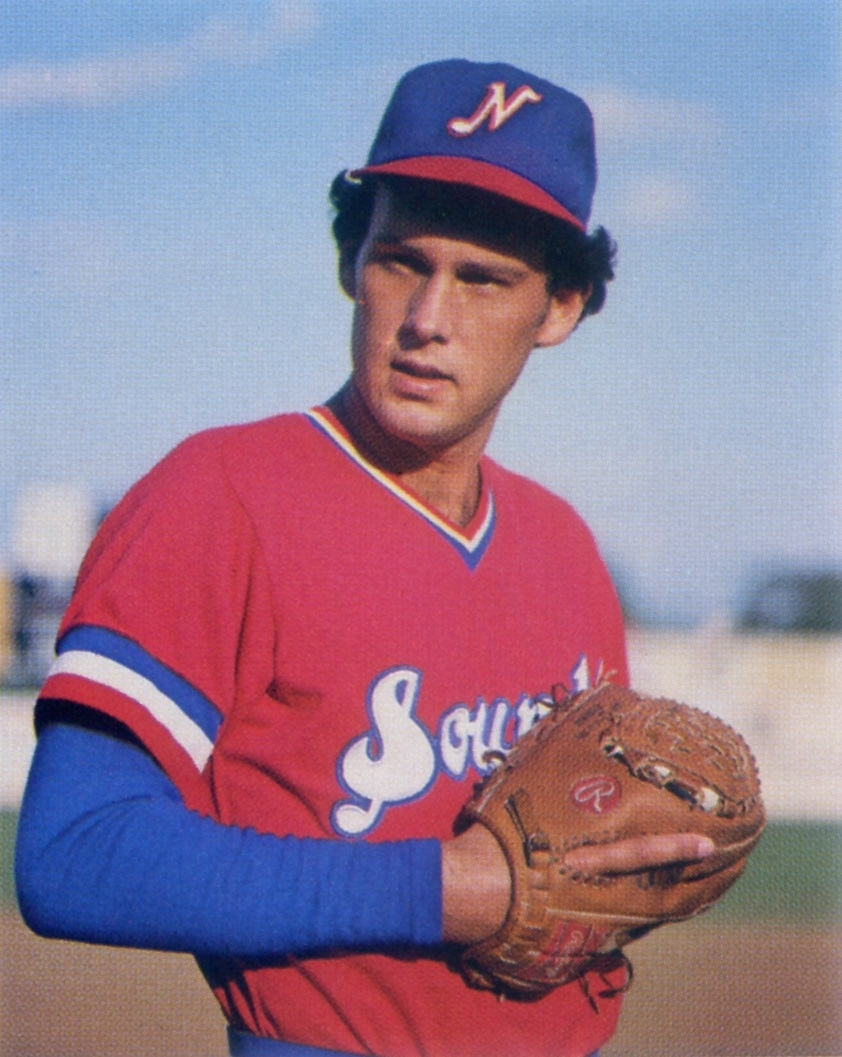
Joe Price, pitcher (1978–1979)

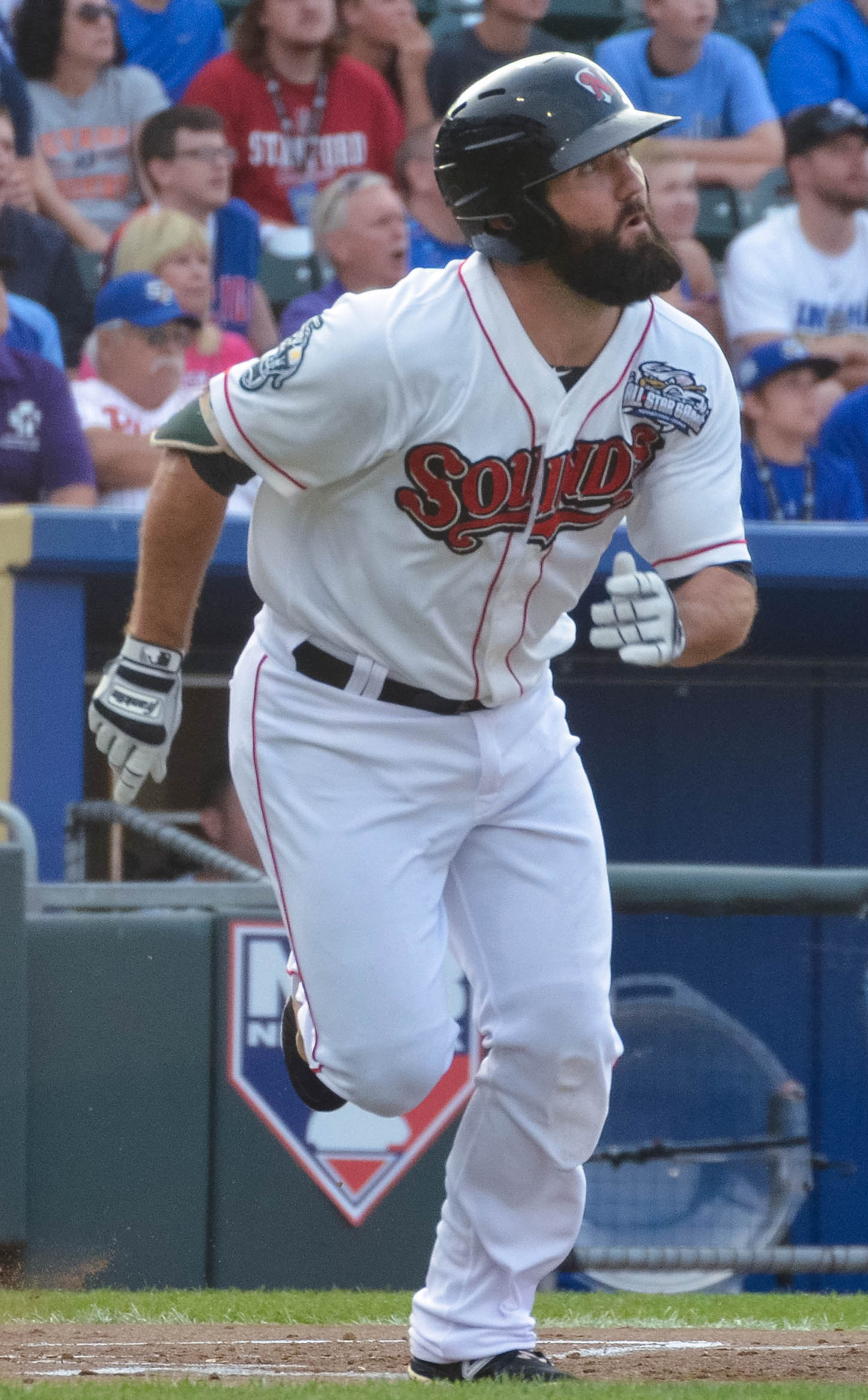
Jason Pridie, right and left fielder (2015)

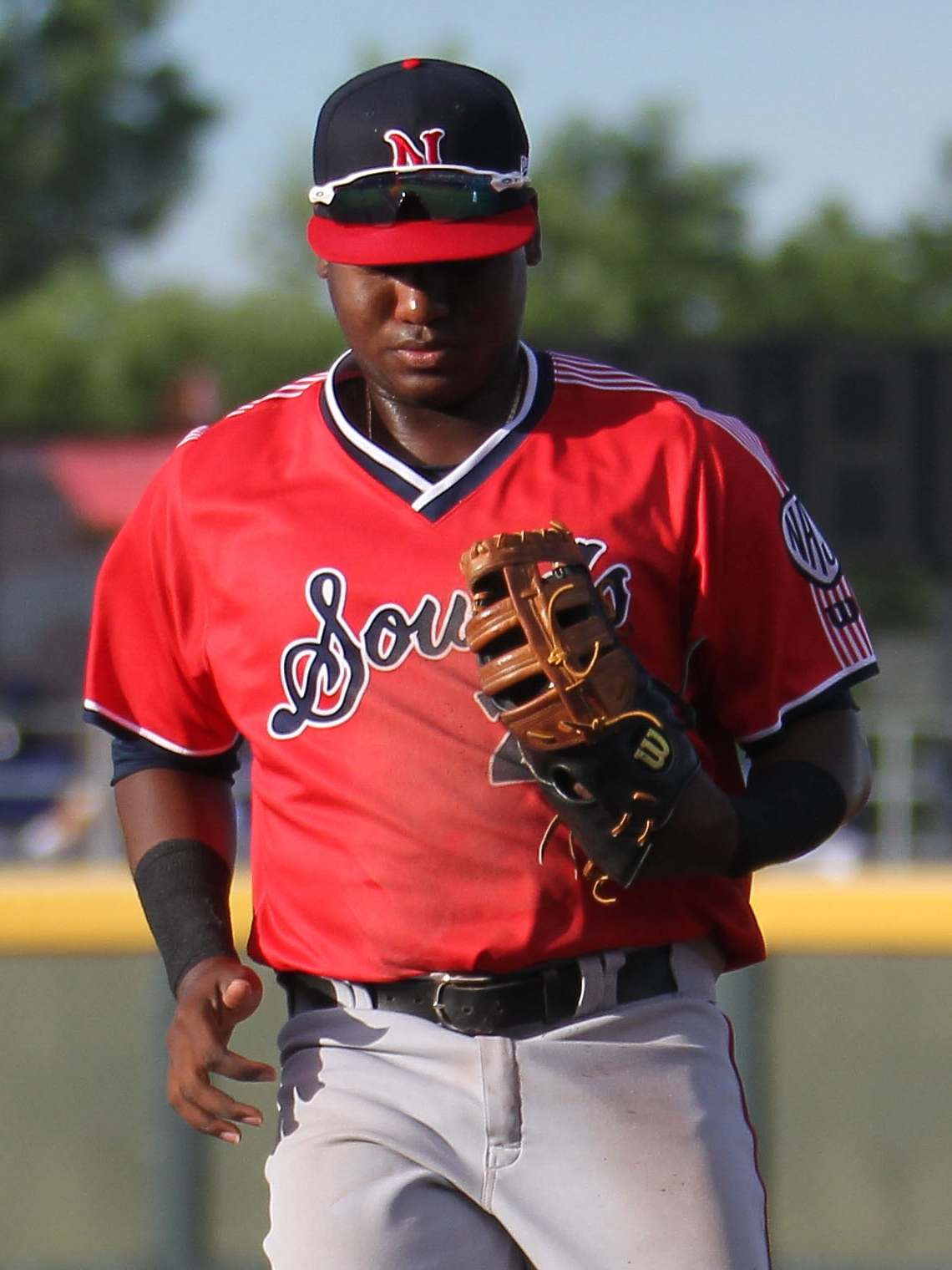
Juremi Profar, first baseman (2019)

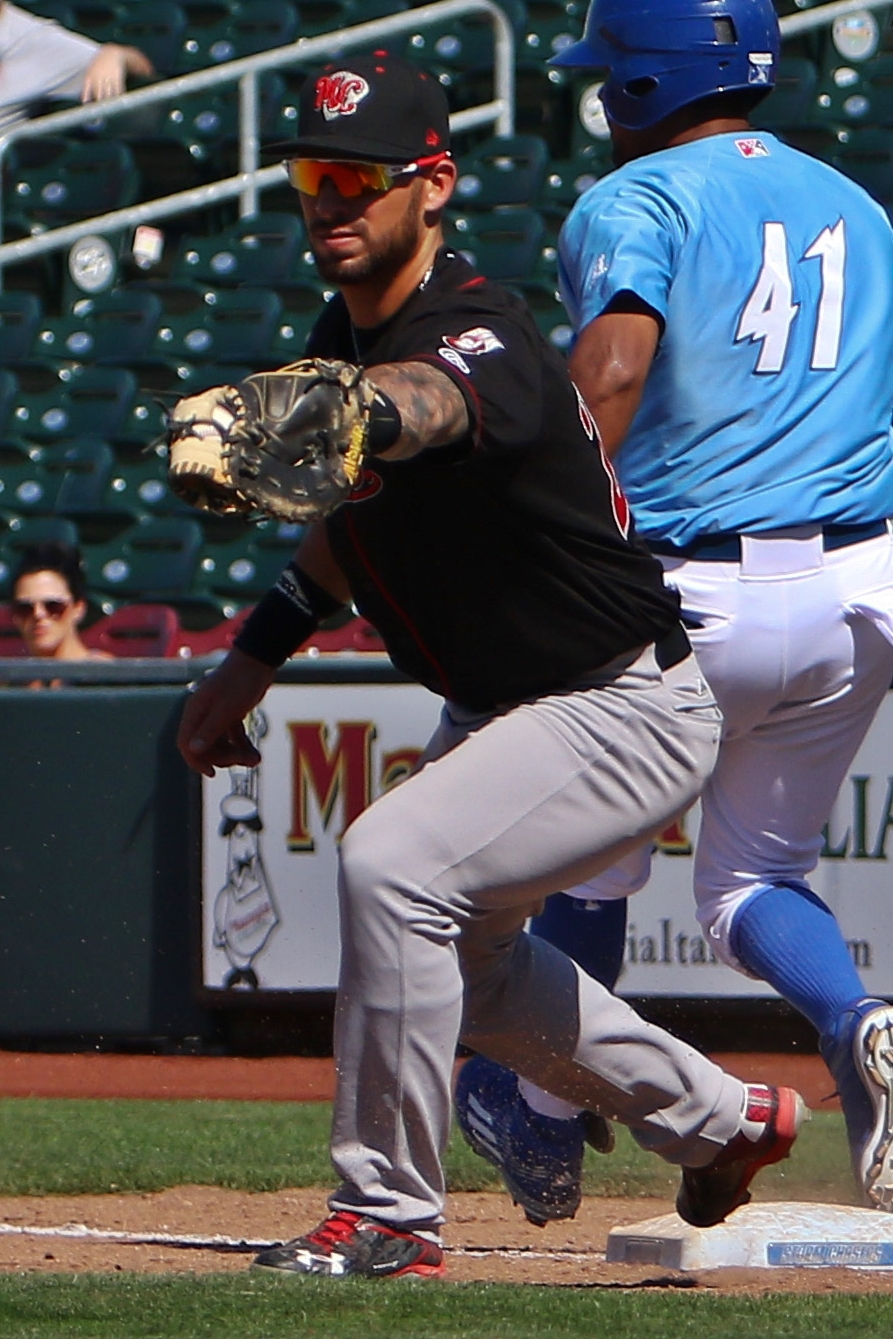
Rangel Ravelo, first baseman (2015–2016)

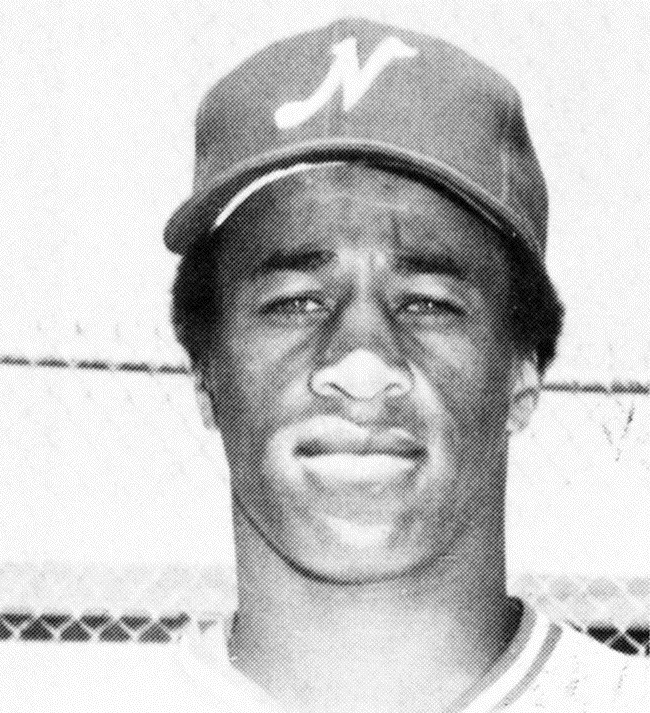
Gary Redus, outfielder (1979)

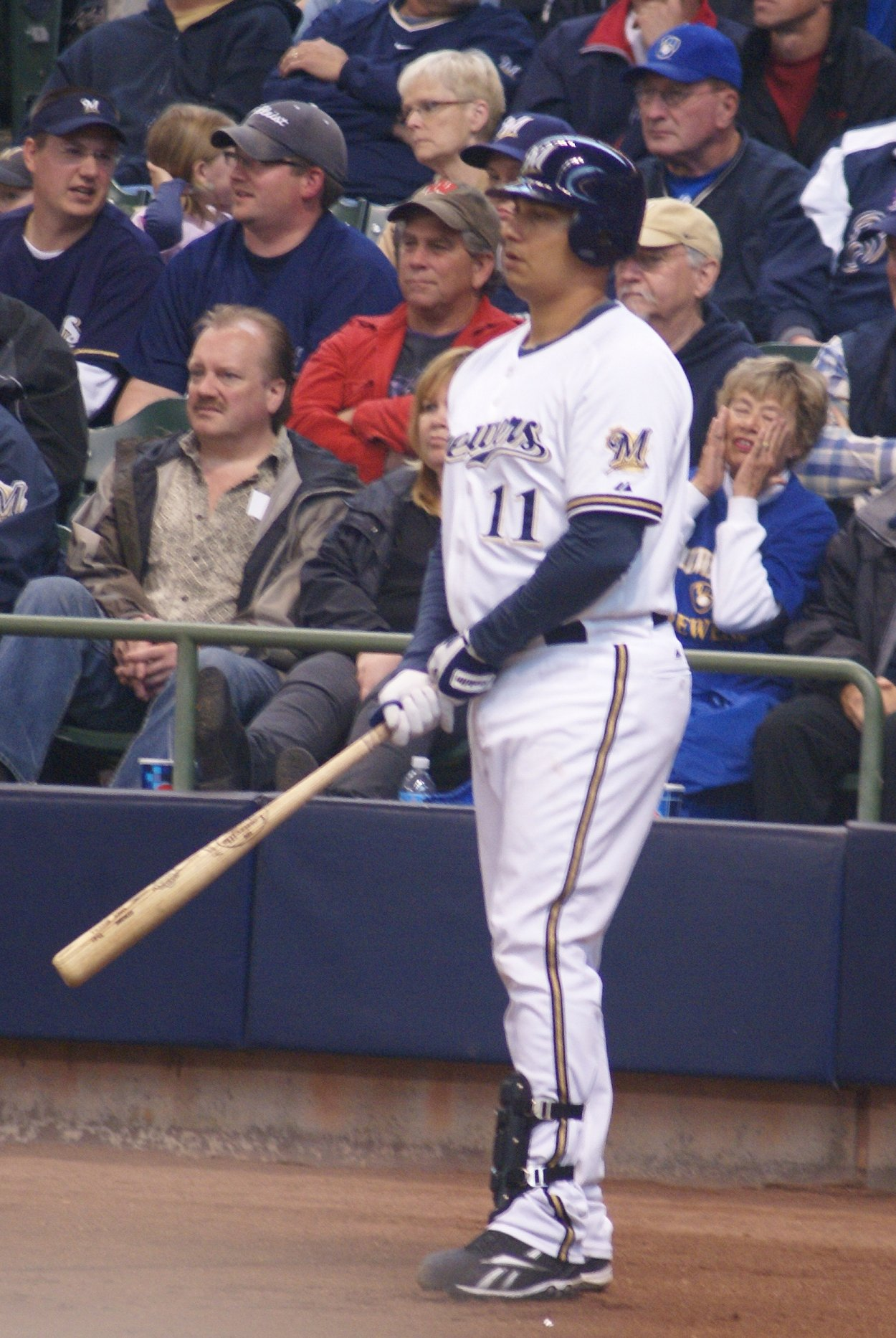
Mike Rivera, catcher (2005–2007, 2009, 2011)

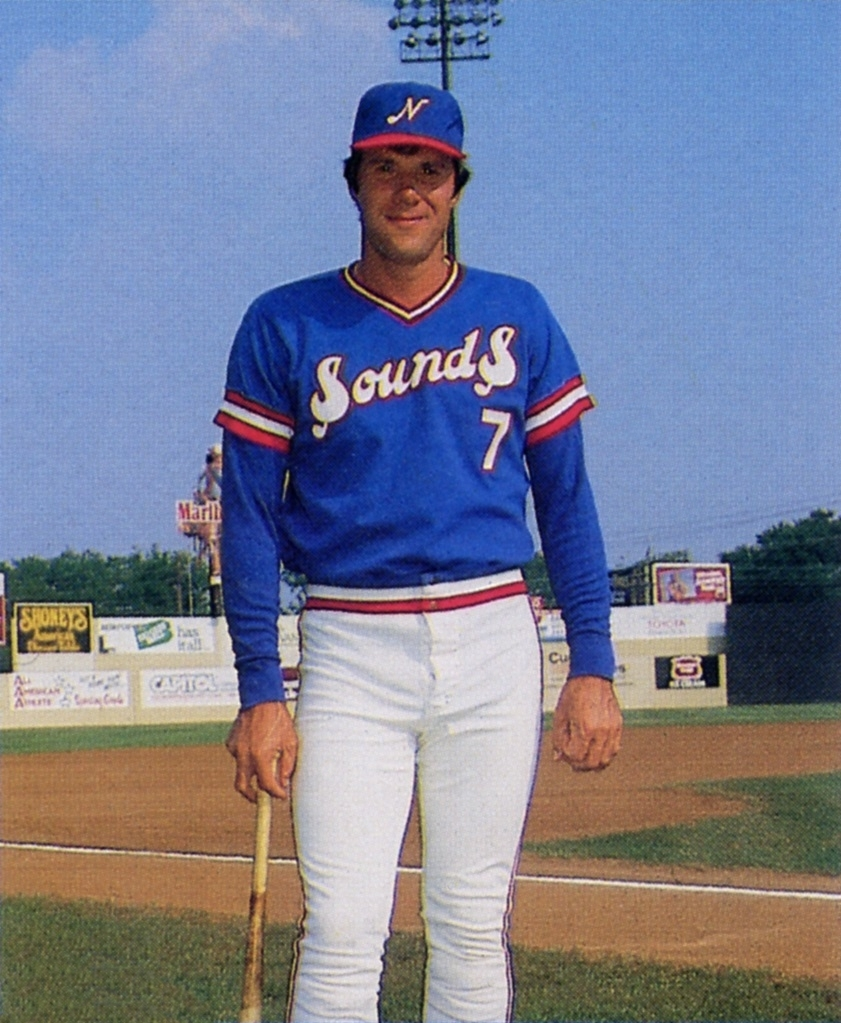
Leon Roberts, outfielder (1985)

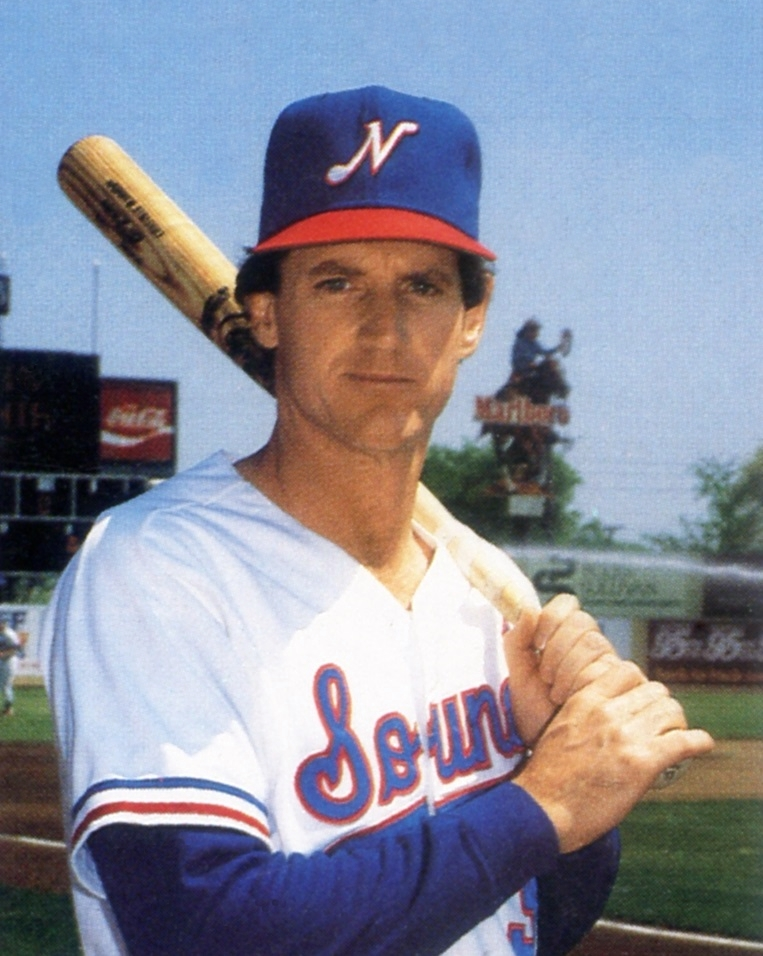
Ron Roenicke, outfielder (1988)

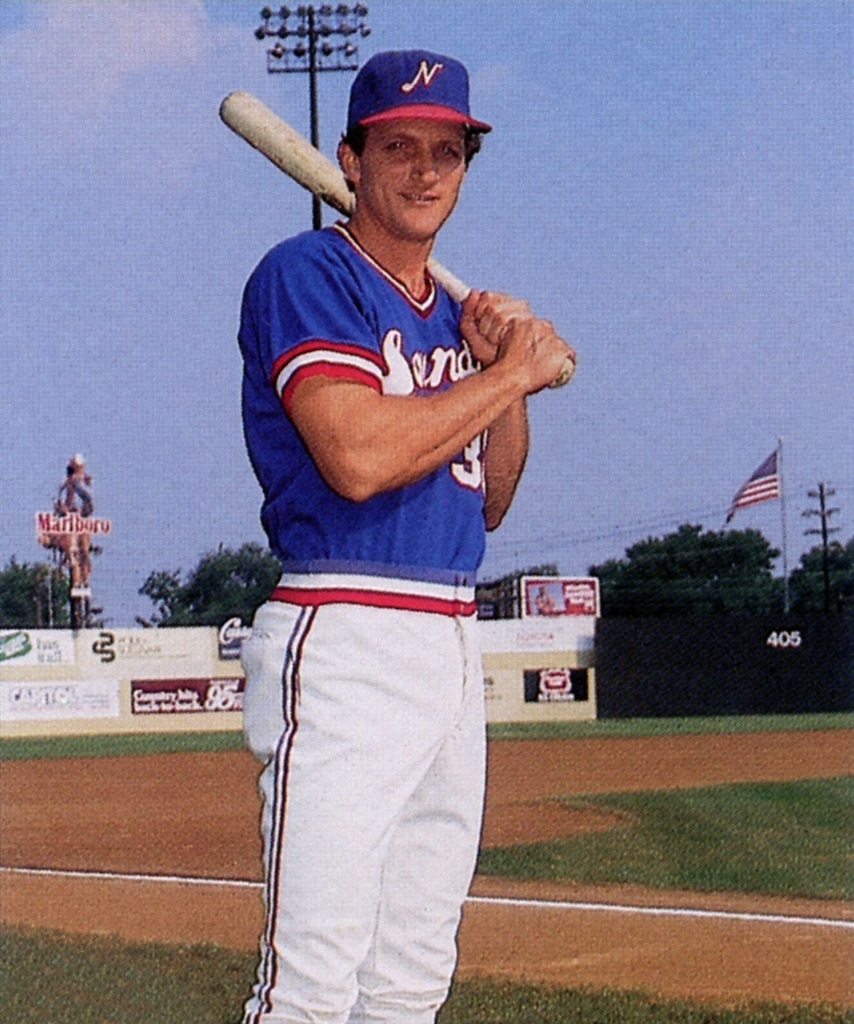
Gene Roof, outfielder (1986)

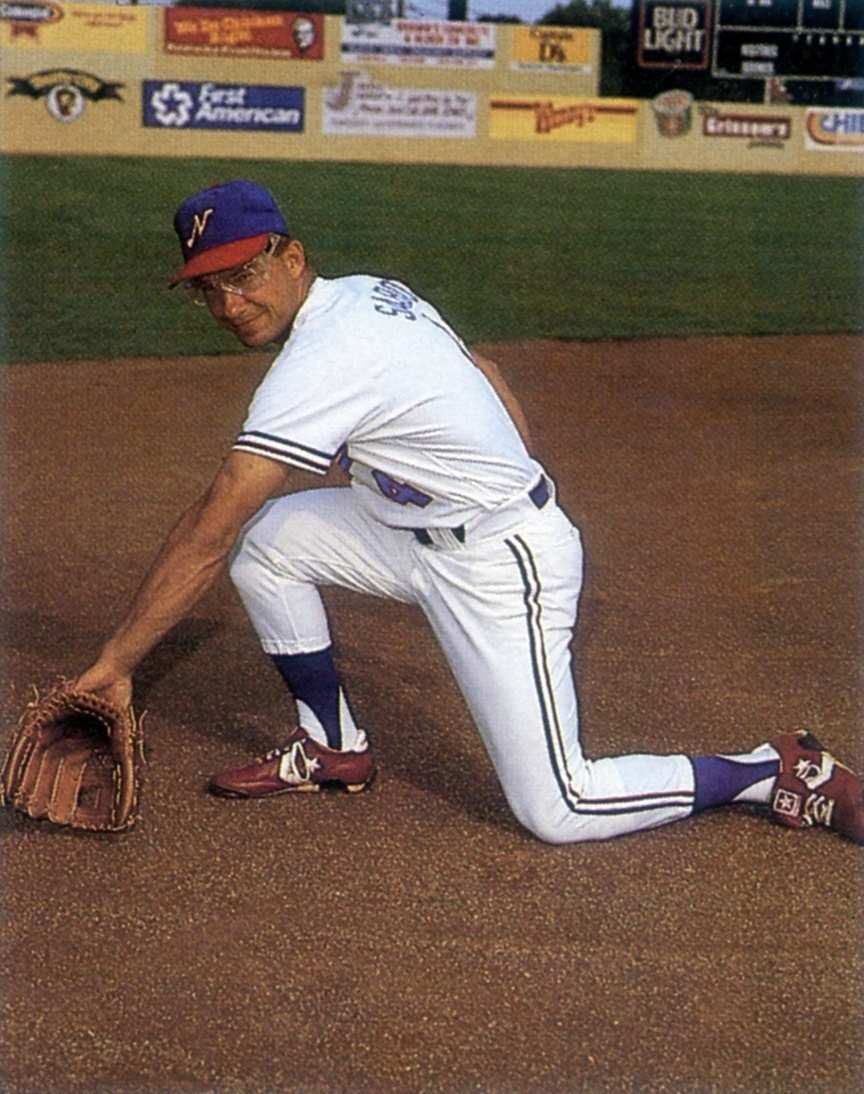
Chris Sabo, third baseman (1987, 1989, 1992)

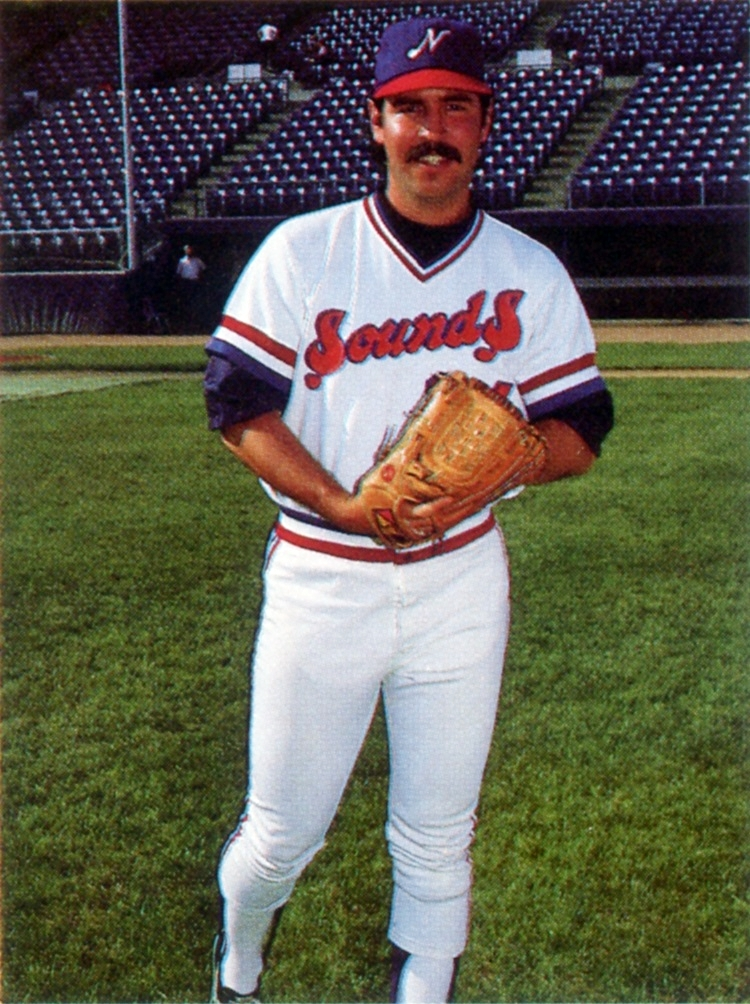
Steve Shirley, pitcher (1985)

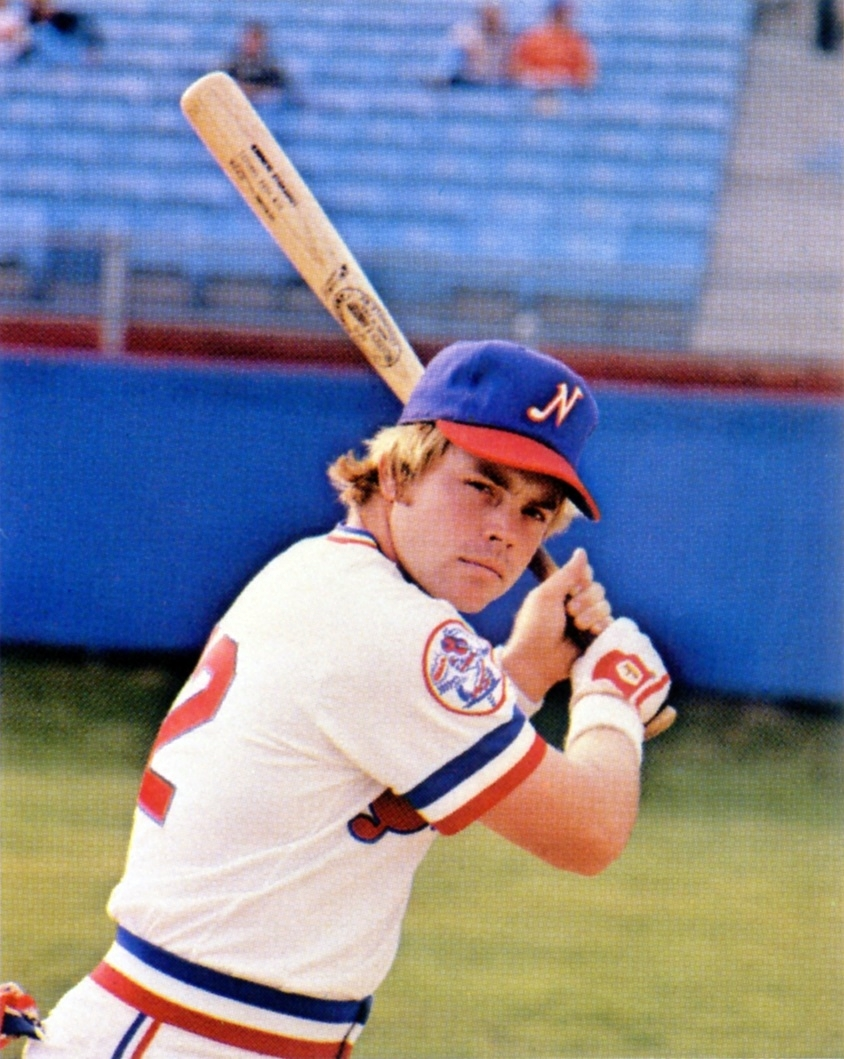
Buck Showalter, first baseman (1980–1983)

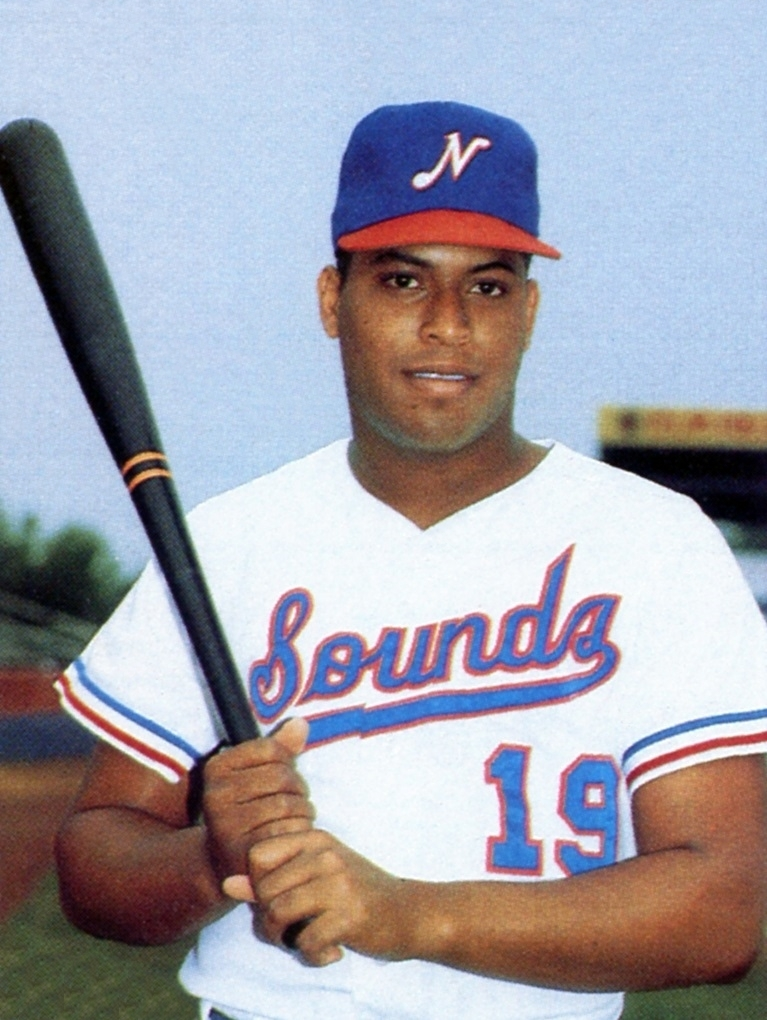
Candy Sierra, pitcher (1988)

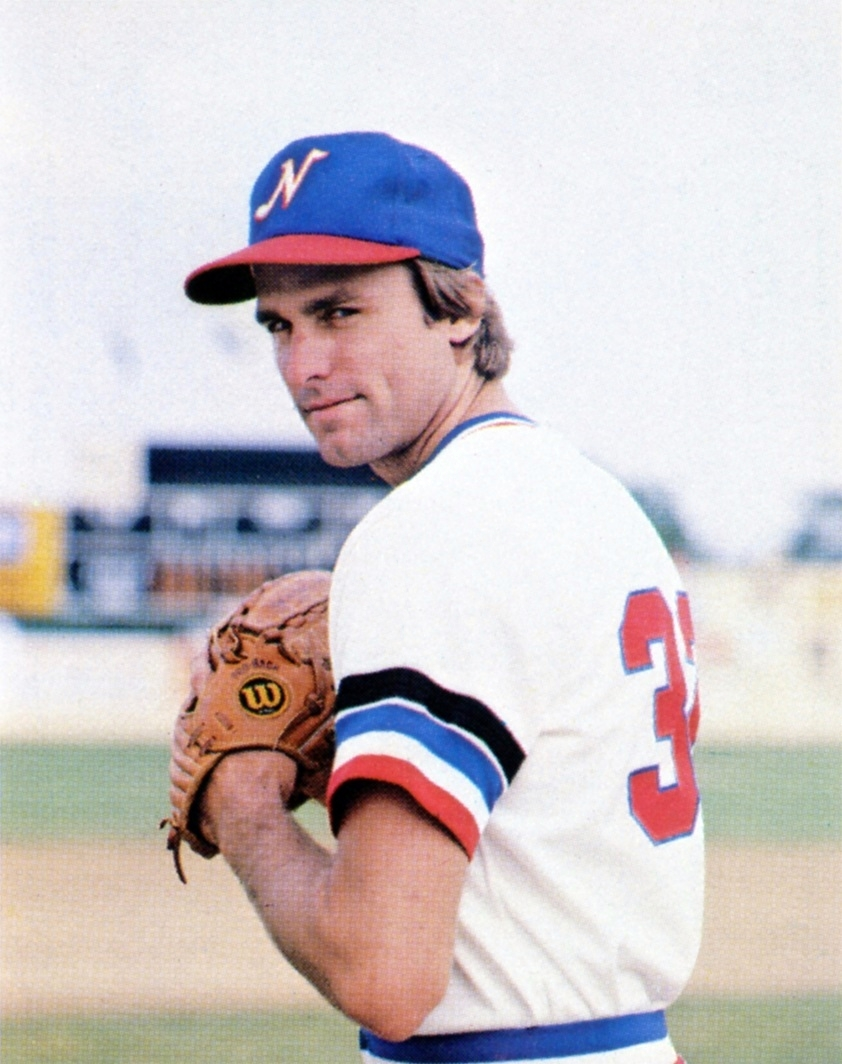
Roger Slagle, pitcher (1980–1982)

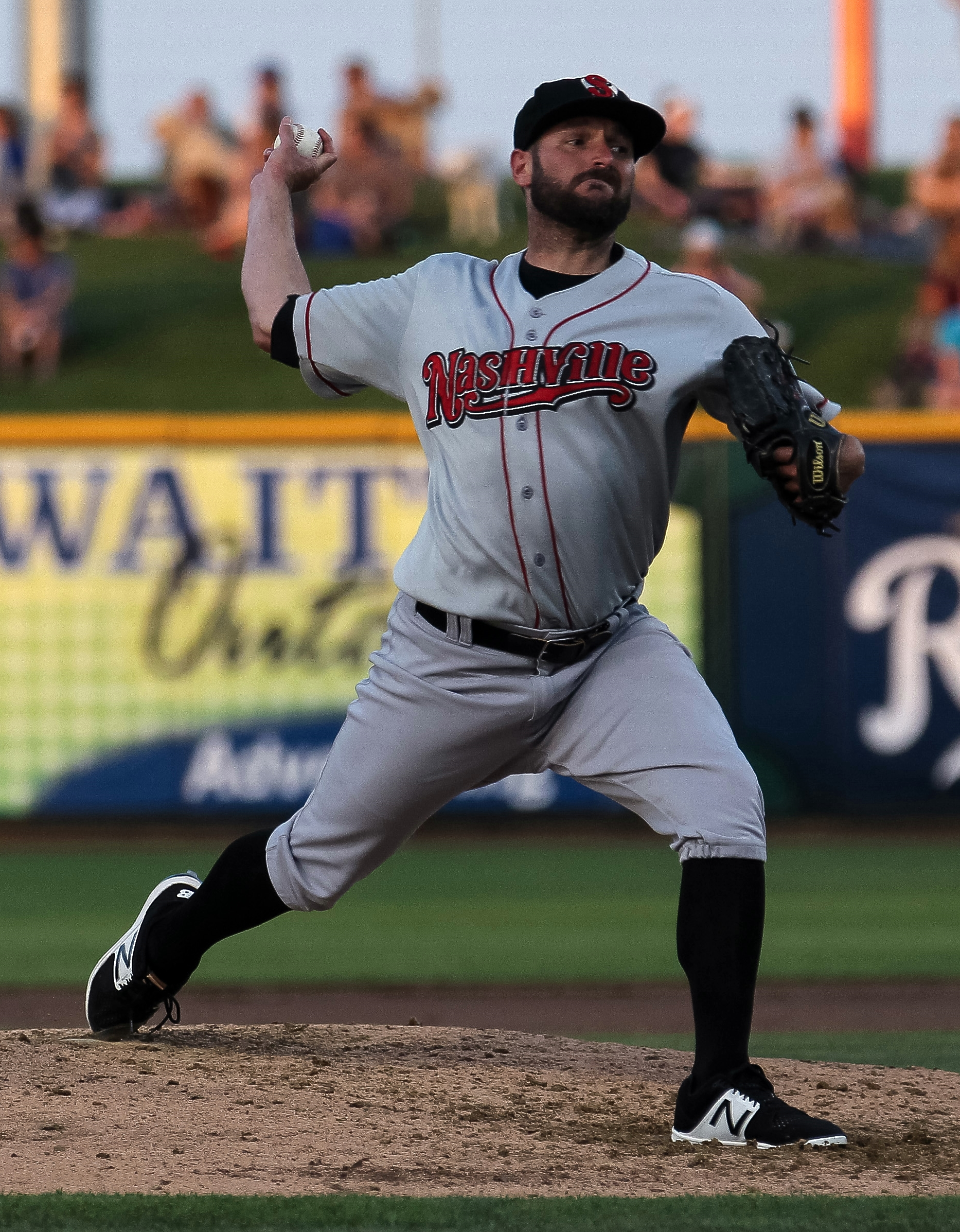
Chris Smith, pitcher (2009–2010, 2016–2017)

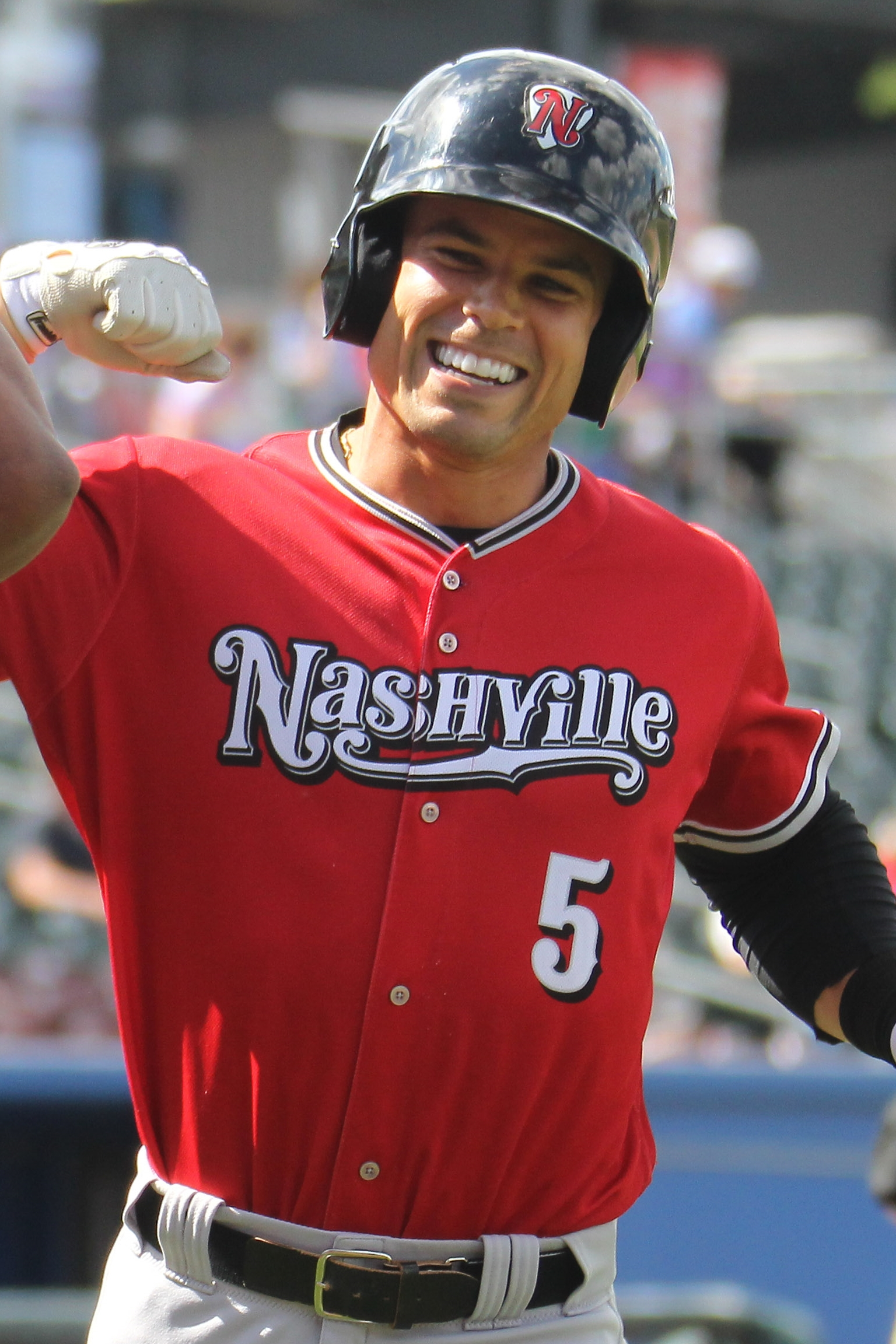
Jake Smolinski, center fielder (2015–2018)

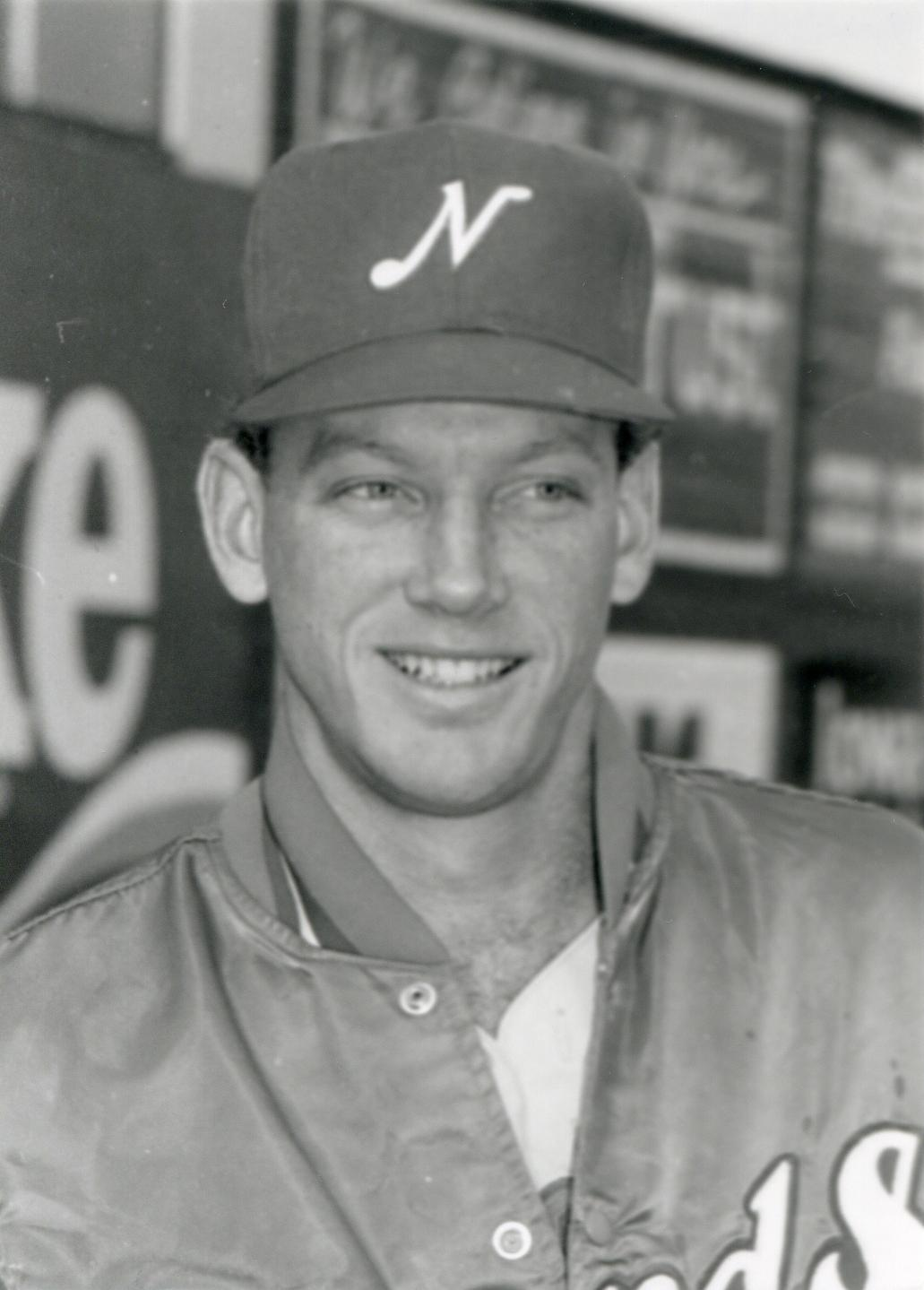
Van Snider, outfielder (1988–1989)

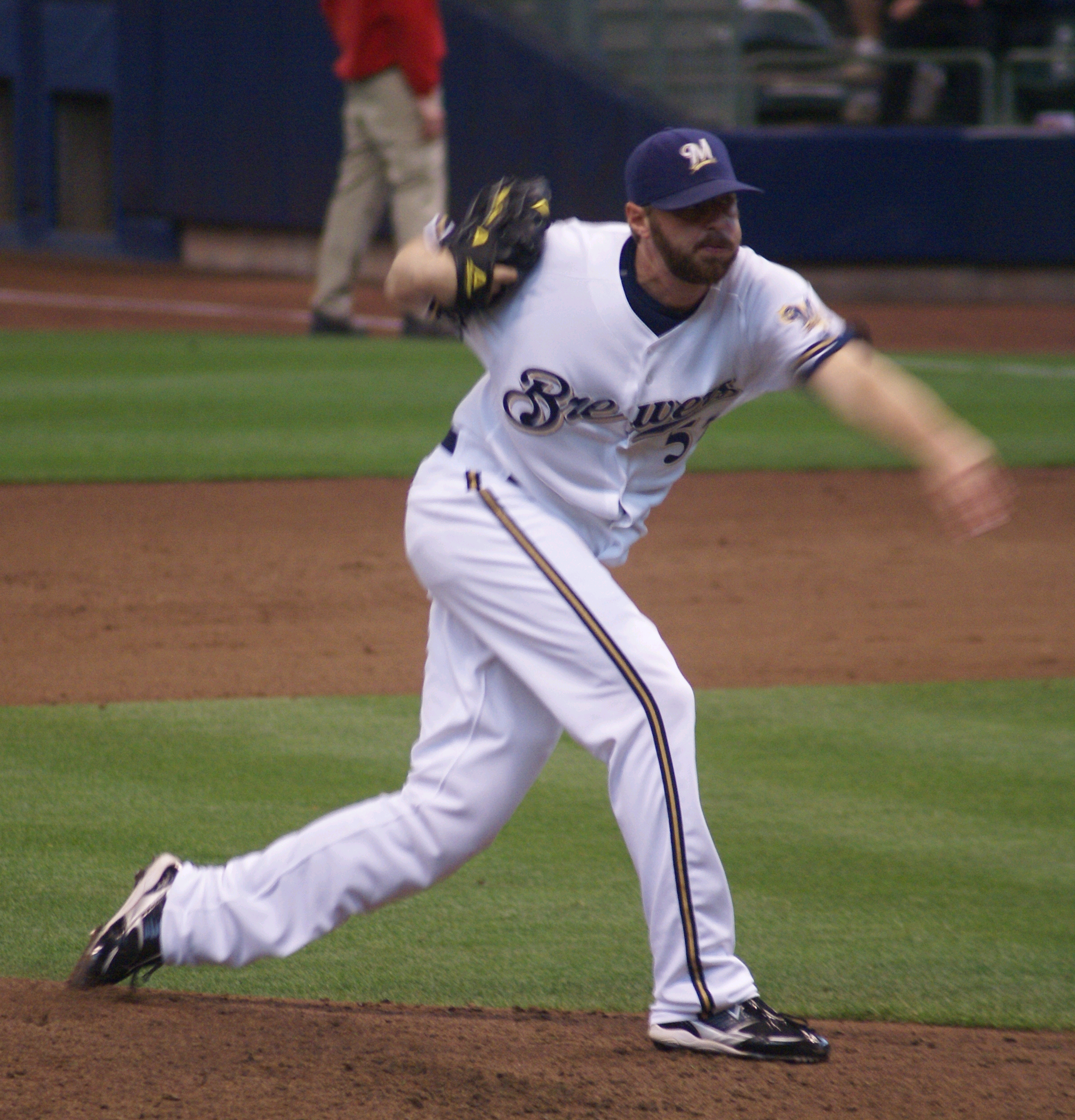
Mitch Stetter, pitcher (2005–2008, 2010–2012)

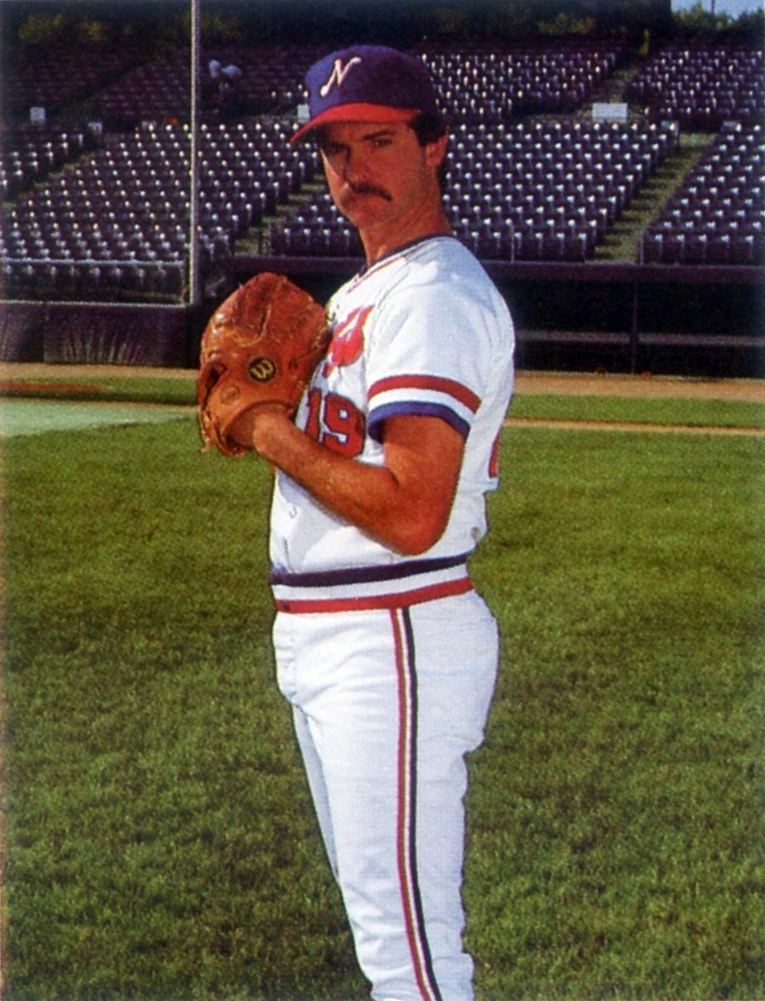
Bob Stoddard, pitcher (1985)

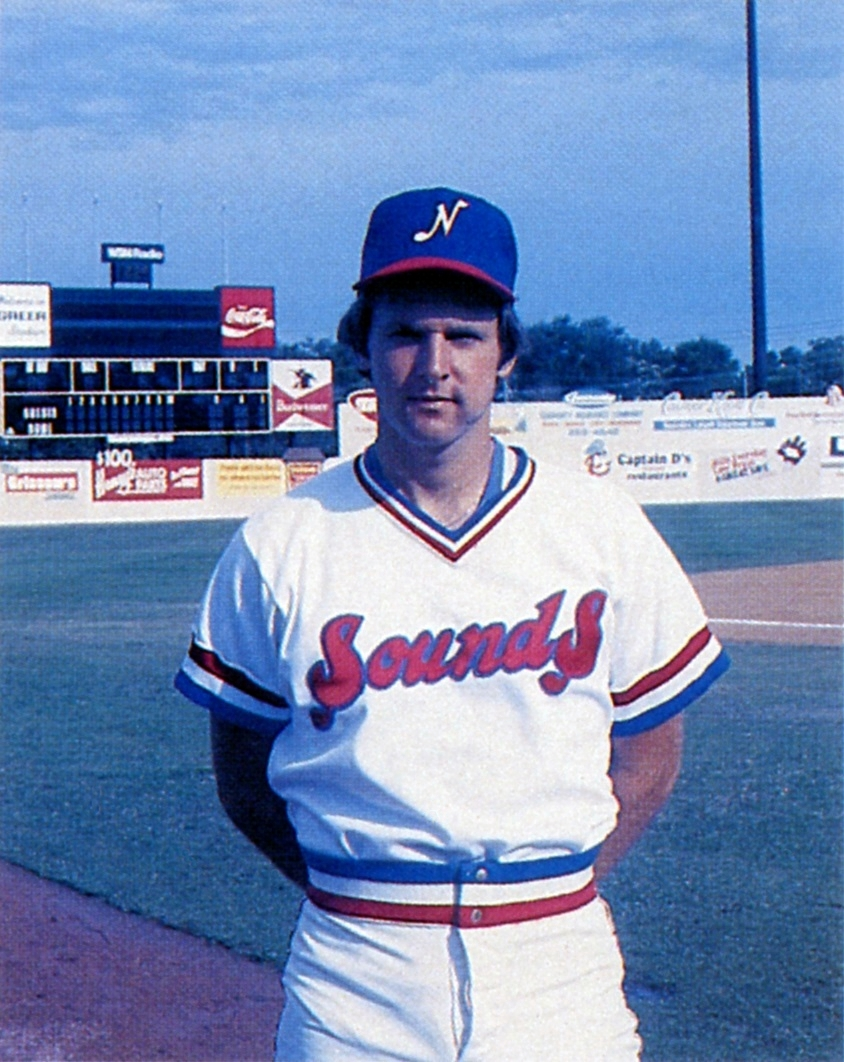
Bob Sykes, pitcher (1982)

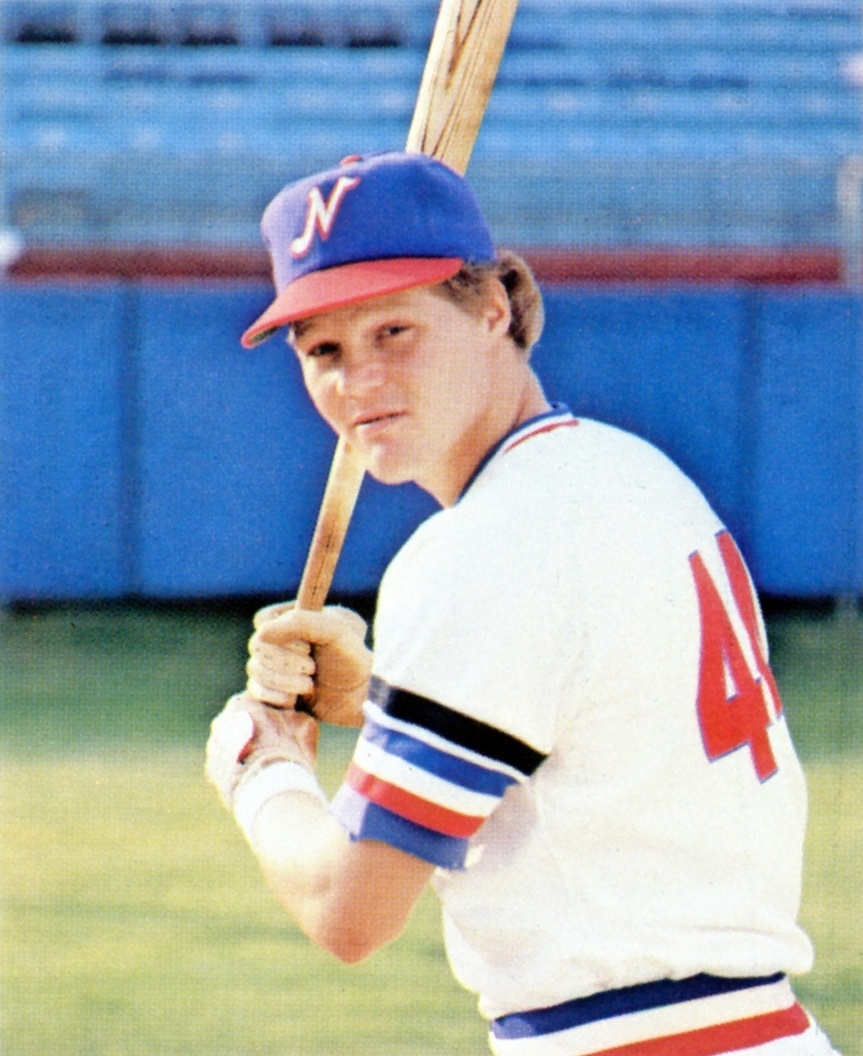
Pat Tabler, second baseman (1980)

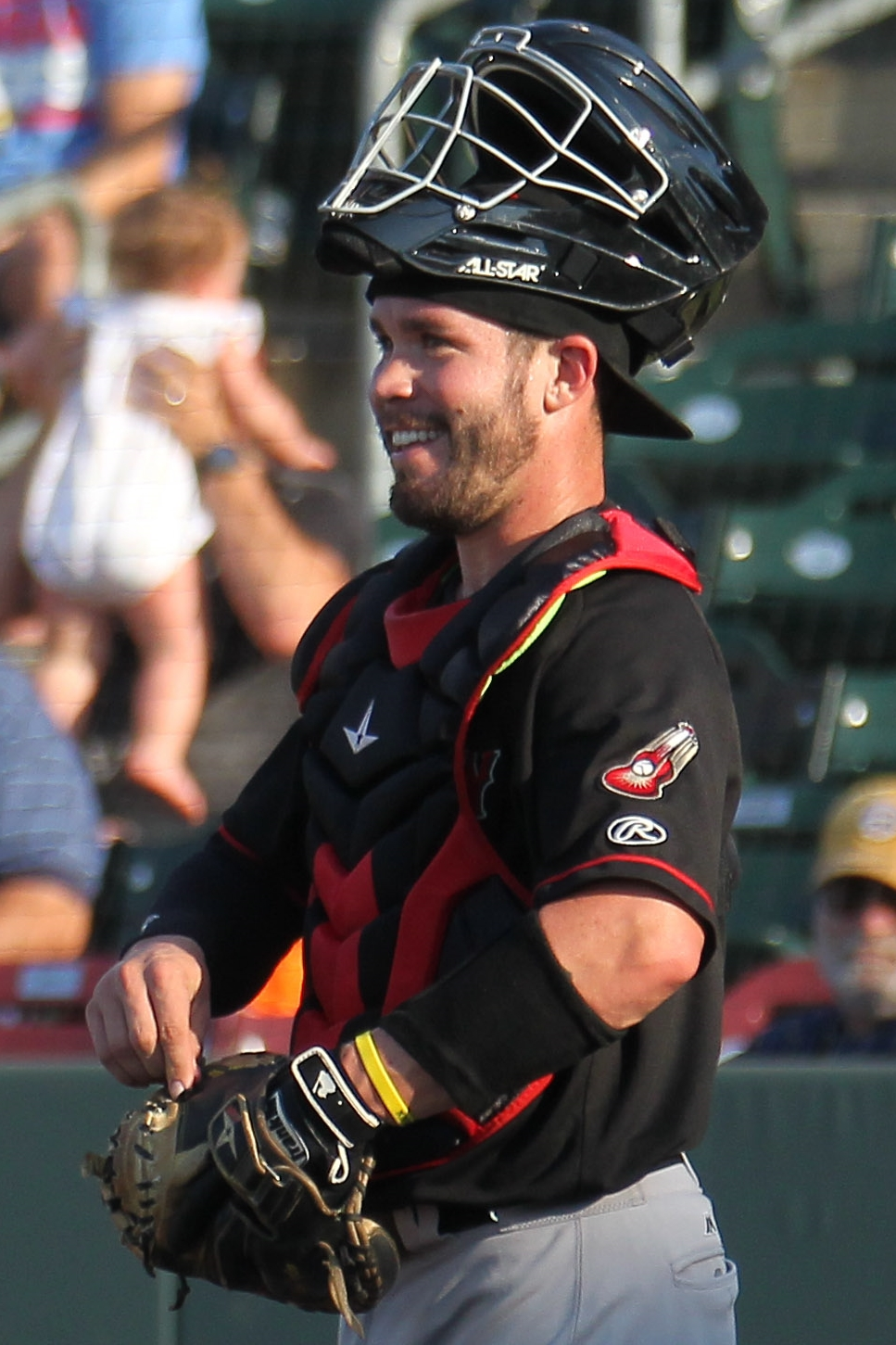
Beau Taylor, catcher (2017–2018)

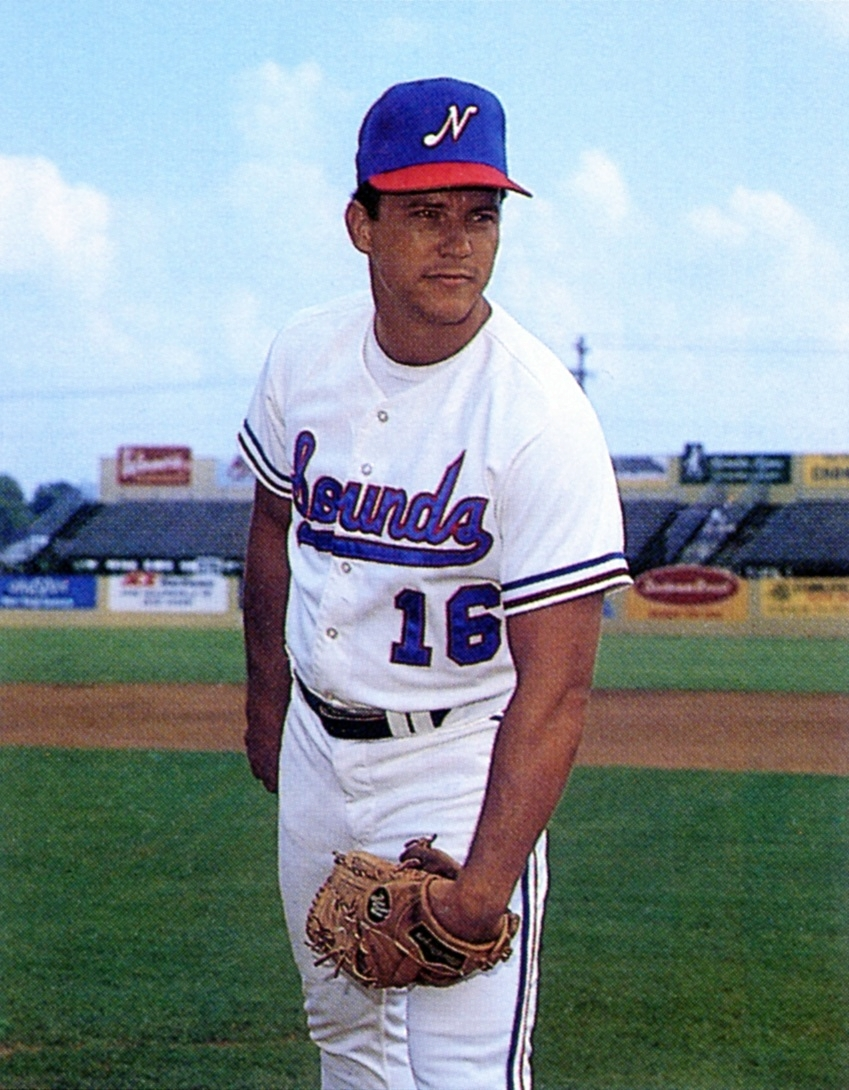
Scott Terry, pitcher (1987)

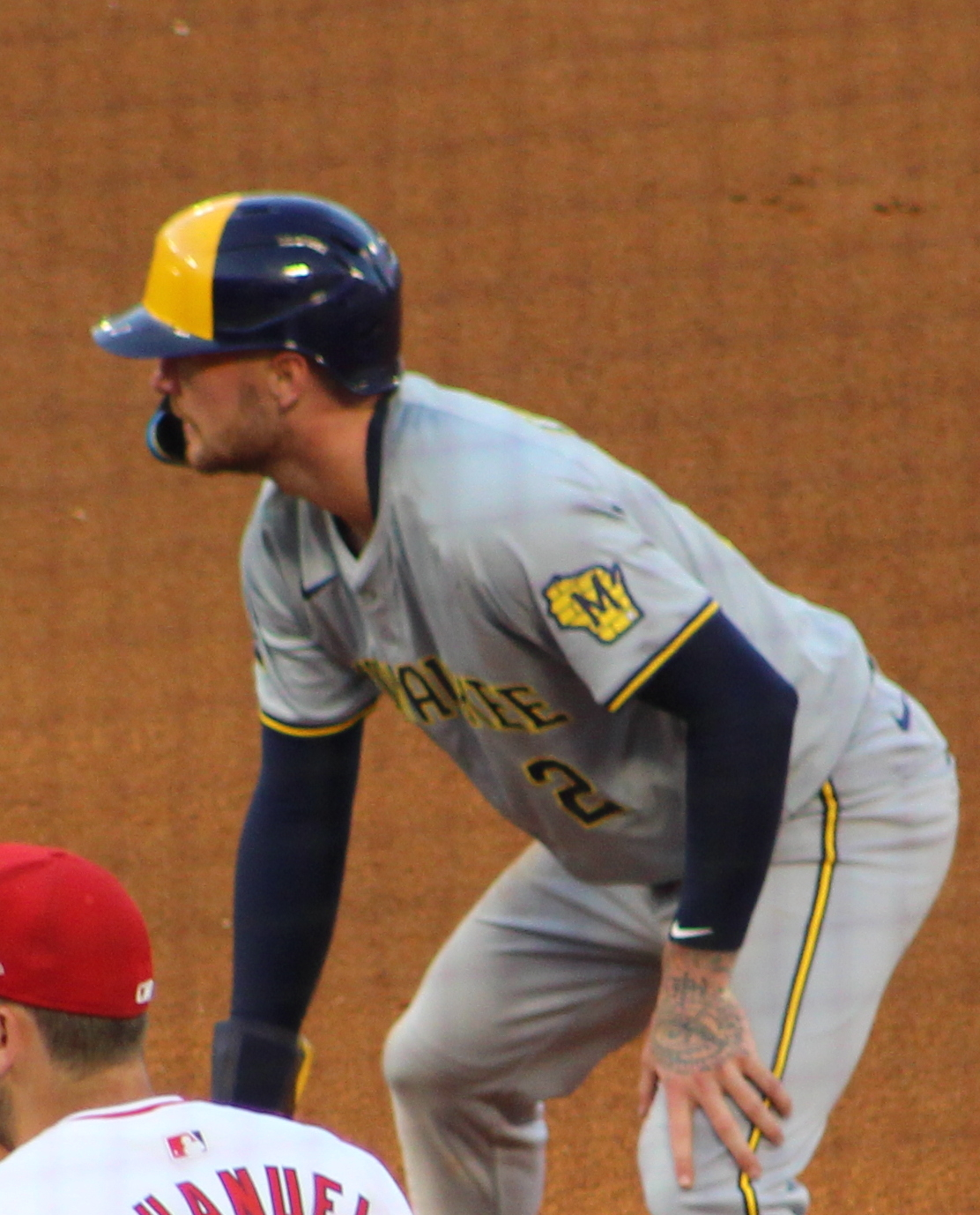
Brice Turang, shortstop (2021–2023)

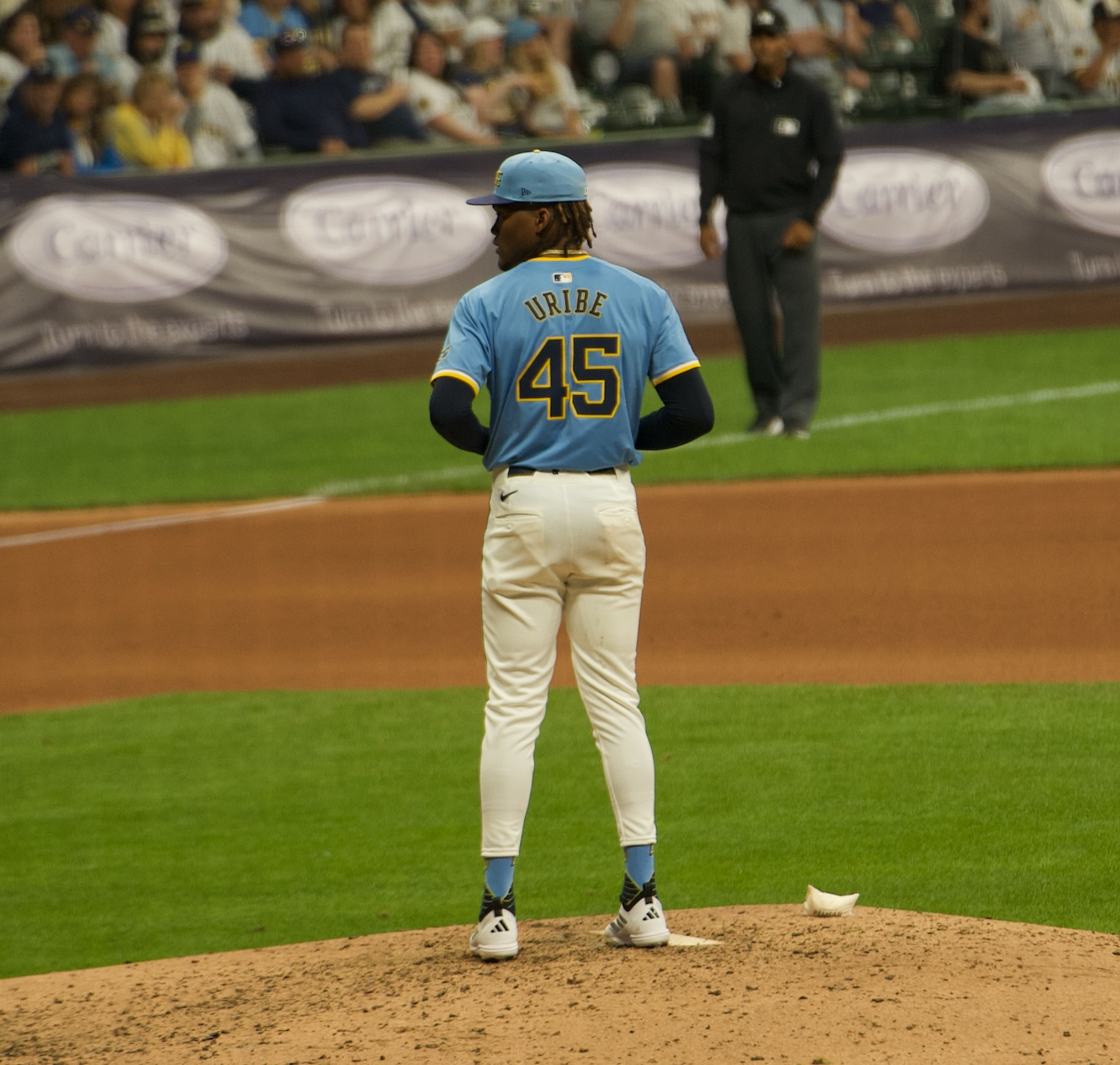
Abner Uribe, pitcher (2023–2024)

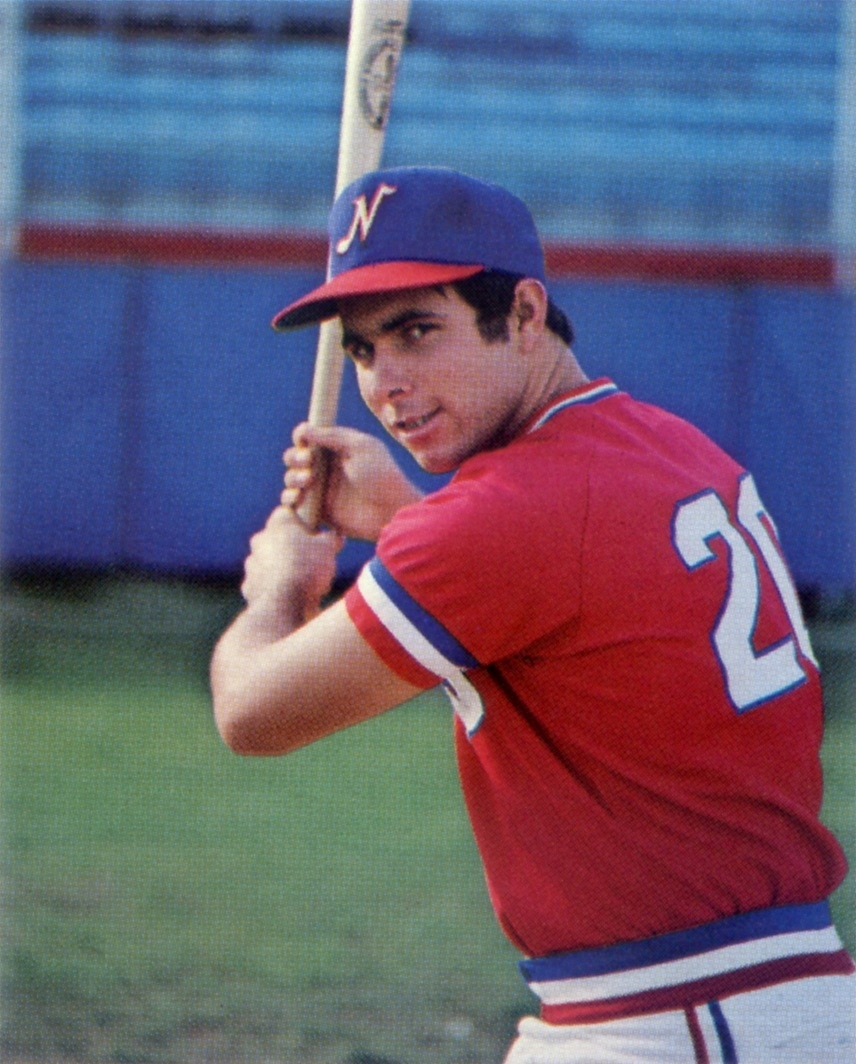
Dave Van Gorder, catcher (1978–1979)

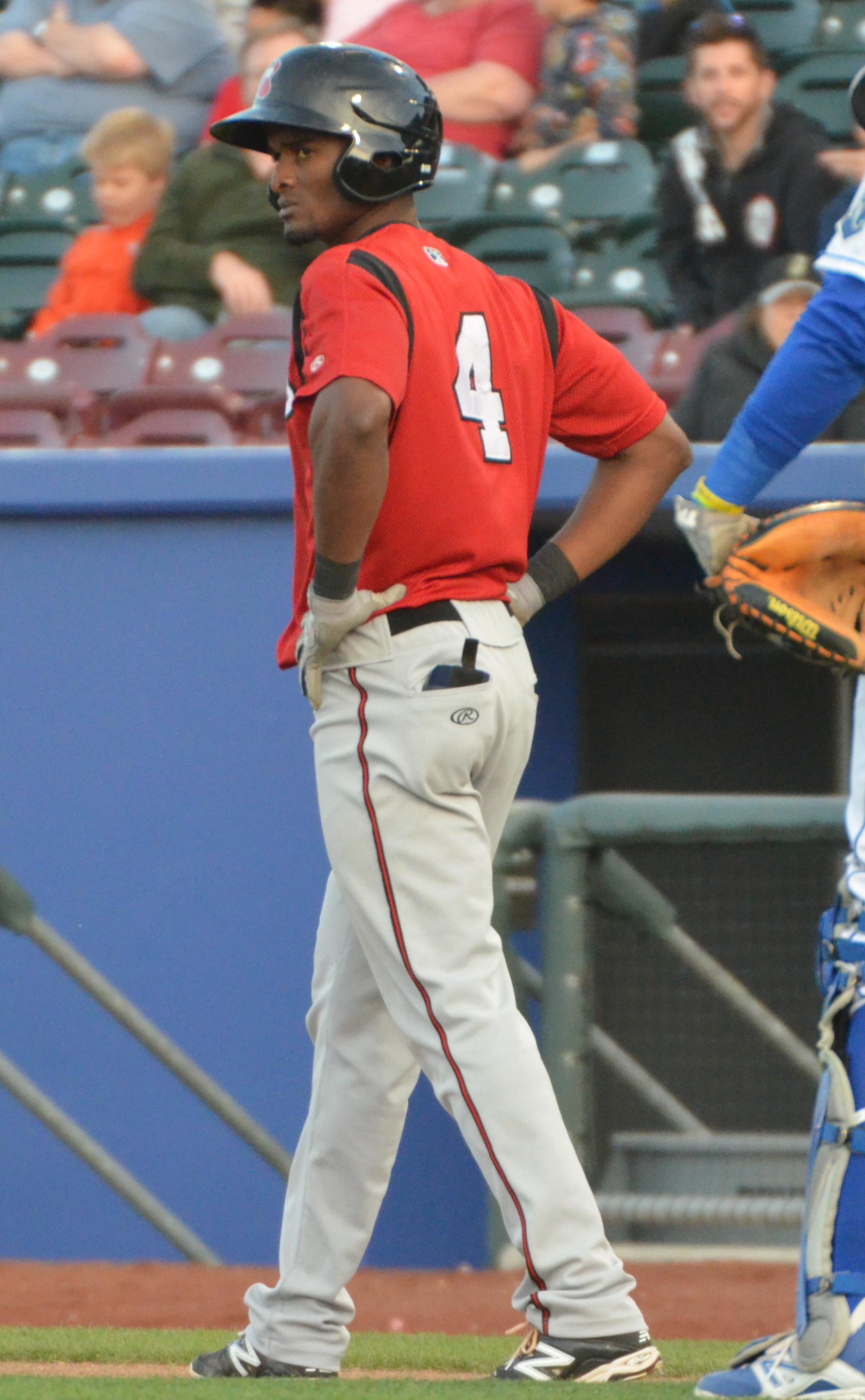
Eugenio Vélez, second baseman and left fielder (2013–2014)

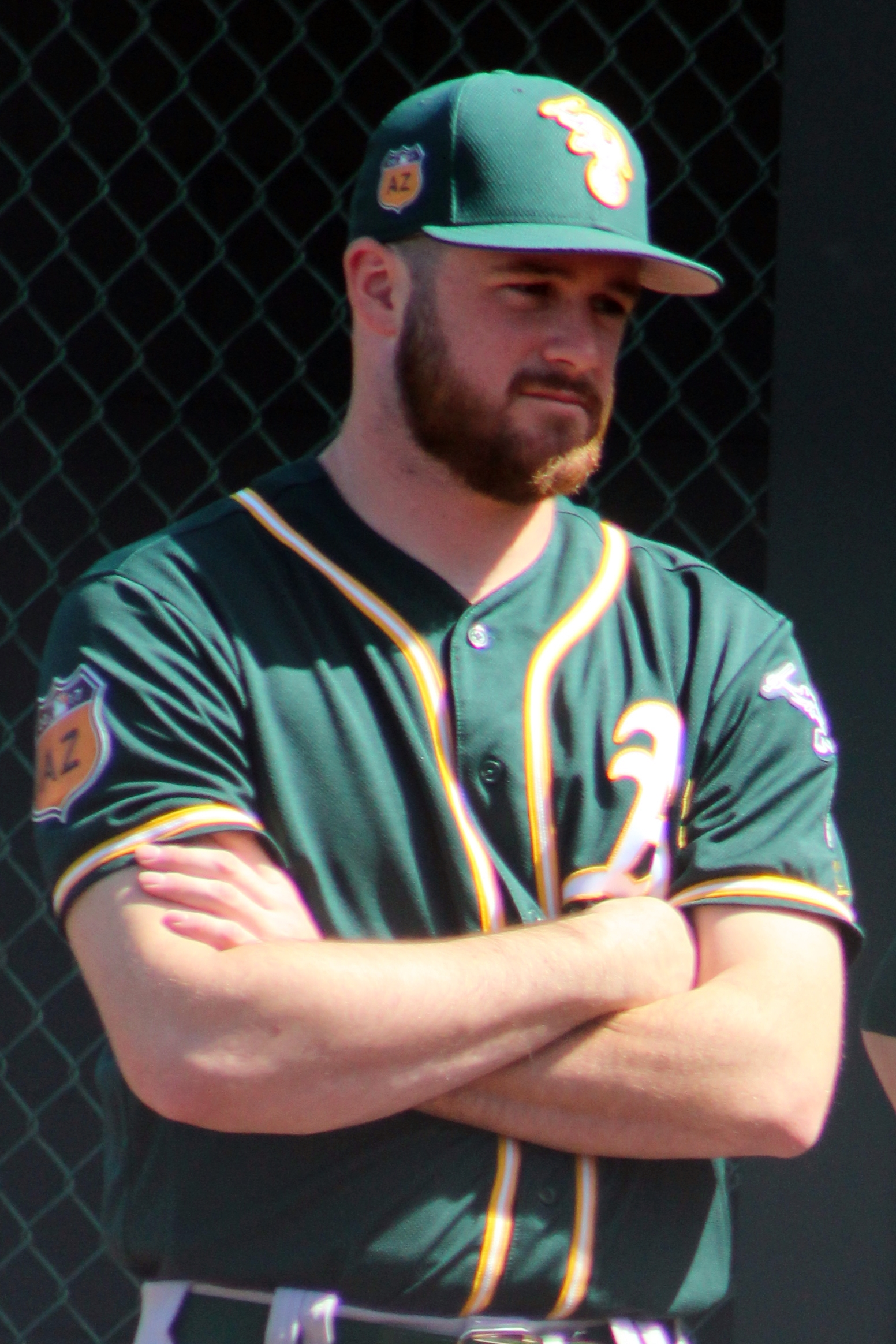
Bobby Wahl, pitcher (2016–2018, 2021)

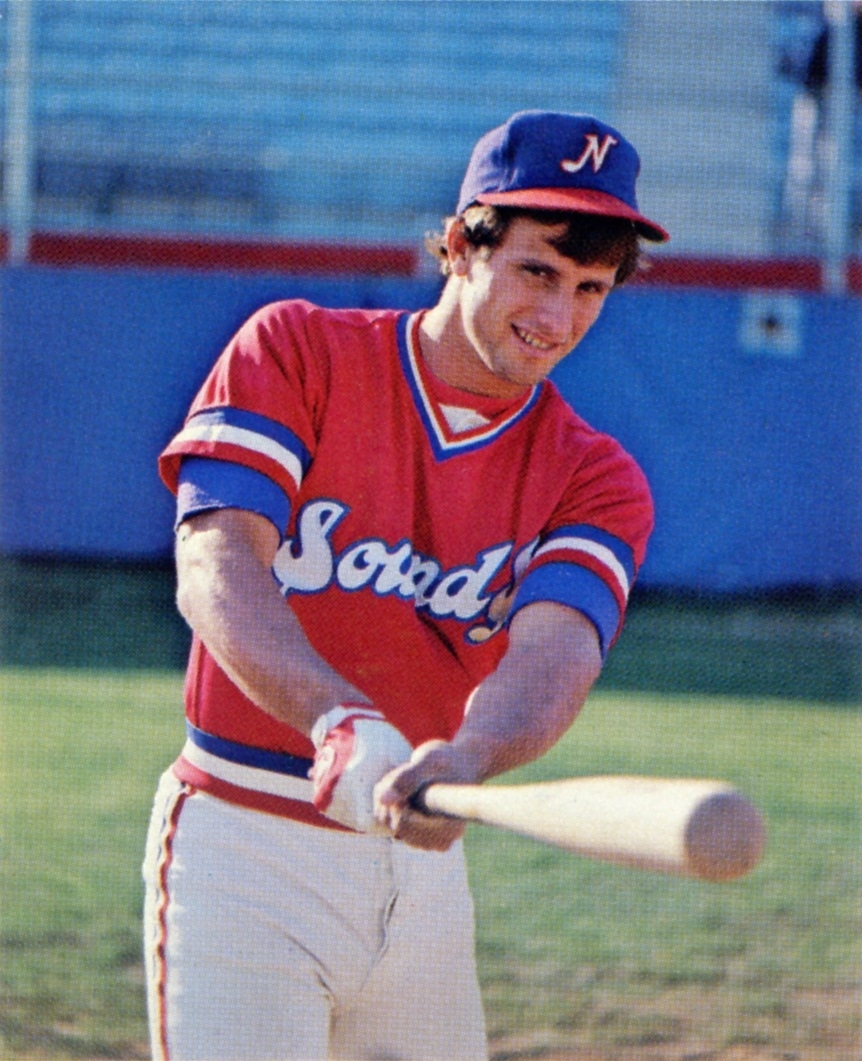
Duane Walker, outfielder (1978–1979)

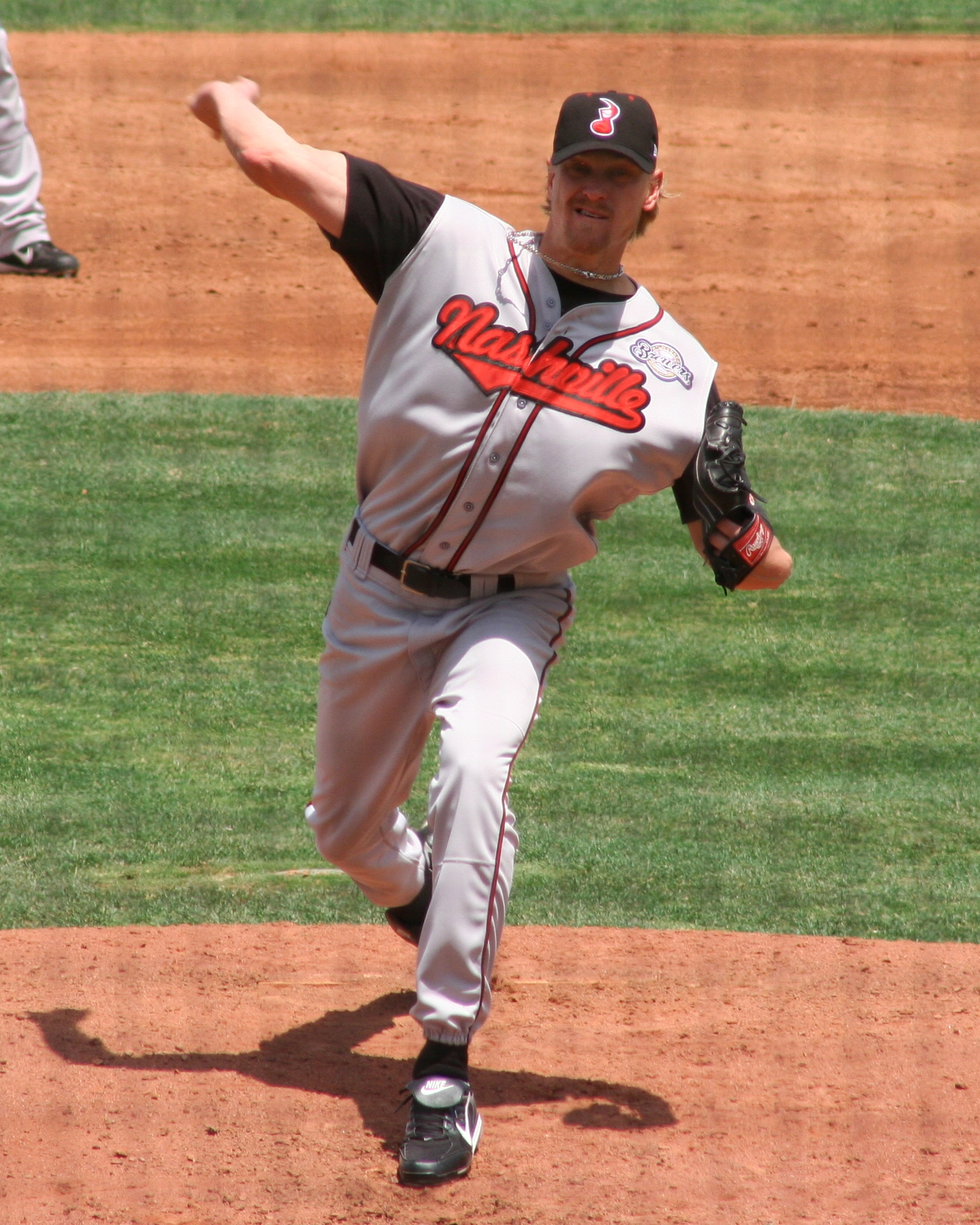
Jeff Weaver, pitcher (2008)

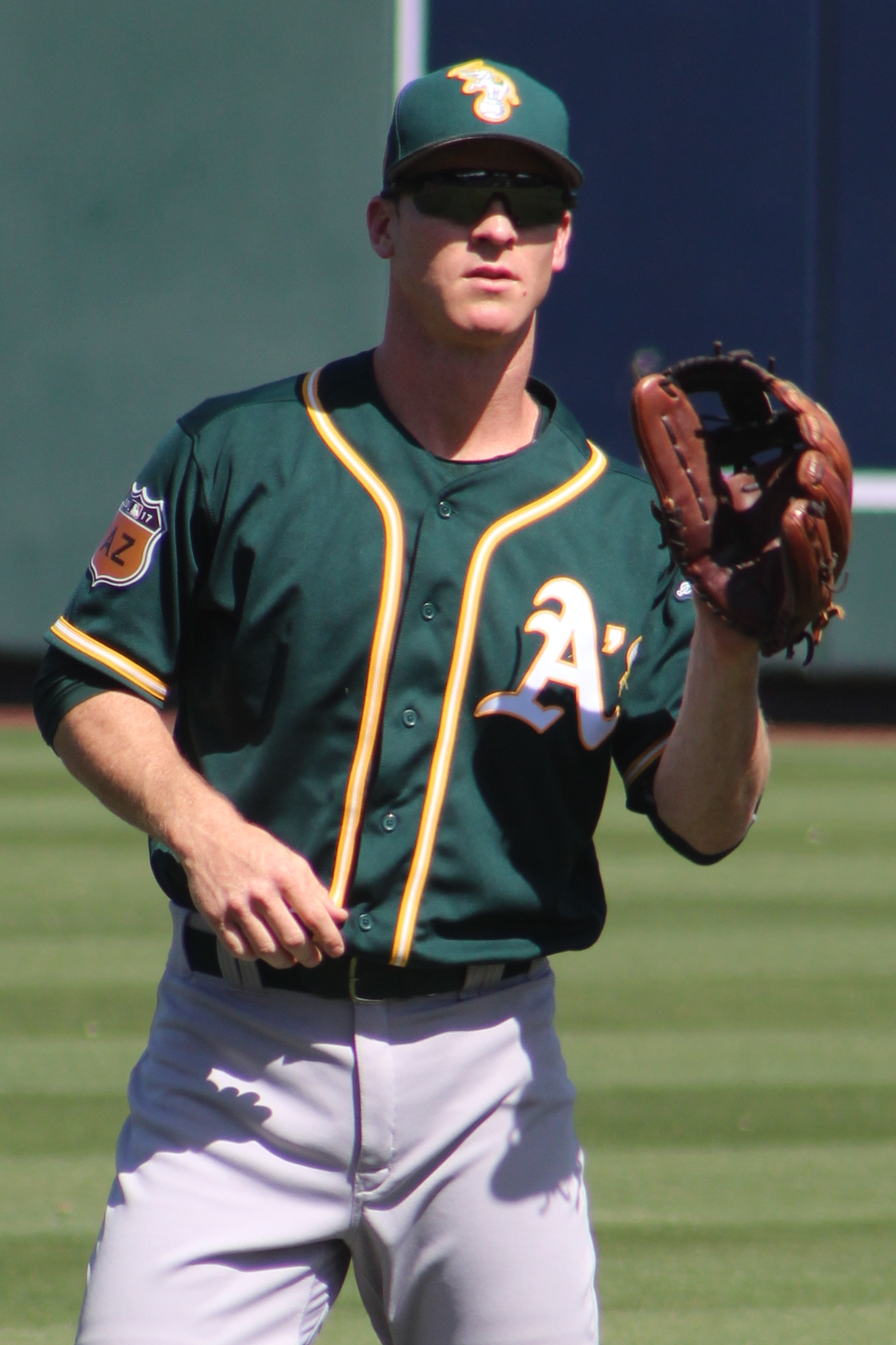
Joey Wendle, second baseman (2015–2017)

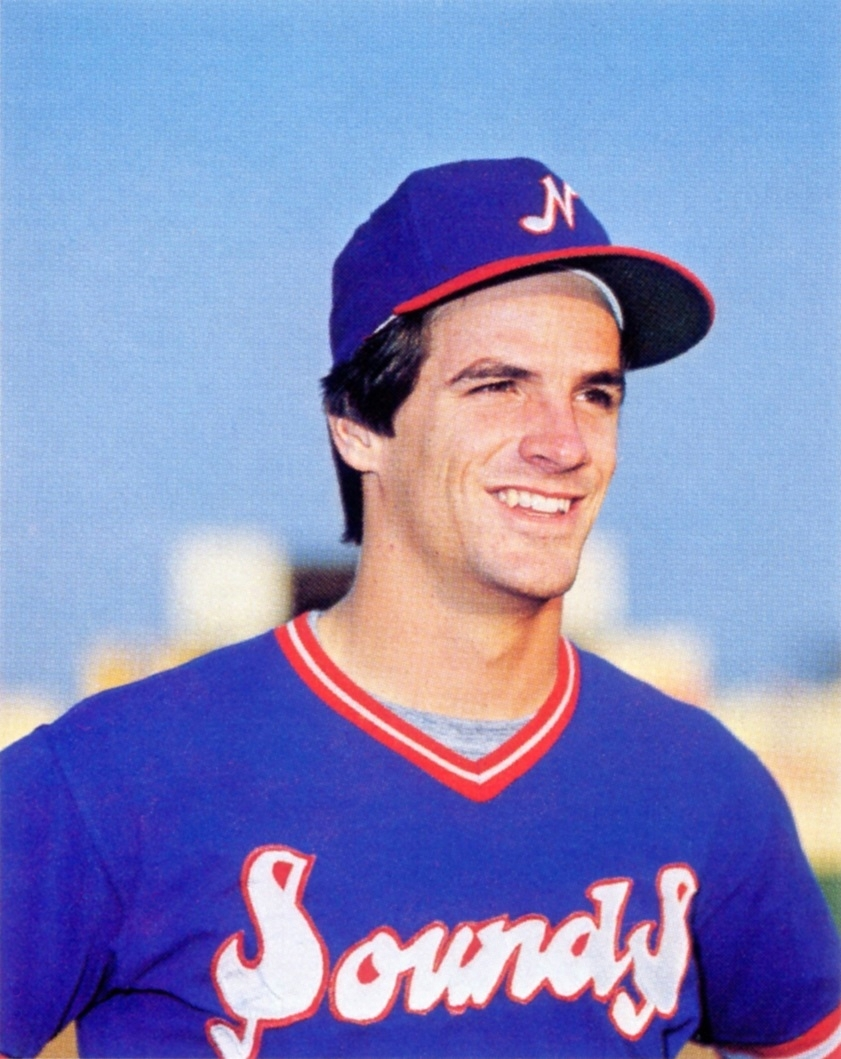
Jamie Werly, pitcher (1980–1981, 1983)

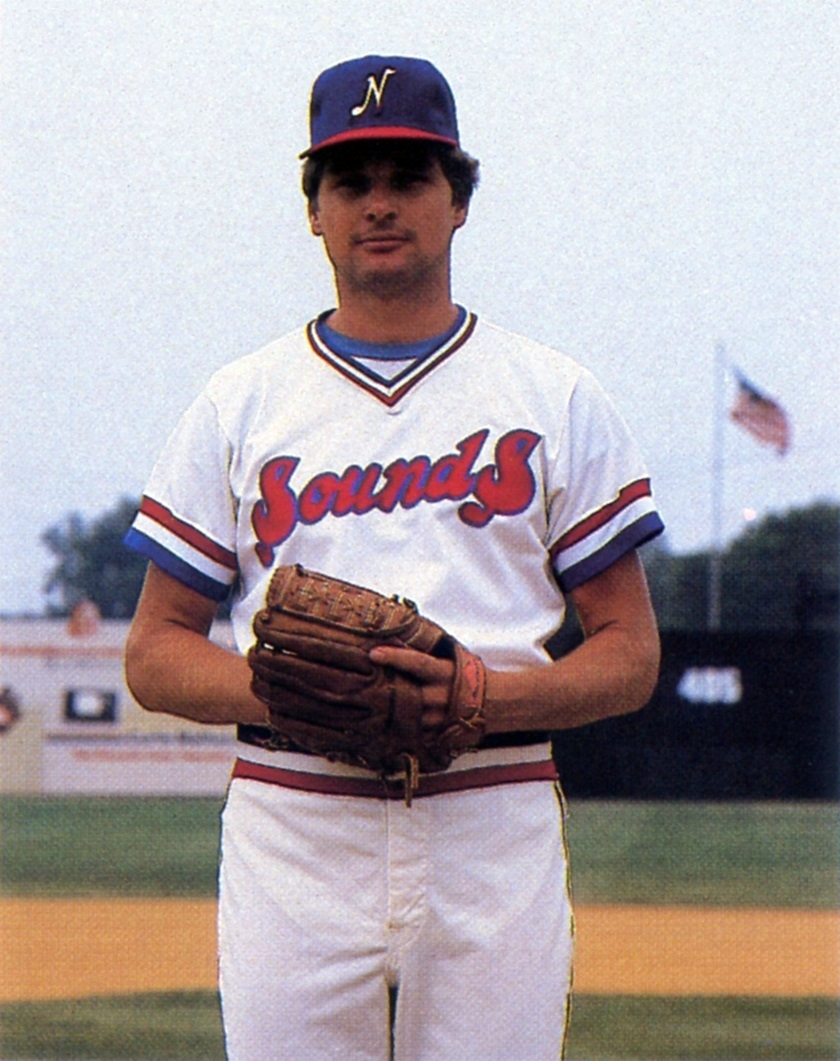
Stefan Wever, pitcher (1981–1982)

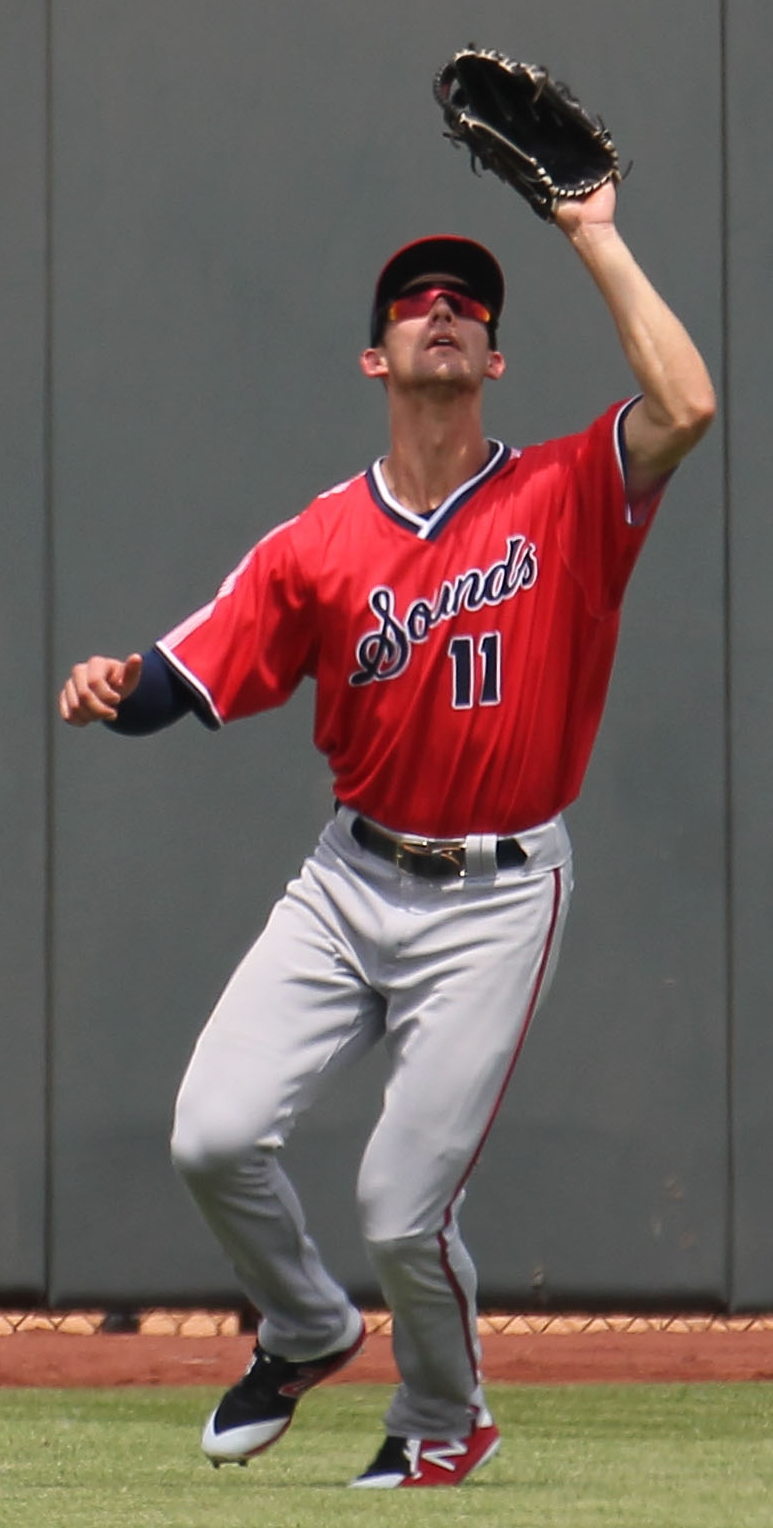
Eli White, shortstop (2019)

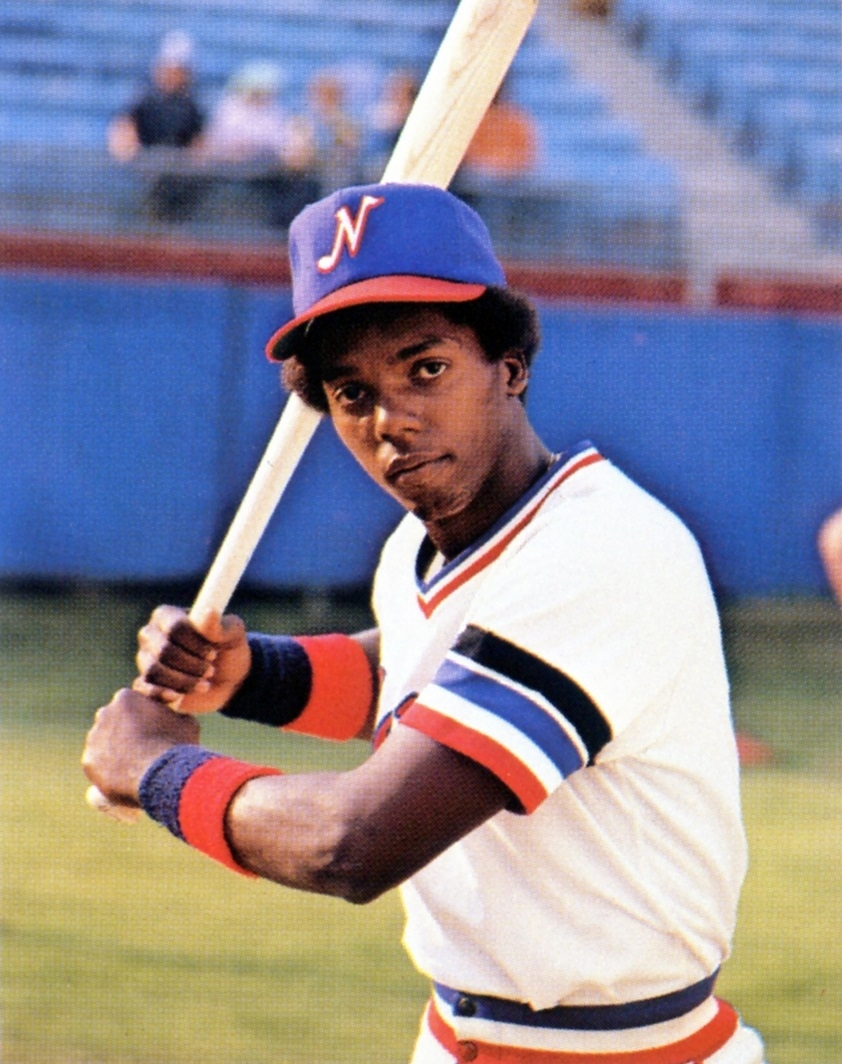
Ted Wilborn, outfielder (1980–1981, 1985)

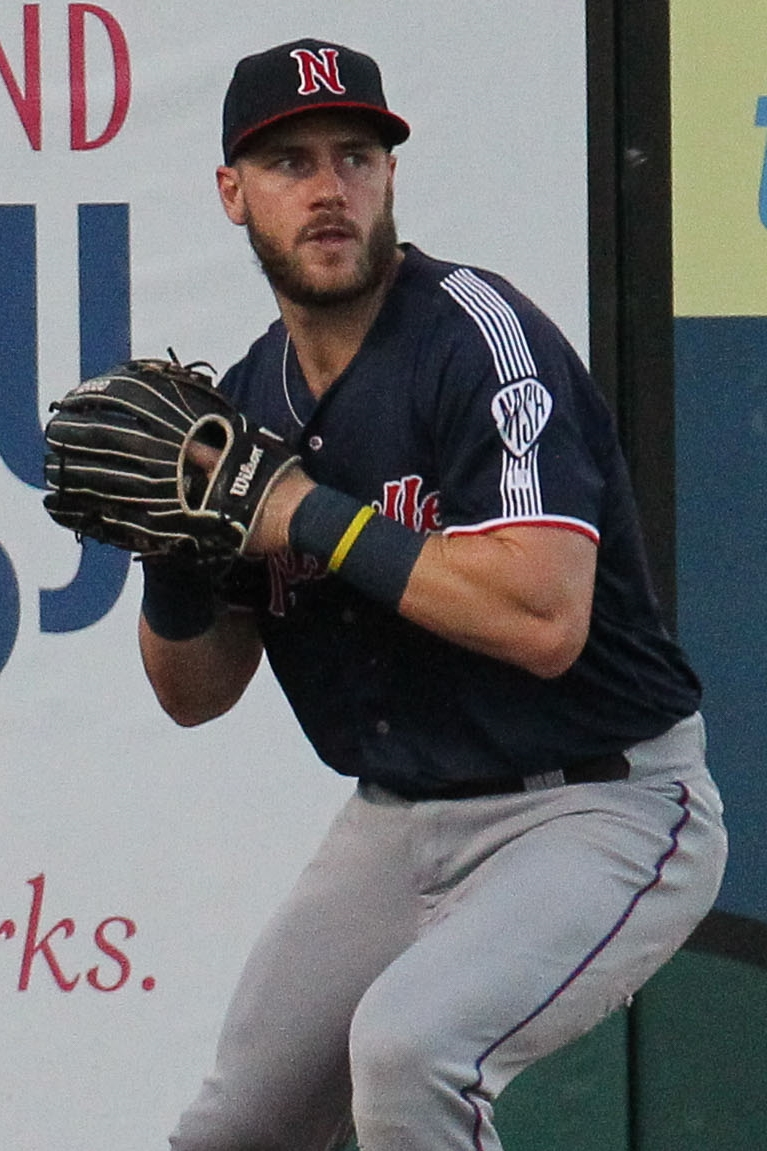
Patrick Wisdom, third baseman (2019)

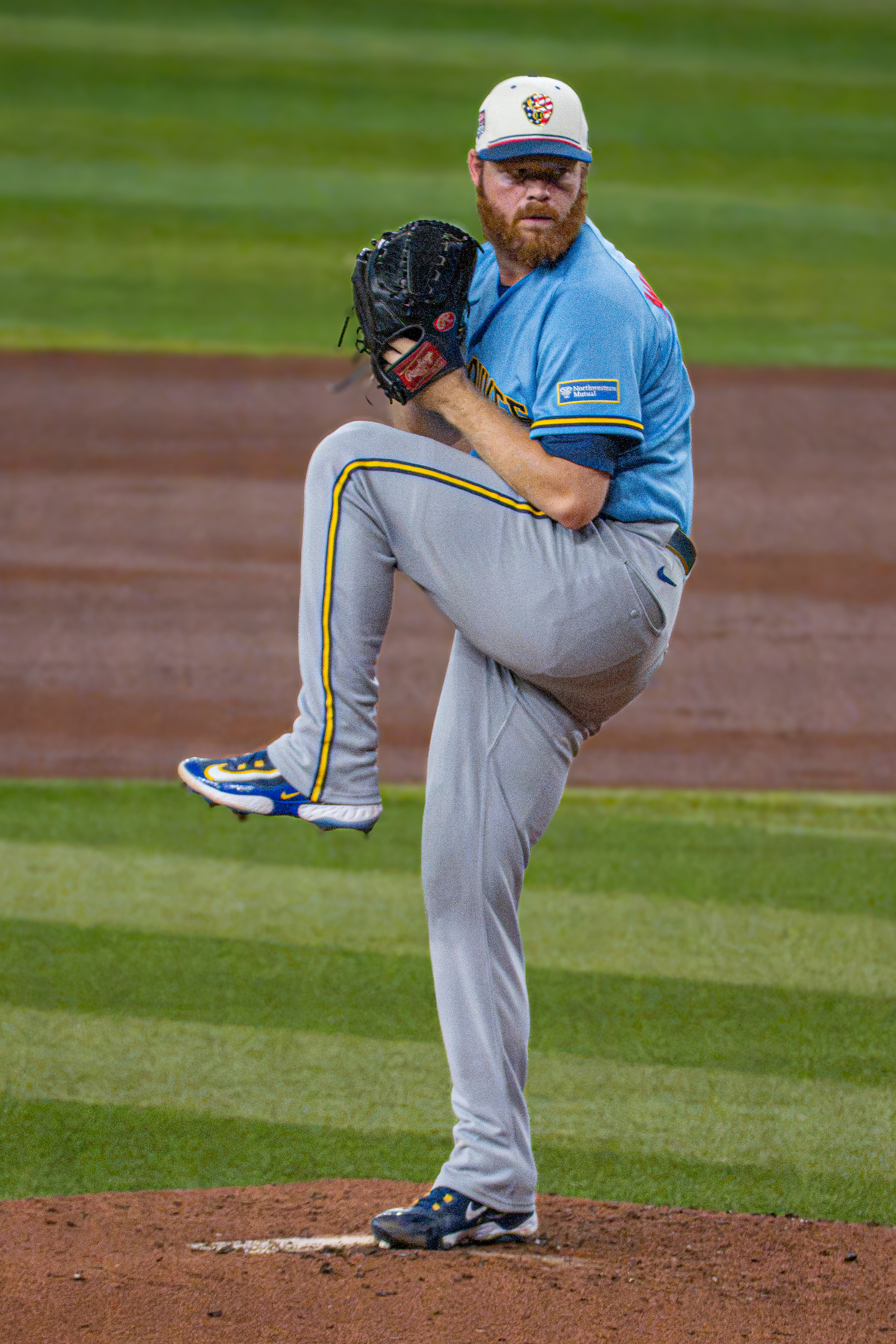
Brandon Woodruff, pitcher (2022–2023, 2025)

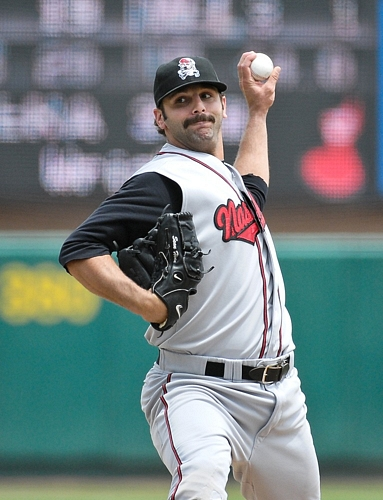
Chase Wright, pitcher (2009–2011)

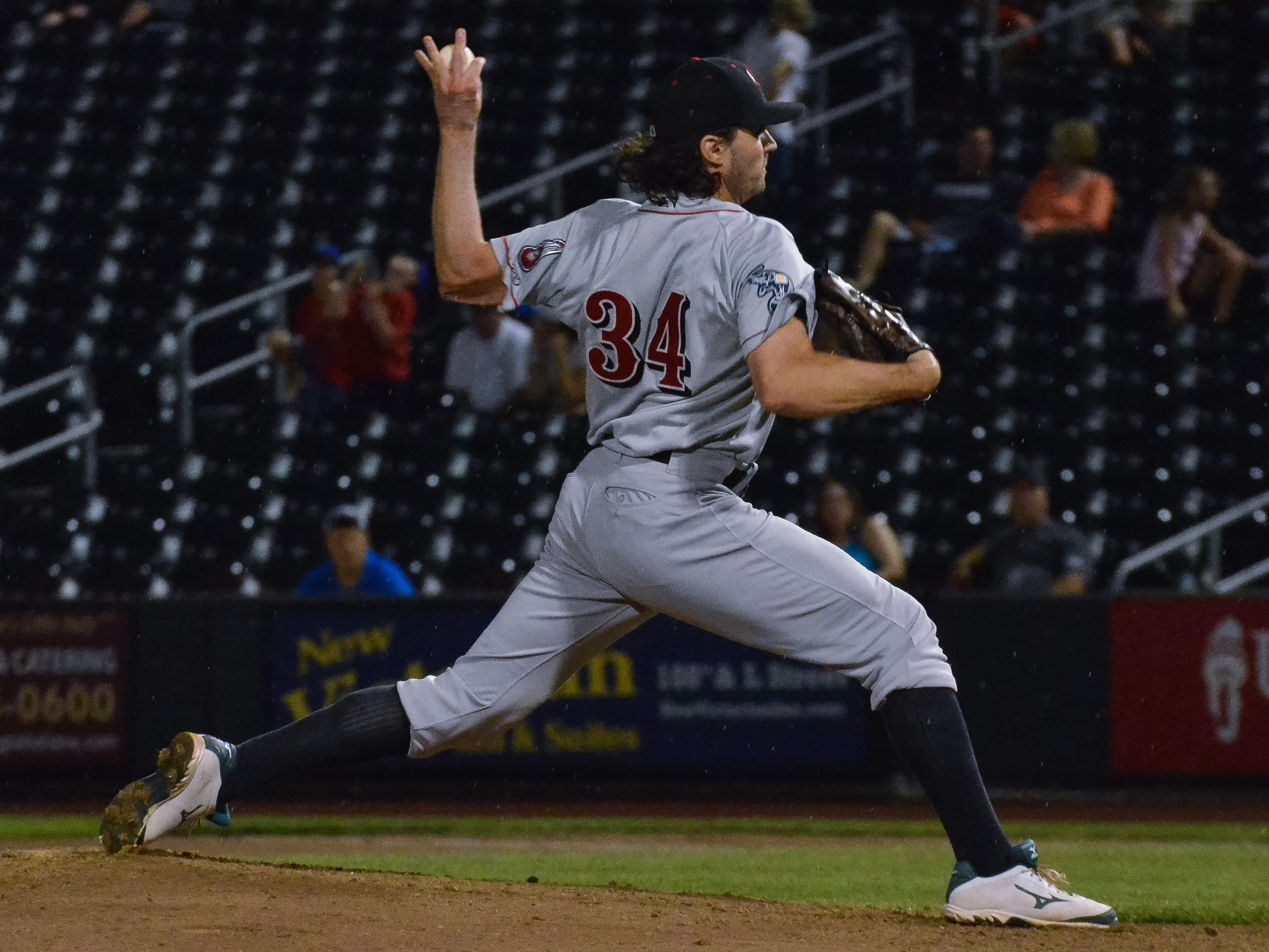
Barry Zito, pitcher (2015)

Players
Name	Season(s)	Position(s)	MLB
Andy Abad	2004, 2007	OF/1B	Yes
Fernando Abad	2023	P	Yes
Jeff Abbott	1996–1997	LF	Yes
Brent Abernathy	2006	2B	Yes
Juan Acevedo	2004	P	Yes
Willy Adames	2022	SS	Yes
Jordyn Adams	2026	RF	Yes
Luke Adams	2026	1B/3B	No
Mike Adams	2005–2006	P	Yes
Troy Afenir	1992	C	Yes
Paul Ah Yat	1999–2001	P	No
Arismendy Alcántara	2016	CF	Yes
Raúl Alcántara	2016–2018	P	Yes
Russ Aldrich	1979	1B	No
Jason Alexander	2022–2023	P	Yes
Jorge Alfaro	2025	C	Yes
Anthony Aliotti	2015	1B	No
Kolby Allard	2019	P	Yes
Greg Allen	2023	CF	Yes
Luke Allen	2004	OF	Yes
Neil Allen	1990	P	Yes
Abraham Almonte	2022	LF	Yes
Erick Almonte	2009–2012	PH/1B	Yes
Héctor Almonte	2004	P	Yes
Clemente Álvarez	1993–1994	C	Yes
Eddy Alvarez	2023	2B/OF	Yes
Henderson Álvarez	2016	P	Yes
Jose Alvarez	1991–1992	P	Yes
R. J. Alvarez	2015–2016; 2021	P	Yes
Tavo Álvarez	1998	P	Yes
Tony Álvarez	2003–2004	OF	Yes
Wilson Álvarez^{†} (Note: Wilson Álvarez: AL All-Star (1994))	1993	P	Yes
Brett Anderson	2018	P	Yes
Brian Anderson	2023	3B/DH	Yes
Bryan Anderson	2015–2016	C	Yes
Drew Anderson	2006–2007, 2009–2010	LF	Yes
Grant Anderson	2025–2026	P	Yes
Jimmy Anderson	1998–2000	P	Yes
Josh Anderson	2010	CF/PH	Yes
Clayton Andrews	2021, 2023	P	Yes
Sheldon Andrews	1982*	P	No
Luis Andújar	1996, 2000	P	Yes
Matt Angle	2015	LF/DH	Yes
Greg Aquino	2007	P	Yes
Ismael Aquino	2018	P	No
Patrick Arlis	2009–2011	C	No
Jack Armstrong^{†} (Note: Jack Armstrong: NL All-Star (1990))	1988–1989, 1991	P	Yes
Mike Armstrong	1979	P	Yes
Bronson Arroyo^{†} (Note: Bronson Arroyo: NL Gold Glove (2010), NL All-Star (2006))	1999–2002	P	Yes
Christian Arroyo	2024	2B	Yes
Aaron Ashby	2021, 2023–2025	P	Yes
Drew Avans	2025	CF	Yes
Bruce Aven	2000	LF	Yes
Andrés Ávila	2016*	P	No
John Axford^{†} (Note: John Axford: NL Relief Man (2011))	2009–2010, 2017	P	Yes
Mike Ayers	2000–2001	P	No
Akil Baddoo	2026	RF	Yes
Ji-hwan Bae	2026	2B	Yes
Cory Bailey	2000	P	Yes
Brian Baker	2012	P	No
Doug Baker	1985–1986	SS	Yes
Kenneth Baker	1980	OF	No
Robbie Baker	2022	P	No
Steve Balboni	1980	1B	Yes
James Baldwin^{†} (Note: James Baldwin: AL All-Star (2000))	1993–1996	P	Yes
Johnny Baldwin	1984	P	No
Grant Balfour^{†} (Note: Grant Balfour: AL All-Star (2013))	2007	P	Yes
Jett Bandy	2019	C	Yes
Dave Banes	1982	SS	No
Travis Baptist	2000	P	Yes
John Barfield	1993	P	Yes
Luke Barker	2021–2022	P	Yes
Andy Barkett	2001	1B	Yes
Joe Barlow	2019	P	Yes
John Barnes	2003	LF	Yes
Skeeter Barnes	1979, 1988–1990	OF	Yes
Chris Barnwell	2005–2007	SS	Yes
Franklin Barreto	2016–2018	SS/2B	Yes
Tom Barrett	1984	2B	Yes
Blake Barthol	2003	C	No
Chris Bassitt^{†} (Note: Chris Bassitt: AL All-Star (2021))	2015, 2017–2018	P	Yes
Joe Bateman	2008	P	No
Billy Bates	1990–1991	2B	Yes
Allen Battle	1997	CF/LF	Yes
Jake Bauers^{†} (Note: Jake Bauers: NL Championship Series Most Valuable Player (2026), NL Silver Slugger (2026))	2025	1B	Yes
Logan Bawcom	2017	P	No
Jason Bay^{†} (Note: Jason Bay: NL Rookie of the Year (2004), AL Silver Slugger (2009), NL All-Star (2005, 2006), AL All-Star (2009))	2004	OF	Yes
Trevor Bayless	2015	P	No
Andrew Beattie	2006	2B/3B	No
Preston Beck	2019	RF	No
Pete Beeler	1991	C	No
Derek Bell	2001	RF	Yes
Esteban Beltré	1993	SS	Yes
Freddie Benavides	1989–1991	SS	Yes
Wes Benjamin	2019	P	Yes
Jeff Bennett	2003, 2005, 2010	P	Yes
Nick Bennett	2022–2024	P	No
Kris Benson	1998, 2002	P	Yes
Jeff Berblinger	2001	3B	Yes
Jason Bere^{†} (Note: Jason Bere: AL All-Star (1994))	1993, 1995–1996	P	Yes
Bruce Berenyi	1978	P	Yes
Dave Bergman	1985	1B	Yes
Gerónimo Berroa	1992	OF	Yes
Steward Berroa	2025–2026	CF	Yes
Mark Berry	1987	C/1B	No
Mark Bersano	1982–1983	P	No
Mike Bertotti	1995–1997	P	Yes
Alec Bettinger	2021–2022	P	Yes
Jeff Bianchi	2012–2014	SS	Yes
Kennard Bibbs	2006	LF	No
Austin Bibens-Dirkx	2019	P	Yes
Steve Bieser	1998–1999	C	Yes
Kyle Bird	2019	P	Yes
Tim Birtsas	1988, 1990	P	Yes
Tyler Black	2023–2026	LF/1B	Yes
Paul Blackburn^{†} (Note: Paul Blackburn: AL All-Star (2022))	2017	P	Yes
Nolan Blackwood	2024	P	No
Carson Blair	2015–2016	C	Yes
Mark Blaser	1983–1984	3B/DH	No
Michael Blazek	2014	P	Yes
Jeremy Bleich	2018	P	Yes
Dan Boever	1987–1988	OF	No
Brandon Boggs	2011	LF	Yes
Skye Bolt	2023	LF	Yes
Rodney Bolton	1993–1995	P	Yes
Tom Bolton	1995, 1998	P	Yes
Pat Borders	2005	C	Yes
Paul Boris	1980	P	Yes
J. C. Boscán	2006	C	Yes
Jason Bourgeois	2009	CF	Yes
Caleb Boushley	2022–2023	P	Yes
Kaleb Bowman	2026	P	No
Rod Boxberger	1981	P	No
B. J. Boyd	2016, 2018	LF	No
Jason Boyd	1999, 2004	P	Yes
Ben Bracewell	2017–2018	P	No
Zach Braddock	2010–2011	P	Yes
Scott Bradley	1982–1983, 1992	C	Yes
Doug Brady	1993, 1995–1997	2B	Yes
Michael Brady	2017	P	Yes
Sam Bragg	2018	P	No
Jeff Branson	1991–1992	SS	Yes
Mickey Brantley	1992	OF	Yes
Russell Branyan	2005, 2008	3B	Yes
Ryan Brasier	2015–2016	P	Yes
Ryan Braun^{†} (Note: Ryan Braun: NL Most Valuable Player (2011), NL Rookie of the Year (2007), NL Silver Slugger (2008, 2009, 2010, 2011, 2012), NL All-Star (2008, 2009, 2010, 2011, 2012, 2015))	2007	3B	Yes
Steve Bray	2006–2008	P	No
Brent Brede	2000	RF/LF	Yes
Fred Breining	1985–1986	P	Yes
Darryl Brinkley	1998–2000	LF	No
Luis Brito	1998	SS	No
Aaron Brooks	2015	P	Yes
Frank Brooks	2003–2004	P	Yes
Mike Brosseau	2022–2023	3B	Yes
Rex Brothers	2022	P	Yes
Adrian Brown	1998–2000, 2002	CF/RF	Yes
Darrell Brown	1985	OF	Yes
Emil Brown	1999–2000	RF	Yes
Eric Brown	2026	2B	No
Jordan Brown	2011–2012	LF	Yes
Keith Brown	1988–1992	P	Yes
Marty Brown	1988–1989	3B	Yes
Randy Brown	1998	SS	No
Scott Brown	1978–1979	P	Yes
Zack Brown	2021–2022	P	No
Mike Browning	1985	P	No
Tom Browning^{†} (Note: Tom Browning: NL All-Star (1991))	1987	P	Yes
Keon Broxton	2021	CF/LF	Yes
Matt Bruback	2003	P	No
Jaycob Brugman	2016–2017	CF	Yes
Jacob Brumfield	1992	OF	Yes
Brian Bruney	2010	P	Yes
Joe Bruno	1989	P	No
Bob Buchanan	1992	P	Yes
Ryan Buchter	2018	P	Yes
Billy Buckner	2014	P	Yes
J. B. Bukauskas	2023–2024, 2026	P	Yes
Dayton Buller	2011–2013	C	No
Hiram Burgos	2012–2014	P	Yes
Blake Burke	2026	1B	No
Brock Burke	2019	P	Yes
Tim Burke^{†} (Note: Tim Burke: NL All-Star (1989))	1983	P	Yes
Sean Burnett	2004	P	Yes
Billy Burns	2015–2016	CF	Yes
Mike Burns	2009	P	Yes
Dave Bush	2008	P	Yes
Matt Bush	2023	P	Yes
Chris Bushing	1992–1994	P	Yes
Josh Butler	2009–2012	P	Yes
Brian Butterfield	1982	2B	No
Trevor Cahill	2018	P	Yes
Lorenzo Cain^{†} (Note: Lorenzo Cain: AL Championship Series Most Valuable Player (2014), NL Gold Glove (2019), AL Defensive Player of the Year (2012, 2013), Defensive Player of the Year (2014, 2019), AL All-Star (2015), NL All-Star (2018))	2008, 2010, 2021	CF	Yes
Willie Calhoun	2019	LF	Yes
Ben Callahan	1982–1984	P	Yes
Pat Callahan	1980–1982	C	No
Joseph Camacho	2018	P	No
Daz Cameron	2025	LF/RF	Yes
Mike Cameron^{†} (Note: Mike Cameron: AL Gold Glove (2001, 2003), NL Gold Glove (2006), AL All-Star (2001))	1997, 2008	CF	Yes
Shawn Camp	2001–2003	P	Yes
Noah Campbell	2023–2024	LF	No
Frank Campos	1993	P	No
George Canale	1998	1B	Yes
Casey Candaele	1998	2B/SS	Yes
Mark Canha	2017–2018	RF	Yes
José Capellán	2005, 2007	P	Yes
Carmine Cappuccio	1995–1997	LF/RF	No
George Cappuzzello	1979, 1984	P	Yes
Nick Capra	1992	OF	Yes
Vinny Capra	2024	SS/2B	Yes
Chris Capuano	2010	P	Yes
Shane Carle	2019	P	Yes
Luke Carlin	2015	C	Yes
David Carpenter	2019	P	Yes
Alden Carrithers	2015	3B/LF	No
Brett Carroll	2011	CF	Yes
Matt Carson	2015	RF	Yes
Chris Carter	2017	1B/DH	Yes
Jeff Carter	1993	P	Yes
Gino Caruso	1998	P	No
Chuck Cary	1985–1986, 1993	P	Yes
Adam Casillas	1990–1991	OF	No
Victor Castaneda	2021–2022	P	No
Carlos Castillo	1997	P	Yes
Frank Castillo	1999	P	Yes
Jesús Castillo	2021	P	No
Ángel Castro	2015–2016	P	Yes
Luis Castro	2021	1B	No
Simón Castro	2017–2018	P	Yes
Troy Cate	2008	P	Yes
Chuckie Caufield	2010	PH	No
Blas Cedeno	2002	P	No
Scott Cepicky	1993	OF/DH	No
Matt Chapman^{†} (Note: Matt Chapman: AL Gold Glove (2018, 2019, 2021, 2023), NL Gold Glove (2024), Defensive Player of the Year (2018, 2019), Overall Defensive Player of the Year (2018), AL All-Star (2019))	2016–2017	3B	Yes
Nate Chapman	1980–1982	OF	No
Norm Charlton^{†} (Note: Norm Charlton: NL All-Star (1992))	1987–1988	P	Yes
Ozzie Chavez	2006–2008, 2013	SS	No
Pedro Chavez	1985–1986	2B/SS	No
Wilton Chavez	2006	P	No
Will Childers	2025–2026	P	No
Harold Chirino	2024	P	No
Randy Choate	2008	P	Yes
Jackson Chourio^{†} (Note: Jackson Chourio: NL Gold Glove (2026), NL Silver Slugger (2026), All-MLB First Team (2026))	2023, 2025–2026	CF/RF	Yes
Clay Christiansen	1981–1982	P	Yes
Jason Christiansen	1999	P	Yes
Clint Chrysler	2001	P	No
Vinnie Chulk	2012	P	Yes
Jeff Cirillo	2005	3B	Yes
Aaron Civale	2025	P	Yes
Jermaine Clark	2006	2B/3B	Yes
Matt Clark	2014	1B	Yes
Taylor Clarke	2024	P	Yes
Wes Clarke	2024–2025	1B	No
Alex Claudio	2023	P	Yes
Chris Clemons	1997	P	Yes
Ambioris Cleto	2000	2B	No
Brad Clontz	1999–2000	P	Yes
JD Closser	2007	C	Yes
Yeison Coca	2021–2022	SS	No
Chris Cody	2009	P	No
Todd Coffey	2010	P	Yes
Jim Coffman	1983	P	No
Phil Coke	2015	P	Yes
Calvin Coker	2018	P	No
Hunter Cole	2019	RF/DH	No
Kenneth Coleman	1994	3B	No
Darnell Coles	1992	3B	Yes
Dave Collins	1987	DH	Yes
Isaac Collins	2023–2024	LF	Yes
Jesús Colomé	2009	P	Yes
Benny Colvard	1990	OF	No
Geoff Combe	1978–1979	P	Yes
Jeffrey Conner	1985–1986	P	No
Brooks Conrad	2012	2B	Yes
Luis Contreras	2022–2023	P	Yes
Ryan Cook	2015	P	Yes
Scott Coolbaugh	1992	3B	Yes
Ron Coomer^{†} (Note: Ron Coomer: AL All-Star (1999))	1993	3B	Yes
Don Cooper	1980	P	Yes
Trace Coquillette	2002	CF	Yes
Doug Corbett^{†} (Note: Doug Corbett: AL All-Star (1981))	1978	P	Yes
Joe Corbett	2026	P	No
Francisco Córdova	1999, 2001	P	Yes
Mark Corey	2003–2004	P	Yes
Alexander Cornielle	2025	P	No
Carlos Corporán	2008–2009	C	Yes
Nestor Cortes	2025	P	Yes
Fred Costello	1995	P	No
Humberto Cota	2001–2004	C	Yes
Henry Cotto	1995	DH/LF	Yes
Jharel Cotton	2016–2017	P	Yes
John Cotton	1997, 2001	RF	No
Kevin Coughlin	1993, 1995	LF	No
Danny Coulombe	2016, 2018	P	Yes
Jake Cousins	2021–2023	P	Yes
Dylan Cozens	2021	RF	Yes
Callix Crabbe	2007–2008	2B	Yes
Randy Craig	1982	1B/DH	No
Tyler Cravy	2014	P	Yes
Carlos Crawford	1998	P	Yes
Chris Cron	1993, 1995	1B	Yes
Coleman Crow	2025–2026	P	Yes
Mike Crudale	2004	P	Yes
Enrique Cruz	2006	3B	Yes
Iván Cruz	1999–2000	1B	Yes
Luis Cruz	2010	SS	Yes
Nelson Cruz	1997	P	Yes
Nelson R. Cruz^{†} (Note: Nelson R. Cruz: Edgar Martínez Award (2017), AL Championship Series Most Valuable Player (2011), Roberto Clemente Award (2021), AL Silver Slugger (2015, 2017, 2019, 2020), AL All-Star (2009, 2013, 2014, 2015, 2017, 2018, 2021), All-MLB First Team (2019), All-MLB Second Team (2020))	2005–2006	RF	Yes
Víctor Cruz	1985	P	Yes
John Csefalvay	1984	OF	No
Jermaine Curtis	2017	3B/1B	Yes
Zac Curtis	2019	P	Yes
David Cusack	1986	1B	No
Bill Cutshall	1987	P	No
Fred Dabney	1993	P	No
David Dahl	2021–2022	RF	Yes
Greg Dahl	1978	C	No
Bobby Dalbec	2025	RF/3B	Yes
Pete Dalena	1983–1984	1B	Yes
Dave Daniels	1998	P	No
Chase d'Arnaud	2019	2B	Yes
Jeff Darwin	1996–1997	P	Yes
Matt Davidson	2019	1B	Yes
Randy Davidson	1978	2B	No
Tucker Davidson	2025	P	Yes
Blake Davis	2013	SS	Yes
Doug Davis	2010	P	Yes
Ike Davis	2015	1B	Yes
J. J. Davis	2003–2004	RF	Yes
John Davis	1995	P	Yes
Jonathan Davis	2022	CF	Yes
Kane Davis	1999, 2005	P	Yes
Kentrail Davis	2013	CF	No
Khris Davis^{†} (Note: Khris Davis: Edgar Martínez Award (2018))	2012–2013	LF	Yes
Bill Dawley^{†} (Note: Bill Dawley: NL All-Star (1983))	1978–1979	P	Yes
Brian Dayett	1980–1982	OF/3B	Yes
Frankie de la Cruz	2011, 2013	P	Yes
Anderson de la Rosa	2010, 2013	C	No
Eury De La Rosa	2015	P	Yes
Tomás de la Rosa	2002–2004	SS	Yes
José De La Torre	2014	P	Yes
Fautino de los Santos	2012	P	Yes
Jaff Decker	2017	CF/RF	Yes
Steve Decker	1998	C	Yes
Tony DeFrancesco	1988, 1990–1991	C	No
Miguel Del Pozo	2019	P	Yes
Raynel Delgado	2025	2B	Yes
Chris Demaria	2006	P	Yes
Todd Demeter	1983	1B	No
Pat Dempsey	1984	C	No
Brian Denman	1985–1986	P	Yes
Drew Denson	1993–1994	DH	Yes
Tyler Depreta-Johnson	2019	2B/SS/P	No
Bubba Derby	2021	P	No
Jim Deshaies	1984	P	Yes
Delino DeShields Jr.	2019	CF	Yes
Elmer Dessens	1998, 2007	P	Yes
Orestes Destrade	1984	OF	Yes
Ross Detwiler	2016–2017	P	Yes
Cam Devanney	2022–2023	SS	Yes
Jordan Devencenzi	2016	C	No
Duane Dewey	1984	C	No
Mark Dewey	2001	P	Yes
Brent Diaz	2021–2023	C	No
Edgar Díaz	1992	SS	Yes
Robinzon Díaz	2013–2014	C	Yes
Rob Dibble^{†} (Note: Rob Dibble: NL Championship Series Most Valuable Player (1990), NL All-Star (1990, 1991))	1987–1988	P	Yes
R. A. Dickey^{†} (Note: R. A. Dickey: NL Cy Young Award (2012), AL Gold Glove (2013), NL All-Star (2012))	2007	P	Yes
Mark DiFelice	2007–2008, 2011	P	Yes
Tim Dillard	2007–2014, 2019	P	Yes
Joe Dillon	2007–2008	3B	Yes
Mike Diorio	2000	P	No
Glenn DiSarcina	1996	SS	No
Tom Dodd	1982–1983	OF	Yes
Timothy Doerr	1978	3B	No
Roger Doman	1998	P	No
Bo Donaldson	2001	P	No
Josh Donaldson	2023	3B/DH	Yes
Ryan Doolittle	2016	P	No
Sean Doolittle	2015–2017	P	Yes
Patrick Dorrian	2022–2024	3B	No
David Doster	2003	2B	Yes
Félix Doubront	2017	P	Yes
Jim Dougherty	1999, 2002	P	Yes
Brett Dowdy	2010	PH/LF	No
Kyle Dowdy	2019	P	Yes
Brian Downs	1997	C	No
Doug Drabek^{†} (Note: Doug Drabek: NL Cy Young Award (1990), NL All-Star (1994))	1984	P	Yes
Brian Drahman	1993	P	Yes
Shane Drohan	2026	P	Yes
Tim Drummond	1992	P	Yes
Chris Duffy	2009	CF/DH	Yes
Ryan Dull	2015, 2017–2018	P	Yes
Matt Dunbar	1999	P	Yes
Rick Duncan	1978–1979	1B	No
Oliver Dunn	2024–2025	3B	Yes
Caleb Durbin^{†} (Note: Caleb Durbin: AL Gold Glove (2026))	2025	3B	Yes
Ray Durham^{†} (Note: Ray Durham: AL All-Star (1998, 2000))	1994	2B	Yes
Trent Durrington	2005	3B	Yes
Mickey Duval	1978	OF	No
Scott Earl	1985–1986, 1988	2B	Yes
Tim Edge	1998	C	No
Brett Eibner	2016	CF/RF	Yes
Robert Ellis	1994–1996	P	Yes
Guy Elston	1981–1982	P	No
Dave Engle	1986	OF	Yes
Lucas Erceg	2022–2023	P	Yes
Matt Erickson	2005	3B	Yes
Nick Esasky	1987	1B	Yes
Ruben Escalera	1992	OF	No
Alcides Escobar^{†} (Note: Alcides Escobar: AL Championship Series Most Valuable Player (2015), AL Gold Glove (2015), AL All-Star (2015))	2009	SS	Yes
Yoel Espinal	2019	P	No
Juan Espino	1980	C	Yes
Marco Estrada^{†} (Note: Marco Estrada: AL All-Star (2016))	2010, 2012–2013	P	Yes
Dave Evans	1998	P	No
Jason Evans	1997	LF	No
Dana Eveland	2006	P	Yes
Brett Evert	2005–2006	P	No
Pete Fairbanks	2019	P	Yes
Bob Fallon	1986	P	Yes
Irving Falú	2014	2B/SS/3B	Yes
Eric Farris	2010–2012	2B	Yes
Kelly Faulk	1983–1984	P	No
Tim Federowicz	2019	C	Yes
Brady Feigl	2019	P	No
Mario Feliciano	2021–2022	C	Yes
Mark Ferguson	1984	P	No
Jared Fernández	2006	P	Yes
Junior Fernández	2026	P	Yes
Pedro Fernandez	2023	P	No
Raul Ferreyra	1979	P	No
Prince Fielder^{†} (Note: Prince Fielder: NL Hank Aaron Award (2007), AL Comeback Player of the Year (2015), NL Silver Slugger (2007, 2011), AL Silver Slugger (2012), NL All-Star (2007, 2009, 2011), AL All-Star (2012, 2013, 2015), All-Star Game Most Valuable Player (2011))	2005	1B	Yes
Bruce Fields	1986	OF	Yes
Josh Fields	2019	P	Yes
Mike Fiers	2011–2014	P	Yes
Alfredo Fígaro	2013–2014	P	Yes
Luis D. Figueroa	2004	3B	No
Luis R. Figueroa	2000–2001, 2011	SS	Yes
Nelson Figueroa	2003–2004	P	Yes
Dylan File	2021–2022	P	Yes
Tom Filer	1980	P	Yes
Pete Filson	1981	P	Yes
Brian Finley	1987–1988	OF	No
Kyle Finnegan	2017–2018	P	Yes
Brian Fisher	1992	P	Yes
Derek Fisher	2021	RF	Yes
Brian Fitzpatrick	2025–2026	P	Yes
Randy Flores	2011	P	Yes
Josh Fogg	2003	P	Yes
Nolan Fontana	2019	2B	Yes
Ray Fontenot	1982	P	Yes
Tom Fordham	1996–1997, 2003	P	Yes
Blake Forsythe	2015	C	No
Logan Forsythe	2021	PH/2B	Yes
Steve Foster	1991–1992	P	Yes
Keith Foulke^{†} (Note: Keith Foulke: AL Relief Man (2003), AL All-Star (2003))	1997	P	Yes
Don Fowler	1984	P	No
Dustin Fowler	2018	CF	Yes
Michael Fowler	2025	P	No
Bowden Francis	2021	P	Yes
Seth Frankoff	2015	P	Yes
Dan Fraraccio	1995	SS	No
Parker Frazier	2015	P	No
Nate Freiman	2015	DH/1B	Yes
Sal Frelick^{†} (Note: Sal Frelick: NL Gold Glove (2024))	2022–2023, 2026	CF	Yes
Kyle Friedrichs	2018	P	No
David Fry	2021	3B	Yes
Jim Fuller	2015	P	No
Chris Fussell	2004	P	Yes
Éric Gagné	2008	P	Yes
Steve Gajkowski	1995–1996	P	Yes
Yovani Gallardo^{†} (Note: Yovani Gallardo: NL Silver Slugger (2010), NL All-Star (2010))	2007–2008	P	Yes
Matt Gallegos	1983–1984	2B	No
Mat Gamel	2008–2011	3B/1B	Yes
Gerson Garabito	2026	P	Yes
Pablo Garabitos	2022	P	No
Víctor Gárate	2012	P	Yes
Anthony García	2018	OF/DH	No
Deivi García	2025	P	Yes
Eduardo Garcia	2026	SS	No
Freddy García	1998–1999	3B	Yes
Leo García	1987–1988, 1990–1991	OF	Yes
Luis García	2002	3B	Yes
Mike Garcia	1999–2000	P	Yes
Ramón García	1993	P	Yes
Victor Garcia	1991	P	No
Michael Garciaparra	2009	2B	No
Nick Gardewine	2019	P	Yes
Richie Gardner	2008	P	No
Wayne Garland	1982	P	Yes
Dustin Garneau	2018	C	Yes
Cole Garner	2013	RF	Yes
Kevin Garner	1992	DH	No
Reed Garrett	2019	P	Yes
Robert Gasser	2022–2026	P	Yes
Huey Gayden	1982	DH	No
Phil Geisler	1998	RF	No
Scooter Gennett^{†} (Note: Scooter Gennett: NL All-Star (2018))	2013	2B	Yes
Craig Gentry	2015	CF	Yes
Mark Germann	1989	SS/2B	No
Ken Giard	1998–1999	P	No
Ian Gibaut	2019	P	Yes
Jay Gibbons	2008, 2012	RF	Yes
Paul Gibson	1986	P	Yes
Shawn Gilbert	1993, 2002–2003	3B	Yes
Cole Gillespie	2009	LF	Yes
Caleb Gindl	2011–2014	RF/CF	Yes
Matt Ginter	2007, 2009	P	Yes
Scott Gleckel	1980	P	No
Gary Glover	2005	P	Yes
Zack Godley	2021	P	Yes
Cooper Goldby	2018	DH	No
Jason Goldstein	2018	PH	No
Wayne Gomes	2002	P	Yes
Carlos Gómez^{†} (Note: Carlos Gómez: NL Gold Glove (2013), NL Defensive Player of the Year (2012, 2013), NL All-Star (2013, 2014))	2010	CF	Yes
Héctor Gómez	2014	SS	Yes
Andy González	2011–2012	3B	Yes
Angel Gonzalez	1991	2B	No
Denny González	1990–1992	3B	Yes
Fernando González	1984	DH	Yes
Mike Gonzalez	2003–2004	P	Yes
Orlando González	1987–1988	SS/3B	No
Colton Gordon	2026	P	Yes
Tom Gorzelanny	2014	P	Yes
Daniel Gossett	2016–2018	P	Yes
Trevor Gott	2022	P	Yes
John Grabow	2003	P	Yes
Randy Graham	1984	P	No
Zack Granite	2019	CF/LF	Yes
Kendall Graveman	2015, 2017–2018	P	Yes
Jeff Gray	1987–1989	P	Yes
Sonny Gray^{†} (Note: Sonny Gray: NL All-Star (2019), All-MLB Second Team (2026))	2017	P	Yes
Craig Grebeck	1994	SS	Yes
Gary Green	1992	SS	Yes
Nick Green	2009	P	No
Scarborough Green	2001	RF	Yes
Sean Green	2011	P	Yes
Taylor Green	2011–2012, 2014	3B	Yes
Zach Green	2021	3B/1B	Yes
Zack Greinke^{†} (Note: Zack Greinke: NL Gold Glove (2014, 2015, 2016, 2017, 2018, 2019), Defensive Player of the Year (2016, 2018, 2019), NL Silver Slugger (2013, 2019), NL All-Star (2014, 2015, 2017, 2019), All-MLB Second Team (2019))	2011	P	Yes
A. J. Griffin	2015	P	Yes
Joe Griffin	1978	C	No
Mike Griffin	1989	P	Yes
Kevin Grijak	1998	1B	No
Gabe Gross	2007	RF/LF	Yes
Kip Gross	1990–1991	P	Yes
Johnny Grubb	1986	OF/DH	Yes
John Guarnaccia	1978	OF	No
Randy Guerra	1981–1982	1B/P	No
Matt Guerrier	2002–2003	P	Yes
Taylor Guerrieri	2019	P	Yes
Daniel Guilarte	2026	2B	No
José Guillén	1999	RF	Yes
Mike Gulan	2003	3B	Yes
Brad Gulden	1980	C	Yes
Lindsay Gulin	2007–2009	P	No
Jandel Gustave	2021–2022	P	Yes
Vladimir Gutiérrez	2024	P	Yes
Brad Guy	2001	P	No
Ronald Guzmán	2019	1B	Yes
Doug Gwosdz	1988–1989	C	Yes
Tony Gwynn Jr.	2006–2009	CF	Yes
Yamid Haad	2001	C	Yes
Eric Haase	2024–2025	C	Yes
Luther Hackman	2004, 2006–2007	P	Yes
Jake Hager	2021	SS	Yes
Jesse Hahn	2016–2017	P	Yes
Adam Hall	2025	LF/CF	No
Bill Hall	2009	SS/RF	Yes
DL Hall	2024–2026	P	Yes
Drew Hall	1991	P	Yes
Joe Hall	1993–1994	OF	Yes
Kris Hall	2015	P	No
Mel Hall	1996	DH	Yes
Mike Halperin	1998	P	No
Sean Halton	2012–2014	OF/1B	Yes
Bob Hamilton	1978–1979	OF	No
David Hamilton	2026	3B	Yes
Atlee Hammaker	1994–1995	P	Yes
Chris Hammond	1989–1990	P	Yes
Steve Hammond	2008	P	No
Donovan Hand	2010–2014	P	Yes
Dan Hanggie	1980–1981	3B	No
Greg Hansell	1999	P	Yes
Tyson Hardin	2026	P	No
Blaine Hardy	2021	P	Yes
J. J. Hardy^{†} (Note: J. J. Hardy: AL Gold Glove (2012, 2013, 2014), AL Defensive Player of the Year (2012), AL Silver Slugger (2013), AL All-Star (2013))	2009	SS	Yes
Matt Hardy	2022	P	No
Brian Harper	1986	C	Yes
Butch Harris	1978	OF	No
Hobie Harris	2022	P	Yes
James Harris	2015	RF/CF	No
John Harris	1985	OF	Yes
Lenny Harris	1987–1989	2B/SS	Yes
Monte Harrison	2023	CF/RF	Yes
Corey Hart^{†} (Note: Corey Hart: NL All-Star (2008, 2010))	2005–2006, 2009, 2011	RF/LF	Yes
Corey D. Hart	2005	2B	No
Kent Hasler	2022	P	No
Alex Hassan	2015	LF/RF	Yes
Derek Hasselhoff	1997	P	No
Chris Hatcher	2018	P	Yes
Kevin Haverbusch	2001–2002	LF	No
Johnny Hawkins	1984	C	No
LaTroy Hawkins	2010–2011	P	Yes
Alan Hayden	1989	OF	No
Jason Haynie	1998	P	No
Ryon Healy	2016	1B/3B	Yes
Tucker Healy	2016–2017	P	No
Taylor Hearn	2019	P	Yes
Mike Heathcott	1997	P	Yes
Slade Heathcott	2018	1B	Yes
Kyle Heckathorn	2013–2014	P	No
Adam Heether	2008–2010	3B	No
Bronson Heflin	2000	P	Yes
Scott Heineman	2019	RF	Yes
Don Heinkel	1985–1986	P	Yes
Rick Helling	2005–2006	P	Yes
Johnny Hellweg	2013–2014	P	Yes
Bill Hench	1980, 1982	3B	No
Jim Henderson	2011–2012, 2014	P	Yes
Logan Henderson	2024–2026	P	Yes
Ben Hendrickson	2005–2006	P	Yes
Liam Hendriks^{†} (Note: Liam Hendriks: AL Reliever of the Year (2020, 2021), AL Comeback Player of the Year (2023), AL All-Star (2019, 2021, 2022), All-MLB First Team (2020, 2021), All-MLB Second Team (2019))	2016, 2018	P	Yes
Ron Henika	1987	1B	No
Mike Henneman^{†} (Note: Mike Henneman: AL All-Star (1989))	1986	P	Yes
Payton Henry	2021, 2023	C	Yes
Clay Hensley	2013	P	Yes
Tyler Herb	2022–2023	P	No
Julian Heredia	1998	P	No
Kevin Herget	2024	P	Yes
Chad Hermansen	1998–2002	CF	Yes
Jeremy Hermida	2014	RF	Yes
Jesús Hernáiz	1983	P	Yes
Alex Hernández	2000–2001	1B/RF	Yes
Ariel Hernández	2019	P	Yes
César Hernández	1992	OF	Yes
Chuck Hernandez	1983	P	No
Juan Hernandez	1984	3B	No
Yonny Hernández	2024	2B/SS	Yes
Daniel Herrera	2011	P	Yes
Elián Herrera	2014	CF/2B	Yes
Ronald Herrera	2019	P	Yes
Jimmy Herron	2025	RF/LF	No
Brewer Hicklen	2024	RF	Yes
Bobby Hill	2003	2B	Yes
Milt Hill	1990–1992	P	Yes
Orsino Hill	1987	OF	No
Robert Hinton	2009–2011	P	No
Keston Hiura	2021–2023	1B	Yes
Rod Hobbs	1986	OF	No
Jim Hoey	2013	P	Yes
Trevor Hoffman^{†} (Note: Trevor Hoffman: NL Relief Man (1998, 2006), NL All-Star (1998, 1999, 2000, 2002, 2006, 2007, 2009), National Baseball Hall of Fame (2018))	1992, 2009	P	Yes
Aaron Holbert	2003	SS	Yes
Greg Holle	2013	P	No
Mike Holtz	2003	P	Yes
Blake Holub	2024–2026	P	No
J. R. Hopf	2007–2008	C/1B	No
Norris Hopper	2010	CF	Yes
Rhys Hoskins	2025	1B/DH	Yes
J. R. House	2003*–2004	C	Yes
Paul Householder	1979	OF	Yes
Adrian Houser	2022–2023	P	Yes
Jeff Housman	2005	P	No
Ryan Houston	2009	P	No
Ben Howard	2008	P	Yes
Chris Howard	1993	P	Yes
Matt Howard	1999	2B	Yes
Thomas Howard	2001	DH	Yes
Tim Howard	1995	3B/2B	No
Jay Howell^{†} (Note: Jay Howell: AL All-Star (1985, 1987), NL All-Star (1989))	1978	P	Yes
Mark Howie	1992	2B/3B	No
Dann Howitt	1994–1995	OF	Yes
Wei-Chieh Huang	2019	P	Yes
Rex Hudler	1982	2B	Yes
Bryan Hudson	2024–2025	P	Yes
Mike Huff	1993	OF	Yes
Greg Hughes	1979	P	No
Keith Hughes	1984	OF	Yes
Steve Hughes	1978–1979	SS	No
Cooper Hummel	2021	LF	Yes
John Huntington	1978	P	No
Brock Huntzinger	2015	P	No
Dustin Hurlbutt	2017	P	No
Jimmy Hurst	1996	RF	Yes
Jacob Hurtubise	2026	RF/CF	Yes
Colt Hynes	2016	P	Yes
Adam Hyzdu	1999, 2001–2003	RF	Yes
Andy Ibáñez	2019	3B	Yes
Rodney Imes	1990–1991	P	No
Hernán Iribarren	2008–2009	2B/OF	Yes
Travis Ishikawa	2012	1B	Yes
Hansel Izquierdo	2004	P	Yes
César Izturis	2012	SS	Yes
Alex Jackson	2022–2023	C	Yes
Danny Jackson^{†} (Note: Danny Jackson: NL All-Star (1994))	1990	P	Yes
Edwin Jackson	2018	P	Yes
Jay Jackson	2014	P	Yes
Zach Jackson	2006–2008	P	Yes
Chris Jakubauskas	2013	P	Yes
Justin James	2011	P	Yes
Thomas Jankins	2021–2022	P	No
Jason Jaramillo	2012	C	Yes
Milko Jaramillo	2006	2B/3B	No
Justin Jarvis	2023	P	No
Kevin Jarvis	2004	P	Yes
Stan Javier	1984	OF	Yes
Tyler Jay	2024–2025	P	Yes
Jim Jefferson	1988	P	No
Reggie Jefferson	1990–1991	1B	Yes
Stan Jefferson	1991	OF	Yes
Jeremy Jeffress	2014	P	Yes
Greg Jemison	1980	OF	No
Chris Jensen	2016–2017	P	No
Shawn Jeter	1993	OF	Yes
Edwin Jiminez	2026	P	No
Barry Johnson	1996–1997	P	No
Ben Johnson	2010	C	No
Bob Johnson	1984	DH	Yes
Dane Johnson	1994–1995	P	Yes
David Johnson	2009–2010	P	No
Mark Johnson	2006	C	Yes
Ron Johnson	1985	1B/DH	Yes
Jerold Johnston	1980	3B	No
Mike Johnston	2004	P	Yes
Eric Jokisch	2018	P	Yes
Barry Jones	1993	P	Yes
Calvin Jones	1995	P	Yes
Chris Jones	1989–1991	OF	Yes
Greg Jones	2026	RF	Yes
Jahmai Jones	2023	LF/RF	Yes
James Jones	2019	P	Yes
Mike C. Jones	1988	P	Yes
Mike D. Jones	2009–2010	P	No
Stacy Jones	1996–1997	P	Yes
Tracy Jones	1988	OF	Yes
Manny Jose	1991	OF	No
Matt Joyce	2018	LF/DH	Yes
Taylor Jungmann	2014	P	Yes
Jakob Junis	2024	P	Yes
Janson Junk	2023–2024	P	Yes
Ariel Jurado	2019	P	Yes
Nick Kahle	2022, 2024–2025	C	No
Scott Kapers	2019	C	No
Matt Karchner	1994–1997	P	Yes
Scott Karl	2001	P	Yes
Brendan Katin	2008–2011	RF	No
Curt Kaufman	1980–1981	P	Yes
Christian Kelley	2021	C	No
Trevor Kelley	2022	P	Yes
Bill Kelly	1978–1979	P	No
Bryan Kelly	1985–1986	P	Yes
Hugh Kemp	1987–1989	P	No
Matt Keough	1984	P	Yes
Jason Kershner	2006	P	Yes
Brian Keyser	1993–1997	P	Yes
Dean Kiekhefer	2018	P	Yes
Isiah Kiner-Falefa^{†} (Note: Isiah Kiner-Falefa: AL Gold Glove (2020))	2019	SS/DH	Yes
Brad King	2003	C	No
Eric King	1986	P	Yes
Mike King	1983–1984	P	No
Brandon Kintzler^{†} (Note: Brandon Kintzler: AL All-Star (2017))	2010–2012	P	Yes
Scott Klingenbeck	1998	P	Yes
Dave Klipstein	1988	OF	No
Reiss Knehr	2026	P	Yes
Frank Kneuer	1982–1983	C	No
Tim Knight	1981–1984	OF	No
Randy Knorr	2000	C	Yes
Jon Knott	2009	RF	Yes
Ryan Knox	2005	LF/CF	No
Jared Koenig	2024, 2026	P	Yes
Brad Komminsk	1993	OF	Yes
Mike Konderla	1987	P	No
Graham Koonce	2006	1B	Yes
Joe Koshansky	2009–2010	1B	Yes
George Kottaras	2011	C	Yes
Kevin Kramer	2021	SS	Yes
Zach Kroenke	2013	P	Yes
Dave Krynzel	2005–2006	CF	Yes
Tate Kuehner	2025–2026	P	No
Larry Kuhn	1980*	P	No
Joel Kuhnel	2024, 2026	P	Yes
Rusty Kuntz	1985	OF	Yes
Aaron Kurcz	2015–2017	P	No
Joe Kuzia	2019	P	No
Tyler Ladendorf	2015–2016	OF/SS	Yes
Aaron Laffey	2013	P	Yes
Mike Laga	1985–1986	1B	Yes
Jeff Lahti	1979	P	Yes
Tim Laker	1998–2000	C	Yes
Blake Lalli	2013	C	Yes
Ryan LaMarre	2017	CF	Yes
Andrew Lambo	2016–2017	LF/DH	Yes
Luis Landaeta	2002	LF	No
Bill Landrum	1987	P	Yes
Tito Landrum	1989	OF	Yes
Brian Lane	1990, 1992	3B	No
Luis Lara	2026	CF	Yes
Barry Larkin^{†} (Note: Barry Larkin: NL Most Valuable Player (1995), Roberto Clemente Award (1993), NL Gold Glove (1994, 1995, 1996), NL Silver Slugger (1989, 1990, 1991, 1992, 1995, 1996, 1998, 1999), NL All-Star (1989, 1990, 1991, 1993, 1994, 1995, 1996, 1997, 1999, 2000, 2004), National Baseball Hall of Fame (2012))	1989	SS	Yes
Eric Lauer	2021, 2023	P	Yes
Ramón Laureano	2018	RF/CF	Yes
Ryan Lavarnway	2017	C	Yes
Sean Lawrence	1998	P	Yes
Tim Layana	1991	P	Yes
Joe Lazor	1990	P	No
Jack Lazorko	1986	P	Yes
Brent Leach	2013–2014	P	Yes
Terry Leach	1993	P	Yes
Werner Leal	2019	P	No
Wade LeBlanc	2021	P	Yes
Dan Ledduke	1980–1981	P	No
Terry Lee	1989–1991	1B	Yes
Justin Lehr	2005–2006	P	Yes
Chris Lein	1982	P	No
Scott Leius	1997	3B/DH	Yes
Jake Lemoine	2019	P	Yes
Arcenio León	2014	P	Yes
Arnold León	2015	P	Yes
Danilo León	2000	P	Yes
Eddys Leonard	2026	2B/LF	Yes
Al Levine	1994–1997	P	Yes
Timothy Lewis	1980–1981	P	No
Mike Lincoln	2001–2003	P	Yes
Josh Lindblom	2021–2022	P	Yes
Bill Lindsey	1983–1984	C	Yes
Doug Lindsey	1994	C	Yes
Matt Lipka	2021–2022	CF	No
Jesús Liranzo	2025	P	No
Wes Littleton	2009	P	Yes
Kyle Lobstein	2021	P	Yes
Keith Lockhart	1989–1991	2B	Yes
Brandon Lockridge	2025–2026	CF	Yes
Kameron Loe	2010	P	Yes
Chuck Lofgren	2010	P	No
Rich Loiselle	1998, 2000–2001	P	Yes
Rick Lombardo	1978–1979	P	No
Chris Lombardozzi	1990	3B/2B	No
Steve Lombardozzi Jr.	2018	1B/2B	Yes
Joey Long	1999	P	Yes
Nate Long	2015	P	No
Mitch Longo	2021	RF	No
Brian Looney	2002	P	Yes
Christian Lopes	2019	2B/OF	Yes
Tim Lopes	2021	OF	Yes
Felipe López	2011	2B/3B	Yes
Mendy López	2002	SS/3B	Yes
Rob Lopez	1987–1991	P	No
Andrew Lorraine	1995	P	Yes
Johnnie Lowe	2012–2014	P	No
Sean Lowe	2002	P	Yes
Jed Lowrie^{†} (Note: Jed Lowrie: AL All-Star (2018))	2016	2B	Yes
Dwight Lowry	1985–1986	C	Yes
Josh Lucas	2018	P	Yes
Jonathan Lucroy^{†} (Note: Jonathan Lucroy: NL All-Star (2014, 2016))	2010, 2012	C	Yes
Jesus Lujano	2021	PH/CF	No
Jesús Luzardo^{†} (Note: Jesús Luzardo: NL All-Star (2026), All-MLB Second Team (2026))	2018	P	Yes
Don Lyle	1978	OF	No
David Lynch	1992	P	No
Barry Lyons	1995	C/DH	Yes
Chris Mabeus	2006	P	Yes
Bob MacDonald	1994	P	Yes
Anderson Machado	2011	SS	Yes
Robert Machado	1995, 1997	C	Yes
José Macías	2007	OF	Yes
Josh Maciejewski	2025	P	Yes
Rob Mackowiak	2001, 2003	1B	Yes
Scotti Madison	1985–1986, 1989	1B	Yes
Joe Magrane	1996	P	Yes
Mickey Mahler	1985	P	Yes
Rick Mahler	1990	P	Yes
Pat Mahomes	2003–2004	P	Yes
Luke Maile	2021	C	Yes
Martín Maldonado^{†} (Note: Martín Maldonado: NL Gold Glove (2017))	2009–2012	C	Yes
Sean Manaea	2016–2017	P	Yes
Seth Maness	2019	P	Yes
Mike Manfre	1987	OF	No
Mark Manfredi	2026	P	Yes
Brandon Mann	2016	P	Yes
Jim Mann	2003–2004	P	Yes
Hank Manning	1994	C	No
Josías Manzanillo	2000, 2002	P	Yes
Bob Mariano	1981	3B	No
Isidro Márquez	1994–1995	P	Yes
Dámaso Marte	2001	P	Yes
Brett Martin	2019	P	Yes
Cody Martin	2015	P	Yes
Corbin Martin	2024	P	Yes
Greg Martin	2004	P	No
Jarret Martin	2018–2019	P	No
Norberto Martin	1993–1994, 1996	2B	Yes
Daniel Martinez	2018	P	No
Domingo Martínez	1994	1B	Yes
Ernesto Martinez Jr.	2025	1B	No
Manny Martínez	1998	CF	Yes
Nick Martini	2018	1B/OF	Yes
Eric Marzec	2011, 2014	P	No
Víctor Mata	1983	OF/2B	Yes
Jorge Mateo	2018	SS	Yes
Rubén Mateo	2004	OF	Yes
Del Mathews	1998	P	No
Mark Mathias	2022	2B/3B	Yes
Luis Matos	2026	RF/LF	Yes
Kent Matthes	2015	RF	No
Don Mattingly^{†} (Note: Don Mattingly: AL Most Valuable Player (1985), NL Manager of the Year (2020), AL Gold Glove (1985, 1986, 1987, 1988, 1989, 1991, 1992, 1993, 1994), AL Silver Slugger (1985, 1986, 1987), AL All-Star (1984, 1985, 1986, 1987, 1988, 1989))	1981	1B/OF	Yes
Kevin Mattison	2014	CF	Yes
Rob Mattson	2000	P	No
Bruce Maxwell	2016–2018	C	Yes
Lucas May	2014	C	Yes
Bob Mayer	1978–1979	P	No
Edwin Maysonet	2011–2012	SS	Yes
Matt McBride	2016–2017	C	Yes
Lloyd McClendon	1987–1988	1B/DH	Yes
Mike McClendon	2010–2012	P	Yes
Seth McClung	2007, 2012	P	Yes
Sam McConnell	2000–2001	P	Yes
Jeff McCurry	1998	P	Yes
Neal McDade	2001	P	No
Terry McDaniel	1992	OF	Yes
Keith McDonald	2004	C	Yes
Will McEnaney	1980	P	Yes
Andy McGaffigan	1980	P	Yes
Easton McGee	2024–2026	P	Yes
Willie McGee^{†} (Note: Willie McGee: NL Most Valuable Player (1985), NL Gold Glove (1983, 1985, 1986), NL Silver Slugger (1985), NL All-Star (1983, 1985, 1987, 1988))	1980–1981	OF	Yes
Terry McGriff	1987–1990	C	Yes
Aiden McIntyre	2018	P	No
Evan McKendry	2023–2025	P	No
Tony McKnight	2002	P	Yes
Marty McLeary	2010	P	Yes
Derwin McNealy	1983	OF	No
Sam McWilliams	2024–2025	P	No
Bobby Meacham	1984	SS	Yes
Rusty Meacham	1998	P	Yes
Brian Meadows	2002–2003	P	Yes
Dan Meadows	2011–2012	P	No
Pat Meares	1999	SS	Yes
Nick Mears	2025	P	Yes
James Meeker	2023–2024	P	Yes
Trevor Megill^{†} (Note: Trevor Megill: NL All-Star (2025))	2023–2024	P	Yes
Francisco Mejía	2024	C	Yes
J. C. Mejía	2022–2023	P	Yes
Bob Melvin^{†} (Note: Bob Melvin: NL Manager of the Year (2007), AL Manager of the Year (2012, 2018))	1985	C	Yes
Yohander Méndez	2019	P	Yes
Kevin Mendoza	2019	C/2B	No
Frank Menechino	1997	2B	Yes
Gene Menees	1978–1979	2B	No
Tony Menéndez	1992	P	Yes
Daniel Mengden	2016–2018	P	Yes
Melvin Mercedes	2017–2018	2B	No
Mark Merchant	1996	DH	No
Frank Merigliano	1993	P	No
Dan Merklinger	2010	P	No
Julian Merryweather	2025	P	Yes
Matt Merullo	1993	C	Yes
Ben Metzinger	2024	PH	No
Dan Meyer	1985	DH	Yes
Mike Meyers	2005–2006	P	No
Ryan Middendorf	2023–2025	P	No
Bob Milacki	1999	P	Yes
Matt Milburn	2018	P	No
Wade Miley	2024	P	Yes
Darrien Miller	2026	C	No
Mark Miller	1978–1979	C	No
Owen Miller	2023–2024	1B	Yes
Shelby Miller	2025	P	Yes
Tyson Miller	2023	P	Yes
Brad Mills	2014–2015	P	Yes
Eddie Milner	1979, 1988	OF	Yes
Hoby Milner	2021	P	Yes
David Milstien	1994–1995	SS/3B	No
Steve Mintz	1998	P	Yes
Gino Minutelli	1990–1992	P	Yes
Geovany Miranda	1994	3B	No
Jacob Misiorowski^{†} (Note: Jacob Misiorowski: NL Cy Young Award (2026), NL All-Star (2025, 2026), All-MLB First Team (2026))	2024–2025	P	Yes
Bobby Mitchell	1985	OF	Yes
Charlie Mitchell	1988–1991	P	Yes
Garrett Mitchell	2022–2025	CF	Yes
Chad Moeller	2006	C	Yes
Sam Moll	2017	P	Yes
Dustin Molleken	2013–2014	P	Yes
Shane Monahan	2001	LF	Yes
Andruw Monasterio	2022–2025	SS	Yes
Greg Monda	1988	1B	No
Sid Monge	1985	P	Yes
Mike Mongiello	1993–1995	P	No
Frankie Montas	2017–2018	P	Yes
Rich Monteleone	1985	P	Yes
Rafael Montero	2019	P	Yes
Jeff Montgomery^{†} (Note: Jeff Montgomery: AL Relief Man (1993), AL All-Star (1992, 1993, 1996))	1987	P	Yes
Ray Montgomery	1999–2000	LF/RF	Yes
Eric Moody	2001	P	Yes
Adam Moore	2019	C	Yes
Bobby Moore	1990	P	Yes
Charles Moorman	2019	C	No
Richard Morban	2018	P	No
Brent Morel	2015	3B	Yes
Tony Moretto	1978	OF	No
Mike Morgan^{†} (Note: Mike Morgan: NL All-Star (1991))	1981	P	Yes
Nyjer Morgan	2011	CF/RF	Yes
Mike Moriarty	2004	2B/SS	Yes
Russ Morman	1992	1B	Yes
Hal Morris	1990, 1992	OF	Yes
Hunter Morris	2013–2014	1B	No
Warren Morris	2001, 2005	2B	Yes
Julio Mosquera	2005	C	Yes
Darryl Motley	1990	OF	Yes
Ryan Mottl	2004	P	No
Lyle Mouton	1995	LF	Yes
Max Muncy^{†} (Note: Max Muncy: NL All-Star (2019, 2021, 2026))	2015–2016	3B	Yes
Brian Munhall	2007*	C	No
Jose Munoz	1996	2B	Yes
Yairo Muñoz	2017	SS/OF	Yes
Eric Munson	2008	1B/C	Yes
Sean Murphy^{†} (Note: Sean Murphy: AL Gold Glove (2021))	2018	C	Yes
A. J. Murray	2010	P	Yes
Ethan Murray	2025–2026	2B	No
Tobias Myers	2023–2025	P	Yes
James Naile	2016, 2018	P	Yes
Tyler Naquin	2023	RF	Yes
Sam Narron	2008–2011	P	Yes
Omar Narváez	2022	C/DH	Yes
Chris Narveson	2008–2009, 2013	P	Yes
Andrick Nava	2026	C	No
Brian Navarreto	2022–2024	C	Yes
Carlos Navas	2016	P	No
Bo Naylor	2026	C	Yes
Zach Neal	2015–2017	P	Yes
Brad Nelson	2005–2008	1B	Yes
Bryant Nelson	2001	2B	Yes
Douglas Nelson	1978	P	No
Jerome Nelson	1990	OF	No
Jimmy Nelson	2013–2014	P	Yes
Sheldon Neuse	2018	3B	Yes
Warren Newson	1993	OF	Yes
Scott Nielsen	1984	P	Yes
Wil Nieves	2011	C	Yes
Vinny Nittoli	2025	P	Yes
Laynce Nix	2006–2008	CF/RF	Yes
Otis Nixon	1981–1982	SS	Yes
Paul Noce	1990	SS	Yes
Matt Nokes^{†} (Note: Matt Nokes: AL Silver Slugger (1987), AL All-Star (1987))	1986	C	Yes
Sean Nolin	2015	P	Yes
Rey Noriega	1995	SS	No
Greg Norton	1996–1997	3B/SS	Yes
Rafael Novoa	1995	P	Yes
Chris Nowak	2011	3B	No
Abraham Núñez	1998–2000, 2002, 2008	SS	Yes
Franklin Núñez	2007	P	Yes
Renato Núñez	2016–2018, 2021	3B	Yes
Chris Nyman	1986	1B	Yes
Wes Obermueller	2005	P	Yes
Brian O'Connor	2000–2002	P	Yes
Rougned Odor	2019	2B	Yes
Trent Oeltjen	2010	LF	Yes
Ron Oester	1988	2B	Yes
Eric O'Flaherty	2015	P	Yes
Danny Oh	2016*	RF	No
Rick O'Keeffe	1978–1979	P	No
Jared Oliva	2025	RF/CF	Yes
Joe Oliver	1988–1989	C	Yes
Steve Oliverio	1988	P	No
Ray Olmedo	2010	2B	Yes
Michael Olmsted	2013	P	No
Steve Olsen	1994	P	No
Matt Olson^{†} (Note: Matt Olson: AL Gold Glove (2018, 2019), NL Gold Glove (2025, 2026), NL Silver Slugger (2023, 2026), AL All-Star (2021), NL All-Star (2025, 2026))	2016–2017	1B/RF	Yes
Eddie Olszta	2004	PH	No
Ed Olwine	1983	P	Yes
Tom O'Malley	1985	3B	Yes
Randy O'Neal	1985–1986	P	Yes
Paul O'Neill^{†} (Note: Paul O'Neill: NL All-Star (1991), AL All-Star (1994, 1995, 1997, 1998))	1987, 1989	OF	Yes
Magglio Ordóñez^{†} (Note: Magglio Ordóñez: AL Silver Slugger (2000, 2002, 2007), AL All-Star (1999, 2000, 2001, 2003, 2006, 2007))	1997	CF/RF	Yes
Kevin Orie	2005	3B/DH	Yes
Jonathan Ornelas	2026	3B	Yes
Pete Orr	2014	2B	Yes
Javier Ortiz	1994–1995	OF	Yes
Junior Ortiz	1995	C	Yes
Keith Osik	1999	C/RF	Yes
Gavin Osteen	2000	P	No
Andy Otero	2021–2022	P	No
Dan Otero	2015	P	Yes
Dillon Overton	2016	P	Yes
Chris Oxspring	2007	P	Yes
John Pacella	1985–1986	P	Yes
Pat Pacillo	1987–1988	P	Yes
Joey Paciorek	2013	DH	No
Emilio Pagán	2018	P	Yes
Mike Pagliarulo	1983	3B	Yes
Matt Pagnozzi	2014	C	Yes
Donn Pall	1995	P	Yes
Joe Palumbo	2019	P	Yes
Thomas Pannone	2023, 2026	P	Yes
Enoli Paredes	2024	P	Yes
Freddy Parejo	2009	LF	No
Jarrod Parker	2015	P	Yes
Stephen Parker	2013	3B	No
Chris Parmelee	2017	DH/OF	Yes
Chad Paronto	2005	P	Yes
Jim Parque	1997	P	Yes
José Parra	2000	P	Yes
Manny Parra	2007, 2009, 2011	P	Yes
Andy Parrino	2015	SS	Yes
Dan Pasqua	1984	OF	Yes
Frank Pastore	1978	P	Yes
Joe Paterson	2015	P	Yes
Chad Patrick	2024–2025	P	Yes
Corey Patterson	2009, 2012	LF	Yes
Jarrod Patterson	2000	3B	Yes
Scott Patterson	1983–1984	P	No
Jeff Patzke	1998–1999	2B	No
Dave Pavlas	2000–2001	P	Yes
Joel Payamps	2025	P	Yes
Pedro Payano	2019	P	Yes
Eddie Pearson	1997	1B	No
Kevin Pearson	1989–1991	3B/OF	No
Elvis Peguero	2023–2025	P	Yes
C. D. Pelham	2019	P	Yes
Ariel Peña	2014	P	Yes
Luis Peña	2008	P	No
Richelson Peña	2019	P	No
Freddy Peralta^{†} (Note: Freddy Peralta: AL Championship Series Most Valuable Player (2026), All-MLB Second Team (2025))	2022	P	Yes
Sammy Peralta	2026	P	Yes
Wily Peralta	2011–2012	P	Yes
Ángel Perdomo	2021–2022	P	Yes
Luis Perdomo	2022	P	Yes
Hernán Pérez	2021	SS	Yes
Juan Pérez	2012	P	Yes
Blake Perkins	2023, 2025–2026	CF	Yes
Chan Perry	2003	1B	Yes
Chris Peters	1999–2000	P	Yes
Tanner Peters	2015	P	No
Chris Petersen	2001	2B	Yes
Charles Peterson	1998	RF	No
Dustin Peterson	2021–2022	LF	Yes
Erik Peterson	1981–1984	3B	No
Jace Peterson	2021	2B	Yes
Nate Peterson	2025	P	No
Jake Petricka	2019	P	Yes
Ike Pettaway	1983	P	No
Adam Pettyjohn	2007	P	Yes
Josh Phegley	2016–2018	C/DH	Yes
Tommy Phelps	2005	P	Yes
Jason Phillips	1998–2000	P	Yes
Paul Phillips	2012	C	Yes
Kevin Pickford	1998	P	Yes
Tyler Pill	2019	RF/DH	Yes
Chad Pinder	2016–2017	SS	Yes
Chris Pittaro	1985	3B	Yes
Joe Pittman	1985	3B	Yes
Kevin Polcovich	1999	SS	Yes
Brian Poldberg	1981–1982	C	No
Wil Polidor	1997	2B	No
Scott Pose	1991	OF	Yes
Dave Post	2002	2B	No
Boog Powell	2017–2018	RF/CF	Yes
Dennis Powell	1994	P	Yes
Ross Powell	1990–1992	P	Yes
Andy Pratt	2005	P	Yes
Cooper Pratt	2026	SS	Yes
Rich Pratt	1997	P	No
Joe Price	1978–1979	P	Yes
Curtis Pride	2002	LF	Yes
Jason Pridie	2015	RF/LF	Yes
Quinn Priester	2026	P	Yes
Ariel Prieto	2003	P	Yes
Josh Prince	2013	CF	Yes
Chris Pritchett	2002	1B	Yes
Juremi Profar	2019	1B	No
Buddy Pryor	1987–1988	C	No
Tim Pugh	1991–1992	P	Yes
Garry Pyka	1978	2B	No
Jeferson Quero	2024–2026	C/DH	Yes
Joshua Quezada	2026	P	No
Roman Quinn	2023	CF	Yes
Luis Quiñones	1988–1989	SS	Yes
Humberto Quintero	2012	C	Yes
Johnny Raburn	2009–2010	2B	No
Ryan Radmanovich	2001–2002	LF/RF	Yes
Bob Raftice	1983	P	No
Tim Raines^{†} (Note: Tim Raines: National Baseball Hall of Fame (2017))	1993	OF/DH	Yes
Aramis Ramírez^{†} (Note: Aramis Ramírez: NL Hank Aaron Award (2008), NL All-Star (2005, 2008, 2014))	1998–2000	3B	Yes
Carlos Ramírez	2018	P	Yes
Erasmo Ramirez	2008	P	Yes
Fernando Ramsey	1995–1996	CF	Yes
Jim Rasmussen	1983–1985	P	No
Fred Rath Jr.	2000	P	Yes
Rangel Ravelo	2015–2016	1B	Yes
Corey Ray	2021–2022	CF	Yes
Ken Ray	2007	P	Yes
Colin Rea	2021, 2023	P	Yes
Jeff Reboulet	2003	SS	Yes
Josh Reddick	2016	RF/DH	Yes
Mike Reddish	1983	OF	No
Tike Redman	2000–2003, 2009	CF	Yes
Gary Redus	1979	OF	Yes
Jeff Reed	1992	C	Yes
Jeremy Reed	2011	RF/LF	Yes
Michael Reed	2023	LF	No
Jakson Reetz	2022	C/LF	Yes
Justin Reid	2003–2004	P	No
Jerry Reuss	1987	P	Yes
Al Reyes	2002	P	Yes
José Reyes	1998	C	No
Pablo Reyes	2021–2022	2B	Yes
Jeff Reynolds	1982, 1989	OF/3B	No
Frank Ricci	1981–1982	P	No
Jeff Richardson	1989	SS	Yes
Lyon Richardson	2026	P	Yes
Nick Rickles	2015	C	No
Dave Righetti	1995	P	Yes
José Rijo^{†} (Note: José Rijo: World Series Most Valuable Player (1990), NL All-Star (1994))	1983, 1990	P	Yes
Ricardo Rincón	1998	P	Yes
Armando Ríos	2002	RF	Yes
David Riske	2008, 2010	P	Yes
Bill Risley	1991	P	Yes
Todd Ritchie	1999	P	Yes
Amaury Rivas	2011–2012	P	No
Carlos Rivera	2003–2004	1B	Yes
Germán Rivera	1986	3B	Yes
Mike Rivera	2005–2007, 2009, 2011	C	Yes
Todd Rizzo	1997	P	Yes
Donn Roach	2016*	P	Yes
Wes Robbins	1981	DH/2B	No
Leon Roberts	1985	OF	Yes
Ryan Roberts	2015	3B	Yes
Willis Roberts	2004	P	Yes
Andre Robertson	1980	SS	Yes
Daniel Robertson	2021	SS/3B	Yes
Mike Robertson	1994–1996, 1999	1B	Yes
Rich Robertson	1999	P	Yes
Brian Robinson	1987	2B/SS	No
Cam Robinson	2022–2023	P	No
Jeff Robinson	1986	P	Yes
Ron Robinson	1988–1989	P	Yes
Nilson Robledo	1996	1B	No
Carlos Rodríguez	2023–2026	P	Yes
Carlos D. Rodriguez	2024	LF/RF	No
Edwin Rodríguez	1982	SS	Yes
Elvin Rodríguez	2025	P	Yes
Fernando Rodriguez	2015	P	Yes
Francisco Rodríguez^{†} (Note: Francisco Rodríguez: NL All-Star (2014, 2015))	2013	P	Yes
Josh Rodriguez	2016	SS	Yes
Ramón Rodríguez	2026	C	No
Rosario Rodríguez	1990	P	Yes
Ron Roenicke	1988	OF	Yes
Mike Roesler	1988–1989	P	Yes
Jason Rogers	2014	3B	Yes
Mark Rogers	2010–2012	P	Yes
Chris Roller	2023–2024	CF	Yes
Franklin Rollin	2019	LF	No
Drew Rom	2026	P	Yes
Mandy Romero	2002	C	Yes
Niuman Romero	2015	SS	Yes
Gene Roof	1986	OF	Yes
Rolando Roomes	1989	OF	Yes
Luis Rosado	1985	C	Yes
Eddie Rosario	2025	LF	Yes
Pete Rose Jr.	1998	1B/3B	Yes
John Rosengren	2000	P	No
Trevor Rosenthal	2022	P	Yes
Joe Ross	2024	P	Yes
Larry Rothschild	1978	P	Yes
Vinny Rottino	2005–2008	C	Yes
Darin Ruf	2023	DH/1B	Yes
Scott Ruffcorn	1993–1996	P	Yes
Johnny Ruffin	1993	P	Yes
Esteury Ruiz	2022	LF/CF	Yes
Norge Ruiz	2018	P	Yes
Jason Ryan	2001	P	Yes
Ken Ryan	1999	P	Yes
Matt Ryan	1998–1999	P	No
Brian Ryder	1980	P	No
Chris Sabo^{†} (Note: Chris Sabo: NL Rookie of the Year (1988), NL All-Star (1988, 1990, 1991))	1987, 1989, 1992	3B	Yes
Connor Sadzeck	2021–2022	P	Yes
Olmedo Sáenz	1994–1996	3B	Yes
Takashi Saito	2011	P	Yes
Jim Sak	2000	P	No
Marino Salas	2007	P	Yes
Mark Salas	1982	C	Yes
Ángel Salomé	2009–2010	C	Yes
Alejandro Sánchez	1985	OF	Yes
Duaner Sánchez	2002–2003	P	Yes
Freddy Sanchez^{†} (Note: Freddy Sanchez: NL All-Star (2006, 2007, 2009))	2003–2004	2B	Yes
Gary Sánchez	2024	C/DH	Yes
Jake Sanchez	2015, 2017–2018	P	No
Jesús Sánchez	2012–2013	P	No
Juan Sánchez	2011–2012	PH/OF	No
Miguel Sánchez	2021–2022	P	Yes
Tracy Sanders	2000	1B	No
Juan Sandoval	2009	P	No
Chance Sanford	1998	2B	Yes
Mo Sanford	1991–1992	P	Yes
Danny Santana	2019	SS/RF	Yes
Julio Santana	2005	P	Yes
Rafael Santana	1980	SS	Yes
Rafael Santo Domingo	1978–1979	1B	Yes
Eduard Santos	2016	P	No
Dennis Sarfate	2005–2007	P	Yes
Scott Sauerbeck	2000	P	Yes
Rich Sauveur	1996, 1998–1999	P	Yes
Dalton Sawyer	2017	P	No
Steve Scarborough	2005	SS	No
Logan Schafer	2011–2012, 2014	CF	Yes
Gene Schall	1997	DH	Yes
Bill Scherrer	1986–1987	P	Yes
Jason Schmidt^{†} (Note: Jason Schmidt: NL All-Star (2003, 2004, 2006))	2001	P	Yes
Danny Schmitz	1980, 1982	SS/3B	No
Steve Schrenk	1993–1994, 1996	P	Yes
Jeff Schulz	1992	OF	Yes
Patrick Schuster	2016–2017	P	Yes
Jeff Schwarz	1993–1994	P	Yes
Dick Scott	1984	3B	Yes
Donnie Scott	1990–1991	C	Yes
Kelly Scott	1982–1983	P	No
Tim Scott	1999	P	Yes
Scott Scudder	1989–1990	P	Yes
Bob Sebra	1989–1990	P	Yes
Reed Secrist	1999, 2001–2002	3B	No
Joel Seddon	2017	P	No
Zack Segovia	2011	P	Yes
José Segura	1992	P	Yes
R. J. Seidel	2013	P	No
Anthony Seigler	2025	2B/C	Yes
Jeff Sellers	1989	P	Yes
Marcus Semien^{†} (Note: Marcus Semien: AL Gold Glove (2021, 2025), AL Silver Slugger (2021, 2023), AL All-Star (2021, 2024), All-MLB First Team (2021))	2017	SS/DH	Yes
Adam Seminaris	2023	P	No
Jack Seppings	2026	P	No
Dan Serafini	2000	P	Yes
Gary Serum	1982	P	Yes
Scott Service	1992, 2002	P	Yes
Pedro Severino	2022	C/DH	Yes
Ben Shaffar	2002–2003	P	No
Kevin Shannon	1981	C	No
Travis Shaw	2021	3B	Yes
Ben Sheets^{†} (Note: Ben Sheets: NL All-Star (2007, 2008))	2006	P	Yes
Scott Sheldon	2004	OF	Yes
Pat Sheridan	1986	OF	Yes
Jason Shiell	2008	P	Yes
Mark Shiflett	1983–1984	P	No
Steve Shirley	1985	P	Yes
Buck Showalter^{†} (Note: Buck Showalter: AL Manager of the Year (1994, 2004, 2014), NL Manager of the Year (2022))	1980–1983	1B	No
Terry Shumpert	2004	2B	Yes
Candy Sierra	1988	P	Yes
José Silva	1998–1999	P	Yes
Mark Silva	1983–1984	P	No
Bill Simas	1995	P	Yes
Nelson Simmons	1985–1986	OF	Yes
Randall Simon	2003–2004	1B/DH	Yes
Allan Simpson	2006	P	Yes
Jon Singleton	2022–2023	1B	Yes
Mike Sirotka	1995–1997	P	Yes
Shaun Skrehot	2001, 2004	SS	No
Matt Skrmetta	2000	P	Yes
Roger Slagle	1980–1982	P	Yes
Ethan Small	2021–2023	P	Yes
Jeff Small	1992	2B	No
Brian Smith	2001–2002	P	Yes
Chad Smith	2015	P	Yes
Chris Smith	2009–2010, 2016–2017	P	Yes
Chuck Smith	1996–1997	P	Yes
Garry Smith	1980, 1982	OF	No
Josh Smith	2017	P	Yes
Keith Smith	1982–1984	SS	Yes
Ken Smith	1981–1982	P	No
Mark Smith	1998	RF/1B	Yes
Mark S. Smith	1985	OF	No
Shane Smith^{†} (Note: Shane Smith: AL All-Star (2025))	2024	P	Yes
Jake Smolinski	2015–2018	CF	Yes
Nate Snell	1988	P	Yes
Van Snider	1988–1989	OF	Yes
Chris Snopek	1995–1997	SS	Yes
Chris Snusz	2003–2004	C	No
Chad Sobotka	2021	P	Yes
Tom Sohns	1978–1979	SS	No
Nick Solak	2019	2B	Yes
Steve Sollmann	2008	2B	No
Zach Sorensen	2006	2B	Yes
Mario Soto	1987	P	Yes
Bennett Sousa	2023	P	Yes
Garrett Spain	2025	RF	No
Chad Spanberger	2021	RF	No
Jeff Sparks	1999	P	Yes
Steve Sparks	2001	P	Yes
J. P. Sportman	2018	2B	No
Gary Springer	1986	DH	No
Jeffrey Springs	2019	P	Yes
Brandon Sproat	2026	P	Yes
Chris Spurling	2007	P	Yes
Randy St. Claire	1988	P	Yes
Locke St. John	2019	P	Yes
Matt Stairs	2003	RF/1B	Yes
Garrett Stallings	2024–2026	P	Yes
Hainley Statia	2012–2014	2B	No
T. J. Staton	1998	LF/RF	No
Blake Stein	2004	P	Yes
Adam Stern	2009–2010	LF	Yes
Mitch Stetter	2005–2008, 2010–2012	P	Yes
Cory Stewart	2004	P	No
Dave Stieb	1993	P	Yes
Robert Stock	2023	P	Yes
Mel Stocker	2008	LF	Yes
Bob Stoddard	1985	P	Yes
Troy Stokes Jr.	2021	RF	Yes
Jeff Stone	1992	OF	Yes
Doug Strange	1999	2B	Yes
Dee Strange-Gordon	2021	SS/2B	Yes
Peter Strzelecki	2021–2023, 2026	P	Yes
Cody Stull	2016	P	No
Tyler Sturdevant	2017	P	Yes
Jeff Suppan	2009	P	Yes
Eric Surkamp	2016	P	Yes
Glenn Sutko	1991	C	Yes
Dale Sveum	1999	SS	Yes
Jon Sweet	1998	C	No
R. J. Swindle	2009	P	Yes
Bob Sykes	1982	P	Yes
Dave Szymczak	1983	P	No
Jeff Tabaka	1998	P	Yes
Pat Tabler^{†} (Note: Pat Tabler: AL All-Star (1987))	1980	2B	Yes
Eddie Tanner	1987–1990	1B	No
Beau Taylor	2017–2018	C	Yes
Billy Taylor	2001	P	Yes
Dwight Taylor	1992	OF	Yes
Jeff Taylor	1980–1981	P	No
Steve Taylor	1980–1981	P	No
Tyrone Taylor	2021–2023	CF	Yes
Scott Tedder	1993	OF	No
Rob Teegarden	1981, 1983	OF/DH	No
Julio Teherán	2023	P	Yes
Rowdy Tellez	2021, 2023	1B/DH	Yes
Nick Tepesch	2016	P	Yes
Scott Terry	1987	P	Yes
Bob Tewksbury^{†} (Note: Bob Tewksbury: NL All-Star (1992))	1983–1984	P	Yes
Joe Thatcher	2007	P	Yes
Bobby Thigpen	1996	P	Yes
Steve Thobe	1998	1B/P	No
Charles Thomas	2007	CF/RF	Yes
Larry Thomas	1993, 1997	P	Yes
Darrell Thompson	2023–2024	P	No
Justin Thompson	2006	P	Yes
Rich Thompson	2003–2004	OF	Yes
Taylor Thompson	2015	P	Yes
Tyler Thornburg	2012–2013	P	Yes
Corey Thurman	2006	P	Yes
Gary Thurman	1994	OF	Yes
Ron Tingley	1994	C	Yes
Jorge Toca	2003	1B	Yes
Carlos Tocci	2019	CF	Yes
Kevin Tolar	1998, 2002	P	Yes
Tim Tolman	1986	OF	Yes
Chuck Tomaselli	1984	P	No
Justin Topa	2021–2022	P	Yes
Abraham Toro	2023	3B	Yes
Melqui Torres	2008	P	No
Salomón Torres	2002–2003	P	Yes
Quintin Torres-Costa	2021	P	No
Randy Town	1979	P	No
Todd Trafton	1991–1992	OF	No
Jeff Treadway	1987	2B	Yes
Chris Tremie	1995–1996, 1999	C	Yes
Jose Trevino^{†} (Note: Jose Trevino: AL Gold Glove (2022), AL All-Star (2022))	2019	C	Yes
Andrew Triggs	2016	P	Yes
Lou Trivino	2017–2018	P	Yes
Chris Truby	2004	3B	Yes
Brice Turang^{†} (Note: Brice Turang: NL Gold Glove (2024, 2026), All-MLB First Team (2026), All-MLB Second Team (2025))	2021–2023	SS	Yes
Joe Turek	1991	P	No
Derrick Turnbow	2008	P	Yes
Jason Tyner	2009	LF	Yes
Nic Ungs	2008	P	No
Luis Urías	2023, 2025	3B/2B	Yes
Abner Uribe	2023–2024	P	Yes
César Valdez	2017	P	Yes
Mario Valdez	1997	1B	Yes
Phillips Valdéz	2019	P	Yes
Kerry Valrie	1995–1996	RF	No
John Van Benschoten	2004	P	Yes
Dave Van Gorder	1978–1979	C	Yes
Todd Van Poppel	1999	P	Yes
Josh VanMeter	2023	2B/DH	Yes
Claudio Vargas	2012	P	Yes
Eddie Vargas	1988	1B/DH	Yes
Jheremy Vargas	2026	2B/LF/RF	No
Gus Varland	2023	P	Yes
Esmerling Vásquez	2019	P	Yes
Luis Vasquez	1989–1991	P	No
Andrew Vaughn	2025–2026	1B/DH	Yes
Eugenio Vélez	2013–2014	2B/LF	Yes
Victor Veliz	2015	P	No
Max Venable	1987	OF	Yes
Pat Venditte	2015	P	Yes
Zach Vennaro	2022	P	No
Robin Ventura^{†} (Note: Robin Ventura: AL Gold Glove (1998, 1999), AL All-Star (2002))	1997	3B	Yes
Ryan Verdugo	2015	P	Yes
Brett Vertigan	2018	LF/RF	No
Dayán Viciedo	2015	DH/1B	Yes
Thyago Vieira	2023	P	Yes
Hasuan Viera	2019	LF/CF	No
Joey Vierra	1990–1992, 1994–1995	P	No
Rafael Villaman	1981–1982	2B/SS	No
Mike Villano	2000	P	No
Carlos Villanueva	2006–2007, 2010	P	Yes
Luis Villarreal	2007	P	No
Julio Vinas	1996–1997	C	No
Daniel Vogelbach	2021	1B	Yes
Ryan Vogelsong^{†} (Note: Ryan Vogelsong: NL All-Star (2011))	2001, 2003	P	Yes
Paul Voigt	1985	P	No
Luke Voit	2023	1B/DH	Yes
Cameron Wagoner	2026	P	No
Jacob Waguespack	2026	P	Yes
Bobby Wahl	2016–2018, 2021	P	Yes
Marcus Walden	2022	P	Yes
Bernie Walker	1987, 1989, 1991	OF	No
Duane Walker	1978–1979	OF	Yes
Jeff Wallace	1999–2000	P	Yes
Colin Walsh	2016	LF	Yes
Corey Walter	2017	P	No
Nash Walters	2022	P	Yes
Daryle Ward	2004	1B	Yes
Nick Ward	2018	2B	No
Turner Ward	1999	LF/DH	Yes
John Wasdin	2003	P	Yes
Chris Waters	2010	P	Yes
Jeff Weaver	2008	P	Yes
Travis Webb	2013	P	No
Ryan Weber	2021	P	Yes
Rickie Weeks Jr.^{†} (Note: Rickie Weeks: NL All-Star (2011))	2005, 2007	2B	Yes
John Wehner	1999–2000	2B	Yes
Clint Weibl	2005	P	No
George Weicker	1978	1B	No
Patrick Weigel	2021	P	Yes
Adam Weisenburger	2014	C	No
J. B. Wendelken	2016, 2018	P	Yes
Joey Wendle^{†} (Note: Joey Wendle: AL All-Star (2021))	2015–2017	2B	Yes
Don Wengert	2001	P	Yes
Jamie Werly	1980–1981, 1983	P	No
Don Werner	1985	C	Yes
Dennis Werth	1981	C	Yes
Jamie Westbrook	2021–2022	2B	Yes
Stefan Wever	1981–1982	P	Yes
Gary Wex	1984	P	No
Zelous Wheeler	2011	3B	Yes
Kevin Whelan	2015	P	Yes
Eli White	2019	SS	Yes
Mitch White	2024	P	Yes
Tyler White	2022	DH/1B	Yes
Garrett Whitley	2022	CF/RF	No
Darrell Whitmore	1998	RF	Yes
Brett Wichrowski	2026	P	No
Scott Wiegandt	1998	P	No
Joey Wiemer	2022–2024	RF/CF	Yes
Ted Wilborn	1980–1981, 1985	OF	Yes
Brock Wilken	2026	1B/3B	No
Marc Wilkins	1998–2001	P	Yes
Joel Willett	1979	P	No
Adrian Williams	2012	DH/2B	No
David Williams	2001, 2003–2004	P	Yes
Devin Williams	2024	P	Yes
Frank Williams	1988	P	Yes
Jeff Williams	1984	OF	No
Jett Williams	2026	3B	No
Mike Williams^{†} (Note: Mike Williams: NL All-Star (2002, 2003))	1998	P	Yes
Carl Willis	1987	P	Yes
Brandon Wilson	1994–1995	SS	No
Bryse Wilson	2026	P	Yes
Craig A. Wilson	2000–2001	C	Yes
Craig F. Wilson	1996–1997	SS	Yes
Dan Wilson^{†} (Note: Dan Wilson: AL All-Star (1996))	1992	C	Yes
Enrique Wilson	2000	2B/SS	Yes
Gary Wilson	1998	P	Yes
Jack Wilson^{†} (Note: Jack Wilson: NL Silver Slugger (2004), NL All-Star (2004))	2001	SS	Yes
Justin Wilson	2023	P	Yes
Kenny Wilson	2017	LF/CF	No
Steve Wilson	1995	P	Yes
Weston Wilson	2021–2022	3B	Yes
Larry Wimberly	2001	P	No
Chris Wimmer	1998	3B/SS	No
Joe Winkelsas	2006	P	Yes
Jesse Winker	2023	1B/DH	Yes
Matt Winters	1982	OF	Yes
Patrick Wisdom	2019	3B	Yes
Tyler Woessner	2024	P	No
Jim Wohlford	1987	OF	Yes
Jerry Wolak	1994–1995	OF	No
Grant Wolfram	2025	P	Yes
Jason Wood	2000–2001	3B/SS	Yes
Jake Woodford	2026	P	Yes
Brandon Woodruff	2022–2023, 2025	P	Yes
Brian Woods	1997	P	No
Chris Woodward	2008	SS/2B	Yes
Dave Woodworth	1984	P	No
Rob Wooten	2012–2014	P	Yes
Bill Worden	1984	3B	No
Steve Worrell	1996	P	No
Chase Wright	2009–2011	P	Yes
Ron Wright	1998	1B	Yes
Rick Wrona	1992–1993, 1997	C	Yes
Eric Yardley	2021	P	Yes
Justin Yeager	2025	P	No
Christian Yelich^{†} (Note: Christian Yelich: NL All-Star (2024))	2021	LF	Yes
Andy Yerzy	2024	C	No
Craig Yoho	2024–2026	P	Yes
Chavez Young	2024	CF/RF	No
Jesus Zambrano	2015	P	No
Freddy Zamora	2024–2026	SS	No
Mark Zappelli	1996	P	No
Shawn Zarraga	2014	C	No
Rob Zastryzny	2024–2026	P	Yes
Bruce Zimmermann	2025	P	Yes
Barry Zito	2015	P	Yes
Ben Zobrist^{†} (Note: Ben Zobrist: World Series Most Valuable Player (2016), NL All-Star (2016))	2015	2B/LF/DH	Yes
Eddie Zosky	2000	SS/2B	Yes
Alec Zumwalt	2005–2007	P	No
Tony Zuniga	2005	3B/1B	No
Bob Zupcic	1994–1995	OF	Yes

== Notes ==
Table keys

MLB award winners and All-Stars
